= Rajasthan =

State in northwestern India

- State
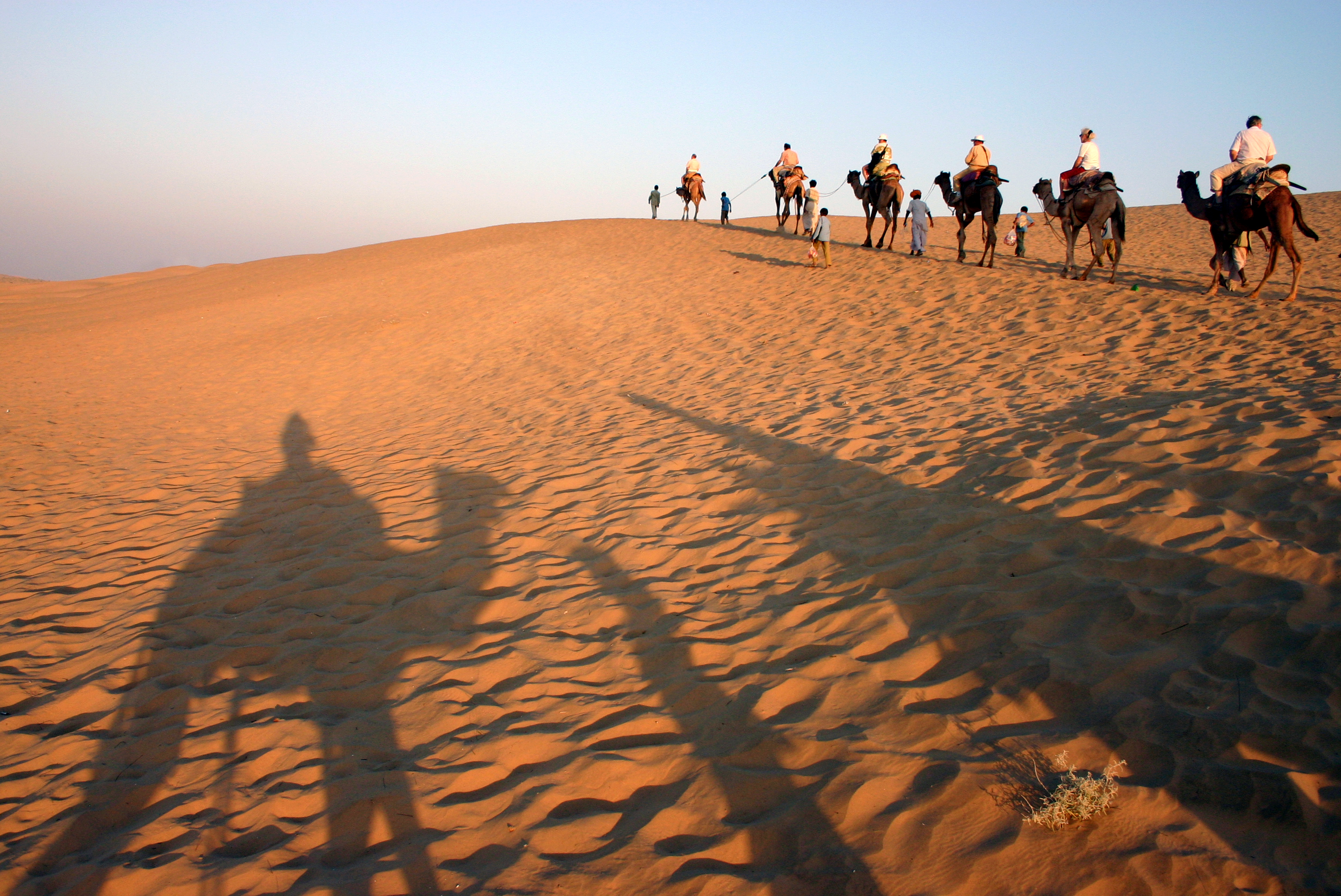
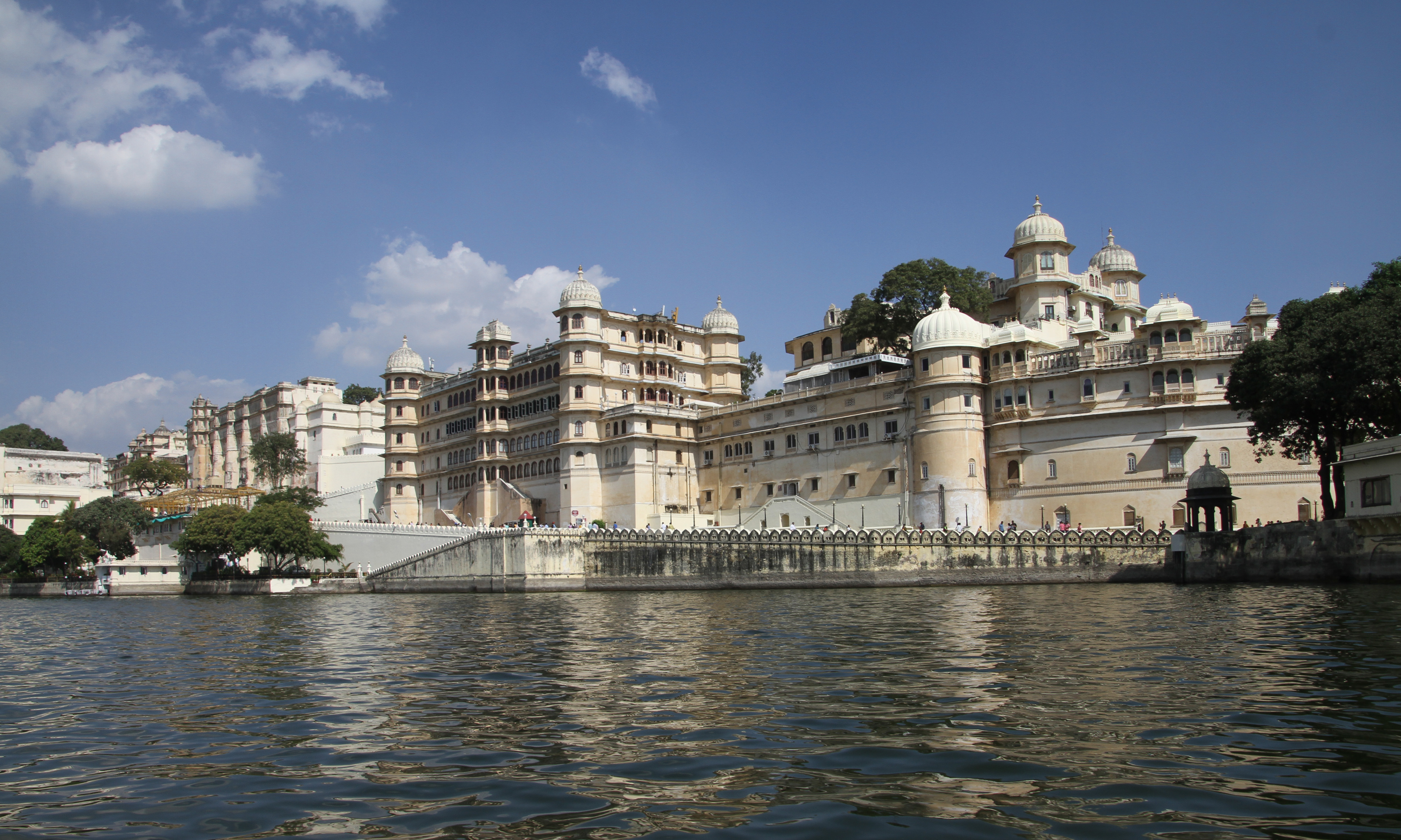
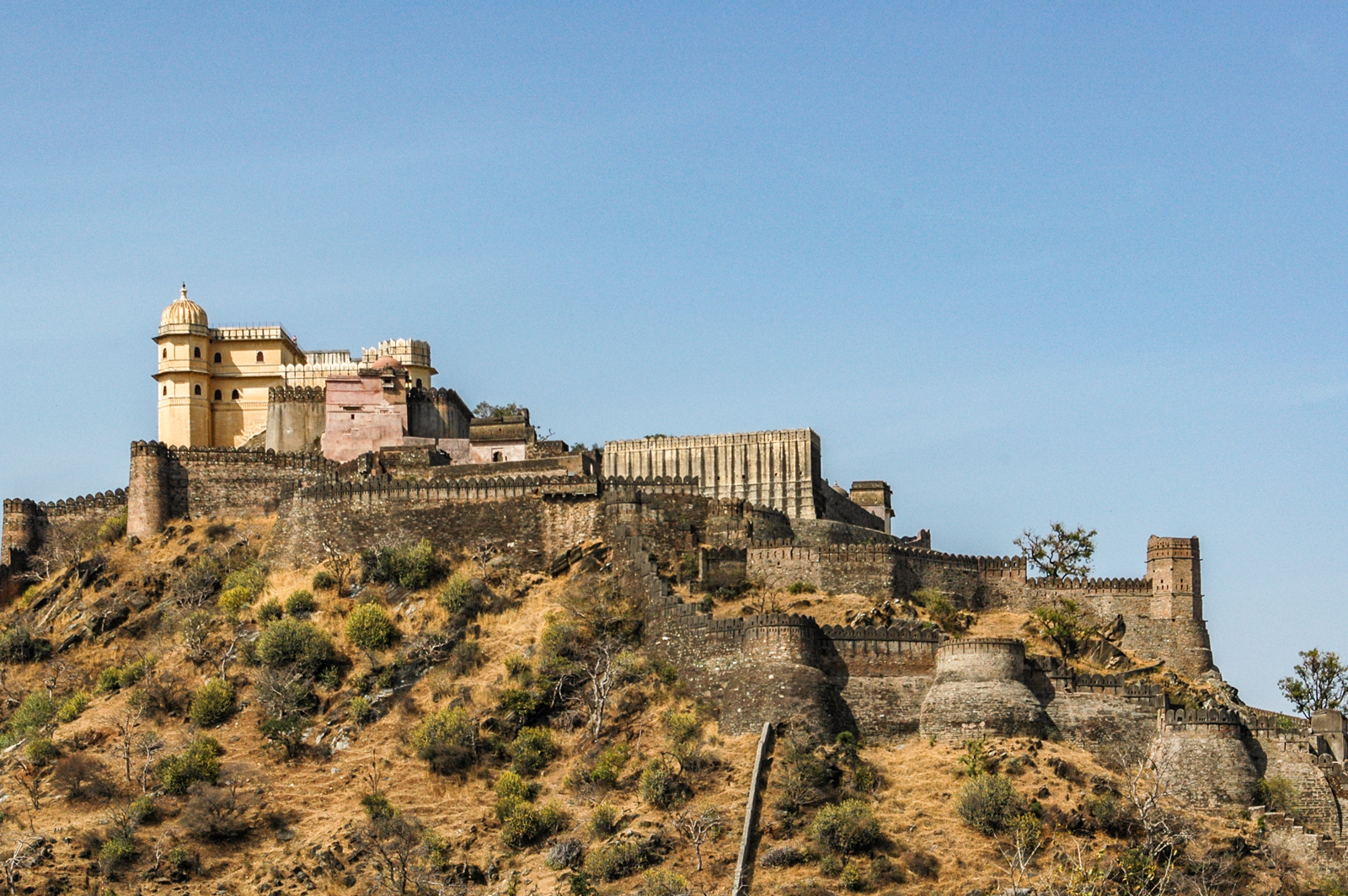
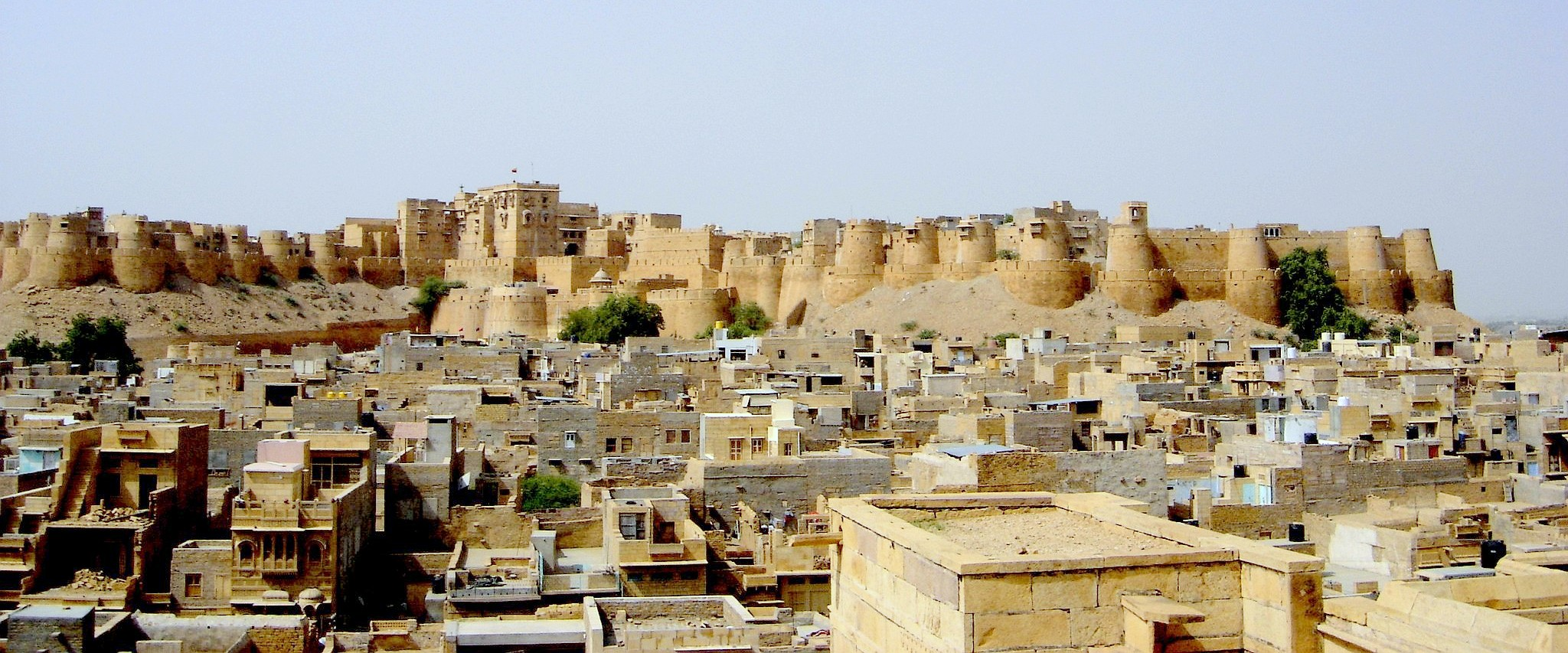
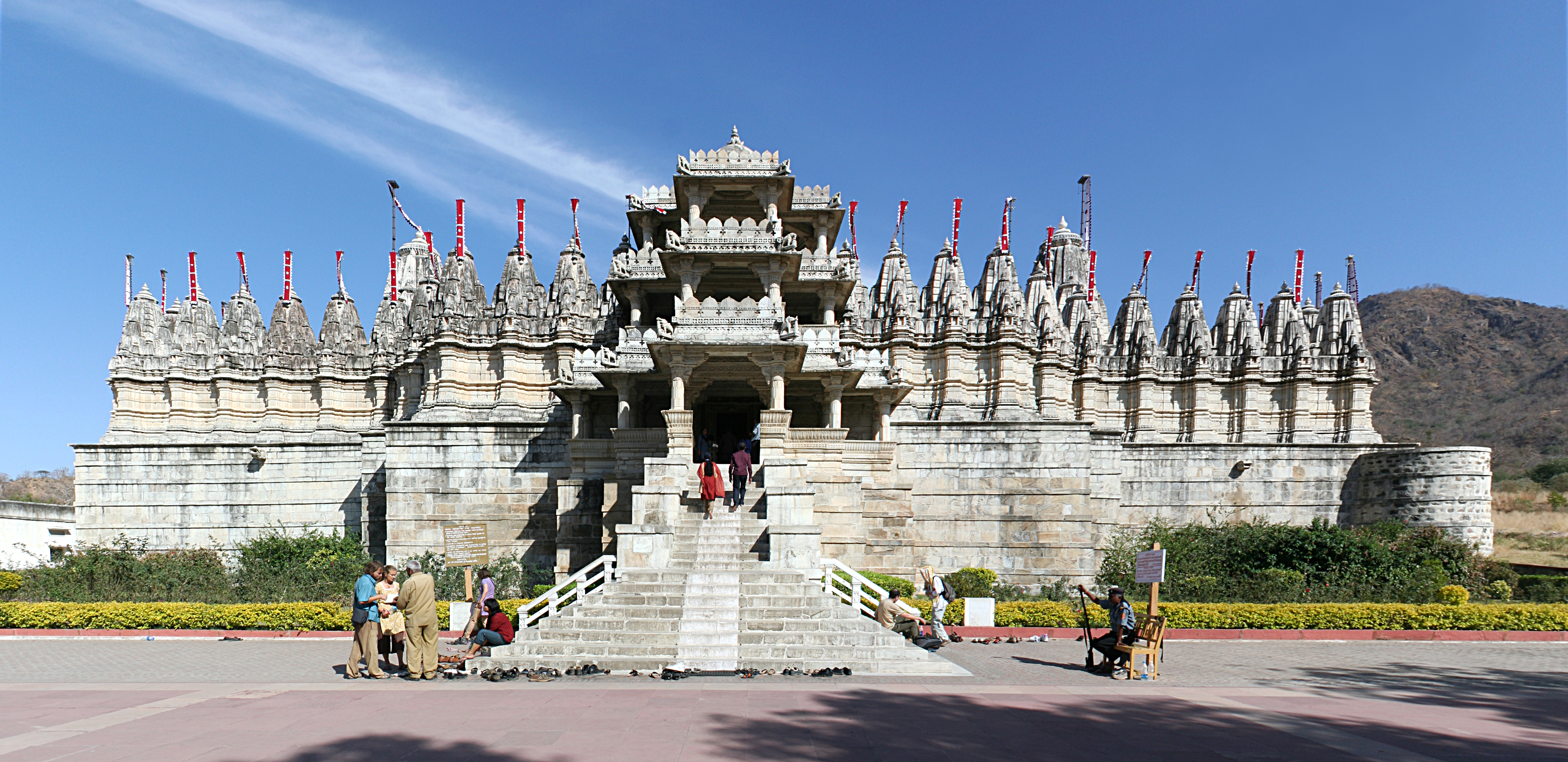
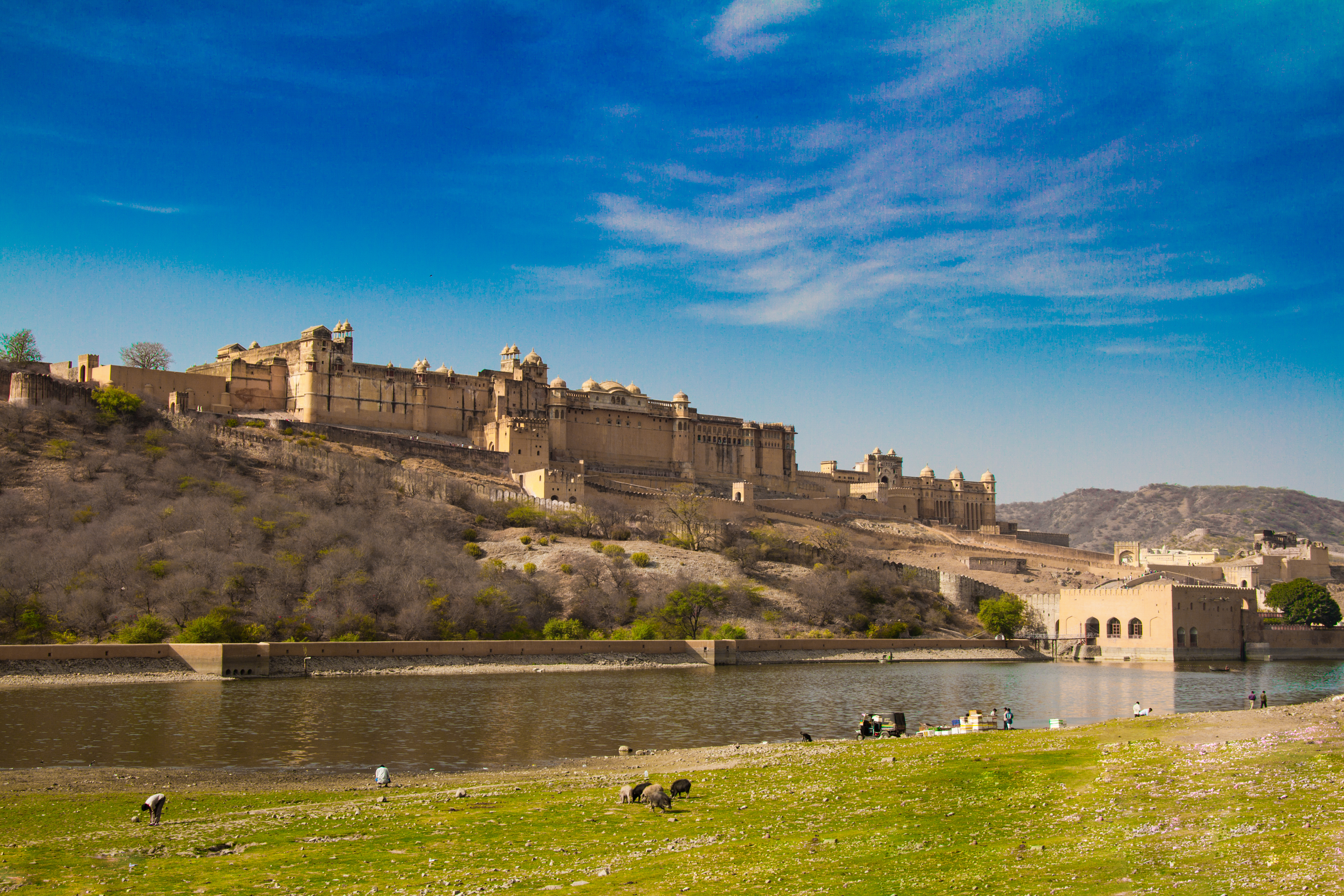
- Thar Desert City Palace, Udaipur Kumbhalgarh Jaisalmer Ranakpur Jain Temple Amer Fort

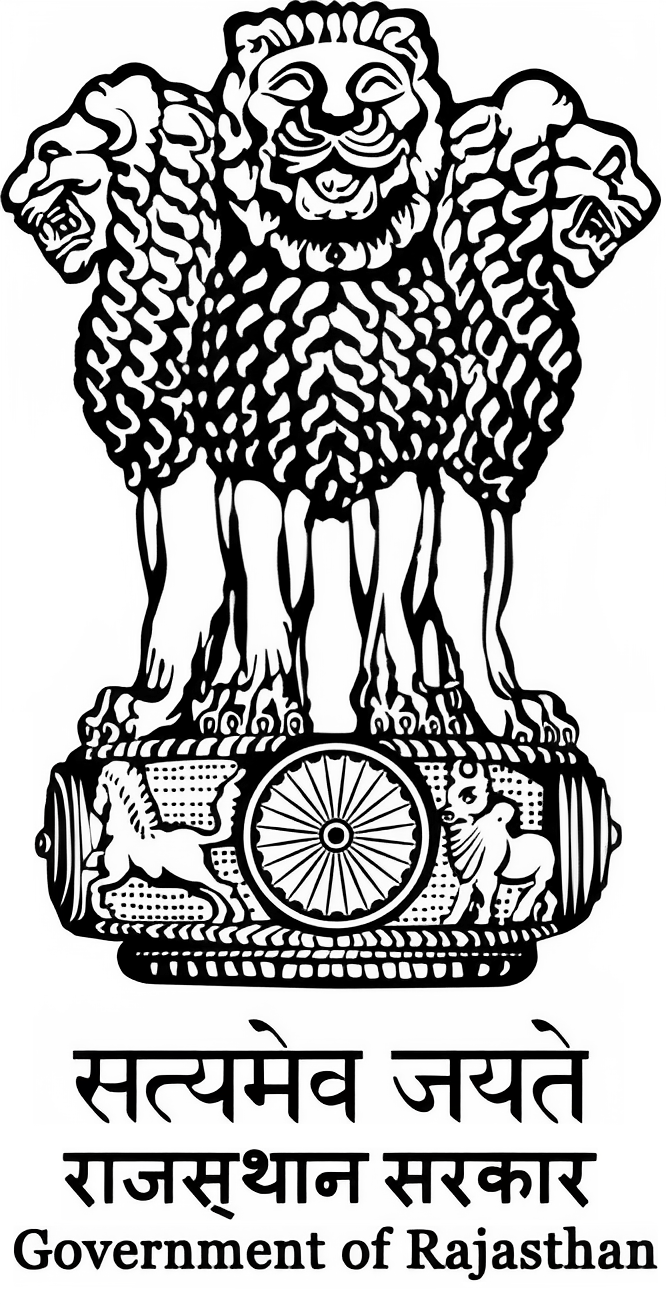
- Emblem of Rajasthan
- Etymology: Land of the Rajas (kings)
- Motto: Satyameva Jayate (Sanskrit) "Truth alone triumphs"
- Location of Rajasthan in India
- Coordinates: 26.6°N 73.8°E
- Country: India
- Region: Northwest India
- Previously was: Rajputana Agency
- Formation: 30 March 1949; 77 years ago
- Capital and largest city: Jaipur
- Districts: 41 (7 divisions)

Government
  - Body: Government of Rajasthan
  - Governor: Haribhau Kisanrao Bagde
  - Chief Minister: Bhajan Lal Sharma (BJP)
  - Deputy Chief Minister: Diya Kumari (BJP); Prem Chand Bairwa (BJP)

Area
  - Total: 342,239 km^{2} (132,139 sq mi)
  - Rank: 1st

Dimensions
  - Length: 826 km (513 mi)
  - Width: 869 km (540 mi)
- Elevation: 225 m (738 ft)
- Highest elevation (Guru Shikhar): 1,722 m (5,650 ft)
- Lowest elevation (Luni River): 100 m (330 ft)

Population (2011)
  - Total: ▲68,548,437
  - Rank: 7th
  - Density: 200/km^{2} (520/sq mi)
  - Urban: 24.87%
  - Rural: 75.13%
- Demonym: Rajasthani

Language
  - Official: Hindi
  - Additional official: English
  - Official script: Devanagari script

GDP
  - Total (2026–27): ▲₹21.52 lakh crore (US$230 billion) ▲$1.06 trillion (PPP)
  - Rank: 6th
  - Per capita: ▲₹225,200 (equivalent to ₹230,000 or US$2,500 in 2026) (22nd)
- Time zone: UTC+05:30 (IST)
- ISO 3166 code: IN-RJ
- Vehicle registration: RJ
- HDI (2022): ▲0.692 Medium (23rd)
- Literacy (2024): 75.8% (33rd)
- Sex ratio (2021): 1009♀/1000 ♂ (30th)
- Website: rajasthan.gov.in
- Symbols of Rajasthan
- Bird: Godawan
- Flower: Rohida
- Mammal: Camel and Chinkara
- Tree: Khejri
- State highway mark
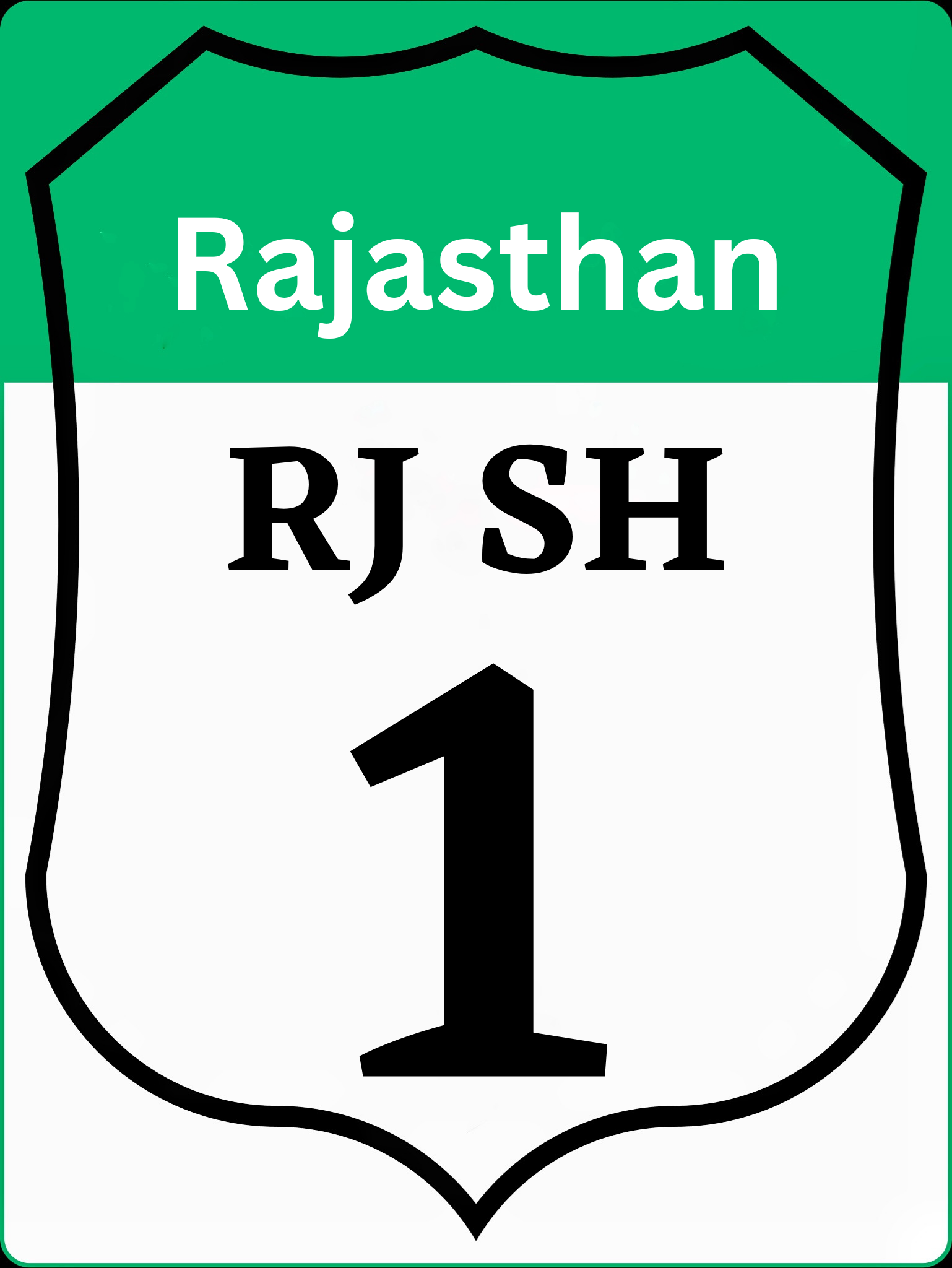
- State highway of Rajasthan; RJ SH1 -RJ SH138
- List of Indian state symbols

Rajasthan (Hindi: Rājasthāna, pronounced [ɾaːd͡ʒəsˈtʰaːn]; lit. 'Land of Kings') is a state in northwestern India. It is the largest Indian state by area and the seventh largest by population. It covers 342,239 square kilometres (132,139 mi^{2}) or 10.4 per cent of India's total geographical area. It is on India's northwestern side, where it comprises most of the wide and inhospitable Thar Desert (also known as the Great Indian Desert) and shares a border with the Pakistani provinces of Punjab to the northwest and Sindh to the west, along the Sutlej-Indus River valley. It is bordered by five other Indian states: Punjab to the north; Haryana and Uttar Pradesh to the northeast; Madhya Pradesh to the southeast; and Gujarat to the southwest. Its geographical location is 23°3' to 30°12' North latitude and 69°30' to 78°17' East longitude, with the Tropic of Cancer passing through its southernmost tip.

Its major features include the ruins of the Indus Valley Civilisation at Kalibangan and Balathal, the Dilwara Temples, a Jain pilgrimage site at Rajasthan's only hill station, Mount Abu, in the ancient Aravalli mountain range and eastern Rajasthan, the Keoladeo National Park of Bharatpur, a World Heritage Site known for its bird life. Rajasthan is also home to five national tiger reserves, the Ranthambore National Park in Sawai Madhopur, Sariska Tiger Reserve in Alwar, the Mukundra Hills Tiger Reserve in Kota, Ramgarh Vishdhari Tiger reserve and Karauli Dholpur tiger reserve.

The State of Rajasthan was formed on 30 March 1949 when the states of the Rajputana Agency of the erstwhile British Empire in India were merged into the new Indian Union. Its capital and largest city is Jaipur. Other important cities are Jodhpur, Kota, Bikaner, Ajmer, Bhilwara, Sawai Madhopur, Bharatpur and Udaipur. The economy of Rajasthan is the seventh-largest state economy in India with ₹10.20 lakh crore (US$110 billion) in gross domestic product and a per capita GDP of ₹118,000 (US$1,300). Rajasthan ranks 22nd among Indian states in human development index.

== Etymology ==
Rajasthan means "Land of Kings" and is a portmanteau of Sanskrit "Rājā" ('King') and Sanskrit "Sthāna" ('Land') or Persian "Stān", with the same meaning. The first printed mention of the name Rajasthan appears in the 1829 publication Annals and Antiquities of Rajasthan or the Central and Western Rajpoot States of India, while the earliest known record of Rajputana as a name for the region is in George Thomas's 1800 memoir Military Memories. John Keay, in his book India: A History, stated that Rajputana was coined by the British in 1829, John Briggs, translating Ferishta's history of early Islamic India, used the phrase "Rajpoot (Rajput) princes" rather than "Indian princes".

== History ==
=== Ancient times ===
Parts of what is now Rajasthan were partly part of the Indus Valley Civilisation and the Vedic Civilisation. Kalibangan, in Hanumangarh district, was a major provincial capital of the Indus Valley Civilisation. Topsfield writes that the Rajputs first entered India from the north-west in the first millennium A.D. They established kingdoms in western India in the region that is now known as Rajasthan.

An archaeological excavation at the Balathal site in Udaipur district shows a settlement contemporary with the Harrapan civilisation dating back to 3000–1500 BCE. Stone Age tools dating from 5,000 to 200,000 years were found in Bundi and Bhilwara districts of the state.

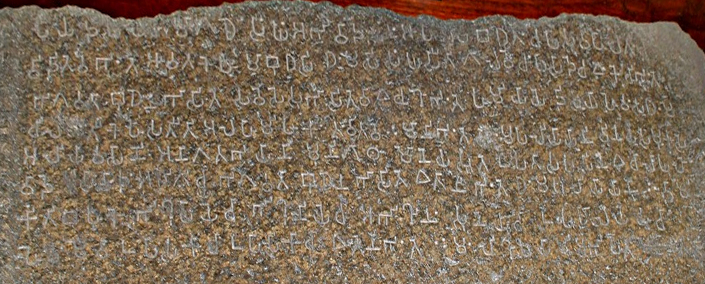
The Minor Rock Edict 3 of Ashoka, found on the platform in front of the Bairat Temple of Viratnagar, Rajasthan.

The Matsya kingdom of the Vedic civilisation of India is said to roughly correspond to the former state of Jaipur in Rajasthan and included the whole of Alwar with portions of Bharatpur. The capital of Matsya was at Viratanagar (modern Bairat), which is said to have been named after its founder King Virata.

Bhargava identifies the two districts of Jhunjhunu and Sikar and parts of Jaipur district along with Haryana districts of Mahendragarh and Rewari as part of Vedic state of Brahmavarta. Bhargava also locates the present day Sahibi River as the Vedic Drishadwati River, which along with Saraswati River formed the borders of the Vedic state of Brahmavarta. Manu and Bhrigu narrated the Manusmriti to a congregation of seers in this area. The ashrams of Vedic seers Bhrigu and his son Chayvan Rishi, for whom Chyawanprash was formulated, were near Dhosi Hill, part of which lies in Dhosi village of Jhunjhunu district of Rajasthan and part of which lies in Mahendragarh district of Haryana.

The Western Kshatrapas (405–35 BCE), the Saka rulers of the western part of India, were successors to the Indo-Scythians and were contemporaneous with the Kushans, who ruled the northern part of the Indian subcontinent. The Indo-Scythians invaded the area of Ujjain and established the Saka era (with their calendar), marking the beginning of the long-lived Saka Western Satraps state.

The Allahabad Pillar Inscription (also known as the Prayaga Pillar Inscription) of Samudragupta, AD 360, records that the Abhiras were a powerful tribe who ruled over the whole of Rajasthan.

=== Classical era ===
==== Gurjara-Pratihara ====
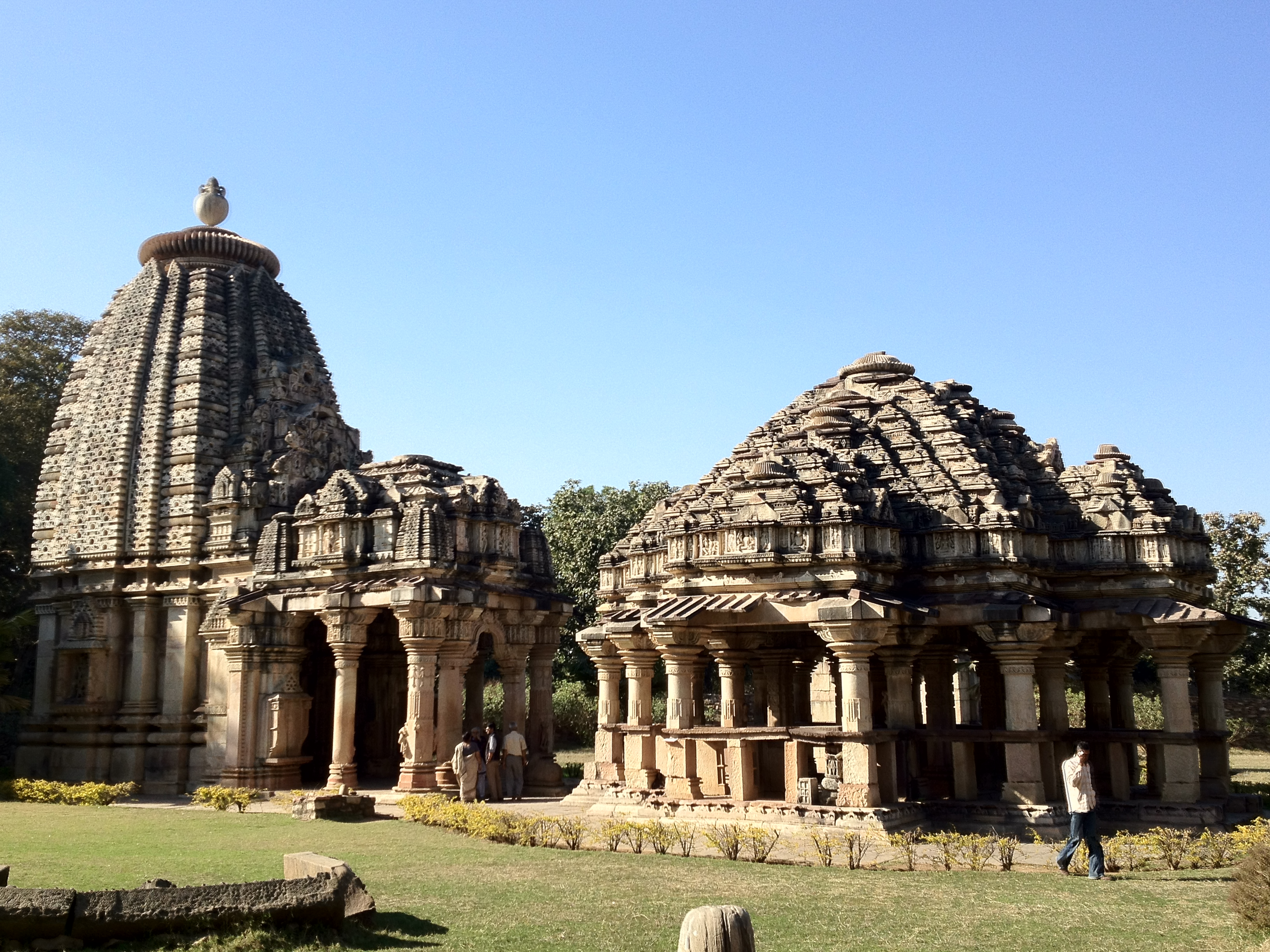
Ghateshwara Mahadeva temple at the Baroli Temple Complex. The temples were built between the 10th and 11th centuries by the Gurjara-Pratihara dynasty.

The Pratiharas ruled for many dynasties in this part of the country; the region was known as Gurjaratra. Up to the 10th century, almost all of North India acknowledged the supremacy of the Imperial Pratiharas, with their seat of power at Kannauj.

The Gurjara Pratihar Empire acted as a barrier for Arab invaders from the 8th to the 11th century. The chief accomplishment of the Gurjara-Pratihara Empire lies in its successful resistance to foreign invasions from the west, starting in the days of Junaid. Historian R. C. Majumdar says that this was openly acknowledged by the Arab writers. He further notes that historians of India have wondered at the slow progress of Muslim invaders in India, as compared with their rapid advance in other parts of the world. Now there seems little doubt that it was the power of the Pratihara army that effectively barred the progress of the Arabs beyond the confines of Sindh, their only conquest for nearly 300 years.

=== Medieval and early modern eras ===
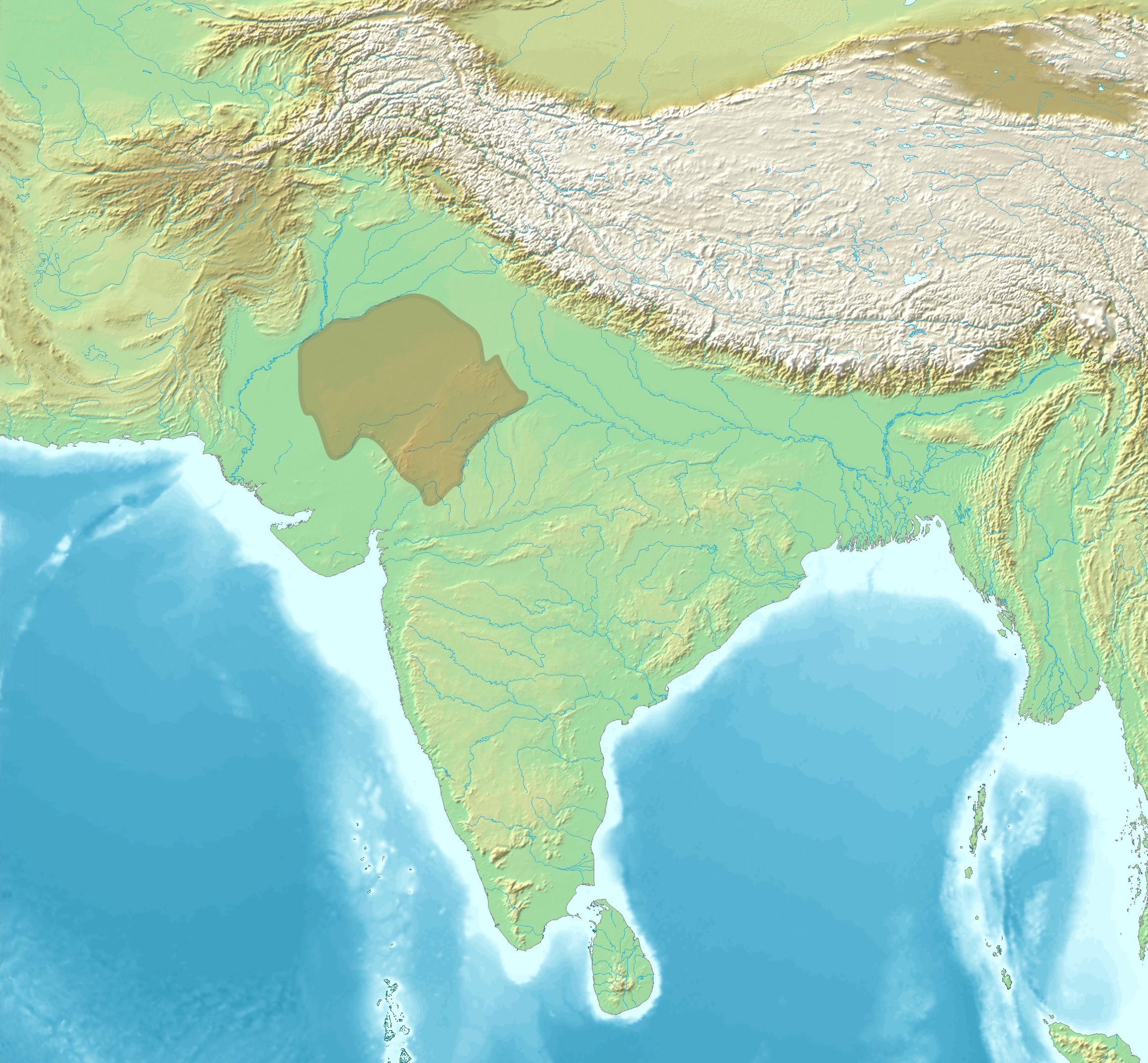
Rajputana territory (brown), and main South Asian polities c. 1525, on the eve of the establishment of the Mughal Empire.

The Ghurids had made an attempt to invade India through southern Rajasthan, however they were defeated in the Battle of Kasahrada on 1178 by a confederacy of Rajputs under Mularaja II of the Kingdom of Gujarat. Prithviraj Chauhan led a confederacy of Rajput clans and defeated the invading Ghruids under Muhammad Ghori in the First Battle of Tarain in 1191. In 1192, Muhammad Ghori decisively defeated Prithviraj at the Second Battle of Tarain. After the defeat of Chauhan in the same year, a part of Rajasthan came under Muslim rulers. The principal centres of their powers were Nagaur and Ajmer. Ranthambhore was also under their suzerainty. At the beginning of the 13th century, the most prominent and powerful state of Rajasthan was Mewar. Since the invasion of the Muslim Turks from the 13th century onwards, the Rajputs resisted the Muslim incursions into India, and preserved Hindu culture at their courts.

The Rajputs put up resistance to the Islamic invasions with their warfare and chivalry for centuries. The Ranas of Mewar led other kingdoms in their resistance to outside rule. Rana Hammir Singh defeated the Tughlaq dynasty and recovered a large portion of Rajasthan. The indomitable Rana Kumbha defeated the Sultans of Malwa, Nagaur and Gujarat and made Mewar the most powerful Rajput Kingdom in India. The ambitious Rana Sanga united the various Rajput clans, including the Muslim Khanzadas of Mewat under Raja Hasan Khan Mewati, and fought against the foreign powers in India. Rana Sanga defeated the Afghan Lodi Empire of Delhi and crushed the Turkic Sultanates of Malwa and Gujarat. Rana Sanga then tried to create an Indian empire but was defeated by the first Mughal Emperor Babur at Khanwa. The defeat was due to betrayal by the Tomar King Silhadi of Raisen. After Rana Sanga's death, Marwar rose as a power centre in Rajasthan under Rao Maldeo Rathore. He conquered Jaisalmer, parts of Gujarat, Jalore, Nagaur, Ajmer, Sanchore, Bhinmal, Radhanpur, Bayana, Tonk, Toda and Nabhara. He expanded the territories of Marwar up to Sindh-Cholistan in west and his northern boundary was just fifty kilometres from Delhi. After defeating Humayun, Sher Shah came towards Rajputana. He defeated Chiefs of Rathore army by trickery in Battle of Sammel and captured some territory of Marwar but it was recovered by Rathores in 1545.

Hem Chandra Vikramaditya, the Hindu emperor, was born in the village of Machheri in Alwar District in 1501. He won 22 battles against Afghans, from Punjab to Bengal including the states of Ajmer and Alwar in Rajasthan, and defeated Akbar's forces twice, first at Agra and then at Delhi in 1556 at Battle of Delhi before acceding to the throne of Delhi and establishing the "Hindu Raj" in North India, albeit for a short duration, from Purana Qila in Delhi. Hem Chandra was killed in the battlefield at Second Battle of Panipat fighting against Mughals on 5 November 1556.

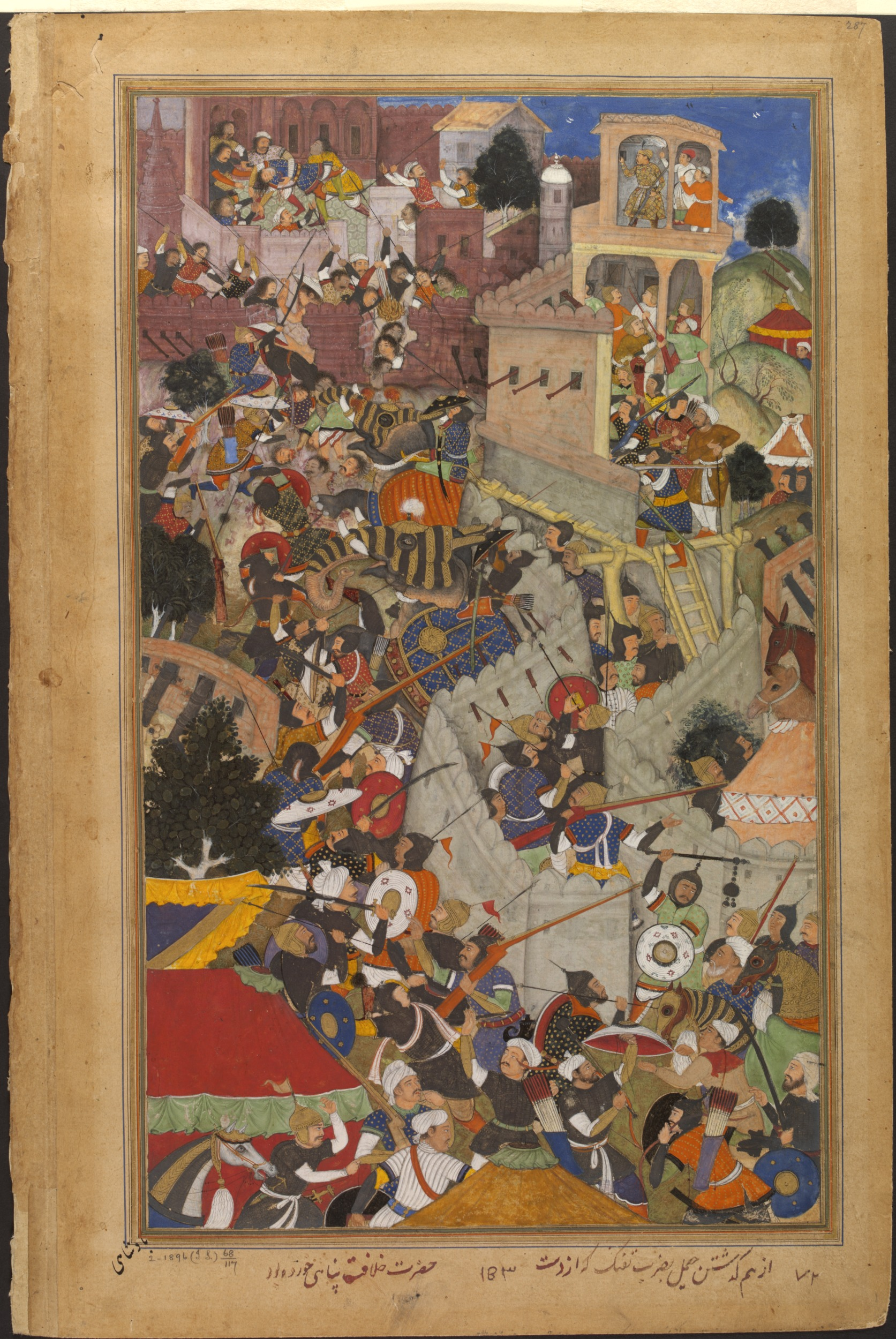
Akbar shoots the Rajput commander Jaimal using a matchlock, during the Siege of Chittor (1567–1568).

During Akbar's reign most of the Rajput kings accepted Mughal suzerainty, but the rulers of Mewar (Rana Udai Singh II) and Marwar (Rao Chandrasen Rathore) refused to have any form of alliance with the Mughals. To teach the Rajputs a lesson Akbar attacked Udai Singh and killed Rajput commander Jaimal of Chitor and the citizens of Mewar in large numbers. Akbar killed 20,000–25,000 unarmed citizens in Chittor on the grounds that they had actively helped in the resistance.

Maharana Pratap took an oath to avenge the citizens of Chittor; he fought the Mughal empire till his death and liberated most of Mewar apart from Chittor itself. Maharana Pratap soon became the most celebrated warrior of Rajasthan and became famous all over India for his sporadic warfare and noble actions. According to Satish Chandra, "Rana Pratap's defiance of the mighty Mughal empire, almost alone and unaided by the other Rajput states, constitutes a glorious saga of Rajput valor and the spirit of self-sacrifice for cherished principles. Rana Pratap's methods of sporadic warfare were later elaborated further by Malik Ambar, the Deccani general, and by Shivaji".

Rana Amar Singh I continued his ancestor's war against the Mughals under Jehangir, he repelled the Mughal armies at Dewar. Later an expedition was again sent under the leadership of Prince Khurram, which caused much damage to life and property of Mewar. Many temples were destroyed, several villages were put on fire and women and children were captured and tortured to make Amar Singh accept surrender.

During Aurangzeb's rule Rana Raj Singh I, Veer Durgadas Rathore and Patshah Akheraj Singh Rajpurohit were chief among those who defied the intolerant emperor of Delhi. They took advantage of the Aravalli hills and caused heavy damage to the Mughal armies that were trying to occupy Rajasthan.

After Aurangzeb's death Bahadur Shah I tried to subjugate Rajasthan like his ancestors but his plan backfired when the three Rajput Rajas of Amber, Udaipur, and Jodhpur made a joint resistance to the Mughals. The Rajputs first expelled the commandants of Jodhpur and Bayana and recovered Amer by a night attack. They next killed Sayyid Hussain Khan Barha, the commandant of Mewat and many other Mughal officers. Bahadur Shah I, then in the Deccan was forced to patch up a truce with the Rajput Rajas. The Jats, under Suraj Mal, overran the Mughal garrison at Agra and plundered the city taking with them the two great silver doors of the entrance of the famous Taj Mahal which were then melted down by Suraj Mal in 1763.

Over the years, the Mughals began to have internal disputes which greatly distracted them at times. The Mughal Empire continued to weaken, and with the decline of the Mughal Empire in the late 18th century, Rajputana came under the influence of the Marathas. The Maratha Empire, which had replaced the Mughal Empire as the overlord of the subcontinent, was finally replaced by the British Empire in 1818.

In the 19th century, the Rajput kingdoms were exhausted financially and in manpower after continuous wars and due to heavy tributes exacted by the Maratha Empire. To save their kingdoms from instability, rebellions and banditry the Rajput kings concluded treaties with the British in the early 19th century, accepting British suzerainty and control over their external affairs in return for internal autonomy.

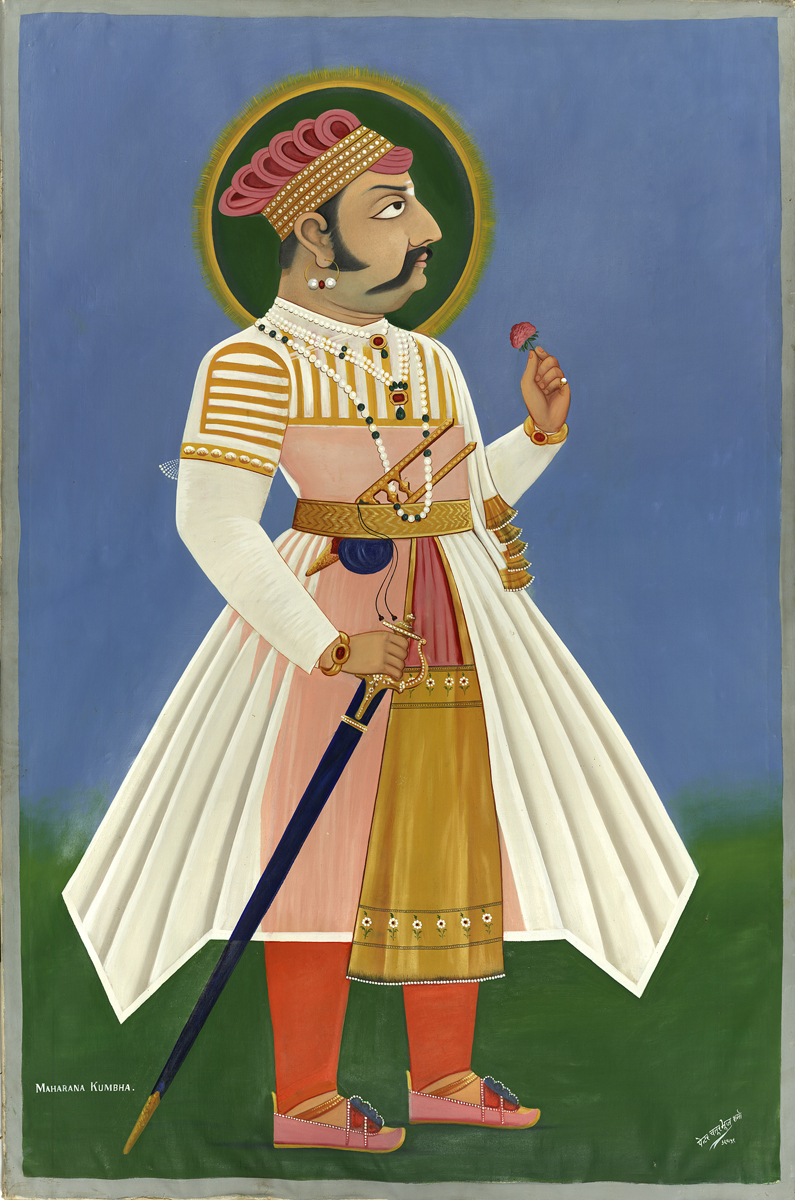
Rana Kumbha was the vanguard of the fifteenth century Rajput resurgence.

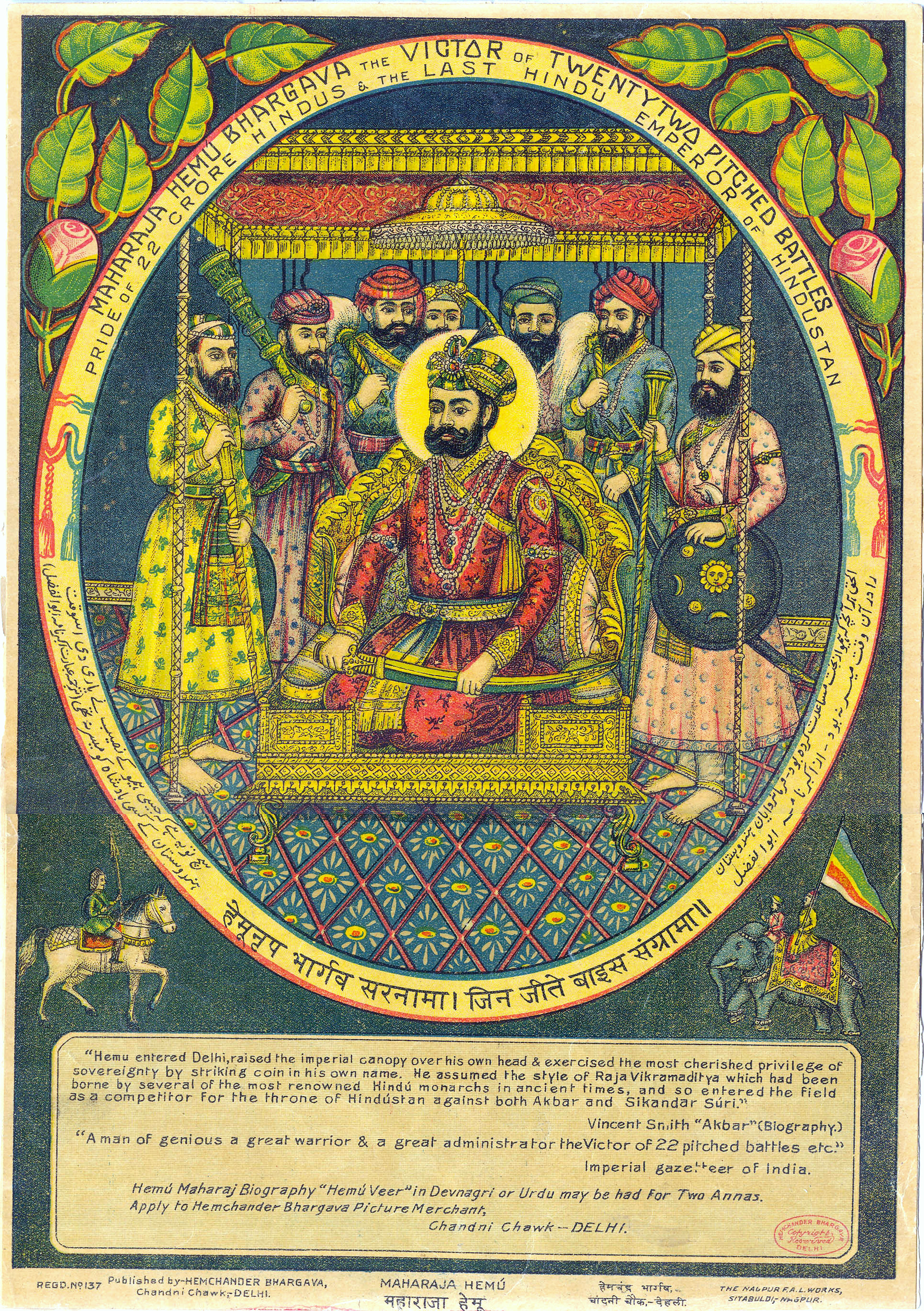
The emperor Hemu, who rose from obscurity and briefly established himself as ruler in northern India, from Punjab to Bengal, in defiance of the warring Sur and Mughal Empires.

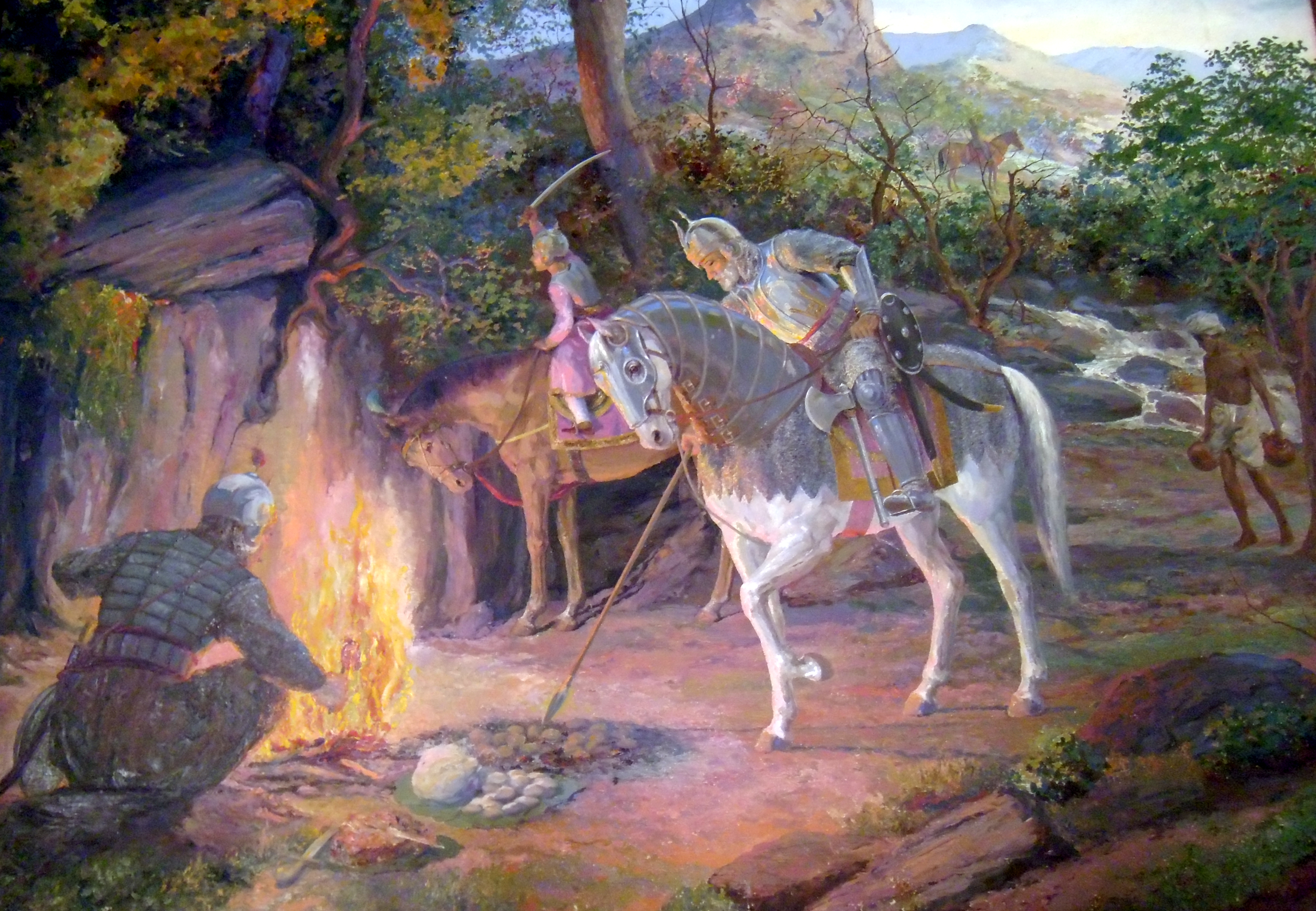
Durgadas Rathore, a Rathore Rajput warrior of Jodhpur who played an important role in protecting the Rathore dynasty of Marwar and for his rebellion against Aurangzeb.

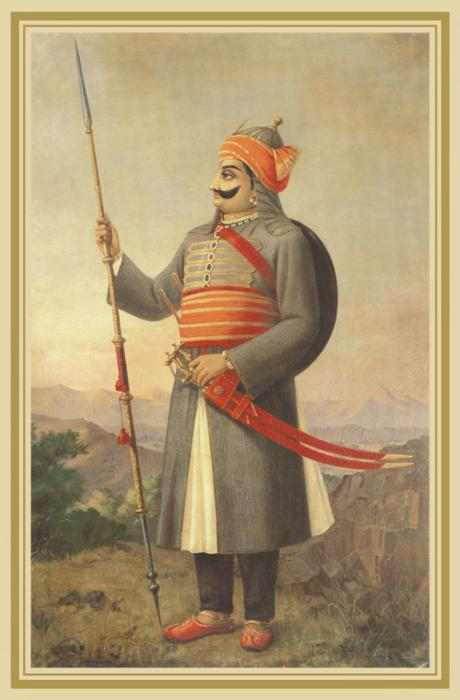
Maharana Pratap Singh, sixteenth-century Rajput ruler of Mewar, known for his defence of his realm against Mughal invasion.

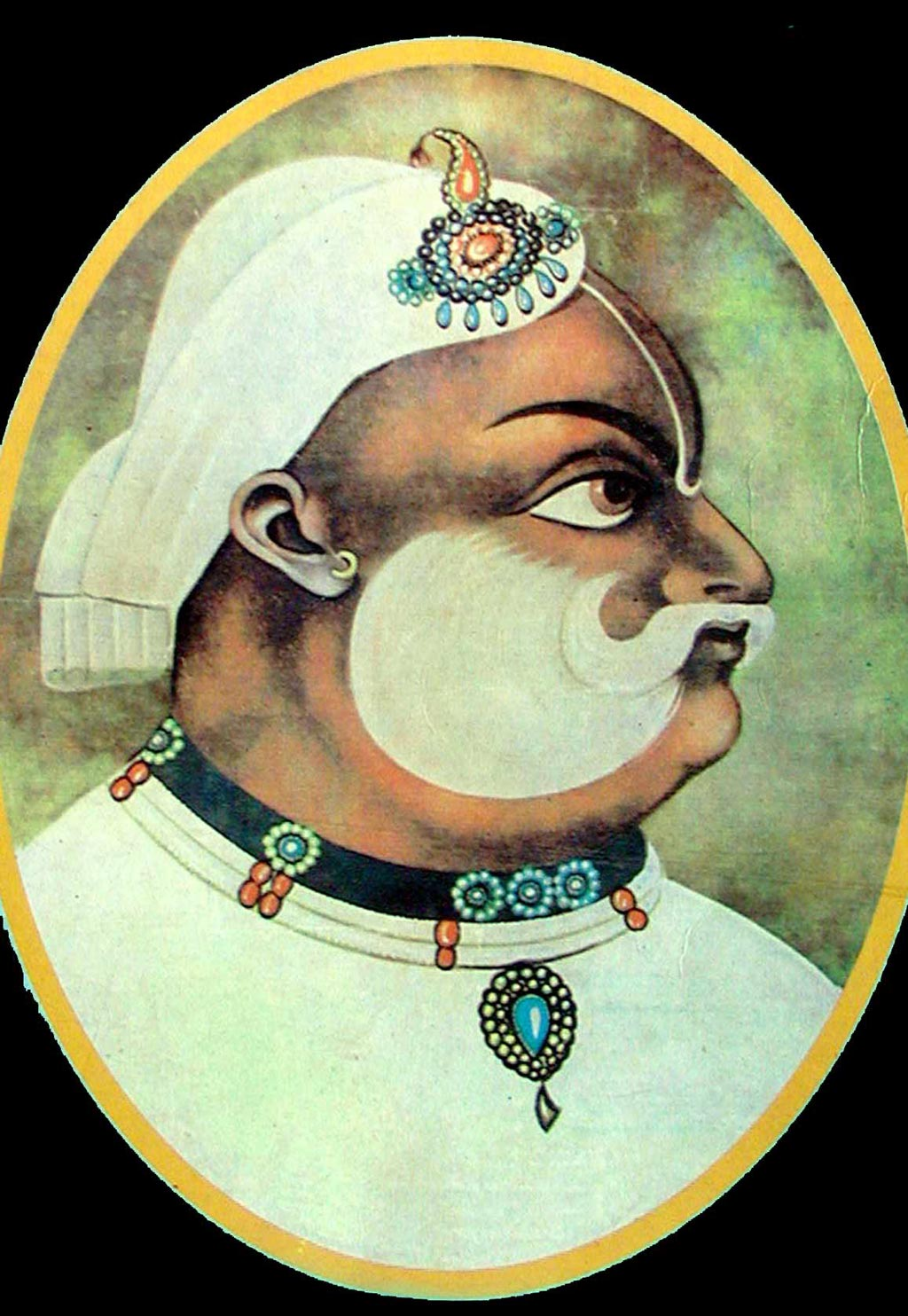
Suraj Mal was ruler of Bharatpur. Some contemporary historians described him as "the Plato of the Jat people" and by a modern writer as the "Jat Odysseus", because of his political sagacity, steady intellect and clear vision.

=== Modern era ===
The State of Rajasthan was formed on 30 March 1949 when the states of the Rajputana Agency of the erstwhile British Empire in India were merged into the new Indian Union. Modern Rajasthan includes most of Rajputana, which comprises the erstwhile nineteen princely states, three chiefships, and the British district of Ajmer-Merwara. Jaisalmer, Marwar (Jodhpur), Bikaner, Mewar (Chittorgarh), Alwar and Dhundhar (Jaipur) were some of the main Rajput princely states. Bharatpur and Dholpur were Jat princely states whereas Tonk was a princely state under Pathans. The three chiefships were Lawa, Neemrana and Kushalgarh.

== Geography ==
The geographic features of Rajasthan are the Thar Desert and the Aravalli Range, which runs through the state from southwest to northeast, almost from one end to the other, for more than 850 kilometres (530 mi). Mount Abu lies at the southwestern end of the range, separated from the main ranges by the West Banas River. Although a series of broken ridges continues into Haryana in the direction of Delhi where it can be seen as outcrops in the form of the Raisina Hill and the ridges farther north. About three-fifths of Rajasthan lies northwest of the Aravallis, leaving two-fifths on the east and south direction.

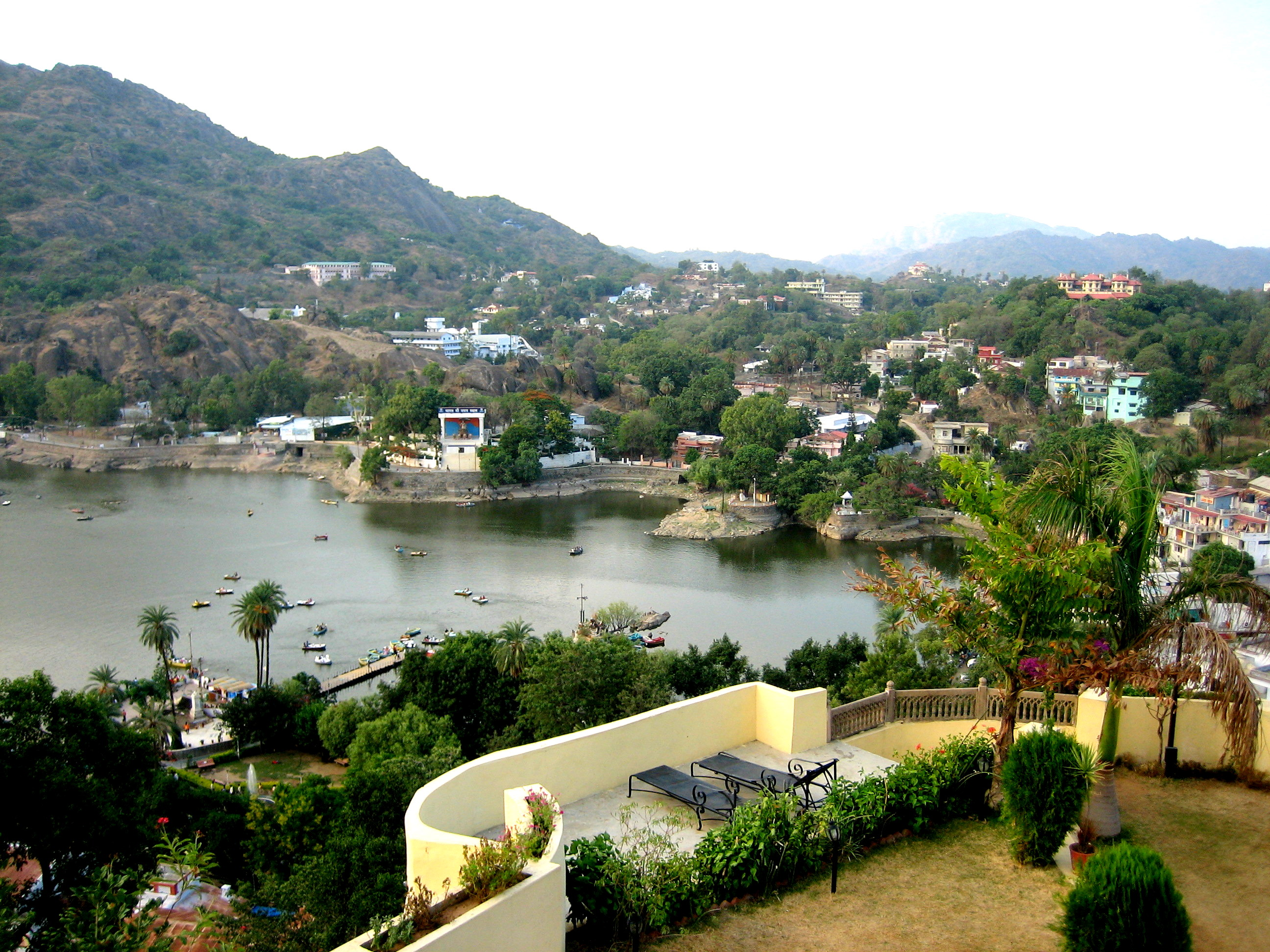
Mount Abu.

The Aravalli Range runs across the state from the southwest peak Guru Shikhar (Mount Abu), which is 1,722 metres (5,650 ft) in height, to Khetri in the northeast. This range divides the state into 60% in the northwest of the range and 40% in the southeast. The northwest tract is sandy and unproductive with little water but improves gradually from desert land in the far west and northwest to comparatively fertile and habitable land towards the east. The south-eastern area, higher in elevation (100 to 350 m above sea level) and more fertile, has a very diversified topography. In the south lies the hilly tract of Mewar. In the southeast, a large area within the districts of Kota and Bundi forms a tableland. To the northeast of these districts is a rugged region (badlands) following the line of the Chambal River. Farther north the country levels out; the flat plains of the northeastern Bharatpur district are part of an alluvial basin. Merta City lies in the geographical centre of Rajasthan.

The Aravalli Range and the lands to the east and southeast of the range are generally more fertile and better watered. This region is home to the Khathiar-Gir dry deciduous forests ecoregion, with tropical dry broadleaf forests that include teak, Acacia, and other trees. The hilly Vagad region, home to the cities of Dungarpur, Pratapgarh, and Banswara lies in southernmost Rajasthan, on the border with Gujarat and Madhya Pradesh. With the exception of Mount Abu, Vagad is the wettest region in Rajasthan, and the most heavily forested. North of Vagad lies the Mewar region, home to the cities of Udaipur and Chittaurgarh. The Hadoti region lies to the southeast, on the border with Madhya Pradesh. North of Hadoti and Mewar lies the Dhundhar region, home to the state capital of Jaipur. Mewat, the easternmost region of Rajasthan, borders Haryana and Uttar Pradesh. Eastern and southeastern Rajasthan is drained by the Banas and Chambal rivers, tributaries of the Ganges.

The northwestern portion of Rajasthan is generally sandy and dry. Most of this region is covered by the Thar Desert, which extends into adjoining portions of Pakistan. The Aravalli Range does not intercept the moisture-giving southwest monsoon winds off the Arabian Sea, as it lies in a direction parallel to that of the coming monsoon winds, leaving the northwestern region in a rain shadow. The Thar Desert is thinly populated; the City of Jodhpur is the largest city in the desert and a major metropolitan area of India which is known as the gateway of the Thar Desert. The desert has some major districts like Jodhpur, Jaisalmer, Barmer, Bikaner, and Nagaur. This area is also important from a defence point of view. Jodhpur airbase is one of the largest airbases in India, BSF and Military bases are also situated here. Currently four civil airports are located here: Jodhpur, Jaisalmer, Bikaner and Nagaur, of which Jodhpur is the major civil airport, being the 44th busiest airport in India and one of the oldest air strips of India, being built in the 1920s.

The Northwestern thorn scrub forests lie in a band around the Thar Desert, between the desert and the Aravallis. This region receives less than 400 mm of rain annually. Temperatures can sometimes exceed 45 °C in the summer months and drop below freezing point in the winter. The Godwar, Marwar, and Shekhawati regions lie in the thorn scrub forest zone, along with the city of Jodhpur. The Luni River and its tributaries are the major river system of Godwar and Marwar regions, draining the western slopes of the Aravallis and emptying southwest into the great Rann of Kutch wetland in neighbouring Gujarat. This river is saline in the lower reaches and remains potable only up to Balotara in Barmer district. The Ghaggar River, which originates in Haryana, is an intermittent stream that disappears into the sands of the Thar Desert in the northern corner of the state and is seen as a remnant of the primitive Sarasvati river.

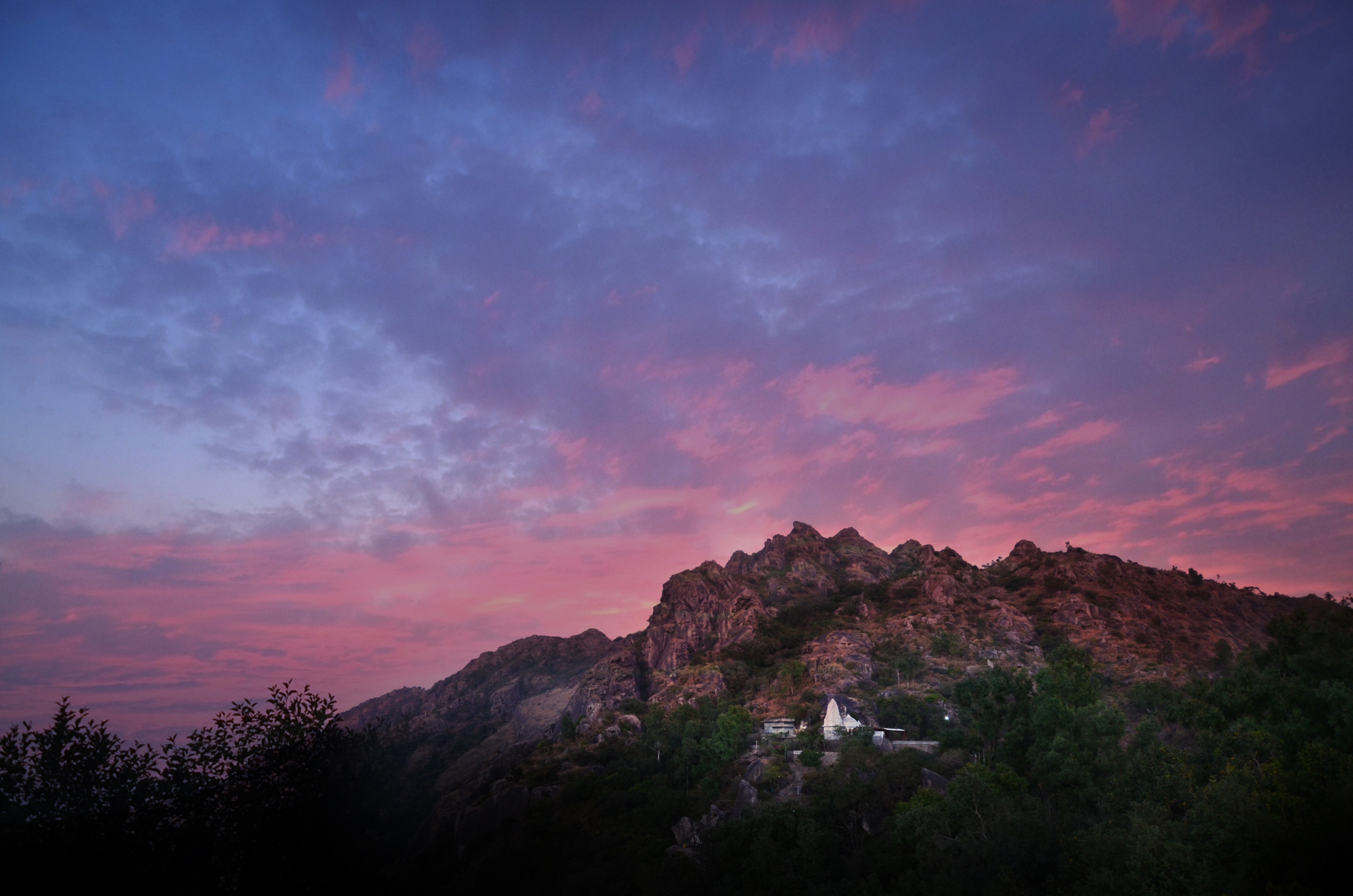
Mount Abu is a popular hill station in Rajasthan.

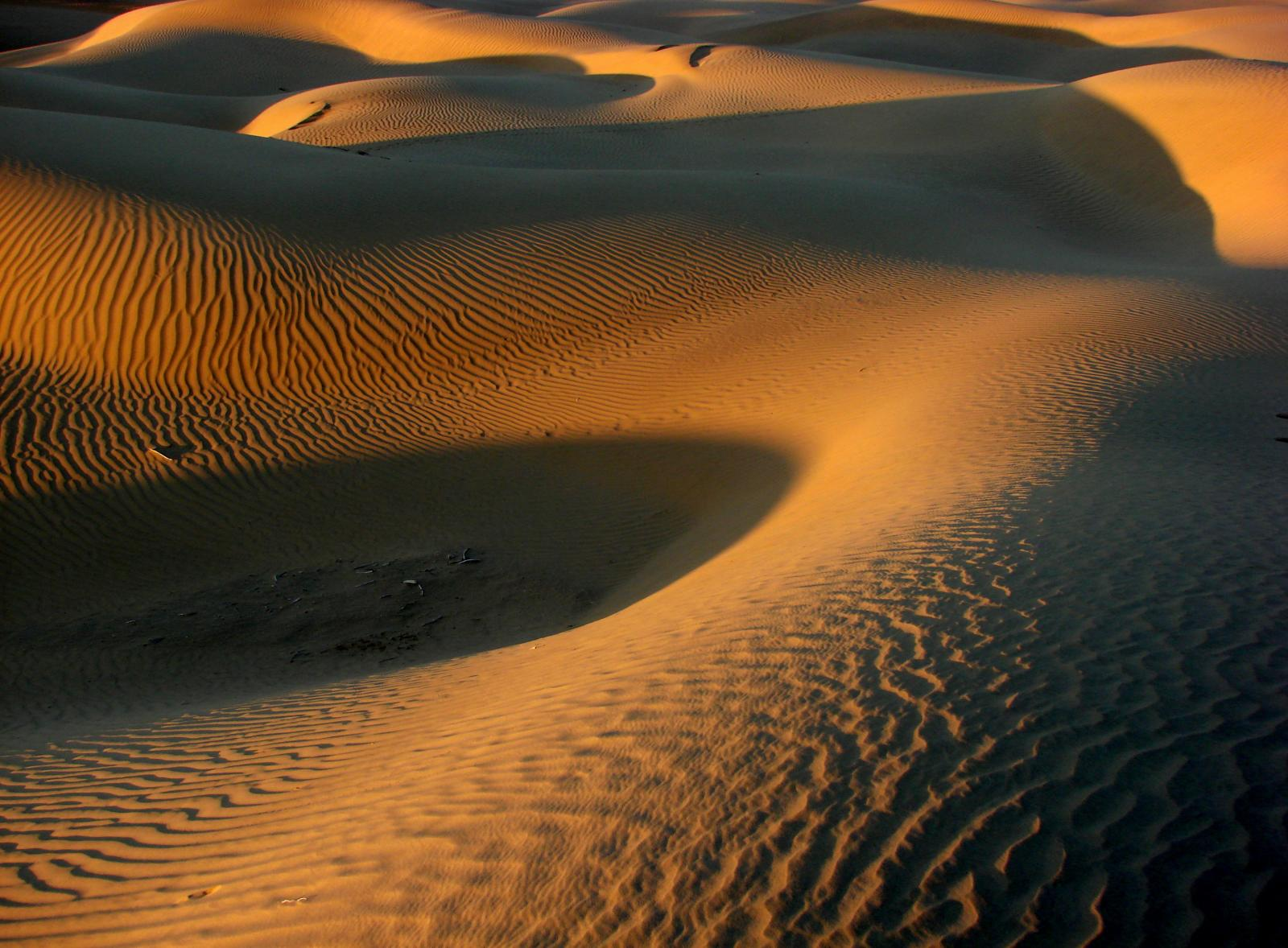
The Thar Desert near Jaisalmer.

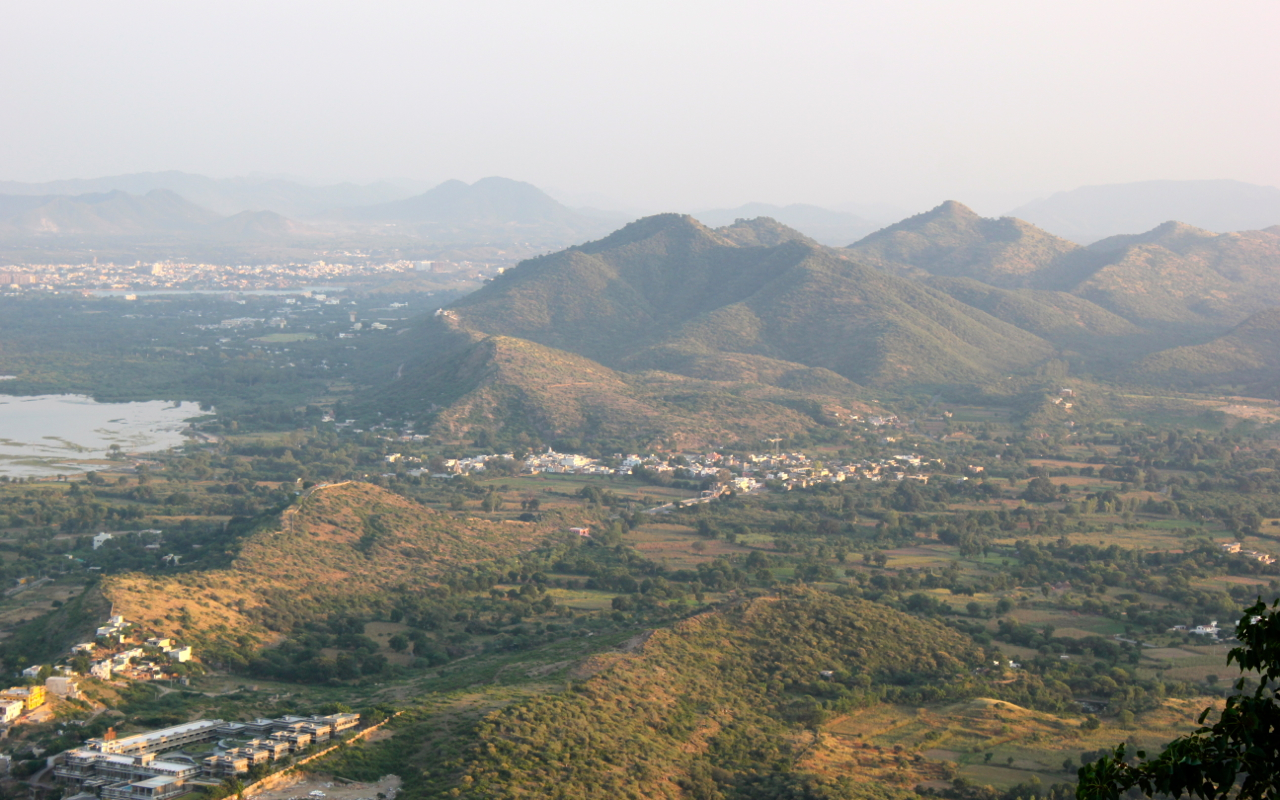
Aerial view Udaipur and Aravali hills.

== Flora and fauna ==
State symbols of Rajasthan
Formation day	1 November
State animal	Chinkara and camel
State bird	Godavan (great Indian bustard)
State flower	Rohida
State tree	Khejadi

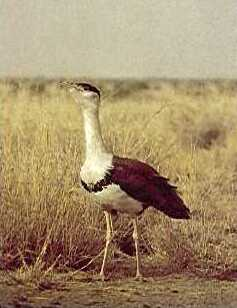
The great Indian bustard has been classed as critically endangered since 2011

The Desert National Park in Jaisalmer, spread over an area of 3,162 square kilometres (1,221 sq mi), is an excellent example of the ecosystem of the Thar Desert and its diverse fauna. Seashells and massive fossilised tree trunks in this park record the geological history of the desert. The region is a haven for migratory and resident birds of the desert. One can see many eagles, harriers, falcons, buzzards, kestrels and vultures. Short-toed snake eagles (Circaetus gallicus), tawny eagles (Aquila rapax), spotted eagles (Aquila clanga), laggar falcons (Falco jugger) and kestrels are some of the raptor species seen in Desert National Park. Road traffic inside the Park is, however, a threat to several wild species of the park with several species of amphibians, reptiles, birds and mammals reported to have died as roadkill.

The Ranthambore National Park located in Sawai Madhopur, one of the well known tiger reserves in the country, became a part of Project Tiger in 1973.

Tal Chhapar Sanctuary is a very small sanctuary in Sujangarh, Churu District, 210 kilometres (130 mi) from Jaipur in the Shekhawati region. This sanctuary is home to a large population of blackbuck. Desert foxes and the caracal, an apex predator, also known as the desert lynx, can also be spotted, along with birds such as the partridge, harriers, eastern imperial eagle, pale harrier, marsh harrier, short-toed eagle, tawny eagle, sparrow hawk, crested lark, demoiselle crane, skylarks, green bee-eater, brown dove, black ibis, and sand grouse. The great Indian bustard, known locally as the godavan, and which is a state bird, has been classed as critically endangered since 2011.

=== Wildlife protection ===
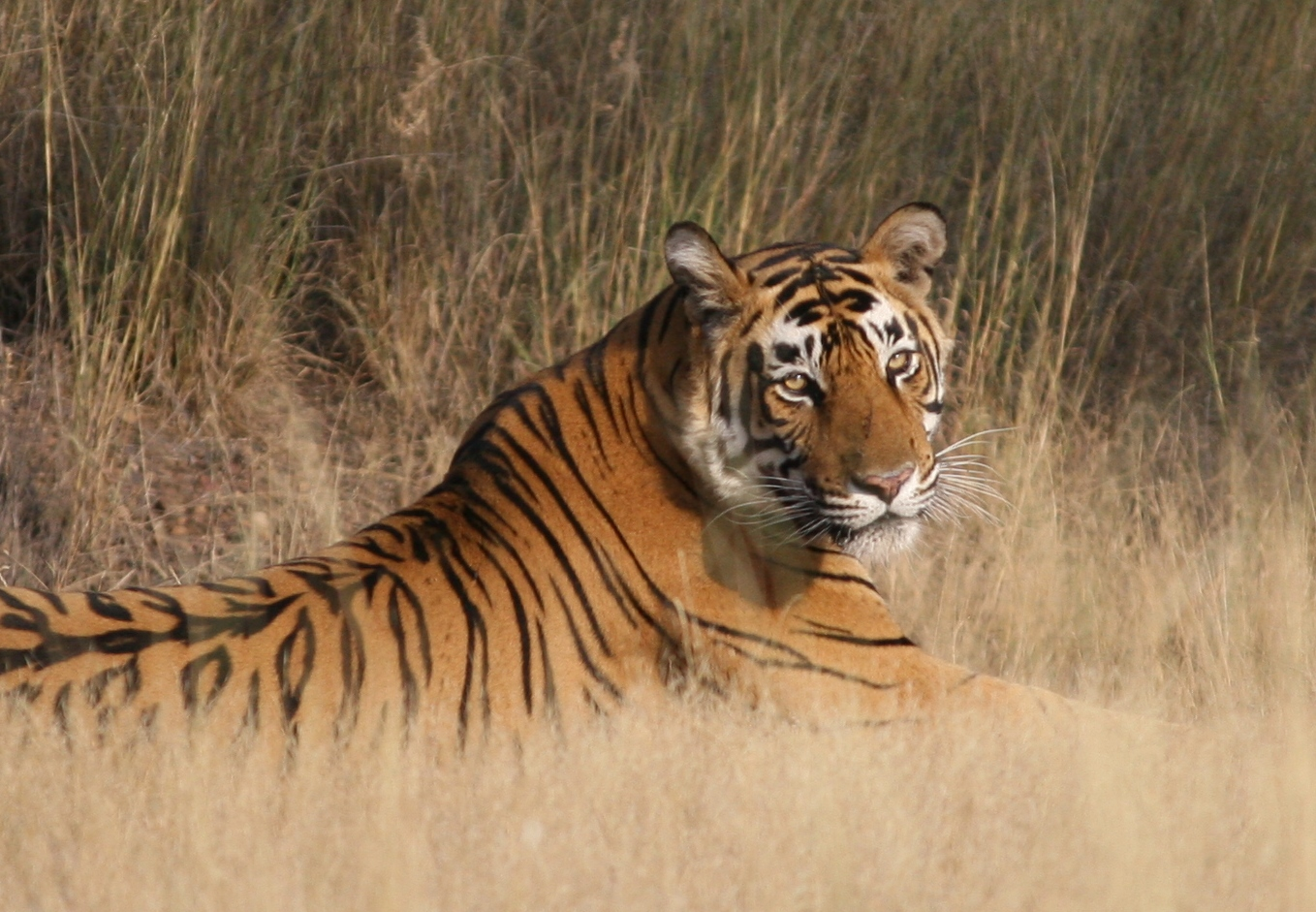
Reclining tiger, Ranthambore National Park

Rajasthan is also noted for its national parks and wildlife sanctuaries. There are four national parks and wildlife sanctuaries: Keoladeo National Park of Bharatpur, Sariska Tiger Reserve of Alwar, Ranthambore National Park of Sawai Madhopur, and Desert National Park of Jaisalmer. A national-level institute, Arid Forest Research Institute (AFRI) an autonomous institute of the ministry of forestry is situated in Jodhpur and continuously works on desert flora and their conservation.

Ranthambore National Park is 7 km from Sawai Madhopur Railway Station. It is known worldwide for its tiger population and is considered by both wilderness lovers and photographers as one of the best places in India to spot tigers. At one point, due to poaching and negligence, tigers became extinct at Sariska, but five tigers have been relocated there. Prominent among the wildlife sanctuaries are Mount Abu Sanctuary, Bhensrod Garh Sanctuary, Darrah Sanctuary, Jaisamand Sanctuary, Kumbhalgarh Wildlife Sanctuary, Jawahar Sagar Sanctuary, and Sita Mata Wildlife Sanctuary.

== Governance and administration ==
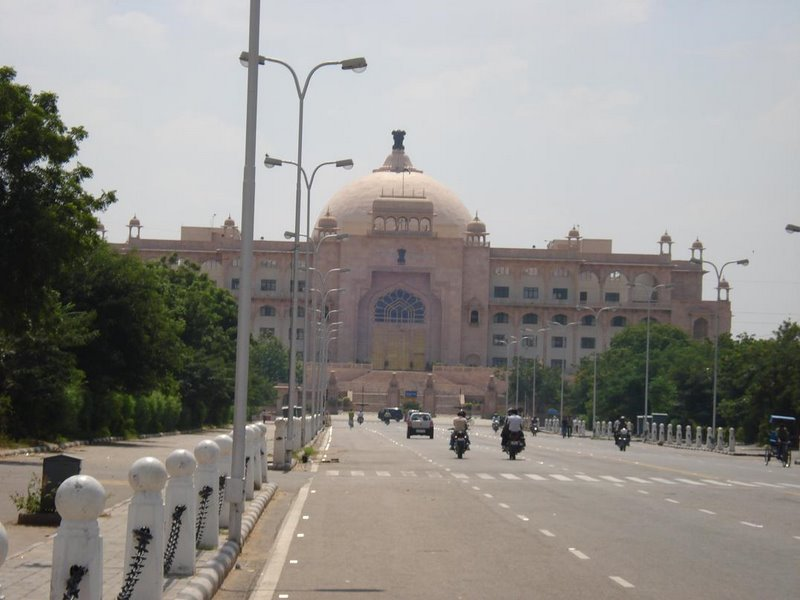
Rajasthan Legislative Assembly

The state is governed by a parliamentary system of representative democracy. The governor serves as the state's constitutional leader, whereas the chief minister assumes the role of both the head of the government and the head of the council of ministers. The Legislative Assembly consists of 200 members who are elected for five-year terms. The state contributes 25 seats to Lok Sabha, the lower house of the Indian Parliament, and 10 seats to Rajya Sabha, the upper house.

The Government of Rajasthan is a democratically elected body in India with the governor as its constitutional head. Governor is appointed by the President of India for a five-year term. The leader of the party or coalition with a majority in the Legislative Assembly is appointed as the chief minister by the governor, and the council of ministers are appointed by the governor on the advice of the chief minister. The governor remains a ceremonial head of the state, while the chief minister and his council are responsible for day-to-day government functions. The council of ministers consists of Cabinet Ministers, Ministers of State (MoS) and Deputy Ministers. The Secretariat headed by the Chief Secretary assists the council of ministers. The Chief Secretary is also the administrative head of the government. Each government department is headed by a minister, who is assisted by an Additional Chief Secretary or a Principal Secretary, who is usually an officer of Indian Administrative Service (IAS), the Additional Chief Secretary/Principal Secretary serve as the administrative head of the department they are assigned to. Each department also has officers of the rank of Secretary, Special Secretary, Joint Secretary etc. assisting the Minister and the Additional Chief Secretary/Principal Secretary.

For the administration purpose, the state is divided into 07 divisions and 41 districts. Divisional Commissioner, is the head of administration on the divisional level. The administration in each district is headed by a District Collector/District Magistrate, who is also an IAS officer, and is assisted by a number of officers belonging to Rajasthan Administrative Services. In Rajasthan, the police force is led by an IPS officer holding the position of Director General of Police. Each district is supervised by a Superintendent of Police, also an IPS officer, who is supported by officers from the Rajasthan Police Services. Their primary responsibility involves maintaining law and order and addressing relevant issues within their respective districts. The management of forests, environment, and wildlife in the district is overseen by the Divisional Forest Officer, who is a member of the Indian Forest Service. This responsibility is carried out with the assistance of officers from the Rajasthan Forest Service and Rajasthan Subordinate Service.

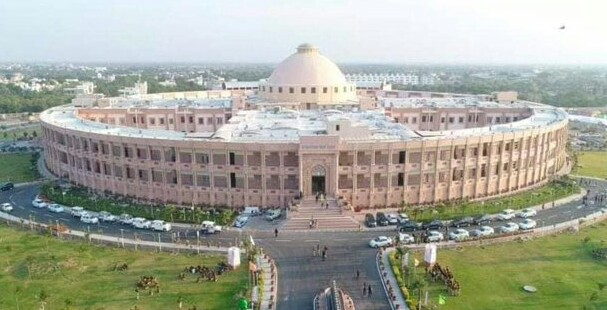
Rajasthan High Court

Rajasthan has its High court Jodhpur which has its principal seat at Jodhpur and a bench at Jaipur, with district courts and session courts in each district or Sessions Division, and lower courts at the tehsil level. The president of India appoints the chief justice of the High Court of Rajasthan judiciary on the advice of the Chief Justice of the Supreme Court of India as well as the governor of Rajasthan. In Rajasthan, the Subordinate Judicial Service is an essential component of the state's judiciary, and it is divided into two categories: the Rajasthan Civil Judicial Services and the Rajasthan Higher Judicial Service. The former includes Civil Judges (Junior Division)/Judicial Magistrates and Civil Judges (Senior Division)/Chief Judicial Magistrate. On the other hand, the latter consists of Civil and Sessions Judges. The District Judge has control over the Subordinate Judicial Service in Rajasthan.

The politics of Rajasthan has mainly been dominated mainly by the Bharatiya Janata Party and the Indian National Congress.

Chief Secretary Of Rajasthan is V. Srinivas and Director General of Police or DGP of Rajasthan is Umesh Mishra.

=== Regions, divisions, districts and cities ===
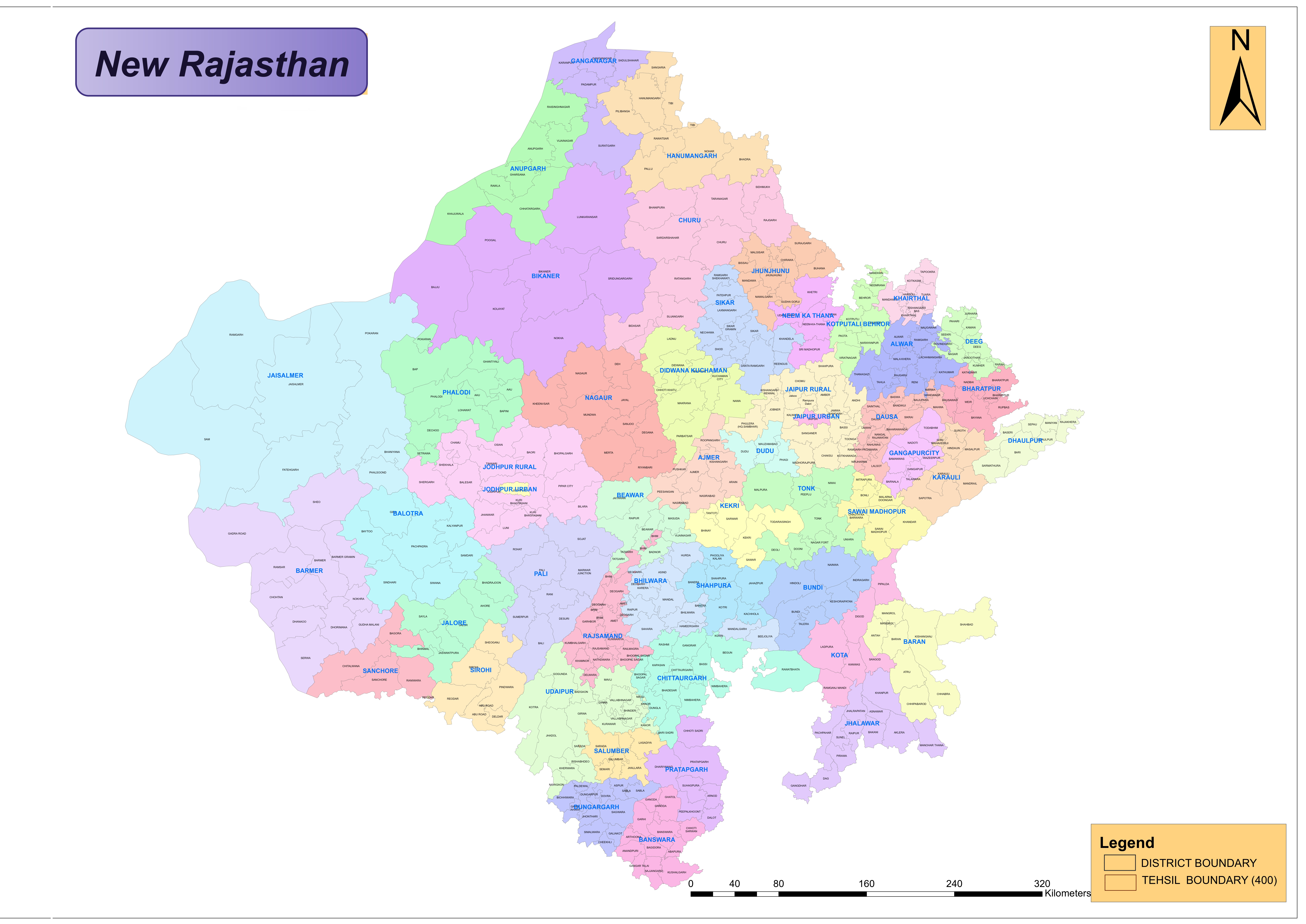
Districts of Rajasthan

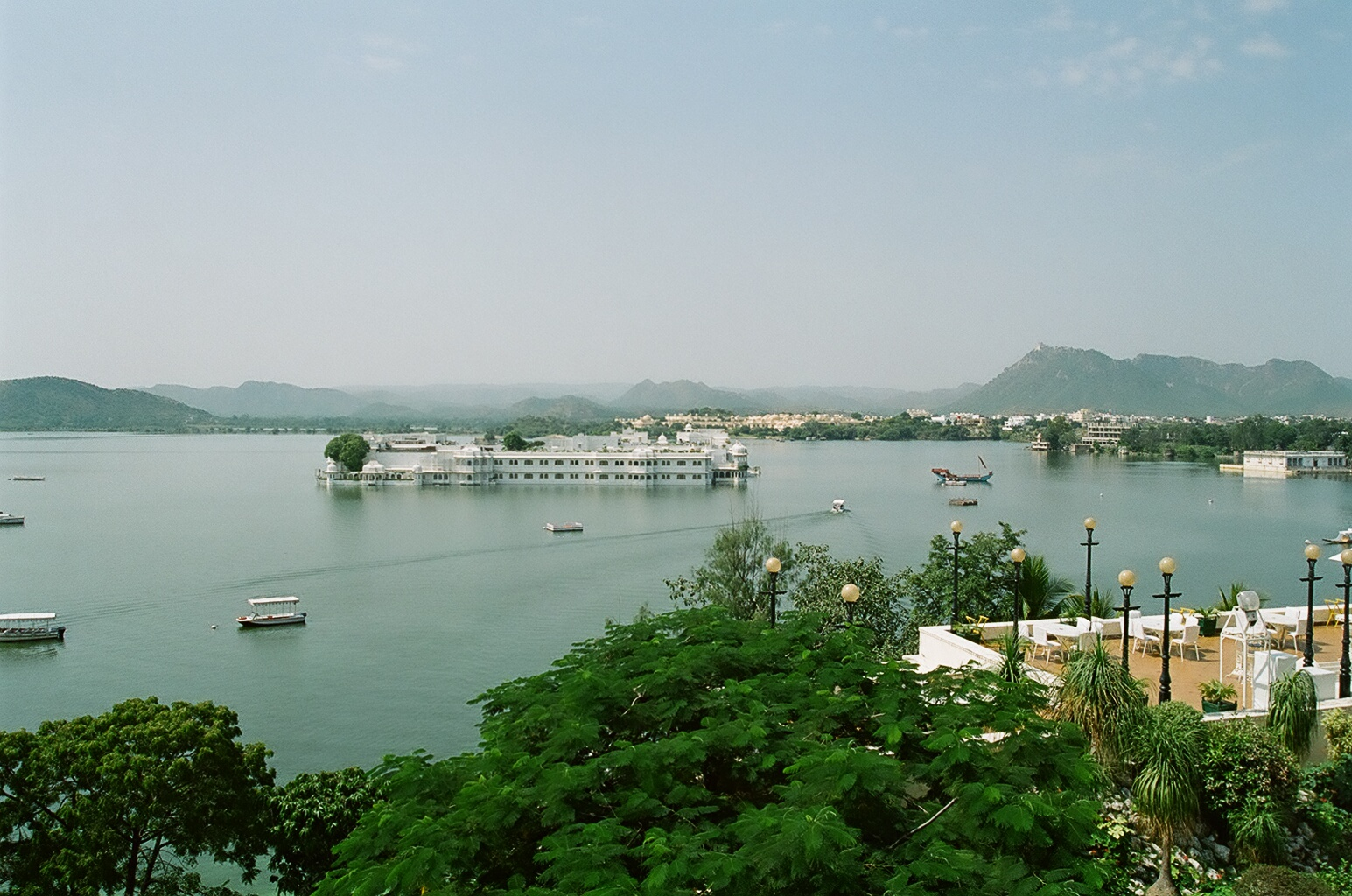
Lake Palace and Jag Mandir from a distance, Lake Pichola, Udaipur.

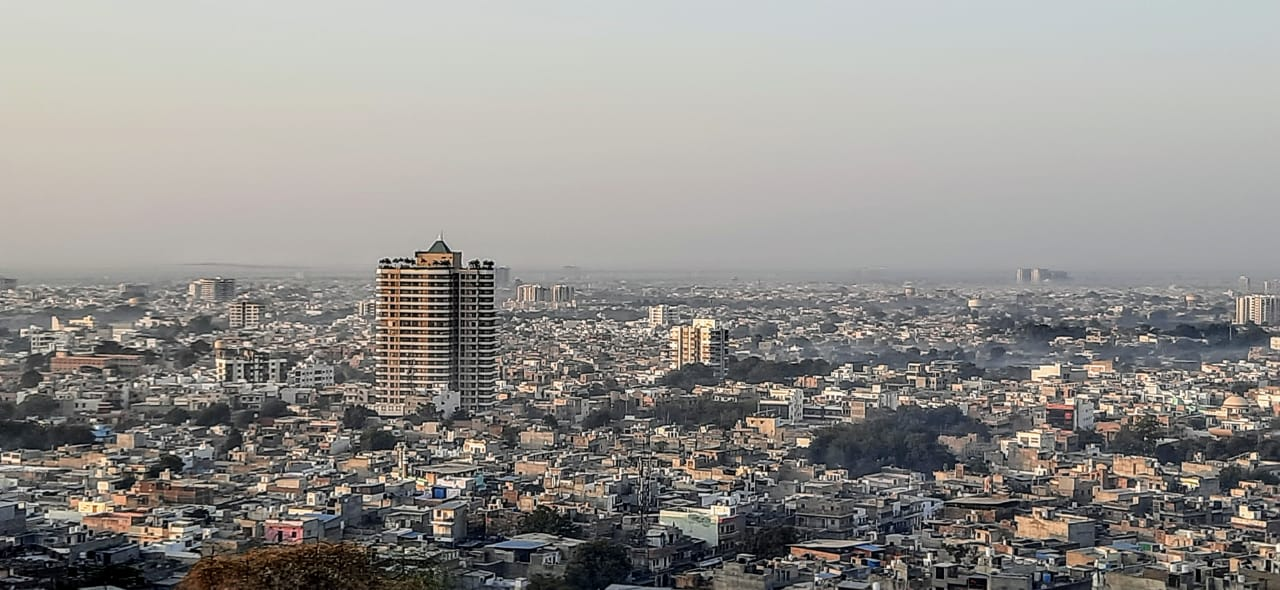
Modern Jodhpur skyline

Rajasthan is composed of the following geographical, political and historical regions:

1. Bagar
2. Hadoti
3. Dhundhar
4. Gorwar
5. Shekhawati
6. Mewar
7. Marwar
8. Vagad
9. Mewat
10. Brij
11. Ajmer-Merwara

Rajasthan is divided into 41 districts within 7 divisions:

Division	Districts
Ajmer	Ajmer; Beawar; Nagaur; Tonk; Didwana-Kuchaman
Bharatpur	Bharatpur; Deeg; Dholpur; Karauli; Sawai Madhopur
Bikaner	Bikaner; Jhunjhunun; Sri Ganganagar; Hanumangarh; Churu
Jaipur	Jaipur; Alwar; Khairthal-Tijara; Dausa; Dudu; Kotputli-Behror
Jodhpur	Barmer; Jaisalmer; Phalodi; Jodhpur; Balotra; Jalore; Pali; Sirohi
Kota	Baran; Bundi; Jhalawar; Kota
Udaipur	Udaipur; Salumbar; Chittorgarh; Bhilwara; Rajsamand; Banswara; Pratapgarh; Dungarpur

A district collector and district magistrate, who is appointed by the government from the cadre of Indian Administrative Service or Rajasthan Administrative Service, administer each district. Each district is divided into subdivisions headed by a Sub-Divisional Magistrate (SDM), comprising tehsils under Tehsildars, primarily responsible for land revenue administration. Additionally, districts are further divided into blocks for rural development administration, headed by Block Development Officers (BDOs). A block consists of panchayats (village councils).

Panchayat Samitis are intermediate level panchayat between the Zilla Parishad (district councils) at the district level and gram panchayat (village councils) at the lower level. These Panchayati Raj institutions govern rural areas of districts, with elections held every five years.

Rajasthan has 5 cities with over one million population. The absolute urban population of the state is 17.4 million, which constitutes 24.87% of the total urban population of the state. There are 10 municipal corporations, 34 municipal councils and 172 municipal boards or nagar parishads in the state. Jaipur, Jodhpur, and Kota have two municipal corporations each since October 2019, as their populations have exceeded 1 million.

== Communication ==
Major internet service provider (ISP) and telecom companies are present in Rajasthan including Vodafone Idea, BSNL, Airtel, Data Infosys Limited, Jio, RailTel Corporation of India, Software Technology Parks of India (STPI). Data Infosys was the first ISP to bring the internet to Rajasthan in April 1999 and OASIS was the first private mobile telephone company.

== Economy ==
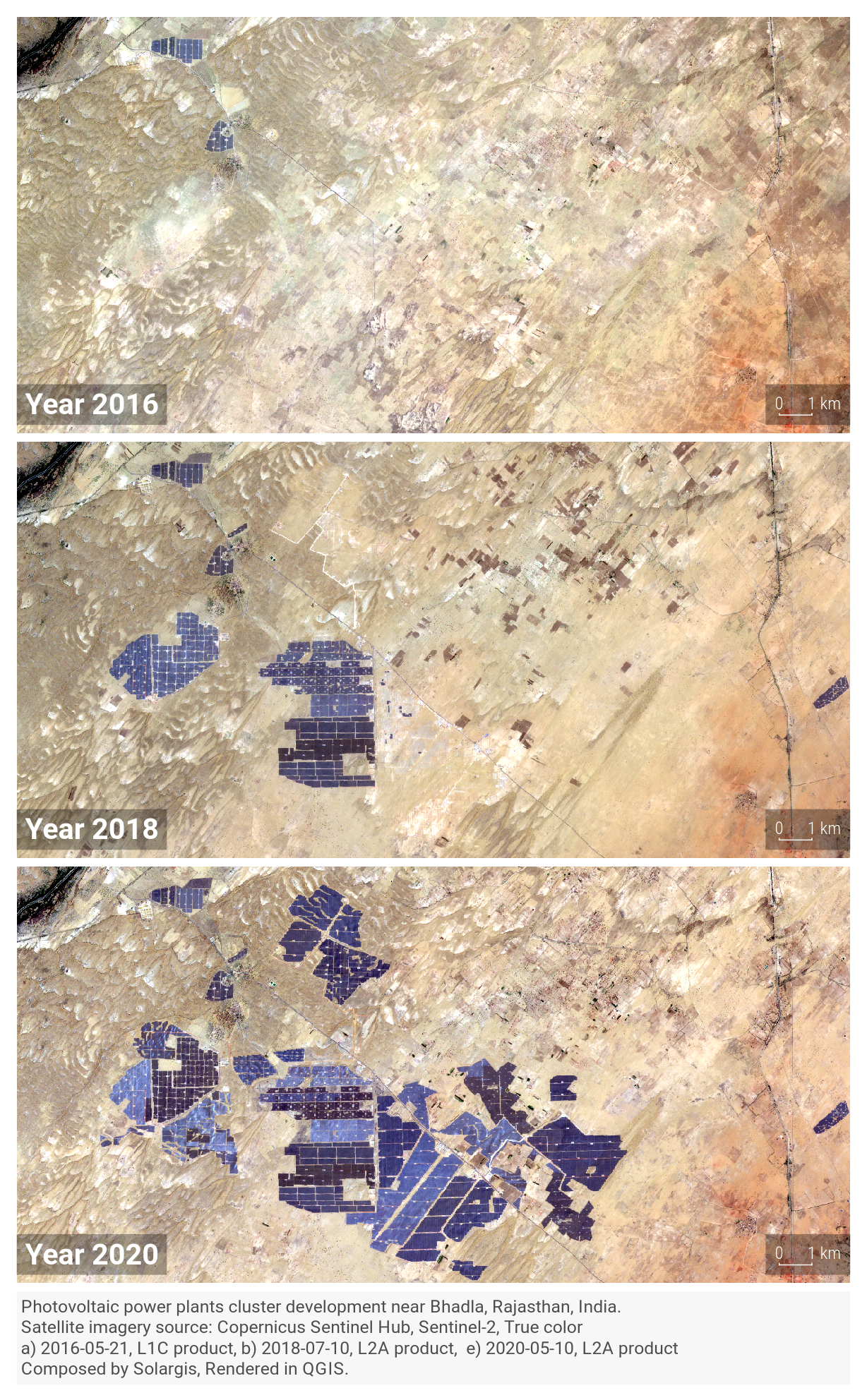
Timeline of the Bhadla Solar Park (India) development, the World's largest photovoltaic power plants cluster in 2020

Rajasthan's economy is primarily agricultural and pastoral. Wheat and barley are cultivated over large areas, as are pulses, sugarcane, and oilseeds. Cotton and tobacco are the state's cash crops. Rajasthan is among the largest producers of edible oils in India and the second-largest producer of oilseeds. Rajasthan is also the biggest wool-producing state in India and the main opium producer and consumer. There are mainly two crop seasons. The water for irrigation comes from wells and tanks. The Indira Gandhi Canal irrigates northwestern Rajasthan.

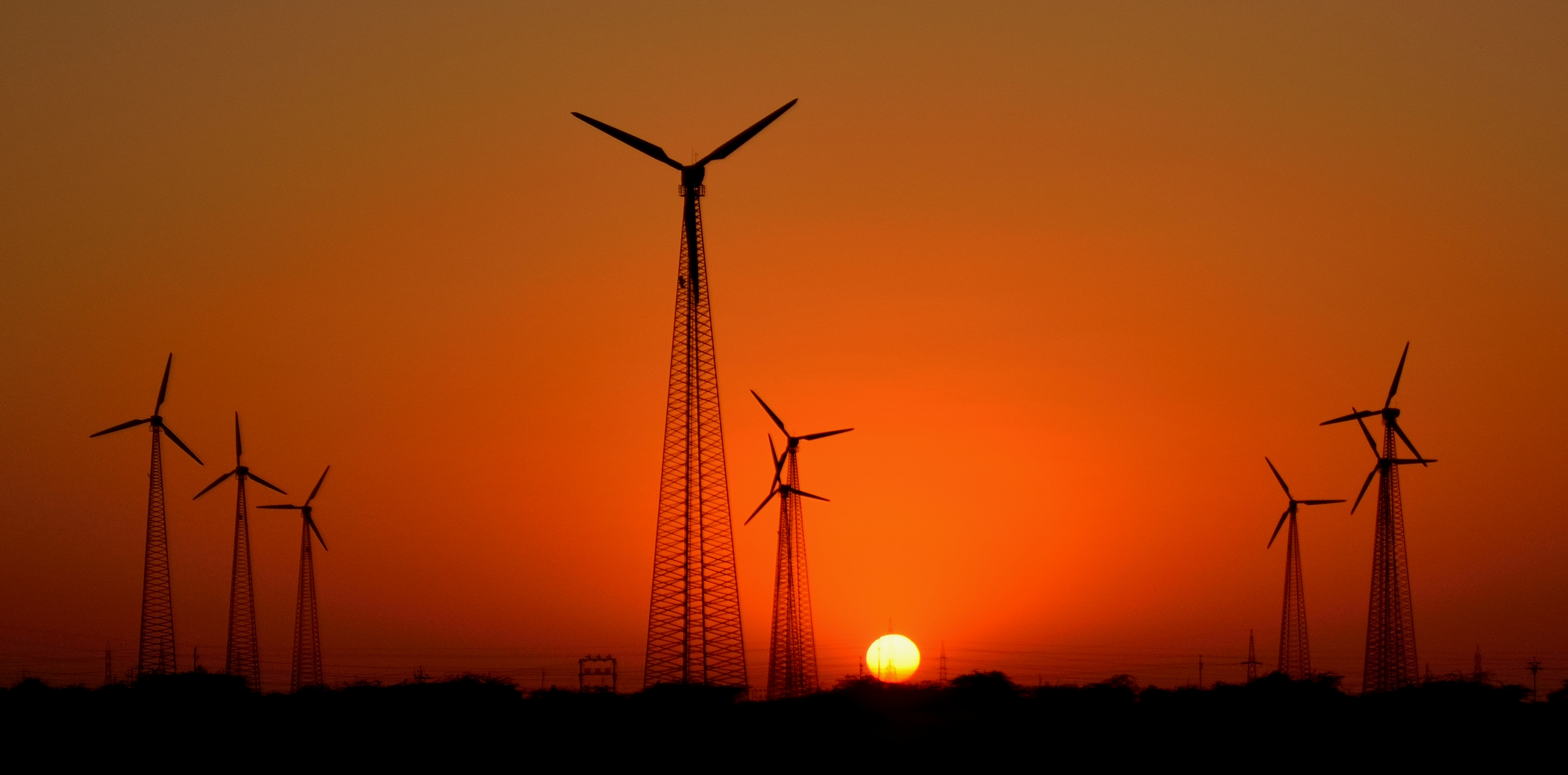
Wind turbines near Bada Bagh, Rajasthan.

The main industries are mineral based, agriculture-based, and textile based. Rajasthan is the second-largest producer of polyester fibre in India. Several prominent chemical and engineering companies are located in the city of Kota, in southern Rajasthan. Rajasthan is pre-eminent in quarrying and mining in India. The Taj Mahal was built from white marble which was mined from a town called Makrana. The state is the second-largest source of cement in India. It has rich salt deposits at Sambhar, copper mines at Khetri, Jhunjhunu, and zinc mines at Dariba, Zawar mines and Rampura Agucha (opencast) near Bhilwara. Dimensional stone mining is also undertaken in Rajasthan. Jodhpur sandstone is mostly used in monuments, important buildings, and residential buildings. This stone is termed as Chittar Patthar. Jodhpur leads in the handicraft and guar gum industries. Rajasthan is also a part of the Mumbai-Delhi Industrial corridor set to benefit economically. The state gets 39% of the DMIC, with major districts of Jaipur, Alwar, Kota and Bhilwara benefiting.

Rajasthan also has reserves of low-silica limestone.

Rajasthan connected 100% of its population to electricity power in 2019 (raising the rate of electricity access from 71% of the population in 2015). The renewable energy sector plays the most important role in the increase of generation capacities, with the main focus on solar energy. In 2020, Bhadla Solar Park was recognised as the largest cluster of photovoltaic power plants in a single region in the world, with the installed power exceeding the 2.2 gigawatt peak.

Rajasthan is also a significant producer of silver. The state produced 679.172 tonnes of silver in 2018–19, 609.153 tonnes in 2019–20, and 705.676 tonnes in 2020–21.

== Transportation ==
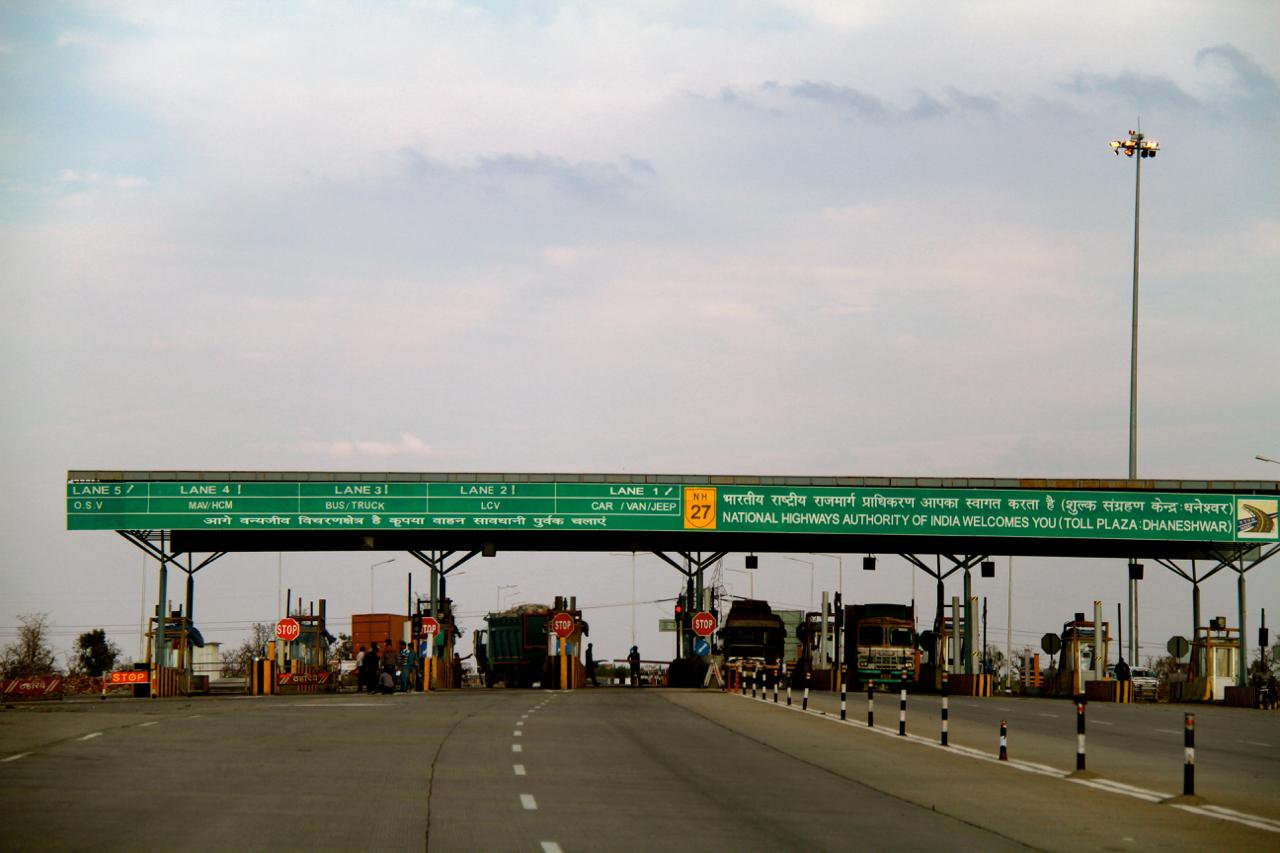
National, state, urban and rural road network in Rajasthan India. Udaipur, Chittorgarh, Kota, Sawaimadhopur, Ranthambhore, Jaipur

Rajasthan is connected by many national highways, the most renowned being NH 48, which is India's first 4–8 lane highway. Rajasthan also has an inter-city surface transport system both in terms of railways and bus network. All chief cities are connected by air, rail, and road.

=== Air ===
Jaipur International Airport (JAI) in Jaipur, is the state's largest, busiest and only international airport. Jaipur International Airport offers international service to Dubai, Bangkok, Sharjah and Muscat. There are five civilian airports in Rajasthan including Jodhpur Airport, Udaipur Airport, Ajmer Airport, Bikaner Airport and Jaisalmer Airport. Domestic airports are operated by the Airports Authority of India (AAI) and shares its airside with the Indian Air Force. These airports connect Rajasthan with the major cities of India such as Mumbai, Kolkata, Hyderabad, Chennai and Bangalore.

=== Railway ===
Railways length in the state constitute 8.66 per cent of all India route length. Jaipur Junction is the headquarters of the North Western Railway. Jaipur, Ajmer, Bikaner are the busiest railway stations in the state. Kota is the only electrified section served by three Rajdhani Expresses and trains to all major cities of India. Jaipur Superfast Express, fastest train under Superfast category of trains; connects the finance capital of India Mumbai to Jaipur. Luxury tourist train Maharajas' Express runs across North-West and Central India, mainly centred on Rajasthan. There is also an international railway, the Thar Express from Jodhpur (India) to Karachi (Pakistan). However, this is not open to foreign nationals. Jaipur Metro is the metro rail system in the city of Jaipur. It is the only metro rail system in Rajasthan and has been operational since 3 June 2015. It is the first metro in India to run on triple-storey elevated road and metro track.

=== Road ===
The state is served by a substantial road network, providing links between urban centres, agricultural market-places and rural areas. There are 33 national highways (NH) in the state, covering a total distance of 10,004.14 km (6,216.28 mi). The state has a total road length of 269,028 km (167,166 mi). The Department of Public Works is responsible for maintaining and expanding the state highways system and major district roads. Jaipur–Kishangarh Expressway forms a segment of the NH-48 which is a part of the Golden Quadrilateral project. Rajasthan State Road Transport Corporation (RSRTC) was established in 1964 to provide economical and reliable passenger road transport service in the state with connecting services to adjoining states. For travelling locally, the state, like most of the country, has auto rickshaws and cycle rickshaws. Average speed on state highways varies between 50 and 60 kilometres per hour (31–37 mph) due to the heavy presence of vehicles; in villages and towns, speeds are as low as 25–30 km/h (16–19 mph).

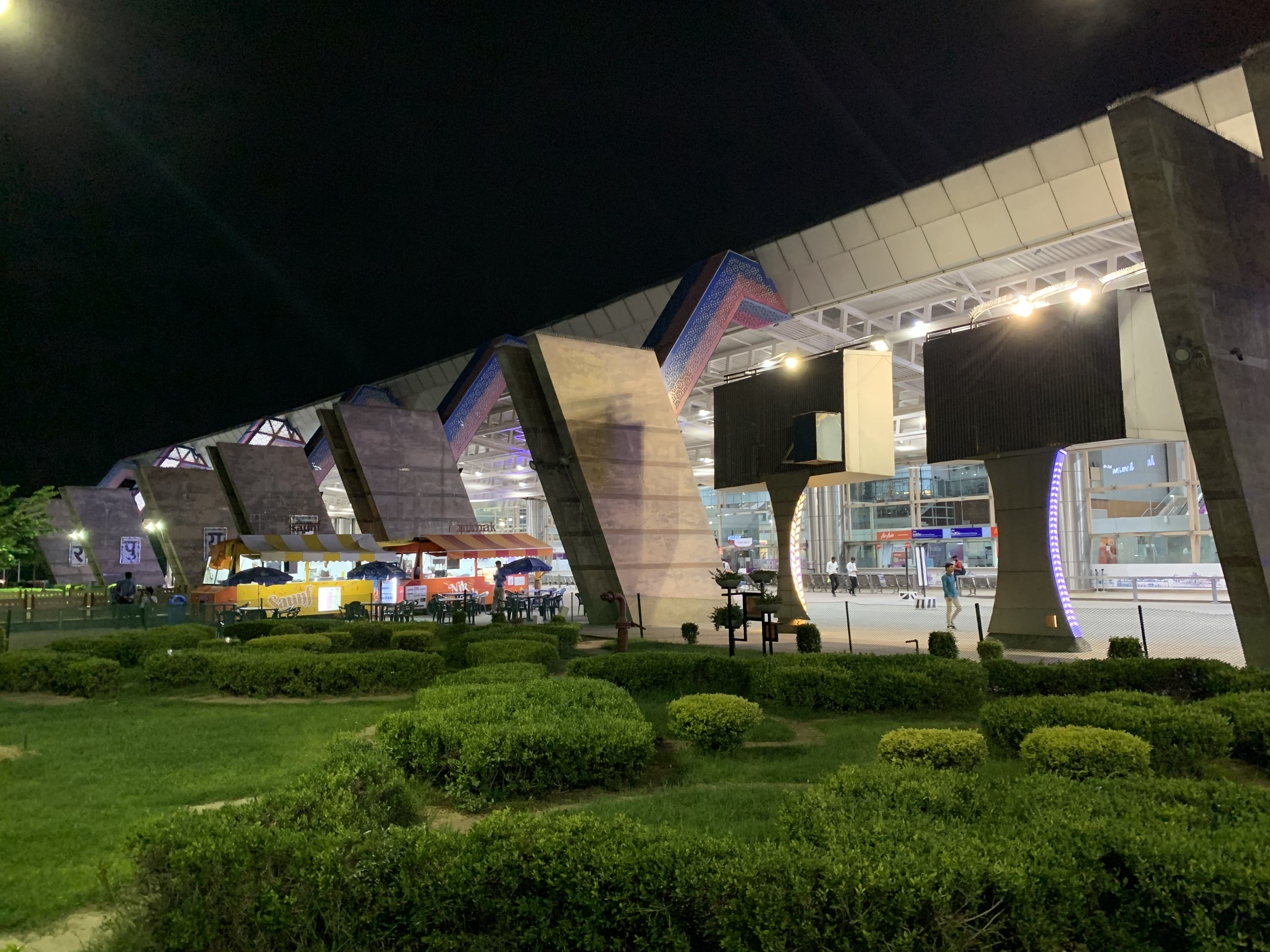
Jaipur International Airport

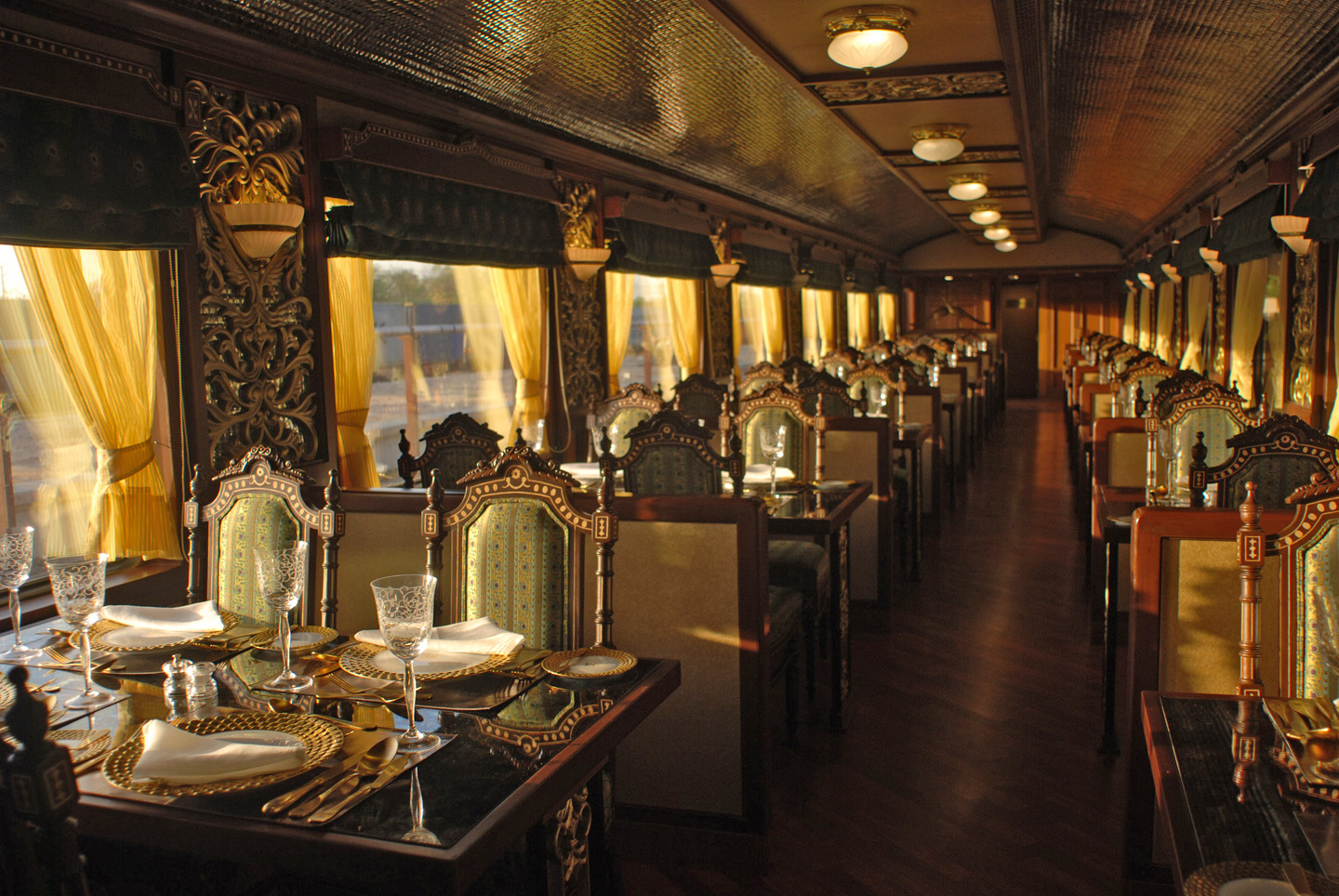
Maharajah's Express dining saloon

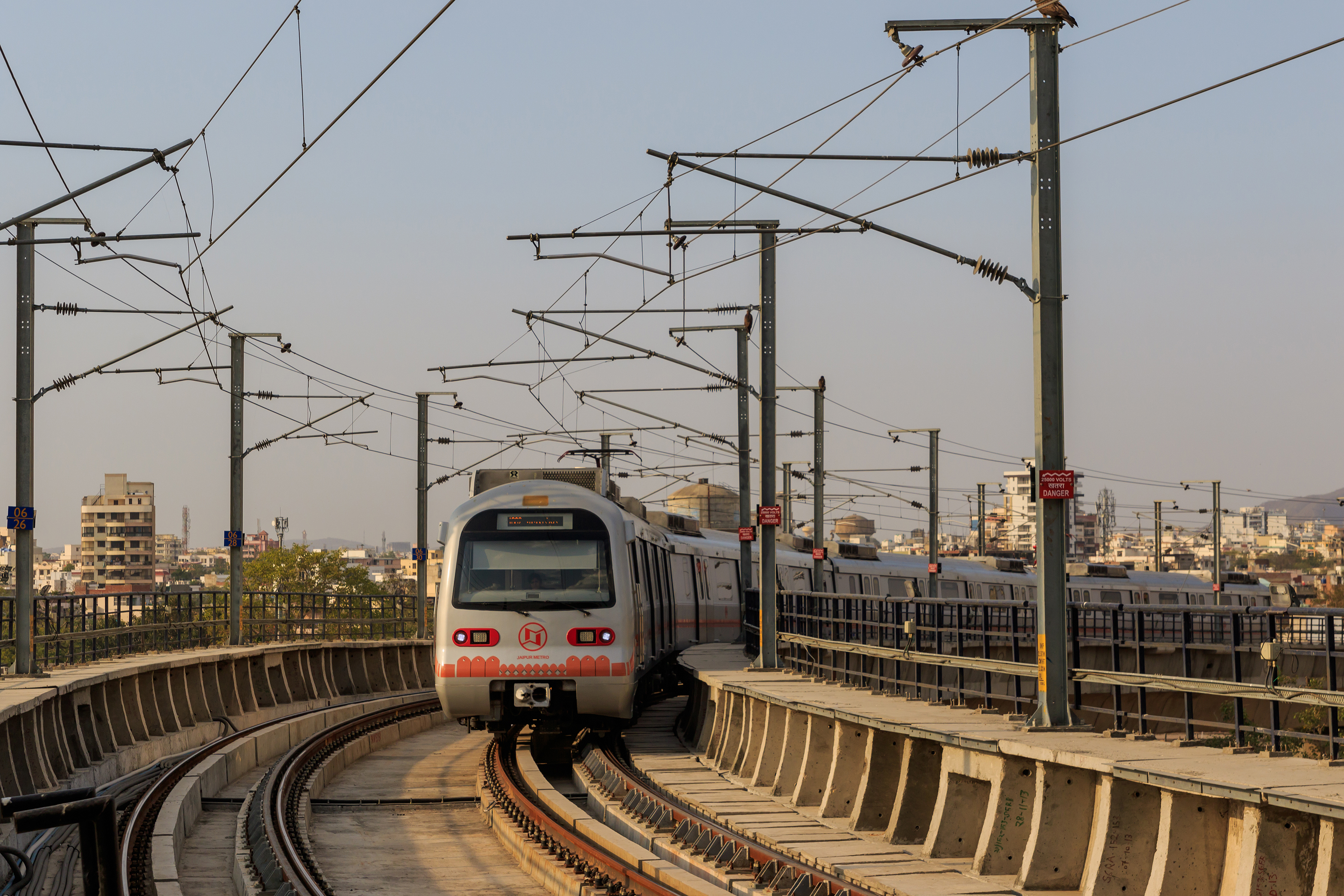
The Jaipur Metro is an important urban transportation link

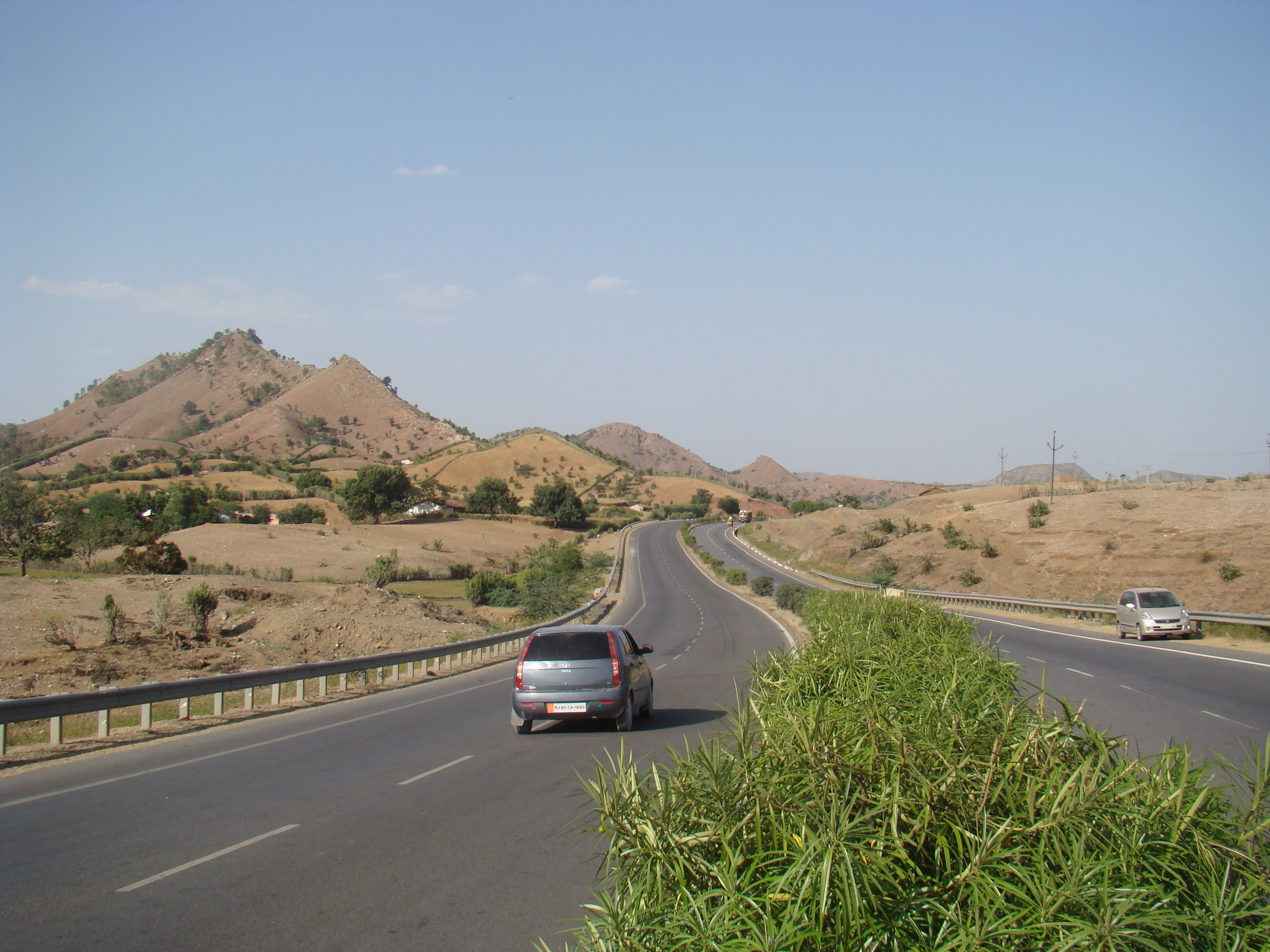
NH-48 between Udaipur and Ahmedabad

== Demographics ==
=== Population ===
Historical population
Year	Pop.	±% p.a.
1901	10,294,090	—
1911	10,983,509	+0.65%
1921	10,292,648	−0.65%
1931	11,747,974	+1.33%
1941	13,863,859	+1.67%
1951	15,970,774	+1.42%
1961	20,155,602	+2.35%
1971	25,765,806	+2.49%
1981	34,261,862	+2.89%
1991	44,005,990	+2.53%
2001	56,507,188	+2.53%
2011	68,548,437	+1.95%

According to the 2011 Census of India, Rajasthan has a total population of 68,548,437. The state contributes to 5.66% of India's population. The population density is 201 people per square kilometre. The sex ratio in 2011, at 928 women to 1000 men, was lower than the national figure of 943. The native Rajasthani people make up the majority of the state's population. The state of Rajasthan is also populated by Sindhis, who came to Rajasthan from Sindh province (now in Pakistan) during the India-Pakistan separation in 1947.

Brahmins, according to Outlook constituted 8% to 10% of the population of Rajasthan as per a 2003 report, but only 7% in a 2007 report. According to a 2007 DNA India report, 12.5% of the state are Brahmins. According to a report by Moneycontrol.com at the time of 2018 Rajasthan Legislative Assembly election, the Scheduled Caste (SC) population was 18%, Scheduled Tribe (ST) was 13%, Jats 12%, Gurjars and Rajputs 9% each, Brahmins and Meenas 7% each. A Hindustan Times report from 2019 also agrees to the total ST population of 13%, of which Meenas constitute the biggest group at 7%. According to a Deutsche Welle report, the Jats constitute 12–15% of the population of Rajasthan, followed by Meenas with 10% and Gurjars with 6%. While as per a 2007 BBC Hindi report, Meenas were 14% and Gurjars were 4% of the state's population.

Largest cities of Rajasthan by population
City	Population
Jaipur	3,073,349
Jodhpur	1,138,300
Kota	1,001,694
Bikaner	647,804
Ajmer	551,101
Udaipur	474,531
Bhilwara	360,009
Alwar	341,422
Bharatpur	252,838
Sri Ganganagar	249,914

=== Language ===
Languages of Rajasthan (2011)
1. Rajasthani (36.9%)
2. Hindi (27.3%)
3. Marwari (9.05%)
4. Mewari (6.10%)
5. Wagdi (5.54%)
6. Hadauti (4.29%)
7. Dhundari (2.15%)
8. Punjabi (1.68%)
9. Braj Bhasha (1.19%)
10. Bagri (1.03%)
11. Others (4.75%)

Hindi is the official language of the state, while English is the additional official language.

The languages of Rajasthan primarily belong to the Rajasthani group of Indo-Aryan languages. In the north are dialects of Punjabi and Bagri, which is a transition between Rajasthani and Punjabi. In the northeast Shekhawati and Dhundari are spoken which gradually merge with Haryanvi. In the east Mewati is spoken in the Mewat region, while in the far east Braj is spoken. To the southeast Haryanvi is spoken. To the west in the heart of the Thar Desert Marwari is spoken, which merges to Gujarati in the southwest. In the south, in the Mewar region, Mewari is spoken, while in the hills of Wagad, Wagdi, a Bhil language, is spoken. Many speakers of Rajasthani languages refer to their language as Hindi, and Standard Hindi is the medium of education and is common in cities. Urdu is also common in cities although the vast majority of Muslims speak one of the Rajasthani languages as their first language. Sindhi is also common in the cities and along the border with Sindh in Pakistan where Dhatki, a transition between Marwari and Sindhi, is the main dialect on both sides of the border. The literacy rate of Rajasthan was 66.11% according to the 2011 census of India.

The languages taught under the three-language formula are:

- First language: Hindi
- Second language: English
- Third language: Gujarati, Punjabi, Sanskrit, Sindhi or Urdu

=== Religion ===
Rajasthan's residents are mainly Hindus, who account for 88.49% of the population. Muslims make up 9.07%, Sikhs 1.27% and Jains 0.91% of the population.

Religion in Rajasthan (2011)
1. Hinduism (88.5%)
2. Islam (9.07%)
3. Sikhism (1.27%)
4. Jainism (0.91%)
5. Christianity (0.14%)
6. Buddhism (0.02%)
7. Other religions (0.10%)

Religious composition of Rajasthan
Religion	2011 Population	%
Hinduism	60,662,785	88.49
Islam	6,218,336	9.07
Sikhism	870,565	1.27
Jainism	623,791	0.91
Christianity	95,968	0.14
Buddhism	13,710	0.02
Other religions and persuasions	63,282	0.09
Total	68,548,437	100

== Culture ==
=== Food ===
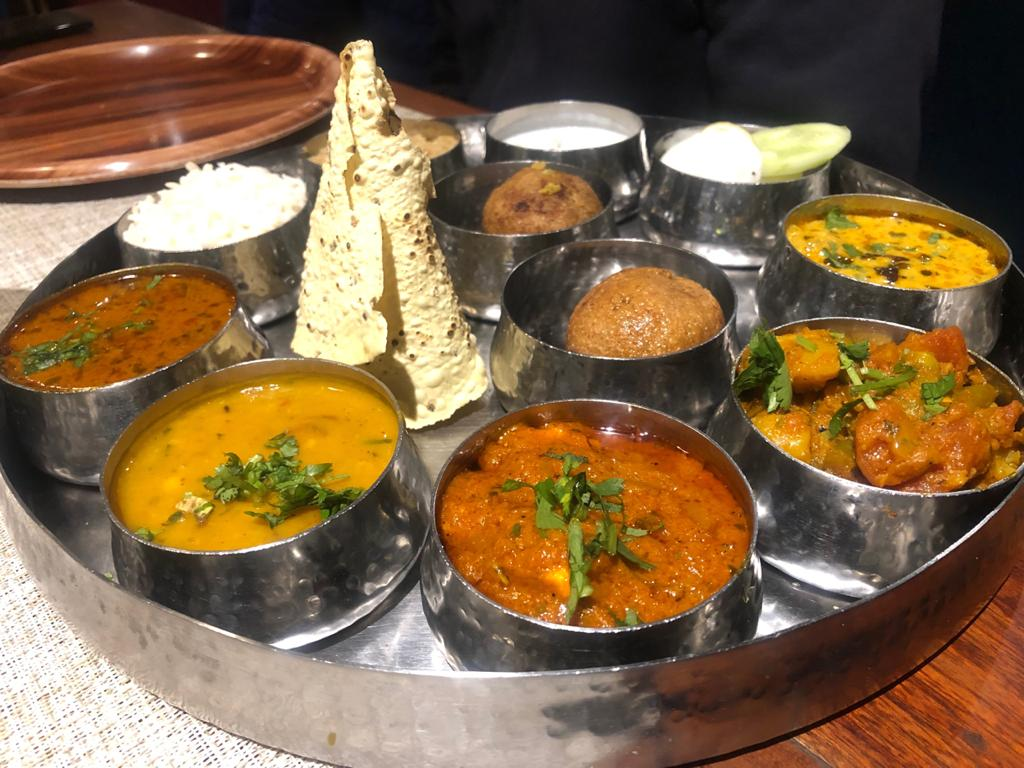
Rajasthani food

Rajasthani cooking was influenced by both the war-like lifestyles of its inhabitants and the availability of ingredients in this arid region. Food that could last for several days and could be eaten without heating was preferred. Thus, pickles of Rajasthan are quite famous for their tangy and spicy flavour. The Panchkuta delicacy is also a famous one – meaning 5 vegetables – a dish that lasts for several days, and is made out of certain weed plants that only grow in the wild desert. The scarcity of water and fresh green vegetables have all had their effect on cooking. It is known for its snacks like Bikaneri Bhujia. Other famous dishes include bajre ki roti (millet bread) and lahsun ki chutney (hot garlic paste), mawa kachori Mirchi Bada, Pyaaj Kachori and ghevar from Jodhpur, Alwar ka Mawa (milk cake), Kadhi kachori from Ajmer, Malpua from Pushkar, Daal kachori (Kota kachori) from Kota and rassgullas from Bikaner. Originating from the Marwar region of the state is the concept of Marwari Bhojnalaya or vegetarian restaurants, today found in many parts of India, which offer vegetarian food popular among Marwari people. Ghee is an essential ingredient in most Rajasthani cuisines, and dollops of ghee are poured over food as a welcoming gesture for guests.

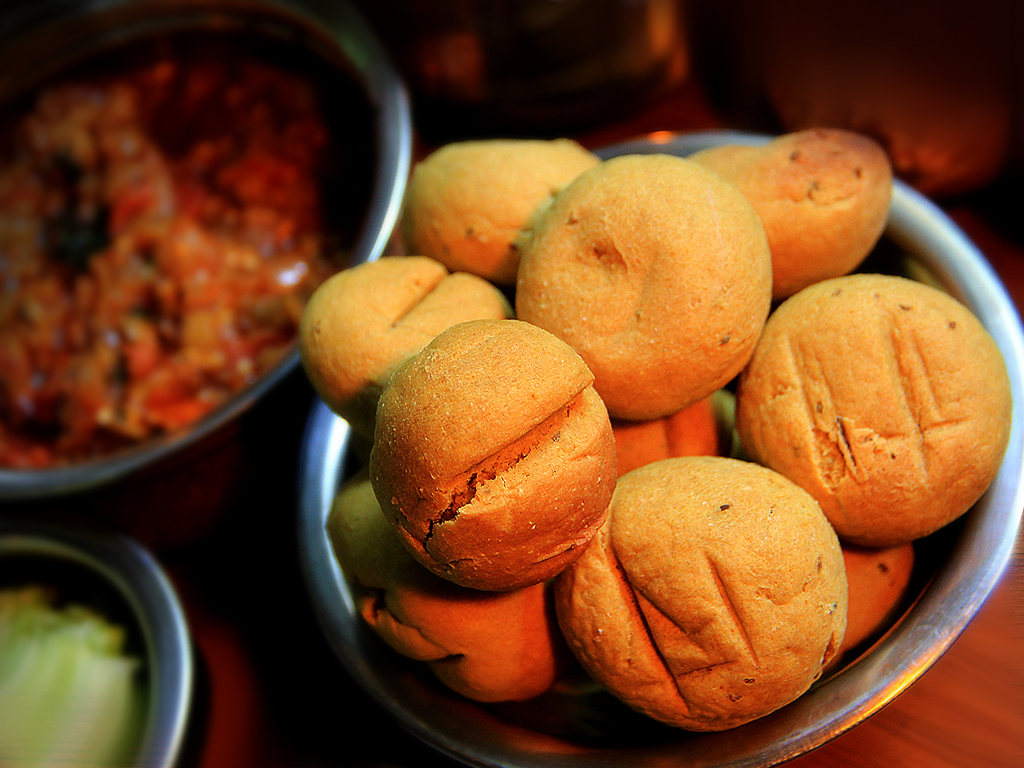
Dal Bati Choorma, a traditional Rajasthani Dish

Dal-baati-churma is very popular in Rajasthan. The traditional way to serve it is to first coarsely mash the baati, and then pour pure ghee on top of it. It is served with daal (lentils) and spicy garlic chutney; it is also served with besan (gram flour) ki kadi. It is commonly served at all festivities, including religious occasions, wedding ceremonies, and birthday parties in Rajasthan.

=== Music and dance ===
The Ghoomar dance from Jaipur, Jodhpur, and Kalbelia of the Kalbelia tribe has gained international recognition. Folk music is a large part of the Rajasthani culture. The Manganiyar, Meena and Langa communities from Rajasthan are notable for their folk music. Kathputli, Bhopa, Chang, Teratali, Ghindr, Gair dance, Kachchhi Ghori, and Tejaji are examples of traditional Rajasthani culture. Folk songs are commonly ballads that relate heroic deeds and love stories; and religious or devotional songs, known as bhajans and banis, which are often accompanied by musical instruments like dholak, sitar, and sarangi are also sung.

=== Art ===
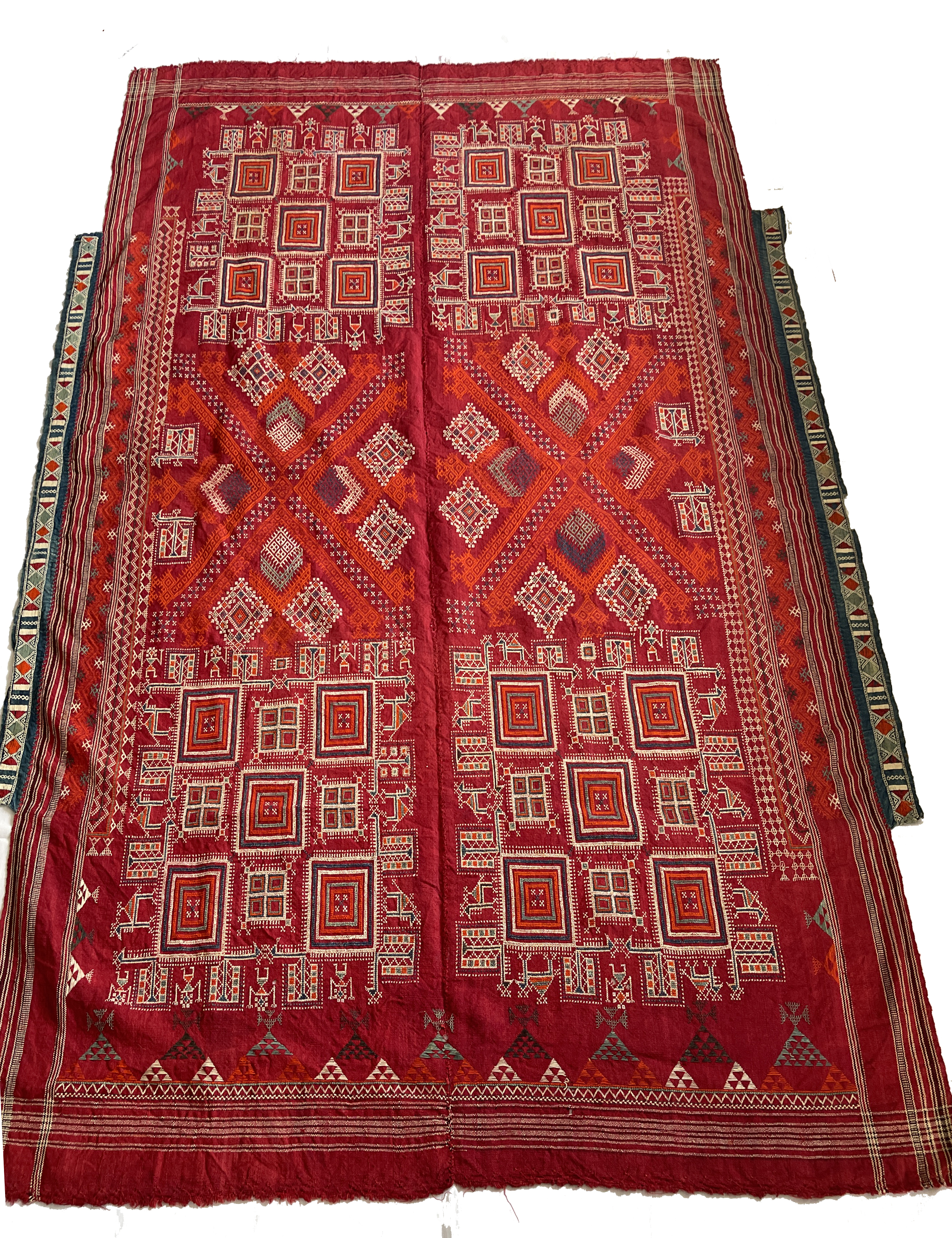
Vintage Textile Art Shawl Odhana Textile with traditional motifs from Rajasthan, courtesy The Wovensouls collection, Singapore

Rajasthan is known for its traditional, colourful art. The block prints, tie and dye prints, gota patti (main), Bagaru prints, Sanganer prints, and Zari embroidery are major export products from Rajasthan. Handicraft items like wooden furniture and crafts, carpets, and blue pottery are commonly found here. Shopping reflects the colourful culture, Rajasthani clothes have a lot of mirror work and embroidery. Traditional Rajasthani dress for females consists of an ankle-length skirt and a short top, known as chaniya choli. A piece of cloth is used to cover the head, both for protection from heat and maintenance of modesty. Rajasthani dresses are usually designed in bright colours such as blue, yellow, and orange.

== Education ==
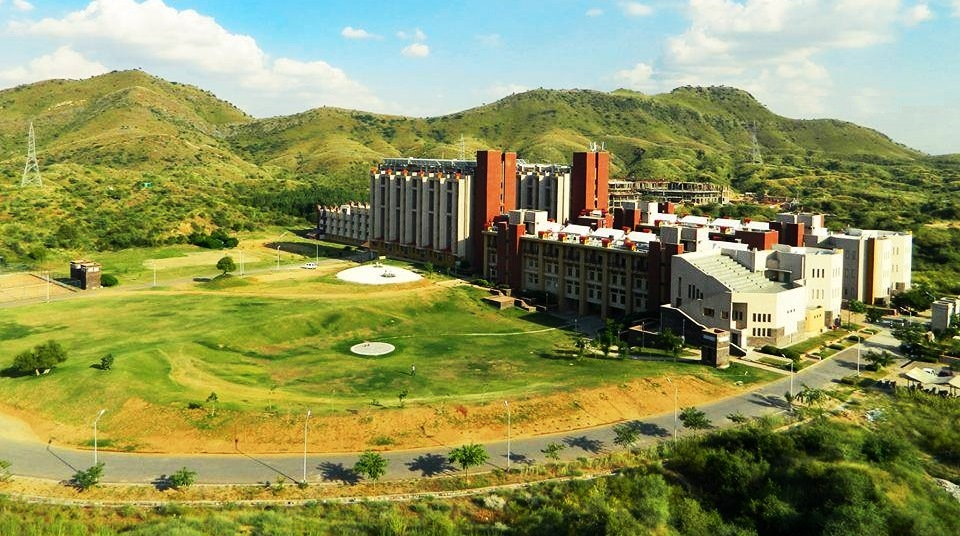
NIIT University in Neemrana, Rajasthan

In recent years, Rajasthan has worked on improving education. The state government has been making sustained efforts to raise the education standard.

Schools in the state are either managed by the government or by private trusts. The medium of instruction in most of the schools is mainly English, or Hindi. Under the 10+2+3 plan, after completing secondary school, students typically enroll for two years in a junior college, also known as pre-university, or in schools with a higher secondary facility affiliated with the Board of Secondary Education or any central board. Students choose from one of three streams, namely liberal arts, commerce, or science. Upon completing the required coursework, students may enrol in general or professional degree programs. The secondary schools are affiliated with the Council for the Indian School Certificate Examinations (CISCE), the Central Board for Secondary Education (CBSE), and the National Institute of Open School (NIOS).

Rajasthan has 52 universities, 26 state funded public universities, 7 deemed universities, an IIT in Jodhpur, an IIM in Udaipur, an NIT in Jaipur, a National Law University in Jodhpur, and one central and state-run university. Kota, is renowned for being a hub for training students in various national-level competitive exams that are necessary for securing admission to engineering and medical colleges across the country. In order to promote a reading culture among the rural population, the state has established new libraries up to the panchayat level and computerised all public libraries throughout the state, providing modern amenities to readers and subscriber.

=== Literacy ===
In recent decades the literacy rate of Rajasthan has increased significantly. In 1991, the state's literacy rate was only 38.55% (54.99% male and 20.44% female). In 2001, the literacy rate increased to 60.41% (75.70% male and 43.85% female). This was the highest leap in the percentage of literacy recorded in India (the rise in female literacy being 23%). At the Census 2011, Rajasthan had a literacy rate of 67.06% (80.51% male and 52.66% female). Although Rajasthan's literacy rate is below the national average of 74.04% and although its female literacy rate is the lowest in the country, the state has been praised for its efforts and achievements in raising literacy rates.

In rural areas of Rajasthan, the literacy rate is 76.16% for males and 45.8% for females. This has been debated across all the party levels, when the governor of Rajasthan set a minimum educational qualification for the village panchayat elections.

== Tourism ==
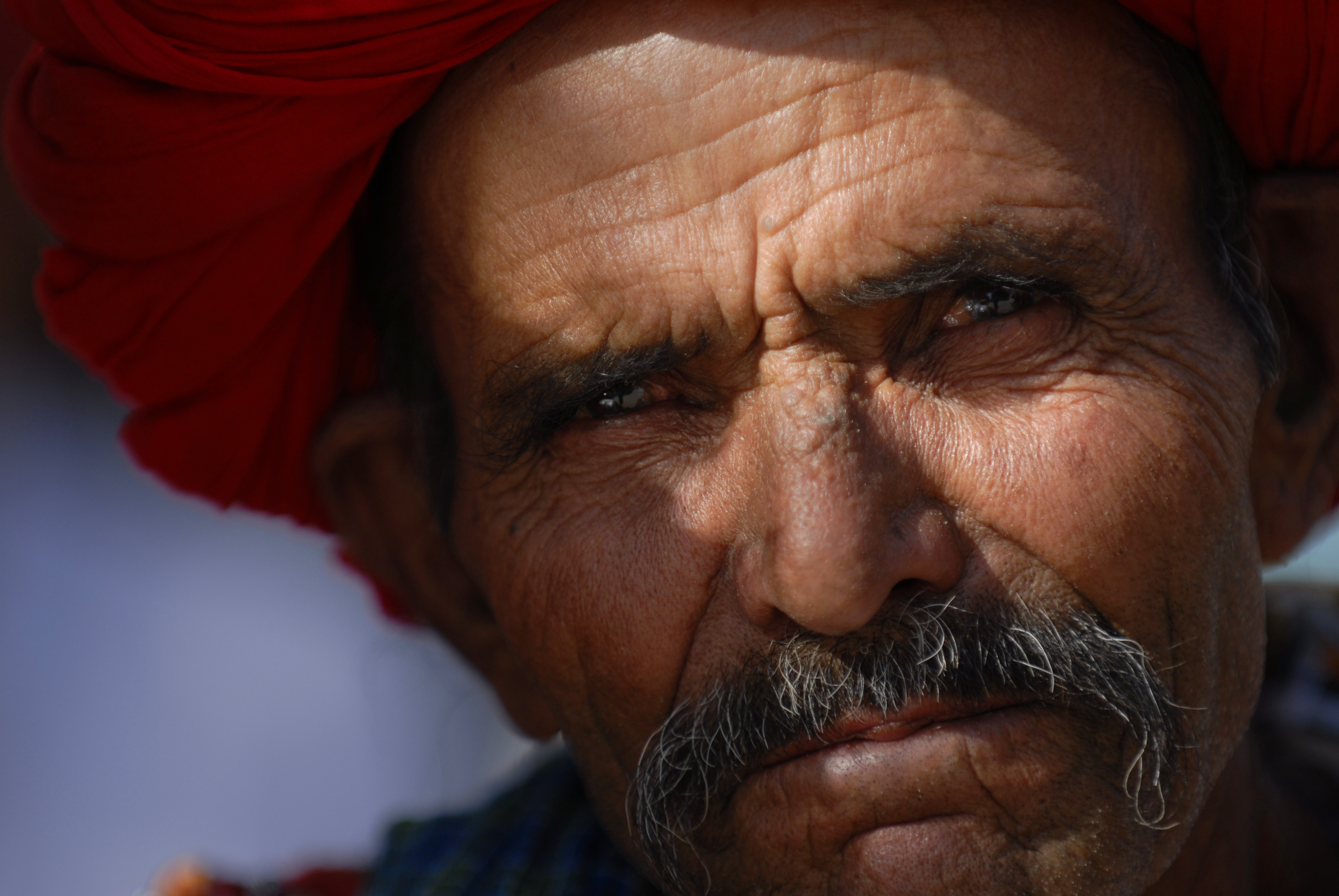
Man in Rajasthan, India.

Rajasthan attracted a total of 45.9 million domestic and 1.6 million foreign tourists in 2017, which is the tenth highest in terms of domestic visitors and fifth highest in foreign tourists. The tourism industry in Rajasthan is growing effectively each year and is becoming one of the major income sources for the state government. Rajasthan is home to many attractions for domestic and foreign travellers, including the forts and palaces of Jaipur, the lakes of Udaipur, the temples of Rajsamand and Pali, sand dunes of Jaisalmer and Bikaner, Havelis of Mandawa and Fatehpur, the wildlife of Sawai Madhopur, the scenery of Mount Abu, the tribes of Dungarpur and Banswara, and the cattle fair of Pushkar.

Rajasthan is known for its customs, culture, colours, majestic forts, and palaces, folk dances and music, local festivals, local food, sand dunes, carved temples and Havelis. Rajasthan's Jaipur Jantar Mantar, Mehrangarh Fort and Stepwell of Jodhpur, Dilwara Temples, Chittor Fort, Lake Palace, miniature paintings in Bundi, and numerous city palaces and Havelis are part of the architectural heritage of India. Jaipur, the Pink City, is noted for the ancient houses made of a type of sandstone dominated by a pink hue. In Jodhpur, most houses are painted blue. At Ajmer, there is white marble Bara-dari on the Anasagar lake and Soniji Ki Nasiyan. Jain Temples dot Rajasthan from north to south and east to west. Dilwara Temples of Mount Abu, Shrinathji Temple of Nathdwara, Ranakpur Jain temple dedicated to Lord Adinath in Pali District, Jain temples in the fort complexes of Chittor, Jaisalmer and Kumbhalgarh, Lodurva Jain temples, Mirpur Jain Temple of Sirohi, Sarun Mata Temple at Kotputli, Bhandasar and Karni Mata Temple of Bikaner and Mandore of Jodhpur are some of the best examples. Keoladeo National Park, Ranthambore National Park, Sariska Tiger Reserve, Tal Chhapar Sanctuary, are wildlife attractions of Rajasthan. Mewar festival of Udaipur, Teej festival and Gangaur festival in Jaipur, Desert festival of Jodhpur, Brij Holi of Bharatpur, Matsya festival of Alwar, Kite festival of Jodhpur, Kolayat fair in Bikaner, Dussehra fair in kota, Dol fair in Baran are some of the most popular fairs and festivals of Rajasthan.

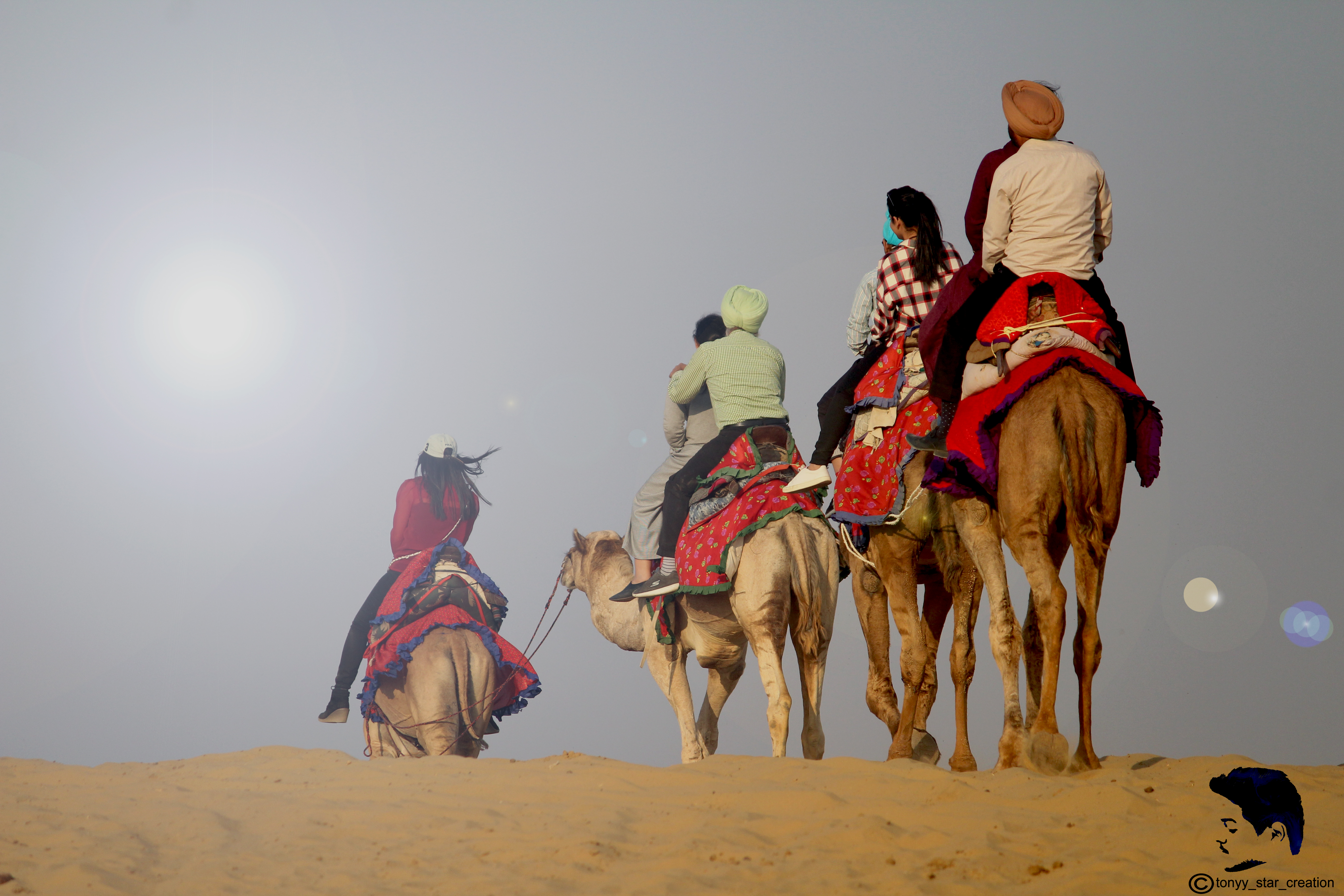
Camel rides in Thar desert

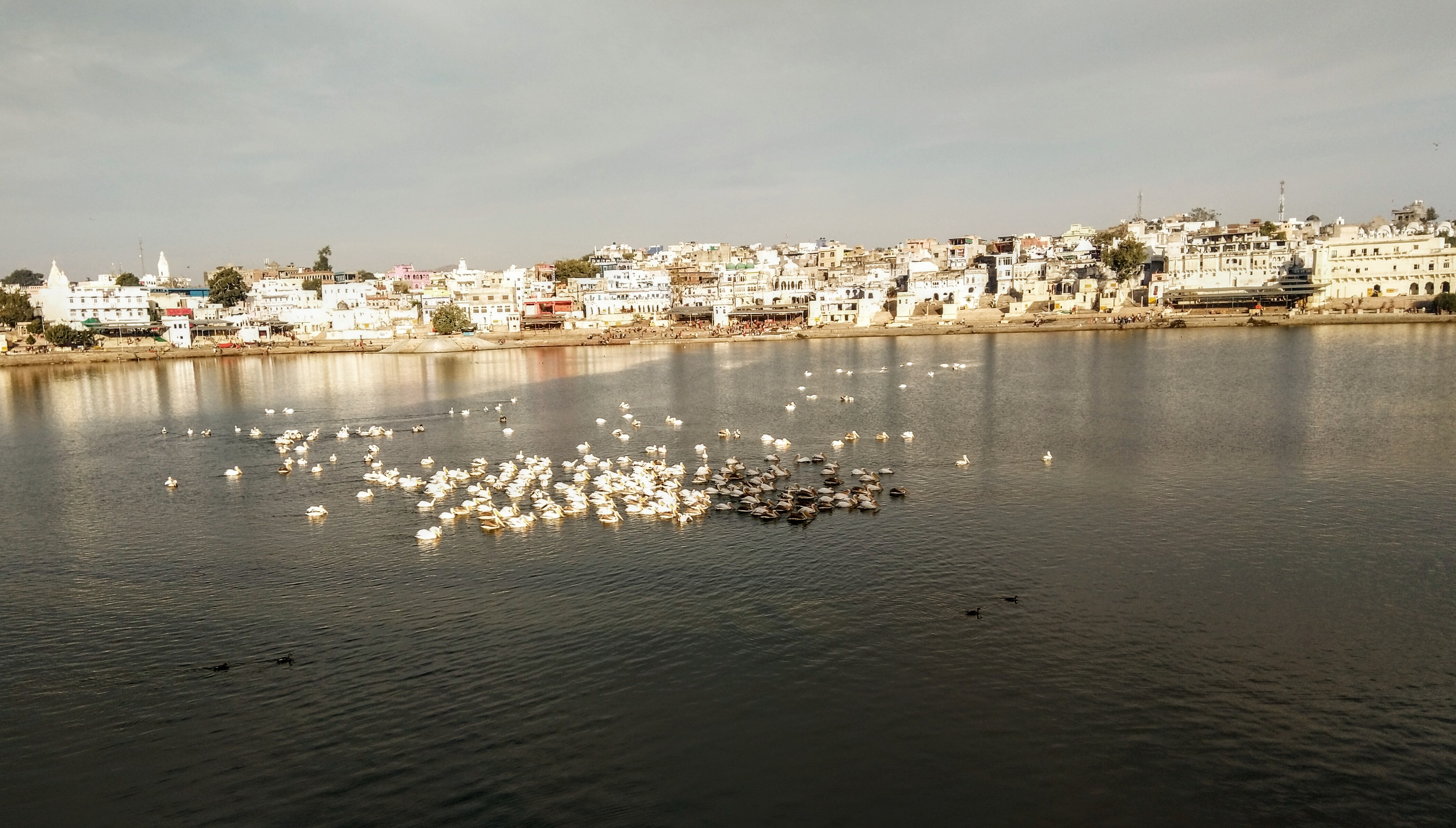
Pushkar Lake and Ghat

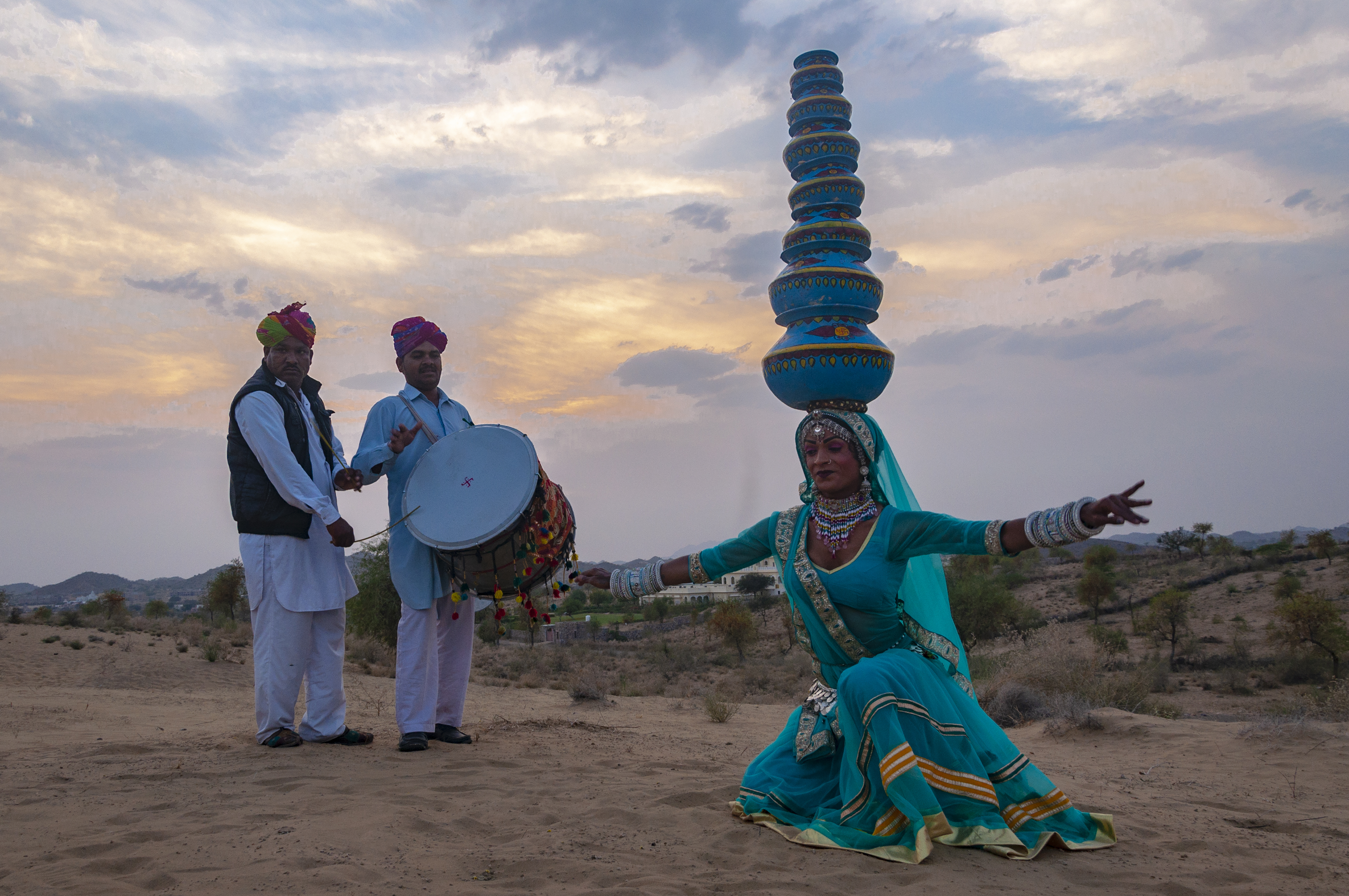
Kalbelia, a folk dance popular in Rajasthan

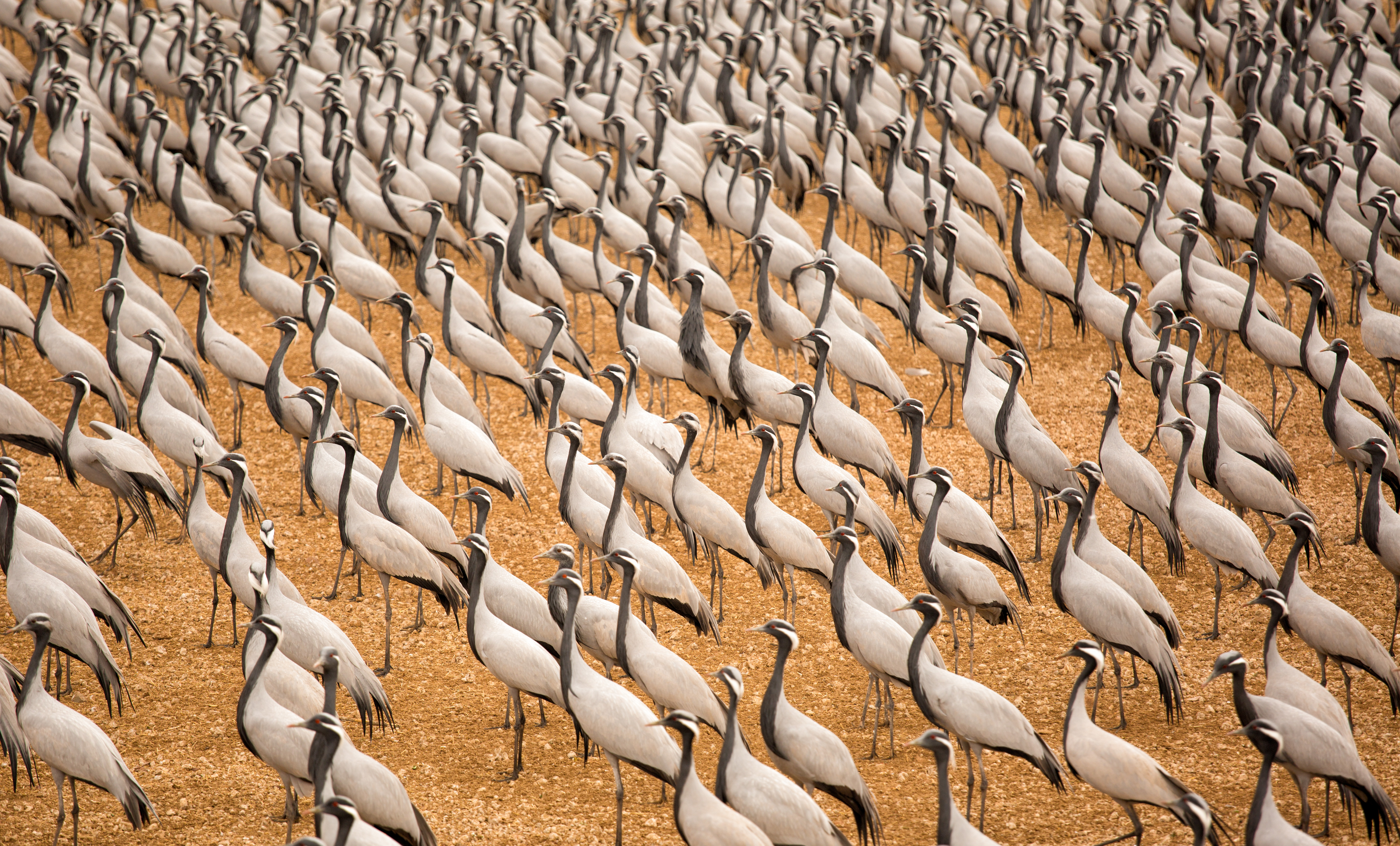
Demoiselle cranes in Khichan near Bikaner

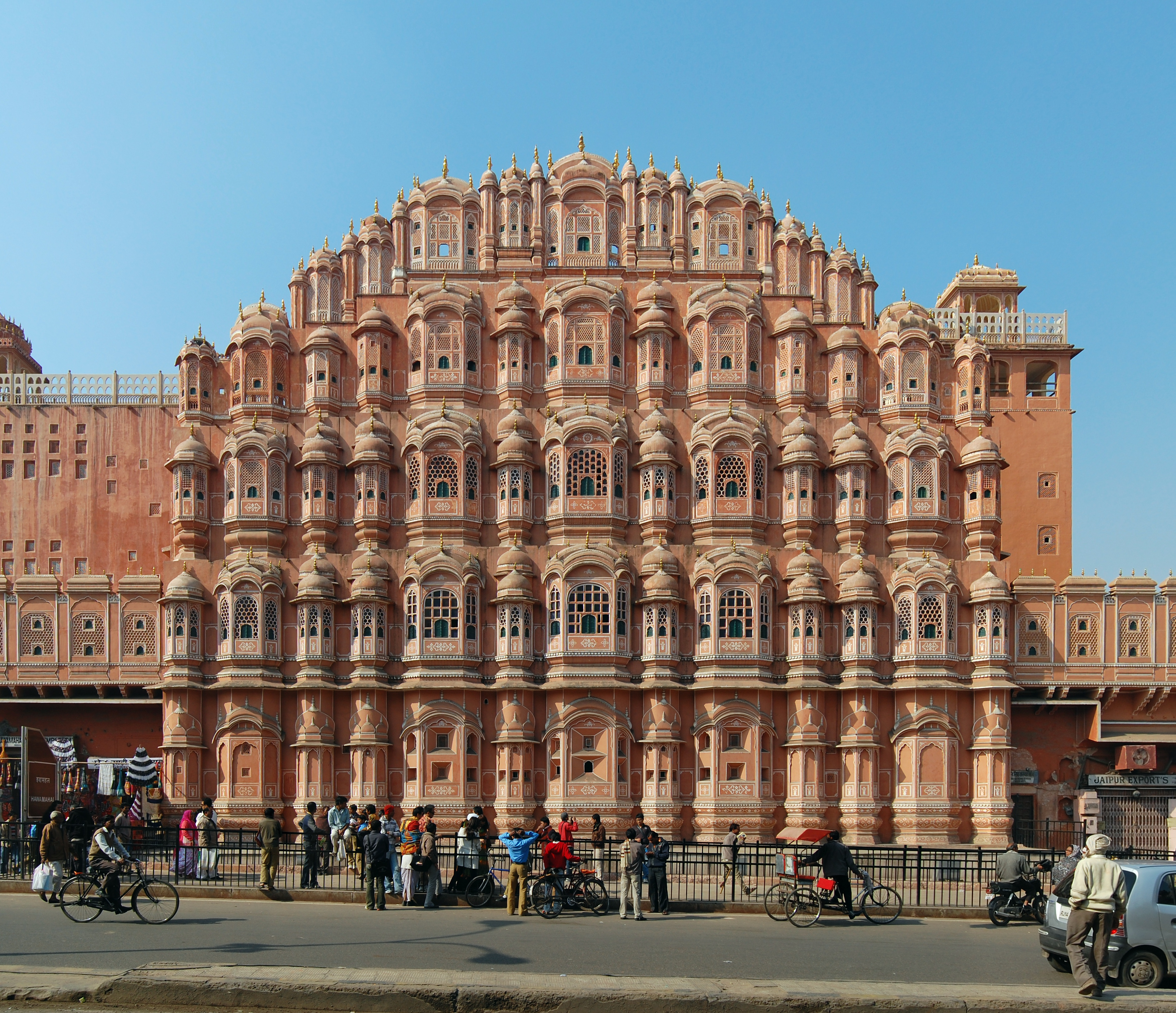
Hawa Mahal, Jaipur

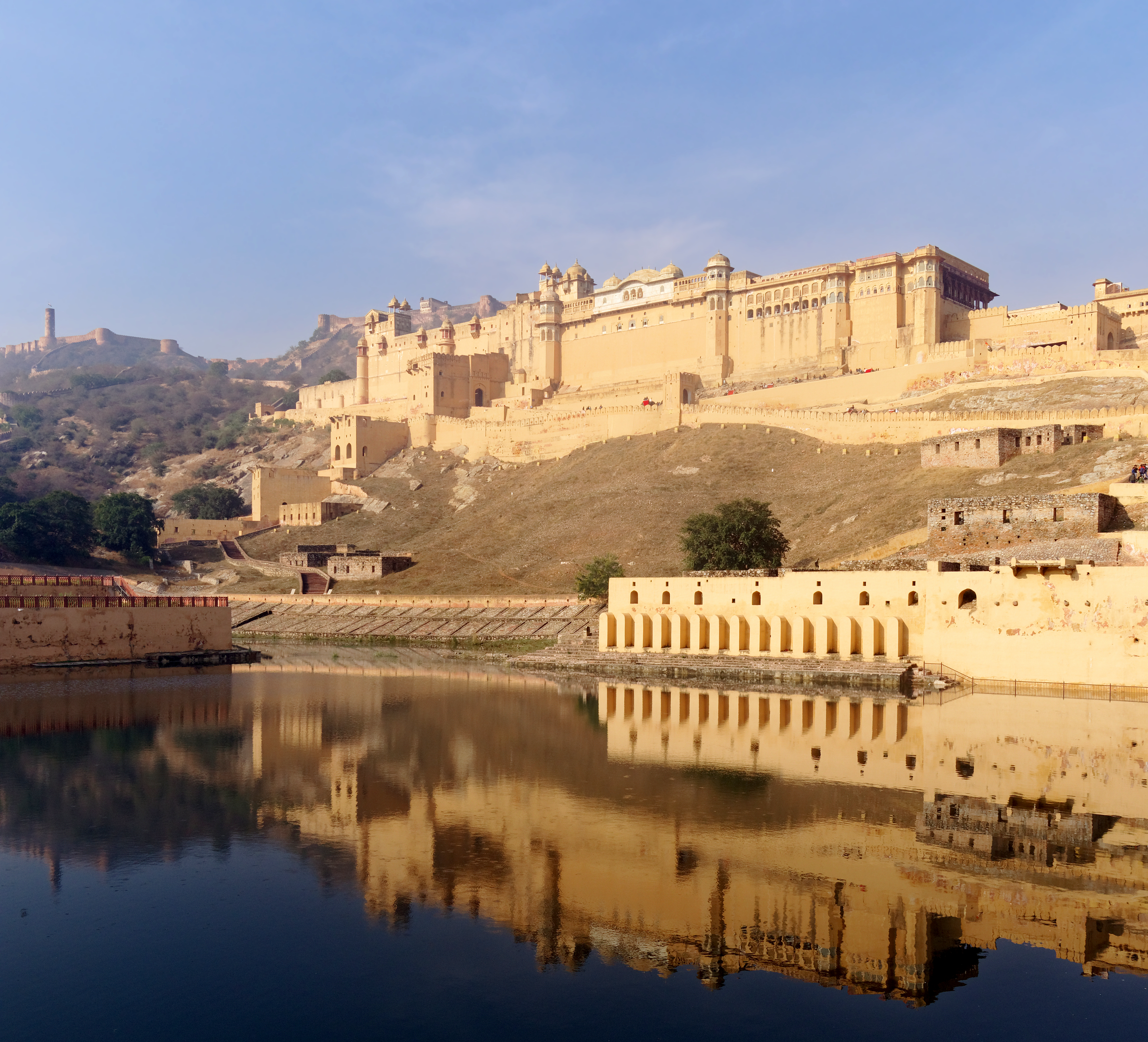
Amber Fort as seen from the bank of Maotha Lake, Jaigarh Fort on the hills in the background

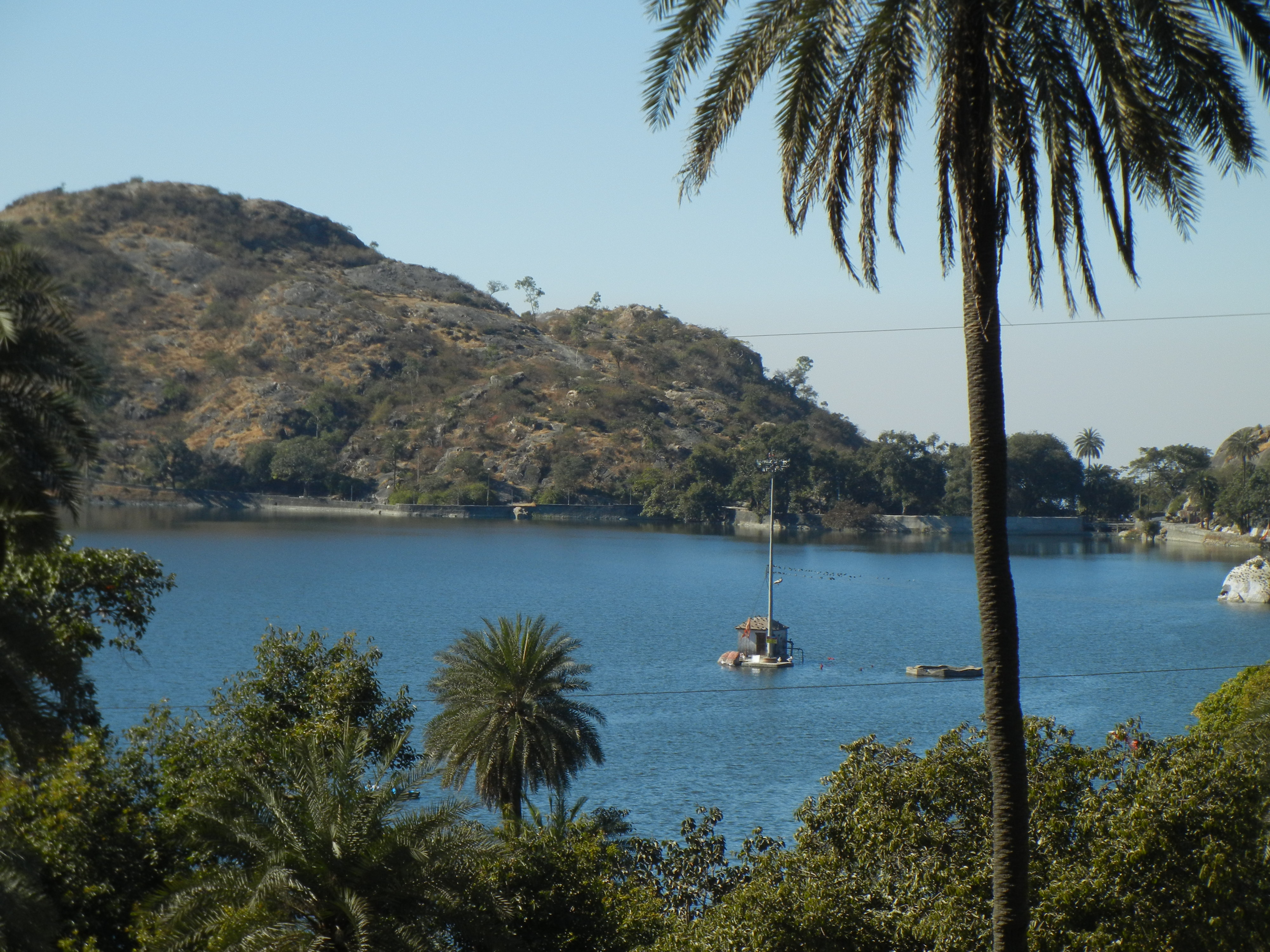
Nakki Lake, Mount Abu

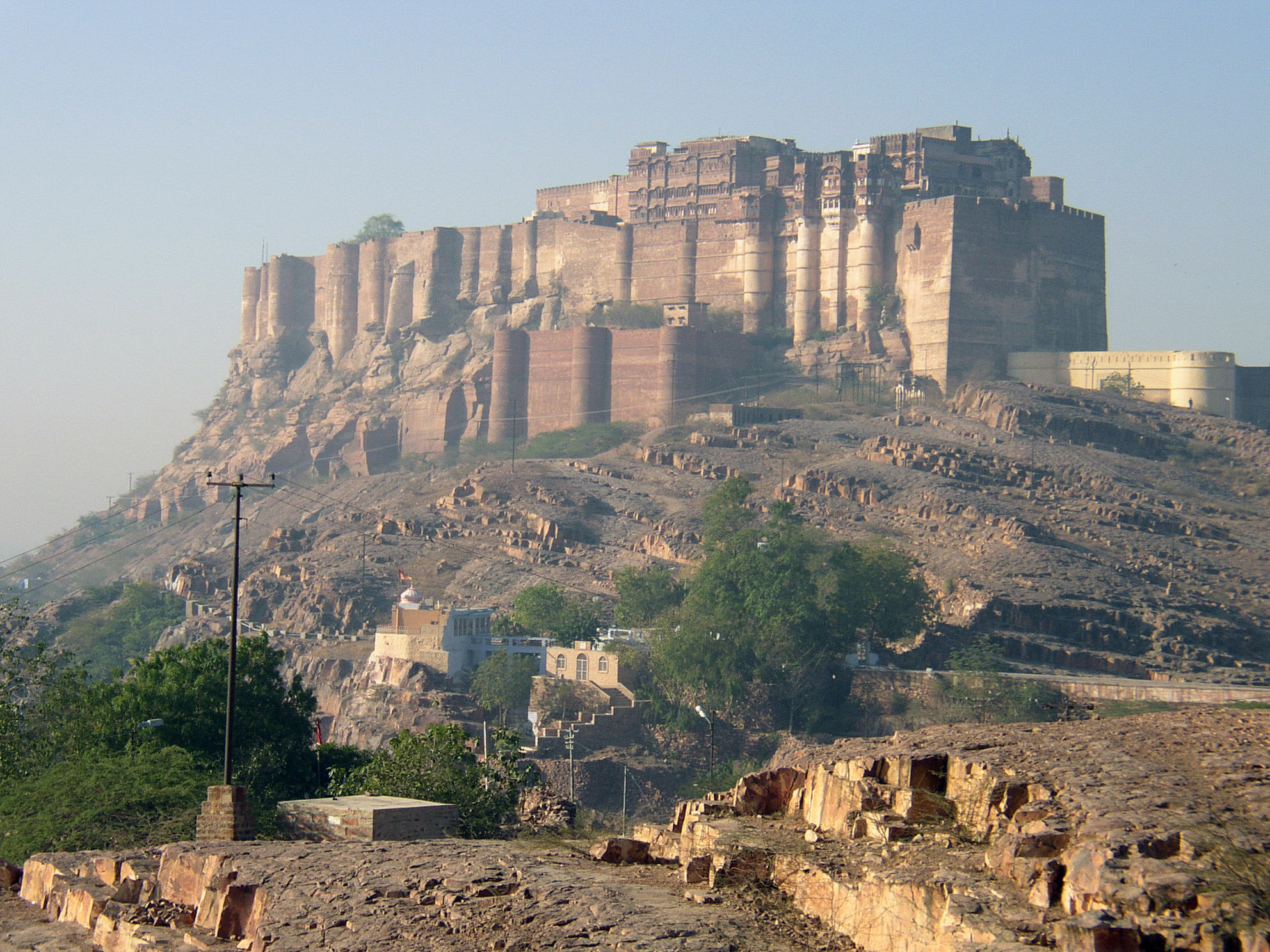
Mehrangarh Fort

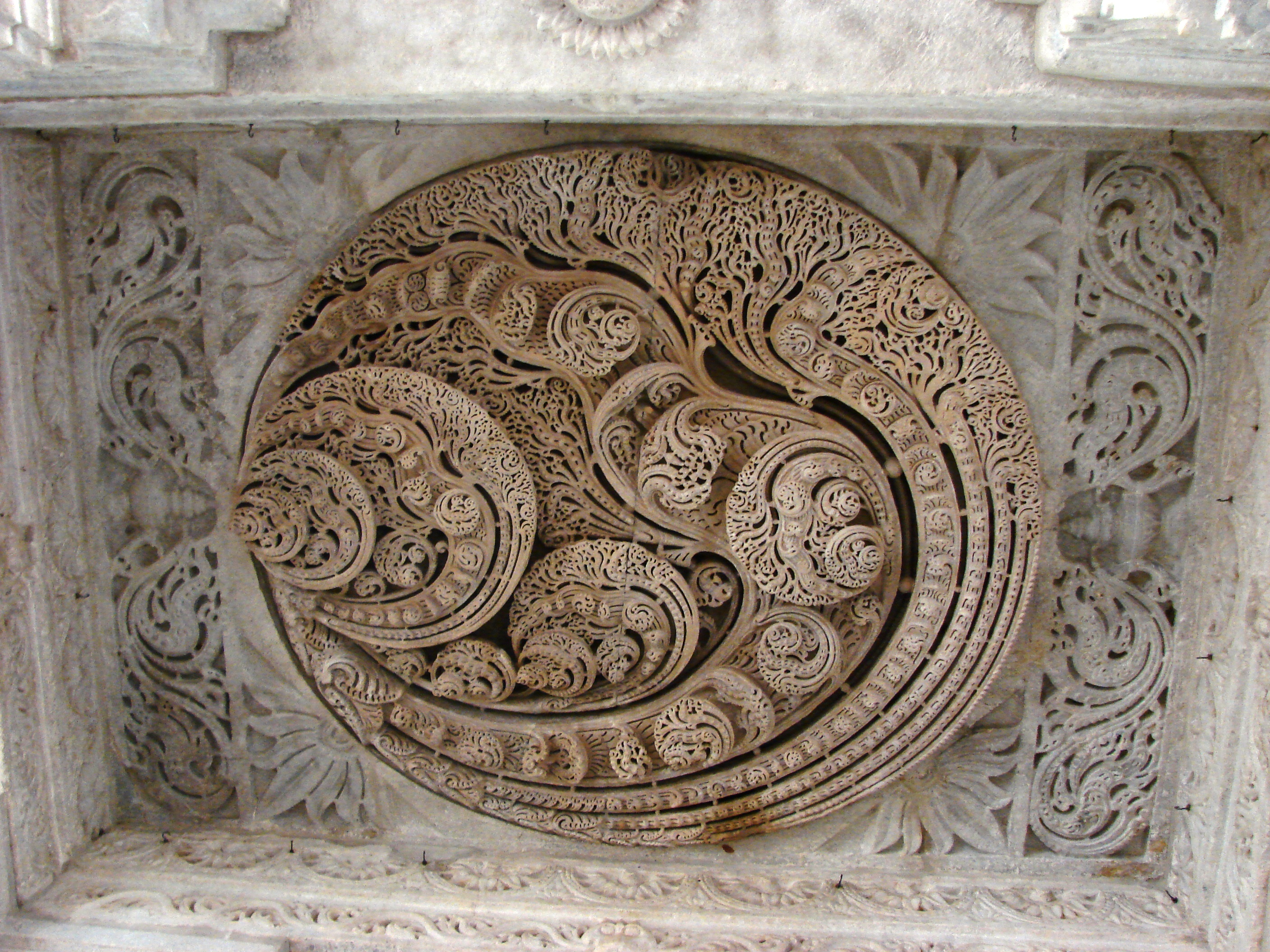
Delicate marble carving at Dilwara Temples

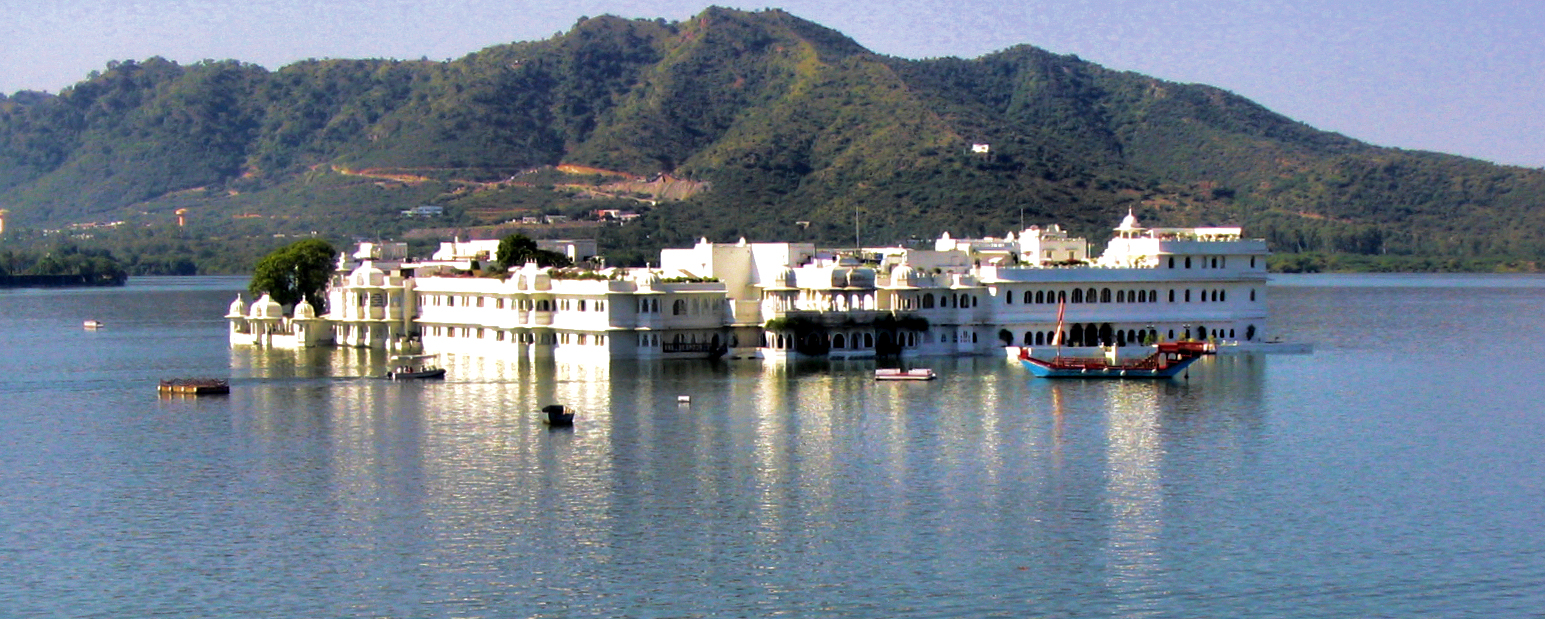
Lake Palace, Udaipur

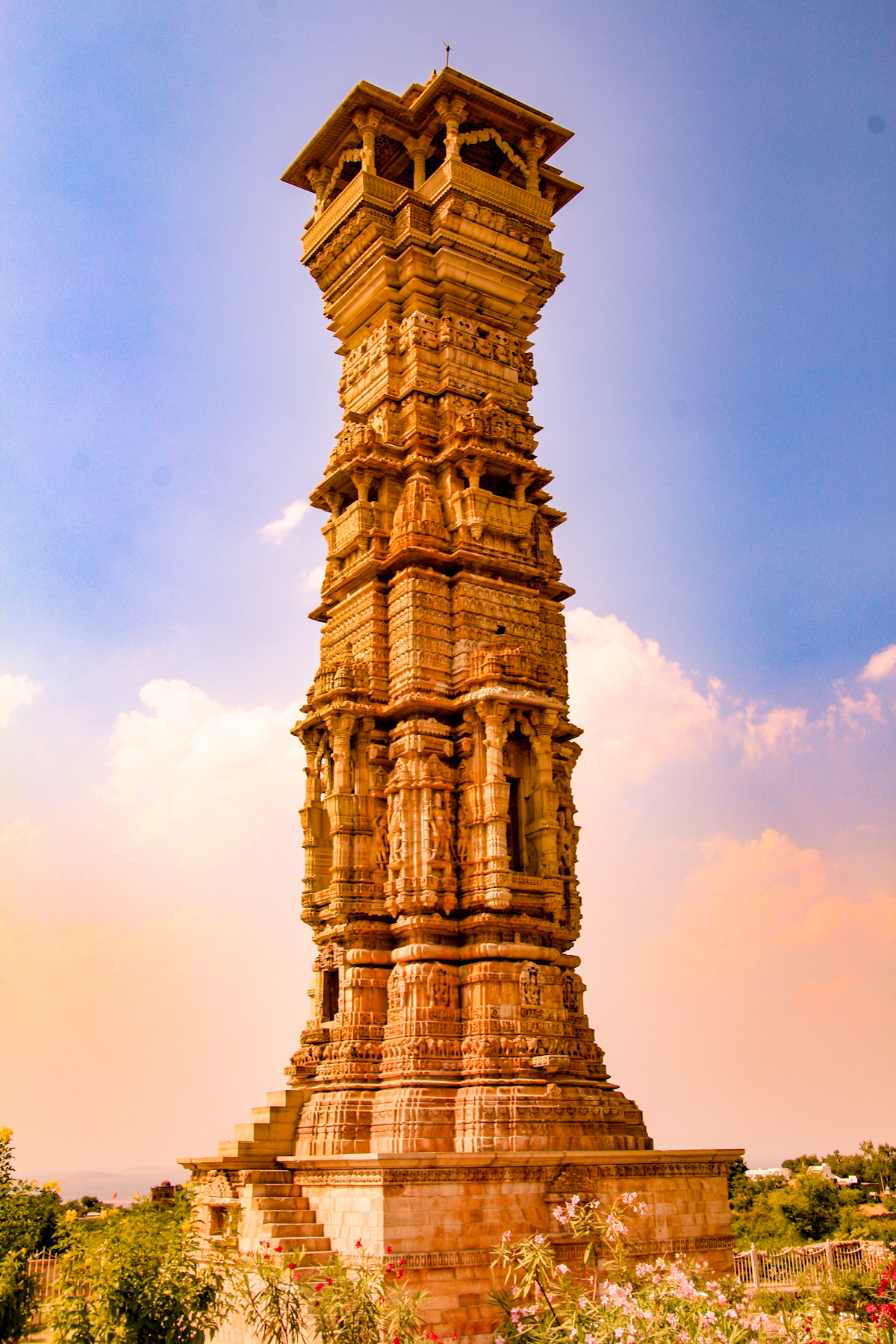
Kirti Stambha of Chittor Fort

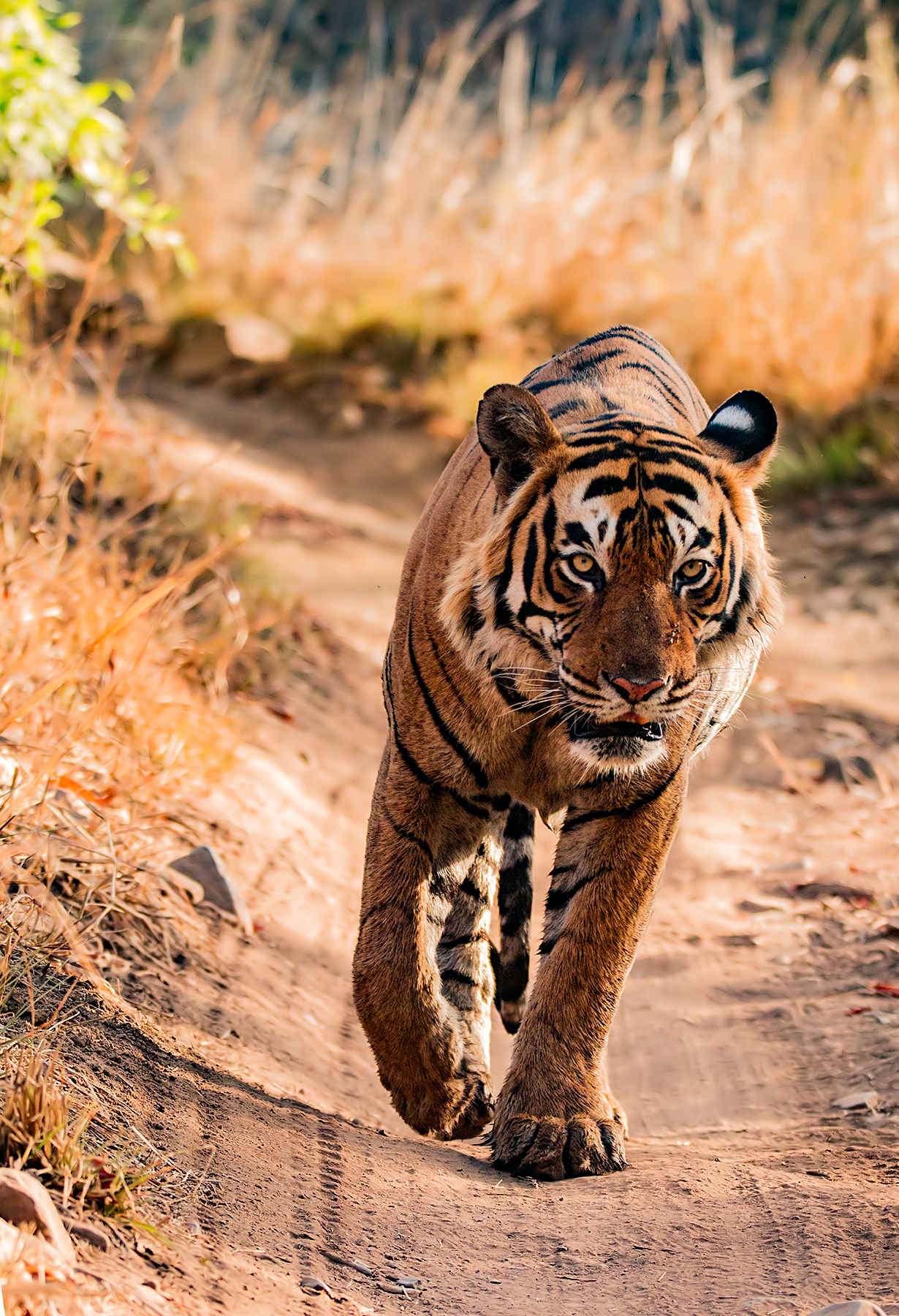
Tiger at Ranthambore National Park

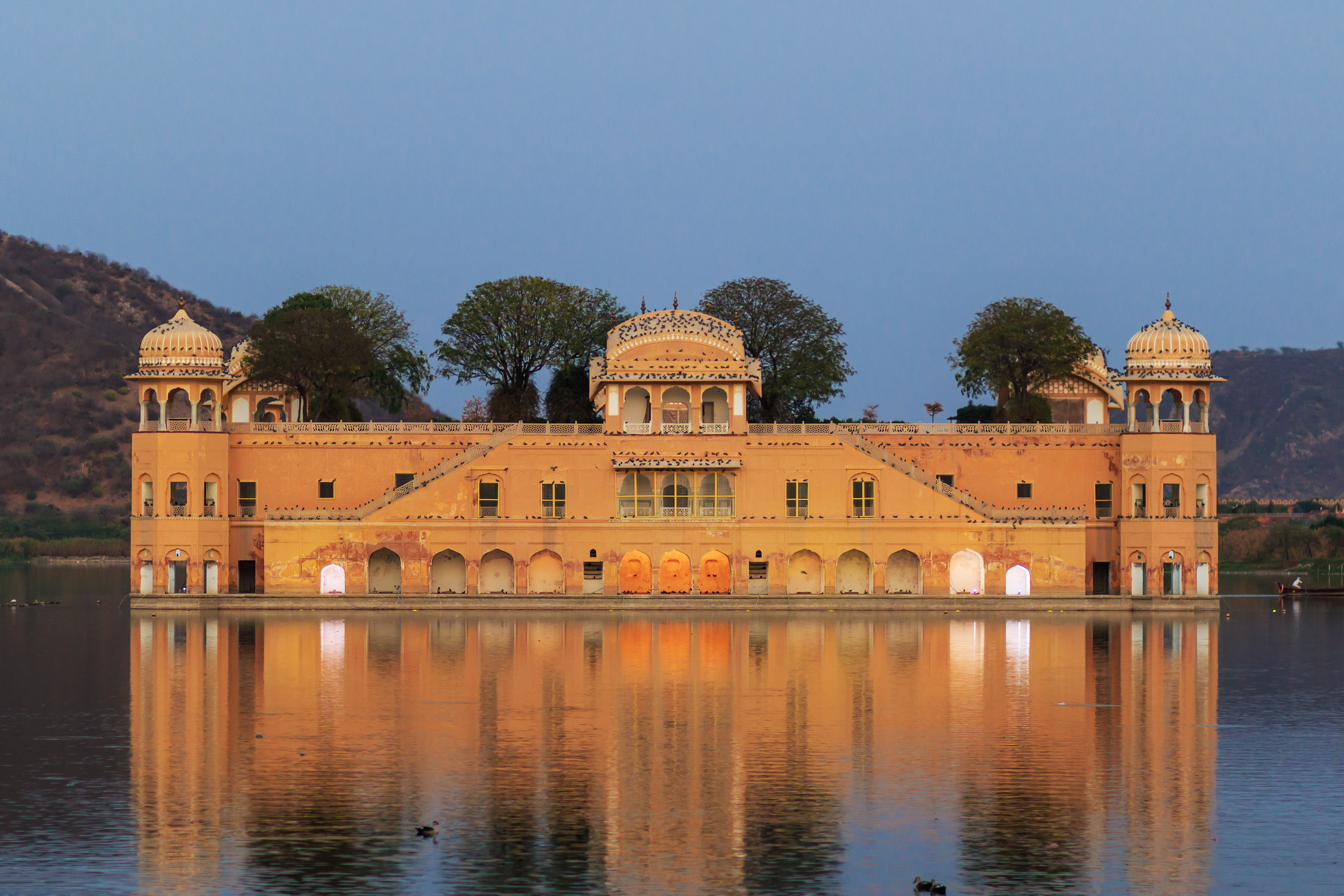
Jal Mahal, Jaipur

== See also ==
- Outline of Rajasthan
