= Brahma Kumaris International Headquarters =

Headquarters complex of the Brahma Kumaris in Rajasthan, India

Brahma Kumaris international headquarters
- प्रजापिता ब्रह्माकुमारी ईश्वरीय विश्व विद्यालय
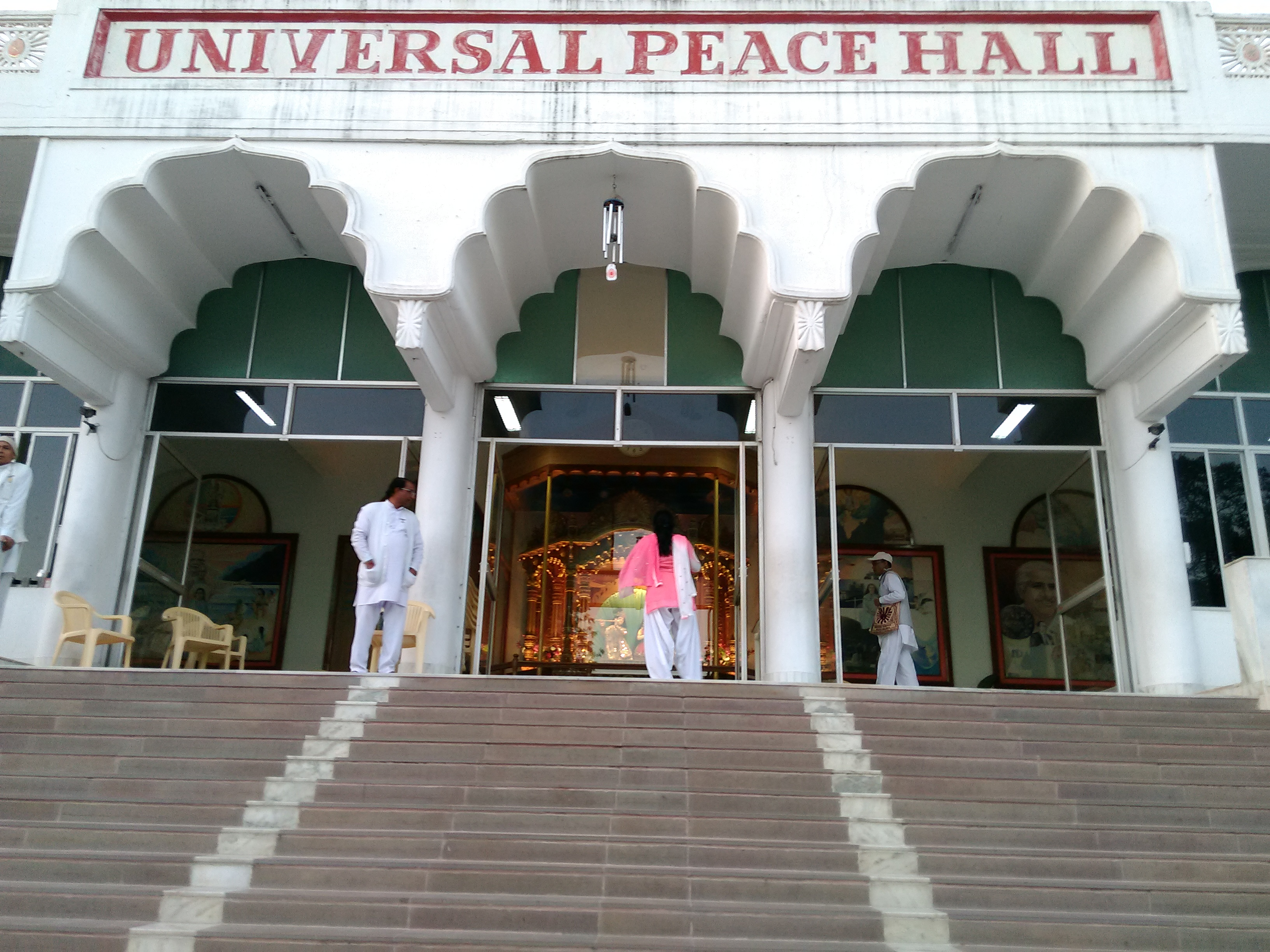
- The Brahma Kumaris headquarters at Mount Abu

Religion
- Affiliation: Brahma Kumaris
- Ownership: Prajapita Brahma Kumaris Ishwariya Vishwa Vidyalaya
- Governing body: World Renewal Spiritual Trust
- Leadership: Mohini Didi (BK Mohini Panjabi), chief administrator (2025-present)
- Status: Active

Location
- Location: Mount Abu and Abu Road, Sirohi district, Rajasthan
- Country: India
- Interactive map of Brahma Kumaris international headquarters
- Coordinates: 24.5925°N 72.7083°E

Architecture
- Founder: Brahma Baba
- Established: 1950 (relocation to Mount Abu)
- Completed: 1950 (Pandav Bhawan); 1991 (J. Watumull Global Hospital); 1995 (Gyan Sarovar); 1996 (Shantivan); 2017 (India One)
- Capacity: 20,000-25,000 (Diamond Hall)

Website
- www.brahmakumaris.com/headquarters/

The Brahma Kumaris international headquarters or Brahma Kumaris world headquarters, collectively known as Madhuban (Hindi: मधुबन, "forest of honey"), is the headquarters complex of the Brahma Kumaris (officially the Prajapita Brahma Kumaris Ishwariya Vishwa Vidyalaya), spread across Mount Abu and Abu Road in Sirohi district, Rajasthan, India. The complex consists of several campuses, the largest of which are Pandav Bhawan (the original 1950 site, on Mount Abu), Gyan Sarovar (1995, also on Mount Abu) and Shantivan (1996, at Abu Road), together with the J. Watumull Global Hospital and Research Centre at Talheti and the 1 MW India One solar thermal power plant commissioned at Shantivan in early 2017. Among the complex's notable facilities are the Diamond Hall at Shantivan, which the organisation reports can seat 20,000 - 25,000 people, and a Scheffler-reflector solar kitchen that, together with the adjacent India One plant, prepares about 50,000 meals daily.

The Brahma Kumaris movement, founded in 1936 in Hyderabad, Sindh, moved its headquarters from Karachi to Mount Abu in 1950 and has been based there since. Successive expansions in the 1990s, undertaken during the administration of Dadi Prakashmani, added Gyan Sarovar and Shantivan to accommodate the movement's growth, while the J. Watumull Global Hospital opened in 1991. Executive administration of the institution has been held by women since its founding: Om Radhe served as the first administrative head from 1937 until her death in 1965, while the founder Brahma Baba himself held no executive office, and after his death in 1969 the role passed through a succession of senior women, most recently Mohini Didi from 2025.

The complex hosts the movement's annual gatherings, training courses and international conferences. The Brahma Kumaris reported in 2021 that the headquarters administered a global network of more than 8,000 centres in over 110 countries, with more than one million students. Indian prime minister Narendra Modi inaugurated the Brahma Kumaris' 80th-anniversary celebrations at Shantivan in March 2017 by video link from Delhi, and visited Shantivan in person in May 2023 to lay the foundation stone for the second phase of the Watumull hospital. Reporting by Indian and international media has focused in particular on the India One plant, described by India's Ministry of New and Renewable Energy (MNRE) as the largest concentrated-solar-thermal facility of its type in the country.

== History ==
=== Founding and relocation (1936-1950) ===
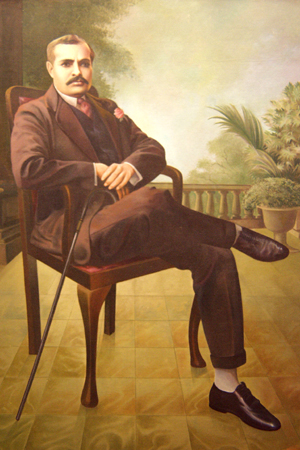
Brahma Baba, founder of the Brahma Kumaris

The Brahma Kumaris were established in 1936 in Hyderabad, Sindh, by Brahma Baba and operated as the Om Mandali satsang group before relocating to Karachi in 1938 amid local opposition. In October 1937 the founder transferred his personal fortune to a managing committee of eight women and named the then 22-year-old Om Radhe as its president; she served as the institution's first administrative head until her death in 1965, while Brahma Baba himself held no executive office. Following the partition of India, around three hundred members of the movement moved in 1950 to the hill station of Mount Abu in Rajasthan, taking the lease of a property on Sunset Road that became known as Pandav Bhawan. Pandav Bhawan has been the movement's spiritual headquarters since, and a more structured seven-lesson public introduction to Raja Yoga meditation was developed there from 1952 onwards.

=== Expansion (1969-2007) ===
Brahma Baba died at Pandav Bhawan on 18 January 1969; after his death, executive responsibility settled on Dadi Prakashmani, who served as chief administrator until 2007. During this period the movement was registered with the United Nations Department of Public Information as an NGO (1980) and granted UN ECOSOC general consultative status (1983), and Dadi Prakashmani was named a United Nations Peace Messenger in 1987 following the Brahma Kumaris' "Million Minutes of Peace" appeal for the UN International Year of Peace in 1986. The headquarters expanded substantially in the same period: the J. Watumull Global Hospital and Research Centre opened at Mount Abu in 1991; the Gyan Sarovar academic campus was added on Mount Abu in 1995; and the much larger Shantivan campus, in the foothills near Abu Road, was inaugurated in 1996 to mark the movement's Diamond Jubilee. A Scheffler-reflector solar kitchen at Shantivan was developed with the inventor Wolfgang Scheffler in the late 1990s, and a Sustainable Yogic Agriculture programme was begun in cooperation with Indian agricultural universities.

=== 21st-century development ===
Following Prakashmani's death in 2007, the chief administrator's role passed to Dadi Janki (2007-2020), then to Dadi Hirdaya Mohini ("Dadi Gulzar") in 2020-2021, to Dadi Ratan Mohini from 2021 until her death in April 2025, and then to Mohini Didi (BK Mohini Panjabi), the institution's sixth administrative head. A 1 MW concentrated solar thermal power plant, India One, was commissioned at Shantivan in early 2017 after about five years of construction. Indian prime minister Narendra Modi opened the Brahma Kumaris' 80th-anniversary international conference at Shantivan in March 2017 by video link, and visited the campus in person in May 2023 to lay the foundation stone for the second phase of the Watumull hospital on an adjacent 50-acre site.

== Administrative heads ==
The institution was founded by Brahma Baba, who held no executive office; from October 1937 its day-to-day administration was vested in a managing committee of women. The headquarters has accordingly been administered by women since its founding, an arrangement that anthropologists have noted as unusual in the patriarchal Sindhi milieu in which the Brahma Kumaris originated.

Administrative heads of the Brahma Kumaris international headquarters
| # | Portrait | Name | Tenure | Notes |
|---|---|---|---|---|
| 1 | Om Radhe | Om Radhe (Mateshwari, "Mamma") | 1937-1965 | First administrative head; led the institution through the 1938-1939 Sind court proceedings and the 1950 move to Mount Abu |
| 2 | Dadi Prakashmani | Dadi Prakashmani | 1969-2007 | Took charge after the founder's death in 1969; oversaw the 1990s campus expansions; named a United Nations Peace Messenger in 1987 |
| 3 | Dadi Janki | Dadi Janki | 2007-2020 | Long-serving Director of Brahma Kumaris Europe before her appointment; died in 2020 aged 104 |
| 4 | Dadi Hirdaya Mohini | Dadi Hirdaya Mohini ("Dadi Gulzar") | 2020-2021 | Died on 11 March 2021; farewell rites held at Shantivan |
| 5 | Dadi Ratan Mohini | Dadi Ratan Mohini | 2021-2025 | Appointed in March 2021 aged 96; died in April 2025 aged 100 |
| 6 | | BK Mohini | 2025–present | First "Didi" (rather than "Dadi") to lead the institution |

== Administration and outreach ==
The headquarters complex serves as the administrative centre for the Brahma Kumaris' international activities. Outreach work is coordinated through the Rajyoga Education and Research Foundation (RE&RF), a society registered under the Societies Registration Act in 1982 and based at the Mount Abu headquarters; the Foundation directs the movement's service work through about twenty profession-specific wings - covering sectors such as education, medicine, business, law, media, science and engineering, agriculture and rural development, women and youth — each running training programmes, conferences and retreats for its sector.

Major outreach programmes administered from the Mount Abu headquarters in cooperation with the United Nations include the 1986 "Million Minutes of Peace" appeal during the International Year of Peace, the 1988 "Global Cooperation for a Better World" project, and the movement's ongoing UN ECOSOC consultative work.

== Campuses ==
The headquarters infrastructure is divided between two locations about 18 km (11 mi) apart. The hill town of Mount Abu holds the movement's original and historically significant sites - Pandav Bhawan, Gyan Sarovar academy, the spiritual museum and Peace Park, while the larger campuses developed on the plains at Abu Road (Talheti), led by Shantivan, provide the residential and congregational capacity for mass gatherings.

Principal campuses of the Brahma Kumaris international headquarters
| Campus | Location | Primary role | Reported residential capacity | Notable structures |
|---|---|---|---|---|
| Pandav Bhawan | Mount Abu | Original headquarters; historical nucleus | c. 350 - 500 | Universal Peace Hall, Baba's Hut, Baba's Room, Shanti Stambh, History Hall |
| Gyan Sarovar | Mount Abu | Academy and research campus | c. 1,500 | Universal Harmony Hall, Spiritual Art Gallery, SpARC |
| Shantivan | Abu Road | Mass congregation; administration | c. 15,000 - 20,000 | Diamond Hall, Conference Hall, memorial stambhs |
| Mansarovar | Abu Road | Seminar and retreat campus | c. 2,500 | 500-seat auditorium |
| Manmohinivan | Abu Road | Residential and media campus | c. 2,000 | Godlywood Studio, Global Auditorium |
| Anand Sarovar | Abu Road | Professional-retreat campus | c. 1,000 | Programme grounds, Dadi Gulzar Park |

=== Mount Abu ===
==== Brij Kothi ====
Brahma Kumaris accounts identify a leased former royal residence known as Brij Kothi as the community's first base in Mount Abu in the early 1950s, used during the transition from Karachi before Pandav Bhawan became the established headquarters.

==== Pandav Bhawan ====
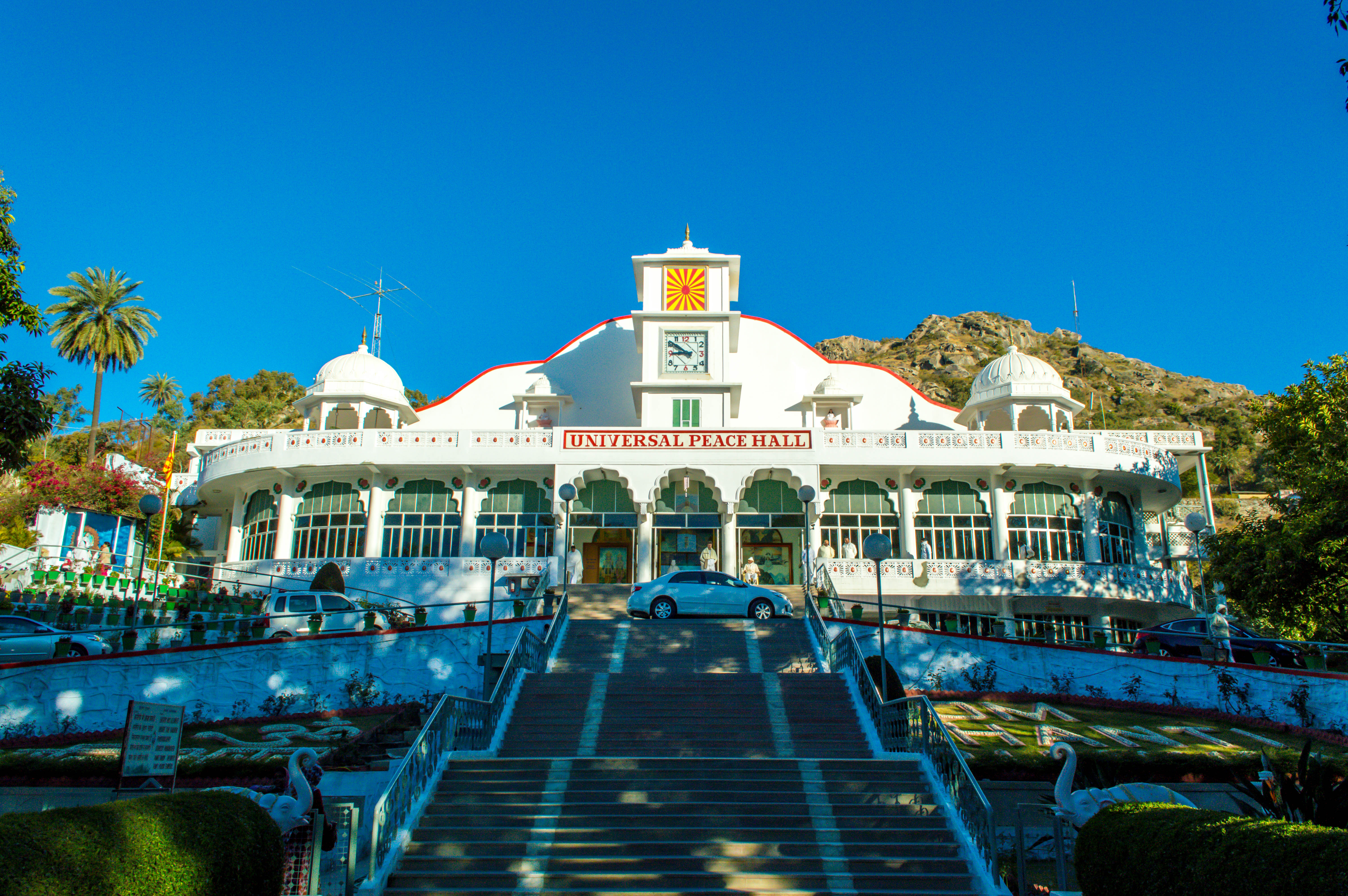
The Universal Peace Hall (Om Shanti Bhawan) at Pandav Bhawan, Mount Abu

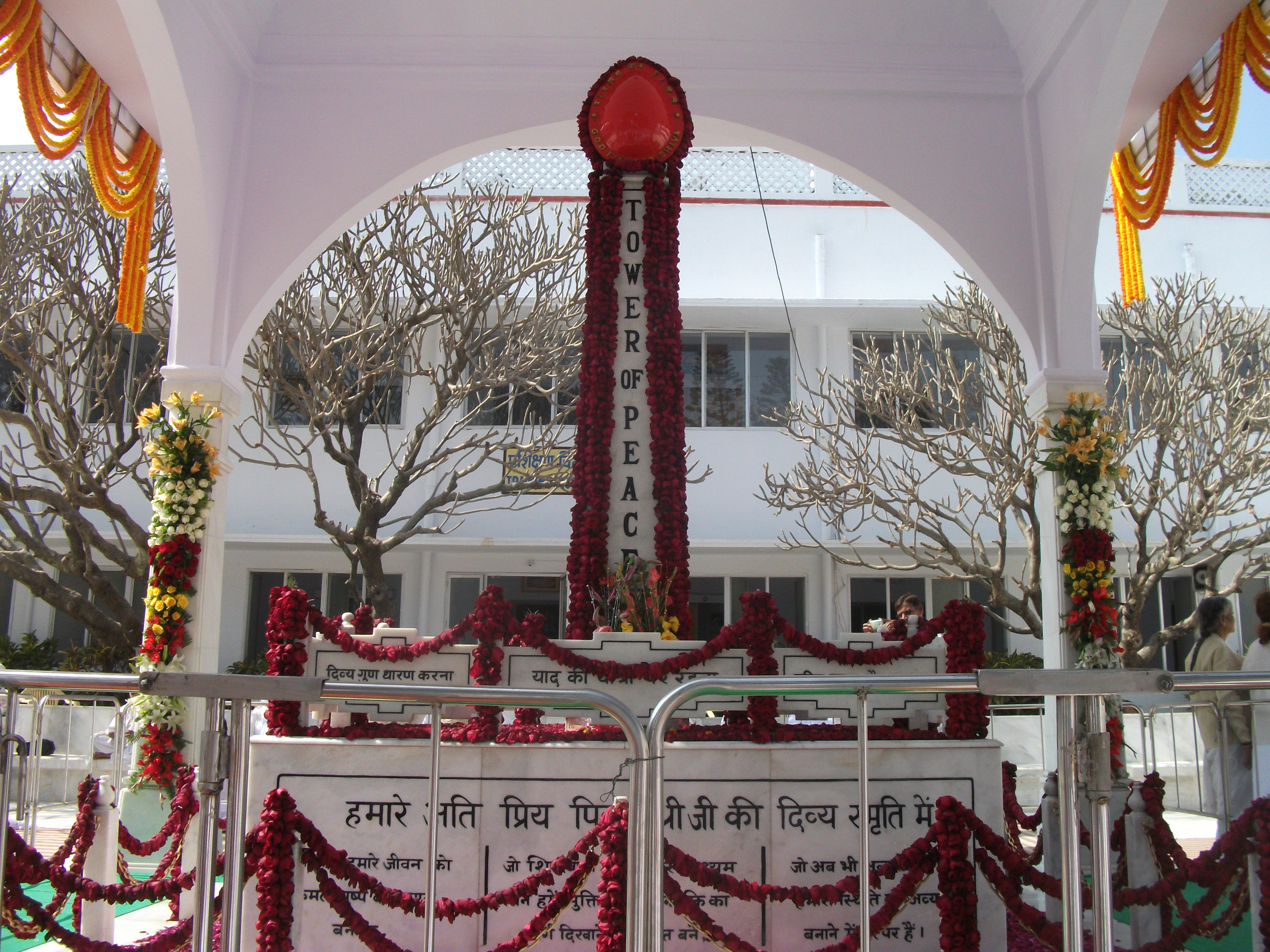
The Shanti Stambh (Tower of Peace) at Pandav Bhawan, raised as a memorial to the founder Brahma Baba

Pandav Bhawan is the original 1950 headquarters of the Brahma Kumaris and the seat of the movement's senior administration. Over the decades it has developed into a complex of dormitories, residential units, meditation venues, dining facilities and administrative offices; the organisation reports a permanent residential population of several hundred and the hosting of tens of thousands of guests each year, with a communal kitchen able to serve several thousand people at a sitting.

The campus contains a cluster of sites associated with the founder that the organisation groups as a pilgrimage circuit (Char Dham): Baba's Hut (jhopri), a simple hermitage used by Brahma Baba for meditation; Baba's Room, his preserved personal quarters; the History Hall, where early murli discourses were delivered; and the Shanti Stambh (Tower of Peace), a white marble memorial raised on the site where the founder's remains were placed after his death on 18 January 1969. The campus's principal assembly building is the Universal Peace Hall (Om Shanti Bhawan), a pillar-less auditorium built in 1983 that the organisation reports as seating between 3,000 and 5,000 people, with simultaneous translation in 16 languages; open to the public, it is used for daily morning classes and conferences and is a Mount Abu tourist attraction.

==== Gyan Sarovar ====
Gyan Sarovar (ज्ञान सरोवर, "lake of knowledge"), formally the Academy for a Better World, is an academic, research and conference campus developed in the 1990s approximately 4 km (2.5 mi) from Pandav Bhawan. Laid out as a self-contained village on a site variously reported at 28 to 35 acres (11 to 14 ha), it was designed to limit building to a small share of the land and retain the surrounding natural topography, and in 1996 was recognised as a Best Practice initiative at the United Nations Habitat II conference on human settlements in Istanbul. Its facilities include the Universal Harmony Hall, a tiered auditorium seating about 1,600-1,800 with translation booths for 16 languages; an International Centre for Higher Learning with thirteen seminar rooms; a Spiritual Art Gallery presenting the movement's cyclic cosmology of four yugas through audio-visual, laser and multimedia displays alongside a section on traditional Rajasthani life; Golden Meditation Dome; and the Spiritual Application Research Centre (SpARC), established in 1995 to study applications of Raja Yoga meditation. The academy accommodates around 1,500 residents across several named blocks, with dining facilities for some 1,200 people, and operates solar water-heating, solar steam cooking and greywater recycling systems; an adjoining landscaped park commemorates Dadi Janki.

==== World Renewal Spiritual Museum ====
The World Renewal Spiritual Museum stands in the centre of Mount Abu near Nakki Lake and presents the Brahma Kumaris' cosmology including its cycle of four yugas and the doctrine of karma through statues, transparencies and a free laser presentation, together with a room used for introductory Raja Yoga instruction.

==== Peace Park ====
Peace Park is a landscaped recreational park run by the Brahma Kumaris about 8 km (5.0 mi) from the Pandav Bhawan, between the Aravalli peaks of Guru Shikhar and Achalgarh. Maintained largely by volunteers, it combines a rock garden, orchard, citrus area and rose garden with nature walks, audio-visual presentations and meditation enclosures including a grass hut, a stone cave and a bamboo meditation hut.

=== Abu Road ===
==== Shantivan ====
Shantivan (शान्तिवन, "forest of peace") is the largest campus of the complex, located on the Abu Road - Mount Abu state highway in Sirohi district about 6 km (3.7 mi) from Abu Road railway station and 18 km (11 mi) from Mount Abu. It was inaugurated in 1996 to mark the 60th anniversary (Diamond Jubilee) of the Brahma Kumaris and developed as the principal venue for residential gatherings; the organisation reports that it can house in the order of 15,000 - 20,000 guests at a time, functioning as a largely self-contained settlement.

The campus's central structure is the Diamond Hall, a pillar-less auditorium built for the Diamond Jubilee that the organisation reports can seat between 20,000 and 25,000 people, with simultaneous translation in several languages; the column-free design gives an unobstructed view of the stage during mass meditation programmes, and capacity is increased for major events by removing seating. Other facilities include a Conference Hall seating around 1,200 with translation in 16 languages, smaller halls each seating about 350, meditation halls, spiritual museums, and extensive residential and dining blocks. The Gyanamrit Bhawan houses the movement's printing press, which produces its periodicals Gyanamrit and The World Renewal.

Shantivan serves as the memorial site for several of the movement's senior women leaders: the octagonal Tower of Light (Prakash Stambh), raised for Dadi Prakashmani, who died on 25 August 2007 after leading the institution for some 38 years; the Shakti Stambh, dedicated to Dadi Janki (died 2020); and the Avyakt Lok, dedicated to Dadi Hirdaya Mohini ("Dadi Gulzar", died 2021). A lotus-shaped meditation building, the Tapasya Dham, and an adjacent Om Museum of organisational history and artefacts are also on the campus.

Shantivan operates a large solar-powered communal kitchen, designed in the late 1990s with the inventor Wolfgang Scheffler and the movement's renewable energy department, that uses 84 Scheffler parabolic concentrators to generate steam directly for cooking. The kitchen, supplemented after 2017 by steam from the adjacent India One plant, is reported to prepare around 50,000 meals daily for guests at the campus, saving over 100,000 litres of diesel a year.

==== Mansarovar ====
Mansarovar is a retreat and seminar campus at Kivarli on the banks of the Banas, about 5 km (3.1 mi) from Shantivan, developed for conferences and meditation retreats away from the main campus and reported to accommodate up to 2,500 residents, with a 500 seat auditorium and water-recycling, rainwater harvesting, biogas and solar facilities. During the second wave of the COVID-19 pandemic in 2021, the Brahma Kumaris made the Mansarovar campus available to the Sirohi district administration as a COVID-19 treatment and isolation centre with several hundred beds.

==== Manmohinivan ====
Manmohinivan (मनमोहिनीवन), about 1.5 km (0.93 mi) from Shantivan, is a residential and media campus accommodating around 2,000 people, with its own transport department, dining facilities and a shuttle link to Shantivan. It houses the Godlywood Studio, the movement's audio-visual and broadcast production centre, together with a 500-seat Global Auditorium used for media events and Raja Yoga camps.

==== Anand Sarovar ====
Anand Sarovar is a residential and retreat campus accommodating over 1,000 participants, with open programme grounds, meditation rooms and recreational facilities and an associated Dadi Gulzar Park. It is frequently used for professional conventions, including national gatherings for finance professionals organised by the movement's Business and Industry wing.

==== Prakashmani Wisdom Park ====
The Prakashmani Wisdom Park is a 5.5-acre (2.2 ha) multimedia attraction about 500 m (1,600 ft) from Shantivan, inaugurated on Maha Shivaratri in February 2025 by the Speaker of the Lok Sabha, Om Birla. Its attractions include an open-air water-screen laser show (Navsrijan), a domed projection theatre billed as a "Meditorium", a "Rajyoga Thought Lab" and 3D-projection meditation rooms.

== India One Solar Thermal Power Plant ==
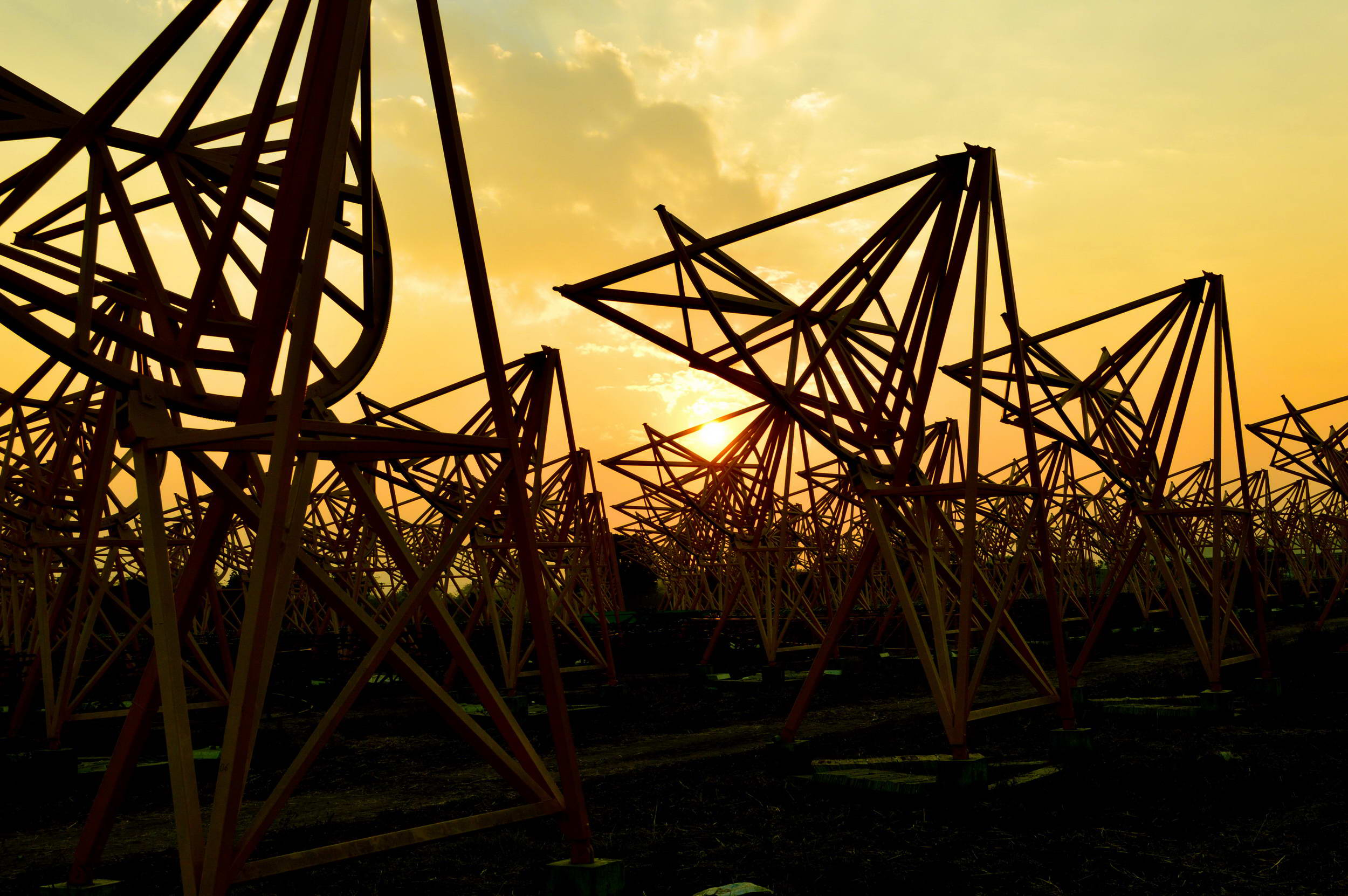
A field of parabolic dish reflectors at the India One Solar Thermal Power Plant, Shantivan

The India One Solar Thermal Power Plant is a 1 MW concentrated solar thermal facility located within the Shantivan campus, commissioned in early 2017 by the World Renewal Spiritual Trust (the renewable-energy unit of the Brahma Kumaris). India's Ministry of New and Renewable Energy has described it as the largest plant of its type in India.

The plant is spread over approximately 25 acres (10 ha) and uses 770 specially designed parabolic dish reflectors, each of about 60 m^{2} (650 sq ft), that track the sun and concentrate sunlight onto fixed-focus thermal receivers, generating steam directly for cooking and electricity. An integrated thermal storage system using cast iron heat-storage allows the plant to operate after sunset. ThePrint reported in 2025 that the plant generates approximately 16,000 kWh of electricity per day, of which about half is consumed on the Brahma Kumaris campus and the remainder exported to the grid.

The project was funded jointly by India's Ministry of New and Renewable Energy and the German Federal Ministry for the Environment, Nature Conservation, Building and Nuclear Safety, the latter through GIZ; about 90 per cent of the plant's components were designed and manufactured in India by the Brahma Kumaris' engineering team, with imported items limited to the German turbine generator and US-supplied solar-grade mirrors. Total reported investment in the project was approximately ₹80 crore. The plant supplies cooking steam to Shantivan's solar kitchen and exports surplus electricity to the grid; the project's head Golo Pilz and CEO Jayasimha Rathod have stated that the plant is intended as a replicable model for decentralised solar thermal generation in India.

== Healthcare ==
=== J. Watumull Global Hospital and Research Centre ===
The J. Watumull Global Hospital and Research Centre, located at Mount Abu in Sirohi district, opened in 1991 as a charitable multi-specialty hospital affiliated with the Brahma Kumaris. It was founded jointly by the Brahma Kumaris, the cardiac surgeon Ashok Mehta and the Watumull family philanthropists Gulab and Khubchand Watumull, and is named for the family's J. Watumull. The hospital combines modern allopathic medicine with complementary therapies and operates on a policy of not turning away patients unable to pay; the organisation reports that it examines around 100,000 outpatients a year and provides free or subsidised treatment to tens of thousands of tribal residents across hundreds of villages in the district. Its community-outreach work includes a mobile health clinic serving outlying villages, a tuberculosis-control project, free cleft-lip and cleft-palate surgery for children, and a school-nutrition programme. In May 2023, prime minister Narendra Modi laid the foundation stone for the second phase of the hospital, including a senior-citizens' home and an extension of the nursing college, on an adjacent 50-acre (20 ha) plot during a visit to Shantivan.

=== Global Hospital and Trauma Centre ===
On the plains at Abu Road the medical trust operates several specialised units, including a trauma and emergency centre, an eye-care centre that conducts cataract-surgery and blindness-prevention camps, a regional blood bank, and a rural family-health clinic.

=== Nursing education ===
The trust runs two nursing institutions at Abu Road: the Global Hospital School of Nursing, established in 2006 and offering a three-year diploma in general nursing and midwifery, and the Saroj Lalji Mehrotra Global Nursing College, established in 2011 and offering a four-year Bachelor of Science in Nursing affiliated with the Rajasthan University of Health Sciences.

== Sustainability initiatives ==
The headquarters complex has been the site of several large-scale sustainability programmes run by the Brahma Kumaris, in renewable energy and in agriculture.

=== Solar energy ===
The Brahma Kumaris' principal renewable-energy installations are co-located at Shantivan. The 84-dish Scheffler-reflector solar kitchen, developed in the late 1990s in collaboration with the German engineer Wolfgang Scheffler and the movement's renewable-energy department, prepares around 50,000 meals daily and is reported to save over 100,000 litres of diesel a year. The 1 MW India One concentrated solar thermal plant, commissioned in 2017, generates about 16,000 kWh of electricity per day and additionally supplies steam to the campus's communal kitchen. Both installations have been covered as case studies of decentralised solar-thermal generation in the Indian and international press.

=== Sustainable Yogic Agriculture ===
The Brahma Kumaris began the Sustainable Yogic Agriculture (SYA) programme in 2009 as a collaboration between the movement's Agriculture and Rural Development Wing, based at the headquarters, and the Sardarkrushinagar Dantiwada Agricultural University in Gujarat. The programme conducts field trials on the yields of crops grown using meditation-based interventions alongside organic methods, with reported effects on seed germination rates, microbial activity in soil and overall crop performance documented in peer-reviewed reports. In December 2015 the SYA was relaunched on a national scale as the Akhil Bharatiya Krushak Sashakatikaran Abhiyan (ABKSA), with public support from the Government of India announced by Agriculture Minister Radha Mohan Singh at a Brahma Kumaris event; the relaunched programme combines farmer self-empowerment training, meditation-based farming research and education on organic methods. The programme is administered from the Mount Abu and Abu Road headquarters and operates demonstration plots and training programmes at the Gyan Sarovar and Shantivan campuses.

=== Agricultural and ecological sites ===
The movement's Agriculture and Rural Development wing operates several farm and ecological sites around Abu Road as demonstration projects for its yogic-farming methods. Tapovan is an organic-farming retreat in the Aravalli foothills, reported at about 70 acres (28 ha), with orchards of almond, date, cashew, mango and guava, an acupressure path, a green meditation hall and designated "silence zones"; it also contains a rose garden described by the organisation as a World Peace Rose Garden. Dadi Gulzar Upvan, reported at about 100 acres (40 ha), is a larger organic farm used for demonstrations and for tree-planting drives under the movement's environmental campaigns. Arogyavan is a wasteland-reclamation project where the wing reports having restored a degraded tract through rainwater harvesting, green-manure cycles and the planting of native tree species, and conducted chemical-free rice trials. A model cow shelter, the Adarsh Goushala, housing some 70 cattle, is also run by the wing at Abu Road.

== Notable events ==
The complex is the venue for the Brahma Kumaris' annual Bhatti retreats, training programmes and international conferences, which the organisation reports as drawing tens of thousands of participants from over 100 countries each year. It also receives delegations of foreign dignitaries in connection with the Brahma Kumaris' UN-accredited NGO activities and its 1983 ECOSOC consultative status.

Selected notable events at the Brahma Kumaris world headquarters
| Year | Event | Source |
|---|---|---|
| 1950 | The Brahma Kumaris movement relocates from Karachi to a leased property on Sunset Road, Mount Abu, that becomes Pandav Bhawan. | |
| 1969 | Death of the movement's founder Brahma Baba at Pandav Bhawan on 18 January; Dadi Prakashmani takes charge as administrative head. | |
| 1980 | The Brahma Kumaris are registered as an NGO in association with the UN Department of Public Information. | |
| 1983 | The movement is granted UN ECOSOC general consultative status. | |
| 1986 | Launch of the "Million Minutes of Peace" appeal at the headquarters for the International Year of Peace. | |
| 1987 | Dadi Prakashmani is named a United Nations Peace Messenger. | |
| 1991 | The J. Watumull Global Hospital and Research Centre opens at Mount Abu. | |
| 1995 | The Gyan Sarovar academic and conference campus is inaugurated on Mount Abu. | |
| 1996 | Shantivan and the Diamond Hall are inaugurated for the movement's Diamond Jubilee. | |
| 2007 | Death of Dadi Prakashmani on 25 August; Dadi Janki becomes administrative head. | |
| 2017 | India One 1MW concentrated solar thermal plant is commissioned at Shantivan, and prime minister Narendra Modi opens the movement's 80th-anniversary international conference at the Diamond Hall by video link on 26 March. | |
| 2020 | Death of Dadi Janki, aged 104. | |
| 2021 | Death of administrative head Dadi Hirdaya Mohini ("Dadi Gulzar") on 11 March; farewell rites at Shantivan two days later. Dadi Ratan Mohini is appointed her successor. | |
| 2023 | Modi visits Shantivan in person on 10 May and lays the foundation stone for the second phase of the Watumull hospital on a 50-acre (20 ha) site. | |
| 2025 | Death of Dadi Ratan Mohini in April, aged 100; Mohini Didi (BK Mohini Panjabi) becomes the sixth administrative head. | |

== See also ==
- Brahma Kumaris
- Dadi Prakashmani
- Dadi Janki
- BK Jayanti
- BK Shivani
- Mount Abu
- Abu Road
