= BK Mohini =

Spiritual leader of the Brahma Kumaris

Mohini Panjabi

Personal life
- Born: 1941 (age 84–85) India
- Home town: Great Neck, New York, U.S.
- Known for: Sixth and current Chief Administrator of the Brahma Kumaris (2025–); Establishing the Brahma Kumaris in the Western Hemisphere (Caribbean, 1976; New York, 1978); Brahma Kumaris representative to the United Nations in New York since 1981; Founding President, Point of Life Foundation, Great Neck, New York (2002–)
- Other names: Mohini Didi; BK Mohini; Sister Mohini
- Occupation: Spiritual leader

Religious life
- Denomination: Brahma Kumaris
- Founder of: Point of Life Foundation (United States; 2002)

Senior posting
- Post: Head Administrator of the Brahma Kumaris
- Period in office: 2025–present
- Predecessor: Dadi Ratan Mohini

Mohini Panjabi (born 1941), also known as Mohini Didi, Sister Mohini or BK Mohini, is an Indian spiritual leader based in the United States who has served since April 2025 as the sixth and current Administrative Head of the Brahma Kumaris. She succeeded Dadi Ratan Mohini, who had died on 8 April 2025 at the age of 100.

Sister Mohini has been living in the United States since 1978, when she established the Brahma Kumaris' first regional headquarters in New York for the Americas and the Caribbean. Since 1981 she has been the Brahma Kumaris' principal representative to the United Nations in New York, a position dating from the organisation's accreditation by what is now the United Nations Department of Global Communications in 1980 and its subsequent grant of General Consultative Status with the UN Economic and Social Council in 1983. Based in Great Neck, New York, she is also President of the Brahma Kumaris World Spiritual Organization of the United States, regional coordinator for the Americas and the Caribbean, and the founding President of the Point of Life Foundation, a US-registered 501(c)(3) charity established in 2002 to apply a values-based approach to healthcare.

== Early life and education ==
Sister Mohini was born in India in 1941. She grew up in Delhi, where she attended the University of Delhi and graduated in 1961 with a Bachelor of Arts in history, political science and journalism. She encountered the Brahma Kumaris movement as a teenager and began studying and serving with the organisation while still a student, with what A Lotus in the Mud described as an inner enquiry into the possibility of cultivating internal peace shaped by the Partition of India.

== Brahma Kumaris service ==
=== India ===
After her graduation, Sister Mohini worked alongside the founder of the Brahma Kumaris, Lekhraj Kirpalani (also known as Brahma Baba), helping to open Brahma Kumaris centres in India. The movement, founded in 1936–37 in Hyderabad in Sindh, had relocated its world headquarters to Mount Abu in Rajasthan in 1950 after the Partition.

=== Move to North America (1974–) ===
In 1974, Sister Mohini began serving the Brahma Kumaris abroad. She helped to establish the organisation's first presence in the Western Hemisphere, with centres in the Caribbean in 1976, before moving to New York in 1978 to set up a regional headquarters covering the United States, Canada and the Caribbean. She has since served as the President of the Brahma Kumaris World Spiritual Organization of the USA and as the Brahma Kumaris' regional coordinator for the Americas and the Caribbean.

In 1999, the Brahma Kumaris opened the Peace Village Learning & Retreat Center, a 300-acre campus in the Catskill Mountains of upstate New York, as its principal residential retreat venue for the Americas, the centre was opened under Sister Mohini's regional leadership.

=== United Nations and interfaith work ===
Sister Mohini has served as the Brahma Kumaris' principal representative to the United Nations in New York since 1981. The Brahma Kumaris World Spiritual University holds General Consultative Status with the United Nations Economic and Social Council (granted in 1983 and upgraded to General Consultative Status in 1998) and is affiliated with the United Nations Department of Global Communications.

In 1993, Sister Mohini served, with BK Jagdish Chander, on the editorial committee of Visions of a Better World, a Brahma Kumaris' compiled volume issued by the Brahma Kumaris as a United Nations Peace Messenger publication, drawing on responses gathered through the Brahma Kumaris coordinated Global Cooperation for a Better World project (1988 - 1993).

The Brahma Kumaris are listed by the Long Island Council of Churches as one of the eleven member faith communities of the Long Island Multi-Faith Forum, an interfaith body convened in 1993 by the Council and Auburn Theological Seminary that has presented hundreds of "Building Bridges" programmes in schools, workplaces and houses of worship across Long Island, where Sister Mohini is based.

=== Call of the Time dialogues ===
Sister Mohini serves as one of the spiritual resources of the Brahma Kumaris' Call of the Time dialogues, a series of small-group retreats originated in 1998 by Dadi Janki that bring together leaders from different sectors and countries for discussion grounded in periods of silent reflection. The series has been co-facilitated since its turning point in 1999 by Peter Senge, senior lecturer at the MIT Sloan School of Management and founding chair of the Society for Organizational Learning; two of its journals Experiments in Silence: Points of Entry and A Mind that is Qualified to Serve were produced with the support of the Fetzer Institute. The North American iteration of the Call of the Time series is hosted at the Peace Village Learning & Retreat Center in upstate New York, with Sister Mohini as one of the principal Brahma Kumaris facilitators.

== Point of Life Foundation ==
Sister Mohini is the founding President of the Point of Life Foundation, a 501(c)(3) not-for-profit registered in Great Neck, New York that was recognised as tax exempt by the Internal Revenue Service in January 2002. The Foundation describes its work as integrating a person centred, values-based approach within existing paradigms in healthcare, and its programmes including the Values in Healthcare: A Spiritual Approach workshop curriculum draw on the working model of the Brahma Kumaris affiliated J. Watumull Global Hospital and Research Centre at Mount Abu. ProPublica Nonprofit Explorer records the Foundation as filing IRS Form 990 returns from 2002 onwards, with Sister Mohini listed as President in every published filing.

== Administrative leadership ==
=== Additional Chief Administrator (2021 - 2025) ===
In June 2021, following the death of Brahma Kumari Dadi Ishu, Sister Mohini was appointed as the organisation's Additional Chief Administrator, alongside the then Chief Administrator Dadi Ratan Mohini. She served in that role for nearly four years.

=== Chief Administrator (2025 - present) ===
Dadi Ratan Mohini, the fifth Chief Administrator, died on 8 April 2025 at the age of 100; her death drew condolences from President Droupadi Murmu and Prime Minister Narendra Modi, among other Indian constitutional functionaries.

On 13 April 2025, Sister Mohini, then 84, was appointed as Dadi Ratan Mohini's successor and the organisation's sixth Chief Administrator; Rajyogini BK Jayanti and BK Munni Didi (Laxmi Aggarwal) was appointed Additional Chief Administrator. The Tribune had described the Brahma Kumaris at the time of Dadi Ratan Mohini's 2021 elevation as "the largest organisation run by women", with about 8,000 service centres in 140 countries.

== Publications ==
- As editor or co-editor
  - Visions of a Better World (1993), United Nations Peace Messenger Publication, published by the Brahma Kumaris World Spiritual University, London (UK); editorial committee with Jagdish Chander Hassija.
  - The Story of Immortality: A Return to Self-Sovereignty (2008), Brahma Kumaris Information, New York; editor and foreword. The volume is listed as recommended reading in the values-and-education syllabus of Alagappa University.
- As author
  - Sharing from the Heart: A Collection of Mohini Didi Classes from Avyakti Parivar (2023).

== See also ==
- Brahma Kumaris
- Dadi Ratan Mohini
- Dadi Janki
- Dadi Prakashmani
- BK Jayanti
- Lekhraj Kripalani
- Raja yoga
