= Dadi Prakashmani =

Indian woman spiritual leader

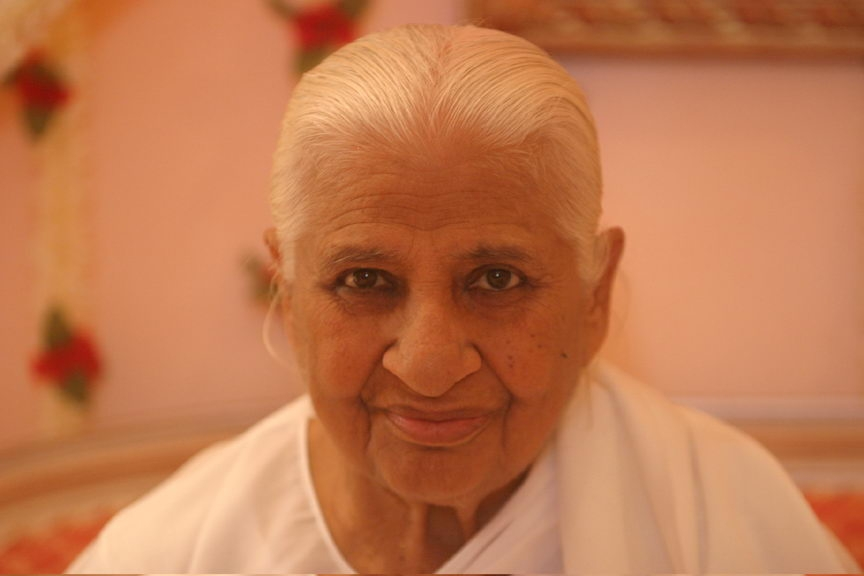
- Title: Administrative Head of the Brahma Kumaris (1969–2007)

Personal life
- Born: c. 1922 Hyderabad, Sindh, British India
- Died: 25 August 2007 Mount Abu, Rajasthan, India
- Known for: Leadership of the Brahma Kumaris; UN Peace Messenger Award; co-development of Living Values Education; signatory to Towards a Global Ethic: An Initial Declaration

Religious life
- Religion: Brahma Kumaris

Senior posting
- Predecessor: Dada Lekhraj
- Successor: Dadi Janki
- Awards: United Nations Peace Messenger Award (1987); Honorary D.Litt., Mohanlal Sukhadia University (1992); Government of India commemorative postage stamp (2023)
- Organisation: Brahma Kumaris

Dadi Prakashmani (c. 1922 – 25 August 2007), also known as Rajyogini Dadi Prakashmani, was an Indian spiritual leader who served as the Administrative Head of the Brahma Kumaris from 1969 until her death. Under her leadership the organisation, headquartered at Mount Abu in Rajasthan, became a United Nations ECOSOC-accredited international non-governmental organisation active in over a hundred countries.

She received the United Nations Peace Messenger Award in 1987, in recognition of the Million Minutes of Peace appeal organised by the Brahma Kumaris during the International Year of Peace (1986). She was named one of the twenty-five Presidents at the 1993 Parliament of the World's Religions in Chicago and participated in the assembly's adoption of Towards a Global Ethic: An Initial Declaration. Under her leadership the Brahma Kumaris contributed to the development of the Living Values Education programme, convened at UNICEF Headquarters in 1996, a values-based curriculum subsequently used in more than eighty countries and the subject of peer-reviewed evaluations in the British Educational Research Journal and Springer's Early Childhood Education Journal.

Commemorative postage stamp of Dadi Prakashmani released by President Droupadi Murmu at Rashtrapati Bhavan on 25 August 2023

In 2023 the Department of Posts of the Government of India released a commemorative postage stamp in her memory under the My Stamp initiative; it was unveiled by President Droupadi Murmu at Rashtrapati Bhavan on the sixteenth anniversary of her death. Academic writing on modern religious movements identifies her as a leading example of female religious leadership in twentieth-century India.

== Early life ==
Dadi Prakashmani was born around 1922 in Hyderabad in the Sindh province of British India.

The Brahma Kumaris movement was founded in the 1930s in Hyderabad, Sindh, by Dada Lekhraj (later known as Brahma Baba). The movement attracted a markedly female membership in its early years and that its early teaching gave women an unusually prominent leadership role.

== Association with the Brahma Kumaris (1937–1969) ==
Following the Partition of India in 1947, the Brahma Kumaris community migrated from Karachi to Mount Abu in Rajasthan around 1950, where it has remained headquartered.

According to the Brahma Kumaris, Dadi Prakashmani worked under Om Radhe (known within the movement as "Mamma"), who served as the institution's first administrative head until her death in 1965. After Brahma Baba's death in 1969, Dadi Prakashmani shared the administrative responsibility with Didi Manmohini.

== Leadership of the Brahma Kumaris (1969–2007) ==
Dadi Prakashmani became the Administrative Head of the Brahma Kumaris in 1969, after the death of Dada Lekhraj on 18 January of that year. She held the position for approximately thirty-eight years until her death in 2007.

During her tenure the organisation expanded from a primarily Indian institution into an international one. Contemporary press accounts reported activity in over a hundred countries by 2007, and the United Nations civil-society database lists the organisation as operating internationally with consultative status under ECOSOC. A profile in Hinduism Today (May 1995) described her as a quietly authoritative figure within the all-women senior leadership at Mount Abu.

Babb (1984, 1986) places her leadership within wider scholarship on female religious authority, identifying the Brahma Kumaris under her direction as a prominent example of institutional female leadership in twentieth-century spiritual movements.

== United Nations engagement ==
Under Dadi Prakashmani's leadership the Brahma Kumaris developed sustained engagement with the United Nations system. The UN DESA civil-society database (ESANGO) records the organisation's affiliation with the United Nations Department of Public Information from 1980, special consultative status with ECOSOC from 1983, an upgrade to general consultative status with ECOSOC in 1998, and ongoing accreditation with UNICEF and as an observer at the UN Framework Convention on Climate Change. Academic surveys of the movement note its NGO status with the United Nations as a marker of its institutional legitimisation during this period.

=== Million Minutes of Peace (1986) ===
During the UN-designated International Year of Peace in 1986, the Brahma Kumaris organised the Million Minutes of Peace appeal, an initiative that gathered pledges of meditation and reflection from participants in dozens of countries. In 1987 the UN Secretary-General Javier Pérez de Cuéllar designated the Brahma Kumaris as a Peace Messenger, with Dadi Prakashmani receiving the award on behalf of the organisation; the designation is recorded in UN General Assembly document A/42/487.

=== Global Cooperation for a Better World (1988–1993) ===
The Brahma Kumaris launched Global Cooperation for a Better World in 1988 as a follow-up project, gathering written and pictorial responses to the question "What is your vision of a better world?" from participants across more than one hundred countries. The compiled material was published in 1993 as Visions of a Better World: A United Nations Peace Messenger Publication and is listed in the University for Peace / Global Energy Network Institute archive of UN-affiliated peace-education publications of that period.

=== International Conference on Values for a Better World (1995) ===
In February 1995, coinciding with the fiftieth anniversary of the United Nations, the Brahma Kumaris held the International Conference on Values for a Better World at Mount Abu, attended by educators, religious leaders, and government representatives. The conference and the simultaneous inauguration of the Academy for a Better World were profiled by Hinduism Today.

== Interfaith engagement ==
Dadi Prakashmani participated in the 1993 Parliament of the World's Religions held in Chicago, the centennial gathering of the original 1893 Parliament. Approximately eight thousand delegates from global faith traditions attended. Hinduism Today, covering the Parliament in November 1993, listed her by name among the twenty-five "Presidents" representing the major spiritual traditions at the assembly — alongside Mata Amritanandamayi, Swami Chidananda Saraswati, the Dalai Lama and others. The Parliament's defining outcome, Towards a Global Ethic: An Initial Declaration, was endorsed by more than two hundred religious leaders present.

== Value education ==
=== Living Values Education ===
In August 1996, twenty educators from five continents convened at UNICEF Headquarters in New York and, in consultation with the Brahma Kumaris, developed the Living Values Education programme, drawing on a Brahma Kumaris guidebook and the Convention on the Rights of the Child as a framework. In 2004 the programme became an independent non-profit organisation, the Association for Living Values Education International (ALIVE), and is currently used in more than eighty countries.

The programme has been the subject of independent peer-reviewed evaluation. Elisabeth Arweck and Eleanor Nesbitt examined its development and classroom use in the British Educational Research Journal in 2004. A 2005 study published in Springer's Early Childhood Education Journal found significant treatment effects on elementary-school students' self-perceptions in scholastic, cognitive and social domains in a Lebanese sample.

=== Partnership with Indian central-government schools ===
In 2010, the Kendriya Vidyalaya Sangathan, the Government of India's central-school system, directed its schools nationally to allow Brahma Kumaris representatives to conduct weekly Peace Education classes for grades VII to IX free of cost. The Indian Express reported that the curriculum was characterised by Kendriya Vidyalaya Sangathan as secular and centred on universal human values, and that the programme had by then been delivered in approximately twenty-nine schools. Value education is recognised as a national educational priority by the Government of India; a PIB release on the Teaching of Value Education in Schools sets out part of the policy framework within which such school programmes are conducted.

=== Academy for a Better World ===
The Academy for a Better World, inaugurated at Mount Abu during the 1995 International Conference on Values for a Better World, hosts residential value-education courses for educators, professionals and students. The Academy was profiled by Hinduism Today in 1995.

== Associations with national leaders ==
- A. P. J. Abdul Kalam, as President of India, addressed Brahma Kumaris audiences at Mount Abu in April 2006; the text of his address is archived on the official President of India website.
- Pratibha Patil, as President of India, issued an official condolence message on Dadi Prakashmani's death in August 2007, in which she described her as "one of the leading lights" of the Brahma Kumaris.
- Narendra Modi, then Chief Minister of Gujarat, attended Dadi Prakashmani's cremation at Mount Abu in August 2007.
- Droupadi Murmu, as President of India, released the commemorative postage stamp in Dadi Prakashmani's memory at Rashtrapati Bhavan in August 2023.

== Women's leadership and public image ==
The Brahma Kumaris is one of the large twentieth-century spiritual movements whose senior administrative offices have been held almost entirely by women. Babb, in his 1986 study and a 1984 article in the journal Signs, characterises the movement's structure as "distinctly feminist" within the contemporary spiritual landscape, with Dadi Prakashmani's near-four-decade tenure frequently cited as an example of female institutional leadership in this context.

GMA News Online, in a 2014 retrospective by Rina Angela Corpus, recalled her as approachable and self-effacing, "always in a white sari" and an "embodiment of simplicity" who maintained a daily routine indistinguishable from that of other students at the Mount Abu campus.

== Awards and honours ==
Year	Honour	Source
1987	United Nations Peace Messenger Award, designated by Secretary-General Javier Pérez de Cuéllar	UN General Assembly Doc A/42/487; GMA News Online
1992	Honorary D.Litt., Mohanlal Sukhadia University, Udaipur, conferred by Rajasthan Governor Chenna Reddy	Hindustan (Rishikesh edition)
1993	Named one of the twenty-five Presidents of the Parliament of the World's Religions, Chicago; assembly adopted Towards a Global Ethic: An Initial Declaration	Hinduism Today; Council for a Parliament of the World's Religions
2023	Commemorative postage stamp released by President of India Droupadi Murmu under the My Stamp initiative	Press Information Bureau (Release ID 1951991); Rashtrapati Bhavan press release

== Death and succession ==
Dadi Prakashmani died on 25 August 2007 at Mount Abu, Rajasthan, aged about eighty-five.

The cremation at Abu Road was attended by Narendra Modi, then Chief Minister of Gujarat, among other dignitaries. President of India Pratibha Patil issued a formal condolence message describing Dadi Prakashmani as "one of the leading lights" of the Brahma Kumaris and noting her contribution to the welfare of society.

She was succeeded as Administrative Head of the Brahma Kumaris by Dadi Janki.

== Memorial events and commemorations ==
=== Universal Brotherhood Day (25 August) ===
The anniversary of Dadi Prakashmani's death is observed annually by the Brahma Kumaris as Universal Brotherhood Day (also called World Brotherhood Day). Independent press coverage of the observance includes reports in Dainik Bhaskar on the annual tribute meeting at Mount Abu and on commemorations elsewhere in India, and reports in the Hindi national daily Hindustan on observances in Rishikesh and Saharsa, Bihar.

=== Dadi Prakashmani Mount Abu International Half Marathon ===
The Dadi Prakashmani Mount Abu International Half Marathon is an annual 21 kilometer road race, run from Manmohini Van in Abu Road to the Brahma Kumaris headquarters in Mount Abu, named in her memory. The race is certified by the Association of International Marathons and Distance Races (AIMS), the international member body of more than 450 leading distance races, which works with World Athletics on standards for international road races. The Tribune has reported a field of about 3,000 runners, while other regional press reports have noted approximately 2,700 participants drawn from seven countries.

== See also ==
- Brahma Kumaris
- Dadi Janki
- Dadi Gulzar
- Dadi Ratan Mohini
- BK Jayanti
- BK Shivani
- Mamma
