= Dadi Ratan Mohini =

Indian spiritual leader of the Brahma Kumaris (1925–2025)

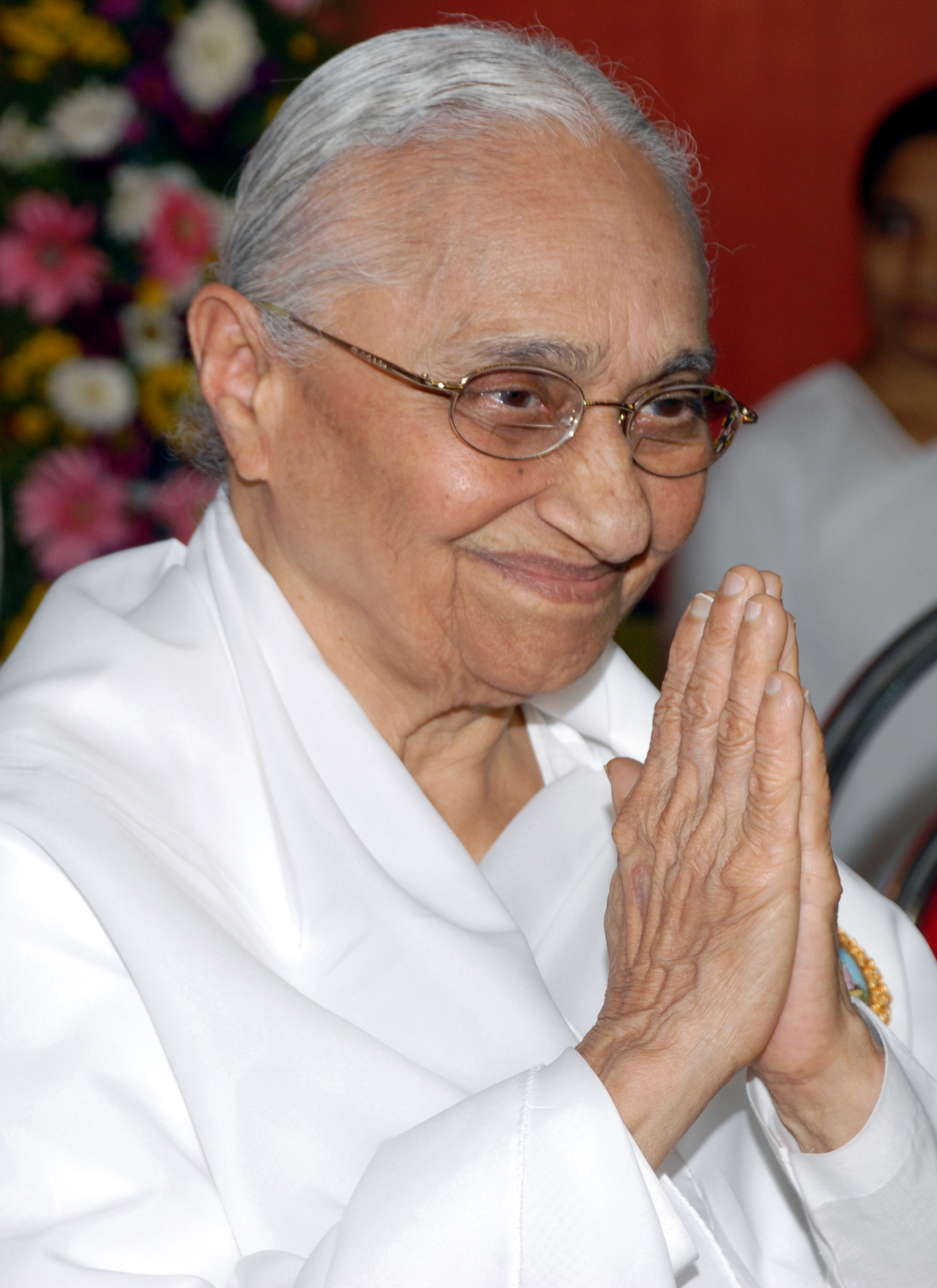
- Dadi Ratan Mohini

Personal life
- Born: 25 March 1925 Hyderabad, Sindh, British India
- Died: 8 April 2025 (aged 100) Ahmedabad, Gujarat, India
- Resting place: Shantivan campus, Abu Road, Rajasthan, India
- Known for: Head Administrator of the Brahma Kumaris (2021–2025); Leadership of an organisation reporting approximately 8,000 service centres in 140 countries
- Other name: Rajyogini Dadi Ratan Mohini
- Occupation: Spiritual leader
- Honors: Honorary doctorate, Gulbarga University (2014)

Religious life
- Denomination: Brahma Kumaris

Senior posting
- Post: Head Administrator of the Brahma Kumaris
- Period in office: 2021–2025
- Predecessor: Dadi Hirdaya Mohini (Dadi Gulzar)
- Successor: BK Mohini

Dadi Ratan Mohini (25 March 1925 – 8 April 2025), also known as Rajyogini Dadi Ratan Mohini, was an Indian spiritual leader and centenarian who served as the Head Administrator of the Brahma Kumaris from March 2021 until her death in 2025 at the age of 100, two weeks after her 100th birthday. She had been associated with the movement since childhood, and in early 2021 was identified in the Inform-published Critical Dictionary of Apocalyptic and Millenarian Movements as one of three senior women then leading the organisation, alongside Dadi Janki and Dadi Hirdaya Mohini ("Dadi Gulzar").

Born in Hyderabad in Sindh in British India and originally named Lakshmi, she joined the Brahma Kumaris in its early years and undertook international spiritual service, including representing the organisation at a 1954 World Peace Conference in Japan and travelling subsequently to Hong Kong, Singapore and Malaysia. Appointed Head Administrator on 16 March 2021 at the age of 96, she led an organisation that reported approximately 8,000 service centres in 140 countries; under her tenure the movement undertook campaigns on women's empowerment, the "Save the Girl Child, Educate the Girl Child" initiative, drug de-addiction, environmental protection and yogic farming. She received an honorary doctorate from Gulbarga University in 2014.

She died at a private hospital in Ahmedabad on 8 April 2025 and was described in obituaries in The Hindu and The Tribune as the second Head of the Brahma Kumaris to reach the age of 100, after Dadi Janki, who had died in 2020 at the age of 104. Her death drew condolences from President Droupadi Murmu, Prime Minister Narendra Modi and other senior constitutional functionaries, and she was succeeded as Chief Administrator by BK Mohini Didi.

== Early life ==
Dadi Ratan Mohini was born on 25 March 1925 in Hyderabad in Sindh, then part of British India. The Tribune, reporting her appointment as Head administrator in 2021, said she had been introduced to the Brahma Kumaris movement as a child; The Statesman described the movement as having been founded in 1937, by which time she was associated with it. The Brahma Kumaris movement was founded by Lekhraj Kirpalani (Brahma Baba) in Hyderabad, Sindh, and relocated its headquarters from Karachi to Mount Abu in Rajasthan in 1950, in the years after the Partition; press accounts noted that her devotion to the organisation took her "from her roots in Hyderabad and Karachi to international service".

== Brahma Kumaris ==
Independent press obituaries of Dadi Ratan Mohini stated that, in 1954, she represented the Brahma Kumaris at a World Peace Conference held in Japan, and that she later travelled to Hong Kong, Singapore and Malaysia to undertake spiritual service. The Hindu reported that in 1985 she embarked on a series of spiritual pilgrimages to promote what the paper described as cultural and moral values, and that in 2006 she undertook a 31,000-kilometre journey across India to spread the organisation's message. Before her appointment as Head Administrator, The Tribune reported that she had been serving as the additional head administrator of the organisation; The Statesman separately described her as the head of the Brahma Kumaris' youth wing "for the last four decades" before her death.

== Head Administrator (2021–2025) ==
On 16 March 2021, after the death of the previous head administrator, Dadi Hirdaya Mohini ("Dadi Gulzar"), Dadi Ratan Mohini, then aged 96, was appointed as the organisation's new head administrator; the same announcement designated Ishu Dadi as additional head administrator and Dr Nirmala as joint head administrator at the Gyan Sarovar academy. The Tribune described the Brahma Kumaris at the time of her appointment as "the largest organisation run by women", with about 8,000 service centres in 140 countries. She held the post until her death in April 2025.

The Statesman wrote that, under her leadership, the Brahma Kumaris ran campaigns on themes including drug de-addiction, women's empowerment, youth awakening, the "Save the Girl Child, Educate the Girl Child" initiative, a "Healthy India" movement, environmental protection and yogic farming.

== Awards and recognition ==
According to The Statesman, a nationwide youth march organised by the Brahma Kumaris under her leadership in 2006 was recorded in the Limca Book of Records, and in 2014 Gulbarga University awarded her an honorary doctorate.

== Death ==
Dadi Ratan Mohini died on 8 April 2025 at the age of 100 in Zydus Hospital in Ahmedabad. Her 100th birthday had been celebrated less than a fortnight earlier, on 25 March 2025. The Hindu and The Tribune described her as the second head administrator of the Brahma Kumaris to reach the age of 100, after Dadi Janki, who died in 2020.

Her body was taken to the conference hall of the Brahma Kumaris' Shantivan headquarters at Abu Road for members of the public to pay their respects, and her last rites were performed there on 10 April 2025. On 13 April 2025, BK Mohini Didi, then 84, was appointed as her successor and the organisation's sixth head administrator.

== Tributes ==
President Droupadi Murmu, who was in Portugal and the Slovak Republic on a state visit at the time, said in a Hindi-language statement that she was "deeply saddened" by the death and described Dadi Ratan Mohini as "a beacon of light for the Brahma Kumari organisation", adding that the organisation had "contributed significantly to my life journey" and that her teachings "will continue to inspire people to follow the path of spirituality and to work for public welfare".

Prime Minister Narendra Modi said that Dadi Ratan Mohini "had a towering spiritual presence" and "will be remembered as a beacon of light, wisdom and compassion", adding that "her life journey, rooted in deep faith, simplicity and unshakable commitment to service will motivate several people in the times to come" and that she had "provided outstanding leadership to the Brahma Kumaris' global movement". Lok Sabha Speaker Om Birla said that her life had been "a source of spiritual light, which continued to inspire countless souls to follow the path of truth, peace and service".

The Chief Minister of Rajasthan, Bhajan Lal Sharma, and the Governor of Rajasthan, Haribhau Bagde, were among those who condoled her death, as were the Chief Minister of Gujarat, Bhupendrabhai Patel, the Governor of Gujarat, Acharya Devvrat, the Chief Minister of Chhattisgarh, Vishnu Deo Sai, former Chief Minister of Rajasthan Vasundhara Raje and Union Minister Shivraj Singh Chouhan.

== See also ==
- Brahma Kumaris
- Dadi Janki
- Dadi Prakashmani
- Dadi Gulzar
- BK Jayanti
- BK Shivani
- Lekhraj Kripalani
