= Brahma Kumaris =

Spiritual organization (1936)

- Brahma Kumaris World Spiritual University
- प्रजापिता ब्रह्माकुमारी ईश्वरीय विश्व विद्यालय
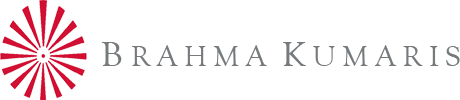
- Logo of the Brahma Kumaris
- Abbreviation: BKWSU
- Formation: 1936; 90 years ago
- Founder: Lekhraj Kripalani (Brahma Baba)
- Founded at: Hyderabad, Sindh, British India
- Type: Spiritual movement
- Legal status: Foundation
- Purpose: Meditation, Spiritual Education, Values-based Living, Healthcare, Environmental Sustainability
- Headquarters: Mount Abu, Rajasthan, India
- Coordinates: 24.5925°N 72.7083°E
- Region served: Worldwide
- Services: Free Raja Yoga meditation courses, values-based living and self-management programmes
- Fields: Spirituality; meditation; education; healthcare; sustainability
- Members: 1,000,000+ students at over 8,000+ centres in 110+ countries (2021)
- Chief Administrator: Dadi Prakashmani (1969–2007); Dadi Janki (2007–2020); Dadi Hirdaya Mohini "Gulzar" (2020–2021); Dadi Ratan Mohini (2021–2025); BK Mohini (2025-present)
- Key people: BK Shivani; BK Jayanti
- Subsidiaries: J. Watumull Global Hospital and Research Centre, Sirohi district (1991); India One Solar Thermal Power Plant, Shantivan, Abu Road (2017); Sustainable Yogic Agriculture programme
- Affiliations: United Nations Economic and Social Council (consultative status, 1983); United Nations Department of Global Communications (registered NGO)
- Awards: UN Peace Messenger (1987, awarded to Dadi Prakashmani); "Million Minutes of Peace" Appeal (UN International Year of Peace, 1986); "Global Co-operation for a Better World" project (United Nations, 1988); Five National Peace Messenger Awards to Brahma Kumaris centres in various countries
- Website: brahmakumaris.com brahmakumaris.org

The Brahma Kumaris (Sanskrit: ब्रह्माकुमारी; "Daughters of Brahma") is a spiritual movement that originated in Hyderabad, Sindh, British India (modern Pakistan) during the 1930s. Founded by Lekhraj Kripalani, the organisation teaches the importance of moving beyond labels associated with the human body, including race, nationality, religion, and gender, through meditation that emphasizes the concept of identity as souls rather than bodies. It aims to establish a global culture centered around what they refer to as "soul-consciousness". The members of the organisation believe that all souls are good by nature and that God is the source of all goodness.

In 2019, the organisation had more than eight thousand centres across 110 countries and more than one million members. Women continue to hold primary leadership positions within the organisation.

== Early history ==
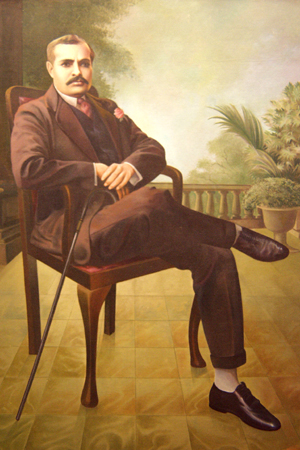
The founder, Lekhraj Kriplani

The Brahma Kumaris organisation was founded in Hyderabad, Sindh, in northwest British India (present-day Pakistan). They were initially known as Om Mandali, as the members would together chant Om before engaging in a spiritual discourse in traditional satsangs (meetings). These original discourses were based on the Bhagavad Gita.

Founder Lekhraj Khubchand Kirpilani (also known as Brahma Baba) was in the jewelry business. In 1935, after witnessing a series of transcendental experiences and visions, he gave up his business to lay the foundation of Om Mandali. He believed that there was a greater power working through him and that many of those who attended the discourses were themselves having spiritual experiences. The majority of those who came were women and children from the Bhaibund caste, which consisted of wealthy merchants and business people whose husbands and fathers were often overseas on business.

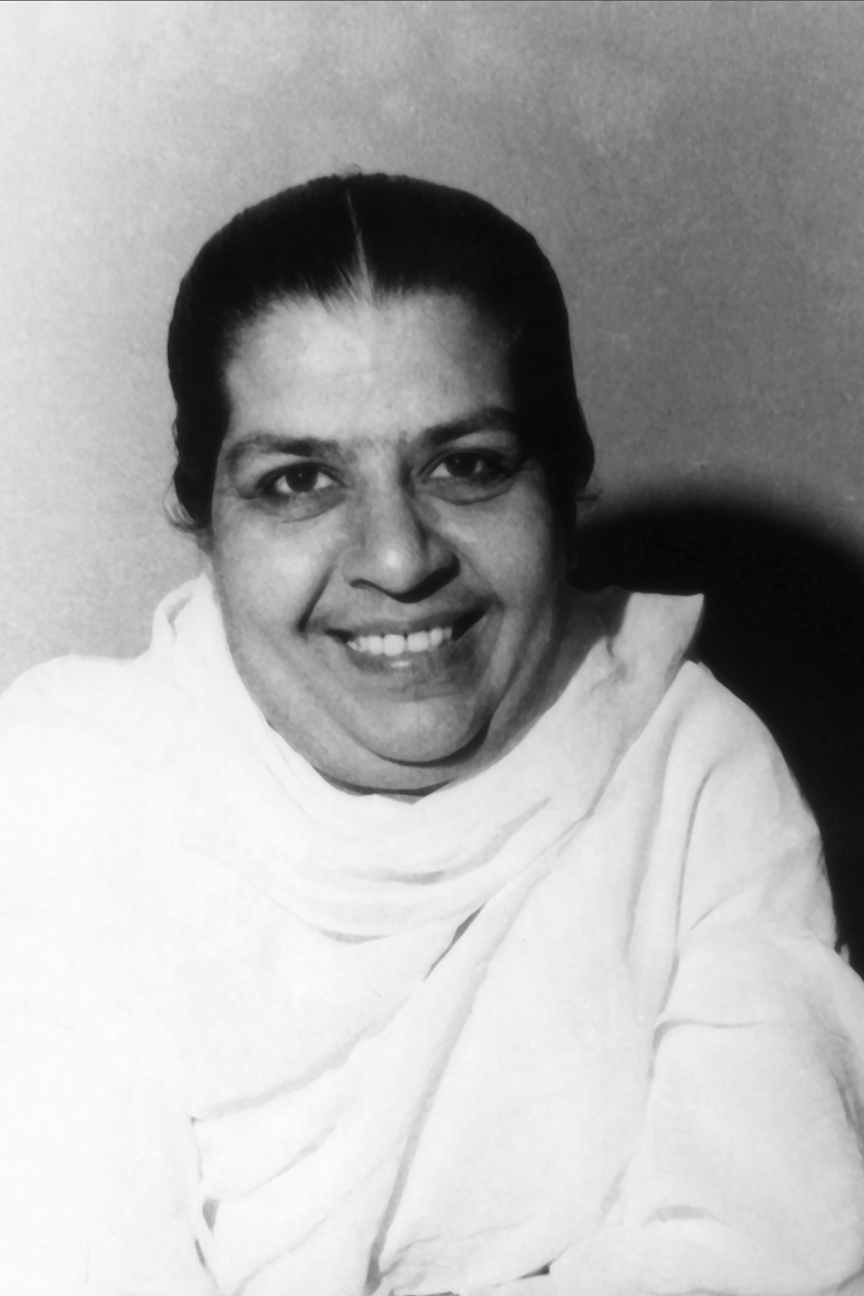
The President of Om Mandali, Radhe Pokardas Rajwani (1916–1965) in about 1964

Three years after its founding, Om Mandali was emphasising the role of women and was not adhering to the caste system. The group had named a 22-year-old woman, Radhe Pokardas Rajwani (then known as "Om Radhe"), as its president, her management committee was made up of eight other women. and people from any caste were allowed to attend meetings. The group also advocated that young women had the right not to marry and that married women had the right to choose celibacy. In tradition-bound patriarchal India, these personal life decisions were the exclusive right of men. When the organization began in the 1930s in Sindh, it sparked controversy by empowering women to assert their right to celibacy, especially in marriage, challenging the male-dominated society of the Indian subcontinent. Feminist commentator Prem Chowdry criticized this practice as a form of patriarchal control. A committee headed by influential male members of the Bhaibund community began to form in opposition and became known as the 'Anti-Om Mandali Committee'. On 21 June 1938, this group picketed the premises of Om Mandali and prevented members from entering and caused considerable upheaval in the community. According to Hodgkinson, women attending the discourses faced verbal abuse and domestic violence. An attempt was made to burn the premises down, and the police made several arrests.

The picketing led to criminal proceedings against both groups. On 16 August 1938 the local District Magistrate ordered that Om Mandali be prevented from meeting. This ban was reversed on 21 November 1938 after an appeal to the Court of the Judicial Commissioner of Sindh. In an unusual move, the judges directly criticised the district magistrate for trying to punish the victims for the disturbance caused by the perpetrators and for trying to apply the law according to their own personal bias. Following these events, Om Mandali decided to leave Hyderabad and relocated their activities to Karachi in the latter half of 1938. Approximately three hundred members moved.

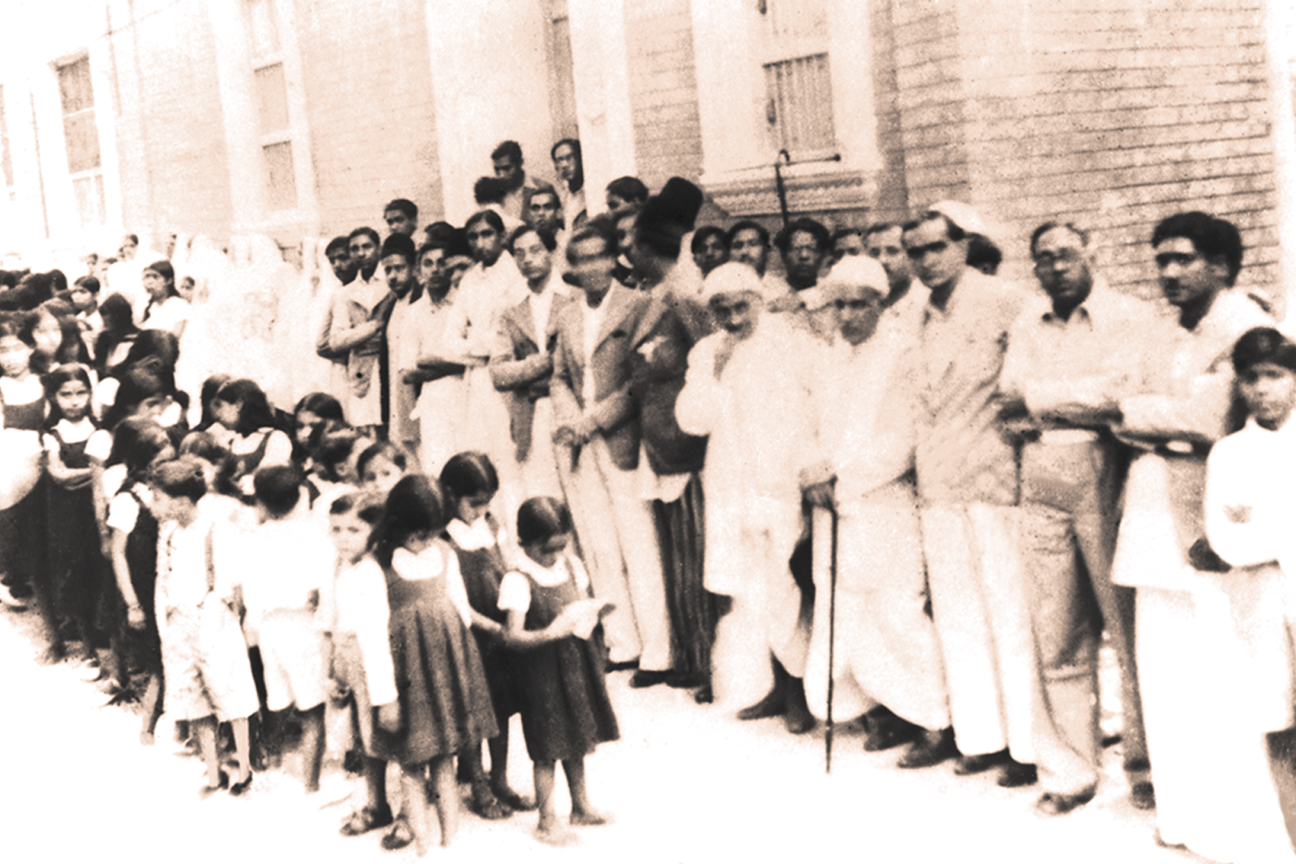
Anti-Om Mandali Committee Picketing, preventing children from entering Om Mandali – Hyderabad Sind India 1938

On 31 March 1939, the government appointed a tribunal to enquire into the activities of Om Mandali. When the tribunal released its findings, Om Radhe responded by compiling a book entitled Is this Justice? criticising the tribunal, which they alleged did not have a constitutional basis and made its findings without obtaining evidence from Om Mandali. In May 1939, the government used the tribunal's findings to effectively reinstate the ban, declaring Om Mandali an "unlawful association" under section 16 of the Criminal Law Amendment Act 1908. Nevertheless, Om Mandali continued to hold their satsangs, and the government did not enforce the ban. Possibly because of this, the committee then hired someone to assassinate Om Baba. The attempt was unsuccessful.

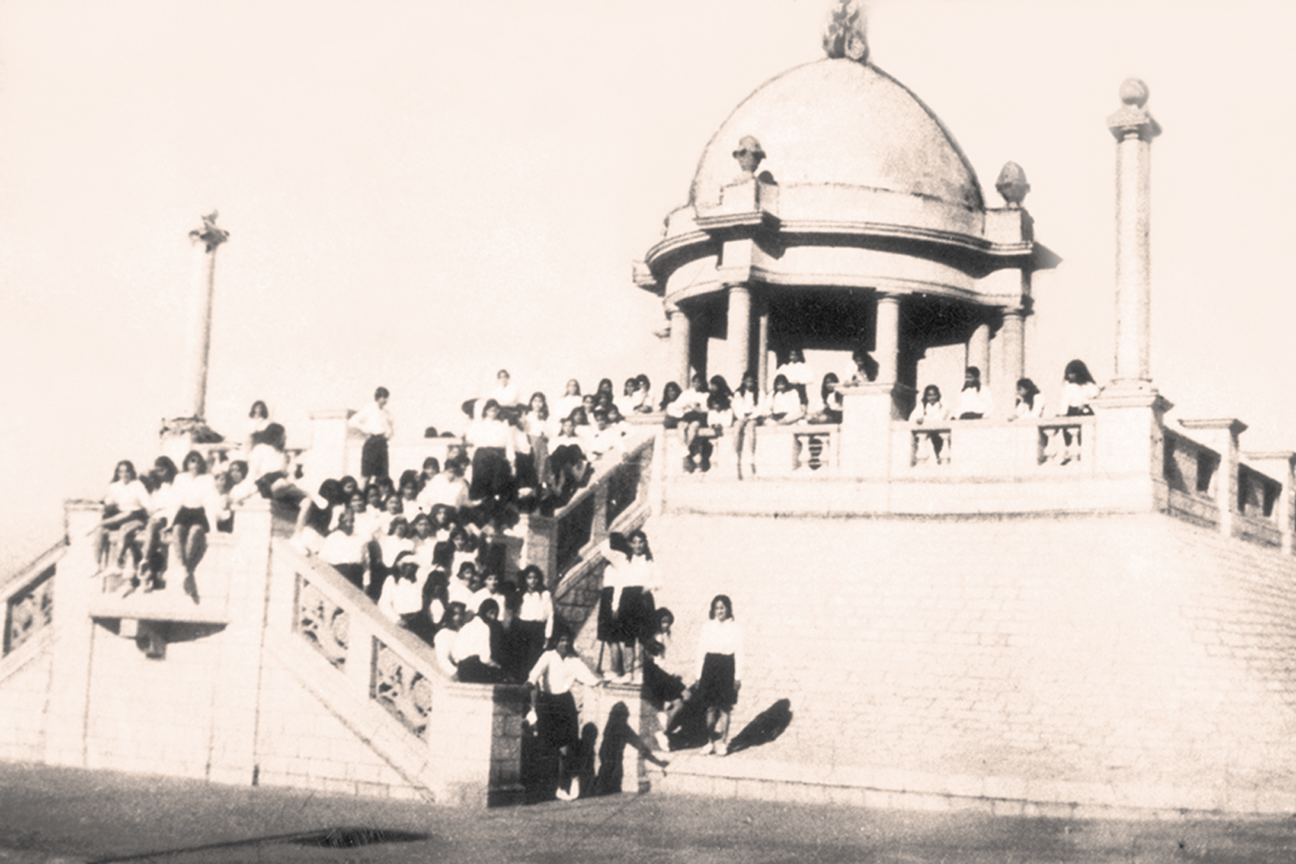
Om Mandali group on an outing at Clifton beach, Karachi, in about 1940

== Expansion ==
In May 1950, Om Mandali moved to Mount Abu in Rajasthan, India. In 1952, a more structured form of teaching was offered to the public through a seven-lesson course.

Brahma Kumaris began an international expansion programme from the mid-1950s. Since the 1970s, it has spread to London and then throughout the West. The most visible manifestations of the organisation are its spiritual museums, located in most major Indian cities.

The organization expanded its presence to the United States in 1976. Following an initial public lecture series in San Antonio, Texas, in January 1976, the first official Raja Yoga Center in the U.S. was established in San Antonio in December 1976 by early practitioners including Sister Denise and Brahma Kumari Chandru. The Brahma Kumaris was subsequently legally incorporated as a Texas nonprofit organization on August 30, 1977.

In 1980, the Brahma Kumaris became registered as a nongovernmental organisation with the United Nations Department of Global Communications. In 1983, the Brahma Kumaris achieved consultative status with the United Nations Department of Economic and Social Affairs.

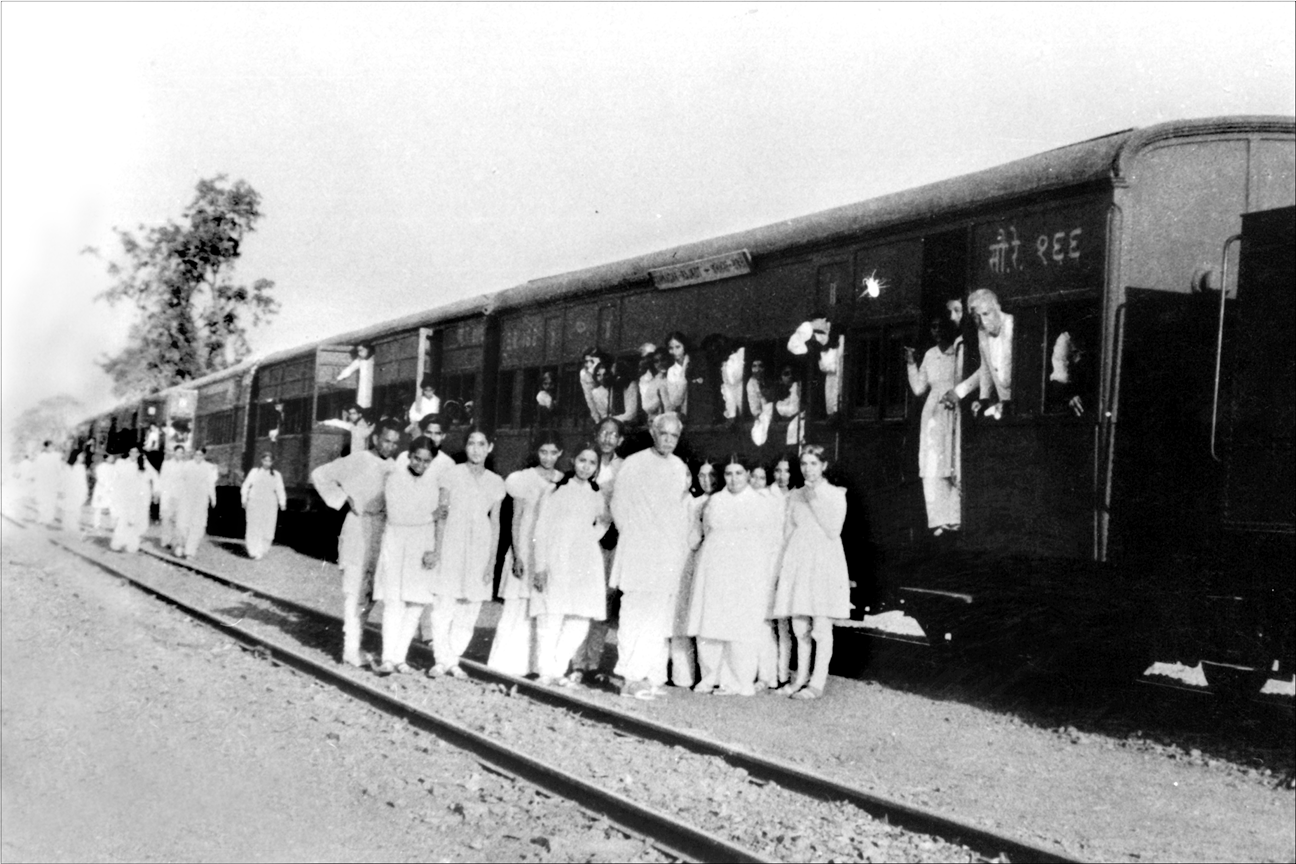
A photo of the Brahma Kumaris during their relocation from Karachi to Mount Abu Rajasthan in May 1950

The leadership and membership of the BK movement remains primarily female: in the UK, only one-third of the forty-two centres are run by men, and women comprise eighty percent of the membership. As of February 2015, centres are mostly in followers' own homes with a tendency toward middle- or upper-class membership. Estimates for its worldwide membership range from thirty-five thousand in 1993 to four hundred thousand in 1998 to four hundred fifty thousand in 2000; however, many adherents are probably not completely committed to the group's worldview.

== Brahma Kumaris Wings ==
The organisation's outreach and service activities are organised through the Rajyoga Education and Research Foundation (RE&RF), a society registered under the Societies Registration Act in 1982 and based at the Mount Abu headquarters. The Foundation directs Brahma Kumaris service work through approximately twenty constituent wings, each addressing a particular professional or social sector through training programmes, conferences, retreats and awareness campaigns. Sector-specific wings have been a longstanding feature of BK organisational structure and have been noted in academic accounts of the movement's international expansion and recruitment strategy.

The wings currently listed by the organisation are:

- Administrators' Service Wing — runs self-management and meditation training programmes for executives in public- and private-sector institutions.
- Agriculture and Rural Development Wing — operates rural literacy, health-awareness and meditation programmes; oversees the Sustainable Yogic Agriculture initiative (see § Sustainable Yogic Agriculture).
- Art and Culture Wing — engages with artists and performers through retreats and creative programmes.
- Business and Industry Wing — provides training in stress management, ethics and meditation for business owners and corporate professionals.
- Education Wing — supplies values-education materials and meditation training for school and college teachers and students (see § Education).
- Information Technology Wing — runs introductory meditation workshops and retreats targeted at information-technology professionals.
- Jurists Wing — engages with judges, lawyers and other members of the legal profession through ethics-and-meditation programmes.
- Media Wing — runs training and dialogue programmes for journalists and other media workers.
- Medical Wing — convenes conferences for health professionals and publishes material on what the organisation describes as the role of meditation in holistic health (see § Healthcare).
- Politicians' Service Wing — runs meditation and ethics programmes for elected officials and political workers.
- Religious Wing — organises inter-religious dialogue events intended to identify shared ethical themes across faith traditions.
- Scientists and Engineers Wing — convenes conferences and runs programmes on the relationship between science, technology and meditative practice.
- Security Services Wing — runs stress-management and meditation programmes for police and other security personnel.
- Shipping, Aviation and Tourism Services Wing — runs meditation programmes for workers in the transport and hospitality sectors.
- Social Service Wing — runs awareness programmes on issues such as substance addiction and harmful social practices.
- SpARC Wing (Spiritual Application Research Centre) — coordinates research collaborations on scientific and metaphysical subjects between BK members and outside specialists.
- Sports Wing — runs sport-psychology and concentration programmes for athletes.
- Transport and Travel Wing — provides training for transport-industry workers in emotional regulation and stress management.
- Women's Wing — runs meditation, training and awareness programmes for women, with a stated focus on social issues affecting women.
- Youth Wing — has run meditation outreach and value-education programmes for young people since 1985.

Sociologists studying the movement have observed that the proliferation of profession-specific wings reflects a strategy of reaching potential sympathisers through their workplaces and professional networks rather than through generic mass outreach.

== Beliefs ==
The movement has distinguished itself from its Hindu roots and sees itself as a vehicle for spiritual teaching rather than as a religion. Hudson describes the Brahma Kumaris as advancing a reformed Hinduism, keeping many doctrines and vocabulary, while rejecting others.

=== Self ===
The Brahma Kumaris view humans as composed of two parts: an external visible body, which includes aspects like status and possessions, and a subtle energy known as the soul. The character structure of the soul is expressed through a person's external actions. However, regardless of the outward appearance, whether actions are carried out with love, peace, happiness, or humility, reflects the essence of one's soul. The Brahma Kumaris teach that the soul is an infinitesimal point of spiritual light residing in the forehead of the body it occupies, and that all souls originally existed with God in a "Soul World", a world of infinite light, peace and silence.

The Brahma Kumaris teach that souls enter bodies to take birth in order to experience life and give expression to their personality. Unlike other Eastern traditions, the Brahma Kumaris do not believe that the human soul can transmigrate into other species.

=== Supreme Soul ===
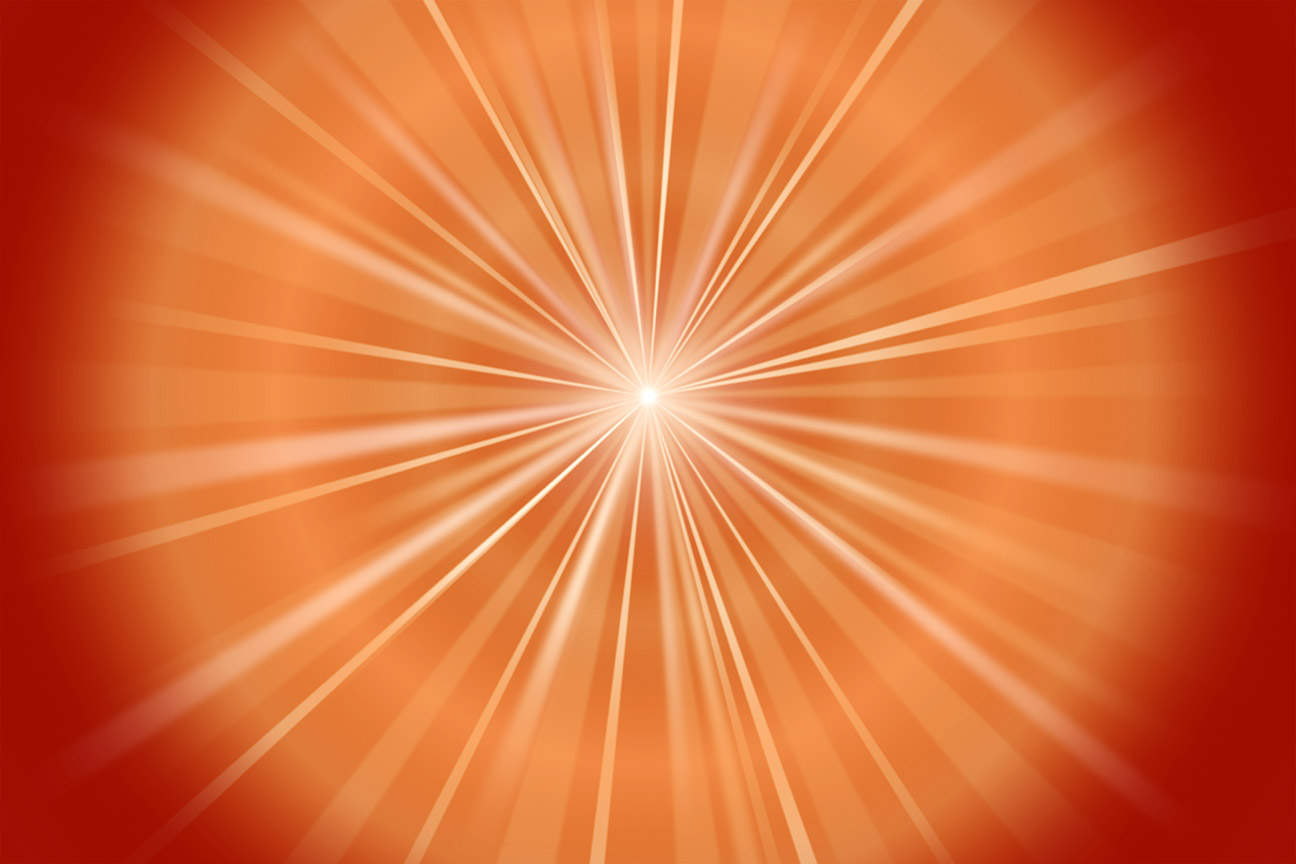
Brahma Kumaris believe God to be an incorporeal point of light.

The Brahma Kumaris use the term "Supreme Soul" to refer to God. They see God as incorporeal and eternal, regarding him as a point of living light like a human soul but lacking a physical body, as he does not enter the cycle of birth, death, and rebirth. God is seen as the perfect and constant embodiment of all virtues, powers, and values, the unconditionally loving father of all souls, without respect to religion, gender, or culture.

=== Karma ===
The Brahma Kumaris teach that each action performed in consciousness leaves karmic traces that shape future experience and eventual rebirth, and that disciplined meditation can purify habitual patterns and thereby improve both present circumstances and successive lives.

=== Cycle of time ===
The Brahma Kumaris believe the universe to follow an eternal, naturally occurring 5,000-year cycle, composed of four ages (yugas), each of 1250 years: the Golden Age (Satya Yuga), the Silver Age (Treta Yuga), the Copper Age (Dvapara Yuga), and the Iron Age (Kali Yuga). They also believe that at the end of the Iron Age there will be "Destruction.", which will kill everyone on Earth and cleanse the Earth, and the cycle repeats. The present period of this cycle is sometimes described as a fifth age or "Confluence age" as it is considered to be the confluence (the junction or meeting) between the Iron Age and the Golden age.

The first half of the cycle (the Golden and Silver ages) is considered to be the age of "soul conscious living". The Brahma Kumaris see this as a time of "heaven on earth" or as a version of the Garden of Eden when human beings are fully virtuous, complete, self-realised beings who live in complete harmony with the natural environment. The primary enlightenment was the innate understanding of the self as a soul.

When the organisation began, emphasis was placed on the physical destruction of the world as seen in the cataclysmic visions of Dada Lekhraj. As the organisation developed, it witnessed World War II, the atomic bombings of Hiroshima and Nagasaki and the Cold War, and the destructive aspects of its teachings were reframed as a process of transformation. The original teachings referred to a particular date 1976, and students of the organization had also made failed predictions of the violent destruction of the world between 1987 and 2008. The Brahma Kumaris believe that modern civilization will be destroyed by global nuclear conflict, coupled with natural calamities and that these cataclysmic events form part of a natural and cathartic cyclic process. Adherents have been criticised by nonmembers for hiding or downplaying their prophesied physical destruction of the world However, the Brahma Kumaris maintain that their primary purpose is to teach meditation and peace of mind.

== Practices ==
=== Meditation ===
The Brahma Kumaris teaches a form of meditation through which students are encouraged to purify their minds. This may be done by sitting tranquilly, then making affirmations regarding the eternal nature of the soul, the original purity of one's nature, and the nature of God. The aim of the Brahma Kumaris meditation is also to learn to hold meditative states while being engaged in everyday life. For this reason, meditation is usually taught and practiced with open eyes.

=== Good wishes and pure feelings ===
The Brahma Kumaris practice Shubbhawna (pure feelings) and Shubkamna (good wishes). Prejudices and ill-feelings are seen as arising from identifying the self and others based on external labels like race, religion, gender, and nationality. The practice of finding the intrinsic goodness in each person is intended to replace such prejudice with universal spiritual values such as respect, love, peace and happiness. A slogan for the Brahma Kumaris is When we change, the world changes.

=== Study (murli) ===
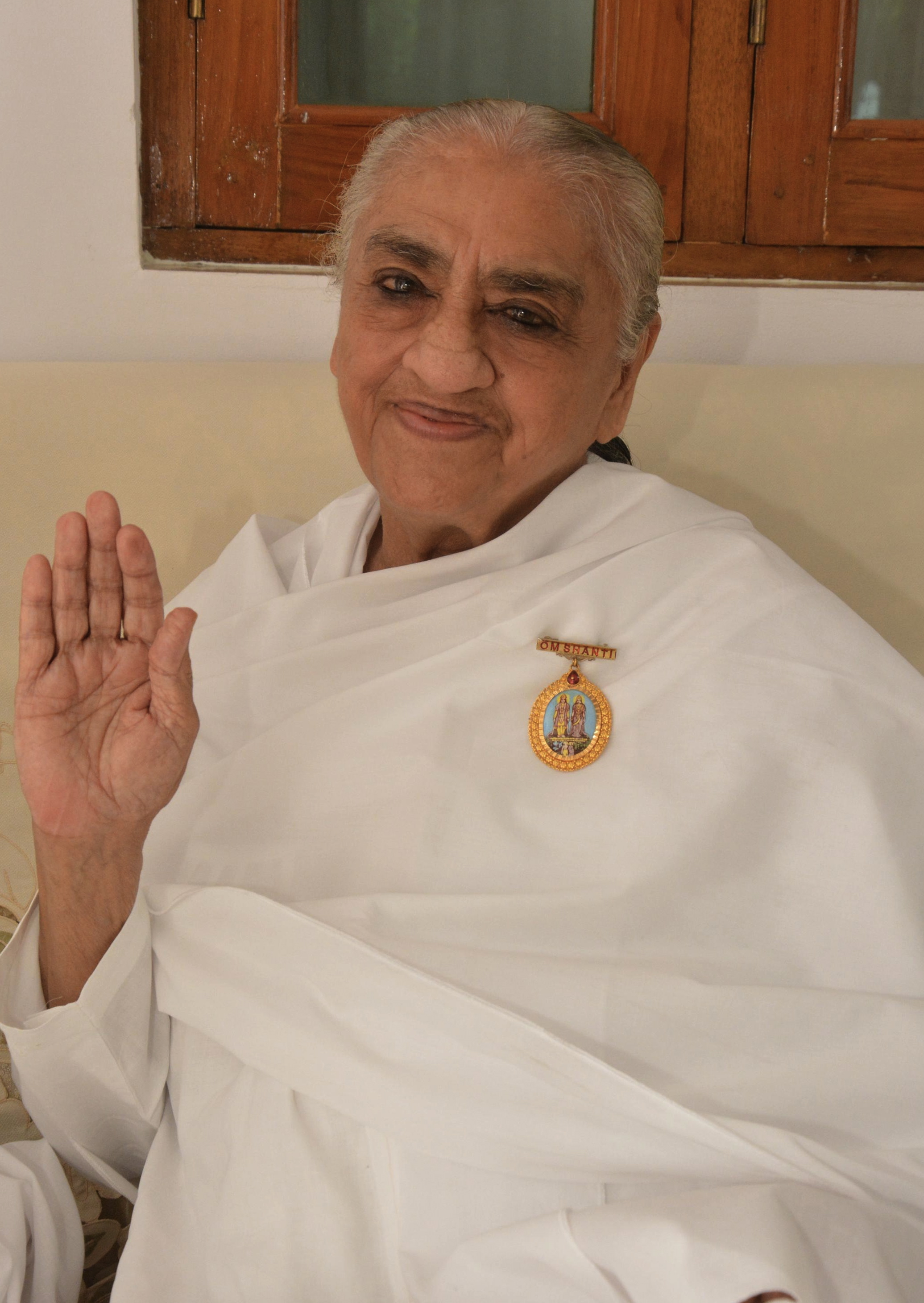
Dadi Gulzar, a member of the Brahma Kumaris since its inception in the 1930s

Brahma Kumaris' students study the murli. The Hindi word murli literally translates to "flute". It is an oral study, read to the class early each morning in most BK centres on the world. The murlis are derived from mediumship and spirit possession.

There are two types of murli:

1. Sakar Murlis refer to the original orations that BKs believe to be the Supreme Soul speaking through Brahma Baba.
2. Avyakt Murlis are spoken by BapDada. BKs believe BapDada is God and the soul of their deceased founder. BapDada(God) is believed to speak to the BKs through a senior BK medium, Dadi Gulzar.

The Brahma Kumaris believe God's purpose is to be the spiritual re-awakening of humanity and the removal of all sorrow, evil and negativity. They do not regard God as the creator of matter, as they consider matter to be eternal.

=== Lifestyle ===
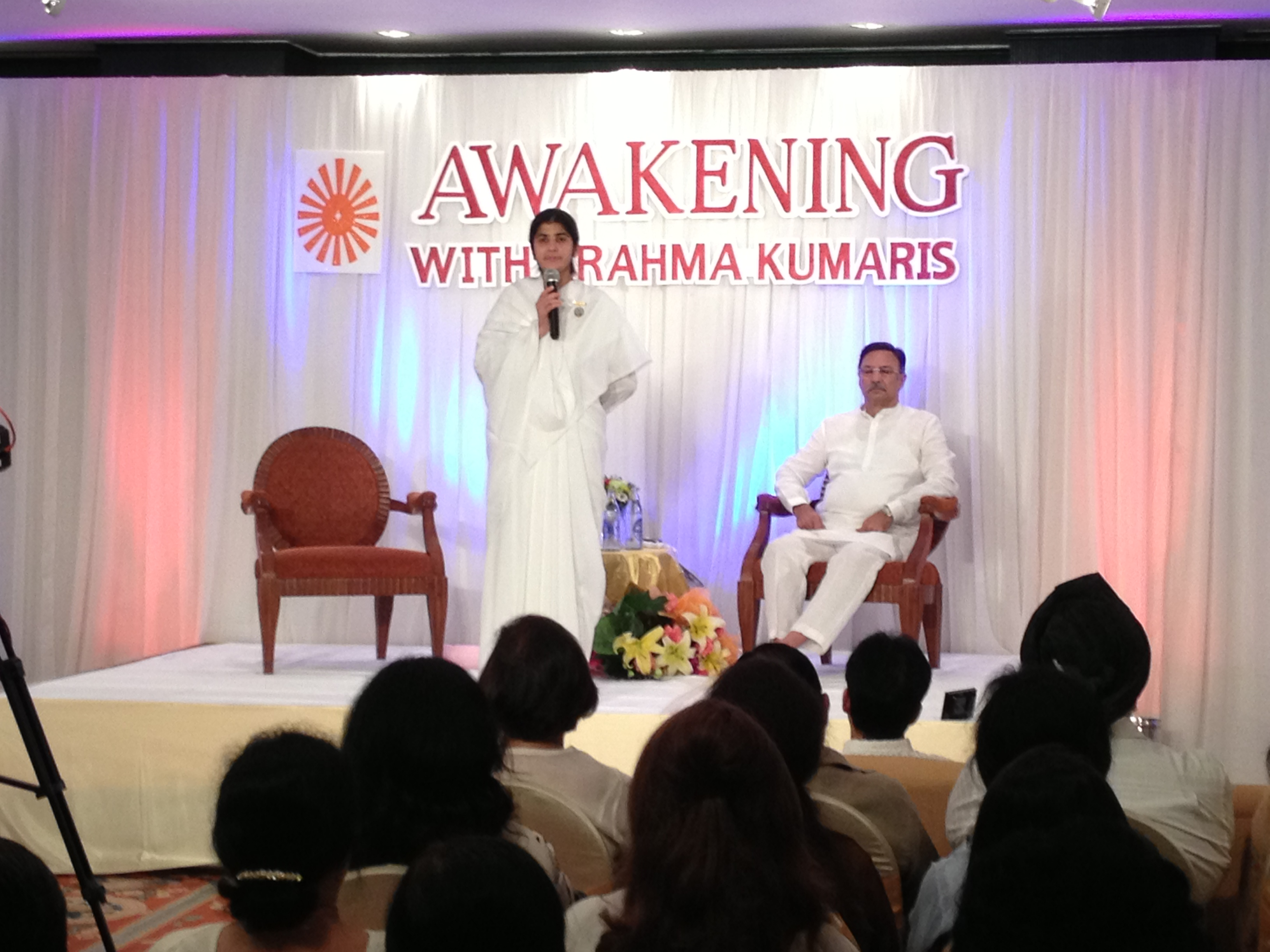
BK Sister Shivani Verma and Suresh Oberoi in Bangkok on the pay-to-broadcast television program Awakening with Brahma Kumaris

Brahma Kumaris recommend a specific lifestyle to achieve greater control over the physical senses. However, many participate in a casual way, electing to adopt whichever beliefs and lifestyle disciplines in the following list they wish:

- Complete celibacy, whether in or out of marriage
- Sattvic lacto-vegetarian diet (excluding eggs, onions, garlic, and spicy foods) cooked only by the self or other Brahma Kumaris members.
- Abstention from alcohol, tobacco, and nonprescription drugs.
- Daily early-morning meditation (Amrit Vela) from 4:00 to 4:45 a.m.
- Daily morning class at approximately 6:30 a.m.
- Frequent wear of white attire to symbolise purity.
- Preference for the company of other BK followers.

John Wallis wrote a book examining the status of tradition in the contemporary world, which used the religion as a case study, focusing on recruitment methods, the issue of celibacy, and reinterpretation of religious history. He reported the rewriting of the revelatory messages (Murlis) by the Brahma Kumari. They have been accused of breaking up marriages.

The Journal for the Scientific Study of Religion reported that the Brahma Kumaris require a payment from families wishing to dedicate their daughters to the organization, intended to cover living expenses during the trial period, as a way to prevent families from "dumping" their daughters.

== Activities ==
=== Education ===
Traditionally, the Brahma Kumaris conducted an introduction to meditation consisting of seven two-hour-long sessions. The sessions include their open-eyed meditation technique and their philosophy. The organisation also offers courses in "positive thinking", "self management leadership" and "living values". They also have a number of voluntary outreach programs in prisons.

With the support of Vicente Fox, the Brahma Kumaris introduced their meditation practice and philosophy to the government of Mexico through the "Self Management Leadership" (SML). The SML course is closely related to the Brahma Kumaris philosophy and is the backbone of Brahma Kumaris management philosophy. 90 trained facilitators ran programs through which 25,000 people at the top level of government have passed.

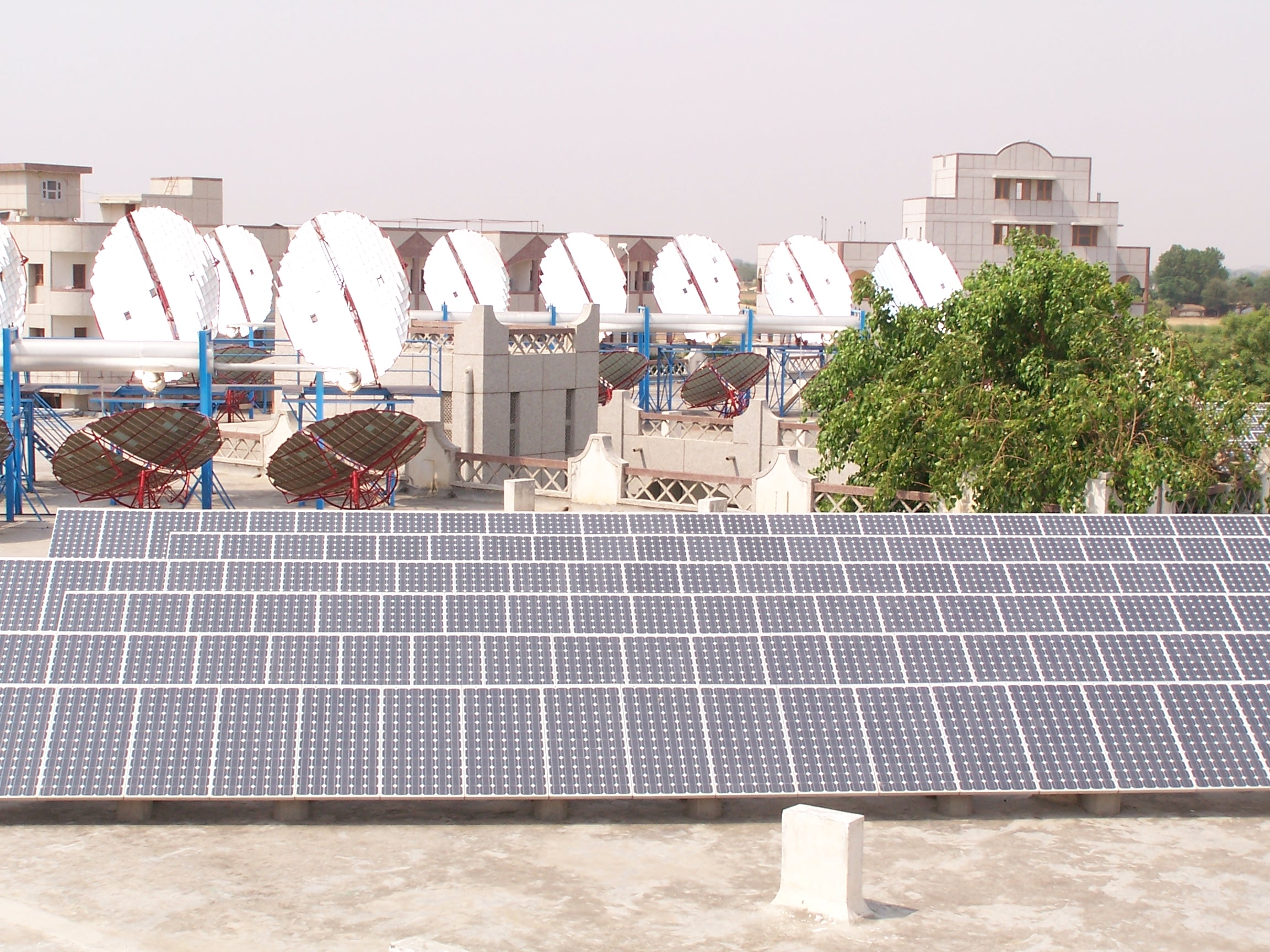
A large solar generator at the Brahma Kumaris HQ

=== Renewable energy ===
The Brahma Kumaris have launched several environment initiatives. Their work in solar energy and sustainable energy has included the 2007 development of the world's largest solar cooker, and a solar thermal power plant in Talheti, Abu Road at the base of Mount Abu, where the international headquarters is located. The 25-acre site is projected to produce 22000 kwh of electricity daily. The project was made financially possible with the support of the Indian and German governments.

=== Sustainable Yogic Agriculture ===
Sustainable Yogic Agriculture (SYA) is a program started in Northern India in 2009. The program has been a collaboration between Sardarkrushinagar Dantiwada Agricultural University in Gujarat India and the Brahma Kumaris Rural Development wing. The program has now been publicly backed by the Indian Government. A key member of Narendra Modi's Cabinet, Agriculture Minister Radha Mohan Singh announced the government's support for the program. With the government's support the program has been redesigned into Akhil Bharatiya Krushak Sashakatikaran Abhijan (ABKSA), and was launched in December 2015. ABKSA extends the initial scope of the SYA program to include teaching meditation and self empowerment to the farmers themselves. This is possibly a response to the problem of farmer suicides in India. ABKSA now comprises three main elements:

1. A self empowerment program for Indian farmers;
2. Ongoing research on whether the use of meditation can improve crop yields;
3. Education on a blend of traditional and organic farming techniques.

One basic premise of the Brahma Kumaris environmental initiative is that thoughts and consciousness can affect the natural environment.

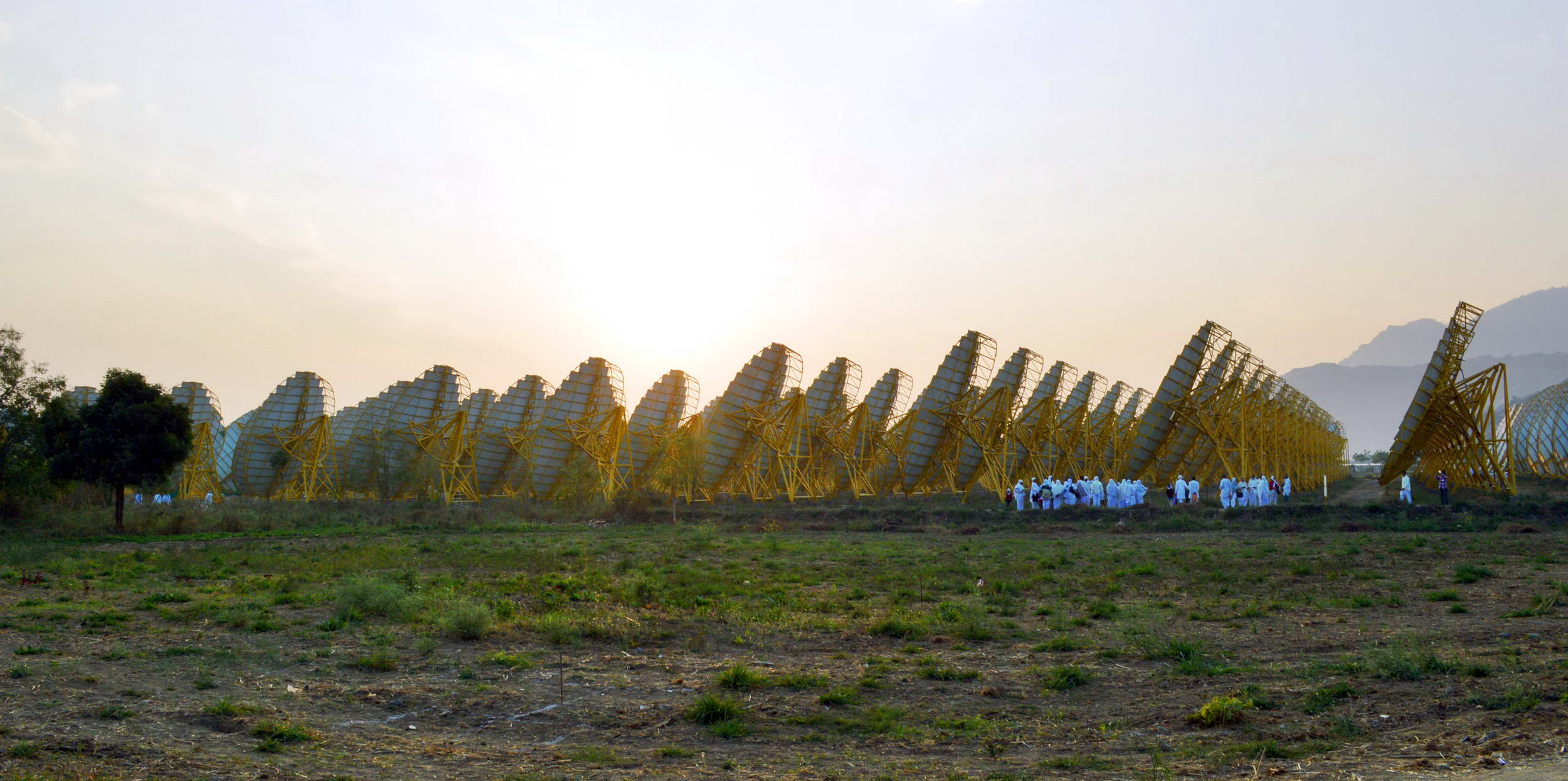
India One Solar Thermal Power Plant – India – Brahma Kumaris. April 2014

In 2012, experiments were being conducted in partnership with leading agricultural universities in India to establish if the practice of Brahma Kumaris meditation in conjunction with implementing more traditional organic farming methods could be shown to have a measurable and positive effect on crop development. An article published in the Journal of Asian Agri-History reviews two separate studies on SYA. One study was conducted by G.B. Pant University of Agriculture and Technology (GBPUAT), Pantnagar, Uttarakhand and the other by Sardarkrushinagar Dantiwada Agricultural University (SDUAT) of Gujarat. The review reports that the Brahma Kumaris meditation techniques used enhanced seed growth, seed germination rates and increased the level of microbes present in the soil.

=== Healthcare ===
In 1991, the Brahma Kumaris, Ashok Mehta, and the brothers Gulab and Khubchand Watumull opened the J Watumull Global Hospital in the Sirohi district of Rajasthan, offering medical facilities to the local population.

== See also ==
Associated concepts

- Meditation
- Mediumship
- Millenarianism
- Adhyatmik Ishwariya Vishwa Vidyalaya

General

- Hindu reform movements
- New religious movement
