= Dadi Janki =

Indian spiritual leader (1916–2020)

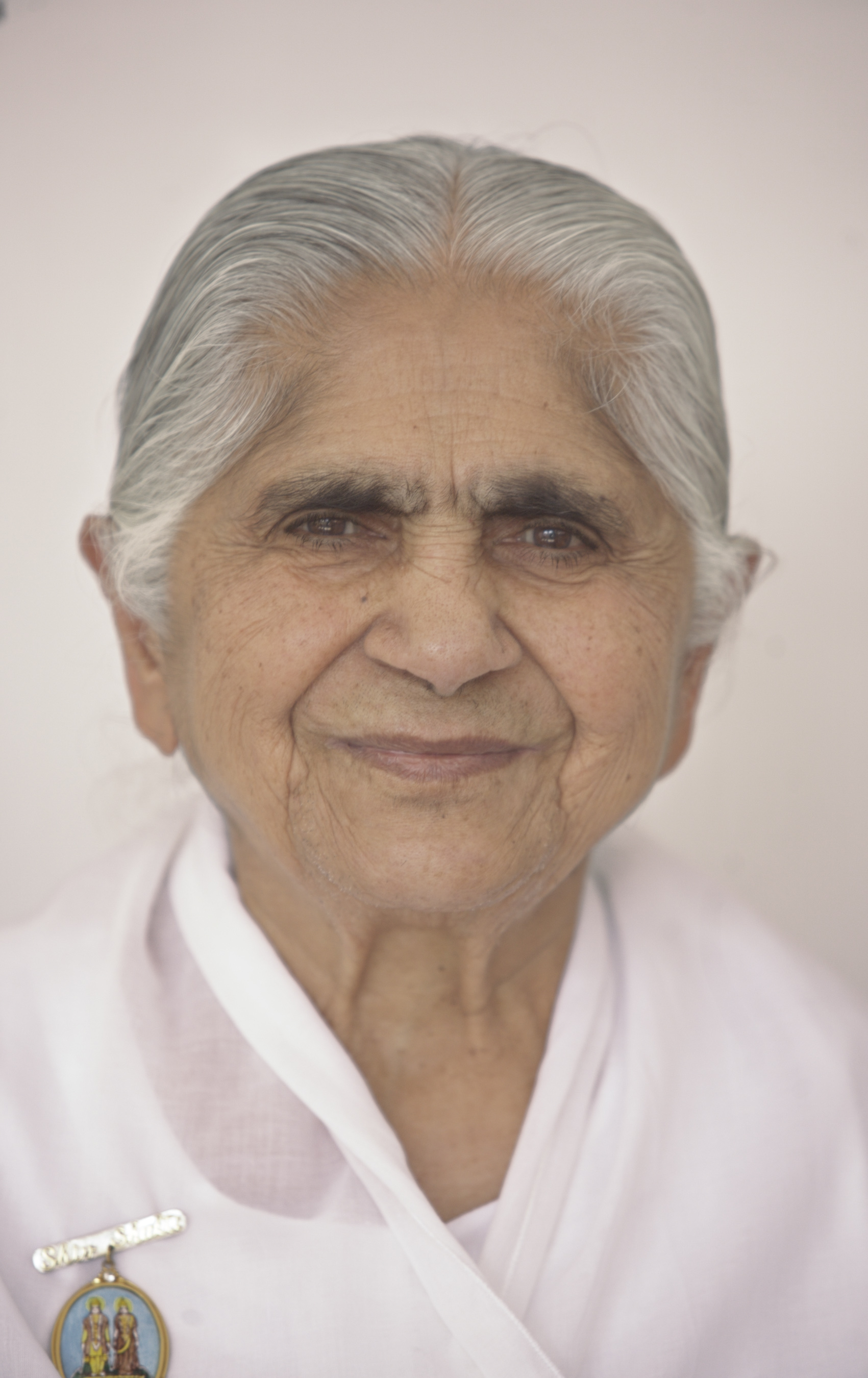
- Dadi Janki in 2007

Personal life
- Born: 1 January 1916 Hyderabad, Sind, British India
- Died: 27 March 2020 (aged 104) Mount Abu, Rajasthan, India
- Resting place: Shantivan campus, Abu Road, Rajasthan, India
- Known for: Head Administrator of the Brahma Kumaris (2007–2020); Establishing the first Brahma Kumaris centre outside India (London, 1974); Founding the Janki Foundation for Spirituality in Health Care (1997); Coordinating international peace projects from London, including the 1986 Million Minutes of Peace appeal for the International Year of Peace
- Other name: Rajyogini Dadi Janki
- Occupation: Spiritual leader
- Honors: Peace Abbey Courage of Conscience Award (2005); Brand Ambassador, Swachh Bharat Mission; Commemorative postage stamp issued by India Post (2021, posthumous)

Religious life
- Denomination: Brahma Kumaris
- Founder of: Janki Foundation for Spirituality in Health Care (1997)

Senior posting
- Post: Head Administrator of the Brahma Kumaris
- Period in office: 2007–2020
- Predecessor: Dadi Prakashmani
- Successor: Dadi Hirdaya Mohini (Dadi Gulzar)

Dadi Janki (1 January 1916 – 27 March 2020), also known as Rajyogini Dadi Janki, was an Indian spiritual leader and centenarian who served as the Head Administrator of the Brahma Kumaris from August 2007 until her death in 2020 at the age of 104. She had joined the movement in around 1937, when she was 21, and was described in obituaries and tributes as one of its founding members.

In 1974, at the age of 58 and speaking no English, Janki moved to the United Kingdom to establish the first Brahma Kumaris centre outside India, and lived in London for around three decades. Under her later administration the organisation reported more than 8,000 centres in over 100 countries, the great majority of them headed by women. From the Brahma Kumaris' London centre she was associated with several international peace and interfaith projects from the mid-1980s, founded the UK-registered Janki Foundation for Spirituality in Health Care in 1997, and was a 2005 recipient of the Peace Abbey's Courage of Conscience Award. She was appointed a brand ambassador of the Government of India's Swachh Bharat Mission and, on the first anniversary of her death, was honoured with a commemorative postage stamp released by Vice President M. Venkaiah Naidu.

== Early life ==
Janki was born on 1 January 1916 in Hyderabad in Sind in British India (now in Pakistan) to a Sindhi Hindu family. A 2002 feature in The Times of India described the family as "devout, philanthropic and wealthy", and reported that she had received only a few years of formal education; The New Indian Express likewise wrote in its 2020 obituary that she had studied only up to the fourth standard. She joined the spiritual community that became the Brahma Kumaris at the age of 21.

== Brahma Kumaris ==
The Brahma Kumaris movement was founded in Hyderabad, Sind, in 1936–37 by the Prajapita Brahma, who organised an early devotional gathering called Om Mandali that was formally constituted as the Prajapita Brahma Kumaris Ishwariya Vishwa Vidyalaya in October 1937. Janki was among the small founding cohort of women, mostly drawn from the Sindhi Bhaiband community, who took up residence in the original Hyderabad community. Following sustained local opposition the community relocated to Karachi in 1938, and in 1950 it moved to its present world headquarters at Mount Abu in Rajasthan in independent India, where Janki spent much of the next two decades.

After the death of the founder Brahma Baba in January 1969, the Brahma Kumaris was administered by Dadi Prakashmani as Head Administrator, with Janki working alongside her in the senior leadership of the organisation and sharing in its day-to-day administration. Working with Prakashmani, she shaped the movement's growth and its international expansion in the decades.

== Move to the United Kingdom ==
In April 1974, Janki was sent to London to establish the first Brahma Kumaris centre outside India. She was 58 at the time and spoke no English; according to the United Religions Initiative tribute by its founding executive director Charles Gibbs, she travelled with the knowledge that British immigration rules would prevent her from returning to India for several years. She was assisted on arrival by Sister Jayanti, a younger Sindhi-British member of the movement who acted as her interpreter. The London centre, later known as Global Co-operation House, became the international coordinating office of the Brahma Kumaris and the base from which centres were progressively established in continental Europe, the Americas, Africa, Australia and East Asia. Janki lived in the United Kingdom for around three decades.

== International peace and interfaith work ==
From the mid-1980s onwards, Janki was associated with several international peace and interfaith initiatives organised through the Brahma Kumaris' London centre. According to the organisation, in 1986 she launched the Million Minutes of Peace appeal as the Brahma Kumaris' contribution to the United Nations' International Year of Peace; the campaign asked supporters to pledge minutes spent in meditation, prayer or positive thinking rather than money, and pledges totalling approximately 1.23 billion minutes from 88 countries were presented to UN Secretary-General Javier Pérez de Cuéllar in October 1986. The appeal was followed in 1988 by Global Co-operation for a Better World, a similar initiative collecting people's visions for positive change from over 120 countries.

A 2002 feature in The Times of India reported that in 1992 she was invited as one of ten "Keepers of Wisdom", a group of spiritual leaders convened to advise the Earth Summit in Rio de Janeiro on the spiritual dimensions of environmental questions, and that the same group reconvened at the Habitat II conference in Istanbul in June 1996. During the same period the Brahma Kumaris contributed to the early development of Living Values Education, a values-based school curriculum designed in collaboration with the Education Cluster of UNICEF at a meeting of twenty educators from five continents convened at UNICEF Headquarters in New York in August 1996. A 2011 profile in The Interfaith Observer described her, at the age of 95, as a frequent participant in international interfaith gatherings such as the Parliament of the World's Religions and meetings of the United Religions Initiative.

== Janki Foundation ==
In December 1997, Janki founded the Janki Foundation for Spirituality in Health Care, a UK registered charity (number 1063908) launched at the Royal College of Physicians in London. The foundation supports the Brahma Kumaris-affiliated Global Hospital and Research Centre near Mount Abu and runs Values in Healthcare: A Spiritual Approach, a values-based educational programme for health professionals which the foundation states is used in more than 30 countries.

== Head Administrator (2007–2020) ==
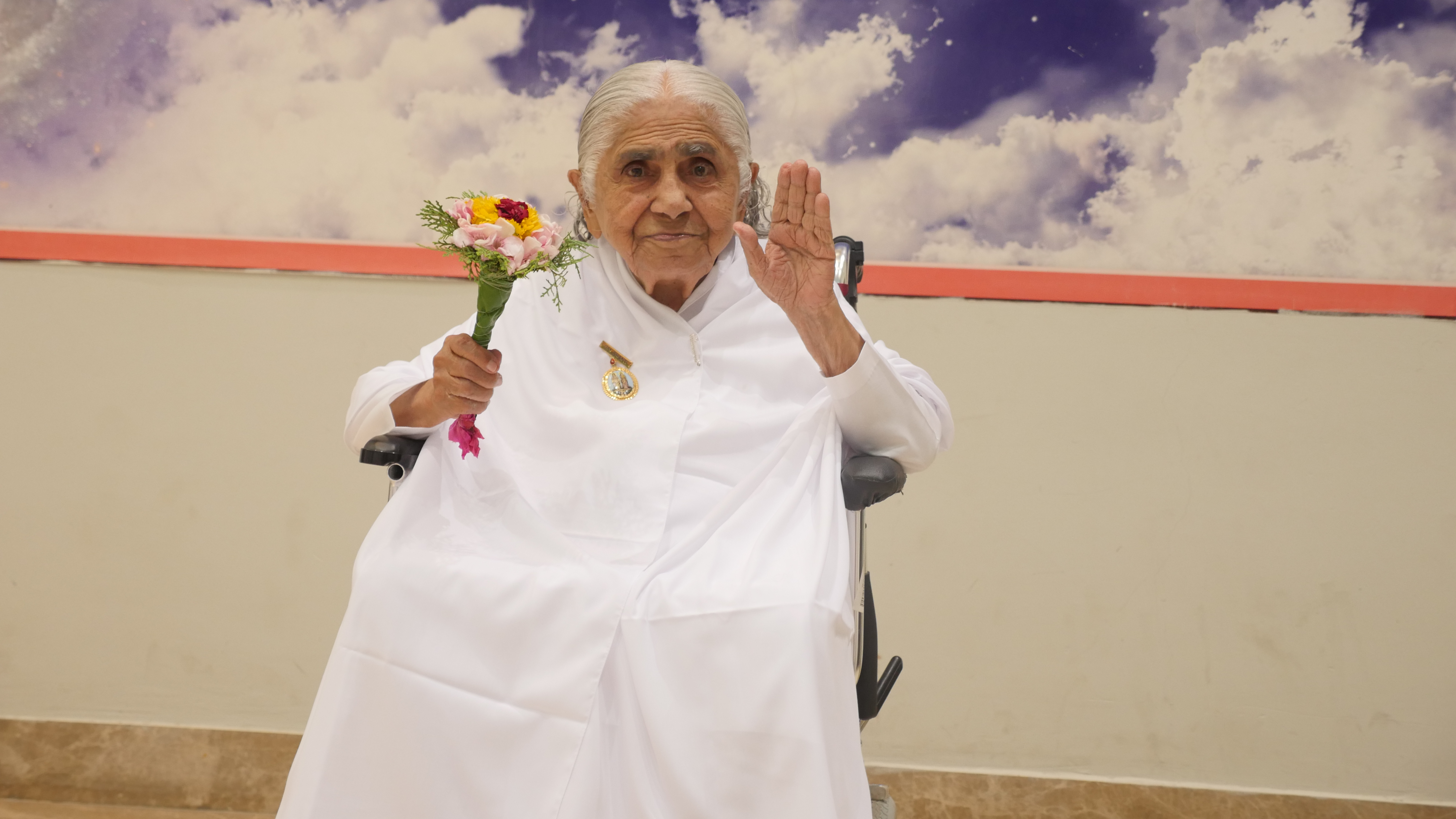
Dadi Janki during a visit to Godlywood Studio on 19 June 2018

On the death of Dadi Prakashmani in August 2007, Janki was appointed Head Administrator of the Brahma Kumaris, the senior leadership position in the organisation. She held the post until her own death in March 2020. Under her administration, the Brahma Kumaris reported a global presence of more than 8,000 centres in over 100 countries, with around two million regular students or members and women serving as administrators of the great majority of centres. The organisation continued to hold General Consultative Status with the United Nations Economic and Social Council (granted in 1983) and to be registered as a non-governmental organisation with the United Nations Department of Global Communications throughout her tenure.

== Awards and recognition ==
In June 2005, Janki was presented with the Courage of Conscience Award by the Peace Abbey, an interfaith peace organisation in Massachusetts, in a ceremony held in Cambridge, Massachusetts and hosted by the Brahma Kumaris Learning Center for Peace in Watertown, Massachusetts; the Peace Abbey citation described her as a "spiritual leader, ethical vegetarian, member of the UN 'Wisdom Keepers'" honoured for "70 years of humanitarian work throughout the world". Other recipients of the same award include the 14th Dalai Lama, Mother Teresa, Mikhail Gorbachev, Robert F. Kennedy and John Lennon.

Janki was appointed a brand ambassador of the Indian government's Swachh Bharat Mission (Clean India Mission) for her advocacy of cleanliness, an appointment several Indian newspapers attributed to Prime Minister Narendra Modi. A 2002 feature in The Times of India reported that scientists at the University of Texas had examined her brain-wave pattern in 1978 and described her as "the most stable mind in the world", a phrase widely repeated in subsequent profiles of her by both Indian newspapers and the Brahma Kumaris organisation itself.

== Death ==
Janki died on 27 March 2020 at a hospital in Mount Abu at the age of 104. Her last rites were performed the same day at the Shantivan campus of the Brahma Kumaris headquarters near Abu Road; because of the COVID-19 lockdown in India, only a small number of mourners were physically present, and the funeral was streamed live on the Brahma Kumaris' Awakening television channel and on YouTube.

President Ram Nath Kovind and Prime Minister Narendra Modi both publicly expressed condolences; Modi described her as having "served society with diligence" and praised her work in empowering women. Tributes were also paid by Lok Sabha Speaker Om Birla, Defence Minister Rajnath Singh, Union Minister Arjun Ram Meghwal, the Chief Ministers of Rajasthan, Chhattisgarh, Gujarat, Madhya Pradesh and Uttar Pradesh, the Congress leader Shashi Tharoor, the BJP leaders L. K. Advani and J. P. Nadda, and the yoga teacher Baba Ramdev.

== Commemorative postage stamp ==
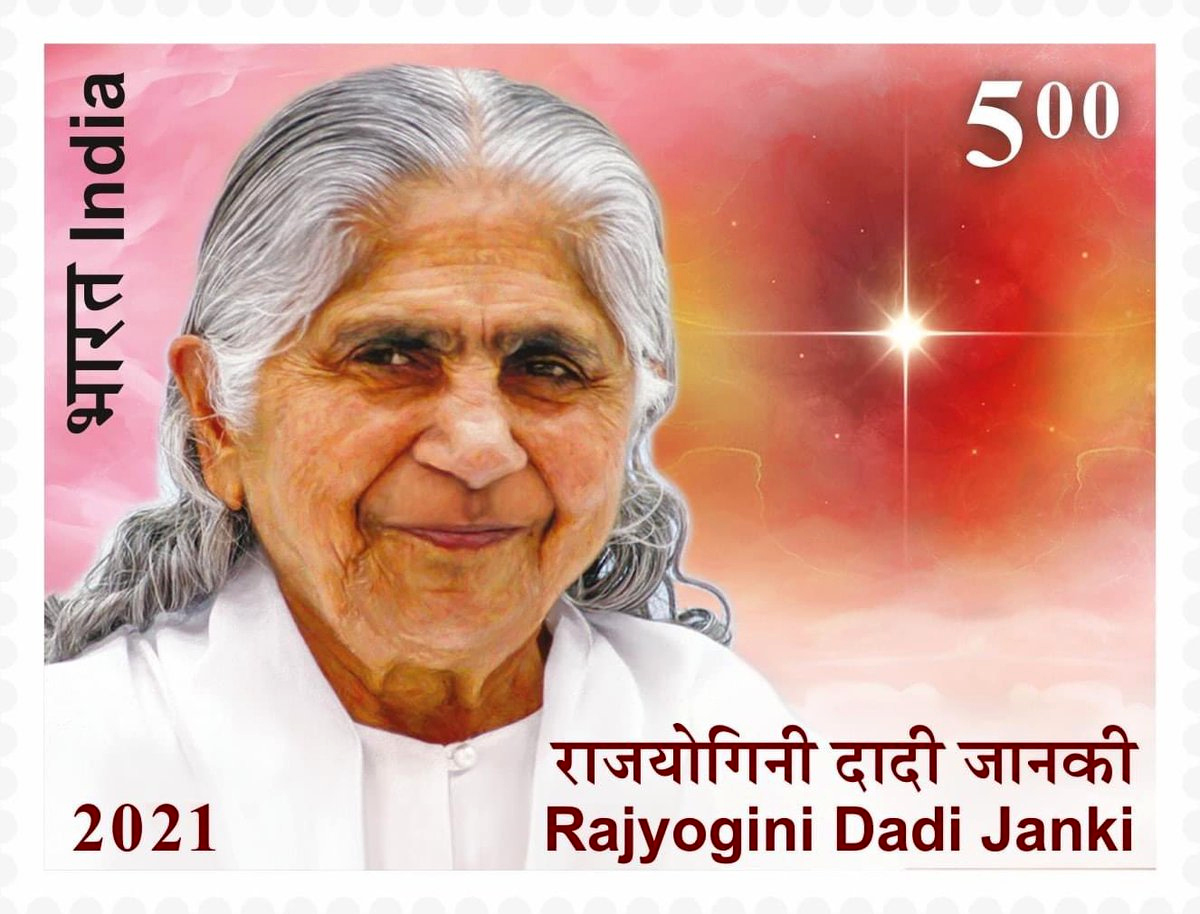
Commemorative ₹5 postage stamp of Dadi Janki, issued by India Post on 12 April 2021 to mark the first anniversary of her death

On 12 April 2021, India Post released a commemorative postage stamp of ₹5 in Janki's memory to mark the first anniversary of her death. The stamp was released in New Delhi by Vice President M. Venkaiah Naidu in the presence of Union Minister Ravi Shankar Prasad and senior Brahma Kumaris members. Naidu described Janki as "one of the foremost spiritual leaders of contemporary times" and praised the Brahma Kumaris as a women-led organisation that demonstrated, in his words, that "spiritual attainments transcend gender-based distinction".

== See also ==
- Brahma Kumaris
- Dadi Prakashmani
- Dadi Gulzar
- Dadi Ratan Mohini
- BK Jayanti
- BK Shivani
- Raja Yoga
