= Dada Lekhraj =

Indian guru (1876-1969)

Lekhraj Khubchand Kirpalani (Brahma Baba)
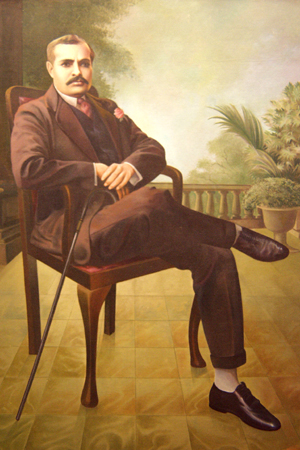

Personal life
- Born: Lekhraj Khubchand Kirpalani; 15 December 1876 Hyderabad, Sindh, India
- Died: 18 January 1969 (aged 92) Mount Abu, Rajasthan, India
- Other names: Prajapita Brahma, Brahma Baba

Religious life
- Religion: Hindu spiritualist, Brahma Kumaris

Lekhraj Khubchand Kirpalani (15 December 1876 – 18 January 1969), also known as Dada Lekhraj, was an Indian guru who was the founder of the Brahma Kumaris. Born of humble beginnings, Lekhraj established his wealth in jewelry before receiving visions of Hindu gods and light, thereafter beginning the Brahma Kumari tradition. Lekhraj is considered a medium of God by the movement’s followers, and his teachings messages channeled through him.

Lekhraj and his movement faced pressure from Hindu communities, organizations, and the government, forcing him to close operations and move to Mount Abu in Rajasthan, where he died and the movement spread to other countries.

== Life ==
Lekhraj Kirpalani was born in a Hyderabad, Sindh in 1876. In his fifties, Kirpalani reported having visions and retired, returning to Hyderabad and turning to spirituality.

=== Om Mandali ===
In 1936, Lekhraj established a spiritual organisation called Om Mandali. Originally a follower of the Vaishnavite Vallabhacharya sect and member of the exogamous Bhaiband community, he is said to have had 12 gurus but started preaching or conducting his own satsangs which, by 1936, had attracted around 300 people from his community, many of them being wealthy. Once a relative reported that a spiritual being (Shiv, the supreme soul) entered in his body and spoke through him. Since then, Lekhraj has been regarded by the Brahma Baba as a medium of God, and as such, speaking channeled messages of high importance within the religious movement's belief system.

In 1937, Lekhraj named some of the members of his satsang as a managing committee, and transferred his fortune to the committee. This committee, known as Om Mandali, was the nucleus of the Brahma Kumaris. Several women joined Om Mandali, and contributed their wealth to the association.

The Sindhi community reacted unfavourably to Lekhraj's movement due to the group's philosophy that advocated women to be less submissive to their husbands, going against that strong cultural aspect at the time in India, and also preached chastity.

Some organisations accused Om Mandali of being a disturber of family's personal matter. Some of the Brahma Kumaris wives were mistreated by their families, and Lekhraj was accused of sorcery and lechery. He was also accused of forming a cult and controlling his community through the art of hypnotism.

To avoid persecution, legal actions and opposition from family members of his followers, Lekhraj moved the group from Hyderabad to Karachi, where they settled in a highly structured ashram. The Bhaibund anti-Om Mandli Committee that had opposed the group in Hyderabad followed them. On 18 January 1939, the mothers of two girls aged 12 and 13 filed an application against Om Mandali, in the Court of the Additional Magistrate in Karachi. The women, from Hyderabad, stated that their daughters were wrongfully being detained at the Om Mandali in Karachi. The court ordered the girls to be sent to their mothers. Om Radhe of the Om Mandali appealed against the decision in the High Court, where the decision was upheld. Later, Hari's parents were persuaded to let their daughter stay at the Om Mandali.

Several Hindus continued their protests against Om Mandali. Some Hindu members of the Sindh Assembly threatened to resign unless the Om Mandali was finally outlawed. Finally, the Sindh Government used the Criminal Law Amendment Act of 1908 to declare the Om Mandali as an unlawful association. Under further pressure from the Hindu leaders in the Assembly, the Government also ordered the Om Mandali to close and vacate its premises.

After the partition of India, the Brahma Kumaris moved to Mount Abu, Rajasthan in India on 5 May 1950.

Lekhraj died on 18 January 1969, and the Brahma Kumaris subsequently expanded to other countries.
