= BK Shivani =

Teacher of the Brahma Kumaris spiritual movement

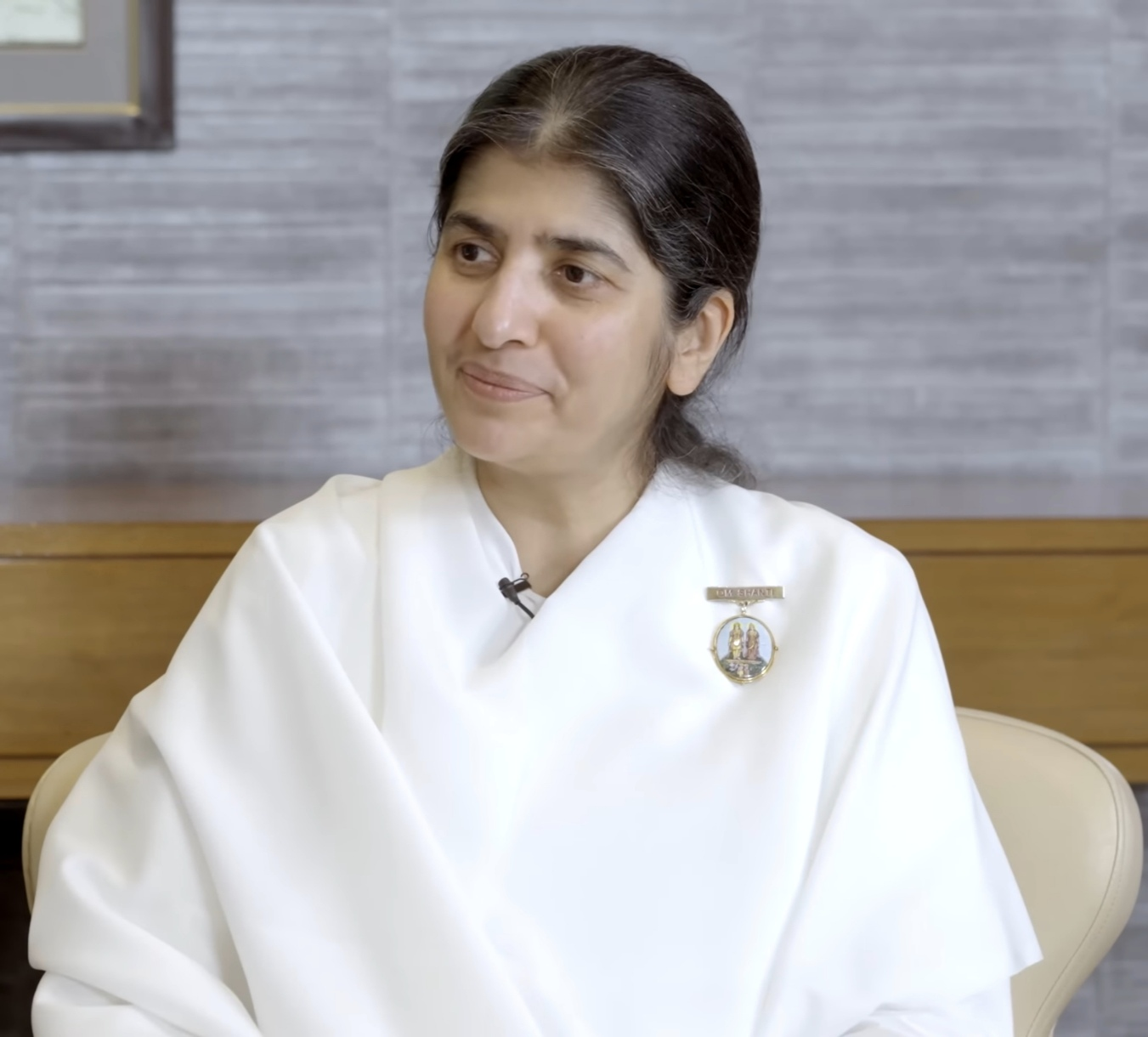
- BK Shivani In 2025
- Born: Shivani Verma; 31 May 1972 (age 54); Pune, Maharashtra, India
- Education: Savitribai Phule Pune University
- Occupations: Author; Philosopher
- Organization: Brahma Kumaris
- Awards: Nari Shakti Puraskar (2019).

YouTube information
- Years active: 2006–present
- Genres: Educational, Philanthropic, Spiritual, Meditation.

Shivani Verma (born 31 May 1972), better known as BK Shivani, is a motivational speaker and spiritual mentor representing the Brahma Kumaris World Spiritual Organization.

== Early life ==
BK Shivani was born on May 31, 1972 in Pune, Maharashtra, India. Her parents began following the Brahma Kumaris when she was a child, and she began to attend meetings in her early 20s.

She completed her undergraduate in electronics engineering at the Savitribai Phule Pune University, and received a master's degree in computer engineering at the Maharashtra Institute of Technology. Initially, she worked backstage at the production of Brahma Kumaris television presentations in Delhi, where senior teachers would record the teachings. In 2007, due to the unavailability of other teachers, she was asked to start answering the viewers' queries herself.

She is married to Vishal Verma with whom she ran a software company until 2004.

== Brahma Kumaris ==
In 2007, a pay-to-broadcast television series Awakening with Brahma Kumaris was produced for the Aastha channel in which co-host Kanu Priya interviewed BK Shivani.

Her TV series of conversations with Suresh Oberoi was adapted into the 2015 book Happiness Unlimited: Awakening With Brahma Kumaris.

BK Shivani travels in India and abroad, appearing at charitable events ranging from the promotion of organ donation to parenting programs, as well as Brahma Kumaris events. In 2017 she was named as a goodwill ambassador of the World Psychiatric Association.

== Awards and recognitions ==
- Women of the Decade Achievers Award by ASSOCHAM Ladies League in 2014.
- Nari Shakti Award in 2019.
