= Mount Abu Wildlife Sanctuary =

Protected area in Rajasthan, India

- IUCN category IV (habitat/species management area)
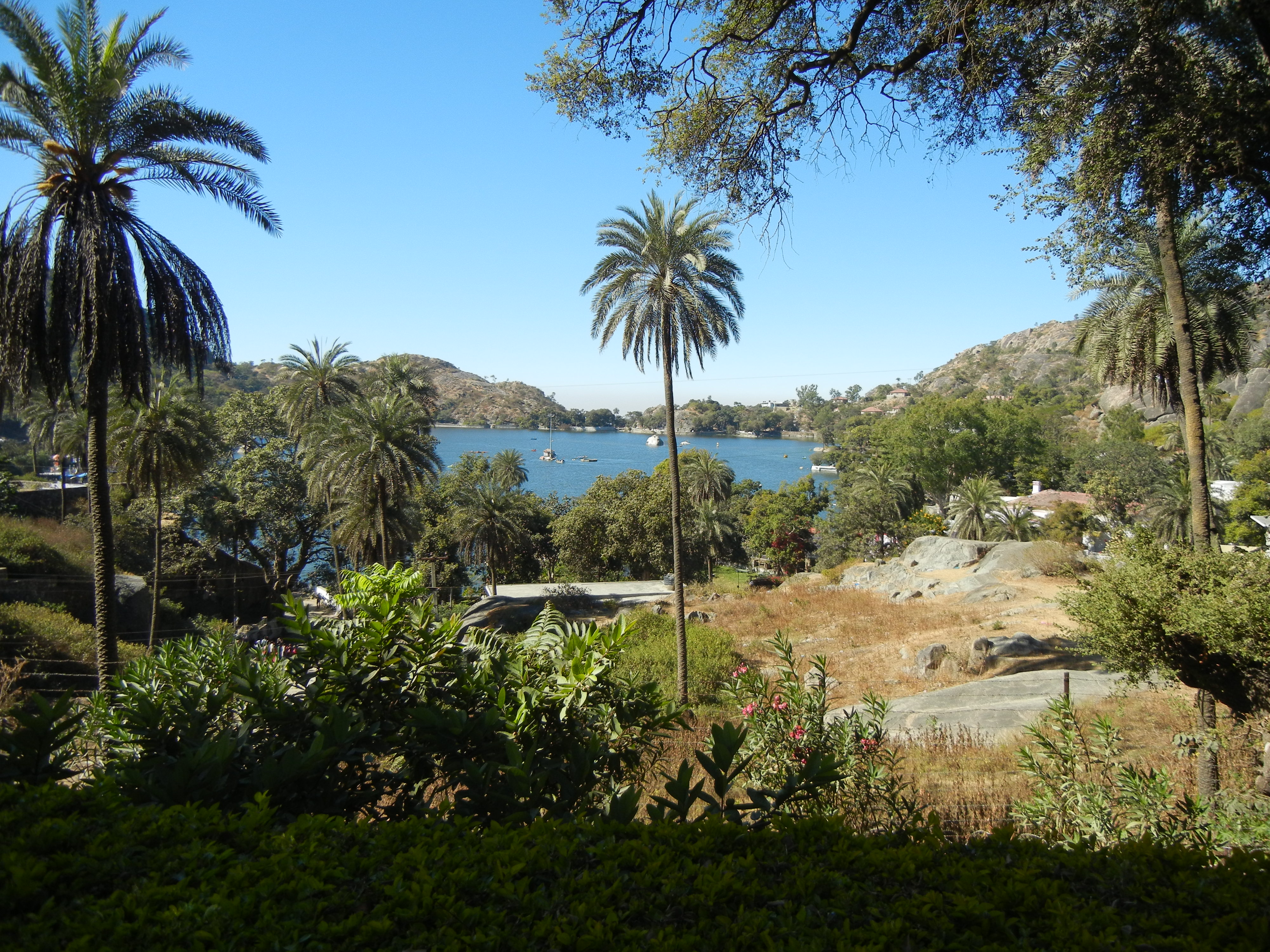

- Location within Rajasthan Location within India
- Interactive map of Mount Abu Wildlife Sanctuary
- Location: Rajasthan, India
- Nearest city: Mount Abu
- Coordinates: 24°37′39″N 72°45′58″E
- Area: 288 km^{2} (111 sq mi)
- Established: 1960
- Visitors: NA (in NA)
- Governing body: Ministry of Environment and Forests, Government of India

Mount Abu Wildlife Sanctuary is located in the Aravalli Range, one of the oldest mountain ranges in India. It was declared a wildlife sanctuary in 1980. The eco-sensitive zone around the sanctuary was notified on 11 Nov 2020.

== Geography ==
Mount Abu Wildlife Sanctuary spreads out into a plateau which is about 19 km (12 mi) long and 6 km (3.7 mi) wide. In altitude, it ranges from 300 to 1,722 m (984 to 5,650 ft) at Guru Shikhar, the highest peak in Rajasthan. The rocks are igneous and due to the weathering effect of wind and water, large cavities are common in them.

The sanctuary is in the Khathiar-Gir dry deciduous forests ecoregion.

== Flora ==
Mount Abu Wildlife Sanctuary is very rich in floral biodiversity starting from xenomorphic sub-tropical thorn forests in the foot hills to sub-tropical evergreen forests along Priyen water courses and valleys at higher elevations. There are about 112 plant families with 449 genera and 820 species. Of these, 663 species are dicots while 157 species are monocots. About 81 species of trees, 89 species of shrubs, 28 species of climbers and 17 species of tuberous plants of medicinal importance have been identified in this sanctuary. The rare and endemic plants reported are Dicliptera abuensis Blatt, Carvia colloseeys, Ischaemun kingie, Convolvulus blateri and Ceropegia bulbosa. Some of the native plant species Anogeisus sericea var sericea, Begonia trichocarpa, Crotolaria filipe, Indigofera constricta.

Mount Abu Wildlife Sanctuary is the only place in Rajasthan that harbours several orchid species. The place is also rich in bryophytes and algae. Three rose species and 16 fern species, some of which are quite rare have also been reported from here. The south-west part of the sanctuary is rich in bamboo forests.

== Fauna ==
Among the fauna living in Mount Abu Wildlife Sanctuary are Indian leopard, sloth bear, Sambar deer, wild boar and chinkara. The jungle cat, small Indian civet, Indian wolf, striped hyena, golden jackal, Indian fox, gray langur, Indian pangolin, Indian grey mongoose, Indian hare, Indian crested porcupine and Indian hedgehog have also been recorded. The Asiatic lion was last recorded in 1872, and the Bengal tiger in 1970.

More than 250 species of birds have been recorded including the grey jungle fowl. The rare green avadavat is common here. A varied ecosystem, including forests, rocky cliffs, grasslands, scrublands and seasonal water bodies support a wide variety of species. The Indian peafowl, grey partridge, red junglefowl, woodpecker, drongos, barbet, vultures, eagles, and bulbuls are some resident species.

== See also ==
- Arid Forest Research Institute (AFRI)
