= TOI-4603 b =

Exoplanet orbiting the star HD 245134

Discovery
- Discovered by: Khandelwal et al.
- Discovery site: India
- Discovery date: 2023
- Detection method: Transit

Orbital characteristics
- Semi-major axis: 0.0888±0.001 AU
- Eccentricity: 0.325±0.02
- Orbital period (sidereal): 7.246 d
- Inclination: 80.21°
- Star: HD 245134 (TOI-4603)

Physical characteristics
- Mean radius: 1.042+0.035 −0.038 R_{J}
- Mass: 12.89+0.57 −0.58 M_{J}
- Mean density: 14.1+1.6 −1.7 g/cm^{3}
- Temperature: 1,677±24 K (1404 °C)

TOI-4603 b is a gas giant exoplanet orbiting HD 245134, a F-type subgiant star located 731 light-years away, in the constellation of Taurus. (Note: Obtained with a right ascension of 05 ^{h} 35^{m} 27.82^{s} and a declination of +21° 17′ 39.6″ on this website.) It orbits its host star at a distance of 0.0888 astronomical units (13,280,000 km), completing one orbit every 7 days around it. With a density of 14.1 g/cm^{3} (about 2.5 times that of Earth), it is one of the densest exoplanets known. The planet is just 4% larger than Jupiter, but is 12.9 times more massive, being located in the mass limit between planets and brown dwarfs.

== Physical characteristics ==
TOI-4603 b is similar to the planet Jupiter in size, being only 4% larger. Radial velocity measurements calculated the planet's mass to be 12.89+0.58
−0.57 M_{J} meaning that the object is close to the mass limit between planets and brown dwarfs, which is usually set at 13 M_{J}. Its equilibrium temperature is calculated at 1,677 K (1,404 °C).

=== High density ===
Combining the radius and mass, the density of TOI-4603 b is calculated to be 14.1+1.6
−1.7 g/cm³, about 2.5 times greater than Earth's, (Note: The density of Earth is 5.513 g/cm³.) making it one of the densest exoplanets known to date, and one of the most massive and dense transiting exoplanets known.

== Orbital characteristics ==
TOI-4603 b orbits its star at a distance of 0.0888 astronomical units (13,280,000 km), and completes one orbit every 7 days and 6 hours. The orbit of TOI-4603 b is very elliptical, having an orbital eccentricity of 0.325, which indicates that the planet is undergoing tidal migration due to a gravitational interaction with another planet. Kervella et al. (2019) found that a brown dwarf with a mass of 20.5 M_{J} is orbiting the system at a distance of around 1.8 AU, which may be influencing TOI-4603 b's orbit.

A similar object is a planet called HATS-70b. It is less dense than TOI-4603 b, but similarly close to its star, and also shows signs of orbital migration.

== Discovery ==
NASA's Transiting Exoplanet Survey Satellite observed the host star TOI-4603 between September 16, 2021, and December 2, 2021. Afterwards, the group of astronomers led by Akanksha Khandelwal of the Physical Research Laboratory (PRL) in India, reported that a transit signal had been identified in the light curve of the star. Radial velocity measurements taken with the PARAS and TRES (Note: Not to be confused with Trans-Atlantic Exoplanet Survey, that is no longer in use.) spectrographs confirmed the transit signal to be an exoplanet orbiting the star.

It was the third exoplanet discovered by Indian astronomers, using the PARAS spectrograph and the PRL 1.2 m telescope. The discovery was announced in 2023.

== Host star ==
HD 245134
Observation data Epoch J2000 Equinox ICRS
- Constellation: Taurus
- Right ascension: 05^{h} 35^{m} 27.82281^{s}
- Declination: +21° 17′ 39.6246″
- Apparent magnitude (V): 9.2

Characteristics
- Evolutionary stage: Subgiant
- Spectral type: F

Astrometry
Radial velocity (R_{v})	-3.29 km/s
Proper motion (μ)	RA: +0.102 mas/yr Dec.: −22.866 mas/yr
Parallax (π)	4.4613±0.0195 mas
Distance	735.596+8.098 −7.928 ly (225.643+2.484 −2.432 pc)

Details
Mass	1.765±0.061 M_{☉}
Radius	2.738+0.061 −0.050 R_{☉}
Luminosity	10.4 L_{☉}
Surface gravity (log g)	3.94±0.1 cgs
Temperature	6,264+95 −94 K
Metallicity [Fe/H]	0.342+0.039 −0.040 dex
Rotational velocity (v sin i)	23.18±0.37 km/s
Age	1.64+0.30 −0.24 Gyr

Other designations
- TOI-4603, 2MASS J05352782+2117396, AG+21 537, AGKR 4971, BD+21 897, Gaia DR1 3402980516507429888, Gaia DR2 3402980516507429888, Gaia DR3 3402980516507429888, GSC 01309-01102, HIC 26250, HIP 26250, PPM 94530, SAO 77288, TIC 437856897, TYC 1309-1102-1, YZ 21 1805

Database references
SIMBAD	data

HD 245134 (TOI-4603) is a F-type subgiant located 736 light-years away in the constellation of Taurus. It is well suited for the study of the Rossiter–McLaughlin effect and helpful for measuring the projected stellar obliquity of planets. The star has an apparent magnitude of 9.2, being too faint to be seen with the naked eye. It is a metal-rich star, with abundance of iron 2.2 times greater than that of the Sun.

=== Orbital companions ===
HD 245134 is orbited by an exoplanet (TOI-4603 b), and by a 20.5 M_{J} brown dwarf star at a distance of 1.8 AU from the star.
