= Winter Festival at Mount Abu, Rajasthan =

Festivals in Rajasthan

- Genre: Cultural festival
- Dates: 29–31 December annually
- Locations: Mount Abu, Rajasthan, India
- Participants: Folk artists from Rajasthan, Haryana, Punjab, Madhya Pradesh, Gujarat
- Patrons: Rajasthan Tourism Development Corporation, Municipal Board of Mount Abu

The Winter Festival at Mount Abu, Rajasthan is held annually from 29–31 December. The festival is jointly organised by the Rajasthan Tourism Development Corporation and the Municipal Board of Mount Abu.

Mount Abu, situated at an altitude of 1,219 m above sea level, is the only hill station in Rajasthan.

The Winter Festival features traditional dancing, concerts, fairs, and a fireworks display; participants include folk artists from majorly Rajasthan and also from Haryana, Punjab, Madhya Pradesh and Gujarat. The festival opens with a procession to Nakki Lake.

Other attractions of the festival include stage performance of Sufi Kathak and folk dances such as Daph, Ghoomar and Gair, and entertainments such as kite-flying, hot air ballooning, cricket, gilli danda, poetry reading and music performances.
