= Mount Abu InfraRed Observatory =

Mount Abu Observatory
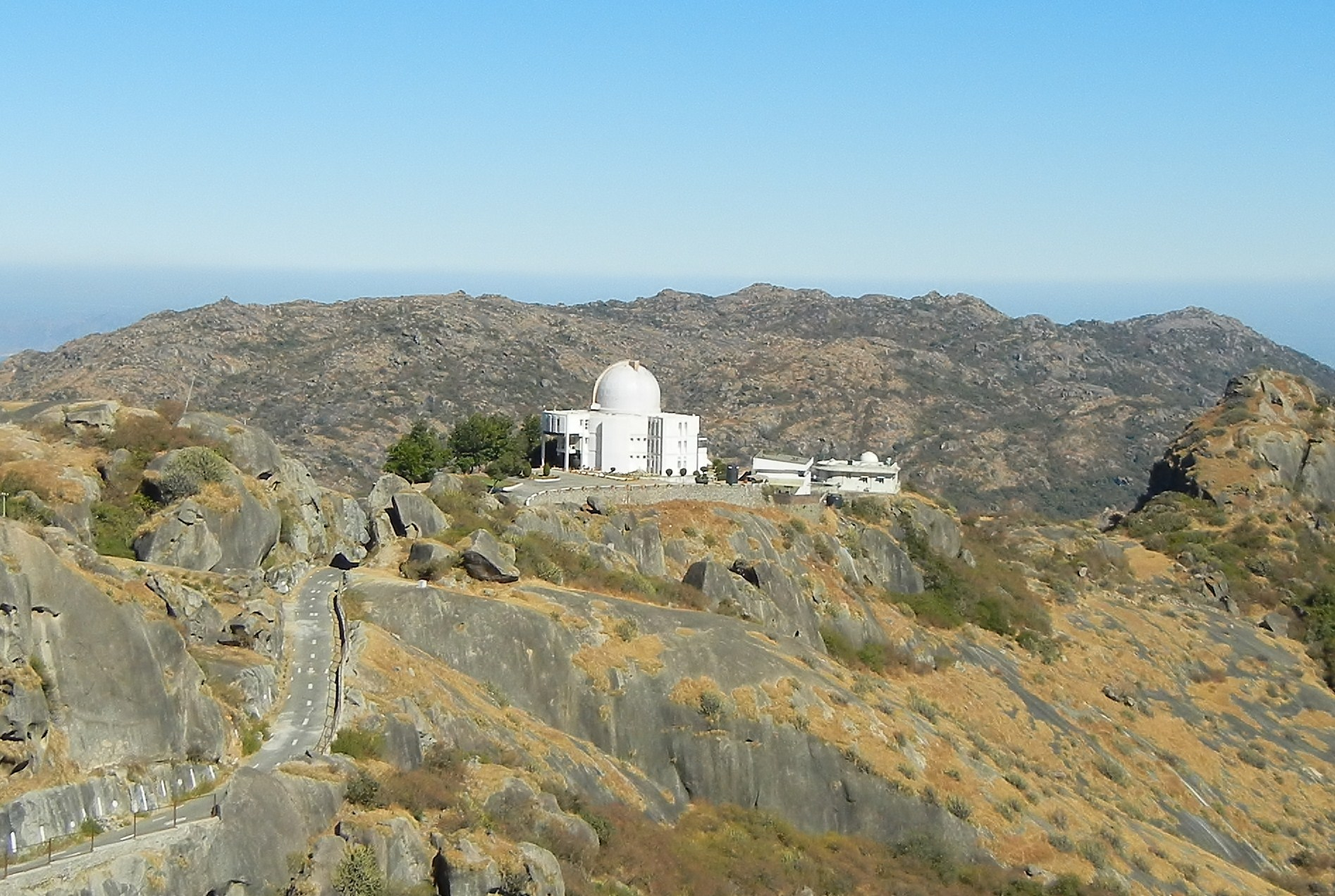
- Observatory as seen from Guru Shikhar.
- Alternative names: Mount Abu InfraRed Observatory
- Organization: Physical Research Laboratory
- Location: Sirohi district, Jodhpur division, Rajasthan, India
- Coordinates: 24°39′17.34″N 72°46′45.18″E
- Altitude: 1,680 m (5,510 ft)
- Established: 1990
- Website: www.prl.res.in/~miro/
- Telescopes: PRL Advanced Radial-velocity All-sky Search
- Related media on Commons

The Mount Abu InfraRed Observatory (MIRO) is an astronomical observatory located near Mount Abu in the state of Rajasthan, India. The observatory is at an altitude of 1680 metres and is adjacent to Guru Shikhar, the highest peak of the Aravalli Range. The observatory hosts a 1.2-metre infrared telescope. It is the first major facility in India specifically designed for ground-based, infrared observations of celestial objects. Further, the low amount of precipitable water vapour (1–2 mm during winter) at Guru Shikhar makes it a good site for infrared observations. The site has been found to be good (about 150 cloud free nights per year) for astronomical observations.

== Location ==
The Observatory is located near Guru Shikhar, the highest peak of the Aravalli Range at an altitude of 1680 metres. Mount Abu is about 28 km from the Abu Road railway station and about 240 km from Ahmedabad. MIRO is operated by the Astronomy & Astrophysics Division of the Physical Research Laboratory, Ahmedabad.

== Observation ==
Mount Abu has about 200 cloud-free nights of which 150 nights a year can be used for photometric observations. It has a typical seeing of ~1.2 arcsec. Observations are closed during Indian monsoon period (Late June to mid-September).

== Facilities ==
Mount Abu Observatory is equipped with a 1.2m Infrared Telescope along with the following back-end instruments: NICMOS Infrared Camera and Spectrograph, Imaging Fabry-Perot Spectrometer, large format optical CCDs, Optical Imaging Polarimeter and Fibre-linked Grating Spectrograph. A new high resolution optical spectrometer, PRL Advanced Radial-velocity All-sky Search (PARAS) to detect extrasolar planets using the radial velocity technique began observation in April 2012.

In addition to these, a 50 cm telescope, Automated Telescope for Variability Study (ATVS), is now functional to monitor variable sources, e.g. AGNs, variable stars, Comets etc. and another 43 cm telescope for ground-based photometry. MIRO has its own Aluminizing plant for polishing of the telescope mirrors, a liquid nitrogen plant for providing liquid nitrogen to cool the IR detectors to reduce thermal noise.

A new facility, created by LEOS, ISRO will become operational. This facility will have a one-meter diameter telescope with sophisticated optics and back-end instruments assembled by the Laboratory for Electro-Optics Systems (LEOS), Bengaluru. The new facility, known as the Electro-Optical Deep Space Surveillance (EODSS) system, will track space debris, mainly consisting of inactive satellites, electronic parts of instruments, leftovers from rocket launch and other such junk in space.

== See also ==
- List of astronomical observatories
