= Nakki Lake =

Lake in Rajasthan, India

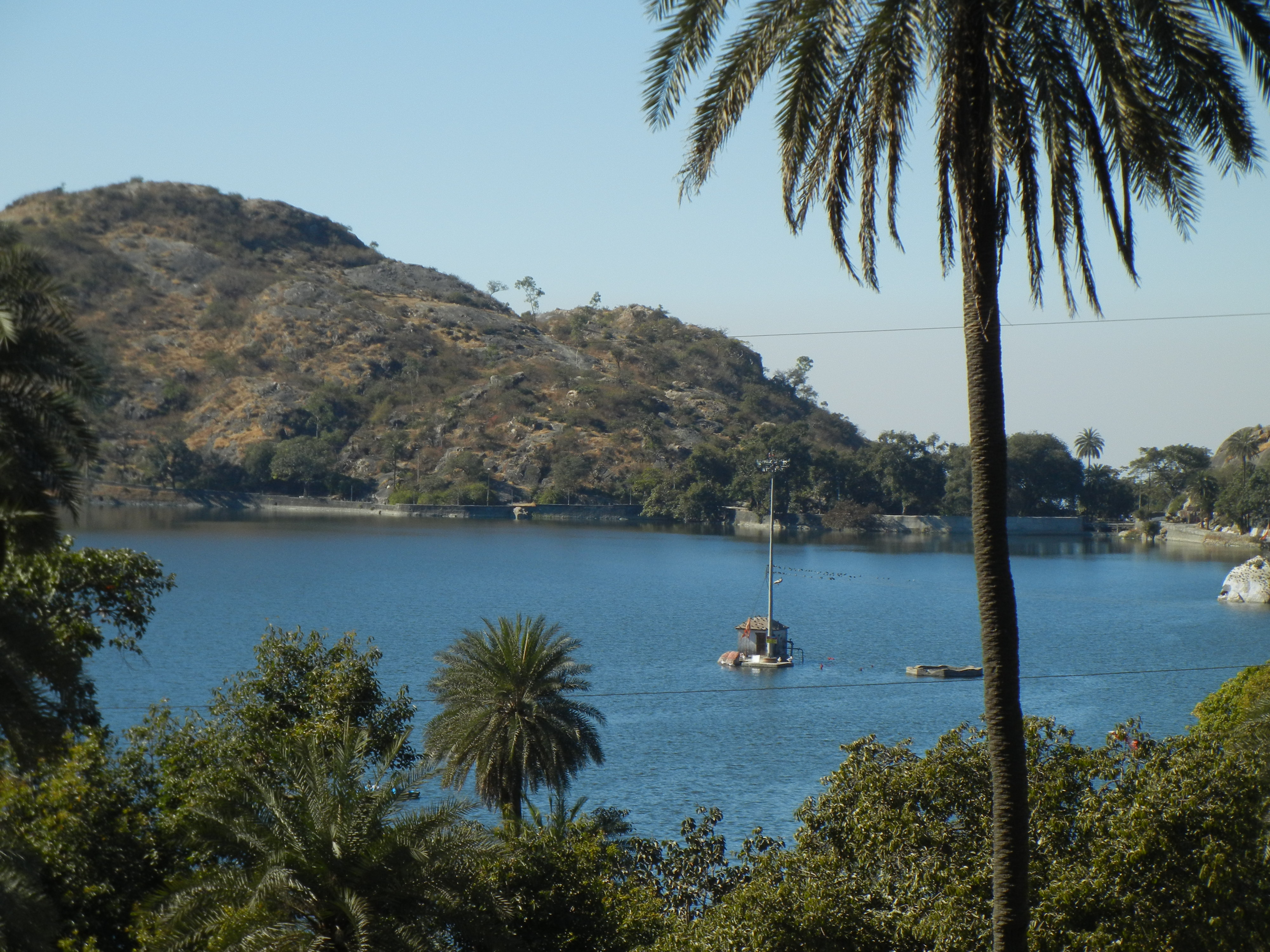

- Location within Rajasthan
- Interactive map of Nakki Lake
- Location: Mount Abu, Rajasthan
- Coordinates: 24.596140°N 72.703066°E
- Basin countries: India
- Max. depth: 114 ft (35 m)

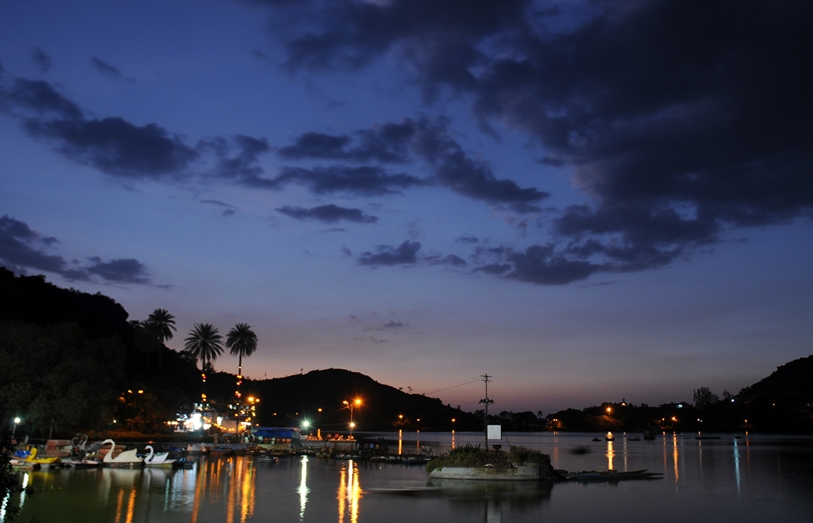
Nakki Lake after sunset

Nakki Lake is a lake situated in the Indian hill station of Mount Abu in Aravalli range.

== History ==
It is believed to be a very ancient sacred Lake, according to the Hindu legend. It is called so because it is believed to be dug out from Nails (Nakh). One story is of dug by Gods to live in, for protection against the Bashkali rakshash (a wicked demon). While other is of Rasiya Balam (a sculptor of Dilwara Jain temple), who dug the lake, as the King announced that whoever would dig the lake within one night, would get to marry his daughter. But later, his Queen refused and Rasiya Balam couldn't marry the Princess. Temple of Rasiya Balam and Kunwari Kanya (princess)'s is located behind the Dilwara Jain temple.

== Geography ==
The lake is in length of about a half mile and in width about of a quarter of mile and 2000 to 3000 mt. deep towards the dam on the west. It is an important tourist attraction of Mount Abu. There is the Toad Rock on a hill near the lake. Toad rock is so called as it looks like a toad about to jump into the lake, from the side of the rock facing the lake. There are two ways to go up and down the rock; to climb the rocky hill side or to use the steps leading down to Nakki Lake. By the side of the lake there is a path leading to Sunset Point. It is forbidden to climb to Sunset Point due to wild animals such as bears and leopards roaming around the path to Sunset Point. Raghunath Temple and Maharaja Jaipur Palace are also on hills near the Lake. Boating in the lake and horse rides around the lake are available.

Mahatma Gandhi's ashes were immersed in this holy lake on 12 February 1948 and Gandhi Ghat was constructed.

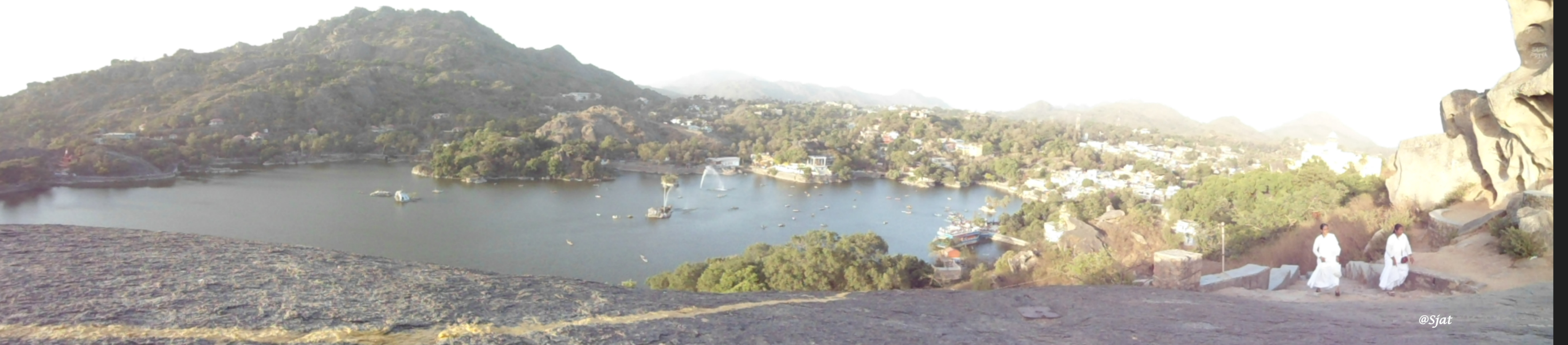
Panoramic view of Lake
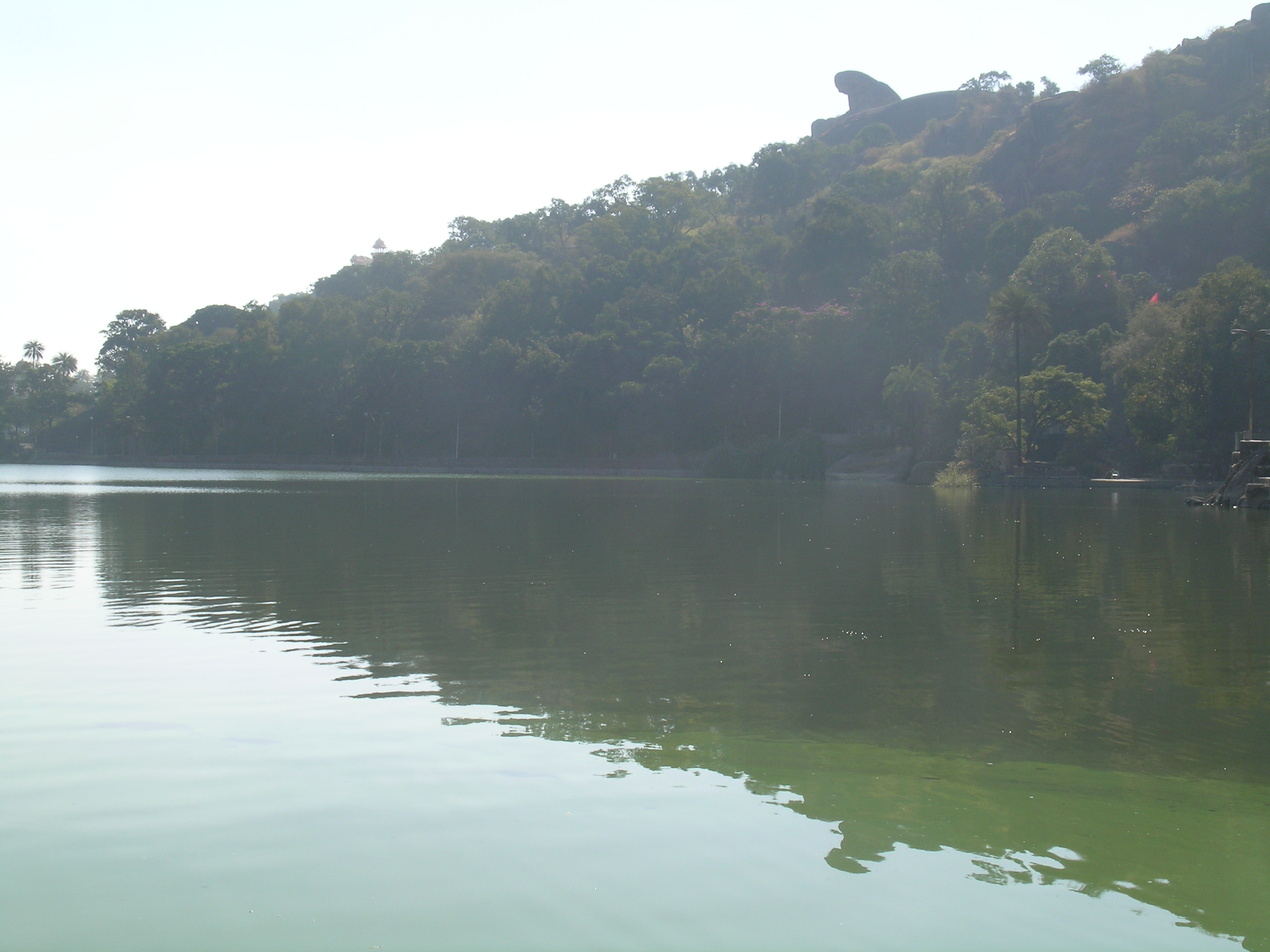
Toad rock and the Maharaja's palace can be seen in the background of the Nakki Lake.

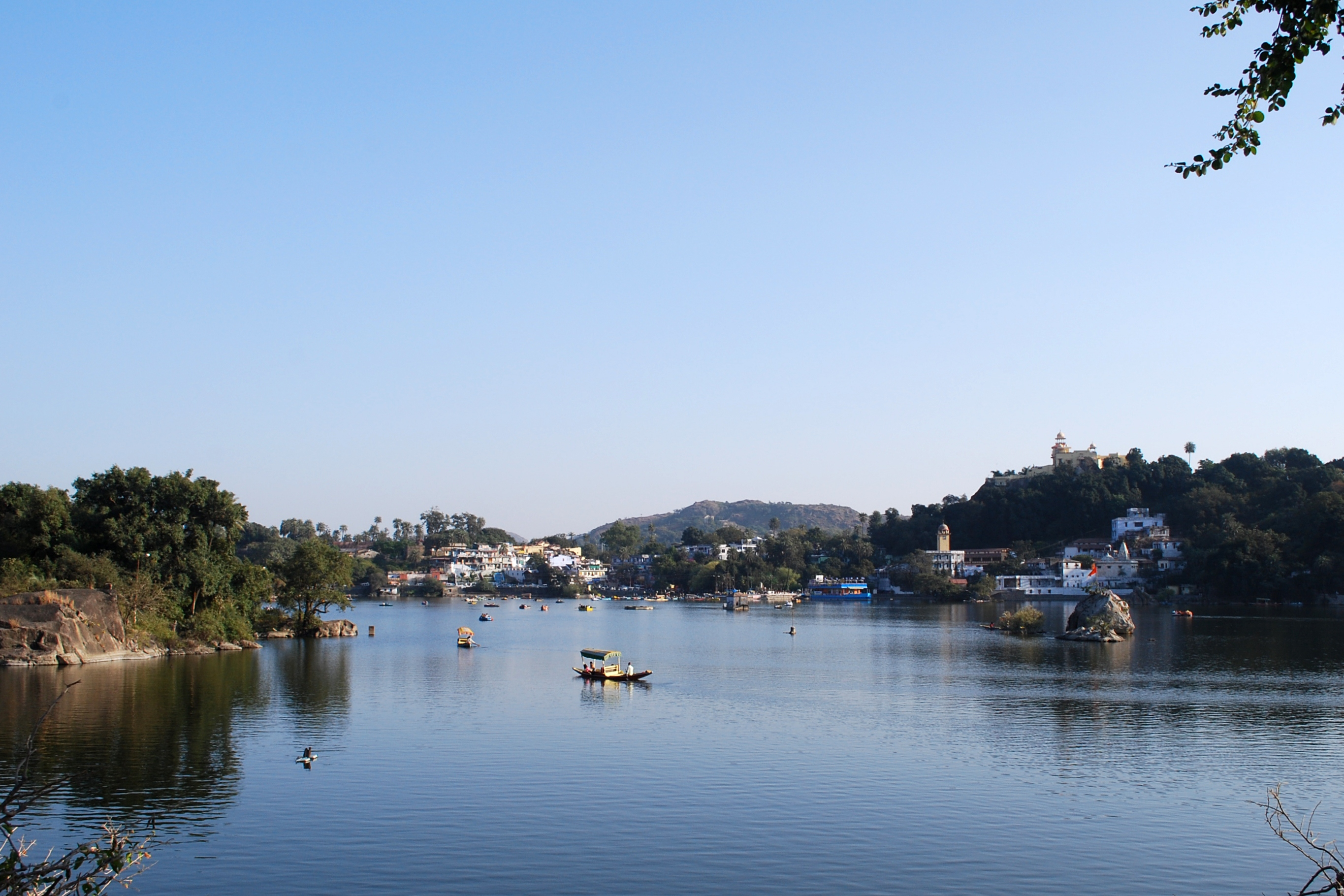
Boating facility for Tourists.

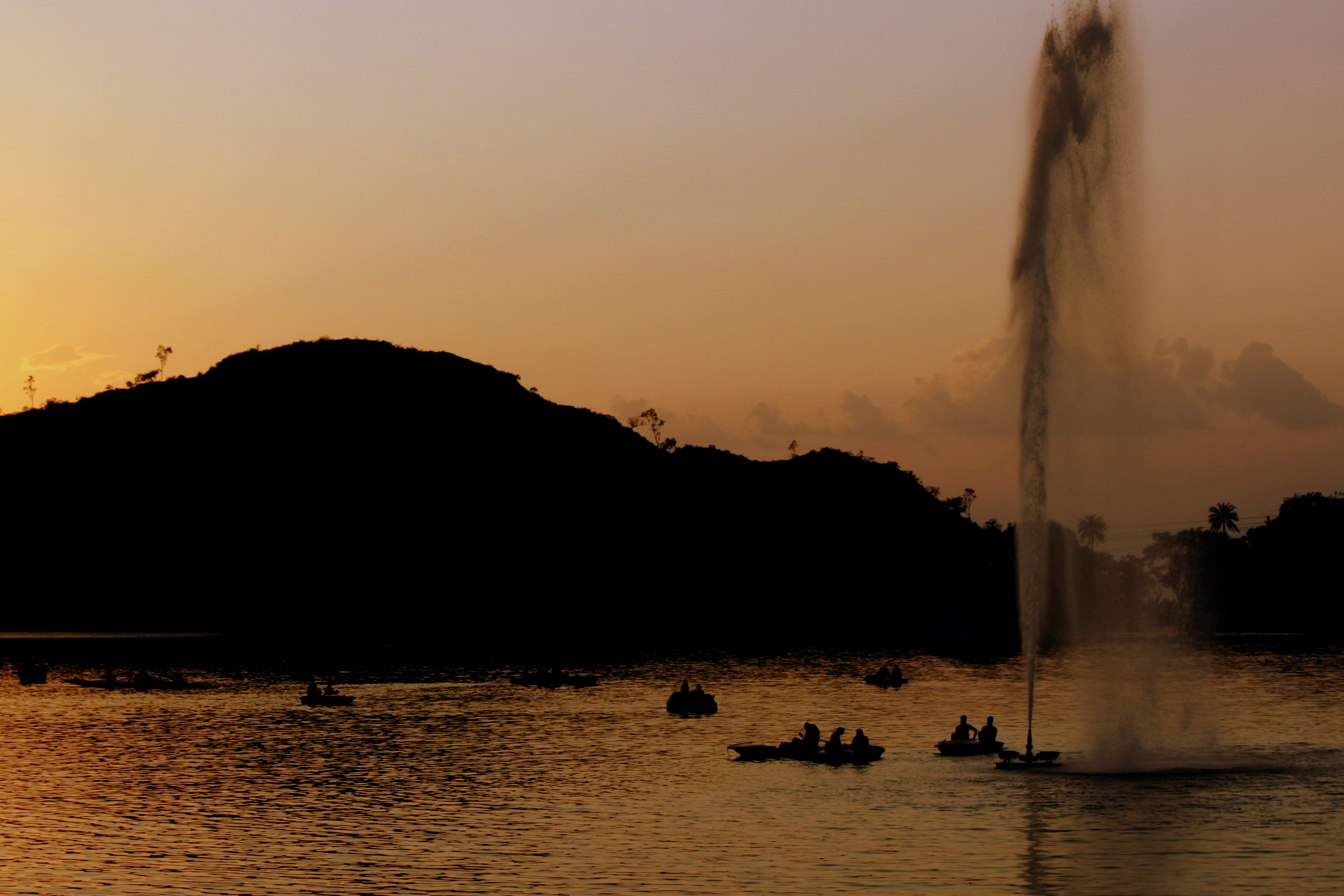
Nakki Lake fountains in the evening.

== In Art and Literature ==
In Fisher's Drawing Room Scrap Book, 1839 is a poetical illustration by Letitia Elizabeth Landon to an engraving of a painting by H. Melville Hindoo Temples on the Mountain-Lake of Aboo.

== List of lakes in India ==
- List of lakes in India
