= PRL Advanced Radial-velocity All-sky Search =

PRL Advanced Radial-velocity Abu-sky Search, abbreviated PARAS, is a ground-based extrasolar planet search device. Based at 1.2m telescope is located at Mt. Abu, India. The project is funded by Physical Research Laboratory, India. The spectrograph works at a resolution of 67000. With the help of simultaneous calibration technique, PARAS has achieved an RV accuracy of 1.3 m/s for bright, quiet, sun-like stars. Thorium-Argon lamp is used for calibration. New calibration techniques are also being explored by the project team. PARAS can detect planet in the habitable zone around M-type stars.
