= Achalgarh Fort =

Fort in Mount Abu, Rajasthan, India

- Sirohi district, Rajasthan
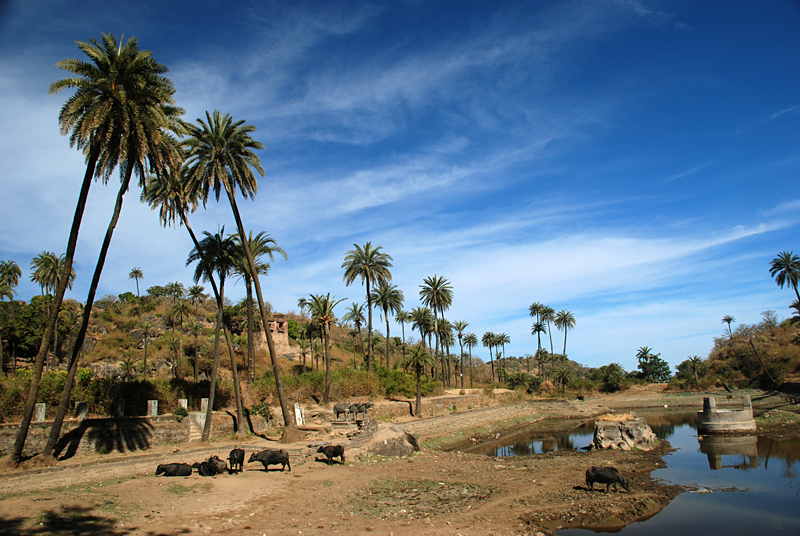
- Achalgarh Fort bastions

Site information
- Type: Hill fort
- Owner: Government of India
- Controlled by: Mewar
- Open to the public: Yes
- Condition: Dilapidated

Location
- Shown within Rajasthan
- Coordinates: 24°36′56″N 72°46′7″E

Site history
- Built: 1452
- Materials: Stone

Achalgarh is a fort situated about 11 kilometres (6.8 mi) north of Mount Abu, a hill station in Rajasthan, India. The fort was originally built by the Paramara dynasty rulers and later reconstructed, renovated and named as Achalgarh by Maharana Kumbha in 1452 CE, one of the 32 forts built during his reign.

The fort is in a dilapidated condition now. The first gate of the fort is known as Hanumanpol, which served as the entrance to the lower fort. It comprises two towers built of large blocks of grey granite. After some ascent, stands Champapol, the second gate of the fort, which served as the entrance to the inner fort.

There are some features of historical and religious importance in and around the fort. Achaleshwar Mahadev Temple is just outside the fort; the toe of Shiva is worshipped there and a brass Nandi is also located there. Near the temple there are three stone buffaloes standing around a pond. There are Jain temples in the fort. These were built in 1513.
