= Achaleshwar Mahadev Temple =

Coordinates: 24.615589°N 72.7665303°E

- अचलेश्वर महादेव मन्दिर

Religion
- Affiliation: Hinduism
- Deity: Shiva

Location
- Location: Achalgarh Fort, Abu Road, Sirohi district, Rajasthan, India
- Interactive map of Achaleshwar Mahadev Temple

Architecture
- Creator: Paramara dynasty

The Achaleshwar Mahadev Temple (Devanagari: अचलेश्वर महादेव मन्दिर, Acaleśavara Mahādeva Mandir) is a Shiva temple situated just outside the Achalgarh Fort, located in the Abu Road tehsil of Sirohi district, in the western Indian state of Rajasthan. The temple is believed to have been constructed sometime in the 9th century AD, and by the Paramara dynasty, which is also credited with having constructed the original structure of the Achalgarh Fort, later reconstructed, renovated and named as Achalgarh by Maharana Kumbha in 1452 CE.

== Etymology ==
The word 'Achaleshwar' is a word displaying Sanskritic sandhi and is derived from the Sanskrit words 'Achal' meaning immovable, and 'Ishwar' meaning 'Lord Shiva', while the word 'Mahadeva', again formed by the rules of sandhi, means the great (maha) god (deva), and is an epithet of Shiva, the deity to whom the temple is dedicated.

== Shrines ==
The temple stands in the centre of an enclosure on the southern side of the Agnikund, wherein there are several small shrines dedicated to Shiva's mount, Nandi. Of particular interest and importance is a four tonne statue of Nandi made of panchadhatu, the alloy used for making idols, which is composed of five metals – gold, silver, copper, brass and zinc. The inscription is dated Chaitra S. 8, 1464 VS (1407 CE). Next to the Nandi statue is the brass image of the famous 16th century Charan poet and warrior, Dursaji Arha. The inscription on the brass statue of Dursaji Arha is dated Baisakh S. 5, 1686 VS (1629 CE).

== Legend ==
According to local legend, the temple is built around a toe print of Shiva. Shiva is worshipped, like at most Shiva temples, in the form of a Shiva linga, a nuclear reactor dome shape alike structure representing Shiva and the power of creation, seated on top of a surface, an abstract representation of Shakti. The shiva linga at this temple is a naturally occurring stone structure.

According to a popular local legend, the statue of Nandi is credited with protecting the temple from an attack of Muslim invaders by releasing innumerable bumble bees onto the attackers thereby saving the temple from destruction. The temple also has several other idols, sculpted from sphatik, a quartz stone, which appears opaque in natural light but becomes crystal-like translucent when a light is held against it.

Within the temple is a pit which is believed by the locals to be a doorway to Naraka, the netherworld. Close to the temple is a pond with three large stone buffalo statues. These buffaloes are believed to be representative of demons who, according to legend, flocked to the watering hole, which was said to be filled with ghee, until they were shot dead by the king, Raja Adi Pal.

== Repairs and Renovation ==
The temple was the victim of shoddy repair and renovation work. A thick layer of lime covered the intricate and fine filigree work and marble carvings of the temple interiors, for which the artisans of Rajasthan were famous, which resulted in the beauty of the temple being hidden and reducing it to an insignificant structure. However, this was a boon in disguise, for it protected the fine marble from damage over the years. In 1979, the crown prince of the Sirohi princely state chanced upon a piece of marble exposed under the lime, and that started the renovation work of the temple under the aegis of the crown prince. Skilled artisans began the work to restore the temple to its past glory by carefully removing the lime to reveal the underlying marble beauty. Pillars and columns were carefully removed, reworked on, and then set back in correctly.

During the renovations to the garbhagriha, Sanctum Santorum of the temple, it was revealed that it wasn't built of bricks with marble slabs on top, but of huge blocks of marble. A path was also unearthed, that went around the Sanctum Santorum, for the purpose of parikrama, the Hindu custom of circumambulation. Sculptures of the goddess Chamunda were found on two alcoves, the rear one and the one on the left. These were smeared with the auspicious red vermillion, indicating that these were regularly worshipped in the days before the repair work was undertaken.
