= Abu Raj =

Hill station in Rajasthan, India

Abu Raj आबू राज Mount Abu
- Hill station
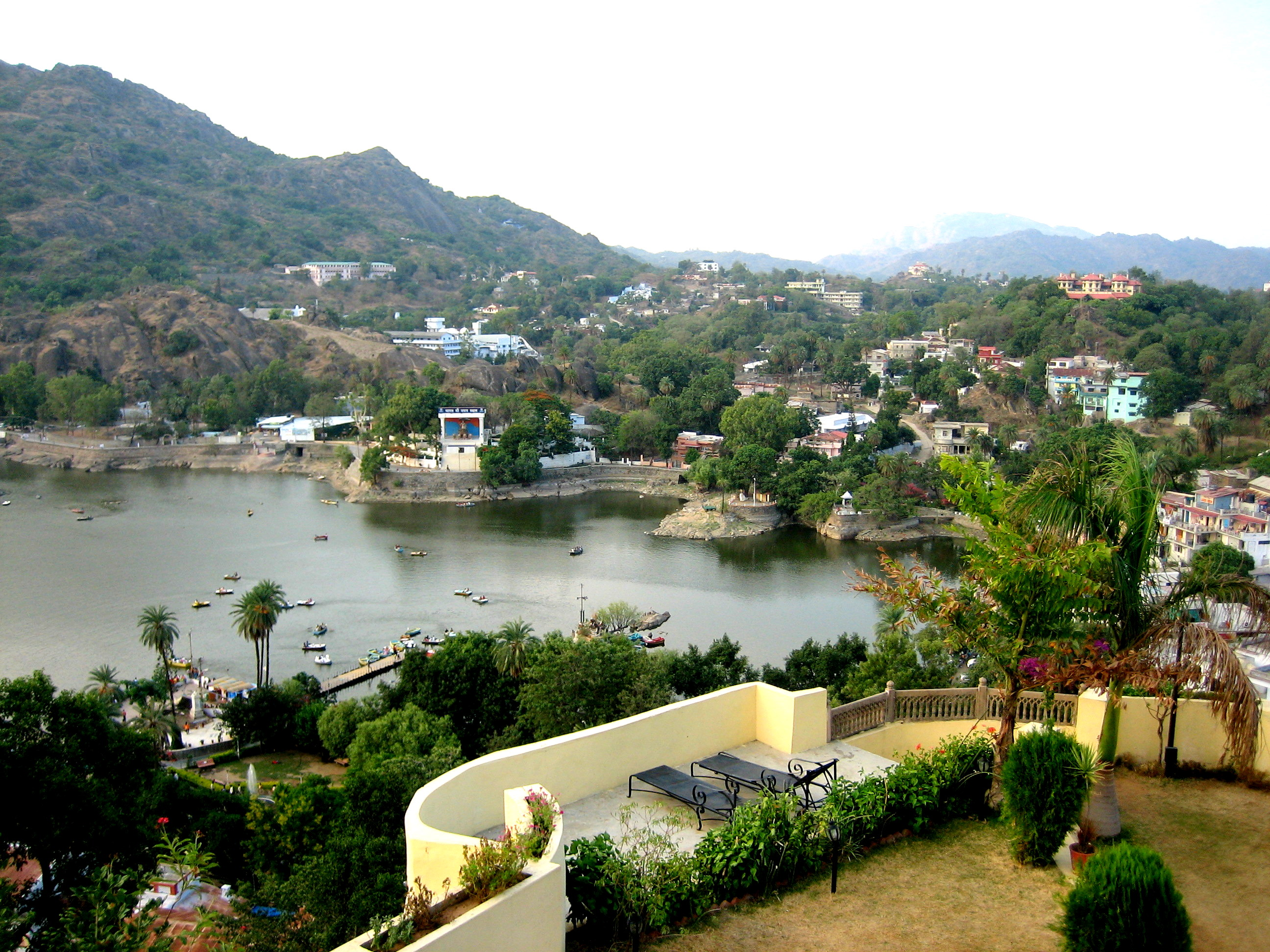

- Location within Rajasthan Location within India
- Coordinates: 24.5925°N 72.7083°E
- Country: India
- State: Rajasthan
- District: Sirohi

Government
  - Body: Aburaj Municipality
- Elevation: 1,220 m (4,000 ft)

Population (2011)
  - Total: 22,943
  - Density: 50/km^{2} (130/sq mi)
- Time zone: UTC+5:30 (IST)
- PIN: 307501
- Telephone code: +02974
- ISO 3166 code: RJ-IN
- Vehicle registration: RJ 38
- Nearest city: Abu Road, Udaipur, Ahmedabad, Patan, Gandhinagar,

Abu Raj [formerly Mount Abu] is a hill station in the Sirohi district of the state of Rajasthan in western India. Here, the mountain forms a rocky plateau 22 km (14 mi) long by 9 km (5.6 mi) wide. It is sometimes referred to as an "oasis in the desert" due to the presence of rivers, lakes, waterfalls, and evergreen forests. It is also home to numerous Hindu and Jain temples.

== History ==
The ancient name of Mount Abu is Arbuda. In the Puranas, the region has been referred to as Arbudaranya ("forest of Arbuda") and 'Abu' is a diminutive of this ancient name. It is believed that sage Vasishtha retired to the southern spur at Mount Abu following his differences with sage Vishvamitra. There is another history story according to which a serpent named "Arbuda" saved the life of Nandi (Lord Shiva's bull). The incident happened on the mountain that is currently known as Mount Abu, and so the mountain is named "Arbudaranya" after that incident, which gradually became Abu.

According to a legend, the sage Vasishtha performed a yajna at the peak of Mount Abu, to seek from the gods a provision for the defense of righteousness on earth. In answer to his prayer, a youth arose from the Agnikunda (fire-altar) — the first Agnivansha. Achalgarh Fort is one of the more attractive places built by Paramara kings. The Dilwara Temples are a pilgrimage centre for the Jain religion among the lush green hills of Aravalli. The Dilwara Jain Temple is located at a distance of 2.5 km (1.6 mi) from Mount Abu. Vastupala designed the temple. Vimal Shah built it between the 11th century and the 13th century. The complex is sculpted of white marble in every corner of the temple.

Rao Lumba of the Deora-Chauhan dynasty conquered Mount Abu in 1311 CE. He shifted the capital to Chandravati in the plains. After the destruction of Chandravati in 1405, Rao Shasmal made Sirohi his headquarters. It was later leased by the British government from the Maharaja of Sirohi for use as the headquarters.

The Arbuda Mountains region is said to be the original abode of famous gurus like Atri and Vasishtha. The association of the gurus with the mountain is noticed in many inscriptions and epigraphs including Tilakamanjari of Dhanpala. According to one theory, this Gurdhara, or land of the gurus, got corrupted with time and became Gurjara.

A municipality was established at Abu in 1864; it had six members nominated by the Agent to the Governor General (AGG).

== Tourism ==
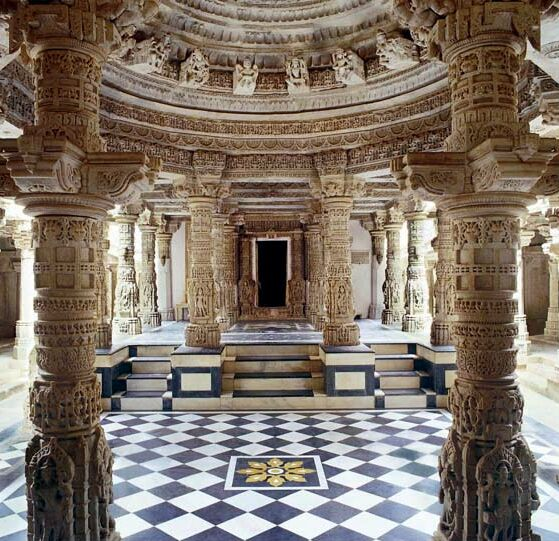
Adishwara temple, Dilwara Temples

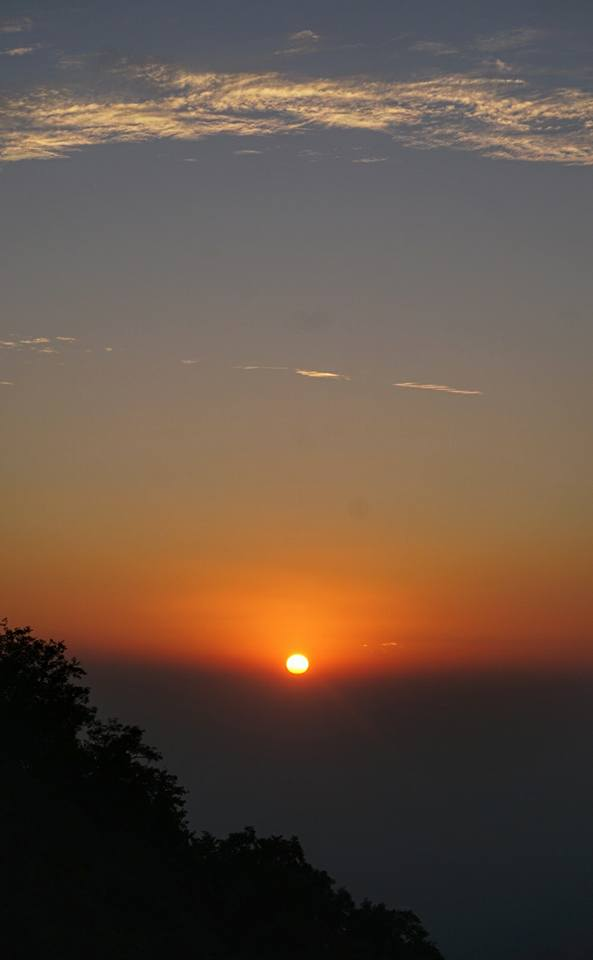
Sunset at Mount Abu

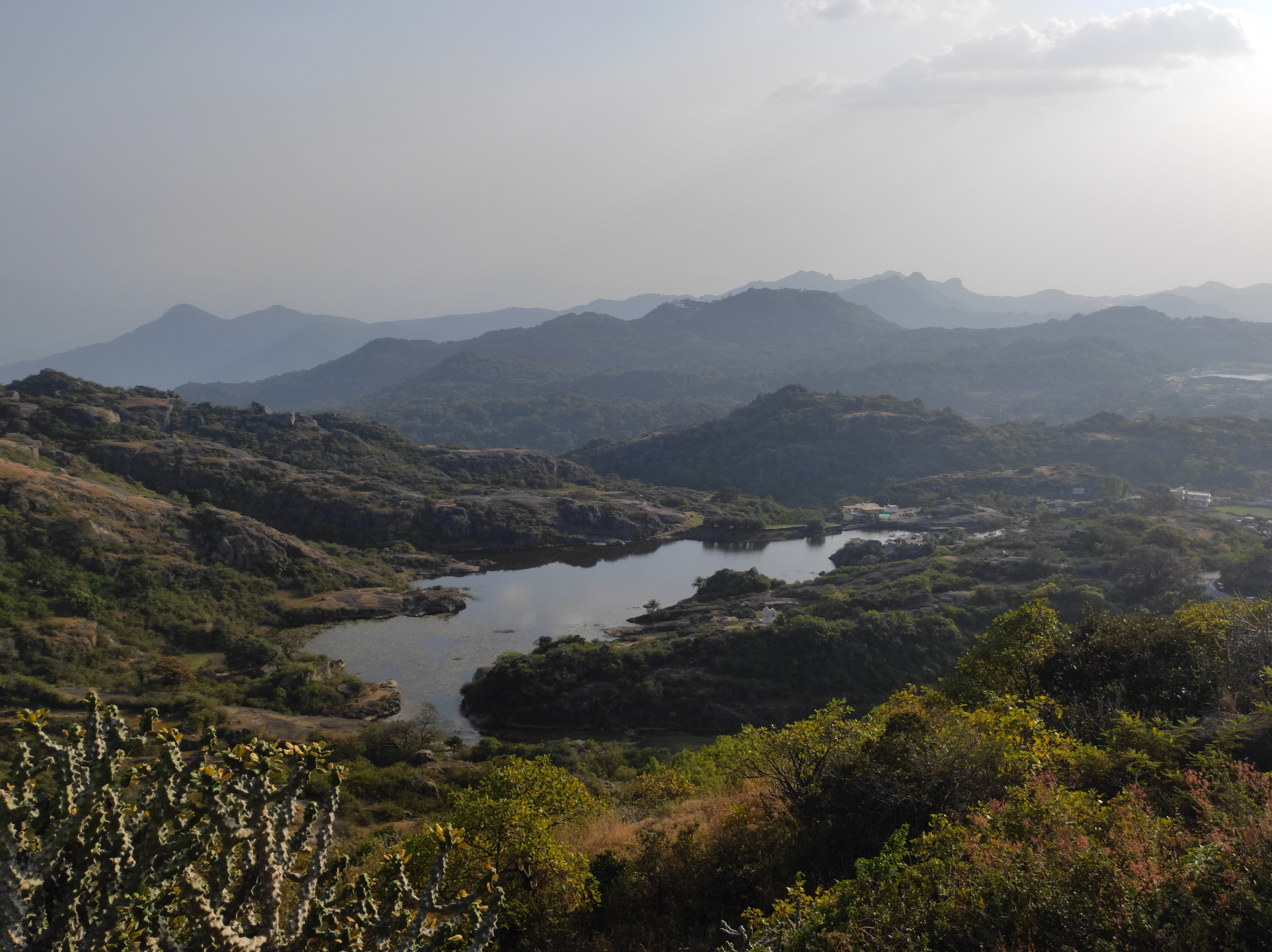
View from shooting Point, Mount Abu

Mount Abu town, the only hill station in Rajasthan, is at an elevation of 1,220 m (4,003 ft). It has been a popular retreat from the heat of Rajasthan and neighboring Gujarat for centuries.

The mountain is home to several Hindu temples, including the Adhar Devi Temple (also known as Arbuda Devi Temple), carved out of solid rock; the Shri Raghunath Ji Temple; the shrine and temple to Dattatreya built atop the Guru Shikhar peak; and the Achaleshwar Mahadev Temple (1412).

The Achalgarh Fort, built in the 14th century by Kumbha of Mewar, is nearby, and at its center is the popular visitor attraction, Nakki Lake. The Toad Rock is on a hill near the lake. Close to the fort is the Achaleshwar Mahadev Temple, a popular Shiva temple. The Achal Fort Jain Temple and the Shantinath Jain Temple (1513) are equally famous.

The Durga Ambika Mata Temple lies in a cleft of rock in Jagat, just outside Mount Abu town.

The mountain is also home to a number of Jain temples,s including the Dilwara Temples, a complex of temples carved out of white marble. The Dilwara Temples (or Delvada Temples) are located about 2.5 km (1.6 mi) from Mount Abu town. These Jain temples were built by Vimal Shah and designed by Vastupala, Jain ministers of Dholka, between the 11th and 16th centuries, and are famous for their use of white marble and intricate marble carvings. They are a pilgrimage place of Jains, and a popular general tourist attraction. The temples have an opulent entranceway, with the simplicity in architecture reflecting Jain values like honesty and frugality. Minutely carved ornamental detail covers the ceilings, doorways, pillars, and panels. The temple complex is in the midst of a range of forested hills. There are five temples in all, each with its own unique identity. All five temples are enclosed within a single high wall compound. The group is named after the small village of Dilwara or Delvara in which they are located. The five temples are:

- Vimal Vasahi, dedicated to the first Jain Tirthankara, Shri Rishabhadev.
- Luna Vasahi, dedicated to the 22nd Jain Tirthankara, Shri Neminatha.
- Pittalhar, dedicated to the first Jain Tirthankar, Shri Rishabhadev.
- Parshvanath, dedicated to the 23rd Jain Tirthankara, Shri Parshvanatha.
- Mahavir Swami, dedicated to the last Jain Tirthankara, Shri Mahaviraswami.

Among the five legendary marble temples of Dilwara, the most famous are the Vimal Vasahi and the Luna Vasahi temples.

The spiritual headquarters of the faith organization Brahma Kumaris is located on Mount Abu, receiving about 2.5 million visitors annually. The community is notable in its teaching of the meditation technique known as Raja Yoga, in which students identify the self as a non-physical, eternal soul; recover its seven original qualities—peace, love, happiness, purity, knowledge, bliss, and power—through silent remembrance of an incorporeal Supreme Soul; and cultivate them as ethical virtues in everyday life. The 50-acre campus also provides ample space for meditation and spiritual learning, including an ashram exhibiting the knowledge that Lord Shiva gave to the Prajapita Brahma.

The Mount Abu Wildlife Sanctuary was established in 1960 and covers 290 km^{2} (110 mi^{2}) of the mountain. The sanctuary encircles the town, and sloth bears from the sanctuary have habitually been seen inside the city throughout the year foraging on hotel waste in open rubbish bins.

Mount Abu has a distinctive ecological setting within the Aravalli Range. The Mount Abu Wildlife Sanctuary extends from approximately 300 m (980 ft) at the foothills to 1,722 m (5,650 ft) at Guru Shikhar, producing substantial variation in climate, vegetation, and habitat. The Rajasthan Forest Department describes vegetation ranging from xeromorphic subtropical thorn forest at the foothills to subtropical evergreen forest along watercourses and valleys at higher elevations. The sanctuary supports diverse plant communities, including orchids, ferns, bamboo, and medicinal plants, as well as rare, threatened, and endemic species. The ecological diversity of the sanctuary is also reflected in its fauna. The Rajasthan Forest Department records a wide range of mammals, reptiles, and birds, and notes that more than 150 bird species have been recorded by bird-watchers in the sanctuary. The combination of elevation, vegetation, and habitat diversity provides conditions for both forest and open-habitat species. Mount Abu is also significant for avifauna within the southern Aravallis. Ornithological studies have documented a range of bird species and habitats in the sanctuary, including the threatened green avadavat (Amandava formosa), also known as the green munia. Earlier field observations recorded the species in grassland, agricultural, and shrub-associated habitats at several locations on the Abu hills.

== In literature ==
Arbuda Mountains is a mountain range described in the epic Mahabharata. It is identified to be Mount Abu. The range is mentioned in the travels of Arjuna during his twelve-year pilgrimage.

Letitia Elizabeth Landon's poem Hindoo Temples on the Mountain-Lake of Aboo, published in Fisher's Drawing Room Scrap Book, 1839, is a reflection on this mountain fastness.

Megasthenes, a Greek writer and ambassador to Chandragupta Maurya's kingdom, refers to Mount Abu by the name "Capitalia" in his book Indica. Megasthenes also mentions Nehra people as Narae, one of the many inhabitants of the mountain.

== Climate ==
Mount Abu has a humid subtropical climate (Köppen Cwa). Due to its altitude, Mount Abu gets more rain than any other part of Rajasthan, with over 500 mm (20 in) per month falling in July and August. While it still has hot summers, the summers are not as extreme due to the altitude, and the monsoon has relatively comfortable temperatures (24 to 30 °C or 75 to 86 °F). The average annual precipitation in Mount Abu is 1,554 mm (61.2 in).

Winters are pleasant in Mount Abu, with the temperature around 13 to 22 °C (55.4 to 71.6 °F). Mornings are chilly, and the average minimum temperature is around 3 to 12 °C (37.4 to 53.6 °F). The temperature has dipped to as low as −7.4 °C or 18.7 °F.

Climate data for Mount Abu (1991–2020, extremes 1901–2020)
Month	Jan	Feb	Mar	Apr	May	Jun	Jul	Aug	Sep	Oct	Nov	Dec	Year
Record high °C (°F)	29.0 (84.2)	30.6 (87.1)	39.6 (103.3)	38.8 (101.8)	40.4 (104.7)	38.4 (101.1)	35.0 (95.0)	31.1 (88.0)	33.0 (91.4)	33.6 (92.5)	30.4 (86.7)	34.2 (93.6)	40.6 (105.1)
Mean daily maximum °C (°F)	19.6 (67.3)	22.6 (72.7)	26.9 (80.4)	30.9 (87.6)	32.5 (90.5)	30.3 (86.5)	25.0 (77.0)	23.6 (74.5)	25.5 (77.9)	27.5 (81.5)	24.4 (75.9)	21.8 (71.2)	25.9 (78.6)
Daily mean °C (°F)	11.3 (52.3)	14.1 (57.4)	18.7 (65.7)	23.1 (73.6)	25.4 (77.7)	24.3 (75.7)	21.1 (70.0)	19.9 (67.8)	20.5 (68.9)	19.7 (67.5)	15.8 (60.4)	12.8 (55.0)	18.9 (66.0)
Mean daily minimum °C (°F)	2.9 (37.2)	5.5 (41.9)	10.4 (50.7)	15.3 (59.5)	18.3 (64.9)	18.2 (64.8)	17.1 (62.8)	16.2 (61.2)	15.5 (59.9)	11.9 (53.4)	7.1 (44.8)	3.8 (38.8)	11.9 (53.4)
Record low °C (°F)	−7.0 (19.4)	−5.8 (21.6)	0.4 (32.7)	4.4 (39.9)	10.0 (50.0)	13.0 (55.4)	10.0 (50.0)	10.6 (51.1)	6.4 (43.5)	3.4 (38.1)	−0.4 (31.3)	−7.4 (18.7)	−7.4 (18.7)
Average rainfall mm (inches)	1.9 (0.07)	1.2 (0.05)	2.2 (0.09)	4.0 (0.16)	3.7 (0.15)	65.3 (2.57)	601.9 (23.70)	463.1 (18.23)	220.0 (8.66)	23.0 (0.91)	1.4 (0.06)	1.6 (0.06)	1,389.3 (54.70)
Average rainy days	0.3	0.1	0.1	0.3	0.3	3.3	14.6	14.5	6.6	0.8	0.2	0.2	41.3
Average relative humidity (%) (at 17:30 IST)	49	42	37	37	41	56	86	91	78	56	52	50	55
Source: India Meteorological Department

== Culture ==
- Winter Festival at Mount Abu

== Demographics ==
According to the 2011 Census of India, Aburaj has a population of 22,943, out of which 54.7% are males and 45.3% are females. It has an average literacy rate of 81.15%, higher than the national average of 74.04%: male literacy is 90.12%, and female literacy is 70.23%. In Aburaj, 12.34% of the population is under 6 years of age.

Of the people, 89.31% are Hindu, 7.69% are Muslim, and 1.45% are Christian.

== Biodiversity research and conservation ==
Biodiversity research at Mount Abu has included long-term ornithological studies, with particular attention to the green avadavat. Mehra and Sharma reported additional site records of the species from Mount Abu in 2004. Mehra, Sharma, and Mathur subsequently published a study of the munias of Mount Abu, with particular emphasis on the green avadavat, based on observations undertaken during 2004–2005. During his association with WWF-India, Satya Prakash Mehra was involved in biodiversity and habitat assessment, field research and documentation, and conservation-management planning relating to Mount Abu Wildlife Sanctuary. His work included activities associated with natural resource management and the proposed Eco-Sensitive Zone of the sanctuary. Subsequent work associated with Mehra and the Rajputana Society of Natural History addressed green avadavat behaviour, habitat protection, awareness, and community participation. A socio-ecological model for green munia conservation was presented at the Udaipur Bird Festival in 2020. The Abu Model, subsequently documented through the PANORAMA platform, linked green avadavat conservation with nature tourism, local ecological knowledge, community participation, and livelihood opportunities. Independent research has continued to examine the species and its habitat at Mount Abu. A study published in Bird Conservation International in 2026, based on systematic surveys conducted during March–August 2023, detected green avadavat in 40 of 129 surveyed 1-km² grid squares. The study found that occurrence was associated with higher elevations and areas with greater grass and shrub cover, and identified development, sprawl, and land-use change as pressures on suitable habitat.

== Gallery ==
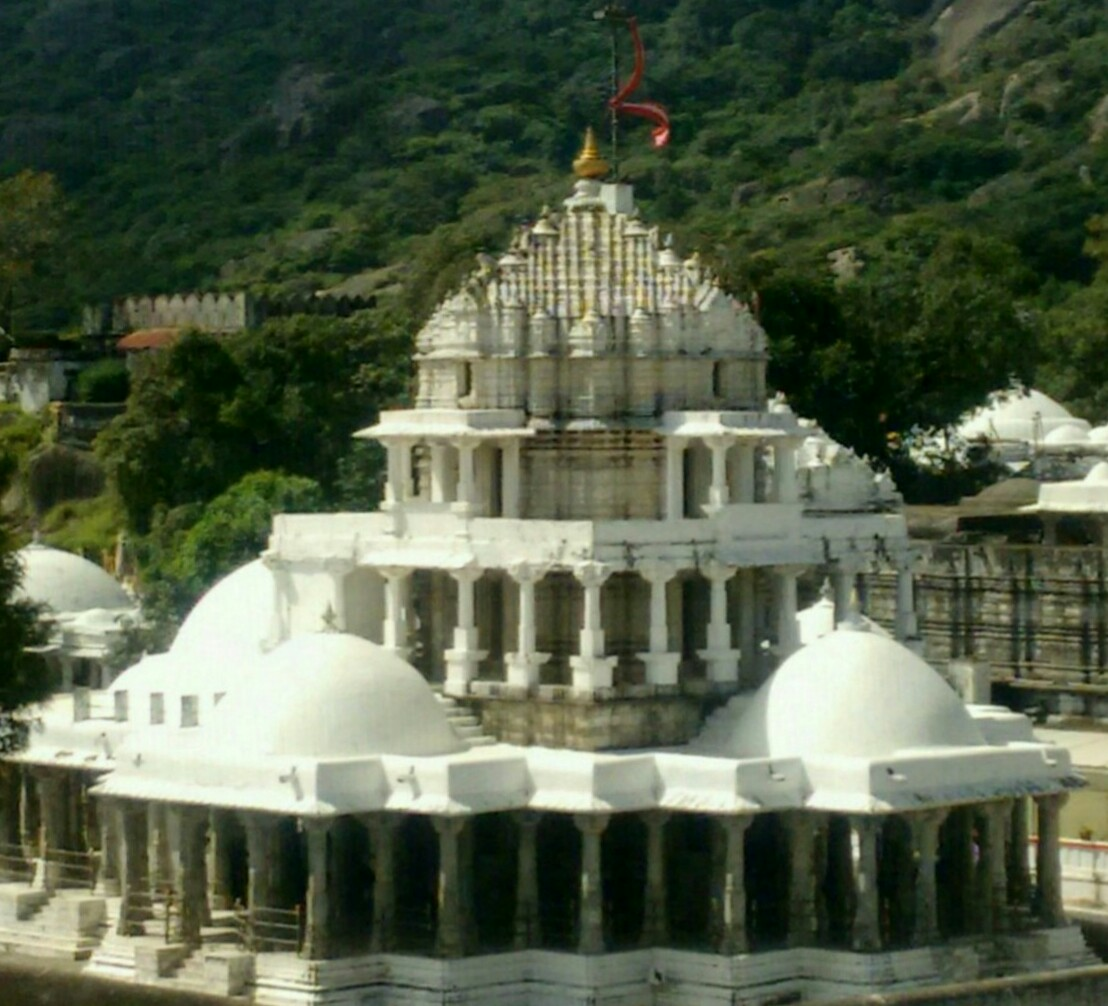
Parshvanatha Temple at Dilwara group of temples

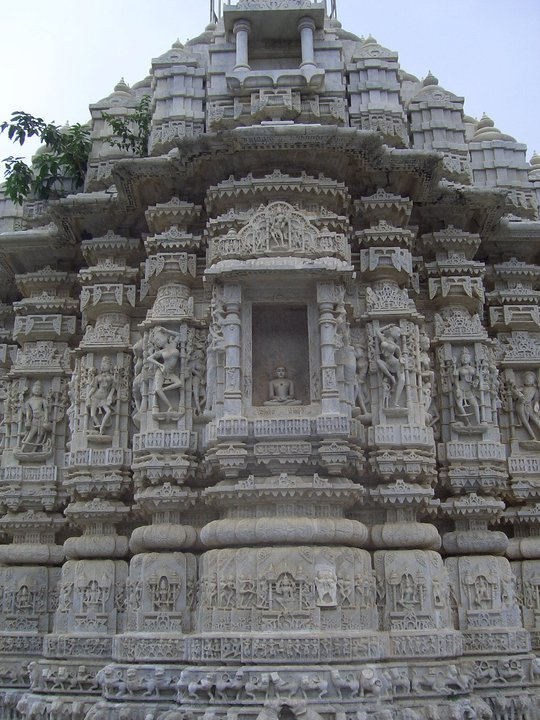
Marble sculpture of Dilwara Temples

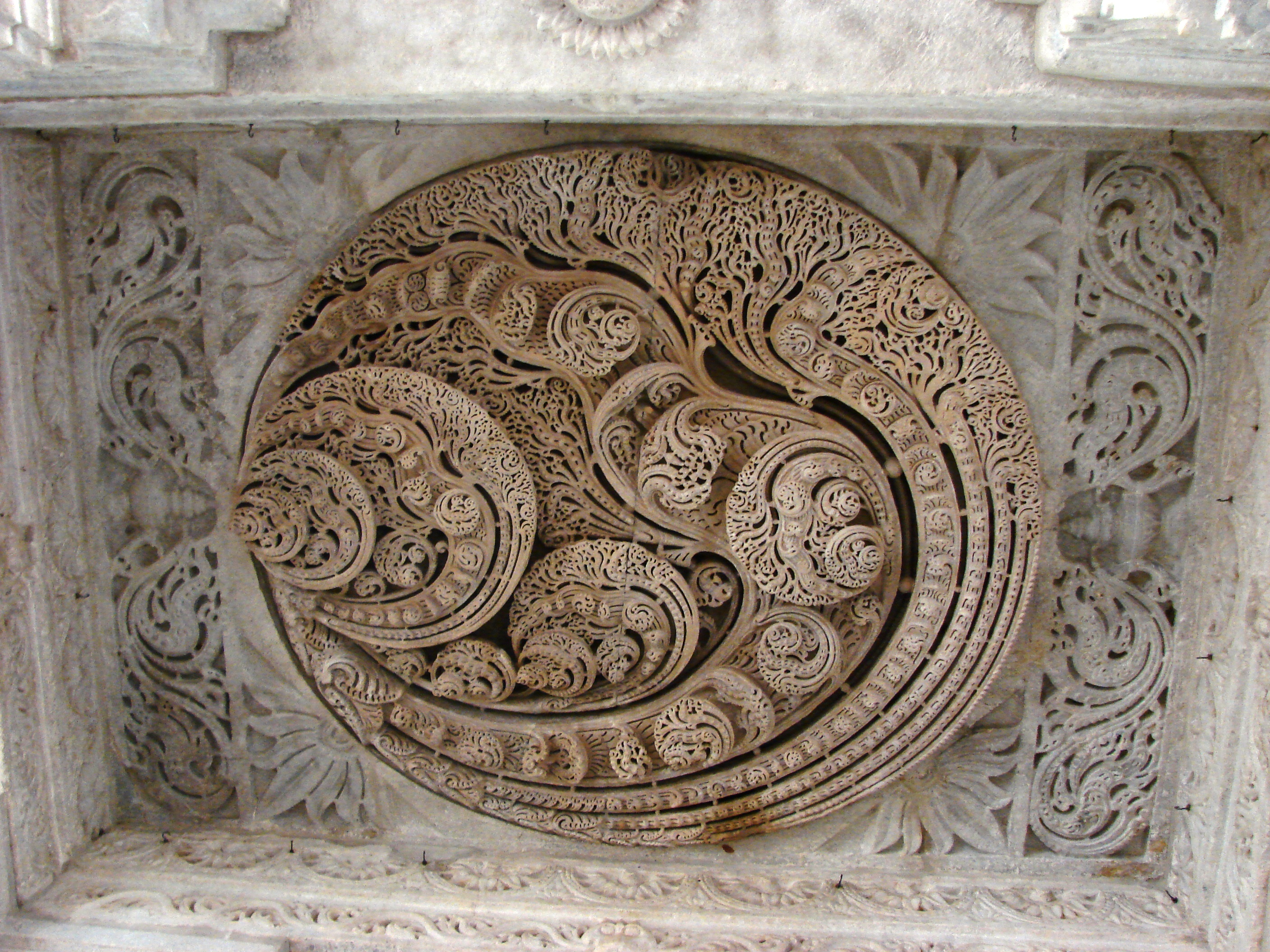
Kalpavriksha or Kalpavruksha page in Dilwada Jain Temple

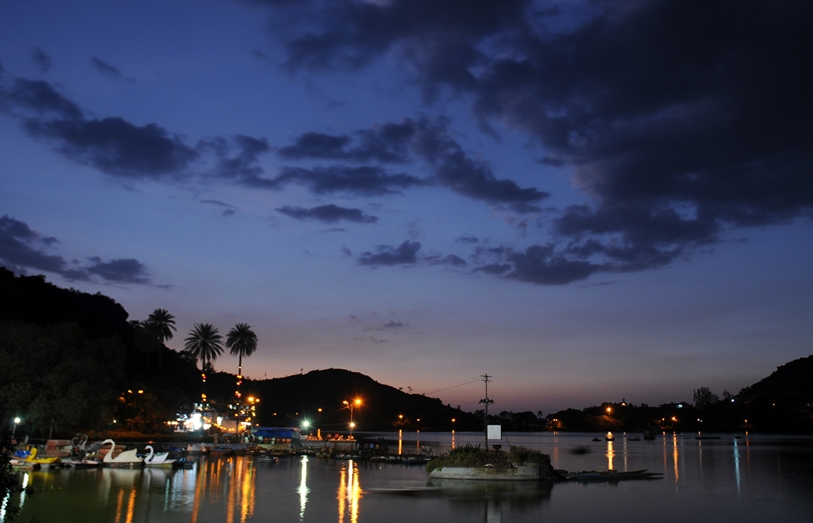
Nakki Lake after sunset

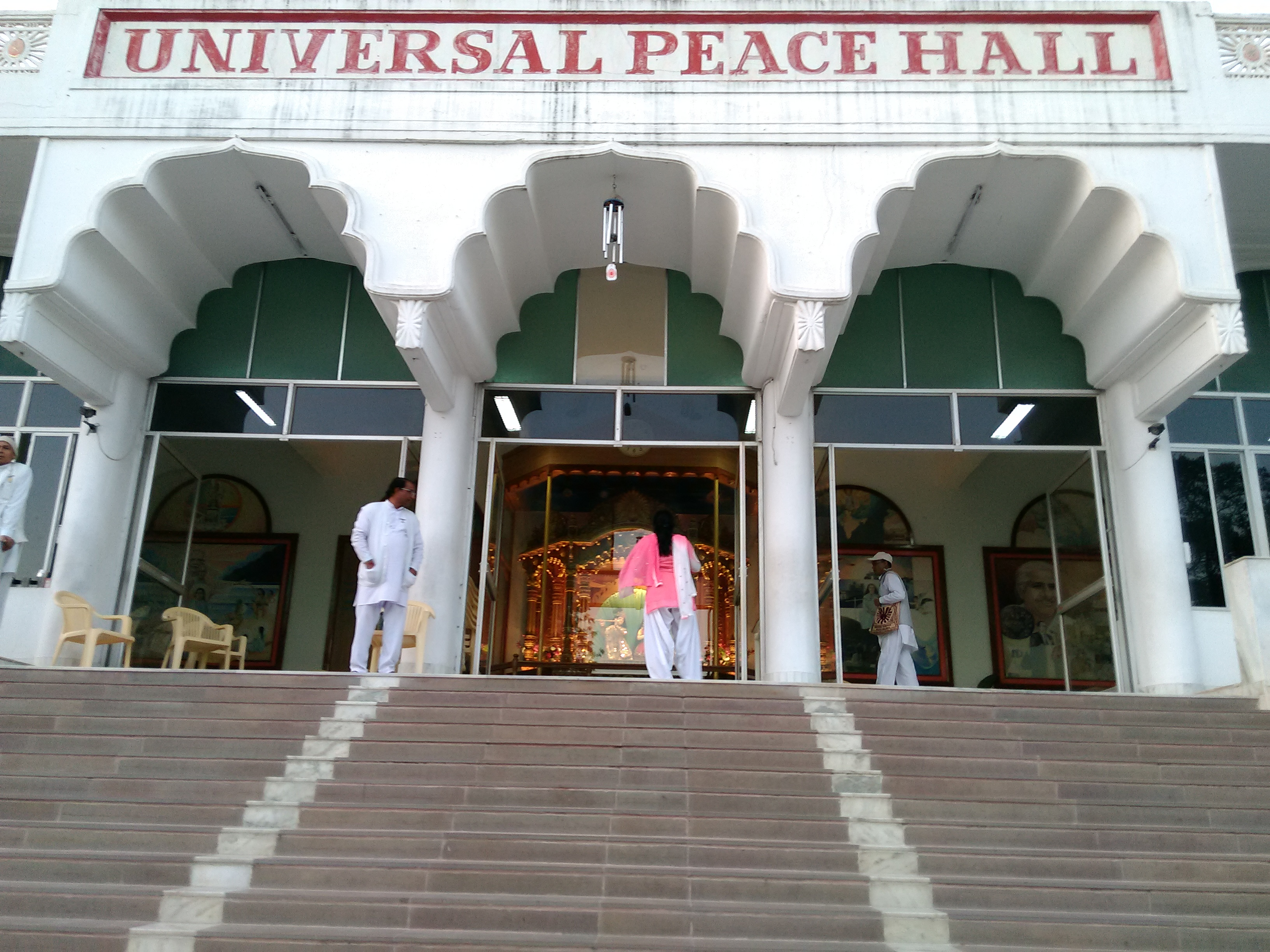
Brahma Kumari foundation headquarters at Aburaj

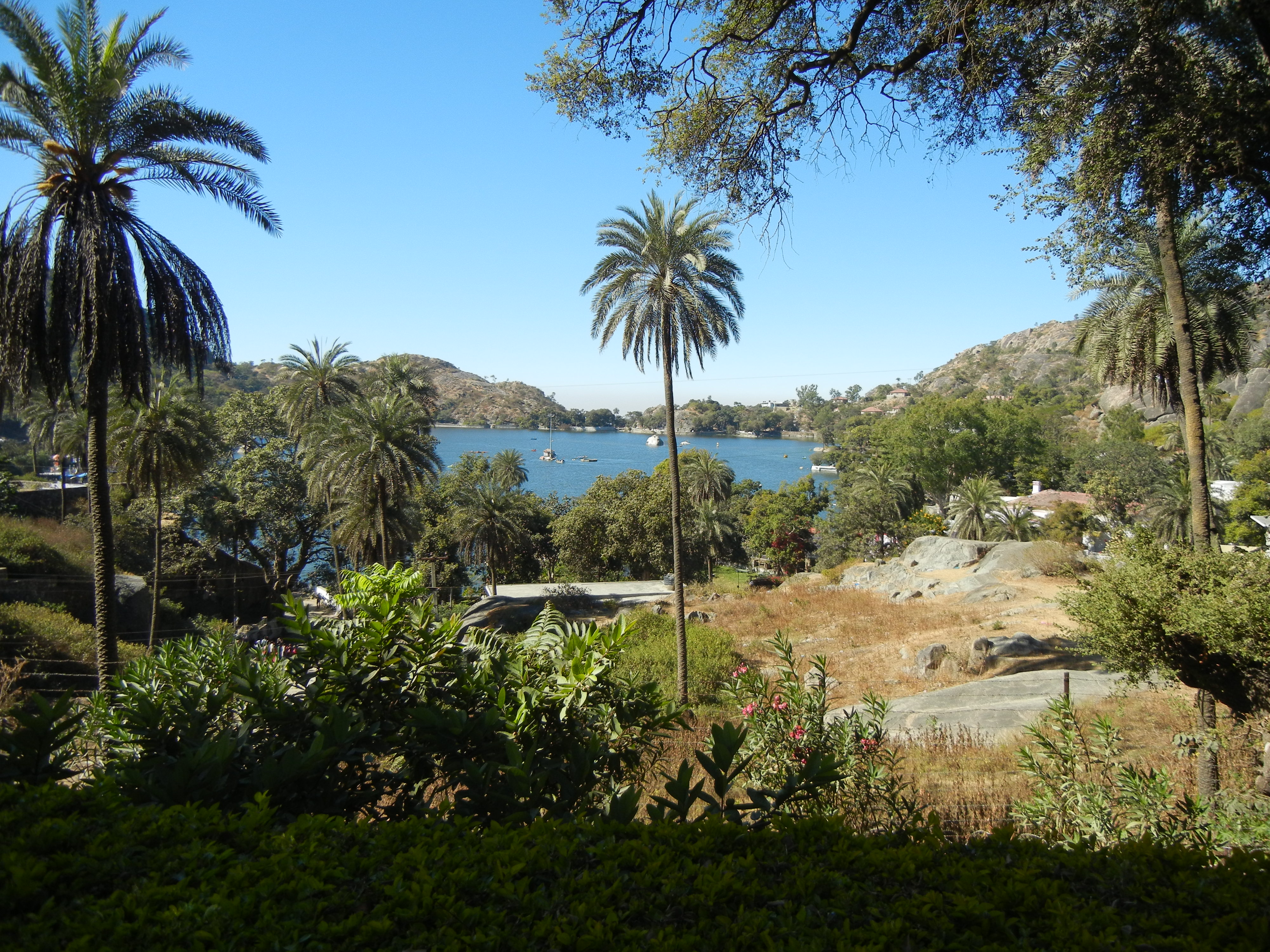
Mount Abu Wildlife Sanctuary covers 290 km² of mountains, forests and lake.

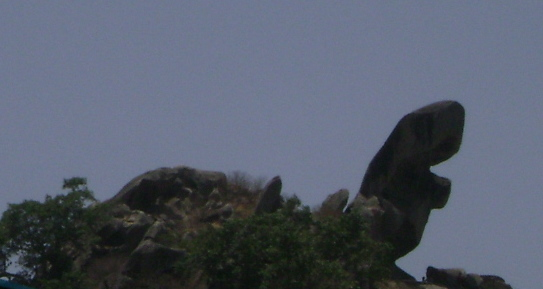
Turtle-shaped rock near Nakki Lake.

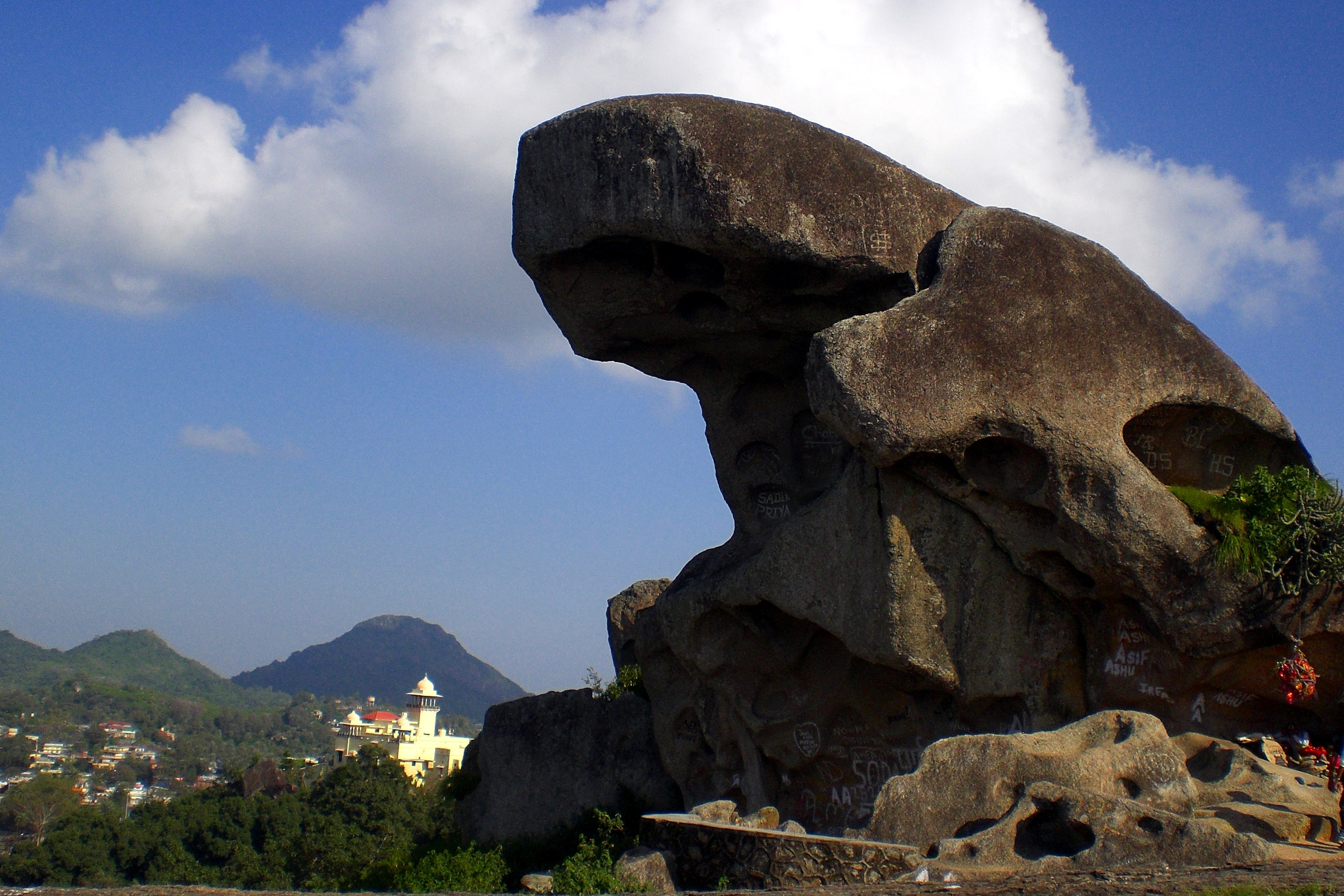
Toad rock on a hill near Nakki Lake.

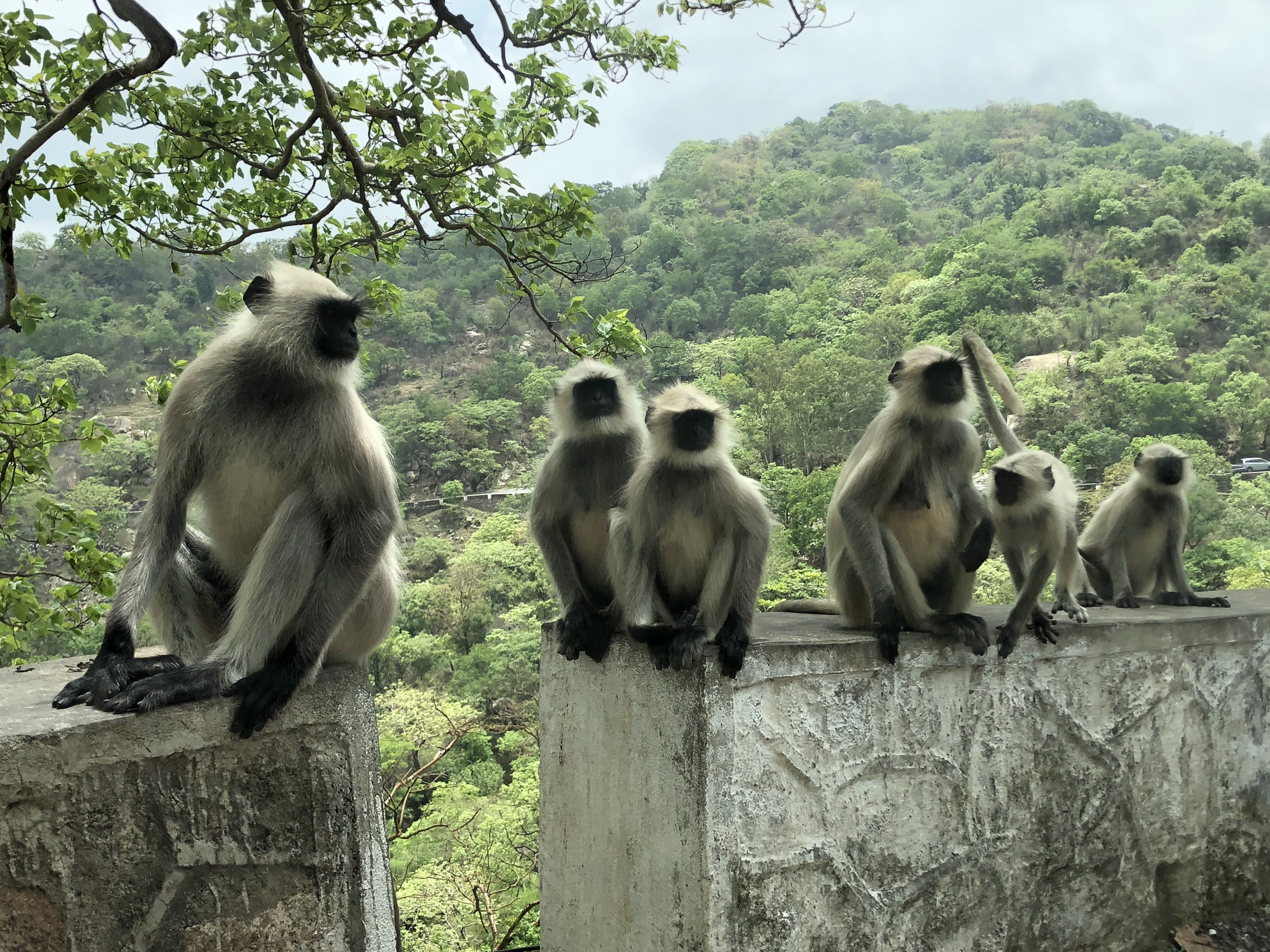
Monkeys near Mount Abu, Rajasthan, India

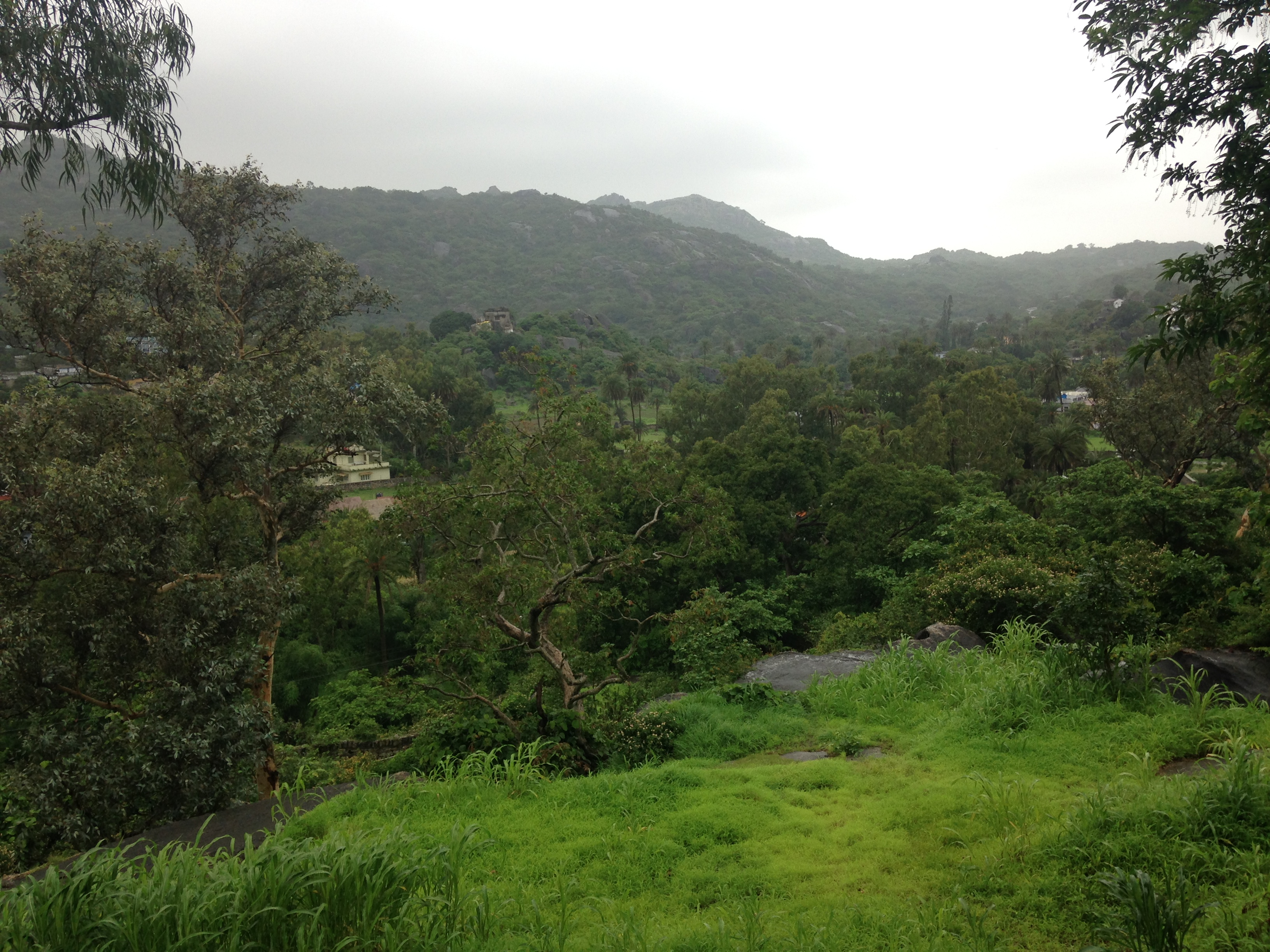
Aburaj in monsoon

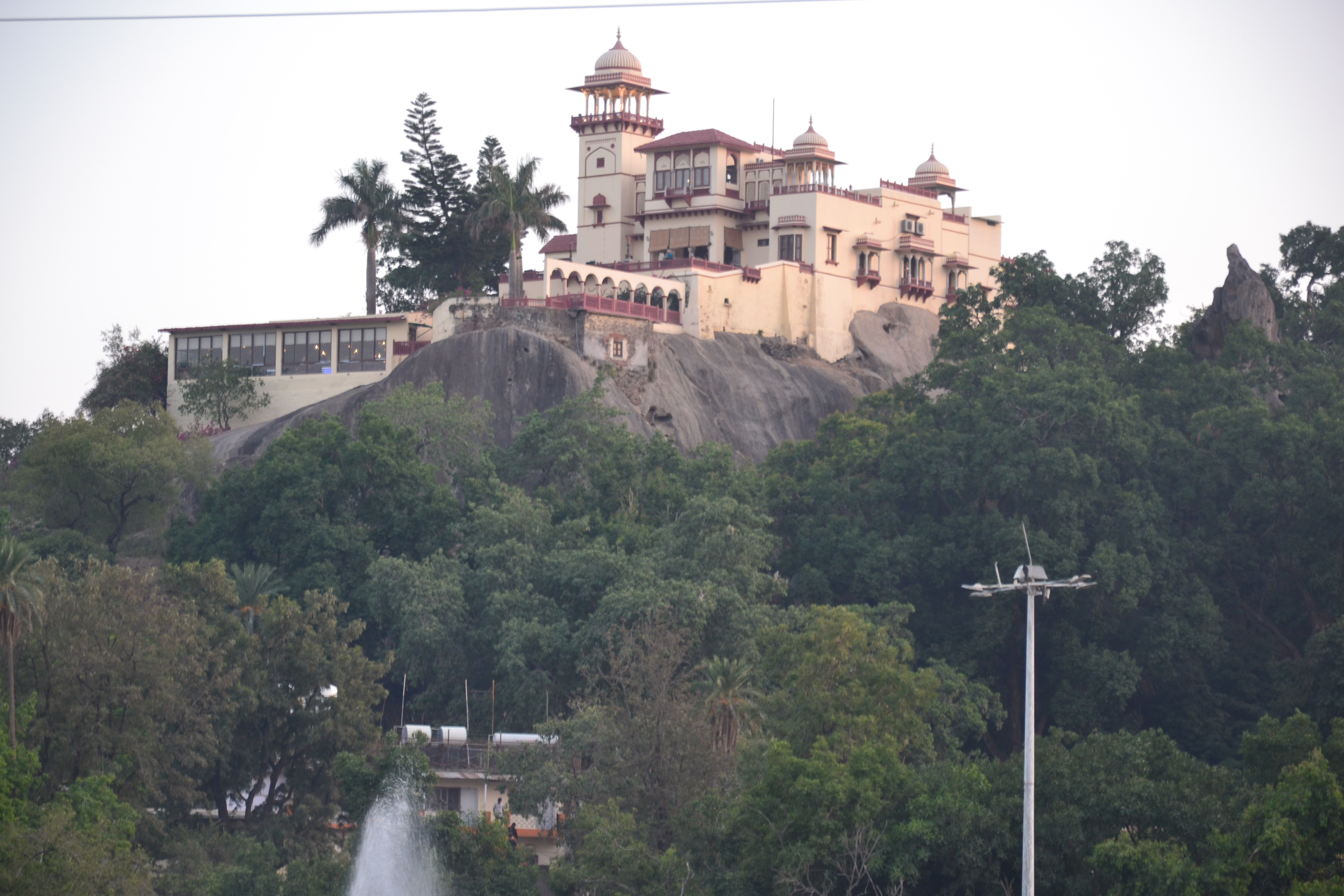
Former royal residence of the royal family of Jaipur. Now, a five-star hotel.

== See also ==
- Sacred mountains of India

== Sources ==
- Adams, W. J. (1864), Bradshaw's hand-book to the Bombay presidency and North-western provinces of India, Oxford University
- Balfour, Edward (1885), The Cyclopædia of India and of Eastern and Southern Asia, vol. 1, B. Quartitc
- Coolidge, Archibald Cary (1880), The Rajputana Gazetteer, vol. 3, Government Central Branch Press.
- Jain, Arun Kumar (2009), Faith & Philosophy of Jainism, Gyan Publishing House, ISBN 9788178357232
- Kumar, Sehdev (2001), A Thousand Petalled Lotus: Jain Temples of Rajasthan : Architecture & Iconography, Abhinav Publications, ISBN 9788170173489
- Shah, Umakant Premanand (1995), Studies in Jaina Art and Iconography and Allied Subjects, Abhinav Publications, ISBN 9788170173168
- White, David Gordon (1996), The Alchemical Body: Siddha Traditions in Medieval India, University of Chicago Press, ISBN 9780226894973
