= Guru Shikhar =

Highest peak of the Aravali Range

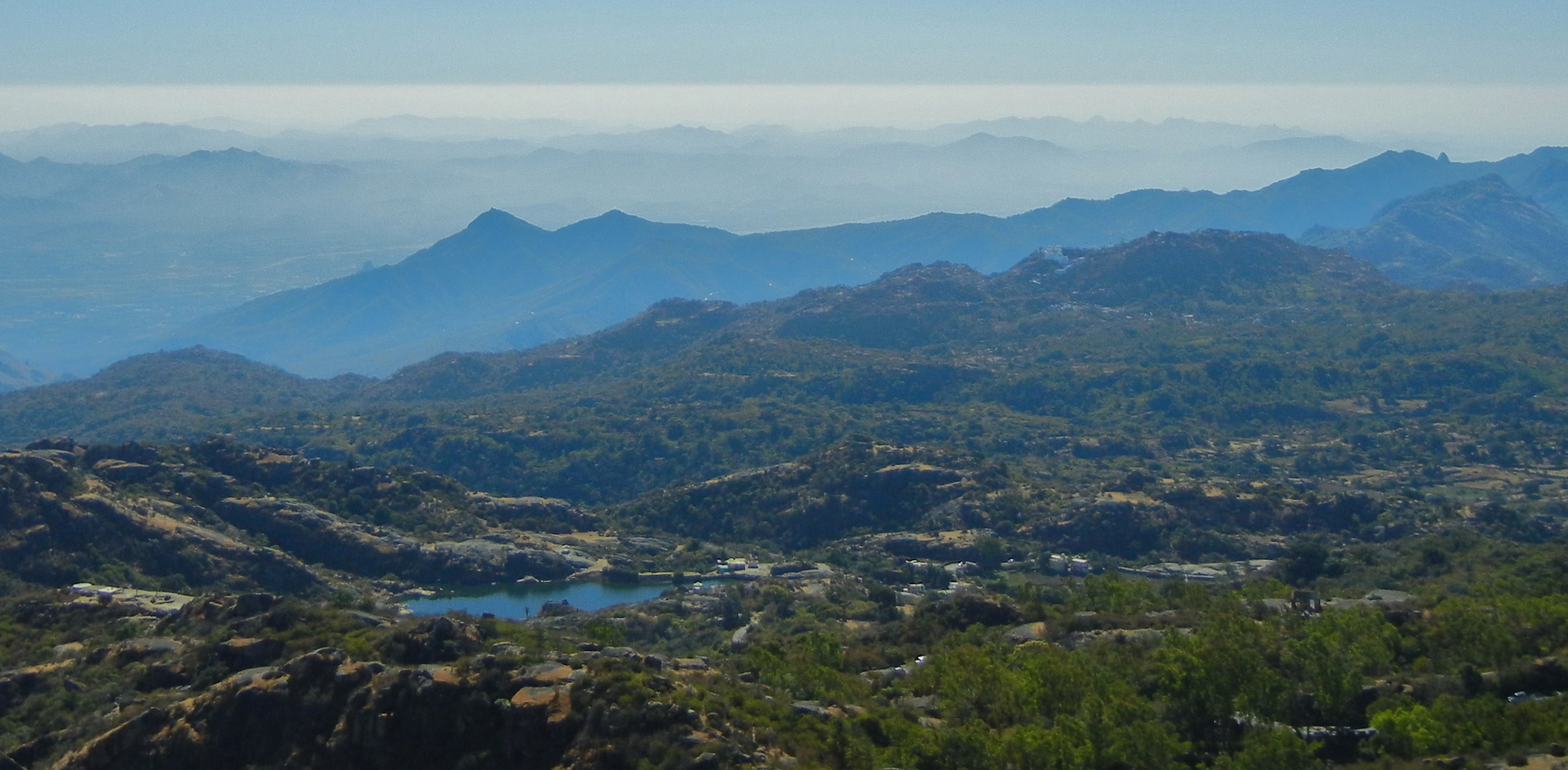
- Aravalli Range as seen from Guru Shikhar

Highest point
- Elevation: 1,722 m (5,650 ft)
- Prominence: 1,372 m (4,501 ft)
- Isolation: 615 km (382 mi)
- Listing: List of Indian states and territories by highest point, Ribu
- Coordinates: 24°38′59.5″N 72°46′34.5″E

Geography
- Location within Rajasthan
- Location: Abu Road Tehsil, Sirohi district, Rajasthan, India
- Country: India
- State: Rajasthan
- District: Sirohi district
- Parent range: Arbuda Mountains, Aravalli Range

Guru Shikhar, a peak in the Arbuda Mountains of Sirohi district in Rajasthan, is the highest point of the Aravalli Range, Rajasthan, and Western India. It rises to an elevation of 1,722 metres (5,650 ft). It is 75 km from Sirohi city, the district headquarter and 15 km from Mount Abu and a road from there leads almost to the top of the mountain. It is named Guru-Shikhar or 'the peak of the guru' after Dattatreya, an incarnation of Vishnu, and of a cave at the summit contains a temple dedicated to him, plus one dedicated his mother, Anasuya, wife of sage Atri nearby.

Adjacent to the temple is the Mt Abu Observatory operated by the Physical Research Laboratory. This observatory hosts a 1.2m infrared telescope and also several Astronomy experiments.

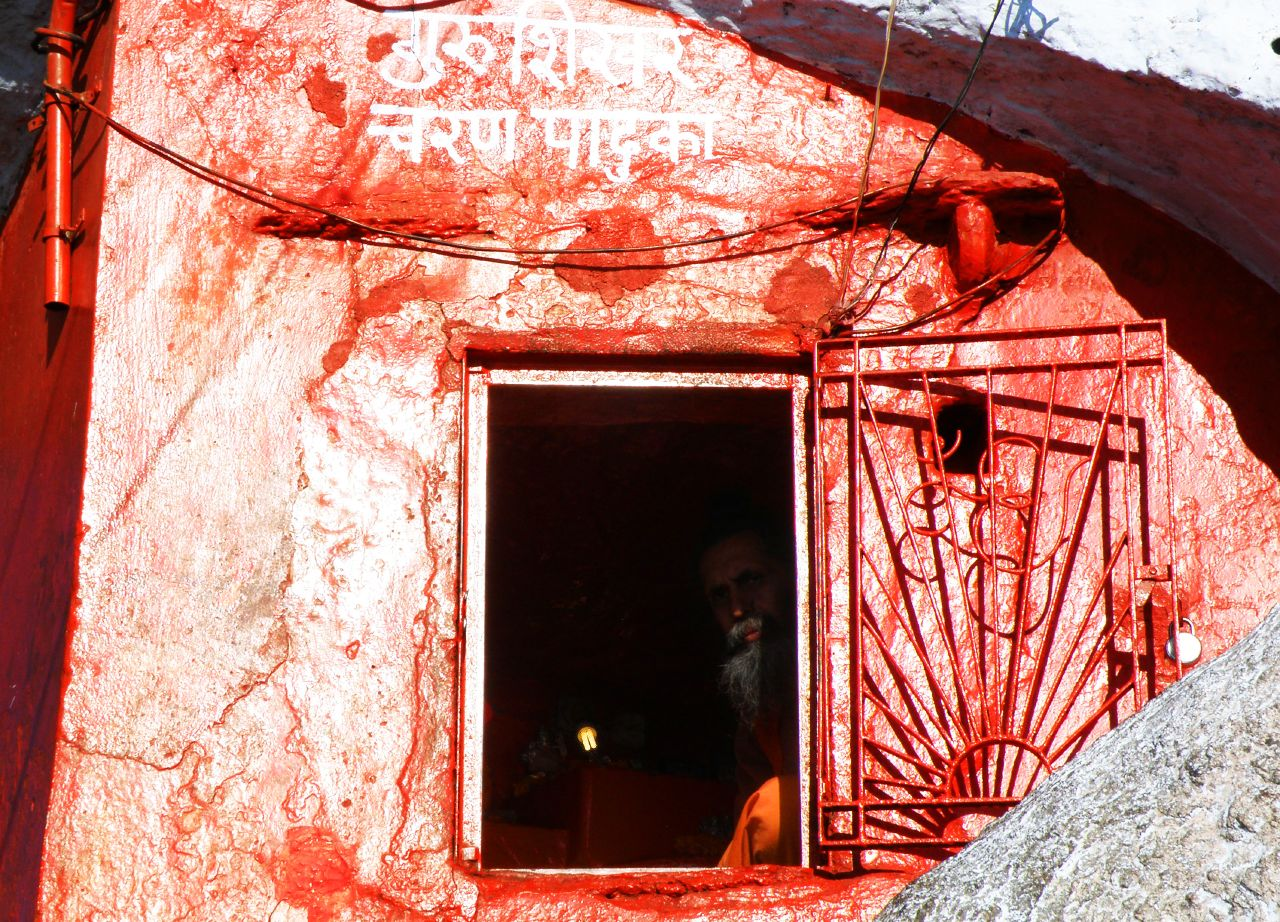
Entrance to the small cave temple atop Guru Shikar.

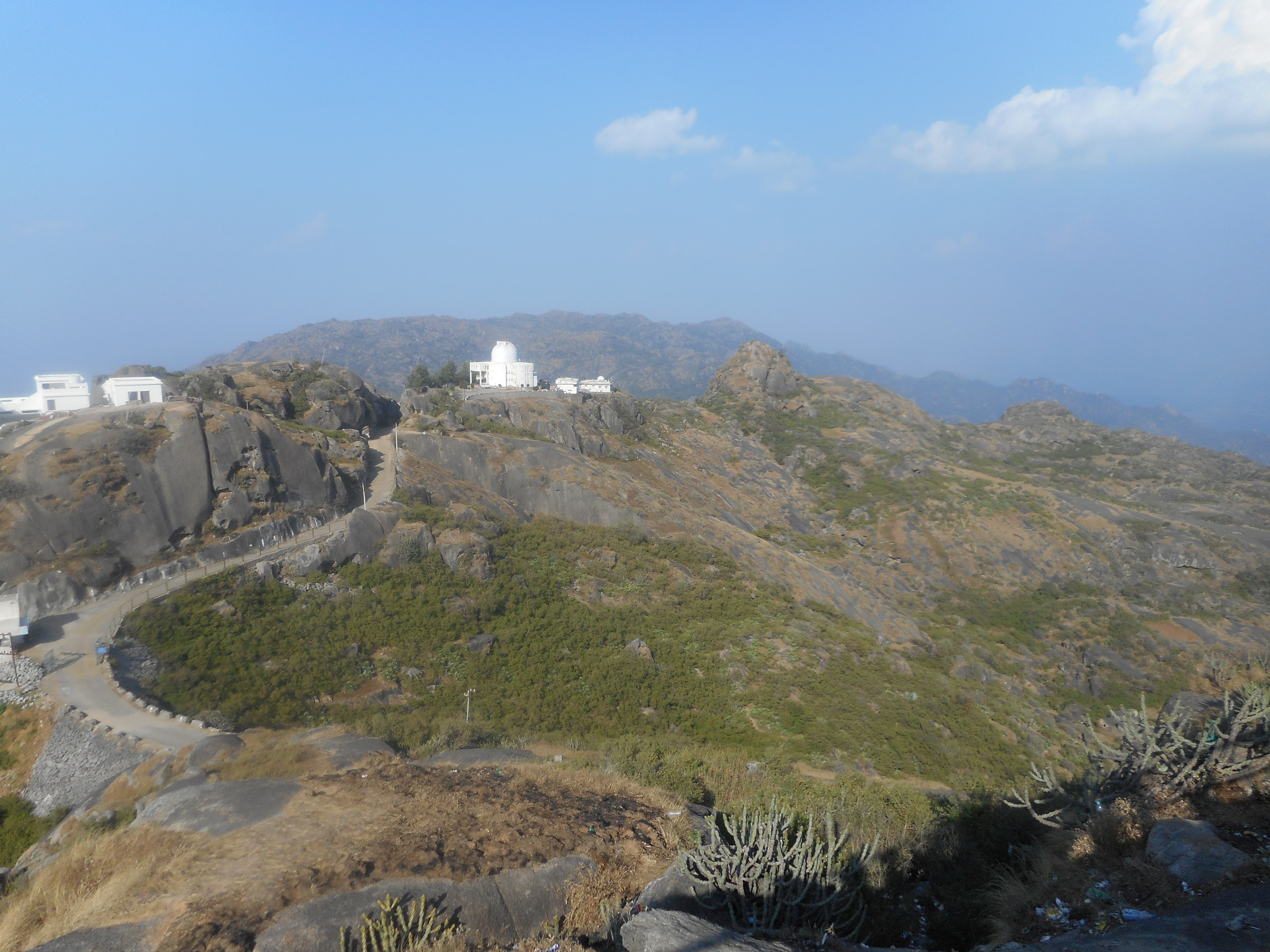
View from the highest point in Mount Abu.
