= Gandhi Ghat =

Gandhi Ghat may refer to:

- Gandhi Ghat, Patna, India
- Gandhi Ghat, Barrackpore, India
