= BK Brij Mohan =

Indian Brahma Kumaris spiritual leader (1934–2025)

Brij Mohan

Personal life
- Born: 7 January 1934 Amritsar, Punjab, British India
- Died: 9 October 2025 (aged 91) Manesar, Haryana, India
- Known for: Secretary General of the Brahma Kumaris (2024–2025); Chief Spokesperson of the Brahma Kumaris; Director, Godlywood Studio at the Om Shanti Retreat Centre, Manesar; Editor, Purity (Brahma Kumaris monthly); Columnist, The Times of India Speaking Tree
- Other names: BK Brij Mohan; Brijmohan Bhai
- Occupation: Spiritual leader; columnist

Religious life
- Denomination: Brahma Kumaris

Senior posting
- Post: Secretary General of the Brahma Kumaris
- Period in office: 2024–2025
- Predecessor: BK Nirwair

Brij Mohan (7 January 1934 – 9 October 2025), known within the Brahma Kumaris as BK Brij Mohan or Brijmohan Bhai, was an Indian spiritual leader who served from 2024 until his death in 2025 as the Secretary General of the Brahma Kumaris, a Mount Abubased new religious movement reported to operate about 6,000 service centres worldwide. A chartered accountant by training, he resigned in 1973 from a position as Finance Manager at the Fertiliser Corporation of India to dedicate himself full-time to the organisation, and over the following half-century became its Chief Spokesperson, Editor of the monthly Purity, a member of its Apex Committee, and Secretary of the Rajyoga Education and Research Foundation, a sister body of the Brahma Kumaris.

Brij Mohan was appointed Secretary General in 2024, succeeding BK Nirwair, who had died on 19 September 2024. At the time of his death he was also the Brahma Kumaris' Chief Spokesperson and National Head of its Political Service Wing, and a regular columnist for the "Speaking Tree" feature of The Times of India, for The Daily Guardian, and for the Brahma Kumaris monthly World Renewal.

== Early life and education ==
Brij Mohan was born on 7 January 1934 in Amritsar in the Punjab Province of British India. According to The Statesman, he was "inclined towards spirituality" from an early age and had read widely in the Hindu scriptural tradition. He graduated in 1953 with a Bachelor of Commerce (Honours) from the University of Delhi, and went on to obtain a Bachelor of Laws from the same university in 1955. In 1956 he qualified as a chartered accountant with the Institute of Chartered Accountants of India. He encountered the Brahma Kumaris in 1955, while still a student in Delhi.

== Career in the Fertiliser Corporation of India (1956–1973) ==
After qualifying as a chartered accountant, Brij Mohan joined the Fertiliser Corporation of India, a Government of India enterprise, where he served for seventeen years and rose to the post of Finance Manager. He continued to study Brahma Kumaris Raja Yoga meditation through the 1960s and early 1970s. In 1973 he resigned from the Corporation and dedicated himself full-time to the work of the Brahma Kumaris.

== Brahma Kumaris service ==
The Brahma Kumaris had been founded in 1936 in Hyderabad in Sindh by Brahma Baba, and had relocated its world headquarters to Mount Abu in Rajasthan in 1950 following the Partition of India. By the time of Brij Mohan's death the organisation operated about 6,000 service centres worldwide.

=== Principal Secretary and Chief Spokesperson ===
After his 1973 resignation from the Fertiliser Corporation, Brij Mohan held a series of administrative posts at the Brahma Kumaris world headquarters at Mount Abu, including Head of the Accounts Department and one of the organisation's Principal Secretaries. He served as Secretary of the Rajyoga Education and Research Foundation, a sister organisation of the Brahma Kumaris, and as a member of the Apex Committee of the Brahma Kumaris. He was widely identified in the Indian press as the organisation's Chief Spokesperson, a designation he himself used in author-credit lines for newspaper columns.

=== Godlywood Studio at the Om Shanti Retreat Centre ===
The Brahma Kumaris opened the Om Shanti Retreat Centre (ORC) at Manesar, near Gurugram in Haryana, in 2010 as the organisation's principal residential retreat venue in the National Capital Region. Brij Mohan served as the founding Director of Godlywood Studio at the ORC, in which capacity he commissioned and produced a number of short feature films and documentaries on social and spiritual themes.

=== Public roles in education and human values ===
Brij Mohan was a member of the Core Committee on Education in Human Values of the Ministry of Education, Government of India. Through the Brahma Kumaris and the Rajyoga Education and Research Foundation, he convened a long sequence of national seminars and conferences on values education, leadership ethics and the relationship between spirituality and public life.

== Secretary General (2024–2025) ==
The Brahma Kumaris' previous Secretary General, BK Nirwair (1938–2024), died on 19 September 2024. Following Nirwair's death, Brij Mohan was appointed as Secretary General. he had previously served as Additional Secretary General alongside Nirwair. In that capacity he was also Head of the Accounts Department and a member of the Brahma Kumaris' Management Committee. The Times of India was still publishing columns under his "secretary general" by-line as late as July 2025.

== Writing and journalism ==
Brij Mohan was the editor of the Brahma Kumaris' English-language monthly Purity, published from New Delhi, and a frequent contributor to the organisation's flagship monthly World Renewal. In the secular press, his by-line appeared regularly in the "Speaking Tree" column of The Times of India from at least 2014 onwards, and in The Daily Guardian. His pieces dealt mainly with Raja Yoga meditation, soul consciousness, ahinsa, and the application of spiritual ethics to public life.

== Death ==
On 8 October 2025 Brih Mohan's condition deteriorated suddenly and he was admitted to a private hospital in Manesar, where he died at 10:25 a.m. on 9 October 2025 at the age of 92.

His body was placed in public viewing at the Om Shanti Retreat Centre, Gurugram, on 9 and 10 October 2025, and was then taken to Pandav Bhawan in Mount Abu on 11 October. The cremation took place at the Brahma Kumaris' Muktidham at Shantivan, Abu Road, on 12 October 2025. A public memorial service, Snehanjali, was held at the Talkatora Stadium in New Delhi on 20 October 2025.

== See also ==
- Brahma Kumaris
- BK Brij Mohan
- BK Ramesh Shah
- Dadi Janki
- Dadi Ratan Mohini
- Om Shanti Retreat Centre
- Raja yoga
