= Dadi Gulzar =

Indian spiritual leader of the Brahma Kumaris (c. 1929–2021)

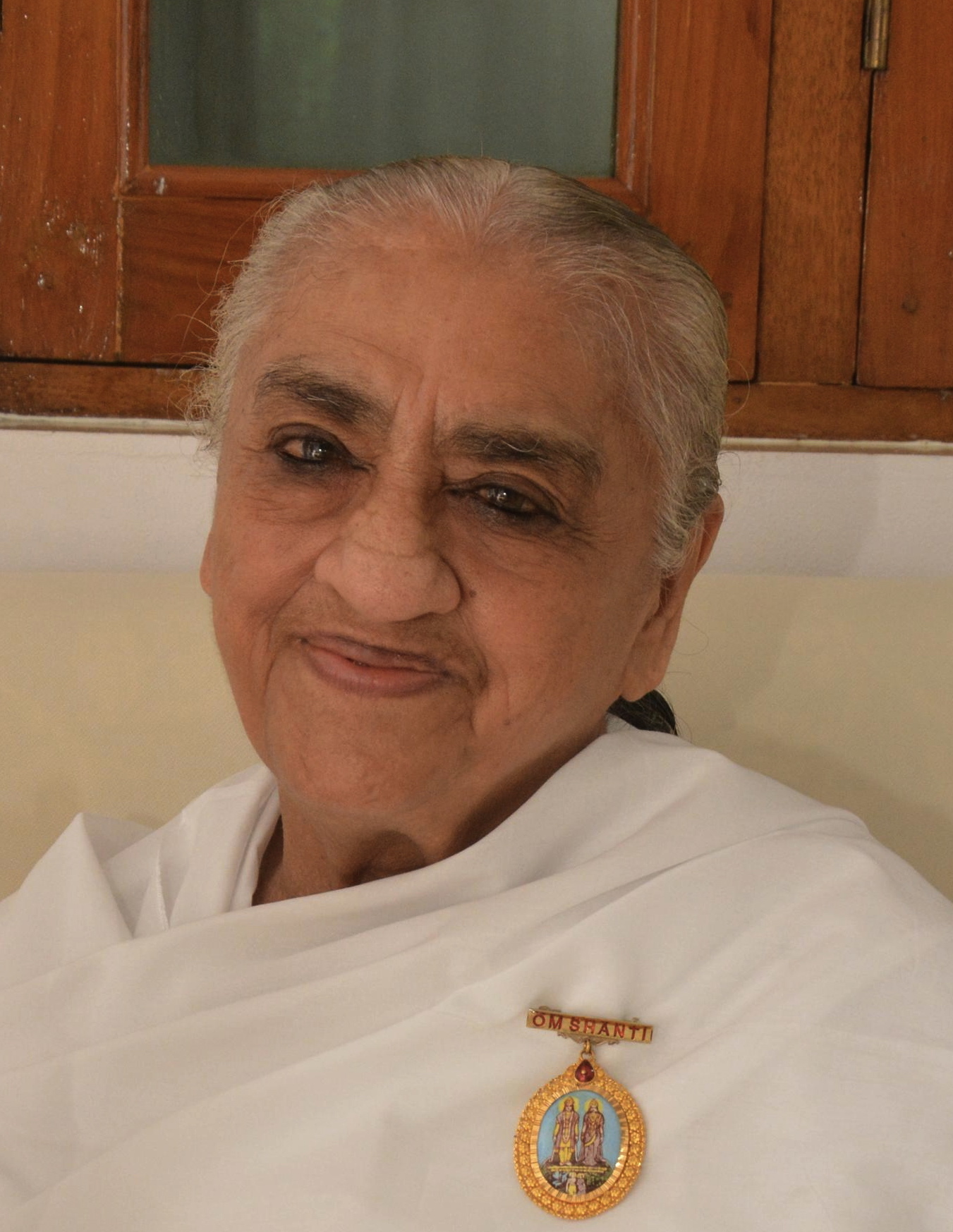
- Dadi Gulzar in September 2014
- Born: c. 1929
- Died: 11 March 2021; Saifee Hospital, Mumbai, Maharashtra, India
- Other names: Hridaya Mohini; Rajyogini Dadi Hriday Mohini
- Occupation: Spiritual leader
- Years active: c. 1937–2021
- Organization: Brahma Kumaris
- Known for: Head Administrator of the Brahma Kumaris (2020–2021); Delhi zonal head and chairperson of the Brahma Kumaris' cultural-services and business-and-industry-services wings; honorary D.Litt. from North Odisha University
- Predecessor: Dadi Janki
- Successor: Dadi Ratan Mohini
- Awards: Honorary Doctor of Literature, North Odisha University

Dadi Gulzar (c. 1929 – 11 March 2021), formally known as Rajyogini Dadi Hriday Mohini (also transliterated Hirdaya Mohini or Hridaya Mohini), was an Indian spiritual leader who served as the Head Administrator of the Brahma Kumaris from April 2020 until her death in 2021. She had joined the movement in 1937, when she was around eight years old, and remained associated with it throughout her life.

Within the Brahma Kumaris, Dadi Gulzar served as the Delhi zonal head and as chairperson of the organisation's cultural-services and business-and-industry-services wings before being appointed additional administrative head under Dadi Janki. Independent press obituaries credited her work with the expansion of the movement to more than 8,000 Raja Yoga centres in around 140 countries, and reported that she had been awarded an honorary Doctor of Literature degree by North Odisha University in Baripada, Mayurbhanj district, Odisha, for her work in spirituality and social service.

== Early life ==
Dadi Gulzar was born around 1929 and joined the Brahma Kumaris in 1937. She had been associated with the movement right from the inception since 1937, when she was eight years old, a date independently corroborated by The Tribune. The Brahma Kumaris movement was founded in 1936 in Hyderabad, Sindh by Lekhraj Kirpalani (Brahma Baba), and relocated its headquarters to Mount Abu in Rajasthan in 1950.

== Brahma Kumaris ==
Within the Brahma Kumaris, Dadi Gulzar served as the Delhi zonal head and as chairperson of the organisation's cultural-services and business-and-industry-services wings before being appointed additional administrative head under the leadership of Dadi Janki. Independent press obituaries credited her work with the expansion of the movement to more than 8,000 Raja Yoga centres in around 140 countries.

== Leadership as Head Administrator (2020–2021) ==
On 15 April 2020, Dadi Gulzar was appointed as the new Head Administrator of the organisation, following the death on 27 March 2020 of her predecessor, Dadi Janki. The Times of India described her in 2021 as the "global chief of Brahma Kumaris, the world's largest spiritual organisation run by women", and The Tribune likewise described the Brahma Kumaris, founded in 1937, as "the world's largest spiritual organization run entirely by women".

== Death ==
Dadi Gulzar died at Saifee Hospital in Mumbai on the morning of 11 March 2021 at the age of 93. Her death coincided with the Hindu festival of Maha Shivaratri, a coincidence noted in several condolence messages. Her body was taken to the Brahma Kumaris headquarters at Abu Road in Sirohi district, Rajasthan, where members of the public paid respects on 12 March, and her last rites were performed at the organisation's Shantivan campus on 13 March 2021.

== Tributes ==
Tributes from national constitutional authorities included those of Prime Minister Narendra Modi, who said that Dadi Gulzar "will be remembered for her numerous efforts to alleviate human suffering and further societal empowerment" and had "played a pivotal role in spreading the positive message of the Brahma Kumaris family globally", and Lok Sabha Speaker Om Birla, who described her in a condolence message as "an example of compassion, affection, simplicity, and empathy, who will always be remembered for her work and service to the people". The Governor of Rajasthan, Kalraj Mishra, and the Governor of Andhra Pradesh, Biswabhusan Harichandan, also condoled her death, with Harichandan stating that she had "devoted her life in the pursuit of intense spiritual endeavour, soul consciousness, spiritual attainment, meditation and to spread the positive message of the Brahma Kumaris' family globally".

The Chief Minister of Rajasthan, Ashok Gehlot, said that she had "devoted herself to the service of humanity and inspired people towards the spiritual path", and the Chief Minister of Chhattisgarh, Bhupesh Baghel, said in a Hindi-language tweet that she had "left this world on the auspicious occasion of Mahashivratri". The Indian National Congress leader Rahul Gandhi said she would "be remembered for her role in inspiring spiritual awakening", and the Telugu Desam Party president N. Chandrababu Naidu described her as "a living example of virtues" who had "inspired millions of people across the globe".

She was succeeded as Head Administrator of the Brahma Kumaris by Dadi Ratan Mohini.

== See also ==
- Brahma Kumaris
- Dadi Janki
- Dadi Prakashmani
- Dadi Ratan Mohini
- BK Jayanti
- BK Shivani
- Lekhraj Kripalani
- Raja Yoga
