= Global Co-operation House =

UK headquarters of the Brahma Kumaris in Willesden, London

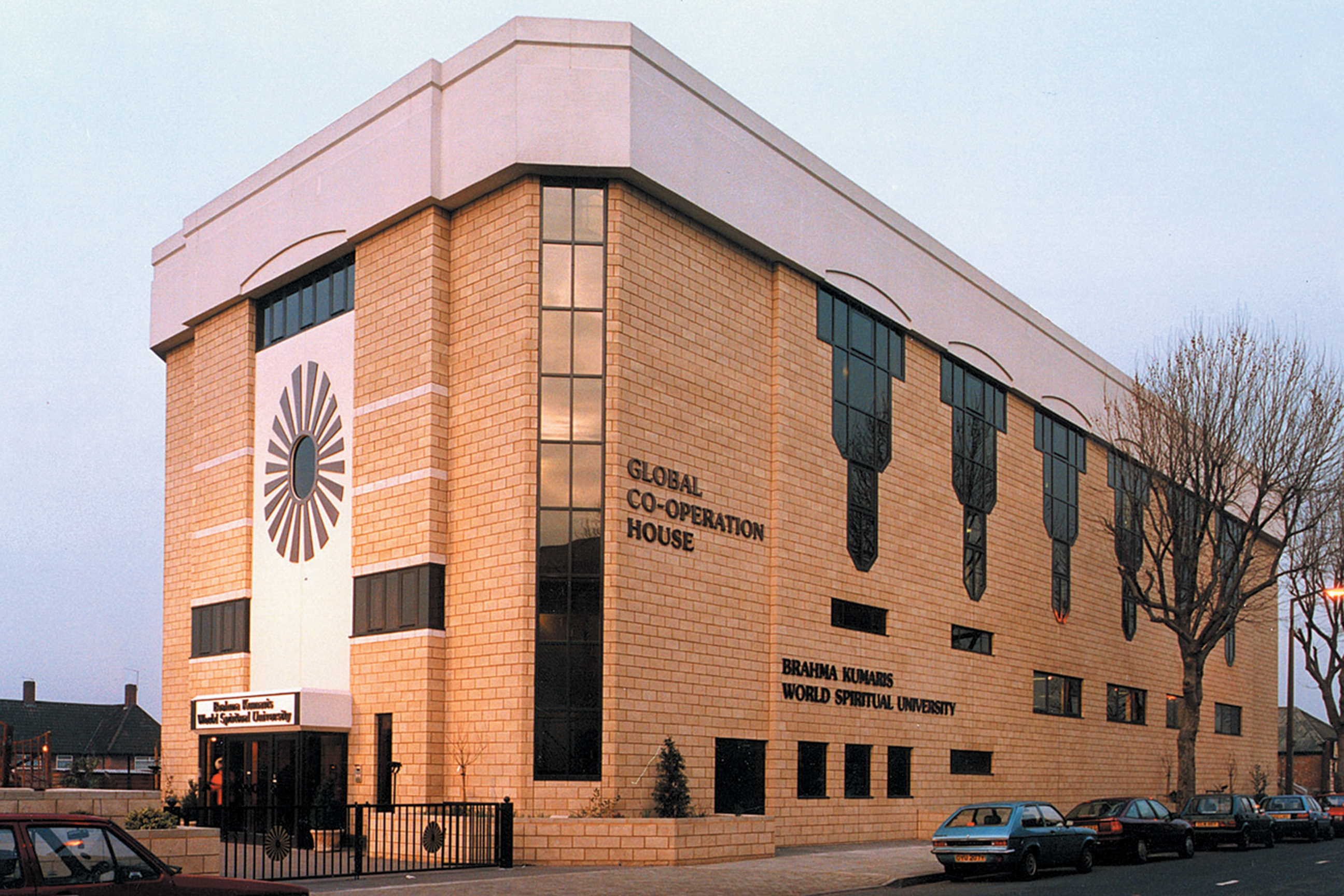
- Global Co-operation House on Pound Lane, Willesden, in 2026
- Interactive map of the Global Co-operation House area

General information
- Status: Active
- Type: Spiritual centre and conference facility
- Location: 65–69 Pound Lane, Willesden, London NW10 2HH, United Kingdom
- Coordinates: 51.5452°N 0.2373°W
- Current tenants: Brahma Kumaris World Spiritual University (UK)
- Completed: 1991
- Owner: Brahma Kumaris World Spiritual University (UK)

Design and construction
- Architects: A & N Architects

Website
- www.globalcooperationhouse.org

Global Co-operation House is the United Kingdom headquarters of the Brahma Kumaris World Spiritual University, located at 65–69 Pound Lane in Willesden, north-west London. The purpose-built centre was completed in 1991 and is the registered office of Brahma Kumaris World Spiritual University (UK), a registered charity in England and Wales.

The building serves both as the National Co-ordinating Office of the Brahma Kumaris in the United Kingdom and as the movement's international co-ordinating office, the base from which the organisation's activities in Europe and the Middle East are directed and from which it conducts its relations with the United Nations Economic and Social Council, with which the Brahma Kumaris has held General Consultative Status since 1998. The centre offers free courses in the movement's form of Raja Yoga meditation, along with talks, workshops and interfaith events open to the public and funded by voluntary contributions. It has been used to host a number of national interfaith and community events, the best documented of which is the British launch in January 1993 of the United Nations–recognised Year of Inter-religious Understanding and Co-operation, organised by the World Congress of Faiths.

== History ==
=== Background ===
The Brahma Kumaris movement began operating in Britain in 1971, the year it first established centres outside India. Brahma Kumaris World Spiritual University (UK) was registered as a charity in England and Wales in 1975. Senior figures associated with the British movement have included Dadi Janki, who represented the Brahma Kumaris in the United Kingdom from its early years, and Sister Jayanti, the organisation's European Director.

=== Naming and 1988 namesake project ===
The building takes its name from the international Global Co-operation for a Better World initiative, which the Brahma Kumaris launched from the Houses of Parliament in London in April 1988 as a follow-up to its UN-recognised Million Minutes of Peace appeal of 1986. Designated by the United Nations as a Peace Messenger Initiative, the project gathered written and visual contributions on the theme of a "better world" from individuals in 129 countries; the responses were synthesised into a publication, Visions of a Better World, presented to the United Nations Secretary-General.

=== Construction and opening ===
Global Co-operation House was completed in 1991 and, according to the organisation, was funded by voluntary donations from members and supporters of the movement worldwide. The Brahma Kumaris mark 5 September 1991 as the date of the centre's opening. A further teaching and conference building, named Diamond House, was added on the same site in 2003. In September 2021 the organisation marked the 30th anniversary of the building's opening with an in-person and online gathering led by Sister Jayanti.

The centre is the registered office of Brahma Kumaris World Spiritual University (UK), which stated that it operated through more than 40 locations across the UK with four trustees and around 395 volunteers.

== Building ==
=== Architecture ===
The centre was designed by the London-based practice A & N Architects, with its principal entrance on Pound Lane. The interior includes a main auditorium, meeting and meditation rooms, exhibition spaces and a bookshop.

=== Diamond House ===
Diamond House, a separate teaching and conference annexe completed in 2003, extends the original 1991 building and provides additional seminar and meeting space on the same Pound Lane site.

== Activities ==
=== Role in the Brahma Kumaris organisation ===
Global Co-operation House serves as the National Co-ordinating Office of the Brahma Kumaris in the UK and as the movement's international co-ordinating office. Sister Jayanti, the Brahma Kumaris' European Director and one of its additional administrative heads, is based at the centre, from which she also serves as the organisation's representative to the United Nations Office at Geneva. The Brahma Kumaris was affiliated to the UN Department of Public Information in September 1980, was granted Roster Consultative Status by ECOSOC in 1983, and was upgraded to General Consultative Status in July 1998.

In January 2018 Sister Jayanti led morning meditation sessions for delegates at the World Economic Forum annual meeting in Davos, an event covered by the BBC News, which identified her as European director of the Brahma Kumaris. The Brahma Kumaris UK has also taken part in interfaith roundtables convened by the UK Department for Business, Energy and Industrial Strategy in the run-up to the 2021 UN Climate Change Conference (COP26).

=== Membership and public courses ===
According to the academic Critical Dictionary of Apocalyptic and Millenarian Movements, the Brahma Kumaris ran more than 40 centres across Britain as of 2021 and had reported approximately 1,500 active members and 100 teachers in Britain in 2004. The centre's principal public offering is a free seven-day introductory course in the Brahma Kumaris' form of Raja Yoga meditation, supported by regular drop-in meditation sessions, talks and workshops on themes such as positive thinking, stress management and self-esteem; all activities are offered without charge and funded by voluntary contributions.

== Notable events ==
=== 1993 Launch of the Year of Inter-religious Understanding and Co-operation ===
Global Co-operation House hosted the British national launch of the Year of Inter-religious Understanding and Co-operation on 27 January 1993, organised by the World Congress of Faiths to mark the centenary of the 1893 World's Parliament of Religions in Chicago. The day-long event was attended by around 800 people from across Britain and abroad, and was opened with welcomes by Lord Ennals, who chaired the WCF planning committee, and Dadi Janki of the Brahma Kumaris.

Morning addresses were given by Bishop Trevor Huddleston, the social anthropologist Mai Yamani, Rabbi Hugo Gryn, Swami Bhavyananda of the Ramakrishna Vedanta Centre in Britain and the Apollo XIV astronaut Edgar Mitchell; the morning programme also included an interfaith Water Ceremony and a dramatisation of the 1893 Parliament performed by Jane Lapotaire, Clarke Peters and Robin Ramsay. The evening cultural programme featured readings by Hayley Mills and John Cleese from Sogyal Rinpoche's The Tibetan Book of Living and Dying, performances by Tibetan and Thai children, and a closing performance of "Sacred Stones" by Sheila Chandra.

=== Community and cultural events ===
The centre regularly hosts community, interfaith and cultural events. In December 2013 it staged Wondariya and the Secret of the Diamond, a community pantomime co-written and co-directed by local residents and performed by sixteen Brahma Kumaris students with nine children; the production was reported to have been seen by about 3,500 people across three evenings, with the audience including the leader of Brent Council, Muhammed Butt, and the Mayor of Brent, Bobby Thomas.

During the COVID-19 pandemic, the centre adapted its public programme to an online format. In November 2020 it hosted a pupil-led online event, Responding to COVID: Meeting the Needs of our Youth, chaired by the Brent councillor Ketan Sheth, with messages from the Mayor of Brent Ernest Ezeajughi and a guided meditation led by Sister Jayanti.

In 2022 the centre's Sister Maureen Goodman joined an interfaith delegation, which also included the former Archbishop of Canterbury Rowan Williams, that travelled to Ukraine to meet displaced families and visit an orphanage near the Romanian border in response to the Russian invasion of Ukraine.

== See also ==
- Brahma Kumaris
- BK Jayanti
- Dadi Janki
