= BK Ramesh Shah =

Indian chartered accountant and Brahma Kumaris administrator (1934–2017)

Personal life
- Born: Ramesh Nanalal Shah; 5 February 1934 India
- Died: 28 January 2017 (aged 82) Abu Road, Rajasthan, India
- Resting place: Mukti Dham, Amthala, Abu Road
- Spouse: B.K. Usha R. Shah (d. 2011)
- Known for: Founding Managing Trustee, World Renewal Spiritual Trust (1968); Founder of Godlywood Studio (2012); Editor of New Light for a Better World (1995)
- Other names: Rameshbhaiji; B.K. Ramesh N. Shah
- Occupation: Chartered accountant; spiritual administrator

Religious life
- Denomination: Brahma Kumaris

Senior posting
- Post: Additional Secretary General of the Brahma Kumaris
- Period in office: until 2017

Ramesh Nanalal Shah (5 February 1934 – 28 January 2017), commonly known as BK Ramesh Shah or Ramesh bhai, was an Indian chartered accountant and senior administrator of the Brahma Kumaris movement. A long-time Mumbai practitioner who joined the organisation as a young man in the 1950s, he served as the founding Managing Trustee of its World Renewal Spiritual Trust (WRST) and as an Additional Secretary General of the parent body, the Prajapita Brahma Kumaris Ishwariya Vishwa Vidyalaya, until his death. He was also the founder of the Brahma Kumaris' in-house Godlywood Studio at Abu Road, and the editor of New Light for a Better World (1995), a Brahma Kumaris collection that has been cited in academic studies of the movement.

== Early life and education ==
Shah was born on 5 February 1934 into a Gujarati family; his mother was Shanta Devi. He took a commerce degree in 1954, and qualified as a chartered accountant under the Institute of Chartered Accountants of India in 1956. He subsequently did postgraduate study in Eastern and Western philosophy and undertook a comparative reading of the world's principal religions.

== Professional career ==
Ramesh practised in Mumbai as a chartered accountant; his firm, Ramesh Shah & Co., is named in published notices of his death as the practice he led. The Brahma Kumaris' Godlywood biographical note also describes him as having taught advanced accounts, auditing and taxation part-time at the University of Bombay in the early part of his career.

== Brahma Kumaris ==
Ramesh first came into contact with the movement's founder Brahma Baba in 1953, accompanying his mother Shanta Devi, and was formally dedicated as a Brahma Kumar in May 1961. In 1964 he organised the first public Brahma Kumaris exhibition in Mumbai under the direction of Brahma Baba.

A Brahma Kumaris history of the movement's overseas expansion lists "Brothers Jagdish and Ramesh, Sisters Sheil Indra, Rosie and Nirmala" as the delegation of five sent from India in 1971 to support the early Raja Yoga centre at Tennyson Road, Kilburn, in London.

In March 2002, The Times of India's Pune Times edition reported on a conference at the Pune District Central Cooperative (PDCC) Bank, organised by the Brahma Kumaris for members of the legal fraternity, at which Shah described as an "advocate" and as "chairperson of the jurist's wing of Mumbai" and delivered the keynote address on spiritual empowerment in the administration of justice, citing the example of Mahatma Gandhi as a lawyer. The following January the Sri Lankan news service TamilNet covered an address by Shah and his wife BK Usha at the management centre of the North-East Provincial Ministry of Education in Sri Lanka, where Shah argued that religious leaders had a responsibility to work for peace rather than to instigate sectarian violence.

== World Renewal Spiritual Trust ==
Ramesh was the founding Managing Trustee of the World Renewal Spiritual Trust, which was registered in Bombay in December 1968 as a public charitable trust to hold the property and to undertake the social-service work of the Brahma Kumaris. The trust was incorporated in the weeks immediately before Brahma Baba's death on 18 January 1969. The trust was subsequently recognised by India's Department of Scientific and Industrial Research as a Scientific and Industrial Research Organisation in 2011. Ramesh continued as the trust's Managing Trustee until his death.

== Administrative and editorial roles ==
In addition to his trusteeship of World Renewal Spiritual Trust, Ramesh held several concurrent positions within the wider Brahma Kumaris apparatus: Additional Secretary General of the parent Prajapita Brahma Kumaris Ishwariya Vishwa Vidyalaya; Organising Secretary of the Brahma Kumaris' Rajyoga Education and Research Foundation and Director of its Art and Culture Wing; Secretary of the Brahma Kumaris Educational Society; Chairperson of the organisation's Jurists Wing and of its Spiritual Applications Research Centre (SpARC); Secretary of the Brahma Kumaris-run community radio station Radio Madhuban (90.4 FM); and trustee of the Shri Shiv Adhyatmik Foundation. He was also editor of the Brahma Kumaris newspaper Swarnim Sanskruti Kala Sandesh.

== Godlywood Studio ==
In 2012, Ramesh conceived and initiated the Brahma Kumaris' in-house television and film production facility, Godlywood Studio, at the Manmohinivan Complex within the Shantivan campus at Abu Road. The trade press in the UK and the United States covered the studio's opening: the US magazine Mix and the UK industry news service 4rfv.co.uk both reported in 2013 that, under Ramesh's brief to build a "world-class studio", the facility had become the first installation in India of Harman's Studer Vista 1 digital mixing console, with the implementation overseen by Harilal Bhanushali (BK Harilal). Ramesh continued as the studio's chairman.

== Writings ==
Ramesh edited New Light for a Better World (Mount Abu: Prajapita Brahma Kumaris Ishwariya Vishwa Vidyalaya, 1995), a Brahma Kumaris collection that has been cited as a source in academic literature on the movement, including a doctoral dissertation in religious studies at the University of North Carolina at Chapel Hill. He was also the author of a Hindi book on spiritual economics, Pavitra Dhan (Pure Wealth), published in Delhi by the Brahma Kumaris Ishwariya Vishwa Vidyalaya; according to the publisher's note, the book grew out of a series of essays Shah wrote over about five years in the Brahma Kumaris Hindi monthly Gyanamrit.

== Personal life and death ==
Shah was married to Usha R. Shah, who predeceased him in 2011; the couple lived at Devchhaya, near Haji Ali in Mumbai. He died there at 7:23 am on Saturday, 28 January 2017, aged 82. His last rites were performed the next afternoon at the Mukti Dham cemetery at Amthala, near Abu Road. The Times of India carried a death notice from the Brahma Kumaris on 28 January 2017 and a prayer-meeting notice on 7 February 2017, the latter signed jointly by the head of the Brahma Kumaris, Dadi Janki, its Maharashtra zone in-charge and Shah's own firm, Ramesh Shah & Co.

== See also ==
- Brahma Kumaris
- Dadi Janki
- Raja Yoga
- BK Brij Mohan
- BK Nirwair
