= Om Radhe =

First administrative head of the Brahma Kumaris (1916-1965)

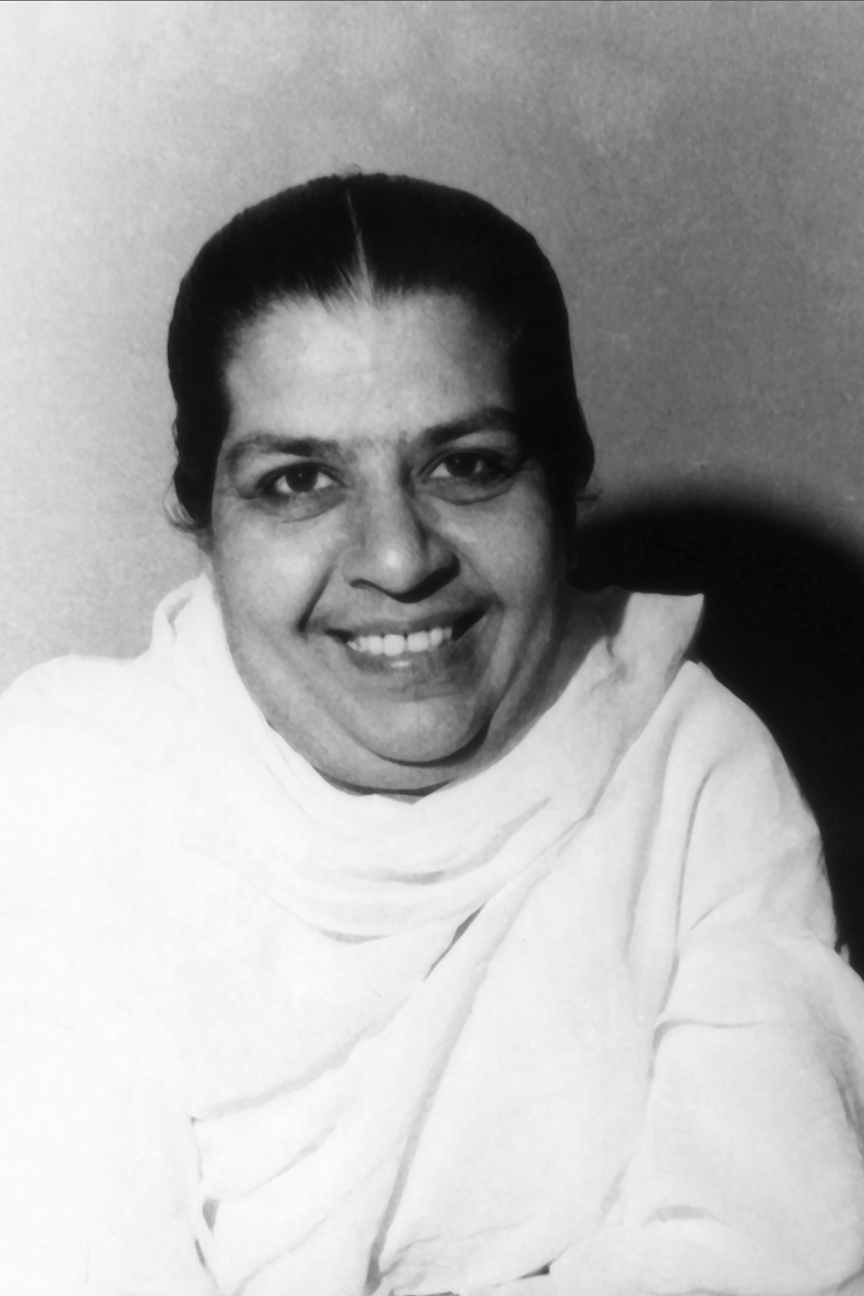
- Om Radhe c. 1960s

Personal life
- Born: Radhe Pokardas Rajwani c. 1916 Amritsar, Punjab, British India
- Died: 24 June 1965 Mount Abu, Rajasthan, India
- Resting place: Pandav Bhawan (Madhuban), Mount Abu, Rajasthan, India
- Known for: First administrative head of the Brahma Kumaris; Author of Is This Justice? (1939); Lead respondent in the 1938-1939 Om Mandali court proceedings in Sind
- Other names: Mateshwari Saraswati; Jagadamba Saraswati; Mamma

Religious life
- Denomination: Brahma Kumaris

Senior posting
- Post: First Administrative Head, Prajapita Brahma Kumaris Ishwariya Vishwa Vidyalaya
- Period in office: 1937-1965
- Successor: Dadi Prakashmani

Om Radhe (born Radhe Pokardas Rajwani; c. 1916 – 24 June 1965), known within the Brahma Kumaris as Mateshwari Saraswati, Jagadamba and most familiarly as Mamma ("mother"), was an Indian religious administrator and the first administrative head of the Brahma Kumaris.

In October 1937, when she was about twenty-two, the founder, Lekhraj Kripalani (later known as Brahma Baba), transferred his personal fortune to a managing committee of eight women drawn from his early followers and named Om Radhe as its president; from this point until her death she served as the institution's administrative head, while Brahma Baba himself held no executive office. She led the Om Mandali, as the movement was then known, through the controversies and court cases of 1938–1939 in Hyderabad and Karachi during which the group's teaching of female chastity drew sustained legal and political opposition, testified before the City Magistrate at Hyderabad in early 1939, appealed unsuccessfully to the Sind High Court against the order and authored the August 1939 pamphlet "Is This Justice?" as a direct refutation of the Sind Government's tribunal of inquiry into the Om Mandali.

The movement remained in Karachi from 1938 until 1950, when it relocated to Mount Abu in Rajasthan, Om Radhe continued as administrative head at the Pandav Bhawan headquarters at Mount Abu until her death on 24 June 1965, after which the office passed to Dadi Prakashmani. She is regarded within the Brahma Kumaris as the "World Mother" (Jagadamba), and 24 June is observed annually by the movement as her remembrance day, the observances of her 57th, 59th and 60th anniversaries (2022, 2024, 2025) drew coverage in Indian national-language press including Hindustan and Dainik Bhaskar.

== Early life ==
She was born Radhe Pokardas Rajwani around 1916 in Amritsar in Punjab to Pokardas and Rocha; she was the middle of three sisters, and after the death of her father moved with her mother to Hyderabad in Sind, where she was educated at the Kundan Mall Model School up to matriculation. (Note: Independent press accounts give her dates as 1916–1965 (Dawn, 2018) or 1915–1965, while Brahma Kumaris-published biographical literature gives her year of birth as 1919. Sind newspapers contemporary with the 1938–1939 court proceedings recorded her age as about twenty-two when she was named president of the managing committee in October 1937, which is consistent with a year of birth around 1916.) She belonged to the Sindhi Hindu Bhaiband mercantile community, the same community as the founder Lekhraj Kripalani.

== Joining the Om Mandali ==
The Om Mandali emerged out of the daily satsangs that Brahma Baba began holding at his Hyderabad home from about 1936. By 1937 the gathering had attracted some three hundred adherents. Om Radhe joined as a teenager and rapidly emerged as one of the senior pupils of the satsang on account of her ability to retain and revise the discourses Brahma Baba delivered.

== Administrative head of the Om Mandali (1937) ==
In October 1937, Brahma Baba transferred his personal fortune to a managing committee drawn from his early students, dissolving his commercial interests, and the gathering was formally constituted as the Prajapita Brahma Kumaris Ishwariya Vishwa Vidyalaya. Om Radhe was the president of the eight-member managing committee, with Brahma Baba himself holding no executive office. Several scholars of the movement have remarked that the women-led administrative structure inaugurated in October 1937, with a young woman in her early twenties at its head, was historically unusual in the patriarchal Sindhi milieu of the period and that the pattern of female-led administration has been maintained by the Brahma Kumaris ever since.

== Court proceedings and public defence (1938–1939) ==
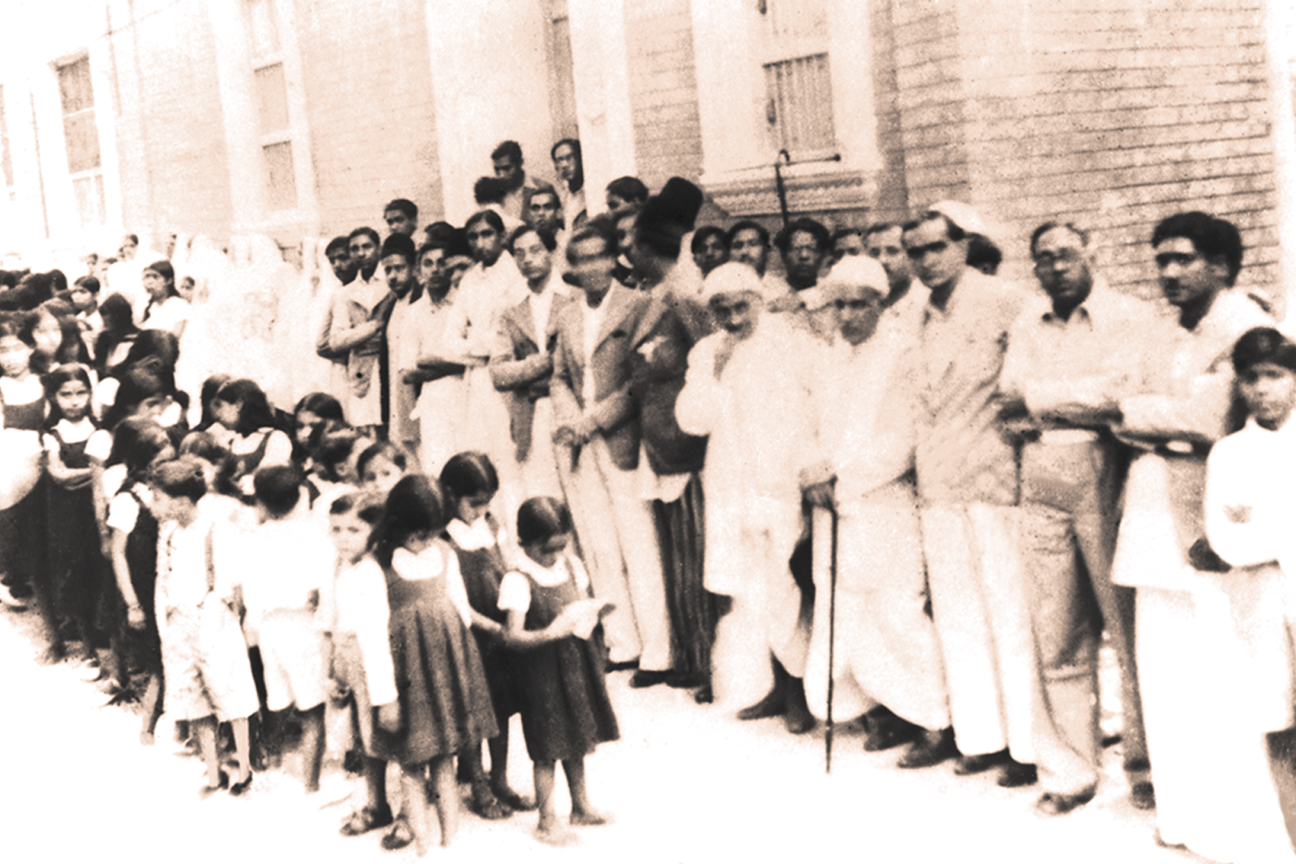
Members of the Anti-Om Mandali Committee picketing the Om Mandali's premises at Hyderabad, Sind, 1938. The picketing led directly to the 1938–1939 court proceedings in which Om Radhe appeared as president of the Om Mandali.

The Om Mandali's teaching that women could choose religious devotion and marital chastity took an unusual position in the Sindhi Hindu society of the period. In 1938, after picketing of the institution's Hyderabad premises by an "Anti-Om Mandali Committee" of male family members, the dispute moved into the courts.

=== Vindication in the Sind High Court (1938) ===
On 16 August 1938 the District Magistrate at Hyderabad ordered that the Om Mandali be prevented from meeting. The order was reversed on 21 November 1938 by the Court of the Judicial Commissioner of Sind, the bench observing that "if we were to accept the position taken by the district magistrate, a few persons of conservative minds and not averse to violence could successfully obstruct any social movement of reforms by obstructing and wrongfully restraining the social reformers." Following the ruling, the community relocated some three hundred members from Hyderabad to Karachi.

=== Sind Assembly debate and Is This Justice? (1939) ===
In March 1939 the Government of Sind appointed a tribunal to inquire into the institution's affairs. On 24 March 1939, in a debate on the matter in the Sind Legislative Assembly, the Minister for Law and Order, Sir Ghulam Hussain Hidayatullah (later the first Governor of Sind), defended the right of the Om Mandali to practise its faith, asking the House: "Because those poor women are only a handful, should we take the law into our hands and prevent their liberty?" and concluding: "we should give liberty to all castes and communities, irrespective of the opinion of the majority." The Karachi English-language daily The Daily Gazette editorially supported the Om Mandali during this period as well, characterising the Government's resort to the Criminal Law Amendment Act of 1908 as an infringement of the civil liberties to which Indians were entitled.

In May 1939 the Government formally declared the Om Mandali an unlawful association under the 1908 Act, but the order was never actively enforced and the community continued its work uninterrupted. In August 1939, Om Radhe published from Karachi the pamphlet Is This Justice? Being an Account of the Founding of the Om Mandli & the Om Nivas and Their Suppression, by Application of the Criminal Law Amendment Act of 1908, which set out the institution's account of the events of 1937–1939 and remains the only contemporaneous Om Mandali record of the proceedings. Subsequent academic studies of the movement's origins have followed the November 1938 judgment of the Court of the Judicial Commissioner in characterising the early Om Mandali as a women-led social-reform community, rather than the threat to public order that its critics had alleged.

== Karachi years (1939–1950) ==
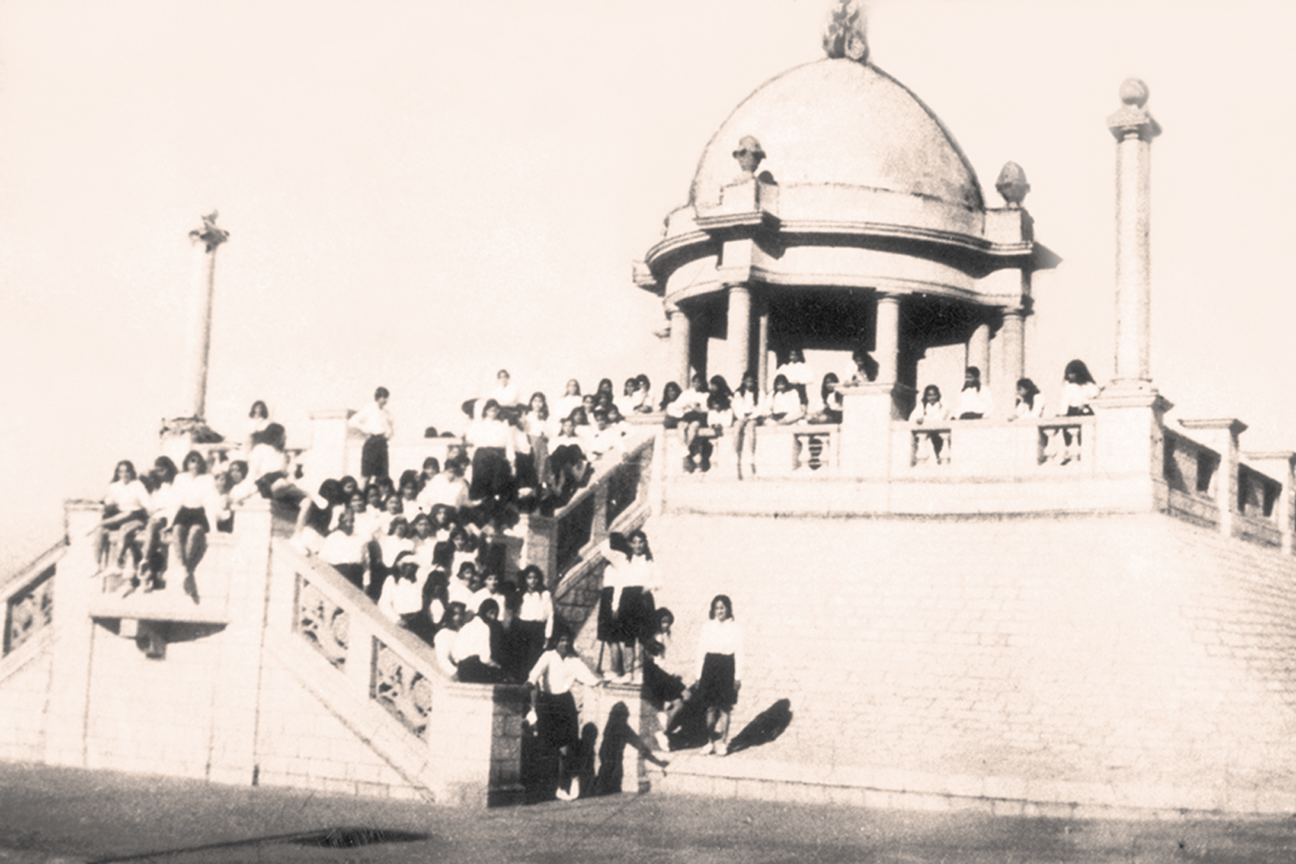
Om Mandali members on an outing at Clifton Beach, Karachi, c. 1940. The community remained in Karachi from 1938 until its move to Mount Abu in 1950, with Om Radhe managing its day-to-day affairs.

The Om Mandali continued to hold its satsangs and to operate from a structured ashram in Karachi. During the Second World War the group remained in Karachi and was largely insulated from the broader political ferment of the period.

In 1943 Om Radhe wrote a second pamphlet, This Preordained World-Wide War of Mahabharata and its Result, which was published from Karachi by the Avinashi Gyan Yagya and offered the Om Mandali's eschatological reading of the war as the prelude to a new "Golden Age" of the kalpa cycle taught by the movement.

== Move to Mount Abu (1950) ==
Two and a half years after the partition of India in August 1947, on 5 May 1950, the founder, Om Radhe and the senior adherents relocated the community from Karachi to the hill station of Mount Abu in southern Rajasthan, taking the lease of a property on Sunset Road that became known as Pandav Bhawan and, more broadly, as Madhuban ("forest of honey"). Pandav Bhawan has remained the spiritual headquarters of the Brahma Kumaris ever since. Brahma Kumaris-published accounts state that during the move and in the years immediately following, Om Radhe was responsible for the financial management of the community.

== Stewardship at Madhuban (1950–1965) ==
From Mount Abu, Om Radhe continued as administrative head of the institution while the founder conducted daily murli classes for resident adherents and an expanding visitor community. A more structured introductory course in the movement's Raja Yoga was offered to the public from 1952, and the movement began to send teachers from Madhuban to establish satellite centres in other Indian cities during the 1950s and 1960s, although large-scale international expansion only began after the founder's death in 1969. Within the movement Om Radhe came in this period to be referred to as Mateshwari ("revered mother"), Saraswati (the Hindu goddess of knowledge) and Jagadamba ("World Mother"), and most familiarly as Mamma.

== Death ==
Om Radhe was diagnosed with cancer in the early 1960s. According to Brahma Kumaris-published accounts of her last day, she met members of the community at Pandav Bhawan on the morning of 24 June 1965 and died at the Mount Abu headquarters that afternoon, at the age of about forty-five. Following her death, administrative responsibility for the institution passed to a small group of senior women adherents from the original Hyderabad cohort, with Dadi Prakashmani – who had been a teenage member of the founding 1937 managing committee – emerging as the chief administrator after the founder's own death in January 1969.

== Works ==
- Radhe, Om (1939). Is This Justice? Being an Account of the Founding of the Om Mandli & the Om Nivas and Their Suppression, by Application of the Criminal Law Amendment Act of 1908. Karachi: Pharmacy Printing Press, Bunder Road.
- Radhe, Om (1943). This Preordained World-Wide War of Mahabharata and its Result. Karachi: Avinashi Gyan Yagya.

== Legacy ==
The Brahma Kumaris regard Om Radhe as the "World Mother" (Jagadamba) and observe 24 June each year as her remembrance day, designated within the movement as Adhyatmik Gyan Diwas ("Spiritual Knowledge Day"); the 53rd commemoration in 2018 drew more than ten thousand adherents to the Diamond Hall at Shantivan, Abu Road, and her 57th remembrance day in 2022 was attended at Mount Abu by the former Chief Minister of Rajasthan Vasundhara Raje together with several sitting members of the Rajasthan Legislative Assembly and parliamentarians from southern Rajasthan.

== See also ==
- Brahma Kumaris
- Dadi Prakashmani
- Raja yoga (Brahma Kumaris)
- Hindu reform movements
- New religious movement
