= BK Jayanti =

British-Indian spiritual teacher and Brahma Kumaris leader

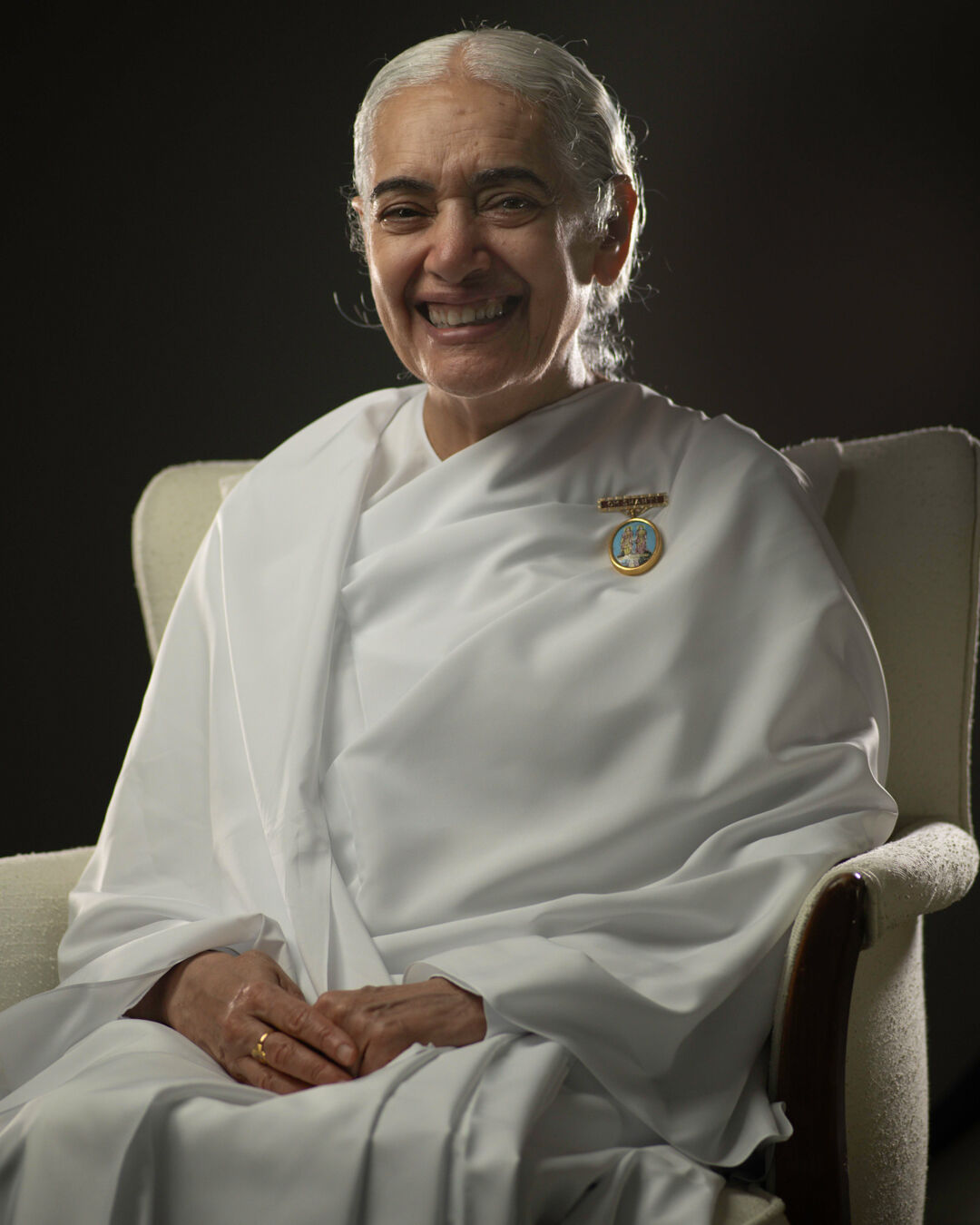
- BK Jayanti in 2022
- Born: Jayanti Kirpalani; 1949 (age 76–77); Pune, India
- Other names: Sister Jayanti; BK Jayanti
- Occupations: Spiritual teacher, meditation teacher, author
- Employer: Brahma Kumaris
- Known for: Additional administrative head of the Brahma Kumaris; Regional coordination of Brahma Kumaris activities in Europe and the Middle East; representative to the United Nations Office at Geneva
- Website: www.bkjayanti.org; BK Sister Jayanti

Jayanti Kirpalani (born 1949), also known as Sister Jayanti, Rajyogini Sister Jayanti or BK Jayanti, is a British spiritual teacher of Indian origin and a senior leader of the Brahma Kumaris. She is the organisation's additional administrative head, the regional director for its activities in Europe and the Middle East, and its representative to the United Nations in Geneva, a role she has held since 1982. She has led the organisation's delegation to the UN Climate Change Conferences since 2009 and led morning meditation sessions at the World Economic Forum annual meeting in Davos in 2018.

== Early life ==
Sister Jayanti was born in Poona (now Pune), India, in 1949 to a Sindhi Hindu family. Her family moved to London when she was eight. She attended Orange Hill Girls Grammar School in Edgware, where she has said she was the only Indian girl in the school, and went on to study pharmacy at the School of Pharmacy in Brunswick Square, part of the University of London.

== Brahma Kumaris ==
Sister Jayanti began teaching Raja yoga meditation in London in 1971. For many years she worked closely with Dadi Janki, who became the Brahma Kumaris' chief administrator in 2007 and served as her mentor. She directs the Brahma Kumaris' work in Europe and the Middle East as regional coordinator, based at Global Co-operation House in Willesden Green, London—the organisation's international coordinating office. She also serves as one of the Brahma Kumaris' additional administrative heads, with coordinating responsibility across the worldwide organisation. Since 1982 she has also represented the Brahma Kumaris at the United Nations in Geneva.

The Brahma Kumaris holds General Consultative Status with the United Nations Economic and Social Council and is registered as a non-governmental organisation with the United Nations Department of Global Communications.

== Public profile ==
=== Davos 2018 ===
In January 2018, Sister Jayanti led morning meditation sessions at the World Economic Forum annual meeting in Davos, Switzerland. The BBC, reporting from the meeting, identified her as "European director of Brahma Kumaris World Spiritual University" and described a session attended by approximately forty delegates. A contemporaneous Agence France-Presse wire-service report carried by The Straits Times described her as the "meditation leader" guiding delegates towards inner peace.

=== Climate advocacy ===
Sister Jayanti has led the Brahma Kumaris delegation to the United Nations Climate Change Conferences (UNFCCC Conferences of the Parties) since 2009, speaking on behalf of the organisation at successive sessions. Her participation forms part of the UNFCCC Interfaith Liaison Committee, the body that coordinates engagement by faith-based observer organisations in UN climate negotiations. At COP28 in Dubai in December 2023, she spoke at an Interfaith Liaison Committee press conference convened by the ACT Alliance alongside representatives of the World Council of Churches, Soka Gakkai International and Climate Action Network International, calling for stronger action on climate justice. Her advocacy at these forums emphasises a connection between climate action and inner change, arguing that materialistic consumption patterns are a driver of the environmental crisis.

== Publications ==
Sister Jayanti is the author of more than a dozen books on Raja Yoga meditation and spirituality, published mainly through John Hunt Publishing's O Books imprint and through Sterling Publishing.

Selected titles:

- Practical Meditation: Spiritual Yoga for the Mind (Sterling Publishing, 2009; ISBN 978-1-4027-6626-8)
- Awaken Your Inner Wisdom (O Books, 2010; ISBN 978-1-84694-497-0)
- Why Women Believe in God (with Liz Hodgkinson; Circle Books, 2012; ISBN 978-1-78099-222-8)
- Everyone Can Meditate
- Journey into Inner Space
- The Art of Thinking
- Spirituality in Daily Life
- Dreams and Reality
- God's Healing Power

== See also ==
- Brahma Kumaris
- Lekhraj Kripalani
- Dadi Janki
- Dadi Prakashmani
- Dadi Gulzar
- Dadi Ratan Mohini
- BK Shivani
- Raja Yoga Meditation
