= BK Nirwair =

Indian spiritual leader and Brahma Kumaris Secretary-General (1938–2024)

Personal life
- Born: Nirwair Singh; 20 November 1938 Mukerian, Hoshiarpur, Punjab, British India
- Died: 19 September 2024 (aged 85) Ahmedabad, Gujarat, India
- Resting place: Mukti Dham, Abu Road, Rajasthan, India
- Known for: Secretary-General of the Brahma Kumaris; Managing Trustee, Global Hospital and Research Centre, Mount Abu; Indian Navy service, including the Goa Liberation (1961)
- Other names: Nirwair Bhai; Brahma Kumar Nirwair
- Occupation: Spiritual leader; former Indian Navy serviceman

Religious life
- Religion: Hinduism
- Denomination: Brahma Kumaris

Religious career
- Post: Secretary-General of the Brahma Kumaris
- Period in office: until 2024

Nirwair Singh (20 November 1938 – 19 September 2024), known as BK Nirwair, was an Indian spiritual leader and former member of the Indian Navy who served as the Secretary-General of the Brahma Kumaris until his death in September 2024. He concurrently held the role of Managing Trustee of the Brahma Kumaris-affiliated Global Hospital and Research Centre at Mount Abu.

Born in Mukerian in the Hoshiarpur district of Punjab, Nirwair served in the Indian Navy for nine years – before joining the Brahma Kumaris movement, with which he was associated from 1959 onwards. In 1982, he represented the Brahma Kumaris at the United Nations Second Special Session on Disarmament.

== Early life and education ==
Nirwair Singh was born on 20 November 1938 in Mukerian, in Hoshiarpur district, Punjab (then part of British India), into a Hindu family. He studied at a local high school and then at DAV College, Mukerian, where he developed an interest in philosophy and religious literature and studied about Swami Vivekananda, Swami Rama Tirtha, Mahatma Gandhi and Sarvepalli Radhakrishnan.

== Indian Navy ==
After completing his college degree, Nirwair joined the Indian Navy and served for nine years, training as an electronics engineer. During this period he took part in the Goa Liberation in 1961, the Indian military operation that ended four-and-a-half centuries of Portuguese rule over Goa, Daman and Diu.

== Brahma Kumaris ==
Nirwair first encountered the Brahma Kumaris in 1959, when a centre of the movement opened in his home region of Punjab and he attended its classes as a spiritual seeker, He remained associated with the organisation from that time onwards. From 1974, he played an important role in overseeing the establishment of the Brahma Kumaris' principal campuses, which are located at Abu Road and Mount Abu in Rajasthan.

Nirwair served as Secretary-General of the Brahma Kumaris and as Managing Trustee of the organisation's J. Watumull Global Hospital and Research Centre at Mount Abu, a position recorded by The Tribune as exemplifying what the paper called his "commitment to promoting health and spirituality".

=== United Nations and international representation ===
In 1982 Nirwair represented the Brahma Kumaris World Spiritual University at the United Nations' Second Special Session on Disarmament (SSOD II), held at UN Headquarters in New York City, and that he met the then Secretary-General of the United Nations, Javier Pérez de Cuéllar, and other dignitaries on that occasion. The Brahma Kumaris had been granted consultative status with the United Nations Department of Public Information in 1980, and were subsequently granted UN ECOSOC consultative status in 1983.

== Awards and recognition ==
Nirwair received the "Rising Personalities of India Award" from International Penguin Publishing House in 1999, and that in 2001 he was honoured with the Gujarat Gaurav Puraskar by the Governor of Gujarat under the Morarji Desai International Peace Education Award. According to the Brahma Kumaris organisation, Nirwair was also presented with a Bharat Gaurav Lifetime Achievement Award at the House of Commons in London in 2016.

== Death ==
Nirwair had been unwell for some time before his death. He was admitted to the Apollo Hospital in Ahmedabad six days before his death after developing a lung infection. He died on Thursday, 19 September 2024, at the age of 85.

His body was taken from Ahmedabad to the Brahma Kumaris' Shantivan headquarters at Abu Road in Rajasthan on 20 September 2024, where it was kept in the conference hall for members of the public to pay their respects. The then 101-year-old head of the Brahma Kumaris, Dadi Ratan Mohini, was among the first to visit the conference hall, and that prayer meetings were organised at hundreds of Brahma Kumaris centres in India and abroad. His last rites were performed at the Mukti Dham crematorium near Abu Road on Sunday, 22 September 2024.

== See also ==
- Brahma Kumaris
- Dadi Ratan Mohini
- Dadi Janki
- BK Brij Mohan
- BK Ramesh Shah
- Mount Abu
- Annexation of Goa
