= Om Shanti Retreat Centre =

Brahma Kumaris meditation centre in Gurugram, India

- ओम शांति रिट्रीट सेंटर
- Abbreviation: ORC
- Formation: 2001; 25 years ago
- Founder: Brahma Kumaris
- Founded at: Bhora Kalan, Manesar, India
- Type: Meditation and training centre
- Legal status: Retreat centre of the Brahma Kumaris
- Purpose: Spiritual education, Raja Yoga meditation training, value-based living programmes
- Headquarters: Bilaspur Chowk, NH-48, Bhora Kalan, Manesar, Gurugram district, Haryana 122413, India
- Coordinates: 28.295453°N 76.848855°E
- Region served: Northern India
- Director: BK Asha
- Parent organization: Brahma Kumaris World Spiritual University
- Affiliations: Brahma Kumaris
- Website: omshantiretreat.org

The Om Shanti Retreat Centre (ORC), also known as OSRC, is a meditation and training centre operated by the Brahma Kumaris at Bhora Kalan, on Pataudi Road in Manesar, Gurugram district, Haryana, India. Established in 2001, it was inaugurated on 19 April 2003 by President A. P. J. Abdul Kalam, who delivered an address titled "Evolution of a Good Human Being" at the campus. The centre serves as the principal training facility of the Brahma Kumaris in northern India and reports recognition by the Union Ministry of Human Resource Development as a Regional Resource Centre for Education in Human Values.

The 28 acres (11 ha) campus, which the Brahma Kumaris say houses about 200 residents, has facilities for residential retreats and conferences, including seven 150-seat seminar halls, a 400-seat auditorium and a 2,300-seat auditorium, a Spiritual Art Gallery, accommodation for some 500 guests, 10 dining halls and a multi-disciplinary health centre.

Programmes at the centre include retreats in Raja Yoga meditation, courses in stress management and value-based living, and conferences for professionals from medicine, business, the public sector and the police.

== History ==
The Brahma Kumaris developed a retreat campus at Bhora Kalan, near Manesar in Gurgaon (now Gurugram), at the start of the 21st century; the centre observes its annual day each year as the anniversary of its founding in 2001. Activities at the campus pre-date the formal inauguration: in late September 2002, The Tribune reported on a three-day all-India seminar on "mind, body, medicine and meditation" attended by some 250 doctors at the still-developing centre, organised by the medical wing of the Brahma Kumaris' Rajyoga Education and Research Foundation.

The centre was formally inaugurated on 19 April 2003 by President A. P. J. Abdul Kalam, who delivered an inaugural address at a convention on the "Evolution of a Good Human Being" hosted at the centre. In his address, Kalam linked spiritual practice with education, value systems and poverty eradication, and described the campus as a "divine environment". The same year, according to a 2023 industry case study, the Brahma Kumaris commissioned a concentrated solar thermal plant at the centre — among its earliest investments in renewable energy at the site.

The centre celebrated its 20th annual day on 16 December 2021. The function was attended by D. R. Karthikeyan (a former director of the CBI and director-general of the National Human Rights Commission), Fatoumata Balde (the Guinean ambassador to India), and Satya Prakash, the BJP MLA for Pataudi.

On 7 December 2025 Vice-President C. P. Radhakrishnan launched the centre's Silver Jubilee Year — its 24th annual day and the start of celebrations marking 25 years of operation — under the theme Rajat-Rashmiyan ("silver rays"). In his address Radhakrishnan described the Brahma Kumaris as "the world's largest women-led spiritual organisation" and said the centre's work was aligned with the Government of India's Mission LiFE initiative on sustainable lifestyles. The event was attended by Haryana's Minister for Environment, Forest, Industry and Commerce, Rao Narbir Singh, among other guests.

== Campus and architecture ==
The centre stands at Bilaspur Chowk on Pataudi Road in Bhora Kalan, on the Delhi–Jaipur national highway (NH-48) corridor in Manesar, about 30 km (19 mi) north of Rewari and roughly 70 km (43 mi) from New Delhi; the postal code of the campus is 122413. According to the Brahma Kumaris and an industry case study, the campus extends to about 28 acres (11 ha) and houses around 200 permanent residents; it is operated as a unit of the Brahma Kumaris World Spiritual University, headquartered at Mount Abu, Rajasthan.

=== Halls and auditoria ===
The Brahma Kumaris describe the centre's training infrastructure as comprising seven 150-seat seminar and training halls, a 400-seat auditorium, a larger 2,300-seat auditorium, separate meditation rooms and a library.

=== Spiritual Art Gallery ===
A "Spiritual Art Gallery" on the campus contains life-size models and paintings depicting Indian cultural and spiritual themes, intended to illustrate the Brahma Kumaris' teachings on the soul, karma and meditation.

=== Accommodation and dining ===
The campus offers residential accommodation for about 500 guests and trainees, with attached laundry services. Vegetarian food, prepared by the centre's residents, is served from 10 dining halls with a combined seating capacity of about 1,500.

=== Health centre ===
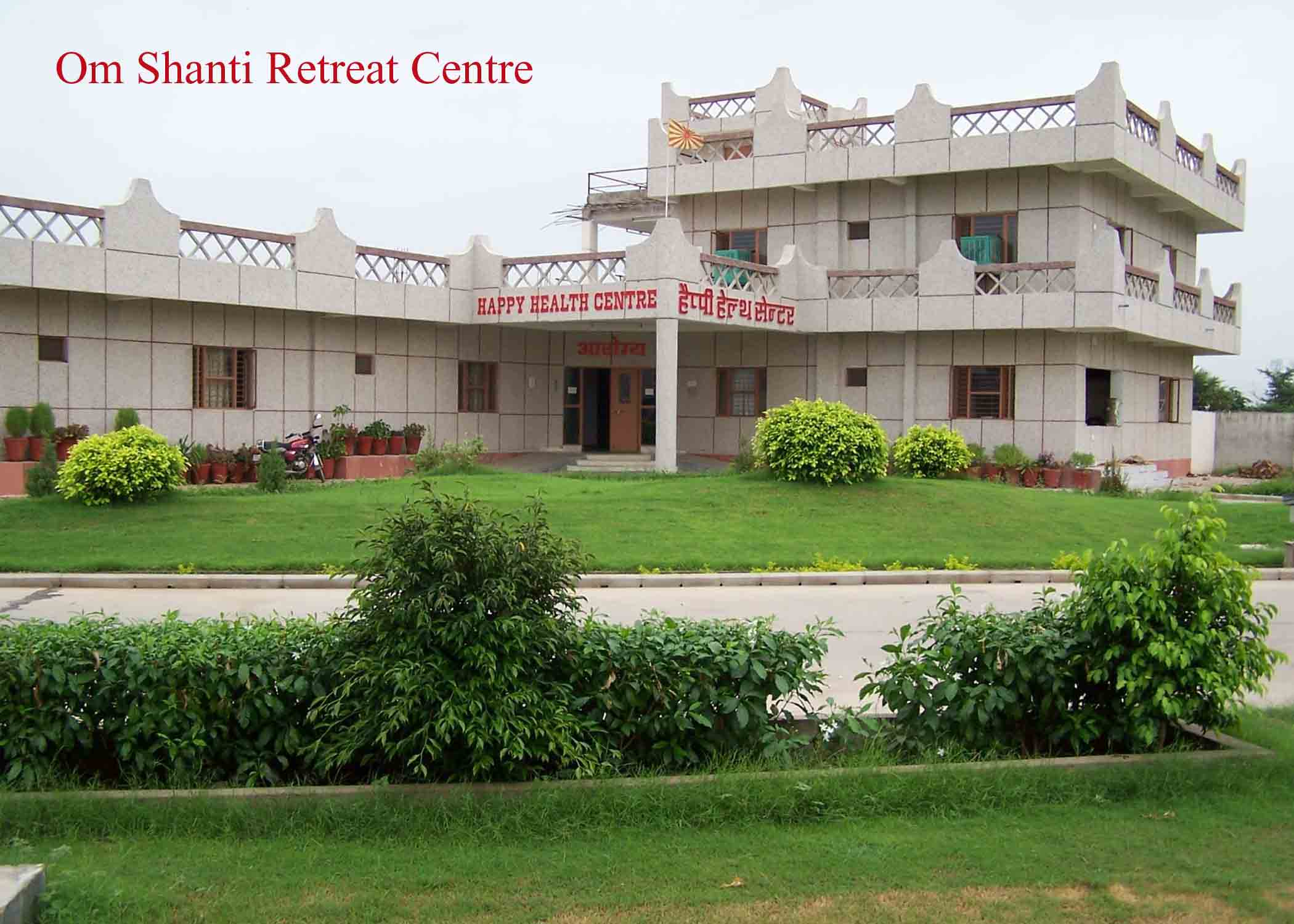
The health centre at the Om Shanti Retreat Centre, photographed in 2010.

A multi-disciplinary health centre at the campus runs an allopathic clinic and a homoeopathic clinic, alongside dental, physiotherapy and acupressure services for residents and visitors.

=== Swara Manjari audio studio ===
On 30 March 2026, the centre opened the Swara Manjari audio studio for the production of devotional and spiritual music. The studio was inaugurated by the violinist Sangeeta Shankar, with senior Brahma Kumaris speakers including the centre's director, BK Asha, and BK Chakradhari, the director of the Shakti Nagar service centre in Delhi.

== Renewable energy and sustainability ==
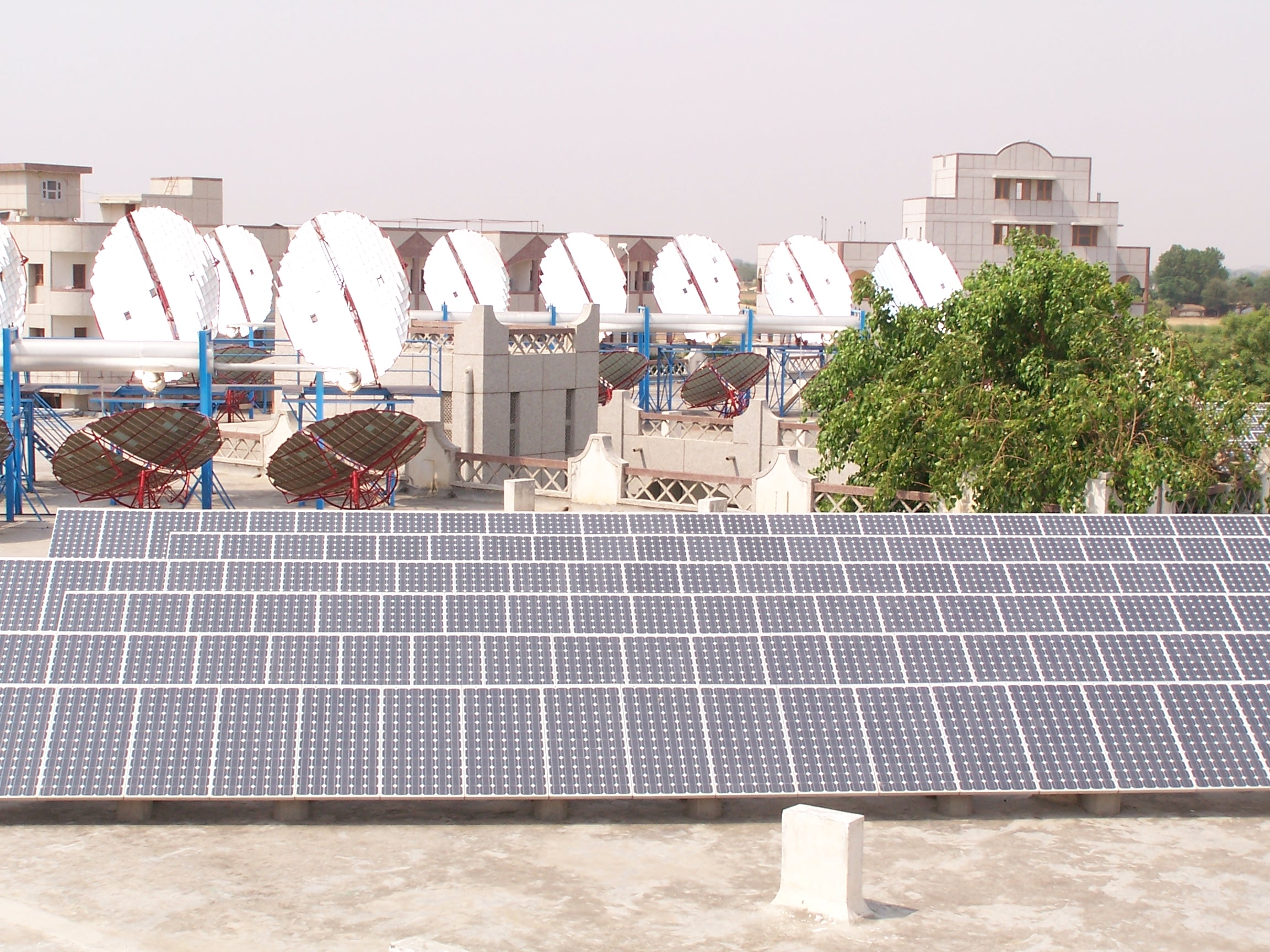
A solar photovoltaic array at the Om Shanti Retreat Centre, photographed in 2010.

The centre has been a long-standing site of renewable energy investment by the Brahma Kumaris, who report that solar power has supplied most of the campus's electricity and cooking requirements.

=== Solar power and energy storage ===
According to a 2023 case study by the energy-research firm JMK Research & Analytics, the centre's first solar photovoltaic (PV) installation was a 200 kW array commissioned in 2006, paired with an 800 kWh lead-acid battery energy storage system (BESS) that reached the end of its working life in 2011. Subsequent solar PV projects of 250 kW (2013), 200 kW (2019) and a further 200 kW (2021) brought the cumulative installed solar PV capacity at the centre to about 850 kW. A concentrated solar thermal plant was also commissioned at the centre in 2003.

In 2021 the centre commissioned a hybrid energy-storage system in conjunction with the 200 kW solar array installed that year. The system, designed and built by the Mumbai-based engineering firm Vision Mechatronics, pairs about 614 kWh of lithium-ion batteries with about 480 kWh of tubular-gel lead-acid batteries — a combination its designers describe as the first lithium-lead hybrid storage installation of its scale in India — for a combined storage capacity of approximately 1 MWh. The case study reports that the hybrid system replaced the centre's diesel-generator backup and increased the share of renewable energy in the centre's annual electricity consumption to about 99 per cent.

In December 2025 The Tribune, reporting on the Silver Jubilee launch, described the campus as operating "a 1 MW hybrid solar power plant" — a reference to the 2021 hybrid storage system.

=== Other environmental initiatives ===
According to The Tribune, the centre also operates rainwater harvesting systems, biogas and sewage-treatment plants, and "green kitchens", and runs a free sapling nursery and a tree-plantation programme called Kalp Taru. Vice-President C. P. Radhakrishnan, addressing the Silver Jubilee launch, described the centre's environmental work as aligned with the Government of India's Mission LiFE initiative.

== Programmes ==
The centre runs residential retreats in Raja Yoga meditation and courses in self-management and stress reduction. The Brahma Kumaris describe its target audiences as including educators, administrators, business and industrial professionals, scientists and engineers, jurists, women and youth, and report that government, public-sector, semi-government and corporate organisations have sent participants to its programmes.

=== Notable programmes and events ===
- In June 2022, the centre held a programme for physicians titled "My First Responsibility – Self Care", addressed by B. N. Gangadhar, then chairperson of the Medical Assessment and Rating Board of the National Medical Commission.
- In March 2026, the centre hosted a three-day national conference for traders and entrepreneurs, inaugurated by Satish Mahana, Speaker of the Uttar Pradesh Legislative Assembly.

== Notable visits ==
In June 2022, the Governor of Kerala, Arif Mohammad Khan, visited the centre to address a programme on "compassion and mercy". The Silver Jubilee launch on 7 December 2025 was attended by Vice-President C. P. Radhakrishnan and by Haryana's Minister for Environment, Forest, Industry and Commerce, Rao Narbir Singh, among other guests.

== Leadership ==
The centre is directed by BK Asha, a senior member of the Brahma Kumaris. She joined Brahma Kumaris in 1972 — after resigning from a lectureship at Mount Carmel College in Bangalore. She is a member of its Management Committee at the Mount Abu headquarters and the Delhi chairperson of the Administrators' Wing of its Rajyoga Education and Research Foundation (RERF). In that representational capacity, BK Asha has led successive Brahma Kumaris delegations that called on the Presidents of India at Rashtrapati Bhavan.

== Visitor information ==
The centre's address is Bilaspur Chowk, NH-48, Bhora Kalan, Manesar, Gurugram district, Haryana 122413, India. The Brahma Kumaris say transport from nearby railway stations and from Delhi airport can be arranged on request.

== See also ==
- Brahma Kumaris
- Mount Abu
- Raja Yoga
- Lekhraj Kripalani
- List of solar power stations in India
