= Saifee Hospital =

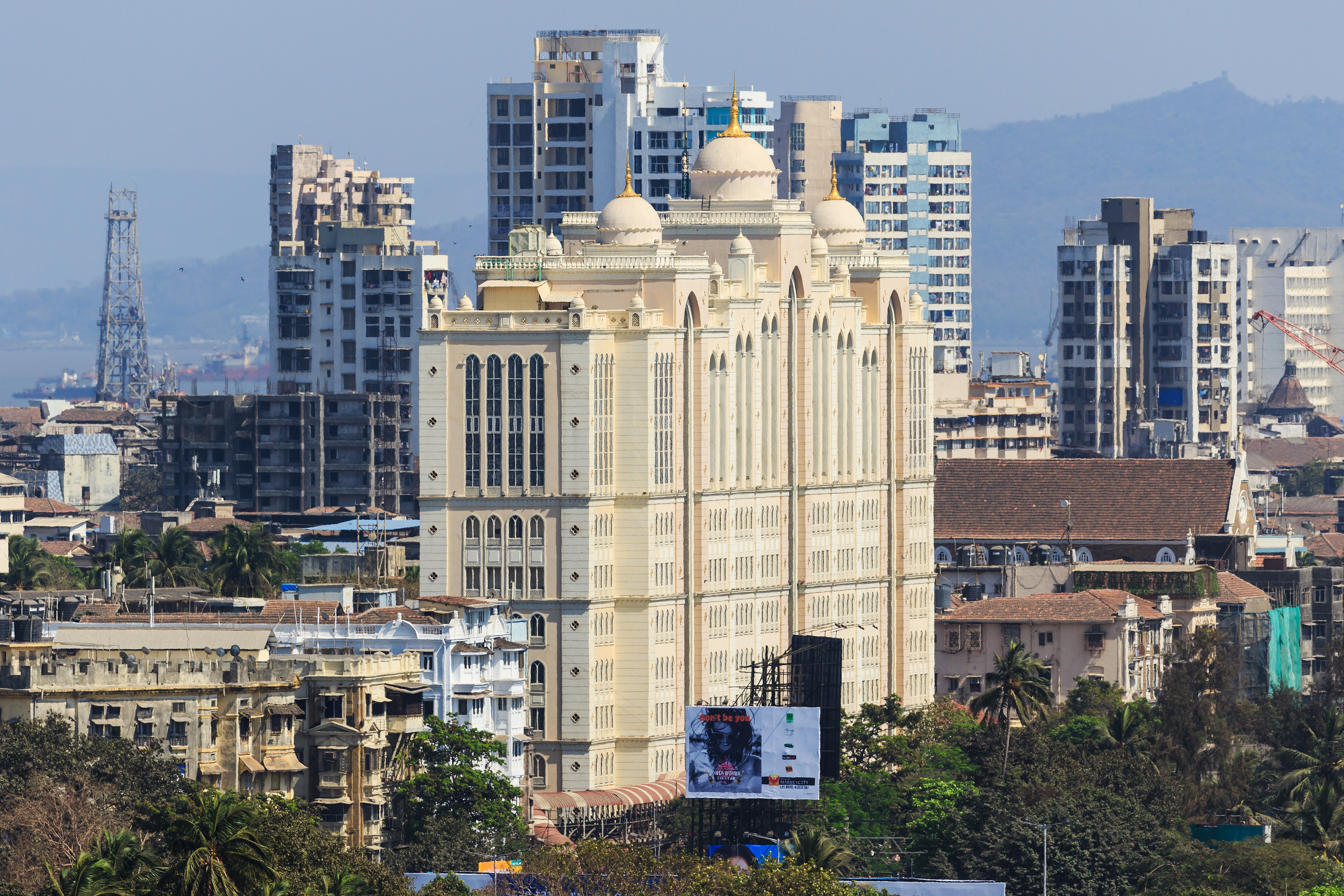

Geography
- Location: 15/17, Maharshi Karve Marg, Charni Road, Mumbai, Maharashtra, India
- Coordinates: 18.952493°N 72.818177°E

Organisation
- Type: General
- Religious affiliation: Dawoodi Bohra

Services
- Emergency department: Yes
- Beds: 257

History
- Opened: 1948

Links
- Website: www.saifeehospital.com
- Lists: Hospitals in India

Saifee Hospital is a multi-speciality hospital located at Charni Road, Mumbai, India. Saifee Hospital is founded by the head of the Dawoodi Bohra faith, Syedna Mohammad Burhanuddin, dedicated the hospital to the memory of his revered father, Syedna Taher Saifuddin.

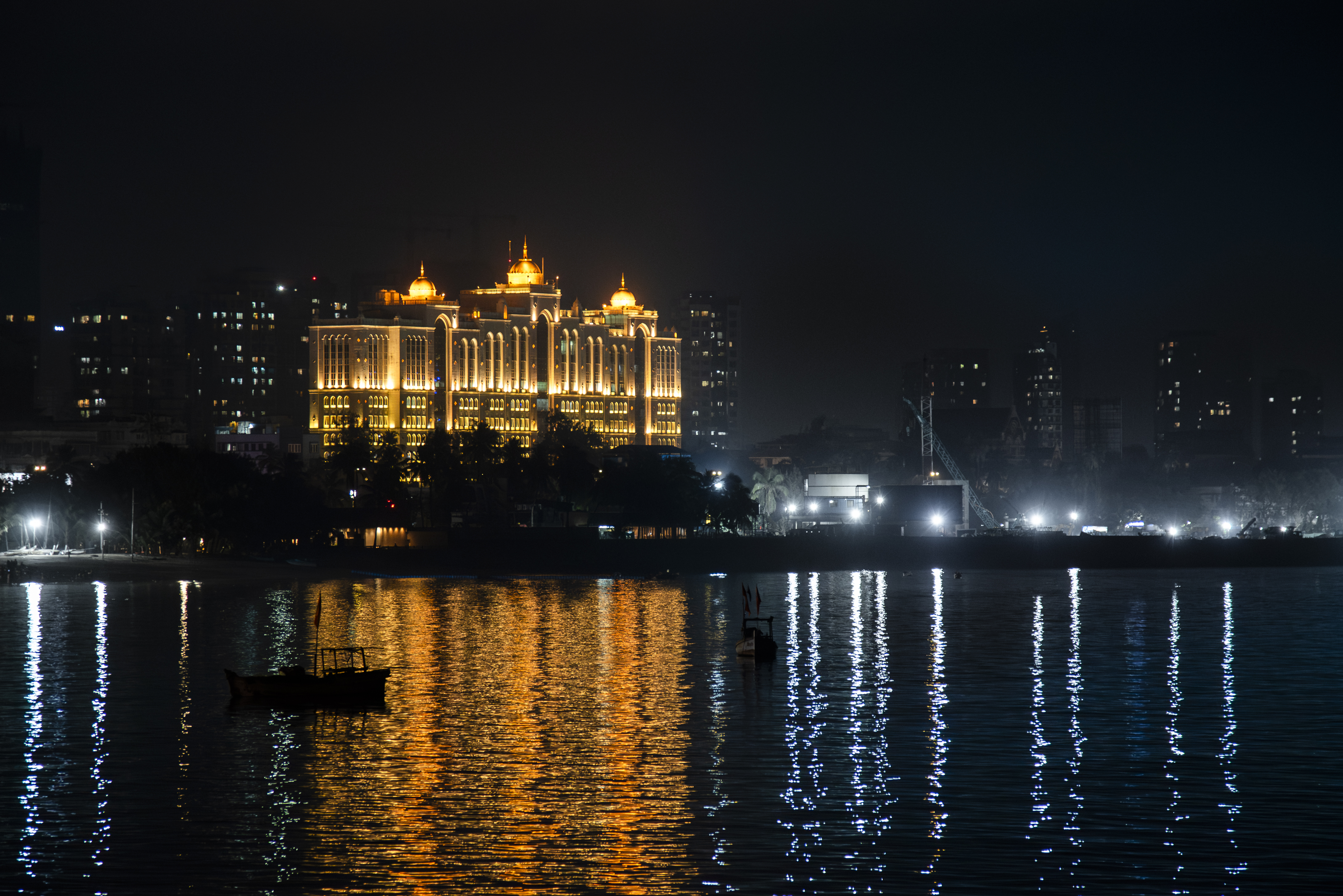
Saifee Hospital, Mumbai

== History ==
Saifee Hospital was established by the Dawoodi Bohras in 1948 with the aim of providing safe, ethical and affordable medical assistance to people of all faiths and socio-economic backgrounds. In 2000, the foundation of a new hospital on the existing premises was laid down by Dr Syedna Mohammed Burhanuddin. Construction commenced in 2001 and the new hospital was commissioned on 4 June 2005 in the presence of the Prime Minister of India, Dr. Manmohan Singh. The architecture of the hospital features a combination of classical Arabian (with domes and arches) and contemporary (with glass curtain facades) styles.

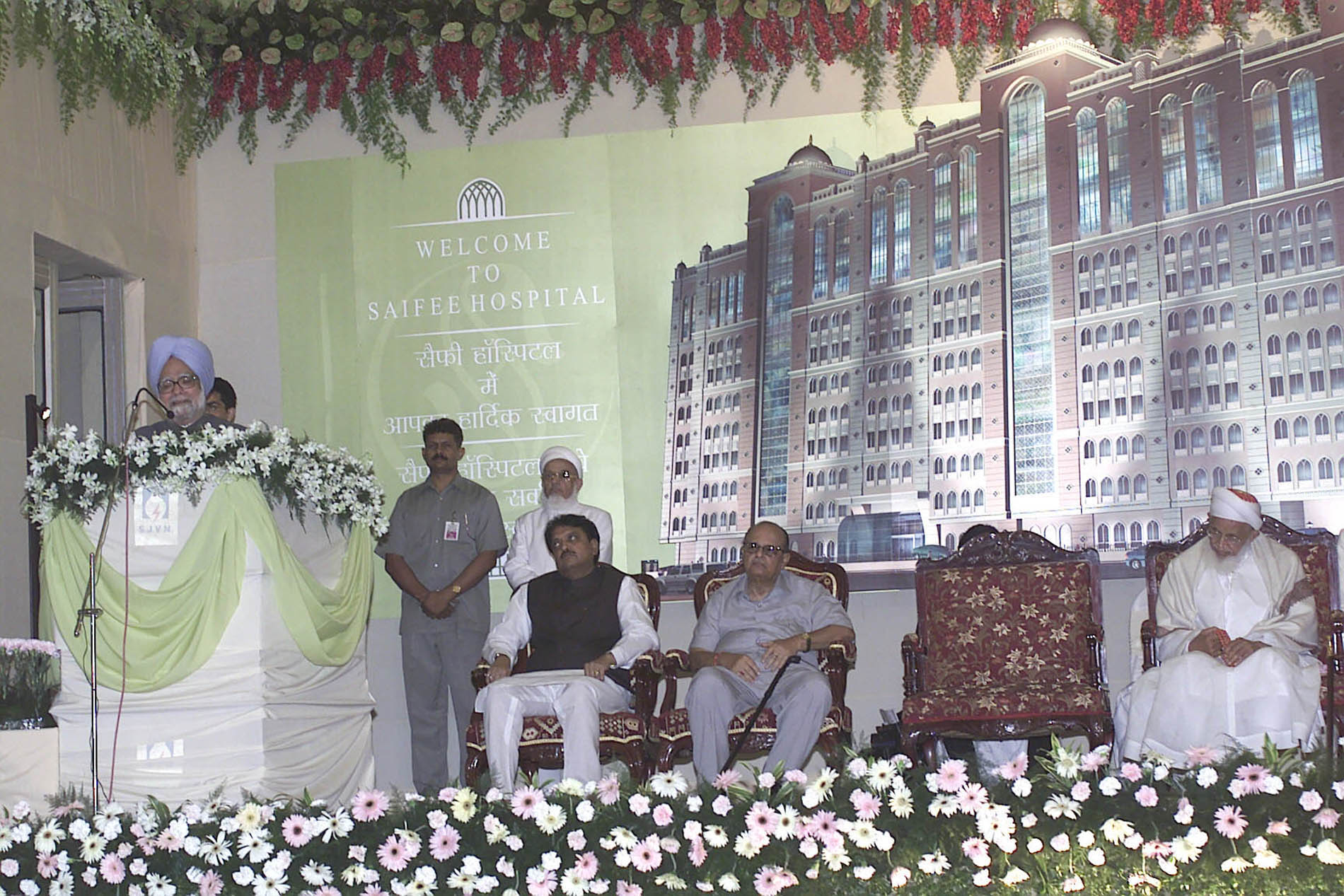
Manmohan Singh, then Prime Minister of India, speaks at the inauguration of Saifee Hospital on June 4, 2005. Seated are: Vilasrao Deshmukh, Mohammed Fazal, and Mohammed Burhanuddin.

== Services ==
The hospital has approximately 257 beds, as well as 44 ICU beds, and 9 operating theaters, and conducts over 10,000 surgeries a year.

Saifee Hospital specializes in bariatric surgeries, cardiology, critical care medicine, dentistry, dermatology, gynecology, hepatology, oncology, neurology, nephrology, ophthalmology, neonatology, high dose radioactive therapy units, and Pressurized Intra Peritoneal Aerosol Chemotherapy (PIPAC).

In the aftermath of the 2011 Mumbai bombings, Saifee Hospital provided free treatment to victims and others affected by the bomb blast.

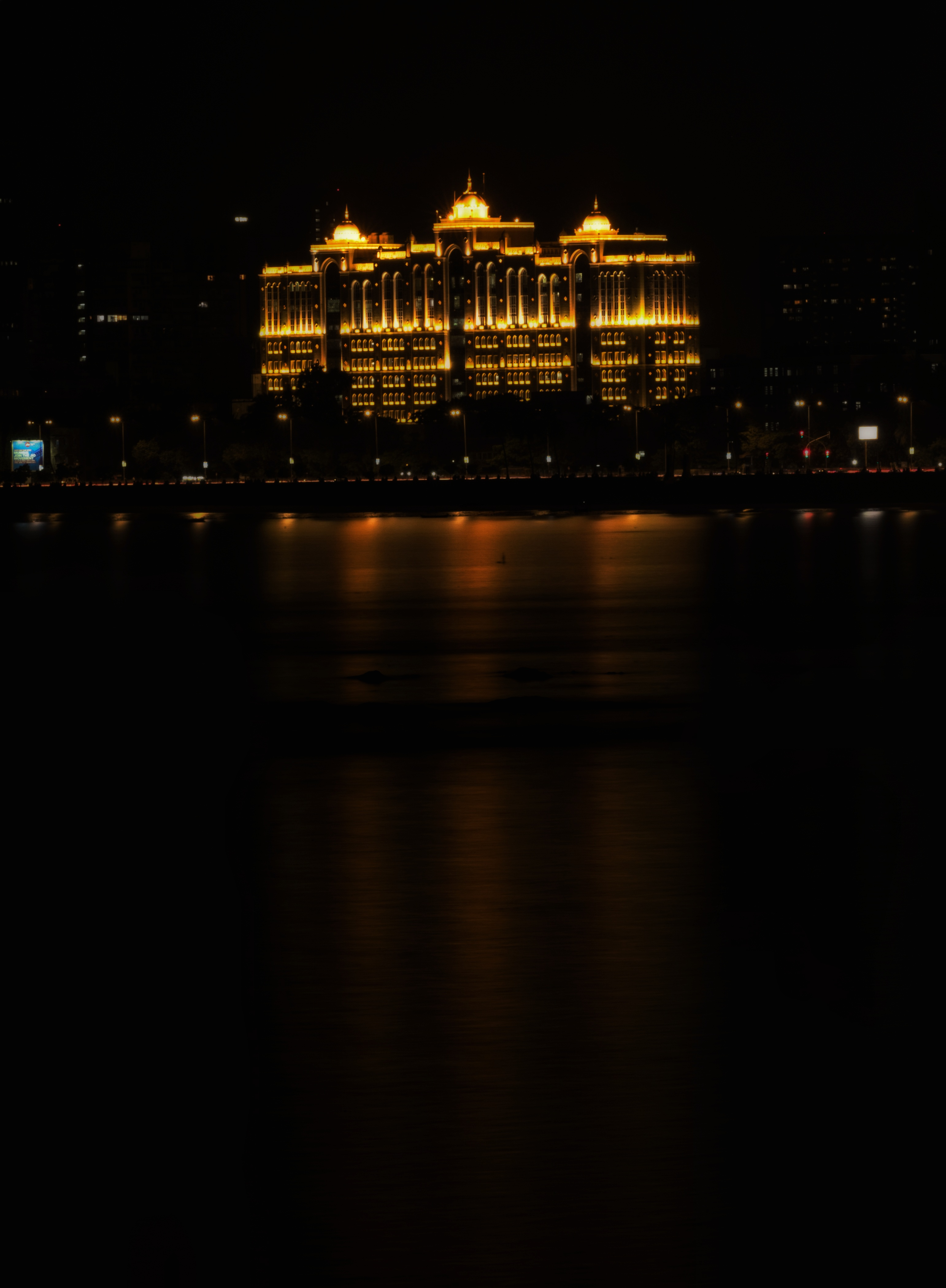
Saifee Hospital at night.
