= World Congress of Faiths =

International meeting about world religions

The World Congress of Faiths was founded in 1936 by Francis Younghusband for promoting interfaith dialogue.

The first event took place in London from 3–17 July 1936. It was created after Parliament of the World's Religions and the event was attended by Russell Barry, Halide Edib Adıvar, and Sarvepalli Radhakrishnan, among others.
