= Raja Yoga Meditation (Brahma Kumaris) =

Meditation technique taught by the Brahma Kumaris

Raja Yoga Meditation (also Raja Yoga, Rajyoga or Rajayoga; also Easy Raja Yoga or Sahaj Raj Yoga; Hindi: राजयोग, सहज राजयोग) is the meditation technique taught by the Brahma Kumaris, an Indian-origin spiritual movement founded in 1936 in Hyderabad, Sindh, by Lekhraj Kripalani (Brahma Baba). Practised with the eyes open, it centres on a doctrine of identifying the self as a non-physical, eternal soul (atma) and on silent inner remembrance of an incorporeal Supreme Soul (Paramatma).

The technique is taught free of charge through Brahma Kumaris centres in more than 110 countries, traditionally as a structured introductory course followed by daily group meditation and study sessions; committed practitioners are taught to extend the practice through ordinary activities rather than confining it to formal sittings.

== Origin and name ==
The meditation method took shape in the late 1930s and 1940s within the early Brahma Kumaris community, then known as Om Mandali, founded by Lekhraj Kripalani in 1935. The community moved to Karachi in 1938 and to Mount Abu in 1950, and from 1952 introduced a structured public introduction course in the technique that has since been the standard route by which newcomers encounter the practice.

The movement's adoption of the name Raja Yoga followed a wider modern Indian usage. Inside the Brahma Kumaris, internal usages such as Easy Raja Yoga have been used to mark the practice as accessible to householders without renunciation of family or work.

== Terminology ==
=== Rajyogi and Rajyogini ===
In the context of the Brahma Kumaris, practitioners who dedicate their lives to the study and practice of this meditation technique are referred to as a Rajyogi (male) or Rajyogini (female).

While the term can apply to any committed student of the movement, "Rajyogini" is frequently used as an honorific title for senior female spiritual leaders—often affectionately addressed as Dadis (elder sisters). The title denotes a practitioner's advanced spiritual state, lifelong dedication, and mastery of the meditation technique. A Rajyogi or Rajyogini is expected to adhere to the spiritual disciplines, which include soul-consciousness, a sattvic vegetarian diet, and brahmacharya (celibacy).

=== BK (Brahma Kumar / Brahma Kumari) ===
The abbreviation BK stands for Brahma Kumar (male) or Brahma Kumari (female), which translates to "Son of Brahma" or "Daughter of Brahma."

In the organization, individuals who are dedicated practitioners, use "BK" as an identifying prefix before their given name. This serves to signify their spiritual affiliation with the Brahma Kumaris who follow the organization's core principles and lifestyle disciplines. It is common to see prominent figures in the movement referred to with this title, such as BK Jayanti or BK Shivani.

== Doctrinal basis ==
The Brahma Kumaris technique cannot be separated from the movement's doctrines about the self, the Supreme Soul and the cycle of time.

=== Soul ===
According to Brahma Kumaris teaching, every human being is an eternal soul (atma; Hindi: आत्मा)—conceived as an infinitesimal point of conscious light situated in the centre of the forehead, between the eyebrows, of the body it temporarily inhabits—rather than identical with that body.

==== Three faculties of the soul ====
The soul is taught to comprise three inseparable faculties:

1. Mind (mana) — the seat of thought, feeling and imagination, in which mental images, impulses and emotions arise.
2. Intellect (buddhi) — the discriminating, judging and decisive faculty, by which the soul evaluates thoughts and chooses how to act.
3. Sanskaras — the accumulated impressions of past thoughts and actions, which shape habit, character and future tendencies.

==== Seven original qualities ====
The soul is also held to possess seven original qualities or powers, understood as innate to its pure, original state, progressively obscured by body-consciousness (identification with the body and its social roles), and progressively recovered through meditation and disciplined living:

1. Peace (shanti) — the soul's natural inner stillness, taught as its baseline state once thought-traffic settles.
2. Love (prem) — pure, unconditional regard for self, others and the Supreme Soul, free from possessiveness or attachment.
3. Happiness (sukh) — contentment that does not depend on external circumstances or sensory pleasure.
4. Purity (pavitrata) — clarity of intention and action, taught as freedom from selfish or conflicting desires.
5. Knowledge (gyan) — true self-knowledge and understanding of the soul, the Supreme Soul and the cycle of time.
6. Bliss (ananda) — the higher, lasting joy that arises from spiritual realisation rather than from external stimulation.
7. Power (shakti) — the spiritual strength to act virtuously, hold attention steady and face circumstances calmly.

The first task of the meditator in the technique is therefore to shift attention from body-identification to soul-identification, a movement students call soul-consciousness.

Souls are taught to take human birth in sequence to experience life and to express their qualities, carrying their sanskaras from one body to the next; unlike several classical Indian rebirth schemes, the human soul is not held by Brahma Kumaris doctrine to transmigrate into non-human species. Death, in this account, is described as the soul's departure from the body and immediate re-entry into another body in the ongoing cycle of births.

=== Supreme Soul ===
The Brahma Kumaris teach that God, addressed as the Supreme Soul (Paramatma; Hindi: परमात्मा) and named Shiva (rendered Shiv or Shiv Baba in Brahma Kumaris usage), is similarly an incorporeal point of conscious light, but unlike human souls is not embodied in the cycle of births and deaths. The Supreme Soul is described as the perfect and unchanging instantiation of the same seven qualities the soul possesses—peace, love, happiness, purity, knowledge, bliss and power—and is referred to in Brahma Kumaris literature as the Ocean of these qualities and the spiritual father of every soul, regardless of social labels of religion, gender, nationality or culture.

According to Brahma Kumaris doctrine the Supreme Soul resides in a transcendent realm of golden-red light variously called the Soul World, Brahmlok or Paramdham ("Supreme Abode"), where all souls are taught to have originally dwelt in their pure, pre-incarnate form before descending into the cycle of births. Within the movement's cyclical cosmology of repeating 5,000-year cycles, the Supreme Soul is held to enter the world only at the end of each cycle—during the so-called Confluence Age—by descending into the body of the founder Lekhraj Kripalani in order to deliver the movement's revealed teachings to humanity.

A distinctive feature of Brahma Kumaris doctrine is the inclusivist identification of this single, incorporeal Supreme Soul with the high-deity figures of the world's major religions: Brahma Kumaris literature presents the Supreme Soul as the same being whom different cultures have called by various names, including Allah, Jehovah and the Hindu God, a claim that scholars have linked to the movement's universalist appeal and international outreach. The doctrinal goal of the meditation is described as a direct, silent communion (yog) in which the meditating soul receives and is re-energised by these qualities through contact with the Supreme Soul.

=== The Raja Yoga Meditation method ===
In the Brahma Kumaris technique, the Sanskrit word yoga is glossed in its older root sense of "linking" or "joining"—specifically, the silent mental linking of the individual soul with the Supreme Soul through inner remembrance. The core of the practice is therefore an inward, devotional contemplation of the qualities of the soul and of the Supreme Soul; it omits the postural and breath-control disciplines (asana, pranayama), and treats neither samadhi nor kaivalya as the operative goal.

A distinctive feature of the technique, frequently noted by ethnographers and neurophysiological researchers alike, is that it is performed with the eyes open rather than closed. Practitioners sit upright and direct their gaze either at an external image—commonly the Brahma Kumaris symbol of a luminous oval representing the Supreme Soul—or at the forehead region of another student, while inwardly addressing the Supreme Soul as a personal source of love, peace and power. The term drishti (literally "vision" or "gaze") names both this open-eyed visual fixation and a corresponding inner attitude of "seeing souls rather than bodies" carried into ordinary social interactions.

== Seven-lesson foundation course ==
The standard introduction for newcomers, in place since 1952, is a structured course of seven lessons that combines doctrinal exposition with guided practice in open-eyed meditation, and that serves as the gateway to fuller participation in centre activities. Frank Whaling's account, the most detailed in the academic literature, presents the lesson sequence as follows.

=== Lesson 1: The soul ===
Lesson 1 introduces the doctrine of the self as a non-physical, eternal soul, located at the centre of the forehead and distinct from the body it inhabits. Students are walked through the soul's three faculties—mind, intellect and sanskaras—and its seven original qualities, and given a guided exercise in the corresponding meditative shift from body-consciousness to soul-consciousness, in which attention is withdrawn from physical and social identifications and held on the soul as a stable point of conscious light.

=== Lesson 2: The Supreme Soul ===
Lesson 2 introduces the doctrine of the incorporeal Supreme Soul, described as the perfect and unchanging instantiation of the same seven qualities the soul possesses and as the spiritual father of every soul. Meditation is presented as a silent yog—a "linking" between the individual soul and the Supreme Soul, in which the meditator turns inward, addresses the Supreme Soul as a personal source of love, peace and power, and draws on its qualities; students are taught to begin and end each sitting with this remembrance.

=== Lesson 3: Cycle of time and the four yugas ===
Lesson 3 sets out the movement's cyclical cosmology of repeating 5,000-year cycles divided into four yugas—the Golden (Satya), Silver (Treta), Copper (Dvapara) and Iron (Kali) Ages—together with a transitional Confluence Age in which the present meditation is taught. The current period is identified with the close of the Iron Age and the Confluence; meditation is framed as a means of inner renewal and re-purification at this transitional juncture, rather than as a generic spiritual exercise detached from cosmic time.

=== Lesson 4: The tree of souls and the doctrine of karma ===
Lesson 4 presents the Brahma Kumaris image of a "world drama tree" or kalpa tree, in which different categories of soul correspond to different branches and historical religious traditions, all rooted in the same Supreme Soul. The lesson develops the technique's distinctive doctrine of karma and rebirth, teaching that pure thought and action in remembrance of the Supreme Soul settle adverse karmic accounts and improve the quality of future births; meditation is taught as the principal instrument for this settlement, complementing ethical conduct in daily life.

=== Lesson 5: Powers and virtues ===
Lesson 5 introduces a structured set of eight powers—the powers to tolerate, accommodate, discriminate, decide, withdraw, face, co-operate and "pack up" (i.e. let go of unfinished issues)—together with seven principal virtues such as humility, tolerance, contentment, sweetness, mercy, honesty and courage. The meditator is taught to draw these qualities down from the Supreme Soul during sustained remembrance and to apply them in family, professional and social relationships, with each meditation session typically focused on one such power or virtue.

=== Lesson 6: Virtues and ethical living ===
Lesson 6 frames the meditation as inseparable from the cultivation of inner virtues and ethical conduct in everyday life. Students are taught to maintain a steady remembrance of the soul's seven qualities through the day, expressing them as practical virtues—honesty in speech, non-violence in thought, word and action, humility, tolerance, contentment, generosity, mercy and self-restraint—rather than as abstract ideals. The Brahma Kumaris present this discipline as Easy Raja Yoga—a path that emphasises inner virtue and ethical living within ordinary household, family and working life, rather than monastic withdrawal.

=== Lesson 7: World service ===
Lesson 7 frames the cumulative purpose of the practice as world service—the cultivation of inner peace and virtue, understood as a contribution to wider social, environmental and educational renewal. The lesson integrates the technique into the movement's outreach work in education, healthcare, prisons, women's empowerment and environmental sustainability, presenting individual meditation, ethical conduct and voluntary service as three mutually reinforcing aspects of the same path.

== Reception ==
Outside the empirical literature, scholarly assessment of the technique is closely bound up with the wider classification of the Brahma Kumaris movement, which has been variously described as a millenarian new religious movement, a novel modern religion in its own right, the organisation itself describes its work as non-religious spiritual education.

Babb's 1986 ethnography drew attention to a feature of the meditation's transmission that is unusual in modern Hindu reform movements: instructional authority is largely held by women, and the central oral teachings (the murli) are voiced through a senior female practitioner in trance. Julia Howell's later survey of gender roles in Brahma Kumaris communities placed the meditation's transmission within a wider organisational pattern in which women exercise teaching authority unusual for their social setting. Walliss's 2002 monograph, which remains the most extensive academic study of the movement, treats the technique as inseparable from the wider Brahma Kumaris discipline of celibacy, dietary restriction and daily centre attendance, and notes that the practice has been accommodated to international and predominantly householder constituencies through programmatic restatements as Easy Raja Yoga and similar branding.

== See also ==
- Brahma Kumaris
- Dadi Prakashmani
- Dadi Janki
- BK Shivani
- BK Jayanti
