= District Grand Lodge of Bombay =

District Grand Lodge of Bombay is a Masonic organization under the jurisdiction of the United Grand Lodge of England (UGLE) based at Freemasons' Hall, Mumbai, located at D N Road, Fort, Mumbai, Maharashtra. It serves as the administrative and governing body for Freemasonry lodges in the western Indian states of Maharashtra, Gujarat, Goa, and parts of Madhya Pradesh.

== History ==
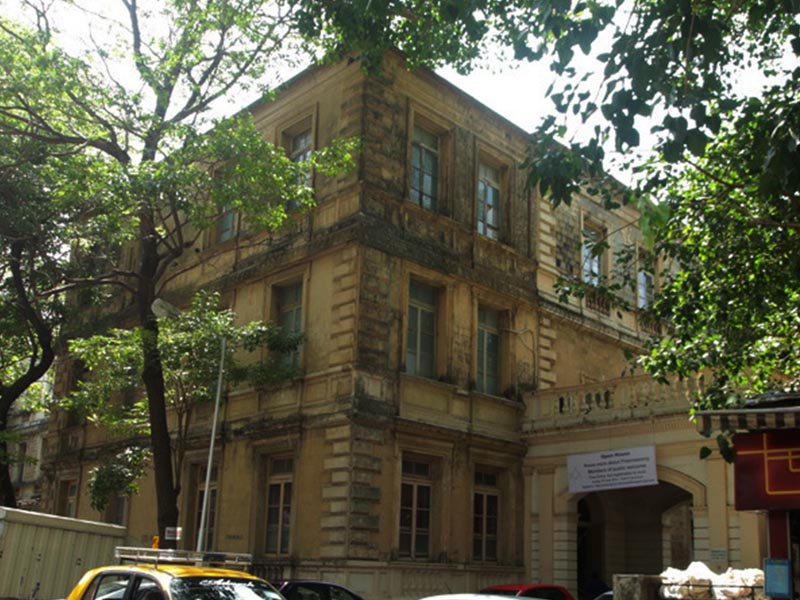
DGL of Bombay in Fort, Mumbai

Freemasonry arrived in Bombay (now Mumbai) in the mid-18th century, with the first lodge consecrated under the authority of the United Grand Lodge of England. This marked the beginning of organized Freemasonry in western India, closely linked to the presence of the British East India Company.

The operations of the freemasons began in Mumbai from the Town Hall (Asiatic Library) until the Freemason District Grand Lodge was built.

== Influence ==
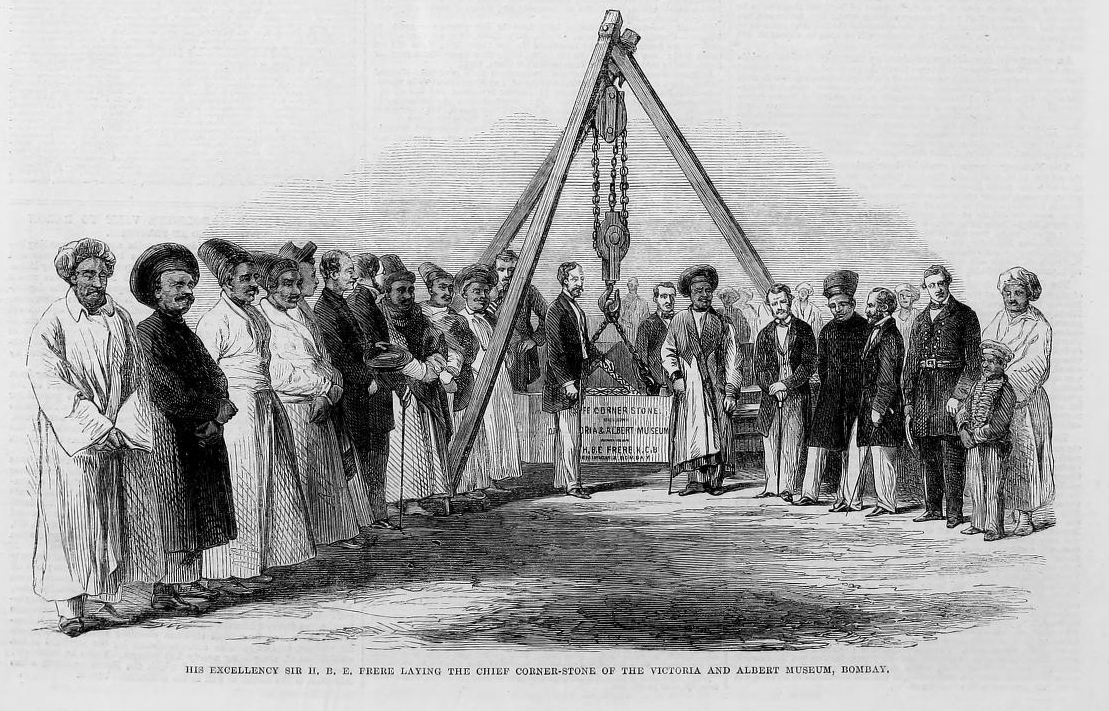
Sir Henry Bartle Frere laying the chief corner-stone of the museum, with Jagannath Shankarseth in 1862

The Willingdon Sports Club was founded in 1918 by Lord Willingdon, a known Freemason. The Royal Bombay Yacht Club (1846), founded by Henry Morland—who served as Grand Master of Scottish Freemasonry in India—and the Bombay Gymkhana (1875) had buildings designed by John Adams, whose architectural work reflected Masonic ideals. Many elite clubs across the city were similarly founded or influenced by Freemasons, leaving a lasting legacy on Mumbai’s colonial social and architectural fabric.

Frederick William Stevens, a Freemason initiated in 1875, was the architect behind many iconic Mumbai structures, including the Chhatrapati Shivaji Maharaj Terminus (CSMT) and the Brihanmumbai Municipal Corporation (BMC) headquarters—both reflecting Masonic principles and architectural symbolism. He also designed the Maharashtra Police headquarters in Colaba, Post-Office Mews at Apollo Bunder, the head offices of the BB&CI Railway at Churchgate, the Oriental Life Assurance Offices at Flora Fountain, and the Mulji Jetha Fountain, all of which contribute to Mumbai’s rich colonial-era heritage.

== See also ==
- United Grand Lodge of England
- District Grand Lodge of Bengal
