= Vikas Dilawari =

Indian conservation architect (born 1964)

- Born: 1964 (age 61–62); Mumbai, India
- Education: L S Raheja School of Architecture; School of Planning and Architecture, New Delhi; University of York
- Occupation: Architect
- Awards: Award of Distinction, Merit and Honourable Mention under UNESCO Asia-Pacific Awards for Cultural Heritage Conservation for J. N. Petit Library (2013), Christ Church, Byculla (2017) and Flora Fountain (2019)
- Projects: Restoration of Mumbai's heritage sites, including Flora Fountain, Wellington Fountain, Dr. Bhau Daji Lad Museum and Rajabai Clock Tower
- Website: www.vikasdilawari.in

Vikas Dilawari (born 1964) is an Indian conservation architect who has restored at-risk monuments and heritage buildings in Mumbai, including the Victoria Terminus, Rajabai Clock Tower, Dr. Bhau Daji Lad Museum, Wellington Fountain and Christ Church, Byculla. 16 restoration projects carried out by his team have been recognised by the UNESCO Asia-Pacific Awards for Cultural Heritage Conservation, including the 2019 work on the Flora Fountain, which was designed by architect Richard Norman Shaw and completed in 1864.

== Biography ==
Dilawari was born in Mumbai and attended Jamnabai Narsee School. He then went to L S Raheja School of Architecture for a degree in architecture, and later got a master's degree from the School of Planning and Architecture, New Delhi. He was awarded a fellowship in conservation studies by the University of York, England.

== Career ==
In 1984, as a student, Dilawari worked part-time with Ved Segan, one of the country's first architectural conservationists, who designed Prithvi Theatre and restored Gaiety Theatre in Shimla. After his fellowship in York ended in 1995, Dilawar returned to India and set up his eponymous practice Vikas Dilawari Associates. One of his first major projects was to restore the Army and Navy Building in Kala Ghoda, which was designed by Frederick William Stevens. In 2000, the firm restored the Rajabai Clock Tower, a World Heritage Site designed by George Gilbert Scott. In recent years, his team has restored Mulji Jetha Fountain, Bomanjee Hormarjee Wadia Clock Tower and the Wellington Fountain, in association with INTACH and the Kala Ghoda Association. Around 16 restoration projects undertaken by their team have been awarded under the UNESCO Asia-Pacific Awards for Cultural Heritage Conservation.

== See also ==
- Abha Narain Lambah
- Bruno Souza (architect)
