= Wellington Fountain =

Historic fountain in Mumbai, India

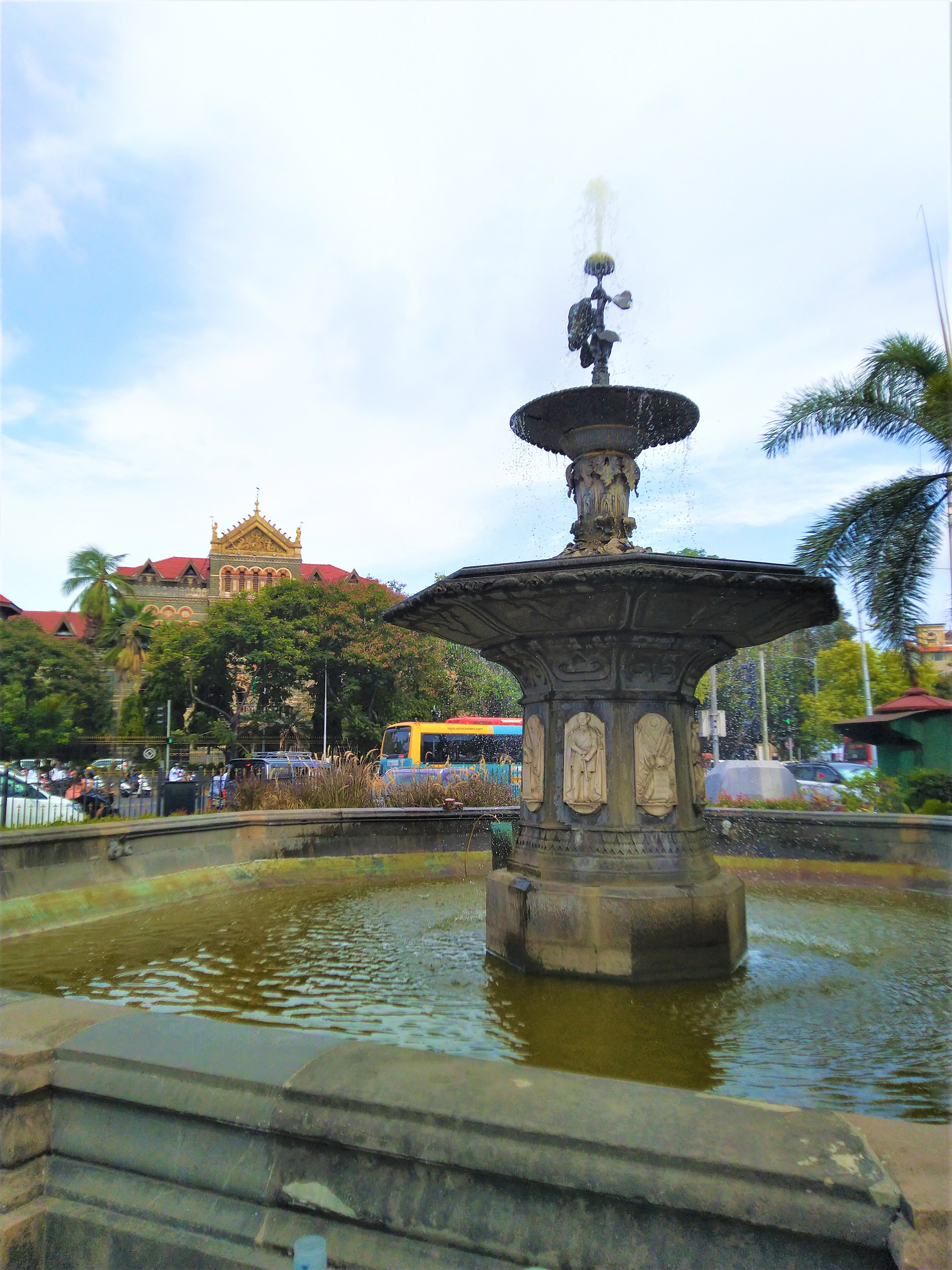
- Wellington fountain, post restoration, in 2023
- Interactive map of Wellington Fountain
- 18.925594°N 72.832531°E
- Type: Fountain
- Location: S P Mukherjee Chowk, Mumbai, Maharashtra, India

History
- Built: 1865; 161 years ago
- Built for: Arthur Wellesley, 1st Duke of Wellington

Site notes
- Architectural style: Neoclassical
- Restored: 2017; 9 years ago
- Restored by: Vikas Dilawari Architects
- Governing body: Brihanmumbai Municipal Corporation (MCGM)
- Owner: MCGM

UNESCO World Heritage Site
- Criteria: Cultural: (ii) (iv)
- Designated: 2018 (43rd session)
- Part of: Victorian Gothic and Art Deco Ensembles of Mumbai
- Reference no.: 1480

Wellington Fountain is a listed historic heritage structure in front of the Maharashtra Police Headquarters at Shyamaprasad Mukherjee Chowk in Fort, Mumbai, which is part of Mumbai's Victorian ensemble that is a UNESCO World Heritage Site. It was erected in 1865 to commemorate the visits of British army officer Arthur Wellesley, 1st Duke of Wellington, who came to India during trips in 1801 and 1804.

The fountain is built in a British Neoclassical style with basalt. It has two tiers and the lower tier has eight bas reliefs depicting the duke's victories. The top tier is made out of metal and features cast iron leaves. There are Latin inscriptions on the fountain that celebrate the achievements of the duke.

== Restoration ==
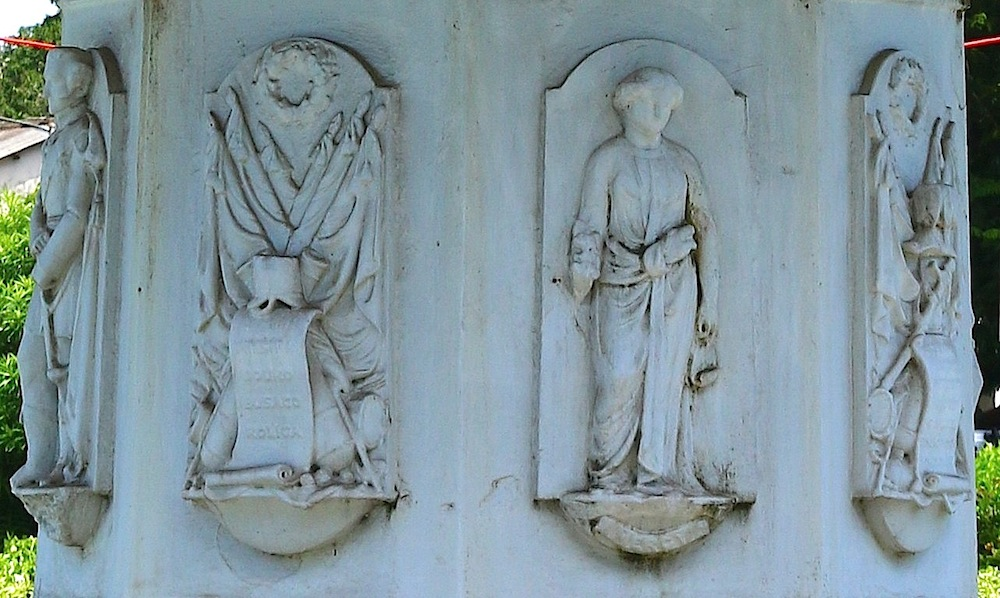
The bas-reliefs on the lower tier depicting the achievements of the duke.

In 2016–17, a team led by the conservation architect Vikas Dilawari restored the fountain, and multiple layers of paint were removed from the basalt structure. However, the water engineering system was intact at the time of restoration. The project was funded by Mahindra and Mahindra Ltd, and was awarded the Honourable Mention under the UNESCO Asia-Pacific Awards for Cultural Heritage Conservation.
