= Maharashtra Police Headquarters =

Heritage building in Maharashtra

Maharashtra Police Headquarters building
- Royal Alfred Sailors' Home
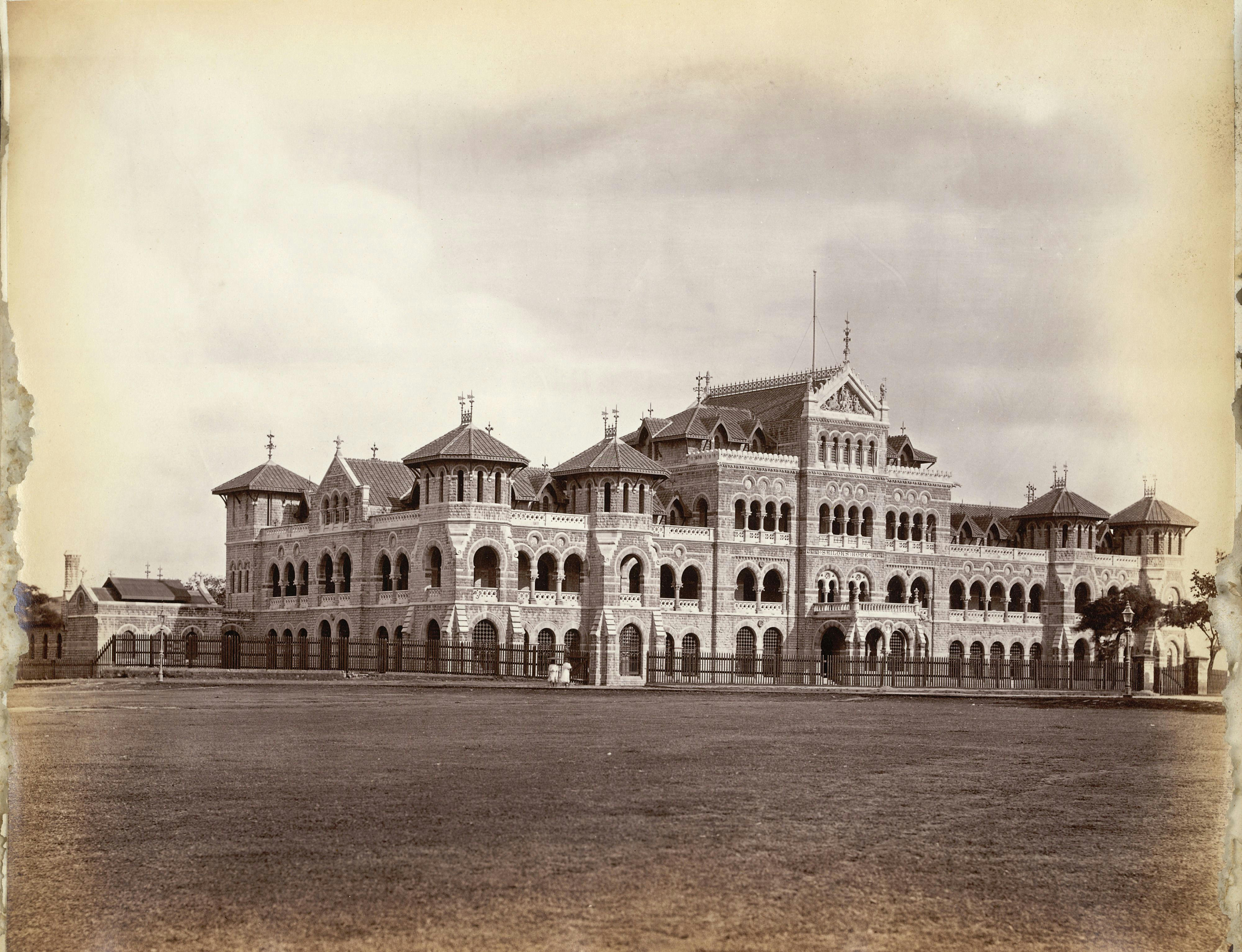
- An 1870s photograph of what was then the Royal Alfred Sailors' Home.

- Location within Mumbai Location within India
- 18°55′31″N 72°50′00″E
- Location: Wellington Circle, Lion Gate

History
- Built: 1876

Site notes
- Area: Fort, Mumbai
- Architectural styles: Gothic Revival, Venetian Gothic

UNESCO World Heritage Site
- Type: Cultural
- Criteria: ii, iv
- Designated: 2018
- Part of: Victorian Gothic and Art Deco Ensembles of Mumbai
- Reference no.: 1480

Maharashtra Police Headquarters building (formerly Royal Alfred Sailors' Home) is a Grade I listed UNESCO World Heritage Site in South Mumbai that was built between 1872 and 1876, and designed by the British architect Frederick William Stevens, who also designed the Chhatrapati Shivaji Maharaj Terminus. The building is often confused with Mumbai Police Headquarters, also built in Gothic Revival style, and several newspapers often carry the image of Maharashtra headquarters while reporting on the latter. The headquarters are located at Wellington Circle in Fort, and face the Wellington Fountain.

Royal Alfred Sailors' Home, the previous occupant of the building, was named after Prince Alfred, the second son of Queen Victoria and Prince Albert, who visited Bombay in 1870. It was a recuperation centre for sick European sailors, and provided accommodation for 20 officers and about 100 seamen. After 1928, it served as the Bombay Presidency Legislative Assembly and then the Maharashtra Vidhan Bhavan until 1982, when the Maharashtra Police moved into the building.

== History ==
The historic structure called Royal Alfred Sailors' Home was built at the height of maritime trade in Bombay, which had become a busy port during the British Raj. It was designed by Frederick William Stevens, an engineer with the Indian Public Works Department, and named after the "sailor prince" Alfred, Duke of Saxe-Coburg and Gotha, the second son of Queen Victoria and Prince Albert who had visited Bombay in 1870. It could accommodate 20 officers and 100 sea men. The Maharaja of Baroda Khanderao II Gaekwad contributed ₹2,00,000 towards the construction of the building.

The building was Stevens's first important commission in the city and he was supervised by James Augustus Fuller. His efforts were described as "an early attempt to infuse Gothic architecture with Muslim nuances". It was acquired by the Government of India in 1928 from the Committee of Royal Alfred Sailors' Home. It then served as the Legislative Assembly and the Bombay Council Hall, until the new council hall was built in 1982. Following the departure, Maharashtra Police moved into the building and currently occupies the site.

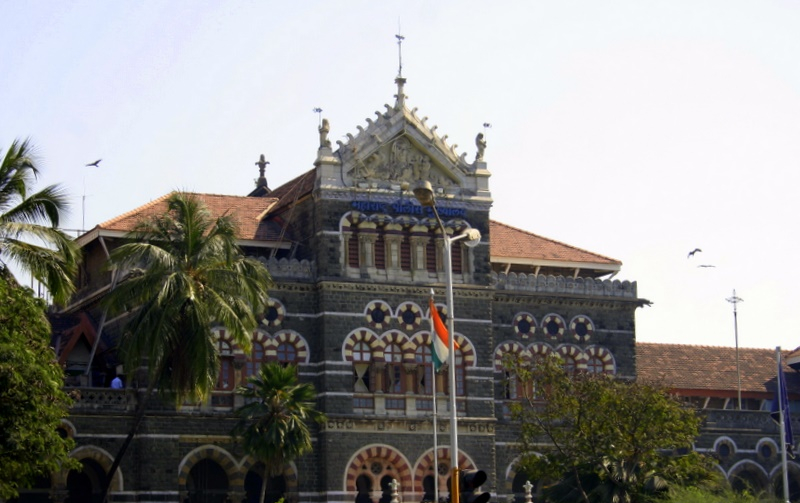
Facade Police Headquarters Mumbai.

== Architecture ==
The building was constructed using blue basalt, specifically the Kurla stone, in contrast to the Mumbai Police Headquarters that used yellow basalt some two decades later in 1896. Red Mangalore tiles were used for the roof. John Lockwood Kipling (father of the novelist Rudyard Kipling), who was then the principal of Sir Jamsetjee Jeejebhoy School of Art, worked on the capitals and cornices. He supervised the students of the college who also worked on the sculptures.

The sculptures were done in Bath stone by the English sculptor Richard Lockwood Boulton of Cheltenham. The pediment has sculptures of the Roman god of water and the sea, Neptune, nymphs, sea horses, and waves that recall the building's proximity to the Arabian Sea. Discussing the charitable institution of the Sailors' Home in an essay in the book Bombay Before Mumbai: Essays in Honour of Jim Masselos, historian Preeti Chopra writes, "Even in the context of port architecture, Bombay's Sailors' Home looked as a "rather luxurious hotel" with large airy rooms and bathrooms."

== Gallery ==
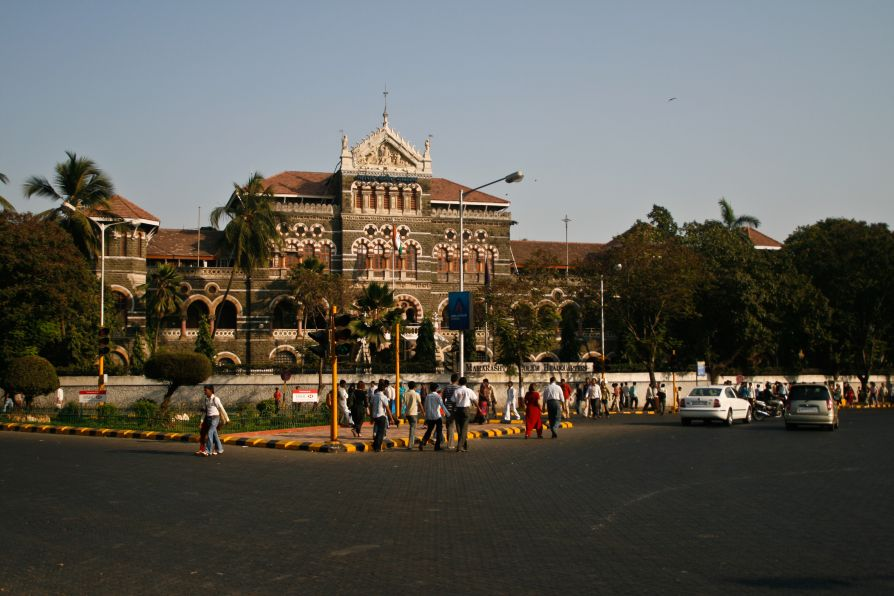
The building was the first important commission for Frederick William Stevens, who later designed the Victoria Terminus.

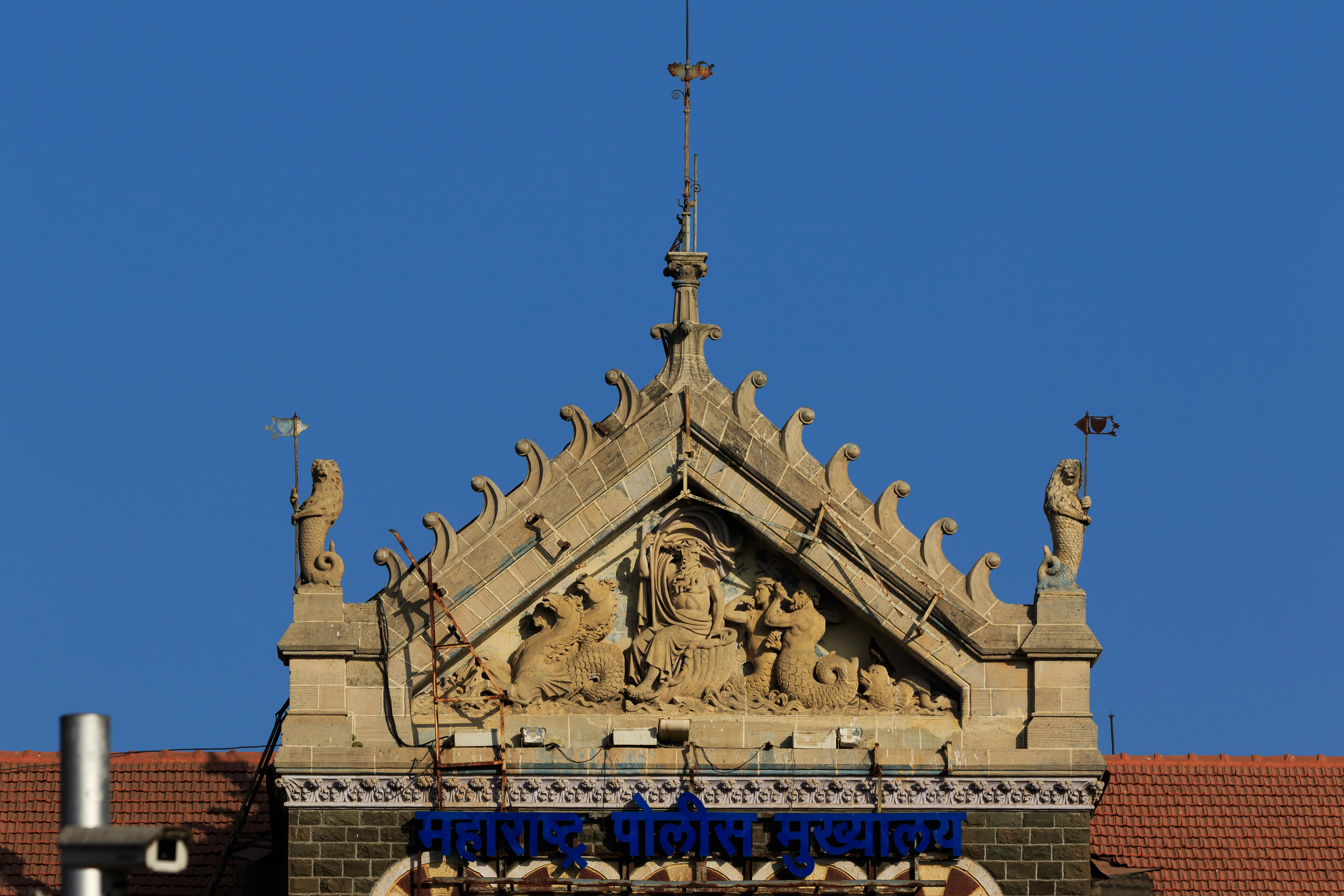
The pediment sculptures depicting Neptune and nymphs were done by Richard Lockwood Boulton.

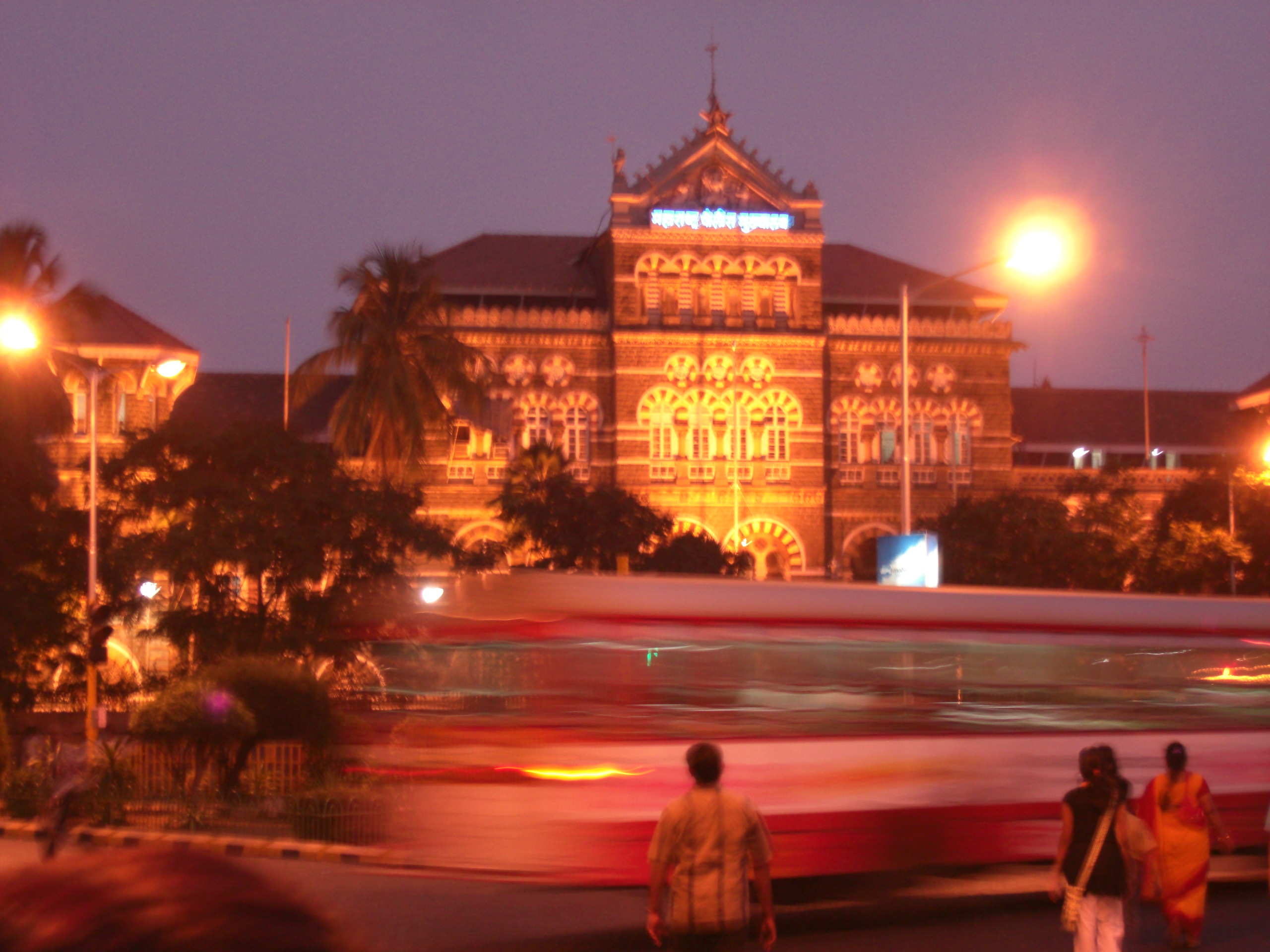
The building at dusk

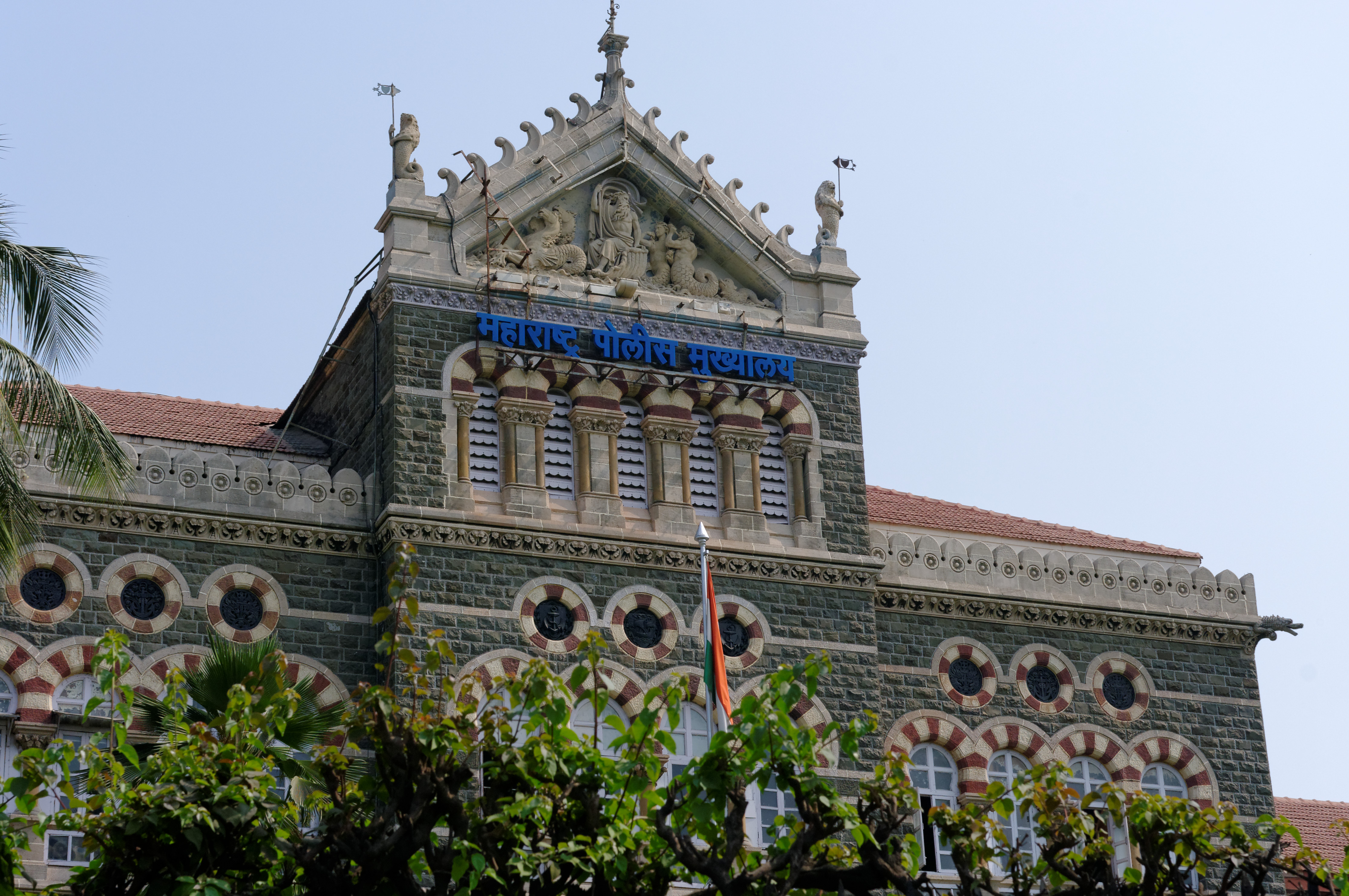
The polychromatic exterior inspired by the Venetian Gothic style

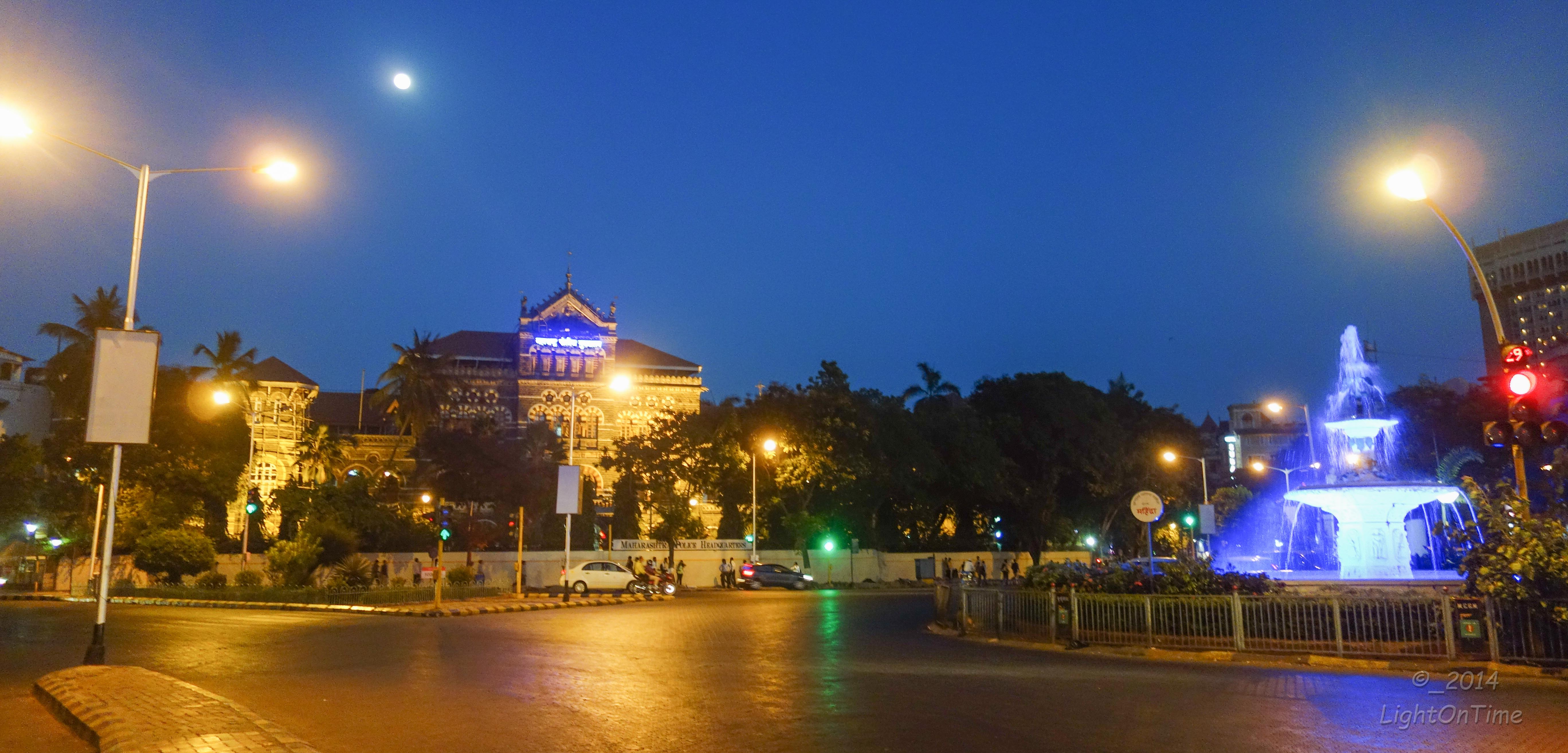
The headquarters at Wellington Circle, with Wellington Fountain in the foreground

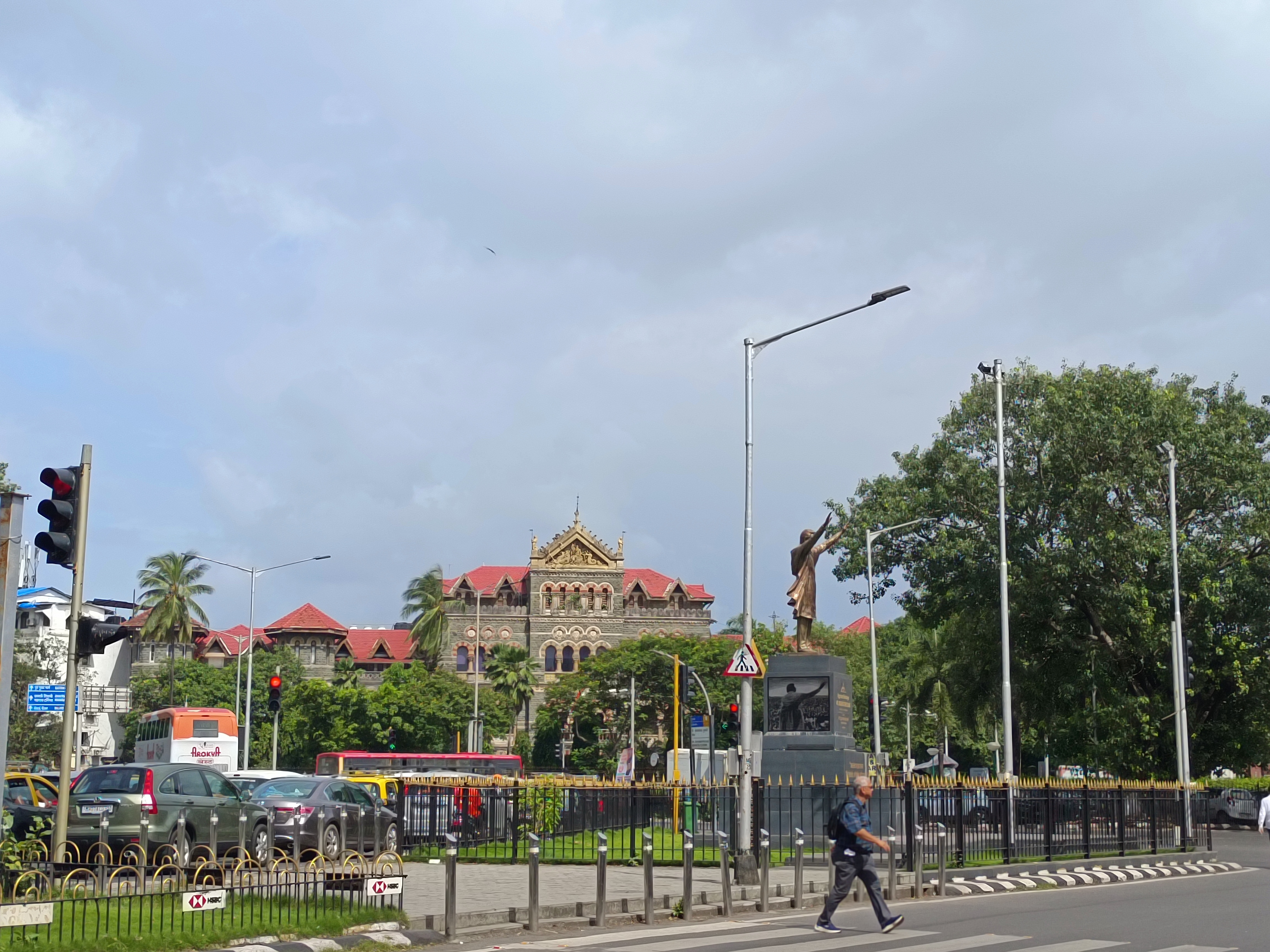
The headquarters at Mumbai
