= List of Masonic Grand Lodges in Asia =

This is a list of all verifiable organizations that claim to be a Masonic Grand Lodge in Asia.

A Masonic "Grand Lodge" (or sometimes "Grand Orient") is the governing body that supervises the individual "Lodges of Freemasons" in a particular geographical area, known as its "jurisdiction" (usually corresponding to a sovereign state or other major geopolitical unit). Some are large, with thousands of members divided into hundreds of subordinate lodges, while others are tiny, with only a few members split between a handful of local lodges. Sometimes there will only be one Grand Lodge in a given area, but the majority of the time there will be at least two. More often, there will be several competing Grand Lodges claiming the same jurisdictional area, or claiming overlapping areas. This fact leads to debates over legitimacy: Not all Grand Lodges and Grand Orients recognize each other as being legitimate. However, such recognition is not relevant to this list, yet recognition is foundational within the fraternal order. Inclusion in this list only requires the establishment of a physical (as opposed to a virtual, or online) presence, and lodges (regular, unrecognized or clandestine) which acknowledge their governance.

Membership numbers are subject to change; for current figures, check the sources which are indicated in the reference section.

Country/Region	State or other geographical area	Name	Founded	Lodges	Members	Notes
China (Republic of)		Grand Lodge of China, F. & A.M.	1949	13	567	
Hong Kong		District Grand Lodge of Hong Kong and the Far East	1846	20		A unit of the United Grand Lodge of England
Hong Kong		Provincial Grand Lodge of the Far East	1899	7		A unit of the Grand Lodge of Ireland
Hong Kong	Japan, Korea, and the Philippines	District Grand Lodge of the Far East		12		A unit of the Grand Lodge of Scotland
India		Provincial Grand Lodge of Ireland In India	1754			A unit of the Grand Lodge of Ireland
India		Grand Lodge of India A.F.& A.M.	1961	360	19,205	
India		District Grand Lodge of India	1842			A unit of Grand Lodge of Scotland
India	Tamil Nadu, Andhra Pradesh, Karnataka and Kerala	District Grand Lodge of Madras	1767	18		A unit of the United Grand Lodge of England
India	Bombay	District Grand Lodge of Bombay				A unit of the United Grand Lodge of England
India	Bengal	District Grand Lodge of Bengal				A unit of the United Grand Lodge of England
India	Northern India	District Grand Lodge of Northern India				A unit of the United Grand Lodge of England
India	Maharashtra	Freemasonry in Mumbai				A unit of the United Grand Lodge of England
Israel		Grand Lodge of the State of Israel A.F. & A.M.	1953	52	2,000	
Israel		The Grand Lodge Jerusalem of Freemasons in Israel.	2013	8		
Israel		Le Droit Humain – Israeli Jurisdiction	1989			DH
Japan		Grand Lodge of Japan	1957	16	1,753	
Kazakhstan		Grand Lodge of Kazakhstan	2016	4	50	Formed with support of Grand Lodge of Russia from their lodges in Kazakhstan
Lebanon		Grand Lodge of F.&A.M of Lebanon	2018			Formed by Lodges working under the District Grand Lodge of Lebanon (GL of F.&A.M of New York) and received official support and charter from the Grand Lodge of New York on October 24, 2018, In 2023, the Conference of Grand Masters of North America declared that the Grand Lodge of Lebanon formed by the Grand Lodge of New York is Irregular as its formation is deemed illegal.
Lebanon		District Grand Lodge of Lebanon	1860	10	250+	Under the Jurisdiction of The Grand Lodge of Antient, Free and Accepted Masons of Scotland
Lebanon		District Grand Lodge of Syria & Lebanon	1912	12	350+	Under the Jurisdiction of the Grand Lodge of Free & Accepted Masons of New York
Lebanon		The Grand Lodge of the District of Columbia – 2 Active Lodges in Lebanon	2010	2	50+	Under the Jurisdiction of the Grand Lodge of Washington, D.C.
Philippines	Rizal Masonic Temple 1316 Cavite St. Tondo, Manila	Gran Logia Soberana del Archipielago Filipino A∴&A∴S∴R∴ (Rito Escoces Antiguo y Acceptado)	1887-1926 (under GOE) 1926-Present (Sovereign)	68	500+	The true lineage of Grande Oriente Español. Website: https://granlogiasoberanaph.com
Philippines	Datu Mantawi Hiram Lodge 100 - Cebu Pitong Lawa Lodge 101 - Batangas Eastern Visayas Masonic Lodge 102 - Samar Lodge Mount Madja-as No. 103 - Iloilo Maharlika Masonic Lodge 104 - Tacloban Ormoc Bay Masonic Lodge 107 - Ormoc Pugad Lawin Masonic Lodge 108 - Quezon City	Grande Loge Mixte Océan Indien PH	GODF - 1773, GLNF, GLUA-UGLE, GLMOI PH - 2023	8	250	https://www.glmoi.org https://assoce.fr/waldec/W9R1005731/GRANDE-LOGE-MIXTE-OC-AN-INDIEN
Philippines		Grand Lodge of Free & Accepted Masons of the Philippines	1912	349	22,896	
Philippines		Independent Grand Lodge of Free & Accepted Masons of the Philippine Islands	2006	14		
Philippines		Gran Logia Nacional de Filipinas / Supremo Consejo 33 para Filipinas	1919 Grande Oriente Español – July 4, 1924 Gran Logia Nacional de Filipinas https://glnf.ph/historia/	12	1000+	International Confederation of the United Grand Lodges / Confederation Internationale Des Grandes Unies www.acaciamagazine.org/html/icucgl website : www.glnf.ph
Singapore, Malaysia and Thailand		District Grand Lodge of the Eastern Archipelago	1858	43		
	A unit of the United Grand Lodge of England					
Singapore, Malaysia and Thailand		Provincial Grand Lodge of South East Asia	2009	8		A unit of Grand Lodge of Ireland
Singapore, Malaysia and Thailand		District Grand Lodge of the Middle East	1916	24		A unit of the Grand Lodge of Scotland

== See also ==
- List of Masonic Grand Lodges
