= James A. Fuller =

British army officer and architect

James Augustus Fuller (1823–1902) was a British Army officer and architect. He rose to the rank of general, and his architectural works include the Bombay High Court built in 1871–8. He supervised Frederick William Stevens, while he was designing his first important commission in Bombay, the Royal Alfred Sailors' Home (now Maharashtra Police Headquarters).
