= Bombay Castle =

Coastal fort in Mumbai, India

- Fort, Mumbai, India
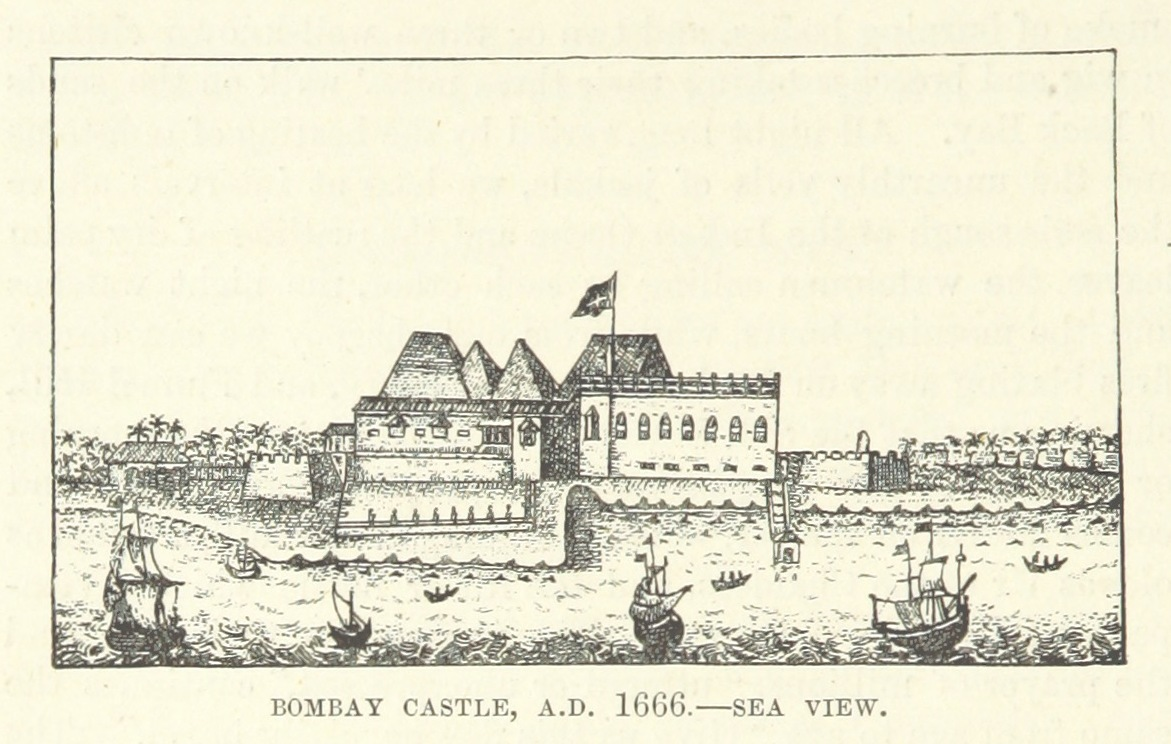
- Bombay Castle, 1666

Site information
- Type: Land battery
- Owner: Portuguese Empire (Before 1668); East India Company (1668–1947); Government of India (1947- Present)
- Open to the public: No
- Condition: Preserved

Location
- Shown within Mumbai
- Location within Mumbai
- Coordinates: 18.931626049277433°N 72.83814296299832°E

Site history
- Materials: Kurla Stone, Red Laterite and Lime mortar

Bombay Castle (also Casa da Orta) is one of the oldest defensive structures built in the city of Mumbai (also known as Bombay). The current castle is a structure built by the British on the site of the Manor House built by a Portuguese nobleman Garcia de Orta. Orta had leased the island of Bombay from the King of Portugal between 1554 and 1570.

The castle was built of local blue Kurla stone and red laterite stone from the Konkan region to the south. The islands came under the hands of the English in 1665, and the East India Company took possession of the castle in 1668. Over the next ten years, they built a defensive structure around the manor.

The castle had four Bastions, three of which were originally surrounded completely with water. These were named the Flag Staff Bastion (where a British Flag had been hoisted), The Flower tree Bastion, and the Tank Bastion. The fourth was the Brab Tree Bastion, known for being near a Brab Tree. This would face the West.

Few records of the original Portuguese castle remain, and historians are trying to piece together the original location of the manor. Two gates of the manor are located within INS Angre, a naval station in South Mumbai. A sundial thought to date back to the Portuguese era is also present. This sundial does not mark out the 12 hours of a day, but rather marks out certain periods that the people of the time deemed important.

The main building within the castle was the Governor's House, in which Gerald Aungier, the second Governor of Bombay used to stay. The Governor's residence was later moved to Parel and then to Malabar Hill (Raj Bhavan at Malabar Hill is where the Governor of Maharashtra stays today) over the next two centuries. The current building houses the offices of the Flag Officer Commanding-in-Chief Western Naval Command.

== Gallery ==
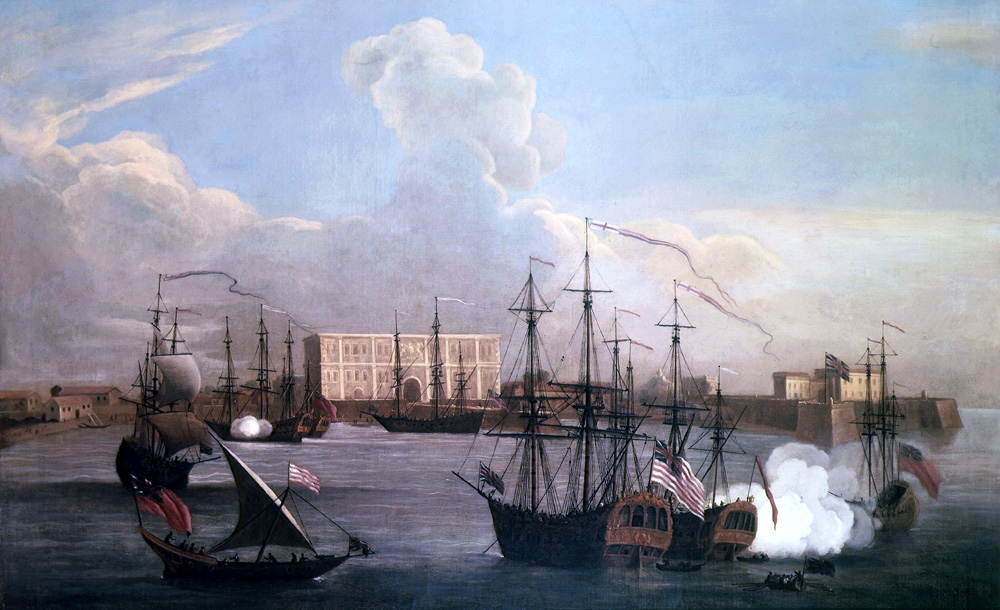
Ships in Bombay Harbour, 1731. The Castle can be seen at the right

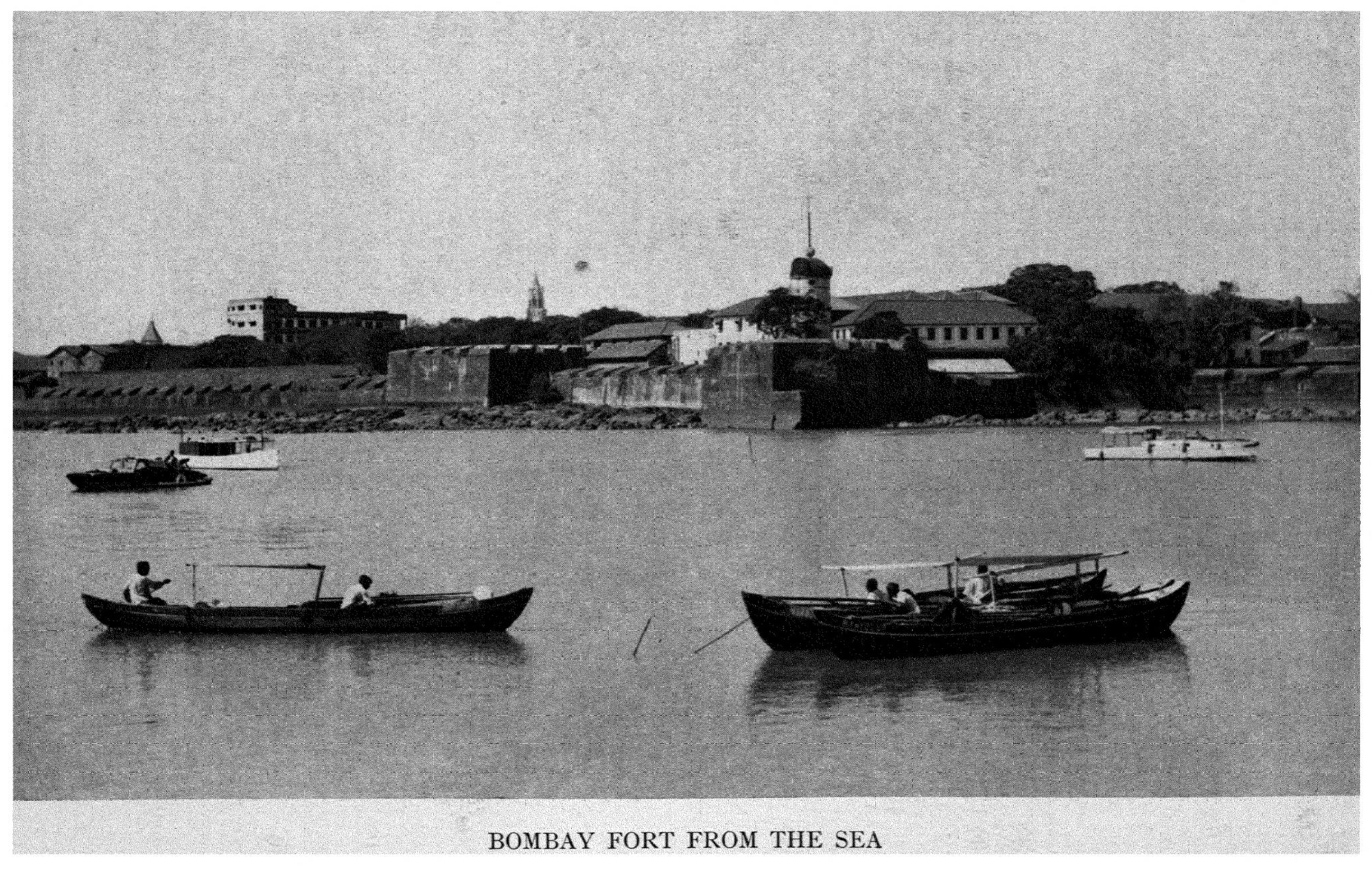
Bombay fort from the sea

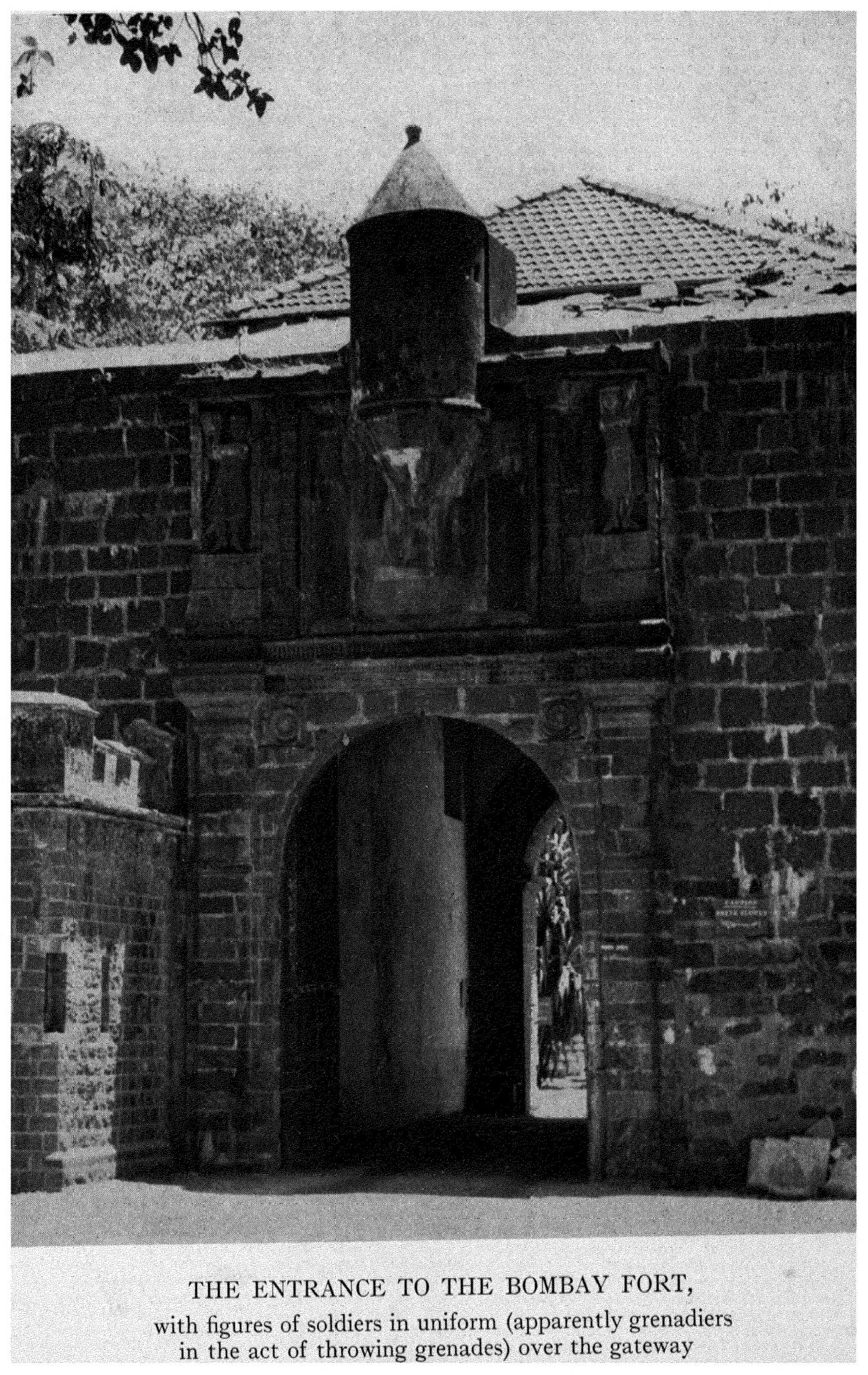
Entrance to the Bombay Fort

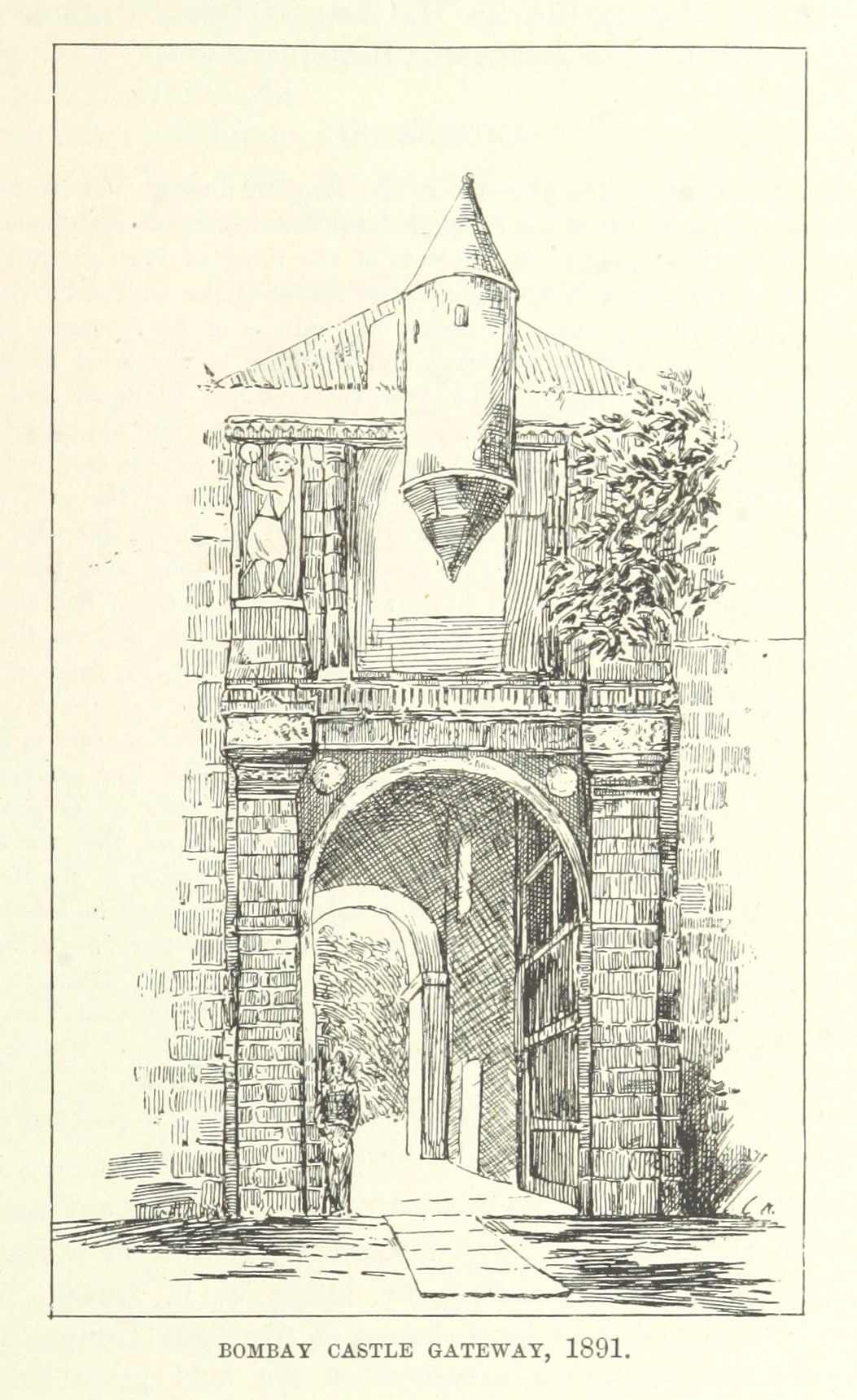
Bombay Castle Gateway, 1891

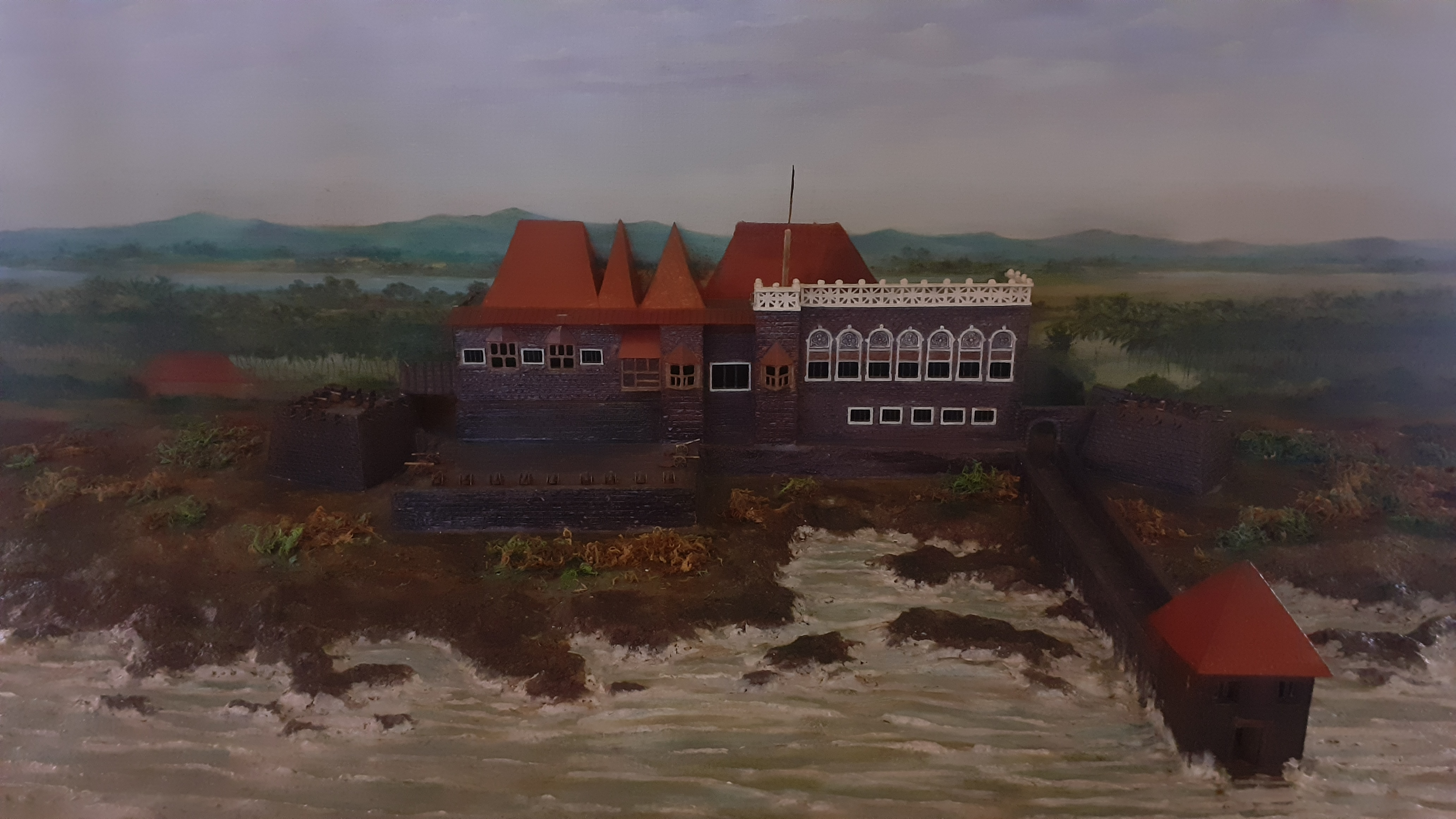
Model of the Bombay Castle at Bhau Daji Lad Museum

== See also ==
- Fort George, Mumbai
- Dongri Fort
