= J. N. Petit Library =

Membership library in Mumbai, India

- 18.9345°N 72.8324°E
- Location: Dadabhai Naoroji Road, Azad Maidan; Fort - 400001, India
- Type: Membership library
- Established: 1898
- Architect: Merwanjee Bana
- Branches: 1

Collection
- Items collected: Rare gold-leaf illustrated manuscript of 11th-century epic poem Shahnameh by Ferdowsi
- Size: c. 150,000

Access and use
- Members: c. 2000

The J. N. Petit Library (officially the J. N. Petit Institute) is a membership library in a Grade II heritage structure in Fort, Mumbai. It was founded in 1898 by a group of Parsi students studying at Elphinstone College. Membership is open to residents of Mumbai.

The library is one of the finest examples of Neo-Gothic architecture in Mumbai. In 2014–15, it was restored by a team led by the conservation architect Vikas Dilawari. The restoration project won the Award of Distinction under the UNESCO Asia-Pacific Awards for Cultural Heritage Conservation in 2015.

== History ==
The library traces its origins to a smaller library that was set up in 1856 by students of Elphinstone College who were living in Fort. In the beginning, it was called the "Fort Improvement Library". In 1895, the Parsi philanthropist Bai Dinbai Nusserwanji Petit donated ₹250,000 for the construction of a library building, to be erected in memory of her deceased son, Jamsetjee Nesserwanjee Petit or J. N. Petit. The library was inaugurated on 1 May 1898. Today, it is run by a private trust, which depends on donations and membership fees.

== Architecture ==
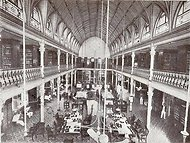
The library interiors in the early-20th century.

The library is considered to be among the finest examples of Gothic Revival architecture in the city. It was designed in the Venetian Gothic variant with a polychromatic limestone exterior. It has two storeys and a mezzanine, and the high-ceilinged reading room has stained glass portraits of the Petit family.

=== Restoration ===
Between 2014 and 2015, the library was restored by the conservation architect Vikas Dilawari and his team. Both exteriors and interiors, including the Reading Room, were restored to the original state. The stained glass was restored by Swati Chandgadkar, one of the country's few glass restorers. In 2015, the restoration project won the Award of Distinction under the UNESCO Asia-Pacific Awards for Cultural Heritage Conservation.

== Collection ==
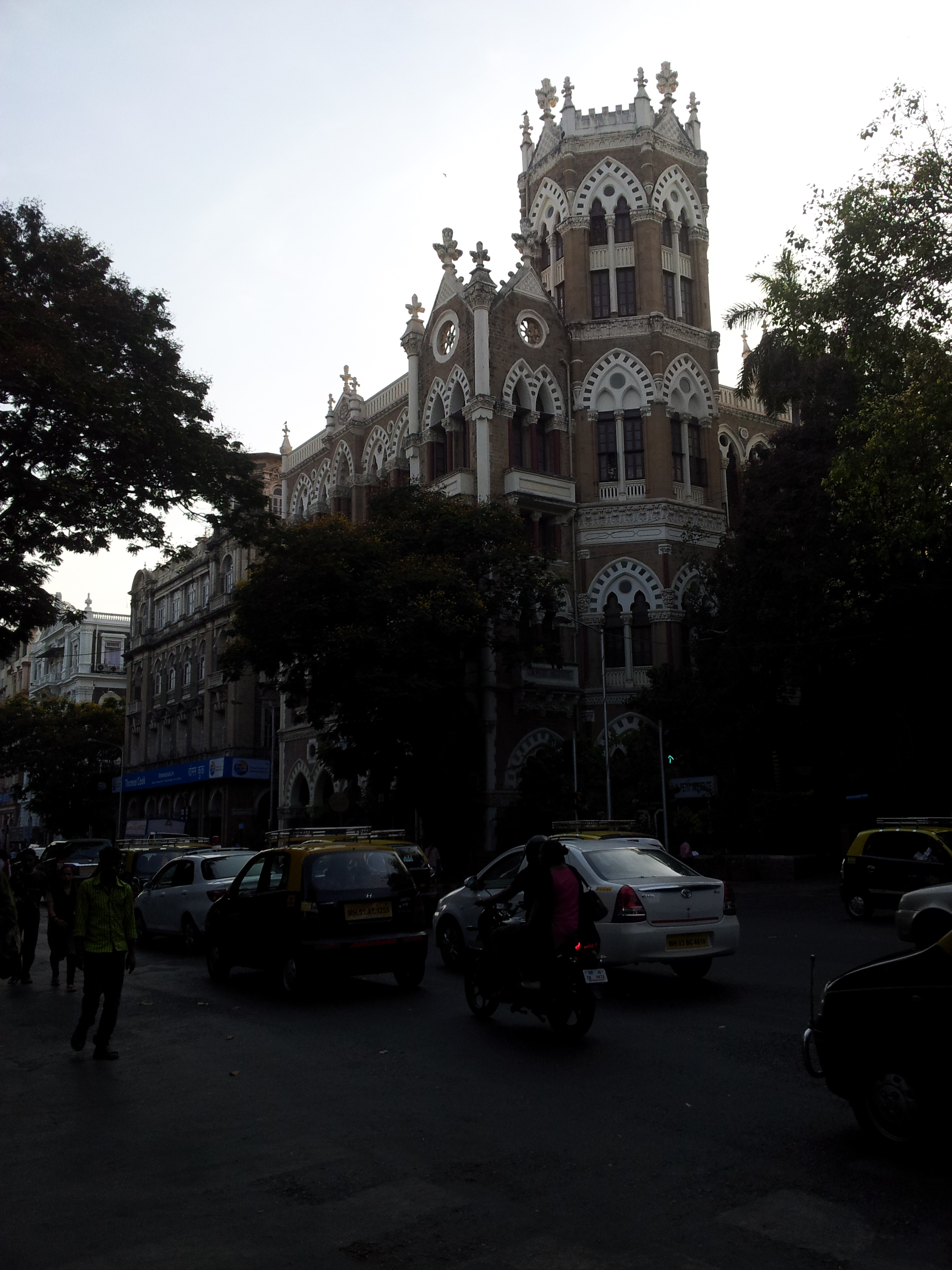
The library today

The library has about 150,000 books and a strong collection on Zoroastrianism that includes old manuscripts. The collection comprises mostly English language-books, but there are some in other languages, including Marathi, Hindi, Gujarati, Sanskrit, Urdu and Persian. It has a rare copy of the 11th-century epic poem Shahname by Ferdowsi, which is illustrated with gold leaf.

== Membership ==
There is a tiered system for membership, which is open to all residents of the city. The current member strength is about 2,000.
