= Bomanjee Hormarjee Wadia Clock Tower =

Clock tower in Mumbai, India

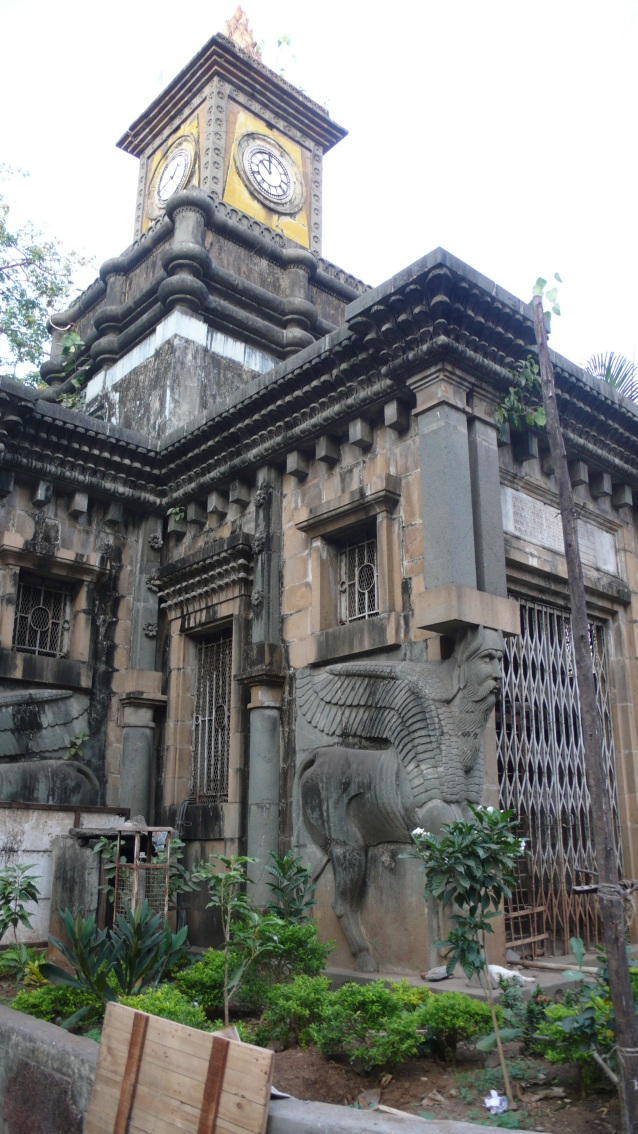

- Location within Mumbai Location within India
- 18.934320°N 72.835840°E
- Location: Perin Nariman Street

History
- Built: 1882

Site notes
- Area: Fort, Mumbai
- Architectural style: Persian architecture

Bomanjee Hormarjee Wadia Clock Tower is a heritage structure in Fort, Mumbai, India, that was erected in 1882 using public funds as a token of appreciation for Bomanjee Hormarjee Wadi, a Parsi philanthropist who had contributed to the cause of education in the city. He was a member of the Bombay Native Education Society and on the board of Elphinstone Institution (now Elphinstone College). He died on 3 July 1862.

The building had a functional drinking fountain, and the facade has many elements of Persian architecture, like lamassus at every entrance, and ornate acanthus leaf cornices. The structure was in extremely poor condition and was repeatedly vandalised (the glass and hands from clock face were often stolen), but it was restored by a team led by conservation architect Vikas Dilawari, with funding from the Kala Ghoda Association, in 2017. The restoration project on the tower won the Honourable Mention under the UNESCO Asia-Pacific Awards for Cultural Heritage Conservation.
