= Mulji Jetha Fountain =

Memorial fountain in Mumbai, India

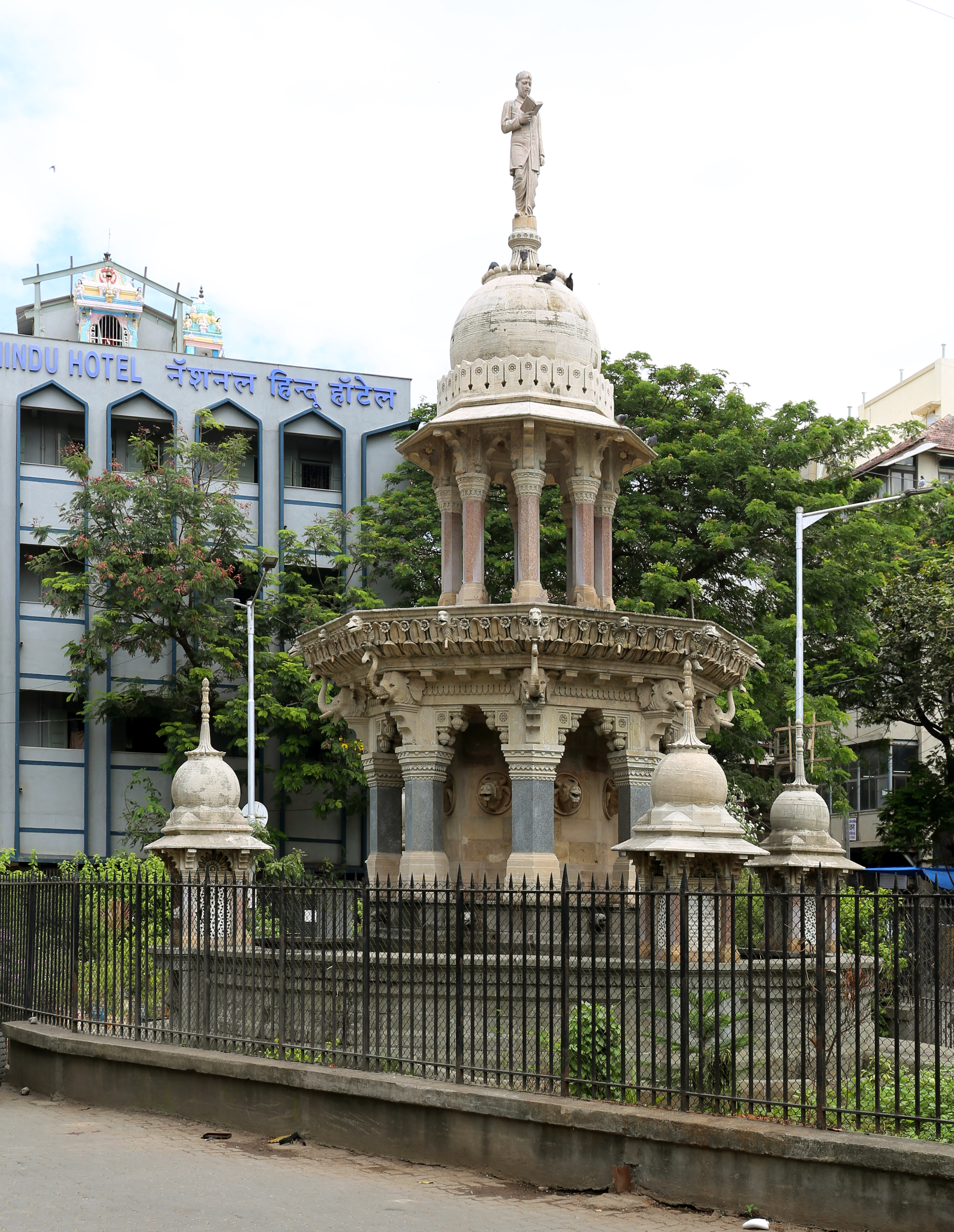
- The Mulji Jetha Fountain, post restoration, in 2019
- Type: Drinking fountain (former)
- Location: Fort, Mumbai, India
- Coordinates: 18.934320°N 72.835840°E
- Built: 1894; 131 years ago
- Built for: Dharamsee Mulji
- Restored: 2017; 8 years ago
- Restored by: Vikas Dilawari Architects
- Architect: Frederick William Stevens (designer); John Griffiths (sculptor)
- Architectural style(s): Indo-Saracenic

Mulji Jetha Fountain is a listed heritage structure in Fort, Mumbai that was erected in 1894, following a commission by Ruttonsee Mulji, a cotton merchant who sought to commemorate the death of his only son, Dharamsi Mulji, who died aged 15 in 1889. The statue of a boy on top holding a book represents the son who loved reading. The drinking fountain was designed by architect Frederick William Stevens (who also designed the Victoria Terminus), and he was assisted by John Griffiths, the then principal of Sir Jamsetjee Jeejebhoy School of Art.

The structure is built in Indo-Saracenic style and the carvings employ many Indian motifs. Elephant heads have been used as corbels and water spouts are rendered in the shape of animal heads. After decades of neglect, the fountain was restored in 2017 with funds raised by the Kala Ghoda Association. The plumbing was restored as well to make it functional again.
