= Christ Church, Byculla =

CNI church in Byculla, Mumbai, India

Coordinates: 18°58′09″N 72°49′54″E

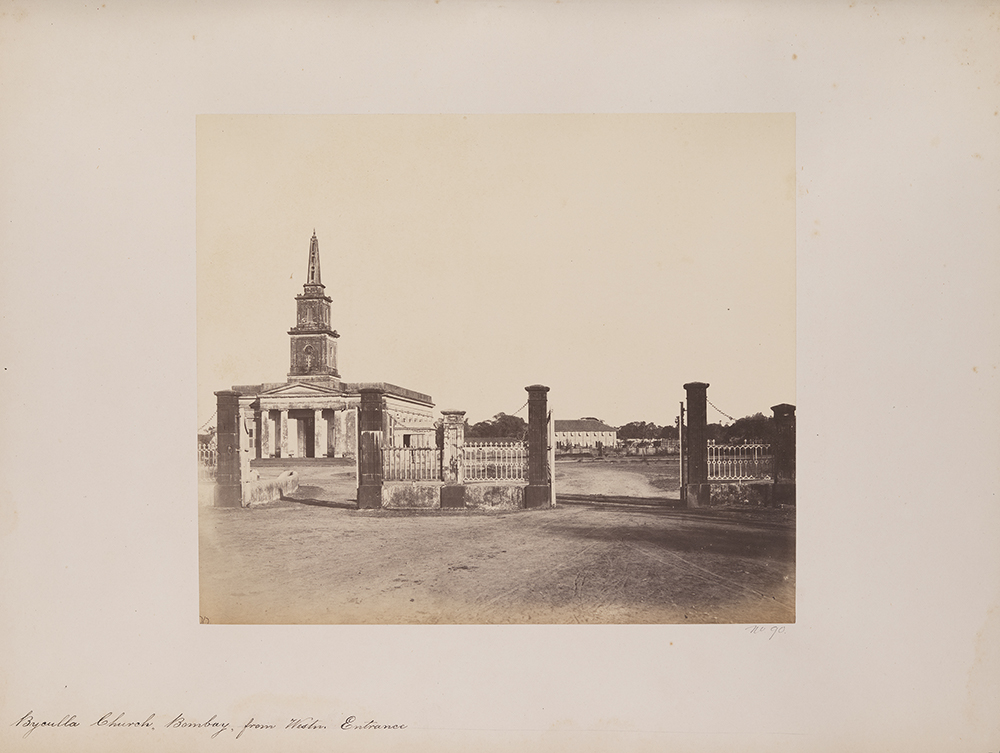
The church's western entrance in the late 1850s

Christ Church in Byculla, Mumbai, is affiliated to the Church of North India and was built in 1833 as an Anglican church. The church's establishment has been the subject of a myth that it was built to suit the convenience of the Governor of Bombay, Mountstuart Elphinstone, who reportedly had to earlier travel from his central Bombay residence in Parel to St Thomas Cathedral in South Bombay. Elphinstone had already left India in 1829. The church was, in fact, built during the governorship of John FitzGibbon, 2nd Earl of Clare, who laid the foundation stone in July, 1832.

Along with the Church of St Andrew and St Columba in South Bombay, Christ Church was one of the last 19th-century churches in the city to be built in the Neoclassical style, as Gothic Revival emerged as the preferred style thereafter. It was built by a Portuguese architect called Augusto. The first service was held on 10 August 1833, but the church was only consecrated in December 1835 by Revd. Daniel Wilson, the then Bishop of Calcutta. In 2017, the church's restoration project led by conservation architect Vikas Dilawari won the Award of Merit under the UNESCO Asia-Pacific Awards for Cultural Heritage Conservation.

== History ==
The church's establishment is closely associated with the affairs of Christ Church School, which was founded as a charity institution by the Bombay Education Society at St Thomas Cathedral, Fort in 1816–17. Following a government order, the school moved to the Byculla site in 1825. In 1831, for the benefit of the children, a plan for a church was announced. The education society pledged ₹10,000, and the government gave an equal grant on the condition that the children be provided "sittings free of charge". In July 1832, John FitzGibbon, 2nd Earl of Clare, the then Governor of Bombay, laid the foundation stone and the building was ready by August 1833. Though the first service was held on 10 August 1833, the church was only consecrated two years later in December 1935 by Revd. Daniel Wilson, the then Bishop of Calcutta.

The church is home to one of the city's few pipe organs, but like most of them it is non-functional. It was made by the London-based Gray and Davison for £300 some time in the 19th century.

== Design and architecture ==
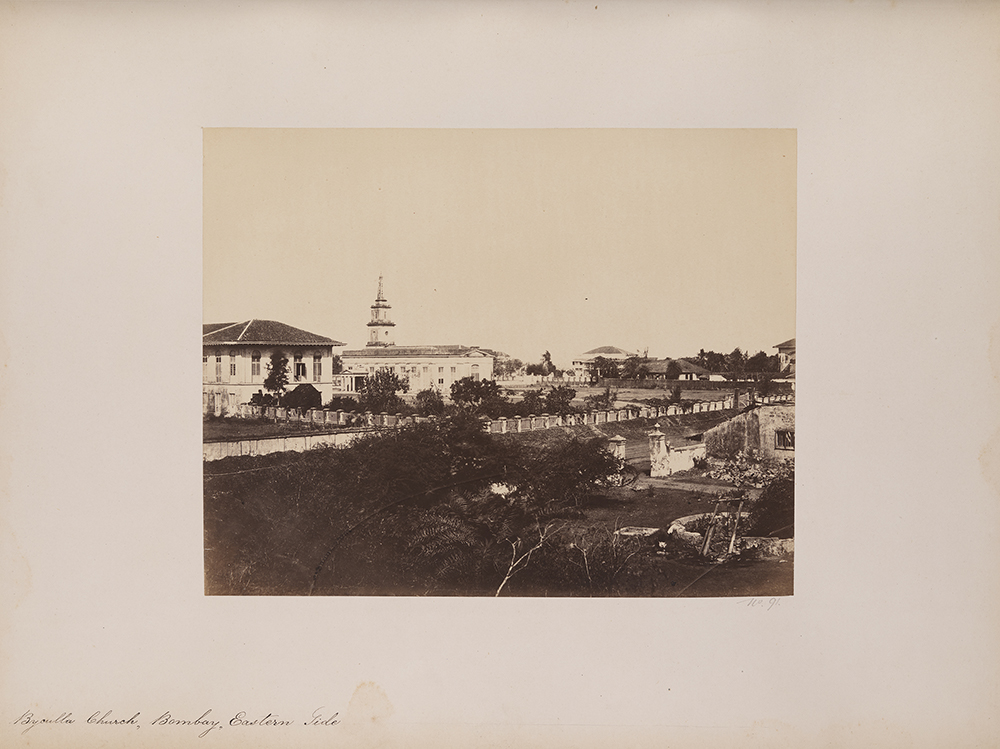
Christ Church, as viewed from the east, c. 1855

The church is built after the style of St. Martin-in-the-Fields in London. Christ Church was one of the last 19th-century churches to be built in the Neoclassical style, as thereafter the architects found themselves drawn towards the Gothic Revival style, as can be seen in Emmanuel Church (1869) and All Saints' Church, Malabar Hill (1881). The church has a Greek Doric portico built with columns imported from England. Originally, the columns were to be used in the Mumbai Town Hall, which was being built at the same time, but on arrival they were judged to be oversized for that project.

=== Stained glass ===
In August 1868, a brief report appeared in The Builder, a 19th-century architectural journal, which read: "Mr. J Scott, stained glass manufacturers, Carlisle, has just completed a stained glass window for the church of Byculla in India. Its dimensions are 14 ft by 9 ft, and it is divided into six lights, the whole of which are filled with grissaile work. Near the top of the centre light is a wreath surrounding the arms of Spencer Compton, in whose memory the window is to be placed in the church." The Spencer Compton mentioned was not the Marquess of Northampton, but a prothonotary at the Bombay High Court. Mr. J Scott refers to John Scott Jr. of the Carlisle firm John Scott & Son, which was founded by the father and son named John Scott (the father died in 1865).

=== Restoration project ===
The church was sensitively restored between 2013 and 2016 for the first time in its history, as earlier efforts were ill-executed or inappropriate. The historic teak wood trusses were strengthened, the Corinthian columns inside the church were gilded in gold, stained glass and the architectural details of the facade, which had been compromised earlier, were restored. The conservation project received the Award of Merit under the UNESCO Asia-Pacific Awards for Cultural Heritage Conservation in 2017.

== Bibliography ==
- Mackenzie Maclean, James (1876). A Guide to Bombay: Historical, Statistical and Descriptive. Bombay Gazette Steam Press.
