= Christ Church School =

Location
- Mumbai, Maharashtra; India; 18.969508°N 72.831447°E

Information
- Type: Co-educational, Private
- Motto: Accepto Robore Sargam
- Religious affiliation: Christian
- Established: 1815; 211 years ago
- Founder: Rev. Richard Cobbe
- Faculty: 140
- Enrollment: 3100
- Average class size: 40
- Student to teacher ratio: 16:1
- Campus: 20 acres (81,000 m^{2})
- Colors: Red, Green, Navy Blue, Golden Yellow
- Athletics: All Mumbai
- Athletics conference: ICSE
- Mascot: None
- Website: www.christchurchschoolmumbai.org

Christ Church School is a private coeducational prep school located in Mumbai, India. It is a Christian school, founded in 1815, under the auspices of the Bombay Education Society. It has close to 3800 students, all of whom are night scholars. The school is twinned with Barnes School, in Deolali, Nashik. Both schools follow the ICSE curriculum. It is located in Byculla, just ahead of the JJ flyover. The school is located on Clare Road, or as it is locally called, Mirza Ghalib Marg.

== History ==
In the early 1700s, the Rev. Richard Cobbe was appointed chaplain to the British East India Company's Factory in Bombay. In 1718, he founded a small school where twelve poor boys were given free housing, clothing, food, and education. The school, which had one teacher, was located in a building not far from the present-day Cathedral of St. Thomas in Fort, Mumbai.

After nearly a century, the Ven. Archdeacon George Barnes, also with the East India Company, realised that the original school could not possibly meet the needs of hundreds of children it then looked after. He appealed for funds, and started the Bombay Education Society in 1815. The original school was taken over by the BES, and numbers grew rapidly until it was apparent that new grounds and school buildings were essential. A large site at Byculla was given by the Government for the building of the school, and the new school buildings were opened in 1825. One of the copper plates commemorating the opening is on the wall of Evan's Hall in Barnes School, while the other remains with Christ Church School.

The parish church Christ Church, Byculla was later built on part of the land given originally to the BES, and remains there to this day. Much of the original land was later sold to help in the building of Barnes, which was established in 1925 as a school for boarders. The BES schools, as they were popularly known, were primarily boarding schools for Anglo-Indian boys and girls, mainly belonging to the Anglican Church. However, day-scholars were later admitted, and they were of all castes and creeds. In the early 1900s, the BES merged with the Indo British institution which had been founded by Rev. George Candy, in 1837. In 1925, two new schools were established - one for day-students only (Christ Church School), and one for boarders and day-students (Barnes School).

== Campus and facilities ==
The school is spread across a large campus. The main building is a long, three-storey structure which houses the 1st to 10th grade classes, the ISC classes, the IGCSE classrooms as well as the science laboratories, teacher's rooms and administration offices.

At the other end of the school stands a fourteen-storey building which houses the kindergarten classes, and staff quarters, along with the woodwork room. This building also houses the music room. In between the two buildings lie a hall (used for morning assembly and school functions), a tennis lawn, a basketball court, and a children's playground. The school has a sports field, which is used for its sports activities, as well as for athletics.

== Faculty ==
There is a 16:1 student to teacher ratio. Some of the faculty live on campus, in apartments located in a building which also house the kindergarten school classes. The apartment is located at one end of the school field. Each teacher is affiliated to a house, and each house has a House President for the girls and boys respectively. As part of their House duties, teachers oversee the selection and training of students for participation in inter-house activities. Most of the training is done by the Captain and vice captain of the house.

== Heads of Staff ==
- Principal : Mr.G.Heiden

== Notable alumni ==
- Jalal Agha, actor featured in the song "Mehbooba Mehbooba" from Sholay
- Mahesh Kothare, actor and director of Marathi films.
- Nasser Hussain, Captain of India national rugby union team
- Abbas Tyrewala, Film director and writer
