= Richard Lockwood Boulton =

English sculptor

- Born: c. 1832; Thornton Dale, Yorkshire, England
- Died: 23 January 1905 (aged 72–73); Bournemouth, England
- Occupations: Sculptor, artist
- Years active: 1851–1893
- Known for: Messrs R. L. Boulton & Sons

Richard Lockwood Boulton (c. 1832–1905) was an English sculptor who founded the firm Messrs R. L. Boulton & Sons. It was centred in Cheltenham, England, and built monuments made of iron and stone in the United Kingdom.

== Biography ==
=== Family ===
Boulton was born around 1832 in Thornton Dale, North Yorkshire. His father, Richard Boulton, was born around 1792 and was also a stonemason. Around 1822, his older brother, William Boulton, was born. William went on to run his own masonry business in Southwark. Richard Lockwood Boulton started training as a stonemason and then began working with his brother. In 1855, he left his brother's business and moved to Birmingham where he married Martha Mary Dutson (born 1834 in Herefordshire). They had five children, including Lockwood Dutson (1857–1927), Richard William (1859-1935), Thomas Dutson (1860–1932), Gilbert Dutson (1866–1936) and Martha Miriam Dutson (born 1867). Lockwood Dutson, Richard William, Thomas Dutson and Gilbert Dutson all followed their father by becoming sculptors and stonemasons. In 1861, Lockwood Dutson worked on Worcester Cathedral, and Gilbert Dutson made the statues in St Cuthbert's Church, Earls Court.

In August 1873 Boulton's wife, Martha Mary, died. In 1875 he remarried to Fanny Cowley Woodward at All Saints Church, Cheltenham. With her he had five more children: Frank Cowley (born Sep 1876), Bertha (1879-1955), Evelyn May (1880-1961), Mabel Maria (1881-1965) and Florence Marianne (1886-1972). Frank Cowley joined his half-brothers in the masonry firm.

=== Cheltenham ===
Around 1870, Boulton moved to Cheltenham. In 1871, he had moved his workshop to London Road in Charlton Kings. Later, the workshop was on Bath Road in Cheltenham. At one stage he was employing 21 people in the firm, which included Herbert Henry Martyn.

== R. L. Boulton and Sons ==
In 1893, Boulton retired and his sons took over the business. On 23 January 1905, Boulton died in Bournemouth and was buried next to his first wife in the churchyard of St Mary's Church in Charlton Kings. His sons continued running the firm. There is no record of its existence after 1972.

== Works ==
Various works by the firm R. L. Boulton & Sons include:

- St Ann's Church, Stretford, brasswork (1863)
- St Michael's Cemetery, Sheffield, altar (1863)
- Church of St Cynllo, fittings, Llangynllo, Ceredigion (1869)
- St Gregory's Church, Cheltenham, carvings (1876)
- St Mary's Church, Warrington, fittings (1877)
- St Anno's Church, Llananno, Powys screen (1880)
- St Michael and All Angels Church reredos, Aberystwyth (1890)
- Neptune Fountain, Cheltenham (1892)
- St Dominic's Convent, altar, North Adelaide, Australia (1892)
- St Alban's Church, Warrington, fittings (1893)
- St Catherine's Church, Littlehampton, altar (1904)
- Boer War Memorial, Cheltenham (1907)
- Church of St John the Evangelist, Poulton-le-Fylde, reredos and altar (1913)
- Christ Church, altar, Aberbeeg, Wales (1913)
- Edward VII statue, Montpellier Gardens, Cheltenham (1914)
- Cheltenham Minster, reredos, Cheltenham (1916)
- Cheltenham Town Hall, statues of King Edward VII and King George V, Cheltenham (1916)
- London and North Western Railway War Memorial
- St Paul's Church, north chapel, Cheltenham (1932)
- Our Lady and St Non Chapel statue, St Davids, Pembrokeshire
- Statues of Aesculapius, Hygeia and Hippocrates in Pittville Pump Room, Cheltenham (1965)
- Sculptures for Royal Alfred Sailors' Home, Bombay (now Maharashtra Police Headquarters)
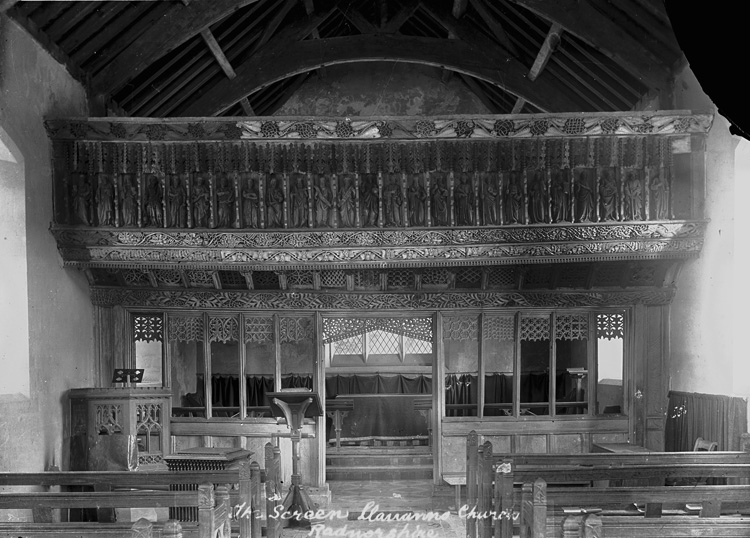
St Anno's Church, Llananno, Powys, screen

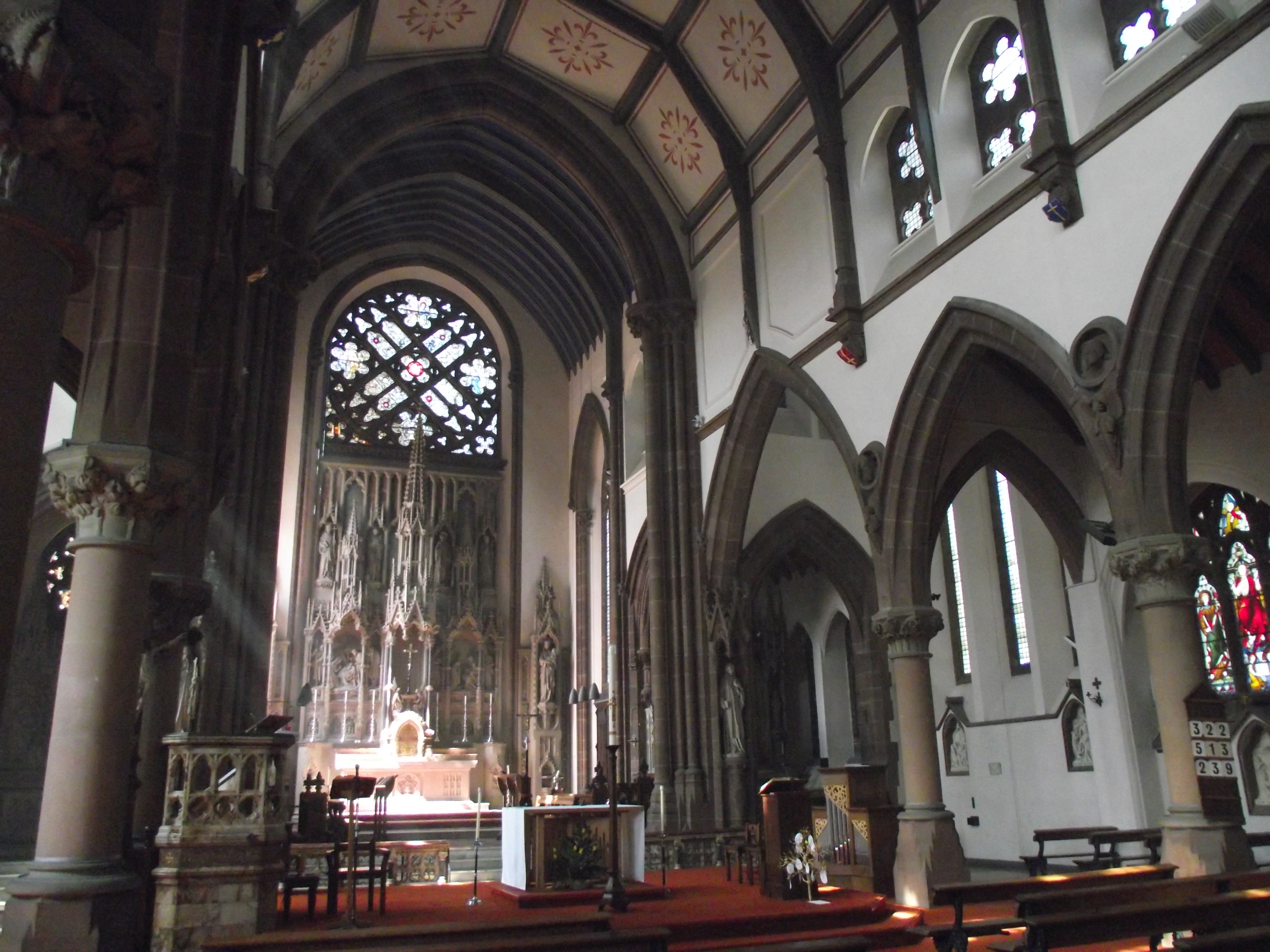
St Mary's Church, Warrington

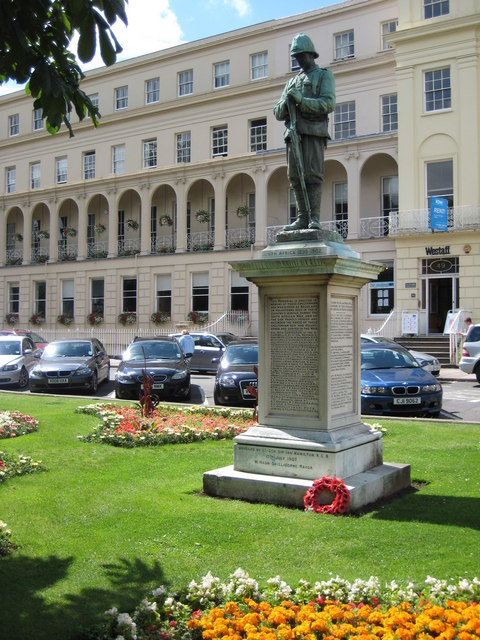
Boer War Memorial, Cheltenham

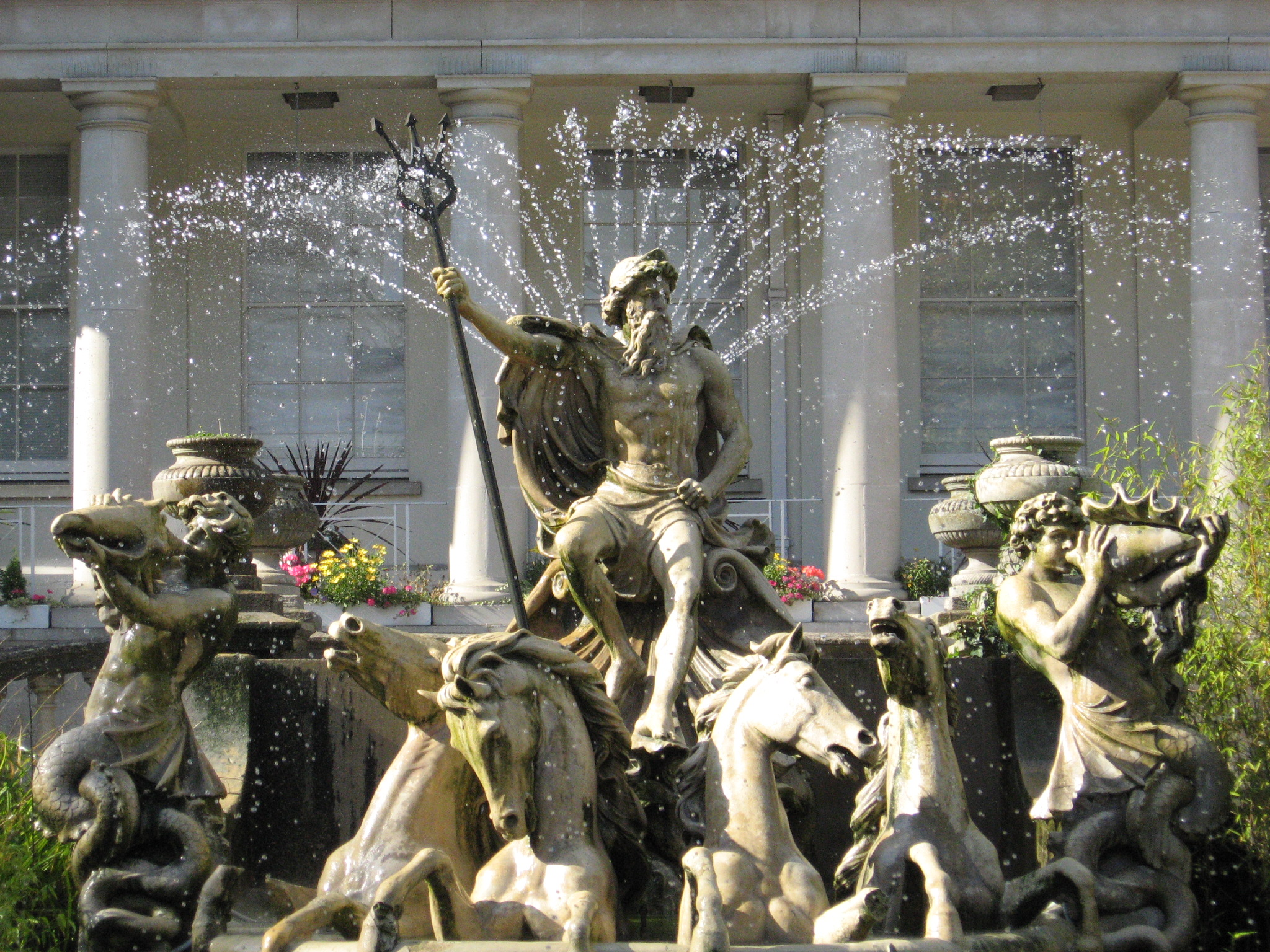
Neptune Fountain, Cheltenham

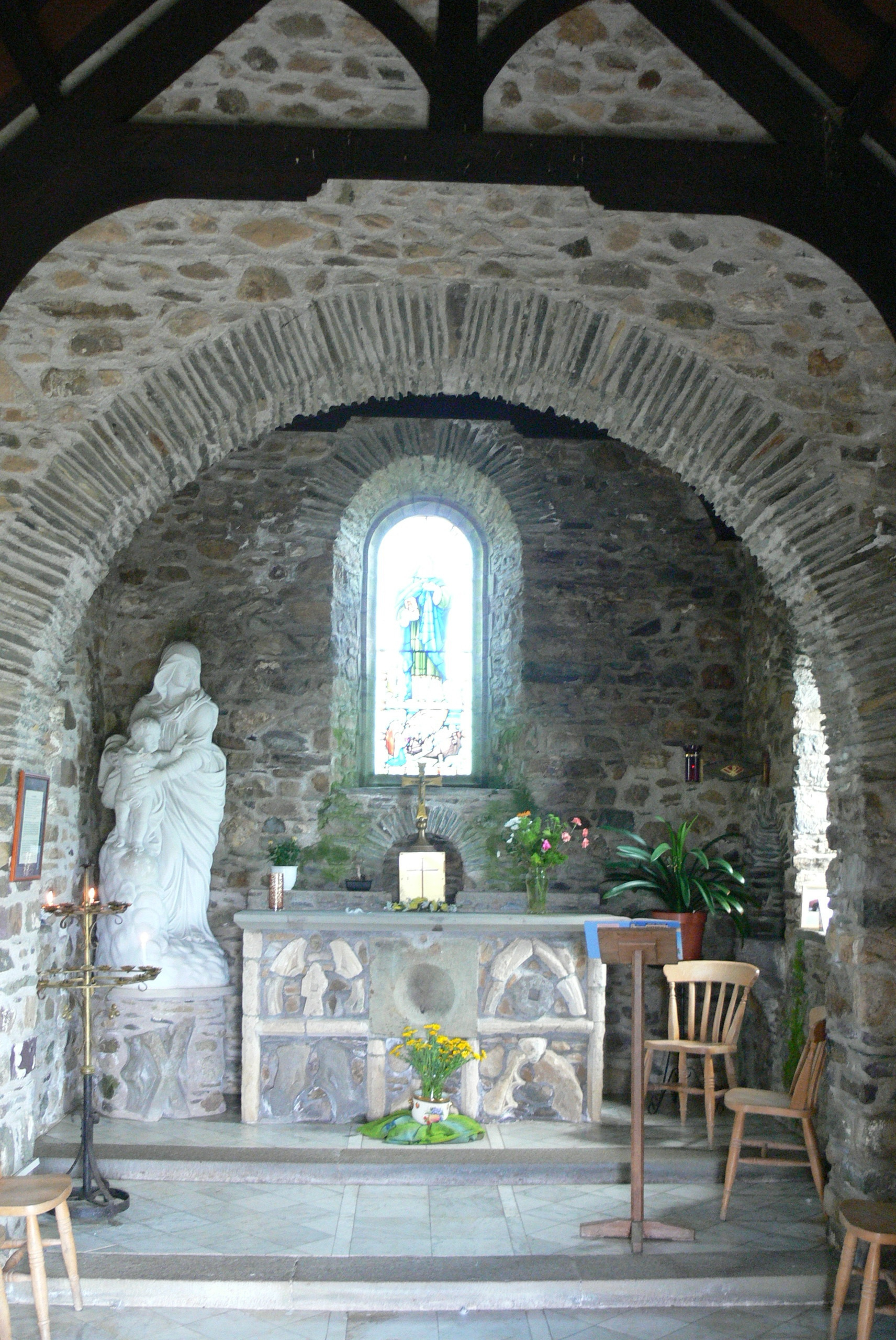
Our Lady and St Non's Chapel, St David's

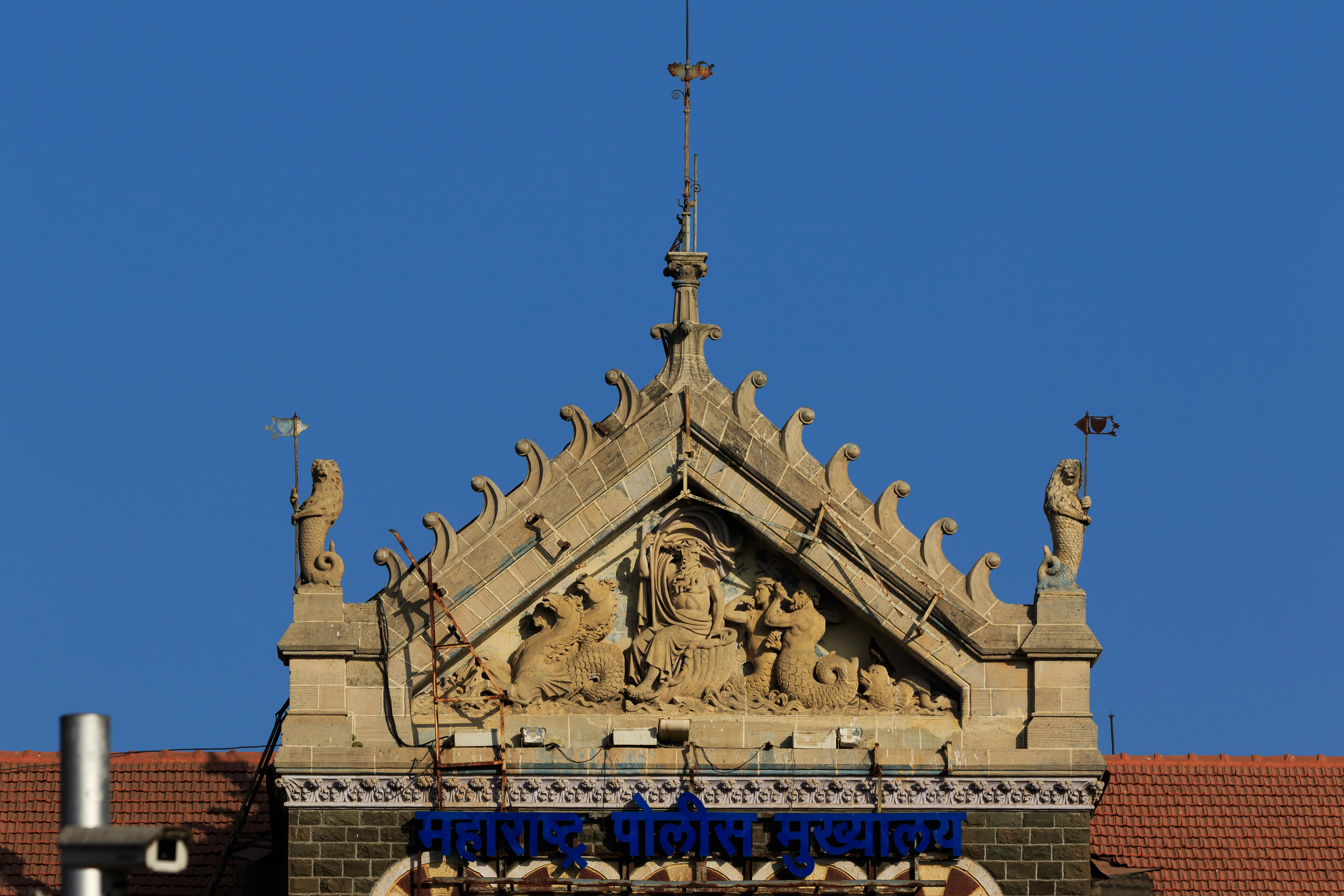
Sculptures for Alfred Sailors' Home, Bombay (now Maharashtra Police Headquarters)
