= Emmanuel Church, Mumbai =

Church in Mumbai, India

Coordinates: 18.9604687°N 72.8127188°E

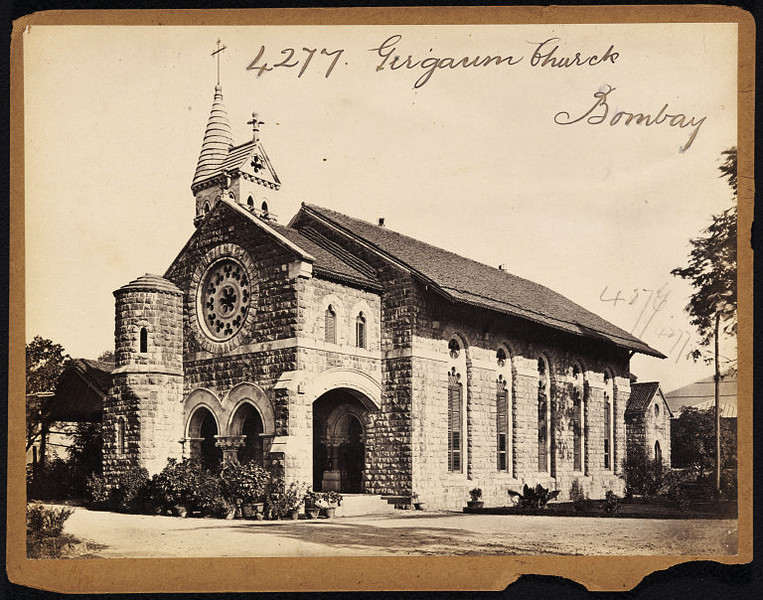
Emmanuel Church in the late-1800s.

Emmanuel Church in Grant Road, Mumbai, India is affiliated to the Church of North India and was built in 1869. The building, constructed in Gothic Revival style, is a Grade II heritage structure and was made using Porbandar stone. It was the first church with an Indian congregation to follow the British Church Mission Society (CMS), and though it now falls under the Church of North India, the parishioners still maintain Anglican practices. It was established by Revd. T. K. Weatherhead of the CMS.
