= L S Raheja School of Architecture =

Architectural school in Bandra, India

L S Raheja School of Architecture is an Architecture Institute in Bandra east, Mumbai. established in the year 1953.

L. S. Raheja School of Architecture, one of the top Architecture college in Mumbai that offer courses in Architecture and Interior Design which include: Undergraduate degree in Architecture (B.Arch), Postgraduate degree in Architecture (M.Arch in Landscape), Undergraduate degree in Interior Design (B.Voc. in Interior Design), and Government Diploma in Interior Design at Top Architecture College.

The college library is a knowledge haven which enriches teaching, learning and research experience for the students and staff. It is well stocked with more than 6000 books, 350 e-books, several design magazines and E- journal subscription on varied subjects like Design, Graphics, Construction, Interiors, Landscape, Architectural Theories and several others.

The current location of the Institute is at bandra east is self owned and the construction of the building was completed in the year 2005 when the institute was finally shifted there.

== Programme ==
It offers 5 Year Bachelor in Architecture programme, affiliated to the University of Mumbai. Annual intake is 80.

Aaakaar is the annual festival of L S Raheja School of Architecture.

== Faculty ==
- Ar. Arvind Khanolkar, Design Chair
- Ar. Mandar Parab, Principal
- Ar. Arun Fizardo, Associate Professor
- Ar. Mridula Pillai, Assistant Professor
- Ar. Anuj Gudekar, Assistant Professor
- Ar. Meghana Ghate, Associate Professor

== Performance in NASA ==
L S Raheja School of architecture has participated in the National Association of Students of Architecture. The college was amongst the founder members of NASA and was participating in the competition from the date of its inception. the college was barred from NASA for a short period and from its re joining the competition in year 2008–09, the college has won the Le Corbusier Trophy in 2011–12, 2012–13 and for the third time in 2013-14 making it a hat trick. The trophy in 2013-14 was shared with Academy of Architecture, Mumbai.
