= Fort George, Mumbai =

Fort George
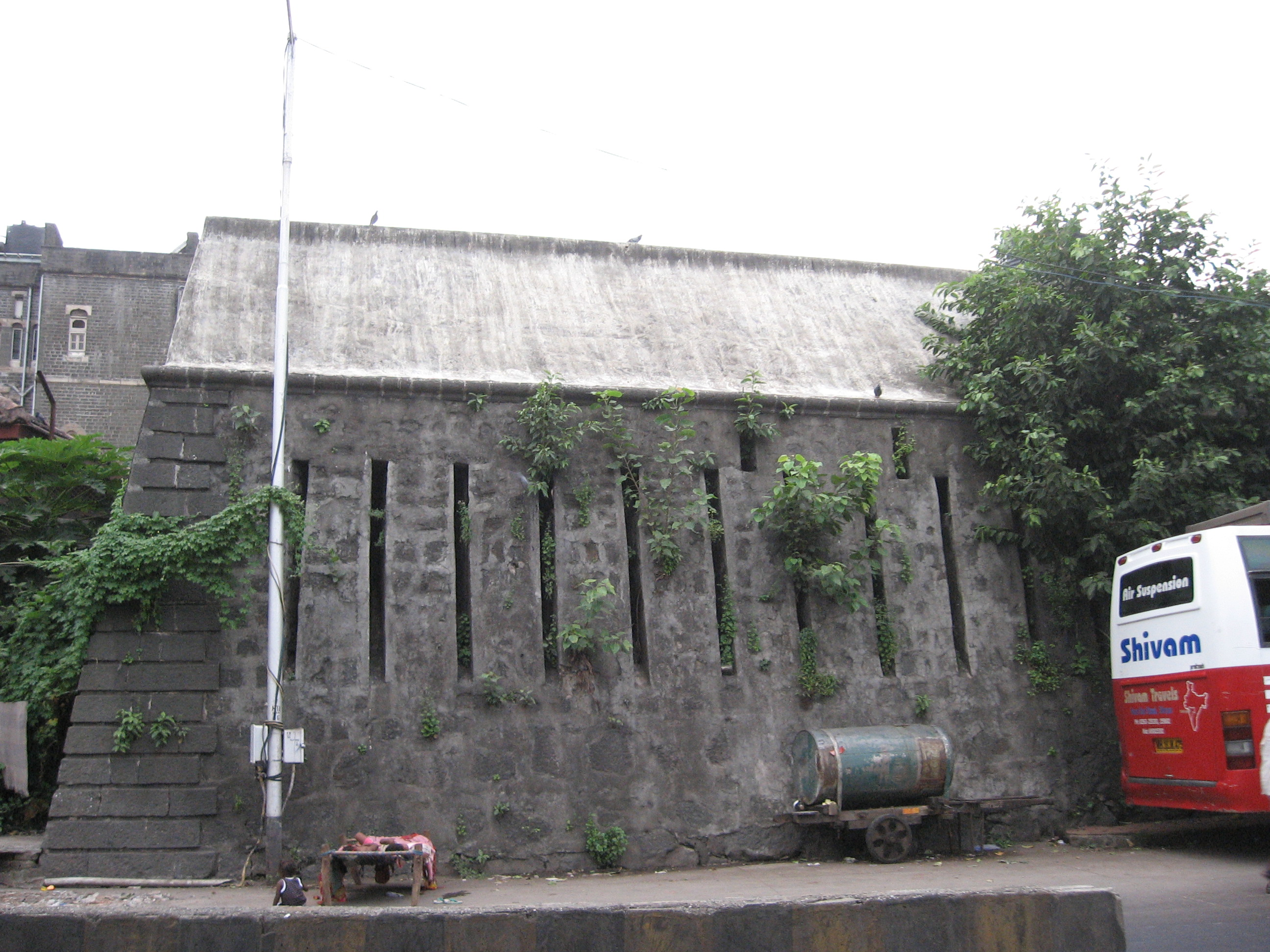
- Remains of the fort wall near St. George Hospital

- Location within Mumbai

General information
- Type: Fort
- Location: Fort, Mumbai
- Coordinates: 18.94090°N 72.83759°E
- Elevation: 13 m (43 ft)
- Current tenants: St George Hospital
- Completed: 1769
- Destroyed: 1862
- Client: British

Fort George was an extension to the fortified walls of Bombay (now officially Mumbai) built in 1769, located in the Fort area to which it lent its name.

The site upon which Fort George was later built was originally occupied by Dongri Fort. The hill on which it was situated, Dongri Hill, was razed in 1739, as it presented a vantage point for Marathi attackers to assault Bombay's fortifications. In 1769, Fort George, named after George III of Great Britain and Ireland, was built. It was the made center of British administration in Bombay Presidency until the Governor's Residence was moved to Parel in 1829. In 1862, the fort, made redundant by the establishment of British hegemony in the area and Bombay's urban growth, was mostly demolished on the orders of Governor Henry Bartle Frere. The north bastion of the fort was left intact, and is currently used by the Directorate of Archeology and Museums, Maharashtra State.

== Gallery ==
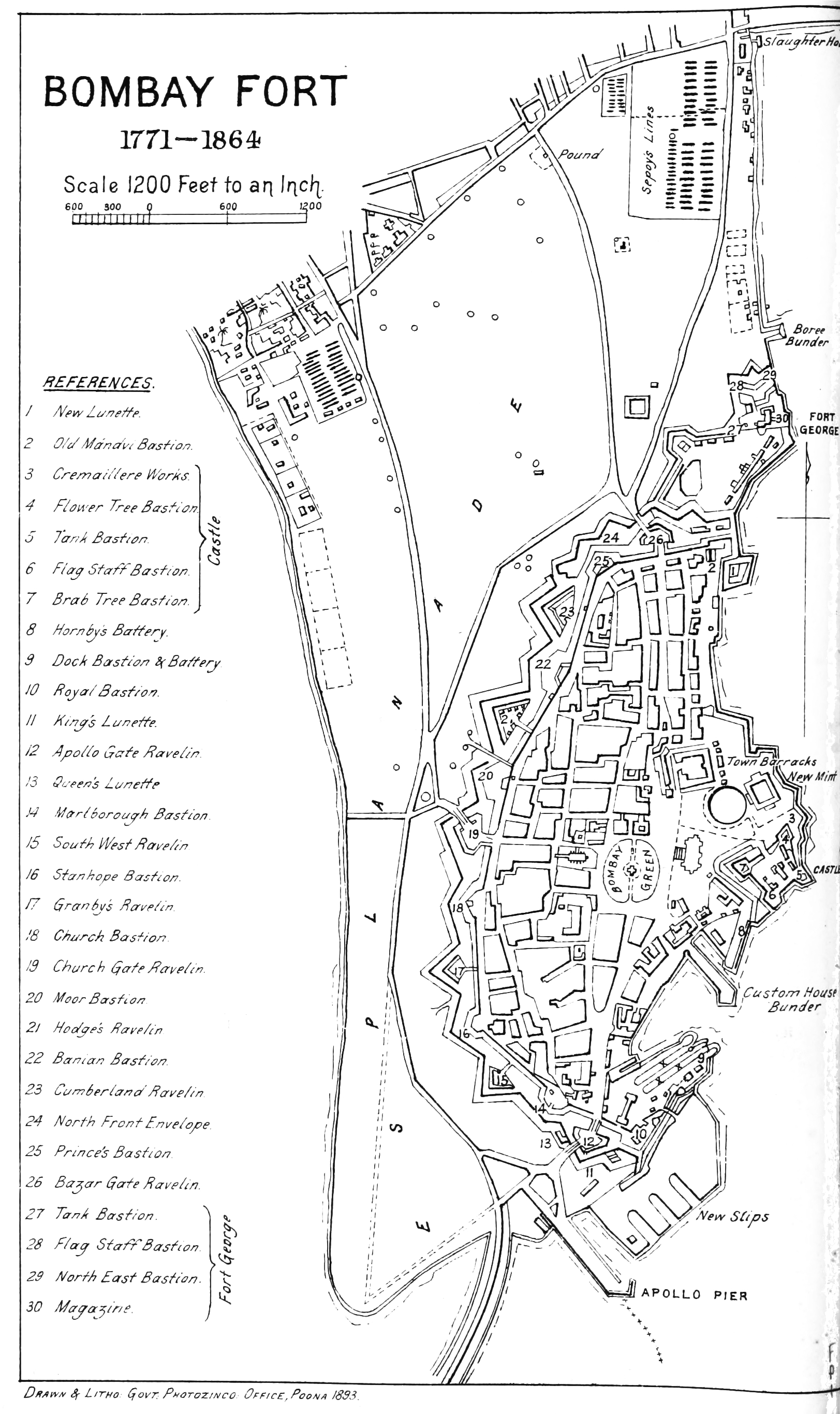
Plan of Bombay fort 1750-1864. Fort George can be seen at the top of Centre Right

== See also ==
- List of forts in Maharashtra
