= Heritage structures in Mumbai =

Heritage in Mumbai

Many heritage structures are found in Mumbai, India.

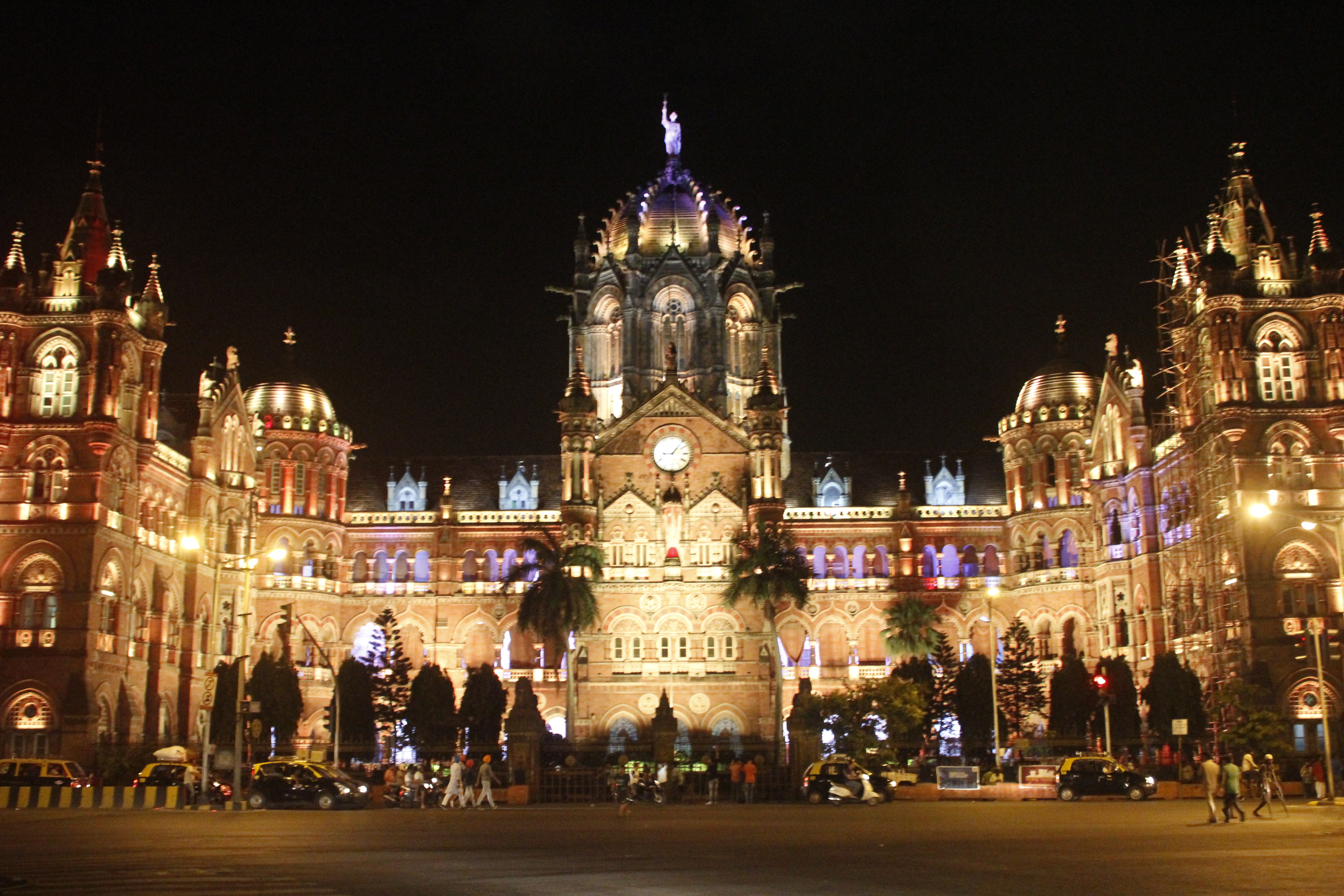
Chhatrapati Shivaji Maharaj Terminus at night

== Background ==
Mumbai consists of seven islands along the coast of the Arabian Sea that are connected by bridges and landfill. It is the capital of the Indian state of Maharashtra and the business and financial capital of India. Mumbai was transferred from Portuguese to British rule as part of Catherine of Braganza’s dowry to King Charles II in 1661. It rose to become India's largest city, driven in large part by its status as a leading cotton trading market and shipping port.

== Heritage structures ==
Mumbai's history offers many heritage structures and historical precincts. Most are located in the south of Mumbai, as historically, access to the city was only through the port there. The southern tip of the city is home to the Fort precinct, the urban core of Mumbai during the colonial period that was once enclosed by fortified walls. Mumbai had 591 heritage structures registered as of 2012. These include buildings, archaeological sites, colonial, industrial, domestic architectural sites and public spaces. A consulting committee called "The Mumbai Heritage Conservation Committee" guides the process. All work related to heritage structures needs approval from this committee. Heritage structures are classified as Grade I, Grade IIA, Grade IIB or Grade III. Most of the structures were built in the British period. They are in the Victorian Neo Gothic architectural style, Indo-Saracenic Revival (Mulji Jetha Fountain) or Neoclassical styles.

The Elephanta Caves, Chhatrapati Shivaji Maharaj Terminus and The Victorian & Art Deco Ensemble of Mumbai are recognised as UNESCO World Heritage Sites.

Mumbai is home to a large number of Art Deco structures, with the largest count of buildings in this style after Miami. Many of these buildings are cinema halls, such as Eros Cinema and Regal Cinema. A string of Art Deco apartment buildings lines the city's waterfront promenade, Marine Drive.

== Awards ==
Some Mumbai heritage structures have received Unesco awards. The Lal Chimney Compound received an award of distinction in the 2013 UNESCO Asia-Pacific Heritage Awards and the Royal Bombay Yacht Club Residential Chambers won an award of merit in the 2013 UNESCO Asia-Pacific Heritage Awards.

== Mumbai Heritage Walks ==
Walking tours expose many residents and visitors to the structures. They are sponsored by the Mumbai Heritage Walks group, established in 1999. The group was established by city architects Abha Bahl and Brinda Gaitonde. Their aim is to "raise the awareness of the people of Mumbai and visitors, about the city’s architecture and heritage monuments. Personalized, educative and imaginative; the walking tours highlight the vast range of architectural styles, planning elements and ornamental details, tracing the social and cultural history of the city."

== See also ==
- J. N. Petit Library
- List of Monuments of National Importance in Mumbai circle
- Municipal Corporation Building, Mumbai
- Chhatrapati Shivaji Terminus railway station
- Timeline of Mumbai history
