= Frederick William Stevens =

English architectural engineer

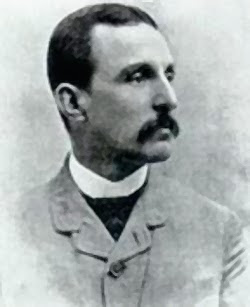
- Born: 11 November 1847; Bath, Somerset, England, United Kingdom
- Died: 5 March 1900 (age 52); Bombay, Bombay Presidency, India
- Years active: 1870s–1890s

Frederick William Stevens (11 November 1847 – 5 March 1900) was an English architectural engineer who worked for the British colonial government in India. Stevens' most notable design was the railway station Victoria Terminus in Bombay (in 1996, it was renamed the Chhatrapati Shivaji Terminus in Mumbai).

Stevens also designed the Municipal Corporation Building, Mumbai the Royal Alfred Sailor's Home, the Army and Navy Building at Kala Ghoda, the Post-Office Mews at Apollo Bunder, the head offices of the BB&CI Railway at Churchgate, and the Oriental Life Assurance Offices at the Flora Fountain. He also designed the Rajmahal Palace at Mehsana.

He died on 5 March 1900 following malaria and was buried in the Sewri Christian Cemetery.

His name and statue can be seen in a scene in the 2008 film Slumdog Millionaire.
