= Fort (Mumbai precinct) =

Fort Fort District
- Subdistrict or Historic area
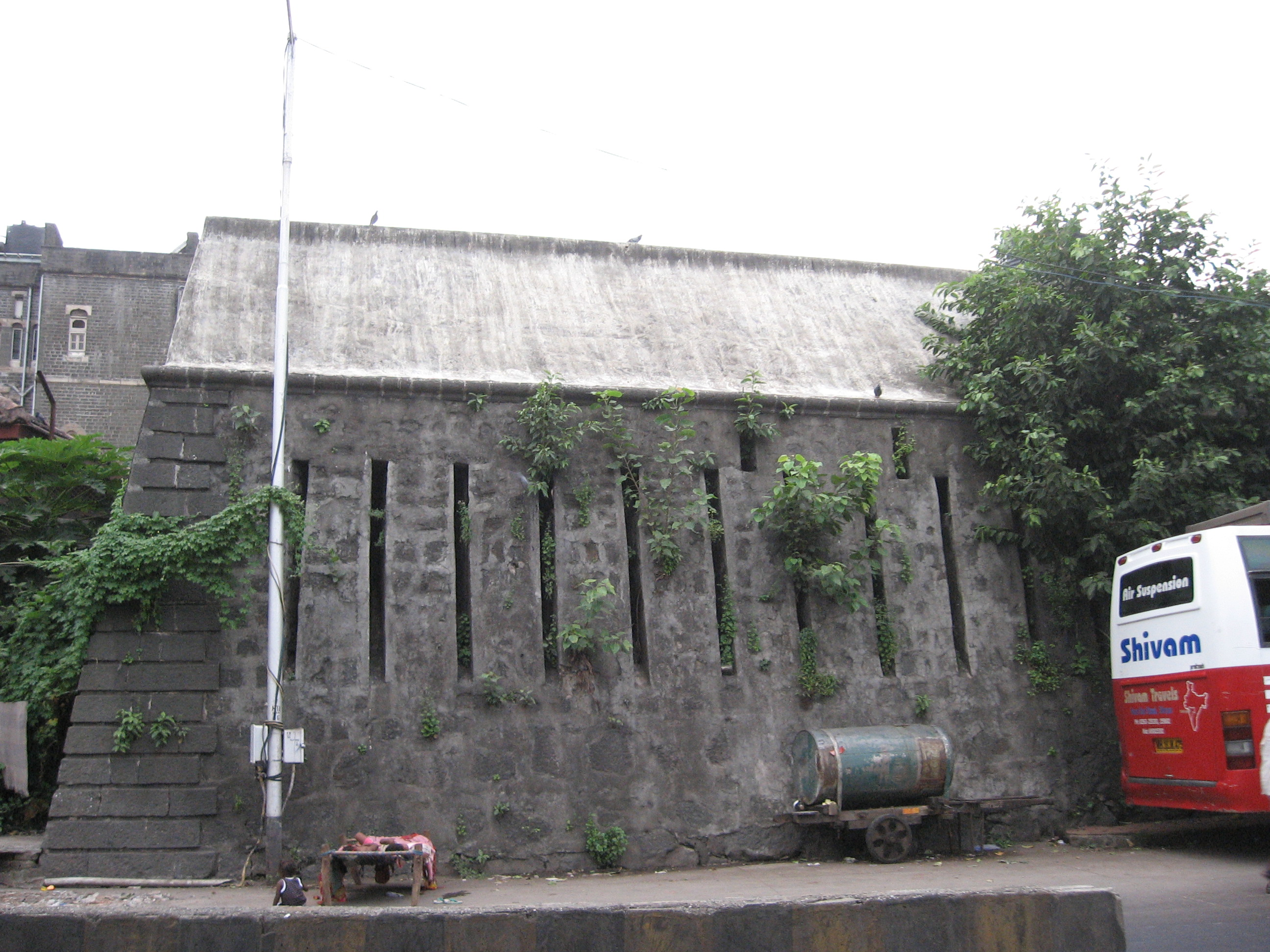
- Remains of the Fort George walls

- Location within Mumbai
- Coordinates: 18.935°N 72.8359°E
- Country: India
- State: Maharashtra
- District: Mumbai City
- Metro: Mumbai
- Zone: 1
- Ward: A

Government
  - Type: Municipal corporation
  - Body: Brihanmumbai Municipal Corporation (MCGM)
- Elevation: 11 m (36 ft)

Languages
  - Official: Marathi,
- Time zone: UTC+5:30 (IST)
- PIN: 400 001
- Lok Sabha constituency: Mumbai South
- Civic agency: BMC

Fort is a business and art Subdistrict in the city of Mumbai, Maharashtra, India. The area gets its name after the erstwhile defensive fort, Bombay Fort and its annexe Fort George, built by the British East India Company around Bombay Castle.

The area extends from the docks in the east, to Azad Maidan in the west; Chhatrapati Shivaji Maharaj Terminus in the north to Kala Ghoda in the south. This area is the heart of the financial markets of the city & multiple British era structures are located in this neighbourhood.

== History ==
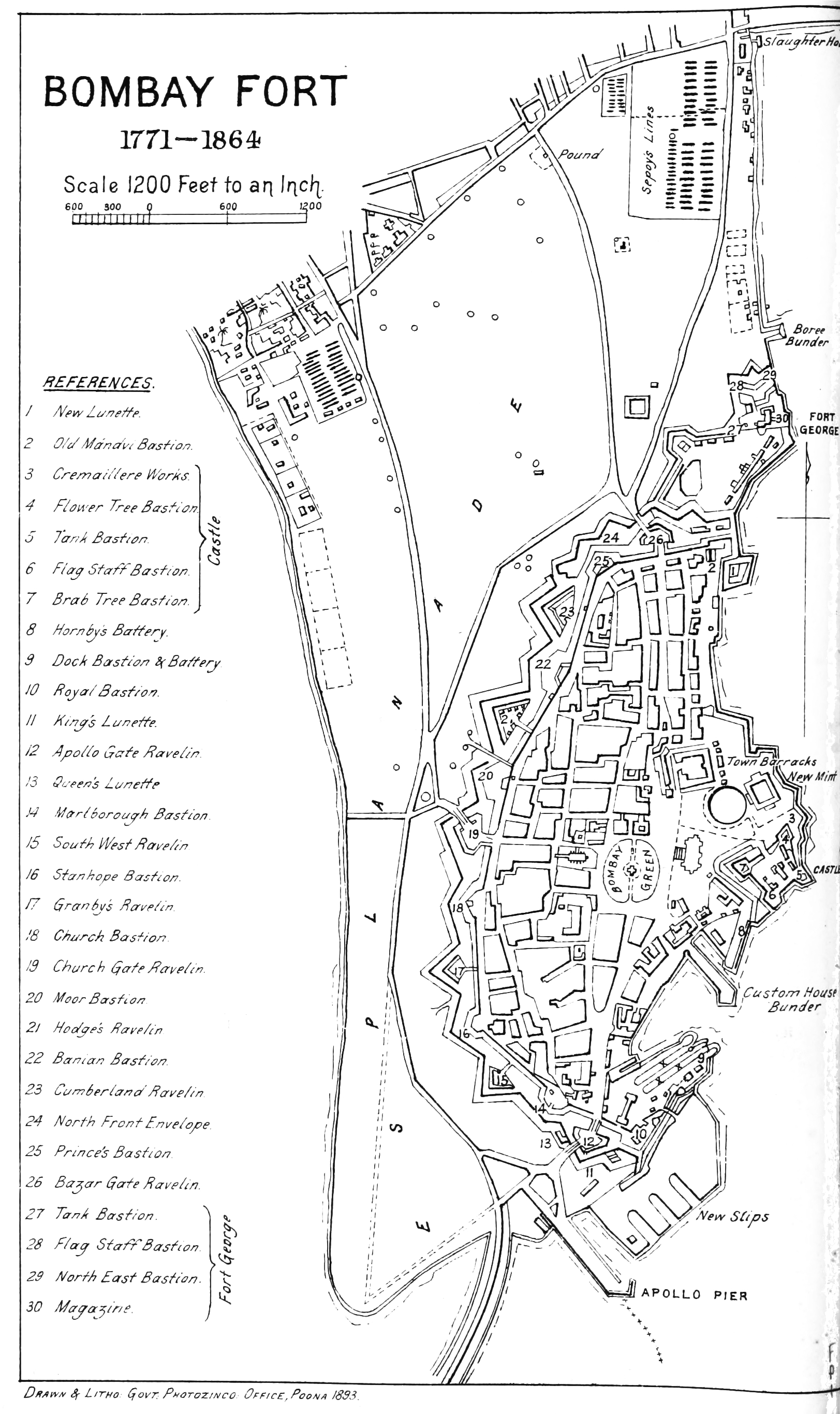
Map of Bombay Fort, 1771

The Fort area was declared protected under regulations of the Maharashtra Government Urban Development Department. An advisory committee now oversees the development, repairs and renovations of structures in the precinct. In 1882, Bomanjee Hormarjee Wadia Clock Tower was erected using public funds as a token of appreciation for Bomanjee Hormarjee, a Parsi philanthropist who made contributions towards improving education in Bombay. The Fort neighbourhood of Mumbai was the first part to be developed by the British. Then, over the years it stood as a reminder of India's colonial history, and today it is sort of a jewel in the crown of the city's cultural scene.

It had been listed as a notorious market in 2009 and 2010 by the USTR for selling counterfeit software, media and goods.

== See also ==
- Nariman Point
- Colaba
- Bandra Kurla Complex
- Marine Lines
- Grant Road

== See also ==
- List of forts in Maharashtra
