= Chronology of statehood of Maharashtra =

Jan 28, 1940: The Samyukta Mahasabha organization is formed in Bombay (now Mumbai) to pursue the resolution passed at the literary meet.

1940-45: The demand of Maharashtra was postponed due to World War and Quit India Movement.

May 12, 1946: A resolution of Samyukta Maharashtra (Unified Maharashtra) is passed at the literary meet in Belgaum, which is presided over by Gajanan Tryambak Madkholkar. A committee comprising GT Madkholkar, DV Potdar, Shankarrao Deo, Keshavrao Jedhe and SS Navre is constituted to implement the resolution.

Jul 28, 1946: The committee holds a conference, Maharashtra Ekikaran Parishad, in Bombay, organized by SK Patil and presided over by Shankarrao Deo. Around 200 delegates from Maharashtra: Bombay State, Vidharbha and Marathwada are present for the conference and resolution of Samyukta Maharashtra is passed after Acarya Dada Dharmadhikari's proposal.

Dec 1946: People supporting the formation of state on linguistic lines hold a meeting in New Delhi under leadership of Pattabhi Sitaramayya.

April 13, 1947: The Akola pact is finalized between Shankarrao Deo and Madhav Aney. It is decided that the Maharashtra Ekikaran Parishad will work on formation of Samyukta Maharashtra including Western Maharashtra (Bombay Province) and C.P and Berar Province commonly styled as Maha-Vidarbha.

Jun 17, 1948: The Union government appoints a commission to be headed by the president of the constitutional council, SK Dhar, to study the formation of Maharashtra, Andhra, Karnataka and Kerala.

Dec 10, 1948: The Dhar commission submits its report opposing the formation of states on linguistic lines, saying that such move will be against national interest.

Dec 1948: The Congress accepts the principle of the formation of the states on linguistic lines at its Jaipur conclave. A committee comprising Pattabhi Sitaramayya, Jawaharlal Nehru and Vallabhbhai Patel is formed to reconsider this issue.

Oct 1953: The State of Andhra is formed.

Nov 4, 1953: Shankarrao Deo writes Nehru and demands formation of Samyukta Maharashtra.

Dec 29, 1953: Union government constitutes the State Reformation Board under Fazal Ali.

Aug 1954: Fazal Ali files report after touring Nagpur, Chanda, Akola, Amravati, Pune and then Bombay

Oct 10, 1955: Fazal Ali's report is made public. The report suggests formation of two states, Bombay and Vidharbha. Ali proposes Bombay with two divisions – Gujarat, including Kutch and Saurashtra, and Maharashtra, including Marathwada. However, the Samyukta Maharashtra Parishad opposes this proposal.

Oct 19, 1955: Nehru suggests formation of three states: Samyukta Maharashtra, including Vidharba and Marathwada; Maha Gujarat, including Kutch and Saurashtra and Bombay. However, Shankarrao Deo and Dhananjay Gadgil suggest two states: Samyukta Maharashtra, including Vidharbha, Marathwada and Bombay, and Maha Gujarat, including Kutch and Saurashtra.

Nov 8, 1955: Congress working committee accepts Nehru's tri-state formula.

Nov 18, 1955: The Left parties observe the strike in Bombay.

Nov 20, 1955: Morarji Desai and SK Patil hold rally at Girgaum Chowpatty challenging the supporters of Samyukta Maharashtra.

Nov 21, 1955: The Left parties take a morcha (procession) to the state legislature, which the police try to stop. 106 people were shot by security forces during the period of agitation and at different places as the police open fire on the morcha at Flora fountain (now known as Hutatma chowk) after some people throw stones. Chimanlal Sheth, a reporter from the Gujarati daily Janmabhoomi, is killed while covering the morcha.

Nov 1955: Non-Congress political parties form the Samyukta Maharashtra Samiti in Pune.

Dec 1, 1955: Yashwantrao Chavan states that if he has to make a choice between Samyukta Maharashtra and Nehru, he will choose Nehru.

Jan 16, 1956: Violent agitations follow Nehru’s announcement of making Bombay a union territory.

Jan 22, 1956: Union minister CD Deshmukh resigns from the Nehru’s cabinet and alleges that Nehru nurtures ill-will towards Maharashtra.

Jun 3, 1956: Nehru declares Bombay a Union territory for five years, but refuses to make the city capital of Maharashtra. He announces a high court and a public service commission for Bombay, Maharashtra and Gujarat.

Aug 10, 1956: Lok Sabha passes a resolution for bigger bilingual state of Bombay. The state includes: Samayukta Maharashtra, including Bombay; and Maha Gujarat including Kutch and Saurashtra.

Aug 31, 1956: Marathi majority taluks transferred to Adilabad, Medak, Nizamabad and Mahaboobnagar districts of new Telugu State (now Telangana) and Karnataka in 1956. Even today, the old town names of all these regions are Marathi names.

Transferred to Telangana (1) Alampur and Gadwal taluks of Raichur district and Kodangal taluk of Gulbarga district; (2) Tandur taluk of Gulbarga district; (3) Zahirabad taluk (except Nirna circle), Nyalkal circle of Bidar taluk and Narayankhed taluk of Bidar district; (4) Bichkonda and Jukkal circles of Deglur taluk of Nanded district; and (5) Mudhol, Bhiansa and Kuber circles of Mudhol taluk of Nanded district; and (6) Adilabad district except Islapur circle of Boath taluk, Kinwat taluk and Rajura taluk; and thereupon the said territories shall cease to form part of the existing State of Hyderabad.

Transferred to Karnataka (1) Belgaum District (Marathi Majority) (2) Bijapur District (Marathi Majority) (3) Gulbarga District (Marathi Majority) (4) Bidar District (Marathi Majority) (5) Dharwar District (Marathi/Kannada) (6) Bagalkot District (Marathi/Kannada) (7) Raichur District (Marathi/Kannada)

Nov 1956: Samayukta Maharashtra Samiti starts satyagraha

Mar 28, 1960: Proposal of division of bigger bilingual state of Bombay is put up in Lok sabha.

April 21, 1960: Lok sabha gives its approval for a divided bigger bilingual state of Bombay.

May 1, 1960: Maharashtra is formed with Bombay as its capital.

1999–Present: 40 years old dispute of Telangana state's claim over several villages in Chandrapur district comes back to limelight. The Telangana High Court declared these villages to be part of their state. In response, the Maharashtra government had moved it to the Supreme Court, where its appeal is still pending. 14 villages in Jiwati taluk, 12 villages in Rajura taluk and 5 villages in Antapur of Chandrapur district are disputed with Telangana State. They are revenue villages of Marazoda, Anarpally, Lakampur, Ananthapur, Esagaon, Bolapathar, Gouri (D), Parandoli, Paraswada, Arkepally (D), Karanjiwada, Kota, Mukadamguda, Maharajguda, Lendijala, Lendiguda, Indiranagar, Yesapur, Narayanguda, Shankarloddi, Padmavathi and Janakpur, etc. sharing border with Adilabad District of Telangana, which has laid claim on these areas. The encroachment by Telangana is much attributed to its two humungous projects Pranahita Chevella lift irrigation scheme and Icchampally project which are seen to drain-out the water, land, people and agricultural resources of Vidarbha region.

The ongoing Telangana State Irrigation project Pranahita Chevella lift irrigation scheme which is a project not in the interest of Maharashtra. Maharashtra will be losing about 2123.4 hectares of land (which is severely under reported by print media at 1500 Ha or even less).

The Telangana State Irrigation project Icchampally Project which is a project not in the interest of Maharashtra. Maharashtra will be losing 33,614 hectares of land which is more than 100 villages.

2011–present: Disputes between Belgaum's Marathi-speaking leadership and the Karnataka government became frequent. Matters came to a head in mid-2012, when the Karnataka government actually superseded the Belgaum City Municipal Corporation. The Maharashtra Legislature unanimously passed a resolution against the move and demanded that Belgaum and the surrounding area embroiled in a border dispute be placed under the rule of the Centre until resolution of the dispute in the Supreme Court. Only in late 2011, the Belgaum civic body was dismissed along with its Marathi-speaking mayor and deputy mayor. From the 1960s, when the border dispute began, until 2015 the Maharashtra legislature passed at least 18 resolutions against the Karnataka government, calling its actions to crack down upon Marathi-speaking institutes and people in Belgaum illegal and unjust.
