= Morarji Desai =

Prime Minister of India from 1977 to 1979

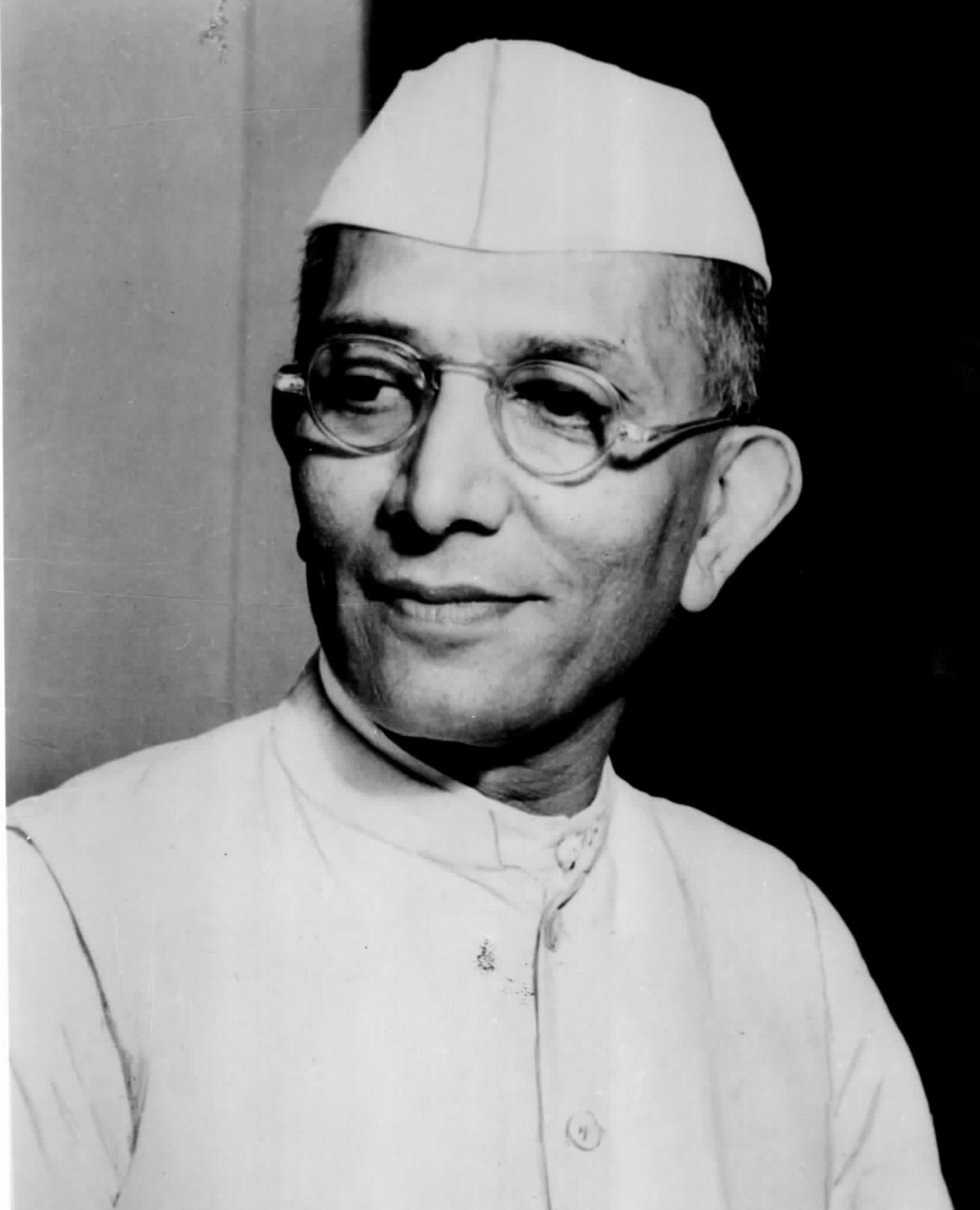
- Desai c. 1978

Prime Minister of India
- In office 24 March 1977 – 28 July 1979
- President: B. D. Jatti (interim); Neelam Sanjiva Reddy
- Vice President: B. D. Jatti
- Deputy: Charan Singh (24 January 1979 to 16 July 1979); Jagjivan Ram; (from 24 January 1979)
- Preceded by: Indira Gandhi
- Succeeded by: Charan Singh

Deputy Prime Minister of India
- In office 13 March 1967 – 16 July 1969
- Prime Minister: Indira Gandhi
- Preceded by: Vallabhbhai Patel
- Succeeded by: Charan Singh; Jagjivan Ram

Union Minister of Home Affairs
- In office 1 July 1978 – 24 January 1979
- Prime Minister: Himself
- Preceded by: Charan Singh
- Succeeded by: Hirubhai M. Patel

Union Minister of Finance
- In office 16 July 1979 – 28 July 1979
- Prime Minister: Himself
- Preceded by: Charan Singh
- Succeeded by: Hemwati Nandan Bahuguna
- In office 24 March 1977 – 26 March 1977
- Prime Minister: Himself
- Preceded by: Chidambaram Subramaniam
- Succeeded by: Hirubhai M. Patel
- In office 13 March 1967 – 16 July 1969
- Prime Minister: Indira Gandhi
- Preceded by: Sachindra Chaudhuri
- Succeeded by: Indira Gandhi
- In office 13 March 1958 – 29 August 1963
- Prime Minister: Jawaharlal Nehru
- Preceded by: T. T. Krishnamachari
- Succeeded by: T. T. Krishnamachari

Chief Minister of Bombay State
- In office 21 April 1952 – 31 October 1956
- Preceded by: B. G. Kher
- Succeeded by: Yashwantrao Chavan

Member of Parliament, Lok Sabha
- In office 1957 – 1980
- Constituency: Surat, Gujarat

Personal details
- Born: Morarji Ranchhodji Desai; 29 February 1896 Bhadeli, Bombay Presidency, British India (present-day Valsad, Gujarat, India)
- Died: 10 April 1995 (aged 99) Bombay, Maharashtra, India (present-day Mumbai)
- Party: Janata Party (1977-1988)
- Other political affiliations: Indian National Congress (1934–1969); Indian National Congress (Organisation) (1969–1977); Janata Dal (1988–1995)
- Spouse: Gujraben Desai (m. 1911; died 1981)
- Children: 5
- Education: University of Mumbai
- Profession: Activist; politician
- Awards: Nishan-e-Pakistan; Bharat Ratna

Morarji Ranchhodji Desai (29 February 1896 – 10 April 1995) was an Indian politician and independence activist who served as the prime minister of India between 1977 and 1979 leading the government formed by the Janata Party. During his long career in politics, he held many important posts in government such as the chief minister of Bombay State, the home minister, the finance minister, and the deputy prime minister.

Following the death of Prime Minister Lal Bahadur Shastri, Desai was a strong contender for the position of Prime Minister, only to be defeated by Indira Gandhi in 1966. He was appointed as Minister of Finance and Deputy Prime Minister in Indira Gandhi's cabinet, until 1969. When Indian National Congress split in 1969 he became a part of the INC (O). After the controversial emergency was lifted in 1977, the political parties of the opposition fought together against the INC (I), under the umbrella of the Janata Party, and won the 1977 election. Desai was elected prime minister, and became the first non-Congress prime minister of India. Desai was the second and the last prime minister to have been born in the nineteenth century.

Desai was known for his pro-American stance and called out for his collusion with the American intelligence agency CIA. He unsuccessfully sued a journalist for it. He was also known for his peace activism and created efforts to initiate peace between India and rival Pakistan. After India's first nuclear test in 1974, Desai helped restore friendly relations with China and Pakistan, and vowed to avoid armed conflict such as the Indo-Pakistani war of 1971. He was honoured with the highest civilian award of Pakistan, the Nishan-e-Pakistan on 19 May 1990.

He is the oldest person to hold the office of prime minister in the history of Indian politics, at the age of 81. He was also the first former deputy prime minister to occupy the primary post. He subsequently retired from all political posts, but continued to campaign for the Janata Party in 1980. He was conferred with India's highest civilian honour, the Bharat Ratna. He died at the age of 99 in 1995.

== Early life ==
=== Birth ===
Morarji Desai was born in British ruled India on February 1896 into a well-to-do Gujarati Anavil Brahmin family. His father's name was Ranchhodji Nagarji Desai and his mother's name was Vajiaben Desai. He was born in Bhadeli village, Bulsar district, Bombay Presidency, British India (present-day Valsad district, Gujarat, India) on 29 February 1896, the eldest of eight children. His father was a school teacher.

=== School education and early career ===
Desai underwent his primary schooling in The Kundla School (now called J.V. Modi school), Savarkundla and later joined Bai Ava Bai High School, Valsad. Desai resigned as deputy collector of Godhra in May 1930 after being found guilty of going soft on Hindus during the riots of 1927–28 there.

=== Freedom fighter ===
Desai then joined the freedom struggle under Mahatma Gandhi and joined the civil disobedience movement against British rule in India. He spent many years in jail during the freedom struggle and owing to his sharp leadership skills and tough spirit, he became a favourite among freedom-fighters and an important leader of the Indian National Congress in the Gujarat region. When provincial elections were held in 1934 and 1937, Desai was elected and served as the Revenue Minister and Home Minister of the Bombay Presidency.

== In government ==
=== Chief Minister of Bombay and Partition into two state ===
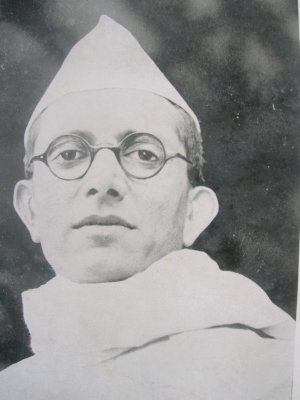
Desai in 1937, as Congress Home Minister of Bombay Presidency

Before the independence of India, Desai became Bombay's Home Minister and was later elected Chief Minister of Bombay state in 1952. It was a period when movements for linguistic states were on the rise, particularly in South India. Bombay was a bi-lingual state, home to Gujarati-speaking and Marathi-speaking people. Since 1956, activist organisation Samyukta Maharashtra Samiti led a movement for a Marathi-speaking state of Maharashtra. Desai was opposed to such movements, including the Mahagujarat Movement led by Indulal Yagnik demanding a new state of Gujarat. Desai proposed that the metropolitan Mumbai be made a Union territory. His logic was that a separate development region would suit the city's cosmopolitan nature, with citizens from diverse settings across various linguistic, cultural, and religious backgrounds living there for generations. The movement led to violence across the city and state, and Desai ordered the police to open fire on the Samyukta Maharashtra Samiti demonstrators who had gathered at Flora Fountain. The protesters were led by Senapati Bapat. In the carnage that followed, 105 protesters were killed. The issue escalated and is believed to have forced the Central Government to agree to two separate states based on language. After the formation of the present State of Maharashtra, Bombay, now Mumbai, became its state capital. Flora Fountain was renamed "Hutatma Chowk" ("Martyrs' Square" in English) to honour the people killed in the firing. Later Desai moved to Delhi when he was inducted as finance Minister in the cabinet of Prime Minister Jawaharlal Nehru.

=== Nehru cabinet ===
Desai was socially conservative, pro-business, and in favour of free enterprise reforms, as opposed to Prime Minister Jawaharlal Nehru's socialistic policies.

Rising in Congress leadership, as a fierce nationalist with anti-corruption leanings, Desai was at odds with Prime Minister Nehru and his allies, and with Nehru's age and health failing, he was considered as a possible contender for the position of Prime Minister.

=== Congress party leadership contest ===
After Nehru's death in 1964, Desai was outflanked in the leadership contest by Nehru's protege, Lal Bahadur Shastri. Shastri invited Desai to join his short-lived cabinet, but Desai did not join. In early 1966, Shastri passed away suddenly after only 18 months in power, and Desai again became a contender for the top position. However, he was defeated by Nehru's daughter, Indira Gandhi, in the Congress party leadership election by a big margin.

=== Indira Gandhi cabinet ===
Desai served as deputy prime minister and Finance Minister in the Indira Gandhi government until July 1969, when Gandhi took over the finance portfolio but asked Desai to stay on as deputy prime minister. However, to save his self-respect, Desai tendered his resignation from the Gandhi cabinet. Gandhi also nationalised the fourteen largest banks in India at the same time. There was some difference of opinion between Gandhi and Desai related to Congress candidate for Presidency in India.

=== In opposition ===
When the Congress Party split in 1969, Desai joined the Indian National Congress (Organisation) faction of the party, whereas Gandhi formed a new faction called Indian National Congress (Requisitionists). Alternatively, the two factions of Desai and Gandhi were called Syndicate and Indicate respectively. Gandhi's faction won the 1971 general elections in a landslide. Desai, however, was elected as a member of the Lok Sabha. Desai went on indefinite hunger strike on 12 March 1975 to support Nav Nirman movement of Gujarat.

In 1975, Gandhi was convicted of electoral fraud by the Allahabad High Court, after opponents alleged she had used government civil servants and equipment during the campaign for the 1971 general elections. During the subsequent Emergency rule in 1975–77, Desai and other opposition leaders were jailed by the Gandhi government as part of a massive crackdown.

=== Janata wave of 1977 ===
The popular anti-corruption movement led by Jayaprakash Narayan and the Janata-wave in 1977 led to the complete routing of the Congress party in Northern India, and a landslide victory for the opposition Janata alliance in the National elections held in March 1977. Desai was selected by the Janata alliance, later Janata Party as their parliamentary leader, and thus became the first non-Congress Prime Minister of India.

== Prime Minister of India (1977–1979) ==
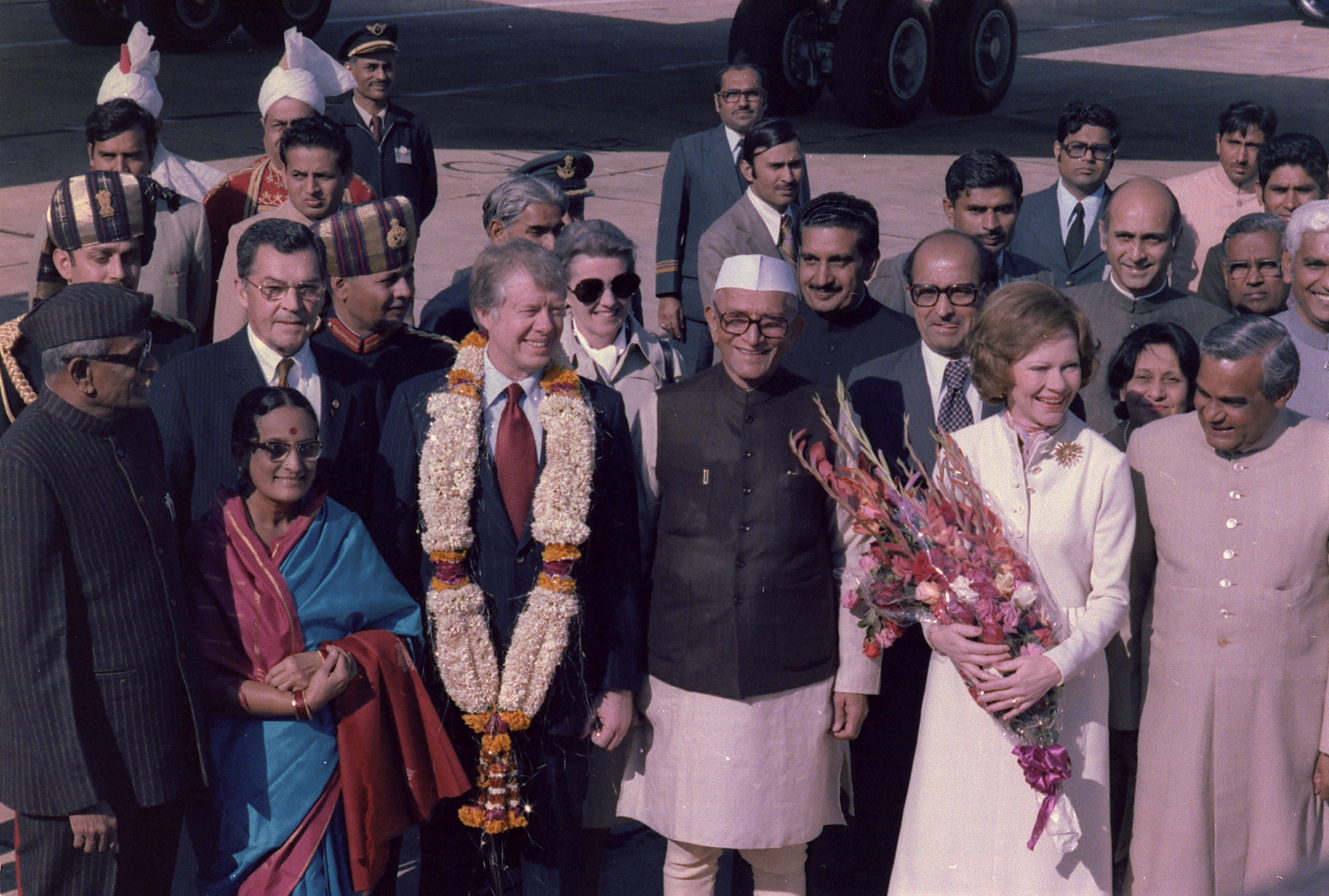
Desai (third from right, front row) with the US President Jimmy Carter during his January 1978 visit to India.

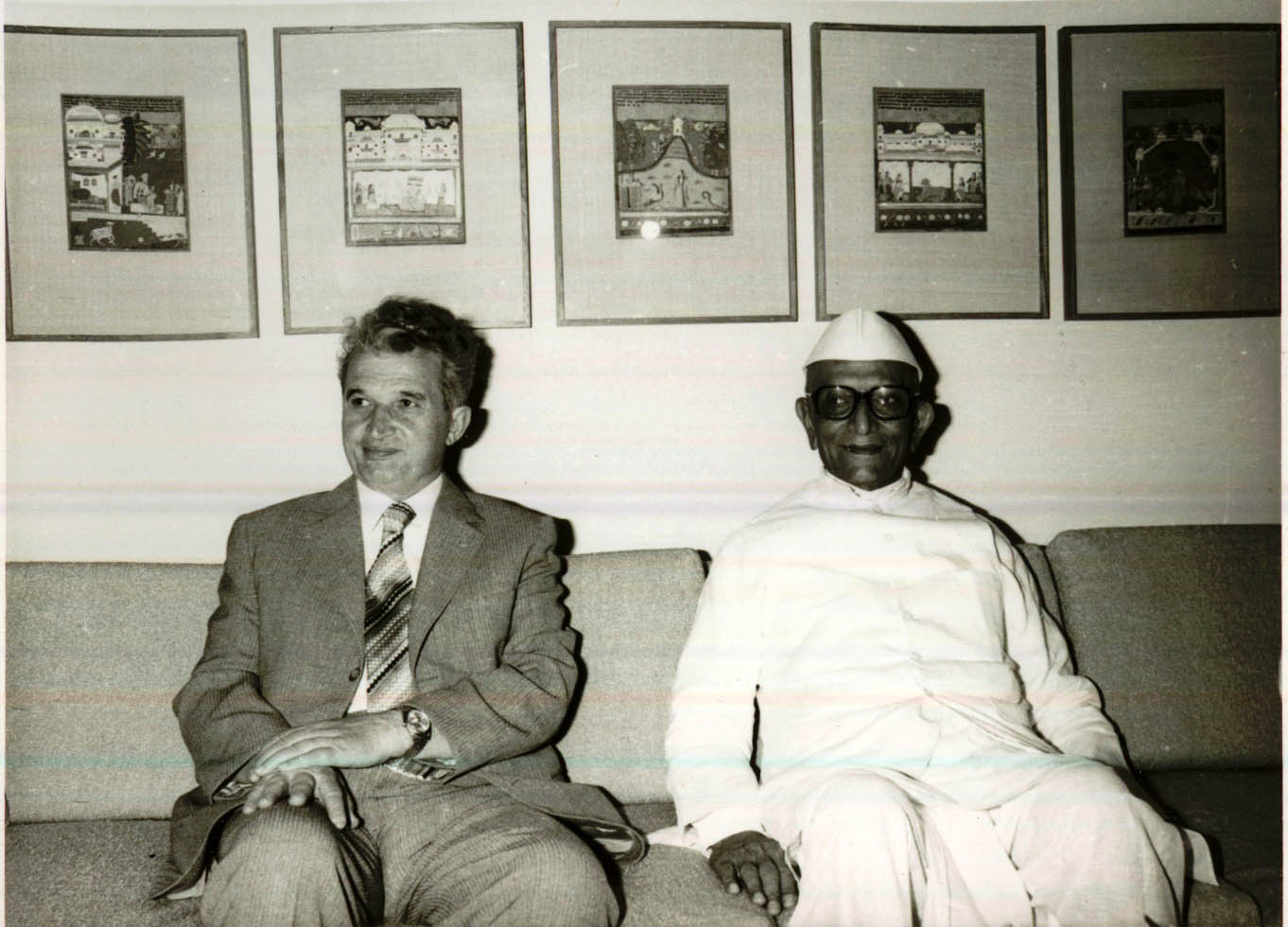
Desai with the Romanian President Nicolae Ceauşescu in Delhi in May 1978.

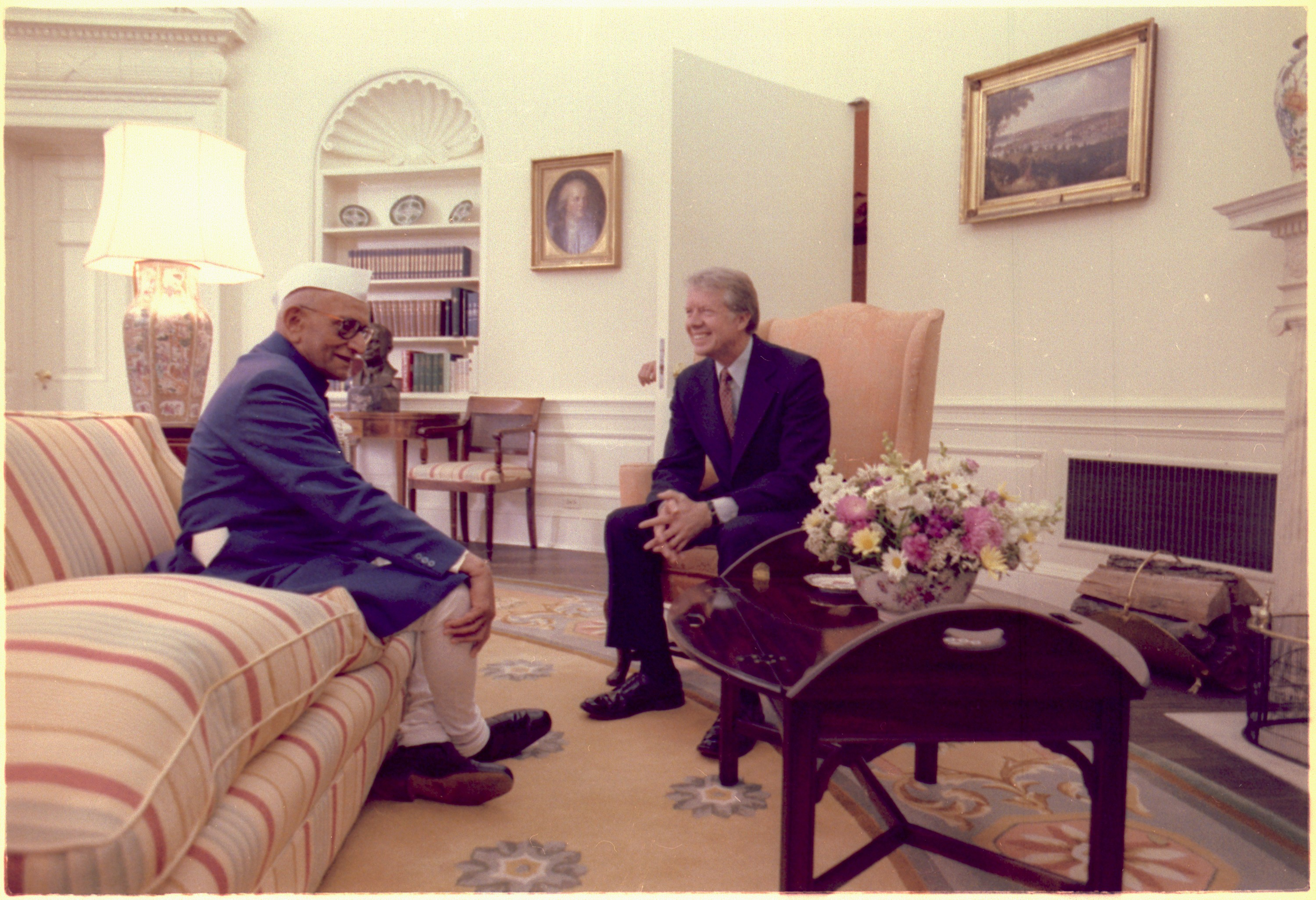
Desai and Carter in the Oval Office in June 1978.

In January 1977, Indira Gandhi advised the President dissolve the Lok Sabha, which he did, and Gandhi declared that elections to the body were to be held during March 1977. Opposition leaders were also released and promptly formed the Janata alliance to fight the elections. The alliance registered a landslide victory in the election. On the urging of Jayaprakash Narayan, the Janata alliance selected Desai as their parliamentary leader and thus the Prime Minister. He is the first indian former chief minister to become Prime Minister of Country.

=== Foreign policy ===
Desai restored normal relations with China, for the first time since the 1962 war. He also communicated with the military ruler of Pakistan, General Zia-ul-Haq and established friendly relations. Despite his pacifist leanings, he refused to sign the nuclear non-proliferation treaty despite the threat of stopping supply of uranium for power plants by the USA Congress.

Noted for his pro-American stance, throughout his tenure, he had been called a CIA agent. American journalist Seymour Hersh, Congress leader Sanjay Gandhi and others further accused Desai of colluding with the United States. Hersh revealed that Desai was paid $20,000 per year for exposing the secrets of Indian politics to the United States, including about the 1971 India Pakistan war. Desai sued Hersh in the US over these allegations, however, the lawsuit was rejected by the American court.

=== Nuclear programme ===
Domestically, Desai played a crucial role in the Indian nuclear program after it was targeted by major nuclear powers after India conducted a surprise nuclear test in 1974. Desai kept India's nuclear reactors stating "they will never be used for atomic bombs, and I will see to it if I can help it". Internationally, he reaffirmed India's stand that it would not manufacture nuclear weapons and would refrain from conducting even peaceful nuclear explosions. In 1977, the Carter administration offered to sell heavy water and uranium to India for its nuclear reactors but required American on-site inspection of nuclear materials. Desai declined, seeing the American stance as contradictory, in light of its own nuclear arsenal.

=== Decimation of R&AW ===
Desai had described the Research and Analysis Wing (R&AW), India's external intelligence agency, as the praetorian guard of Indira Gandhi and had promised to stop all activities of the R&AW after becoming prime minister. He closed down much of the agency, and reduced its budget and operations, such as closing its Information Division. B. Raman, the former head of the Counter-Terrorism Division of R&AW and noted security analyst, revealed that in an informal discussion, Desai indiscreetly told Pakistan's Chief Martial Law Administrator General Zia ul-Haq that his government was well aware of Pakistan's nuclear development.

=== Intra-party squabbles and collapse of Janata government ===
His government undid many amendments made to the constitution during emergency and made it more difficult for any future government to impose a national emergency. However, the Janata Party coalition was full of personal and policy friction and thus failed to achieve much, owing to continuous in-wrangling and much controversy. With no party in leadership of the coalition, rival groups vied to unseat Desai. Controversial trials of prominent Congress leaders, including Indira Gandhi over Emergency-era abuses worsened the fortunes of his administration. In 1979, Raj Narain and Charan Singh pulled out of the Janata Party, forcing Desai to resign from office and retire from politics. The chief reason for the collapse was the demand by the duo and other left-leaning members, like Madhu Limaye, Krishan Kant, and George Fernandes that no member of the Janata party could simultaneously be a member of an alternative social or political organisation. This attack on "dual membership" was directed specifically at members of the Janata Party who had been members of the Jan Sangh, and continued to be members of Rashtriya Swayamsevak Sangh, the Jan Sangh's ideological parent.

== Retirement and death ==
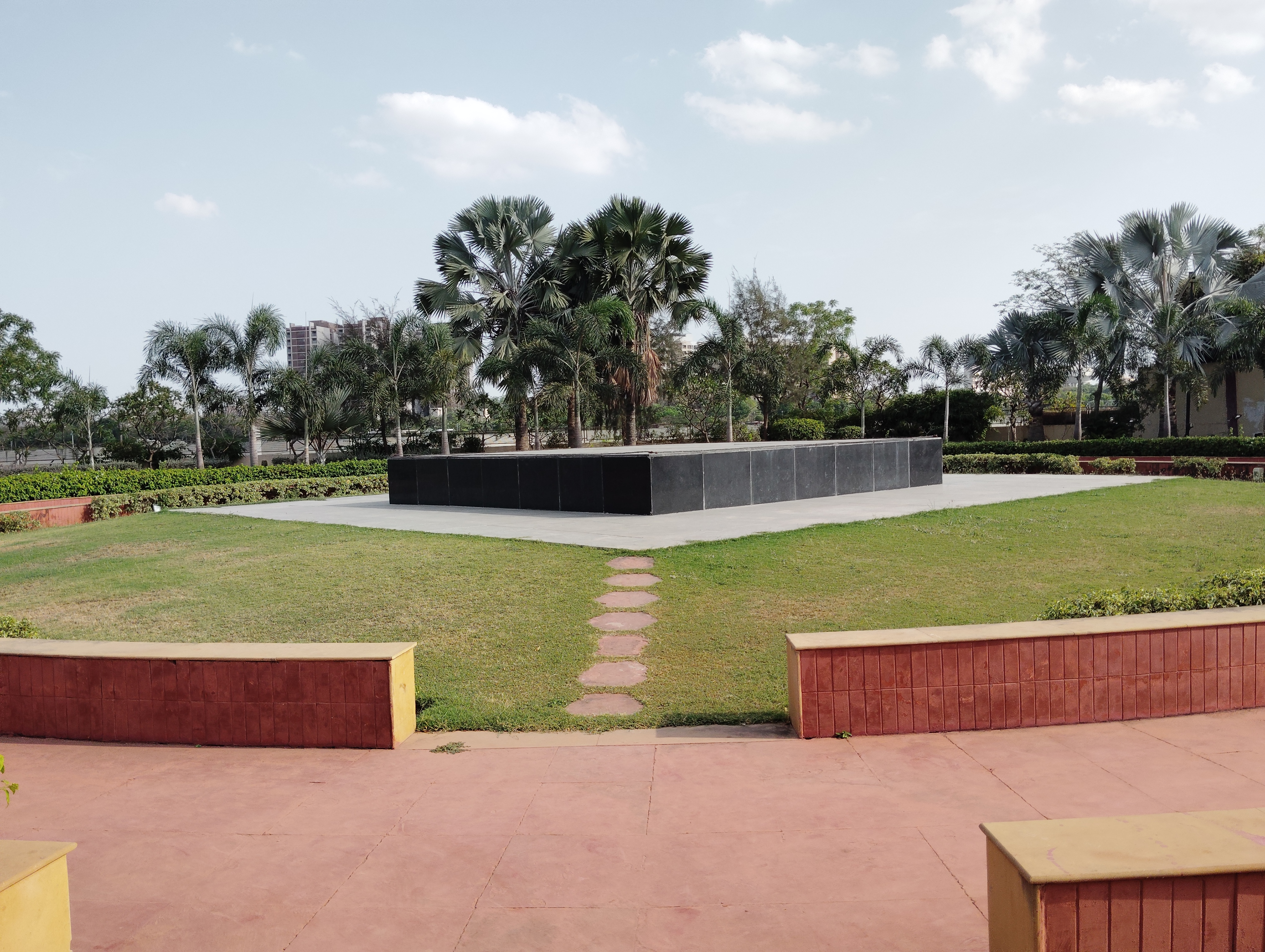
The platform in Abhay Ghat, a memorial park near Sabarmati Ashram, where Morarji Desai was cremated

Desai campaigned for the Janata Party in 1980 General Election as a senior politician but did not contest the election himself. In retirement, he lived in Mumbai. When former French Prime Minister Antoine Pinay died on 13 December 1994, Desai became the world's oldest living former head of government. He was much honoured in his last years as a freedom-fighter of his generation. On his 99th birthday, he was visited by Prime Minister P. V. Narasimha Rao, and soon after began to fall ill. He was treated in a hospital in Mumbai due to low blood pressure and a chest infection. He died on 10 April 1995, aged 99, after he underwent surgery for a blood clot in his brain.

Desai was a moralist. He was a vegetarian "both by birth and by conviction."

== Social service ==
Desai was a Gandhian follower, social worker, institution builder and a great reformer. He was the chancellor of Gujarat Vidyapith. Even during his term as the prime minister he used to visit and stay at Vidyapith during the month of October. He lived simply and used to write postcards himself even when he held the office of Prime Minister. Sardar Patel deputed him to conduct meetings of farmers in Kaira district which finally led to the establishment of the Amul Cooperative movement. During his rule, he withdrew intervention in Public Distribution System and rationing shops were literally lost due to cheap sugar and oil available in the market.

== Personal life ==
Desai married Gujraben in 1911, at the age of 15. Gujraben lived to see her husband become prime minister. She died on 25 October 1981 at the age of 81. Out of his five children, only three survived infancy: his daughters Virumati and Indu and his son Kantilal.

Virumati, who was married to Ramanlal Desai, died in the early 2000s. Indu, a medical student, died by suicide in 1953. Kantilal Desai, who was married to Padma Kirloskar, died in 2014.

One of Desai's great-grandsons, Madhukeshwar Desai, grandson of Kantilal Desai, is the National Vice-President of the Bharatiya Janata Yuva Morcha, the youth wing of the BJP.

Desai's eldest great-grandson, Vishaal Desai, is a film director and editor known for his documentary on the renowned yoga guru B.K.S. Iyengar, titled Yogacharya B.K.S. Iyengar: Uniting Through Yoga.

Desai, a teetotaler and longtime practitioner of 'urine therapy', spoke in 1978 to Dan Rather on 60 Minutes about the benefits of drinking urine. He also attributed his longevity to drinking urine.

== Awards and honours ==
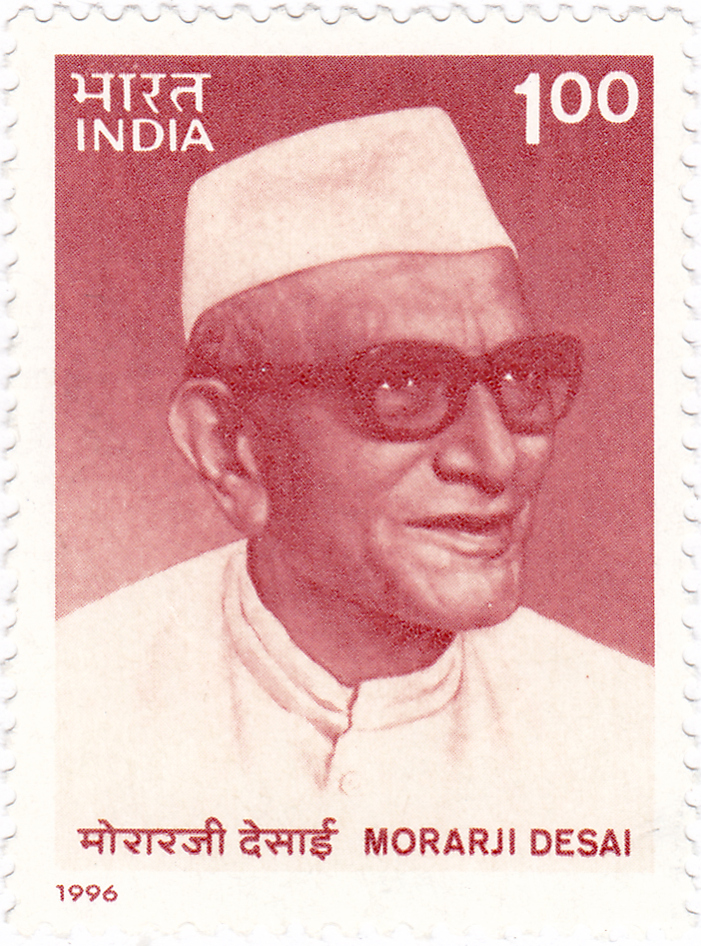
Desai on Indian Postal Stamp 1996

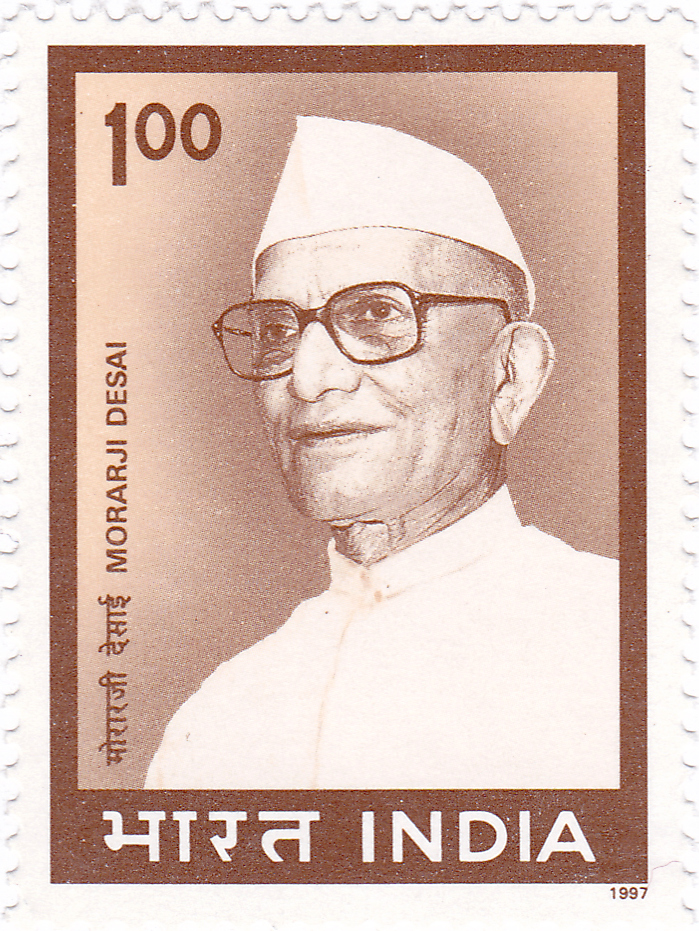
Desai on Indian Postal Stamp 1997

=== National honours ===
- India:
  - Bharat Ratna (1991)

=== Foreign honours ===
- Pakistan:
  - Nishan-e-Pakistan (19 May 1990)

== In popular culture ==
Morarji, an Indian television series about the life of Desai from his days as an independence activist till his tenure as prime minister, aired on the national public broadcaster Doordarshan's DD National channel. The Films Division of India made For Peace and Friendship, a 1978 short documentary film directed by C. Ramani about Desai's campaign for nuclear disarmament. Govind Namdeo appeared as Desai in the 2019 conspiracy thriller film The Gandhi Murder, by Karim Traïdia and Pankaj Sehgal, which explores a British abetment in the assassination of Mahatma Gandhi. Avijit Dutt appears as Desai in Mission Majnu.

Pradhanmantri (lit. 'Prime Minister'), a 2013 Indian docudrama television series which aired on ABP News and covers the various policies and political tenures of Indian PMs, dedicated the thirteenth episode – "Story of Morarji Desai and Janata Party" – to his term as the country's leader.

He was depicted in a 2024 Indian biographical film Main Atal Hoon. His character was played by Rajesh Khatri.

Political offices
Preceded by Jawaharlal Nehru	Minister of Finance; 1958–1963	Succeeded by Tiruvellore Thattai Krishnamachari
Preceded by Vallabhbhai Patel	Deputy Prime Minister of India; 1967–1969	Succeeded by Charan Singh
Preceded by Vallabhbhai Patel	Deputy Prime Minister of India; 1967–1969	Succeeded by Jagjivan Ram
Preceded by Sachindra Chaudhuri	Minister of Finance; 1967–1969	Succeeded by Indira Gandhi
Preceded by Indira Gandhi	Prime Minister of India; 1977–1979	Succeeded by Charan Singh
Preceded by Indira Gandhi	Chairperson of the Planning Commission; 1977–1979	Succeeded by Charan Singh
Preceded by Charan Singh	Minister of Home Affairs; 1978–1979	Succeeded by Hirubhai M. Patel
Preceded by B. G. Kher	Chief Minister of Bombay State; 1952–1957	Succeeded by Yashwantrao Chavan
Records
Preceded by Antoine Pinay	Oldest living state leader 13 December 1994 – 10 April 1995	Succeeded by Hastings Banda
