= Dadabhai Naoroji Road =

Road in South Mumbai, Maharashtra, India

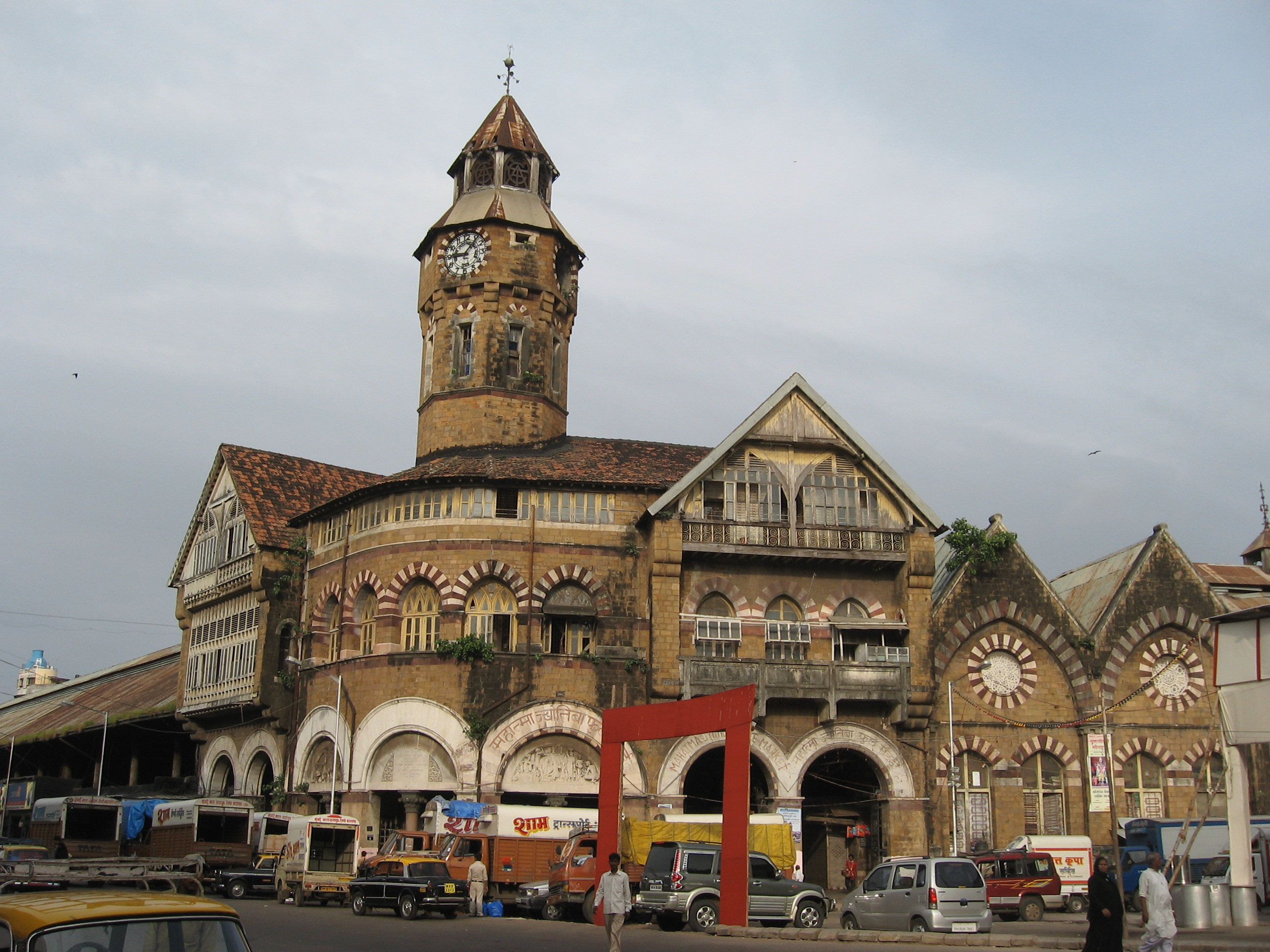
- Mahatma Phule Market.

- Location within Mumbai

General information
- Architectural style: Neo–Classical and Gothic Revival
- Location: Mumbai, India
- Coordinates: 18.9325°N 72.8317°E
- Construction started: 1885
- Completed: 1914
- Client: Maharashtra

Design and construction
- Architect: Sir Bartle Frere

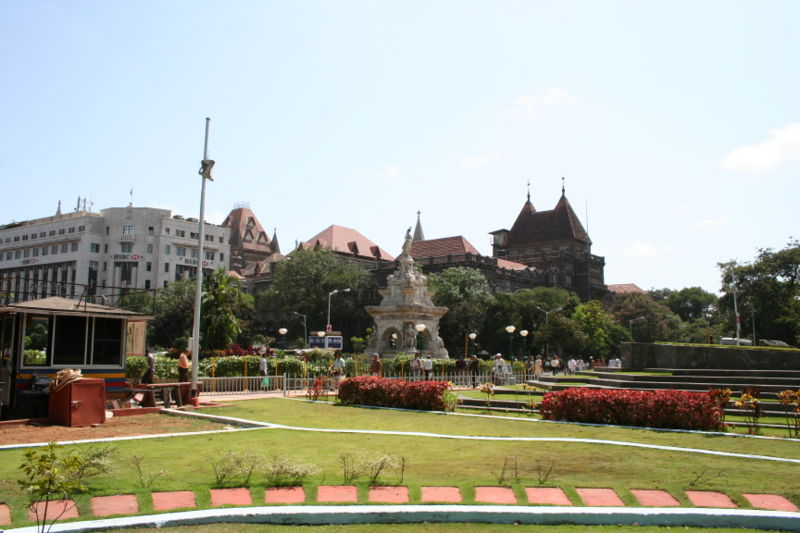
Picturesque view of Flora Fountain at Hutatma Chowk at South end of Dadabhai Naoroji Road

Dadabhai Naoroji Road (D.N.Road), a North–South commercial artery road, in the Fort business district in South Mumbai of Maharashtra, India, is the nerve centre of the city, starting from the Mahatma Phule Market (also known as Crawford Market), linking Chhatrapati Shivaji Maharaj Terminus, leads to the Hutatma Chowk at the southern end of the road. This entire stretch of the road is studded with Neo–Classical and Gothic Revival buildings and parks built in the 19th century, intermingled with modern office buildings and commercial establishments.

D.N.Road, a simple street within the Mumbai Fort, it was broadened into an avenue in the 1860s.

With the objective of protecting the 19th century streetscape, the Mumbai Metropolitan Regional Development Authority (MMRDA) launched a conservation project titled "Dadabhai Naoroji Road Heritage Streetscape Project" and implemented it successfully for which the MMRDA received the prestigious "UNESCO's Asia–Pacific Heritage Award of Merit", in the year 2004.

== History ==
The history of Dadabhai Naoroji Road could be chronicled to the time when it was a small street in the erstwhile old fort area, more than two hundred years back. The British East India Company built the Fort (Mumbai precinct) leisurely between 1686 and 1743 with three gates, a moat, esplanade, level open spaces on its western fringe (to control fires) and residences (remnant of the fort wall is pictured). The fort was demolished in the 1860s by the then Governor Sir Bartle Frere to provide adequate space for the growing civic requirements of the city and the area was substantially re–structured. The small Hornby Road was converted into a broad avenue, and on its western border large plots were laid and impressive buildings (built during the boom years 1885–1919) constructed in accordance with mandatory (government regulation of 1896) pedestrian arcade in the ground floor that performed as the unifying element tying together the various building facades. What ensued in the nineteenth century was thus a magnificent spectacle of Victorian neo–Gothic, Indo–Sarcenic, neo–classical and Edwardian structures linked together by a continuous ground floor pedestrian arcade along the streetscape.

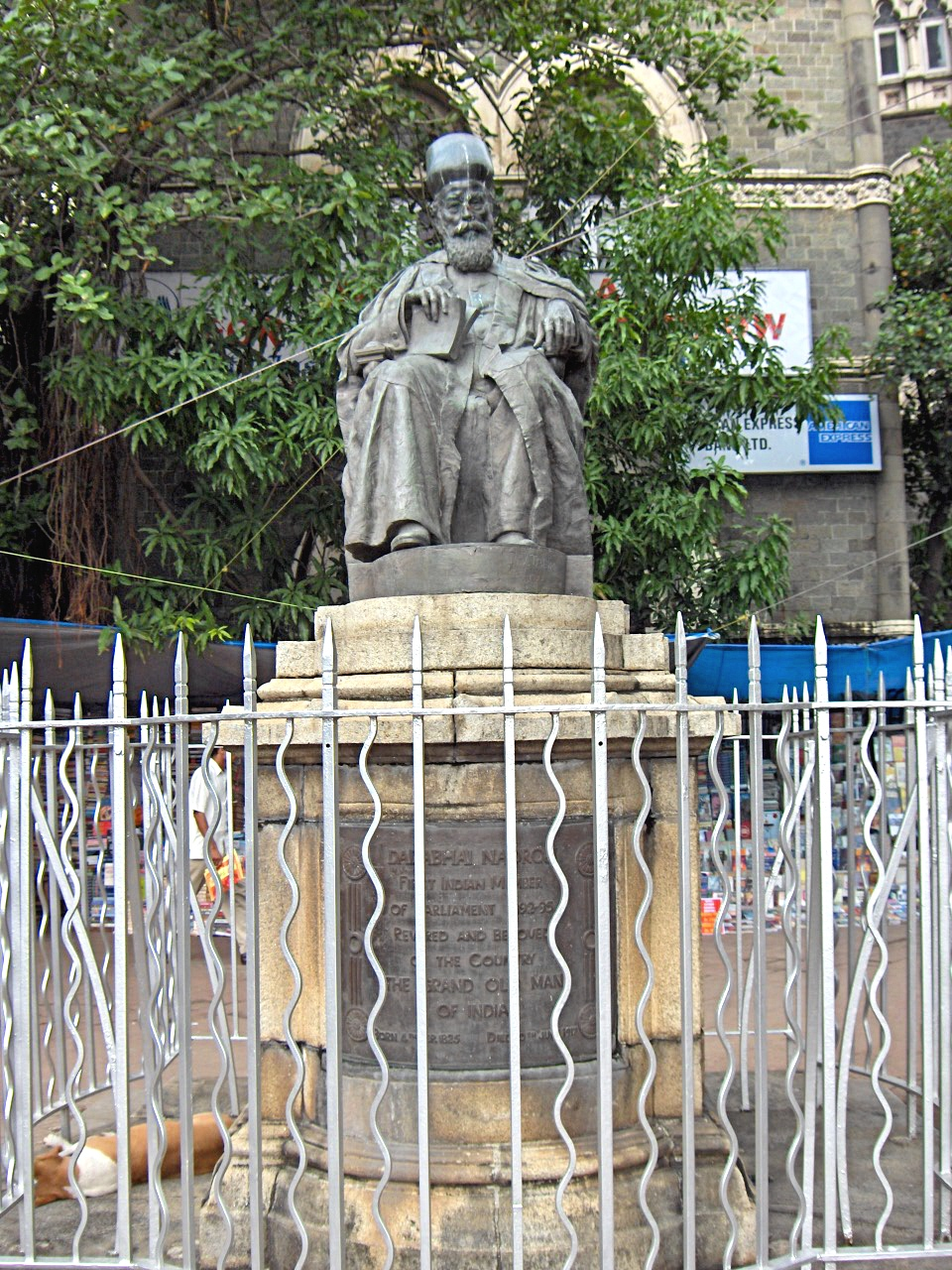
Marble Statue of Dadabhai Naoroji overlooks the Hutatma Chowk

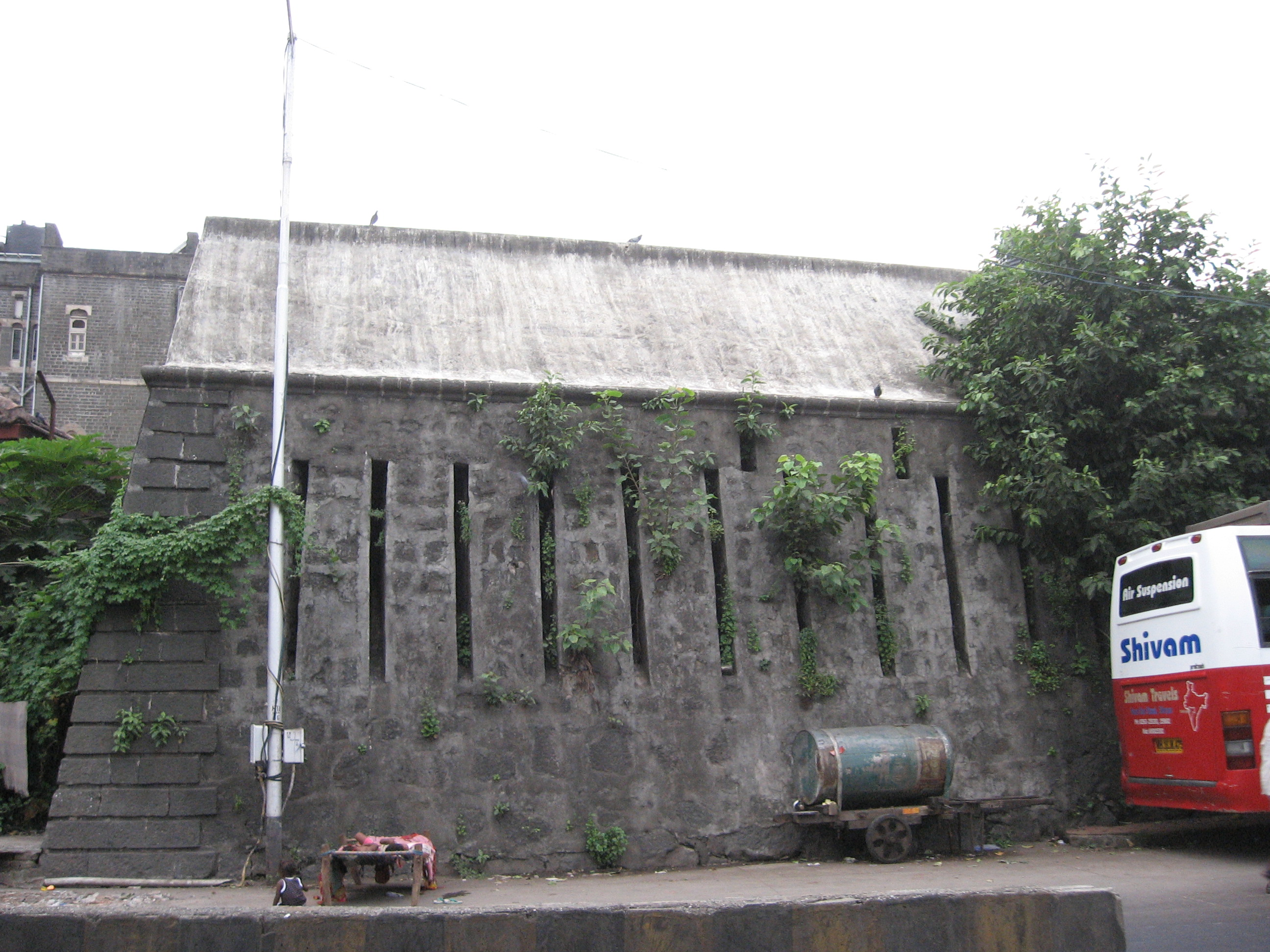
Remnant of the Old Fort wall

The eponymous Dadabhai Naoroji Road, the heritage road of Mumbai, is named after Dadabhai Naoroji (1825–1917), an Indian nationalist leader known as the "Grand Old man of India". He was an intellectual with high academic achievements. In 1892, he was the first Asian to become Member of the British Parliament. As the founder of the Indian National Congress and three times its party President, his most notable contribution was to publicly voice the demand for swaraj (Independence of India), in 1906. History books on India have recorded his achievements and contributions to India's freedom movement. Concerned by the economic consequences of the British rule in India, he propagated a theory that India's unfortunate economic condition and poverty then was the result of the British Colonial government ‘draining’ resources out of this country, a unilateral transfer of resources from India to Britain. He also expanded on this theory through lectures and wrote on "Poverty" and "Un–British Rule in India" (1901), which provoked and inspired economic nationalism in India. This theory, termed the "drain theory" caught the imagination of the people and became the rallying point for India's nationalist movement for independence.

His statue (made of black marble), bespectacled with a Parsi hat and with a book in one hand, overlooks the iconic Flora Fountain. It is stated that during his time one could get a panoramic view of the city all the way past the Taj Mahal Hotel into the waves of sea waters of Mumbai Harbour, before this part of Mumbai got overbuilt.

== Heritage buildings along the road ==
Apart from the Mahatma Phule Market at the northern end and the Hutatma Chowk with Dadabhai Naoroji's statue overlooking the fountain at its southern end, the "Mile Long" street displays the following famous heritage buildings:

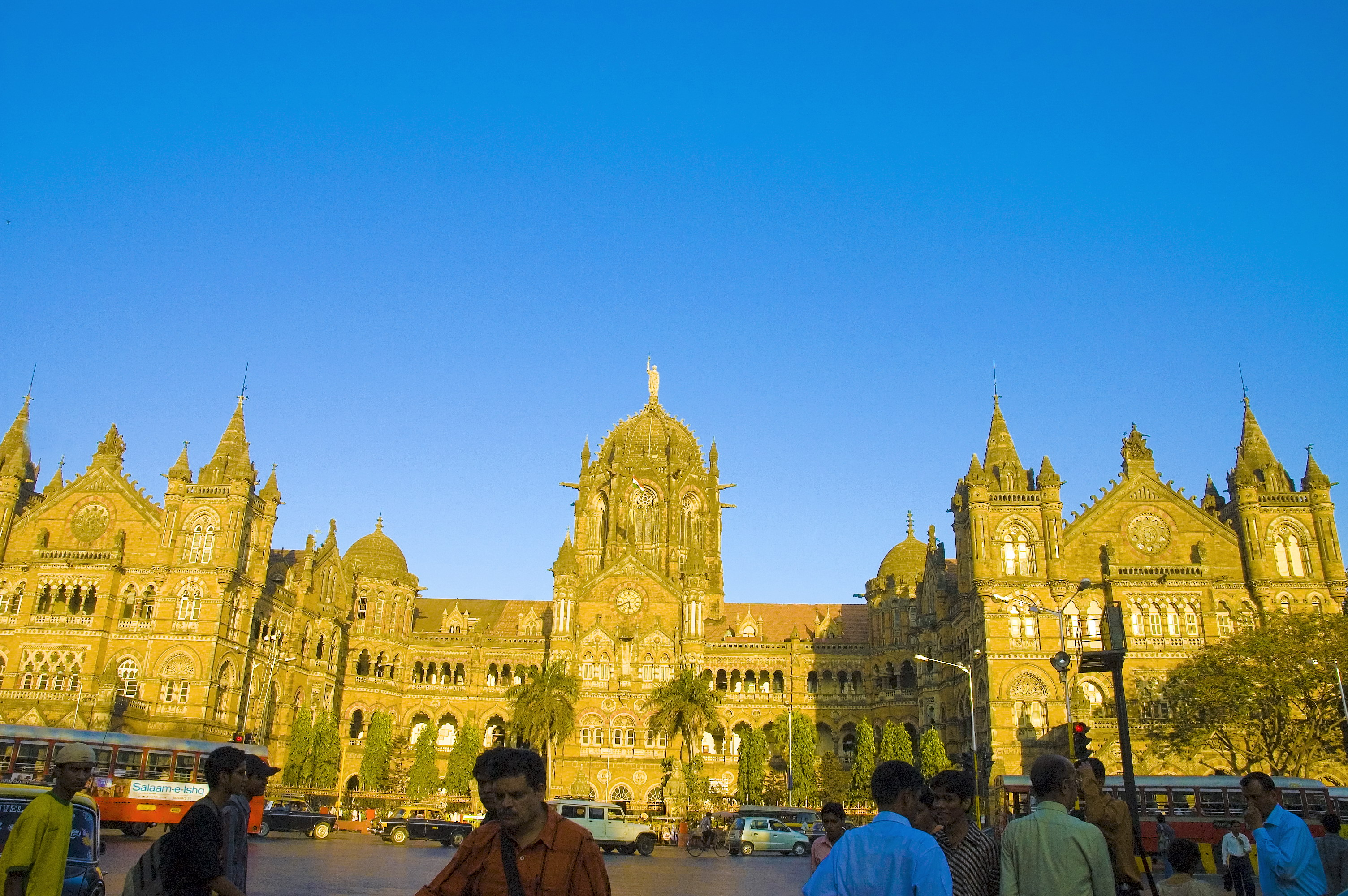
Chhatrapati Shivaji Maharaj Terminus is a UNESCO World heritage Site

The Chhatrapati Shivaji Maharaj Terminus, designed by Frederick William Stevens. The Terminus connects with the Mahatma Phule Market, and is the headquarters of the Central Railway. Its architecture depicts figurines of "progress" and "prosperity" with a variety of sculpted animals and birds. It is said that the St Pancras railway station in London bears some similarity to Shivaji Terminus. The traditional Indian palace architecture is also reflected in its beautiful stone dome, turrets, pointed arches and eccentric ground plan. It was declared a UNESCO World Heritage Site in 2004. Every day, the Terminus pours out a phenomenal number of pedestrians into the D.N.Road.

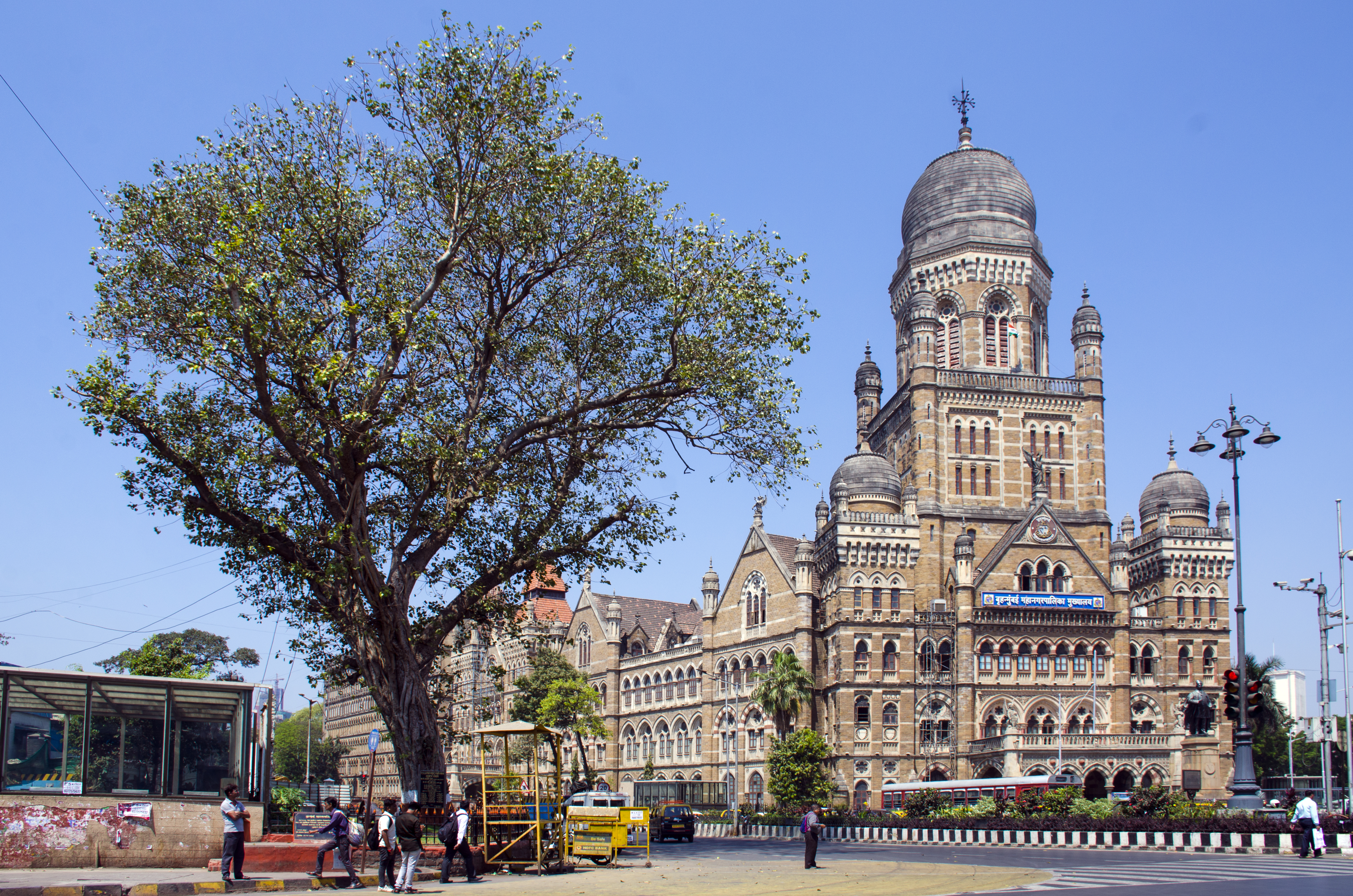
The Municipal Corporation Building

Mahatma Jyotiba Phule Mandai, also known as Crawford Market, located at the start of the D.N.Road, is a blend of Flemish and Norman architecture with a bas–relief built of coarse Coorla rubble, relieved by bright red stone from Vasai. It depicts Indian peasants in wheat fields just above the main entrance. The friezes on the outside and the fountains inside were designed by Lockwood Kipling, father of the novelist Rudyard Kipling.

The Municipal Corporation headquarters or the Brihanmumbai Municipal Corporation Building (BMC) was designed as V–shaped structure in the Gothic Revival style of architecture by the architect F W Stevens and built in 1893. Notable features of the building are its 255 ft (77.7 m) tall tower with the central dome, rising to a height of 71.5 m (234.6 ft).

Times of India building, founded as "The Bombay Times and Journal of Commerce" in 1838 is located opposite to the Victoria Terminus, a heritage structure which houses offices of the Times of India news paper. The structure, which was subject to aggressive marine environment of Mumbai since 1901, has undergone many structural and architectural modifications.

Sir Jamsetjee Jeejebhoy School of Art (J.J.School of Art), established in 1857 is the oldest art institution in India and as a university awards bachelor's degree in fine art and culture and master's degree in fine arts.

The J. N. Petit Library is at a vantage location at the corner plot at the junction of D.N. Road, P.M. Road and Napier Road. The building is named after its donor Sir Jamshetjee Nesserwanjee Petit and it was designed by architect Merwanjee Bana and built in 1898. It has undergone renovation in recent years with funds donated by Sir Dorabji Tata Trust to the library.

Vatcha Agiary, Parsi fire temple located north of Flora Fountain on the Dr. Dadabhai Naoroji Road, was built in 1881. It has an Art Deco–style featuring carvings in a distinctly Assyrian style.

The road is also a city hub, lined by banks, book, shoe and clothes shops in the city's stock market district and commercial Fort area.

== Streetscape project ==
Under the Heritage Regulations of Greater Bombay Act 1995, D.N.Road, considered to be of immense value as a historic urban streetscape, has been designated as a Grade I1 heritage streetscape. But the hectic commercial activities and the large sized signboards in the heritage road (had become a metaphor for urban chaos) caused serious concern to the Mumbai Metropolitan Regional Development Authority and public spirited people of the area. The striking colonial facades became completely obscured by free for all signages such as billboards, signboards and other forms of advertisement, which left much to be desired. The ambiance of the historic streetscape was also marred by the asynchronous street furniture, road dividers, benches and other public amenities. This necessitated launching of a conservation project titled "Dadabhai Naoroji Road Heritage Streetscape Project", by the Mumbai Metropolitan Regional Development Authority with the objective of protecting the 19th century streetscape for

restoring the architectural integrity of the street with the regulation of the signboards and the inclusion of street furniture that complemented the neo–classical architecture

Conservation methods

To facilitate conservation activities on the Mumbai's heritage sites, a trust called the MMR Heritage Conservation Society was instituted to provide grants and funding for documentation and research studies. In the first phase of the project, Mumbai Metropolitan Development Authority prepared the first urban conservation guidelines in India. This was done by the appointed architect Abha Narain Lambah assisted by a team of nine architects and undergraduate students who documented this phenomenal streetscape, which resulted, at the end of nine months of studies in 1998, in a document titled "Design Handbook for a Heritage Streetscape: Guidelines for Signage and Street furniture for Dadabhai Naoroji Road". In the absence of any records of architectural elevations or drawings of the facades in the street, the document was prepared with the following information.

- Door to door documentation was done of every building on D.N. Road – mapping elevations, surveying land records, generating data on occupants, owners, type of business and commercial establishments, existing signboards, shop fronts, hawkers and all such information considered relevant to the restoration work.
- Provides urban guidelines for signage and shop fronts through the street.
- Each building's elevation with the exact location and number of signs existing at the time was noted.
- Provides plans for relocation of the signages with modified designs without altering the exhibited shop sign (text) in the ground floor of each shop and its dimensions (area) ensuring free view of the architectural details such as cornices, keystones and pilasters, and that the architectural quality of the building was not compromised.
- To enhance the quality of the streetscape, elaborate schemes for the installation of heritage sensitive street furniture such as cast iron benches, litter bins, information signs, bus stops and railings were drawn.

Public participatory approach to conservation

In May 2001, at the initiative of the architect of the project, the local shopkeepers, occupants and commercial establishments in the street and the local municipal officer implemented, voluntarily, the regulation of the shop fronts and signage; the expenses for relocation and redesign of the shop signs were borne by each individual establishment. A local news paper facilitated design, fabrication and installation of the cast iron street furniture along the buildings, in a 100 m (328.1 ft) stretch. Transparent community involvement was a key element in the success of this endeavour.

Heritage Mile Association

A citizen's association (of the various occupants, owners, corporate establishments and shopkeepers on Dadabhai Naoroji Road) called "The Heritage Mile Association" was the outcome of the success of the initial pilot project. Set up as a non–profit group, the association's objectives are to restore the heritage character of Dr. Dadabhai Naoroji Road through public participation and private sponsorship. The achievements of the association, since its inception, are:

- Funds have been raised through local stakeholders and shopkeepers to implement street furniture through another 500 m (1,640.4 ft) stretch of the road
- More people and establishments continue to commit their financial and volunteer support to the initiative.
- Members meet every Monday to jointly discuss initiatives for the improvements
- 24x7 security, maintenance and cleaning of the area have been ensured
- An all round sense of ownership among the local shopkeepers and other stakeholders prevails

A few individual owners of buildings initiated restoration works which included removal of the air–conditioning units that were incongruent with the colonial façade.

Achievement award

UNESCO evaluated the significant participatory approach of the streetscape project that mobilised local shop owners and residents, leading to the creation of participatory citizen's association to sustain and expand conservation work in Mumbai, which has set an important precedent. The Municipal Corporation adopted urban design guidelines for the entire historic precinct. UNESCO which awarded the prestigious Asia-Pacific Heritage Award of Merit in the year 2004 to the project, in its citation by the Judges, observed:

The project’s success has generated widespread appreciation of the aesthetic, social and commercial values which have resulted from the preservation of the street’s historic character. Through its influence on urban policy and contribution to the commercial vitality of the neighbourhood, this project sets the standard for future urban streetscape revitalisation throughout India. The first of its kind in India, this ambitious streetscape project has revived the historic ambience of Dadabhai Naoroji Road of Mumbai through the restoration of shop fronts, signage and street furniture to reflect the area’s Victorian Era commercial heritage.
