= Prabhakar Balwant Vaidya =

Indian politician

Prabhakar Balwant Vaidya was an Indian politician, belonging to the Communist Party of India. He became Secretary of the Bombay City Provincial Committee of CPI in 1955. He was a member of the Maharashtra Legislative Council in the 1960s, part of the Samyukta Maharashtra Samiti caucus.
