= Samyukta Maharashtra Samiti =

Former Indian organization

Samyukta Maharashtra Movement
- Part of Chronology of statehood of Maharashtra; States Reorganisation Act, 1956
- Date: 8 August 1956 - 1 May 1960
- Location: Bombay state, India
- Goals: The creation of the separate state of Maharashtra for Marathi-speaking people from the bilingual Bombay state
- Methods: Protest marches, street protests, riots, hunger strikes, strikes
- Status: Complete
- Result: Formation of Maharashtra and Gujarat states on 1 May 1960

Parties
| Samyukta Maharashtra Samiti | Maha Gujarat Parishad; Indian National Congress |

Lead figures
| Shripad Amrit Dange (President) | T.R. Naravane (Vice President) | S.M. Joshi (General Secretary) |

Casualties
- Deaths: 106
- The movement succeeded in creating a separate Marathi-speaking state of Maharashtra including Mumbai and Nagpur as its capitals.

Samyukta Maharashtra Movement, (transl. United Maharashtra movement) commonly known as the Saṇyukta Maharashtra Samiti, was an organisation in India that advocated for a separate Marathi-speaking state in Western India and Central India from 1956 to 1960.

The Samiti demanded the creation of a new state from Marathi-speaking areas of the Bombay State, a Gujarati-Marathi state, with the city of Mumbai as its capital. The Samiti achieved its goal when the state of Maharashtra was created as a Marathi linguistic state on 1 May 1960. Members continued to advocate for the inclusion of Marathi-speaking areas in northern Karnataka such as Belgaum, Karwar, and Bidar into Maharashtra, and the newly annexed state of Goa and Damaon until the 1967 Goa Opinion Poll rejected merger with Maharashtra.

== History ==
The Samyukta Maharashtra Movement organisation was founded on 6 February 1956, at Tilak Smarak Mandir in Pune. The Samiti declared its Executive Council. Shripad Amrit Dange as the President. T. R.Naravane as Vice President and S.M. Joshi as General Secretary were selected. Many of the Prominent activists of Samyukta Maharashtra Samiti were leftists such as S. M. Joshi, Shripad Amrit Dange, Narayan Ganesh Gore, Nana Patil and Uddhavrao Patil. Other leaders included Annabhau Sathe, Maina Gawankar, Walchand Kothari, Pralhad Keshav Atre, Prabodhankar Thackeray, Pandurang Mahadev Bapat, Bhausaheb Raut, and Amar Shaikh, Gajanan Tryambak Madkholkar, Madhu Dandavate, Y. K. Souni. As a part of the campaign, Pralhad Keshav Atre used his Maratha newspaper to criticise Prime minister Jawaharlal Nehru, Morarji Desai (then chief minister of Bombay State) and S. K. Patil, the Mumbai Congress party politician who favored separation of Mumbai city from a linguistically reconstituted Maharashtra or Gujarat.

The Indian National Congress had pledged to introduce linguistic states prior to Independence. However, after Independence, Jawaharlal Nehru and Vallabhbhai Patel were adamantly opposed to linguistic states. They perceived linguistic states as a threat to the integrity of India. For the first time and perhaps the only time, Rashtriya Swayamsevak Sangh and its chief Madhav Sadashiv Golwalkar supported Nehru and Patel against redrawing of the map along linguistic lines. The catalyst to the creation of a States Re-organization Commission was the fasting death of Telugu nationalist Potti Sreeramulu. In 1956, the SRC (States Re-organisation Committee) recommended creation of linguistic states of Andhra Pradesh, Kerala and Karnataka but recommended a bi-lingual state for Maharashtra-Gujarat, with Bombay as its capital but Vidarbha outside Maharashtra. Further, they recommended the creation of Vidarbha state to unite the Marathi-speaking people of former Hyderabad State with Marathi-speaking areas of Central Provinces and Berar state. On 21 November 1955, demonstrators were fired upon by the police at Flora Fountain in the capital city of Mumbai. Flora Fountain was subsequently renamed Hutatma Chowk or "Martyr's Crossroad" in their memory. It is estimated that in a total of 106 people were shot by security forces during the period of agitation and at different places. Morarji Desai, who was the then chief minister of Bombay State was later removed and replaced by Yashwantrao Chavan as a result of criticism related to the 21 November incident. Nehru's speech dissenting with the SRC led C. D. Deshmukh, the then Finance Minister of the Nehru Cabinet to resign his post in January 1956. This led to the creation of the predecessor movement Sanyukta Maharashtra Parishad, inaugurated on 1 November 1956, causing a great political stir and, under the leadership of Keshavrao Jedhe, a whole party meeting was held in Pune and Samyukta Maharashtra Samiti was founded on 6 February 1956. In the second general election of 1957, the Samiti defeated the stalwarts of Congress by securing 101 seats out of 133, including 12 from Bombay. The Congress party could form a government only with the support of Gujarat, Marathwada and Vidarbha.

The Samyukta Maharashtra Samiti achieved its goal on 1 May 1960, when the State of Bombay was partitioned into the Marathi-speaking State of Maharashtra and the Gujarati-speaking state of Gujarat. However Goa (then a Portuguese colony), Belgaum, Karwar and adjoining areas, which were also part of the Maharashtra envisaged by the Samiti, were not included in Maharashtra state. Prominent leaders of the Samyukta Maharashtra Samiti decided to quit the organization after 1 May 1960, but the then chairman of the Samiti, Udhavrao Patil, continued his fight for the 862 Marathi-speaking villages of Karnataka that were excluded in 1960.

== Participants ==
Notable individuals who participated in the movement include -

- Shripad Amrit Dange
- Shreedhar Mahadev Joshi
- Pralhad Keshav Atre
- Prabodhankar Thackeray
- Pandurang Mahadev Bapat
- Keshavrao Jedhe
- Madhu Dandavate
- Udhavrao Patil
- Shankarrao Deo
- Ahilya Rangnekar
- Annabhau Sathe
- Gajanan Tryambak Madkholkar
- C. D. Deshmukh
- Narayan Ganesh Gore
- Gopalrao Bajirao Khedkar

== Result ==
Location of Maharashtra

- As a result of the SMS movement's advocacy, the states of Maharashtra (with Mumbai and Nagpur as its capitals) and Gujarat (with Ahmedabad as its capital) were formed according to the Bombay Reorganisation Act 1960, enacted by the Parliament of India on 25 April 1960.
- The inaugural government was formed under Yashwantrao Chavan, who became the first Chief Minister of Maharashtra.

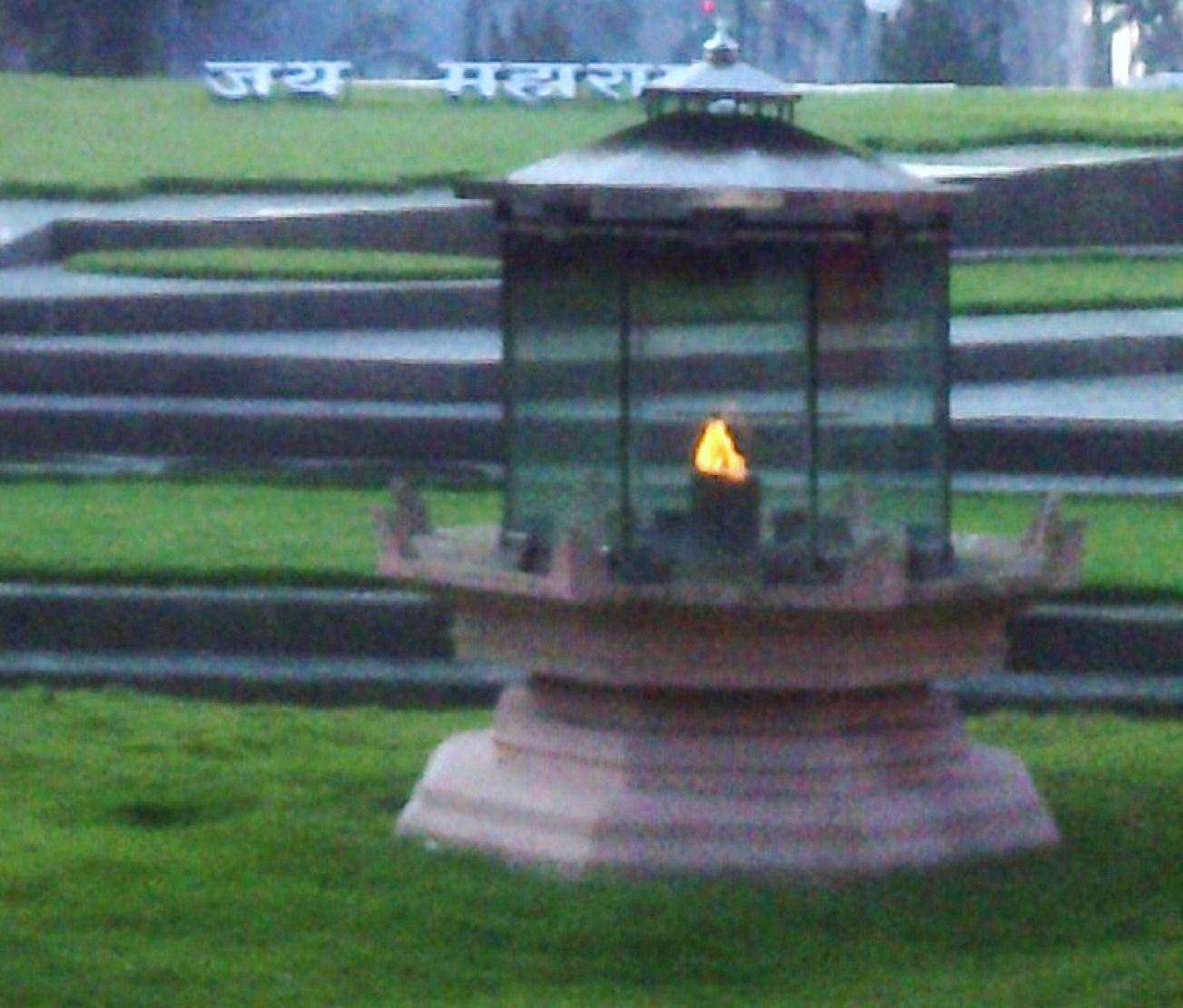
Eternal Flame at Hutatma Chowk Smarak dedicated to the martyrs

== Memorials ==
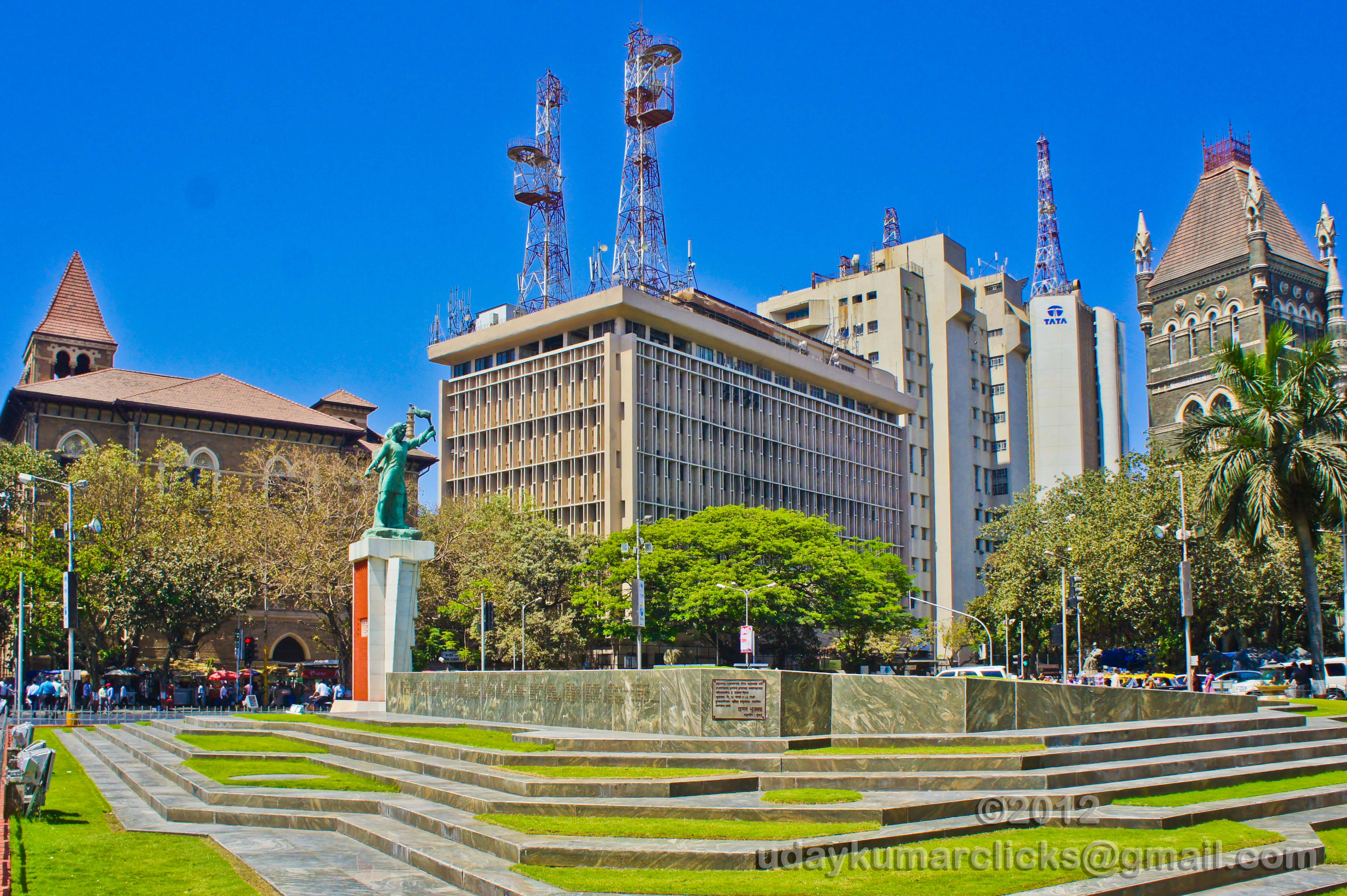
Panoramic view of Hutatma Chowk

- Hutatma Chowk was created besides the Flora Fountain in the Fort (Mumbai). It was created in the memory of 106 Martyrs who were killed in an open firing of the police during a peaceful protest.

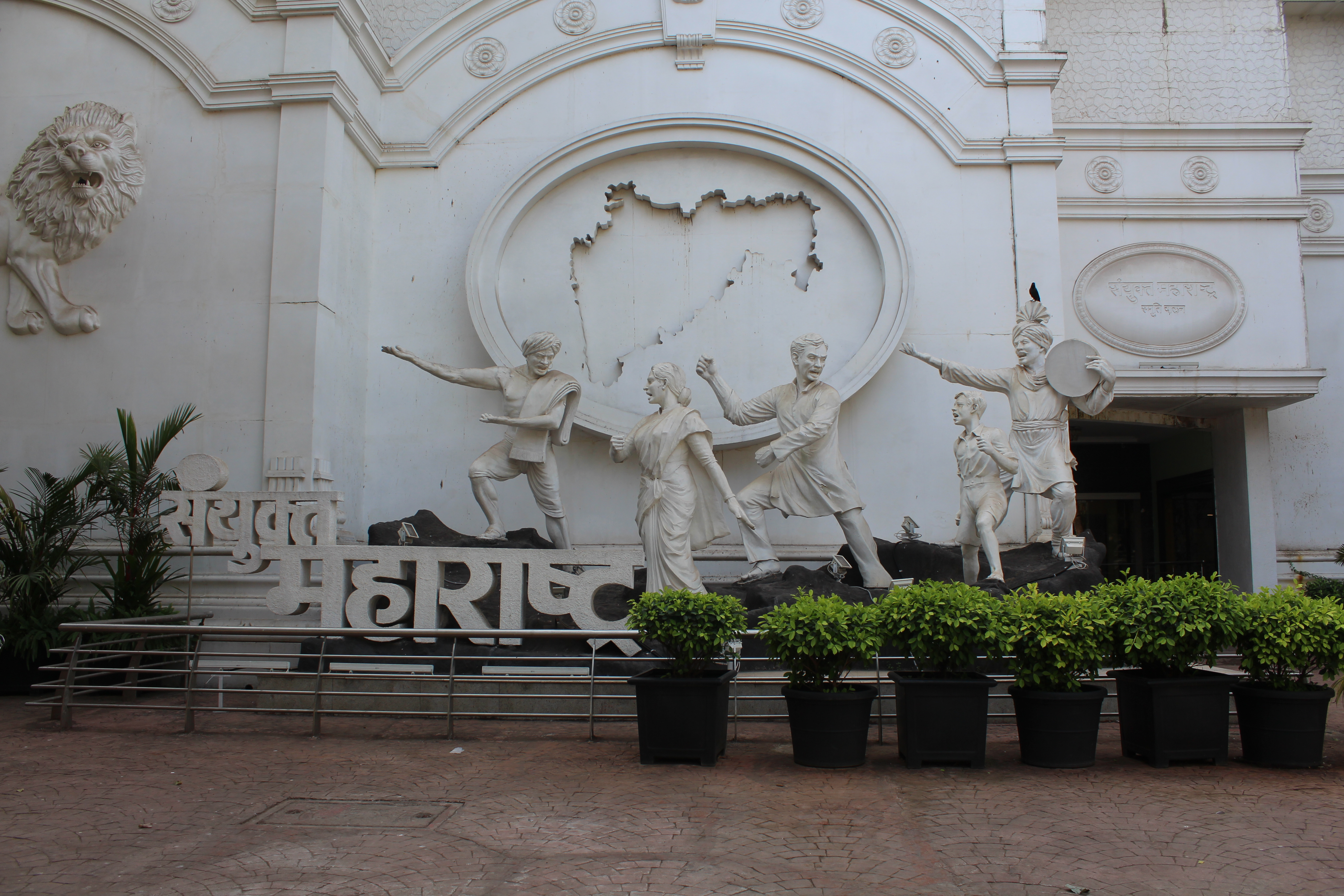
Façade of Smruti Dalan

- Samyukta Maharashtra Smruti Dalan was constructed in 2010 at Dadar. It displays the history of the formation of Maharashtra and origins of the movement. Spread over an area of 2,800 sq ft, the 3 storey gallery is a confluence of museum and art.

== Popular culture ==
Hutatma a Marathi webseries on ZEE5 starring Anjali Patil, Vaibhav Tatwawadi, Mohan Agashe, and Sachin Khedekar is based on the challenges faced by the people who participated in the movement.

Midnight's Children, a classic by Salman Rushdie, which won the Booker Prize has a backdrop of both the Samyukta Maharashtra movement as well as the Mahagujarat movement.

== Books ==
- महाराष्ट्र : एका संकल्पनेचा मागोवा (लेखक - माधव दातार)
- मुंबईसह संयुक्त महाराष्ट्राचा लढा (ऐतिहासिक, लेखिका - शिरीष पै)
- संयुक्त महाराष्ट्र काल आणि आज (संपादक - प्रा. भगवान काळे)
- संयुक्त महाराष्ट्राच्या चळवळीत शाहिरांचे योगदान, (लेखिका - सुहासिनी देशपांडे)

== See also ==
- Mahagujarat Movement
- Hutatma Chowk
- Maharashtra Day
- States Reorganisation Act
- Chronology of statehood of Maharashtra
- Nagpur Pact
- Goa Opinion Poll
- Belagavi border dispute
