= Akola Pact =

Akola Pact of 1947 was an agreement between the Congress leaders from Western Maharashtra and from then Central Provinces and Berar. It was for the creation of two sub-provinces of Mahavidarbha and Western Maharashtra. It envisaged two separate executive, legislation, judiciary and council of minister, but under a single Government.

It was signed by Barrister Ramrao Deshmukh and others on 8 August 1947.

Earlier it was in 1918, a demand for a separate Marathi-speaking state was made by a petition during the Montagu–Chelmsford Reforms. It was persuaded in three regions of Bombay State, Vidarbha and Marathwada. In 1940, Mahavidarbha Samiti under leadership of M. S. Aney, suggested a Marathi speaking State consisting of four districts from Vidarbha ( Amravati, Akola, Yavatmal, Buldhana) and four districts from Nagpur division ( Nagpur, Bhandara, Wardha and Chanda )
