= Shankarrao Deo =

Member of Constituent Assembly of India
- In office 9 December 1946 – 24 January 1950
- Constituency: Bombay

Personal details
- Born: 4 January 1894
- Died: 30 December 1974 (aged 80)
- Party: Indian National Congress
- Other name: Nanasaheb Deo
- Occupations: Freedom fighter and social activist
- Organization: Satkaryottejak Sabha
- Movement: • Indian Independence Movement • Samyukta Maharashtra Movement

Shankarrao Deo (4 January 1894 – 30 December 1974) also known as Nanasaheb Deo was an Indian freedom fighter and social activist. He was the founder of Satkaryottejak Sabha.

He participated in Quit India Movement and was arrested. He served as general secretary of Congress in 1947.

He was a member of Constituent Assembly of India in 1949. He was First Secretary of the Maharashtra Pradesh Congress Committee, 1920, and General secretary of the Congress, 1946–50, where he played a key role during the drafting of the Constitution of India and the transfer-of-power negotiations.
