= Gajanan Tryambak Madkholkar =

Indian writer (1900–1976)

Gajanan Madkholkar
- Born: Gajanan Tryambak Madkholkar; 28 December 1900
- Died: 27 November 1976 (aged 75)
- Occupations: Novelist, literary critic
- Movement: Samyukta Maharashtra Movement

Gajanan Tryambak Madkholkar (December 28, 1900 – November 27, 1976) was a Marathi novelist and a literary critic from Maharashtra, India.

== Early life ==
Madkholkar was born on December 28, 1900, in Mumbai. His father, a Marathi Brahmin priest who was financially well-off, brought up Madkholkar in a strict, highly orthodox Hindu environment.

At his age 18, Madkholkar failed in the high school matriculation examination, and abandoned his formal studies. However, he extensively read Marathi, Sanskrit, and English literature. He also carefully studied the history of Italy and Ireland. He played an important role in the United Maharashtra movement. Madkholkar was the president of the All India Marathi Literary Conference held in Belgaum in 1946. It was in this meeting that the resolution for the formation of United(Samyukta) Maharashtra was passed for the first time. Samyukra Maharashtra Committee Member :- 1) Keshavrao jedhe 2) G.T. Madkholkar 3) D.V. Potdar 3) Shankarao Dev 4) Shri. S. Navare.

== Literary work ==
At age 19, Madkholkar wrote a critical article titled Keshavasutancha Sampraday (केशवसुतांचा संप्रदाय). It got published in Navayug (नवयुग) magazine and received much critical acclaim. At age 21, Madkholkar started writing political articles. His first four articles concerned Sinn Féin movement in Ireland; they got published in the reputed Kesari (केसरी) newspaper. Later at age 22, Madkholkar wrote his critical book Adhunik Kawi-Panchak (आधुनिक कविपंचक). This book too received high acclaim.

In 1924, Madkholkar joined the editorial board of the Pune weekly Maharashtra (महाराष्ट्र). In 1944, he became the editor of the Nagpur daily Tarun Bharat (तरुण भारत). He also wrote ten critical books, twelve novels, six one-act plays, two collections of his short stories, and a few poems. In 1946 he presided over Marathi Sahitya Sammelan in Belgaum.

== List of novels ==
- नवे संसार (Nave Samsār) (1941)
- मुक्तात्मा (Muktātmā) (1933)
- चंदनवाडी (Chandanavāḍi) (1943)
- मुखवटे (Mukhvate)
- उद्धार (Uddhār)
- कांता (Kāntā)
- प्रमद्वरा (Pramadwara)
- भंगलेलें देऊळ (Bhangalelen Deuḷ)
- दुहेरी जीवन (Duherī Jīvan)
- शाप (Śāp) (1936)
- नागकन्या (Nāgakanyā)
- डाक बंगला (Ḍāk Banglā)
