= Flora Fountain =

Heritage monument in Mumbai, India

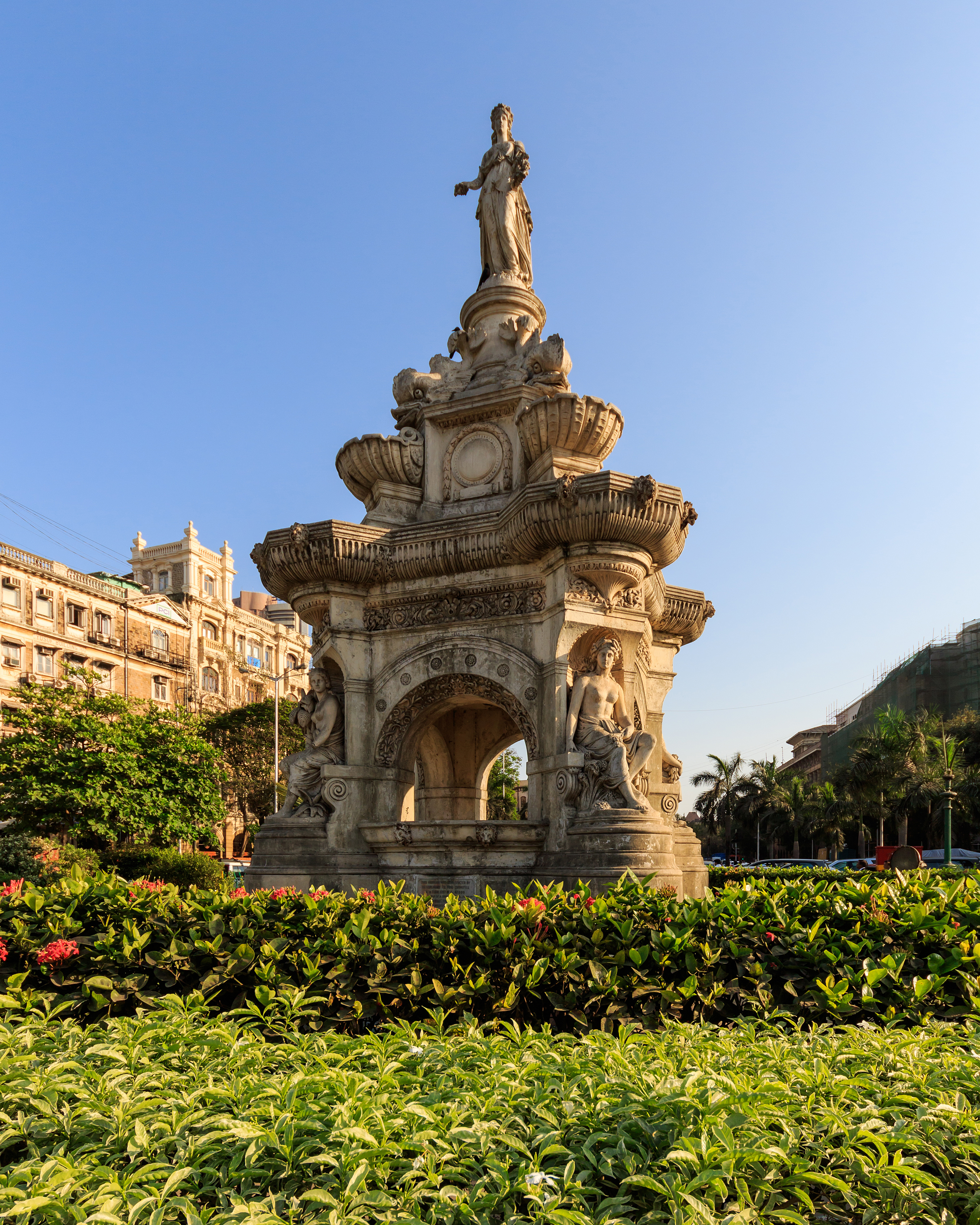

- Location within India Location within Maharashtra Location within Mumbai

General information
- Architectural style: Neo Classical and Gothic Revival
- Location: Mumbai, India
- Coordinates: 18.9325°N 72.8317°E
- Completed: 1864
- Cost: Rs 47000 (9000 pounds sterling)
- Client: Maharashtra

Technical details
- Structural system: Sculpted in imported Portland stone

Design and construction
- Architect: Richard Norman Shaw
- Engineer: James Forsythe

Flora Fountain is a Fountain located at the Hutatma Chowk is an ornamentally sculpted architectural heritage monument located at the southern end of the historic Dadabhai Naoroji Road, at the Fort business district in the heart of South Mumbai, Mumbai, India. Flora Fountain, built in 1864, depicts the Roman goddess Flora. It was built at a total cost of Rs. 47,000, or 9,000 pounds sterling, a large sum in those days.

== History ==
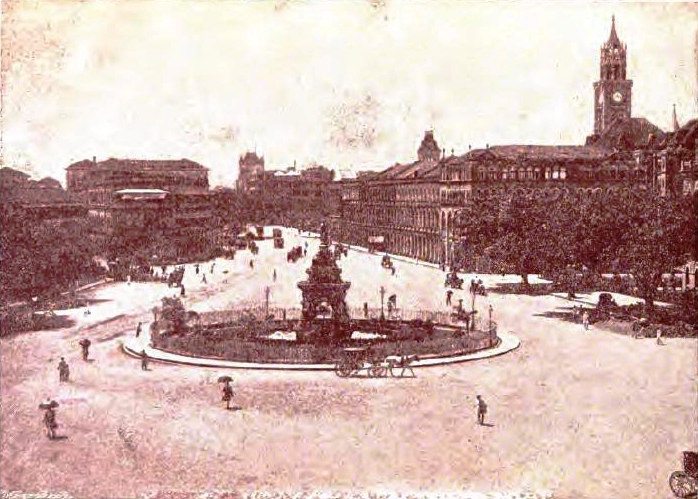
Photograph of Flora Fountain taken prior to 1904

The fountain originally intended for the Victoria Gardens, is now surmounted by the figure of Plenty ("Courtesy of Special Collections, University of Houston Libraries."). History of the Flora Fountain is traced to the time when the Old Mumbai Fort was demolished in 1860 as part of the then Governor, Sir Bartle Frère's efforts to improve civic sanitation (municipal improvements) and the urban space requirements of the growing city. Prior to this demolition, the Fort had been built between 1686 and 1743 by the British East India Company with three gates (the Apollo Gate, the Church Gate and the Bazaar Gate), a moat, esplanade, level open spaces on its western fringe (to control fires) and residences. A small road called the Hornby Road, named after the then Governor of Bombay (Mumbai) between 1771 AD and 1784 AD, also existed at the old Fort area. Consequent to the demolitions, the Hornby road was widened into a broad avenue and on its western side commercial plots were developed to build new commercial buildings in Neo Classical and Gothic Revival designs. The Dadabhai Naoroji Road (D. N. Road), developed into a veritable sight of colonial splendor with Crawford Market linked to the Chhatrapati Shivaji Maharaj Terminus anchoring the northern end and the Flora Fountain, forming the southern end of the Mile Long Road.

The Flora Fountain was erected at the exact place where the Church gate (named after St. Thomas Cathedral, Mumbai ) stood before its demolition along with the Mumbai Fort. It was constructed by the Agri–Horticultural Society of Western India, out of a donation of Rs 20,000 by Cursetjee Fardoonjee Parekh. Designed by Richard Norman Shaw, it was sculpted in imported Portland stone by James Forsythe. A white coat of oil paint has to some extent marred the antiquity of the structure. The fountain was originally to be named after Sir Bartle Frère, the Governor of Bombay at the time, whose progressive policy had resulted in many of the great public buildings of Mumbai. However, the name was changed before the fountain was unveiled as Flora Fountain, named after Flora, a Roman Goddess of flowers and the season of spring; her majestic and pretty Portland stone statue adorns the top of the fountain. The four corners of the fountain have four life-sized female mythological figures carrying foliage to represent the four seasons.

The fountain was originally intended to be built at the Jijamata Udyaan at Byculla but, in 1908, the grass plot and the palm trees that had camouflaged the fountain were cleared for creating space for pedestrians and horse–traffic between the tram lines and the kerb of the fountain.

== Hutatma chowk ==
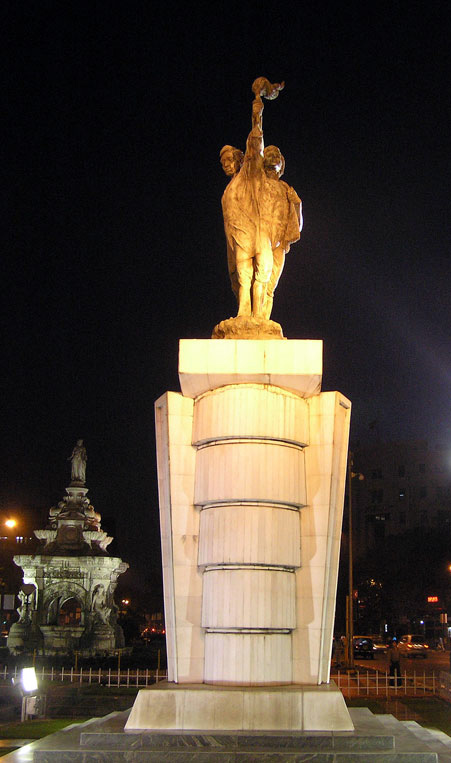
The Hutatma memorial with the Flora Fountain, in the background

From the time the Flora Fountain was built in 1864 and until 1960, the chowk (square) where five streets meet (hence, also known as the Piccadilly Circus of Mumbai) and the fountain stands now, was named as the Flora Fountain area. But in 1960, to commemorate the people who laid their lives in the turbulent birth of Maharashtra State at the square, it was renamed as the Hutatma Chowk with a stone statue bearing a pair of torch-holding patriots. The Flora Fountain, surrounded by the British Victorian era heritage buildings, is very much part of the chowk and has been declared a heritage structure and it continues to charm visitors with its beauty and with its spray of water. It sits well alongside the Hutatma statue which adorns the chowk. (Picture depicts the two structures). It was the decision of the Maharashtra Legislative Assembly that recommended to the Government "to take necessary steps to erect as early as possible a memorial at Flora Fountain in Bombay in commemoration of the sacrifices of the persons who died on the police firing at Flora Fountain in Bombay in the month of November 1955."

== Nostalgia ==
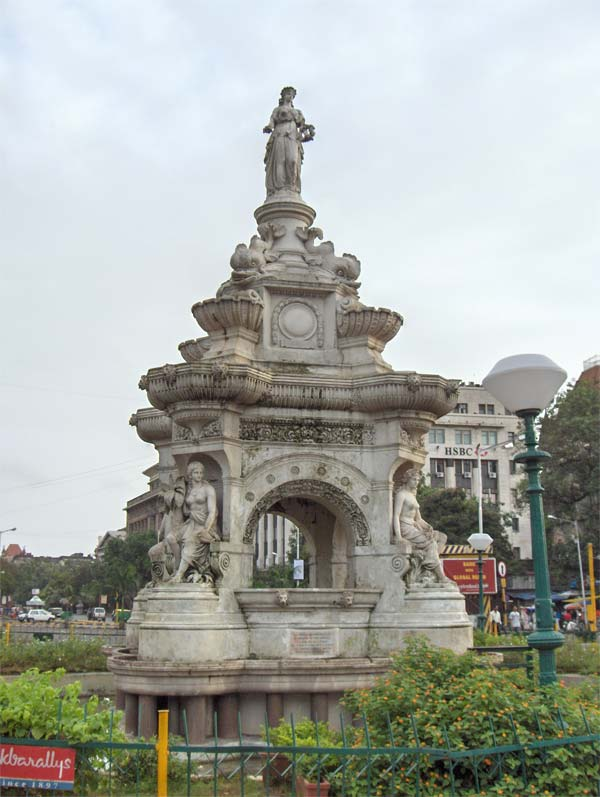
Flora Fountain

Nostalgic writing by a cricketer, an unnamed resident of Mumbai who played street cricket in front of the fountain in his youth, reads that the fountain at the centre of the Mumbai city evokes feelings:

The Centres of the world are well etched in the mind: the New York City's Time Square and the Paris's Champs-Élysées, London's Piccadilly Circus. Even now I feel a curious magic about Mumbai's Flora Fountain. We called it the heart of the city and so it was.

== Poetic expression ==
A poem in Marathi language by Niranajan Bhagat translated to English extols the beauty of the Flora Fountain thus:

A Glass and concrete jungle;
In its midst always
Quiet, comely,
With hope filled face,
she stands
Flora
A dream of spring in her matchless eyes,
holding in both hands stone flowers.
About her, in all corners,
Iron butterflies fly round and round

And lifeless insects play

== Gallery ==
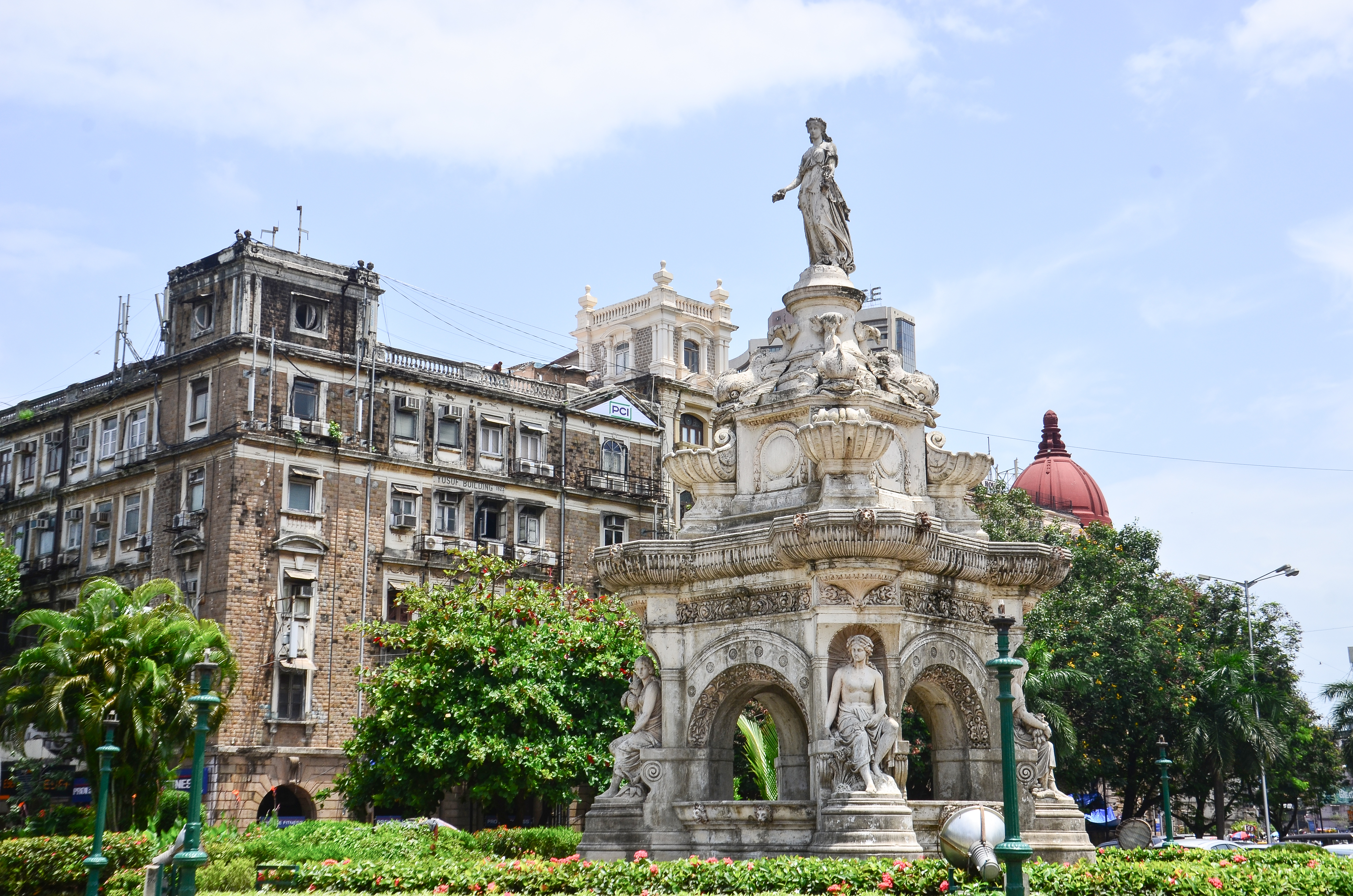
Flora Fountain in Hutatma Chowk

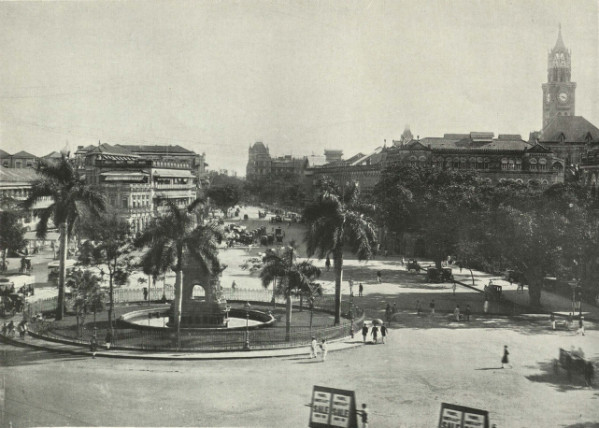
The Flora Fountain, c. 1905

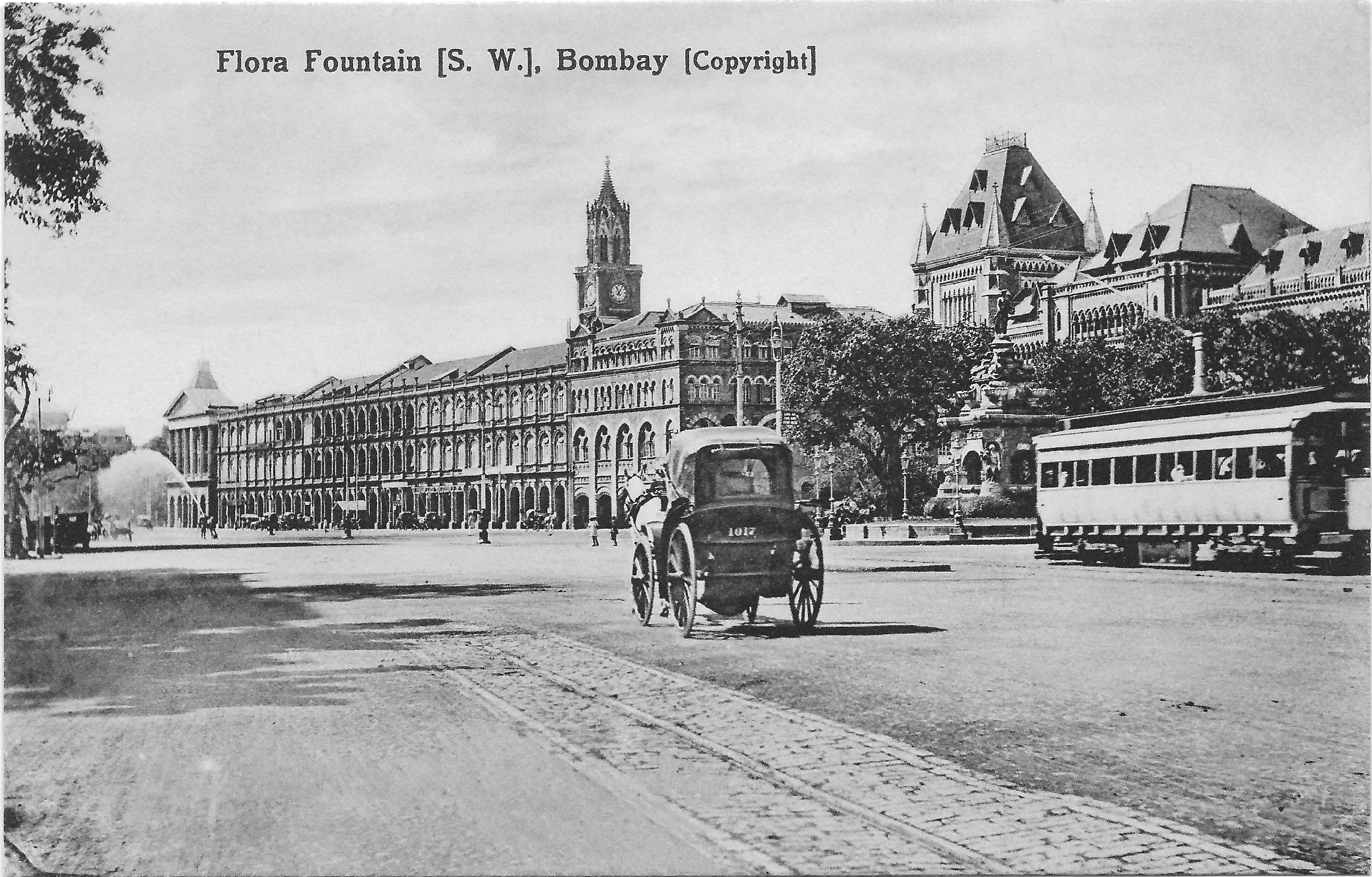
Flora Fountain area, pre World War I

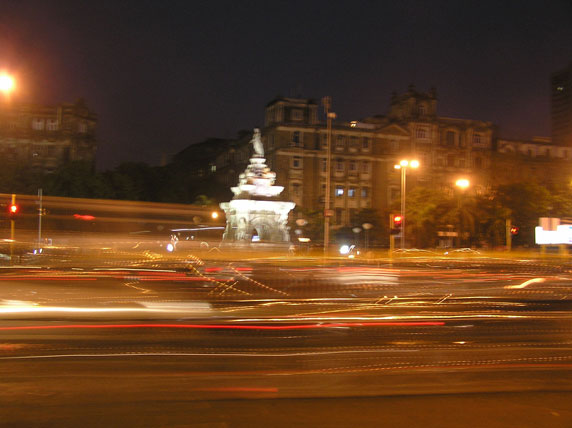
Traffic stream at Flora Fountain at night

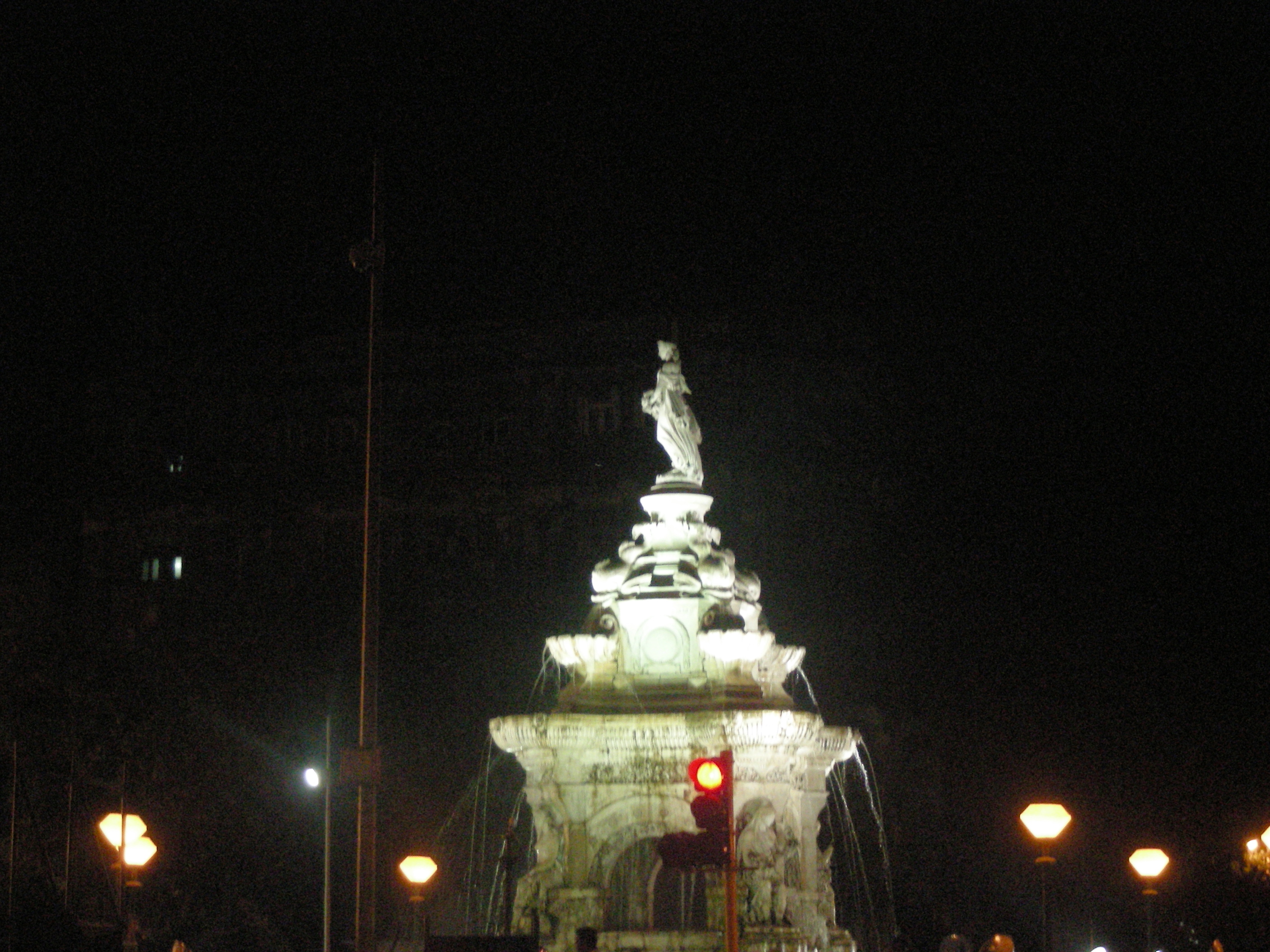
Fountain in action at night

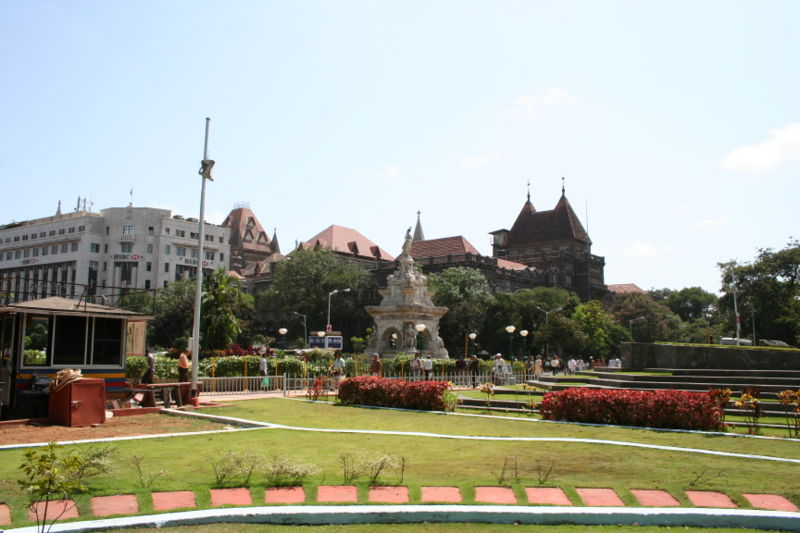
Flora Fountain at Hutatma Chowk

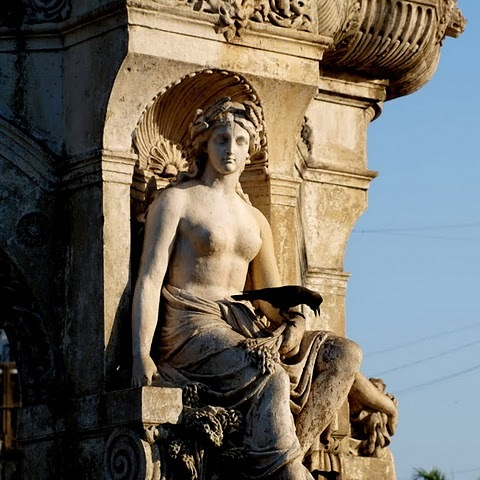
Goddess Flora in Flora Fountain

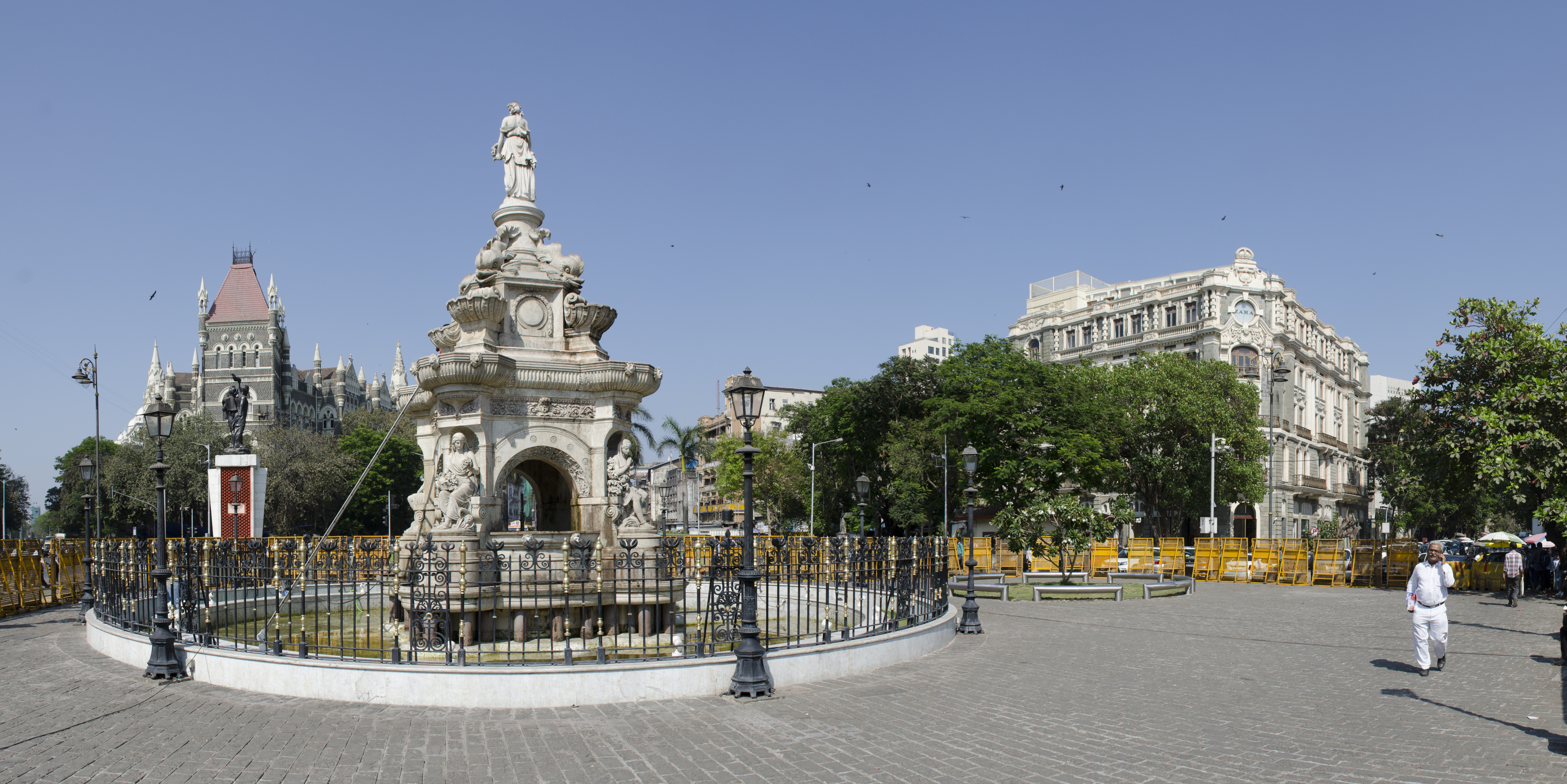
Panoramic view of Flora Fountain
