= Hutatma Chowk =

Square in Mumbai, Maharashtra, India

Hutatma Smarak Chowk
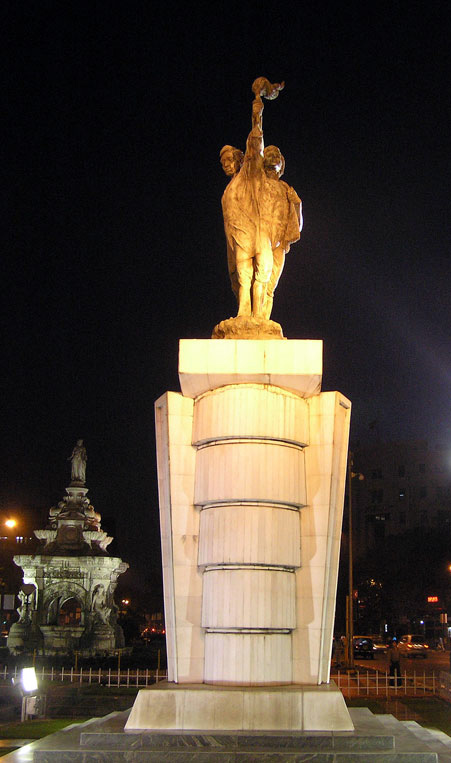
- Hutatma Chowk Memorial

- Location within Mumbai

General information
- Location: Mumbai, India
- Coordinates: 18.9325°N 72.8317°E
- Construction started: 1960
- Completed: 1960
- Client: Maharashtra

Technical details
- Structural system: Makrani Patthar

Hutatma Chowk (Martyrs' Square, officially, Hutatma Smarak Chowk, "Martyrs Memorial Square") is a square in South Mumbai, Maharashtra, India. The square hosts Flora Fountain and was known by that name until 1961 when it was officially renamed in memory of the members of Samyukta Maharashtra Samiti, who died when police fired upon their peaceful demonstration in 1956. A statue of a "Martyr with a Flame" stands next to Flora Fountain.

== History ==
Hutatma Chowk is located in the busy financial district of Fort. It derives its present name from an incident in 1956 when a peaceful demonstration by the Samyukta Maharashtra Samiti (United Maharashtra Committee) was fired upon by the police resulting in 106 deaths. The incident was part of ongoing struggles of the Samyukta Maharashtra Samiti, amongst others, for the creation of the State of Maharashtra. The shooting proved to be a major impetus for the creation of Maharashtra on 1 May 1960.

The Hutatma Chowk square is lined on all sides by buildings constructed during the British Raj. An ornate fountain surrounded by delicately carved figures forms the center of the huge square. This was the Flora Fountain.

The fountain itself was built in 1864 and represents the Roman Goddess Flora, the Goddess of Abundance. Today, it is a heritage structure. It cost Rs. 47,000 to build, a large sum at the time, and was constructed by the Agri-Horticultural Society of Western India. Cursetjee Fardoonjee Parekh donated Rs.20,000 towards the construction of this fountain. The fountain was carved from stone that was imported from Portland. It was built in honour of Sir Bartle Frere, who was the Governor of Bombay at the time. Sir Bartle was responsible for dismantling Bombay Fort and shaping much of modern Mumbai. Initially it was to be named after the Governor but the name was changed before the fountain was unveiled. When it was constructed, it was in the middle of the city. Flora fountain stands in exactly the same place where the original Churchgate of Bombay Fort stood. The area around Flora Fountain is the business center of Mumbai and is surrounded by offices, banks, colleges and shops.

== Gallery ==
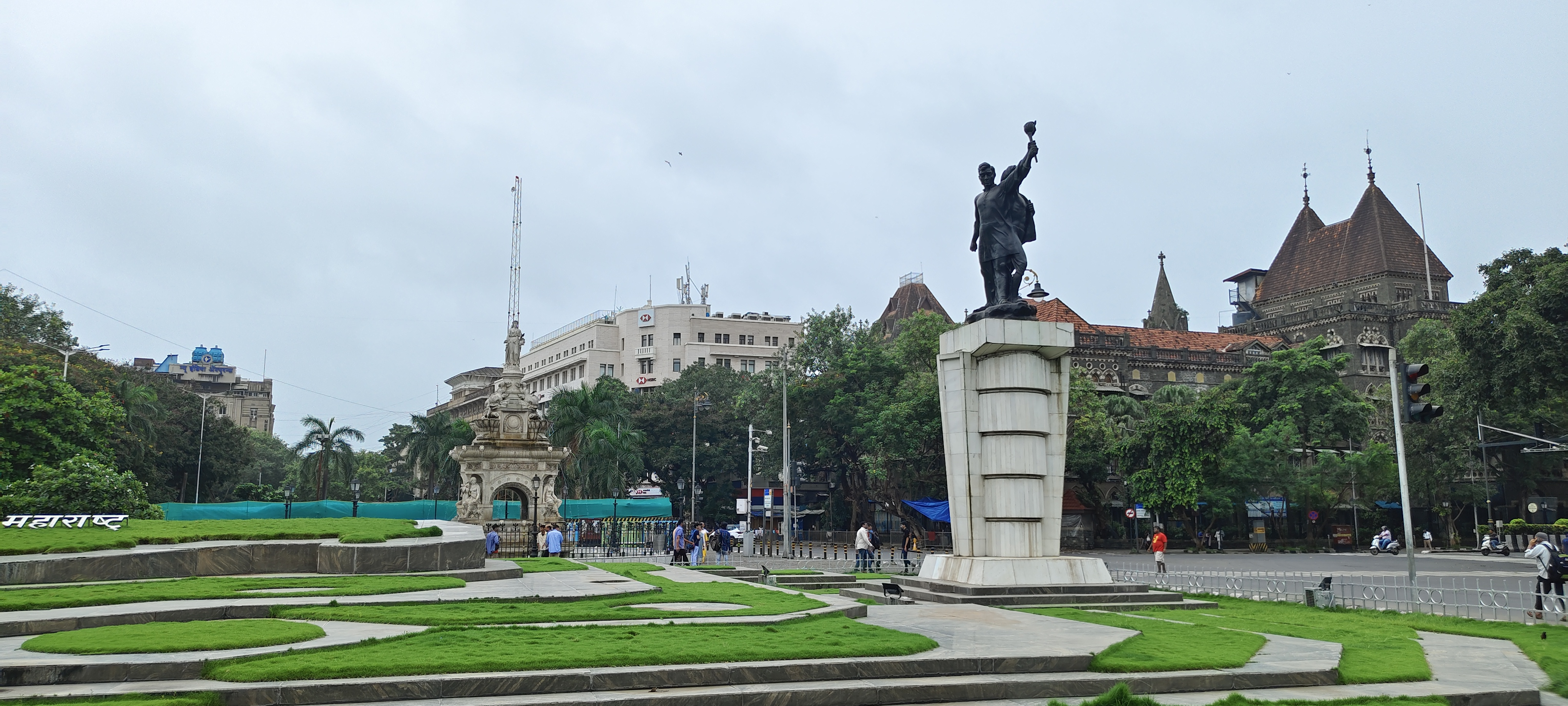
View of the Hutatma Chowk, showing the Flora Fountain and the Hutatma memorial

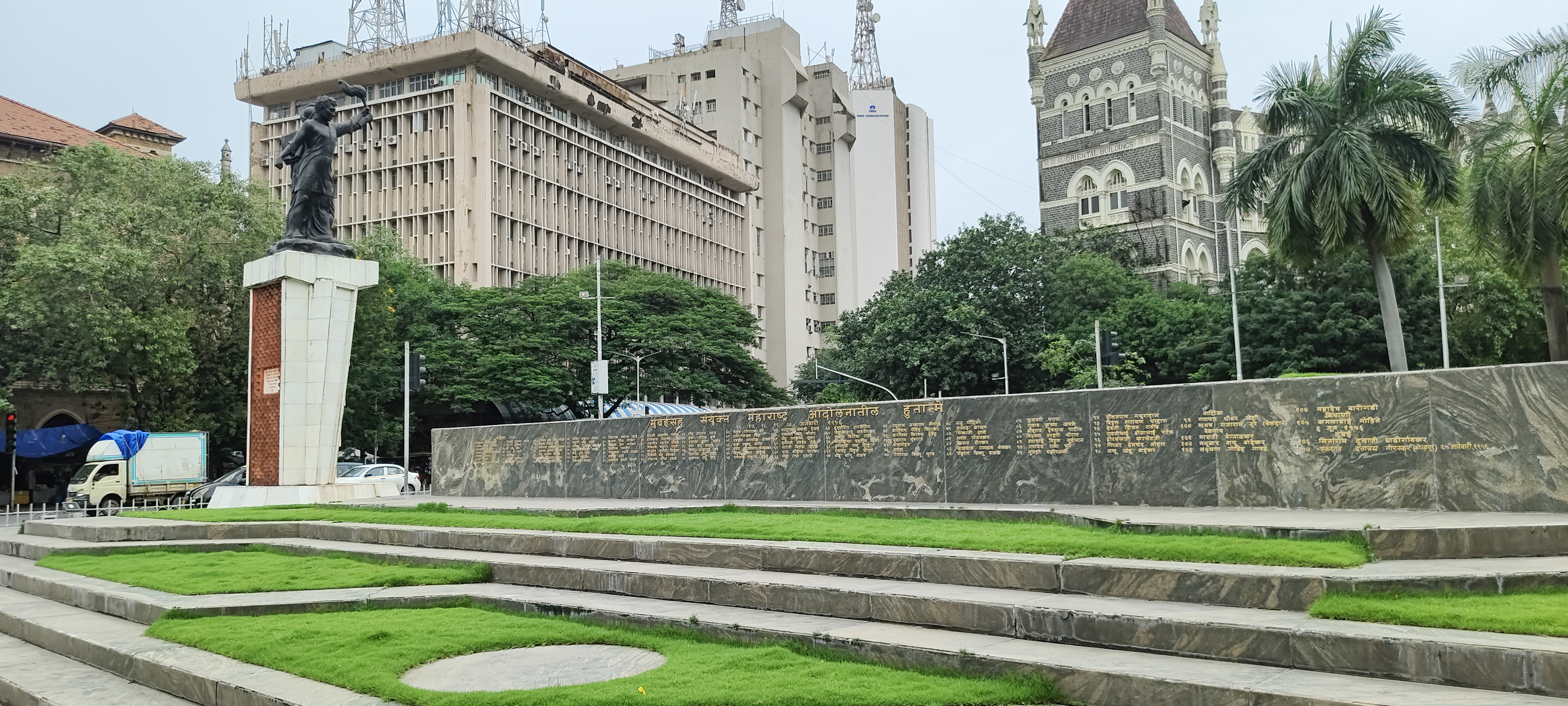
Hutatma Memorial, along with a structure bearing the name of the 'Hutatmas'

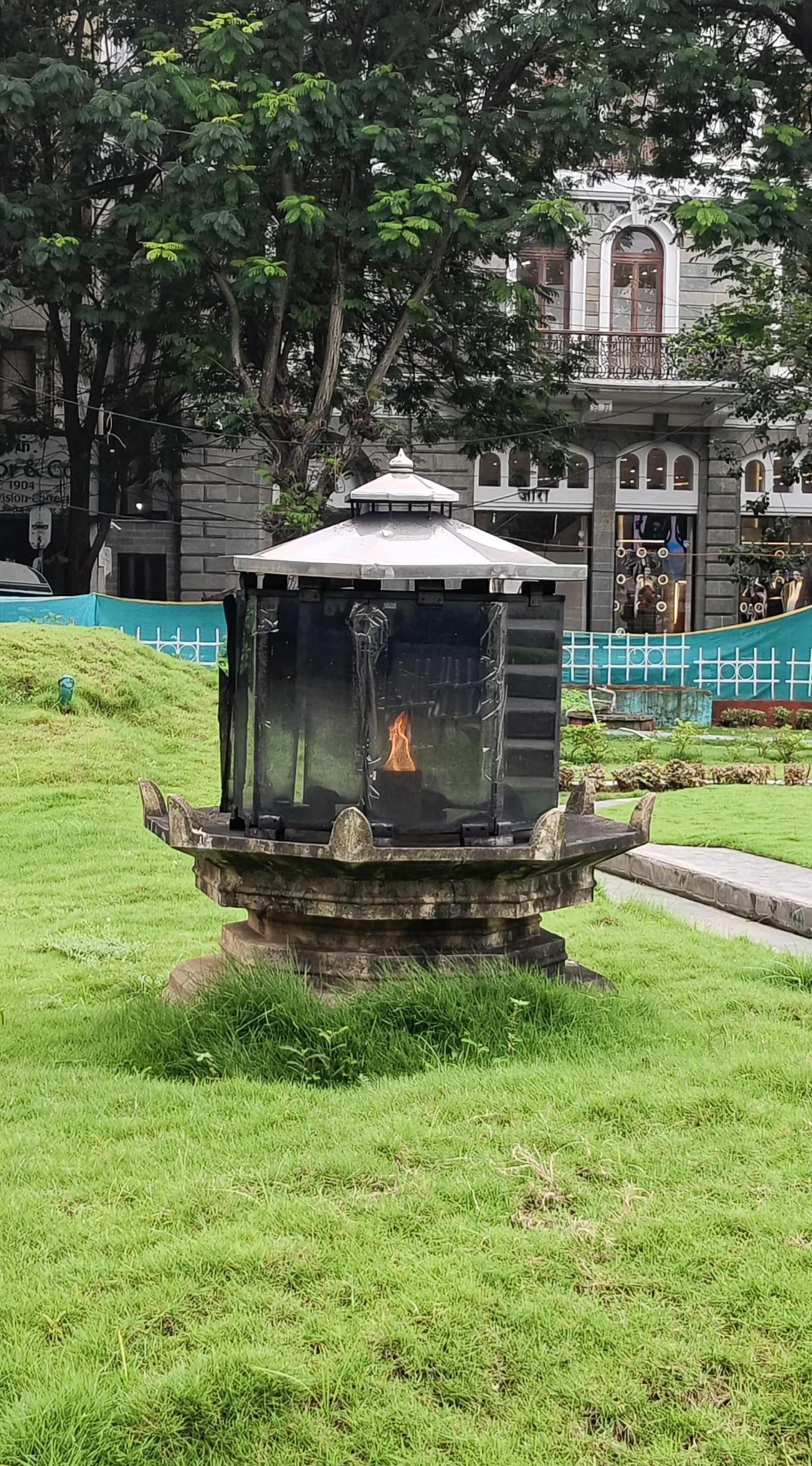
Amar Jyot at Hutatma Chowk
