= Art Deco in Mumbai =

Indian architecture style

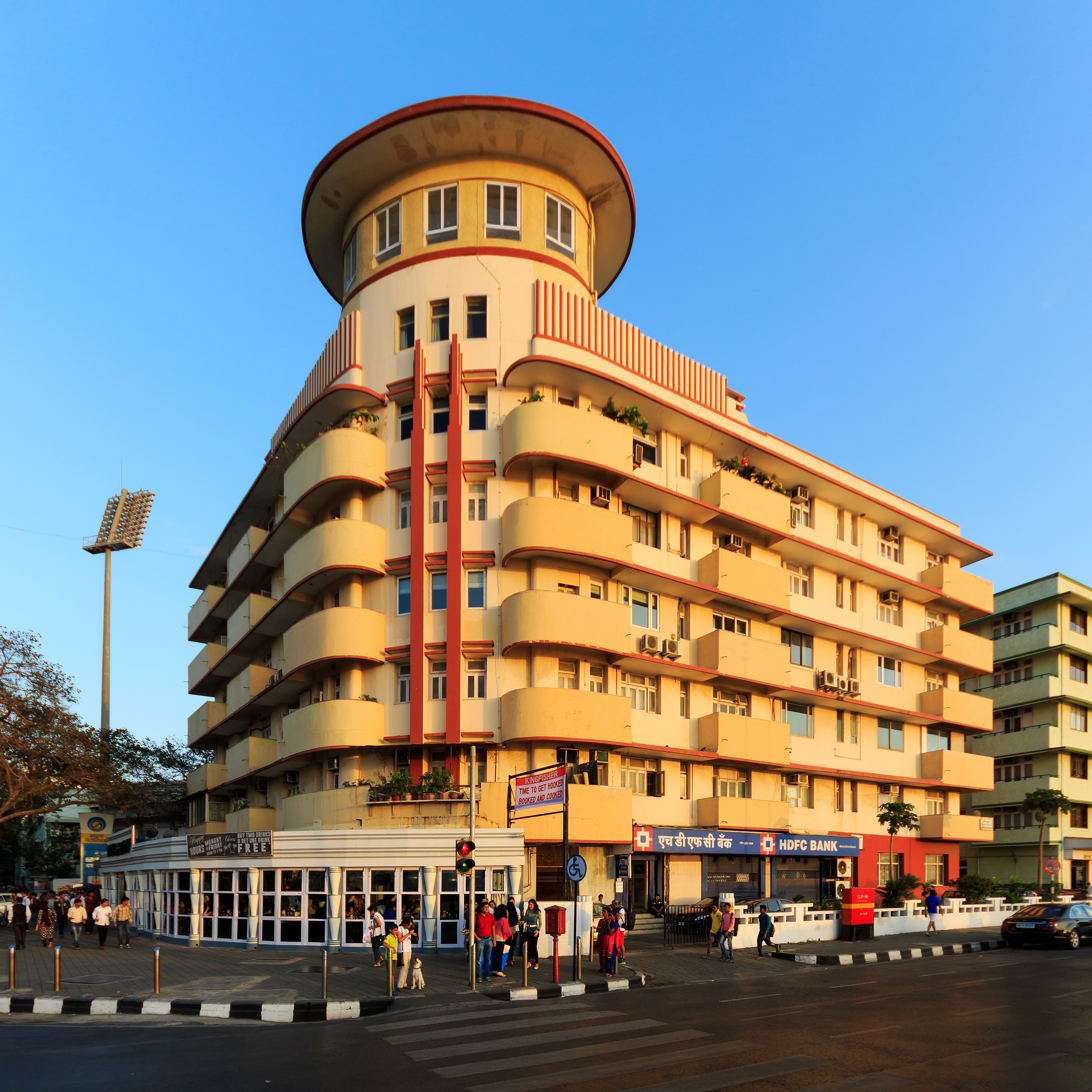
Art Deco building at the Marine Drive

The Art Deco style in Mumbai, India is a notable feature of the architecture of the city. It was used primarily for office buildings, residences and movie theaters, during a period when India was part of the British Empire. On 30 June 2018, an ensemble of such buildings were officially recognized as a World Heritage site by the UNESCO World Heritage committee held in Bahrain as the Victorian and Art Deco Ensemble of Mumbai.

The BBC reported that Mumbai has at least 200 Art Deco buildings in the city.

== History ==
The Indian Institute of Architects, founded in Bombay in 1929, played a prominent role in propagating the Art Deco movement. In November 1937, this institute organized the 'Ideal Home Exhibition' held in the Town Hall in Mumbai which spanned over 12 days and attracted about one hundred thousand visitors. As a result, it was declared a success by the 'Journal of the Indian Institute of Architects'. The exhibits displayed the 'ideal', or better described as the most 'modern' arrangements for various parts of the house, paying close detail to avoid architectural blunders and present the most efficient and well-thought-out models. The exhibition focused on various elements of a home ranging from furniture, elements of interior decoration as well as radios and refrigerators using new and scientifically relevant materials and methods. Guided by their desire to emulate the west, the Indian architects were fascinated by the industrial modernity that Art Deco offered. The western elites were the first to experiment with the technologically advanced facets of Art Deco, and architects began the process of transformation by the early 1930s.

Bombay's expanding port commerce in the 1930s resulted in the growth of educated middle class population. It also saw an increase of people migrating to Bombay in search of job opportunities. This led to the pressing need for new developments through Land Reclamation Schemes and construction of new public and residential buildings. Parallelly, the changing political climate in the country and the aspirational quality of the Art Deco aesthetics led to a whole-hearted acceptance of the building style in the city's development. Most of the buildings from this period can be seen spread throughout the city neighbourhoods in areas such as Churchgate, Colaba, Fort, Mohammed Ali Road, Cumbala Hill, Dadar, Matunga, Bandra and Chembur.

== Characteristics ==
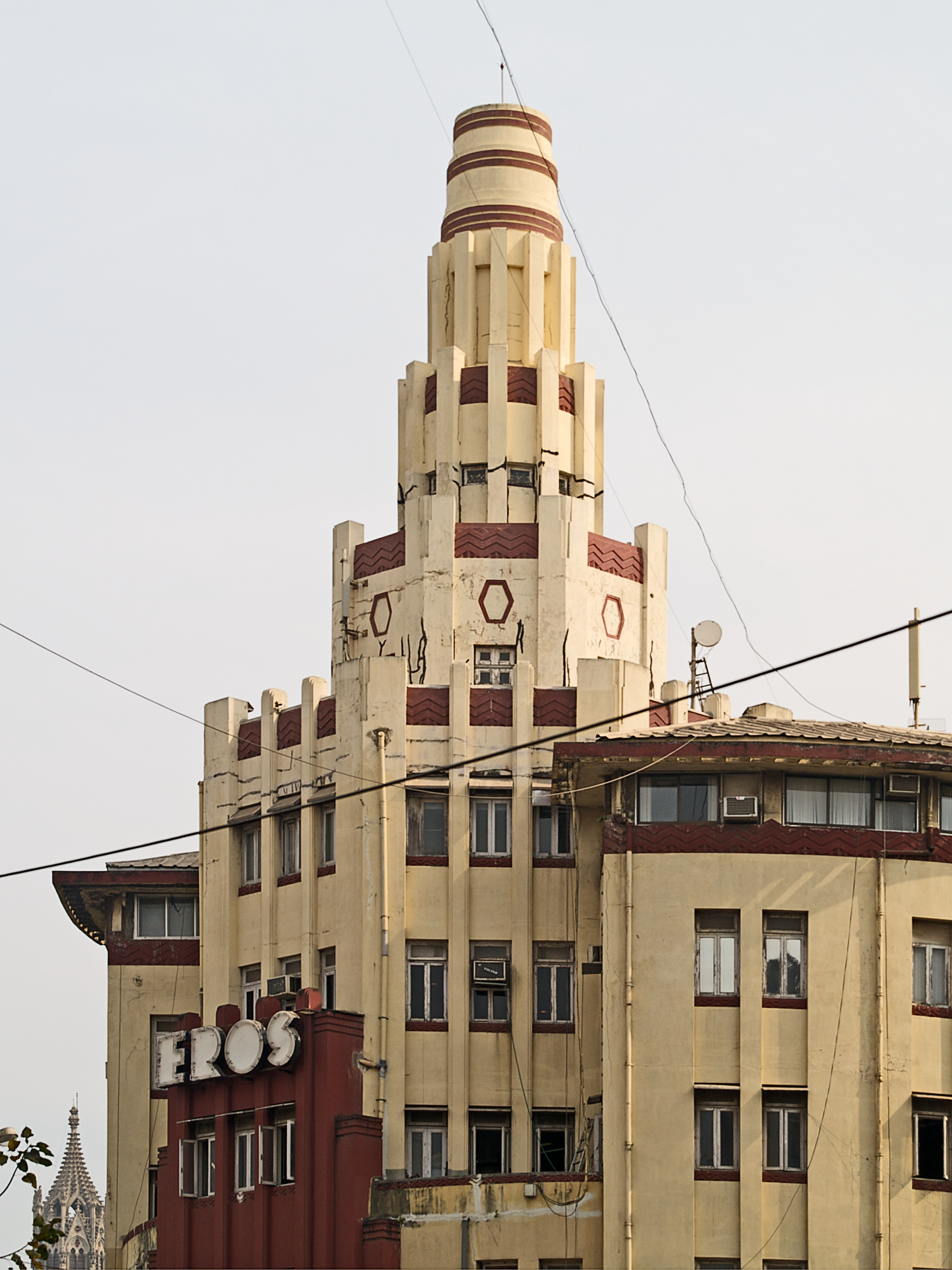
Eros Cinema (1938)

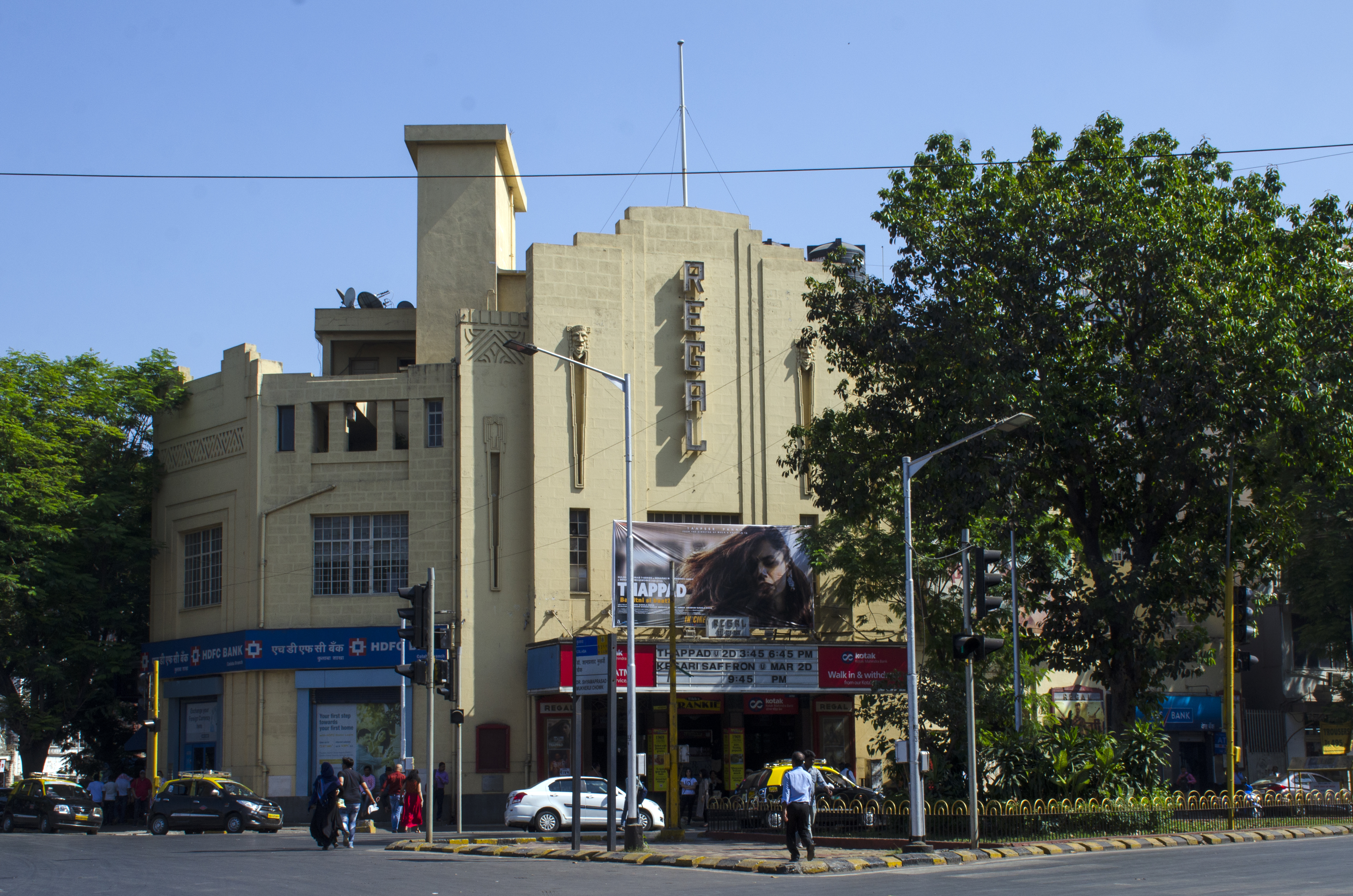
Regal Cinema

=== Streamlining and rounded corners ===
Rounded corners and streamlined designs influenced by the design of airplanes, ships, trains, and automobiles in the early 20th century, made buildings appear aerodynamic, fast, futuristic and sleek. This was done with the intention to make Art Deco buildings appear modern and sophisticated.

=== Nautical features ===
Being a port city, Bombay was influenced by the era's new ocean liners: Bremen (1929), Queen Mary (1936) and Queen Elizabeth (1940). As a result of this enchantment with the luxury and grandeur that these ocean liners brought with them buildings were manifested with nautical features such as porthole windows, ship deck-style railings and observatory towers.

=== The frozen fountain ===
The motif of the frozen fountain, a historical symbol for eternal life was popularized by the French Glass designer Rene Lalique. Some of his best-known works were seen in his designs at the 1926 Paris exposition. This symbol soon became a prevalent feature in building facades and metal grills on Art Deco buildings across Bombay

== Influences ==
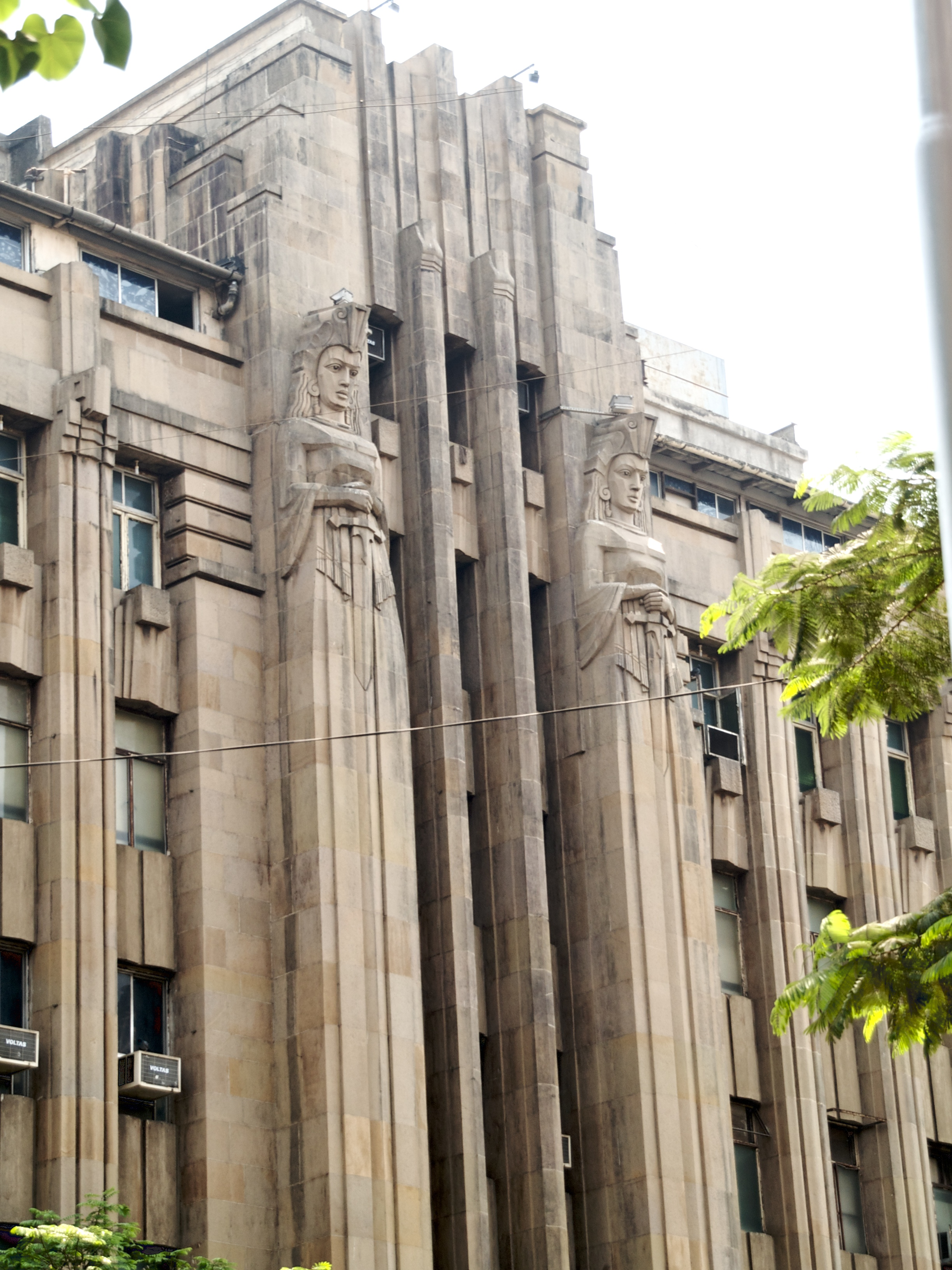
New India Assurance Building (1936)

While Art Deco buildings in Bombay were associated with futurism, as seen in their streamlined and sleek facades, certain buildings also integrated themes of traditional Indian mythology into their design. Depictions of toiling Indian farmers, Hindu gods and goddesses and figures from Indian mythology were often incorporated into facade reliefs.

Egyptian and classical Elements The discovery of the tomb of King Tutakhamun in Egypt lead to a worldwide fascination with ancient Egyptian themes and symbols. Sphinxes, hard edged geometry and hieroglyphic styles made their way into the Indian urban Landscape. Influences of the features of traditional Greek and Roman temples could also be seen in buildings across Bombay.

=== Tropical imagery ===
Influenced by the city's abundance of tropical vegetation, Bombay's Art deco buildings are externally decorated with stylized forms of waves, sunburst rays, tropical flora and fauna which can be seen in porch railings, facades, metal balcony grilles, ornamental gates and porch railings.

=== Eyebrows ===
Eyebrows are projecting edges or "shelves" above a structures portico to shade from direct sunlight and keep the interior cool. These also highlighted the rhythmic horizontality of buildings.

=== Architectural lettering ===
Art Deco lettering on buildings took on the sleek and streamlined appeal of the structure of these buildings. Typefaces consisted of a combination of straight lines and segments of circles.

=== Ziggurats and zigzags ===
In the 1930s, the height of buildings in Bombay was limited by strict developmental regulations over reclaimed land. In order to evoke allusions to the verticality of skyscrapers whilst being restricted in their height, Art Deco architects used the concept of stepping up and stepping back of roof lines, used to mimic a ziggurat (a temple tower design adopted by Sumerians, Babylonians and Assyrians of ancient Mesopotamia).

== Materials ==
The Art Deco movement encouraged the replacement of materials such as stone, brick and concrete with steel columns, beams and reinforced concrete. The advent of Reinforced concrete in the early 1900s proved to be a boon in disguise providing a changeover to high- rise buildings to accommodate increasing population density in Bombay.

== Notable buildings ==
In Malabar and Cumbala hills, attractive Art Deco homes were built for the rich. Other parts of the city such as Fort, Apollo Bunder, Colaba, Dadar, and Mahim also witnessed the construction of office buildings, homes and apartment buildings created to fit the style of Art Deco. Soon the construction of a forty foot wide road and a ten-foot wide pavement on Marine Drive began. This was accompanied by the construction of Art Deco apartment blocks looking out onto the Arabian Sea. The street behind these apartment blocks was lined with modern buildings of steel and concrete that were separated from the medieval Victorian structures by the Oval Maidan. The centerpieces of the Art Deco glorification of modernity were the grand new Cinema theatres: Regal, Eros and Metro. These were followed by the construction of the New Empire and Liberty cinemas, after the Second World War. There were also Art Deco fuel stations such as the Karfule.

== Art Deco architects ==
A majority of Art Deco buildings in Mumbai were built by a breed of architects (mostly Indian) who were trained along the ideologies of modern architecture of the time. Other than their education, most of these architects were also sponsored by their clients to travel to world cities such as London, Paris and New York to experience and understand the architectural style (Art Deco) prevalent at the time. Upon their return, these architects designed buildings that very skillfully combined the design aesthetics of Art Deco with cultural context of India. These buildings were thoughtfully designed keeping in mind the climatic conditions prevalent in the Indian sub-continent. Climate responsive architecture and Bombay Deco were born.

One of the active architects was W. M. Namjoshi.

== Preservation ==
The oldest Art Deco precinct in the city lies along the western boundary of Oval Maidan in Fort, Mumbai. Presence of administrative buildings, educational institutions, research institutions and cultural spaces along with clusters of residential buildings encourages the local (and global) population to engage with its built heritage.

This has led to the creation of various citizen groups who actively participate in safeguarding these built resources for the future generation like Urban Design Research Institute, NAGAR, The Oval Trust, Art Deco Mumbai and Nariman Point Churchgate Citizens' Association, to name a few. One of the significant steps taken by these groups and other professionals have been to petition to secure UNESCO World Heritage Site status. This petition in the form of nomination was successfully adopted during the 42nd Session of the World Heritage Committee and the site "Victorian Gothic and Art Deco Ensemble of Mumbai" was inscribed as a World Heritage Site on 30 June 2018 in Manama, Bahrain.

Oval Maidan (the historic cricket grounds) attracts locals to play cricket on the grounds during holidays and the weekend. Closeness to Marine Drive (one of the largest open spaces in the city) also attracts many tourist and locals to enjoy the view and breeze along the art deco promenade.

== See also ==
- Art Deco in Kolkata
- Karfule
