= Regal Cinema =

Art deco movie theatre in Mumbai, India

- "The Theatre Magnificent"
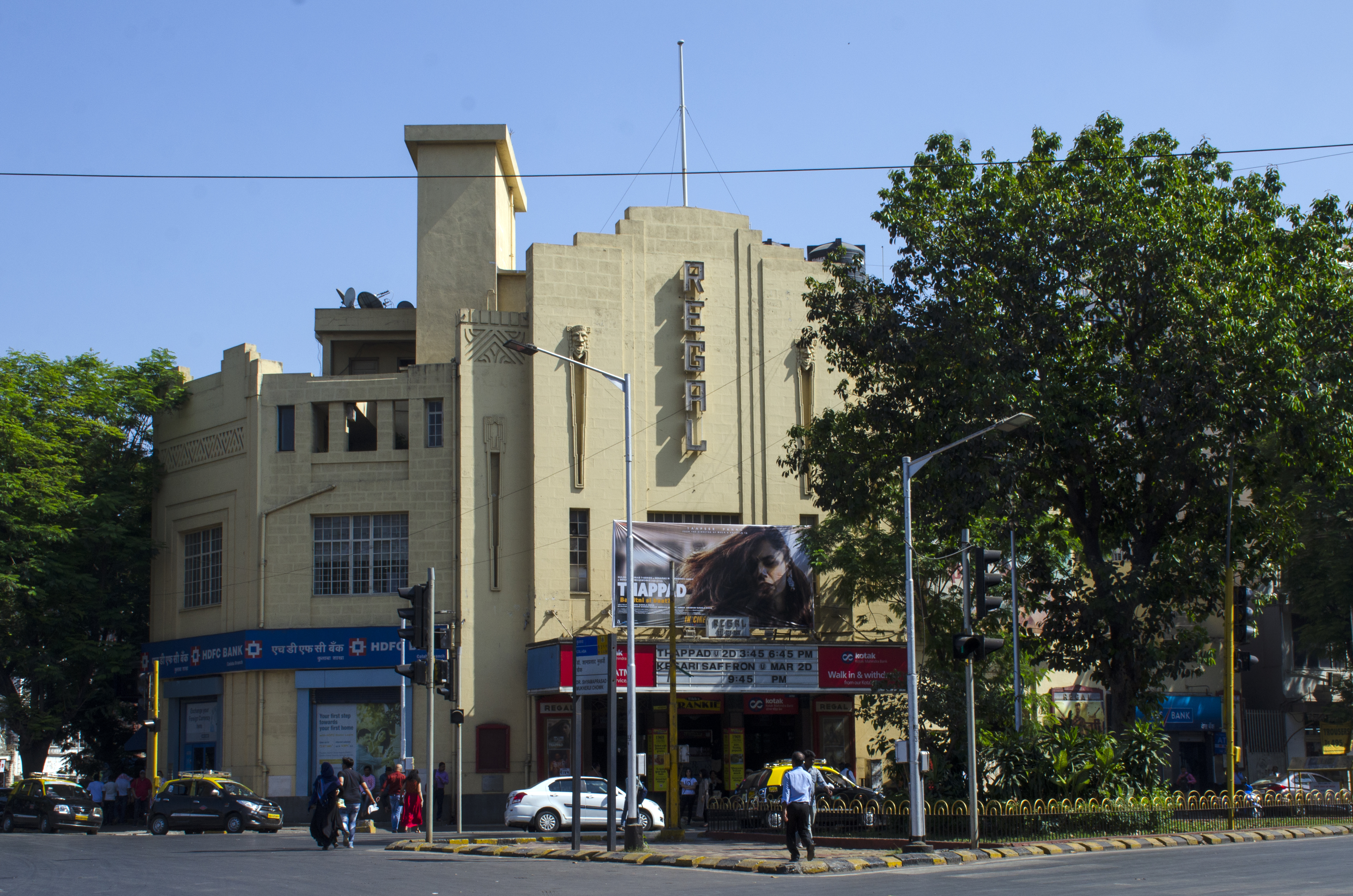
- Façade of Regal Cinema in 2020
- Interactive map of Regal Cinema
- Location: SP Mukherjee Chowk Mumbai, India
- Type: Cinema Hall
- Public transit: Chhatrapati Shivaji Terminus; Churchgate

Construction
- Opened: 1933; 93 years ago
- Renovated: 2017; 9 years ago
- Architect: Charles Stevens

UNESCO World Heritage Site
- Criteria: Cultural: (ii) (iv)
- Designated: 2018 (43rd session)
- Part of: Victorian Gothic and Art Deco Ensembles of Mumbai
- Reference no.: 1480

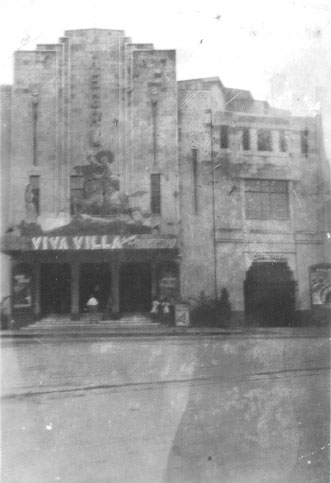
Regal Cinema, c. 1935

The Regal Cinema is an art deco movie theatre located at Colaba Causeway, in Mumbai, India. Built by Framji Sidhwa, the first film to be aired at the Regal was the Laurel and Hardy work The Devil's Brother in 1933.

According to the Limca Book of Records, it is the first air conditioned theatre of India.

== History ==
The Regal Cinema was built during the cinema boom of the 1930s during which Plaza Central, New Empire, Broadway, Eros and Metro all opened in Mumbai. Opened in 1933, Regal was designed by Charles Stevens, the son of the famous 19th century architect F. W. Stevens. Its interiors with extensive mirror-work were designed by the Czech artist Karl Schara. The main auditorium had a motif of sunrays in pale orange and jade green. Its interiors were designed to create an impression of airiness, coolness and size in harmony with the modern simplicity of the exteriors. The Regal was built completely in reinforced concrete cement (RCC), fully air conditioned, and had an underground parking lot for patrons. The elevator up from the parking area was a major innovation at the time.

The cinema was the third venue to host the Filmfare Awards night. Today, it is a multi-use building combining a cinema with shops at street level.

The Regal Cinema was the lead theatre hosting the 17th Mumbai Academy of Moving Image (MAMI), held in 2015, starting from Friday, 29 October 2015. Also, The Regal Cinema was the lead theatre hosting the 18th. Mumbai Academy of Moving Image (MAMI), held in 2016.

== See also ==
- Art Deco in Mumbai
- Eros Cinema
- Karfule
