= Shashibhusan Dasgupta =

Bengali scholar

Shashibhusan Dasgupta, Shashi Bhushan Dasgupta
- Born: 17 March 1911; Chandrahar, Bengal Presidency
- Died: 21 July 1964 (aged 53); Kolkata, West Bengal, India
- Occupations: Scholar in philosophy, languages and literature, literary critic, author, theologian

Shashibhusan Dasgupta, or Shashi Bhushan Dasgupta, Shashibhusan and Shashi Bhusan Das Gupta (17 March 1911 – 21 July 1964) was a Bengali scholar of philosophy, languages, literature (particularly Bengali literature), literary critic, author and theologian.

Dasgupta was born in Chandrahar Village in modern Barisal Division, South-Central Bangladesh. He obtained his IA from B M College, Barisal, and his BA (Hons) in Philosophy from Scottish Church College, Kolkata, West Bengal, India. His MA in Bengali Language and Literature from Calcutta University in 1935, and he subsequently joined Calcutta University's Bengali Department as a Researcher. Winning the 1937 Premchand Roychand Scholarship due to his scholarship contributions, Dasgupta was appointed a lecturer in the Bengali Department and received his PhD in that department in 1939.

Dasgupta's chief opus is the identification of Indian spiritual meditation forms and demonstration of their relationship to Tantric Buddhism, to Saivite, Sakta and Vaishnava religious philosophies, and to Bengali literature. He won the 1961 Sahitya Akademi Award for his work Bharater Shakti-Sadhana O Shakta Sahitya.

Dasgupta had authored novels, plays, poems and children's books. Some editions of his works are published posthumously or in recently updated versions, and their exact or cited titles in English depend on the language variants being transliterated.

== Bibliography ==
=== Religion ===
- Obscure Religious Cults: As a Background of Bengali Literature (1946)
- An Introduction to Tantric Buddhism (1950)
- Aspects of Indian Religious Thought, Shriradhar Kramavikash: Darshane O Sahitye (1952)
- Bhāratera śakti-sādhanā o śākta sāhitya (1960)

=== Literature ===
- Shashi Bhushan Das Gupta (Ed.), A Descriptive Catalogue Of Bengali Manuscripts Preserved In The State Library Of Cooch Behar, Published by: the Superintendent of Press, Cooch Behar State, Printed by: Nripendra Chandra Sen, At the Sabita Press, 18B, Shamacharan De Street, Calcutta, (1948)
- Bangla Sahityer Nabayug
- Bangla Sahityer Ekdik/Bāṅalā-sāhityera ekadika (1960)
- Sahityer Svarup/Sāhityera svarūpa (1983)
- Upanisader Patabhumikay Rabindramanas/Upanishadera paṭabhūmikāẏa Rabīndramānasa (1992)
- Upama Kalidasasya/Upamā Kālidāsasya (1967)
- Kavi Jatindranath O Adhunik Bangla Kavitar Pratham Paryay/Kabi Yatīndranātha o ādhunika Bāṅalā kabitāra prathama paryāẏa (1990)
- Tolstoy Gandhi O Rabindranath/Ṭalasṭaẏa, Gāndhī, Rabīndranātha (1962)
- Shilpalipi
- Bharatiya Sadhanar Aikya
- Bauddhadharma O Charyagiti/Bauddhadharma o caryāgīti (1964)
- Hābā Haladhara (1962)
- Traẏī : Bālmīki, Kalidāsa, Rabīndranātha (1989)
