= The Ballard Pier Downtown Experience Centre =

Cruise terminal in Mumbai

Coordinates: 18.9311°N 72.8435°E

The Ballard Pier Downtown Experience Centre is a cruise terminal located seaside in Mumbai's first commercial district Ballard Estate. It's constructed by Ballard Pier Private Limited and is housed on top of the Mumbai International Cruise Terminal. It was inaugurated in October 2026.

The centre has two viewing decks, named 17m and 21m, attributing to their elevation from sea level, restaurants, and shops.

== See also ==
- Ballard Pier Mole railway station
- Karfule
