= Art Deco Mumbai =

Art Deco Mumbai (ADMT) is a public charitable trust that is actively involved in spreading awareness about Mumbai's Art Deco heritage since May 2016. It is a digital initiative that uses social media (Instagram, Facebook, Twitter) and a website to showcase the built heritage. The website is the only repository of information on Art Deco in Mumbai in the public domain.

Since April 2018, Art Deco Mumbai Trust has been a member of the International Coalition of Art Deco Societies (ICADS). This membership has enabled the institution to forge partnerships that have fostered knowledge sharing, cultural and educational exchange at a global level.

The organisation (ADMT) believes that documentation is a crucial step towards enabling conservation and that transferring heritage from one generation to another is imperative. They aim to bring Art Deco heritage into Mumbai's mainstream dialogue on heritage and empower the different stakeholders to make conscious decisions.

Since its inception, ADMT has undertaken the documentation of art deco heritage in various neighbourhoods within Greater Mumbai. Through their documentation initiative, they have catalogued numerous Deco buildings in socio-culturally diverse neighbourhoods like Churchgate, Marine Drive, Mohammed Ali Road, Shivaji Park, Matunga, Chembur, and Bandra, among others. Their research initiative focuses on disseminating studies that explore social, cultural and political themes around Art Deco buildings in Mumbai, especially building work conceived by first-generation Indian architects in collaboration with homegrown contractors and independent artists.

As part of its outreach initiatives, the organisation engages with different educational and cultural institutions of local and global relevance to spread awareness amongst the youth about this 20th-century heritage. They also host public lectures that enable city residents to broaden their understanding of Mumbai's Art Deco movement.

From October 2017 to January 2018, the organisation was commissioned by Mumbai Mirror, a single edition local newspaper, to author a weekly column "Have a Decco" aimed at exploring the relationship of the city with the architectural style (Art Deco) across neighbourhoods.

On the occasion of International Day for Monuments and Sites 2020, Art Deco Mumbai came online on Google Arts & Culture platform through a new partnership between Google and the Trust.

For over a decade, trustees of ADMT have led stakeholder representation in the preparation of the UNESCO Nomination of "The Victorian Gothic and Art Deco Ensembles of Mumbai" successfully inscribed as a World Heritage Site on 30 June 2018. This nomination aims to safeguard a total of 94 buildings of which 76 are Art Deco. The organisation has incorporated hashtags #WHSOval and #WHSMarineDrive in their website inventory to ease search related to these Art Deco buildings. Art Deco Mumbai Trust has also designed a pocket-sized map of the UNESCO World Heritage Site that celebrates the architectural legacy of the city in a visually engaging and informative manner. Additionally, ADMT, along with the other stakeholders of Federation of Residents Trusts have produced a short film that spreads awareness about the World Heritage Site and the unique relationship these spaces share with the citizens of Mumbai.
