= Ballard Estate =

- Business district
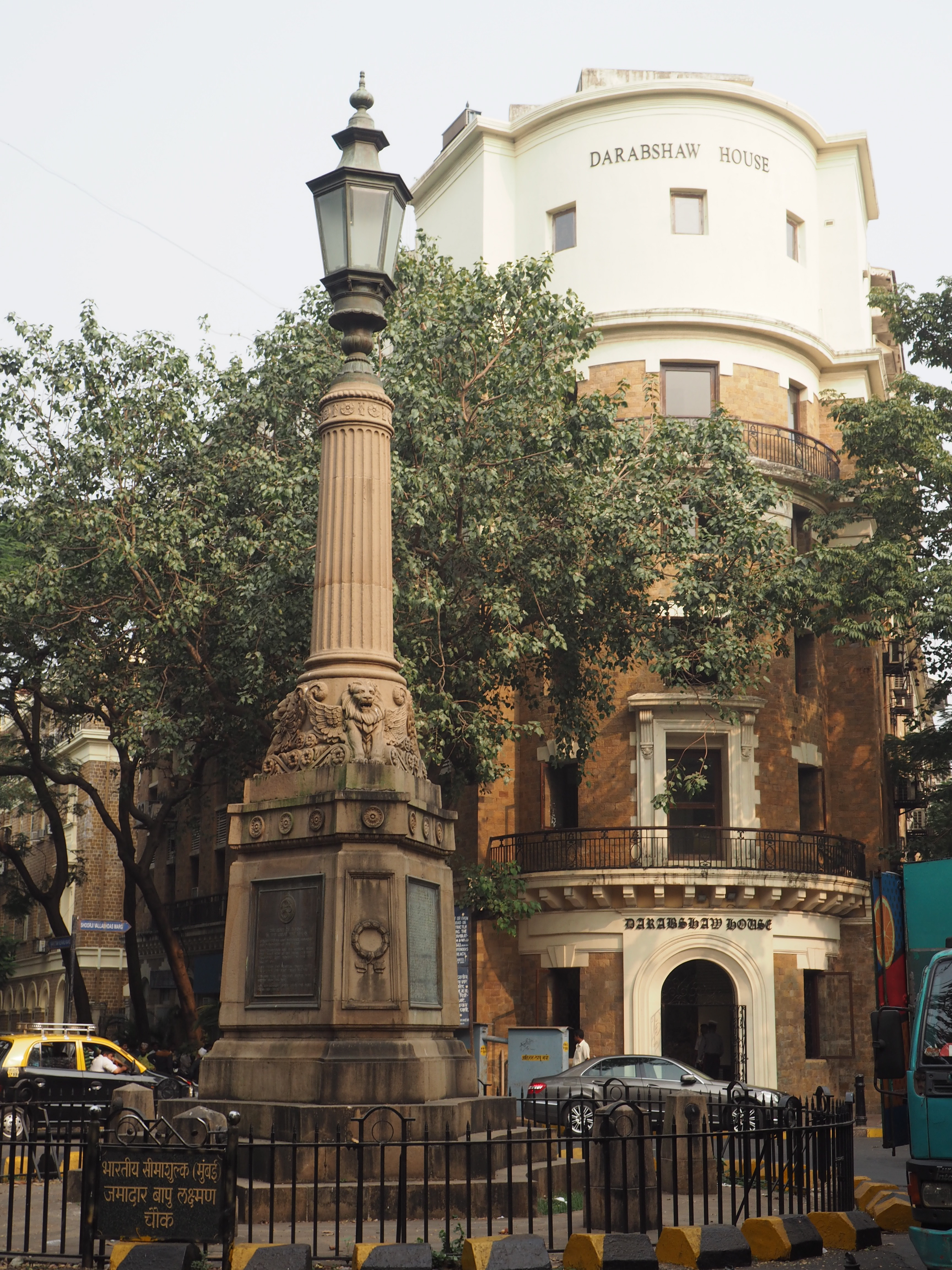
- Port Trust War Memorial in Ballard Estate
- Interactive map of Ballard Estate
- Coordinates: 18°56′10.3″N 72°50′17.9″E
- Country: India
- State: Maharashtra
- District: Mumbai City
- Metro: Mumbai
- Created: 1918; 108 years ago
- Named for: Colonel J. A. Ballard

Government
  - Type: Municipal Corporation
  - Body: Brihanmumbai Municipal Corporation (MCGM)

Languages
  - Official: Marathi
- Time zone: UTC+5:30 (IST)
- PIN: 400001
- Lok Sabha constituency: Mumbai South
- Public transit: Chhatrapati Shivaji Terminus; Churchgate

The Ballard Estate business district is situated in the financial district of Fort. Located between Chhatrapati Shivaji Maharaj Terminus and Fort in South Mumbai, it hosts the offices of shipping companies and the headquarters of the Mumbai Port Trust at the Port House. It has the Reliance Centre, many mid-priced hotels and a noted Irani cafe, Britannia.

== Overview ==
The Bombay Port Trust reclaimed 22 acres (89,000 m^{2}) of land at Ballard Estate between 1914 and 1918, using material excavated from the Alexandra Docks for filling. Ballard Estate was named for lieutenant general J. A. Ballard, a founder of the Mumbai Port Trust, which constructed the port and Ballard Pier. George Wittet designed the buildings for the business district, imposing a uniformity of style and design through the use of European Renaissance facades. As it is built in the Edwardian neoclassical architecture, it has a "London feel" to it and is often referred to as "London-like" by the locals.

A plan to relieve congestion, conserve the structures and enliven the historic area under the auspices of the Heritage Conservation Committee has been proposed.

In recent years, Ballard Estate has attracted luxury retail and art spaces, adding to its appeal as a destination for shoppers and art enthusiasts. Notable additions include the textile and fashion store Tilfi, known for its Varanasi-inspired craftsmanship, and designer Tarun Tahiliani’s boutique, offering high-end Indian fashion. The area also features art galleries such as Galerie ISA, which presents contemporary international art, and IF.BE, a multidisciplinary space housed in a renovated ice factory. These new establishments contribute to Ballard Estate’s blend of cultural, historical, and luxury offerings.

== Images ==
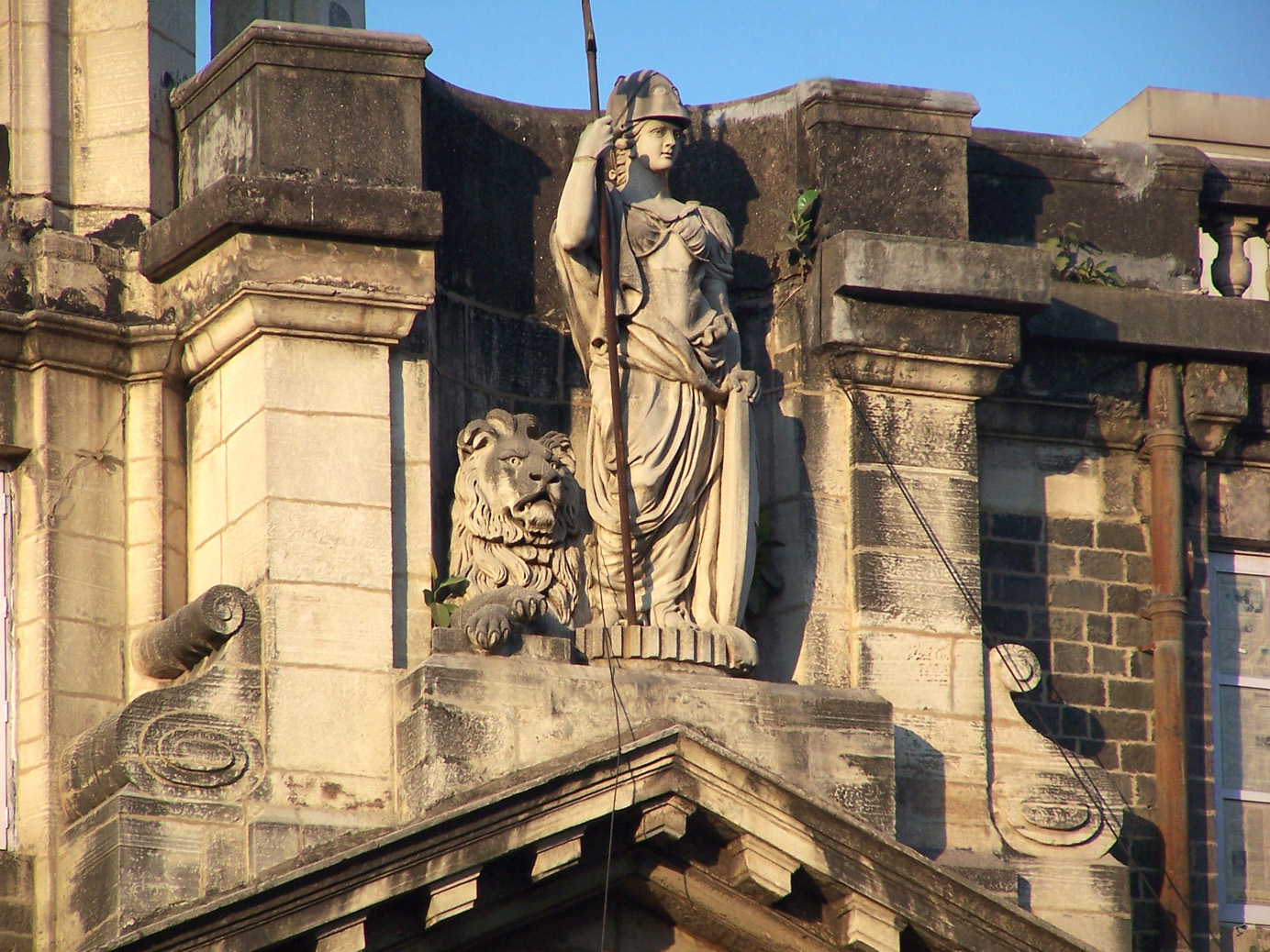
Ballard Estate building detail

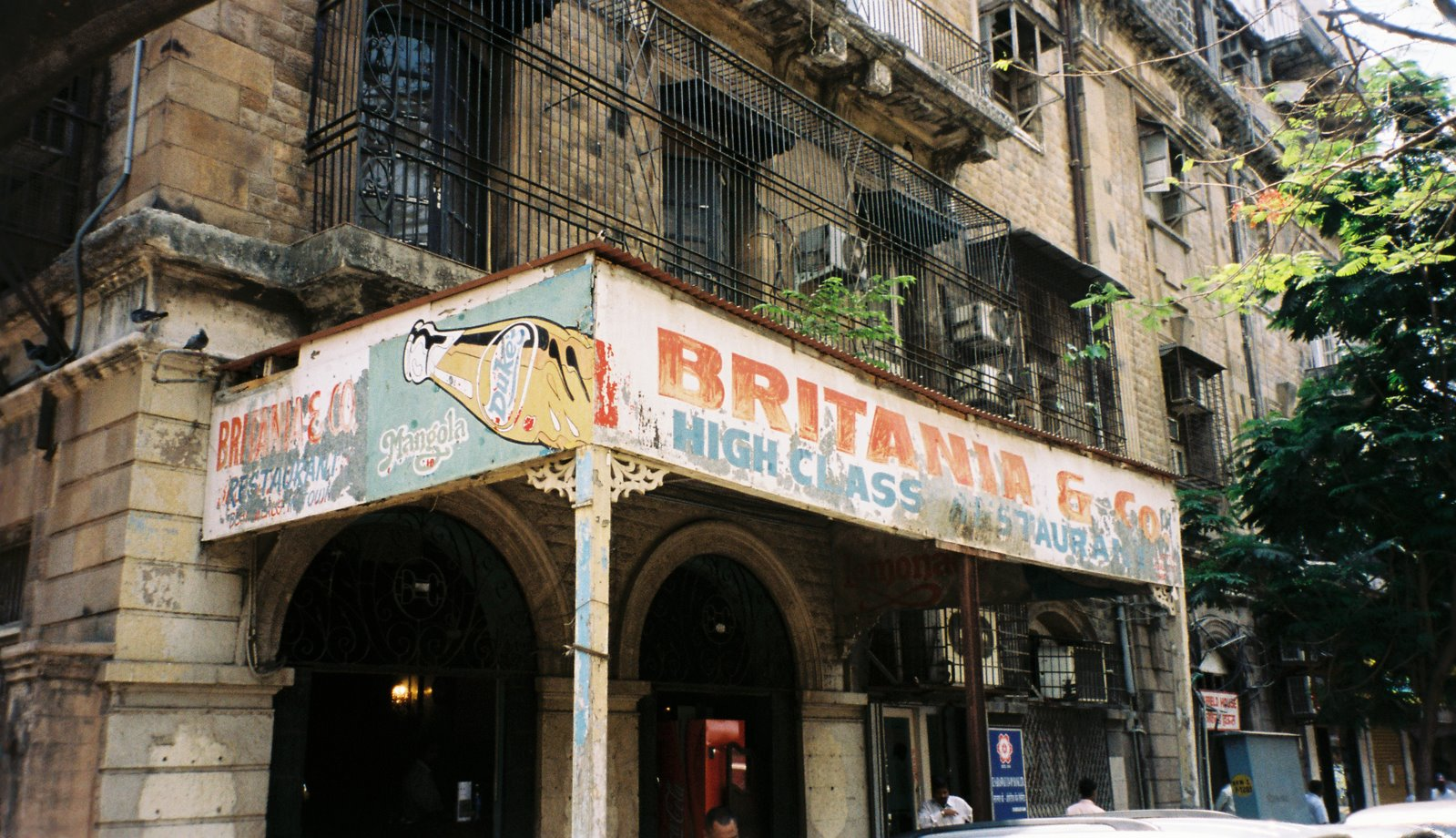
Britannia cafe, an Irani cafe at Ballard Estate

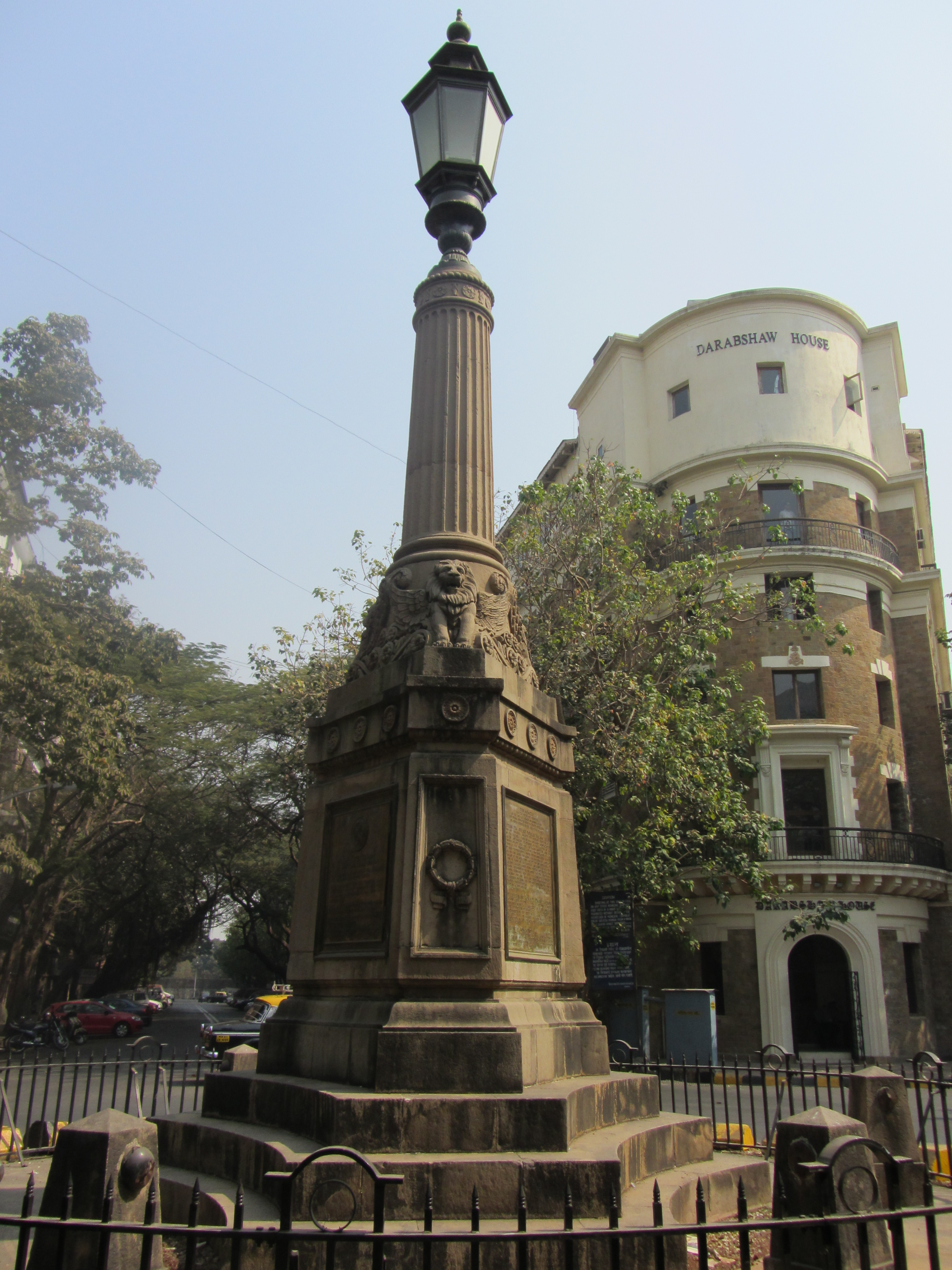
Port Trust World War I memorial

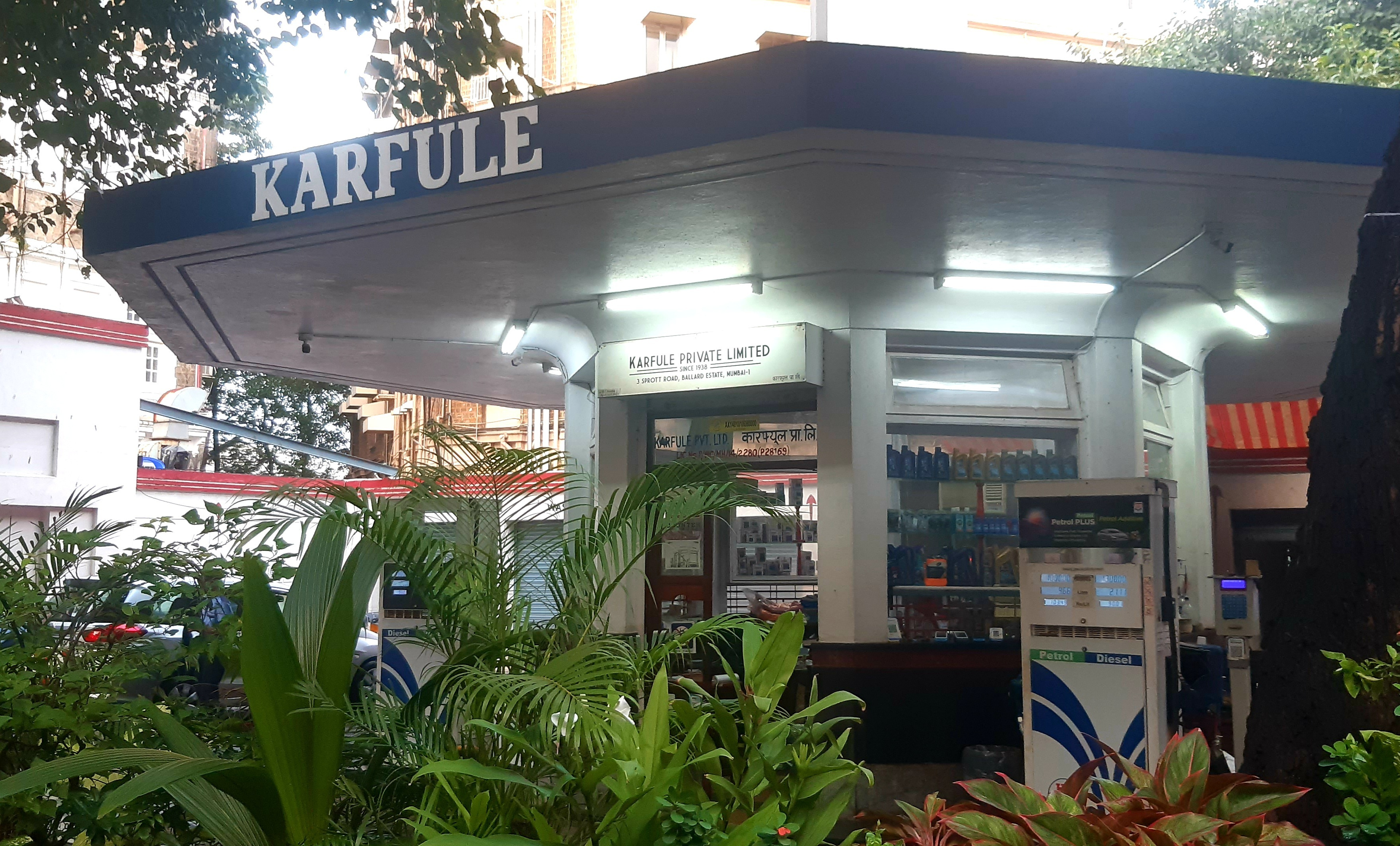
Karfule fuel station

== See also ==
- The Ballard Pier Downtown Experience Centre
- Karfule
