= Art Deco in Kolkata =

Art Deco architecture in Kolkata

The Art Deco in Kolkata, India is a prominent architectural style which can be found across the city, most notably in the southern parts of the metropolis. The style can be traced back to the 1930s "with the use of Portland cement and with geometrical articulation in plan and cosmetic decorative treatment including perforated concrete grill-work on a simple elevation (façade)." Although Kolkata is notable for its colonial-style (Victorian, neo-classical, gothic revival) and vernacular-style (mansions constructed by the Bengali elites) buildings, the emphasis on Art Deco buildings while discussing the architectural history of the city is often overlooked. This is in exception to the few prominent art deco buildings constructed during the colonial period in the first half of the twentieth century—about which enough has been written. Despite art deco being so prominent in the latter half of the twentieth century insofar as entire neighbourhoods—architecturally speaking—appeared to be adaptations of one style, it was not paid enough attention up until the twenty-first century when many such buildings (mostly residential homes) started to be either severely neglected or demolished because of lack of architectural and historical awareness and preservation efforts.

Some characteristic features of Art Deco buildings in Kolkata are a blend of traditional style with European provenances: "semi-circular balconies, a long vertical strip comprising glass panes for the stairwell, porthole-shaped windows, sunrise motifs on grilles and gates," cast iron railings, etc. Prominent Kolkata neighbourhoods where one can witness Art Deco buildings are Gariahat Road, Tollygunge, Southern Avenue, Beliaghata, etc.

Art Deco architecture is not a direct successor of the Art Nouveau style in Kolkata.

== Background ==
Historically, Art Deco emerged in Europe, and Chicago is credited to be the first city in the world wherein the architectural style flourished with its skyscrapers. The Home Insurance Building constructed in 1884 with structural metal in its frame is a notable example. New York City made the art deco style prominent by constructing various skyscrapers (Chrysler Building, American Radiator Building), Miami became the largest city in the world housing Art Deco architecture, and Mumbai in India has been ranked as the second largest city with art deco buildings. The architectural style credited to be a blend of many elements does not share the same history in Kolkata as the above-mentioned cities.

The nomenclature 'Art Deco' itself does not have any definitive origin and is often alluded to the Swiss-French architect Le Corbusier who used the phrase while writing for his journal L'Esprit Nouveau regarding the International Exhibition of Modern Decorative and Industrial Arts held in Paris 1925. Art Deco may have been named after this global exhibition. In the context of Kolkata, there are many reasons why the architectural style was never paid as much attention as it did in other cities in the world. Firstly, in the absence of the Indo-Saracenic style in Kolkata (as the British did not see its relevance in the city), the British promoted neo-classical architecture. Whereas the wealthy Bengali landowners constructed buildings with huge courtyards and structures which may be seen as resistance to the imperial architectural styles. Secondly, there was "retaliation against the proliferation of art deco architecture in India during this time and the rise of modernism in Europe", which can be seen through the lenses of the Modern Indian Architecture Movement and the work of Bengali architect Sris Chandra Chatterjee, one of the pioneers of the movement. This movement aimed to find a more appropriate architecture catering to the Indian sentiment for buildings constructed by Indians.

The first few art deco buildings in Kolkata were mostly either office buildings, private houses, or movie theatres. The Metro Cinema, a private structure developed by "Metro-Goldwyn-Mayer to promote its movies opened to the public in 1934, designed by New York-based, Scottish-born architect Thomas W. Lamb." This Art Deco building would later become one of the most significant examples of the style in the city. Other prominent buildings include the Reid House on Red Cross Place and the Laha Paint House in Bow Barracks.

However, it was not until the 1960s that art deco buildings gained a stronghold in the city. This is because after the Partition of Bengal in 1947 and with various refugee families settling in the southern parts of the city, many individuals preferred to build houses styled after the Metro Cinema Hall. These were middle-class individuals with access and aspirations such as doctors, lawyers, civil servants, etc. who lost their ancestral houses due to the Partition of India. With limited spaces as opposed to the huge mansions of wealthy individuals in northern Kolkata, these individuals would ask civil engineers (and not architects because they would charge 2-3% of construction cost, unlike in other cities) to file building plans and construct houses in a similar fashion as the Metro Cinema. Therefore, many such residential houses came to be known as "metro-style houses." These ordinary residential homes were compact and of a more contemporary architectural style as opposed to the older style of houses in north Kolkata. Many of its residents did not even know about the art deco style in Europe and their homes boasted a blend of many styles: from traditional features to European characteristics of the Art Deco. One may even claim that this was Kolkata's interpretation of art deco which may be referred to as 'indie-deco'. The second-generation residents of these houses, statistically in many instances, often moved out or migrated to other regions for better livelihood prospects. Thus many such houses by the turn of the century started to disappear with failure of maintenance or the old inhabitants finding it easier to give their property to developers who would construct apartment buildings to house many more families, a demand which can be seen against the backdrop of increasing urbanisation and modernisation of cities in the global South.

While the social and historical conditions under which art deco residential houses in Kolkata emerged can be traced back to the mid-twentieth century, its decay and negligence as compared to other cities in the world can be attributed towards a lack of awareness regarding this more colloquial form of Art Deco housing structures prevalent in the region.

== Preservation efforts ==
Of late, there have been various campaigns to preserve the art deco houses in Kolkata, most notably the author Amit Chaudhuri's 2015 movement called the "Calcutta Architectural Legacies." There are other private citizen's projects as well launched on social media platforms to document and preserve Kolkata's dying heritage houses (including art deco buildings) such as the 'Calcutta Houses' and 'Art Deco Calcutta'. The 'Calcutta Heritage Collective' is also a notable restoration initiative comprising prominent civil society individuals of Kolkata.

== See also ==
- Architecture of Bengal
- Art Deco in Mumbai
- Art Nouveau
