= Rajabai Clock Tower =

Rajabai Tower
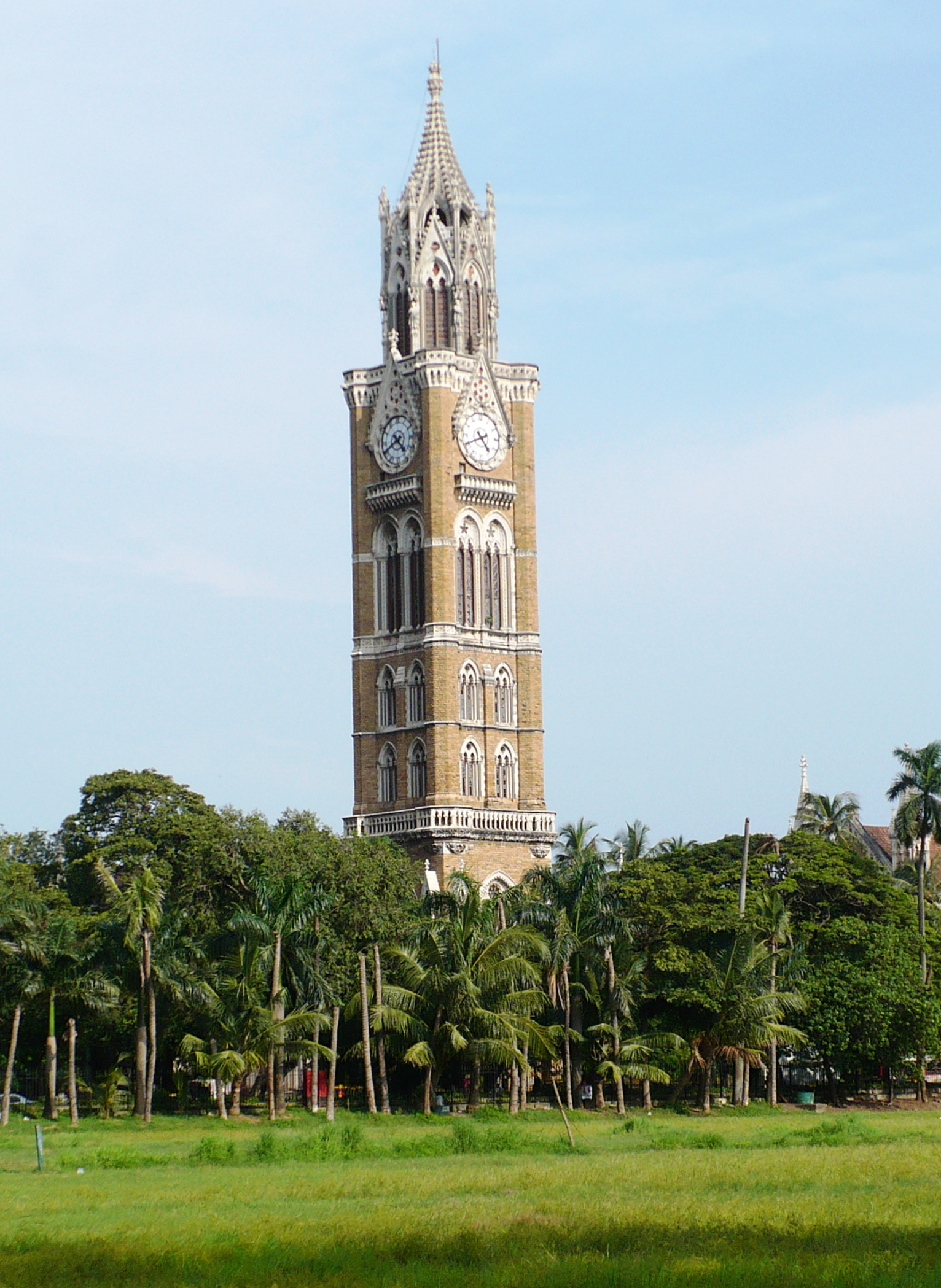
- Rajabai Clock Tower in 2009
- Interactive map of the Rajabai Tower area

General information
- Type: Clock tower
- Architectural style: Venetian and Gothic
- Location: Mumbai, India
- Coordinates: 18.92964°N 72.82999°E
- Construction started: 1 March 1869; 157 years ago
- Completed: November 1878; 147 years ago
- Cost: ₹ 550,000
- Client: Maharashtra

Height
- Height: 280 feet (85 m)

Technical details
- Structural system: Buff coloured Kurla stone

Design and construction
- Architect: Sir George Gilbert Scott

Other information
- Public transit: Chhatrapati Shivaji Terminus; Churchgate

UNESCO World Heritage Site
- Criteria: Cultural: (ii) (iv)
- Designated: 2018 (43rd session)
- Part of: Victorian Gothic and Art Deco Ensembles of Mumbai
- Reference no.: 1480

The Rajabai Tower is a clock tower in Mumbai, India. It is in the confines of the Fort campus of the University of Mumbai. It stands at a height of 85 m (280 ft or 25 storeys). The tower is part of The Victorian and Art Deco Ensemble of Mumbai, which was added to the list of World Heritage Sites in 2018.

== History ==
The Rajabai Clock Tower was designed by Sir George Gilbert Scott, an English architect. He modeled it on Big Ben in London. The foundation stone was laid on 1 March 1869 and construction was completed in November 1878. The total cost of construction came to ₹550,000, a large amount of money for the time period. A portion of the total cost of construction was donated by Premchand Roychand Jain, a wealthy broker who founded the Bombay Stock Exchange on the condition that the tower be named after his mother Rajabai.

Premchand Roychand's mother was blind and as a staunch follower of Jain religion, she was supposed to consume her dinner before the evening. Legend says that the evening bell of the tower helped her to know the time without anyone's help.

The tower was closed to the public after it became a frequent spot for those attempting suicide.

== Structure ==
The tower was built in a fusion of Venetian and Gothic styles. It is built out of the locally available buff coloured Kurla stone. The tower has one of the best stained glass windows in the city.

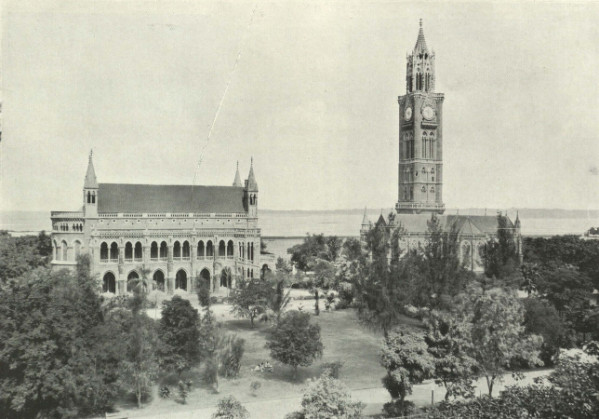
Council Building of the University of Mumbai in India, around 1905

The ground floor has two side rooms, each measuring 56 ft × 27.5 ft (17.1 m × 8.4 m). The tower forms a carriage porch 2.4 m^{2} (26 ft^{2}), and a spiral staircase vestibule of 2.6 m^{2} (28 ft^{2}). The Tower, over the carriage porch, has a square form up to the gallery at the top of the first level which is at a height of 68 feet (21 m) from the ground. The form changes from a square to an octagon and the height from this gallery to the top of the tower is 118 feet (36 m) and the third stage to the top of the finial is 94 feet (29 m), thus making a total height of 280 feet (85 m).

During its time, it was the tallest structure in the city of Mumbai.

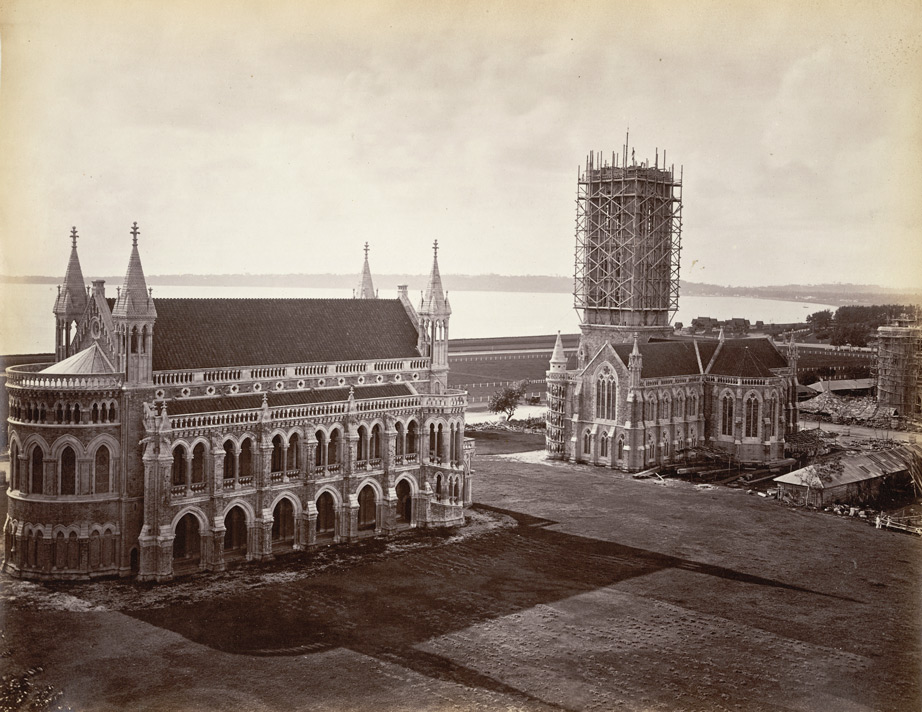
A file photo of University of Mumbai taken in the 1870s. Rajabai Clock Tower here seen shrouded in scaffolding was completed in 1878

== Chimes ==
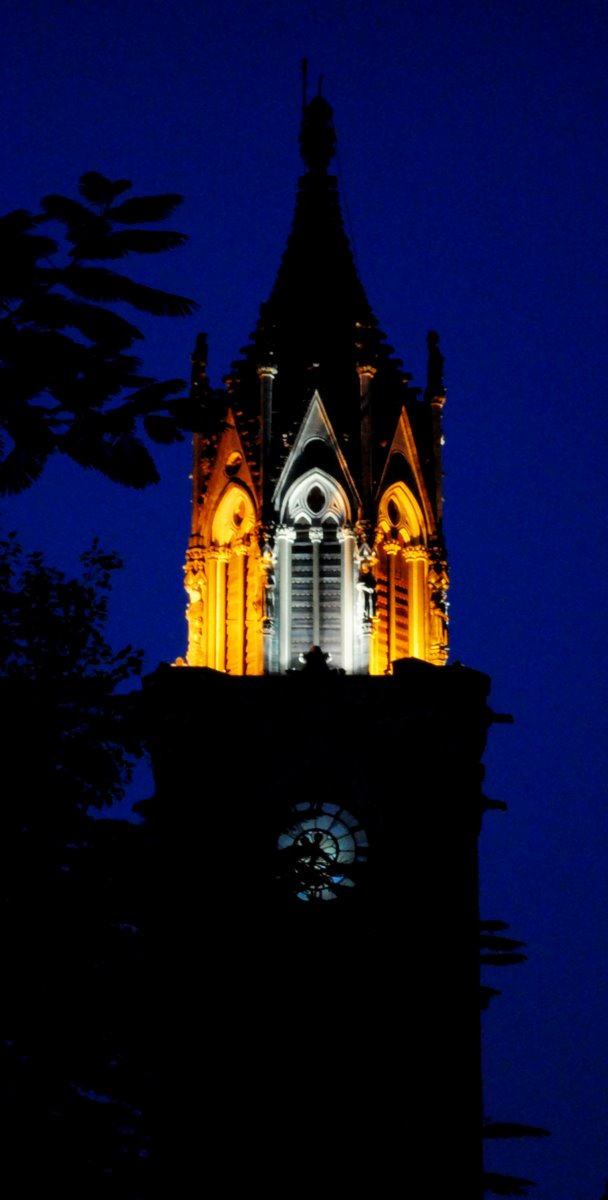
Rajabai Clock Tower, brightly lit during the night.

During the 19th century it played the tunes of "Home! Sweet Home!" and "A Handel Symphony", out of a total of sixteen tunes, which changed four times a day. It currently chimes only one tune every 15 minutes.

== Restoration ==
From October 2013 to 11 May 2015, the tower underwent restoration work under the observation of Anita Garware (Heritage Society), Rajan Welukar (Vice-Chancellor; University of Mumbai) and N Chandrasekar (CEO, Tata Consultancy Services). It reopened in March 2015 after renovation.

The restoration efforts were recognised by UNESCO in 2018 when the Library and the Rajabai Clock Tower received the UNESCO Asia-Pacific Award for Cultural Heritage Conservation.
