= New India Assurance Building =

Coordinates: 18.9304161°N 72.8316503°E

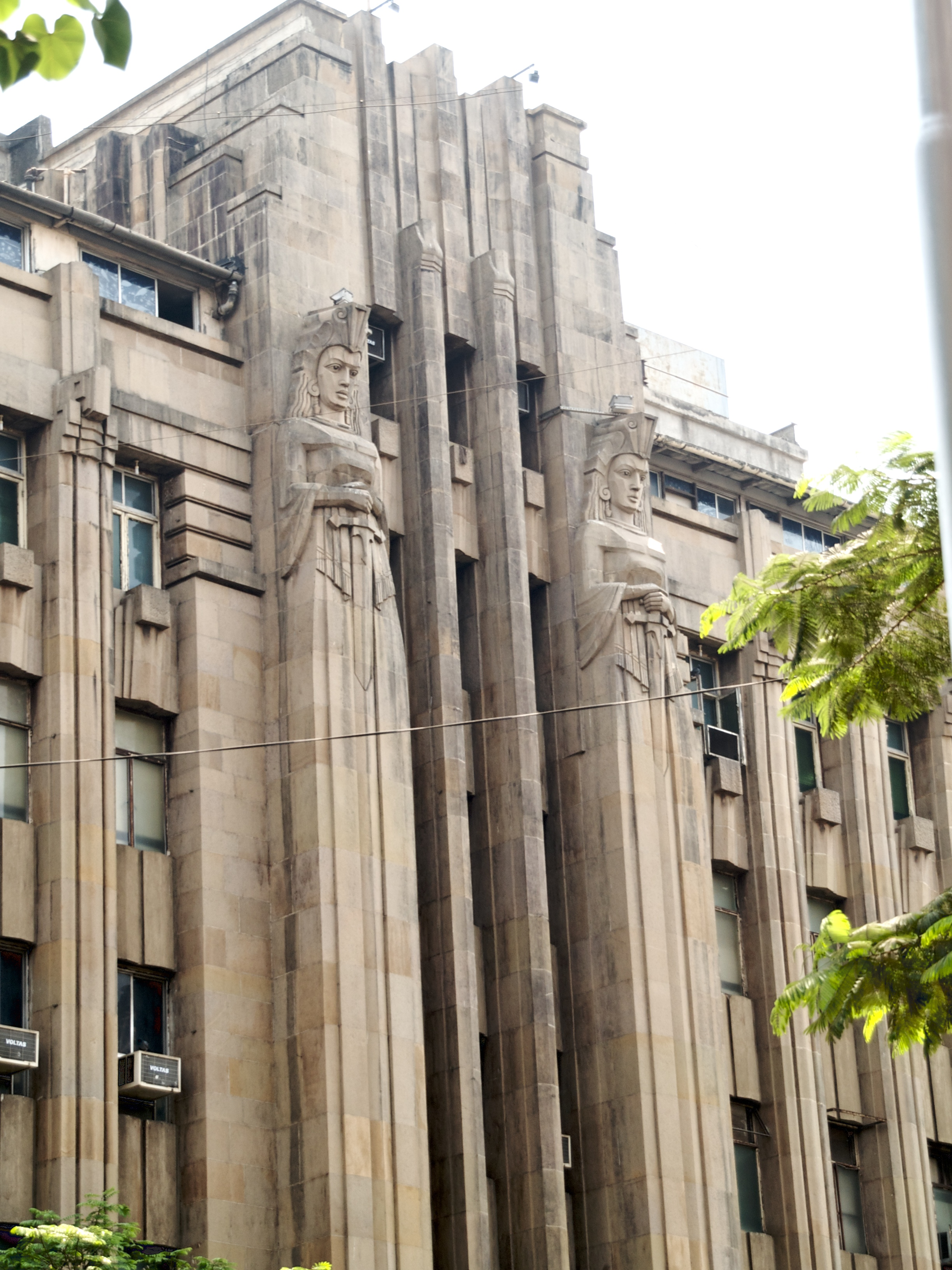
- New India Assurance Building in 2008

General information
- Type: Office
- Architectural style: Art Deco
- Location: Mumbai, India
- Construction started: 1935; 91 years ago
- Completed: 1937; 89 years ago
- Client: Maharashtra

Technical details
- Floor count: 6

Design and construction
- Architecture firm: Master, Sathe and Bhuta

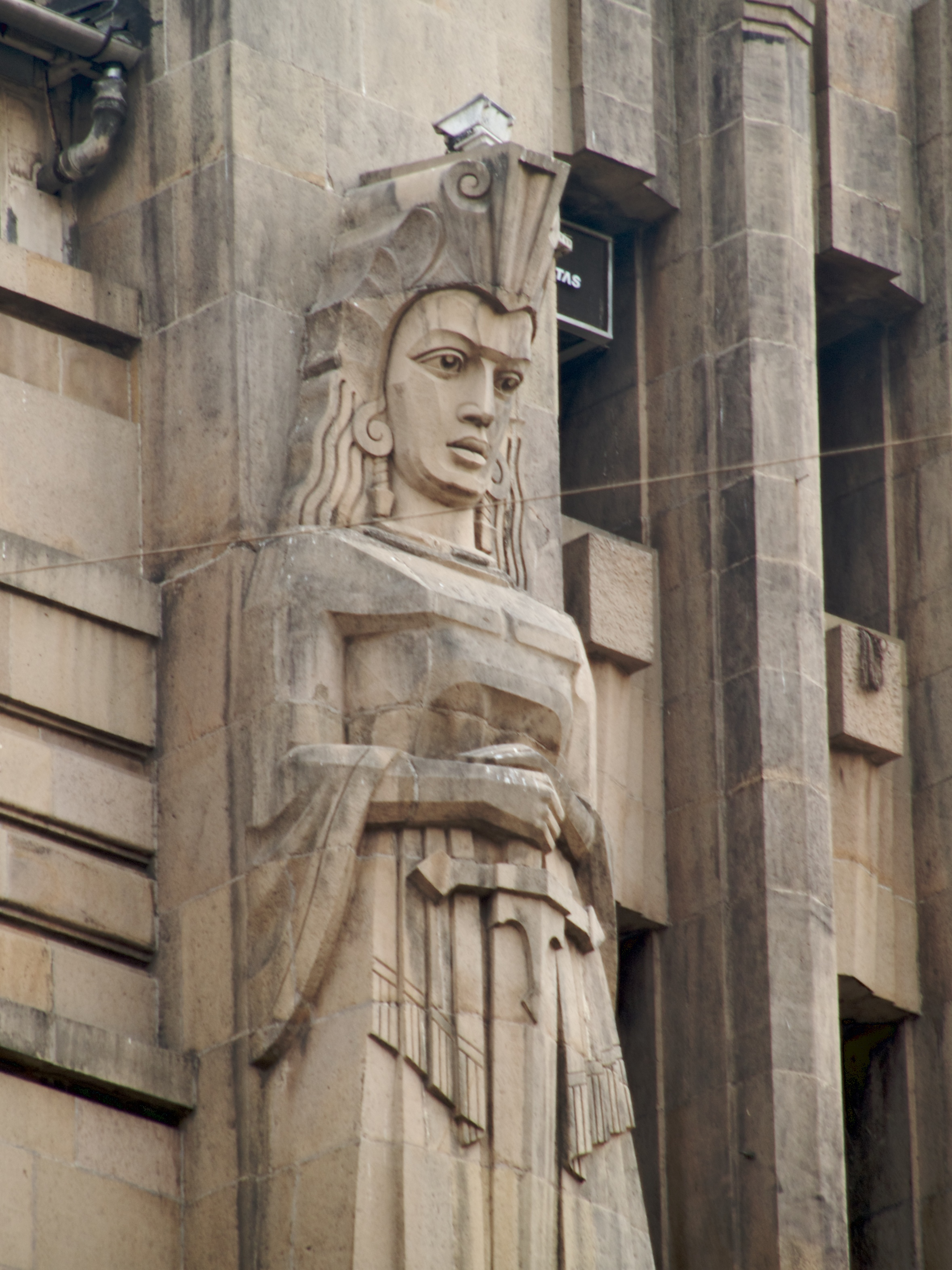
Detailed reliefs on the facade

The New India Assurance Building is an Art Deco office building made of reinforced concrete and designed by Master, Sathe and Bhuta, with artistic designer N. G. Pansare. It was constructed in 1937 in Mumbai, India for New India Assurance Co. Ltd., an Indian insurance company which was founded by Sir Dorabji Tata in 1919.

The building stands on Mahatma Gandhi Road in the Fort neighborhood of south Mumbai, close to Flora Fountain and other 1930s commercial office blocks in the historic business district. It has been noted in surveys of Mumbai's inter-war commercial architecture as a prominent landmark of the city's Art Deco business streets along Mahatma Gandhi Road and the adjoining D. N. Road–Sir Pherozeshah Mehta Road axis.

The New India Assurance Building is frequently cited as one of the key commercial examples within Mumbai's Victorian Gothic and Art Deco Ensembles, which were inscribed on the World Heritage List by UNESCO in 2018. Contemporary overviews of Indian Art Deco architecture describe the building as a representative Indo-Deco office block, noting its reinforced-concrete construction, vertical emphasis and sculptural programme as characteristic of Bombay's adaptation of the style for Indian-owned financial institutions.

== Architecture ==
The New India Assurance building's design has been described as Indo-Deco, an architecture style that combines Indian design elements with Art Deco. The building's architectural style combines modern art deco features with a modified classicism, evidenced in the strong vertical ribs of the façade that give the building a monumental appearance, making it seem larger than it is in reality.

The entrance is flanked by bas-reliefs featuring women in saris and men in traditional dhoti and turbans, working in fields and in factories.

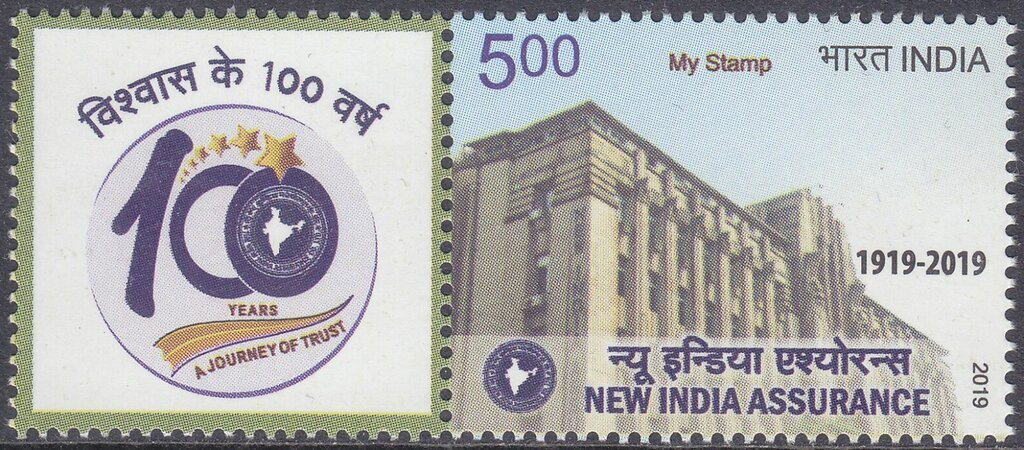
The New India Assurance Building featured on the New India Assurance Centenary stamp

Included in the design was a modern forced air-cooling system with centralized ductwork. Projecting surfaces on the eastern and western sides protect windows from the sun. To deal with potential power failures, the windows were constructed to open and close.

Commentators on Mumbai's Art Deco heritage have highlighted the building's sculptural program, designed by N. G. Pansare, as an example of a "swadeshi moderne" aesthetic that combined contemporary corporate imagery with references to India's independence movement. Large relief panels depicting agricultural and industrial labor, together with smaller allegorical figures carrying motifs of knowledge, prosperity and freedom, have been interpreted as visual expressions of self-reliance and modernity for an Indian-owned insurance company in the late colonial period.

== Heritage status ==
The New India Assurance Building is listed as a Grade II-A heritage structure on the Municipal Corporation of Greater Mumbai's official heritage list, under serial number 174 for Mahatma Gandhi Road in the Fort area.
