= Eros Cinema =

Cinema in Mumbai, India

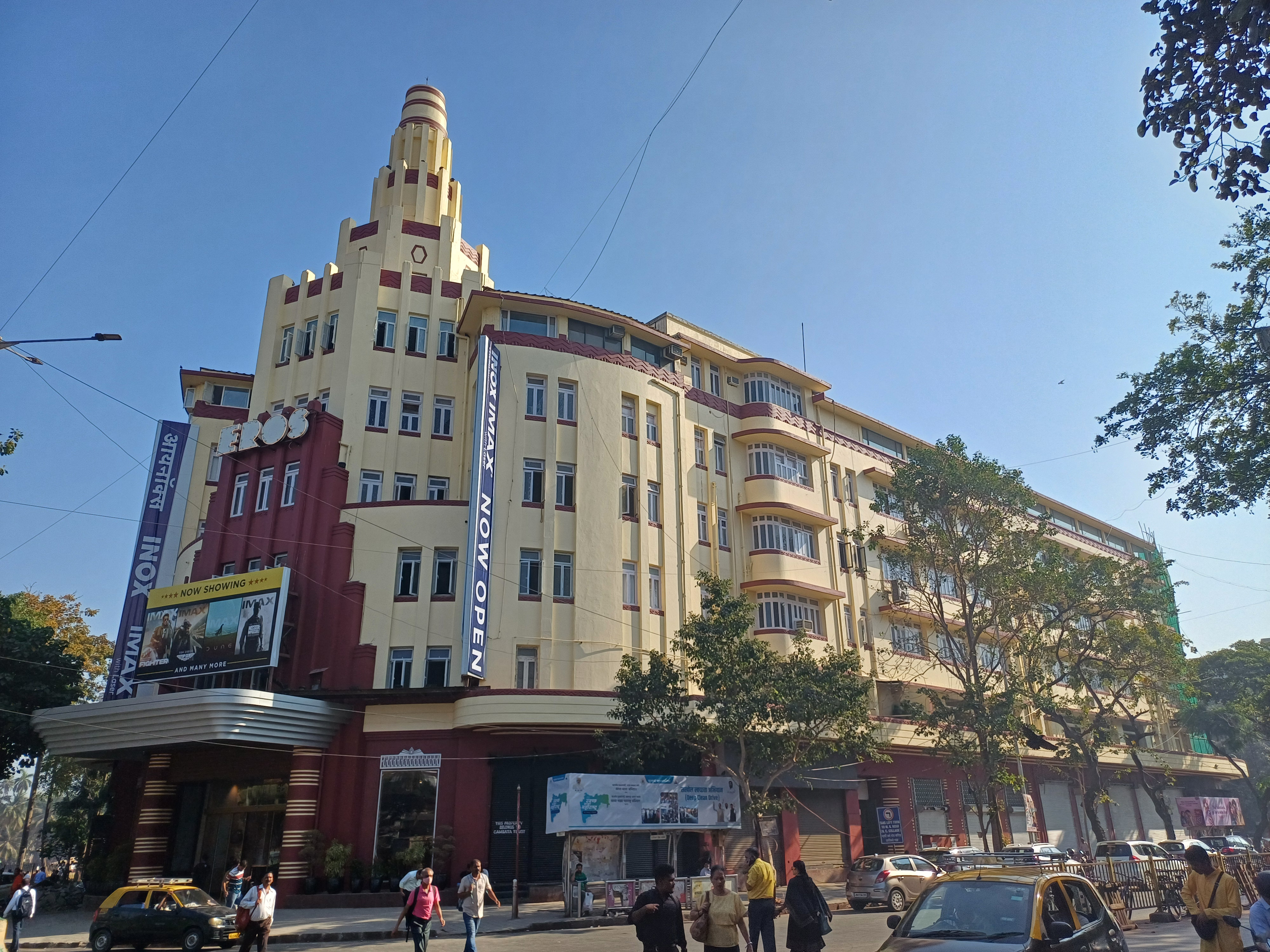
- Eros Cinema in Cambata Building, post restoration, in 2024
- Interactive map of Eros Cinema
- Location: Maharshi Karve Rd, Churchgate, Mumbai
- Owner: Eros Trust, Cambata Family
- Capacity: 305 (2024–present)
- Type: Cinema Hall
- Public transit: Churchgate

Construction
- Opened: 1938; 88 years ago
- Closed: 2016; 10 years ago
- Reopened: 2024
- Architect: Shorabji Bhedwar

UNESCO World Heritage Site
- Criteria: Cultural: (ii) (iv)
- Designated: 2018 (43rd session)
- Part of: Victorian Gothic and Art Deco Ensembles of Mumbai
- Reference no.: 1480

The Eros Cinema is an Art Deco style cinema theatre located in Cambata Building at Churchgate, Mumbai, India. It has a seating capacity of 1,204 people per show.

The architect Shorabji Bhedwar designed the Streamline Moderne building, marking the beginning of Back Bay reclamation in early 1938.

== History ==
Eros Cinema was commissioned in 1935 by the Parsi businessman Shiavax Cawasji Cambata in 1935 and its foundation was laid in the same year. Construction of the building on the then-newly reclaimed Back Bay plot housing shops and other businesses, apart from the cinema, took about two and a half years to complete. The cinema opened to the public on 10 February 1938.

== Design ==
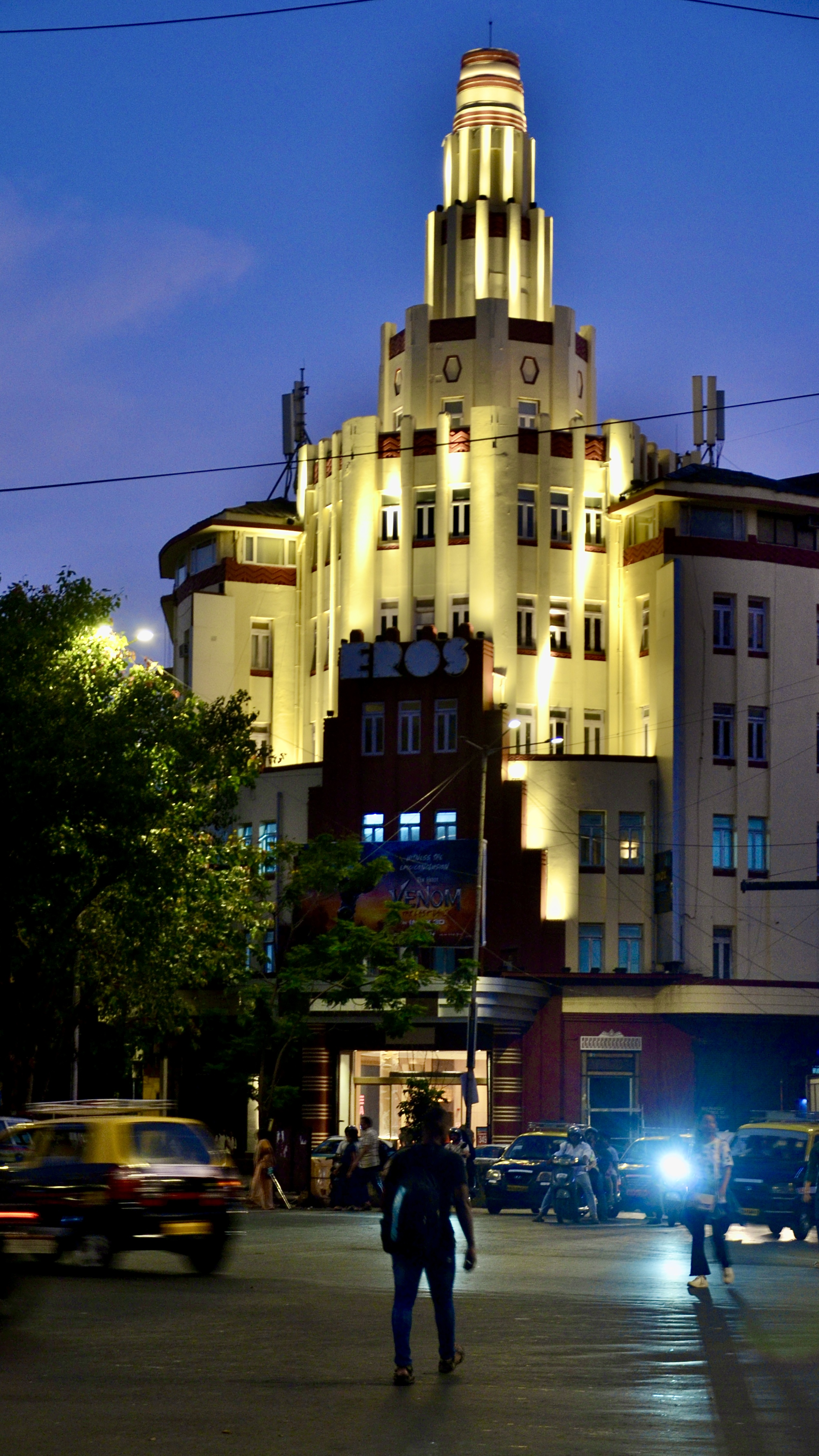
At night

Partially faced with red Agra sandstone, the building is painted cream. The two wings of this Art Deco building meet up in a central block. The foyer is in white and black marble with touches of gold. Marble staircases with chromium handrails lead up to the upper floor. The murals are in muted colours depicting Indian architectures.

The auditorium was decorated with cloud patterns on the walls, with the lower half decorated in black marble, with a pair of large relief sculptures running the length of the lower floor. The left sculpture featured a theme about the construction of a film set, while the right sculpture featured themes revolving around the actors shooting a film.

The Proscenium arch had a large relief sculpture of an orchestra playing, and a pair of large columns with gold stripes flanking the stage. Theatre organ chambers were incorporated into the original auditorium, but no pipe organ was confirmed to be installed.

When the theatre was converted to an IMAX, all traces of the original auditorium were removed including the balcony, with only the large relief sculptures flanking the sides being incorporated. The new floor has also been made steeper to accommodate the IMAX screen, consequently resulting in the sculptures sitting much higher.

== Importance ==
The building is part of Victorian Gothic and Art Deco Ensembles of Mumbai, which was added to the list of World Heritage Site in 2018.

== Renovation ==
The Eros Cinema closed in April 2017. The Cambata Building which housed the theatre was sealed by the City Collector due to legal disputes but was later unsealed on the order of Bombay High Court, but the screening at the theatre was not resumed.

However, the Cambata Family who owned the building were in talks with other cinema businesses to revive the Eros Cinema with some renovation and changes to the building without harming the heritage structure. The restoration and renovation of the cinema was undertaken by conservation architect Kirtida Unwalla as well as architect Hafeez Contractor and his team. Eventually, new premises of the cinema with a 1,300 seater theatre and 300 seater IMAX screen was reopened in February 2024.
