= Victorian Gothic and Art Deco Ensembles of Mumbai =

Art Deco & Victorian Architecture in Mumbai, India

UNESCO World Heritage Site
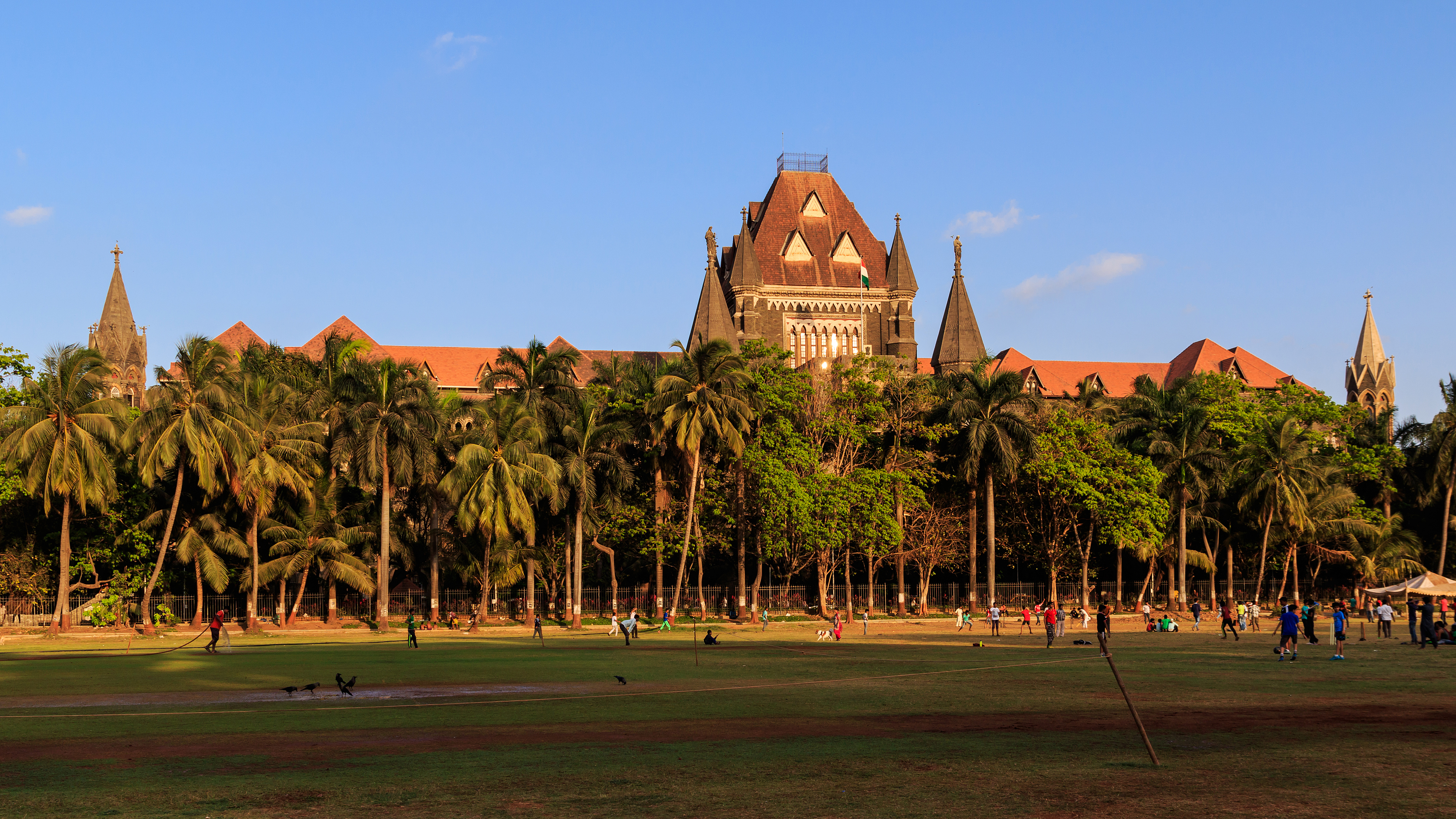
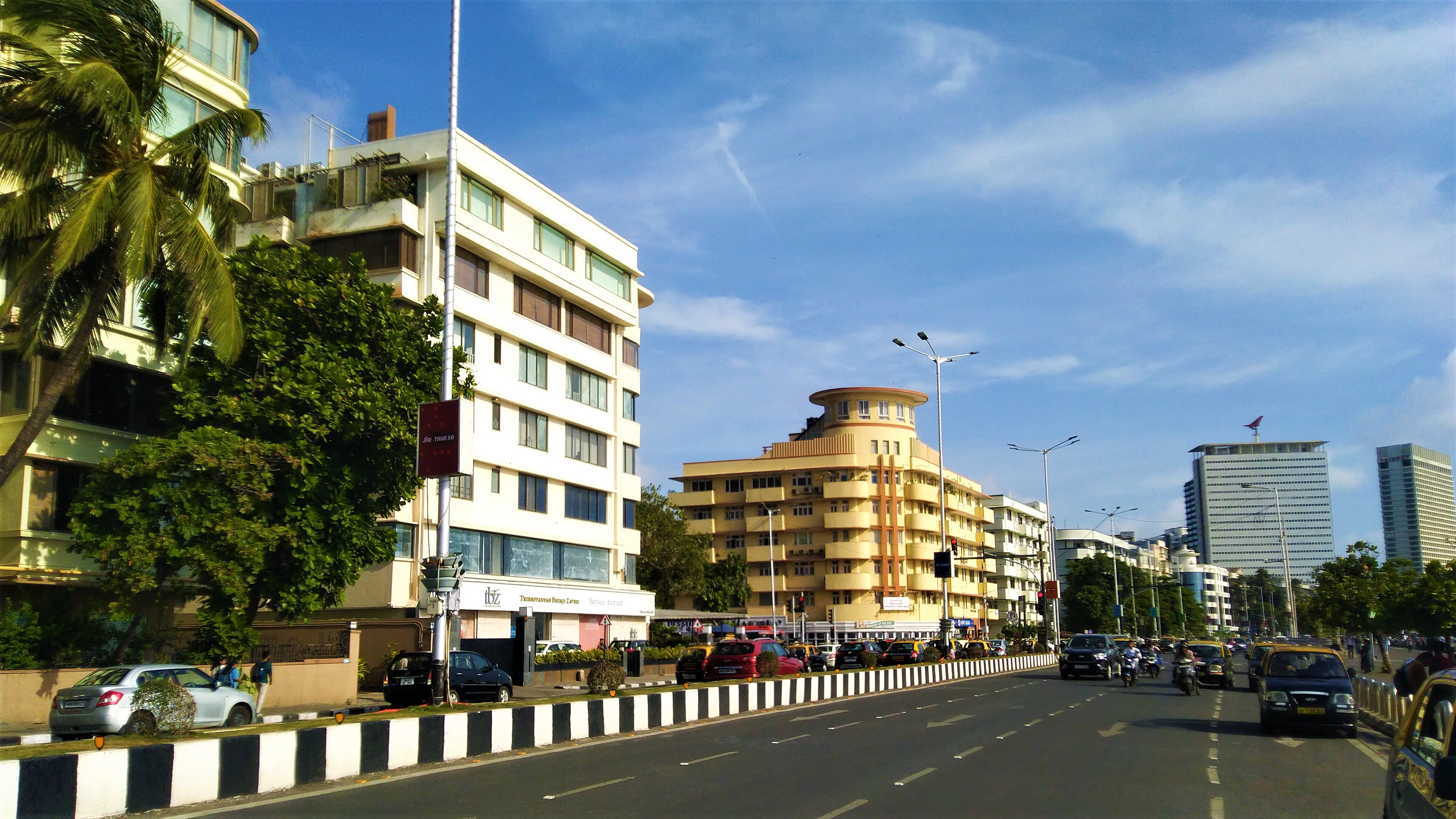
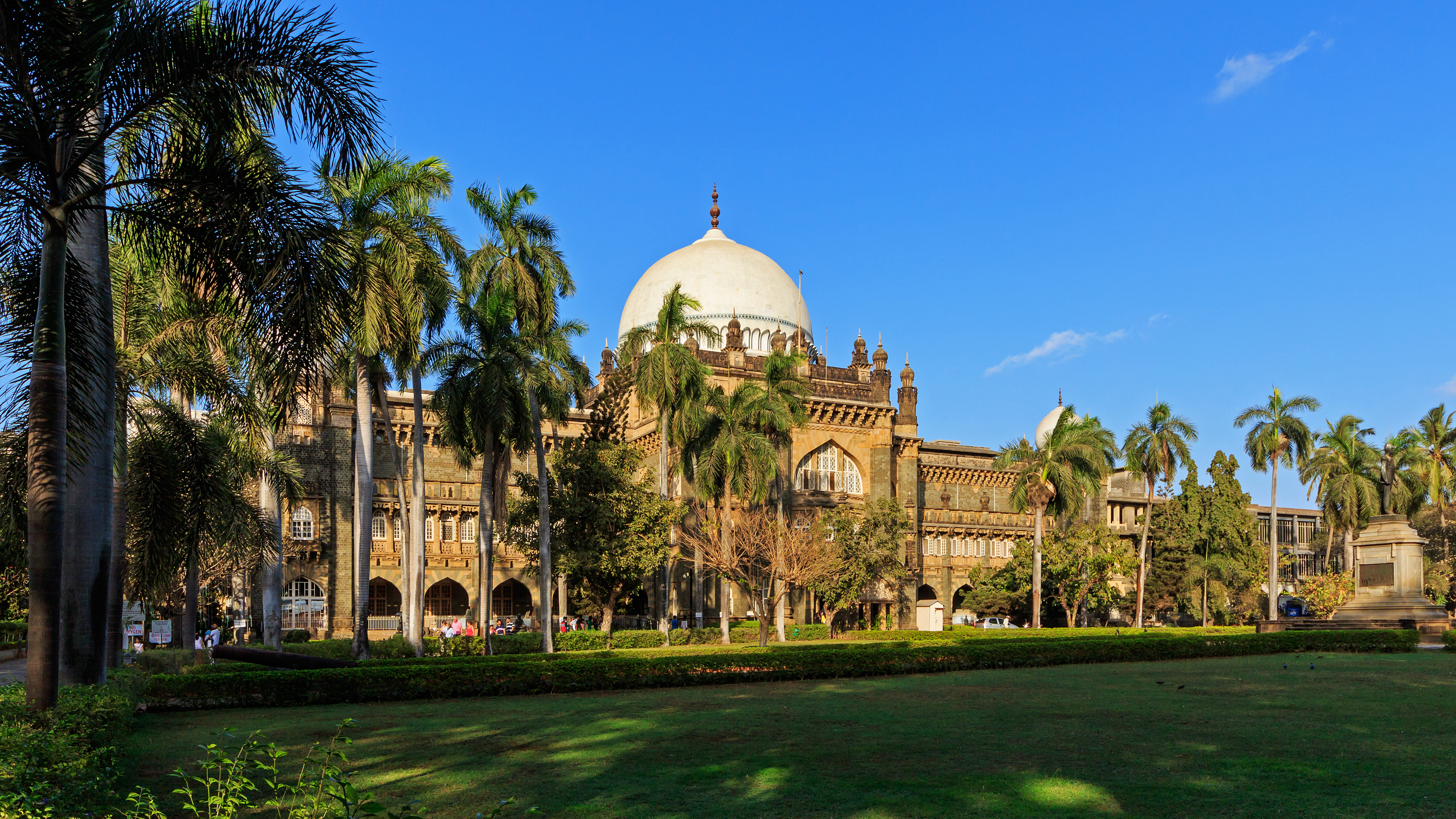
- Top to bottom: Bombay High Court; Art Deco buildings along Marine Drive; and Chhatrapati Shivaji Maharaj Vastu Sangrahalaya

- Location within India
- Location: Mumbai, India
- Criteria: Cultural: (ii), (iv)
- Reference: 1480
- Inscription: 2018 (42nd Session)
- Area: 66.34 ha (163.9 acres)
- Buffer zone: 378.78 ha (936.0 acres)
- Coordinates: 18°55′46″N 72°49′48″E

The Victorian Gothic and Art Deco Ensembles of Mumbai is a collection of 19th-century Victorian Revival public and 20th-century Mumbai Art Deco private buildings in the Fort precinct of Mumbai. This ensemble was declared a UNESCO World Heritage Site in 2018.

These buildings are set around the Oval Maidan, a large recreational ground that was once known as the Esplanade. The east of the Oval is flanked by the Victorian Gothic public buildings and the western side is flanked by the Art Deco buildings of Back bay Reclamation and Marine Drive. This nomination aims to safeguard a total of 94 buildings.

Location and extent of inscribed World Heritage Site: Inscribed property Buffer zone

The 19th century Victorian Gothic buildings that lie to the east of the Oval are mainly the Bombay High Court, The University of Mumbai (Fort Campus) and The City Civil and Sessions Court (Housed in the Old Secretariat Building). This stretch also houses one of the landmarks of Mumbai, the Rajabai Clock Tower. The 20th century Art Deco buildings flank the western stretch of the Oval and consist mainly of privately owned residential buildings and the Eros Cinema among others.

This ensemble of Victorian Gothic and Art Deco buildings was added to the list of United Nations Educational, Scientific, And Cultural's World Heritage Sites on 30 June 2018 during the 42nd session of World Heritage Committee at Manama, Bahrain.

== List of heritage structures or sites by UNESCO ==
=== Victorian ===
==== Indian Neo-Gothic (Hindu Gothic) architecture ====
- City Civil and Sessions Court (Old Secretariat)
- University of Bombay complex:
  - Rajabai Clock Tower
  - University Library
  - Convocation Hall
- Bombay High Court
- Public Works Department Building
- Esplanade Mansion
- David Sassoon Library
- Elphinstone College
- Maharashtra Police Headquarters
- Indian Mercantile Mansion

==== Neoclassical ====
- Standard Chartered Bank Building
- Wellington Fountain
- Army and Navy Building
- Institute of Science
- Sir Cowasji Jehangir Hall, National Gallery of Modern Art

==== Indo-Saracenic ====
- Western Railway Headquarters building
- Chhatrapati Shivaji Maharaj Vastu Sangrahalaya
- Majestic Aamdar Niwas

=== Art Deco ===
- Regal Cinema
- Eros Cinema
- Motabhoy Mansion
- Soona Mahal
- Keval Mahal
- Buildings around the Oval Maidan and Marine Drive
- Metro INOX Cinemas

== Gallery ==
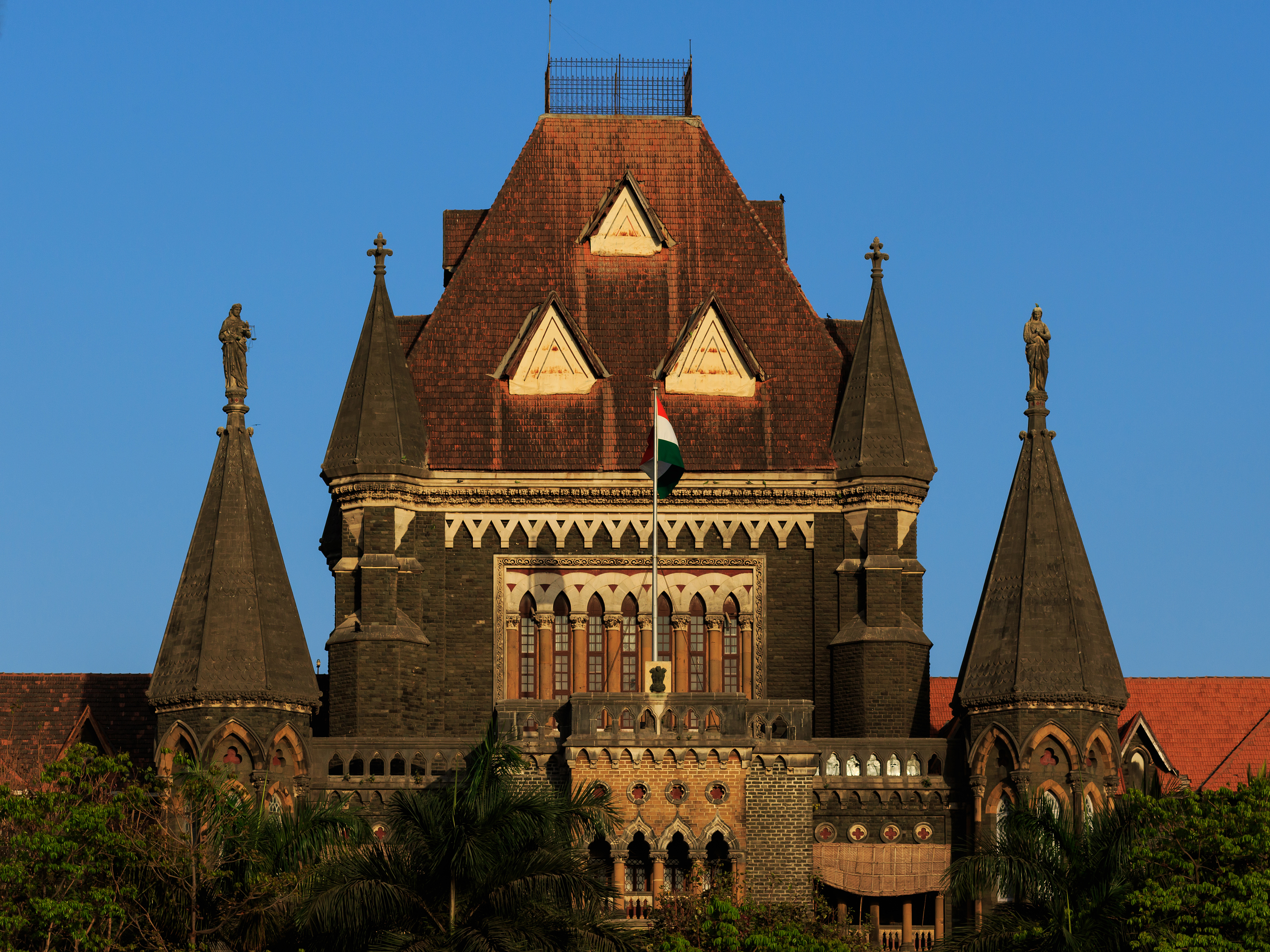
Bombay High Court (Neo-Gothic)

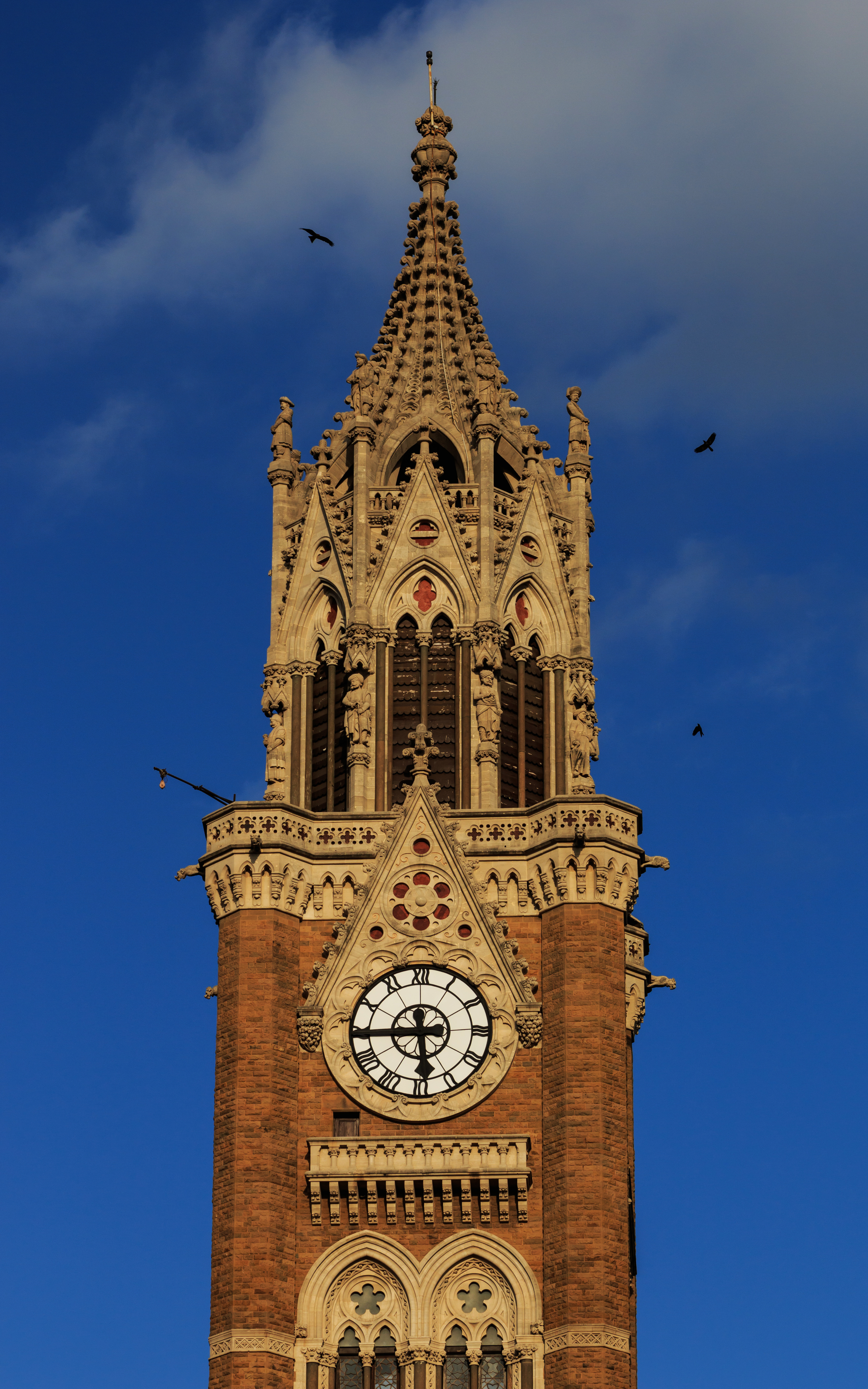
Rajabai Clock Tower (Neo-Gothic)

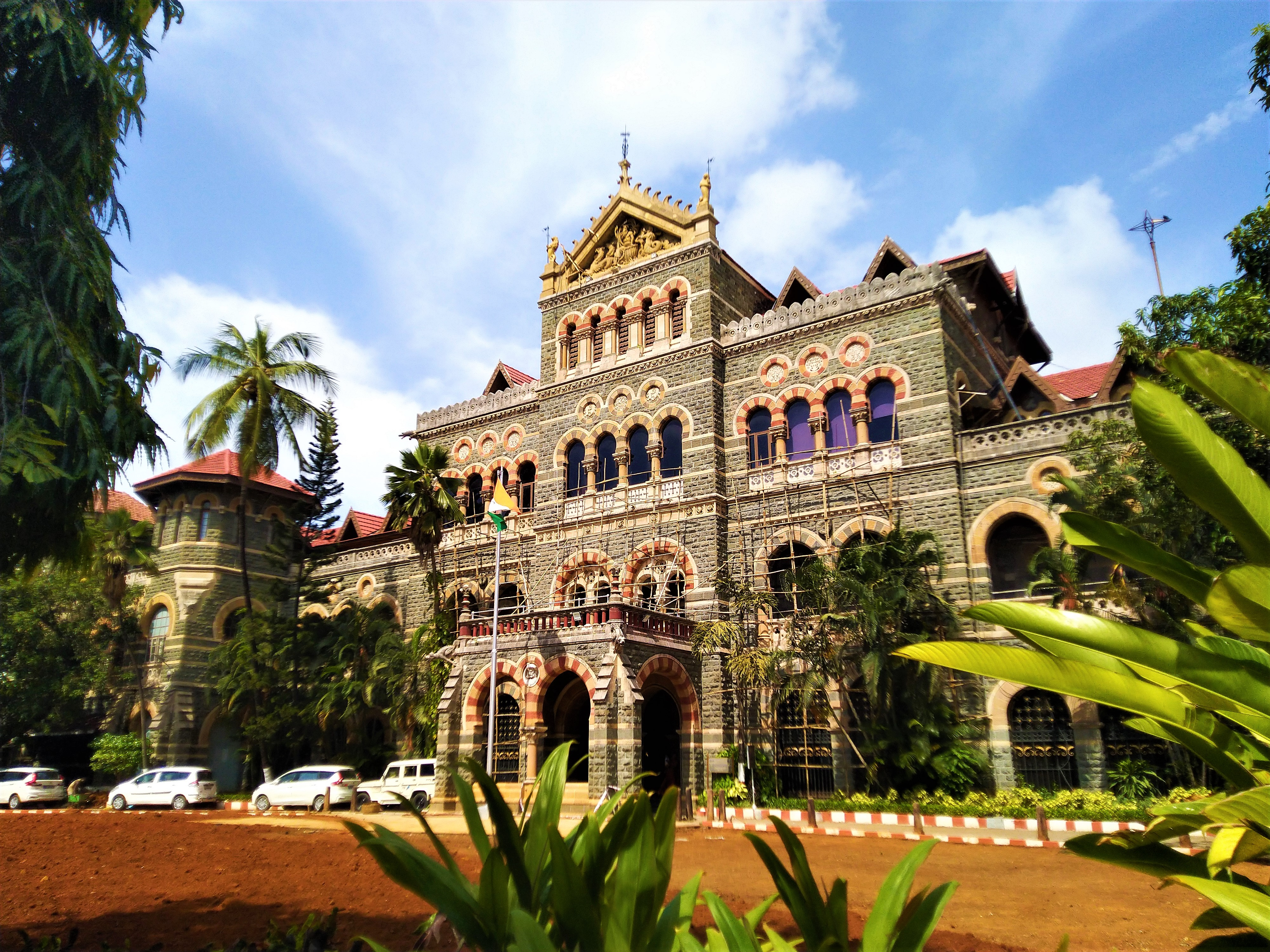
Maharashtra Police Headquarters (Neo-Gothic)

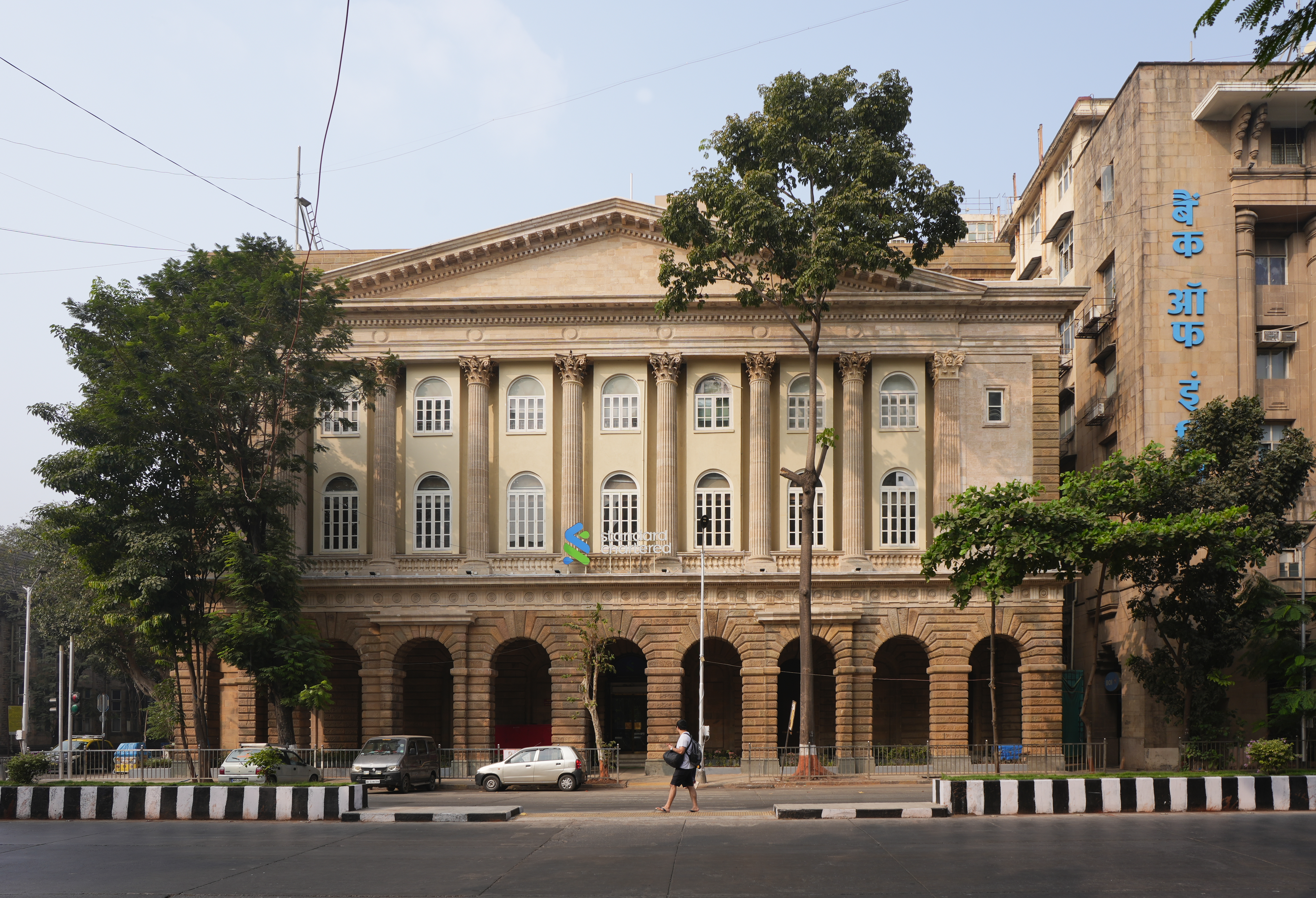
Standard Chartered Bank Building (Neoclassical)

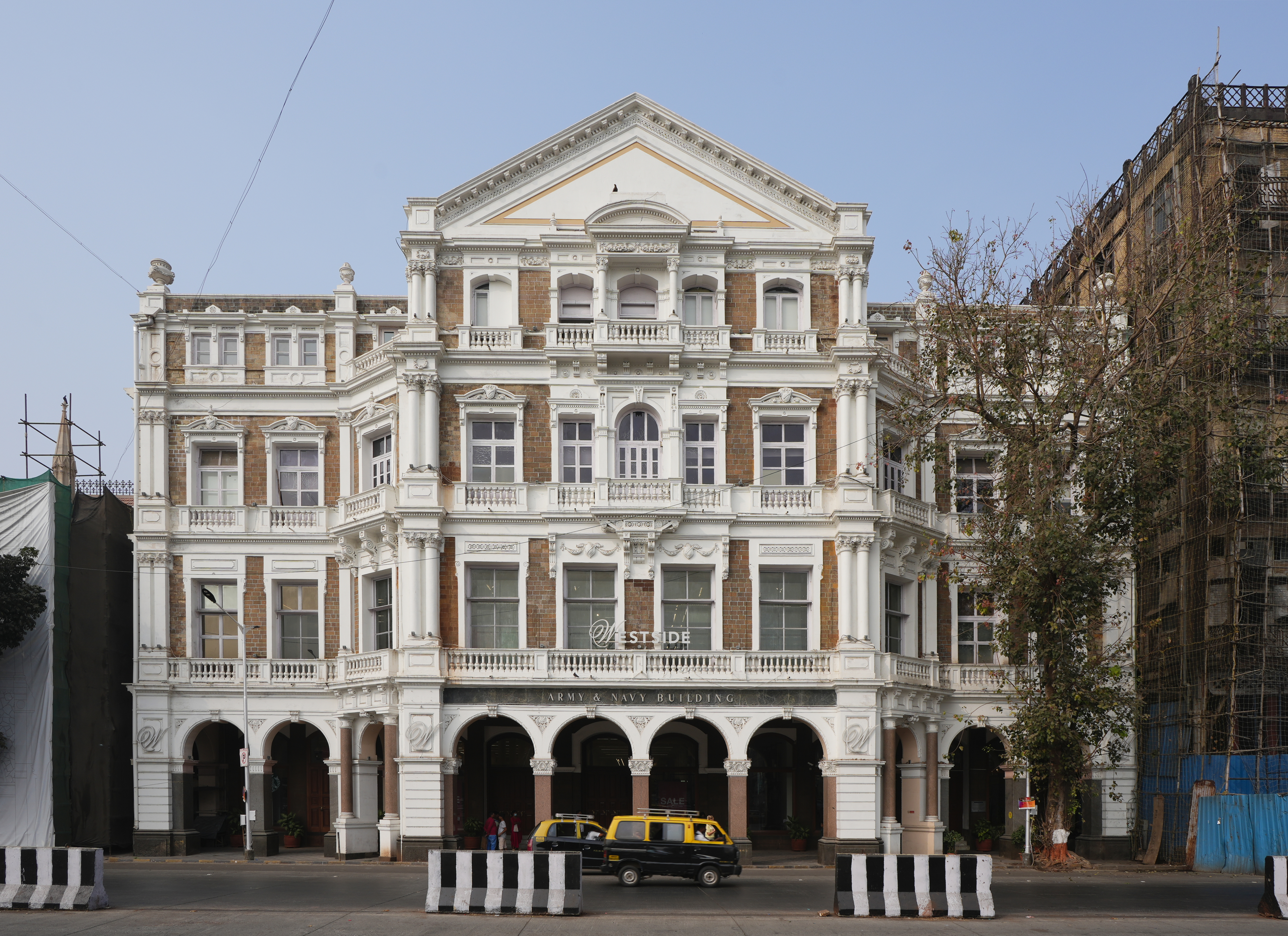
Army and Navy Building (Neoclassical)

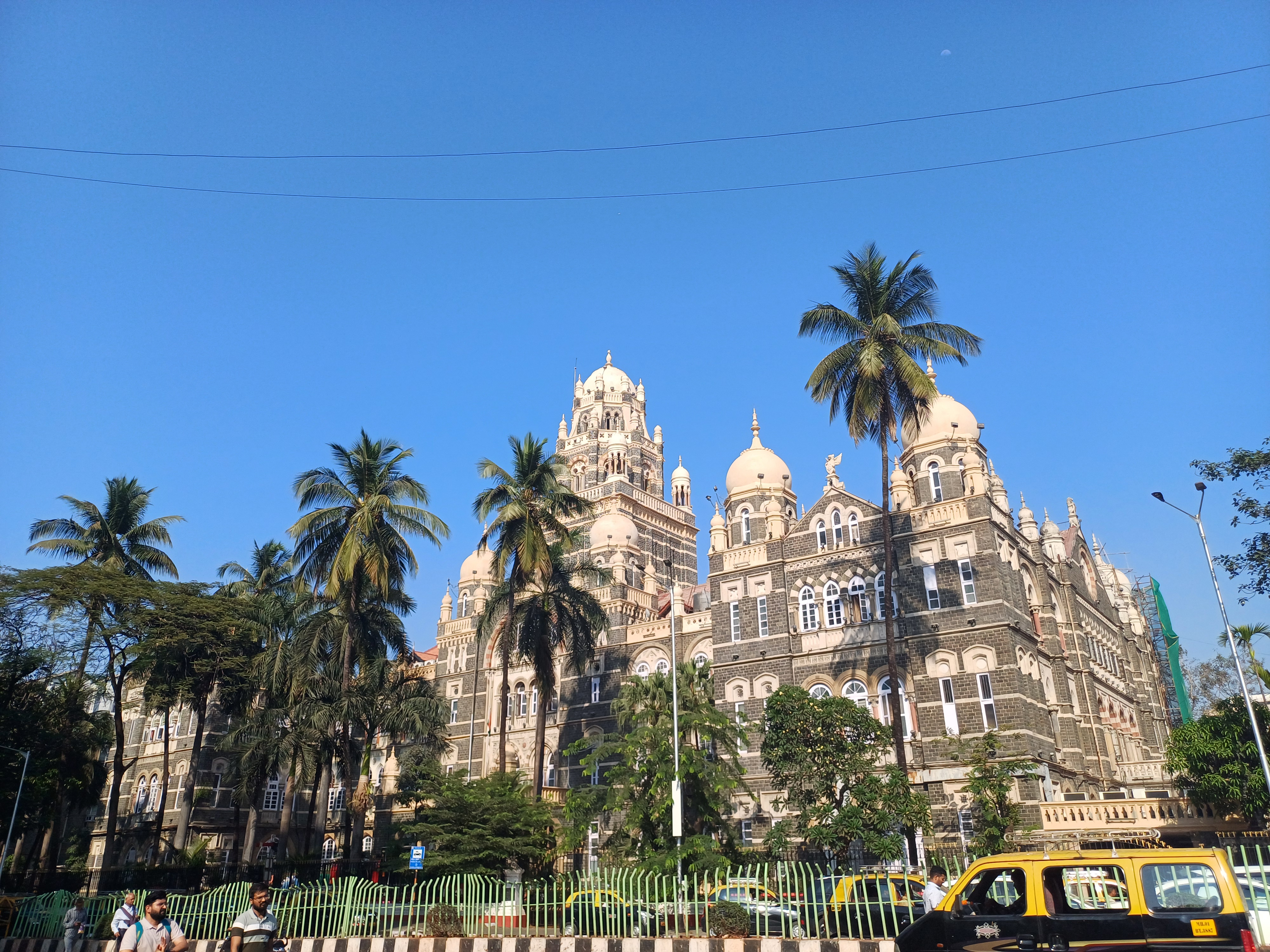
Western Railway Headquarters Building (Indo-Saracenic)

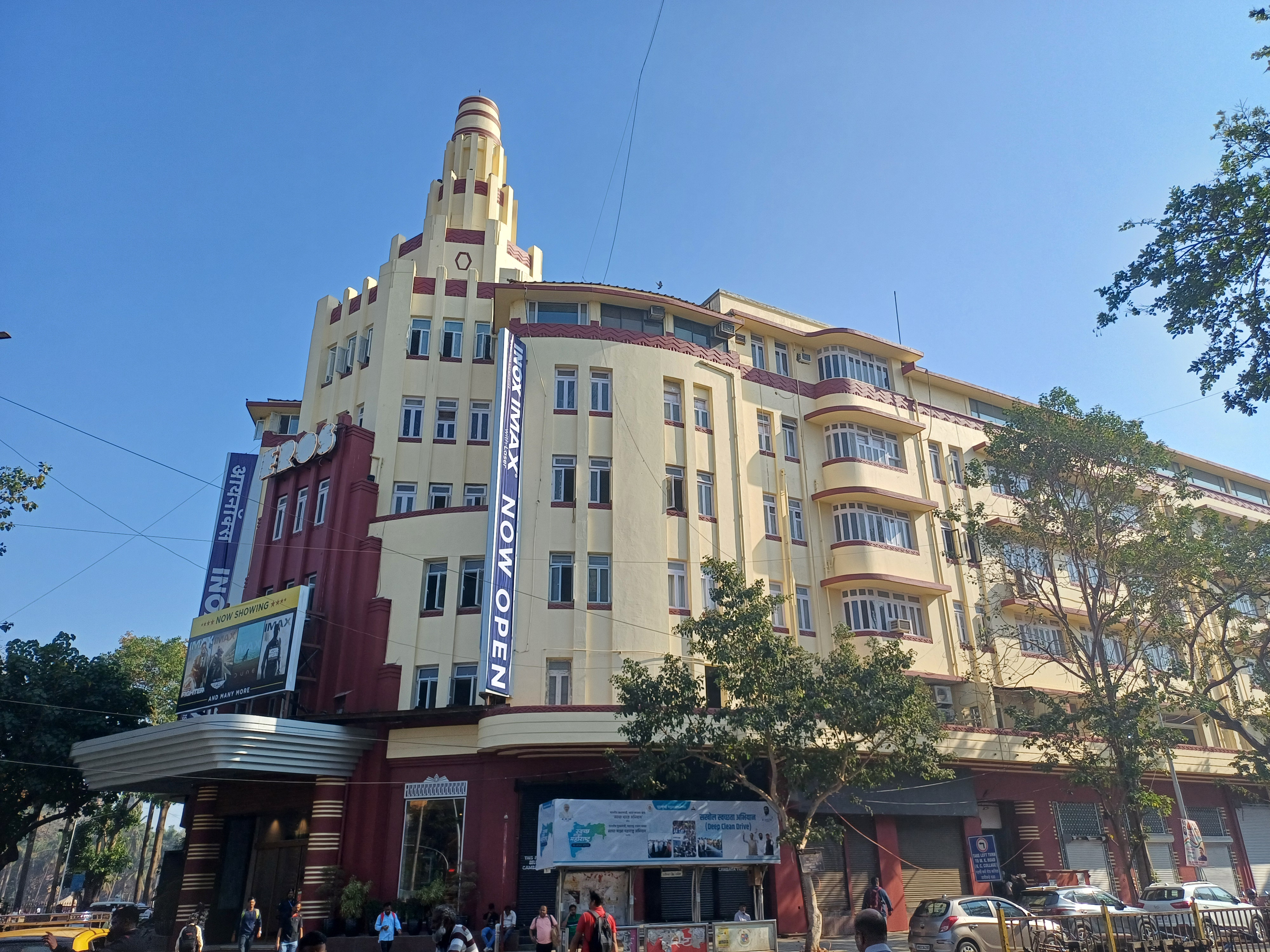
The Eros Cinema (Art Deco)
