= Karfule =

Art Deco fuel station in Mumbai

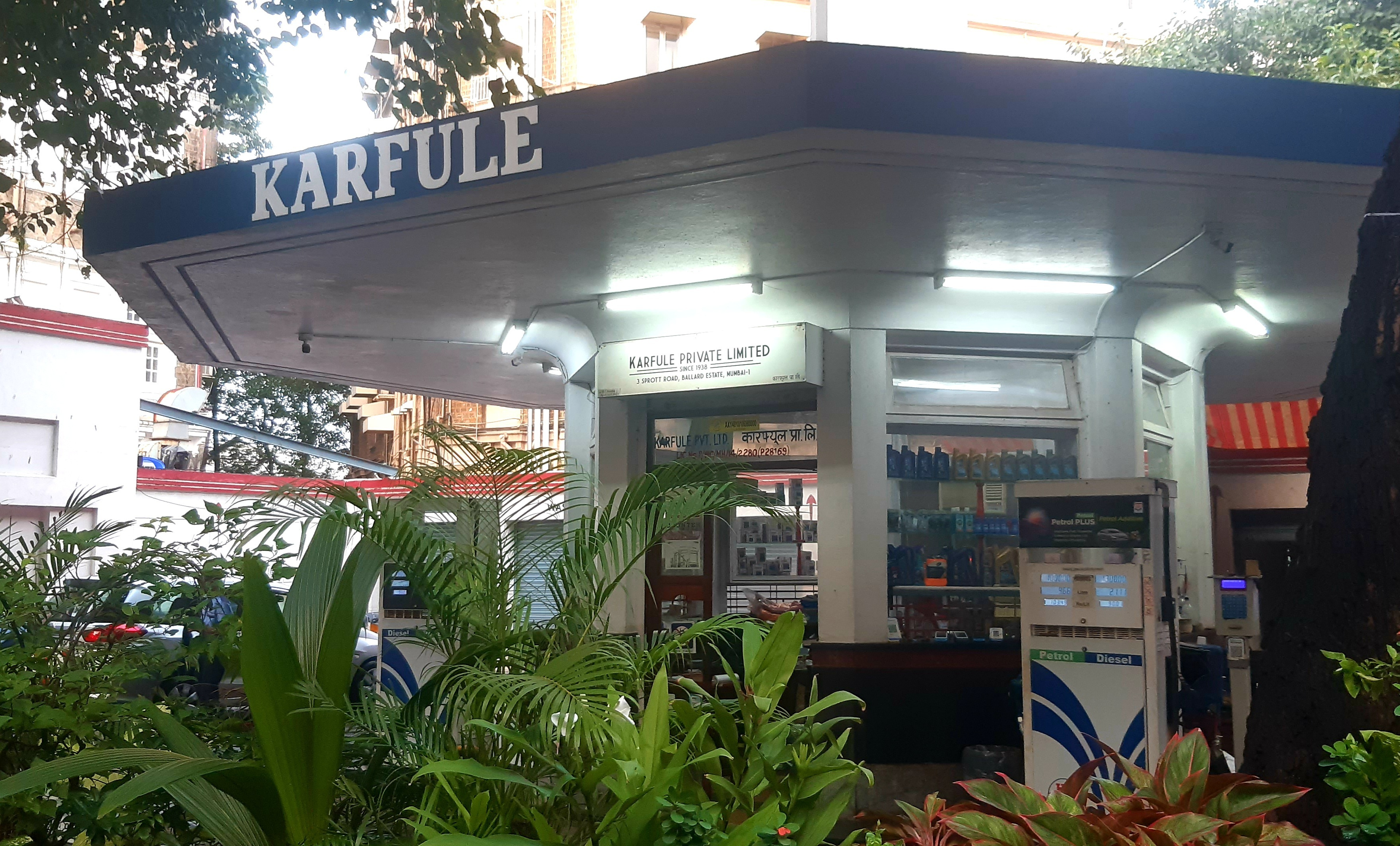
- Karfule fuel station
- Interactive map of the Karfule area

General information
- Type: Petrol Pump
- Architectural style: Art Deco
- Location: Ballard Estate, Fort, Mumbai, India
- Completed: 1938; 88 years ago

Design and construction
- Architect: Gajanan B. Mhatre

Karfule or Karfule Petrol Pump is a family-run Art Deco fuel station located in Ballard Estate, Mumbai. It was built by Gabriel Sequeira and designed by Art Deco veteran Gajanan B. Mhatre through his firm, Architecture Studio. Karfule was opened for business on October 3, 1938.

The fuel station is still in operation and retains many of its Art Deco characteristics including the octagonal central kiosk and cantilevered cement canopy. Fuel was originally supplied to the station by Caltex, followed by Hindustan Petroleum in 1978. It is the city's only surviving Art Deco fuel station.

The word 'Karfule' is a corruption of the words 'car fuel', which was suggested by Gabriel's wife Teresa.
