= Asiatic Society (disambiguation) =

The Asiatic Society in Kolkata, India is a society for Asian studies and the promotion of Asian literature, arts and sciences. It was originally founded by philologist Sir William Jones in 1784 for research in Oriental studies.

It could also refer to any of the following societies modelled after The Asiatic Society of Kolkata:

- Asiatic Society of Mumbai, founded in 1804 as the Literary Society of Bombay in Mumbai, India by Sir James Mackintosh
  - Asiatic Society of Mumbai Town Hall, town hall and library in Mumbai, India
- Asiatic Society of Japan, Yokohama, Japan, estb. 1872, focused on Japanese studies
- Asiatic Society of Bangladesh, Dhaka, Bangladesh, founded in 1952 as the Asiatic Society of East Pakistan
- Royal Asiatic Society of Great Britain and Ireland, London, England, estb. 1824
  - Royal Asiatic Society China, Shanghai, China, estb. 1857
  - Royal Asiatic Society Hong Kong Branch, estb. 1847, focused on Sinology
  - Royal Asiatic Society Korea Branch, Seoul, South Korea, estb. 1900, focused on Korean studies
  - Royal Asiatic Society of Sri Lanka, Colombo, Sri Lanka, founded in 1845 as the Royal Asiatic Society of Ceylon
  - Malaysian Branch of the Royal Asiatic Society, Kuala Lumpur, Malaysia, founded in 1877 at Raffles Library, Singapore as the Straits Branch of the Royal Asiatic Society

== See also ==
- Société Asiatique, French learned society for Asian studies
