= Bombay Theatre =

Cinema in Mumbai, India

The Bombay Theatre or the Bombay Playhouse was an early theatre situated in Bombay in India. It was situated within the English fort of Bombay, north of the Bombay Green (later rebuilt as Horniman Circle). It was proposed in 1770, and a public subscription was raised for it by 1775, supported by a land grant from the government. It was among the earliest theatres in British India, preceded only by the older Calcutta Playhouse. The theatre eventually fell out of popular favour, and was closed by the 1840s.

== History ==
The theatre was situated north of the Bombay Green, a wide circular space at the centre of Bombay's Fort, that was home to the Cotton market. A theatre was proposed by theatre aficionados, and a grant of land was sanctioned by Governor William Hornby between 1771 and 1774 for the theatre. It was built in 1776 on a swampy land that formerly held a stagnant tank. The succeeding governor, William Meadows, too declared that the theatre need not pay any rent to the government.

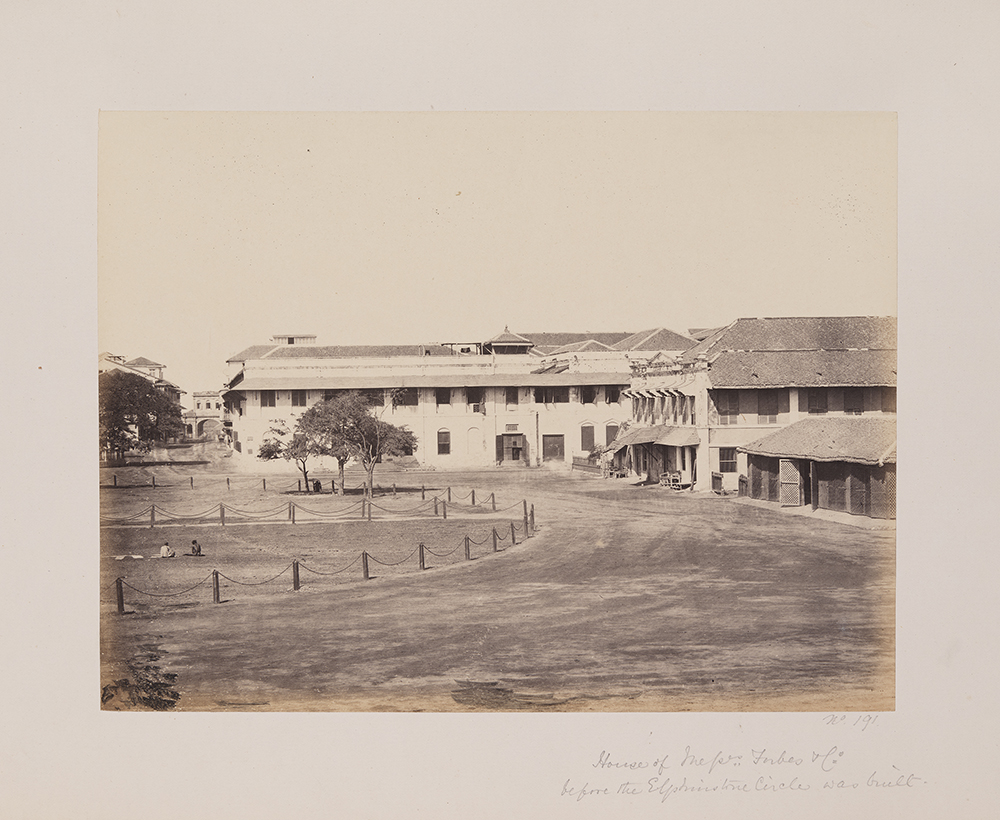
A westward view from around the location of Town Hall. The Theatre can be spotted just adjacent to the dwarfed Firehouse building at the right.

At the early stage, the players were amateurs and the theatre's membership included officers of the EIC, and even women. The theatre received donations from European civilians, military officers, Brahmin merchants, shipbuilders. Records of the theatre suggest Indian patrons as amongst the earliest subscribers, and eagerly contributed during every subscription round.

The Theatre was rebuilt in 1818, after similar successful endeavours in Europe and the Deccan. The doors of this theatre were opened at 4 p.m., and performances began at 7 p.m.. At the time, the tickets for the box and pit costed Rs.8, and no tickets were to be issued for the gallery.

Eventually the theatre fell into disuse, once in around July 1829 being consigned for the reception of cotton and gunny bags. After the departure of Governor Mountstuart Elphinstone, it fell into debt. It was eventually put up for sale in around July 1835 and eventually sold to Jamsetjee Jeejeebhoy for Rs. 50,000 in October. He paid off the theatre's debts and loans, but retained the property.
