= English Fort of Bombay =

Fort in Mumbai, India

The English Fort of Bombay
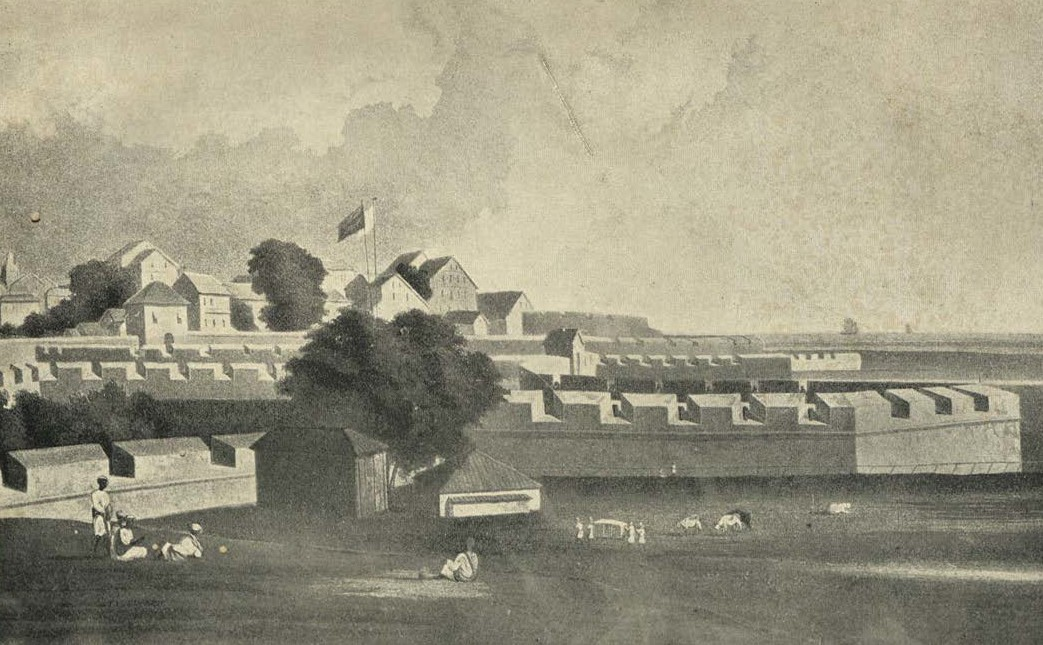
- A view of the Fort from the Esplanade

General information
- Type: Fort
- Location: Fort, Mumbai
- Completed: 1 June 1716
- Demolished: 1862-63
- Client: British

The English Fort of Bombay was a fortification situated around the present day Fort region in Mumbai, India. Contrary to popular belief, this is different from the Fort St.George, which was but a northward extension of the walls. The Fort was around 1 mile long, and around a third of a mile in width. The Bombay Castle was located near its centre, it being the oldest fortification. The walls were proposed all the way back in the latter part of 1600s by Bombay's first governor, Gerald Aungier. He proposed the erection of eight feet high walls; the matter of walls was not fully realised until 1716, when Charles Boone was the Governor.

== The Gates ==
The Fort had Three Gates: the Bazaar Gate (North, opposite today's GPO), the Churchgate (West, on the present site of Flora Fountain), and the Apollo Gate (South, near St.Andrew's Church). Walking straight from the west gate led to the St.Thomas' Church (hence the name). On the other hand, the Apollo Gate was named after the Apollo Bunder, and the Bazaar Gate after the bazaar (market) located inside. The last was a triple gate (hence, also called the Teen Darwaza), while the last two were double gates (having an inner and outer gate). In earlier times, both the Apollo gate, and Churchgate were closed at sunset, while the Bazaar Gate was shut around half an hour later. The latter was, however, available for the use of Government servants living outside till around 9:30 p.m. The Churchgate was initially called the Pawanchakki Gate (Windmill in the local language), since it would lead to the windmill on the western side of the island, that was constructed in 1725 for grinding wheat.

There was also a statue of Marquis Wellesley, just outside the outer Churchgate. Businessmen in Bombay contributed towards this statue, which was ordered from England. It depicted the former governor sitting on a throne and gifting a purse to a Marathi wrestler standing in front of him. Adjacent to the wrestler was a statue of a lady, whose right hand touched a plaque engraved with the words 'Wisdom, Energy, Integrity'. Sculptures of a lion and lioness were carved in the rear. The people of Bombay referred to it as the "Pehelwan's (wrestler's) statue". Upon its installation, the statue began to be worshipped by a few, who were mistaken that the Company Sarkar had ordered an English god for their worship. For several years, the people offered coconuts, conducted poojas, and even took vows in front of the statue. Realising that this was inappropriate, the government resolved to put an end to this practice. An iron fence was installed, and a guard was appointed to warn any person who tried to worship the statue.

In 1845, the Bazaar and Church gates were opened throughout the day and night, while Apollo was opened on the call of gunfire, and shut at 10:00 p.m. Sentries were posted at all three gates for inspection of articles brought in, or sent out of the fort. These examined any articles that might have ammunition or arms.

== Bombay Green ==
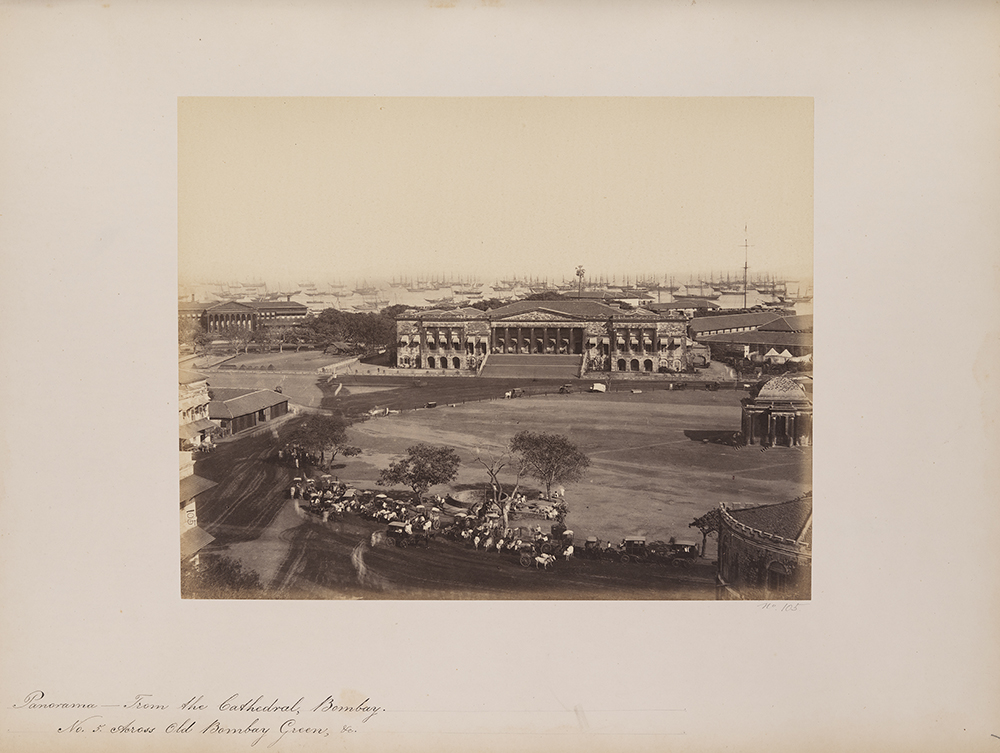
View of the Bombay Green from the St.Thomas' Cathedral (dated.1855-62). The Town Hall is visible at the center.

At the centre of the Fort township, there was a large circular space called the Bombay Green. Trade of cotton took place in this central space situated in front of the Town Hall. It could be easily seen by any individual standing below the Churchgate, since it was directly at the end of the Churchgate Street. Three wells dotted its Western side. These were constructed by philanthropists as a part of Water charity. One such well with a Banyan Tree was built over with a Water fountain in 1873. At the centre was a statue of Marquis Cornwallis, who was worshiped by the poor, and the labourers mistakenly as a 'Gora Dev' (translated to Fair skinned God) (visit the gallery section). Some prominent Buildings located along the Green were the Bombay Theater building and the Fire house (Fire Brigade) in the North, and the Town Hall in the East, and the St.Thomas Church in the West. Eventually the Green paved way for the Elphinstone Circle, which was created slightly North of it, (to align with the Town Hall) and is now known as the Horniman Circle.

== The Ditch ==
The Fort was surrounded by a ditch, 2.75 mi (4.425 km) long, constructed in 1739. This was subscribed by some principal merchants, who contributed Rs.30,000 towards the work, perhaps under the fear of an attack from the Marathas. It was filled with seawater, and could be filled or drain as desired. When it rained, some drains within the city would open into this moat. Waste would often be thrown into the ditch, and it was noted on 17 May 1859, that the "Ditch [was] fearfully foul." One more incident is from May 1851, when the entire ditch fell dry, something that rarely ever occurred. People were prohibited from washing, swimming, or fishing in it as well.

== The Great Fire of Bombay ==
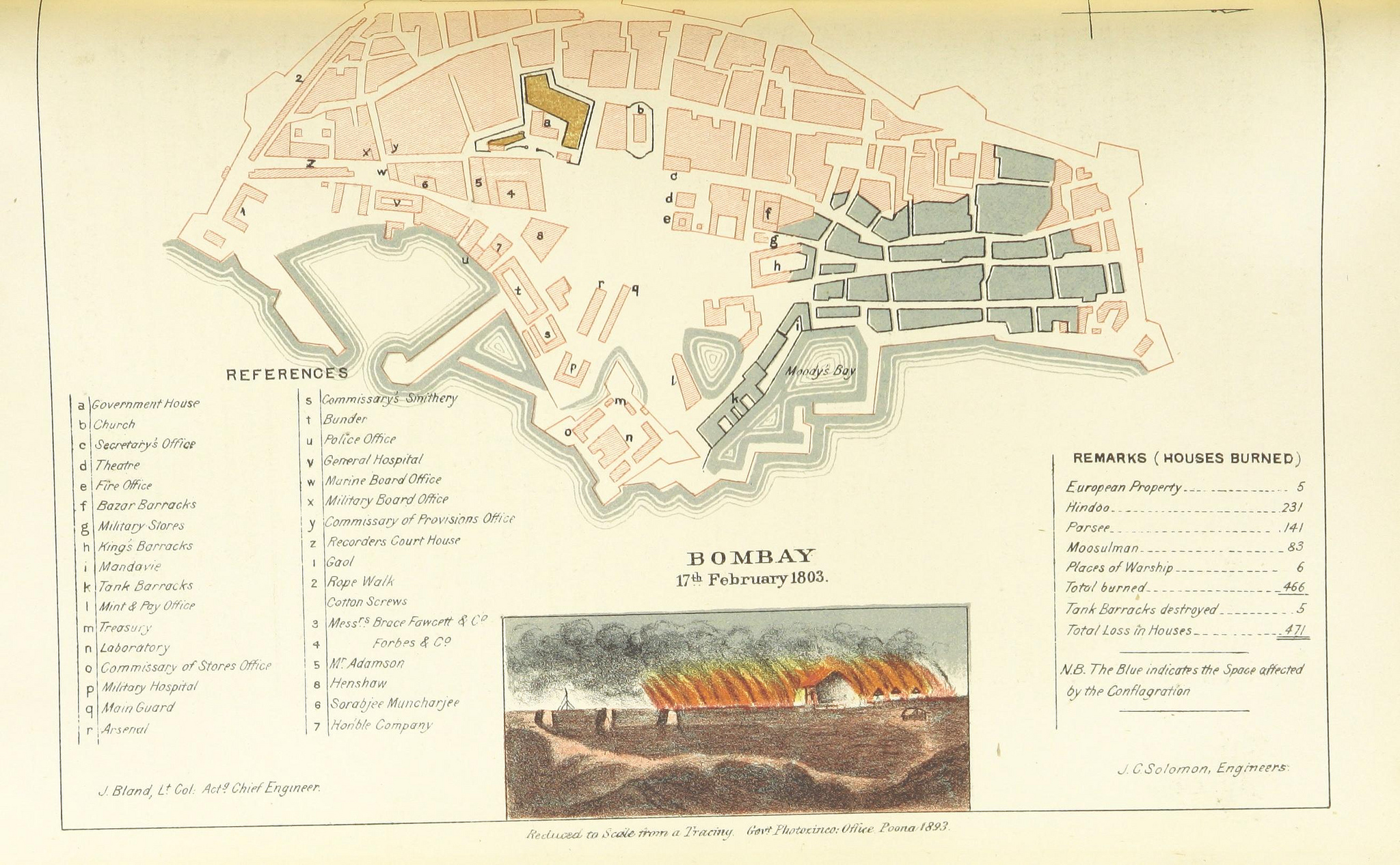
Map indicating the damage from the 17 February 1803 Bombay Fire

On 17 February 1803, a fire broke out within the fort. This was in the Northern part of the fort, where the native residents lived (as opposed to the South, where the British among others lived). A total of 471 houses, 5 barracks, and 6 places of worship were burned in the fire.

== Demolition ==
The Ramparts were eventually removed between 1862 and 1864. The walls were deemed unnecessary by this time, and their demolition paved the way for the expansion of the city. Commenting on the demolition of the walls, author James Douglas said that the walls had never been a defence, and commented sarcastically that they had only protected (blocked) the city from ventilation, and the winds from the Konkan. He spoke of how the city needed proper protection only during the 1689 Siege of Bombay (during the Child's War), which was provided by the Bombay Castle.

== Gallery ==
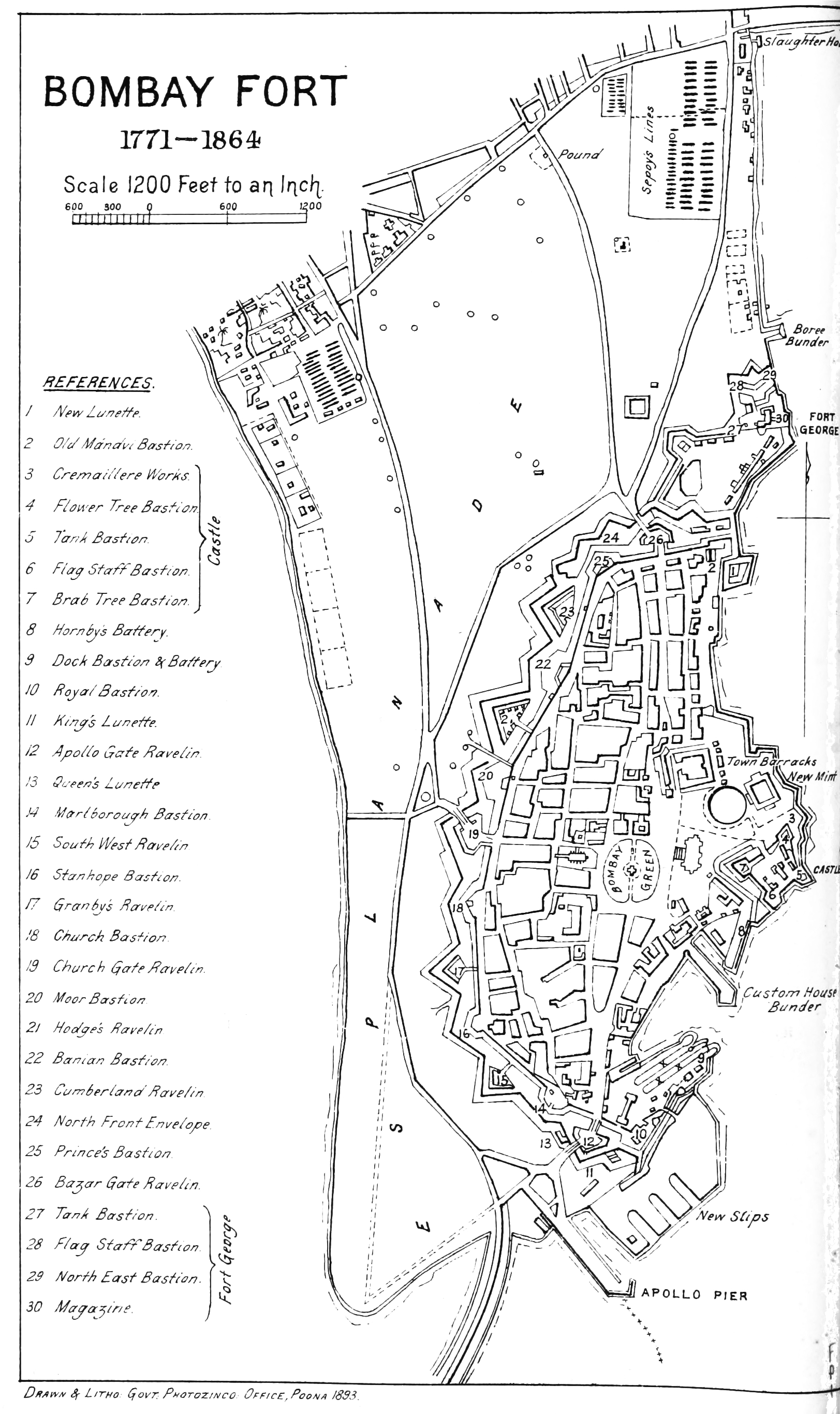
Map of the fort. The Ravelins of the gates are-26,19,12

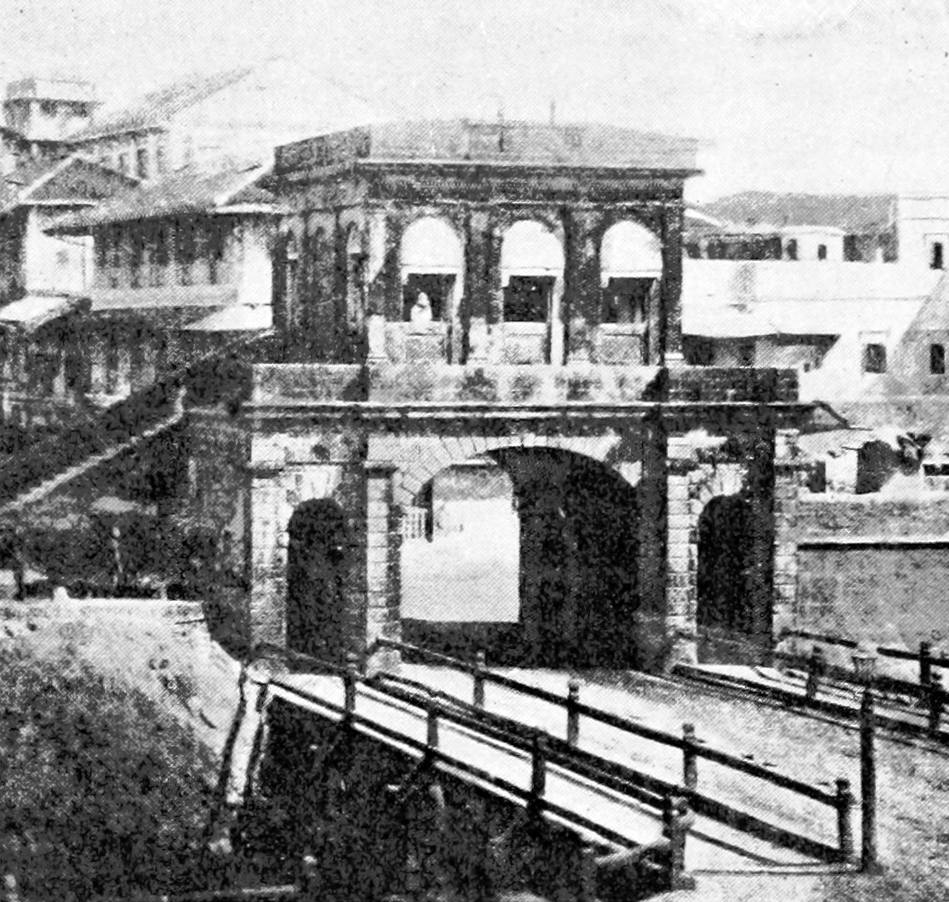
The inner Churchgate,1863

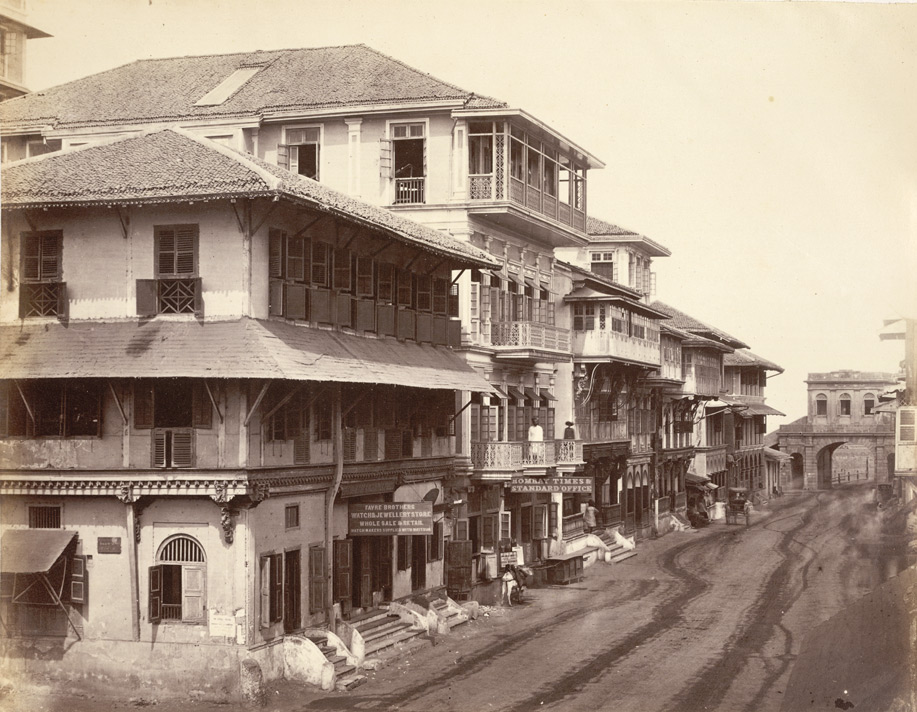
Churchgate Street in the 1860s. Spot the Gate at the end of the road

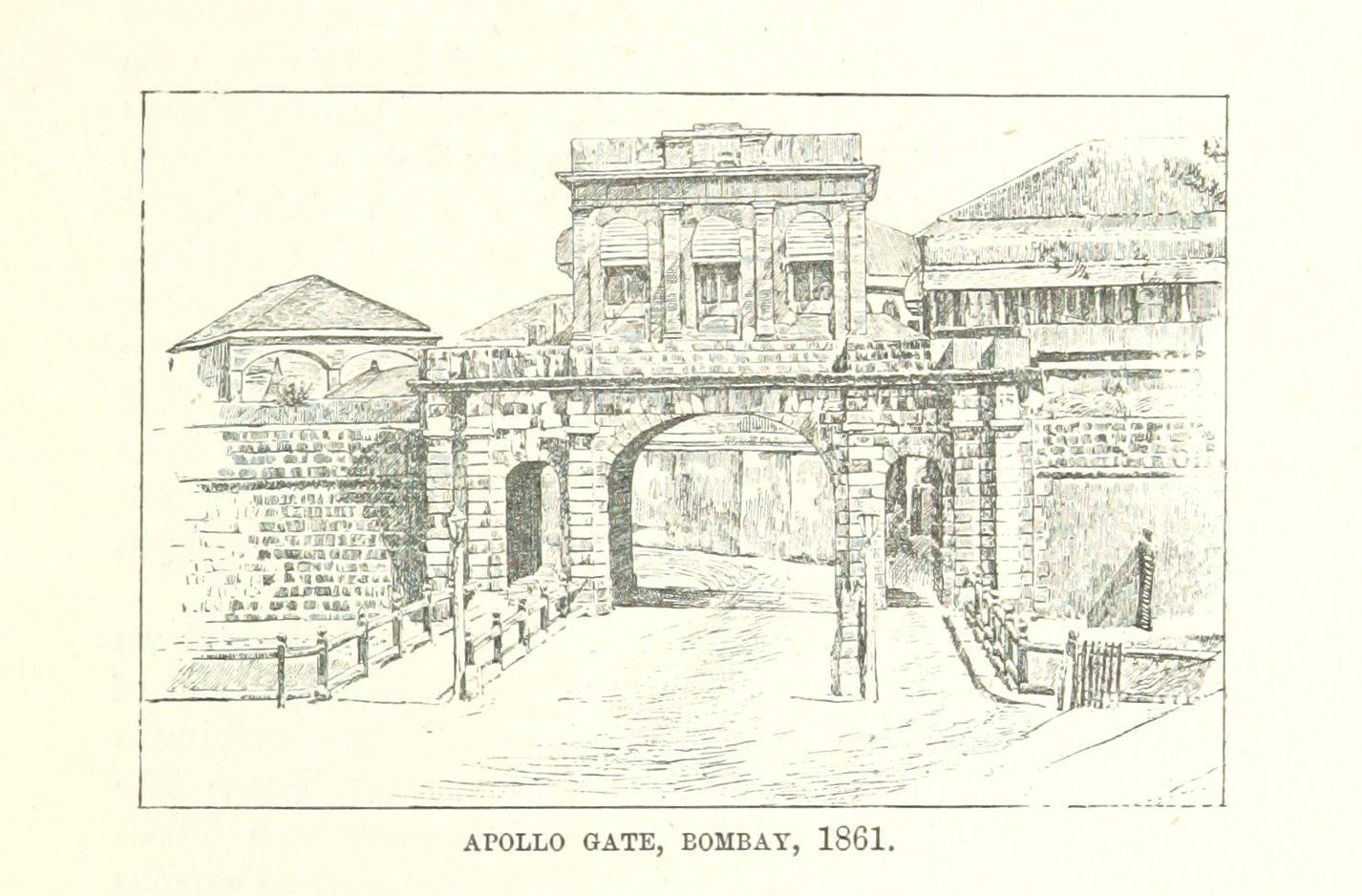
Inner Apollo Gate, Bombay, 1861

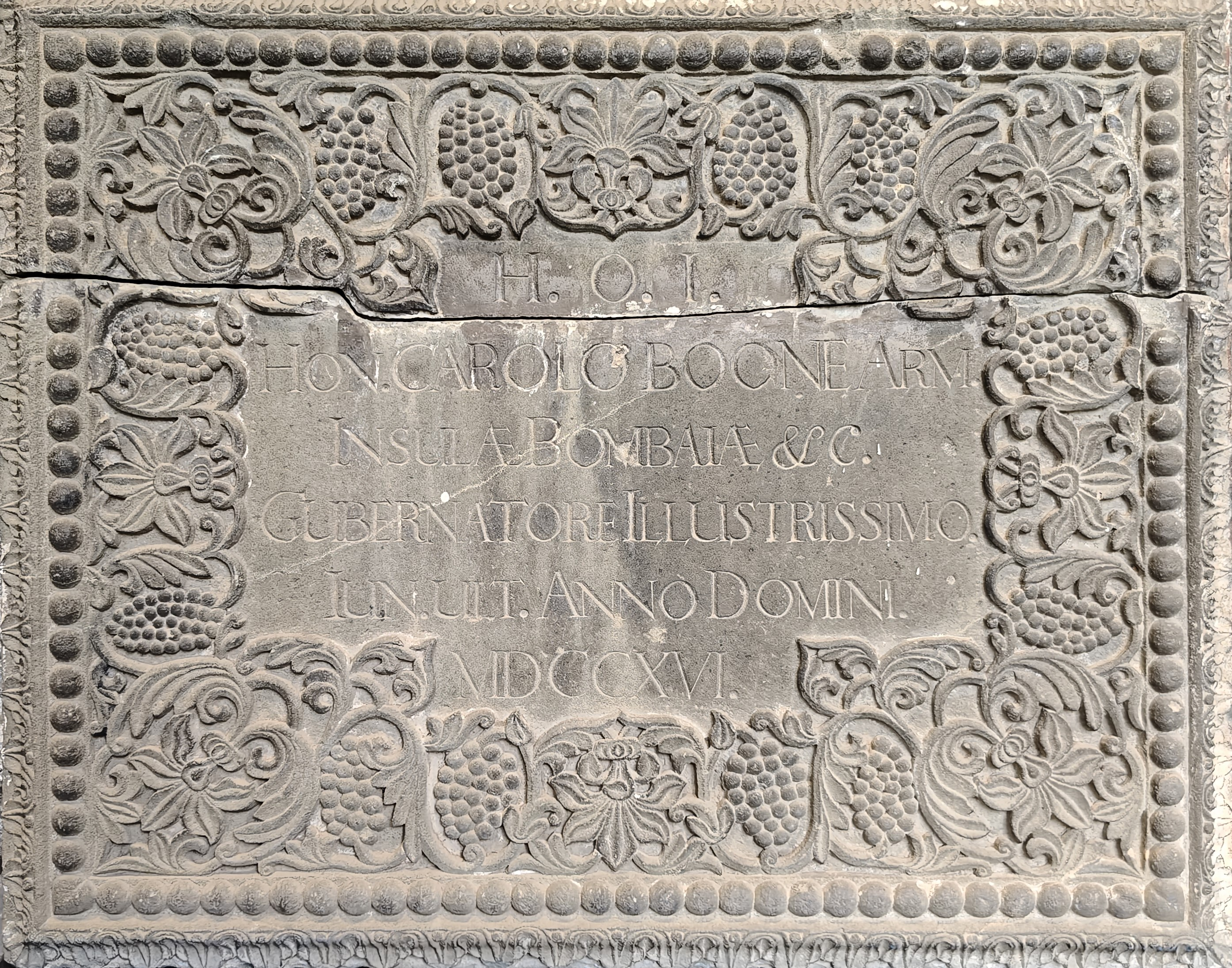
The Inscription from Apollo Gate of Bombay's Fort.

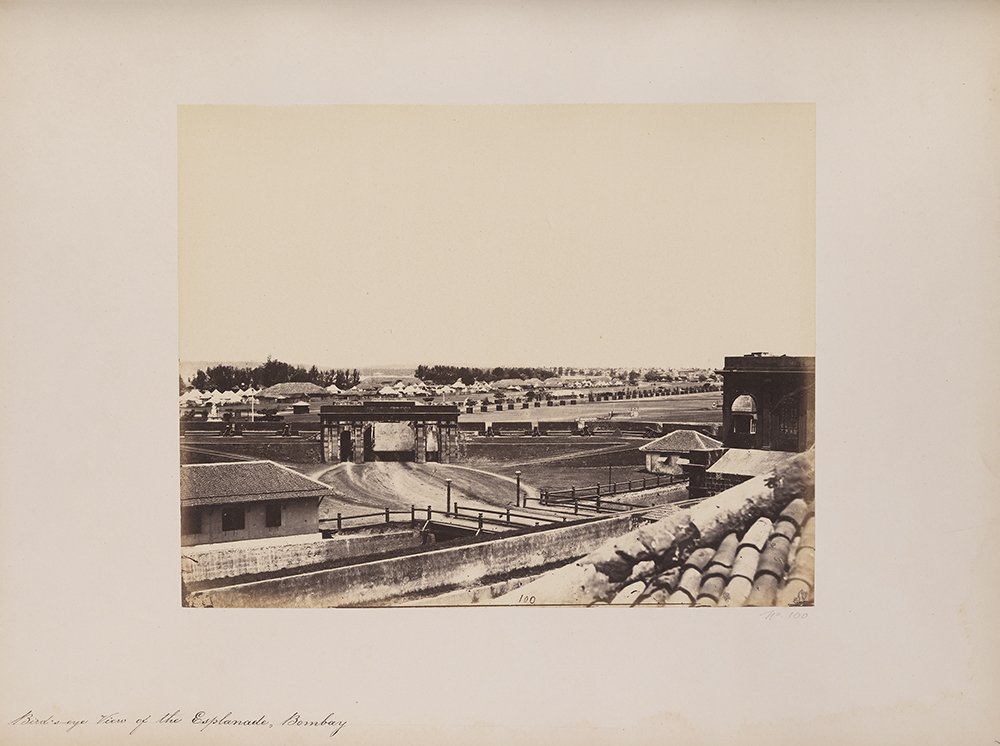
Bird's Eye View of the Esplanade, showing the outer Churchgate

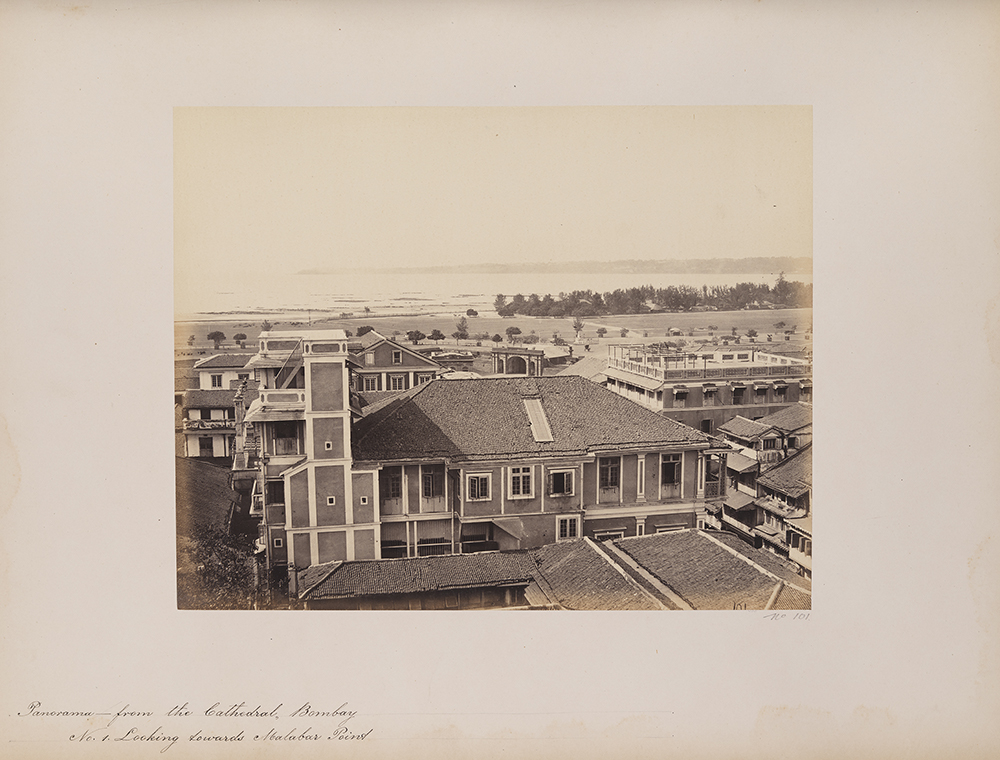
View from the Cathedral, looking west.

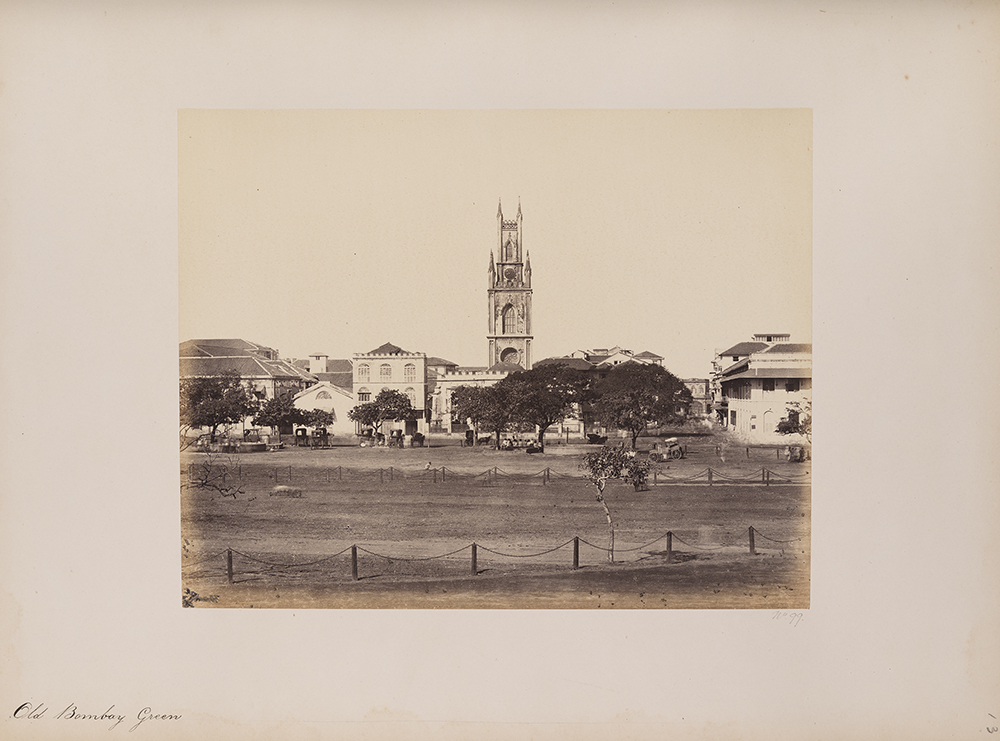
View from the Town Hall, looking west. The Churchgate can be spotted at the end of the street

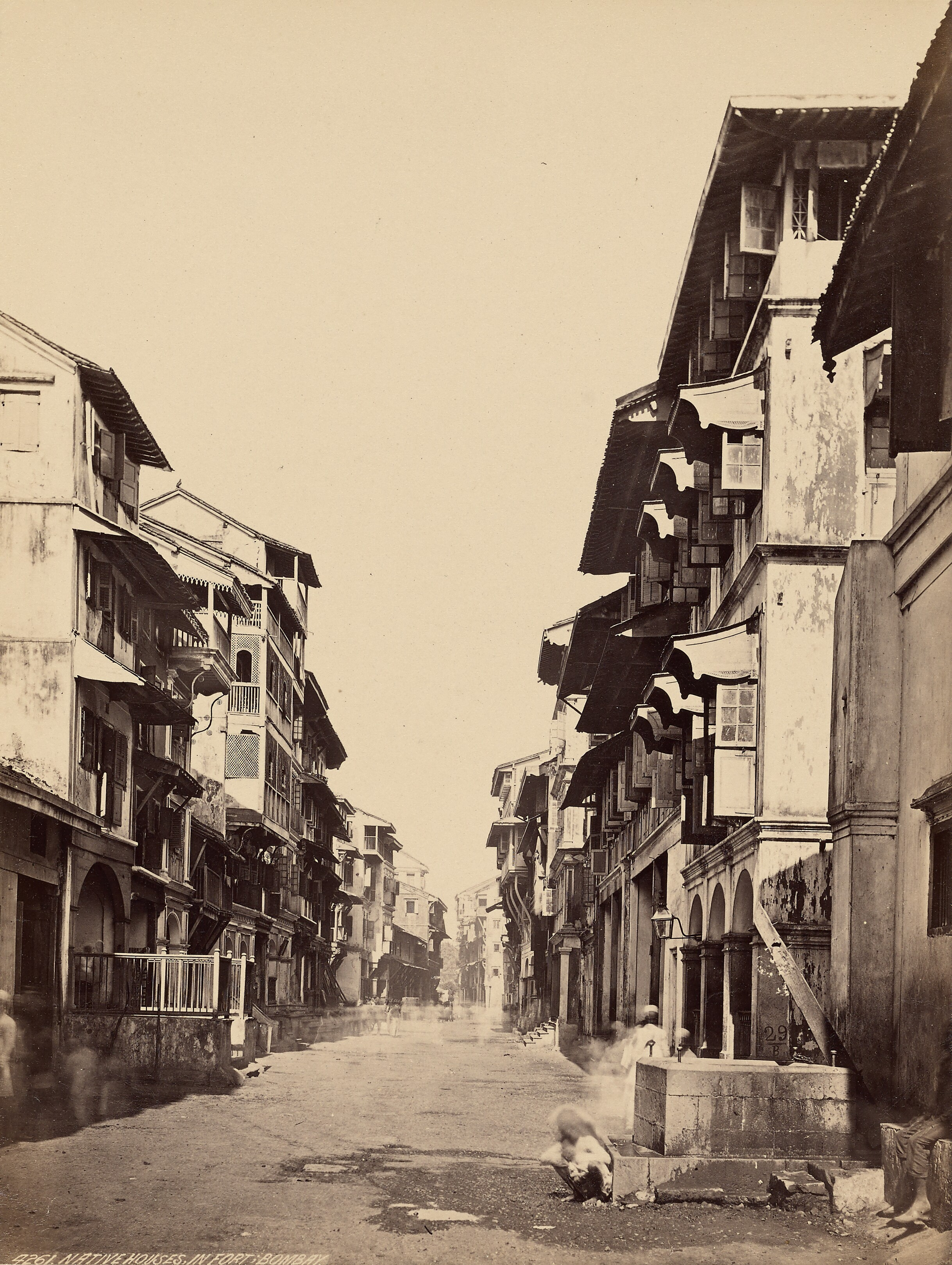
A street in the fort, 1883

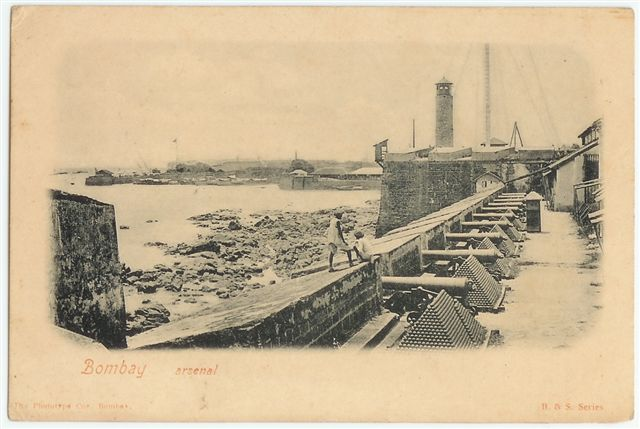
The Arsenal on Bombay's Fort

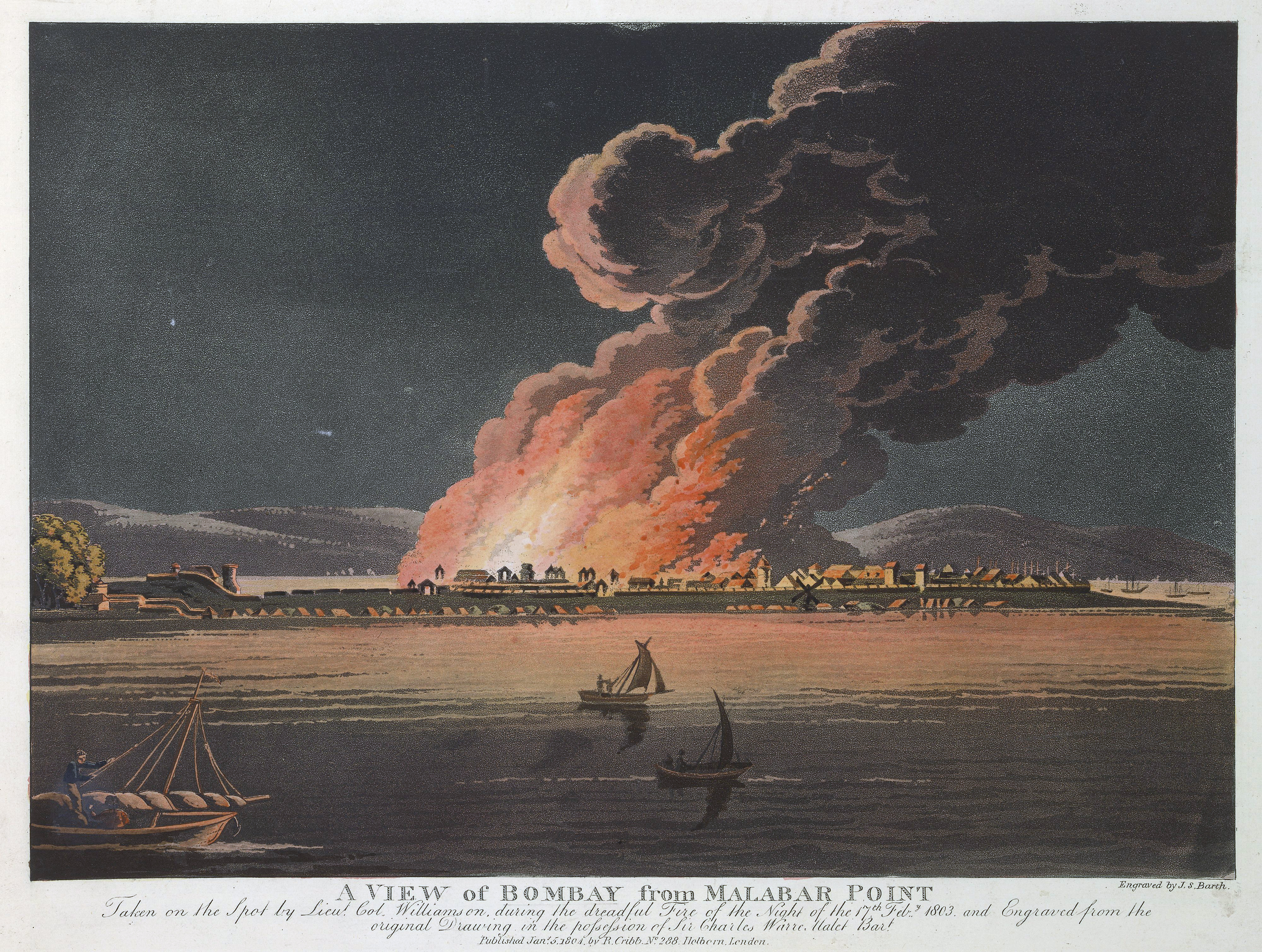
View of Bombay from Malabar Point during the Fire of 1803

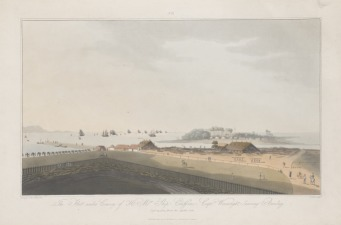
The fleet under convoy of HMS Chiffone, leaving from the Apollo Gate of Bombay, 1809

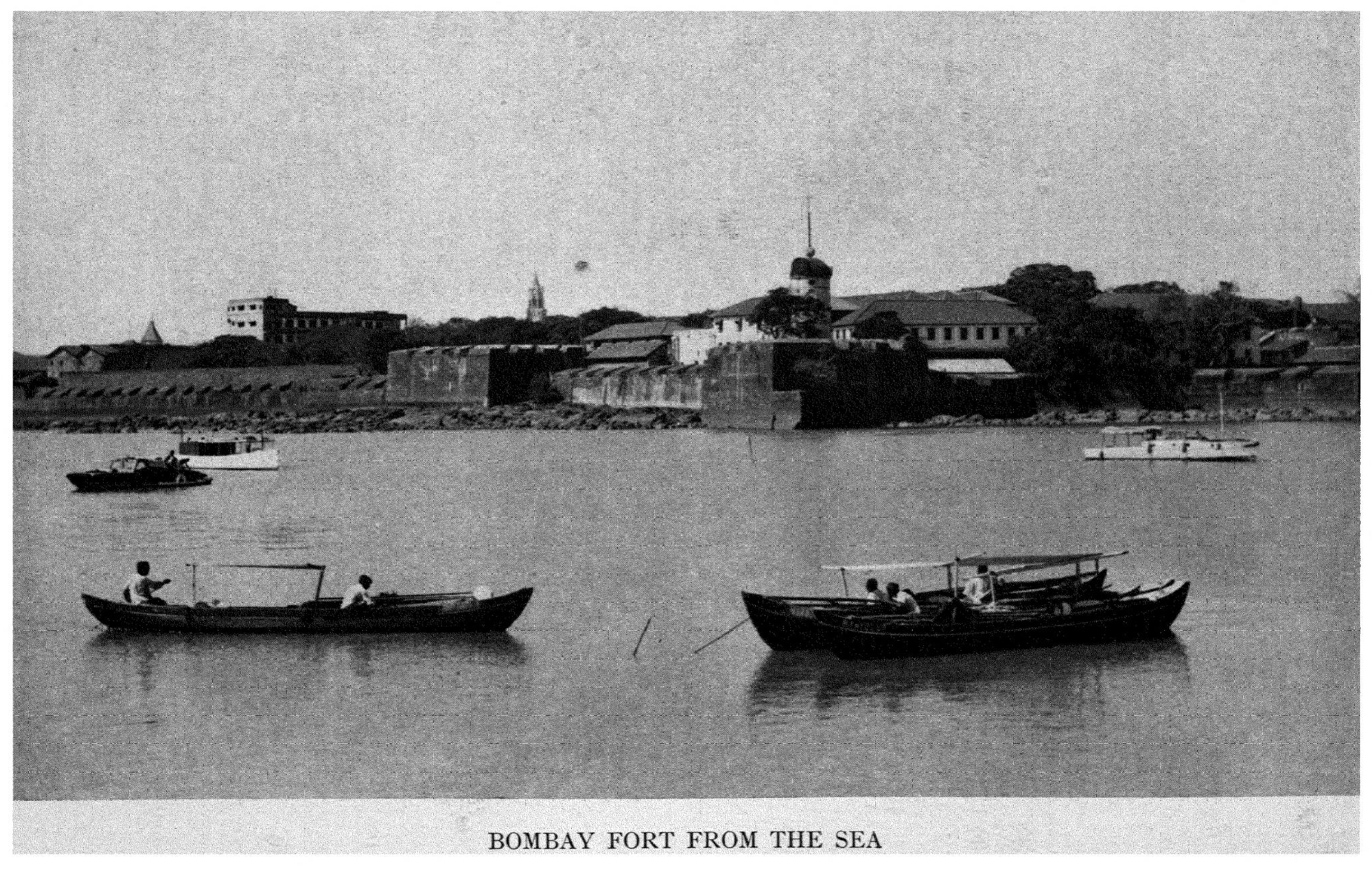
The Fort from the Harbour side

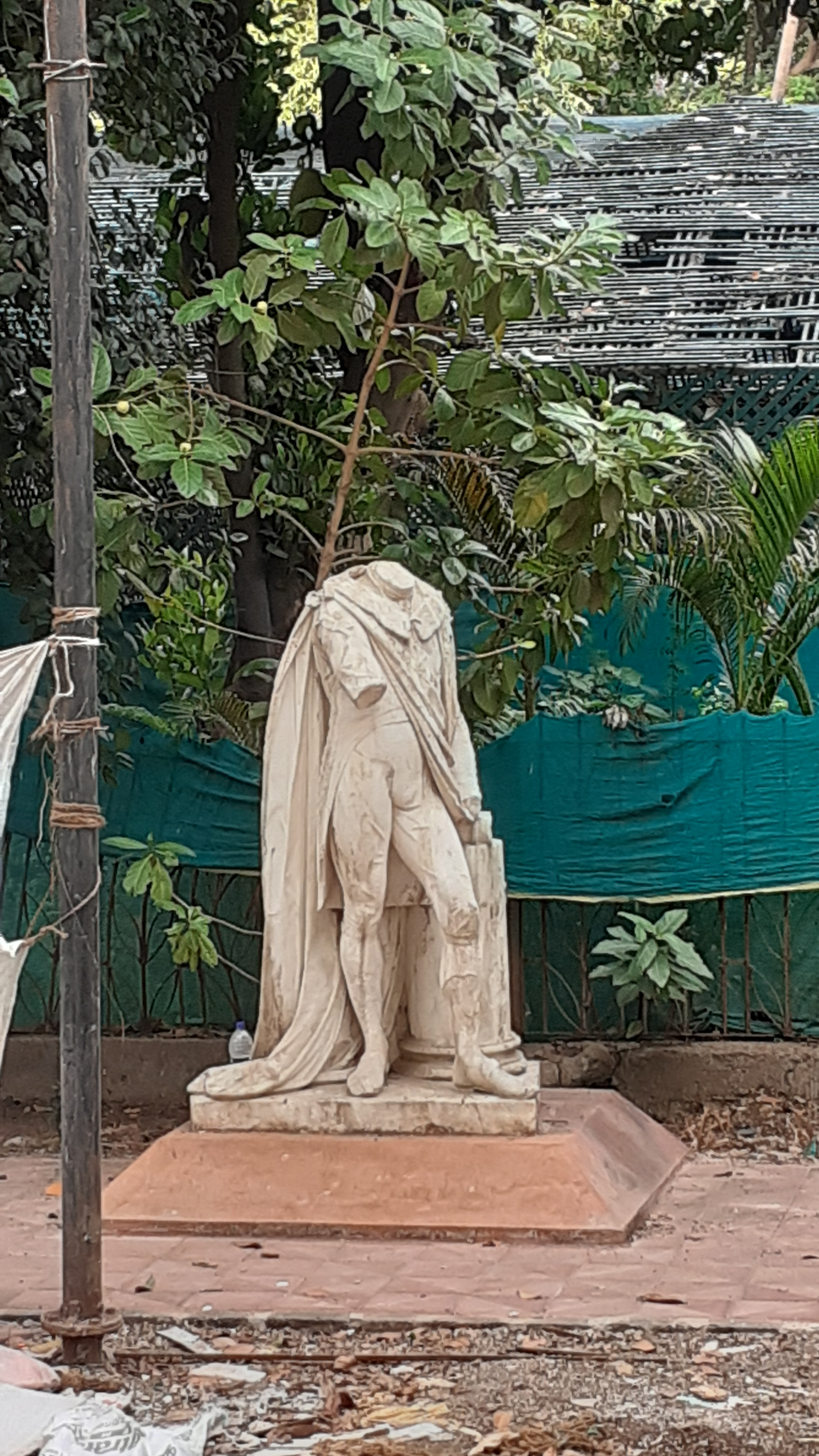
Statue of Marquis Cornwallis hau Daji Lad Museum. It was formerly located at Bombay Green.

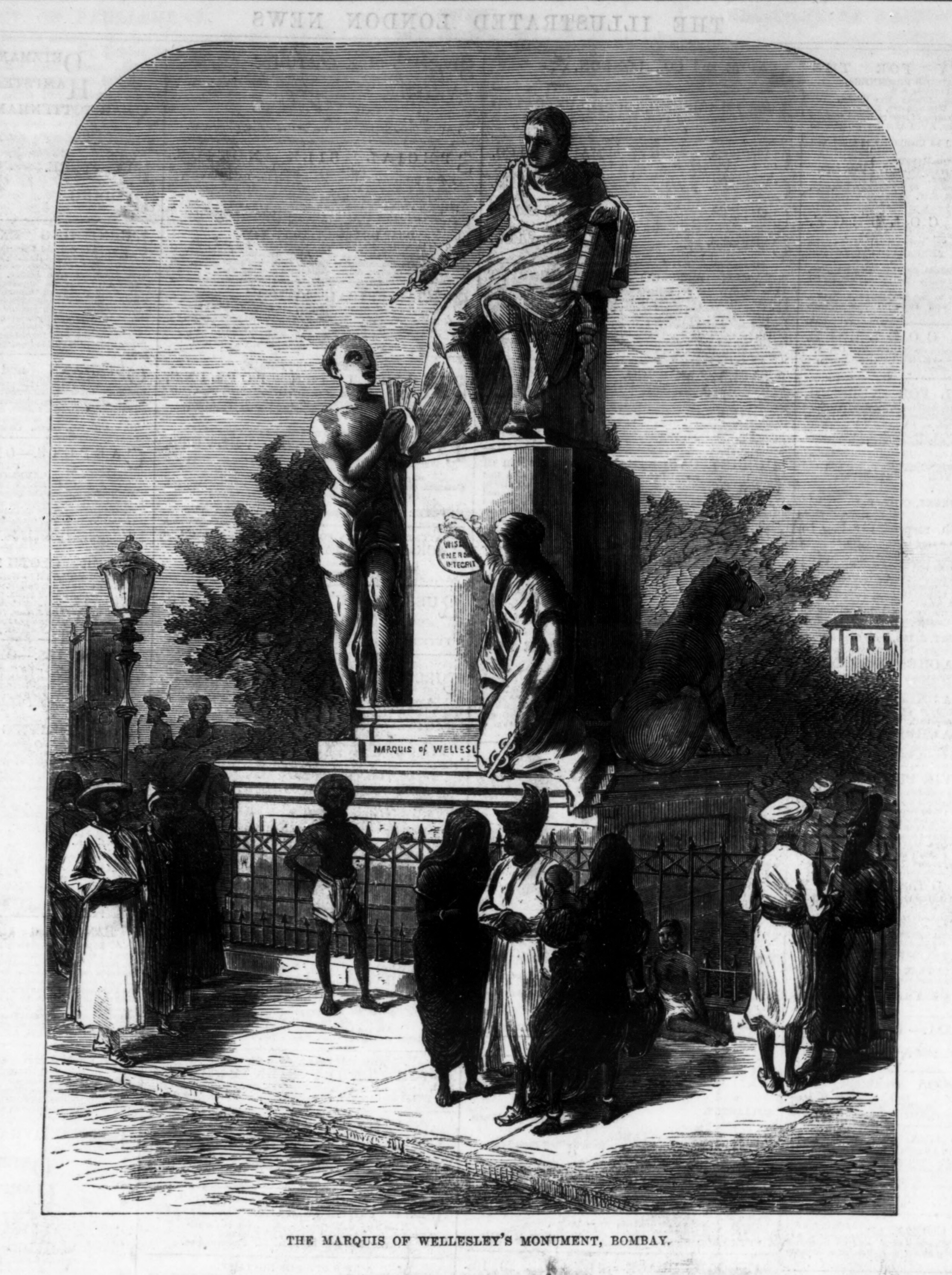
A sketch of the Statue of Marquis Wellesley outside the Churchgate (1875)

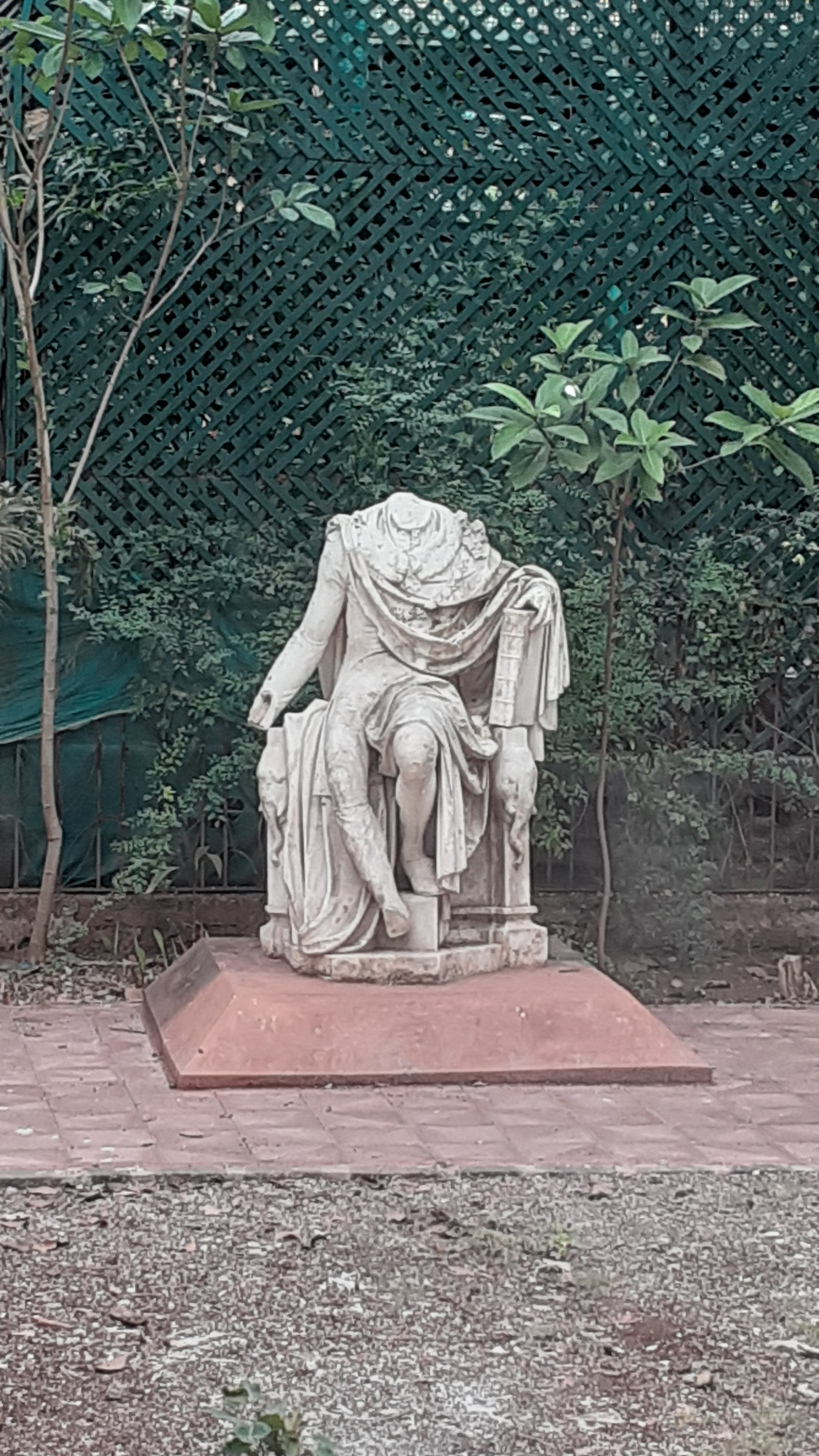
Present location of the same statue outside Bhau Daji Lad Museum.
