= Raymond West =

Irish-born British colonial judge

Sir Raymond West KCIE (18 September 1832 in County Kerry, Ireland – 8 September 1912) was a barrister King's Inns Dublin 1871, Puisne Judge of the High Court of Bombay, 1873–87; President of the Bombay Branch of the Royal Asiatic Society, Vice Chancellor of the University of Bombay, also acted as Procureur-General in Egypt 1884; member of the Government of Bombay 1887–92; Reader in Indian Law, Cambridge University.

In May 1888, he was made a Knight Commander of the Order of the Star of India (KCIE).
