= Horniman Circle Gardens =

Park in South Mumbai, India

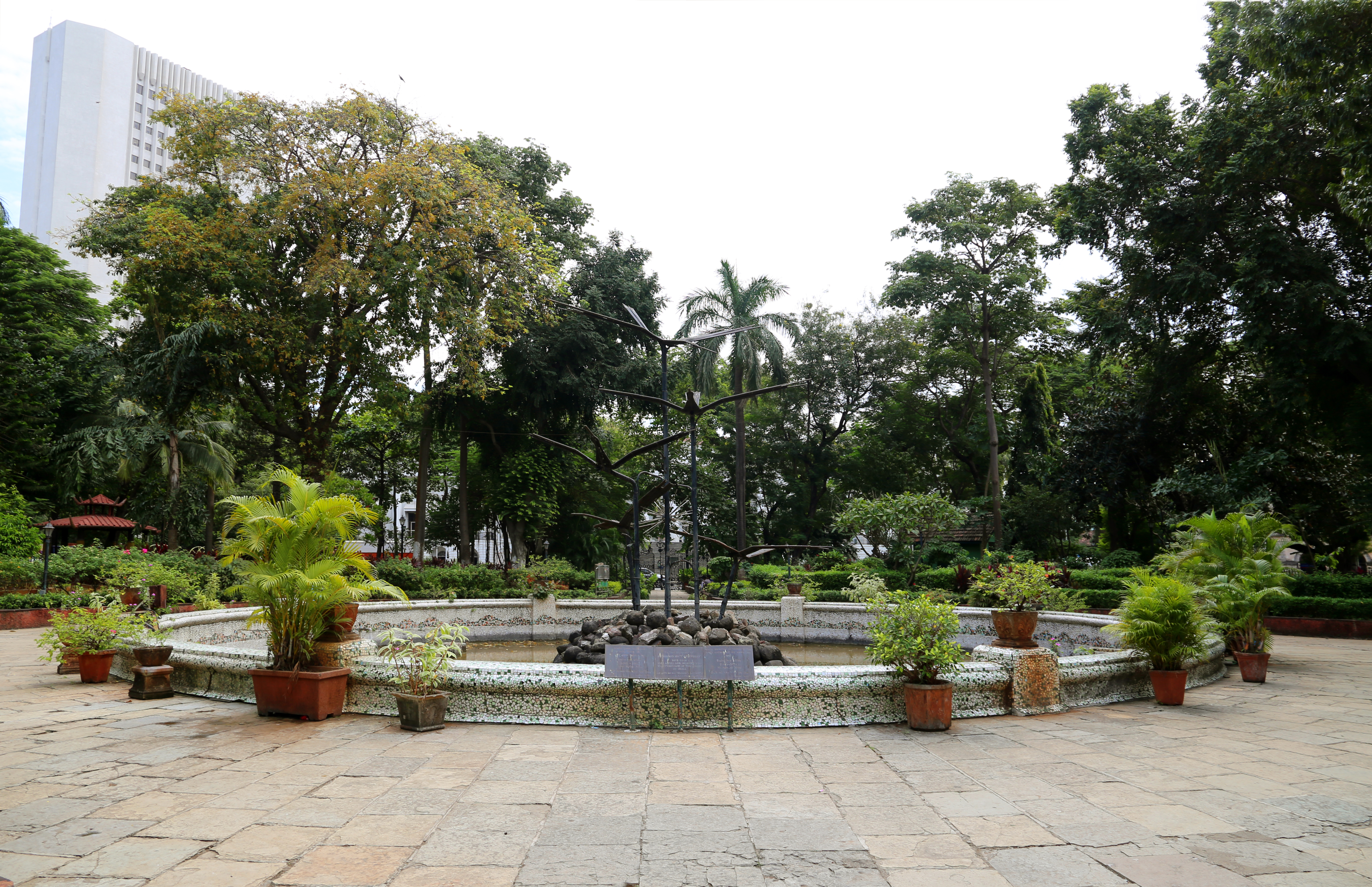
- Horniman Circle Gardens in 2019
- Interactive map of Horniman Circle Gardens
- Type: Municipal Park
- Location: Mumbai, India
- Coordinates: 18°55′55.5″N 72°50′4.04″E
- Area: 2.5 acres (1.01 ha)
- Created: 1872; 154 years ago
- Status: Open
- Public transit: Chhatrapati Shivaji Terminus; Churchgate

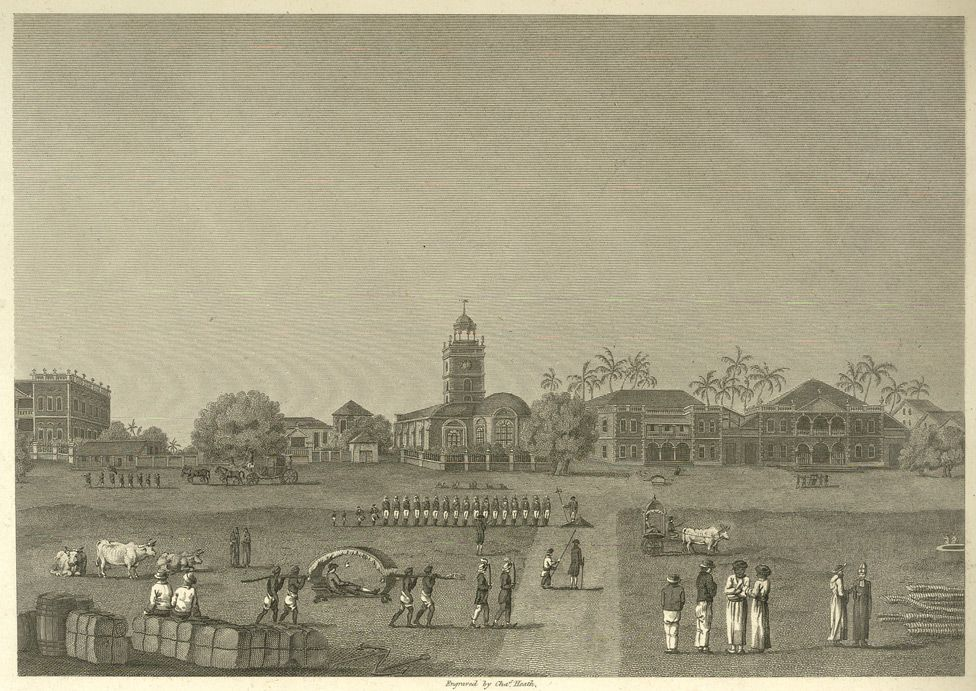
The area before development in 1767. Spot the St.Thomas' Church in the centre of the image.

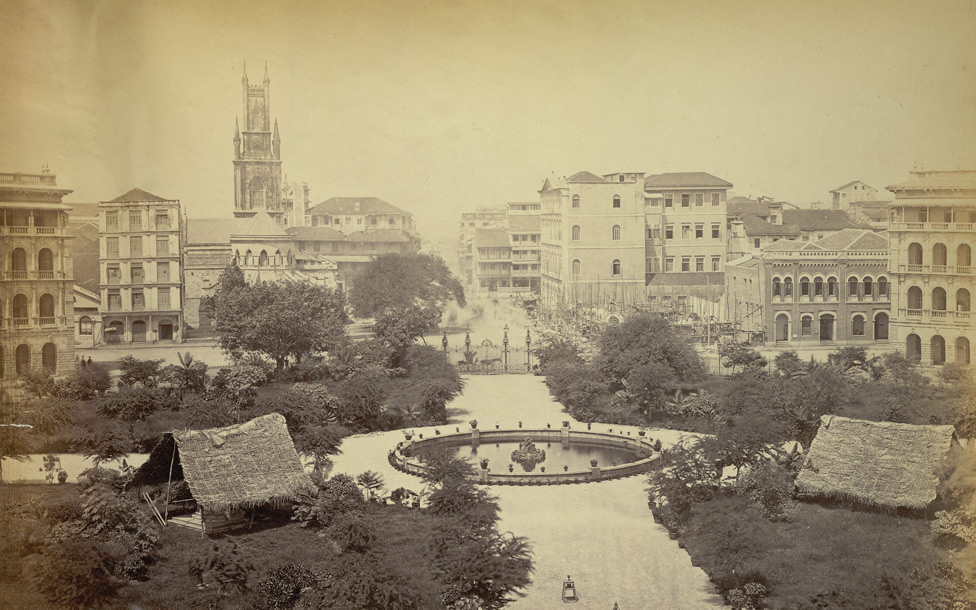
The gardens, then called Elphinstone Circle, in the 1870s.

The Horniman Circle Gardens is a large park in South Mumbai, Maharashtra, India, which encompasses an area of 1.01 hectares (2.5 acres). It is situated in the Fort district of Mumbai, and is surrounded by office complexes housing the country's premier banks. Designed to be a large open space with grand buildings in the middle of the walled city, the area had been known as Bombay Green in the 18th century, later Elphinstone Circle. Following India's independence in 1947, the area was renamed in honour of Benjamin Horniman, editor of The Bombay Chronicle newspaper, who supported Indian independence.

== History ==
The Horniman Circle was preceded by a vast circular expanse of land, called the Bombay Green. In 1842, the area had been just a dump of coconut shells and debris. It was described as a swamp during the monsoon, and a 'receptacle' of rocks in 'fine weather'. It was described in passing as "the mother of dead dogs in the monsoon, and of living ones in the hot season", and a "free coup for rubbish".

The Green was very popular among the residents of Bombay. It was said that no part within the walls of the English Fort of Bombay was so jealously guarded as the Green. A report from 11 April 1852 affirms this: A petition was sent by the residents of the city to the Court of Directors at London, against the erection of any building on Bombay Green. A copy of this petition was sent to "every firm or individual that knew Bombay". James Douglas, in his book Bombay And Western India ,1893, writes about the scene at night: palkhees, would be spread wide over the green, and 'hamals' would sing their 'see-saw' songs in a joyous night. The vast expanse of land would be referred to as 'Chowk' by the natives, probably due to its central location in the fort township.

At the centre of it was a statue of Governor General Lord Cornwallis, enclosed in a structure resembling a temple, which was installed through the effort of Bombay's residents, in 1822. It cost £5000. On its right and left were situated statues of Wisdom and Integrity. It was being put up on 14 October 1824. It was surrounded by a small courtyard, and trees were planted along its four sides. It was fenced with heavy metal chains. Due to a misconception, the statue was worshiped by the poor and the laborers as a god (known as "Gora Dev" or fair skinned god), a practice which the government tried to stop. The statue would later be removed, and was found inside the Elphinstone Circle, along with the statue of Marquis Wellesley (which was formerly located close to the Churchgate of Bombay's fort) in 1895. Both the statues (though defaced) presently lie in the premises outside Bhau Daji Lad Museum. (visit the gallery section)

During the Bombay Hurricane of 1837, the Green was submerged by waist deep water.

The Police Commissioner, Charles Forjett, thought of converting the Green into a circle surrounded by buildings. He was supported by governors Lord Elphinstone and Sir Bartle Frère. The garden was planned in 1869 and completed in 1872 with well laid out walkways and trees planted all around. An ornamental fountain was placed in the centre, but it was replaced by a modern art deco iron pipes design. The new circle was built north of the previous Bombay Green, aligned with the Town Hall and the Churchgate Street.

The Asiatic Society of Mumbai building (Town Hall) overlooks the Horniman Circle Gardens and the Reserve Bank of India. Close by, in Nariman Street lies the St. Thomas Cathedral, the first Anglican church in Mumbai, completed in 1718.

== Events ==
Horniman Circle hosts the annual Sufi and mystic music festival, Ruhaniyat. It is also one of the venues of the Kala Ghoda Arts Festival when several music and dance concerts are held at the park.

== Gallery ==
Horniman Circle

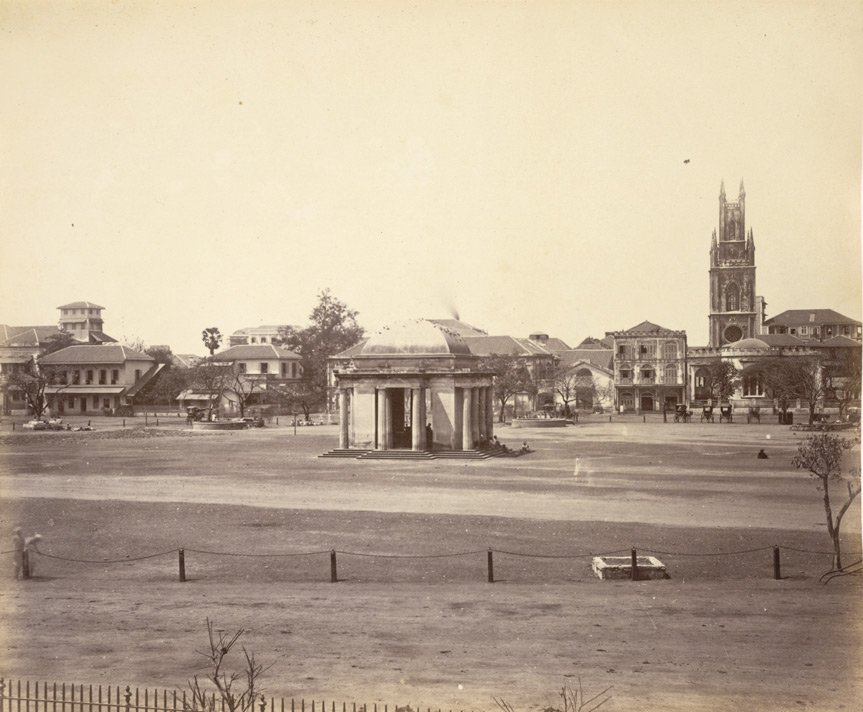
Bombay Green (c. 1860s) The Cornwallis monument can be spotted in the center.

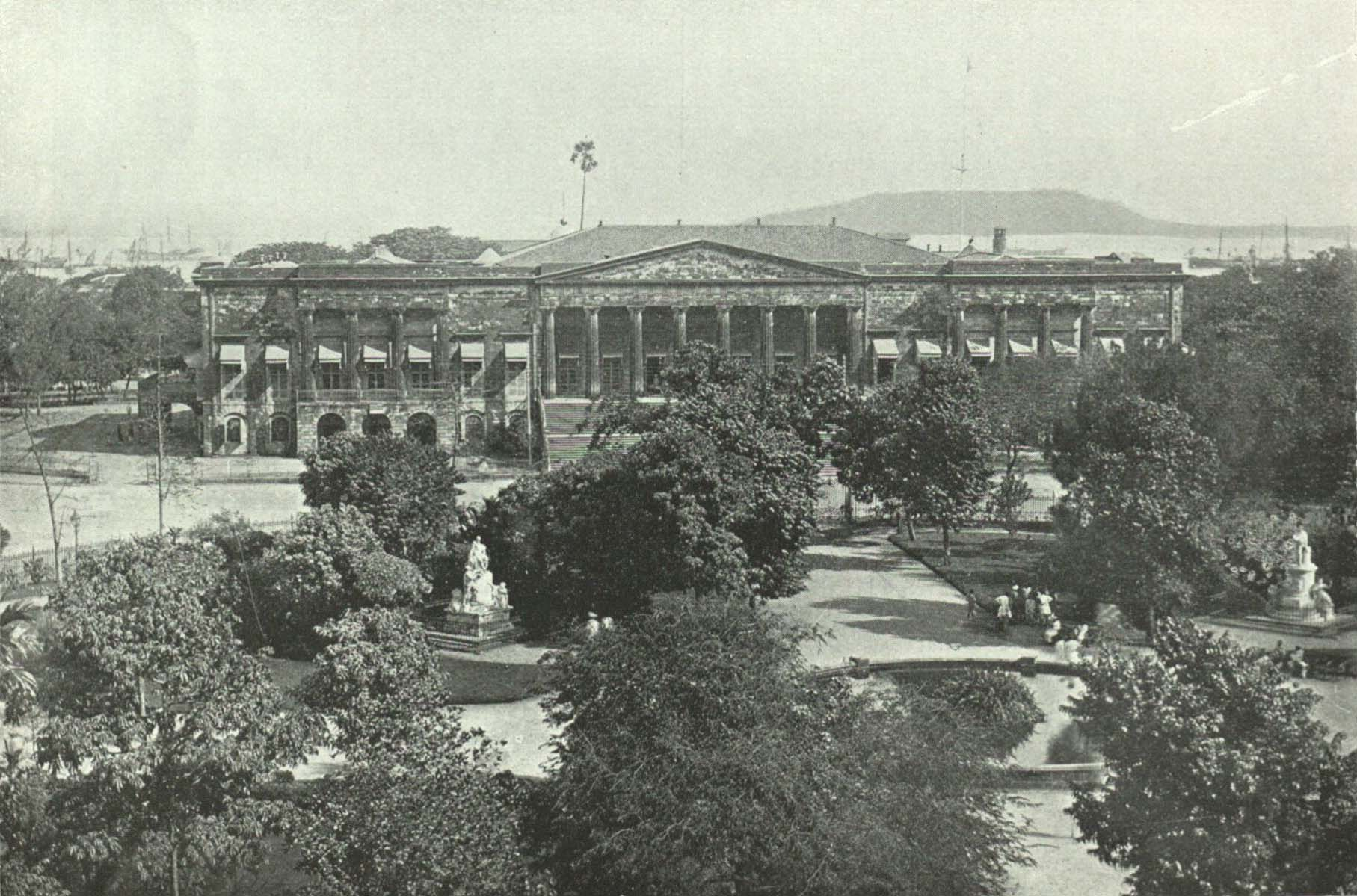
The Town Hall and part of Horniman Circle Gardens (c. 1905)

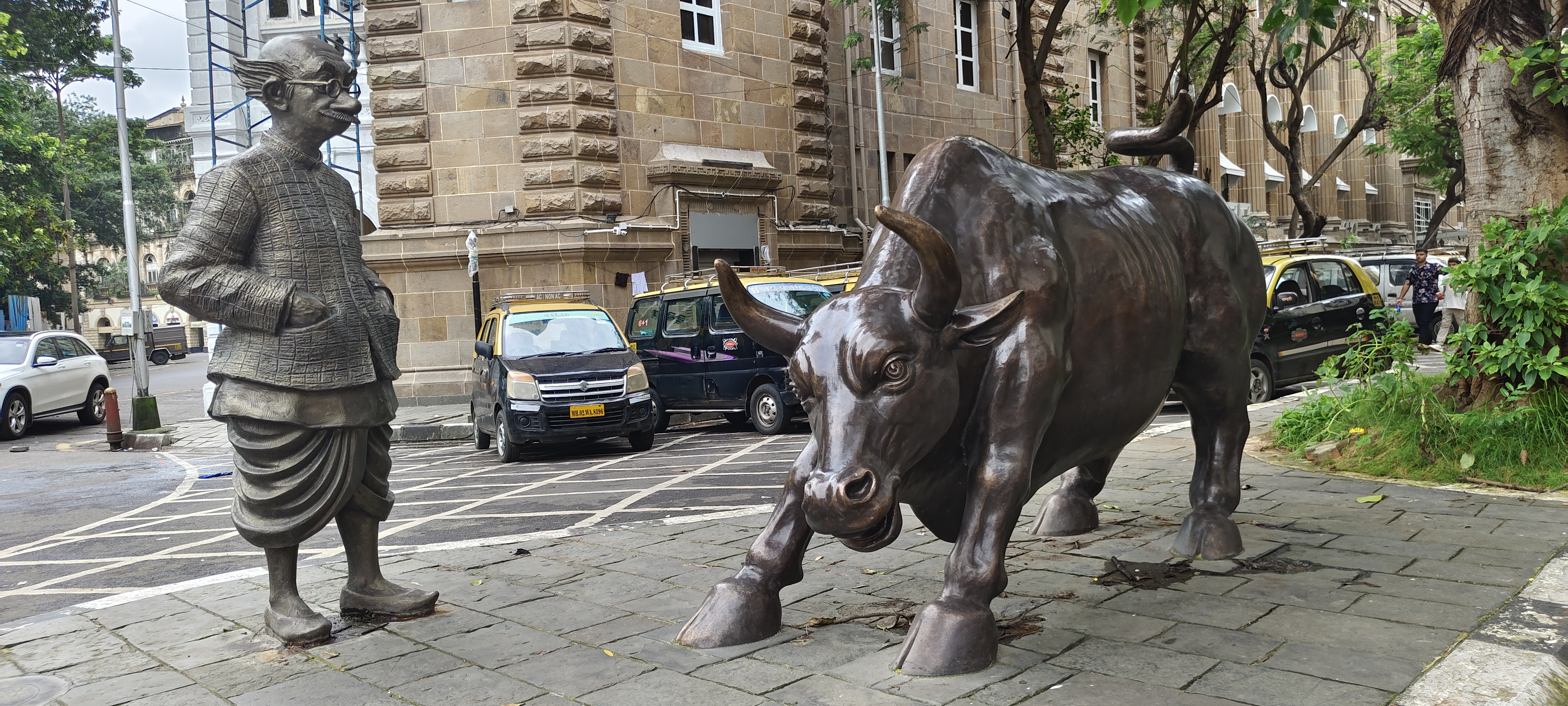
The BSE Bull, and the Common Man Sculptures near Horniman Circle

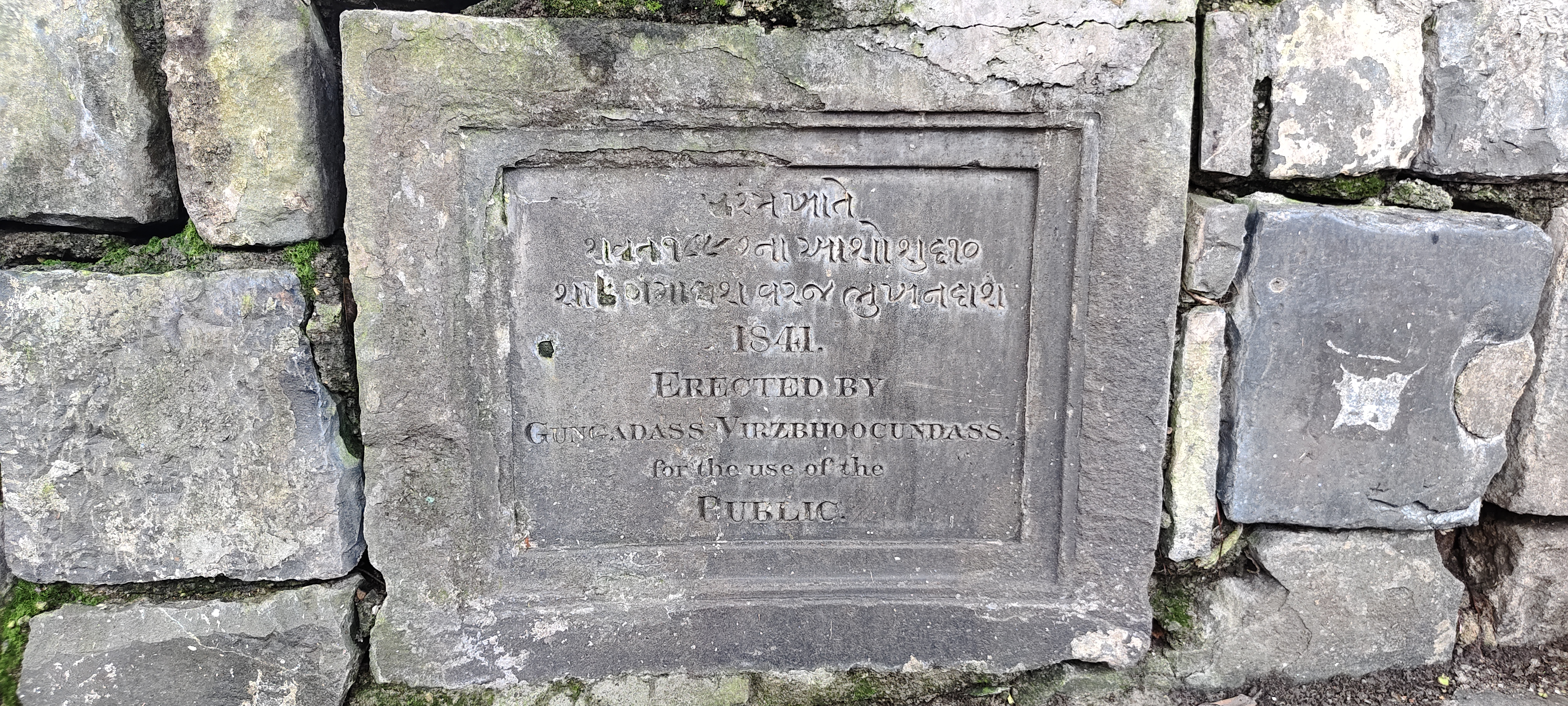
Plaque of the Resting place near Horniman Circle Pyau

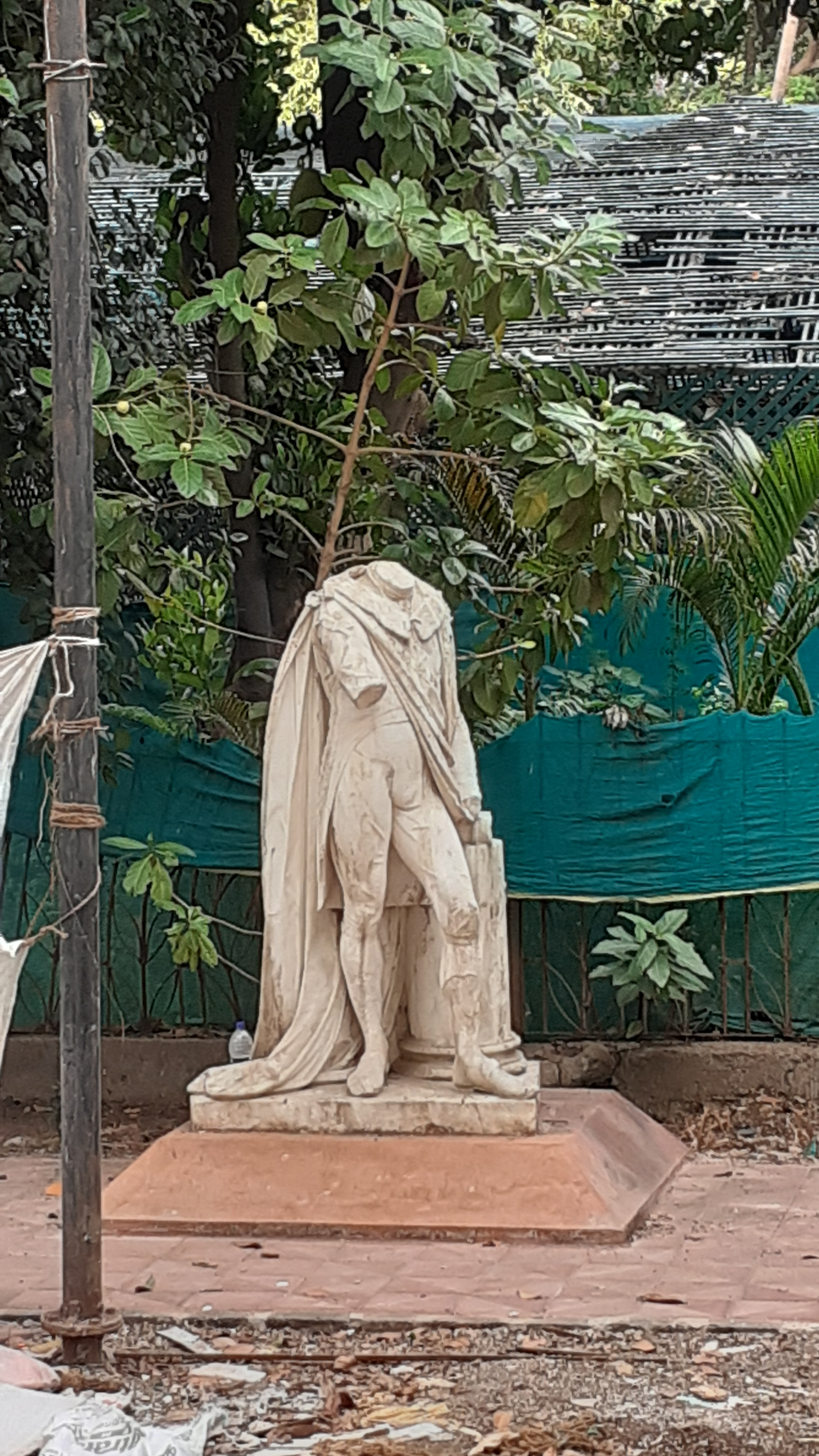
Cornwallis Statue at Bhau Daji Lad Museum
