= The Asiatic Society of Mumbai =

Indian learned society

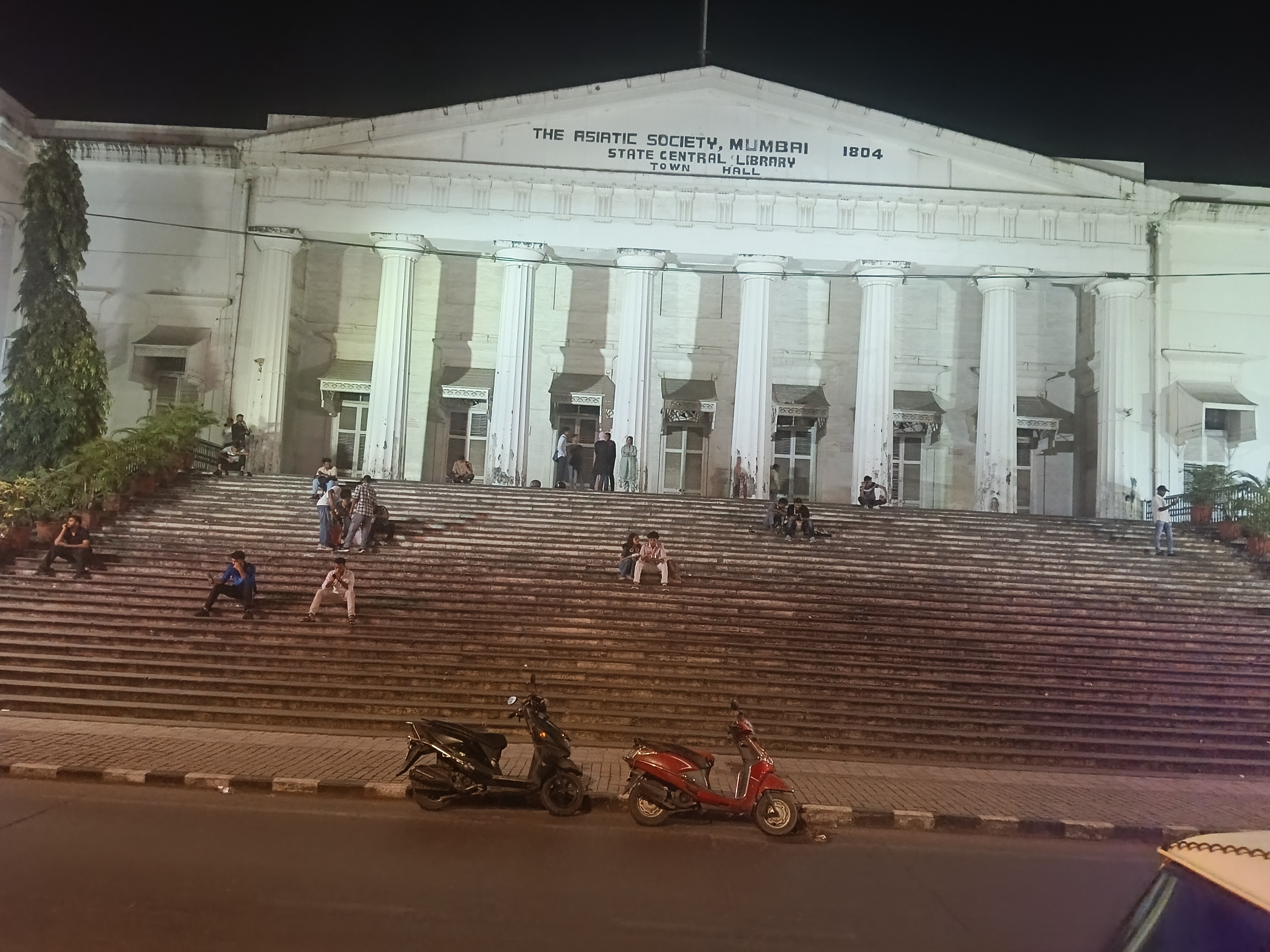
- Night view of The Asiatic Society of Mumbai

- Location within Mumbai
- Predecessor: •Literary Society of Bombay •Asiatic Society of Bombay
- Formation: 1804; 222 years ago
- Founder: Sir James Mackintosh
- Founded at: Mumbai
- Type: Learned Society; Literary Society
- Location: Town Hall, Shahid Bhagat Singh Marg, Fort, Mumbai, Maharashtra, India
- Coordinates: 18.931589°N 72.836131°E
- Members: 2649
- President: Prof. Vispi Balaporia
- Website: www.asiaticsociety.org.in

The Asiatic Society of Mumbai (formerly Asiatic Society of Bombay) is a learned society in the field of Asian studies based in Mumbai, India. It can trace its origin to the Literary Society of Bombay which first met in Mumbai on 26 November 1804, and was founded by Sir James Mackintosh. It was formed with the intention of "promoting useful knowledge, particularly such as is now immediately connected with India". After the Royal Asiatic Society of Great Britain and Ireland was established in London in 1823, the Literary Society of Bombay became affiliated with it and was known as the Bombay Branch of the Royal Asiatic Society (BBRAS) since 1830. The Bombay Geographical Society merged with it in 1873, followed by the Anthropological Society of Bombay in 1896. In 1954, it was separated from the Royal Asiatic Society and renamed the Asiatic Society of Bombay. In 2002, it acquired its present name. It is funded by an annual grant from the Central Government of India.

== Aims and objectives ==
The aims and objectives of the society when it was formed in 1804 were "to promote useful knowledge particularly such as is now immediately connected with India". Thereafter, on several occasions, some more aims and objectives were added such as encouraging the research studies in the language, philosophy, arts and natural and social sciences in relation to India and Asia, publishing journals, maintaining a library and museum, establishing institutes and centres which fulfill aims and objects of the society.

== Holdings ==
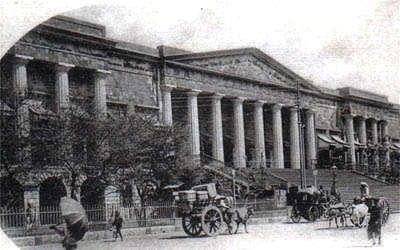
'The society in its early days'

The library of the society has over a hundred thousand books out of which 15,000 are classified as rare and valuable. It also has priceless artifacts and over 3,000 ancient manuscripts in Persian, Sanskrit and Prakrit, mostly on paper but some on palm leaf. The numismatic collection of 11,829 coins includes a gold coin of Kumaragupta I, a rare gold mohur of Akbar and coins issued by Shivaji maharaj. Its map collection comprises 1300 maps. The collection of the society include:

1. One of only two known original copies of Dante's Divine Comedy.
2. The manuscript of Vasupujyacharita (1242), a Sanskrit text on the life of the Jain Tirthankara Vasupujya.
3. The manuscript of Shahnama of Firdausi (1853), written in Persian.
4. The Aranyakaparvan (16th century) manuscript contains illustrated text from the Mahabharat and is written in Sanskrit.
5. Five Buddhist caskets excavated in the ancient port town of Sopara near the suburb of Nala Sopara.

=== The Divine Comedy ===
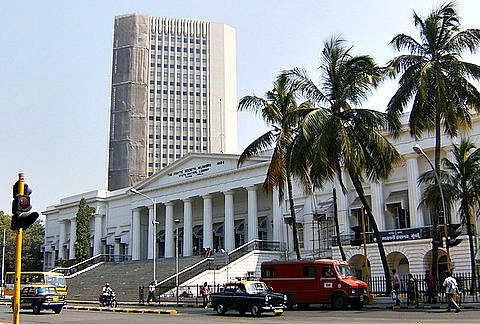
'Asiatic Library, Fort, Mumbai'

The manuscript of the Divine Comedy, a poem composed by Dante Alighieri in the 14th century, was written in the second half of the 15th century. It is a beautiful codex on parchment and richly illustrated. It was given to the society by Mountstuart Elphinstone, governor of Bombay and president of the society from 1819–1827 and bears his signature. It is said that, in the 1930s, the Italian government under Benito Mussolini offered the society one million pounds, calling the book a national treasure. Mussolini believed that the offer could not be refused, but to his shock, the society turned down his request, stating that it was donated by an ex-member of the society and hence it was their property.

== Functions of the society ==
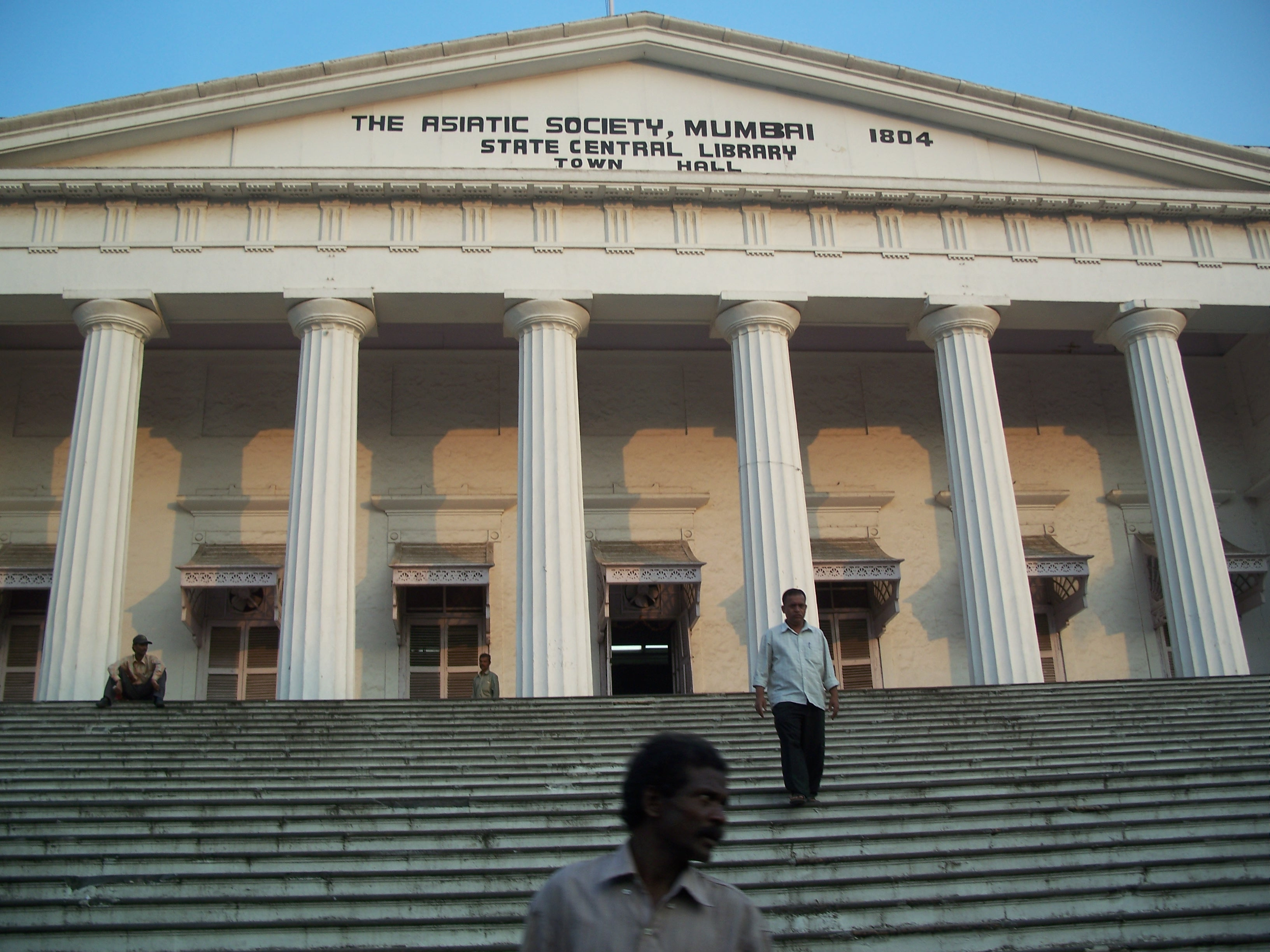
'Close-up picture of the building'

- Holding: Preserving, conserving, cataloguing and documenting holdings.
- Research: Generating supporting and disseminating research in its chosen fields.
- Public interface: Providing a forum for debate and discussions on topics of public interest.

The adopt-a-book scheme was recently introduced by the society which allows patrons to fund the upkeep of rare books. The society is financially in the red with a loss of Rs 1 crore (10 million). Due to the availability of information from the internet, membership has dropped significantly in recent years.

== Journal ==
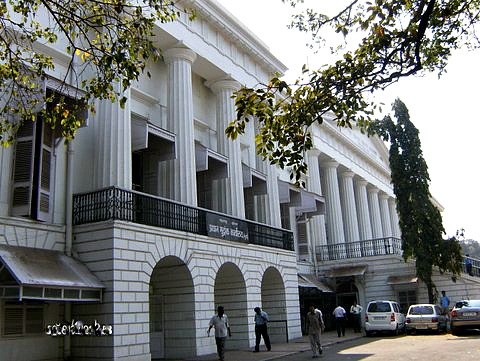
Located at Fort, Mumbai

Initially, the Literary Society of Bombay published its transactions under the title, Transactions of the Literary Society of Bombay. In 1841, the Asiatic Society of Bombay commenced publishing its journal titled, Journal of the Bombay Branch of the Royal Asiatic Society. From 1955 to 2002, it published its journal under the name, Journal of the Asiatic Society of Bombay and from 2002, its journal has been published under the name, Journal of the Asiatic Society of Mumbai.

== Digitization of collection ==
The society has undertaken digitization of all its collection, including books, newspapers, manuscripts, government publications, journals and maps and has made them available on the society's digital platform ‘Granth Sanjeevani'.

== Awards ==
=== Campbell Memorial Gold Medal ===
The Campbell Memorial Gold Medal was established in 1907 and is awarded to recognize distinguished services on the subject of Oriental History, Folklore or Ethnology which further the investigation and encouragement of Oriental Arts, Sciences and Literature.

The first winner was archaeologist Aurel Stein in 1908.

=== MM.Dr. P.V.Kane Gold Medal ===
Established in 1946, the medal is awarded for valuable research work in Vedic studies or in Classical Sanskrit with special reference to Dharma Shastra and Poetics.

=== Silver Medal ===
The Silver Medal is awarded to a member of the society who has written a book adjudged as the best in the given 3-year period.

== Town Hall ==
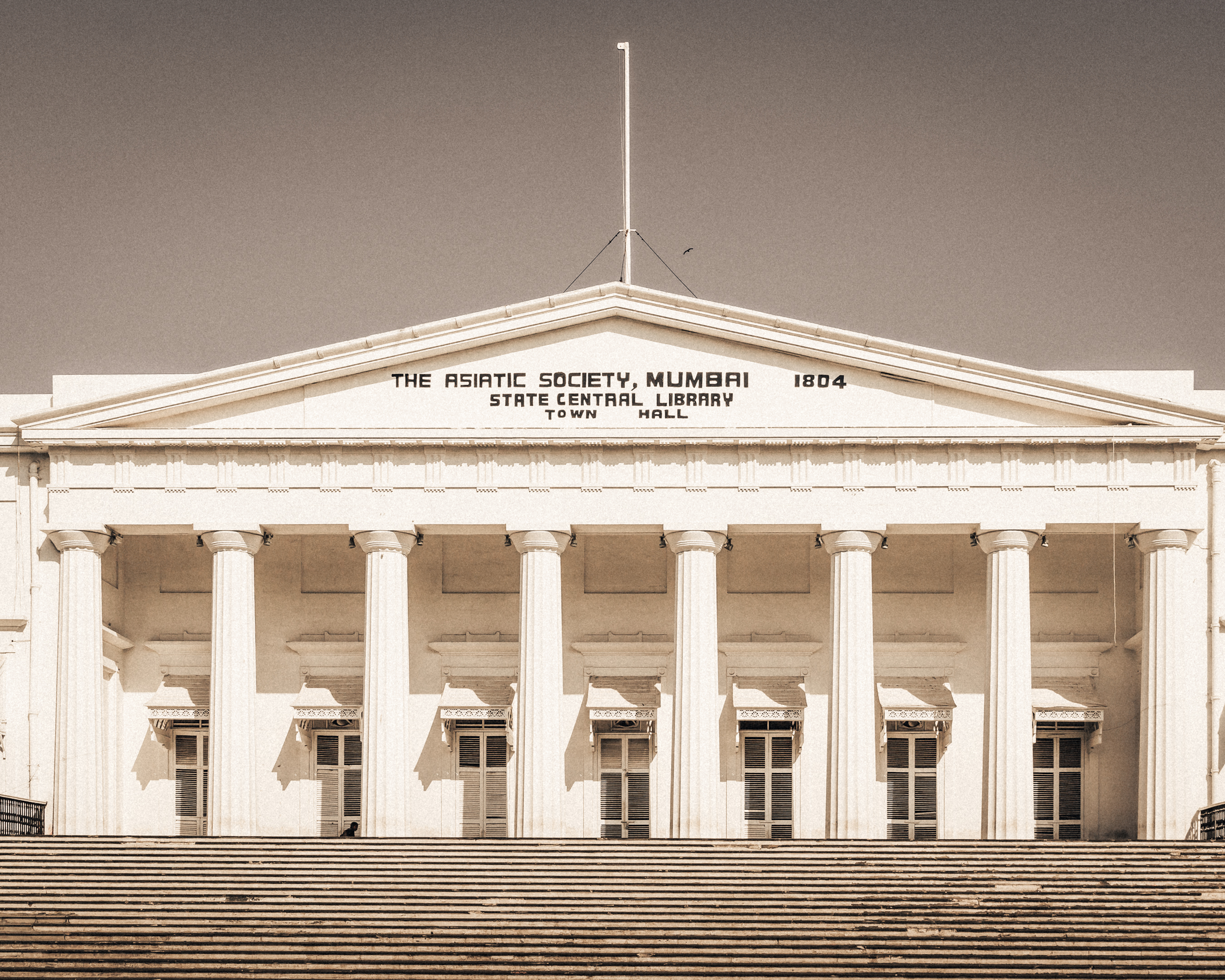
Town Hall Mumbai Building

The Asiatic Society of Mumbai Town Hall or just Town Hall (colloquially Called "Tondal" in the 19th century) that houses the Asiatic Society of Mumbai was not built in 1804, the year in which the Literary Society of Bombay was formed. Though Sir James Mackintosh mooted the proposal for a grand edifice, it was not completed until the year 1 after many fits and starts, when the Government of Bombay agreed to make up for the shortfall in funds in return for office-space.

Apart from the Asiatic Society of Mumbai, the building also houses State Central Library and a museum, Maharashtra Women's Association, and the Additional Stamp Controller Office.

The edifice is in the prime Fort area of South Mumbai overlooking the Horniman Circle Gardens and the Reserve Bank of India.

== Administration ==
The managing committee looks after the administration of the society. The managing committee consists of a president, Four vice presidents, an hon. secretary, who is also the chief executive officer of the society, and fifteen members who are elected from among the resident members. In addition to the elected members, the Central Government and State Government have one representative each.

In September 2019, Vispi Balaporia became the first woman president of The Asiatic Society of Mumbai in its 215-year-old history.

== Early presidents ==
Literary Society of Bombay (1804)

- 1804 Hon. Sir James Mackintosh
- 1811 Dr R. Stewart
- 1815 William Taylor Money
- 1818 Olyett Woodhouse
- 1819 Hon. Mountstuart Elphinstone (Governor of Bombay)
- 1827 Sir John Malcolm (Governor of Bombay)

Bombay Branch of the Royal Asiatic Society (1829)

- 1830 John Romer (acting governor of Bombay)
- 1831 Lt-Col Vans Kennedy
- 1835 Rev. John Wilson, FRS
- 1843 Hon. George William Anderson (acting governor of Bombay)
- 1846 Hon. Lestock Robert Reid (acting governor of Bombay)
- 1849 Hon. John Pollard Willoughby
- 1853 Rev. John Stevenson
- 1855 Hon. William Edward Frere
- 1864 Hon. Justice Henry Newton
- 1869 Hon. Henry Pendock St George Tucker
- 1875 Hon. James J. Gibbs
- 1881 Hon. Sir Raymond West
- 1893 Hon. Justice Kashinath Trimbak Telang
- 1894 Hon. Herbert Mills Birdwood (acting governor of Bombay)
- 1895 Hon. Justice Sir John Jardine
- 1897 Dr. Peter Peterson
- 1900 Hon. Justice Edward Townshend Candy
- 1903 Hon. E.M.H. Fulton

== See also ==
- The Asiatic Society
- Calcutta Historical Society
