= Asiatic Society of Mumbai Town Hall =

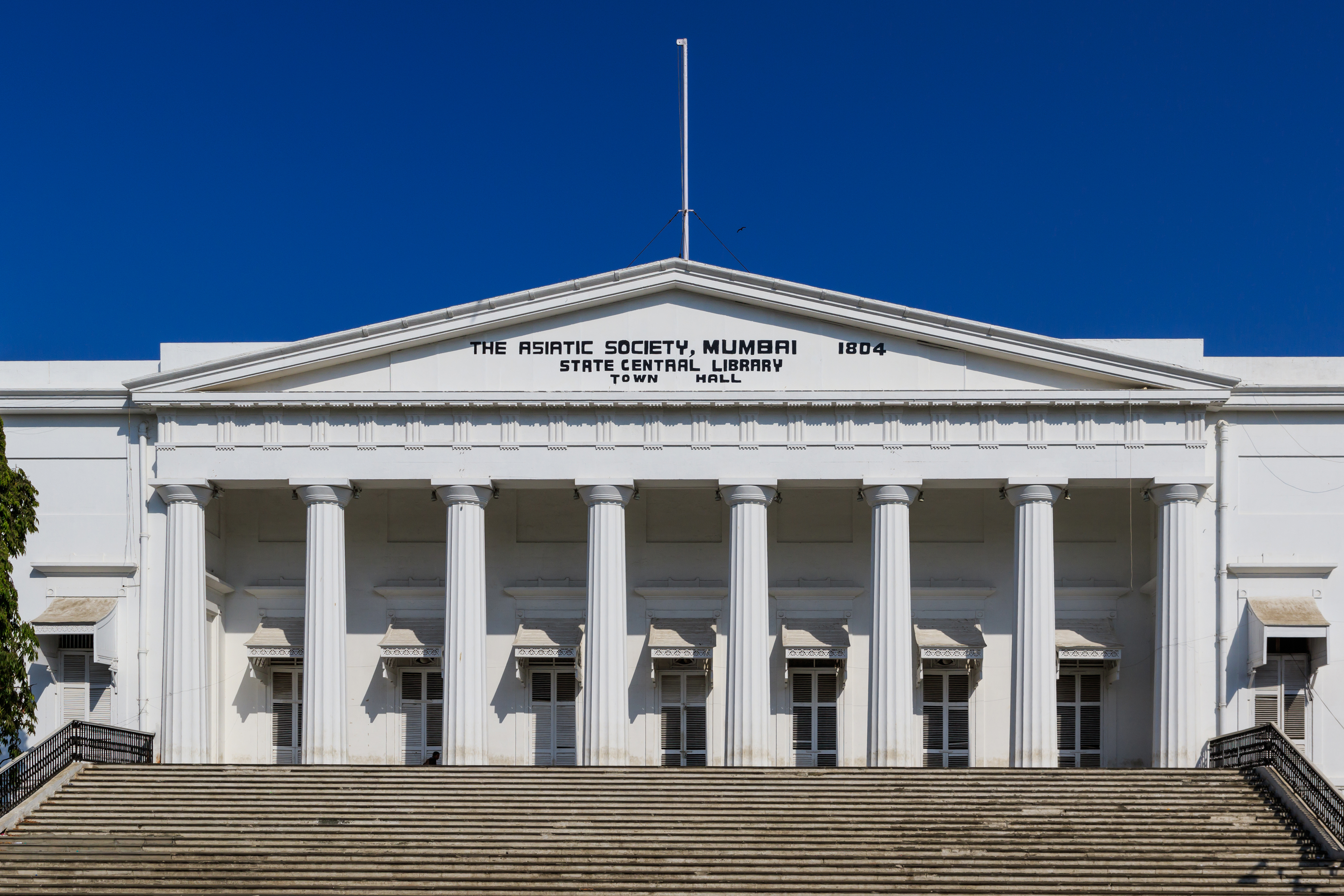
- Steps leading up to the pillars and entrance of the Town Hall building

- Location within Mumbai
- Alternative names: Asiatic Library Building, Town Hall

General information
- Type: Library and town hall
- Architectural style: Neoclassical architecture
- Location: Shahid Bhagat Singh Marg, Mumbai, India
- Coordinates: 18.931589°N 72.836131°E
- Completed: 1833

Design and construction
- Architects: Colonel Thomas Cowper, Bombay Engineers

Website
- asiaticsociety.org.in

The Asiatic Society of Mumbai Town Hall or Town Hall Mumbai is a neoclassical building located in the Fort locality of South Mumbai. It houses The Asiatic Society of Mumbai, State Central Library and a museum, the head office of the Directorate of Libraries Maharashtra State, Maharashtra State Women's Council, the Additional Controller of Stamps Office and a post office.

== History ==
In 1811, the plan for construction began. Initially, the construction of the town hall (colloquially Called "Tondal" in the 19th century) could not be completed because of the lack of funds; only the library and museum were built after raising an amount of Rs.10,000 through a lottery conducted by the 'Literary Society of Bombay' (Mumbai). Construction was eventually completed in 1833.

== Architecture ==
The building was designed by Colonel Thomas Cowper of the Bombay Engineers. The architectural style of the building is Neoclassical architecture that came into existence in the 18th century.

== Structure ==
The structure has a height of 30 m (98 ft) and a span of 61 m (200 ft). It was inspired by Greek and Roman styles of architecture. There is a flight of 30 steps leading to the entrance of the Town Hall. The entrance of the building is adorned with a Grecian portico and eight Doric styled pillars. The entire construction was made of stones brought from England and was designed in a Neo-classical fashion. Within the building are wooden floors, spiral staircases, and terraces adorned with wrought iron. The hall boasts of a collection of marble statues of Indian patrons of the 19th century.

There is also a flagpole on the building on which the Indian National Flag is hoisted on 15 August and 26 January every year.

== Significance ==
The Asiatic Society of Mumbai Town Hall is a classified heritage structure. Sir John Malcolm, Governor of Mumbai in 1930 said, "It is the most magnificent structure that taste and munificence combined have as yet erected in India".

There are many ancient manuscripts in Persian, Prakrit, Urdu and Sanskrit along with other treasures preserved in the hall. Dante's first issue of Inferno is one of the treasures kept at the town hall.

== Gallery ==
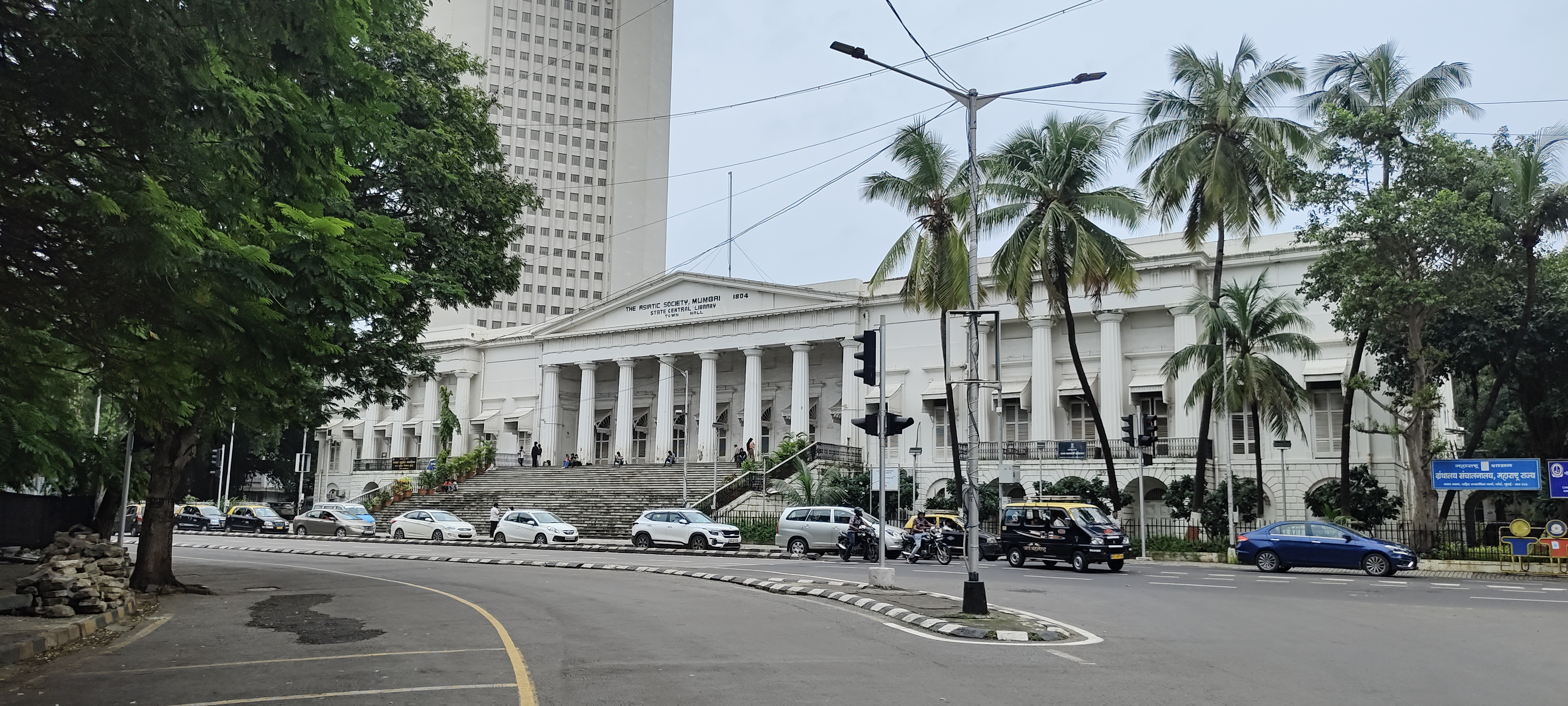
Town Hall from beside the Horniman Circle

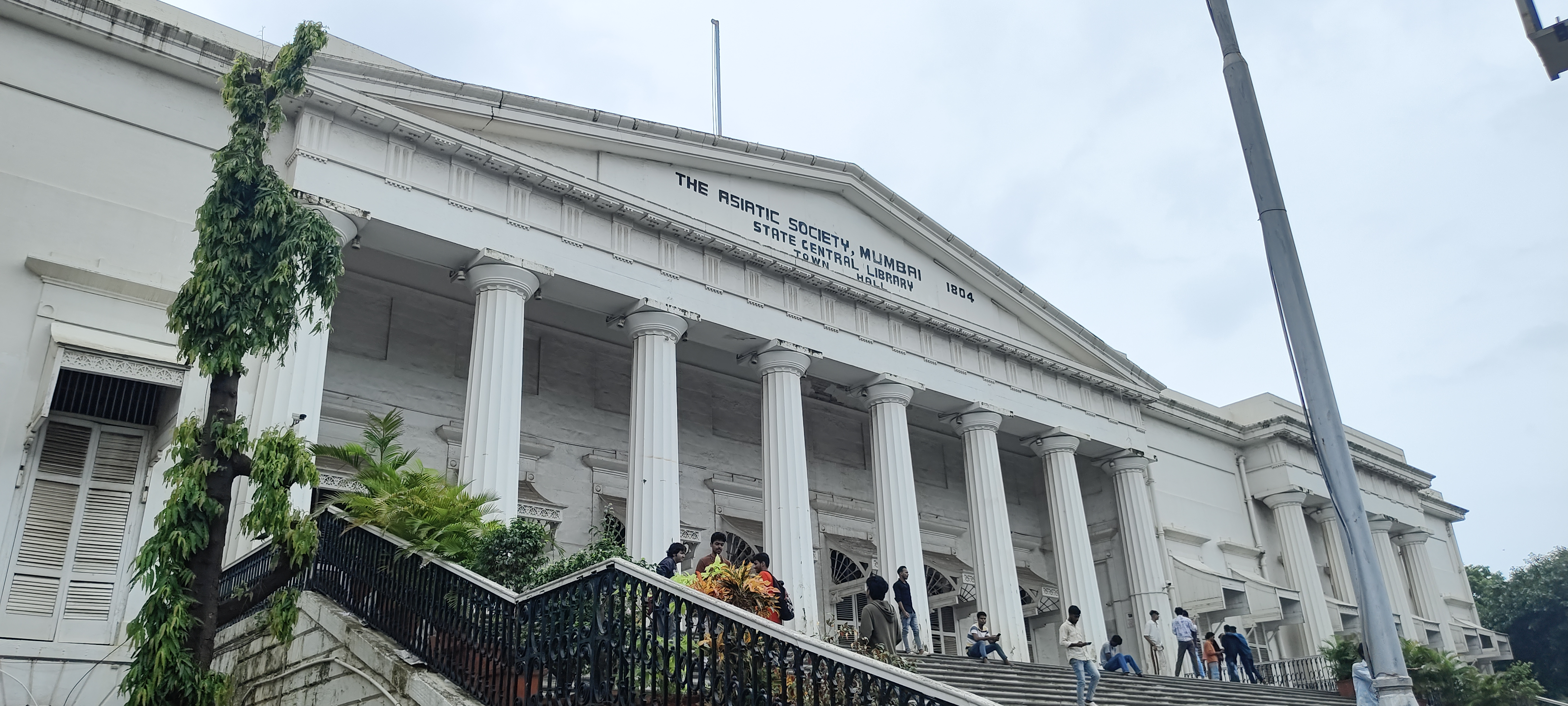
Town Hall- Oblique view

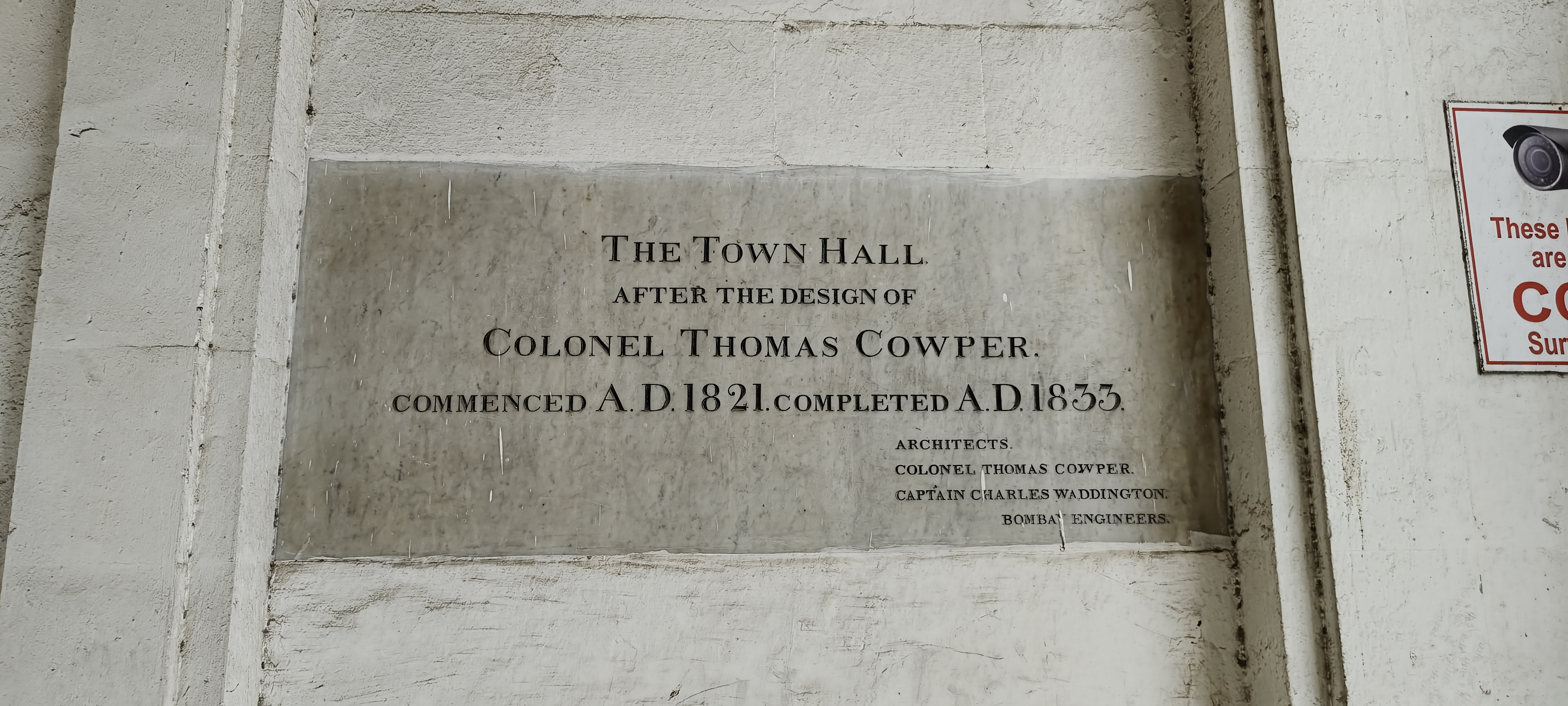
Plaque at Town Hall

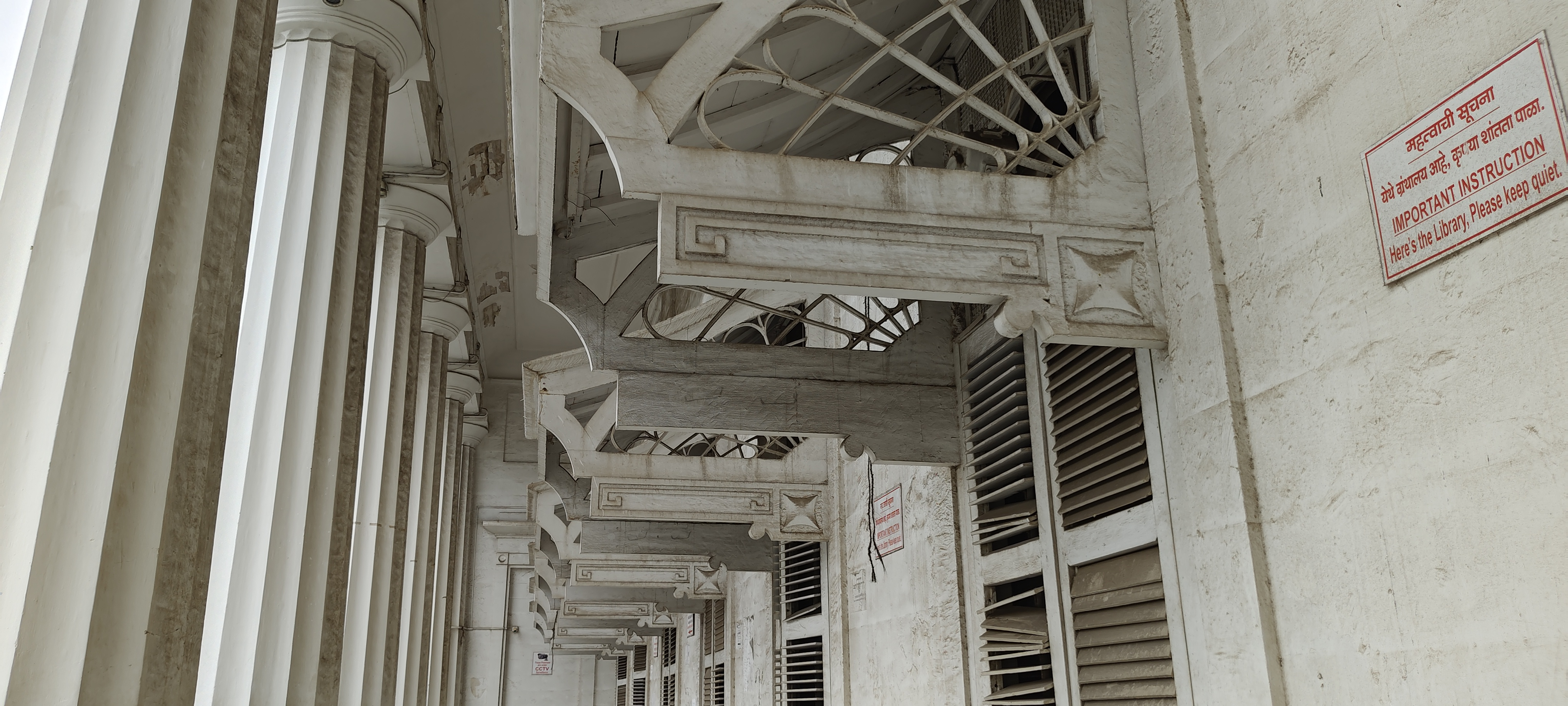
Pillars and Entrance at Town Hall, from within
