= Taha Najmuddin =

Indian Islamic leader (born 1975)

Shahzada • Syedi Taha Najmuddin
- طٰه نجْمُ الدِّين
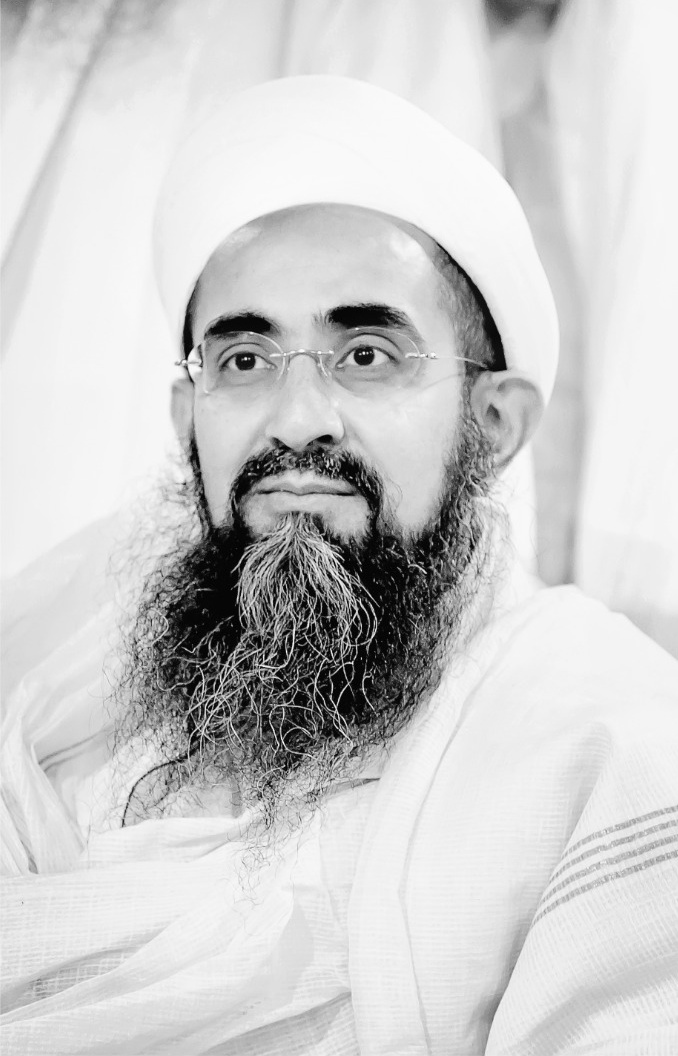
- Najmuddin in 2019

Personal life
- Born: Taha: 28 March 1975 (age 51); (16 Rabi al-Awwal 1395 ھ)
- Parents: Mufaddal Saifuddin (father); Jawharatusharaf Najmuddin (mother)
- Education: Aljamea tus Saifiyah
- Other name: Najmuddin (Laqab)
- Occupation: Professor Emeritus; Scholar
- Relatives: Jafar us Sadiq Imaduddin (brother); Husain Burhanuddin (brother); Mohammed Burhanuddin (grand father); Qaidjoher Ezzuddin (uncle)

Religious life
- Religion: Shi'a Islam
- Sect: Ismailism; Dawoodi Bohra
- Jurisprudence: Musta‘lī; Tayyibi

Shahzada Syedi Taha Najmuddin (Arabic: طٰه نجْمُ الدِّين) is the second son of Mufaddal Saifuddin, the 53rd Da'i al-Mutlaq of the Dawoodi Bohras. He is a Senior Professor in Arabic at Al Jamea tus Saifiyah and heads a number of socio-economic institutions of the Dawoodi Bohra community.

== Early life ==
Syedi Taha Najmuddin was born on 28 March 1975 in Mumbai, India. His primary education took place in Saifee Mahal, Mumbai under personal tutelage of his grandfather, Syedna Mohammed Burhanuddin Saheb and his father, Syedna Mufaddal Saifuddin Saheb . He attended MSB Educational Institute and graduated as Al-Faqih al-Jayyid (MA) in Islamic Fatemi Literature (Arabic: الفقيه الجيد) from Aljamea-tus-Saifiyah in 1996. He completed the memorization of the Quran in 1999 and is also a professor at Al Jamea tus Saifiyah.

== Lineage ==
Najmuddin's ancestors include Mir Mahamad Ali, Fakhr al-Din Shaheed, Abd al-Qadir Hakimuddin, Khanji Pheer and Syedi Lukman who were direct descendants of Ja'far al-Sadiq.

== Career ==
Syedi Taha Najmuddin regularly accompanies Syedna Mufaddal Saifuddin Saheb on his travels and oversees various socio-economic initiatives of the Dawoodi Bohra community. He administers the following departments:

- Sigah al-Yemen (President): Management of the affairs of community members in Yemen.
- SBUT Saifee Burhani Upliftment Trust (Vice-Chairman, 2014) - Bhendi Bazaar redevelopment project.
- Anjuman e Shiate Ali (Vice President) - Managing the affairs of Dawoodi Bohra of Mumbai.
- FMB - Faiz ul Mawaid al Burhaniyah - A global food initiative serving daily meals to community members.
- MSB - Al Madrasa tus Saifiya tul Burhaniyah - Community schools worldwide.
- Sigah al-KUN (President) - Pilgrimages to Najaf & Karbala.
- Upliftment & Fostership Programme - A campaign and outreach program which sees volunteers travel to cities and villages across South Asia and East Africa in order to uplift and foster critically low-income families within the community.

Najmuddin is also a signatory of the Amman Message along with his brother Syedi Ja'far us Sadiq Imaduddin.

== Recognition and awards ==
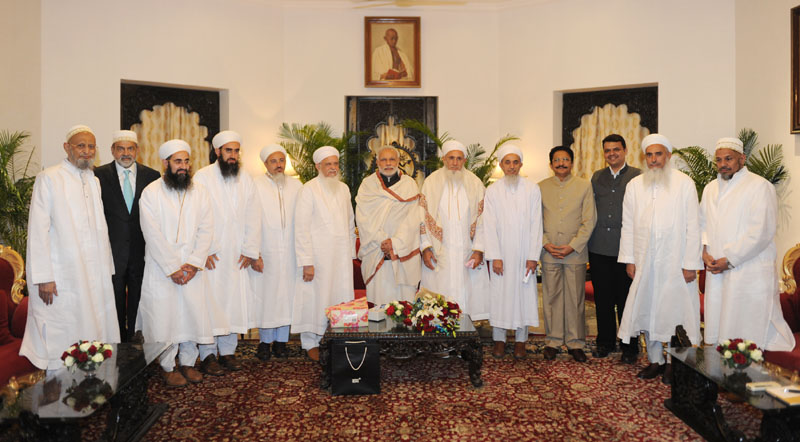
From third left (to right): Taha Najmuddin, Husain Burhanuddin, Ammar Jamaluddin, Qaidjoher Ezzuddin, Narendra Modi, Mufaddal Saifuddin, Idris Badruddin, Vidyasagar Rao, Devendra Fadnavis, Qusai Vajihuddin in Mumbai on 2 January 2015

- India: On 15 May 2015 (27 Rajab 1436 Hijri) - he was given the cognomen "Najmuddin" (Arabic: نجم الدين) by Syedna Mufaddal Saifuddin.
- India: He was conferred two of the highest degrees of Aljamea-tus-Saifiyah; "Thiqah al-Da'wah al-Taiybiyyah" (Arabic: ثقة الدعوة الطيبية; translation: The trusted of the Taiyebi Da'wah) and the degree of "al-'Aleem al-Baare' " (Arabic: العليم البارع; Translation: The Outstandingly Learned) on 3 May 2016 (27 Rajab 1437 Hijri).
