= Mahad al-Zahra =

Institution for the recitation, memorization and understanding of al-Quran al-Kareem

Mahad al-Zahra is the department and institution for the art of recitation and memorization of al-Quran al-Kareem in Al Jamea tus Saifiyah, established by Syedna Mohammed Burhanuddin.

== History of Mahad al-Zahra ==
The Mahad al-Zahra was first established in 1396H by Syedna Mohammed Burhanuddin. Its name is derived from the name of Fatima Al Zahra, the daughter of Muhammad and its aim was to create an institution for the art of recitation, memorization and understanding al-Quran al-Kareem and its sciences.

Syedna Mohammed Buhanuddin is quoted as saying: “I named It Mahad al-Zahra so that it may receive the barakat (blessings) and blessings of Moulatona Fatema al-Zahra, to whom this Dawat (call of guidance) is associated."

In 1407H a language laboratory was further incorporated into the Mahad al-Zahra in the Al Jamea tus Saifiyah campuses of Surat and Karachi. This served to facilitate accurate and precise memorization of the Quran and its studies using state of the art equipment to facilitate a conducive atmosphere. It also served to improve the quality of recitation through training in tenor control and enhancement. On 19 November 1998 (29 Rajab 1419 Hijri), the Mahad al-Zahra further expanded by constructing a larger institution in Surat.

== Overview ==
Today, the Mahad al-Zahra is established in Dawoodi Bohra centres worldwide including Mumbai, Karachi, Nairobi, Marol, Mumbai, United States, United Arab Emirates, Kuwait. It also carries out training through schools, online e-learning programs, and summer camps.

Along with Quranic studies, Mahad al-Zahra also undertakes poetry and recitation programs such as Saut al-Iman (established in 1400H), and is the head office for Al Jamea tus Saifiyah Publications.

The 53rd incumbent Da'i al-Mutlaq, Syedna Mufaddal Saifuddin's son Husain Burhanuddin has headed the Mahad al-Zahra from 1418H till date.
