= Husain Burhanuddin =

Indian Qari and Islamic Scholar

Shahzada • Syedi Husain Burhanuddin
- حُـسـين بـُرهانُ ٱلدِّيـن
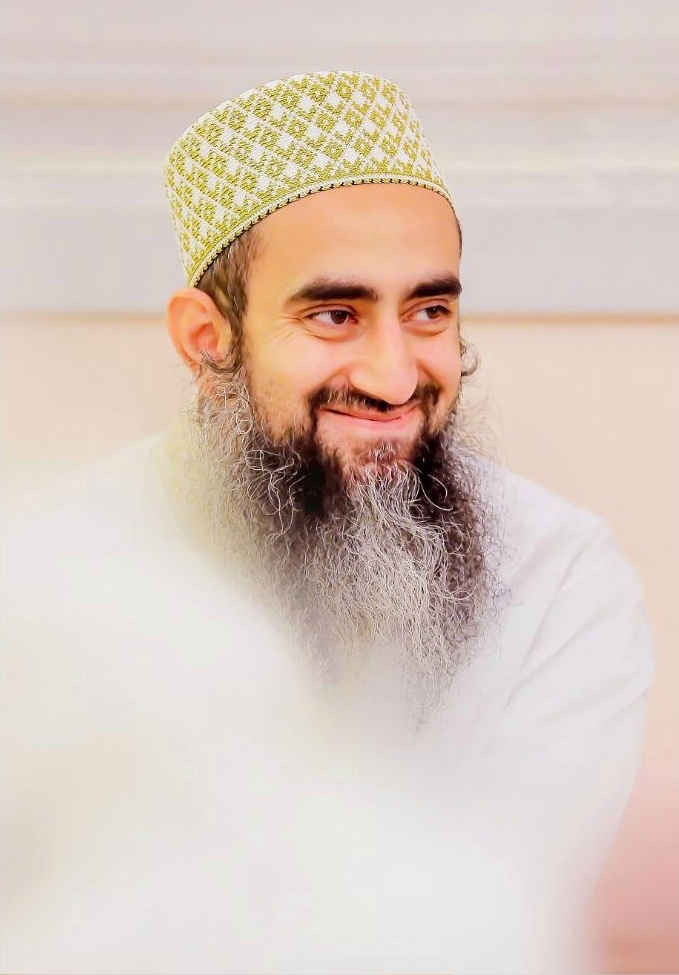
- Burhanuddin in 2019

Personal life
- Born: Husain: 24 December 1977 (age 48); (15 Moharram 1398 ھ)
- Spouse: Naqiyah (née Shujauddin)
- Children: Zahra; al-Qaid Johar
- Parents: Mufaddal Saifuddin (father); Jawharatusharaf Najmuddin (mother)
- Notable work: Full list
- Education: Aljamea-tus-Saifiyah; Al Azhar University
- Known for: Recitation of the Qur'an
- Other name: Burhanuddin (Laqab)
- Occupation: Qari; Scholar; Author; Professor
- Relatives: Taha Najmuddin (brother); Ja'far us Sadiq Imaduddin (brother); Mohammed Burhanuddin (grand father); Qaidjoher Ezzuddin (uncle); Malik ul Ashtar Shujauddin (uncle)

Religious life
- Religion: Islam
- Sect: Ismailism; Dawoodi Bohra

Shahzada Syedi Husain Burhanuddin (Arabic: شهزاده حُسين بُرهانُ ٱلدّين, romanized: Ḥusayn Burhānuddīn, born December 24, 1977), also known as Husain Mufaddal Saifuddin, is an Islamic scholar and administrator in the Dawoodi Bohra community. He is the son of the community's leader and 53rd Dai al-Mutlaq, Syedna Mufaddal Saifuddin. He is the Chairman of Saifee Burhani Upliftment Trust.

Burhanuddin serves as a provost of Aljamea-tus-Saifiyah and heads Mahad al-Zahra, (Note: Mahad al-Zahra is an institution within Aljamea-tus-Saifiyah with exclusive focus on Quranic sciences.) a Quranic sciences institute run by his father. He also administers other socio-economic institutions of the Dawoodi Bohra community. Burhanuddin is a recipient of All India Council for Human Rights' Ambassador for Peace Award. He is widely revered as the Qari-e-Hind, a title that holds significant meaning and respect.

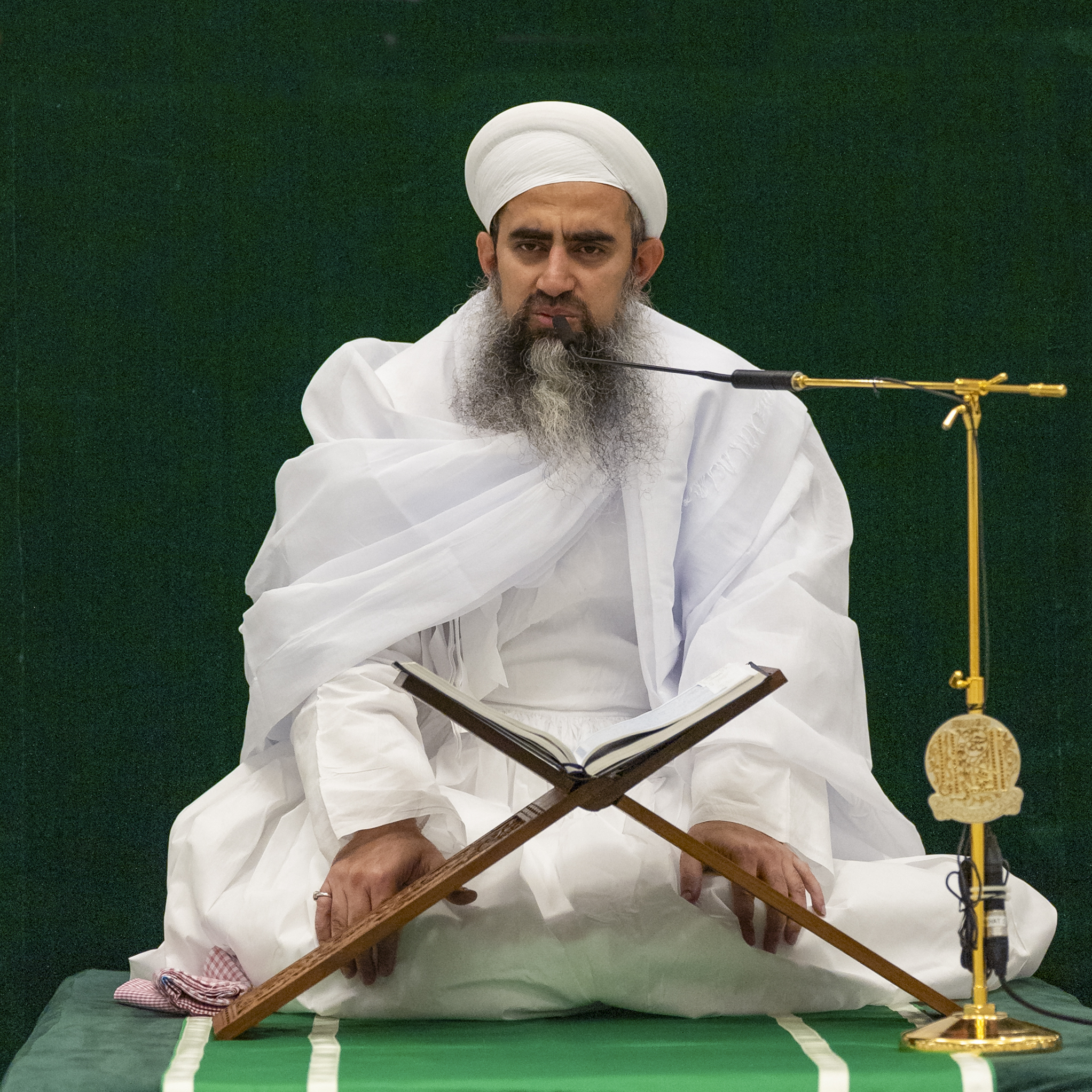
Shahzada Husain Burhanuddin is a certified Qari and regularly recites from the holy Quran before the commencement of sermons.

== Career ==
=== Early life ===
Burhanuddin was born on 24 December 1977 (15 Muḥarram al-Ḥarām 1398H) to Mufaddal Saifuddin and Jawaharatusharaf (née Najmuddin). He received his schooling at MSB Educational Institute in Mumbai graduating at the top of his class with high distinction.

=== Aljamea-tus-Saifiyah ===
Burhanuddin is a senior member of the executive board of Aljamea-tus-Saifiyah. He oversees the academic and administrative affairs of the academy. He also teaches at the academy.

=== Mahad al-Zahra ===
has led the Mahad al-Zahra's development. He focuses on Quranic science, recitation, and exegesis with a view to benefiting today's society. In order to foster a better understanding of Quranic arts and sciences, he has directed that Mahad al-Zahra distribute guides and booklets to Dawoodi Bohra community centers worldwide, among them seven installments of Khazāʾin Maʿānī al-Qurʾān al-Fāʾiqah, a series for the non-Arabic speaking audiences to gain an insight into the meanings of the Quran. (Note: Khazaa'in Ma'ani al-Quran al-Faeqah is a series of books published by Mahad al-Zahra.)

Burhanuddin's emphasis on audio-visual teaching to facilitate learning has accelerated Quranic education within the community: through its e-learning program, (Note: elearningquran.com is an online-only resource built to facilitate instant, global reach of Mahad al-Zahra.) Mahad al-Zahra has reached thousands around the world, who participate in virtual classes along with one-to-one recital sessions through video-conferencing, aiding huffaz as young as 6 years old.

As of 2024, more than 8 branches of Mahad al-Zahra have been established at Dawoodi Bohra centers in India, Kenya, Kuwait, Pakistan, Tanzania, United Arab Emirates, the United States, and Yemen.

As the head of the Mahad al-Zahra, Burhanuddin personally conducts the final oral examinations for the Huffaz (lit. 'guardians of the Quran').

=== Community Outreach ===
Under Burhanuddin's leadership, Mahad al-Zahra has become Aljamea-tus-Saifiyah's largest avenue of community outreach. Over the past two decades, the department has extended access to Quranic education to members of the Dawoodi Bohra community through educational institutions established across the globe.

Burhanuddin frequently visits global Dawoodi Bohra community centers to encourage accurate recitation of the Quran and facilitate its memorization. Between 2007 and 2011, Burhanuddin conducted 3-day workshops designed to motivate and teach participants Quran memorization techniques.

Burhanuddin has initiated an annual outreach where ḥuffāẓ are sent all over the world during the month of Ramadān al-Muʿazzam, to conduct classes that help adults and children recite and memorize the Quran.

Burhanuddin called on Narendra Modi in August 2019 and November 2020, at the Prime Minister's office to discuss on various projects and initiatives by the Dawoodi Bohra community.

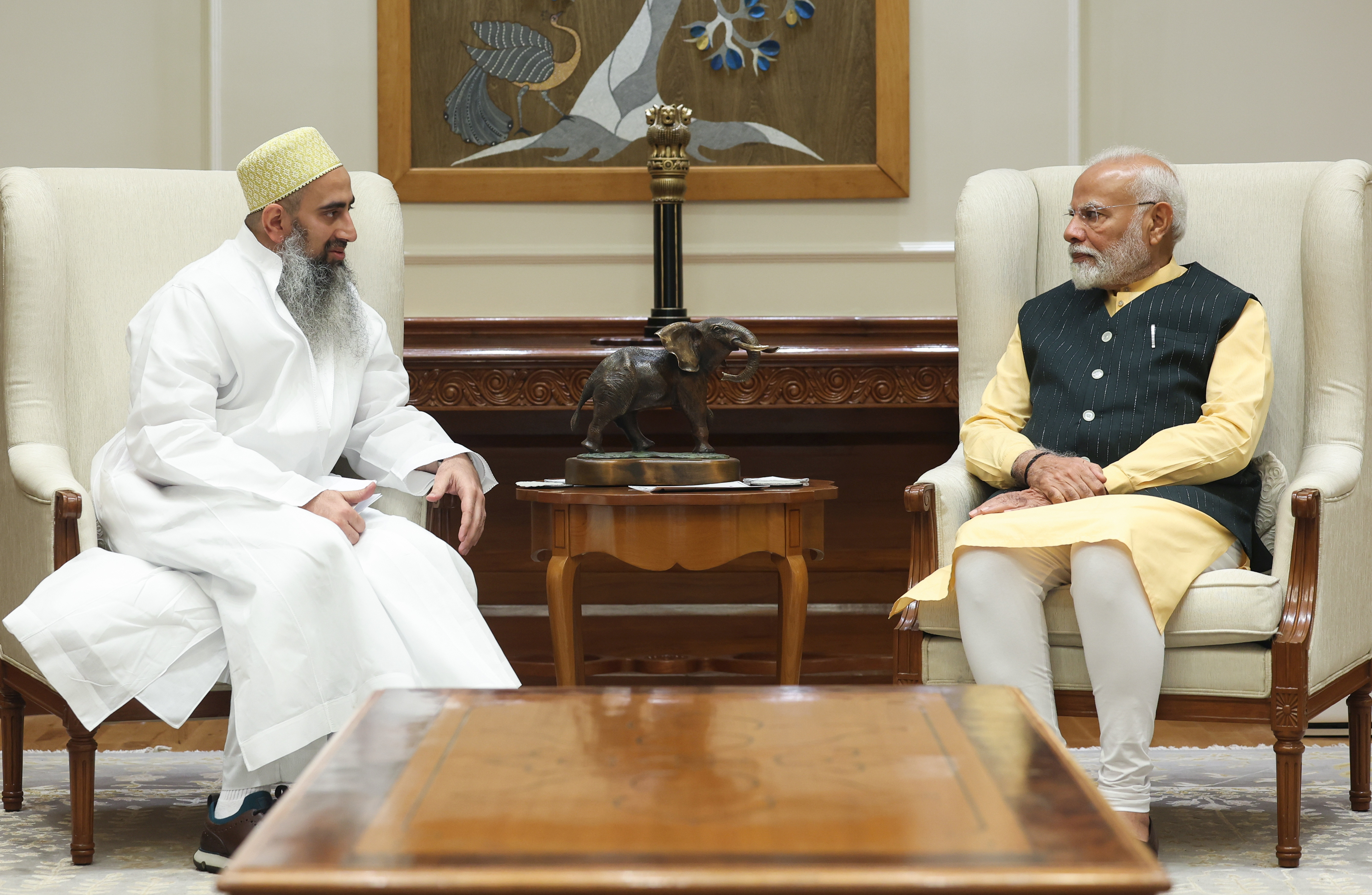
Shahzada Husain Burhanuddin meets with the Prime Minister of India, Shri Narendra Modi in Prime Minister's Office, New Delhi.

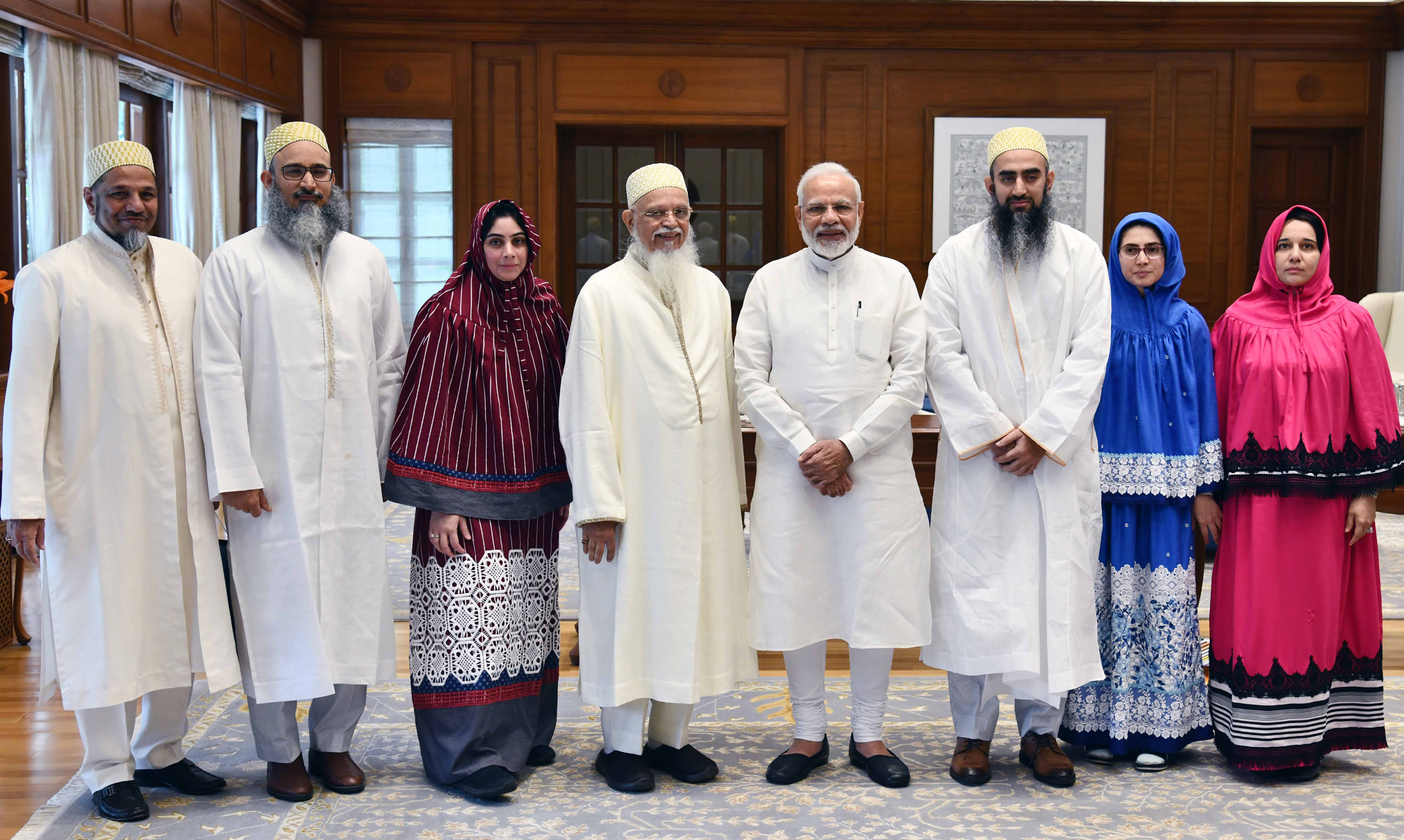
From third left (to right): Naqiyah Burhanuddin, Qaidjoher Ezzuddin, Narendra Modi, and Husain Burhanuddin on 16 August 2019 at the Prime Minister's Office, New Delhi.

During the Narendra Modi's visit to Egypt in June 2023, Burhanuddin welcomed him to the Al Hakim Mosque, the renovation of which was led by his father, Mufaddal Saifuddin.

=== Quranic studies ===
Burhanuddin dedicated his entire teenage years to rote-memorizing the Quran. By 1995 (1416H), when he was 18 years old, he had completed memorizing the Quran. Three years later, in 1998, he graduated from Aljamea-tus-Saifiyah with the degree of al-Faqih al-Jayyid (lit. 'The Distinguished Jurist' (Note: Equivalent to Masters in Arabic and Islamic Studies.)).

He frequented Cairo to study the art of recitation as well as the sciences of Quranic readings. He has released an audio recording of the entire Quran in the murattal style of recitation, certified by al-Azhar University, Cairo.

Burhanuddin has been delivering 30-minute mujawwad recitations of the Quran which precede the sermons delivered by his father Mufaddal Saifuddin, during Ashara Mubarāka, (Note: An annual 10-day mourning of Husayn ibn Ali's martrydom at the Battle of Karbala.) since 2012.

On 29 Dhu al-Hijja 1439H (9 September 2018), he received certification in the Ten recitations al-Sughra from the recitations of al-Shatebiya and al-Durra. On 25 July 2022, he published a book on the Ten recitations titled قراءات زاهرة لكتاب الله which was endorsed by the 'Muṣḥaf Revision Committee' of Al-Azhar University.

== Other accomplishments ==
He has been conferred both of the highest degrees of Aljamea-tus-Saifiyah; the degree of "Thiqah al-Da'wah al-Taiybiyyah" (Arabic: ثقة الدعوة الطيبية; translation: The Trusted of the Taiyebi Da'wah) and the degree of "al-'Aleem al-Baare' " (Arabic: العليم البارع; Translation: The Outstandingly Learned) on 3 May 2016 (27 Rajab 1437 Hijri).

He was appointed as the Chairman of the Saifee Burhani Upliftment Trust and as the Syedna's representative to meet Prime Minister Narendra Modi in Delhi and at Imam al-Hakim Mosque in Cairo.

On April 17, 2025, accompanied by a delegation of Dawoodi Bohra community members, Burhanuddin again met Prime Minister Narendra Modi at his official residence in New Delhi. The delegation expressed gratitude for the enactment of the Waqf Amendment Act. In his remarks, the Prime Minister praised Syedna Mufaddal Saifuddin for his active involvement in shaping the Act, including providing detailed input during its drafting. Community members also explained how the new legislation would ease their daily affairs, particularly in managing a recently acquired property in Mumbai’s Bhendi Bazaar.

== Lineage ==
Burhanuddin's ancestors include Mir Mahamad Ali, Fakhr al-Din Shaheed, Abd al-Qadir Hakimuddin, Khanji Pheer and Syedi Lukman who were direct descendants of Ja'far al-Sadiq.

== Works ==
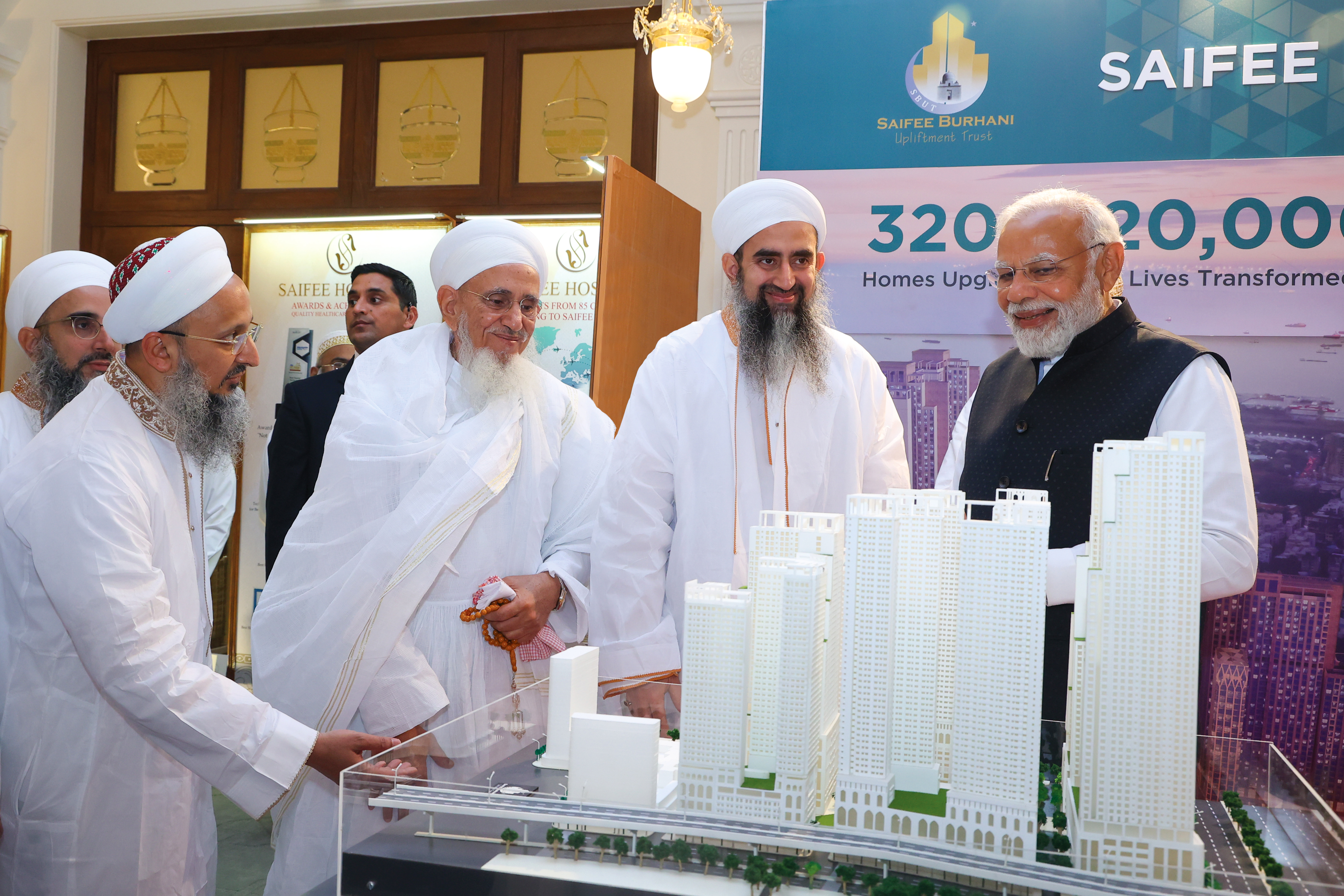
Shahzada Husain Burhanuddin serves as the chairman of SBUT, the first-of-its-kind cluster redevelopment project in India, located in Mumbai.

Burhanuddin has authored several audio and text books on Quran recitals, some are:

- Al-Taysīr fī Hifz al-Quran al-Karīm (Note: Published by Aljamea-tus-Saifiyah.) (Arabic: التيسير في حفظ القران الكريم, lit. 'Simplifying Memorization of the Holy Quran'): A practical guide for memorizing al-Quran al-Kareem.
- Al-Muṣḥaf al-Murattal (Note: Published by Janah al-Tarrannum bil Quran al-Kareem; certified by Al-Azhar University.) (Arabic: المصحف المرتل, lit. 'Murattal recitation of the Holy Quran'): Audio recording of the complete Quranic text in murattal (tartīl) style.
- Al-Muṣḥaf al-Muʿallim (Note: Published by Janah al-Tarrannum bil Quran al-Kareem.) (Arabic: المصحف المعلم, lit. 'Pedagogical recitation of the Holy Quran'): A digital aid for the memorization of the 30th Juzʾ of al-Quran.
- Al-Muṣḥaf al-Mujawwad (Note: Published by Janah al-Tarrannum bil Quran al-Kareem.) (Arabic: المصحف المجود, lit. 'Mujawwad recitation of the Holy Quran'): Audio recording of the 30th juzʾ of al-Quran in mujawwad (tajwīd) style.
- Qira'aat Zahira le Kitab Allah (Arabic: قراءات زاهرة لكتاب الله)

== Personal life ==
Burhanuddin has two elder brothers, Jafar us Sadiq Imaduddin and Taha Najmuddin and two sisters, Ummehani A. Nooruddin and Ruqaiyah M Saifuddin.

Husain's wife, Naqiyah, daughter of Mukasir al-Dawat Syedi Malik ul Ashter Shujauddin, is known for her elegance, poise and charm. She runs the Rawdat al-Quran al-Kareem school (Note: A school focused on Quranic studies based in Mumbai.) of Quranic sciences in Mumbai. She is the most followed woman from the Dawoodi Bohra community on Instagram, with an audience exceeding 130,000 followers. She completed her postgraduate education at D'Youville University, a nationally-ranked Catholic college located in upstate New York. An American citizen raised internationally in Houston, London and Mumbai, she has a deep understanding and expertise in online media presence - her personal website showcased her contemporary and refined approach, particularly on teaching and leadership.

== Recognition and awards ==
- India: On 15 May 2015 (27 Rajab 1436H) Mufaddal Saifuddin, the 53rd Dai al-Mutlaq, bestowed upon him the cognomen of Burhan al-din (Arabic: برهان الدين, lit. 'Proof of Faith').
- India: Burhanuddin was conferred one of the highest degrees of Aljamea-tus-Saifiyah; al-ʿAlīm al-Bāriʿ (Arabic: العليم البارع, lit. 'The Outstandingly Learned') on 3 May 2016 (27 Rajab 1437H).
- India: Burhanuddin was conferred one of the highest degrees of Dawat-e-Hadiyah; Thiqat al-Daʿwat al-Ṭayyibīyyah (Arabic: ثقة الدعوة الطيبية, lit. 'The trusted of the Taiyebi Da'wah') on 3 May 2016 (27 Rajab 1437H).
- India: Burhanuddin was a recipient of All India Council of Human Rights, Liberties, and Social Justice's Ambassador for Peace Award on 9 December 2019 "for protecting and promoting human rights, peace and harmony."
- Egypt: Honorary member of Naqabāt Qurrāʾ al-Quran (lit. 'Guild of Quran Reciters') in Cairo.
- United Arab Emirates : On behalf of Syedna Mufaddal Saifuddin, Shahzada Husain Burhanuddin attended the COP28 Global Faith leaders summit in Abu Dhabi and signed a joint appeal to take meaningful action in addressing climate crisis.
