= Mufaddal Saifuddin =

53rd Da'i al-Mutlaq of the Dawoodi Bohra

Syedna Mufaddal Saifuddin 53rd Dā'ī al-Mutlaq of the Dawoodi Bohra
- مُفضّل سيفُ ٱلدّين
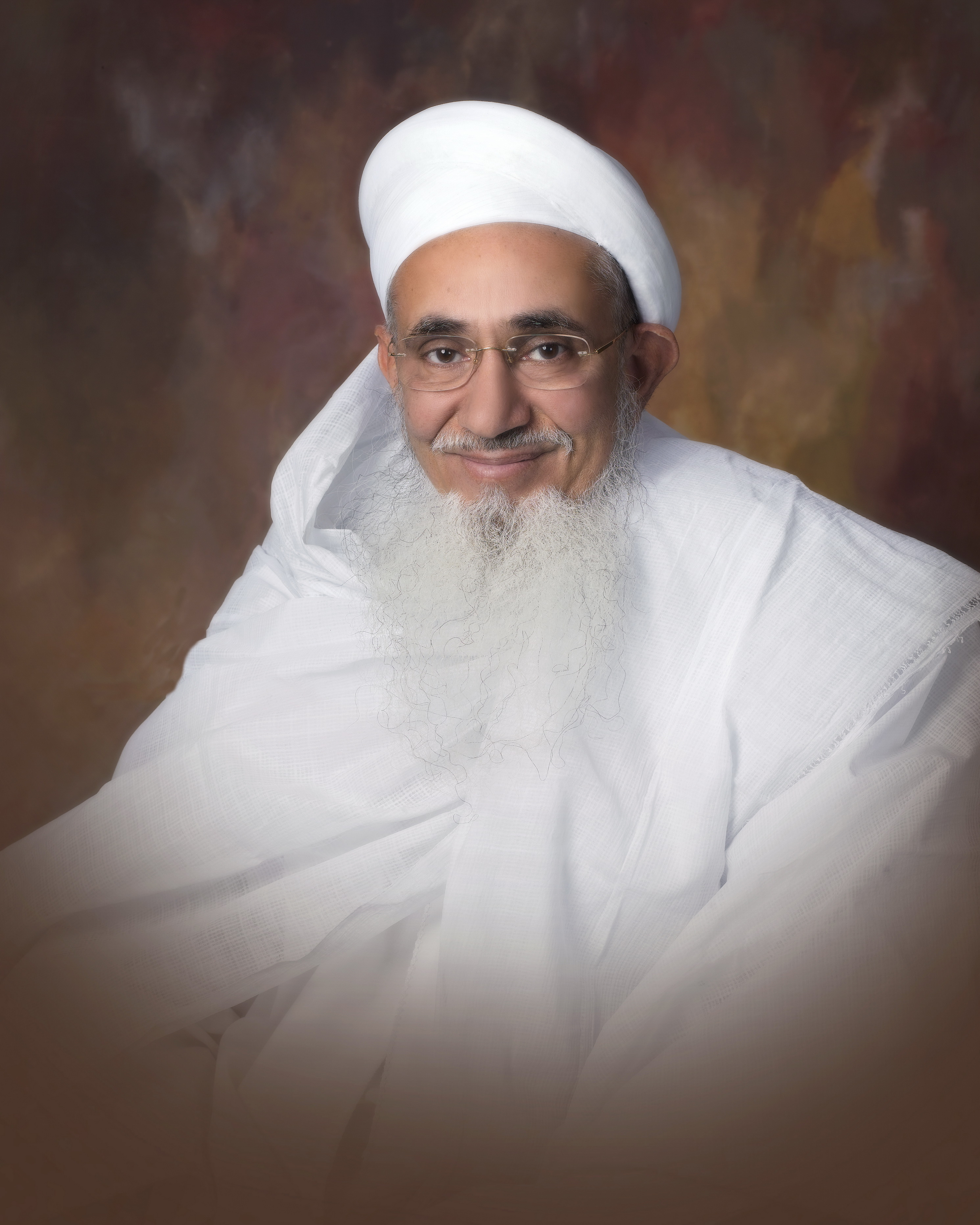

Da'i al-Mutlaq
- Preceded by: Mohammed Burhanuddin
- Title: Syedna; Da'i al-Fatemi; Da'i al-Mutlaq; Aqeeq al-Yemen

Personal life
- Born: Aali Qadr Mufaddal; 20 August 1946 (age 80) Surat, Bombay Presidency, British India
- Spouse: Jawharatusharaf (née Najmuddin) (m. 1970)
- Children: Jafar us Sadiq Imaduddin; Taha Najmuddin; Husain Burhanuddin; Ummehani A Nooruddin; Ruqaiyyah Saifuddin
- Parents: Mohammed Burhanuddin (father); Aaisaheba Amatullah (mother)
- Education: Al Jamea tus Saifiyah; Mumbai University; Al-Azhar University; Cairo University
- Honours: Order of the Nile; Chief of the Order of the Golden Heart of Kenya; Nishan-e-Pakistan

Mufaddal Saifuddin (Arabic: مُفضّل سيفُ ٱلدّين; born 20 August 1946) is the 53rd al-Dai al-Mutlaq and leader of the Dawoodi Bohra community, a Tayyibi, Musta'li, Ismaili, Shia Muslim denomination. He succeeded his father, Syedna Mohammed Burhanuddin, upon the latter’s death in January 2014.

Born in Surat, India, Saifuddin was educated at Aljamea-tus-Saifiyah and pursued further studies in Cairo. During his father’s tenure, he held senior educational and administrative roles within the community. As leader, he has conceived community welfare initiatives such as Faiz al-Mawaid al-Burhaniyah and Project Rise, as well as restoration projects of Fatimid-era monuments in Egypt and the Saifee Burhani Upliftment Project, an urban redevelopment project in Mumbai's Bhendi Bazaar.

Saifuddin serves as Chancellor of Aligarh Muslim University and Jamia Millia Islamia, and has received state honours including Kenya’s Chief of the Order of the Golden Heart, Egypt’s Grand Cordon of the Order of the Nile, and Pakistan’s Nishan-e-Pakistan.

The Bohra community traces their history to the Fatimid Imams, who are direct descendants of the Prophet Mohammed through his daughter Fatima al-Zahra. After the 21st Imam went into spiritual seclusion, the office of al-Dai al-Mutlaq was established and Mufaddal Saifuddin is the current D’ai al-Mutlaq.

== Early life ==
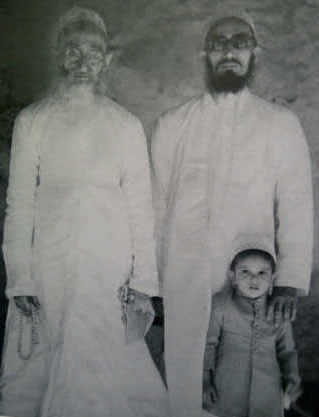
A young Aali Qadr Mufaddal Saifuddin (bottom right) with his father, Mohammed Burhanuddin (right), and grand father, Taher Saifuddin (left) c. 1950.

Syedna Mufaddal Saifuddin was born on 20 August 1946 (23 Ramadan 1365 AH) in Surat, India, He is the filius secundus (Latin for "second son") of the 52nd Dai al-Mutlaq, Syedna Mohammed Burhanuddin, who was himself the son of the 51st al-Dai al-Mutlaq, Syedna Taher Saifuddin. He was named Aliqader Mufaddal by his grandfather, to correspond with the Abjad value of his birth year 1365 AH.

From an early age, Saifuddin received personal spiritual and scholarly tutelage from both his grandfather and father, familiarising him with the values, customs, and traditions associated with the office of the al-Dai al-Mutlaq. His early education, following Fatimi tradition, emphasised Quranic principles, forming the foundation of his later scholarly and community engagements. He completed his primary and secondary education in Mumbai and subsequently enrolled at Aljamea-tus-Saifiyah in Surat, the community’s Arabic academy.

On 27 January 1969, Syedna Mohammed Burhanuddin privately designated Saifuddin as his successor at the age of 22 through nass (a formal spiritual designation). This spiritual designation was reaffirmed in 1994, 2005, and twice again publicly in 2011. Nass was performed on him five times.

He graduated in 1969 with the degree of al-Faqih al-Jayyid (Distinguished Jurist), considered equivalent to a master's in Islamic jurisprudence. In 1971, he was awarded the degree of al-Aleem al-Baari (Outstanding Scholar), a title conferred upon only the most decorated and accomplished graduates.

Between 1972 and 1978, Saifuddin pursued advanced Islamic studies in Cairo, engaging with scholars from Al-Azhar University, Cairo University, and other prominent academic institutions. His time in Cairo strengthened his expertise in Arabic language, literature, and Fatemid intellectual traditions, while broadening his exposure to Islamic scholarship and interfaith dialogue. During this period, he became known as al-Amir Mufaddal and represented his father in various academic and interfaith circles.

In addition to his studies in Cairo, Saifuddin also holds academic credentials from the University of Mumbai. He is fluent in 6 languages: Lisan ud-Dawat, Arabic, English, Gujarati, Hindi, and Urdu. His practical experience was shaped by accompanying his father throughout most of his travels, witnessing firsthand the management of the community's religious, social, and civic affairs.

== Leadership ==
Saifuddin frequently travels to both major cities and remote towns, meeting individuals and families to offer guidance and oversee the implementation of religious, educational, welfare initiatives and facilitate philanthropic giving by the community. These journeys often include discussions with government leaders, diplomats and civic officials on broader social and humanitarian matters, as well as wider citizens.

Sermons delivered during his visits serve as a principal platform for conveying Fatemid Islamic teachings. These addresses integrate traditional doctrine with contemporary relevance, especially engaging younger members of the community. The annual Ashara Mubaraka gathering, commemorating the martyrdom of Imam Husain, remains a significant event in this regard. All Dawoodi Bohras are required to refrain from employment and schooling to participate in religious observance throughout the nine-day period.

Saifuddin has introduced a range of initiatives aimed at strengthening social welfare. Among these are annual service week, launched in 2015, dedicated to "fostership" and "upliftment," encouraging resource-sharing and increasing access to housing, education, and financial security. He has proscribed mobile phone use among children, cautioning against speculative financial practices (such as share investment and mutual funds), and promoted interest-free economic models intended to support financial stability and ethical responsibility.

== Aljamea-tus-Saifiyah ==
In 1987, Saifuddin was appointed as one of the four rectors of Aljamea-tus-Saifiyah, the Dawoodi Bohra community’s principal academic institution. Although the youngest of the four, he was designated as the final authority among them. He has maintained a close relationship with Aljamea-tus-Saifiyah’s faculty and students, supervising curriculum development, oral examinations, and institutional planning. Aljamea-tus-Saifiyah currently serves approximately 3,000 students across four campuses under his leadership and emphasises both religious scholarship and preparation for leadership roles in Dawoodi Bohra clergy.

In 2017, Saifuddin conceived and led the expansion of Aljamea-tus-Saifiyah further, a new campus was inaugurated in Nairobi, Kenya, at a ceremony attended by then-President Uhuru Kenyatta. In Mumbai, Saifuddin supervised the development of a new 850,000-sq-ft campus in Marol, which includes academic, residential, and administrative facilities. The campus was inaugurated in February 2023 in the presence of Prime Minister Narendra Modi. Coverage in newspapers such as The Hindu, Indian Express, and Times of India noted Syedna Saifuddin’s presence at the ceremony in his capacity as the community’s spiritual head and a leader associated with the institution.

Saifuddin has expanded the role of Mahad al-Zahra, an institute under Aljamea-tus-Saifiyah established in 1976 and dedicated to the Quranic sciences. Under his leadership, advanced digital tools such as apps, recorded recitations, and virtual classes have been introduced, allowing learners from diverse backgrounds to engage with the Quran. Through these initiatives, Saifuddin has brought about a steady rise in the number of individuals young and old, who have memorized the Quran.

== Teachings ==
Syedna Mufaddal Saifuddin’s teachings integrate classical scholarship with contemporary relevance, emphasising spiritual reflection, ethical responsibility, and service to the community. His sermons, delivered throughout his travels and especially during the annual Ashara Mubaraka congregation, serve as the primary medium for imparting these teachings. Drawing from the Quran, Fatemid philosophy, Islamic history, and the sacrifice of Karbala, his sermons uniquely contextualise principles of sacrifice, justice, and faith with contemporary challenges faced by the community.

In addition to his sermons, Saifuddin has authored numerous theological treatises in Arabic and Lisan al-Dawat, as well as poetic compositions in Arabic, Lisan al-Dawat, and Urdu, and he has completed and published works initiated (but which could not be completed) by his predecessors, Syedna Taher Saifuddin and Syedna Mohammed Burhanuddin.

=== The Pursuit of Knowledge ===
In February 2023, Syedna Mufaddal Saifuddin presided over the inauguration of the newly developed campus of Al Jamea-tus-Saifiyah in Mumbai, attended by India’s Prime Minister. These reports also placed the redevelopment within the broader context of community education and the institute’s role as a theological and academic centre.

Saifuddin supervises MSB Educational Institute schools in 30 cities, as well as a broader network of 70 schools and 600 religious instruction centers. He has also established an annual education program, Istifadah Ilmiyah. This is a series of annual learning and skill-development seminars held in Surat that cover topics such as Islamic philosophy, history, and contemporary issues, drawing participants from across the Dawoodi Bohra community. In 2023, Saifuddin inaugurated the School of Law building at Karachi University with the aim to promote holistic development through education.

=== Business ===
Saifuddin has emphasized ethical and socially responsible business practices grounded in Islamic principles. He has promoted lawful and interest-free economic activity and cautioned against speculative instruments such as share investment.

Under his guidance, the Qardhan Hasana program, offering interest-free loans for education, business, and personal needs, has expanded through a global network of community chapters. The community has also established the Burhani Business School at Aljamea-tus-Saifiyah, for research in Islamic commercial ethics, and supports entrepreneurs through business advisory services, incubators and trade expos.

=== Status of Women ===
Syedna Mufaddal Saifuddin has advocated for women’s access to education, vocational training, and family welfare within a values-based framework.

In 2020, he established Daerat al-Aqeeq, a department focused on the well-being of women and children in Dawoodi Bohra communities. The department coordinates initiatives related to health, education, and social welfare, including maternal health awareness and skill development programs.

Female participation in education has increased during his tenure. At Aljamea-tus-Saifiyah, women form a part of the student body, and community-run schools report higher female enrollment rates in some regions. Graduates have pursued careers in medicine, education and research.

=== Healthy Living ===
Syedna Mufaddal Saifuddin has issued guidance on health and lifestyle, including dietary habits, exercise, and daily routines. He has encouraged the establishment of recreational centers and the inclusion of walking and physical activity in daily life.

He has addressed the impact of digital consumption and has supported initiatives on hygiene, structured routines, and interpersonal interaction. In 2025, a community campaign was launched to proscribe screen time for children under 15 through seminars and counseling.

He has also initiated educational campaigns on the risks of alcohol, tobacco, and vaping. Community programs provide mobility support, companionship, healthcare access, and recreational activities for senior members.

== Construction Projects ==
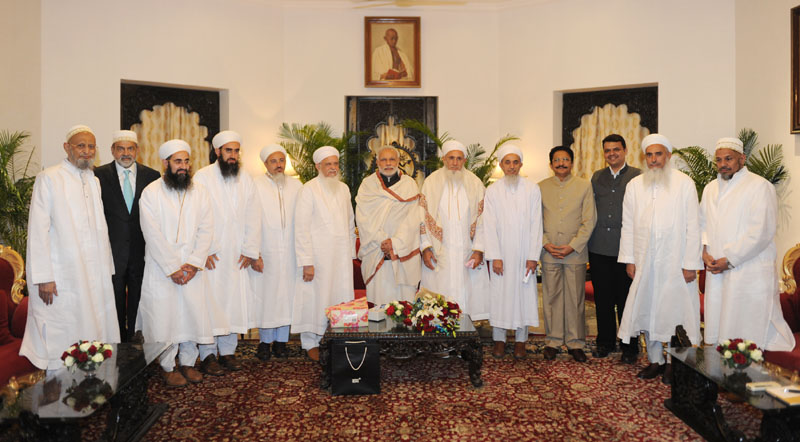
From third left (to right): Taha Najmuddin, Husain Burhanuddin, Ammar Jamaluddin, Qaidjoher Ezzuddin, Narendra Modi, Mufaddal Saifuddin, Idris Badruddin, Vidyasagar Rao, Devendra Fadnavis, Qusai Vajihuddin, Abdeali Bhanpurawala in Mumbai on 2 January 2015.

=== Egypt ===
Syedna Saifuddin is responsible for the restoration of medieval Fatimid mosques in Egypt. Projects include the restoration and revival of Al-Hakim Mosque (al-Jamea al-Anwar), the restoration of the masjid of Zoeb bin Moosa in 1406H, the restoration of Aqmar Mosque in 1408H, construction of the mosque of Abdullah ibn Muhammad ibn Ismail in Salamiyah in 1414H, restoration of the Lulua Mosque and Juyushi Mosque in 1416H, construction of the zareeh of Zaynab bint Ali in Cairo in 1416H,

=== Palestinian Occupied Territories / State of Israel ===
Syedna Saifuddin is responsible for the restoration of the Mashhad Ras al-Husayn in Ashkelon in 1421H.

=== Yemen ===
Syedna Saifuddin is responsible for the restoration of the Mazar and Mosque of Hatim bin Ibrahim in 1425H, and the identification and ratification of the tombs of eight Da'i al-Mutlaq in Yemen.

=== Aljamea tus Saifiyah Campuses ===
Under his guidance two new campuses of Aljamea tus Saifiyah have been completed. The Nairobi, Kenya campus was inaugurated by Syedna Saifuddin and the President of Kenya, Uhuru Kenyatta on 20 April 2017. The Prime Minister of India, Narendra Modi inaugurated the fourth campus in Marol, Mumbai on 10 February 2023. A fifth campus located in Sidhpur, announced in March 2026, is currently in development.

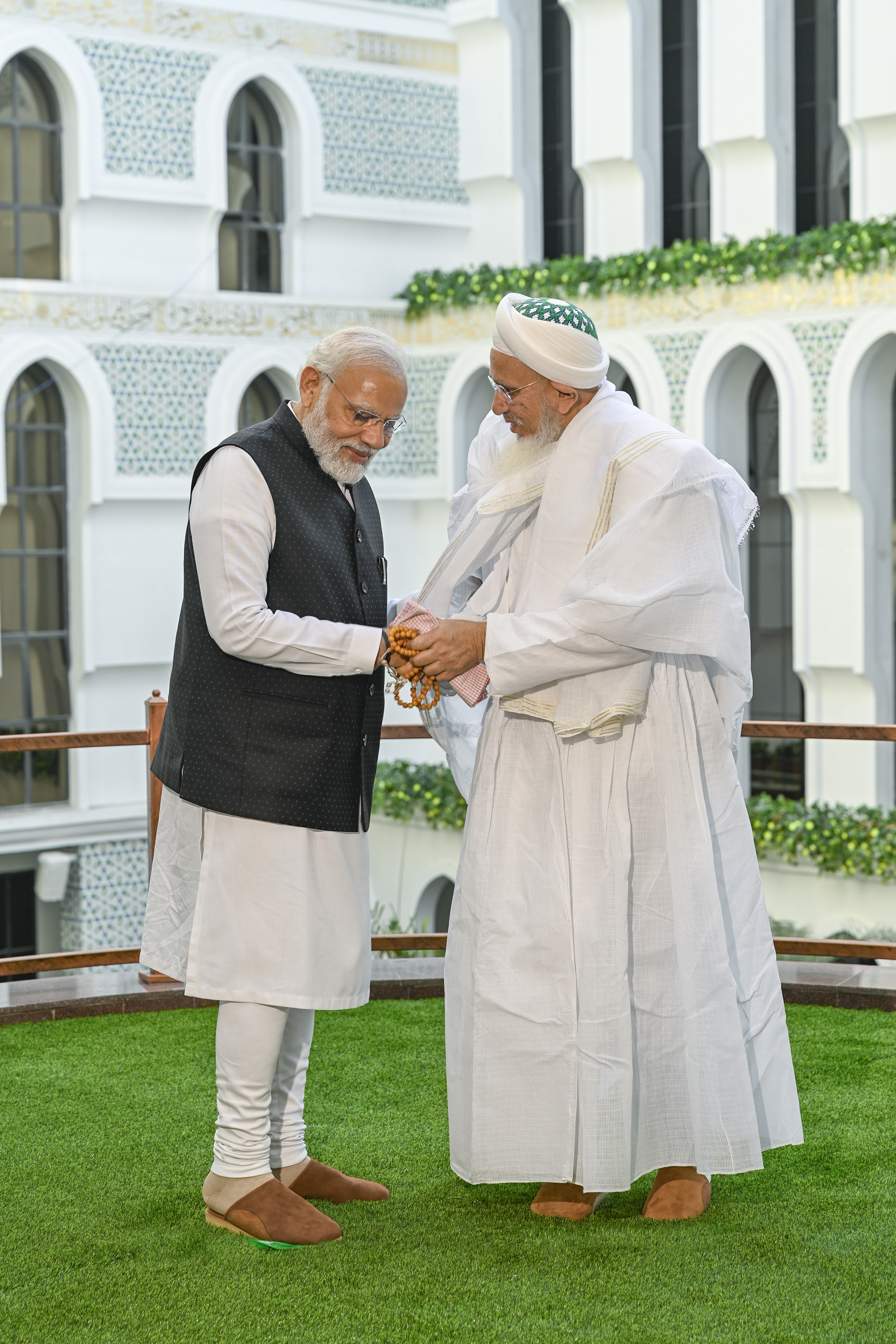
Syedna Mufaddal Saifuddin with Prime Minister Narendra Modi at the inauguration of the Aljamea-tus-Saifiyah campus in Marol, Mumbai.

=== Saifee Burhani Upliftment Trust ===
Syedna Saifuddin has led the Bhendi Bazaar Redevelopment Project, including the public charitable trust named the Saifee Burhani Upliftment Trust was created on 23 January 2009 with an initial corpus provided by settlors Shahzada Qaidjoher Ezzuddin and Shahzada Abbas Fakhruddin. The first phase was completed and inaugurated by Syedna Saifuddin on 18 May, 2016. About 250 dilapidated buildings in Bhendi Bazaar will be replaced with 17 new mega-towers with modern roads, infrastructure, efficiently opitimised residential spaces and densely networked commercial areas. The philanthropic enterprise "aims to rehabilitate 3200 families and 1250 businesses which are currently living in poor conditions." It is expected to be completed by 2030.

On 17 April 2025, Prime Minister Narendra Modi received a delegation of Dawoodi Bohra community members at his official residence in New Delhi, led by Husain Burhanuddin. During the meeting, the delegation expressed appreciation for the enactment of the Waqf Amendment Act. In his address, the Prime Minister commended Syedna Mufaddal Saifuddin for his significant contribution to the development of the legislation, noting his involvement at every stage, including in the drafting process "down to commas and full stops." Community representatives shared how the amended Act would facilitate the management of Waqf properties, including a recently acquired sites by the SBUT in Mumbai's Bhendi Bazaar.

== Office of al-Dai al-Mutlaq ==
Syedna Saifuddin is the incumbent 53rd Da'i al-Mutlaq of the Tayyibi Isma'ili Dawoodi Bohra community, appointed by his predecessor and father, Mohammed Burhanuddin II. He stands out among Dawoodi Bohra Dais for appointing such a large number of deputies during his term.

Within his first decade as Dai, he has honoured nearly all of his surviving paternal uncles and brothers by appointing each to serve as a deputy. Upon each deputy’s completion of their earthly journey, he named another successor from his close circle - reflecting his inclusive leadership and commitment to strengthening communal bonds.

=== Deputies ===
On 18 Dhu al-Hijjah 1435 (12 October 2014 AD), Saifuddin elevated his uncle Husain Husamuddin to the rank of Mazoon al-Dawat and appointed his uncle Qasim Hakimuddin as Mukasir al-Dawat at a religious gathering held in Mumbai.

On 20 Rabi' al-Thani 1439H (7 January 2018 AD), Saifuddin elevated Qasim Hakimuddin to the rank of Mazoon and appointed his uncle Ali Asgar Kalimuddin as Mukasir at a religious gathering in Surat.

On 27 Jumada al-Thani 1440H (4 March 2019 AD), Saifuddin elevated Aliasgar Kalimuddin to the rank of Mazoon and appointed his elder brother Qaidjoher Ezzuddin as Mukasir at a religious gathering in Ahmedabad.

On 18 Dhu al-Hijjah 1445H (24 June 2024 AD), Saifuddin elevated his elder brother Qaidjoher Ezzuddin to the rank of Mazoon al-Dawat and appointed his younger brother Malik-ul Ashtar Shujauddin as Mukasir al-Dawat at a religious gathering held in Saifee Masjid, Mumbai. Both brothers are Distinguished Rectors of Aljamea-tus-Saifiyah.

== Philanthropy ==
=== Faiz al-Mawaid al-Burhaniyah ===
To ensure that not a single community member ever goes hungry, Saifuddin has expanded the worldwide community kitchen scheme, named Faiz al-Mawaid al-Burhaniyah (Arabic:فيض الموائد البرهانية). Every day, a Tiffin or Thali consisting of a fully prepared and cooked meal is delivered to each and every Dawoodi Bohra community household worldwide.

To reduce food wastage, Syedna Saifuddin implemented a policy to strictly limit the number of dishes served in any community, social or personal gathering where Dawoodi Bohras are present. Approximately 7,000 Dana Committee (literally "grain committee") volunteers world-wide are tasked with enforcing this directive to eliminate food wastage at all community events.

=== Social Upliftment ===
In December 2016, Syedna Saifuddin initiated a social Upliftment Program, to improve the living conditions of the community. The 5-day upliftment drive provided free services to community members: renovation of houses, planting of trees and shrubs, upgrading to squat toilets, building playground and sports facilities, dental hygiene, vaccination camps, a sports day and a community breakfast.

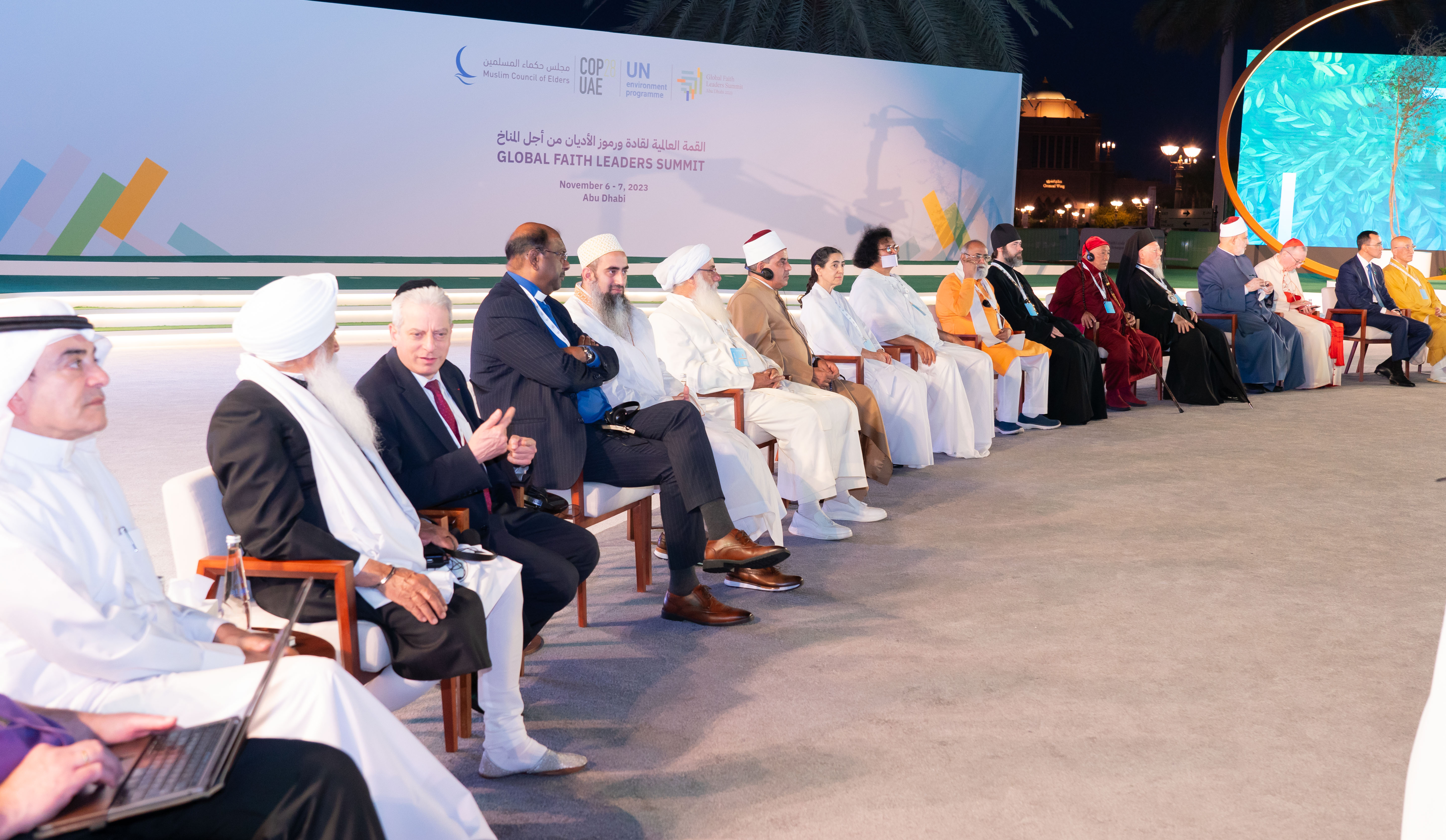
Shehzada Husain Burhanuddin, representing Syedna Mufaddal Saifuddin, at the COP28 Global Faith Leaders Summit in Abu Dhabi.

He has also launched a global initiative named Project Rise to help improve the lives of people that are marginalized, neglected or living in poverty. In partnership with government bodies and local organizations around the world, Project Rise's upliftment programs span a range of policy areas, including healthcare, nutrition, sanitation and hygiene, environmental responsibility and conservation, and education. These initiatives provide humanitarian aid during natural disasters and pandemics.

=== Saifee Burhani Medical Association ===
By the grace of God, may doctors prosper in service [of humanity]. May God grant his believers and worshipers cure at their hands. May their numbers continue to flourish.

— Mufaddal Saifuddin, Jumada 1436ھـ, Orange County.

Syedna Saifuddin, on a visit to North America, established Saifee Burhani Medical Association (America), on 14 March 2015, chaired by his brothers, Qaidjoher Ezzuddin, Qusai Vajihuddin, Ammar Jamaluddin, and his son, Husain Burhanuddin. The charter of the association is to run free medical clinics, mentor students, facilitate professional development and support doctors in developing practice models that eliminate insurance billing while maintaining high-quality patient care.

=== Donations ===
Syedna Saifuddin espouses that charity comes not from public celebration but from the sincere desire to create positive change in the world, inspiring others through actions rather than words. He advocates a modest lifestyle, wearing simple white clothes and personally embodies the wisdom that "the left hand should not know that the right hand is giving". Commanding the substantial charitable resources of the entire Dawoodi Bohra community (conservatively estimated as an inflow of USD 230 million per year), his approach to philanthropy reflects a deep commitment to helping others without seeking any recognition or acclaim, even community members are unaware of where his philanthropy is directed, highlighting the humility and discretion behind his generous efforts.

In 2014, Saifuddin met Abdel Fattah el-Sisi and donated E£10 million to the Long Live Egypt Fund (Tahya Misr).

In October 2016, Syedna Saifuddin donated US$53,000 to Tanzanian public schools. The same month, a local community led by Saifuddin donated TSh 545 million toward earthquake relief efforts in Tanzania.

On 27 April 2017, Saifuddin donated KSh 5,200,000/= for Beyond Zero initiative towards maternal and child health to Margaret Kenyatta, First Lady of Kenya.

On 19 July 2018, Saifuddin met Abdel Fattah el-Sisi and expressed interest in investing in Egypt. Saifuddin also donated E£10 million (US$621,553) to the Long Live Egypt Fund (Tahya Misr), matching his own donation from 2014.

In September 2019, Saifuddin met with President Maithripala Sirisena of Sri Lanka and donated Rs 10 million/- (US$53,553) to National Kidney Fund of Sri Lanka to enhance facilities and improve welfare and preventive care for patients impacted by chronic kidney disease. In the same month, Syedna Saifuddin made a "significant contribution" to the Relief Fund of Chief Minister of Maharashtra to aid with rehabilitation efforts post 2019 Indian floods. In October 2019 Syedna Saifuddin donated Rs.5 million/- to National Cancer Institute, Maharagama towards infrastructure and capacity expansion of its Bone Marrow Transplant Unit.

In October 2019, Syedna Saifuddin donated 60,000 seed balls to Kenya, and a month later, on the occasion of his 76th birthday per the Islamic calendar, he donated 76,000 more which were utilized to grow over 35,000 indigenous tree species at Amboseli National Park.

In May 2021, Syedna Saifuddin donated INR ₹1 crore/- towards the purchase of medical equipment for the Jawaharlal Nehru Medical College Hospital at Aligarh Muslim University during the second wave of the COVID-19 pandemic.

In March 2025, on behalf of Syedna Saifuddin, His Excellency Kinana Jamaluddin (the Head of the Dawoodi Bohra community in Dubai) donated AED 1 million (USD 272,054) to the Father's Endowment campaign which honors fathers through an endowment fund to provide healthcare for the poor and needy.

== Community Policies & Guidance ==
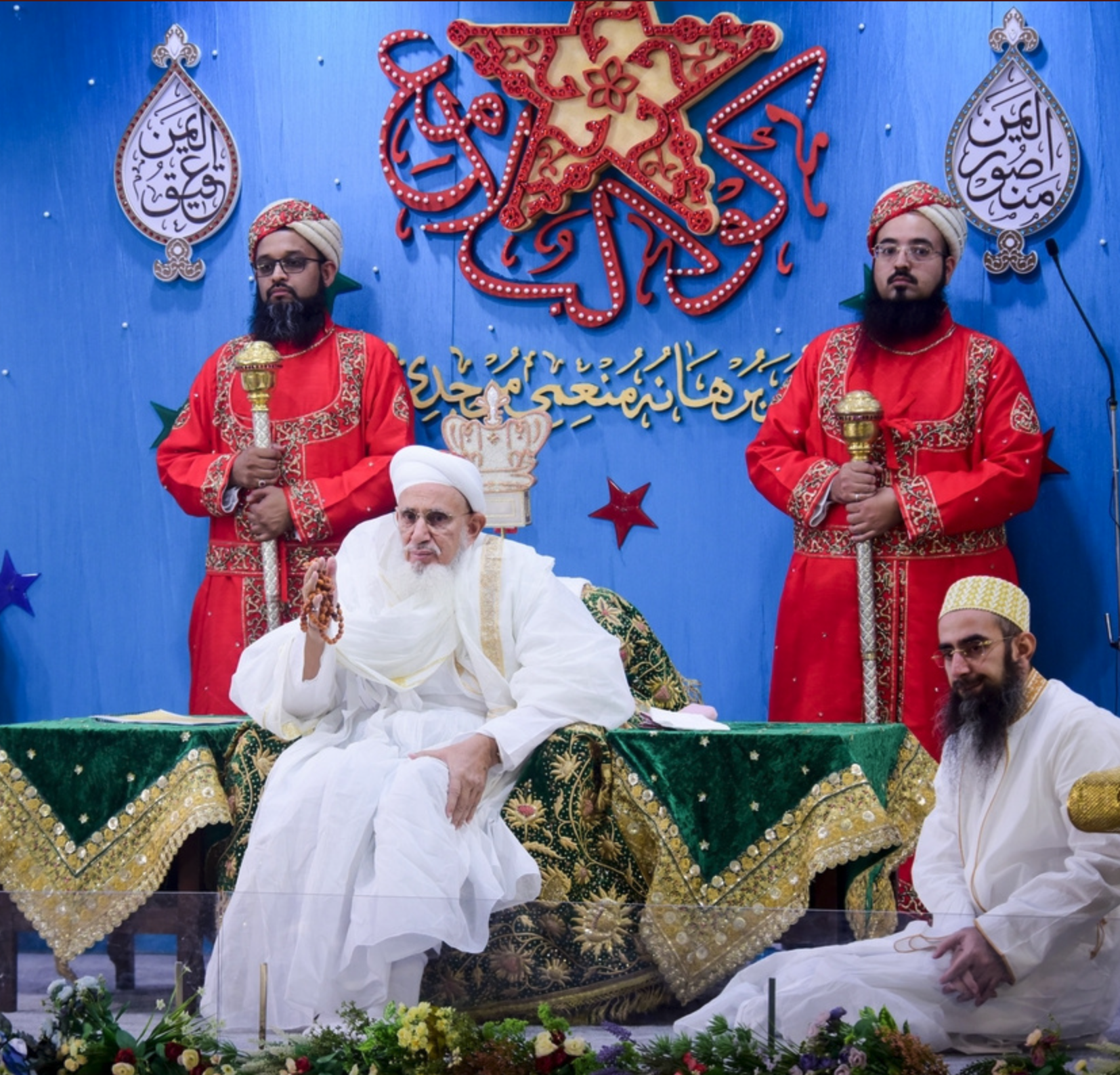
Saifuddin at his 75th birthday celebrations in Surat; seated besides him is his son, Burhanuddin (2018).

=== Islamic Finance ===
Syedna Saifuddin has been a strong advocate for Islamic finance principles, particularly the practice of Qardan Hasana (interest-free loans). Saifuddin has actively promoted and expanded the Burhani Qardan Hasana Trust, which freely offers generous interest-free loans to community members. Under his leadership, the Qardan Hasana system has continued to play a crucial role in the economic development of the Dawoodi Bohra community.

Syedna Saifuddin has forbidden community members from bank saving, time deposits or borrowing, EMI finance schemes, overdrafts, contributing to or accepting money from insurance schemes, investments in commodities and stock markets, cryptocurrency, pension, mutual or retirement fund investments or use of credit cards: deeming them haram (forbidden) in Islam. Instead, he encourages strict adherence to traditional Islamic financial principles, urging followers to rely on community-based support systems rather than conventional financial instruments which are speculative in nature (gharar, maisir) or interest-based (riba). This approach has led to the development of numerous financial structures within the community, giving community members financial flexibility and integration with modern economic systems.

=== Embargo on Mobile Phones for Children ===
On 19 December 2024, Syedna Saifuddin unveiled a directive to minimise the use of mobile phones by people under the age of 15, following global concerns about the negative effects of mobile phone usage on children's health. The directive has been supported by the Dawoodi Bohra community, with parents and teachers feeling that an official directive legitimises their desire to encourage their children to pursue healthier activities, such as sports and art.

=== Female Circumcision ===
In Hansard-UK parliament it was reported that Syedna Saifuddin supports the practice of female circumcision, which the Dawoodi Bohra community refers to as khatna or khafz. In a sermon delivered in Mumbai in April 2016, Syedna Saifuddin stated that whatever necessary "must be done" for both men and women, which was widely reported to be referring to FGM. The Dawoodi Bohra Women's Association for Religious Freedom (DBWRF), a Bohra community institution, advocates genital cutting arguing that female circumcision (khatna / khafz) is a minor religious procedure involving only a small nick or excision on the clitoral hood or prepuce. The DBWRF position is that khafz is a centuries-old religious freedom and rite of passage for religious purity, comparable to male circumcision, and is not intended to control female sexuality. However, this position is contested by some members of the Bohra community and activists who oppose the practice. Syedna's Saifuddin's administration has actively supported community members in their legal battles to exercise their religious freedoms, his UK-registered charity spent more than £800,000 on “costs incurred in defending four members of the Dawoodi Bohra congregation in Sydney in connection with female circumcision”. The community has successfully defended an indictment brought against the practice by the U.S. Department of Justice Criminal Division and the Federal Bureau of Investigation by arguing that the US federal statute was unconstitutional.Regarding this landmark judgement, Constitutional law scholar Alan Dershowitz, a professor emeritus of Harvard University and prominent Birmingham defense attorney Mayer Morganroth was hired by Dawat-e-Hadiyah "to protect the people charged and represent the religious organization" as per Morganroth.

== Travels ==
Syedna Saifuddin travels often, going to Dawoodi Bohra community centers year-round to meet his followers, deliver sermons, organise local communities, launch social projects, curate communal generosity and commemorate important religious functions.

Most of his events are hosted in Surat, home to the original Aljamea-tus-Saifiyah campus, and Mumbai, home to Raudat Tahera. Saifuddin also visits Karachi frequently owing to a large presence of followers.

Syedna Saifuddin visits regularly visits congregations in Yemen, Egypt, and Iraq for their religious and historical importance. Saifuddin also often travels to various places of pilgrimage within India like Taherabad in Rajasthan; Ahmedabad, Jamnagar, Mandvi, and Delmal in Gujarat; Burhanpur and Ujjain in Madhya Pradesh; especially to commemorate annual remembrance of the Duaat and Hudood Kiram buried there.

On 27 April 2022, Syedna Saifuddin, with President of Egypt Abdel Fattah El Sisi, inaugurated Imam Al-Hussein Mosque in Cairo after renovation works to the mosque and the area surrounding it, including the new lounge of the holy shrine of Imam Al-Hussein.

In July 2024, His Excellency Kamran Tessori, the Governor of Sindh, Pakistan sought the counsel of Syedna Saifuddin regarding the nation’s pressing debt challenges. Acknowledging the situation, Syedna Saifuddin said he stood together with Pakistan and gave his blessings for Pakistan's speedy economic recovery. Syedna Saifuddin also committed that the Dawoodi Bohra community would provide global Karzan Hasanah funds to the government of Pakistan on an interest-free basis, aiming to alleviate the debt burden and restore strength to the economy.

== Recognition ==
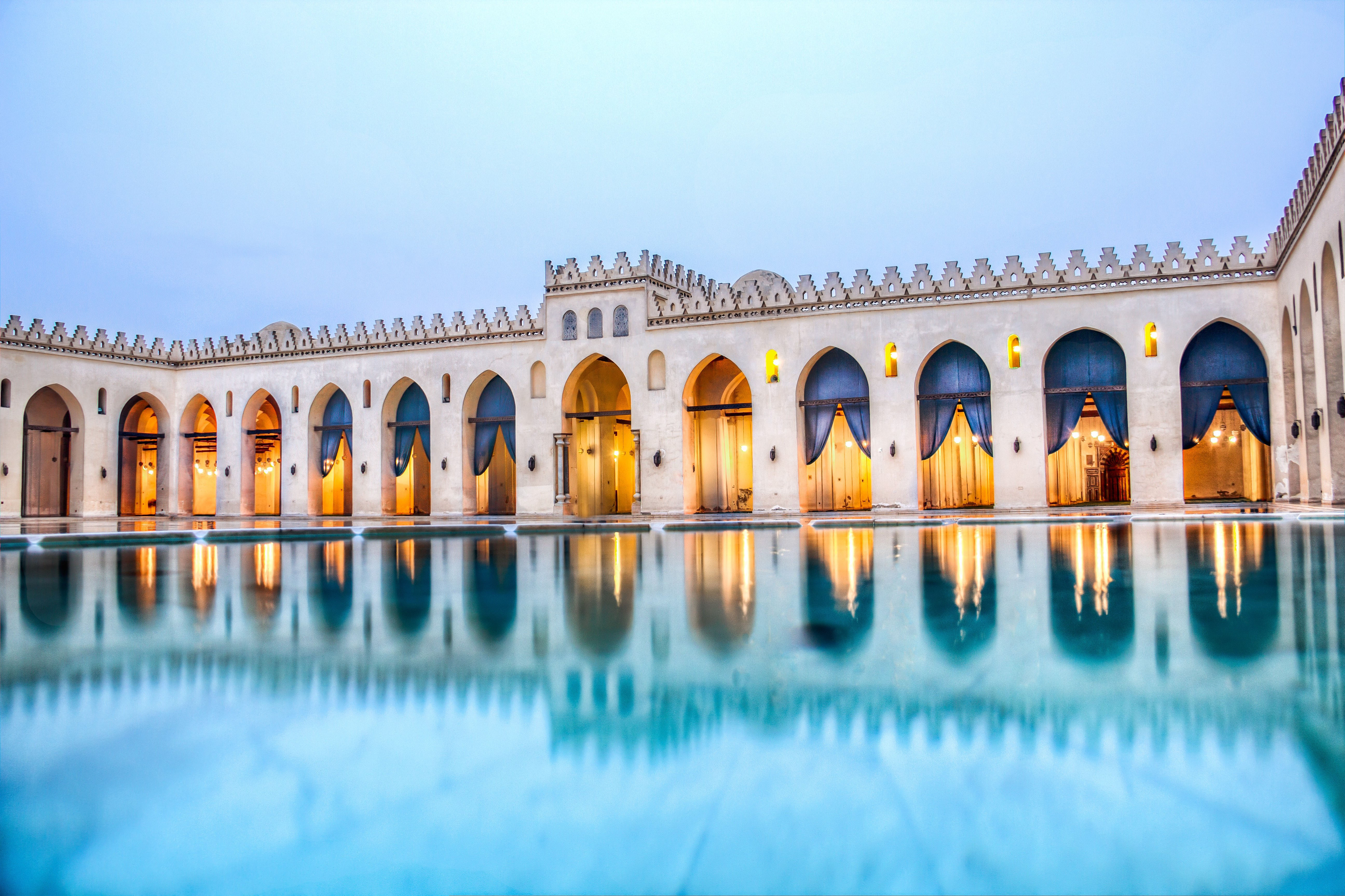
Al Hakim Mosque's renovations in 1970s were led by Saifuddin.

=== Community ===
Mufaddal Saifuddin's path of recognition began early in his youth. During his early studies in Cairo, he achieved the distinguished status of Haafiz al-Quran (حافظ القران) by memorizing the entire Quran, earning him recognition in Egypt as the Shaykh al-Ma'arif (Master of Knowledge).

When he was 13½ years old, his grandfather Taher Saifuddin took his Misaq on May 22, 1960 (27th of Zil al-Qa'da 1379H), during his 75th birthday celebrations. In his misaaq vows, he pledged his life to the service of the Dawat-E-Hadiyah (Lit: the rightly guided mission).

On 18 March 1966 (27th of Zil al-Qa'da 1385H), Mohammed Burhanuddin bestowed upon him two significant honors: the title of Thiqat al-D'awat al-Tayyibiyah (The Trusted of the Tayyibi Mission) and the cognomen "Saifuddin" (Scimitar of Islam).

In January 1969, he was crowned as successor-designate by nass (divine appointment) by his father Mohammed Burhanuddin. In 1971 he was appointed Amirul Hajj by his father Burhanuddin. Following his completion of Hajj, he embarked on a significant journey to Yemen, after which his father honored him with the illustrious distinction Aqeeq al-Yemen (The Agate of Yemen).

His academic achievements were again recognized in June 1971 when he received one of Al Jamea tus Saifiyah's most prestigious degrees, al-'Aleem al-Baare' (The Outstandingly Learned). His connection to this institution deepened when he was appointed its Rector (Ameer al Jamea) in April 1987.

Syedna Saifuddin's influence in academic leadership continued to grow when he was elected Chancellor of Aligarh Muslim University in April 2015, a position to which he was re-elected in December 2018. His academic leadership expanded further when he was unanimously elected Chancellor of Jamia Millia Islamia University in March 2023 for a five-year term.

His contributions have been recognized internationally through numerous honors and awards. The University of Karachi awarded him an honorary doctorate in September 2015. From 2014 to 2025, he has consistently been named among The 500 Most Influential Muslims. He received the Grand Cordon of the National Order of Madagascar in June 2014, and various other honors including the Key to Moshi (Tanzania) in 2015, Elder of the Order of the Golden Heart from Kenya in 2017, and the Key to Karachi in September 2017.

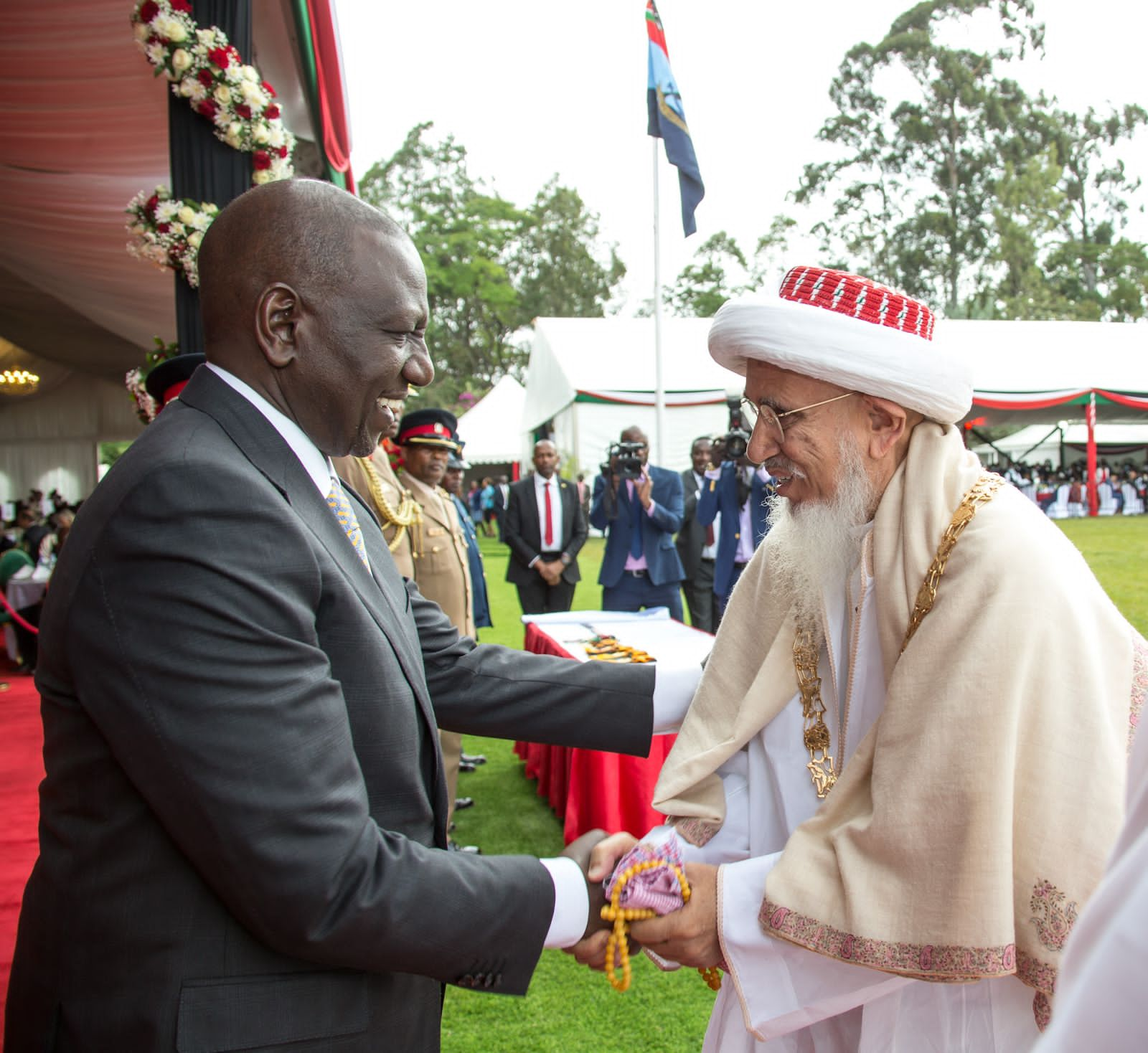
Syedna Mufaddal Saifuddin receiving the Chief of the Order of the Golden Heart, the highest civilian honour of Kenya, from President William Ruto.

In a unique recognition given only to Heads of State, a new species of orchid was named "Dendrobium HH Dr. Syedna Mufaddal Saifuddin" in Singapore in April 2018. His more recent honors include the Chief of the Order of the Golden Heart from Kenya's President William Ruto in December 2022, Egypt's Grand Condom of the Order of the Nile in August 2023, and Pakistan's Nishan e Pakistan in December 2023 for his social services contributions.

In recognition of his environmental leadership, his special representative, His Excellency Kinana Bhaisaheb Jamaluddin, represented him at the Global Faith Leaders COP29 Summit in Baku, where he made an appeal on behalf of Syedna for global leaders to take meaningful action in addressing the climate crisis. On hearing his heartfelt and eloquent call to action, many leaders commented that the uniquely Islamic perspective was both refreshing and deeply resonant.

=== Awards ===
Year & Date	Country	Award/Honour
9 September 2015	Pakistan	Governor of Sindh Dr Ishrat-ul-Ibad Khan conferred an honorary doctorate degree upon by University of Karachi (KU) at Governor House.
2015 & 2018	India	Mufaddal Saifuddin, was elected as Aligarh Muslim University's new Chancellor on 11 April 2015. He was re-elected as the Chancellor for a second term on 2 December 2018.
2014 to 2024	Jordan	Syedna Mufaddal Saifuddin was named one of The 500 Most Influential Muslims in the years 2014 to 2025.
23 June 2014	Madagascar	He was awarded Grand Cordon of the National Order of Madagascar.
29 August 2015	Tanzania	During his visit to Moshi, Tanzania, Mufaddal Saifuddin was presented the "Key to Moshi - The Land of Kilimanjaro" by the Mayor Japhary R Michael on 29 August 2015.
20 April 2017	Kenya	Elder of the Order of the Golden Heart, Second Class by President Uhuru Kenyatta on the inauguration of the Al Jamea tus Saifiyah campus in Nairobi.
30 September 2017	Pakistan	Key to Karachi by the Mayor of Karachi, Waseem Akhtar.
30 April 2018	Singapore	A new species of orchid (Note: A cross-breed between Bangkok Fancy and Adisakdi White.) was named as Dendrobium HH Dr. Syedna Mufaddal Saifuddin.
12 December 2022	Kenya	He was awarded Chief of the Order of the Golden Heart (CGH) by President William Ruto.'
7 August 2023	Egypt	Awarded Grand Cordon of the Order of the Nile (Nile Sash Arabic: Wisha al-Neel وشاح النيل) by President Abdel Fattah el-Sisi.
5 December 2023	Pakistan	President of Pakistan Arif Alvi conferred the Nishan e Pakistan on His Holiness Syedna Mufaddal Saifuddin in a special investiture ceremony in Aiwan e Sadr, Islamabad in recognition of the social services rendered by His Holiness for the development of Pakistan.

== Literary works ==
=== Rasāʾil Ramaḍāniyya (Epistles) ===
Syedna Saifuddin's treatises:

ID	Title	Trans title	Orig AH	Pub AH	Pub CE
Taher Saifuddin's Rasa'il
STS48	شموس بركات الربانيين	Shumūs Barakāt al-Rabbāniyyīn	1383	1435	2015
STS49	انهار فيوض الفاطميين	Anhaar Fuyūz al-Fatimiyyeen	1384	1436	2016
Mohammed Burhanuddin's Rasa'il
SMB07	نشر الخير	Nashr al-Khayr	1391	1437	2016
SMB08	ندى الفيوضات	Nadā al-Fūyūdāt	1392	1438	2017
SMB09	سلسبيل روض القدس	Salsabīl Rawd al-Quds	1393	1439	2018
SMB10	بركات دعاة الستر	Barakāt Duāt al-Satr	1394	1440	2019
Mufaddal Saifuddin's Rasa'il
SMS00	حكمة الغيبة القدسانية الابدية	Hikmat al-Ghaybat al-Qudsāniyyat al-Abadiyya	1435	1436	2016
SMS01	شكر نعم اصحاب البركات	Shukr Ne'am As'hāb al-Barakāt	1436	1437	2017
SMS02	جامعة ثمرات العلوم	Jāmiʿat Thamarāt al-ʿUlūm	1437	1438	2018
SMS03	فيوضات يمنية طيبة	Fūyūdāt Yamaniyyat Taiyyeba	1438	1439	2019
SMS04	ملتقى سفينة البركات	Multaqā Safīnat al-Barakāt	1439	1440	2019
SMS05	دفينة مفاخر ال النبي الطهر	Dafīnat Mafākhir āl al-Nabi al-Tuhr	1440	1441	2020

=== Qasidah (Poetry) ===
#	Matla	Language	Style	Occasion
1435 ھ
1	الم بدين الله ادهى الشدائد	Arabic	Elegy	
2	اے الله نا داعي نبي نا پيارا	Lisan al-Dawat	Elegy	
3	اناجيك رب العالمين مبسملا.	Arabic	Munajat	Laylat al-Qadr
4	سلام على ال النبي الاكارم.	Arabic	Qasida	Eid al-Fitr
1436 ھ
5	عليك سلام الله و الصلوات	Arabic	Elegy	Urs
6	اناجيك ربي اليك التجائي	Arabic	Munajat	Laylat al-Qadr
7	اتيت بابك كعبة القبل.	Arabic	Qasida	Eid al-Fitr
8	چلو اے پیارا عزیزو چلو	Lisan al-Dawat	Nasihat	Eid al-Adha
9	علم الانسان مالم یعلم ايك اعزاز ہے	Urdu	Nazm	At Aligarh Muslim University
1437 ھ
10	جئتك ربي تائبا عابدا.	Arabic	Munajat	Laylat al-Qadr
11	يا بني الخمسة انتم وزري	Arabic	Qasida	Eid al-Fitr
1438 ھ
12	دعوت اله العالمين مناجيا.	Arabic	Munajat	Laylat al-Qadr
13	يا طيب العصر طيب طوبى	Arabic	Qasida	Eid al-Fitr
14	روجو برادر حسين نے روجو	Lisan al-Dawat	Marsiya	Eid al-Adha
1439 ھ
15	ا مالك يوم الدين اياك نعبد	Arabic	Munajat	Laylat al-Qadr
16	اھل بيت النبي خذوا بيدي	Arabic	Qasida	Eid al-Fitr
17	يا حسينا پر هميى قربان چهے قربان چهے	Lisan al-Dawat	Marsiya	Eid al-Adha
1440 ھ
18	يابن الحسين يا امام العصر * بفضلك اقبل سجدات الشكر	Arabic	Qasida	Muharram (Thanking for Dream of Imam uz zaman)
19	ايا رب اوزعني لاشكر دائبا	Arabic	Munajat	Laylat al-Qadr
20	فديتك يا طيب العترة	Arabic	Qasida	Eid al-Fitr
1441 ھ
21	اناجيك يا رازق العافية	Arabic	Munajat	Laylat al-Qadr
22	اهل بيت الوحي اهل الكرم	Arabic	Qasida	Eid al-Fitr
23	ذكر الحسين خير زاد الذاكرين	Arabic	Marsiya	Eid al-Ghadeer
1442 ھ
24	دعوتك ذا الرحمة الواسعة	Arabic	Munajat	Laylat al-Qadr
25	يا طيب الفاطميين بني فاطمة	Arabic	Qasida	Eid al-Fitr
1443 ھ
26	ايا ربنا نبتغي الوسيلة	Arabic	Munajat	Laylat al-Qadr
27	رجائي انتم ال النبي	Arabic	Qasida	Eid al-Fitr
1444 ھ
28	فزت فوزا اذ انادي يا علي	Arabic	Qasida	Najaf trip
29	اتاك الهي رجاك الهي	Arabic	Munajat	Laylat al-Qadr
30	فاطمي عين الحيوة امامي	Arabic	Qasida	Eid al-Fitr
31	حسيني دنو غم سي ايا	Lisan al-Dawat	Marasiya	Eid al-Adha
1445ھ
32	دعوتك ارحم الرحماء فارحم	Arabic	Munajat	Laylat al-Qadr
33	ال النبي ائمتي حبي لكم	Arabic	Qasida	Eid al-Fitr
34	کربلاء میرے آقا سدهارے	Urdu	Marasiya	Eid al-Adha
1446ھ
35	عبدك يرجو فانت مولاه	Arabic	Munajat	Laylat al-Qadr
36	سبحتي طيب الوجود مديحك	Arabic	Qasida	Eid al-Fitr
1447ھ
37	سواري غم ني آوي كربلا ما	Lisan al-Dawat	Marasiya	Muharram
38	عبدك ربي إليك محتاج	Arabic	Munajat	Laylat al-Qadr
39	بني الوحي فيكم نزل الذكر بالحمد	Arabic	Qasida	Eid al-Fitr

== Ashara Mubaraka ==
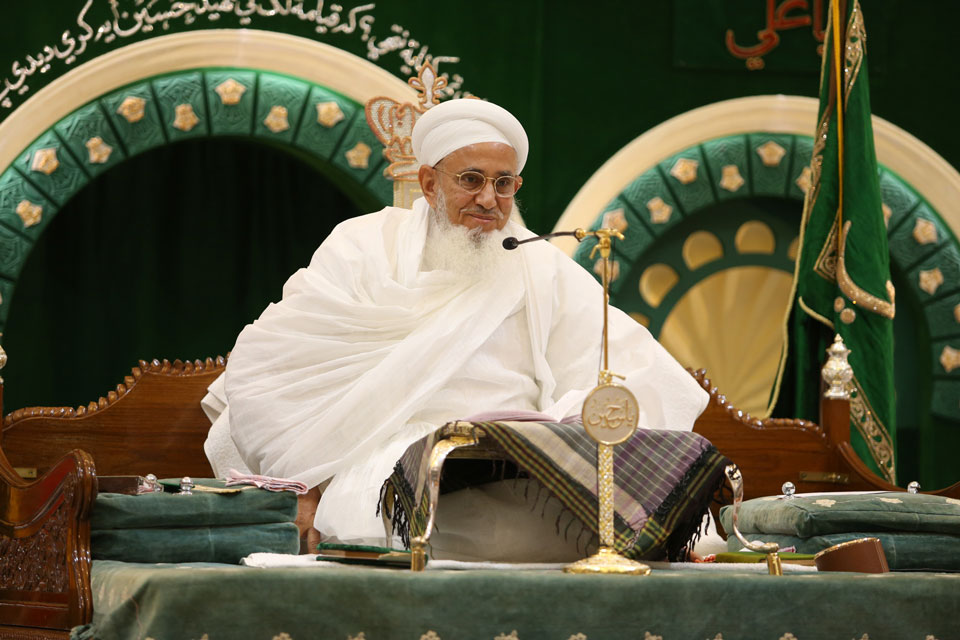
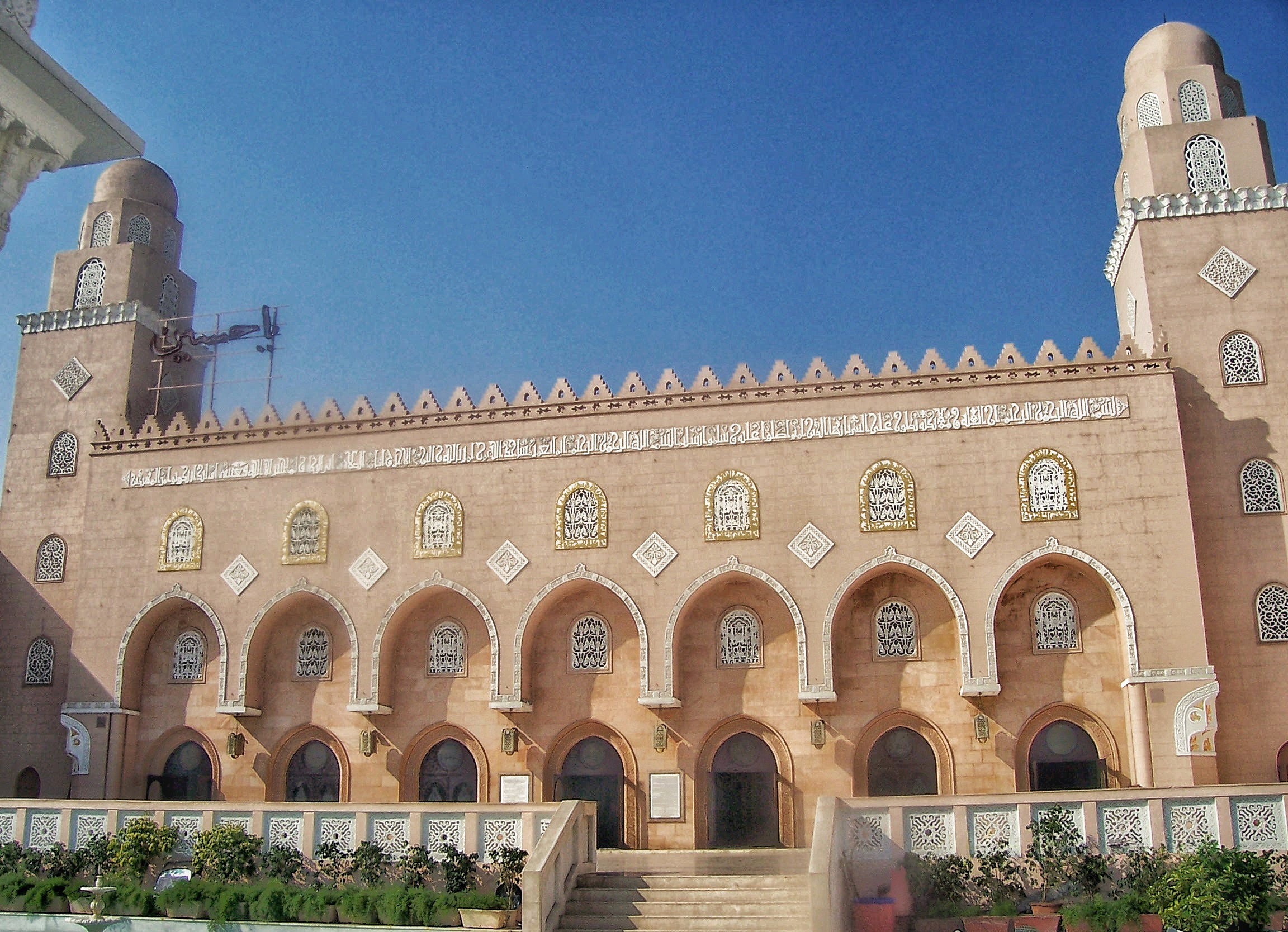
Left: Saifuddin at an Ashara Mubaraka gathering at Mohammedi Masjid (Houston). Right: Masjid e Moazzam, the venue of Saifuddin's first Ashara Mubaraka (Surat).

The Ashara Mubaraka (Arabic: عشرة مباركه, lit. 'the blessed ten') is an annual mourning of Husayn ibn Ali's martyrdom at the Battle of Karbala. In the tradition of the Fatimids, the Da'i al-Mutlaq delivers ten wa'az (Persian: وعظ, lit. 'sermons') on Islamic philosophy, history, liturgy, expository, horatory over 9 days: One wa'az each day for 8 days starting 2nd Muharram and two on the final day of Ashura (Urdu: عاشوراء), the 10th of Muharram. Every year the Da'i al-Mutlaq selects a city to host the Ashara at which, at times, attract 100,000 to 200,000 azadar-e Husayn (Urdu: عزادارِ حسين, lit. 'mourners of Husayn'). The ashara wa'az from the host city is, on occasion, broadcast to various venues around the world. Pilgrims are often provided with free accommodation, transportation, and meals. The faculty of Funun al-Quran, a department of Aljamea-tus-Saifiyah, oversees elaborate Tazyeen (lit. 'decor') of the host venue.

Ashara Mubaraka venues since 2014
CE	AH	City	Province	Country	Continent	Start	End	Attendees
2014	1436	Surat	Gujarat	India	Asia	25 October	2 November	200,000
2015	1437	Houston	Texas	United States	North America	14 October	22 October	25,000
2016	1438	Dar es Salaam	Dar es Salaam Region	Tanzania	Africa	3 October	11 October	32,000
2017	1439	Karachi	Sindh	Pakistan	Asia	22 September	30 September	65,000
2018	1440	Indore	Madhya Pradesh	India	Asia	12 September	20 September	210,000
2019	1441	Colombo	Western Province	Sri Lanka	Asia	1 September	9 September	28,000
2020	1442	Khandala (Note: During the Ashara Mubaraka in August 2020, as Mosques remained closed inline with government regulations due to COVID-19 pandemic, previous years sermons by Taher Saifuddin, Mohammed Burhanuddin, and Mufaddal Saifuddin were broadcast online to the community worldwide.)	Maharashtra	India	Asia	20 August	28 August	NA
2021	1443	Nairobi	Nairobi County	Kenya	Africa	10 August	18 August	NA
2022	1444	London	England	United Kingdom	Europe	30 July	7 August	12,500
2023	1445	Dubai	Emirate of Dubai	United Arab Emirates	Asia	19 July	27 July	75,000
2024	1446	Karachi	Sindh	Pakistan	Asia	8 July	16 July	Estimated 81,000
2025	1447	Madras	Tamil Nadu	India	Asia	27 June	5 July	43,000
2026	1448	London	England	United Kingdom	Europe	16 June	24 June	Estimated 12,000

== Succession ==
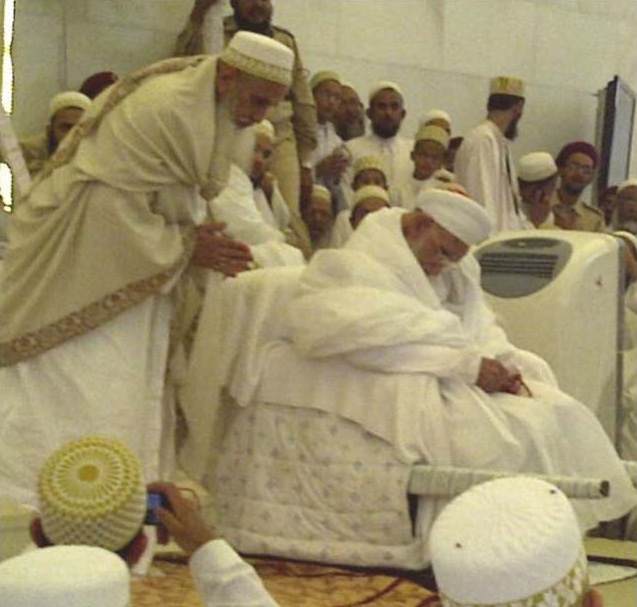
Burhanuddin confers nass on his son Saifuddin at a gathering at Raudat Tahera, 2011.

The 52nd Da'i al-Mutlaq of the Dawoodi Bohras, Syedna Mohammed Burhanuddin, died on 17 January 2014. As per the tenets of the faith each predecessor must nominate a successor during his lifetime. His demise sparked questions about the line of succession when Khuzaima Qutbuddin asserted his right to succession against Mufaddal Saifuddin.

The challenge created a divide within the community, with the majority aligning with Mufaddal Saifuddin and a smaller number aligning with Khuzaima Qutbuddin. Mufaddal Saifuddin took control of the Dawoodi Bohra administration and community infrastructure. In March 2014, Qutbuddin filed civil suit 337/2014 in the Bombay High Court against Saifuddin in which he sought a declaration that he was validly appointed as the 53rd Dai al-Mutlaq. After hearings spanning ten years, on 23 April 2024 the Bombay High Court dismissed the suit that challenged Syedna Mufaddal Saifuddin's position. The court dismissed Khuzaima Qutbuddin's claim, which was pursued by his son and successor Taher Fakhruddin in 2016 after Qutbuddin died. It upheld Syedna Saifuddin as Dai al-Mutlaq of the Dawoodi Bohras. Taher Fakhruddin has appealed the judgement, but legal observers believe it faces challenges in succeeding given the court's judgement

== Notes ==
Shia Islam titles
Mufaddal Saifuddin Dā'ī al-Mutlaq Born: 20 August 1946
Preceded by Mohammed Burhanuddin	53rd Dā'ī al-Mutlaq; 2014–present	Succeeded by Incumbent
