= Jafar us Sadiq Imaduddin =

Indian Islamic Scholar, Author, and Professor

Shahzada • Syedi Ja'far us Sadiq Imaduddin
- جـعفـرُ ٱلصَّـادِق عِمـادُ ٱلدِّيـن
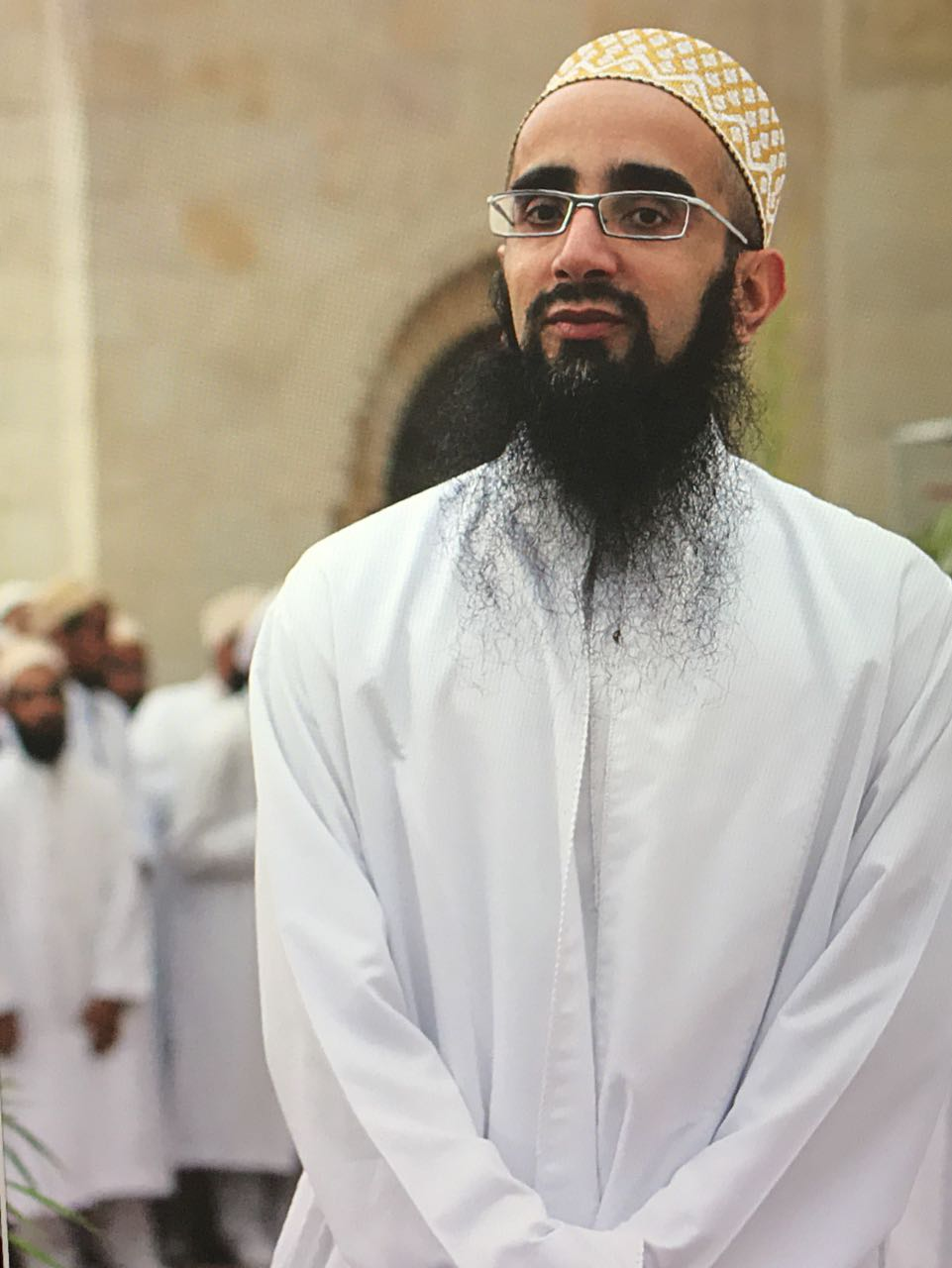
- Imaduddin at an event at Al Jamea tus Saifiyah, Karachi, Pakistan.

Ameer al-Jamea
- Incumbent
- Assumed office 2015
- Preceded by: Mufaddal Saifuddin

Personal life
- Born: Ja'far us Sadiq: 21 September 1973 (age 52); (24 Sha'ban 1393 ھ)
- Spouse: Zaenab (nee Shabbir Nuruddin) (m. 1996)
- Children: 2
- Parents: Mufaddal Saifuddin (father); Jawharatusharaf Najmuddin (mother)
- Notable works: Al Aqmar: A Living Testimony to the Fatemiyeen (2000); Al Juyushi: A Vision of the Fatemiyeen (2002); أدب المناظرة والحجاج في المجالس المؤيدية (2013)
- Education: University of Cairo; Aljamea tus Saifiyah
- Known for: Research on Fatimid architecture; Religious discourses
- Other name: Imaduddin (Laqab)
- Occupation: Scholar, author
- Relatives: Taha Najmuddin (brother); Husain Burhanuddin (brother); Mohammed Burhanuddin (grand father); Qaidjoher Ezzuddin (uncle)

Religious life
- Religion: Shi'a Islam
- Sect: Ismailism; Dawoodi Bohra
- Jurisprudence: Musta‘lī; Tayyibi

Shahzada Syedi Ja'far us Sadiq Imaduddin (Arabic: جـعفـرُ ٱلصَّـادِق عِمـادُ ٱلدِّيـن) or Jafar us Sadiq Mufaddal Saifuddin, is the eldest son of Mufaddal Saifuddin, the current incumbent of the office of the 53rd Dawoodi Bohra Da'i al-Mutlaq. He is a poet, scholar, author and one of the three rectors of Aljamea-tus-Saifiyah.

== Education ==
He completed the memorization of the Quran in 1999. In 1997, he earned the degree of Al-Faqih al-Jayyid (MA) in Islamic Fatemi Literature from Aljamea-tus-Saifiyah. He later obtained a Master’s degree in Arabic Literature from ALECSO (Arab League Educational, Cultural and Scientific Organization) in 2005, with a thesis titled "The Receptionist Theory and the Poetry of al-Amir Tamim bin Imam Al-Mu'izz li-Din Allah." In 2013, he completed his PhD in Arabic Literature from ALECSO, focusing his research on "The Art and Science of Dialectic in the Works of Syedna al-Mu’ayyad al-Shirazi."

== Lineage ==
Imaduddin is a direct descendant of the Islamic prophet Muhammad, who was himself a descendant of Abraham, through an unbroken chain of noble and august ancestry. His heritage to Muhammed traces back through Muhammad's daughter, Fatima al-Zahra, and her husband Ali ibn Abi Talib. From Fatima and Ali, the line continues through their son, Imam Hussein, and the subsequent Imams in the Ismaili tradition up to the fifth Imam, Ja'far al-Sadiq. Imaduddin's ancestors include Mir Mahamad Ali, Fakhr al-Din Shaheed, Abd al-Qadir Hakimuddin, Khanji Pheer and Syedi Lukman who were direct descendants of Ja'far al-Sadiq.

== Career ==
He is a Senior Fellow at the Royal Aal al-Bayt Institute for Islamic Thought and is also a signatory of the Amman Message, which is a declaration calling for tolerance and unity in the Muslim world that was issued on 9 November 2004 (27th of Ramadan 1425 Hijri) by Abdullah II of Jordan.

He was appointed one of the rectors of Aljamea-tus-Saifiyah (Arabic: امير الجامعة) on 27 Rajab 1436H corresponding to 15 May 2015 by Mufaddal Saifuddin.

== Personal life ==
Imaduddin is married to Zaenab (née Nuruddin), daughter of Shabbir Nuruddin. On March 1st 2026, he became a father to twins, a daughter, Fatema, and a son, Hussein.

== Recognition and awards ==
- India: On 15 May 2015 at a public gathering in Surat:
- India: On 3 May 2016 at a public gathering in Surat, he was conferred two of the highest degrees of Aljamea tus Saifiyah:

== Works ==
- A literary analysis of the Qasida (Arabic: شب الغرام لهيب خد احمر) by Miya Saheb Wali bhai (Arabic: ميا صاحب ولي بهائي). This work was completed in 1418 Hijri and is titled (Arabic: شفاء الاوام في قصيدة شب الغرام ).
- During the restoration of Fatimid mosques in Cairo by Syedna Mohammed Burhanuddin, he compiled separate works, in Arabic, on the architectural features of each of the mosques. These works studied Al-Jami' al-Anwar, Al-Jami' al-Aqmar, Al-Jami' al-Juyushi, Al-Jami' al-Lulua and Fatimid gates and fortifications of Cairo.
- Al Aqmar: A Living Testimony to the Fatemiyeen (2000).
- Al Juyushi: A Vision of the Fatemiyeen (2002).
- Arabic: دراسة لشعر الامير تميم من منظور نظرية التلقي. Thesis title: The Receptionist Theory and the Poetry of al-Amir Tamim bin Imam Al-Mu'izz li-Din Allah.
- Arabic: ادب المناظرة والحجاج في المجالس المؤيدية. Research focus: The art and science of dialectic in the works of Syedna al-Mu’ayyad al-Shirazi.
- Qasida in Urdu: منة كرو عناية ايك قطرة بس عسل كا in 2015.
