= Qaidjoher Ezzuddin =

Indian Islamic Leader

Syedi Qaidjoher Ezzuddin Mazoon al-Da'wat
- ٱلقَـائِـد جوهـر عِـزُّ ٱلـدِّين
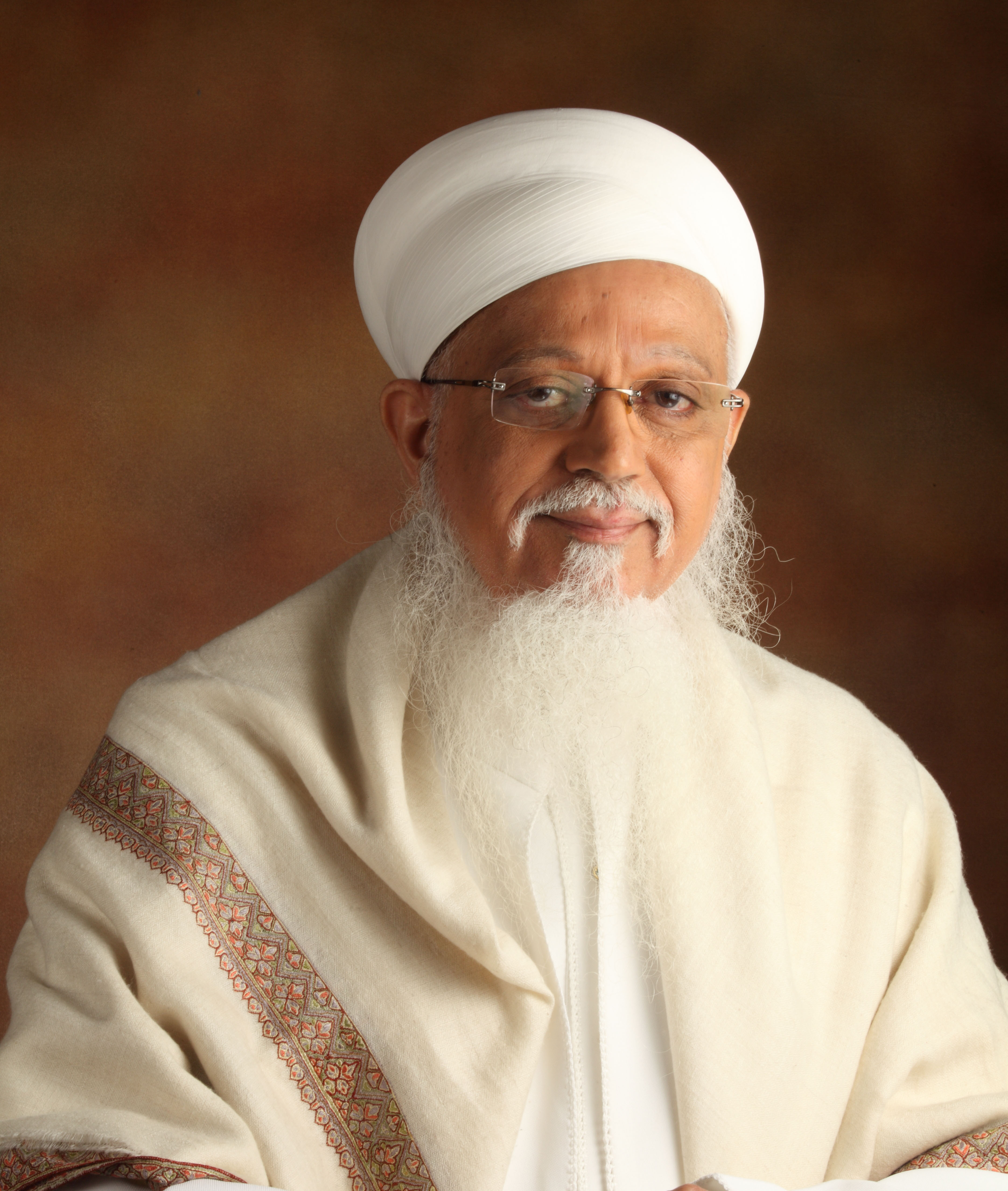

Ameer al-Jamea
- Incumbent
- Assumed office 1987
- Preceded by: Yusuf Najmuddin

Mazoon al-Da'wat
- Incumbent
- Assumed office June 2024
- Preceded by: Ali Asgar Kalimuddin
- Title: Syedi; Mazoon al-Da'wat il-Haq

Personal life
- Born: Qaidjoher; 27 November 1942 (age 83) India
- Home town: London, United Kingdom
- Spouse: Samina Ezzuddin
- Children: Taher; Ibrahim; Aliasghar; Tasneem; Zainab
- Parents: Mohammed Burhanuddin (father); Aaisaheba Amatullah (mother)
- Education: Aljamea tus Saifiyah
- Relatives: Mufaddal Saifuddin (brother); Malik al-Ashtar Shujauddin (brother); Ja'far us Sadiq Imaduddin (nephew); Taher Saifuddin (grand father)

Religious life
- Religion: Shi'a Islam
- Sect: Ismailism; Dawoodi Bohra
- Jurisprudence: Musta‘lī; Tayyibi

Mazoon al-Da'wat Shahzada Qaidjoher Ezzuddin (Arabic: ٱلقـائِـد جوهـر عِـزُّ ٱلـدِّين) is the eldest son of Mohammed Burhanuddin, the grandson of Taher Saifuddin, and elder brother of the incumbent 53rd Dai al-Mutlaq Mufaddal Saifuddin. He is one of the four rectors of Al Jamea tus Saifiyah.

== Personal life ==
Qaidjoher Ezzuddin was born on 27 November 1942 (19 Dhu al-Qi'dah 1361 Hijri). He is the eldest son of Mohammed Burhanuddin, thus Mohammed Burhanuddin selected his teknonymic kunya as Abu-al-Qaidjoher (Arabic: ابو القائد جوهر).

== Career ==
Ezzuddin has served under the administration of Dawat-e-Hadiyah under the Da'i al-Mutlaq for over 50 years and has administered numerous community development and public relation projects. He also heads the legal department of Dawat-e-Hadiyah missions in governing the various trusts and foundations of the Dawoodi Bohra community.

In 1987 (1407 Hijri) Ezzuddin was appointed one of four the rectors of Al Jamea tus Saifiyah. He also headed the Dawoodi Bohra youth organization Shabab ul-Eidiz Zahabi.

Ezzuddin was also a member of the Haj Committee of India from June 1999 to March 2003. He is the Chairman of the Saifee Hospital Trust and the Saifee Burhani Upliftment Trust (SBUT).

Ezzuddin headed the project for the revival and restoration of the Great Mosque of Kufa in 2010, during the tenure of Mohammed Burhanuddin.

Ezzuddin was appointed by Mohammed Burhanuddin as one of the witnesses of the Nass on Mufaddal Saifuddin, his brother, in 2005. In 2011, he was instructed to make a public announcement of this appointment in a Majlis held in al Masjid ul Husseini in Northolt; London on 5 June 2011. The video of this Majlis was recorded and was broadcast on the same day in Dawoodi Bohra community centers worldwide.

Ezzuddin was appointed in the position of Mukasir by the 53rd Dai al-Mutlaq, Mufaddal Saifuddin, on 27 Jumada al-Thani 1440H (4 March 2019).

Ezzuddin was elevated in the position of Mazoon by the 53rd Dai al-Mutlaq, Mufaddal Saifuddin, on 18 Dhu al-Hijja 1445H (24 June 2024).

== Lineage ==
Ezzuddin is a direct descendant of the Islamic Prophet Mohammed, who was himself a descendant of the Prophet Abraham, through an unbroken chain of noble and august ancestry. His heritage to the Prophet Mohammed traces back through the Prophet's daughter, Fatima al-Zahra, and her husband Ali ibn Abi Talib. From Fatima and Ali, the line continues through their son, Imam Hussein, and the subsequent Imams in the Ismaili tradition up to the fifth Imam, Ja'far al-Sadiq. Ezzuddin's ancestors include Mir Mahamad Ali, Fakhr al-Din Shaheed, Abd al-Qadir Hakimuddin, Khanji Pheer and Syedi Lukman who were direct descendants of Ja'far al-Sadiq.

== Recognition ==
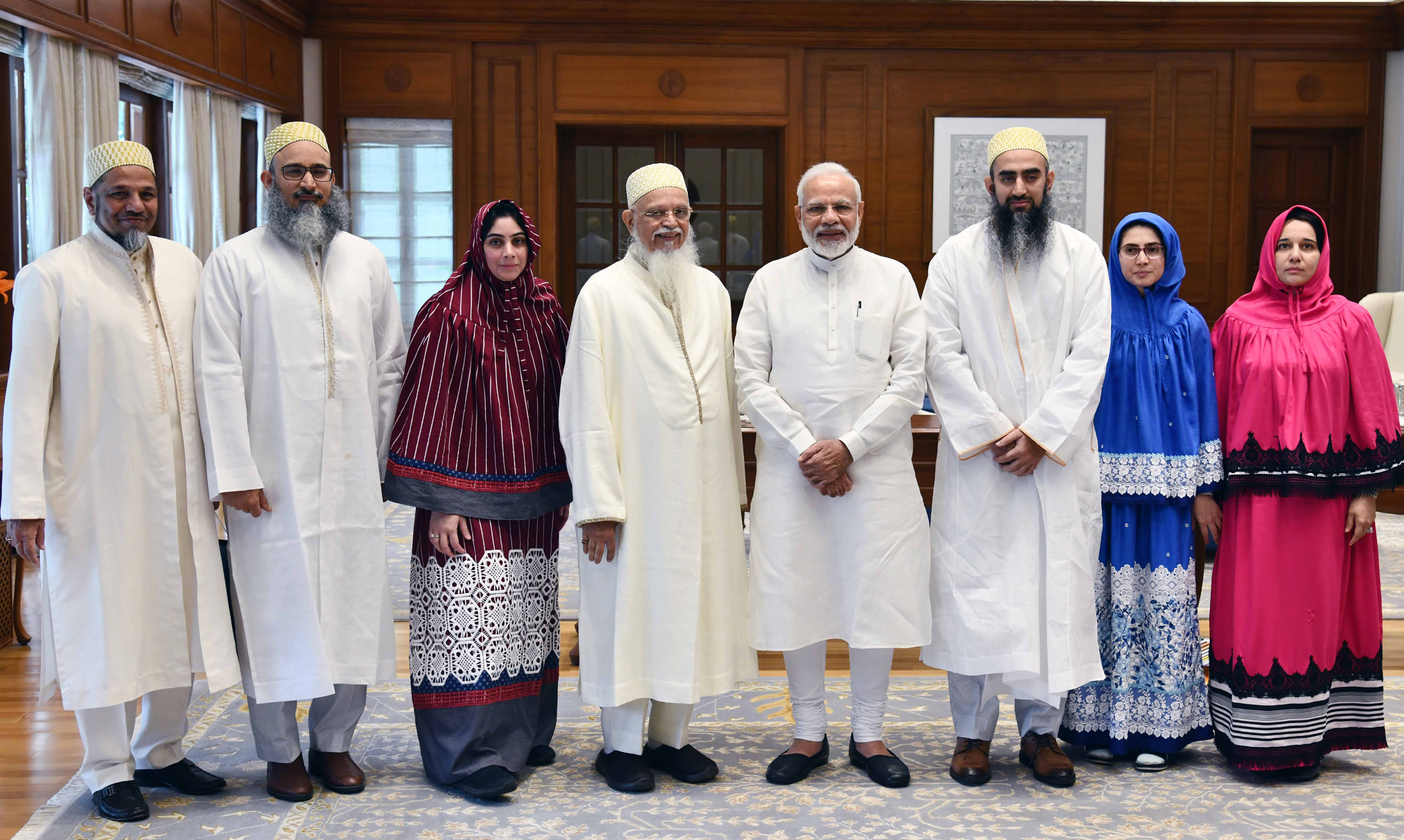
From third left (to right): Naqiyah Burhanuddin, Qaidjoher Ezzuddin, Narendra Modi, and Husain Burhanuddin on 16 August 2019 at the Prime Minister's Office, New Delhi.

- India - Ezzuddin's mithaq (lit. 'pledge of allegiance') was taken by his grand father Taher Saifuddin on the 27th of Dhu al-Qi'dah 1379H (22 May 1960 AD), during the 75th birthday celebrations of Taher Saifuddin.
- Sri Lanka - The Open International University for Complementary Medicines, Sri Lanka conferred upon Ezzuddin the degree of Doctor of Philosophy (Honoris Causa - Spirituality) in January 2011.
- United States - On 23 October 1995 Ezzuddin was presented the Key to the City of Irving, Texas by Dr. Morris Parrish.
- United Kingdom - Ezzuddin was awarded an Honorary Degree of Doctor of Business Administration from the University of East London on 20 November 2013.
