= Al-Jayyid =

Al-Jayyid الجيد Al-Jid, al-Jayyad
- Village
- Location in Syria
- Coordinates: 35°33′13″N 36°18′41″E
- Country: Syria
- Governorate: Hama
- District: Suqaylabiyah
- Subdistrict: Qalaat al-Madiq

Population (2004)
  - Total: 2,242
- Time zone: UTC+3 (AST)
- City Qrya Pcode: C3202

Al-Jayyid (Arabic: الجيد, also spelled al-Jid or al-Jayyad) is a village in northern Syria located in the Qalaat al-Madiq Subdistrict of the al-Suqaylabiyah District in Hama Governorate. According to the Syria Central Bureau of Statistics (CBS), al-Jayyid had a population of 2,242 in the 2004 census. Its inhabitants are predominantly Alawites.

As of April 2025, the village had a population of 2,986.
