= Long Live Egypt =

Long Live Egypt تحيا مصر
- Founded: 20 August 2014
- House of Representatives: 0 / 568

Long Live Egypt is an electoral alliance in Egypt that will compete in the 2015 Egyptian parliamentary election.

== Affiliated parties ==
- New Dawn Party
- Egyptian Revolution Party
