= Malik ul Ashtar Shujauddin =

Indian Islamic leader (born 1948)

Malekulashter Shujauddin
- مالِكُ الاشتَر شُجاع الدين

Ameer al-Jamea
- Incumbent
- Assumed office 2018
- Preceded by: Syedi Qaidjoher Ezzuddin

Personal life
- Born: Malekulashter; 2 May 1948 (age 78)
- Home town: Houston, United States
- Spouse: Tasneem
- Children: 4
- Parent: Mohammed Burhanuddin (father)
- Education: Aljamea tus Saifiyah
- Relatives: Taher Saifuddin (grand father); Mufaddal Saifuddin (brother); Husain Burhanuddin (son in law)

Religious life
- Religion: Shi'a Islam
- Sect: Ismailism; Dawoodi Bohra
- Jurisprudence: Musta‘lī; Tayyibi

Shahzada Malekulashter Shujauddin is the third son of Mohammed Burhanuddin II, the 52nd Dai al-Mutlaq of Dawoodi Bohras, a branch of Tayyabi Mustaali Ismaili Shi'a Islam.

== Personal life ==
Malekulashter was born on 2 May 1948 (23 Jumada al-Thani 1367 ھ) to Mohammed Burhanuddin and Aaisaheba Amatullah.

Naqiyah, Shujauddin's daughter, is married to Husain Burhanuddin, the youngest son of Mufaddal Saifuddin. Naqiyah runs the Rawdat al-Quran School (Note: A school focused on Quranic studies based in Mumbai.) in South Bombay.

== Career ==
Shujauddin was one of the witnesses of private nass by Mohammed Burhanuddin, his father, on Mufaddal Saifuddin, his brother, in 2011 in London.

Shujauddin was appointed as one of the four rectors of Aljamea tus Saifiyah (Arabic: امير الجامعة) on 20 Rajab al-Asab 1439ھ corresponding to 5 April 2018 by Mufaddal Saifuddin, the 53rd Dai al-Mutlaq.

Shujauddin is the head of Tolaba ul-Kulliyat il-Mumenoon, a volunteer-run community-service organisation of Dawoodi Bohra students, established by his grandfather 51st Dai al-Mutlaq Taher Saifuddin. As of 2020, Tolaba has around 5000 members in 133 locations world-wide.

In recent years, Shujauddin has presided over Ashara Mubaraka (Note: Ashara Mubaraka (Arabic: عشرة مباركه, lit. 'the blessed ten') is an annual mourning of Husayn ibn Ali's martyrdom at Battle of Karbala.) sermons in Mumbai, Houston, Chicago, Kuwait and Karbala.

== Lineage ==
Shujauddin is a direct descendant of the Islamic Prophet Mohammed, who was himself a descendant of the Prophet Abraham, through an unbroken chain of noble and august ancestry. His heritage to the Prophet Mohammed traces back through the Prophet's daughter, Fatima al-Zahra, and her husband Ali ibn Abi Talib. From Fatima and Ali, the line continues through their son, Imam Hussein, and the subsequent Imams in the Ismaili tradition up to the fifth Imam, Ja'far al-Sadiq. Shujauddin's ancestors include Mir Mahamad Ali, Fakhr al-Din Shaheed, Abd al-Qadir Hakimuddin, Khanji Pheer and Syedi Lukman who were direct descendants of Ja'far al-Sadiq.

== North America ==
In 1978, Shujauddin visited the Bay Area for the first time as a representative of his father, Burhanuddin, to establish an official jamaat (Note: A religious governance organisation appointed by the Dai al-Mutlaq under the purview of Dawat-e-Hadiyah that oversees spiritual, religious, administrative, and temporal affairs of the Dawoodi Bohra community.) for the Dawoodi Bohra community.

In 1996, Shujauddin's father inaugurated Mohammedi Masjid and presided over Milad al Nabi in Houston. Since then, Shujauddin resides in Houston and made Houston as his second home, and leads the Dawoodi Bohra community of the United States. Apart from Houston, Shujauddin also frequently visits Dallas, San Antonio, Plano and New York City.

In 2001, on invitation extended by Shujauddin, his father presided over Ashara Mubaraka in Houston. Over 10,000 Dawoodi Bohras from around the world gathered for the occasion. Later in 2015, Shujauddin's invitation for Ashara Mubaraka to be held at the newly renovated Mohammedi Masjid in Houston was accepted by his brother 53rd Dai al-Mutlaq, Mufaddal Saifuddin, and the event attracted around 25,000 members of the community from world over.
