= Aljamea-tus-Saifiyah =

Private Islamic research university

- الجامعۃ السـیفیۃ
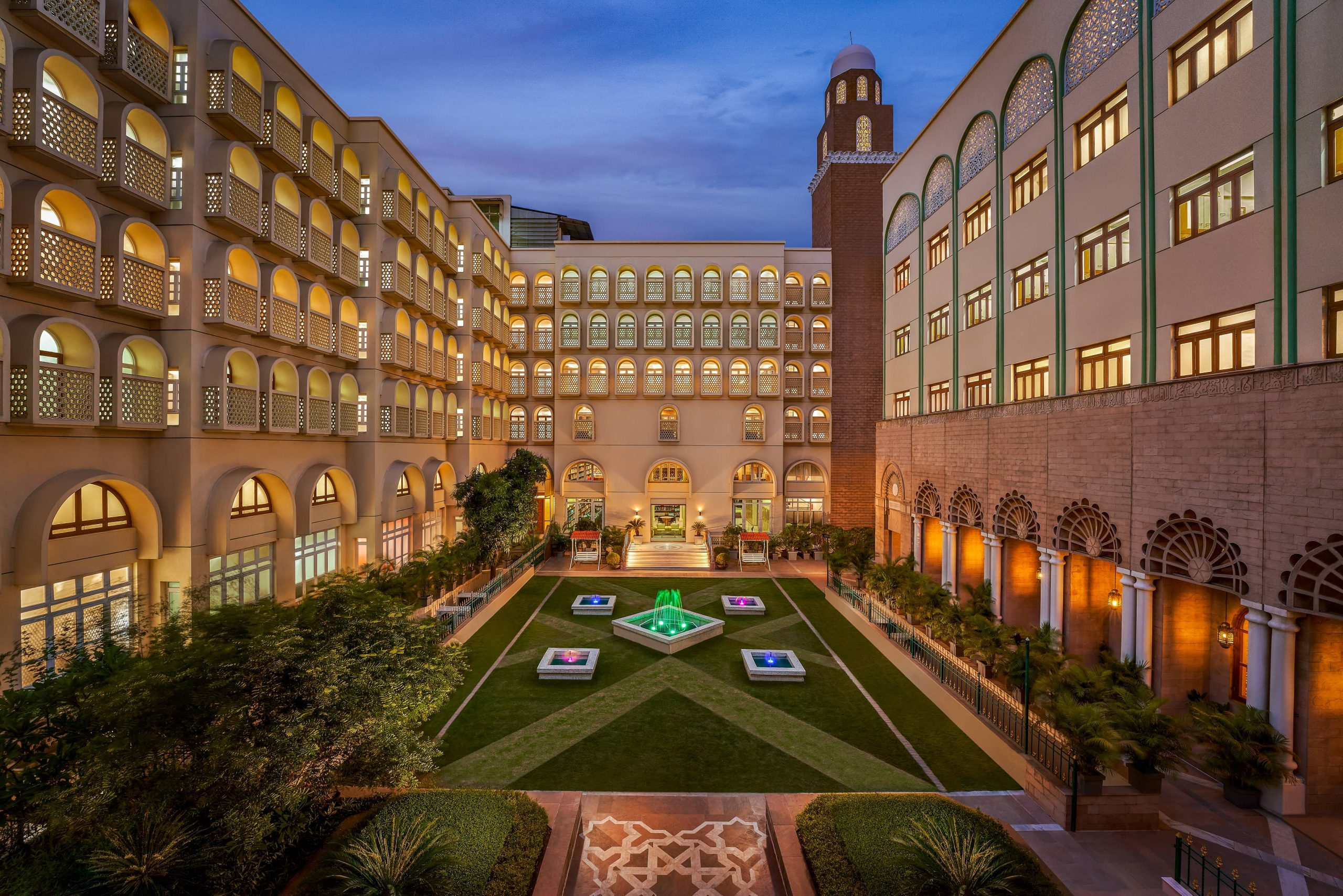
- Aljamea tus Saifiyah Surat Campus
- Former name: Dars-e-Saifee
- Type: Private Theological University
- Established: 1810
- Affiliations: Cambridge International; IGCSE; International Baccalaureate; Al-Azhar University; Aligarh Muslim University; Cairo University
- Chancellor: Dr. Mufaddal Saifuddin
- Rector: Aliasgar Kalimuddin Qaidjoher Ezzuddin Malik ul Ashtar Shujauddin Jafar us Sadiq Imaduddin
- Students: 2500
- Campus: Surat; Karachi; Nairobi; Marol; Sidhpur
- Website: www.jameasaifiyah.edu; mahadalquran.com (Institute of Qur'anic Sciences)

Aljamea-tus-Saifiyah (Note: Arabic: الجامِعةُ السّـيفِيّة, lit. 'The Saifiyah University'; Lisan al-Dawat: الجامعۃ السـیفیۃ; Urdu: جامعۃ سـیفیۃ, romanized: Jamea Saifiyah.) is an Arabic academy dedicated to Islamic learning based in India, Pakistan, and Kenya. Established in Surat as Dars-e Saifee c. 1810 by Abde'Ali Saifuddin, it was after extensive renovation (c. 1960s) and expansion (c. 1980s and c. 2010s) carried out by Taher Saifuddin and Mohammed Burhanuddin, the university gained prominence. Today, as holder of the office of Dāʿī al-Mutlaq, Mufaddal Saifuddin is the sole benefactor of the institute.

== History ==
I have been systematically endeavoring in recent years to restructure this time-honored Aljamea-tus-Saifiyah so as to harmonize its concepts, its curricula and its general outlook and perspective with the dynamics and the demands of the new age, without, at the same time doing any damage to the essentials and fundamentals of its original objectives. It has also been my effort to improve the quality, the standard and the diversity of the knowledge imparted in this institution so as to raise it to the status of a respected academy which would attract scholars from all places and from which would radiate rays of sober wisdom and light.

— Taher Saifuddin

Syedna Abdeali Saifuddin established Dars-e Saifee (Urdu: درسِ سيفي, lit. 'Saifee School'), a theology school for the Dawoodi Bohra community, in 1810.

The 51st Dai al-Mutlaq, Taher Saifuddin introduced secular and scientific subjects in the 1960s and gave it the present name of Aljamea-tus-Saifiyah, and admitted its first female students. Mohammed Burhanuddin undertook a complete renovation and expansion of the campus buildings.

In 1969, during his 57th birthday celebration, Mohammed Burhanuddin established Aljamea-tus-Saifiyah in Karachi, Pakistan. The construction of this 14-acre campus that commenced on same year was completed by Burhanuddin, and inaugurated by the President of Pakistan, Mohammed Zia-ul-Haq, on 4 November 1983.

In 2011, during centennial celebrations, Mohammed Burhanuddin established Aljamea-tus-Saifiyah in Nairobi, Kenya. The construction of this 14-acre campus that commenced in 2013 was completed under the reign of Mufaddal Saifuddin, Burhanuddin's son and successor, and inaugurated by the President of Kenya, Uhuru Kenyatta, on 20 April 2017.

In 2013, during golden jubilee celebrations of his throne, Mohammed Burhanuddin established Aljamea-tus-Saifiyah at Marol in Mumbai, India. The construction of this 14-acre campus that commenced in 2015 was completed under the reign of Mufaddal Saifuddin, and was inaugurated by the Prime Minister of India, Narendra Modi, on 10 February 2023.

In 2026, Mufaddal Saifuddin established the fifth campus of Aljamea-tus-Saifiyah in Sidhpur, India, in the wake of the holy month of Ramadan on the day of Eid al-Fitr.

=== Ashara Mubaraka ===
In 2021, Mufaddal Saifuddin delivered Ashara Mubaraka sermons in the Nairobi campus of Aljamea-tus-Saifiyah's Masjid al-Zahra. It marked the first time that Ashara Mubaraka was hosted by Aljamea-tus-Saifiyah.

== Curriculum ==
Its educational focus is the Quran, Islamic sciences, Islamic Jurisprudence, Arabic language, and Literature. Students are sent around the world for religious duties during the Ashara Mubaraka and Ramadan.

A 11-year course of study is divided into three phases: The first phase is four years and involves 55 courses, the second phase is five years, subdivided into three years with 75 courses and two years with 90 subjects, and the last two years of the second phase and the final two-year phase (four years in total) focus on specialization and advanced studies in Islamic and Arabic sciences.

At the end of the 11th year, the students present a dissertation called "المقالة الموسعة" and graduate with the degree of al-Faqih al-Jayyid, and are sent on khidmah (lit. 'community service') to hajj and other pilgrimages at full cost to the office of the Da'i al-Mutlaq. These graduates, as per tradition, invite the Da'i al-Mutlaq for a ziyafat (lit. 'banquet') as a show of gratitude.

The al-Faqih al-Jayyid degree is equivalent to the Masters of Arts from Aligarh Muslim University, recognized by Al Azhar and Cairo University. Four years of study at the university is equivalent to secondary education (GCSE) and seven years is equivalent to Higher Secondary (GCE A Level) post which the students qualify to test for an International Baccalaureate, recognized by Oxford University and others.

== Campuses ==
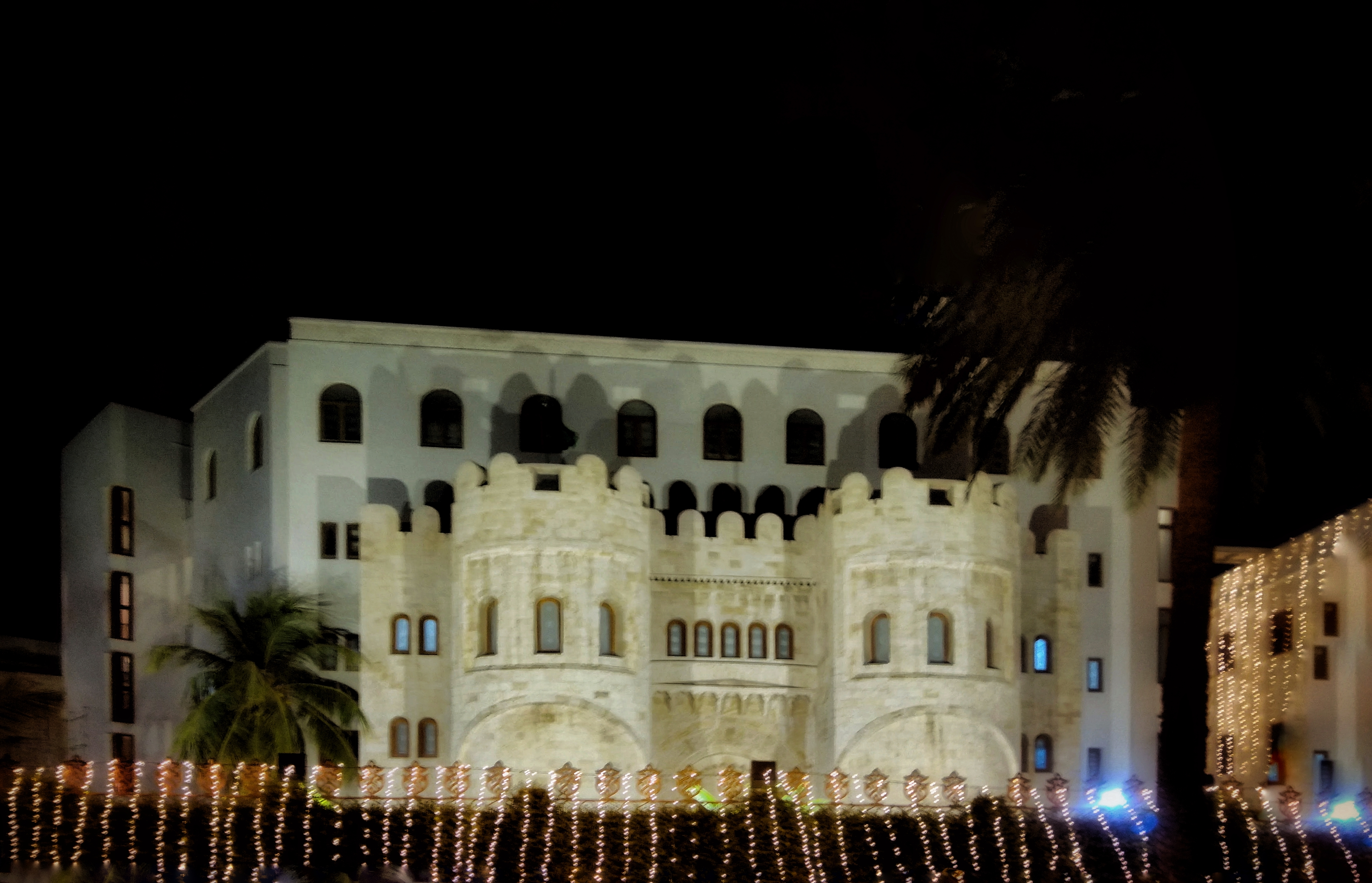
Left: Old entrance gate at Surat Jamea. Right: A Bab al-Futuh replica at the entrance of Aljamea at Hyderi, Karachi.

The principal university campus is situated in Surat (India) with three sister campuses in Karachi (Pakistan), Nairobi (Kenya), and Marol (Mumbai, India).

est. (ھـ)	ing. (ھـ)	City	Country	Continent	Students
1224	1380	Surat	India	Asia	1,000
1389	1404	Karachi	Pakistan	Asia	550
1432	1438	Nairobi	Kenya	Africa	500
1434	1444	Marol, Mumbai	India	Asia	300

=== Surat ===
Mohammed Burhanuddin renovated the Surat campus in c. 1983. The academic block north houses classrooms, administrative offices, Iwaan (a large hall where annual exams are held amongst other events that involve the entire student and teaching faculties), and Al-Masjid al-Fatimi (which sits between the garden and the Iwaan). Opposite to the academic block is a library that houses more than 150,000 books and subscribes to more than 100 periodicals. The Masakin (boys' hostel) and Rabwat (girls' hostel) blocks are adjacent to the academic block.

South of the campus is Devdi Mubarak (lit. 'lord's honorable house'), the Da'i al-Mutlaq's residence, at the end of which is Mahad al-Zahra: An institute for memorization and recitation of Quran, and for Quranic arts and sciences. Further south are Mazar-e Saifee (mausoleum of seven Dua't Mutlaqeen) and Masjid-e Moazzam (lit. 'The Great Mosque').

=== Marol ===
The Prime Minister of India Narendra Modi inaugurated Aljamea's fourth campus in Marol on February 10, 2023.

== Rectors ==
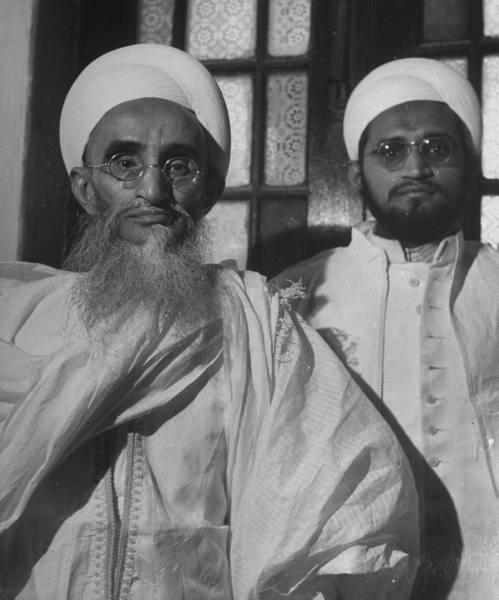
Taher Saifuddin (left) and his son, Ameer al-Jamea, Yusuf Najmuddin (c. 1945).

Following the death of its first rector (Note: Arabic: أمير الجامعة, romanized: Amīr al-Jamea.) post-renovations, Yusuf Najmuddin in 1987 (1407 ھ), Mohammed Burhanuddin appointed four rectors in his place: (Note: Arabic: الأمراء الجامعة, romanized: Umarāʿ al-Jamea.) His two brothers Qasim Hakimuddin, Abbas Fakhurdddin, and his two sons Qaidjoher Ezzuddin and Mufaddal Saifuddin. Mohammed Burhanuddin instructed the newly appointed rectors that in the event that there was a difference of opinion amongst them, then Mufaddal Saifuddin's opinion should take precedence.

Following the death of Mohammed Burhanuddin, on 16 Rabi al-Awwal 1435 ھ (17 January 2014), and Mufaddal Saifuddin's succession as 53rd Dai al-Mutlaq, he appointed his son Jafar us Sadiq Imaduddin as Aljamea's fourth rector.

After the death of Abbas Fakhruddin on 14 February 2018, and of Qasim Hakimuddin shortly thereafter on 5 April 2018 (in Surat), Mufaddal Saifuddin appointed Aliasghar Kalimuddin and Malik-ul Ashtar Shujauddin as Rectors. Aliasgar bhaisaheb Kalimuddin has also died in 2024, leaving one of the seats empty for now.

== See also ==
- MSB Educational Institute
