= Syedi Fakhruddin =

Ismaili martyr

Syedi Fakhruddin Shaheed
- فَخرُ الدّين شَهيد
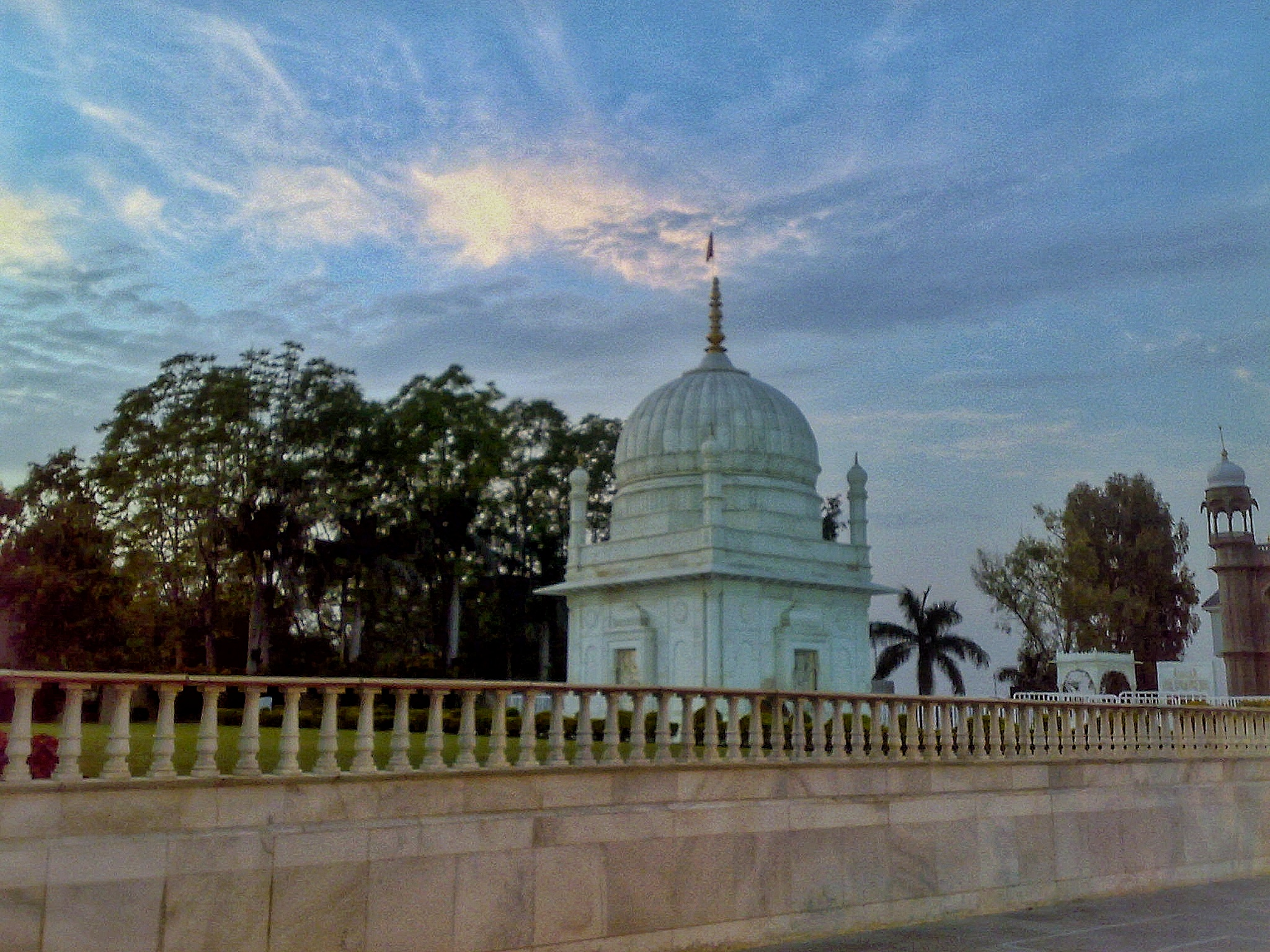
- Mausoleum of Fakhruddin, an early leader of Fatimid Ismaili movement in India.
- Title: Syedi; Maulana
- Resting place: Taherabad, Galiyakot, Rajasthan, India

Religious life
- Religion: Islam
- Sect: Isma'ili; Dawoodi Bohra
- Jurisprudence: Mustaali; Tayyabi

Syedi Fakhruddin Shaheed is the 11th-century holy Ismaili, Fatimid, mustaali saint who was first Ismaili martyr, martyred during missionary work among Bhils local tribal in Rajasthan and buried in Galiakot, India. The mausoleum is the most venerated place amongst his followers.

== Family ==
Syedi Fakhruddin was the son of Jain Raja Tarmal. Raja Tarmal and his brother Raja Bharmal were the first converts by Moulaya Abdullah. Raja Tarmal and Raja Bharmal were ministers of Jayasimha Siddharaja. Syedi Fakhruddin had a son called Moulaya Dawood who is buried in the vicinity of Syedi Fakhruddin's mausoleum.

== Life ==
Syedi Fakhruddin was given responsibility of conducting religious affairs in present day Rajasthan by Moulaya Yaqub, son of Raja Bharmal and representative of Imam Mustansir in India.

== Death ==
On his way from Sagwara to Galiakot, while conducting religious affairs, Syedi Fakhruddin was attacked and killed by a group of brigands on the outskirts of Galiakot.

== Mausoleum ==
The mausoleum of Syedi Fakhruddin was first constructed in 1829 by Syedna Tayyeb Zainuddin, was again renovated by Syedna Taher Saifuddin in 1954 and reconstructed by Syedna Mohammed Burhanuddin.

== Lineage ==
Syedi Fakhruddin is the ancestor of nine Dawoodi Bohra Dais: Syedna Mohammed Ezzuddin, Syedna Tayyeb Zainuddin, Syedna Abdul Qadir Najmuddin, Syedna Abdul Husain Husamuddin, Syedna Mohammed Burhanuddin I, Syedna Abdullah Badruddin, Syedna Taher Saifuddin, Syedna Mohammed Burhanuddin, and Syedna Mufaddal Saifuddin. The tree shown below illustrate the clear link. He is also the ancestor of Syedi Shams Khan (buried in Surat) and Syedi Hasan-ji Badshah (buried in Ujjain).

== Photo gallery ==
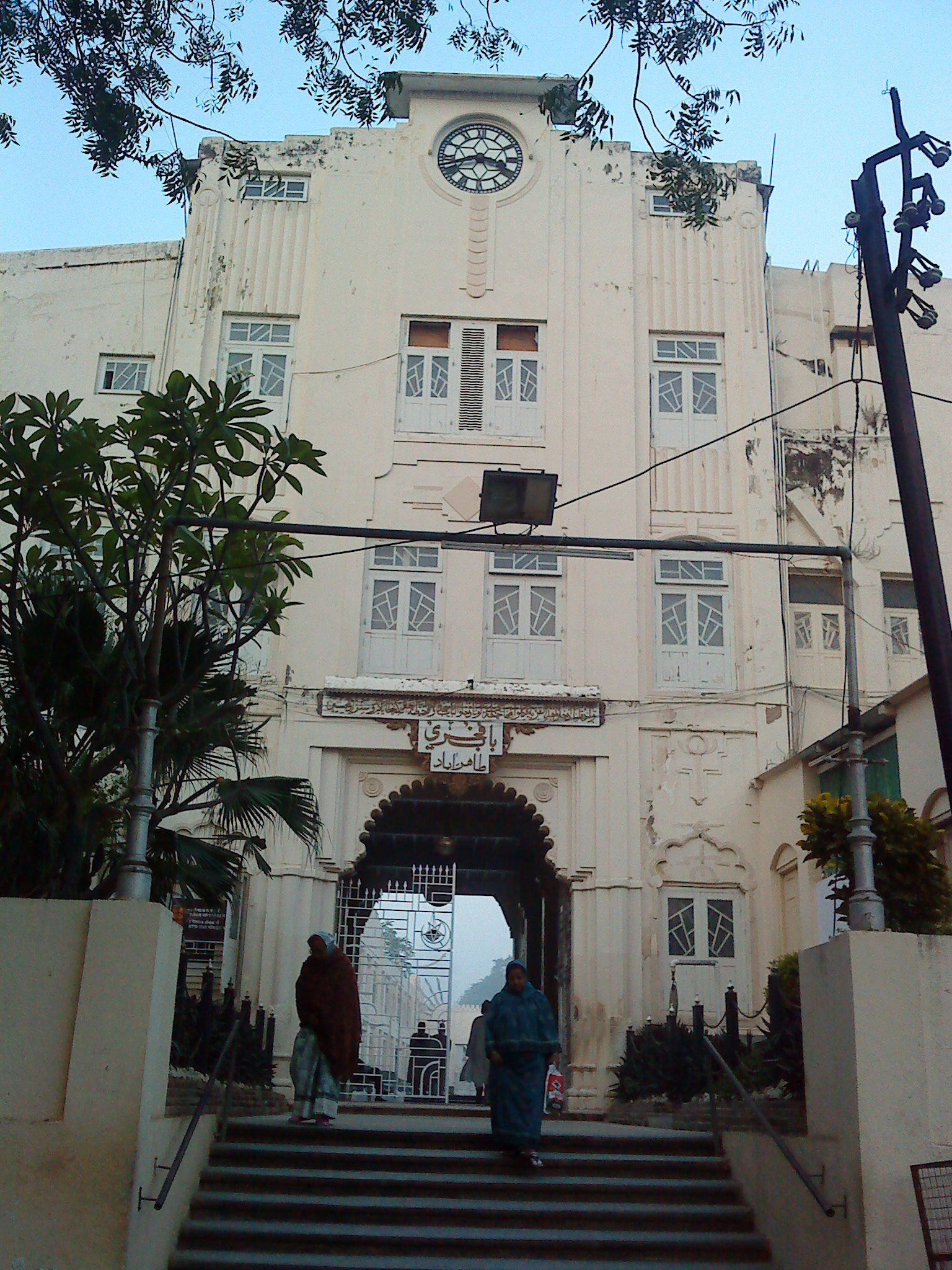
Old Dargah entrance

Dargah Compound

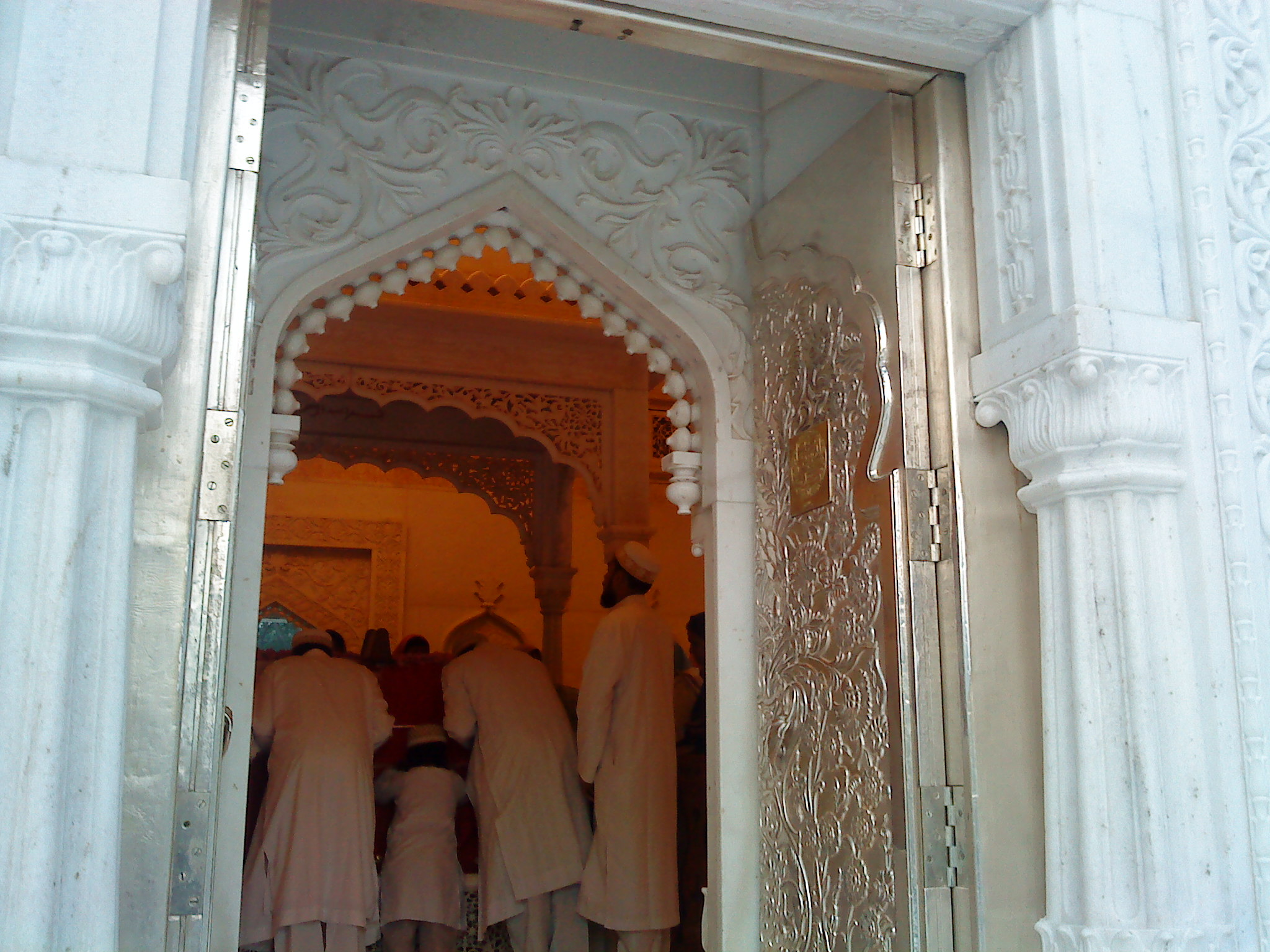
Entrance Mausoleum

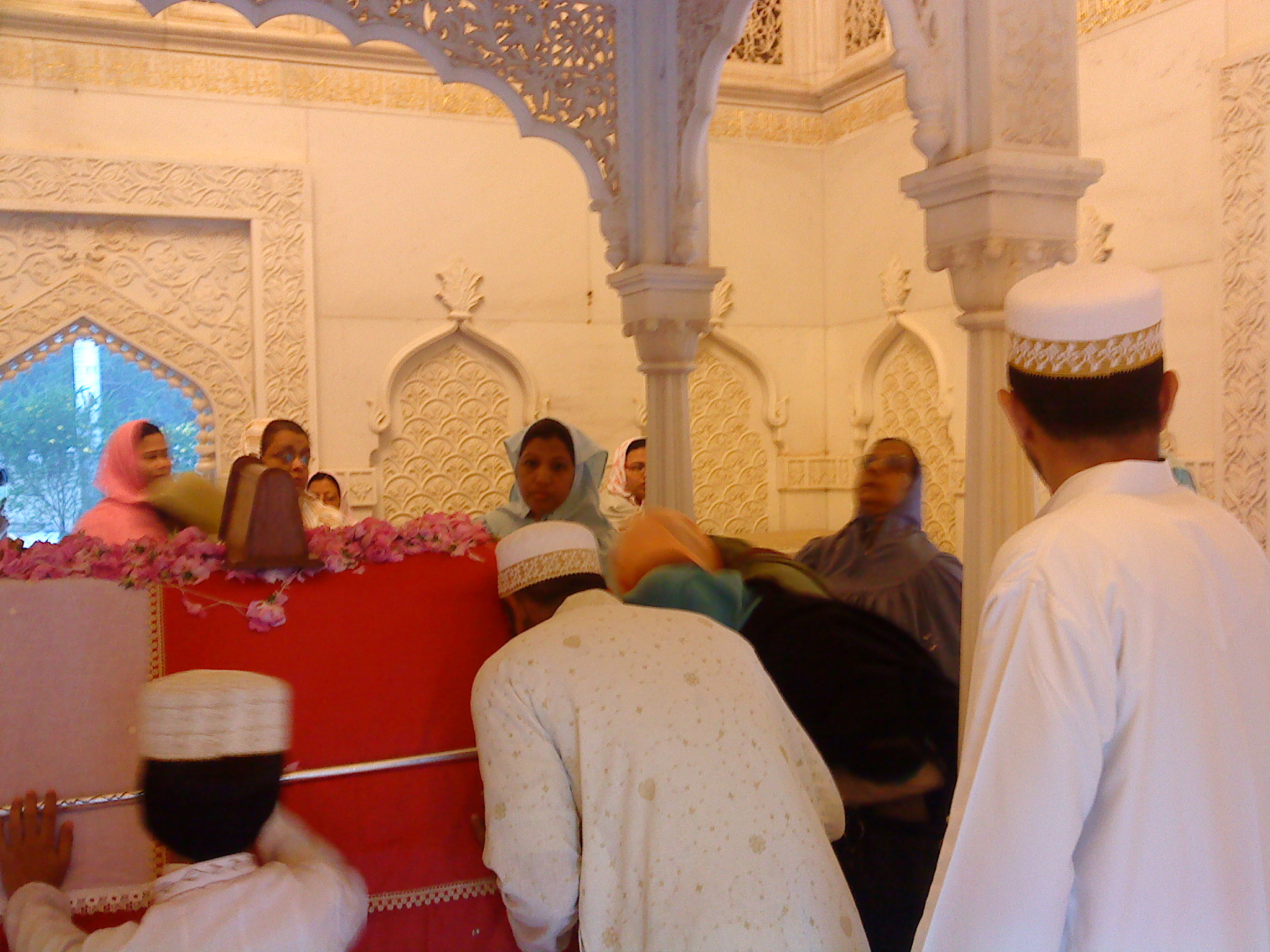
Grave Fakhruddin Shaheed

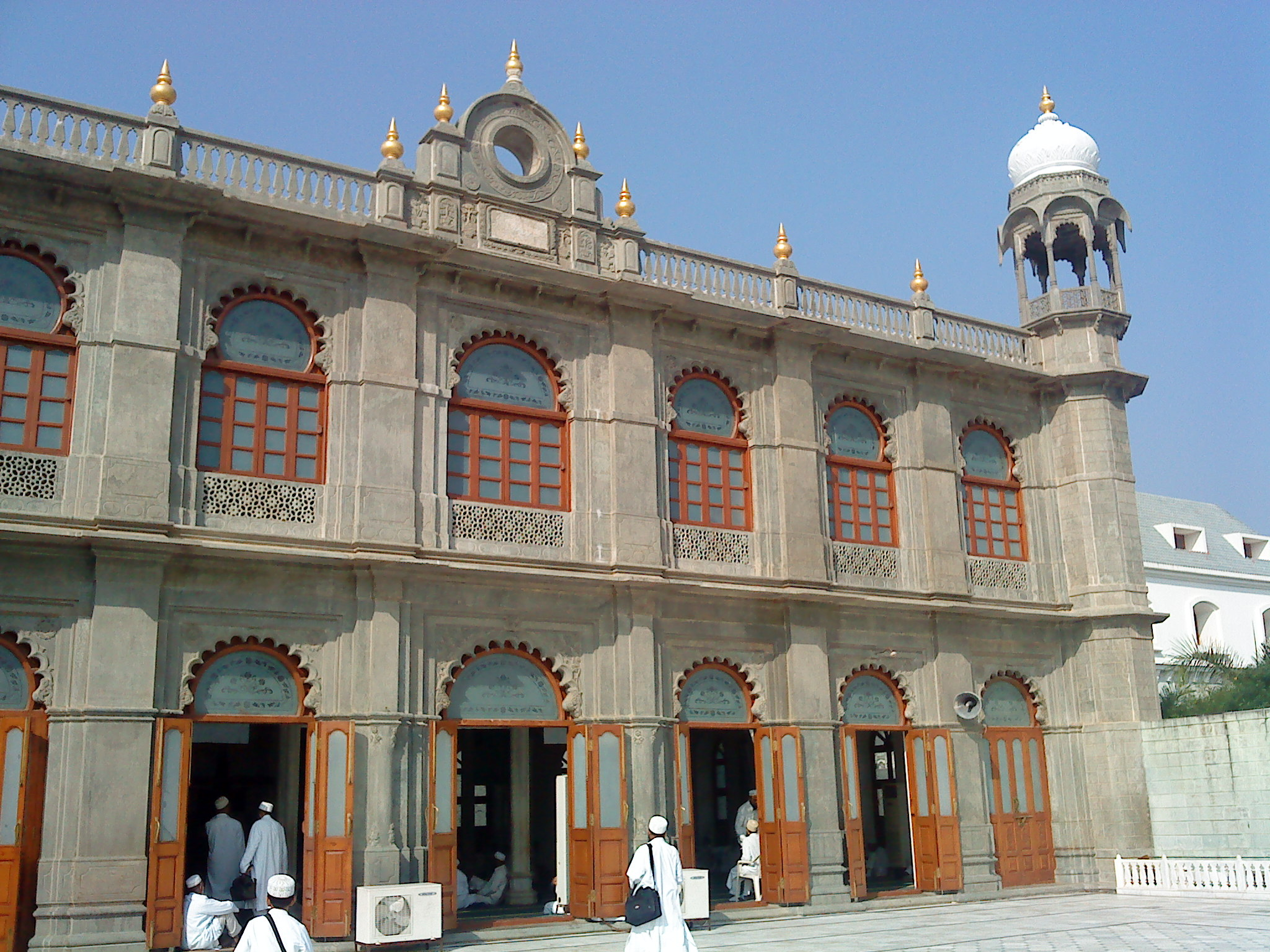
Mosque Fakhri Mazar

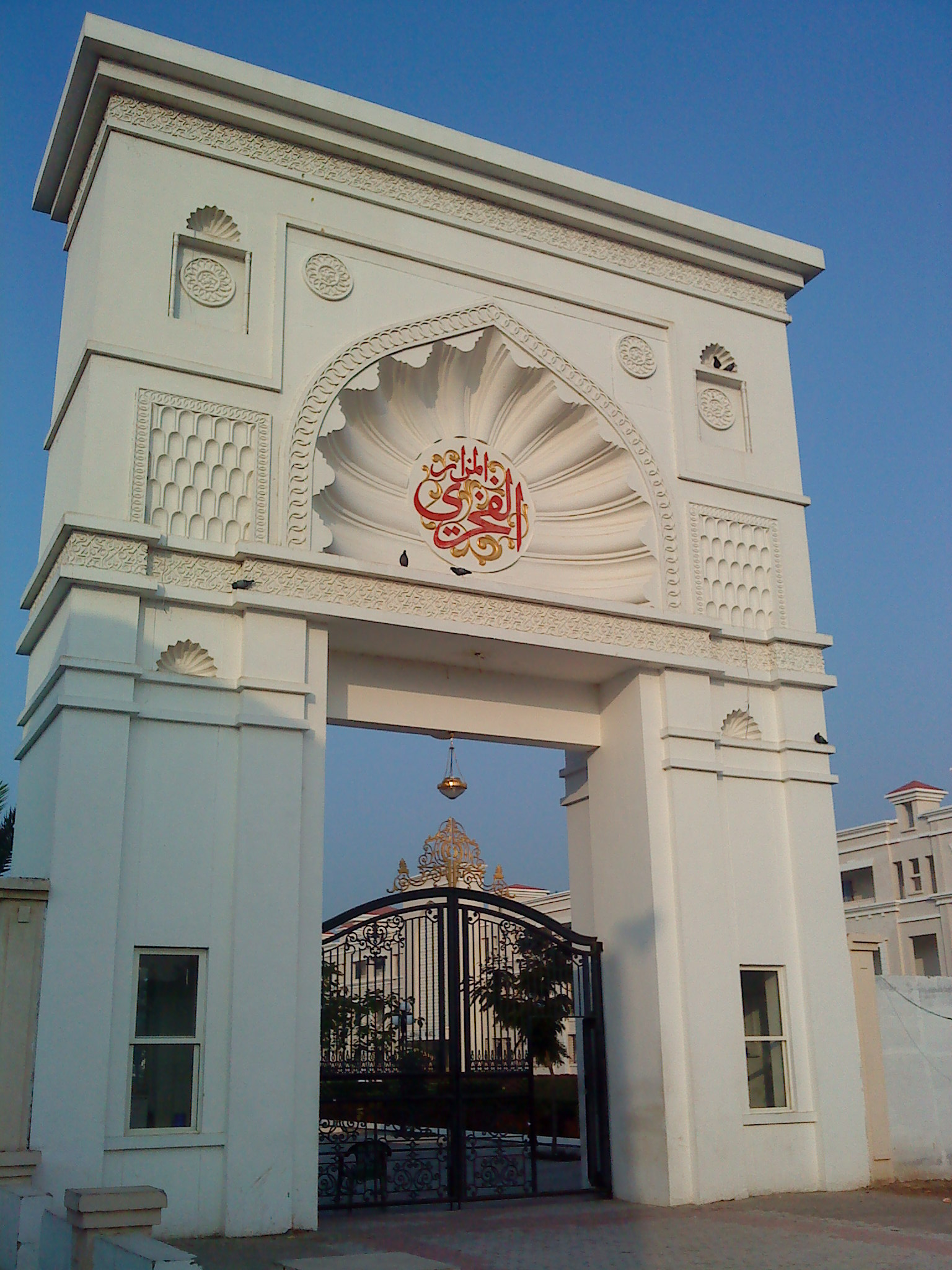
Main entrance, Fakhri mazar

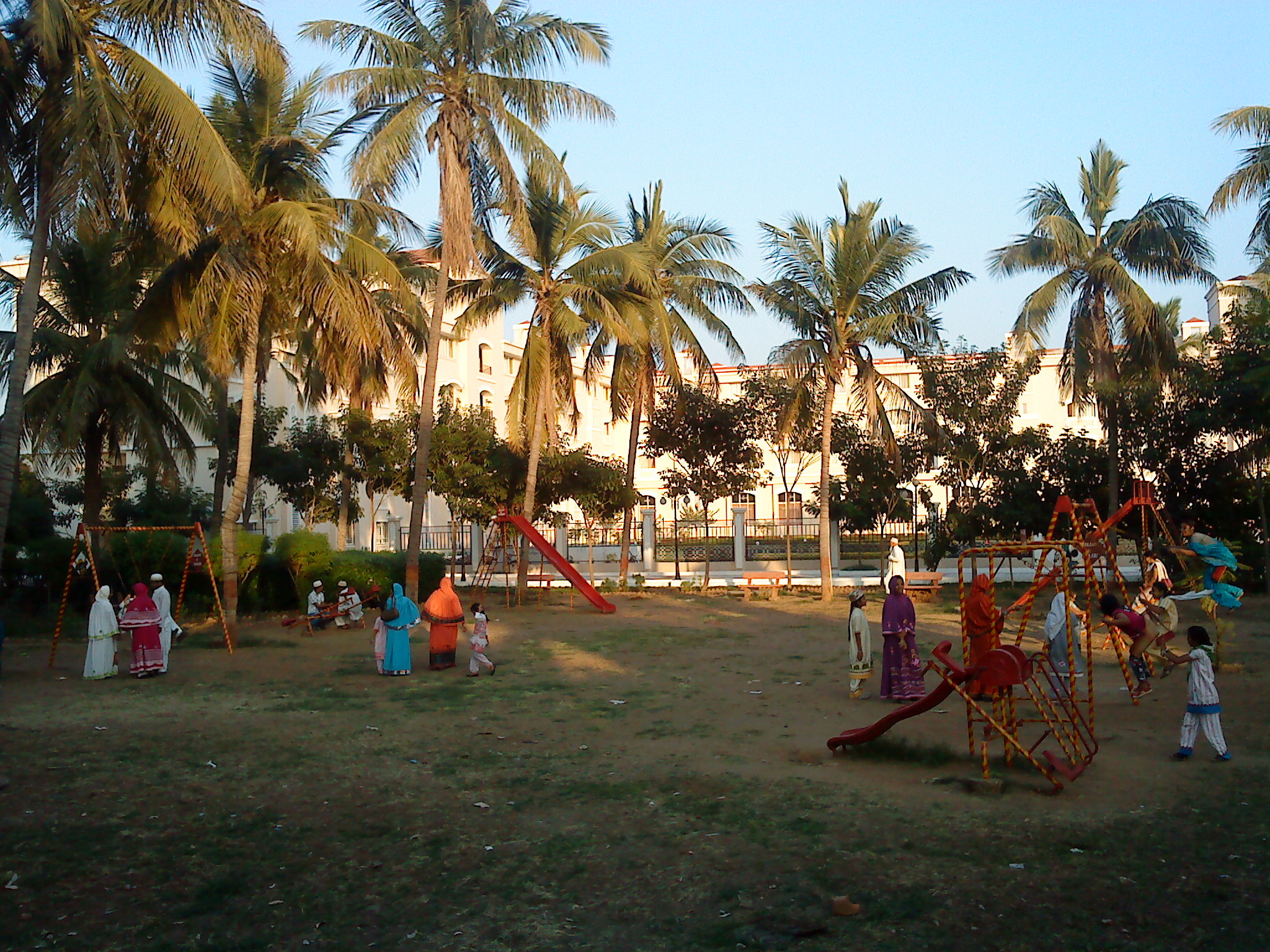
Garden for children, Fakhri mazar

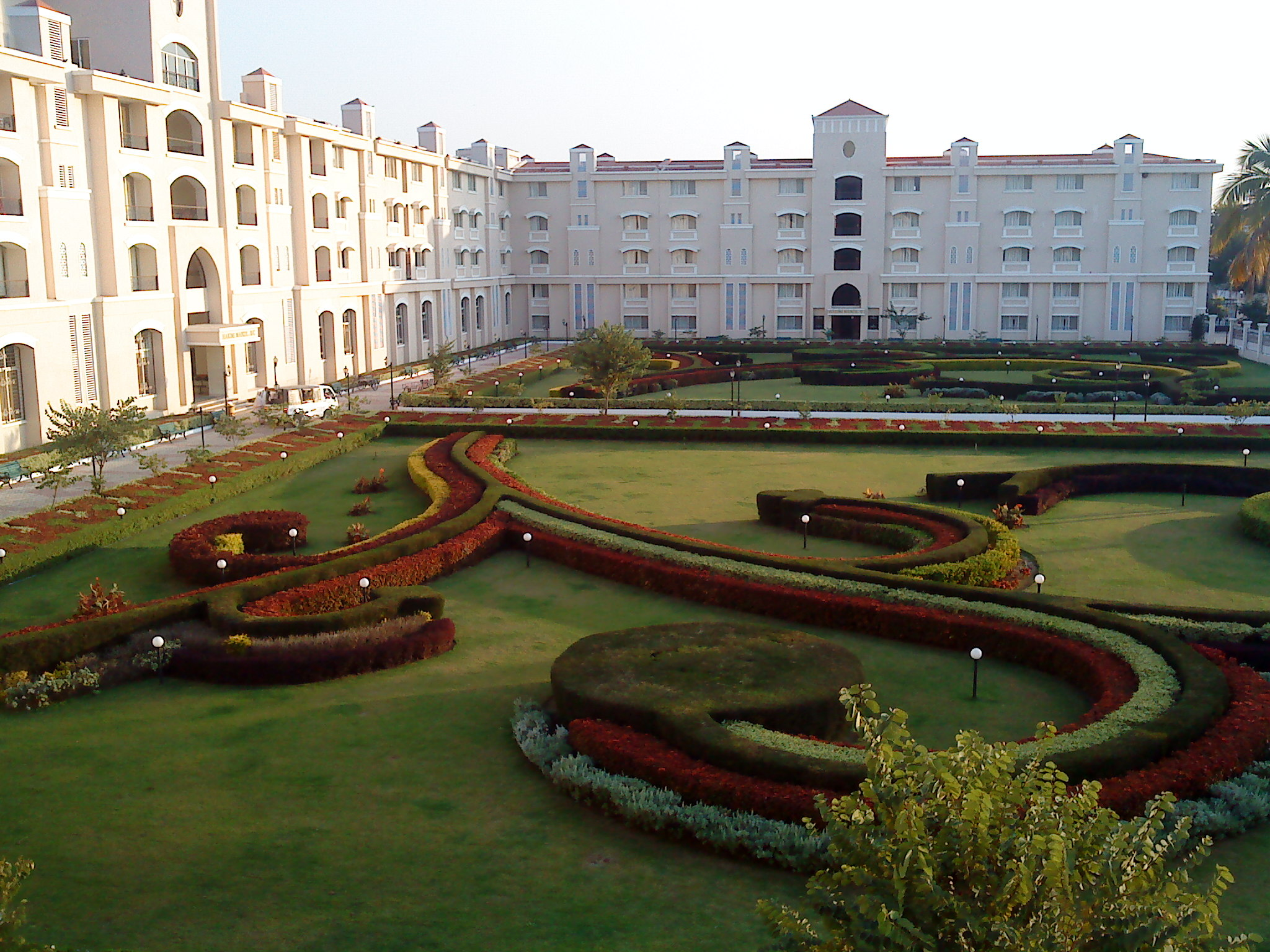
Residential complex for visitors Fakhri mazar

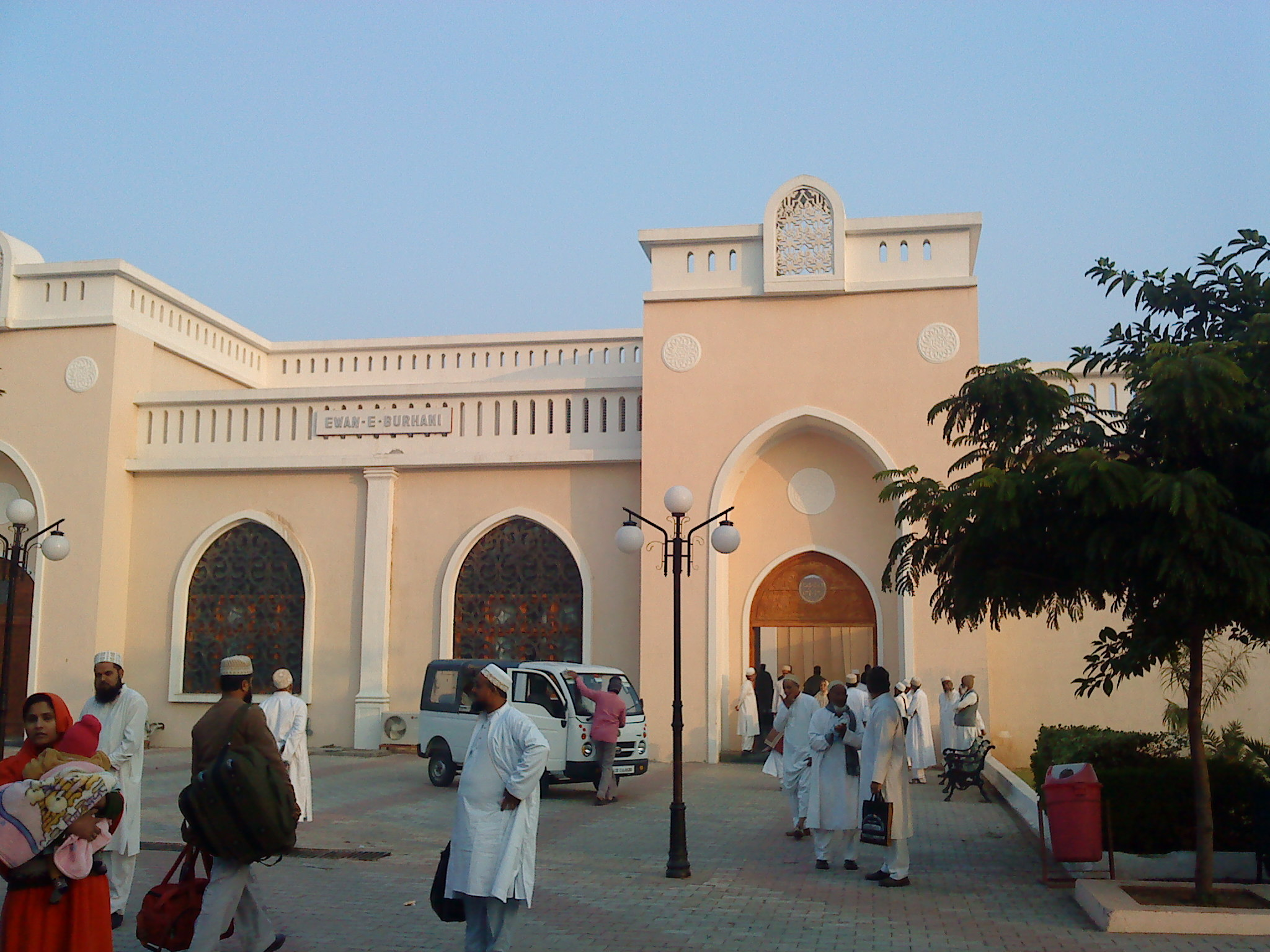
Dining hall, Fakhri Mazar

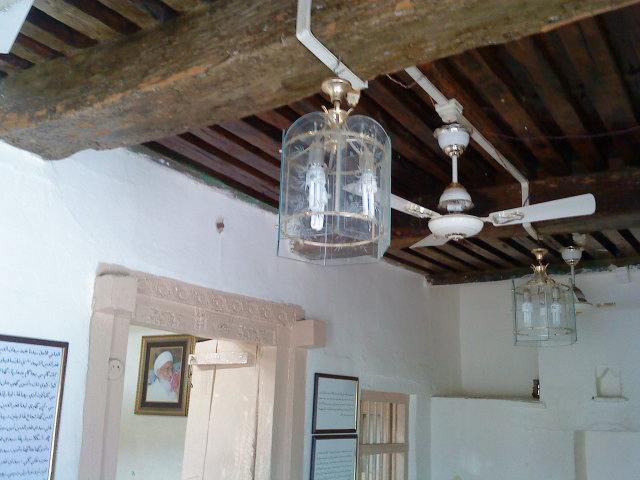
Residence Moulai Fakhruddin renovated

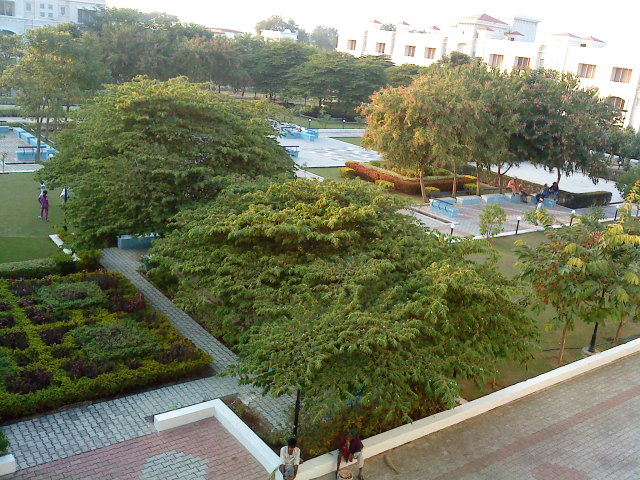
Gardens Fakhri Mazar

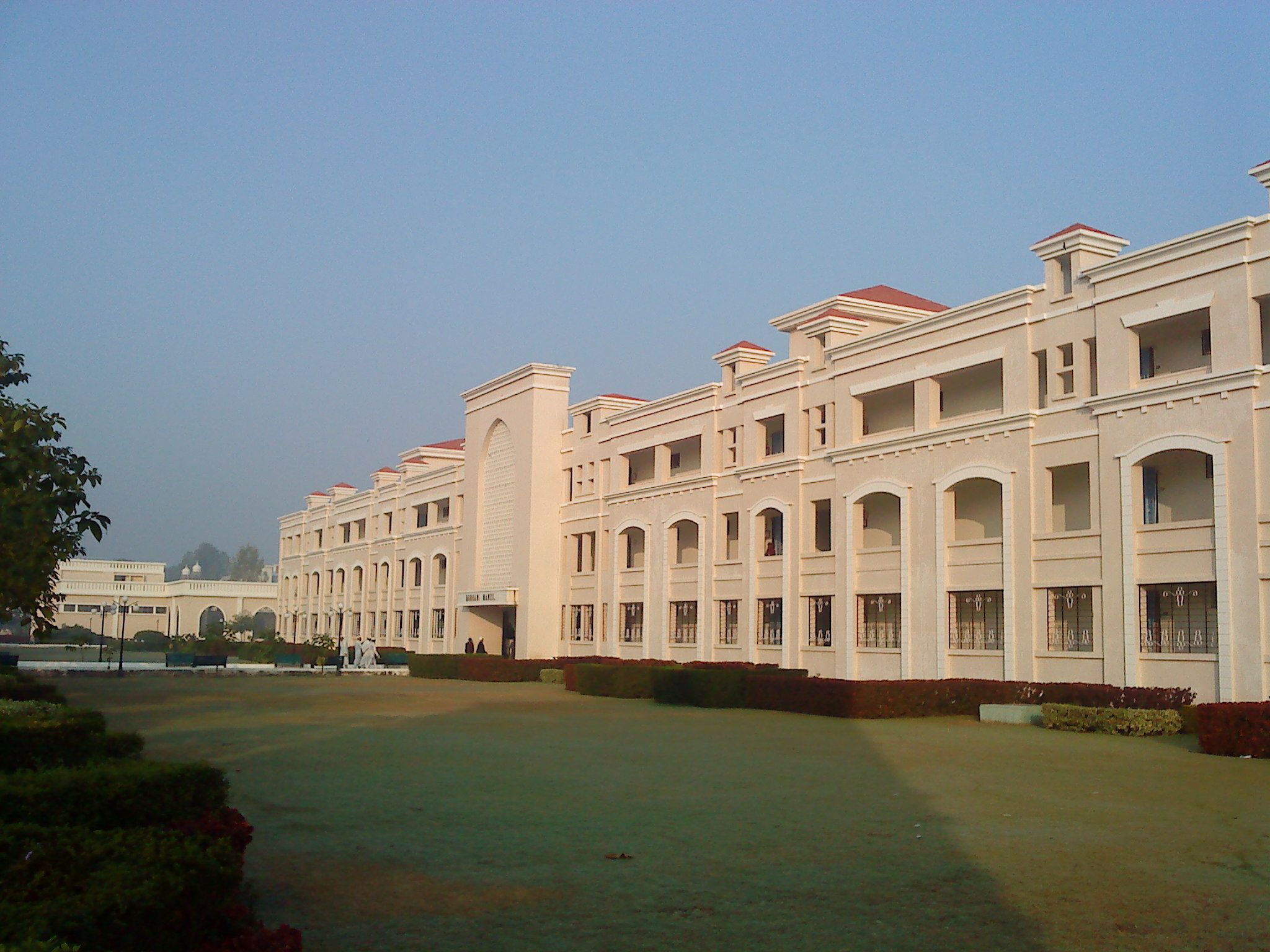
Residential complex 2

Family tree linking Dawoodi Bohra Dais with noted Duats
(Note:Black borders indicate 'Noted Duats' and red borders Dais.)

Moulayi Tarmal	Moulayi Bharmal
Syedi Fakhruddin	Moulayi Yaqoob
Syedi Dawood	Moulayi Ali
Syedi Hasan Feer
multiple generations
Moulayi Dawood
Syedi Shams Khan	Moulayi Raj
Moulai Hasanji Badshah	Bawa Mulla Khan	Syedi Lukman ji	Syedi Khanji Pheer	Ismail Badruddin I^{(34)}
Abdul Qadir Hakimuddin	Jeeva Bhai	Fatema Aai	Abduttayyeb Zakiuddin II^{(35)}
multiple generations
Moulai Faijullah Bhai	Syedna Ibrahim^{(39)}	Ali Bhai	Maryam Bai	Ismail Badruddin II^{(38)}
Amena Bai	Ahmedji	Abduttayyeb Zakiuddin III^{(41)}
multiple generations	multiple generations
Bouji Aai	Yusuf Najmuddin^{(42)}	Abde Ali Saifuddin^{(43)}
Mohammed Ezzuddin^{(44)}	Tayyeb Zainuddin^{(45)}	Maryam Aai	Mohammed Badruddin^{(46)}
Abdul Husain Husamuddin^{(48)}	{Abdul Qadir Najmuddin^{(47)}	Zainab Aai	Sakina Aai	Ratan Aai
Mohammed Burhanuddin^{(49)}
Abdullah Badruddin^{(50)}	Taher Saifuddin^{(51)}	Husaina Aai
Amatullah Aai	Mohammed Burhanuddin^{(52)}
Mufaddal Saifuddin^{(53)}

== See also ==
- Isma'ilism
- Mustaali
