= Abdul Qadir Hakimuddin =

Indian saint

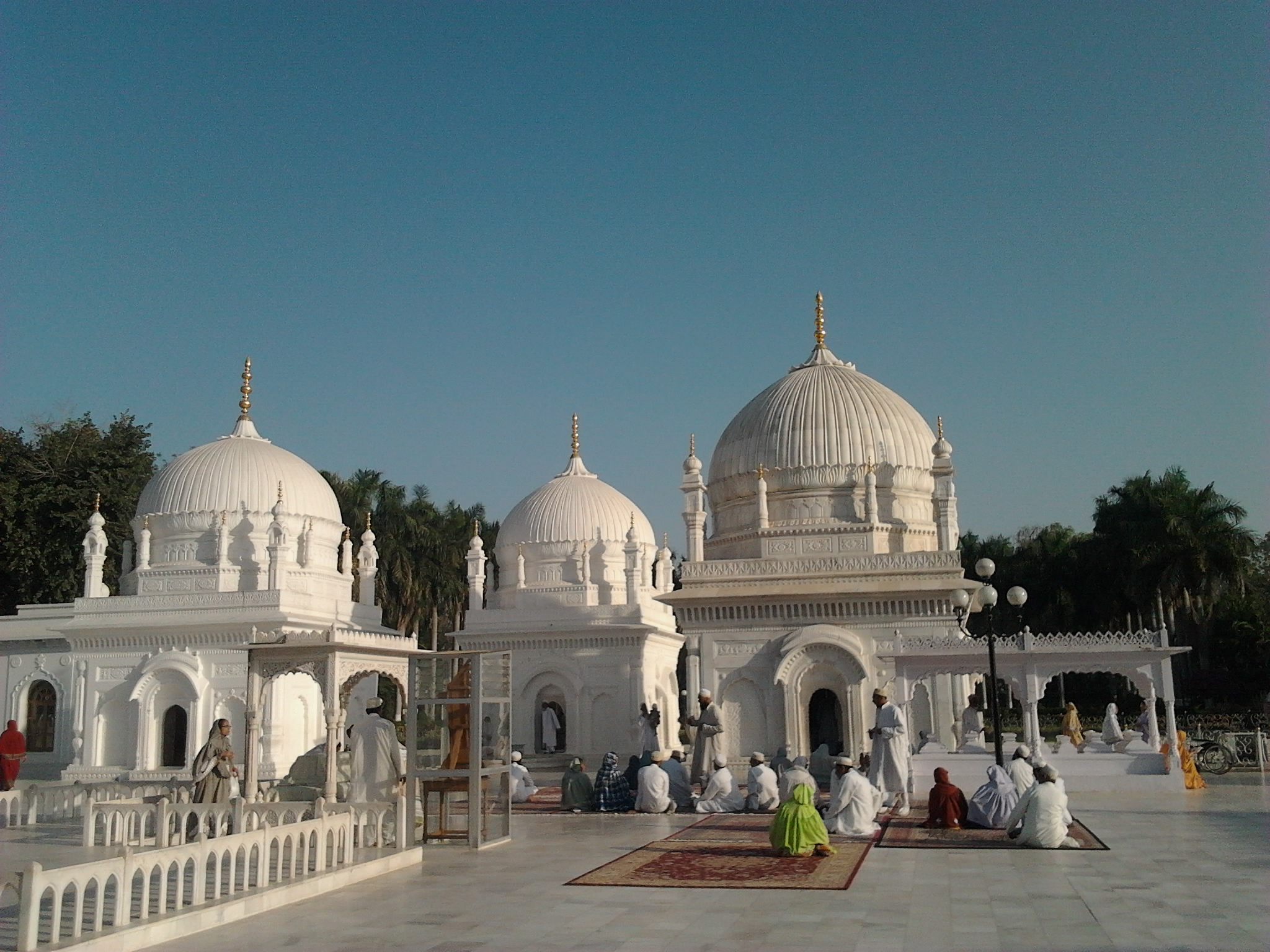
Dargah-e-Hakimi

Syedi Abdul Qadir Hakimuddin (1665-1730 AD) was a Dawoodi Bohra saint. He is buried in Burhanpur, India. His tomb complex 'Dargah-e-Hakimi' includes mosques, gardens, and visitor accommodations.

== Early life ==
He was born in the period of 34th Dai Syedna Badruddin Bin Mulla Raj on the 14th Jumada al-Awwal, 1077 AH, which corresponds to 11th November, 1666 AD.

His father Syedi Bava Mulla Khan visited the 35th Dai Syedna Abdul Taiyeb Zakiuddin in Ahmedabad and presented Syedi Abdul Qadir Hakimuddin in Khumus (one fifth of earnings to be presented in the name of god as Mulla Khan was having five sons) on the Dai's request.

== Title ==
He was presented the status of Haddiyat (sheikh) by 36th Dai Syedna Kalimuddin. He was made Mukasir Al Dawat by Syedna Noor Mohammed Nooruddin and elevated to Mazoon (2nd in command) Al Dawat by 38th Dai Syedna Ismail Badruddin. The 39th Dai Syedna Ibrahim Vajihuddin was the son of Syedi Abdulquadir Hakimuddin.

== Books ==
He some of the Books of Dawat including Bulohar and Buzazaf. He wrote in Urdu, Sanskrit, Persian and Arabic. He translated Sanskrit into Arabic in a book called Qalila Wadhima.

== Miracles ==
The 17th-century saint was known for his piety, humility and erudition. He came to Burhanpur as his way of preaching Islam. He could recite the entire Quran from memory in childhood. Legend has it that one day while travelling through a forest, he was reciting the Quran when a tiger walked by. The animal sat before the scholar, and quietly walked away once the recitation was over. When Syedi Hakimudin died in 5th Shawwal, 1142 AH, which refers to 23rd April, 1730 AD, his enemies exhumed his body after 22 days, but were shocked to find a fresh and fragrant body. Over the years, people's faith grew in his miraculous powers.

The word hakim denotes a healer and thousands of Bohras flock to his shrine, taking a mannat (vow) for shifa (cure) from disease and seeking health for both the body and the soul. It is said that whoever comes there with a prayer on her/his lips, does not go away disappointed. Those who have their prayers answered, their sick loved ones cured, their sinking businesses nursed back to health, and their other problems solved, come back with a generous offering.

Thousands of pilgrims are served non-vegetarian food, complete with dessert, tender mutton and basmati rice, and fruit.

== Lineage ==
Abdul Qadir Hakimuddin is the ancestor of nine Dawoodi Bohra Dais: Syedna Mohammed Ezzuddin, Syedna Tayyeb Zainuddin, Syedna Abdul Qadir Najmuddin, Syedna Abdul Husain Husamuddin, Syedna Mohammed Burhanuddin I, Syedna Abdullah Badruddin, Syedna Taher Saifuddin, Syedna Mohammed Burhanuddin, and Syedna Mufaddal Saifuddin. The tree shown below illustrate the clear link.

== Photo gallery ==
Dargah-e-Hakimi

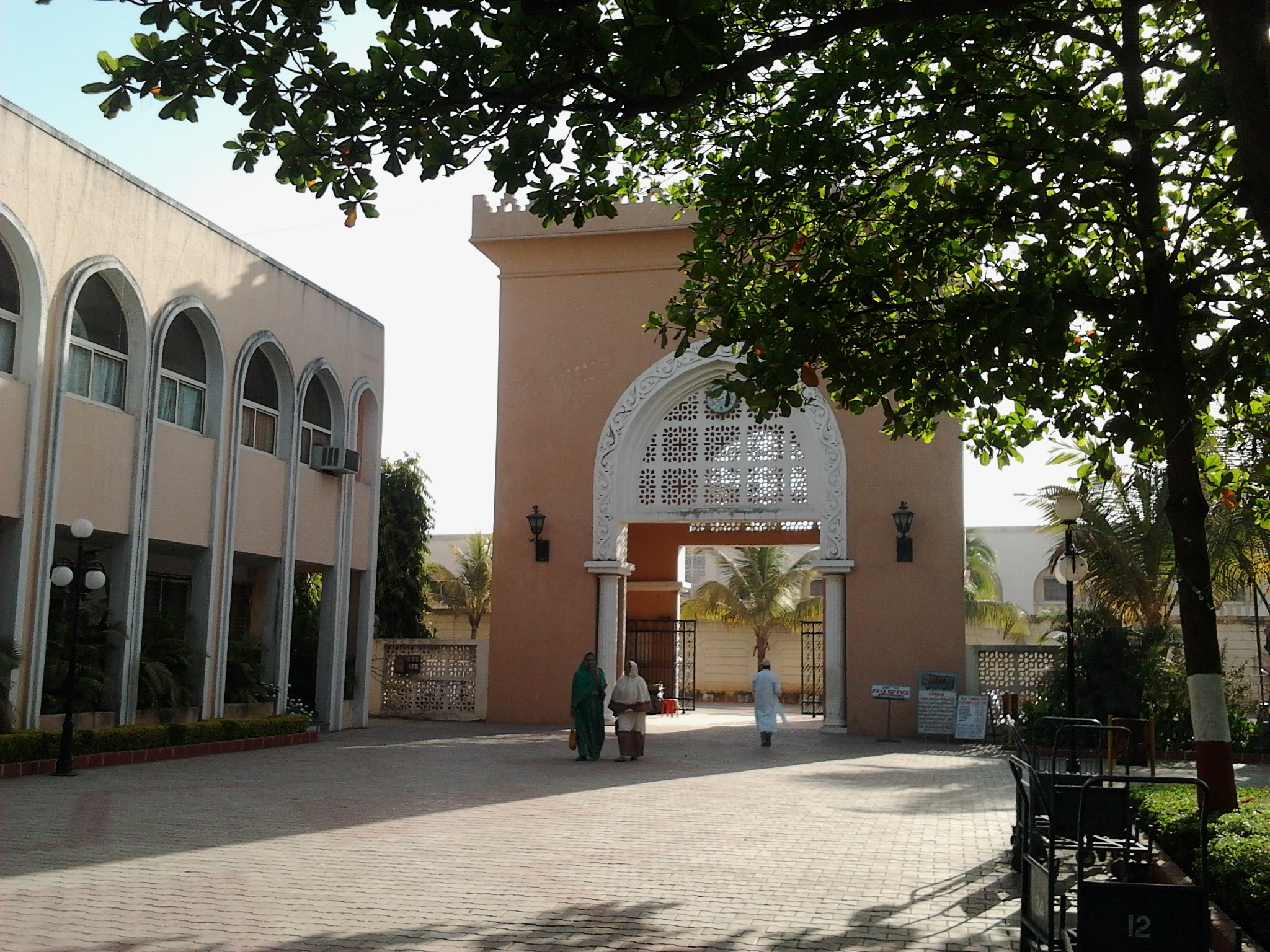
Main entrance Dargah-e-Hakimi

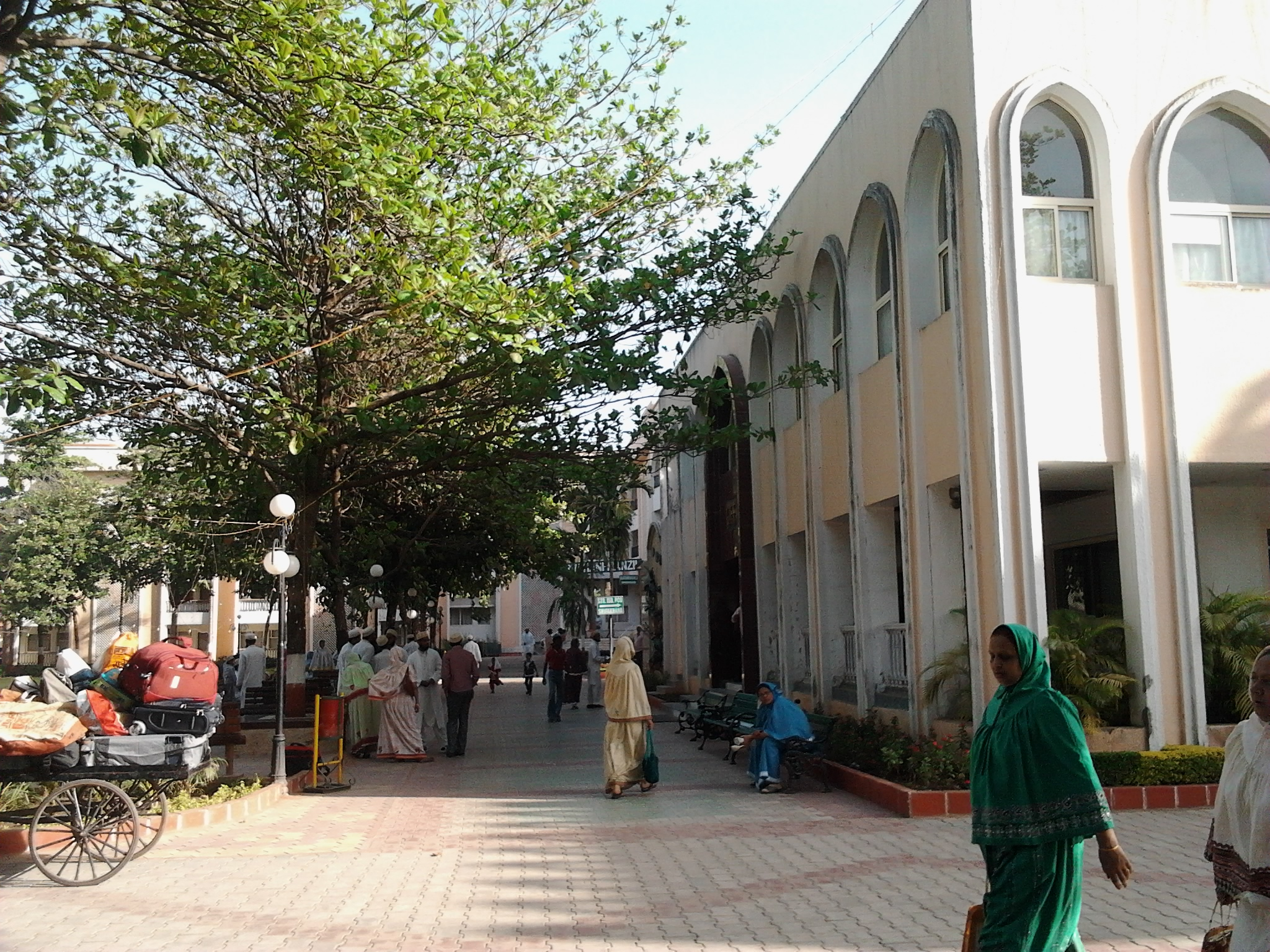
Reception Dargah-e-Hakimi

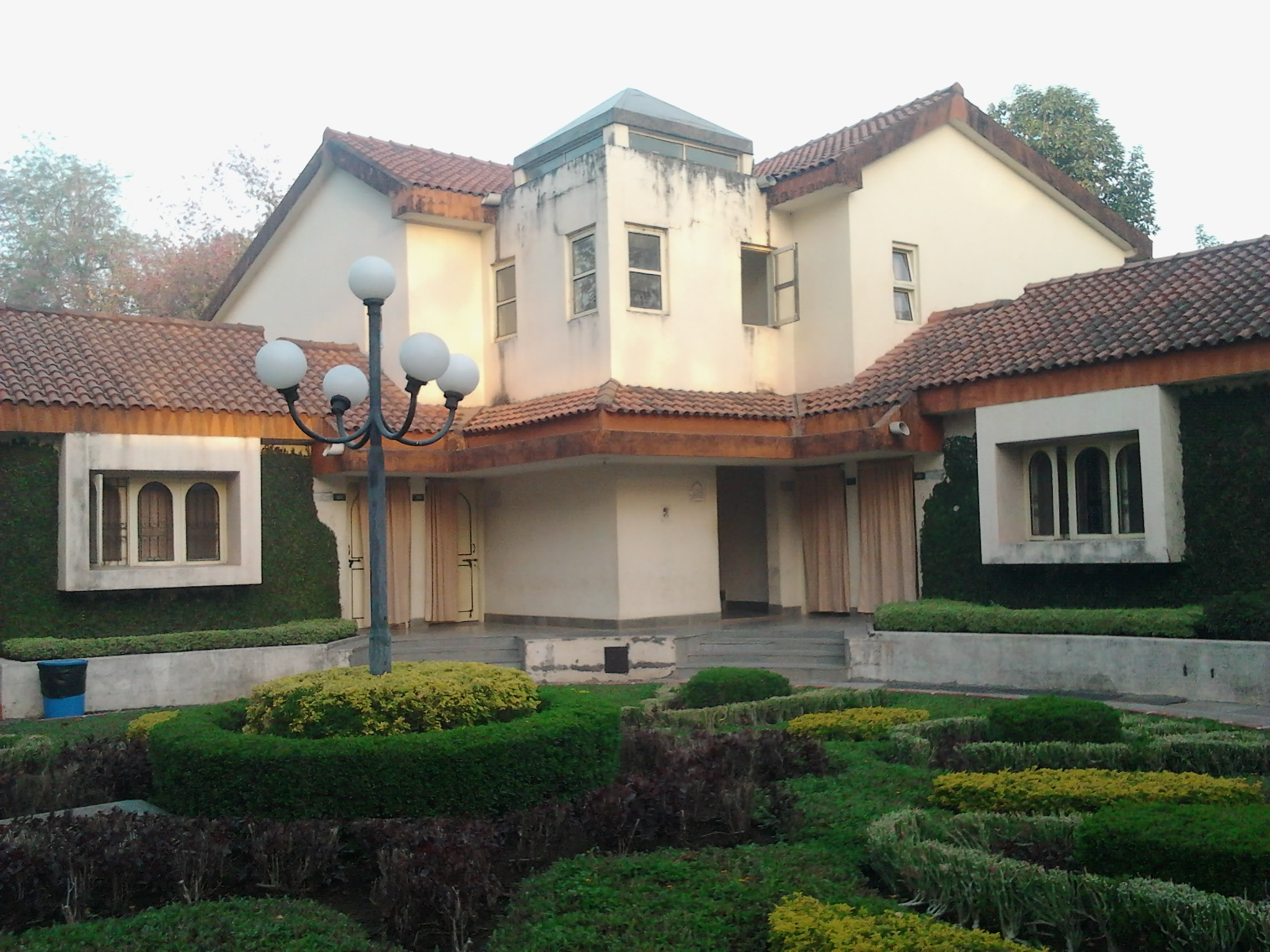
Residential bungalow type accommodation for visitors at Dargah-e-Hakimi

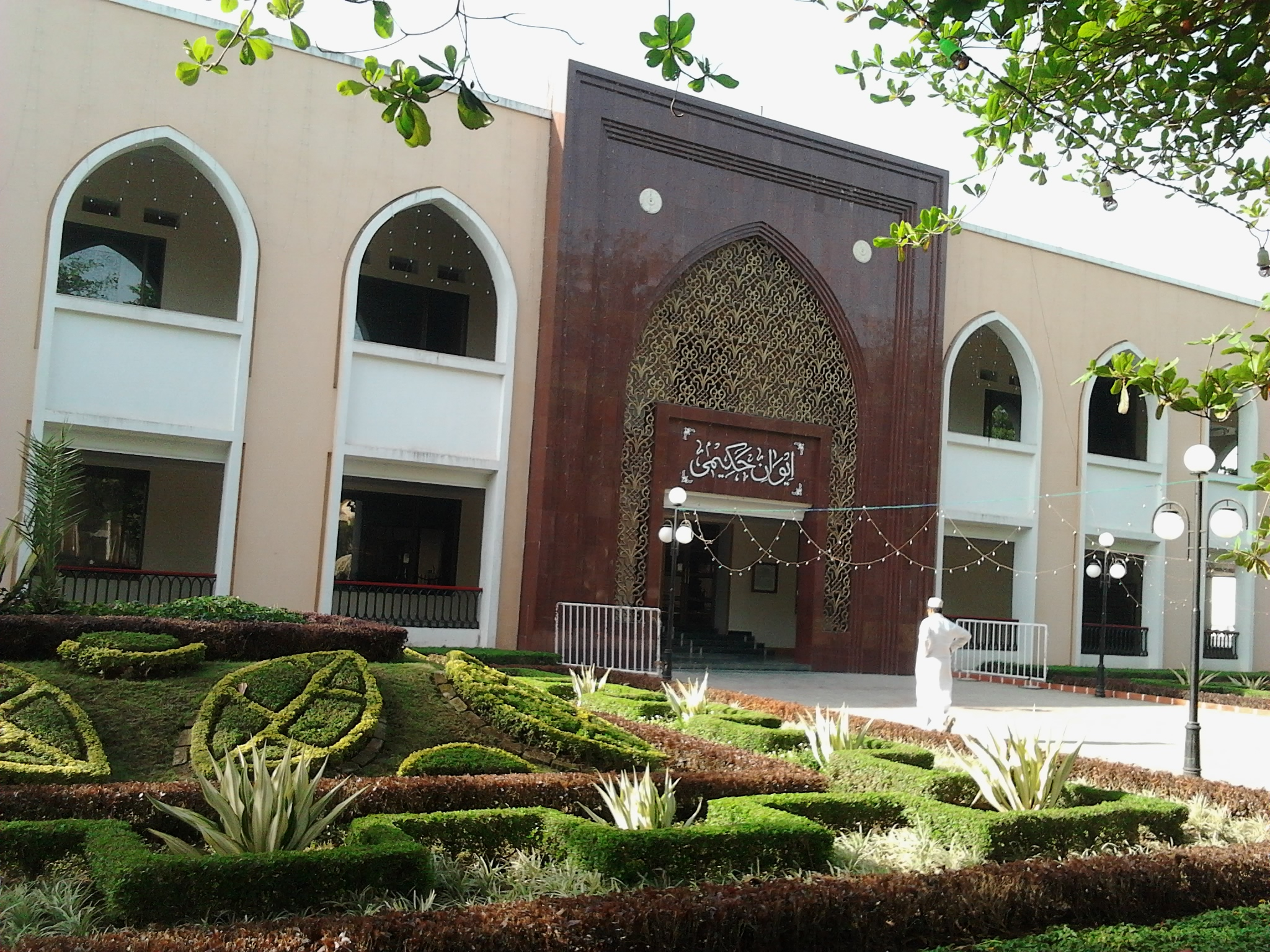
Dining hall or Faiz at Dargah-e-Hakimi

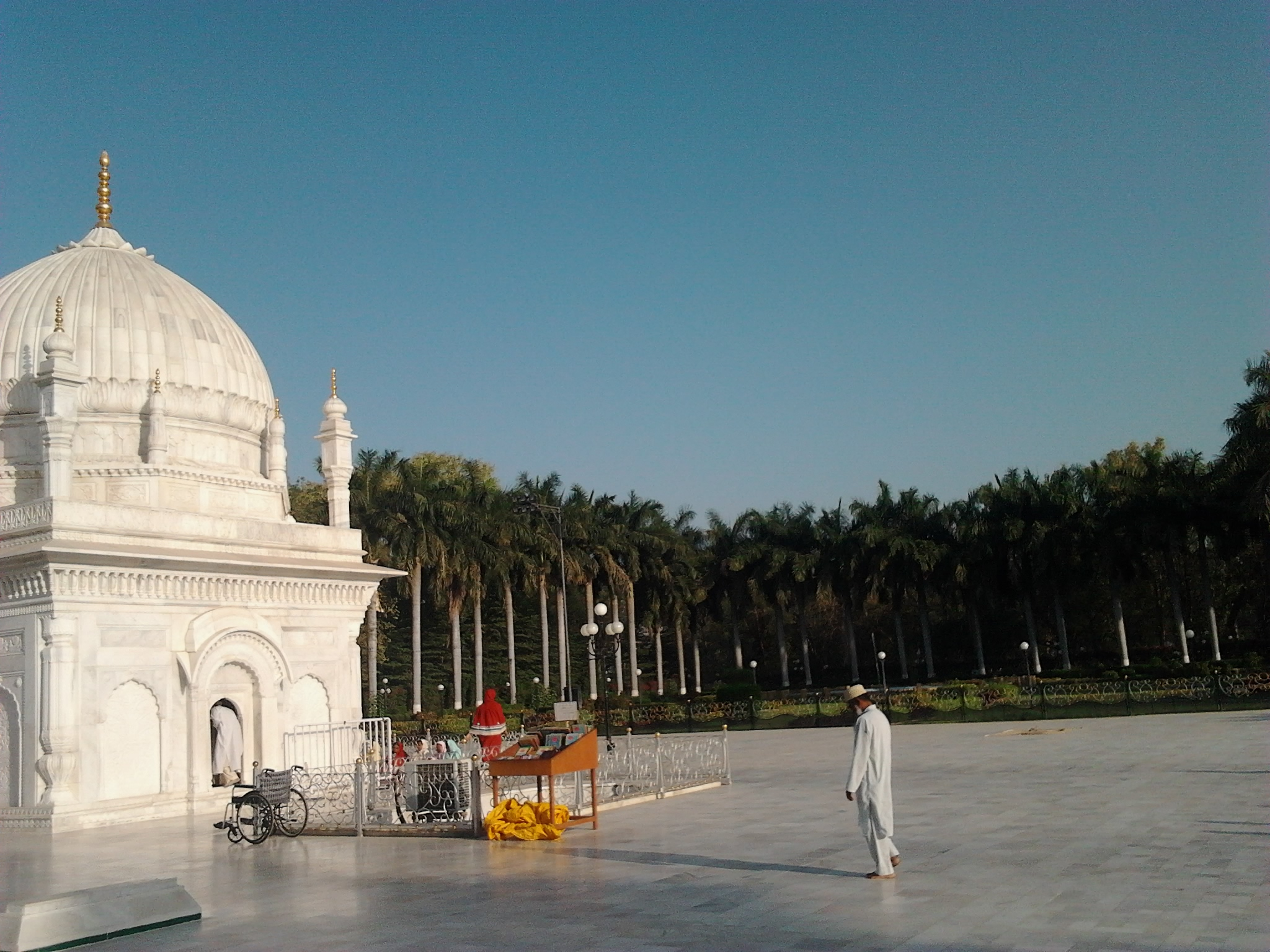
Sehan (marble patio) Dargah-e-Hakimi
