= Abdullah Badruddin =

Indian religious leader (1846–1915)

Syedna Abdullah Badruddin 50th Da'i al-Mutlaq of the Dawoodi Bohra
- عبدُ الله بَدرُالدّين

Da'i al-Mutlaq
- In office 1906–1915
- Preceded by: Mohammed Burhanuddin I
- Succeeded by: Taher Saifuddin
- Title: Syedna; Maulana; Da'i al-Mutlaq; Da'i al-Fatemi

Personal life
- Born: 11 July 1846 Surat
- Died: 25 January 1915 (aged 68) Surat, India
- Resting place: Surat, India
- Parent: Abdul Husain Husamuddin (father)

Religious life
- Religion: Islam
- Sect: Isma'ili; Dawoodi Bohra
- Jurisprudence: Mustaali; Tayyabi

Syedna Abdullah Badruddin bin Syedna AbdulHusain Husamuddin (Arabic: عبدُالله بَدرُالدين); born 11 July 1846) was an Indian-born religious leader, and the 50th Da'i al-Mutlaq of the Dawoodi Bohra sect. He was the son of Syedna AbdulHusain Husamuddin, whose family lineage can be traced back to Syedi Fakhruddin Shaheed. When the 49th Da'i al-Mutlaq Syedna Mohammed Burhanuddin did nass upon him, all those people who used to say, "After Syedna Mohammed Burhanuddin, the sect would come to an end", could not believe their eyes.

By virtue of being the son of Syedna AbdulHusain Husamuddin he became very closely associated with his uncle the 47th Da'i al-Mutlaq, Syedna AbdulQadir Najmuddin. He was educated by his father in all fields of knowledge and he remained at the service of his uncle, for the active part of his childhood and youth until age 39, helping him and also learning from him. Then he served his father for six years when his father became the 48th Da'i al-Mutlaq. Later he also served the 49th Da'i al-Mutlaq Syedna Mohammed Burhanuddin for fifteen years with dedication and responsibility.

He was awarded with the greatest honor of becoming the 50th Da'i al-Mutlaq of the Dawoodi Bohra sect. In 1915 he conferred nass upon Syedna Taher Saifuddin and died later in the year.

== Early life ==
Syedna Badruddin was the son of Syedna AbdulHusain Husamuddin. He was born in Surat, a city in the Indian state of Gujarat. His brothers were Syedi Abdeali Moyyuddin and Sheikh Adam Zainuddin. As a member of a Da'i al-Mutlaq family, he was raised within Dawoodi Bohra religious and cultural traditions. He was educated by his father, who recognized his interest in learning. He memorized the ''Da'a'im al-Islam'' (Pillars of Islam), a text outlining the rules for performing the tenets of Islam, and was able to cite references from it accurately.

Syedna AbdulQadir Najmuddin and his father also instructed him and his brother, Syedi Abdeali Moiyuddin, in the religious knowledge they had acquired from Syedi Abdeali Imaduddin, and both brothers later imparted the same to the 51st Da'i al-Mutlaq Syedna Taher Saifuddin. The religious knowledge transmitted by the 43rd Da'i al-Mutlaq, Syedna Abde'Ali Saifuddin, was preserved and passed down over a period of roughly a hundred years to Syedna Badruddin.

During the era of Syedna AbdulQadir Najmuddin, a 'Hadd-e-Fadil' (a high-ranking learned person) of the Dawoodi Bohra sect had predicted the glorious future of Abdullah Badruddin.

Abdul Qadir Najmuddin paid special attention to all aspects of his and his brother Syedi Abdeali Moyyuddin's upbringing and education. Syedi Abdeali Moyyuddin had also written much prose and poetry.

Throughout his youth, he spent most of his time in several ways: assisting the Da'i al-Mutlaq with religious tasks while learning from him, studying the finer points of becoming a Da'i al-Mutlaq under his father, engaging in activities for the betterment of the community, or immersing himself in books of knowledge.

== Life before Da'i al-Mutlaq ==
Abdullah Badruddin was born during the era of the 47th Da'i al-Mutlaq and his uncle, Abdul Qadir Najmuddin. During this period, opponents of the Dawoodi Bohra community alleged that nas had not been conferred on Abdul Qadir Najmuddin by the 46th Da'i al-Mutlaq, Mohammed Badruddin. This caused confusion among members of the community. In response, his uncle reportedly said only that the fifth Da'i al-Mutlaq after him would answer these claims. His uncle travelled extensively among Dawoodi Bohra communities to teach them, and permitted learned members of the community to instruct others on the matter. Abdullah Badruddin and other learned members supported his uncle in this effort. Together, they were credited with bringing back members who had left over these claims and reinforcing the faith of those who had remained. These activities placed a significant financial strain on the Dawoodi Bohra community, increasing its debts.

When his father became the 48th Da'i al-Mutlaq, he also inherited the community's existing debts.

His cousin, Mohammed Burhanuddin, then became the 49th Da'i al-Mutlaq and devised a plan to pay off the community's debts. He established a fund called the 'Dawoodi Fund' to collect money for this purpose. Abdullah Badruddin took on this task, reportedly leaving early each morning to hire a carriage and visit shops to collect funds, continuing the work through midday and eating alone after returning home. One of his uncles is said to have remarked that "the one whom he is serving day and night doesn't even wait for him [to have food together]," referring to his cousin.

When his cousin later conferred nas upon him and he became the 50th Da'i al-Mutlaq, the same uncle acknowledged that his service had been reciprocated.

He served under three Da'i al-Mutlaq before becoming the 50th Da'i al-Mutlaq himself.

== Life as Da'i al-Mutlaq ==
He became the 50th Da'i al-Mutlaq through the nas conferred by the 49th Da'i al-Mutlaq, Mohammed Burhanuddin, in Surat in 1906.

In 1907, he delivered his first waaz (sermon) on the day of Ashura (the tenth day of Moharam ul Haram, the first month of the Hijri calendar).

During his extensive travels, he laid the foundations of many masjids (places of worship). Some were completed and inaugurated by him during his tenure as Da'i al-Mutlaq, while the rest were completed during the tenure of the 51st Da'i al-Mutlaq, Taher Saifuddin. He also reconstructed the Daras us Saifee (now known as Al Jamea tus Saifiyah, Surat), adding several new structures.

During his travels, he encouraged members of the Dawoodi Bohra community to devote time to reading and studying its religious texts. He was known for strict adherence to the tenets of Islam and oversaw efforts to have community members follow them.

He conferred nas upon his nephew, Taher Saifuddin, in 1915 in Dumas, Surat. When his nephew came to seek his blessing the next day, he was informed of the nas and was reportedly moved to tears. He is said to have then placed a hand on his nephew's shoulder and said, "Brother, I know that the dark clouds of a conspiracy are already looming above and you are all alone. But don't keep any kind of doubt in your mind. You have the complete support of the Imam in seclusion. And I hope that the Imam in seclusion reveals himself through your hands."

He died on 25 January 1915 (10 Rabiul Awwal 1333H).

== Achievements ==
During the era of his uncle, the 47th Da'i al-Mutlaq Abdul Qadir Najmuddin, opponents alleged that the 46th Da'i al-Mutlaq, Mohammed Badruddin, had not conferred nas upon his uncle. His uncle reportedly remained silent on the matter before stating that the fifth Da'i al-Mutlaq after him would answer these claims. With the help of Abdullah Badruddin and other learned members of the community, his uncle travelled extensively to teach community members about the nas. Abdullah Badruddin is credited with bringing back members of the community who had left over these claims, and with reinforcing the belief of those who had remained.

When his father, Abdul Husain Husamuddin, became the 48th Da'i al-Mutlaq, the Dawoodi Bohra community faced financial debt. During this period, he assisted his father with responsibilities aimed at addressing the community's financial situation.

He continued this role of service under his cousin, the 49th Da'i al-Mutlaq Mohammed Burhanuddin. When his cousin established the Dawoodi Fund to pay off the community's debts, he again took responsibility for collecting funds, encouraging community members to contribute. The community's debts were paid off within approximately five years.

He also helped his cousin establish an organizational structure intended to improve the functioning of the community's various offices. This involved studying how departments functioned, aligning them to work together, and resolving issues that arose. The responsibilities of each office holder were then defined and communicated. Within five years, the departments were reported to be functioning as a coordinated structure.

His cousin subsequently introduced a plan intended to support the economic development of Dawoodi Bohra community members, which Abdullah Badruddin also took part in implementing. He and his cousin are described as having helped guide community members from low-income occupations toward more substantial sources of income. Within about five years, the community's finances are described as having improved significantly from its earlier indebted state.

He became the 50th Da'i al-Mutlaq during this period and continued this development work during his own tenure.

He completed several masjids and other structures begun under his cousin, and laid the foundations for additional masjids during his own time as Da'i al-Mutlaq. He also reconstructed the Daras us Saifiyah (now known as Al Jamea tus Saifiyah).

Shia Islam titles
Abdullah Badruddin Dā'ī al-Mutlaq Born: 11 July 1846 Died: 25 January 1915
Preceded by Mohammed Burhanuddin I	50th Da'i al-Mutlaq; 1906-1915	Succeeded by Taher Saifuddin
