= Mohammed Burhanuddin I =

49th Dai al-Mutlaq of the Dawoodi Bohra

Syedna Syedna Mohammed Burhanuddin 49th Da'i al-Mutlaq of the Dawoodi Bohra
- مُحَمّد بُرهانُ الدّين
- A painting portrait of Mohammed Burhanuddin

Da'i al-Mutlaq
- In office 1891–1906
- Preceded by: Abdul Husain Husamuddin
- Succeeded by: Abdullah Badruddin

Personal life
- Born: 18 November 1840; Surat
- Died: 21 February 1906 (aged 65); Surat
- Resting place: Mazaar-e Saifee, Surat
- Spouse: Amatullah Aaisaheba
- Children: Taher Saifuddin
- Parent: Abdul Qadir Najmuddin (father)
- Other names: Mohta Bawaji Saheb

Religious life
- Religion: Shi'a Islam

Mohammed Burhanuddin (Arabic: محمد برھان الدین; 18 November 1840 in Surat, India – 21 February 1906), was 49th Da'i al-Mutlaq of the Dawoodi Bohra sect. He was the son of the 47th Da'i al-Mutlaq Abdul Qadir Najmuddin, who belongs to the family lineage of Fakhruddin Shaheed. After the death of the 48th Da'i al-Mutlaq Abdul Husain Husamuddin the helm of the Dawoodi Bohra sect came into his hands. He led the community out of a period of indebtedness, disorganization and lack of development within the sect.

Being the son of the 47th Da'i al-Mutlaq he had always been closely associated with the members of the Dawoodi Bohra sect. For the whole part of his childhood and adolescence until age 40, he served his father. He was educated by his father in all aspects of religion and the world.

He married Aaisaheba Amatulla Aaisaheba and settled in Surat.

After the death of his father, he served Abdul Husain Husamuddin with the same respect and dedication that he had for his father.

After he became the 49th Da'i al-Mutlaq he devised a time bound plan to bring about a total turnaround in the prospects of the members of the Dawoodi Bohra community. In the first five years he concentrated on paying off the debts of the community. In this effort Abdullah Badruddin lent complete support which resulted in all the debts getting paid off in five years. The next five years he devoted to restructuring the organisational setup and rearranging the work procedures of the community. The following five years after that, he worked towards development and growth of the members of the community in particular and the sect as a whole.

He remained as the Da'i al-Mutlaq until 1906. He appointed, or did nass, upon his nephew Abdullah Badruddin as his successor and died chanting "Ya Ali, Ya Ali" continuously in his last moments.

== Early life ==
Mohammed Burhanuddin was born to Abdul Qadir Najmuddin in Surat, a city in the state of Gujarat, India, where his father stayed. He spend his childhood being raised in the family of Da'i al-Mutlaq and educated by his father. His father was a very brave and intelligent leader who steered the community through testing times, when the enemies of the Dawoodi Bohra community hatched a conspiracy among the members of the community stating that nas (the process of appointing a successor) has not been done over his father by the 46th Da'i al-Mutlaq Mohammed Badruddin. This created great chaos and confusion within the community. His father remained quiet and did not answer his enemies but concentrated on imparting education to the members of the Dawoodi Bohra such that they remain unaffected by those rumors. When asked the reason of not answering the enemies his father said that the fifth Da'i al-Mutlaq from him will answer his enemies.

He married Aaisaheba Amatulla Aaisaheba and settled in Surat. His son Taher Saifuddin, was said by Abdul Qadir Najmuddin to be the one who would answer his enemies.

He had nearly 30 children, most of them died during infancy. Following this, Taher Saifuddin and his brother, Tayyib bhaisaheb Zainuddin, were born.

He spend most of his time being with his father and helping his father in performing the religious duties. This was also a time for learning the intricacies of the beliefs, customs and traditions of the Dawoodi Bohra sect from his father.

While he was with his father, Aaisaheba Amatulla Aaisaheba always took great care of his children. But just eight years after the birth of Taher Saifuddin, Aaisaheba Amatulla Aaisaheba died, which was a great loss for him.

== Life Before Da'i al-Mutlaq ==
Mohammed Burhanuddin was born in the same year his father became 47th Da'i al-Mutlaq of the Dawoodi Bohra community. He served his father and also served his uncle the 48th Da'i al-Mutlaq Abdul Husain Husamuddin. So Mohammed Burhanuddin had the honor of serving two Da'i al-Mutlaq.

At the age of 15 Mohammed Burhanuddin was conferred Hadiyat (a title for learned) and the laqab (name to be used after the first name) of Burhanuddin by his father. His father also prepared Mohammed Burhanuddin to take up the responsibilities of a Da'i al-Mutlaq and appointed him as the raas ul hudood (a position of esteem in Dawoodi Bohra sect).

After the demise of his father he served his uncle the 48th Da'i al-Mutlaq Abdul Husain Husamuddin with the same zeal and dedication as he served his father. His uncle appointed him as Mukasir e Dawat (The third highest position in Dawoodi Bohra sect). He was also the Wali of Mumbai. When he visited Karbala for the ziyarat of Imam Husain accompanied by Aaisaheba Amatulla Aaisaheba, he asked her to stand very close to the Zarih Mubarak of Imam Husain so that the child in her womb can get the blessings of Imam Husain. At that time that child in her womb was Taher Saifuddin.

In the year 1891 AD his uncle 48th Da'i al-Mutlaq decided to go to Mumbai. At the time of his departure he said, "I am leaving my mansoos (appointed successor by nass) and jaan nasheen Mohammed Burhanuddin behind me." In this way his uncle did nass upon him. His uncle became ill during the journey. When his uncle reached Ahmedabad, the ailment became very serious so his uncle again performed nass upon him before important post holders of the Dawoodi Bohra community and took a pledge (misaq) from them to uphold the nass and died. And Mohammed Burhanuddin became the 49th Da'i al-Mutlaq of the Dawoodi Bohra sect. At that time he was in Mumbai but was not able to go to Ahmedabad due to heavy rains. Even the skies were mourning the demise of Abdul Husain Husamuddin.

== Life As Da'i al-Mutlaq ==
Mohammed Burhanuddin became the 49th Da'i al-Mutlaq in the year 1891. At that time there were huge debts on the Dawoodi Bohra community. He continued the efforts of the 48th Da'i al-Mutlaq Abdul Husain Husamuddin to pay off the debts of the community. Abdullah Badruddin helped him extensively in this effort. The first five years of his era was marked with great hardship. But in five years he managed to settle all the debts of the community. In the next five years he regularised and organised the functioning of the Dawoodi Bohra sect. For the next five years he ensured that the community becomes secured and that the name of the community is held high in esteem before the world.

He has built many masjids (Places to perform prayers), madrasas (schools to give knowledge about religion) and musafirkhana (places of stay for travellers). He also instituted the custom of providing meals to the travellers who come to pay their respects at the tombs of the deceased leaders and eminent persons of the Dawoodi Bohra sect.

Whenever he visited Mumbai, he stayed in Saifee Mahal. He even performed a waaz (sermon) of Ashura (the tenth day of the first month, Moharam ul Haram, of the Hijri calendar) at Saifee Mahal. This place was later purchased by his son 51st Da'i al-Mutlaq Taher Saifuddin] who made it the House of the Da'i al-Mutlaq.

In the year 1904 he, at the age of 64, went to perform Haj. When he arrived in Kaaba, the King of Hijaz welcomed him with great respect and dignity. A ceremonial procession with him seated on a horse-drawn cart, was taken out on the streets of the markets of Mina. All the people were amazed by the radiance emanating from him. The local people showed their respects towards him by kissing his hands and feet. Not knowing who he was the people were so awestruck by his glory that they regarded him to be an angel.

The year 1906 was marked with sadness for the members of the Dawoodi Bohra community as in this year the vallant and far sighted leader of the Dawoodi Bohra sect, Mohammed Burhanuddin became ill. The members of the community prayed for his recovery. But destiny had sorrow written for in 1906. His ailment became very serious. Such that he conferred nass upon Abdullah Badruddin and died. He remained as Da'i al-Mutlaq for a period of 15 years during which he led the Dawoodi Bohra community out of indebtedness to a position self-reliance and growth where each and every member of the Dawoodi Bohra community is happy and prospering.

== Achievements ==
When Mohammed Burhanuddin became the 49th Da'i al-Mutlaq, the Dawoodi Bohra sect was greatly indebted, unorganized and there was lack of development.

Burhanuddin charted out a plan to change the position of the Dawoodi Bohra sect which was as follows:

- For the first five years he devoted all his time and efforts to pay off the debts of the sect. He approached the affluent and the prominent members of the community personally to raise the amount to pay off the debts. Such that all the debts were paid off during or by the end of five years.
- For the next five years he concentrated on restructuring the organisational hierarchy of the Dawoodi Bohra community such that control and responsibility were established. This allowed the smooth functioning of the different departments and solved all the hurdles they had faced earlier. At the end of five years all the organisations of the Dawoodi Bohra community had become very efficient and began functioning effectively, managing the affairs of the community in an orderly manner.
- The next five years he put in all his efforts towards the development of the community. He worked out ways and means to bring about growth and prosperity in the community. It is because of his efforts that within a period of five years had the Dawoodi Bohra community reached great heights as regards growth and standard of living.

He has built a number of masjids, so as to facilitate the members of the community to perform their prayers and other tenents of the religion.

He set up many madrasas so as to facilitate learning of the religious teachings such that the current generation and the new generations would have a correct and same picture of the religion, its tenets, its beliefs and its culture.

He made many musafirkhanas mostly near the places of the tombs of various Da'i al-Mutlaq and eminent members of Dawoodi Bohra sect so as to facilitate people from far away places to visit these tombs and pay their respects.

He further went ahead and started the custom of making free food arrangements available for the visitors of the musafirkhanas. Such that people of the community members can come and stay at these musafirkhanas, pay their respects to the tombs present there without any worry about their food requirements.

All these brought great prosperity and growth in the community such that during the last moments of his life he was very satisfied with his efforts and chanted the name of Maulana Ali, whose famous last words were "I swear by the God of Khaba, I have won". Mohammed Burhanuddin too had won in his life.

Shia Islam titles
Mohammed Burhanuddin I Dā'ī al-Mutlaq Born: 18 November 1840 Died: 21 February 1906
Preceded by Abdul Husain Husamuddin	49th Da'i al-Mutlaq; 1891-1906	Succeeded by Abdullah Badruddin
