= Khanji Feer =

Indian religious figure

Syedi Khanji Pheer was an Indian Ismaili Dawoodi Bohra saint. He lived in the 17th century. His family settled in Udaipur, coming from Gujarat during Udaipur's establishment. He was titled Saheb-e-Hiqmatul-Marefat (master of religious philosophy and mysticism). He was the teacher of seven Dawoodi Bohra Da'is.

== Legacy ==
Khanji Pheer died on the 2nd of Muharram 1117 AH (1695 A.D.). His shrine (dargah) is in Udaipur, in the locality of Khanjipir, which is named after him. A gold carved plate above his shrine was written by Syedi Abdul Qadir Hakimuddin of Burhanpur.

He has family links with Dawoodi Bohra Dais through his daughter Maryam Aai. 49th and 52nd Dai Syedna Mohammad Burhanuddin, 51st Dai Syedna Taher Saifuddin and current Dai Syedna Mufaddal Saifuddin are from his progeny. His step daughter Husaina Aai was wife of Syedna Taher Saifuddin and mother of Syedna Mohammed Burhanuddin. Family tree placed below illustrate the clear link.

== Gallery ==
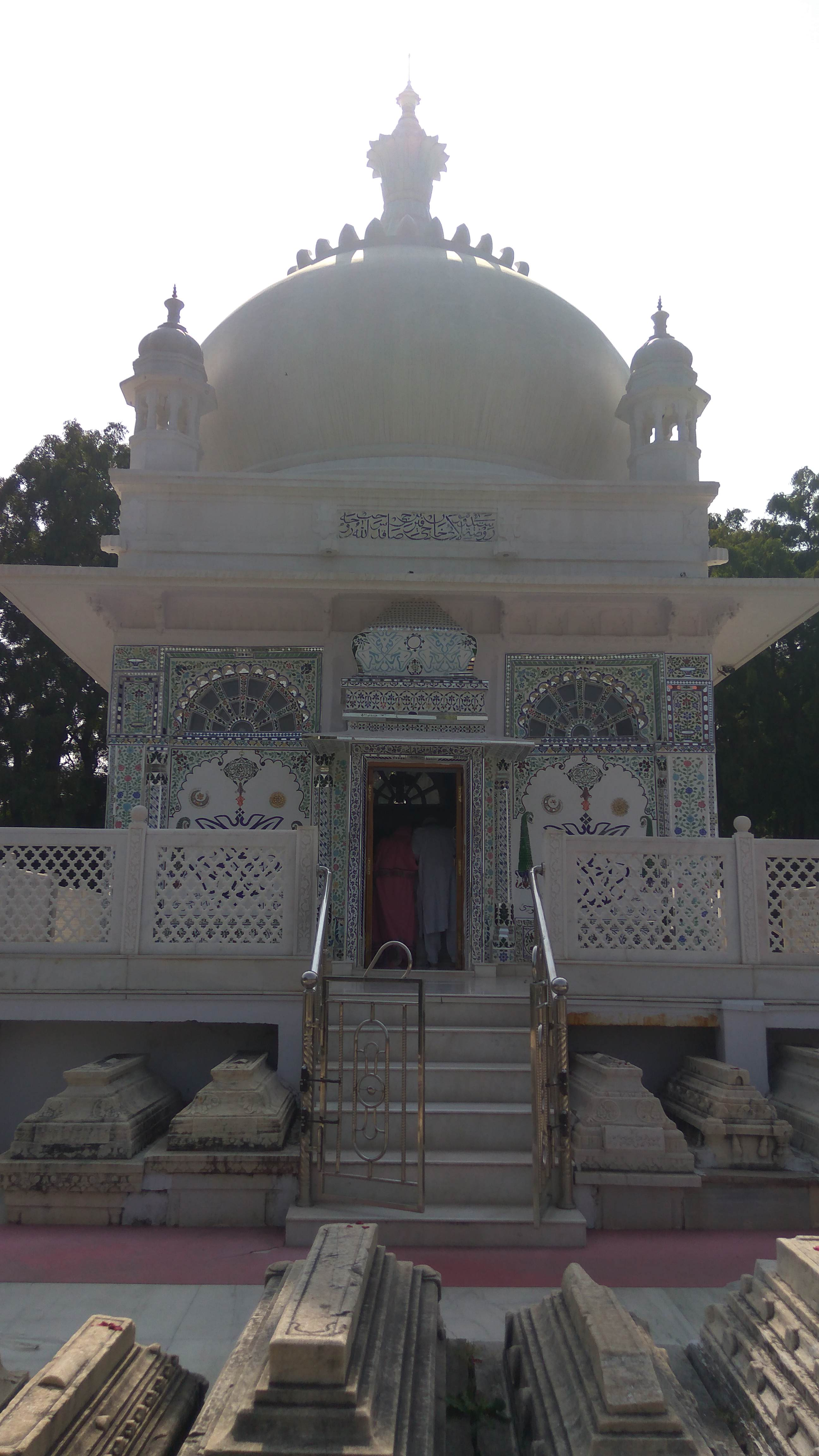
Mausoleum Syedi Khanji Feer, Udaipur

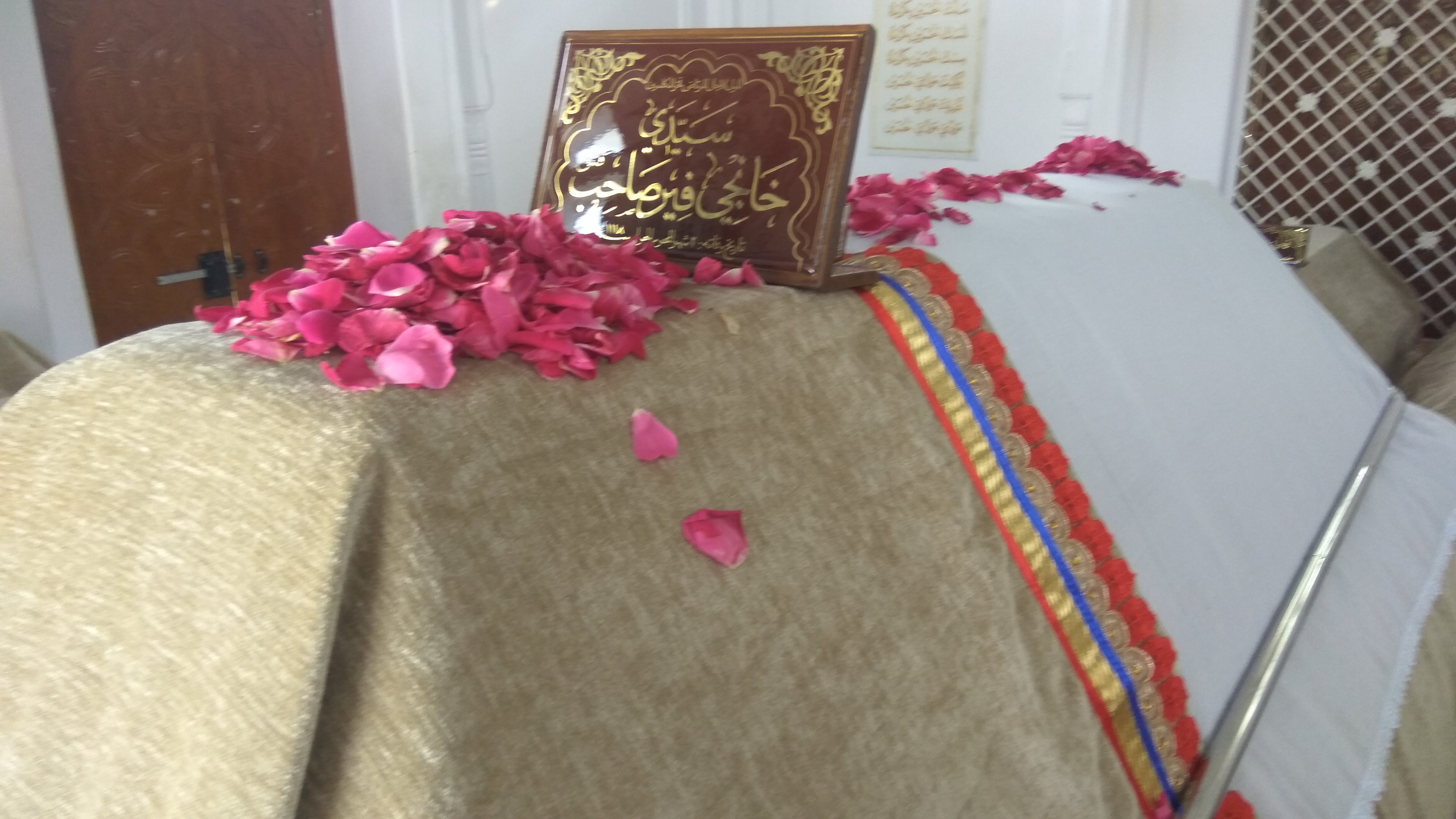

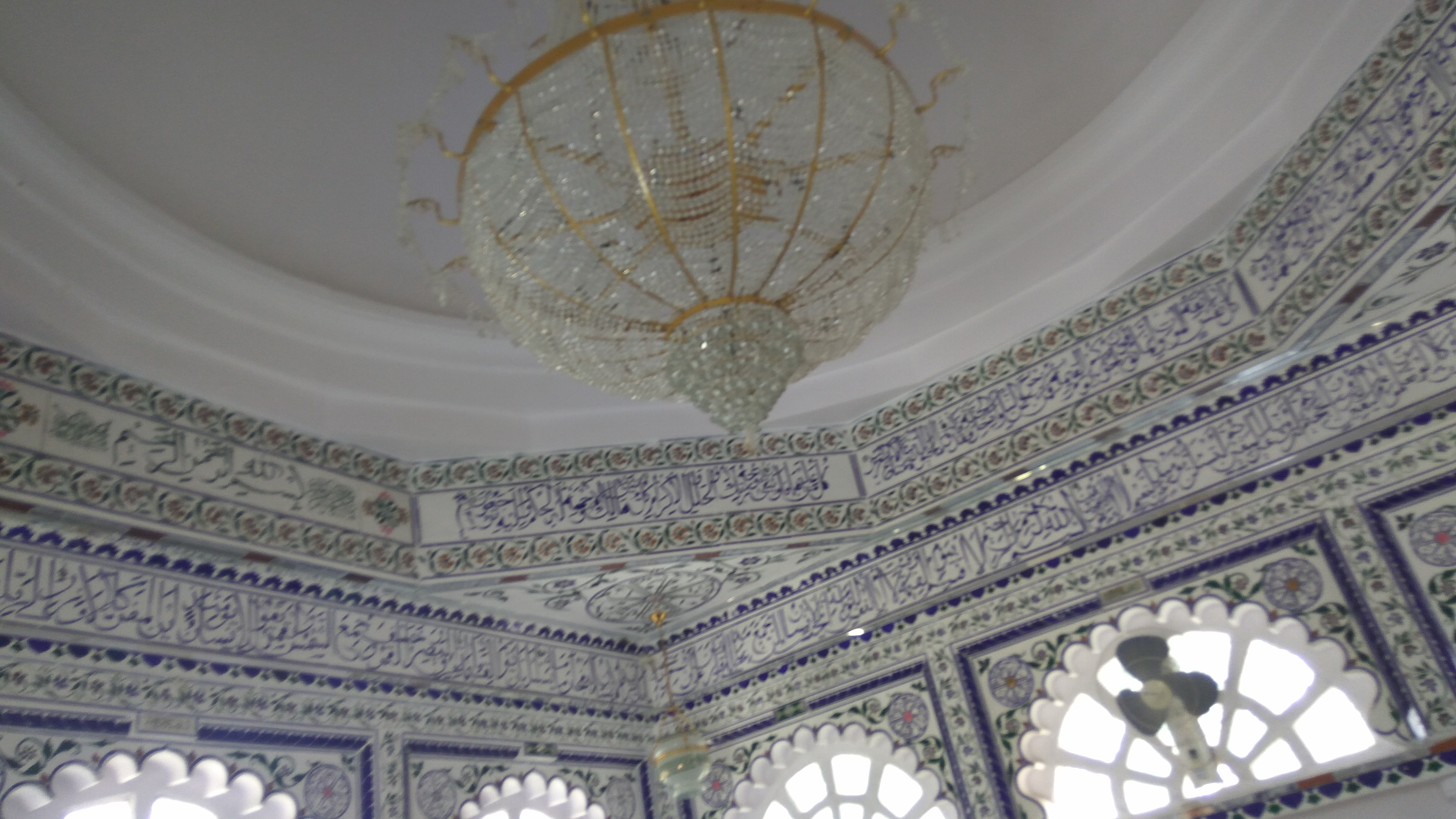
Mausoleum interior decoration
