= Mohammed Ezzuddin =

Syedna Mohammed Ezzuddin 44th Da'i al-Mutlaq of the Dawoodi Bohra
- مُحَمّد عِزُّالدّين
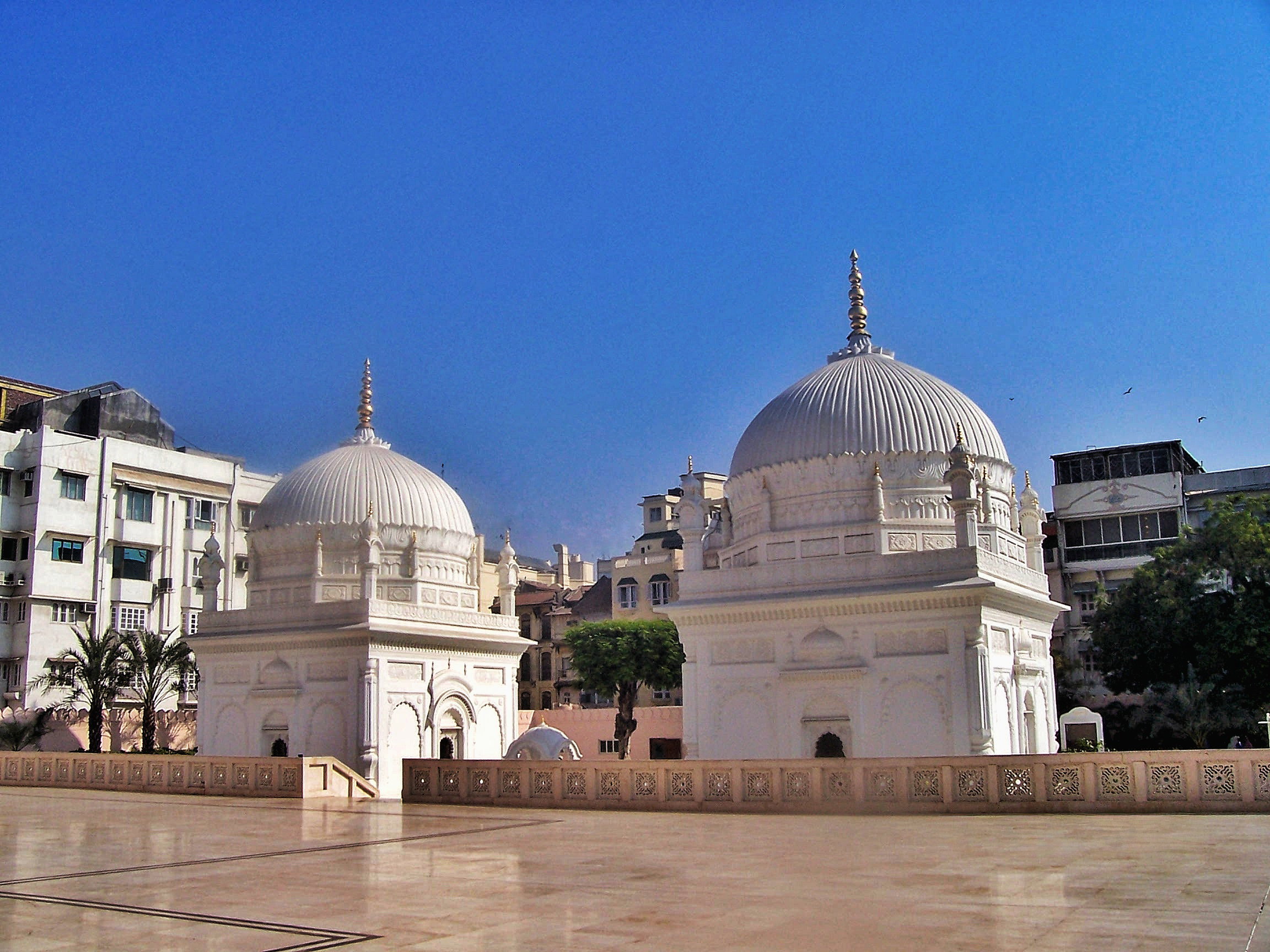
- Mazar-e-Saifee, Surat, where Syedna Ezzuddin is buried.

Da'i al-Mutlaq
- In office 1817 AD (1232 AH) – 1821 AD (1236 AH)
- Preceded by: Abde Ali Saifuddin
- Succeeded by: Tayyeb Zainuddin
- Title: Syedna; Maulana; Da'i al-Mutlaq; Da'i al-Fatemi

Personal life
- Born: 1788
- Died: 19 June 1821 Surat, India
- Resting place: Mazar-e-Saifee, Surat, India
- Parents: Syedi Jivanjee bin Shaikh Dawood bhai (father); Buji BaiSaheba binte Mulla Ahmed-ji (mother)

Religious life
- Religion: Shi'a Islam
- Sect: Isma'ili; Dawoodi Bohra
- Jurisprudence: Mustaali; Tayyabi

Syedna Mohammed Ezzuddin Bin Syedi Jivanjee (died on 19 Ramadan al-Moazzam 1236 AH/1821 AD, Surat, India) was the 44th Da'i al-Mutlaq of the Dawoodi Bohra sect. He succeeded the 43rd Da'i, Syedna Abde'Ali Saifuddin, to the religious post at the age of 29. He was born in 1788.

Dai period: 1232–1236 AH/1817–1821 AD
Place of dai office: Surat, India
Death:19 Ramadan al-Moazzam 1236
Mazoon: Syedi SheikhAdam Safiyuddin
Mukasir: Tayyeb Zainuddin

== Family ==
His father was Syedi Jivanjee bin Shaikh Dawood bhai and his mother was Buji BaiSaheba binte Mulla Ahmed-ji. He was the brother of the Da'i who succeeded him, Syedna Tayyeb Zainuddin. Buji BaiSaheba's father was the grandson of Syedi Abdul Qadir Hakimuddin while her mother Aamena BaiSaheba was the great-grand-daughter of Syedi Hasanji Badshah, a descendant of Syedi Fakhruddin Shaheed.

== Accession ==
Syedna Mohammed Ezzuddin became Da'i al-Mutlaq in 1232 AH/1817 AD at the age of 29. His period of Dawat was 1232–1236 AH/1817–1821 AD.

== Death ==
Syedna Mohammed Ezzuddin suffered from acute abdominal pain which had a debilitating effect. He died at the age of 33.

Shia Islam titles
Mohammed Ezzuddin Dā'ī al-Mutlaq Born: 1788 Died: 19 June 1821
Preceded by Moulana Abdeali Saifuddin	44th Dā'ī al-Mutlaq; 1232–1236 AH/1817–1821 AD	Succeeded by Tayyeb Zainuddin
