= Tayyeb Zainuddin =

Syedna Tayyeb Zainuddin 45th Da'i al-Mutlaq of the Dawoodi Bohra
- طَيِّب زَينُ الدّين
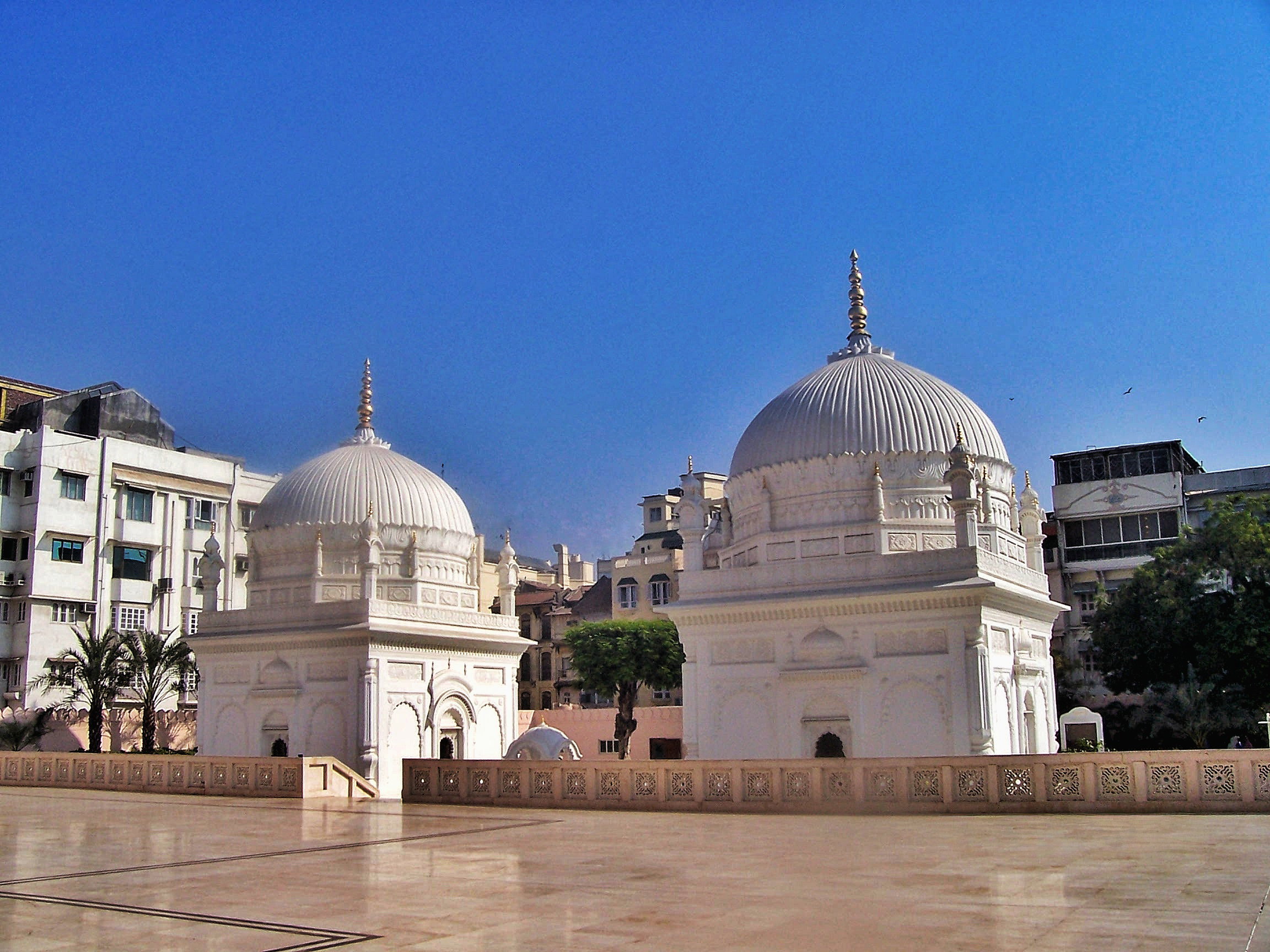
- Mazar-e-Saifee (Surat), the final resting place of Syedna Zainuddin.

Da'i al-Mutlaq
- In office 1821 (1236 AH) – 1836 (1252 AH)
- Preceded by: Mohammed Ezzuddin
- Succeeded by: Mohammed Badruddin
- Title: Syedna; Maulana; Da'i al-Fatemi; Da'i al-Mutlaq

Personal life
- Born: 1782
- Died: 20 February 1837 Surat, India
- Resting place: Mazar-e Saifee, Surat
- Parents: Syedi Jivanjee bin Shaikh Dawood bhai (father); Buji BaiSaheba binte Mulla Ahmed-ji (mother)

Religious life
- Religion: Shi'a Islam
- Sect: Ismailism; Dawoodi Bohra
- Jurisprudence: Mustaali; Tayyibi

Syedna Tayyeb Zainuddin Bin Syedi Jivanjee (born: 1782 AD; died on 15 Zilqad al-Haraam 1252 AH/1836 AD, Surat, India) was the 45th Da'i al-Mutlaq of the Dawoodi Bohra sect. He succeeded his brother, the 44th Da'i, Syedna Mohammed Ezzuddin Bin Syedi Jivanjee, to the religious post at the age of 38 years.

Dai period: 1236–1252 AH/1821–1836 AD
Place of da'i office: Surat, India
Death: 15th Zilqad al-Haraam, 1252 AH
Mawazeen: Syedi SheikhAdam Safiyuddin, Syedi Hebatullah Jamaluddin
Mukasir: Mohammed Badruddin

== Family ==
His father's name was Syedi Jivanjee bin Shaikh Dawood bhai while his mother's name was Buji BaiSaheba binte Mulla Ahmed-ji. He was the elder brother of the previous Da'i (Mohammed Ezzuddin). Buji BaiSaheba's father was the grandson of Syedi Abdul Qadir Hakimuddin while her mother Aamena BaiSaheba was the great-granddaughter of Syedi Hasanji Badshah, a descendant of Syedi Fakhruddin Shaheed.

== Accession ==
Tayyeb Zainuddin became Da'i al-Mutlaq in 1236 AH/1821 AD. His period of Dawat was 1821–1836 AD/1236-1252 AH.

== Death ==
He died aged 54. The present Da'i descends from him.

Shia Islam titles
Tayyeb Zainuddin Dā'ī al-Mutlaq Born: 1782 Died: 20 February 1837
Preceded by Mohammed Ezzuddin	45th Dā'ī al-Mutlaq; 1236–1252 AH/1821–1836 AD	Succeeded by Mohammed Badruddin
