= Abdul Husain Husamuddin =

Da'i al-Mutlaq of the Dawoodi Bohra

Syedna AbdulHusain Husamuddin 48th Dā'ī al-Mutlaq of the Dawoodi Bohra
- عَبدُالحُسَين حُسامُ الدِين
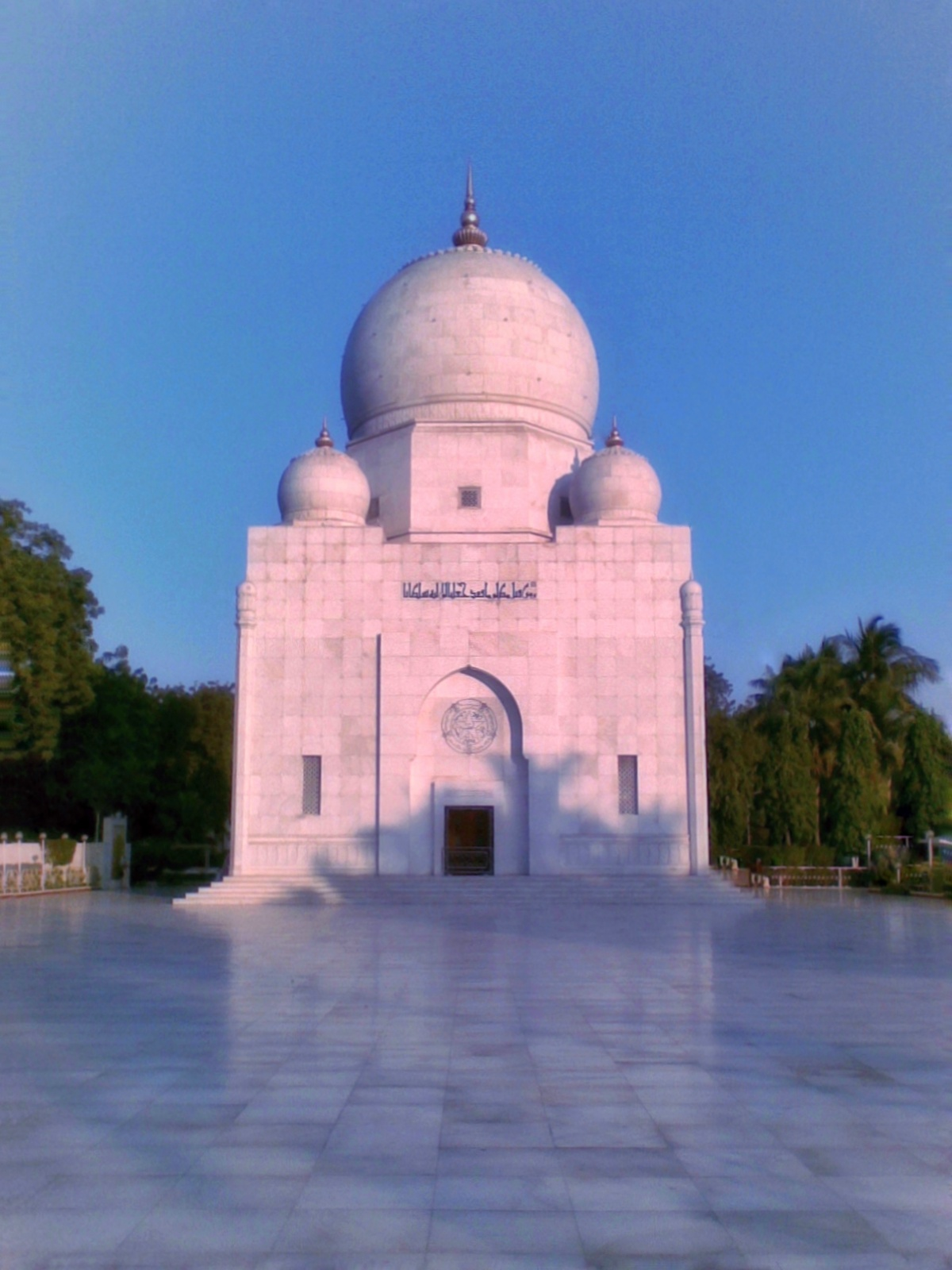
- Mazar-e-Qutbi, Ahmedabad, where Syedna AbdulHusain Husamuddin is buried.

Da'i al-Mutlaq
- In office 1885–1891
- Preceded by: Abdul Qadir Najmuddin
- Succeeded by: Mohammed Burhanuddin I
- Title: Syedna; Maulana; Da'i al-Mutlaq; Da'i al-Fatemi

Personal life
- Born: 10th Muharram al-Haram 1239 AH/1823 AD
- Died: 27th Zilhijjat al-Haram 1308 AH/1891 AD
- Resting place: Mazar-e-Qutbi, Ahmedabad, India

Religious life
- Religion: Shi'a Islam
- Sect: Ismailism; Dawoodi Bohra
- Jurisprudence: Mustaali; Tayyibi

Syedna AbdulHusain Husamuddin bin Syedna Tayyeb Zainuddin was the 48th Da'i al-Mutlaq of the Dawoodi Bohra. He was born on the day of Ashura (10th Muharram al-Haram) in 1239 AH/1823 AD and died on 27th Zilhijjat al-Haram 1308 AH/1891 AD in Ahmedabad, India.

He succeeded his brother, the 47th Da'i, Syedna AbdulQadir Najmuddin, to the religious post. Syedna Husamuddin became Da'i al-Mutlaq in 1302 AH/1885 AD. His period of Dawat was 1302–1308 AH/1885–1891 AD. Syedna Abdul Husain Husamuddin appointed or gave nass to Syedna Mohammad Burhanuddin (49th Dai) as his successor.

Shia Islam titles
Abdul Husain Husamuddin Dā'ī al-Mutlaq Born: 10th Muharram al-Haram 1239 AH/1823 AD Died: 27th Zilhijjat al-Haram 1308 AH/1891 AD
Preceded by Abdul Qadir Najmuddin	48th Dā'ī al-Mutlaq; 1302–1308 AH/ 1885–1891 AD	Succeeded by Mohammad Burhanuddin (49th Dai)
