= Abdul Qadir Najmuddin =

47th Da'i al-Mutlaq of Dawoodi Bohra sect (1814–1885)

Syedna Syedna AbdulQadir Najmuddin 47th Da'i al-Mutlaq of the Dawoodi Bohra
- عبدُالقادِر نَجمُ الدّين
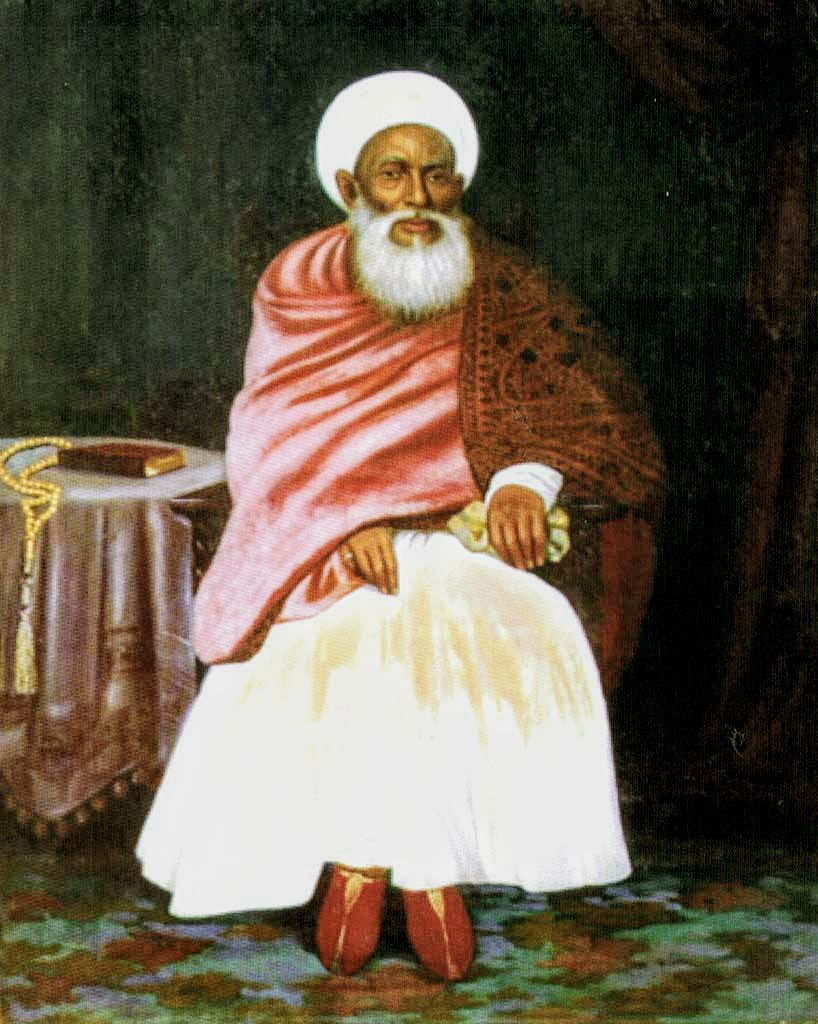

Da'i al-Mutlaq
- In office 1840–1885
- Preceded by: Mohammed Badruddin
- Succeeded by: Abdul Husain Husamuddin
- Title: Syedna; Maulana; Da'i al-Mutlaq; Da'i al-Fatemi

Personal life
- Born: 18 August 1814 Surat
- Died: 11 May 1885 (aged 70) Ujjain, India
- Resting place: Ujjain, India
- Home town: Mumbai
- Parent: Tayyeb Zainuddin (father)

Religious life
- Religion: Islam
- Sect: Isma'ili; Dawoodi Bohra
- Jurisprudence: Mustaali; Tayyabi

Syedna AbdulQadir Najmuddin bin Syedna Tayyeb Zainuddin (born 18 August 1814 (2nd Ramazan al-Moazzam 1229 AH) – died 11 May 1885) became the 47th Da'i al-Mutlaq of the Dawoodi Bohra sect amid succession disputes.

He was born to Syedna Tayyeb Zainuddin when his father and his father's younger brother Syedna Mohammed Ezzuddin were being trained by Syedna Abdeali Saifuddin to become Da'i al-Mutlaq. He was taught by Syedi Abdeali Imaduddin.

When his father Tayyeb Zainuddin became the 45th Da'i al-Mutlaq, he was seven years old.

He was the Da'i al-Mutlaq until 1885 when he died in an epidemic in Ujjain, where he is buried.

== Early life ==
Syedna Abdul Qadir Najmuddin was born in Mumbai. His father wanted to name him as 'Yusuf' but the Syedna Abdeali Saifuddin changed it to 'Abdul Qadir'. The significance of this was realized later when he became the 47th Da'i al-Mutlaq.

Most of his father's time was devoted to the services of 43rd Da'i al-Mutlaq. So in his infancy he remained mostly attached with the family of Da'i al-Mutlaq. He and Syedna Mohammed Budruddin (who was 3 years older), the son of 43rd Da'i al-Mutlaq grew up together. They were together in almost everything, in their studies, in acquiring knowledge and in their positions in the community.

His father Tayyeb Zainuddin became the 45th Da'i al-Mutlaq of the Dawoodi Bohra sect at the age of 38 years.

== Photo gallery ==
Dargah-e-Najmi

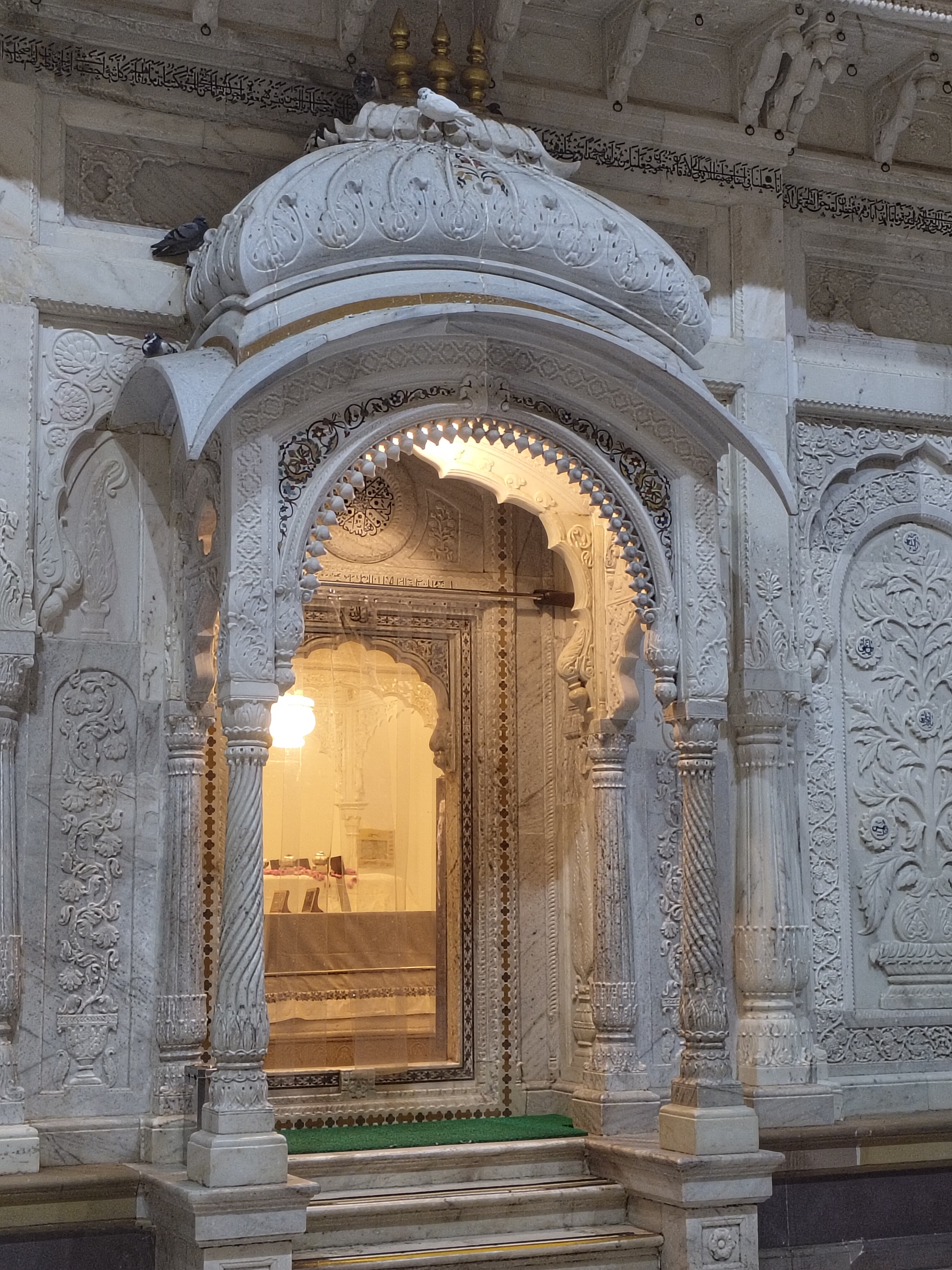
Entrance Dargah-e-Najmi

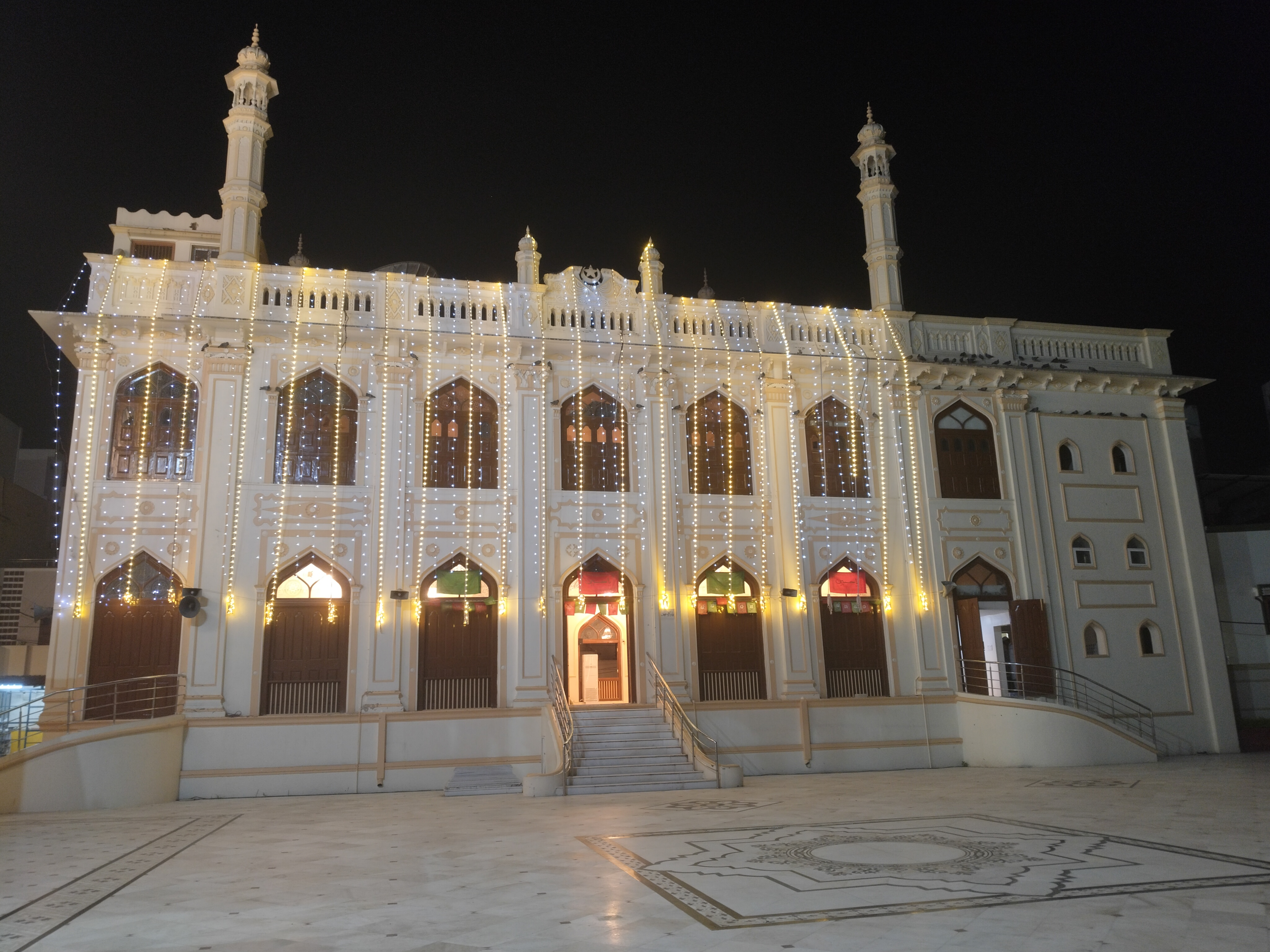
Mosque, Roja premises, Ujjain

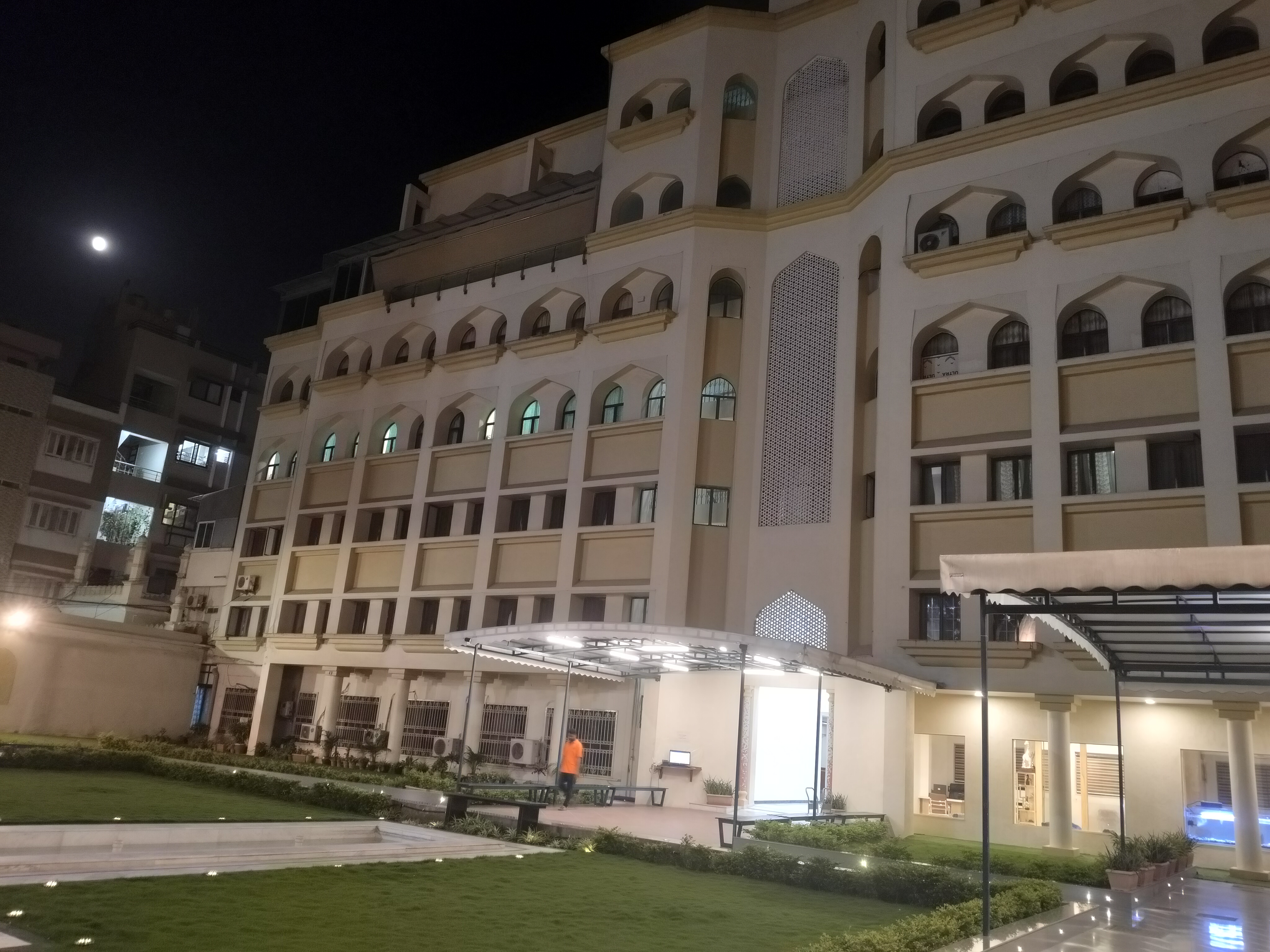
Residential accommodation facility for visitors at Dargah-e-Najmi

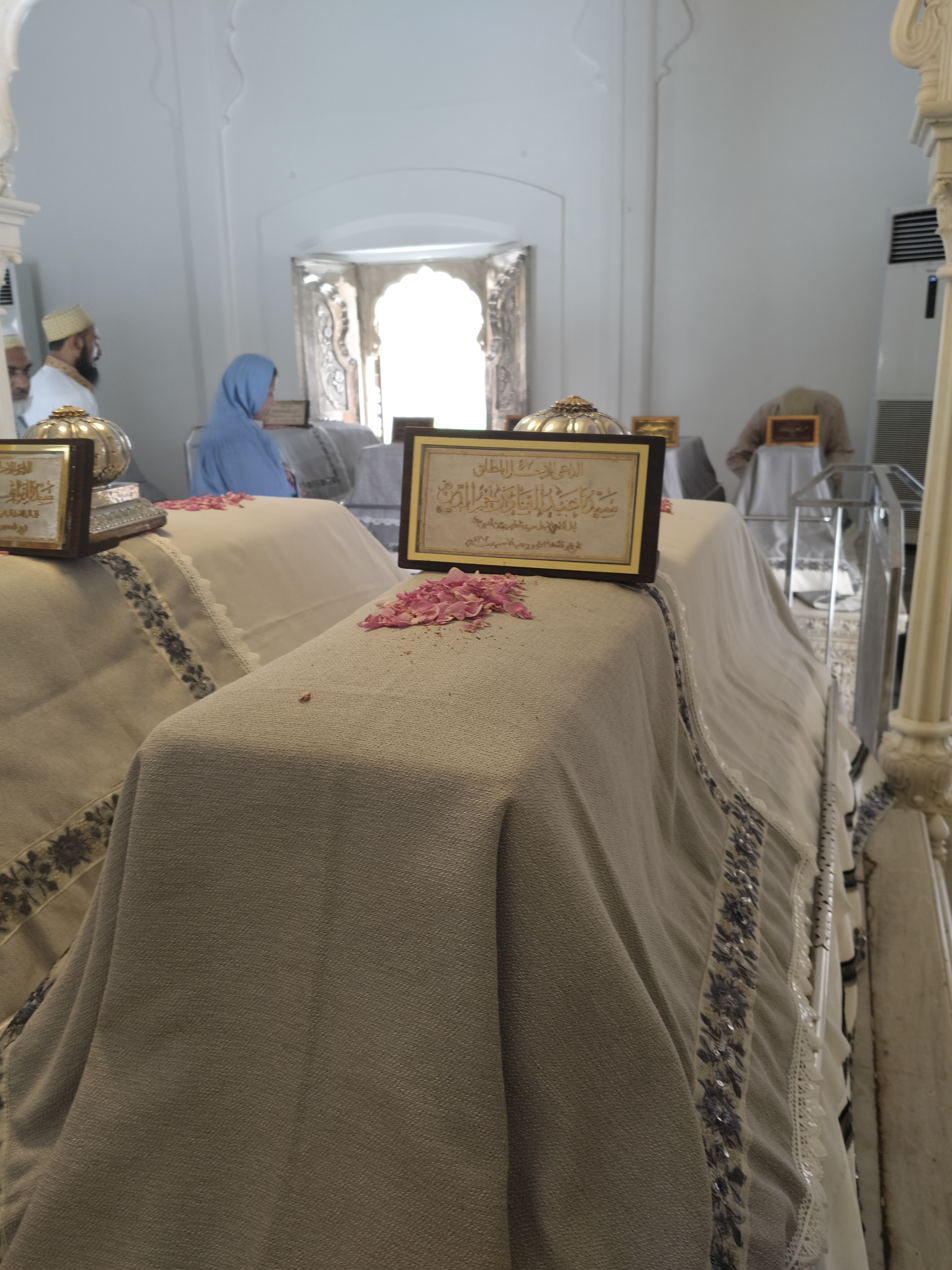
Kabr Syednna Najmuddin, Dargah-e-Najmi, Ujjain

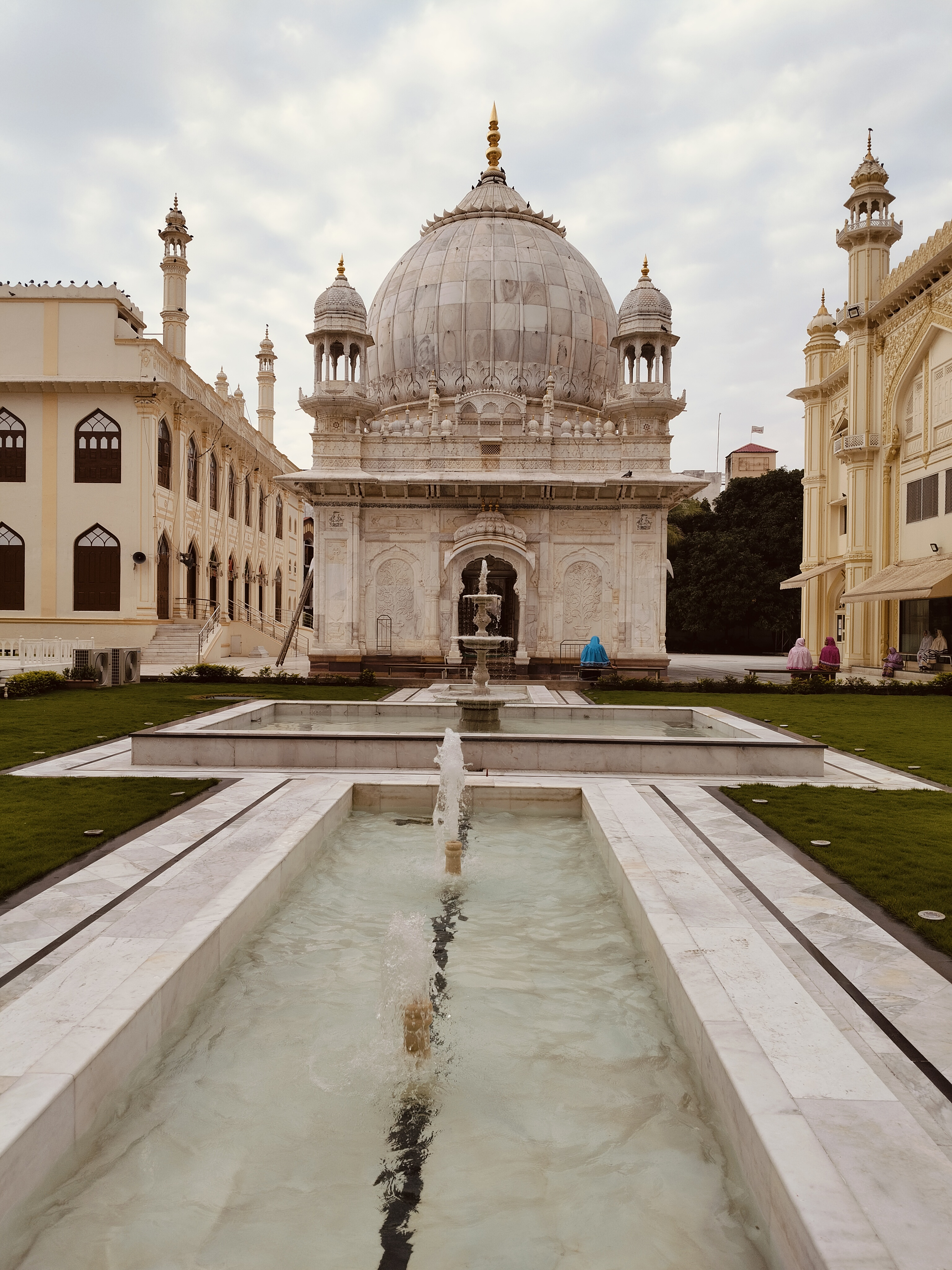
Dargah-e-Najmi, Ujjain

== Family tree ==
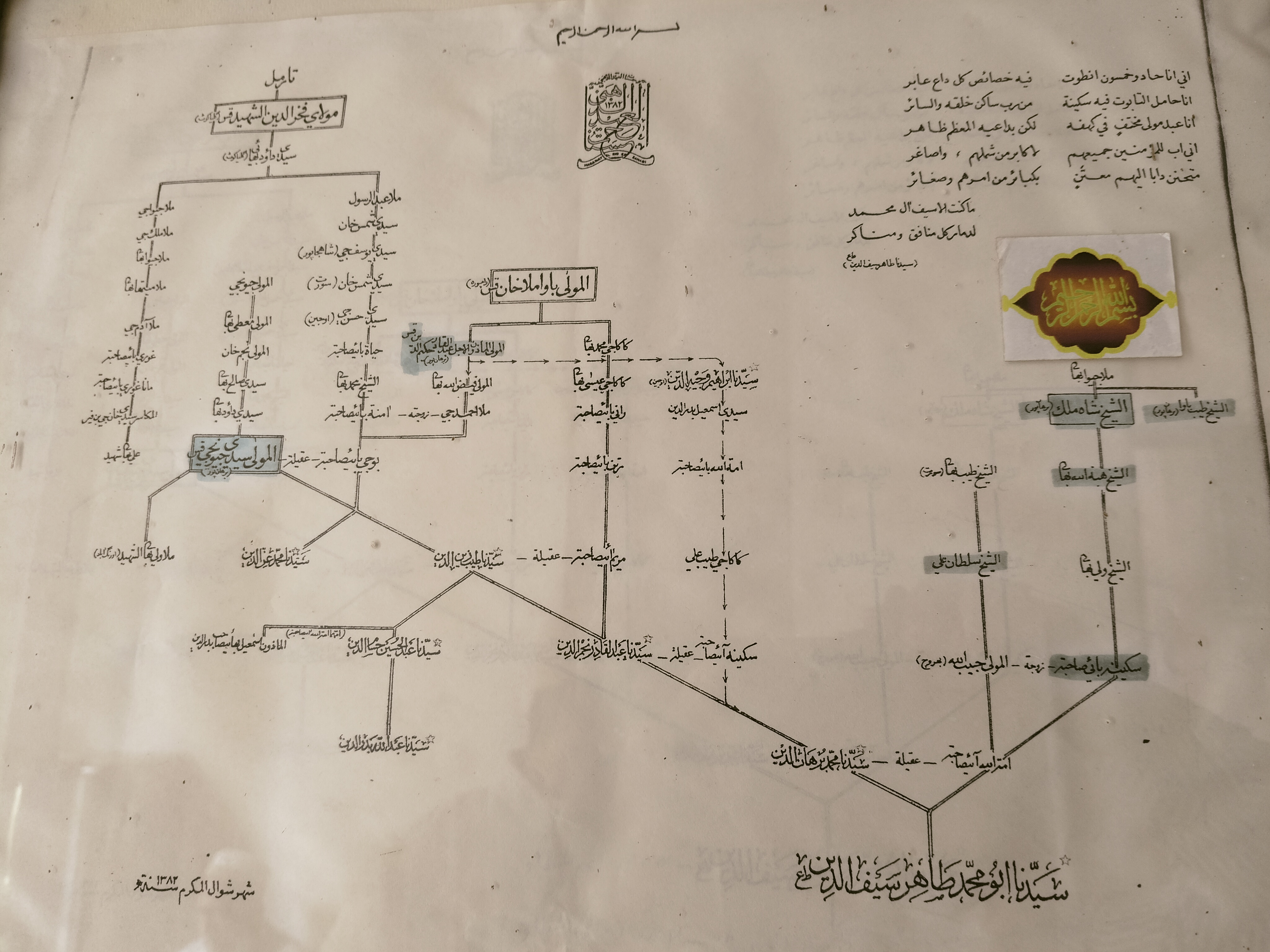
Family Tree Dawoodi Bohra Dais

Shia Islam titles
Abdul Qadir Najmuddin Dā'ī al-Mutlaq Born: 18 August 1814 Died: 11 May 1885
Preceded by Syedna Mohammed Badruddin	47th Da'i al-Mutlaq; 1840–1885	Succeeded by Syedna Abdul Husain Husamuddin
