= Hasan Pir =

14th-century Indian saint

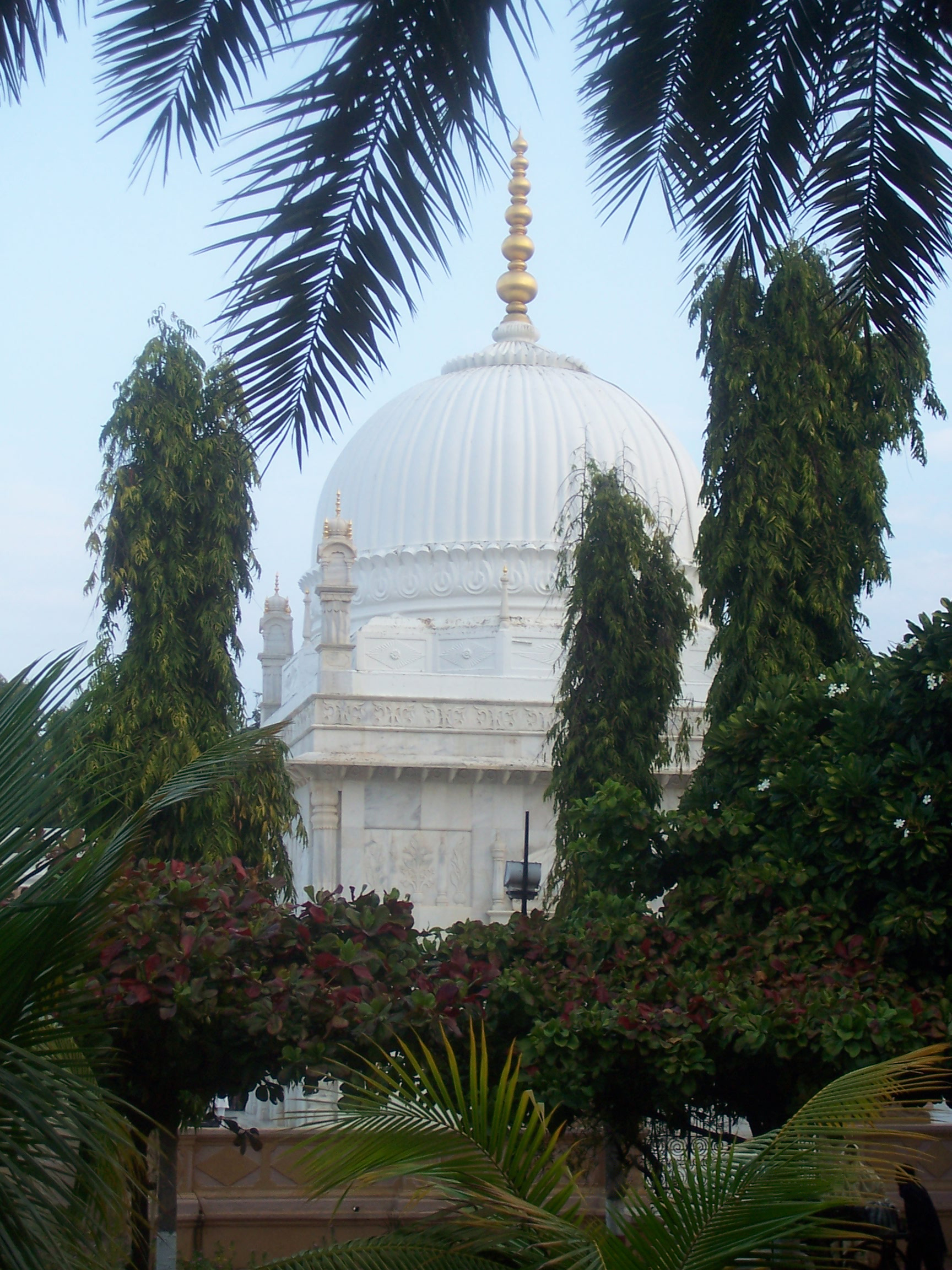
Mausoleum of Hasan Pir, an early leader of the Fatimid Ismaili movement in India.

Syedi Hasan Pir was a Taiyabi Ismaili saint of the 14th century in India. Hasan Pir was fifth Wali-ul-Hind on behalf of the Ismaili Taiyabi Da'i al-Mutlaq of Yemen. He was famous in the court of the Sultan of Patan, during the time of the Delhi Sultan Nasir ud din Muhammad Shah III and from lineage of Moulai Bharmal. See Gujarat under the Delhi Sultanate for further information. He was martyred on 23rd Moharram 795 AH/ 1392 AD, and his mausoleum is located at Denmaal/Delmal, Gujarat.

== Lineage ==
Family tree showing relation with Moulai Bharmal and Dawoodi Bohra duat is as below. He was a descendant of Moulai Bharmal a minister of the King Jayasimha Siddharaja. He is the ancestor of Dawoodi Bohra Dais: 34th dai Syedna Ismail Badruddin, 35th Dai Syedna Abduttayyeb Zakiuddin II, 38th Dai Syedna Ismail Badruddin, 41st to 43rd Dai Syedna Abduttayyeb Zakiuddin III, Yusuf Najmuddin, Abde Ali Saifuddin and 46th Dai Syedna Mohammed Badruddin.

== Photo gallery ==
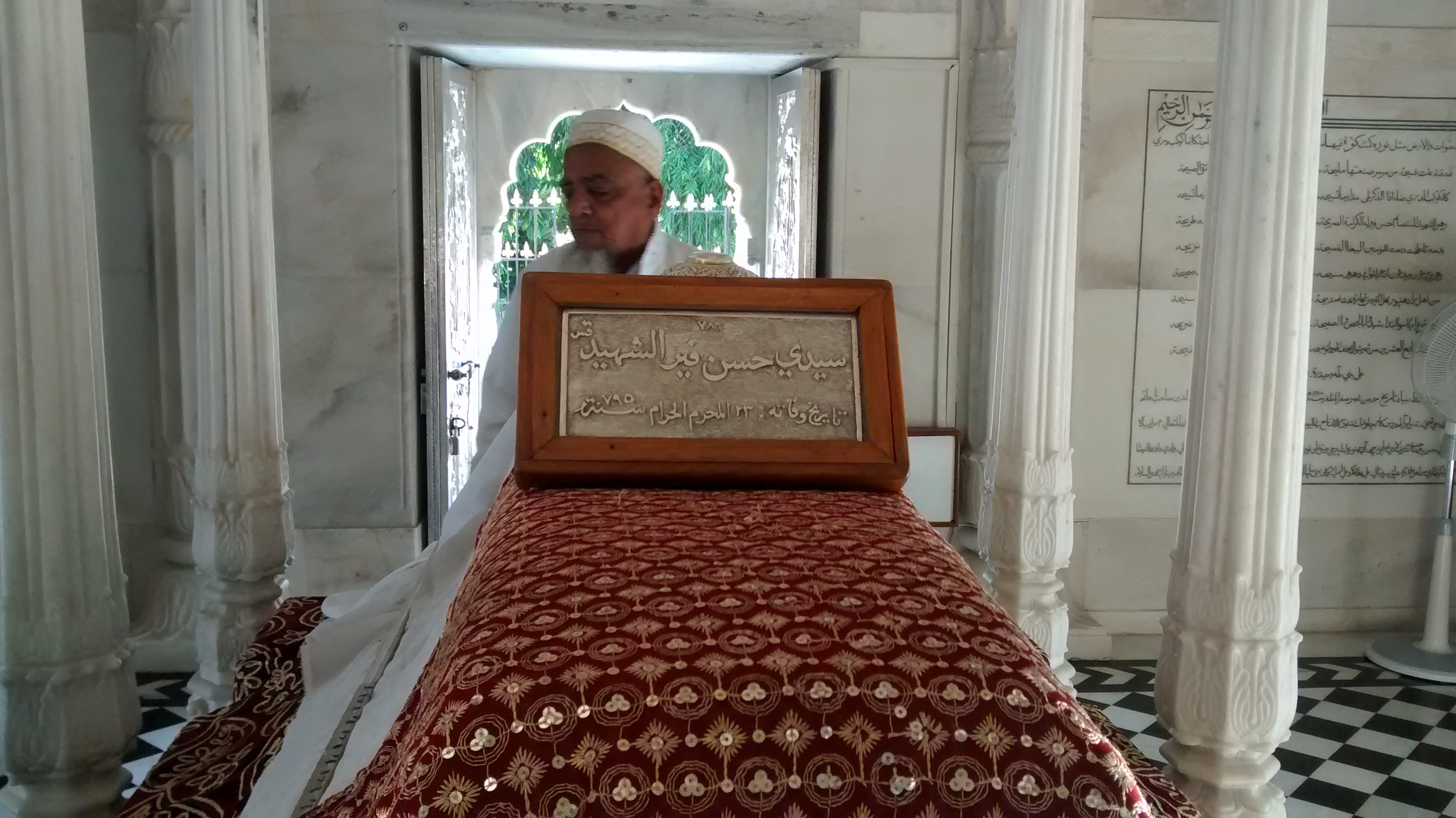
Grave Moulai Hasan Pir

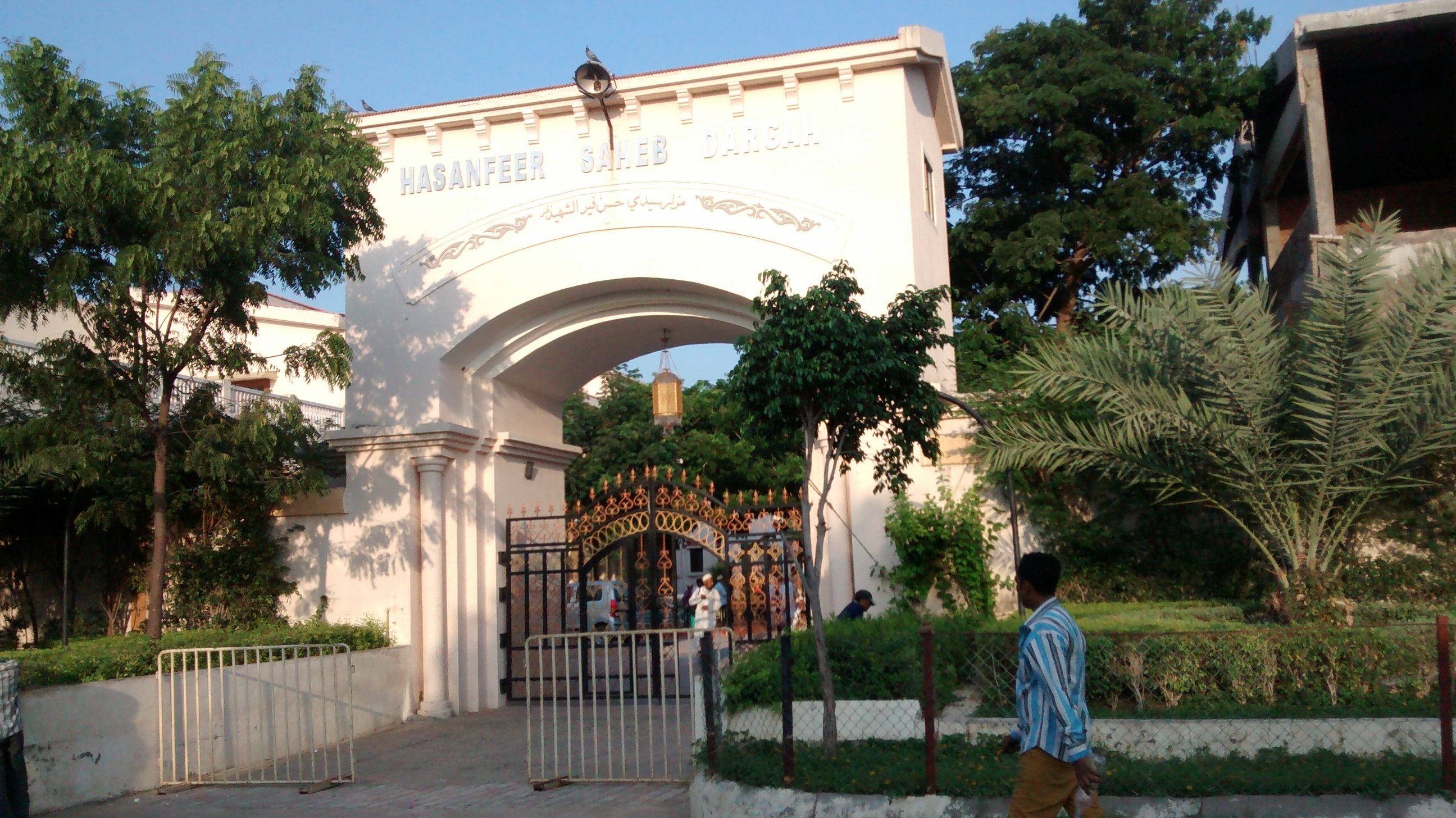
Main entrance, Hasan Pir Dargah Compound

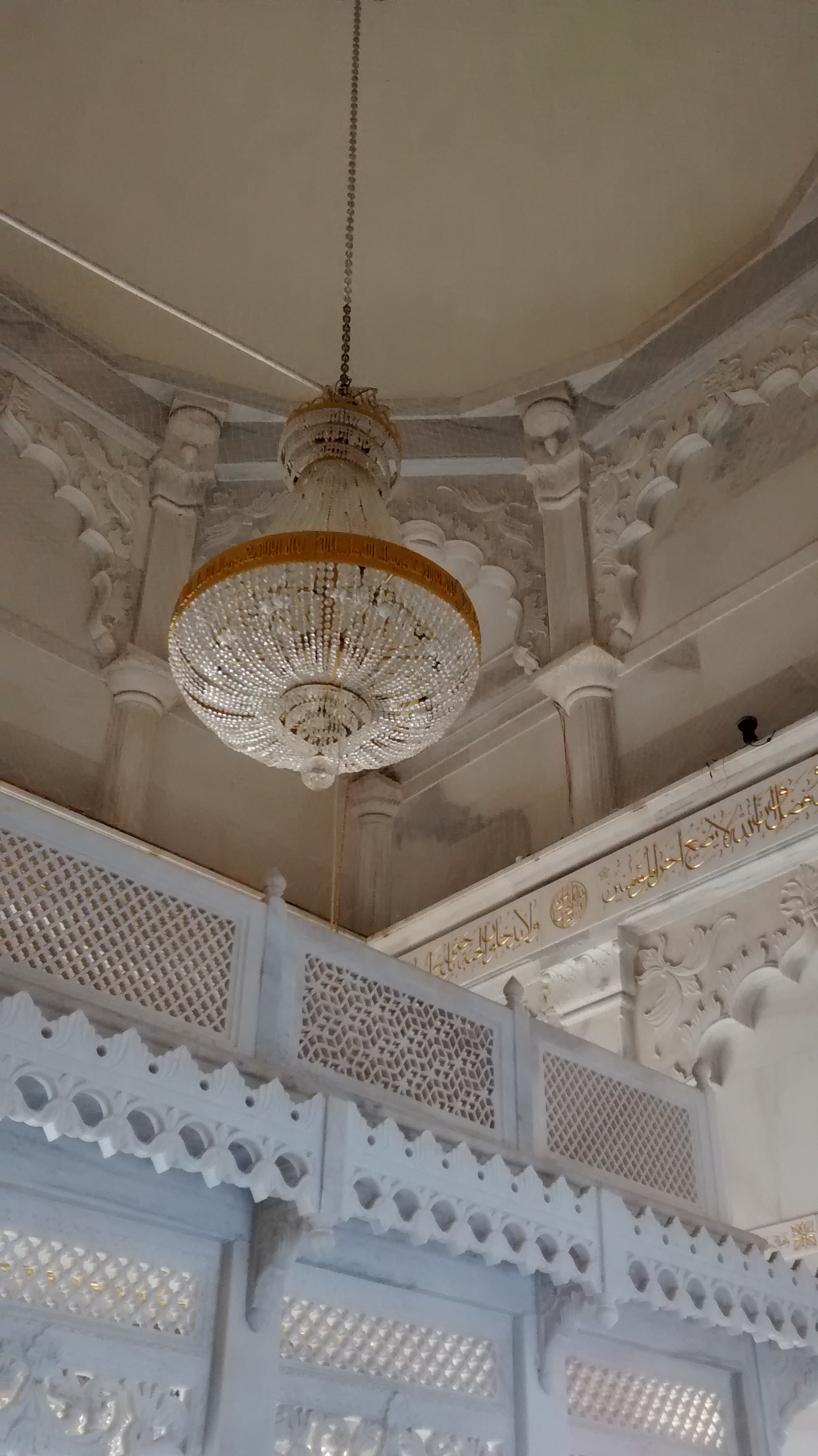
Interior Mausoleum hasan Pir

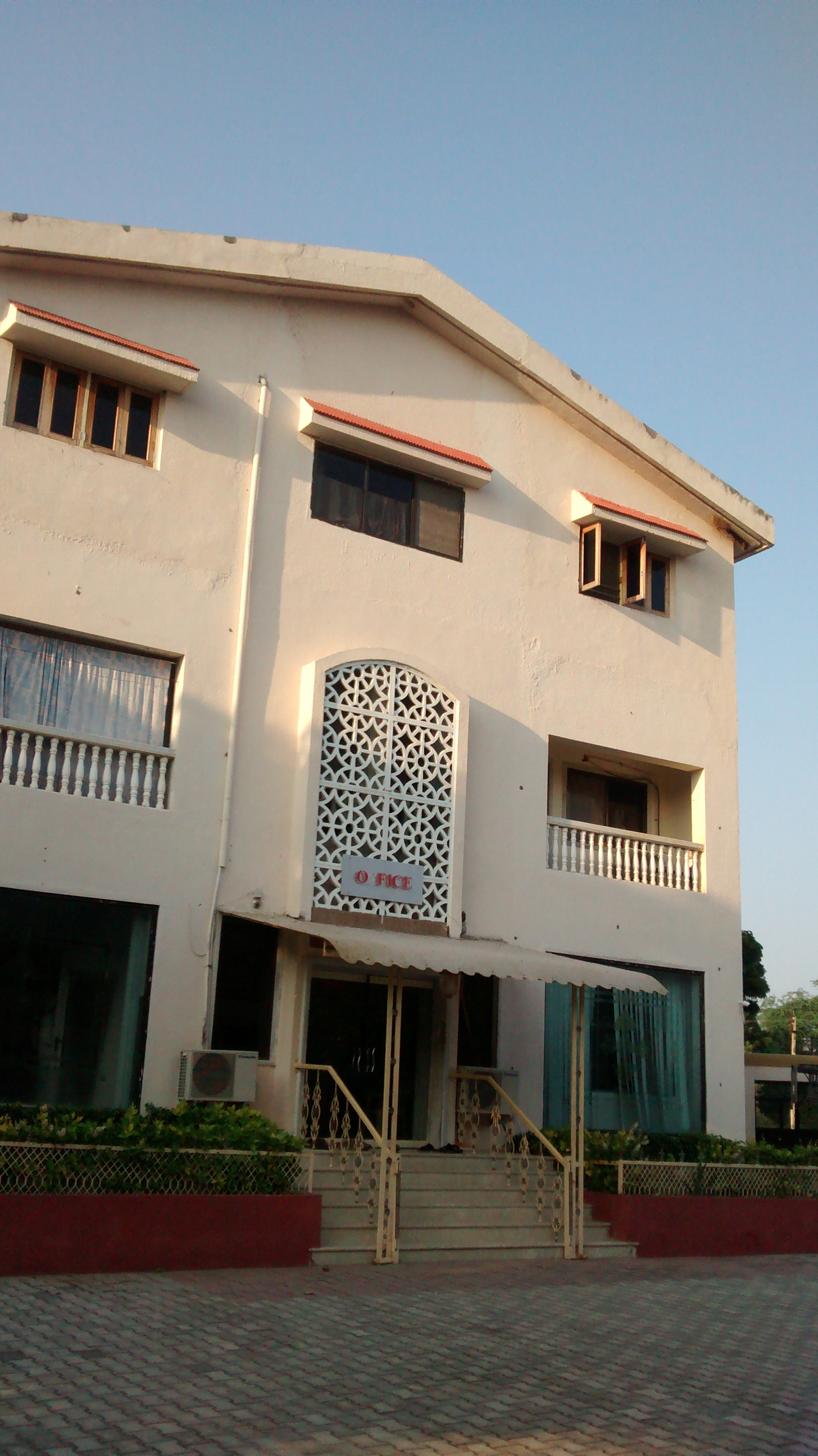
Office Hasan Pir Dargah

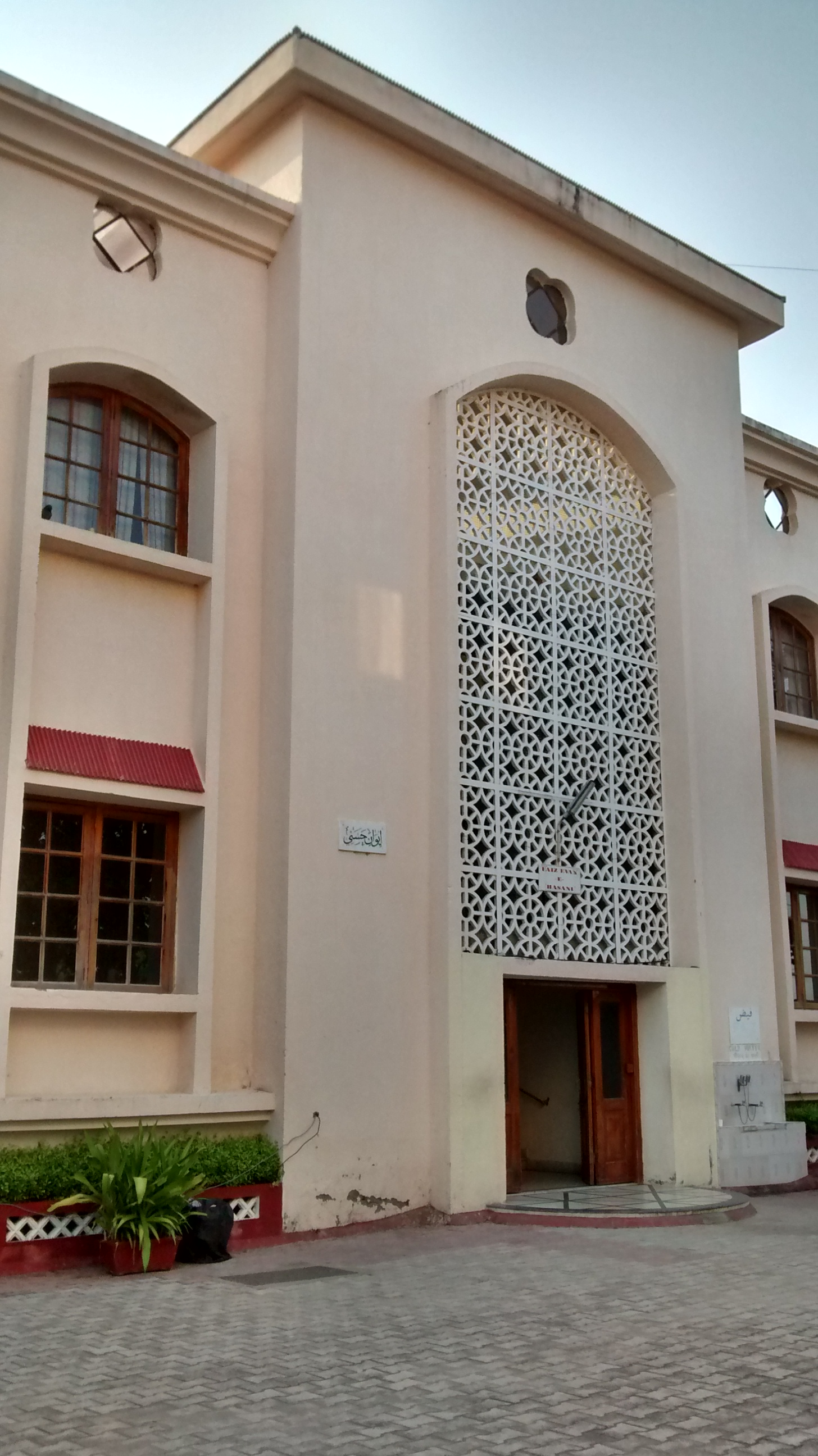
Dining Hall(Mawaid), Hasan Pir Dargah

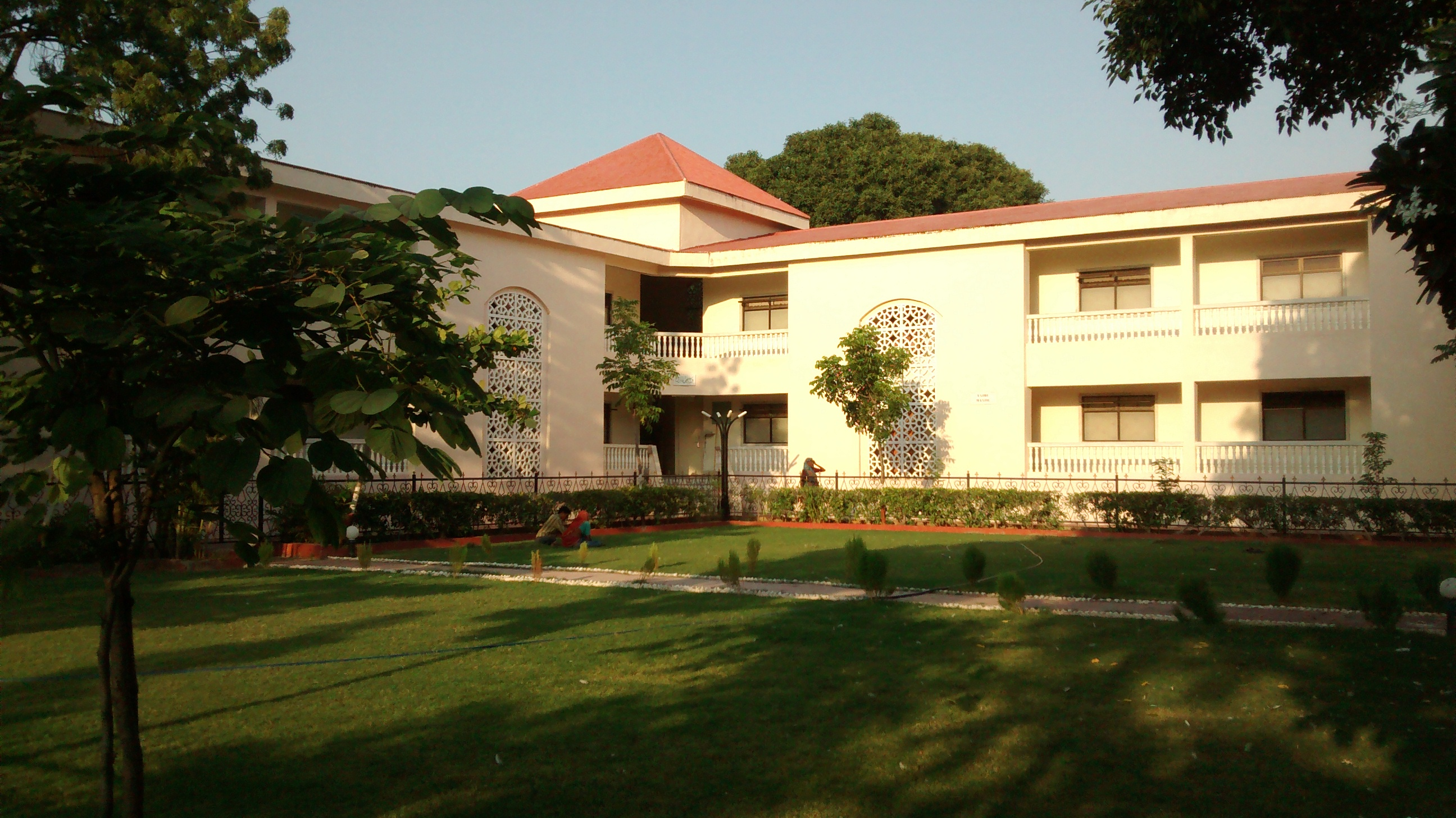
Residential banglow for visitors

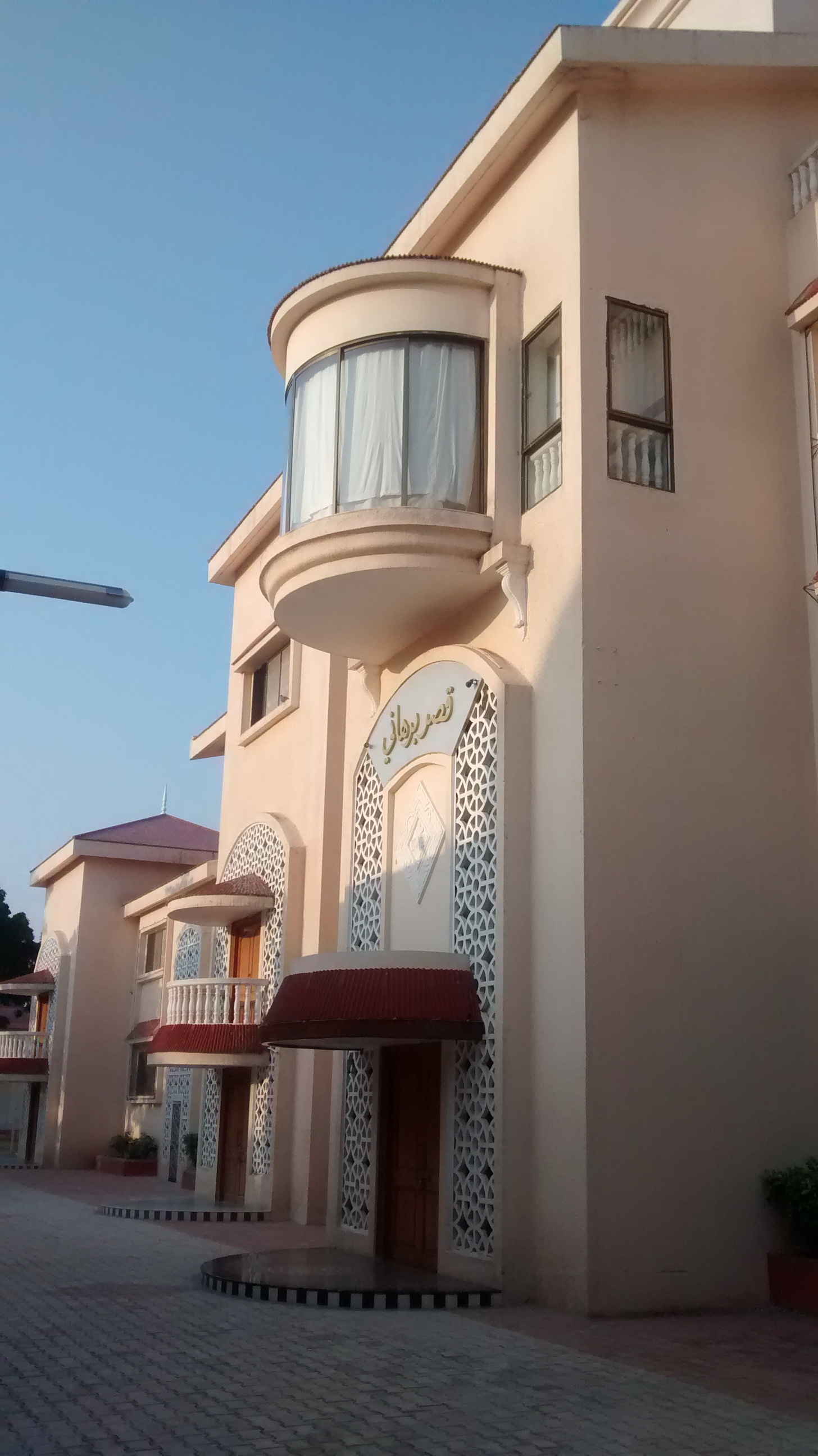
Kashre Burhani

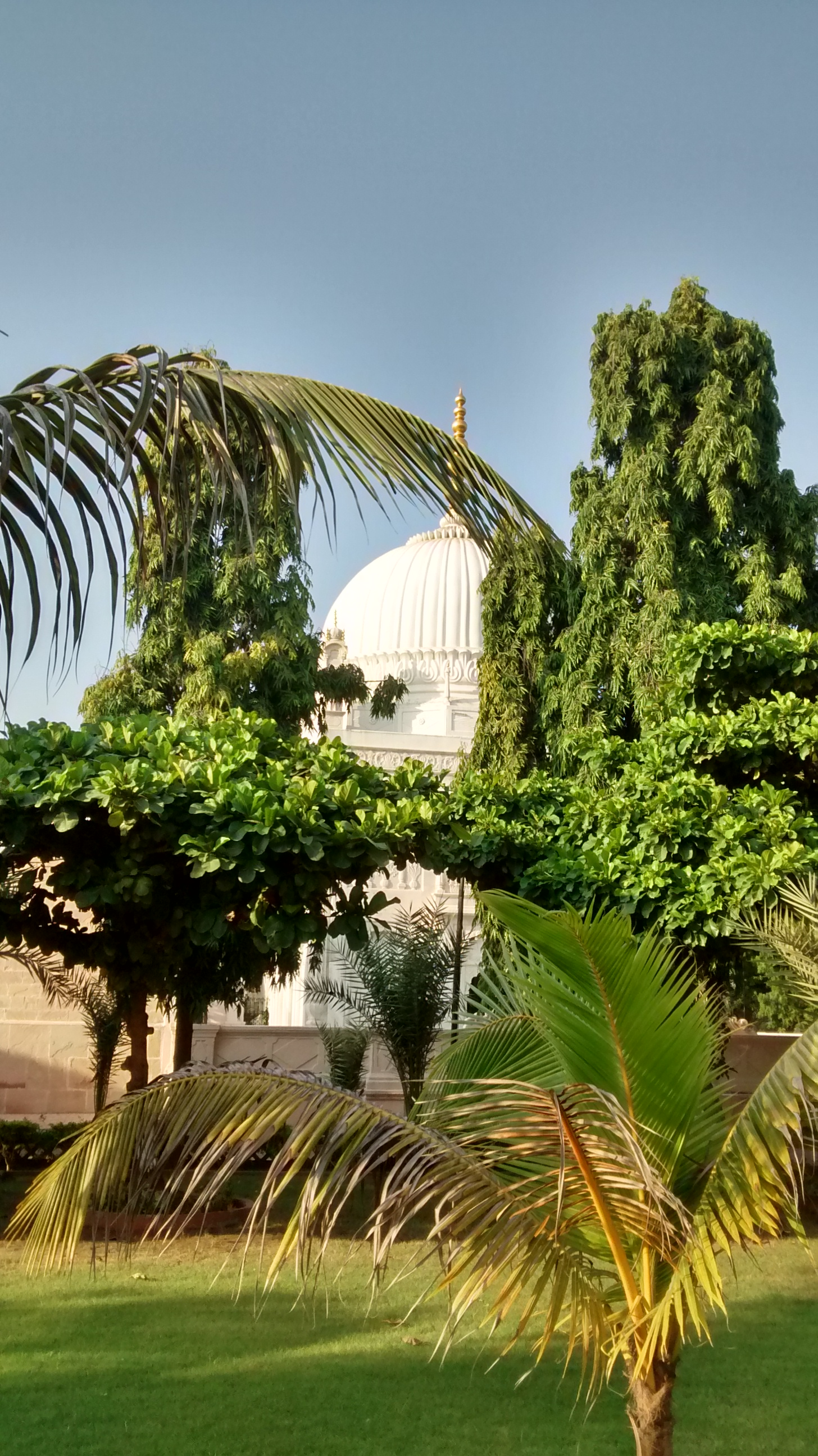
Garden Hasan Pir
