= Hebatullahil Moaiyadfiddeen =

Syedna Hebatullahil Moaiyadfiddeen 40th Da'i al-Mutlaq of the Dawoodi Bohra
- هِبَةُاللهِ المؤيد في الدّين
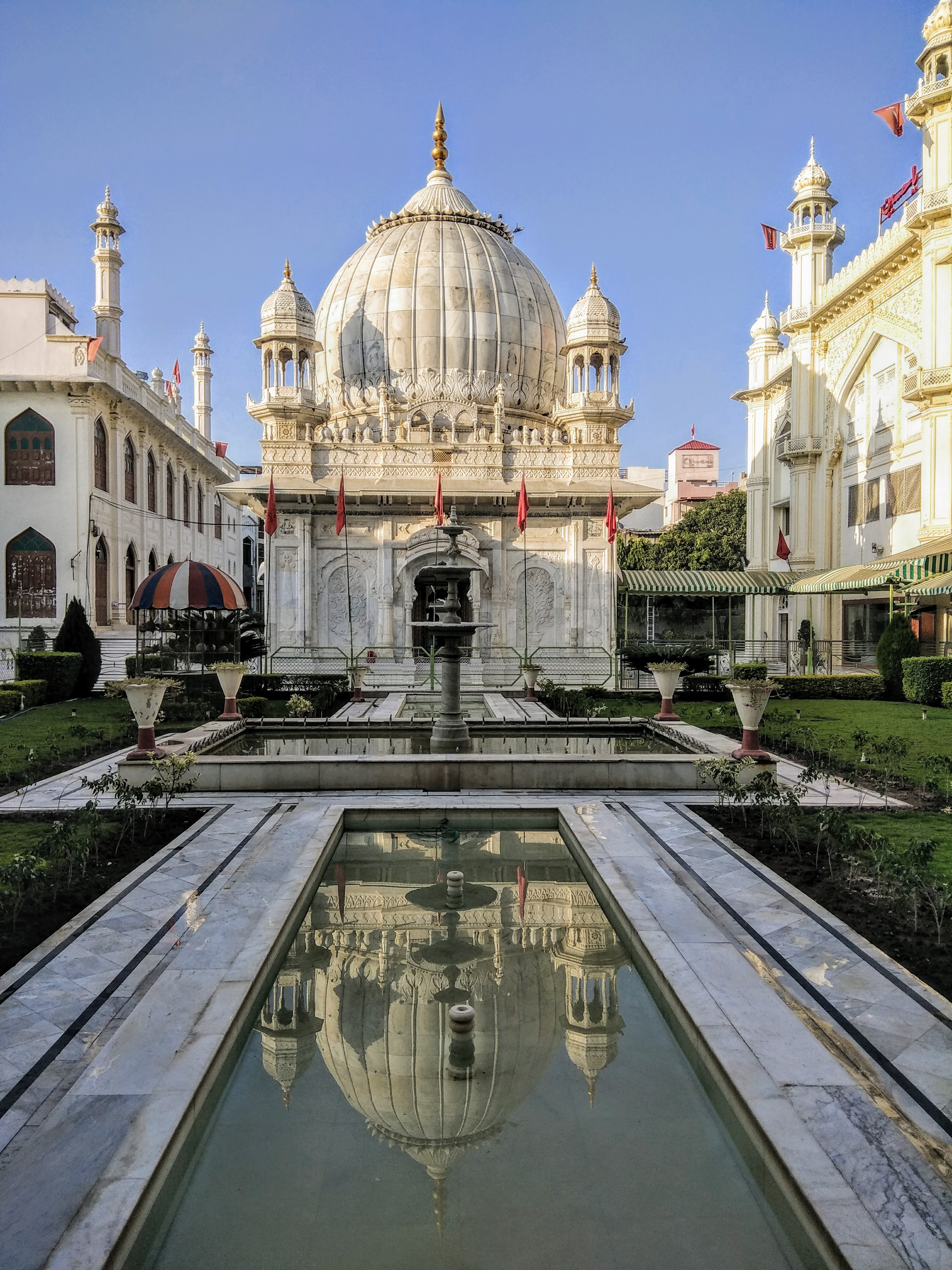
- Mazar-e-Najmi, Ujjain, where Syedna is buried.

Da'i al-Mutlaq
- In office 1756 AD (1168 AH) – 1780 AD (1200 AH)
- Preceded by: Ibrahim Wajiuddin
- Succeeded by: Abduttayyeb Zakiuddin III
- Title: Syedna; Maulana; al-Dā'ī al-Mutlaq; al-Dā'ī al-Ajal al-Fātimi

Personal life
- Born: 1713 AD
- Died: 1779 AD
- Resting place: Ujjain, India
- Children: Syedi Shamsuddin; Syedi Qamruddin
- Parent: Ibrahim Wajiuddin (father)

Religious life
- Religion: Islam
- Sect: Isma'ili; Dawoodi Bohra
- Jurisprudence: Mustaali; Tayyabi

Syedna Hebatullahil Moaiyadfiddeen bin Syedna Ibrahim Wajihuddin bin Syedi Abdul Qadir Hakimuddin bin Syedi Bawa Mulla Khan bin Syedi Habibullah (Died: 1st Shaban 1193 AH (13 August 1779 AD)) was the 40th Dā'ī al-Mutlaq of the Dawoodi Bohra sect. He succeeded his father, the 39th Dā'ī al-Mutlaq, Syedna Ibrahim Wajihuddin to the religious post.

== Life ==
Syedna Hebatullahil Moaiyadfiddeen was born in 1713 AD and was educated by his father Syedna Ibrahim Wajihuddin. He became Dā'ī in 1756 AD (1168 AH) at the age of 43. His period of Da'wat was from then until his death at the age of 68 (1780 AD (1200 AH)).

During his tenure, a group of dissidents called Hebtiyas emerged led by Ismail bin Abdurrasool and supported by Ismail's son Hebatullah.

Syedna Hebatullahil Moaiyadfiddeen had two sons; Syedi Shamsuddin and Syedi Qamruddin. Syedi Shamsuddin married the daughter of Syedi Khan Bahadur and Syedi Qamruddin married daughter of Miyansaheb Yusuf bin Faizullah.

He shares both the precise given name and the exalted honorific (laqab) of the illustrious Fatimid dāʿī (missionary), Hebatullahil Moaiyadfiddeen — famed historically as Al-Moaiyadfiddeen ush-Shirazi

Syedna Hebatullahil Moaiyadfiddeen's deputies were:

- Mawazeen: Syedi Luqmanji bin Sheikh Dawood, Syedi Khan Bahadur, Sheikh Fazal Abduttaiyyeb, Syedi Hamza
- Mukasir: Syedi Abdemoosa Kalimuddin

== Succession ==
Syedna Abduttaiyeb Zakiuddin succeeded Syedna Hebatullahil Moaiyadfiddeen as the 41st Da'i al-Mutlaq in 1780 AD (1200 AH).

== Photo gallery ==
Ujjain Dargah

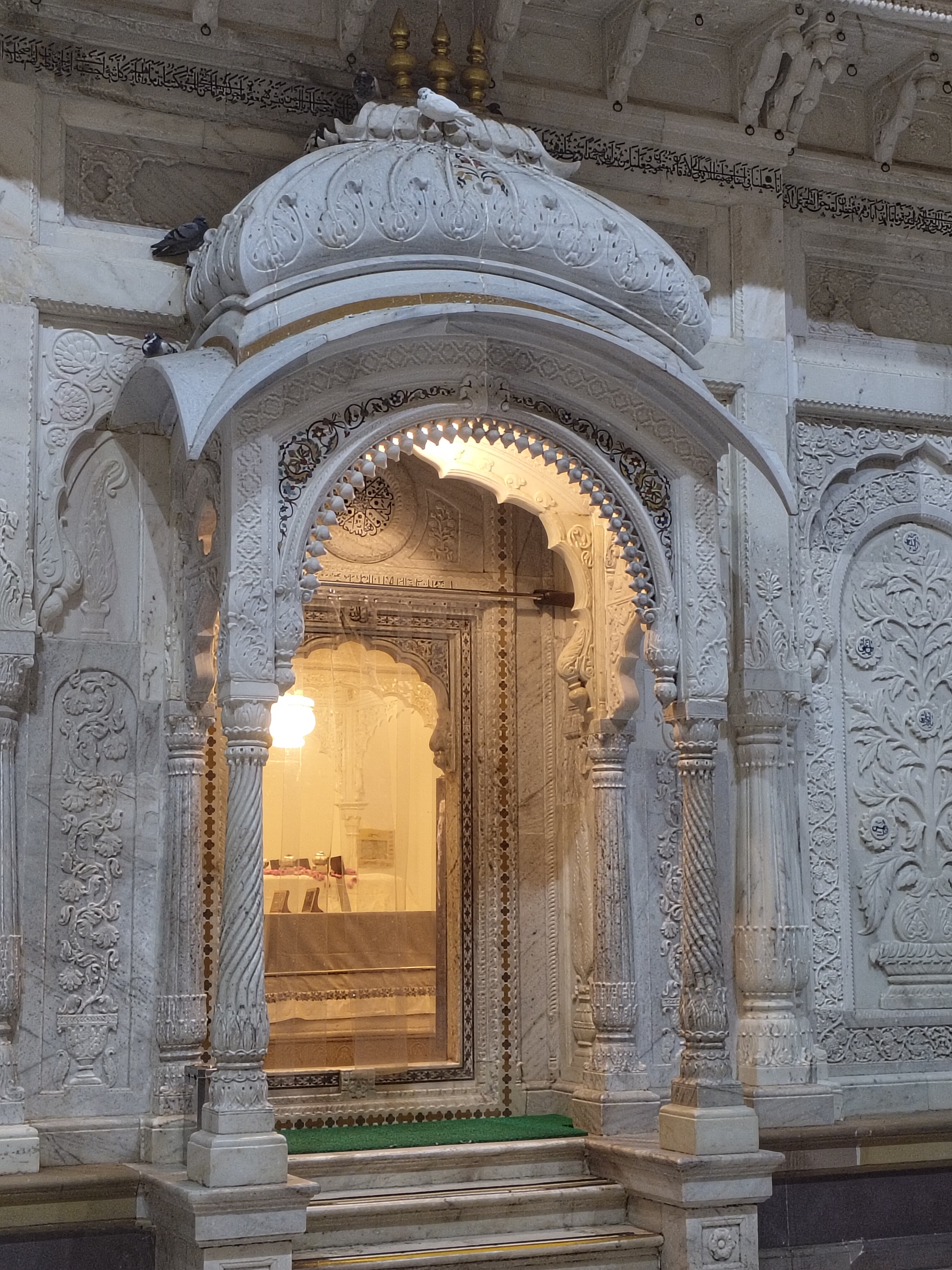
Entrance Dargah-e-Najmi

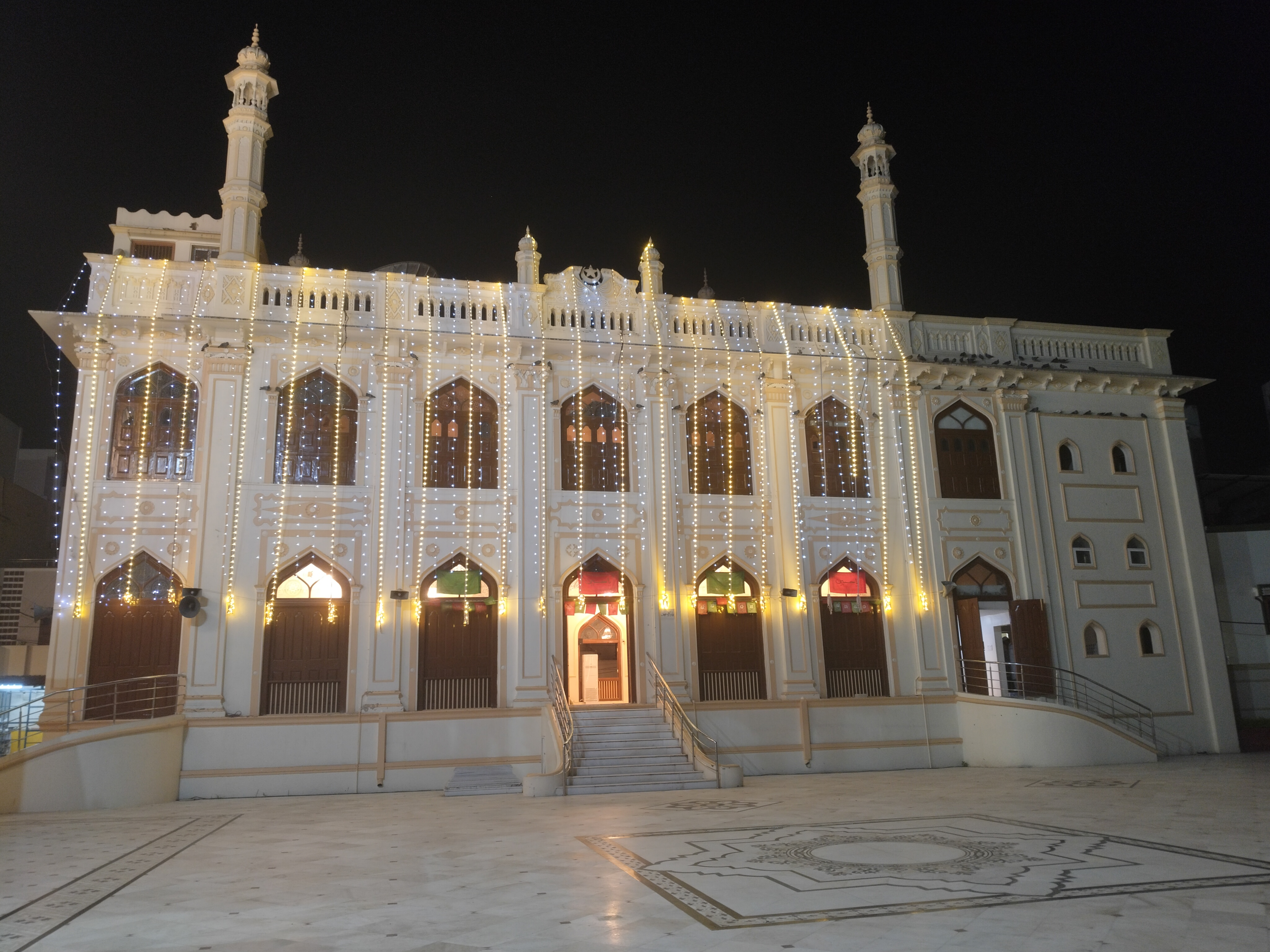
Mosque, Roja premises, Ujjain

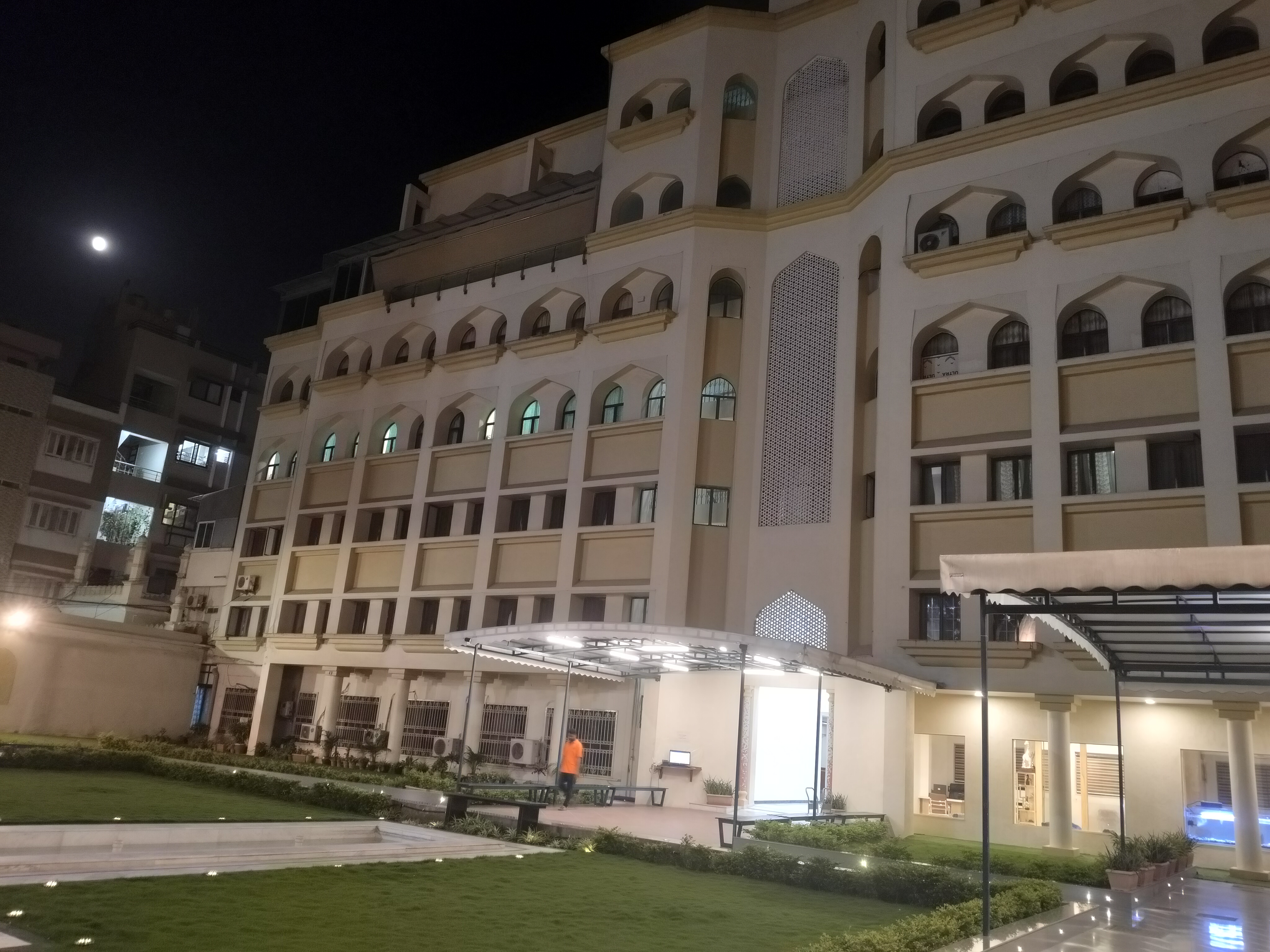
Residential accommodation facility for visitors at Dargah-e-Najmi

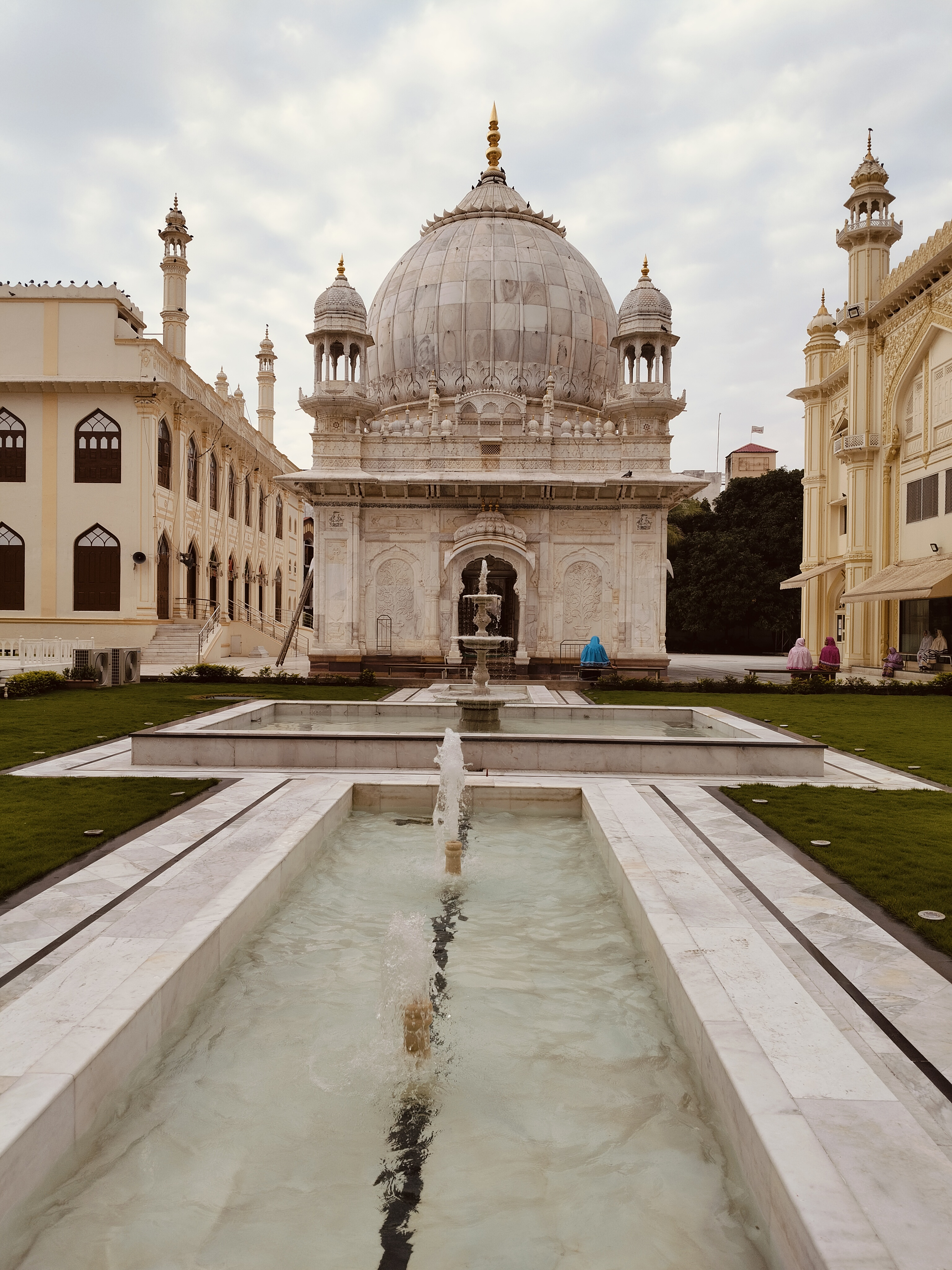
Dargah-e-Najmi, Ujjain

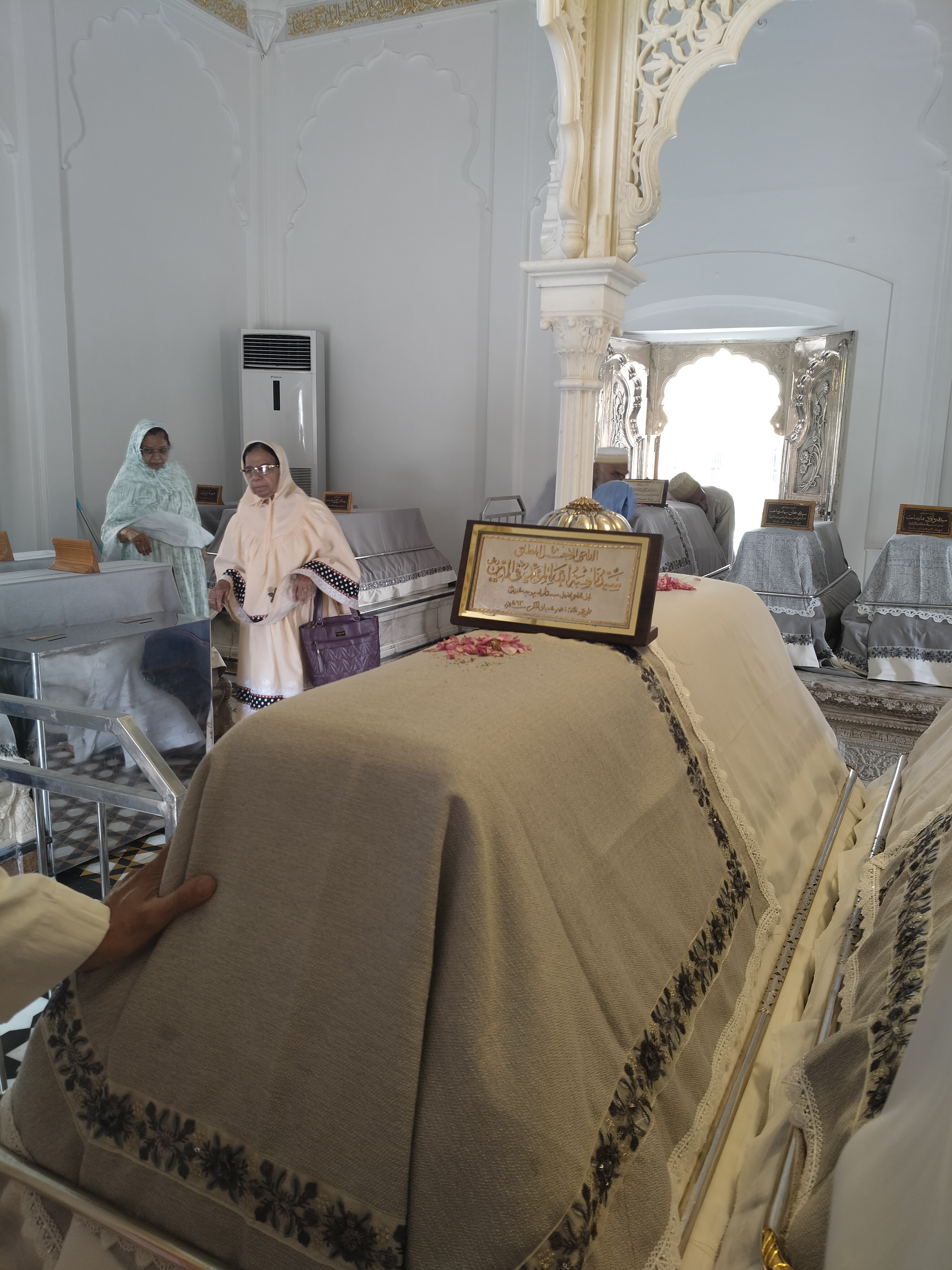
Kabr Syedna Hebatullahil Moaiyadfiddeen

Shia Islam titles
Hebatullahil Moaiyadfiddeen Dā'ī al-Mutlaq Born: 1713 AD Died: 1779 AD
Preceded by Ibrahim Wajiuddin	40th Dā'ī al-Mutlaq; 1168–1193 AH/ 1756–1780 AD	Succeeded by Abduttayyeb Zakiuddin III
