= Noor Mohammed Nooruddin =

Shia Islam ruler with delegated authority

Syedna Noor Mohammed Nooruddin 37th Da'i al-Mutlaq of the Dawoodi Bohra
- نُور مُحَمّد نورُالدّين
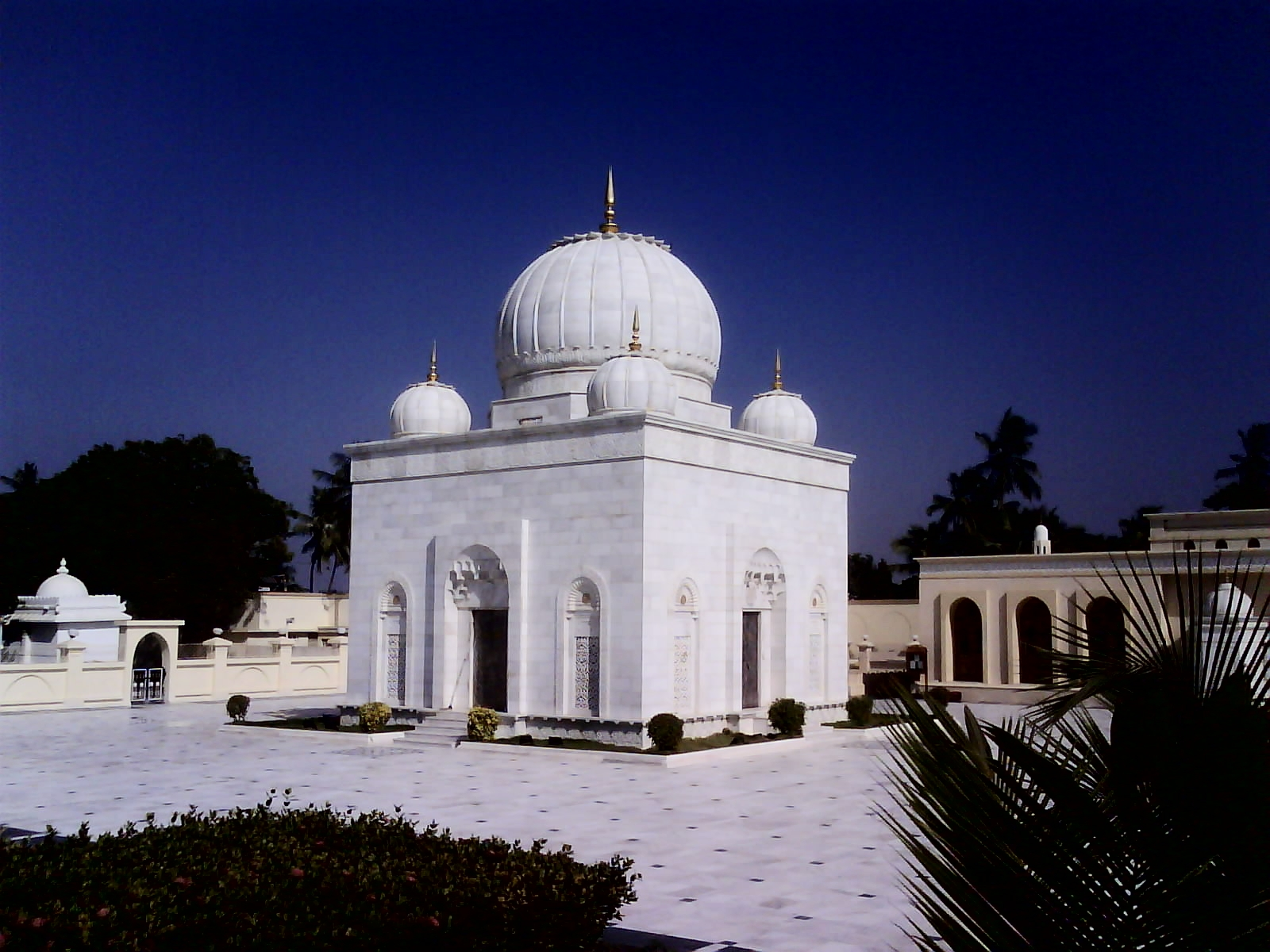
- Mazar-e-Noorani, Mandvi, where Syedna Noor Mohammed Nooruddin is buried.

Da'i al-Mutlaq
- In office 1710 AD (1122 AH) – 1719 AD (1130 AH)
- Preceded by: Musa Kalimuddin
- Succeeded by: Ismail Badruddin II
- Title: Syedna; Maulana; al-Dā'ī al-Mutlaq; al-Dā'ī al-Ajal al-Fātimi

Personal life
- Born: Jamnagar
- Died: 1719 AD Mandvi, India
- Resting place: Mandvi, India
- Spouse: Fatema AaiSaheba
- Children: Dosi Bai
- Parent: Syedna Musa Kalimuddin (father)

Religious life
- Religion: Islam
- Sect: Isma'ili; Dawoodi Bohra
- Jurisprudence: Mustaali; Tayyabi

Syedna Noor Mohammed Nooruddin (Arabic: نور محمد نور الدين) was the 37th al-Dai al-Mutlaq (vicegerent) of the Dawoodi Bohra Community, a subsect of Shia Islam.

== Early life ==
Noor Mohammad Nooruddin was born in Jamnagar in the era of his great-grandfather, the 34th Dai Syedna Ismail Badruddin I bin Mulla Raj. Syedna Zakiuddin nurtured Syedna Nooruddin and brought him up. Syedna Nooruddin served his grandfather Abduttayyeb Zakiuddin II with devotion, especially in his last illness. Before Syedna Zakiuddin died in 1110 AH/1699 AD, he bestowed Syedna Nooruddin his ring, “indicating his future accession to the rutba of Dai al-Mutlaq”. Nooruddin served his father, Musa Kalimuddin, with devotion, and aided him in conducting the Dawat. Kalimuddin entrusted him with executing all the affairs of Dawat, appointed him in the rutba of Mazoon, and made him also his Mansoos. When Kalimuddin died in 1122 AH/1710 AD, Nooruddin became Da'i al-Mutlaq.

== Jamnagar ==
The ruler of Jamnagar, the ‘Jaam’ Laakha, was against him, wanting to forcefully collect money, and forced him to leave his home and town, secretly one midnight, with only three companions (among them the 39th Dai Syedna Ibrahim Wajiuddin). It was the monsoon season, and Syedna Nooruddin walked all night in the rain. He passed through Boodri, Daruda, Wankaner and finally to Morvi, where the king of Morvi, Raja Kayaji welcomed him. Meanwhile, when the Jaam found out that Syedna Nooruddin was in Morvi, he wrote to the Raja to have him sent back, but the Raja refused. Outraged, the Jaam looted Syedna Nooruddin's home and possessions in Jamnagar.

Six months after looting Syedna Nooruddin's possessions, the ‘Jaam’ fell ill, and with his body infested with parasitic worms, he died a terrible, painful death. The ‘Jaam’ was succeeded by his son, the new Jaam Raj Singh, who was a devotee of Syedna Nooruddin. When Raj Singh was a youth, Syedna Nooruddin saved him from poison fed to him by his stepmother. Raj Singh invited Syedna Nooruddin to come back to Jamnagar. In Dhu-l-Hijja 1124 AH, Syedna Nooruddin was received by Jaam Raj Singh himself with pomp and ceremony in the presence of his full army and all communities. He returned all the possessions that his father had looted, in addition to the chit of credit for 330,000 gold Jaamis that his father had extorted.

== Mandvi ==
Some time thereafter, Jaam Raj Singh was murdered by his step-brother, who took the throne. Syedna Nooruddin did not feel safe anymore in Jamnagar, and he migrated to Mandvi, a port on the Kachchh coast, where he set up his home, and lived there for the rest of his life. His period of Dawat was 1122-1130 AH/1710-1719 AD (he died on 4 Rajab 1130). He left behind three young children under the age of eight.

== Mausoleum ==
Syedna Noor Mohammed is buried in al-Qubbah al-Nooraniyyah (Mazar-e-Noorani) in Mandvi, India. It was reconstructed with marble and inaugurated in October 1999 by Syedna Mohammed Burhanuddin. The mausoleum houses the graves of Abdulkarim bhai, Syedna Noor Mohammed Nooruddin, Fatema AaiSaheba, Phool BaiSaheba, Haleema AaiSaheba, Dosi bai, Noor bhai, Syedi Raj bhai, Sheikh AbdeMusa Meethabhai, Sheikh Ismailji, Syedi Sheikh-Adam Safiyuddin, Sheikh Shamsuddin and Rehmat bai.

== Succession ==
He was succeeded by the 38th Dai Ismail Badruddin II. Subsequent Dais from this dynasty were syedna Abduttayyeb Zakiuddin III (41), syedna Yusuf Najmuddin (42), syedna Abde Ali Saifuddin (43), and syedna Mohammed Badruddin (46). This Dynasty was descended from Molai Bharmal. The present dynasty of Dais is descended from Molai Tarmal, the brother of Molai Bharmal. The present Dynasty started from the 44th Dai syedna Mohammed Ezzuddin, then his brother syedna Tayyeb Zainuddin and his progeny. The present Dai syedna Mufaddal Saifuddin is the 6th generation direct descendant of syedna Tayyeb Zainuddin.

Shia Islam titles
Noor Mohammed Nooruddin Dā'ī al-Mutlaq Born: Jamnagar Died: 1719 AD Mandvi, India
Preceded by Musa Kalimuddin	37th Dā'ī al-Mutlaq; 1122–1130 AH/1711–1719 AD	Succeeded by Ismail Badruddin II
