= Abduttayyeb Zakiuddin III =

Syedna Abduttayyeb Zakiuddin 41st Da'i al-Mutlaq of the Dawoodi Bohra
- عَبدُالطّيب زَكيُّ الدّين
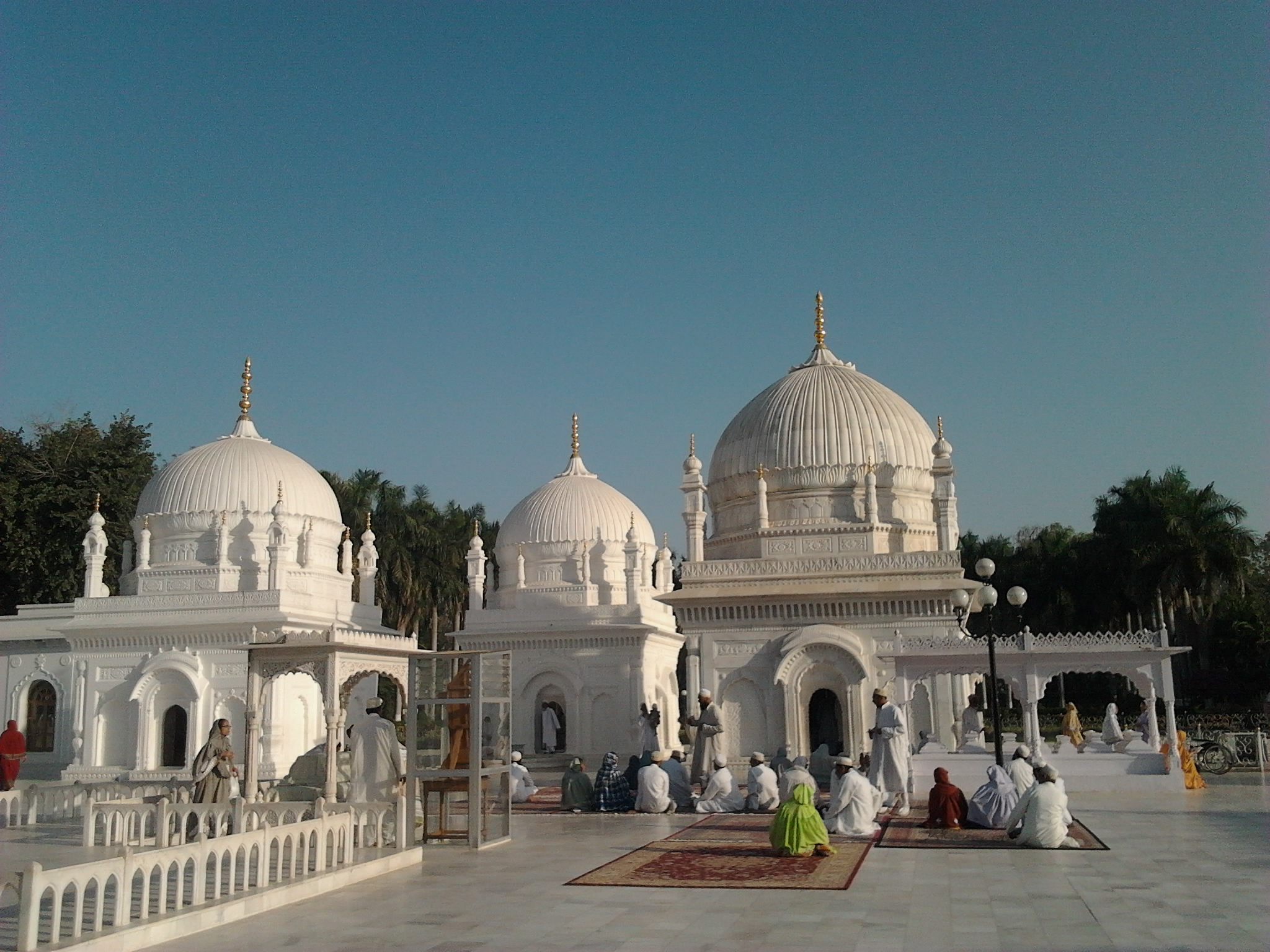
- Mausoleum of Syedna Abduttayyeb Zakiuddin in Dargah-e-Hakimi, Burhanpur

Da'i al-Mutlaq
- In office 1780 AD (1200 AH) – 1787 AD (1213 AH)
- Preceded by: Hebatullahil Moaiyadfiddeen
- Succeeded by: Yusuf Najmuddin
- Title: Syedna; Maulana; al-Dā'ī al-Mutlaq; al-Dā'ī al-Ajal al-Fātimi

Personal life
- Born: 1147 AH Wankaner
- Died: 1787 AD
- Resting place: Burhanpur, India
- Spouse: Khadija AaiSaheba; Ratan AaiSaheba
- Children: Syedna Yusuf Najmuddin; Syedna Abde Ali Saifuddin; Syedi Sheikh Adam Safiyuddin; Syedi Abdul Qadir Hakimuddin
- Parents: Ismail Badruddin II (father); Fatema AaiSaheba (mother)

Religious life
- Religion: Islam
- Sect: Isma'ili; Dawoodi Bohra
- Jurisprudence: Mustaali; Tayyabi

Syedna Abduttayyeb Zakiuddin Bin Syedna Ismail Badruddin (died on 4 Safar 1200 AH/1787 AD, Burhanpur, India) was the 41st Da'i al-Mutlaq (Absolute Missionary) of the Dawoodi Bohra sect of Ismaili Musta‘lī Islam. He succeeded the 40th Da'i Hebatullahil Moaiyadfiddeen, to the religious post.

== Family and early life ==
Syedna Abduttayyeb Zakiuddin was born in Wankaner. He was only three years of age when his father Syedna Ismail Badruddin II died. The 39th Dā'i Syedna Ibrahim Wajiuddin took him under his care. Syedna Wajiuddin gave his granddaughter Khadija AaiSaheba binte Syedna Hebatullahil Moaiyadfiddeen in marriage to Syedna Abduttayyeb Zakiuddin. After Khadija AaSaheba died, Syedna Wajiuddin gave his granddaughter Ratan AaiSaheba binte Syedi Khan BhaiSaheb in marriage to Syedna Abduttayyeb Zakiuddin. By this marriage, Syedna Abduttayyeb Zakiuddin had four sons; the 42nd Dā'i Syedna Yusuf Najmuddin, Syedna Abde Ali Saifuddin, Syedi Sheikh Adam Safiyuddin and Syedi Abdul Qadir Hakimuddin.

== Accession ==
Syedna Zakiuddin became Da'i al-Mutlaq in 1193AH/1780 AD. His period of Dawat was from 1193–1200 AH/1780–1787 AD.

His associates were: Mawazeen: Syedi Sheikh Adam Safiyuddin, Yusuf Najmuddin and Mukasir: Syedna Abdeali Saifuddin

== Succession ==
He was succeeded by the 42nd Da'i, Syedna Yusuf Najmuddin Bin Syedna Zakiuddin.

== Legacy ==
He ordered building of a Haveli (a royal palace) in Burhanpur. The Haveli was built in the royal classical Rajasthani style with exquisite carvings, and engravings. The Haveli was built in 1197 AH. Syedna Zakiuddin visited Burhanpur in 1199 AH and resided in the Haveli and then adopted Burhanpur as the Capital of Dawat.

Shia Islam titles
Abduttayyeb Zakiuddin III Dā'ī al-Mutlaq Born: 1147 AH Died: 1787 AD
Preceded by Hebatullah-il-Moayed Fiddeen	41 st Dā'ī al-Mutlaq; 1193–1200 AH/1780–1787 AD	Succeeded by Yusuf Najmuddin
