= Al-Mu'ayyad fi'l-Din al-Shirazi =

11th century Isma'ili Muslim scholar

Hibatullah ibn Musa Abu Nasr al-Mu'ayyad fi d-Din ash-Shirazi
- Born: 1000 CE / 390 AH
- Died: 1078 CE / 470 AH

Philosophical work
- Era: Medieval era
- Region: Islamic philosophy
- School: Isma'ili

Al-Mu'ayyad fid-din Abu Nasr Hibat Allah b. Abi 'Imran Musa b. Da'ud ash-Shirazi (c. 1000 CE/390 AH – 1078 CE/470 AH) was an 11th-century Isma'ili scholar, philosopher-poet, preacher and theologian of Persian origin. He served the Fatimid Caliph-Imām al-Mustansir Billah as a Da'i in varying capacities, eventually attaining the highest rank of Bab al-Abwab "The Gate of Gates" and Da'i al-du'at "Chief Missionary" in the Fatimid Da‘wah. In his theological and philosophical writings he brought the Isma'ili spiritual heritage to its pinnacle.

== Life ==
Al-Mu'ayyad was born in Shiraz not later than 387/997 and died in Cairo, Fatimid Empire in 470 AH/1078 AD. He lived during the time of the Fatimid Caliphs Al-Hakim (386–412 AH / 996–1021 AD), Al-Zahir (412–427 AH / 1021–1036 AD) and Al-Mustansir (427–48AH / 1036–1094AD). He was buried in the Dar al-ilm where he had resided, worked and died.

Al-Muayyad's real name was Hibatullah ibn Musa, born in the town of Shiraz, capital of the Fars province (then Persia, now in modern-day Iran), in the year 1000 CE. His father, Musa ibn Dawud, served under the Fatimid Caliph-Imam al-Hakim bi Amr Allah as the Chief Missionary of the province of Fars, where the Isma'ili mission was active.

During the reign of the Fatimid Caliph-Imam al-Zahir li-i'zaz Din Allah, Hibatullah ibn Musa was permitted to take over the da'wah office from his father. His title, Al-Mu'ayyad fi d-Din ('The one aided in religion') was probably accorded to him around this time.

Al-Mu'ayyad was appointed to the Diwan al-insha' (secretariat) in 440 AH / 1048 AD on a monthly salary of 1000 dinars and wrote the religious sermons (al-Majalis) for al-Yazuri (as-Sira 89–90). Al-Mu'ayyad gives us an interesting information about the presence of a Buyid Prince Abu 'Ali in the Fatimid Court (as-Siras 87).

Al-Muayyad (Hibatullah) gradually worked his way up the hierarchy of the da‘wa and was eventually appointed Chief Missionary under the Caliph-Imam al-Mustansir Billah. He was appointed the head of the Academy of Science (Dar al-'Iim, originally been founded by the Caliph al-Hakim in Cairo), which was also the headquarters of the Da'wa and became the residence of al-Mu'ayyad. He directed the Da'wa affairs throughout the Fatimid sphere of influence particularly Persia, Yemen, Bahrayn and Northern and Western India ('Uyun – ms. – fols. 59–63, 65). In this position, he worked teaching missionaries from both inside and outside the Fatimid Empire and composing his theological works until the end of his life in 1078 CE. He founded the dynamic tradition of Fatimid daʿwa ('religious mission') poetry that flourished after him for a thousand years through the succeeding Taiyabi daʿwa and continues to thrive today. His poetry uses a unique form of esoteric tāwīl-based religious symbolism – metaphor, in fact, as manifestation, where what appears to be metaphor is the theological reality of the Imam.

The primary source for details of Al-Mu'ayyad's life are his own memoirs, the Sirat al-Mu'ayyad fi d-Din, which was written in three stages between the years 1051 and 1063 CE. He is also mentioned in the works of Nasir Khusraw, another prominent Isma'ili scholar of the time, who had learned under al-Mu'ayyad. In a poem written in 455/1063 (Diwan, 173–177) Nasir praises al-Mua-yyad as his master (teacher) and refers to him as the "Warden of the Gate" ('Bab'). There are other direct references in Nasir's Diwan (313–314). Al-Mu'ayyad also taught Hassan-i Sabbah.

== Works ==
- Majalis ul-Muayyadiyah, written between 450 AH to 470 AH. Comprising eight volumes, each one hundred lectures. It deals with various theological and philosophical questions asked by people of other religions and atheists.
- Diwan ul-Muayyad, a collection of poems in praise of the Ismai'ili Imams and the doctrines of their faith
- Sirat al-Muayyad fid-Din, his autobiography
- Sarah ul-Maad, a treatise on the Day of Resurrection
- Al-Eazah watabeer fi Fazle Yoomal Ghadir, a treatise on the Ghadir Khumm incident
- Al-Ibteda wal-Inteha ('the Beginning and the End')
- Taweel ul-Arwah, a treatise on souls
- Mahajul-Ibadah, the method of devotion
- Al-Maselet-wal-Jawab ('Questions and Answers')
- Buniyad-i ta’wil, Persian translation of Asas al-ta’wil by Al-Qadi al-Nu'man

== Legacy ==
In later generations within the Isma'ili tradition, high-ranking figures were occasionally granted his exact given name (ism) and honorific title (laqab) to honor his monumental contributions to the Fatimid Da'wah. Notably, his full name and title were bestowed upon the 40th Da'i al-Mutlaq of the Dawoodi Bohra community, Syedna Hebatullahil Moaiyadfiddeen (d. 1779), the son of Syedna Ibrahim Wajihuddin.

== See also ==
- Ismailism
- Nasir Khusraw al-Qubadiani
- Imamah (Ismaili doctrine)
- Imamah (Nizari Ismaili doctrine)
- Nizari Ismailis
- Hebatullahil Moaiyadfiddeen

== Literature ==
- Verena Klemm (2003). Memoirs of a Mission: The Ismaili Scholar, Statesman and Poet, al-Mu'ayyad fi'l-Din al-Shirazi. Ismaili Heritage Series 9, London: I. B. Tauris in association with The Institute of Ismaili Studies. ISBN 978-1-86064-432-0.
- Tahera Qutbuddin (2005). Al-mu'ayyad Al-shirazi And Fatimid Da'wa Poetry: A Case of Commitment in Classical Arabic Literature. Brill Academic Publishers. ISBN 978-90-04-14103-2.
- Tahera Qutbuddin (2011). "Fatimid Aspirations of Conquest and Doctrinal Underpinnings in the Poetry of al-Qāʾim bi-Amr Allāh, Ibn Hāniʾ al-Andalusī, Amīr Tamīm b. al-Muʿizz, and al-Muʾayyad al-Shīrāzī", in Poetry and History: The Value of Poetry in Reconstructing Arab History, ed. Ramzi Baalbaki, Saleh Said Agha, and Tarif Khalidi, Beirut: American University in Beirut Press, pp. 195–246.
- Tahera Qutbuddin (2020). "al-Muʾayyad al-Shīrāzī", Encyclopaedia of Islam, 3rd ed., ed. Kate Fleet, Gudrun Krämer, Denis Matringe, John Nawas, and Devin Stewart, Leiden: Brill, print and online, part 2020–2, pp. 121–127.
- Tahera Qutbuddin (2021)."Principles of Fatimid Symbolic Interpretation (Taʾwīl): An Analysis Based on the Majālis Muʾayyadiyya of al-Muʾayyad al-Shīrāzī (d. 470/1078),” in Reason, Esotericism and Authority in Shiʿi Islam, ed. Rodrigo Adem and Edmund Hayes, in the series Shii Islam: Texts and Studies, Leiden: Brill, pp. 151–189.
- Tahera Qutbuddin (2023)."A Supplication for God's Mercy on the Day of ʿArafa by the Fatimid Chief Dāʿī al-Muʾayyad al-Shīrāzī", in Islamic Thought and the Art of Translation: Essays in Honor of William C. Chittick and Sachiko Murata, ed. Mohammad Rustom, in the series Islamic History and Civilization, Leiden: Brill, pp. 491–515.
