= Abde Ali Saifuddin =

43rd Da'i al-Mutlaq of the Dawoodi Bohra

Syedna AbdeAli Saifuddin 43rd Da'i al-Mutlaq of the Dawoodi Bohra
- عَبدِعَلي سَيفُ الدّين
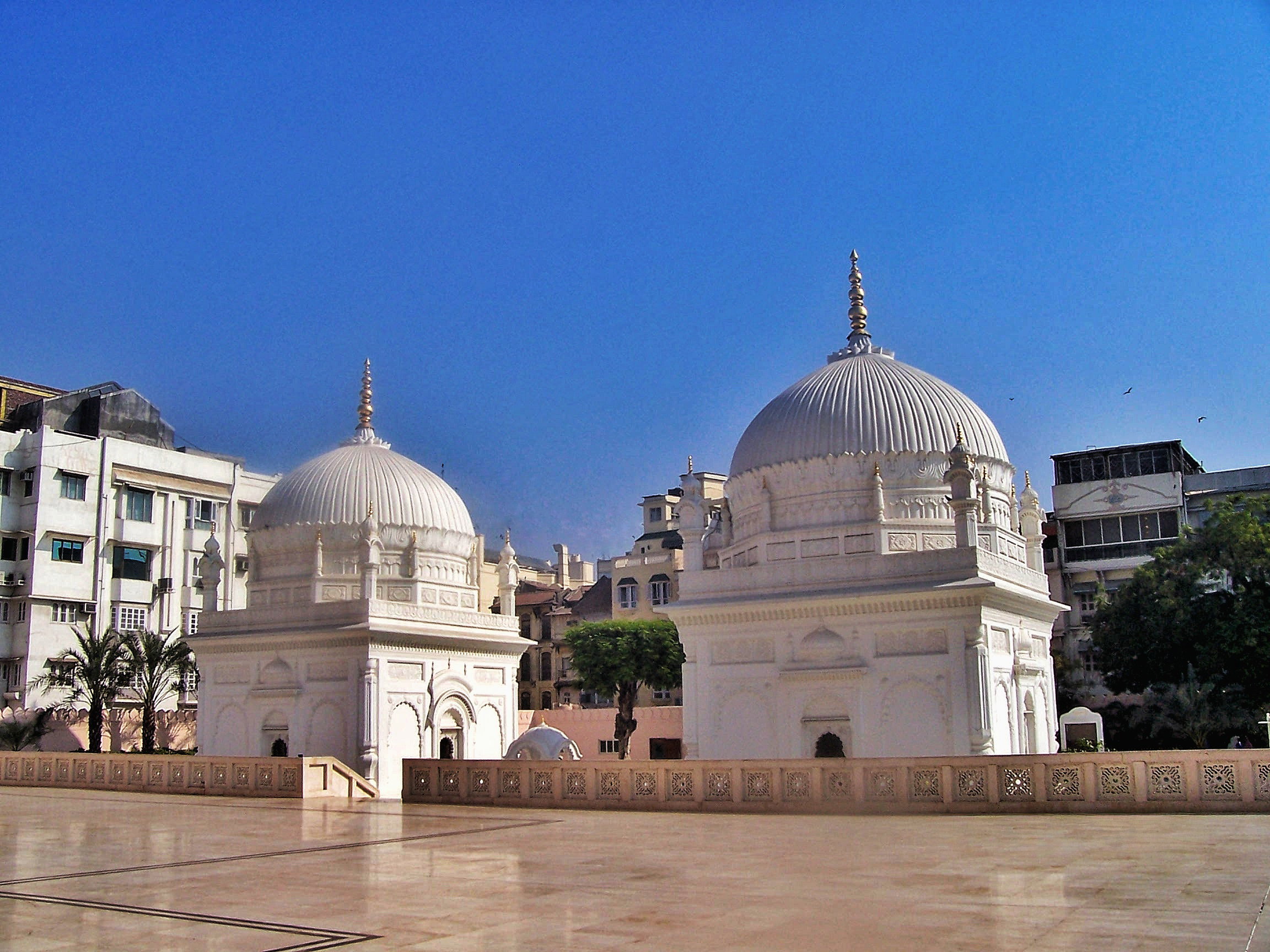
- Qubbah Najmiyyah, Mazar-e-Saifee, Surat; where Syedna Saifuddin is buried.

Da'i al-Mutlaq
- In office 1798–1817
- Preceded by: Yusuf Najmuddin
- Succeeded by: Mohammed Ezzuddin
- Title: Syedna; Maulana; Dai al-Mutlaq; al-Muayyad al-Asghar; al-Hadd al-Allamah

Personal life
- Born: AbdeAli; 14 April 1775
- Died: 23 September 1817 (aged 42) Surat, India
- Resting place: Mazar-e-Saifee, Surat, India
- Parent: Abduttayyeb Zakiuddin III (father)
- Relatives: Yusuf Najmuddin (brother)

Religious life
- Religion: Islam
- Sect: Isma'ili; Dawoodi Bohra
- Jurisprudence: Mustaali; Tayyabi

Abdeali Saifuddin was the 43rd Da'i al-Mutlaq of the Dawoodi Bohra. He was the son of 41st Da'i al-Mutlaq Abduttayyeb Zakiuddin III and the brother of the 42nd Da'i al-Mutlaq Syedna Yusuf Najmuddin. He was a Dai, scholar and poet and one of the most venerated Dawoodi Bohra Dai's.

== Life ==
He was born on 9 Safar 1188 Hijri (20 April 1774 AD), succeeded the 42nd Da'i al-Mutlaq on 18 Jumada al-Thani 1213 Hijri (28 October 1798 AD), and died on 12 Dhu al-Qi'dah 1232 Hijri (23 September 1817 AD) and is buried in al-Qubbah al-Najmiyah in Surat. He was only twelve when his father died. He was then brought up by his elder brother Syedna Yusuf Najmuddin in Surat. Syedna Najmuddin himself was a great scholar. He trained and educated Abde Ali Saifuddin in the tradition and learning that was the treasured inheritance of the Fatimid-Ismaili community.

The era of Syedna Abde Ali Saifuddin was witness to intense intellectual activity. Many scholars were actively involved in the spread of knowledge throughout this period. They were the disciples of Syedna Abde Ali Saifuddin: Syedi Sadiq Ali Saheb used poetry to explain articles of faith; Syedi Abde Ali Imaduddin penned haqiqat in his eloquent verses; Syedi Shaikh Ibrahim Saifee composed a book about the laws of nikah; Syedi Shaikh Qutubuddin specialized in writing the history of Aimmat Tahereen (SA) and Duat Mutlaqeen (RA).

== Legacy ==
- He built the educational institute Al-Dars-al-Saifee in 1224 Hijri (later renamed Aljamea-tus-Saifiyah by Syedna Taher Saifuddin). The cost of the madrasah was 65,000 rupees, and Syedna Abde Ali Saifuddin (RA) built it from his personal funds.
- He built the al-Masjid al-Moazzam in Surat in 1219 Hijri, which was later renovated by Syedna Mohammed Burhanuddin in 1417 Hijri.
- During the Indian famines of 1813 (1228 Hijri), 12,000 Dawoodi Bohras traveled to Surat where he housed, fed, maintained and uplifted them at his own expense. Not only did he take care of their food and shelter but provided them with tools so that they could practice their craft and earn money. The earnings were deposited with a committee formed by Syedna (RA). After eleven months, the mumineen returned to their hometowns and the deposited amount was handed over to them.
- He made an important contribution to the development of Arabic in South Asia by developing a methodology which enabled students to quickly become proficient in Arabic. He was referred to by his contemporaries as al-Moiyed al-Asghar (the second Moiyed) after the famous Isma'ili scholar and poet Mu'ayyad fi'l-Din al-Shirazi.
- His major contributions consist of systemizing the machinery of the Da'wah, including formalizing the curriculum and setting out the rules and regulations of the Dawoodi Bohra teachings.
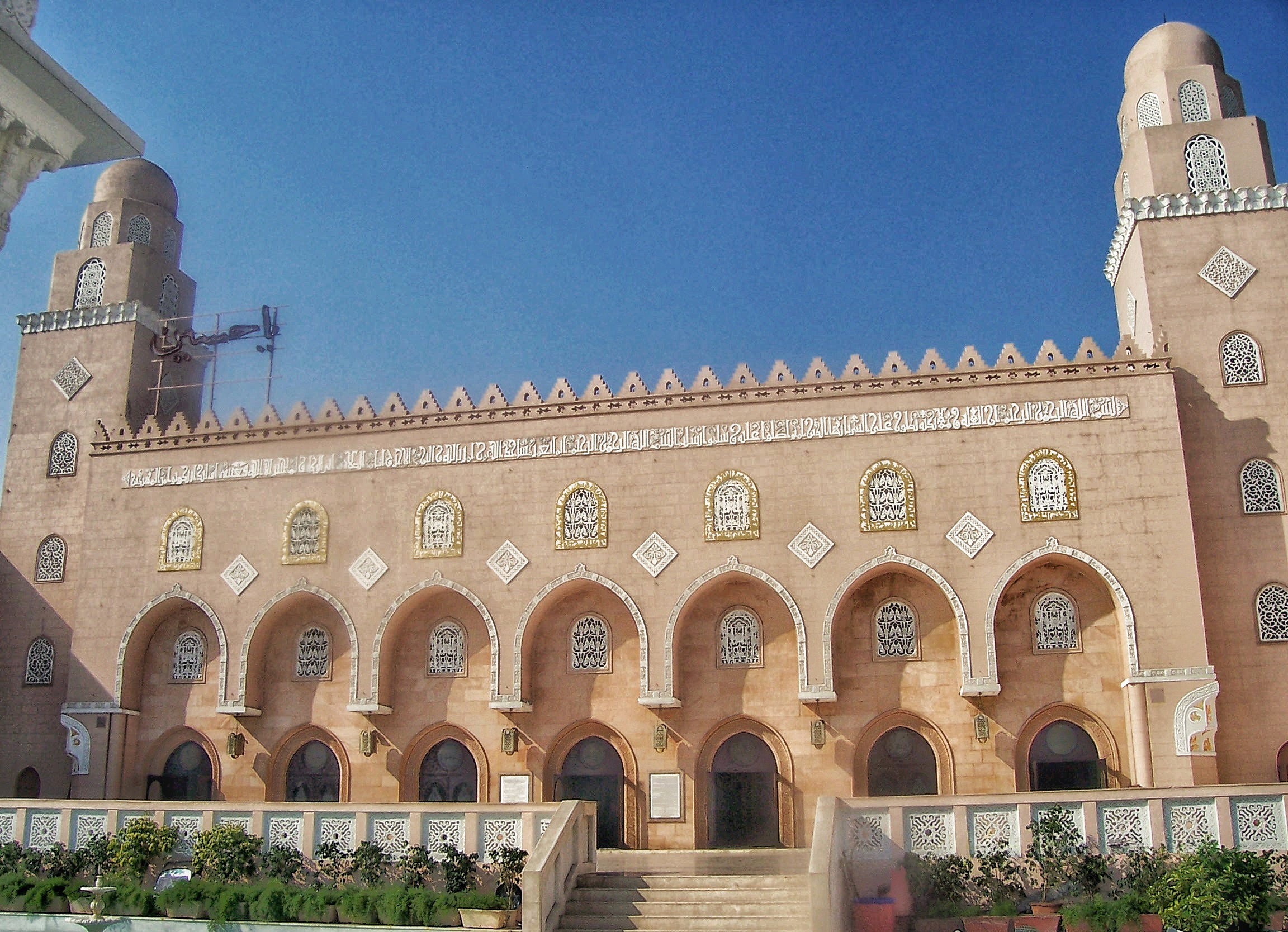

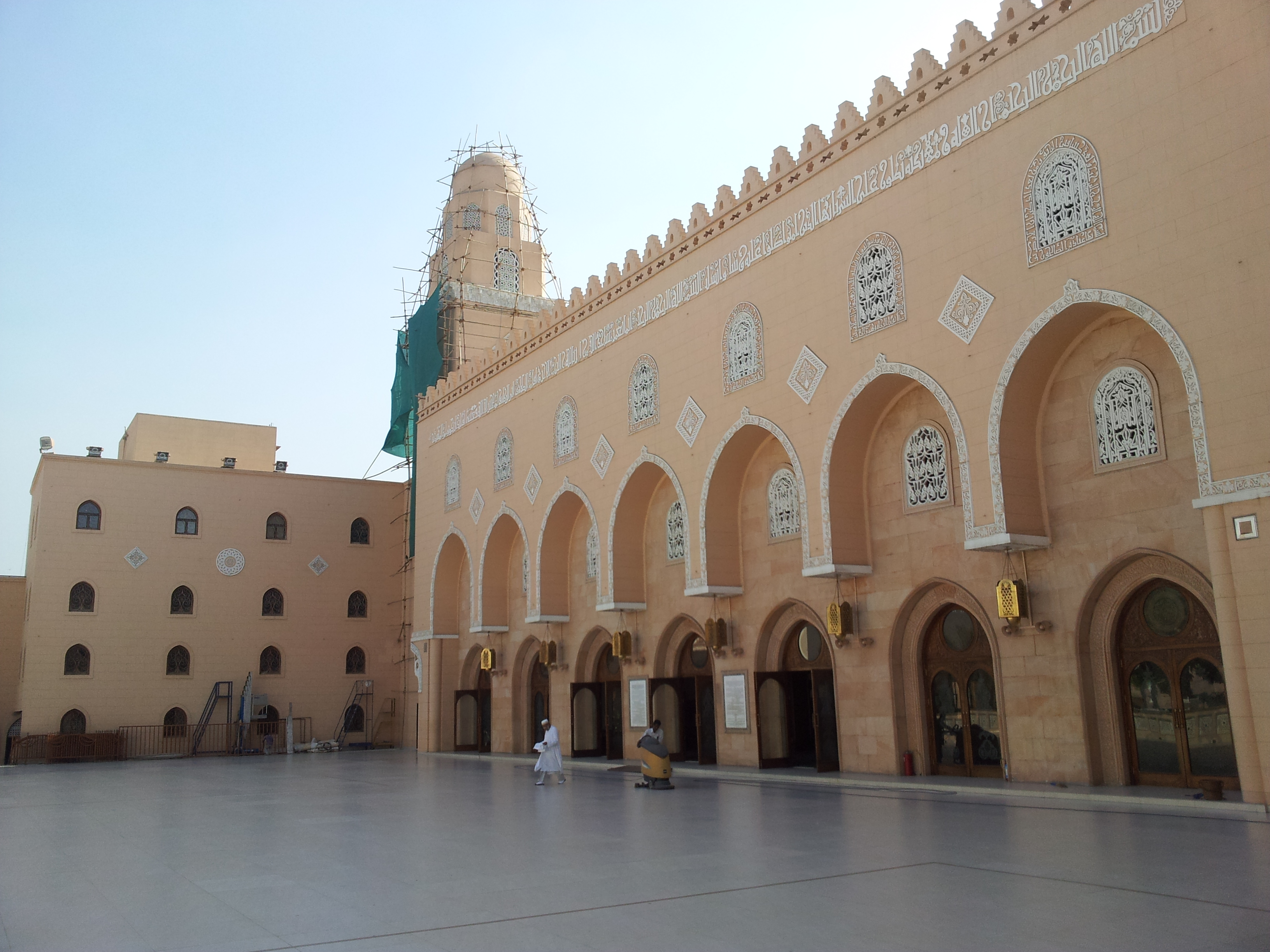
Masjid-e-Moazzam in Surat built by Syedna Saifuddin; later renovated by Mohammed Burhanuddin.

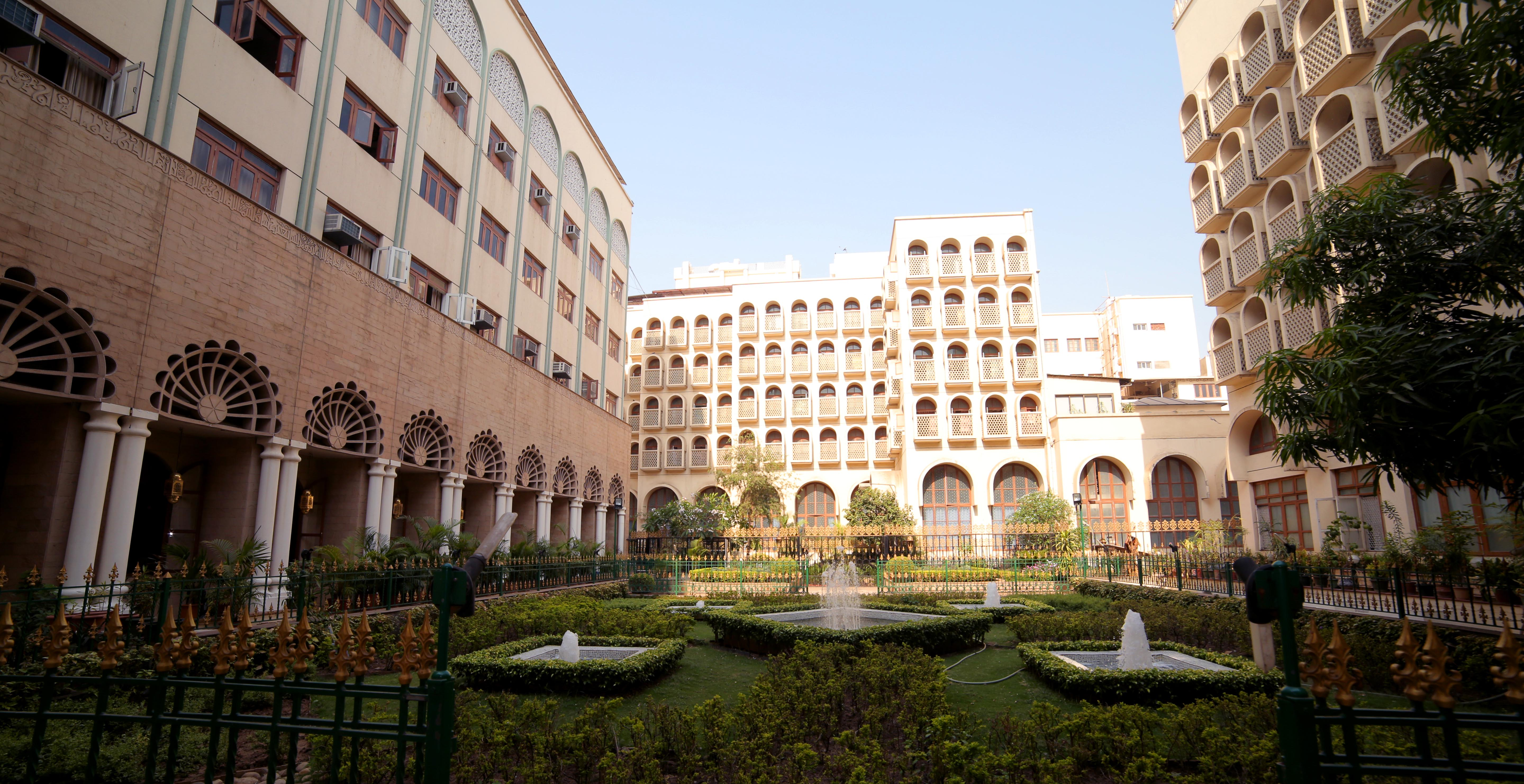
Al-Dars-al-Saifee (Now Aljamea-tus-Saifiyah) in Surat was established by Abdeali Saifuddin.

== Works ==
His Diwan of poetry, compiled by his student Abdeali Imaduddin, comprises over 500 poems in Arabic and is an integral part of the curriculum at Al Jamea tus Saifiyah. He also composed the famous work "Ilm na moti jaro" (Arabic: علم نا موتي جرو) in Lisan al-Dawat which is memorized by every single Dawoodi Bohra member.

He penned a series of epistles known as the al-Rasail al-Saifiyah. The Isma'il books such as Muntaza' al-Akhbar and Kitab al-Najah were written under his directives.

== Death ==
Syedna (RA) chose Syedna Mohammed Ezzuddin as his successor and prepared him to shoulder the responsibility of dawat. Syedna Abde Ali Saifuddin (RA), troubled by ill health died on Monday, the 12th of Zilqad, in 1232 AH at a young age of 43 years. (23 September 1817 AD)

Shia Islam titles
Abde Ali Saifuddin Dā'ī al-Mutlaq Born: 14 April 1775 Died: 23 September 1817
| Preceded by Yusuf Najmuddin | 43rd Da'i al-Mutlaq; 1213–1232 AH/1799–1817 AD | Succeeded by Mohammed Ezzuddin |
