= Musa Kalimuddin =

Syedna Musa Kalimuddin 36th Da'i al-Mutlaq of the Dawoodi Bohra
- موسى كليمُ الدّين

Da'i al-Mutlaq
- In office 1692 AD (1103 AH) – 1710/1711 AD (1122 AH)
- Preceded by: Abduttayyeb Zakiuddin II
- Succeeded by: Noor Mohammad Nooruddin
- Title: Syedna; Maulana; al-Dā'ī al-Mutlaq; al-Dā'ī al-Ajal al-Fātimi

Personal life
- Died: 1710/1711 AD
- Resting place: Jamnagar, India
- Children: Noor Mohammad Nooruddin
- Parents: Syedna Abduttayyeb Zakiuddin (father); Fatema AaiSaheba (mother)

Religious life
- Religion: Islam
- Sect: Isma'ili; Dawoodi Bohra
- Jurisprudence: Mustaali; Tayyabi

Syedna Musa Kalimuddin Bin Syedna Zakiuddin (died on 22 Rabi ul Akhir 1122 AH/June 20, 1710/1711), Jamnagar, India) was the 36th Da'i al-Mutlaq (Absolute Missionary) of the Dawoodi Bohra sect of Islam. He succeeded the 35th Da'i Syedna Abduttayyeb Zakiuddin, to the religious post. His period of Dawat was from 1103–1122 AH/ 1692–1711 AD.

== Family ==
Syedna Musa was born during the tenure of Syedna Ismail Badruddin I to Syedna Abduttayyeb Zakiuddin II and Fatema AaiSaheba. His brother was Syedi Shaikh Adam Safiyuddin and his son Syedna Noor Mohammad Nooruddin was his successor. Syedna Musa Kalimuddin was from the Moulaya Tarmal/Bharmal family.

== Life ==
Syedna Ismail Badruddin I imparted knowledge to Syedna Musa. Syedna Musa was later educated in the religious institution headed by Syedi Khanji Feer. Syedna Musa played an active role in administration after his father succeeded as Dai.

Syedna Musa Kalimuddin became Da'i al-Mutlaq in 1110 AH /1692 AD.

He was extremely distressed due to harassment of the ruler of Jamnagar which made his health deteriorate rapidly.

== Succession ==
He appointed Syedna Noor Mohammad Nooruddin as his successor in Ahmedabad during his visit and also at his deathbed.

He is buried in Jamnagar, India.

Shia Islam titles
Musa Kalimuddin Dā'ī al-Mutlaq Born: - Died: 1710/1711 AD Jamnagar
| Preceded by Abduttayyeb Zakiuddin II | 36th Dā'ī al-Mutlaq; 1110–1122 AH/1692–1711 AD | Succeeded by Noor Mohammad Nooruddin |
