= Yusuf Najmuddin =

Syedna Yusuf Najmuddin 42nd Da'i al-Mutlaq of the Dawoodi Bohra
- يُوسُف نَجمُ الدّين
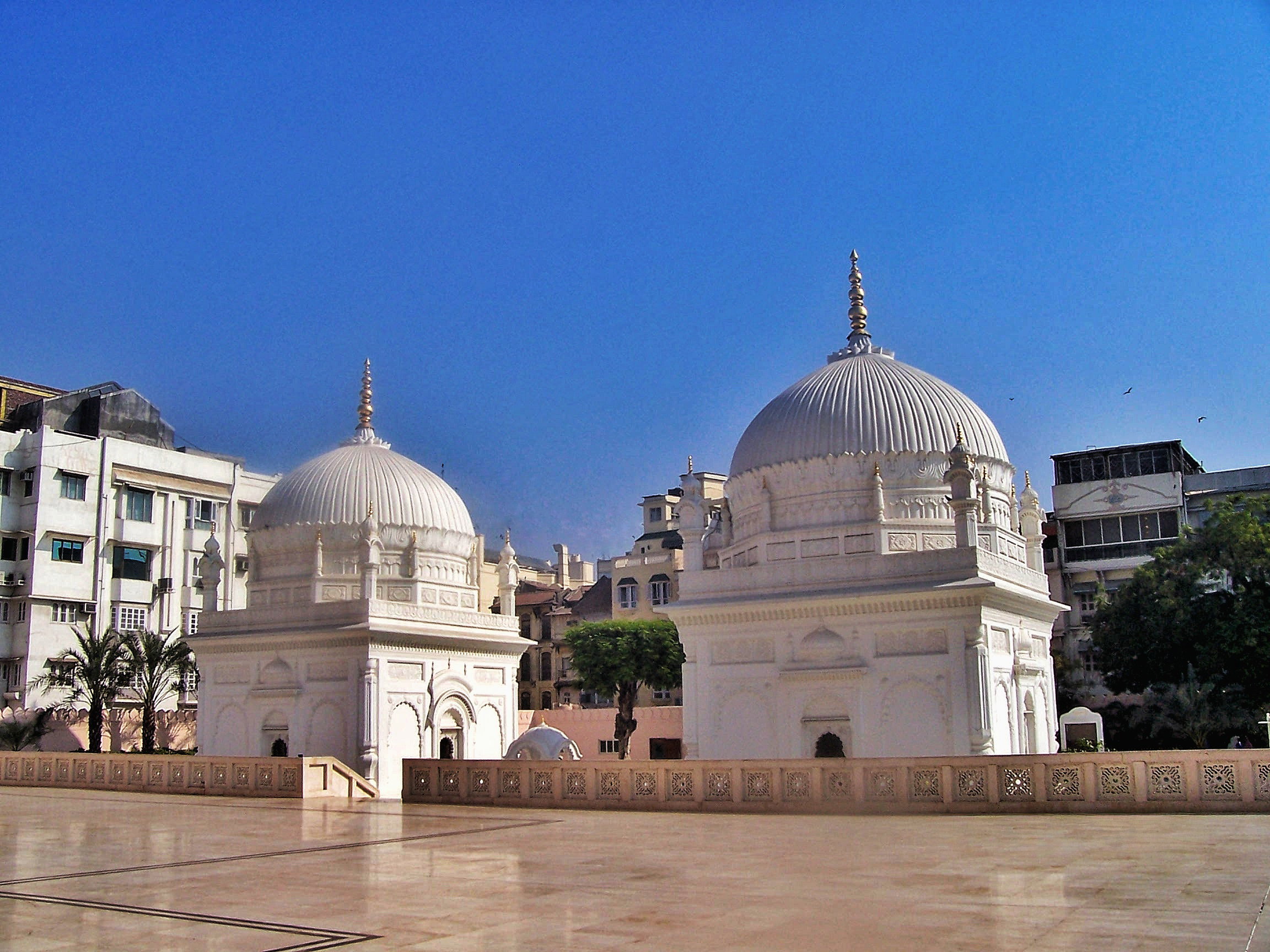
- The mausoleum Qubbah Najmiyyah at Mazar-e-Saifee, Surat; where Syedna Yusuf Najmuddin is buried.

Da'i al-Mutlaq
- In office 1787 AD (1200 AH) – 1799 AD (1213 AH)
- Preceded by: Abduttayyeb Zakiuddin III
- Succeeded by: Abde Ali Saifuddin
- Title: Syedna; Maulana; Dai al-Mutlaq; al-Allamah al-Nahreer

Personal life
- Born: 1764 AD
- Died: 27 November 1798 Surat, India
- Resting place: Mazar-e-Saifee, Surat, India
- Spouse: Manak AaiSaheba
- Children: Zainab Baisaheba; Hawwa Baisaheba
- Parents: Abduttayyeb Zakiuddin Bin Badruddin (father); Ratan AaiSaheba binte Syedi Khan BhaiSaheb (mother)

Religious life
- Religion: Islam
- Sect: Isma'ili; Dawoodi Bohra
- Jurisprudence: Mustaali; Tayyabi

Syedna Yusuf Najmuddin Bin Syedna Zakiuddin (Arabic: يوسف نجم الدين) (died on 18 Jumadil Ukhra 1213 AH/27 November 1798 AD, Surat, India) was the 42nd Da'i al-Mutlaq (Absolute Missionary) of the Dawoodi Bohra sect of Musta‘lī Islam. He succeeded the 41st Da'i Abduttayyeb Zakiuddin Bin Badruddin, to the religious post.

== Family and early life ==
He was born in Jamnagar in 1764 AD and was tutored by his father Syedna Abduttayyeb Zakiuddin Bin Badruddin. His mother was Ratan Aai Saheba binte Syedi Khan Bhaisaheb. He had three brothers: Syedna Abde Ali Saifuddin, Syedi Sheikh Adam Safiyuddin and Syedi Abdul Qadir Hakimuddin.

He married Manak Aai Saheba, daughter of Shaikh Mitha bhai bin Shaikh Adam Safiyuddin bin Syedna Nooruddin. By this marriage, Syedna Yusuf had two daughters, Zainab Baisaheba and Hawwa Baisaheba.

== Accession ==
Syedna Yusuf Najmuddin became Da'i al-Mutlaq in 1200 AH at the age of 23. His period of Dawat was from 1200-1213 AH (1787-1799 AD). In 1204 AH, he visited Ahmedabad and initiated restoration of graves and mausoleums of previous Dais. In 1207 AH, he visited Dongam, where he erected a mausoleum of Syedi Nooruddin. On route to Surat, he briefly stayed in Pune during the tenure of Peshwa Madhavrao II.

During his time in office, the Da'wat office shifted from Burhanpur to Surat.

== Death ==
Syedna Yusuf died at the age of 36. He was the seventh Dai from the lineage of Maula Raja bin Maula Ali of the Bharmal clan. His grave is located in Qubba Najmiyah, Mazar-e-Saifee in Surat.

Shia Islam titles
Yusuf Najmuddin Dā'ī al-Mutlaq Born: 1764 AD Died: 27 November 1798
Preceded by Abduttayyeb Zakiuddin III	42nd Dā'ī al-Mutlaq; 1200-1213 AH (1787-1799 AD)	Succeeded by Abde Ali Saifuddin
