= Ibrahim Wajihuddin =

18th-century Dā'ī of Dawoodi Bohras

Syedna Ibrahim Wajihuddin 39th Da'i al-Mutlaq of the Dawoodi Bohra
- اِبراهيم وَجِيهُ الدّين
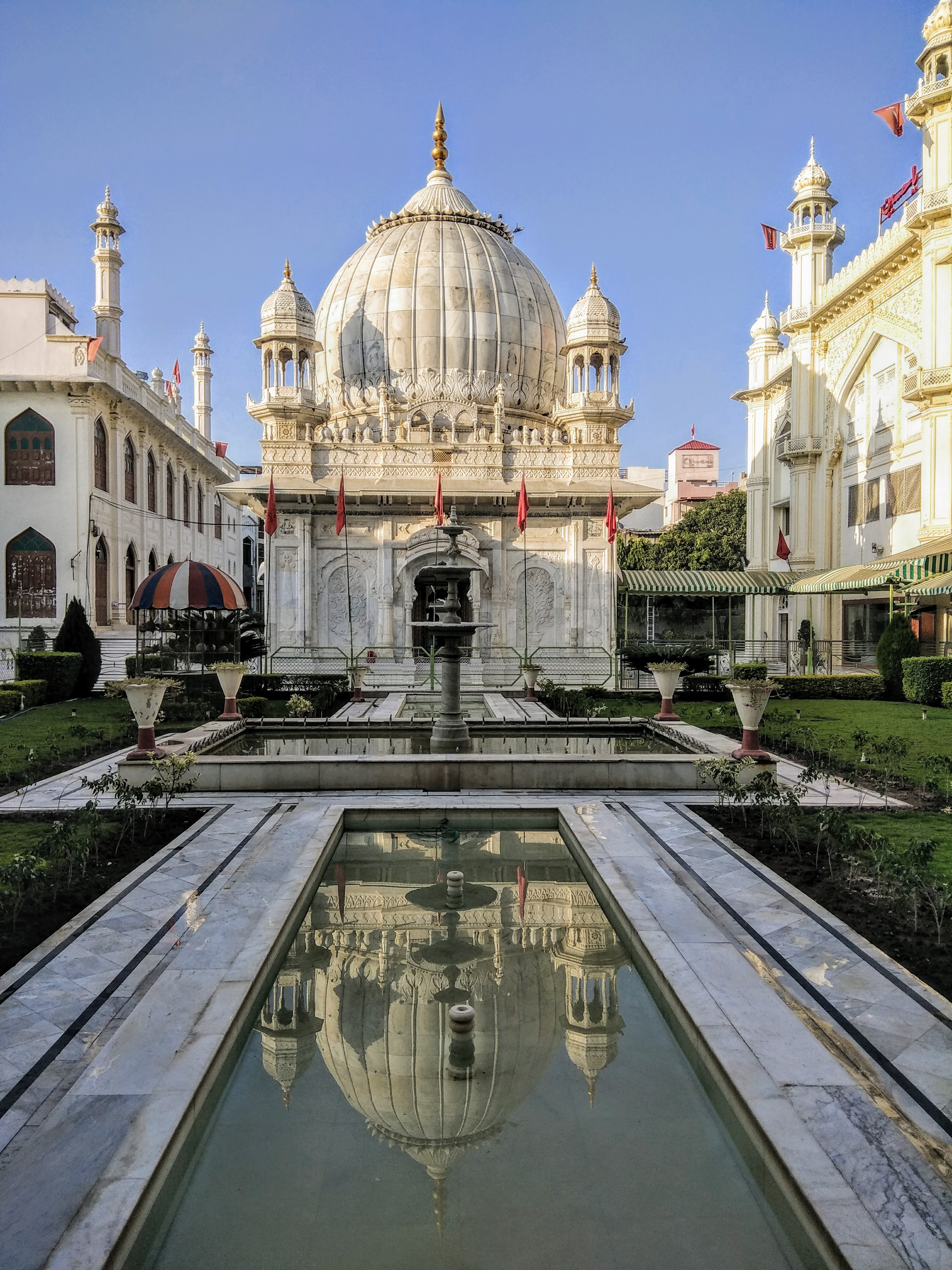
- Mazar-e-Najmi, Ujjain, where Syedna Wajihuddin is buried.

Da'i al-Mutlaq
- In office 1738 AD (1150 AH) – 1756 AD (1168 AH)
- Preceded by: Ismail Badruddin II
- Succeeded by: Hebatullahil Moaiyadfiddeen
- Title: Syedna; Maulana; al-Dā'ī al-Mutlaq; al-Dā'ī al-Ajal al-Fātimi

Personal life
- Born: 1690 AD
- Died: 1756 AD Ujjain, India
- Resting place: Ujjain, India
- Children: Hebatullahil Moaiyadfiddeen
- Parent: Abdul Qadir Hakimuddin (father)

Religious life
- Religion: Islam
- Sect: Isma'ili; Dawoodi Bohra
- Jurisprudence: Mustaali; Tayyabi

Syedna Ibrahim Wajihuddin Bin Syedi Abdul Qadir Hakimuddin (died on 17 Moharram 1168 AH/1756 AD, Ujjain, India) was the 39th Dā'ī of the Dawoodi Bohras. He succeeded the 38th Dā'ī Syedna Ismail Badruddin II to the religious post.

== Life ==
Syedna Ibrahim was born in 1690. He procured his initial education from his father, Syedi AbdulQadir Hakimuddin. At the young age of twenty-one, Syedna Vajihuddin was sent by his father for the Khidmat (service) of the Dai. He served Syedna Musa Kalimuddin and Syedna Noor Mohammed Nooruddin in the most adverse of times.

In 1143H, Ujjain was affected by a severe drought. Followers of different religions prayed for rain but in vain. Syedna Vajihuddin along with the Mumineen (faithful) proceeded to the banks of river Sipra and prayed to Allah for rain. On conclusion of his prayers, the people of Ujjain were indeed relieved as it soon started raining heavily.

Syedna Ibrahim Wajihuddin became Da'i al-Mutlaq in 1150AH/1738AD. His period of Dawat was from 1150-1168 AH/1738-1756 AD.

He was succeeded by his son, the 40th Dai Syedna Hebatullahil Moaiyadfiddeen after he died at the age of 58.

His associates/deputies were:

- Mawazeen: Sheikh Adam bin Syedna Nooruddin, Syedna Hebatullahil Moaiyadfiddeen
- Mukasir: Ali bin Phirji

The Hebtiahs Bohra were a branch of Mustaali Ismaili Shi'a Islam that broke off from the mainstream Dawoodi Bohra after the death of Syedna Ibrahim Wajihuddin in 1754. See Hebtiahs Bohra.

== Mazar-e Najmi ==
Syedna Ibrahim Wajihuddin along with two other Du'āt; Syedna Hebatullahil Moaiyadfiddeen and Syedna AbdulQadir Najmuddin are buried in this Mausoleum located at Qamari Marg, Ujjain, India.

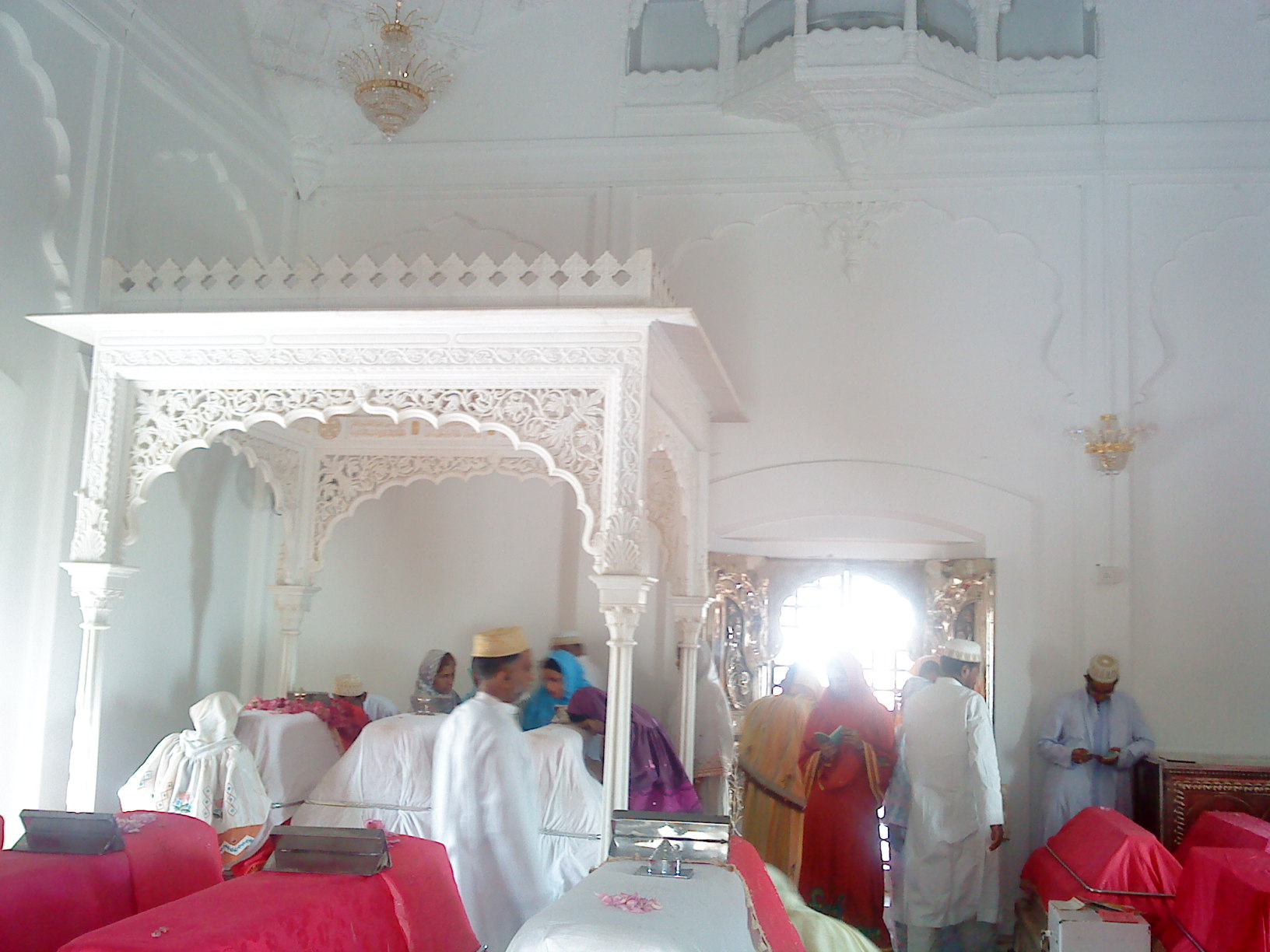
Interior of the Mausoleum. The chhatri (elevated pavilion/canopy) indicates the burial place of the three Du'āt.

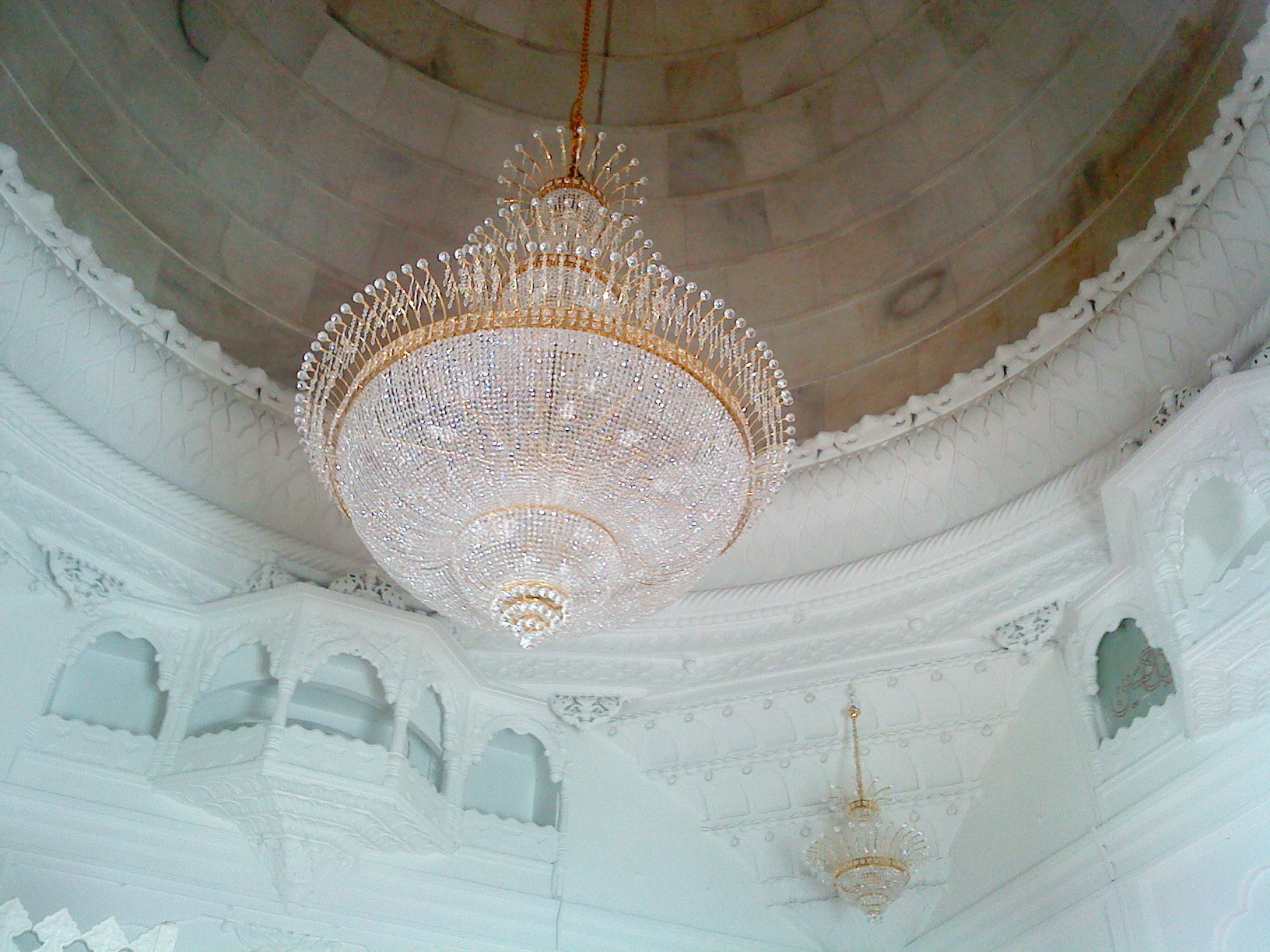
Ceiling/intrados of the dome of the Roza (Mausoleum).

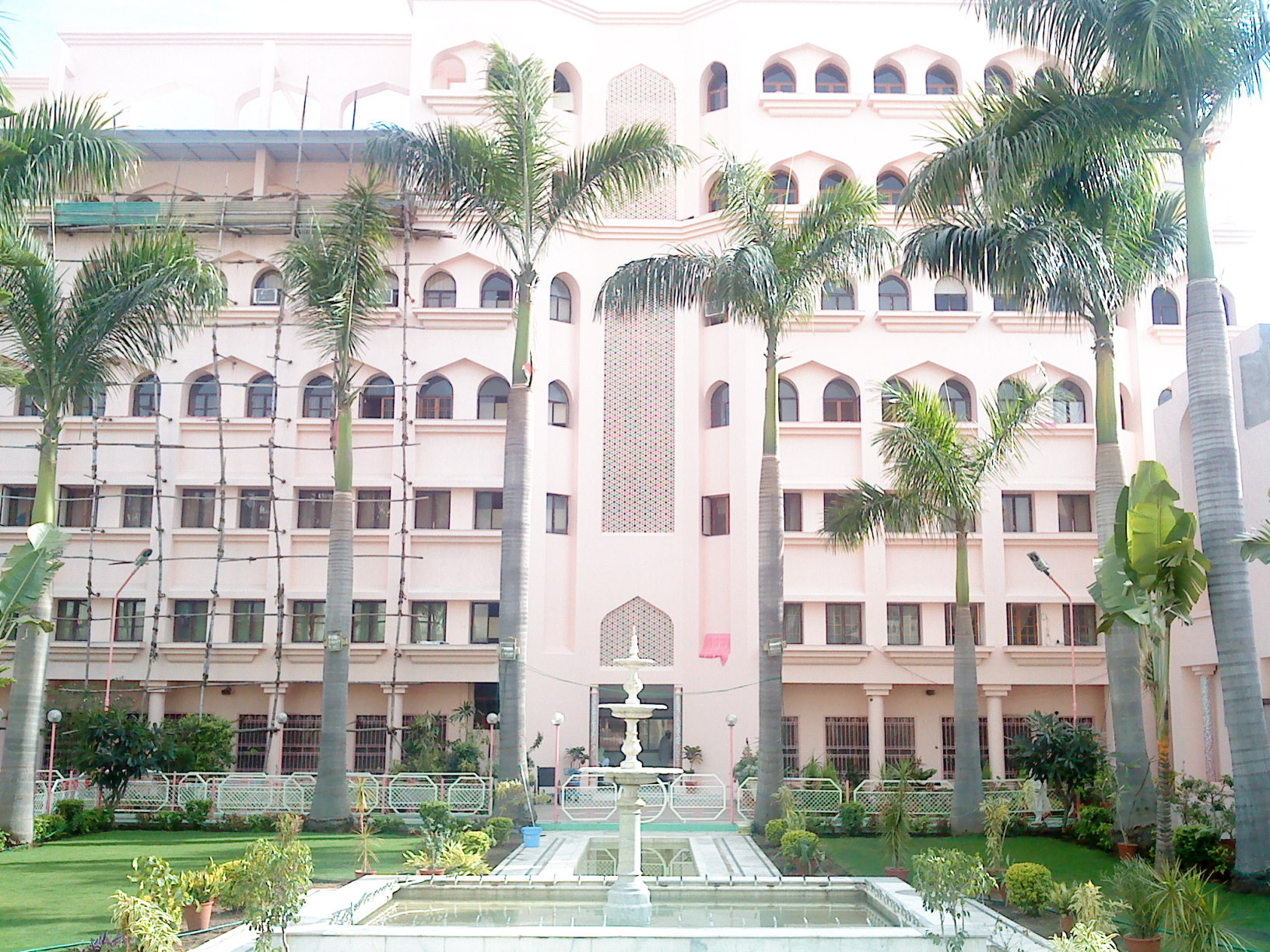
Residential complex for visitors at Ujjain.

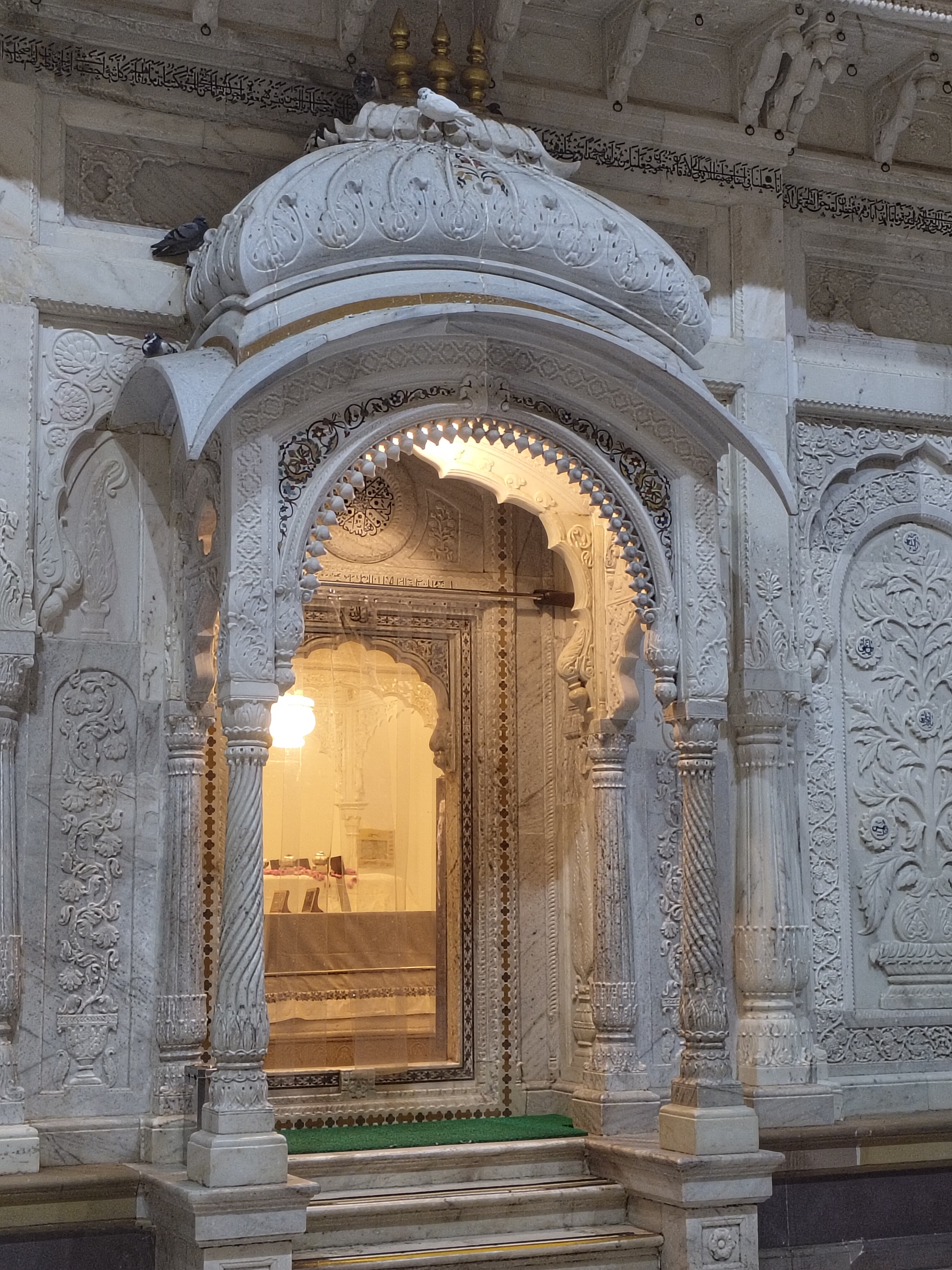
Entrance Dargah-e-Najmi

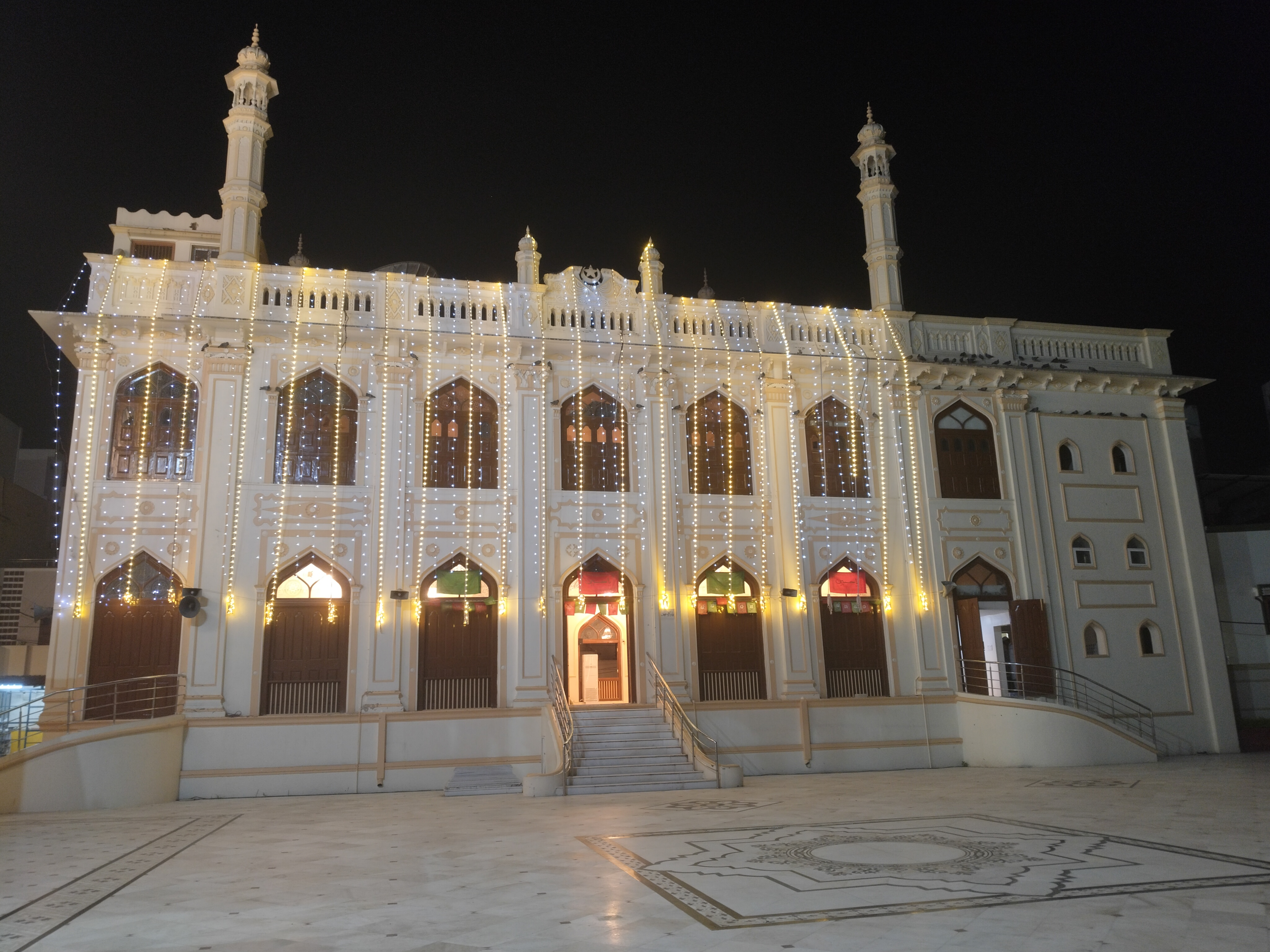
Mosque, Roja premises, Ujjain

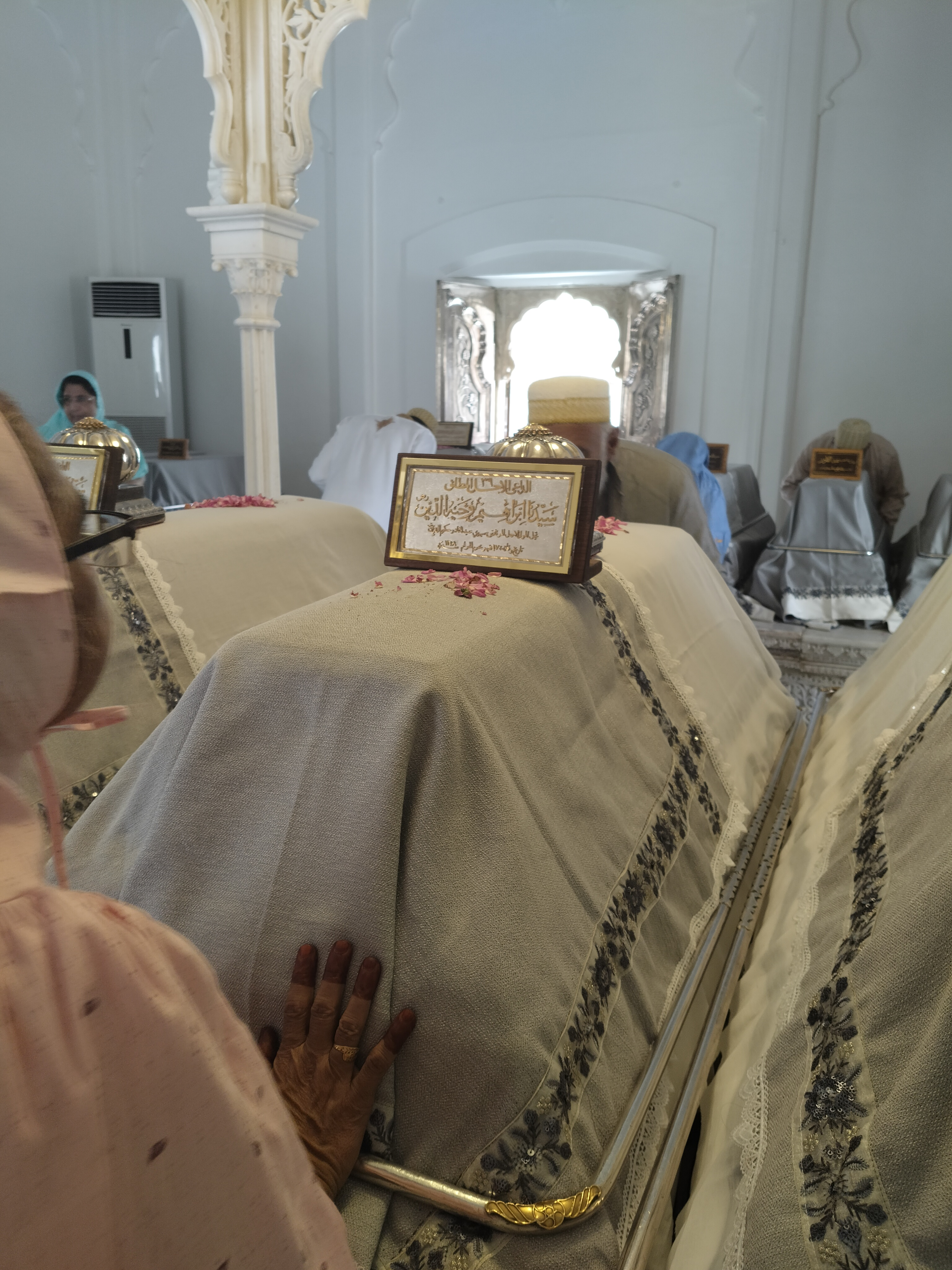
Kabr Syedna Ibrahim Vajiuddin

Shia Islam titles
Ibrahim Wajihuddin Dā'ī al-Mutlaq Born: 1690 AD Died: 1756 AD
Preceded by Ismail Badruddin II	39th Dā'ī al-Mutlaq; 1150–1168 AH/1738–1756 AD	Succeeded by Hebatullah-il-Moayed Fiddeen
