= Huzaifa Mohyuddin =

Indian Islamic leader (1950–2012)

- حذيفة محي الدين

Personal life
- Born: Huzaifa; 1 March 1950
- Died: 16 January 2012 (aged 61) Ahmedabad, India
- Resting place: Mazar e Qutbi, Ahmedabad
- Home town: Mumbai, India
- Children: Taikhoom
- Parents: Mohammed Burhanuddin (father); Aisaheba Amatullah (mother)
- Citizenship: Indian
- Education: Aljamea tus Saifiyah
- Relatives: Taher Saifuddin (grand father); Mufaddal Saifuddin (brother)

Religious life
- Religion: Shi'a Islam
- Sect: Ismailism; Dawoodi Bohra
- Jurisprudence: Musta‘lī; Tayyibi

Shahzada Huzaifa Mohyuddin was the fourth son of Mohammed Burhanuddin II, the 52nd Dai al-Mutlaq of Dawoodi Bohras, a branch of Tayyabi Mustaali Ismaili Shi'a Islam.

== Personal life ==
Mohyuddin was born on 1 March 1950 corresponding to 13 Jumada al-Awwal 1369 ھـ to Mohammed Burhanuddin and Aaisaheba Amatullah.

Mohyuddin's mithaq was taken by his grand-father, the 51st Da'i al-Mutlaq, Taher Saifuddin.

== Career ==
Mohyuddin served Alvazaratus Saifiyah which is the office of the Dai al-Mutlaq, and MSB Educational Institute management and leadership with distinction since MSB's inception in 1985 and oversaw its expansion to 23 centers worldwide. Mohyuddin was patron of a number of social, financial and educational institutions of the Dawoodi Bohra community.

Mohyuddin was the special representative of the Dai al-Mutlaq (Mohammed Burhanuddin) for the Dawoodi Bohra jamaats of Pakistan.

== Death ==
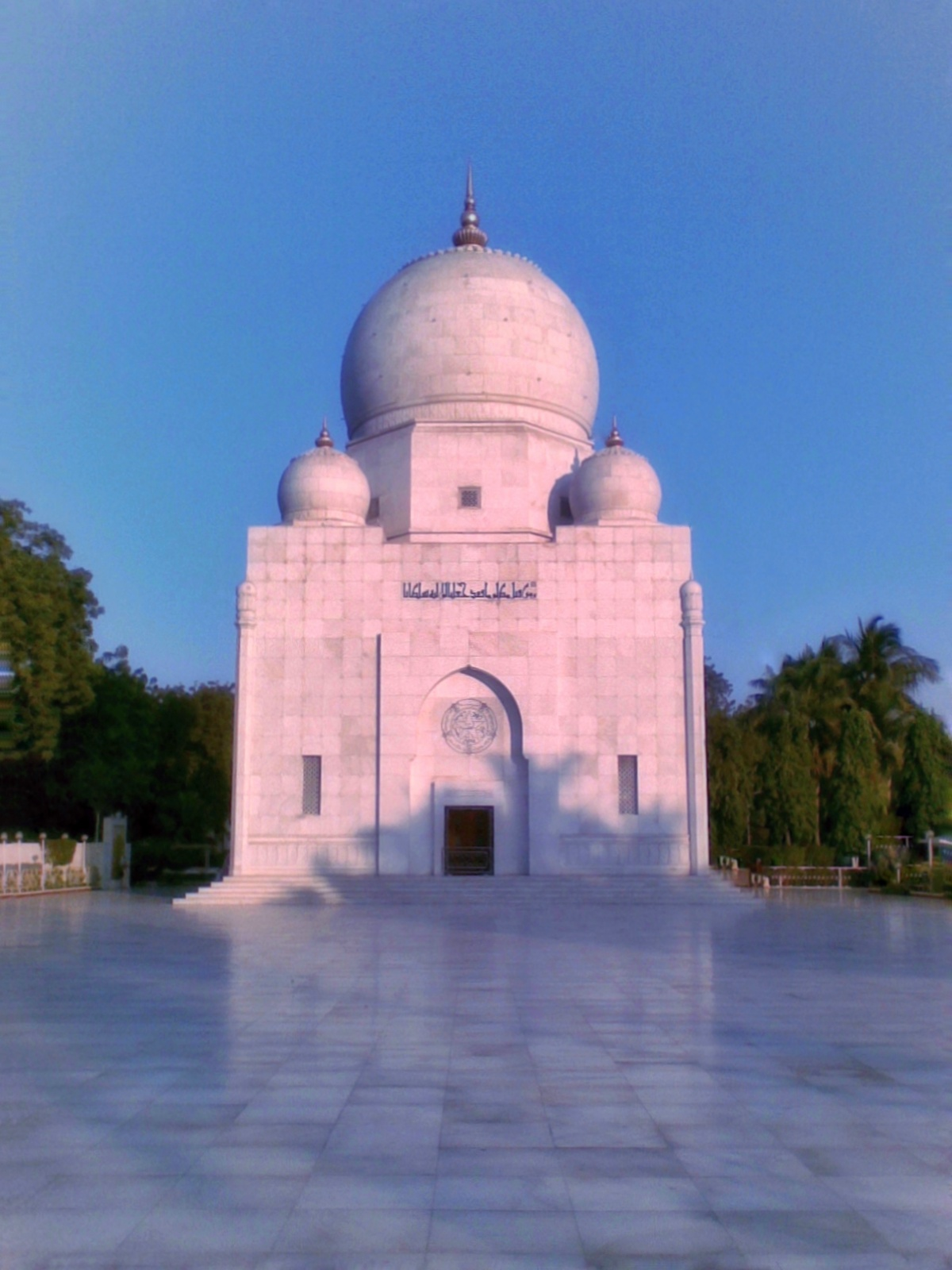
One of the mausoleums at Mazar e Qutbi, Ahmedabad, India.

Mohammed Burhanuddin and his successor Mufaddal Saifuddin were presiding over Chehlum festivities at Ahmedabad in 2012 and Mohyuddin was in attendance, where, on 16 January, he suffered a fatal cardiac arrest resulting in his death. He was laid to rest at one of mausoleums at Mazar e Qutbi.
