= 2014 Mumbai stampede =

2017 stampede near Malabar Hills, Mumbai

- Location of Maharashtra state in India
- Date: 18 January 2014
- Location: Mumbai, Maharashtra, India
- Deaths: 18
- Injuries: 56

On 18 January 2014, a stampede broke out in Mumbai near the Malabar Hill residence of Dawoodi Bohra's spiritual leader Syedna Mohammed Burhanuddin, who had died on 17 January 2014.

== Events ==
The stampede started around 1:30 a.m. when his supporters had assembled to pay their last respect after the gates were opened and the crowds burst in. According to the BBC, "reports suggest people were crushed after the gates of the house where the body of Syedna Mohammed Burhanuddin were kept were closed." Eighteen people were confirmed dead and around fifty-six injured.

According to one mourner, "There were a lot of people pouring in, and there was not much attention given by the government and the police, who should have been here and who should have managed things." Another mourner said, "In an attempt to get a glimpse of the Syedna, people started climbing on the main gates. Several fell and commotion ensued."

A full list of the victims and their ages was later provided.
