= Mohammed Burhanuddin =

Da'i al-Mutlaq of Dawoodi Bohras from 1965 to 2014

Syedna Mohammed Burhanuddin 52nd Dā'ī al-Mutlaq of the Dawoodi Bohra
- سيدنا مُحـمّـد بـُرهـان الـدّيـن
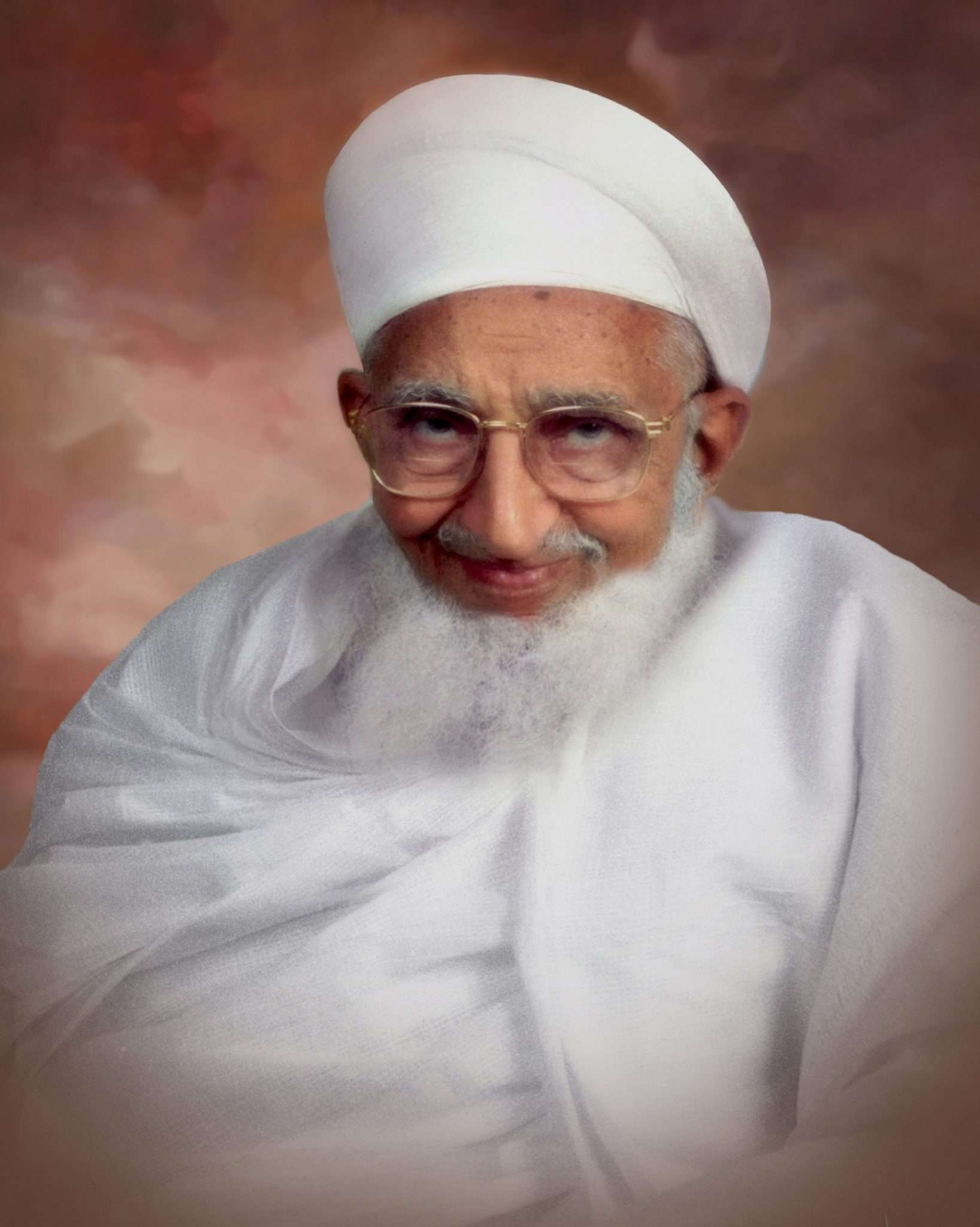
- 52nd Dai-al-Mutlaq Dr.Syedna Mohammed-Burhanuddin

Da'i al-Mutlaq
- In office 1965–2014
- Preceded by: Taher Saifuddin
- Succeeded by: Mufaddal Saifuddin
- Title: Syedna; Maulana; Mansoor al-Yemen

Personal life
- Born: Mohammed; 6 March 1915 Surat, Bombay Presidency, British India
- Died: 17 January 2014 (aged 98) Malabar Hill, Mumbai, India
- Resting place: Raudat Tahera, Mumbai
- Home town: Mumbai, India
- Spouse: Amatullah Aaisaheba
- Children: Daughters: Sakina; Batul; Huseina; Sons: Qaidjoher Ezzuddin; Mufaddal Saifuddin; Malik ul Ashtar Shujauddin; Huzaifa Mohyuddin; Idris Badruddin; Qusai Vajihuddin; Ammar Jamaluddin
- Parents: Taher Saifuddin (father); Husaina Aaisaheba (mother)
- Citizenship: Indian
- Other names: Abul Qaidjoher (Kunya); Burhanuddin (Laqab)

Religious life
- Religion: Shi'a Islam
- Sect: Ismailism; Dawoodi Bohra
- Jurisprudence: Mustaali; Tayyibi
- Occupations: Spiritual Leader; Philanthropist
- Style: His Holiness
- Awards: Padma Shri; Order of the Nile; Order of the Star of Jordan

Chancellor, Aligarh Muslim University
- In office 3 Oct 1999 – 3 Oct 2002
- Preceded by: Hakim A Hameed
- Succeeded by: Aziz M Ahmadi

Mohammed Burhanuddin (6 March 1915 – 17 January 2014) was the 52nd Da'i al-Mutlaq of Dawoodi Bohras from 1965 to 2014. He led the community for 49 years, overseeing major expansions of Dawoodi Bohra educational and philanthropic institutions. Burhanuddin followed the example of his predecessor, Taher Saifuddin, in his advocacy for the coexistence of traditional Islamic values and modern Western practices.

Burhanuddin was presented the highest national civilian honors of the states of Egypt and Jordan for his revivalism and restoration efforts. He was known in Arab countries as Azamat us-Sultan (lit. 'the Great Sovereign'). Owing to extensive travels, he was the first Dā'ī al-Mutlaq to visit Europe, Australia, and America.

== Life ==
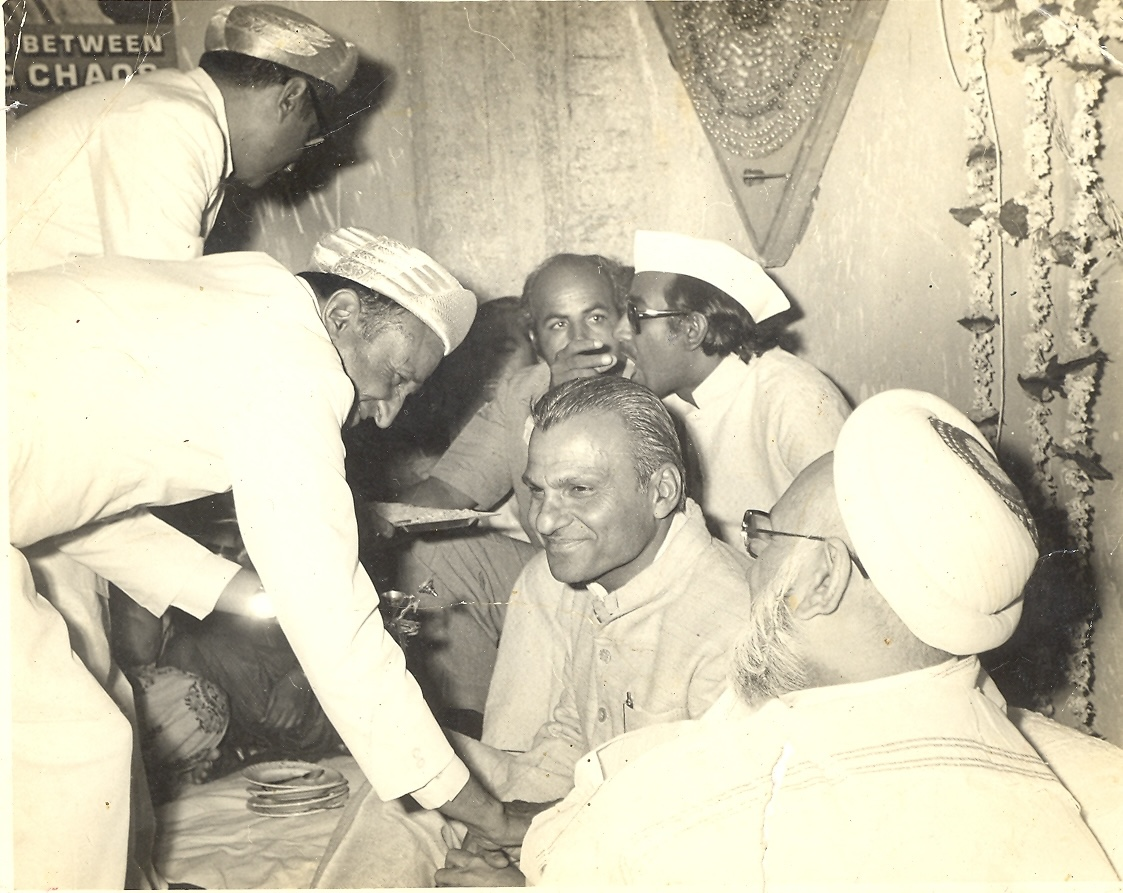
Mohammed Burhanuddin with veteran leaders Narayan Prasad Shukla and Mahesh Joshi (Madhya Pradesh politician) at a political gathering in Madhya Pradesh.

=== Early life ===
Burhanuddin was born to Taher Saifuddin and Husaina Aaisaheba in Surat in the Indian state of Gujarat.

Burhanuddin, taught by his father, completed his religious education at the age of 13. Following Burhanuddin's mīthāq (oath) in Surat, aged 15, he was appointed Amir al-Hajj (Arabic: أمِير الحَجّ, lit. 'chief of hajj pilgrims'), was conferred the title of Shaykh (Arabic: الشيخ, lit. 'leader'), and bestowed the laqab of Burhan al-Din (Arabic: بُرهان الدّيْن, lit. 'proof of faith') by his father, Taher Saifuddin.

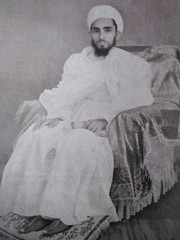
Burhanuddin just after his appointment to the station of Mazoon al-Dawat in Surat on Yawm al-Mab'as, 1934.

On his 17th birthday, Burhanuddin was promoted to the rank of Haddiyah (lit. 'a high rank') and made in charge of Alvazaratus Saifiyah, the central administrative body of the community. At age 19, Taher Saifuddin designated him as his successor to the office of the Dai al-Mutlaq (Arabic: داعي المطلق, lit. 'absolute missionary'), and subsequently elevated him to the station of Mazoon al-Da'wat (Arabic: مأذون الدعوة, lit. 'authorized missionary'), making him his second-in-command. By age 20, Burhanuddin had committed the entire Quran to memory.

=== Marriage and family ===
Burhanuddin married Amatullah Aaisaheba in 1937 in Surat. She was the daughter of Abdul Husain, a descendant of the 46th Da'i al-Mutlaq Abdul Qadir Najmuddin. The city and the Iwan (lit. 'hall') of Aljamea-tus-Saifiyah, the main venue of the celebrations, were decorated heavily. Taher Saifuddin extended an open invitation to all community members to attend the ceremonies, and had also invited distinguished dignitaries and government officials.

Burhanuddin and Amatullah had 10 children, seven sons and three daughters.

=== Al-Dai al-Mutlaq ===
After the demise of his father, Taher Saifuddin on 12 November 1965, Mohammed Burhanuddin presided over a 40-day mourning period and assumed the office of his predecessor. He chose the burial place of his father to be Qasre Husaini (Raudat Tahera), the site where the shrines of Imam Ali and Imam Husain were fabricated.

=== Centenary ===
In 2011, Burhanuddin, celebrated his centenary in accordance with the Islamic calendar. A mega procession was organised in Mumbai that started from MG Road to Azam Campus Grounds (the route is popularly known as Marine Drive) involving 8000 participants. Followers were dressed in golden robes traversing on horses or upon chariots. Various floats were a part of the parade displaying a variety of accomplishments during Burhanuddin's tenure. Similar processions took place at community centers across the world. During the ceremonies held over the period of a week, Burhanuddin laid the foundation stone for the SBUT project in Bhendi Bazar and announced the opening of a branch of the Aljamea-tus-Saifiyah university in Nairobi, Kenya.

=== Succession ===
Burhanuddin spent a few days every year in London, where he had a home. During one such visit in 2011, he suffered a stroke and was admitted to Cromwell Hospital. Some days after being admitted to the hospital, he appointed his 2nd son, Mufaddal Saifuddin, as his successor holding a few members of his immediate family to bear witness, as per the religious traditions. He asked for the news to be communicated to all community members.

Upon his return to Mumbai, Burhanuddin visited the mausoleum of his father. There, he reiterated his proclamation upon Mufaddal Saifuddin as his successor-designate amongst thousands of onlookers, the event also being broadcast to a number of other locations in Mumbai.

== Activities ==
=== Libas al-Anwar ===
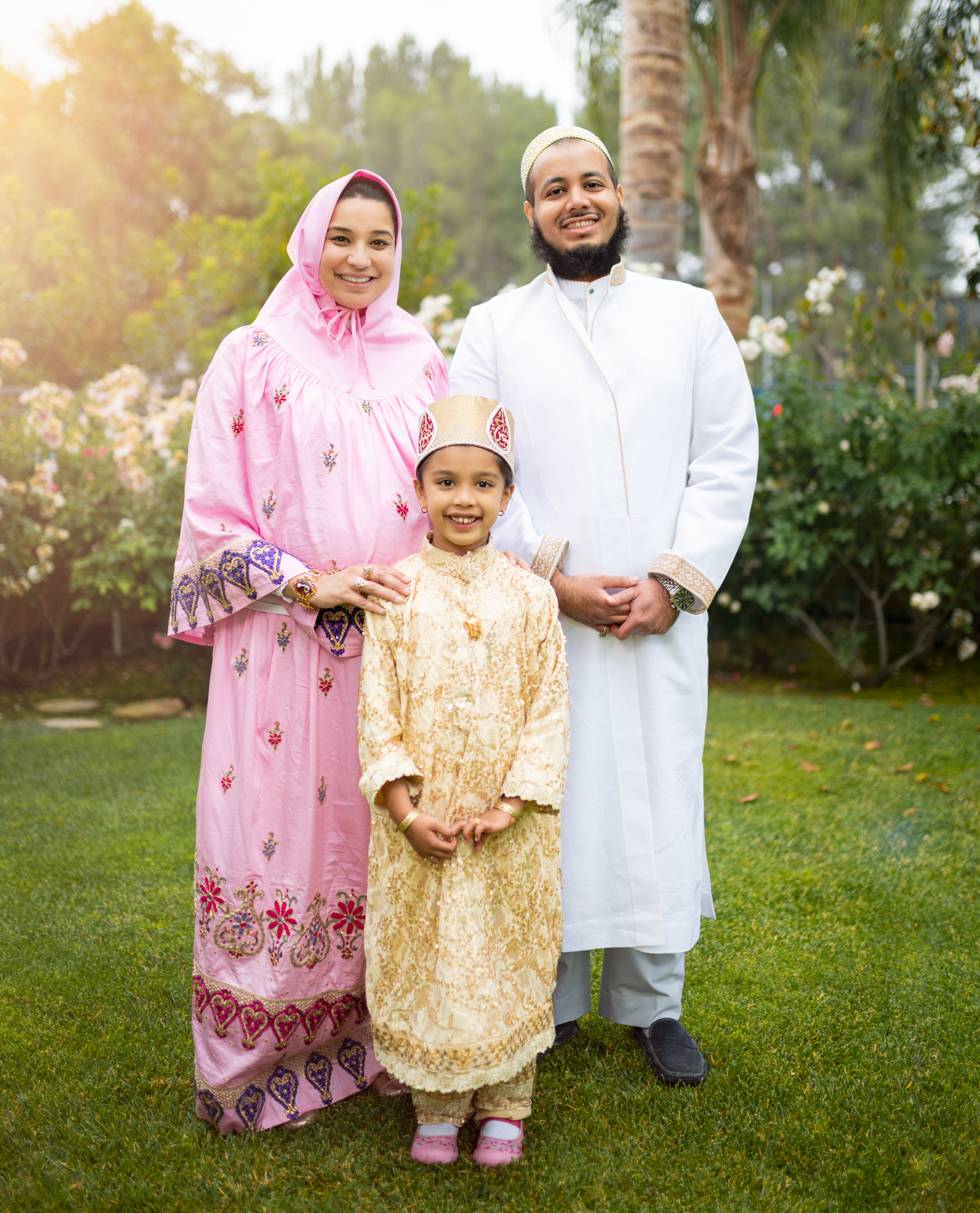
A Dawoodi Bohra family in their religious attire, the Libas al-Anwar.

Burhanuddin issued a dress code, calling for male Bohras to grow a beard and wear a white topi and kurta, and for women to wear a colorful two piece abaya, known formally as a Rida. This Islamization countered a trend toward assimilation into the larger culture of their ancestors that was also prevalent under his predecessor, Taher Saifuddin and the previous Du'at before them. The history of this culture can be traced back to the medieval Fatimid dynasty in Egypt.

=== Al-Jame al-Anwar ===
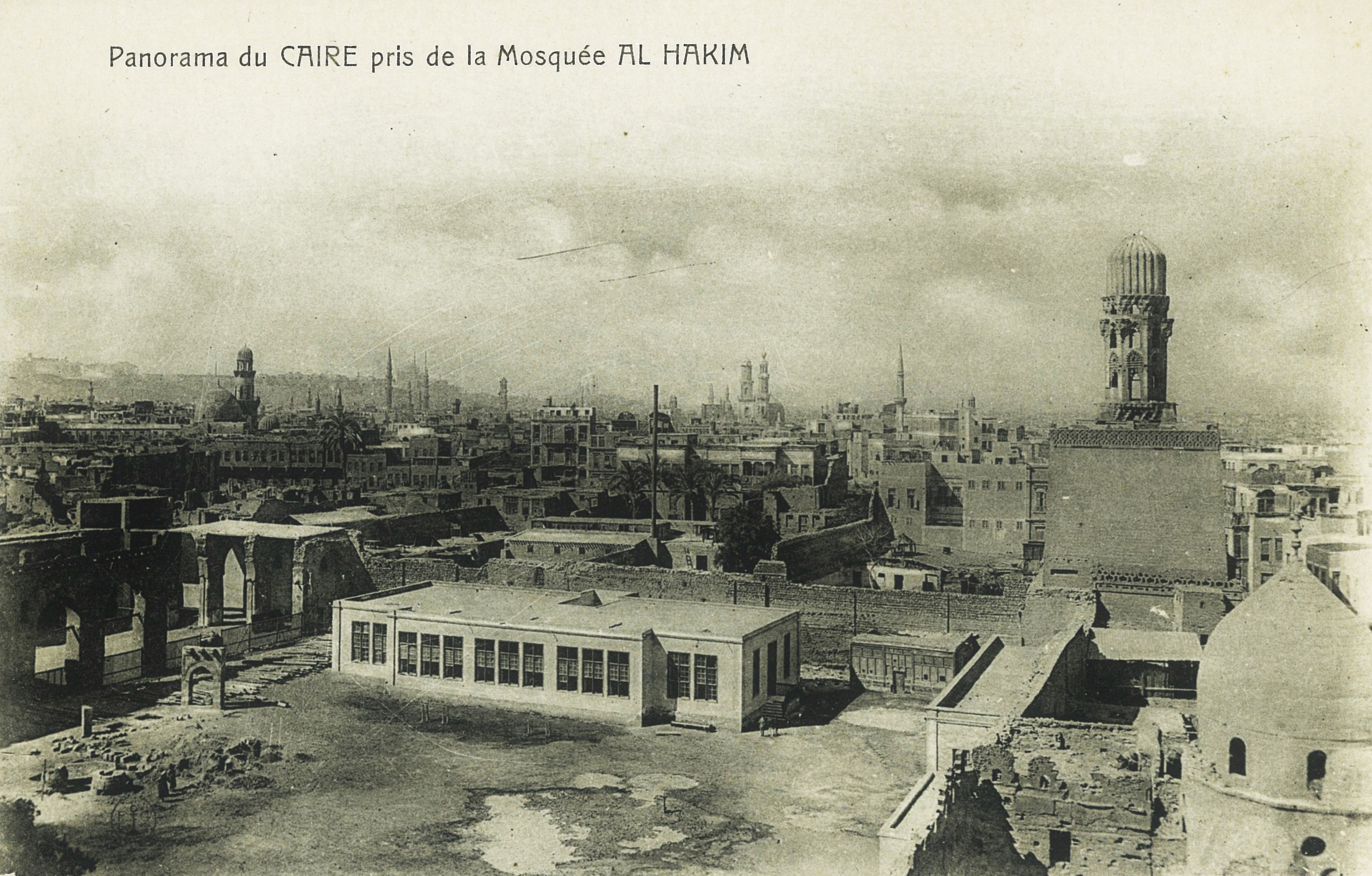
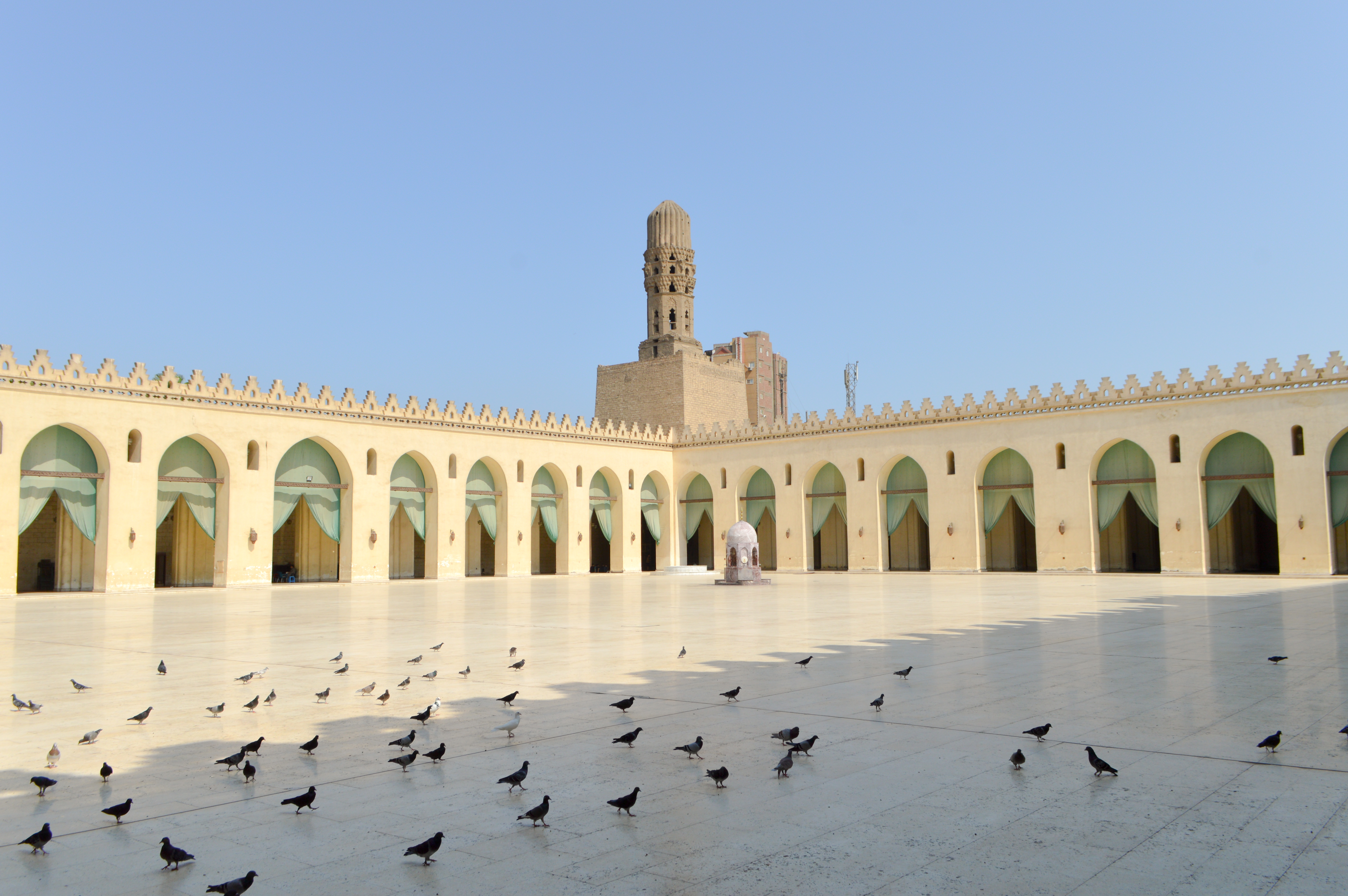
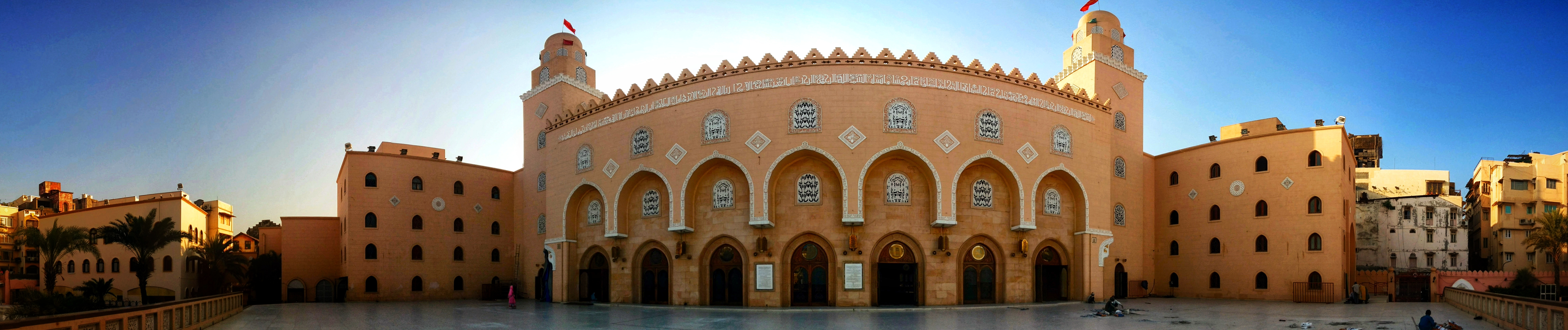
Top: Jame Anwar before and after renovations under taken by Burhanuddin. The mosque was formally inaugurated by Anwar Sadat, the 3rd President of Egypt, in 1980. Bottom: Masjid e Moazzam in Surat post re-construction by Burhanuddin is a striking example of Neo-Fatimid architectural style that flourished during his tenure.
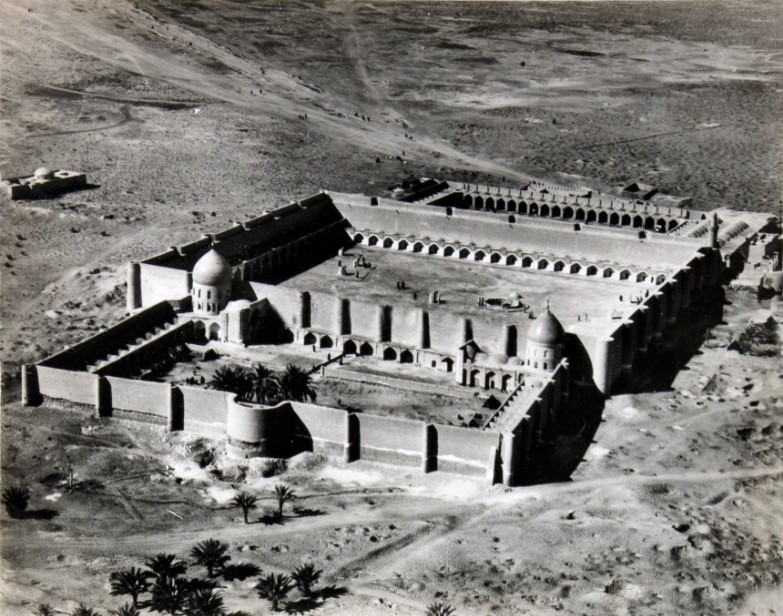
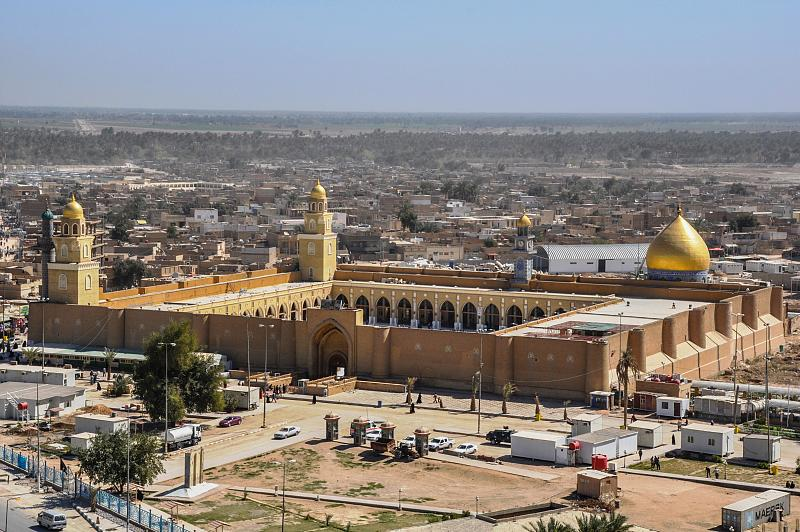
Great Mosque of Kufa before and after restoration by Burhanuddin in 1990s.

In 1980 CE/1401 AH, the Al-Hakim mosque was extensively refurbished in white marble and gold trim by Mohammed Burhanuddin. Remnants of the original decorations, including stucco carvings, timber tie-beams, and Quranic inscriptions were restored as part of the renovations. His intent to restore the ancient Al-Hakim Mosque as a place of worship in contemporary times necessitated a lighting solution that provided this important functionality to the mosque and did so in a manner that paid tribute to the Fatimid tradition of illumination and its aesthetics. The miraculous emergence of the mishkat or small lantern from the niche of the richly decorated façade of Al Jami al Aqmar provided that solution. The niche in which the lantern motif was found has also been compared to the mihrab niche of Al Azhar mosque, the same also now found in Al-Hakim mosque, which has a central motif that resembles a large lamp or lantern.

=== Educational contributions ===
In October 1999, Burhanuddin was elected Chancellor of the Aligarh Muslim University, a position that his father also held. He is credited with expanding the two century old Arabic university Al Jamea tus Saifiyah. In 1983, a new campus of "Al Jamea tus Saifiyah" was built by him in Karachi. He built the "Burhaniyah Business Counseling Center" in Mumbai to provide modern business solutions. He also built the Raudat Tahera, a mausoleum of his father Taher Saifuddin in Mumbai, India. It is one of a kind, having the entire Quran inscribed on its inner white walls in letters decorated with of gold leaves and with precious stones. It was inaugurated in 1975 by the erstwhile President of India Fakhruddin Ali Ahmed.

In 1976, he established a facility exclusively dedicated to the study of arts and sciences of the Quran.

==== MSB Schools ====
MSB (also known as Al Madrasa Tus Saifiya Tul Burhaniyah) was founded by Burhanuddin in 1984, with its first two branches in Mumbai, India and Nairobi, Kenya. It is accredited with the Indian Certificate of Secondary Education and is operated under the purview of the office of the Dai al-Mutlaq of the Dawoodi Bohras. The institute has branches in 25 cities across India, Pakistan, East Africa, and the Middle East.

==== Aljamea-tus-Saifiyah ====
Knowledge is our legacy. Hence, it is our duty to protect this legacy for the betterment of our community. The world is changing fast and, to live a respectable life, it is necessary for us to be aware of what’s going on around us; it is our duty to adapt to modern technology and industrial development.

— Mohammed Burhanuddin

On the occasion of his 100th birth anniversary, Mohammed Burhanuddin established a third campus of the institute of Aljamea-tus-Saifiyah in Nairobi, Kenya. Two years later, his son Mufaddal Saifuddin, announced the dedication of yet another campus of Aljamea-tus-Saifiyah in Marol (Mumbai) on his behalf. The construction of each campus is centered around a masjid, with all buildings oriented towards the Kaaba in Mecca. All four campuses have integrated green building techniques and observe environmental friendly operations. The buildings have been designed to utilize sunlight and facilitate natural ventilation as much as possible, and avoid dependency on artificial methods that consume great amounts of electricity, for e.g. solar water heating systems have been used in the dormitories of the Surat campus. A layout of coconut trees planted along the perimeter of the Karachi campus’ sports field mitigates waterlogging not only in Jamea but also in the surrounding homes. Recycling, compost facilities, motion sensor lighting and paper reduction policies are also applied in all four campuses.

=== Al-Multaqa al-Fatemi al-Ilmi ===
In the year 1978, Burhanuddin held a historic Islamic conference in Surat where he called upon delegates of the community centers to adhere to the time-tested traditions of their faith while also embracing the beneficial ‘new’ with the advent of scientific advancements. Amongst his important messages to the community was to renounce the practice of riba (lit. 'interest and usury'). The congregation initially started in Surat and was thereafter held in Mumbai, Karachi, Nairobi and Dar es salaam between 1978 - 1988.

The first gathering at Surat in 1978 was held in Iwaan al-Barakat (lit. 'Hall of Blessings') of Aljamea-tus-Saifiyah. Burhanuddin laid down seven principles in this meet to develop social, educational and economic fervor amongst his followers.

In 1984, on the twin occasions of the 100th birth anniversary of his father, Taher Saifuddin and the 1400th birth anniversary of Husayn ibn Ali, Muhammed's grandson; Burhanuddin laid down another set of principles similar in spirit to the ones established before with the added emphasis of Qardan Hasana (lit. 'good loan'), which are interest-free loans. The abolition of riba from an institutional level and to certain extents on an individual level is considered to be the highlight of these meetings.

=== Community kitchens ===
Burhanuddin established community kitchens (viz. Faiz al-Mawaid al-Burhaniyah) to provide meals everyday to the Dawoodi Bohra families, thus providing free time for women to pursue economic, educational or religious activities. The community kitchens don't discriminate between the privileged and the underprivileged sections, both getting the same "good quality and hygienically-prepared" food, while the community members have the provision of paying for their own family, and for sponsoring those who cannot afford it.

=== Medical aid ===
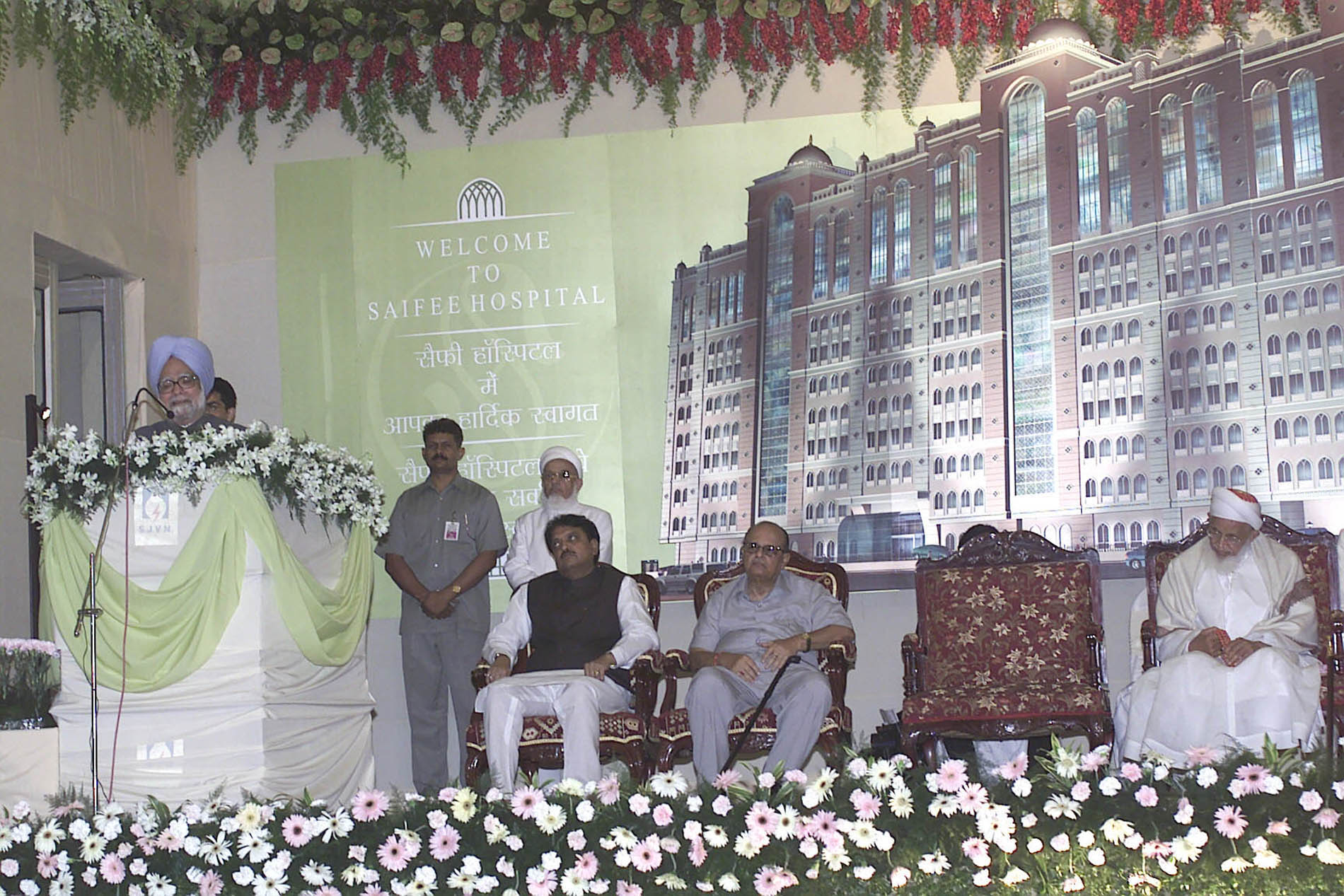
Manmohan Singh, then Prime Minister of India, speaks at the inauguration of Saifee Hospital on 4 June 2005. Seated on the podium are Vilasrao Deshmukh, Mohammed Fazal, and Burhanuddin.

==== Saifee Hospital ====
Burhanuddin conceptualized and established Saifee Hospital in Mumbai, a state-of-the-art, multi-specialty, 250-bed hospital. It was inaugurated in 2005 by Dr. Manmohan Singh, the erstwhile prime minister of India. During the inauguration, Dr Singh said: "The Bohra community has made a noble and significant contribution to society at large in constructing the Saifee Hospital and I too pray and hope that it benefits all sections of our society"

The main vision of the hospital is to provide preventive, curative and holistic care to individuals from every strata. The hospital consists of 2574 beds and is a multi-speciality healthcare destination. It has 44 ICU beds, 9 Operational Theatres and conducts approximately 10,000 surgeries in a year. It has been certified by ‘The International Standards Organisation’ (ISO) and National Accreditation Board for Testing and Calibration Laboratories (NABL).

The hospital specializes in Robotic Surgeries, Bariatric Surgeries, Cardiology, Critical Care Medicine and Dentistry among other services.

==== Burhani Medical Idara ====
Mohammed Burhanuddin set up the Burhani Medical Idara (Department). The aim of this department is to provide medical aid to the members of the Dawoodi Bohra community.

The official website of the department has an online Doctor's directory which enlists the name of all doctors of the community who are providing their services free of charge. As of 15 December 2019, a total of 2549 doctors have been registered with the department. The ratio of doctors with respect to the total members of the community is 1:300.

Apart from this, hospitals have been established all across the globe in places such as Tanzania and Pakistan, where medical aid is provided at a subsidised rate.

Saifee Ambulance in Mumbai provides subsidised medical services to the local neighbourhood. It extends help in hospitalisation, immunisation and blood donation. It also sets up regular medical camps.

=== Saifee Burhani Upliftment Trust ===
One of Burhanuddin's major undertakings was the establishment of the Saifee Burhani Upliftment Trust. This redevelopment project comprising 16.5 acres of landform has approximately 250 existing buildings, 1250 shops and 3200 families under its radar in South Mumbai. The idea is to incorporate the locality's dilapidated structures into a more sustainable development project, with new buildings, modern infrastructure, wider roads, more open spaces and commercial establishments.

Using the ‘best principles of urban planning’ the project aims to meet the present and future socio-economic needs of the people. The neighborhood, famously known as Bhendi Bazaar has been divided into 7 sub-clusters. The majority of the flats in these buildings will relocate the existing tenants/occupants to better accommodation. The area will have its own environment-friendly decorum along with an efficient sewage treatment plant, solar panels, rainwater harvesting, and garbage disposal units. The project aims to be resource neutral. It has already been pre-certified 'Gold' by the Indian Green Buildings Council.

=== Memorisation of the Quran ===
Burhanuddin emphasized ‘memorising the entire Quran’. There are several examples where Burhanuddin has announced this idea on an international level, for example on the occasion of completion of 1400 years of Quranic revelation on Mohammed (1387 H), and in the International Islamic Conference on Aspects of Islamic Studies at Albert Hall, London (Meherjaan al-Alami al Islami 1976 CE) he addressed this desire in his speech. Subsequently, in that same year, a Quranic institute by the name of Mahad al-Zahra was established by him. The main objectives of this institution is to facilitate learning of the art of recitation, memorization and understanding of the Quran and its sciences.

Mohammed Burhanuddin had inaugurated Mahad al-Zahra, Karachi in the year 1404H, during his birthday celebrations there. In 1415 H, he delivered a sermon where he stressed upon the memorisation of the Quran and directed the students of Aljamea-tus-Saifiyah to commit the entire Quran to memory. In the following year 1416 H, Husain Burhanuddin, the grandson of Mohammed Burhanuddin memorised the entire Quran and since then this initiative has taken traction tenfold.

In the year 1418 H/ 1998, Burhanuddin laid down the foundation for a new branch of Mahad al-Zahra in Surat (India). The new facility provides the ideal environment of comfort and peace for the students engrossed in the demanding memorisation process. This institute also houses an audio studio where various recordings have been taped. The entire Quran has also been recorded and distributed via CDs and lately, through the internet. Students of Aljamea-tus-Saifiyah memorise the Quran under this institution and render teaching services to community members residing in different parts of the world. In H 1433 / C.E. 2013, a kindergarten named Rawdat al-Quran al-Kareem (RQK) was established in Mumbai with the aim of nurturing young pupils in the light of the Quran.

==== E-learning ====
In the year 2005, a distance-learning memorization program was launched to reach out to members of the community who live in distant cities such as Sydney, Australia, Los Angeles.

=== Marriage ceremonies ===
Burhanuddin continued his father's tradition of organising mass marriages, known as Rasm-e Saifee, during his visits to various Dawoodi Bohra communities. Taiseer un Nikah, an international committee, plays principal role in match-making, counseling, and facilitating the solemnization of these marriages.

== Ashara Mubaraka ==
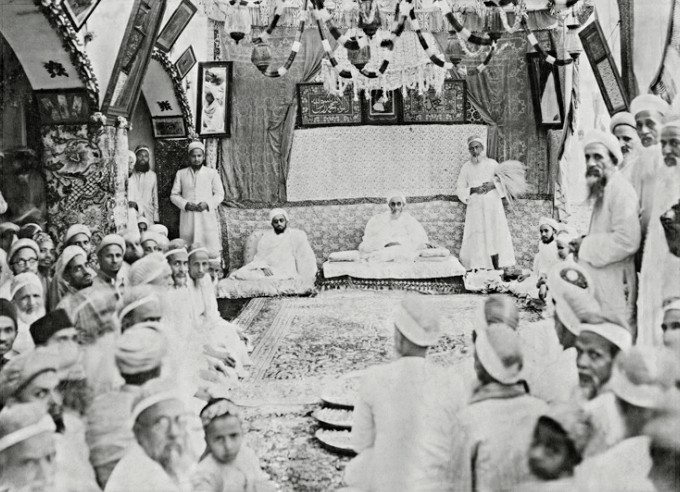
Burhanuddin and his father Saifuddin at a religious gathering in Rampura, Central India Agency c. 1947.

The Ashara Mubaraka (Arabic: عشرة مباركه, lit. 'the blessed ten') is an annual mourning of Husayn ibn Ali's martyrdom at the Battle of Karbala. In the tradition of the Fatimids, the Da'i al-Mutlaq delivers ten wa'az (Persian: وعظ, lit. 'sermons') on Islamic philosophy, history, liturgy, expository, horatory over 9 days: One wa'az each day for 8 days starting 2nd Muharram and two on the final day of Ashura (Urdu: عاشوراء), the 10th of Muharram. Every year the Da'i al-Mutlaq selects a city to host the Ashara at which, at times, attract 100,000 to 200,000 azadar-e Husayn (Urdu: عزادارِ حسين, lit. 'mourners of Husayn'). The ashara wa'az from the host city is, on occasion, broadcast to various venues around the world. Pilgrims are often provided with free accommodation, transportation, and meals. The faculty of Funun al-Quran, a department of Aljamea-tus-Saifiyah, oversees elaborate Tazyeen (lit. 'decor') of the host venue.

List of cities Burhanuddin presided over Ashara at as Dai al-Mutlaq
CE	AH	City	Province	Country	Cont	Start Date	End Date
1960s
1966	1386	Mumbai	Maharashtra	India	Asia	22 April	30 April
1967	1387	Mumbai	Maharashtra	India	Asia	11 April	19 April
1968	1388	Mumbai	Maharashtra	India	Asia	30 March	7 April
1969	1389	Mecca and Medina	Mecca Province and Medina Province	Saudi Arabia	Asia	20 March	28 March
1970s
1970	1390	Colombo	Western Province	Sri Lanka	Asia	9 March	17 March
1971	1391	Kolkata	West Bengal	India	Asia	27 February	7 March
1972	1392	Surat	Gujarat	India	Asia	16 February	24 February
1973	1393	Mumbai	Maharashtra	India	Asia	4 February	12 February
1974	1394	Mumbai	Maharashtra	India	Asia	25 January	2 February
1975	1395	Mumbai	Maharashtra	India	Asia	14 January	22 January
1976	1396	Kolkata	West Bengal	India	Asia	3 January	11 January
1976	1397	Chennai	Tamil Nadu	India	Asia	23 December	31 December
1977	1398	Karachi	Sindh	Pakistan	Asia	12 December	20 December
1978	1399	Jamnagar	Gujarat	India	Asia	1 December	9 December
1979	1400	Mumbai	Maharashtra	India	Asia	21 November	29 November
1980s
1980	1401	Cairo	Cairo Governorate	Egypt	Africa	9 November	17 November
1981	1402	Cairo	Cairo Governorate	Egypt	Africa	30 October	7 November
1982	1403	Sidhpur	Gujarat	India	Asia	19 October	27 October
1983	1404	Karachi	Sindh	Pakistan	Asia	8 October	16 October
1984	1405	Nairobi	Nairobi County	Kenya	Africa	27 September	5 October
1985	1406	Surat	Gujarat	India	Asia	16 September	24 September
1986	1407	Indore	Madhya Pradesh	India	Asia	5 September	13 September
1987	1408	Karachi	Sindh	Pakistan	Asia	26 August	3 September
1988	1409	Mumbai	Maharashtra	India	Asia	14 August	22 August
1989	1410	Surat	Gujarat	India	Asia	4 August	12 August
1990s
1990	1411	Dar es Salaam	Coastal Indian Ocean	Tanzania	Africa	24 July	1 August
1991	1412	Colombo	Western Province	Sri Lanka	Asia	13 July	21 July
1992	1413	Pune	Maharashtra	India	Asia	2 July	10 July
1993	1414	Mombasa	Mombasa County	Kenya	Africa	21 June	29 June
1994	1415	Mumbai	Maharashtra	India	Asia	10 June	18 June
1995	1416	Mombasa	Mombasa County	Kenya	Africa	31 May	8 June
1996	1417	Karachi	Sindh	Pakistan	Asia	19 May	27 May
1997	1418	Surat	Gujarat	India	Asia	8 May	16 May
1998	1419	Nairobi	Nairobi County	Kenya	Africa	28 April	6 May
1999	1420	Colombo	Western Province	Sri Lanka	Asia	17 April	25 April
2000s
2000	1421	Surat	Gujarat	India	Asia	6 April	14 April
2001	1422	Houston	Texas	United States	North America	26 March	3 April
2002	1423	Indore	Madhya Pradesh	India	Asia	15 March	23 March
2003	1424	Mumbai	Maharashtra	India	Asia	5 March	13 March
2004	1425	Dubai	Emirate of Dubai	United Arab Emirates	Asia	22 February	1 March
2005	1426	Surat	Gujarat	India	Asia	10 February	18 February
2006	1427	Mumbai	Maharashtra	India	Asia	31 January	8 February
2007	1428	Colombo	Western Province	Sri Lanka	Asia	20 January	28 January
2008	1429	Colombo	Western Province	Sri Lanka	Asia	9 January	17 January
2008/09	1430	Mombasa	Mombasa County	Kenya	Africa	29 December	6 January
2009	1431	Marol	Maharashtra	India	Asia	18 December	26 December
2010s
2010	1432	Mumbai (Note: The Ashara sermons and prayers were led by Saifuddin, Burhanuddin's son.)	Maharashtra	India	Asia	8 December	16 December
2011	1433	Mumbai	Maharashtra	India	Asia	27 November	5 December
2012	1434	Surat (Note: Saifuddin, Burhanuddin's son, led the sermons and prayers.)	Gujarat	India	Asia	15 November	23 November
2013	1435	Mumbai (Note: The Ashara Mubaraka sermons and prayers were led by Burhanuddin's son, Saifuddin.)	Maharashtra	India	Asia	5 November	13 November

== Teaching ==
=== Patriotism ===
Mohammed Burhaunndin always instructed his followers to be patriotic to the state they resided in. In Islam, loyalty to the land of abode is an integral part of one's faith. Mohammed Burhanuddin urged his followers to follow the laws of the country they live in and strive to be good citizens. Dawoodi Bohras have therefore become well integrated into the various societies that they have become part of, in the countries in which they reside. They are active in community help efforts and also partake in social drives and campaigns.

=== Islamic Identity ===
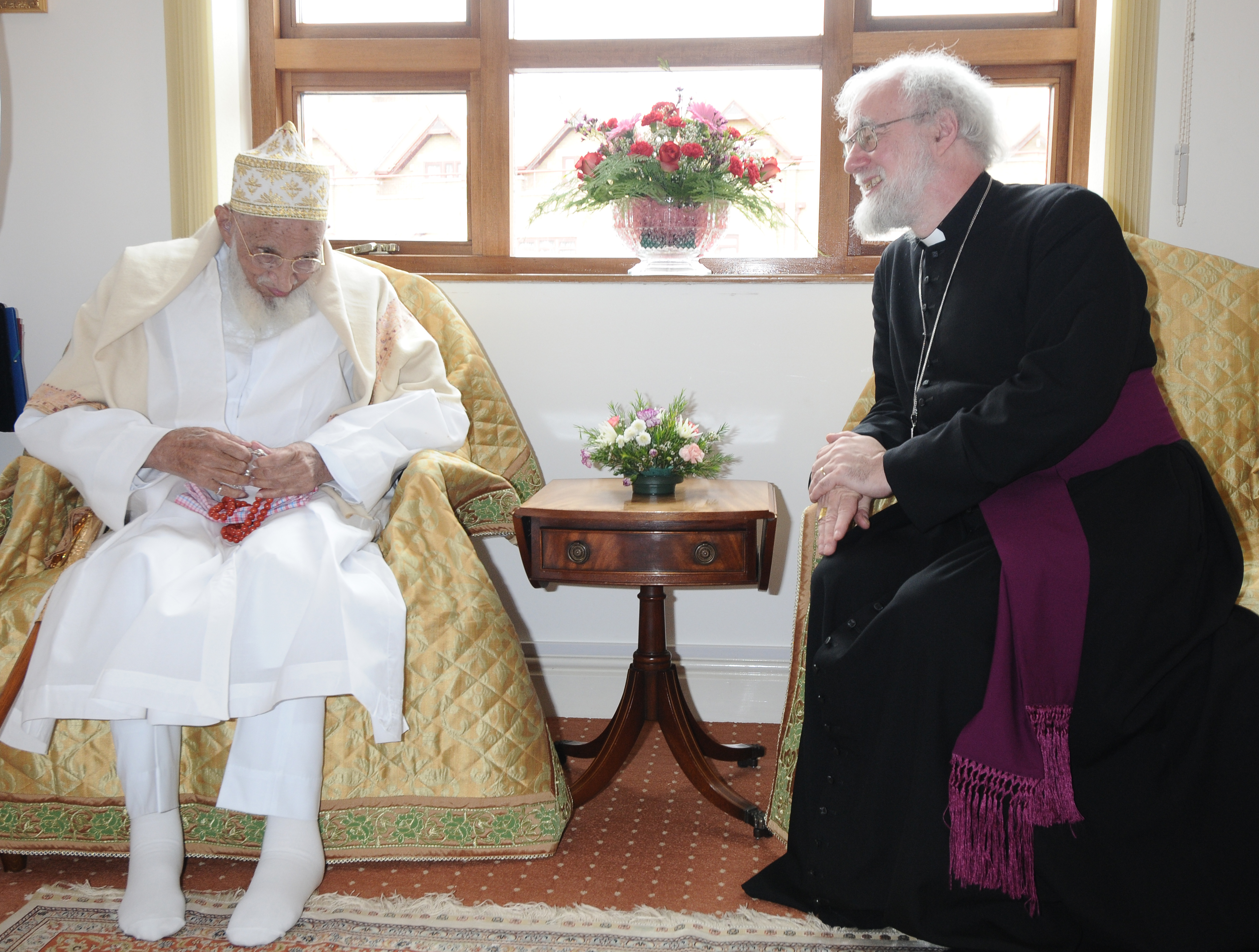
Burhanuddin in conversation with Rowan Williams, Archbishop of Canterbury, in London (2010).

Throughout his 50 years in the office, Mohammed Burhaunndin strove to imbibe a particular Islamic identity to his followers. The most prominent distinction of the Dawoodi Bohra community is their religious attire, known as the Libas-al-Anwar (lit. Radiant Clothes.) For men, it usually consists of a trouser-like pant called an izar, coupled with a loose elongated shirt-like draping over the upper body --- called a kurta along with an overcoat called a saya, which is topped off by a skull cap called - Topi. The women's attire is called a ‘Rida’ which is an all-covering dress worn by Bohra women. Furthermore, the men in the community adorn a full-grown beard which adds to their distinctive identity.

In addition to the distinctive clothes, he also urged his followers to speak a unique language, known as the Lisan-al-Da’wah (the language of Da’wah). The language is predominantly rooted in Arabic and Gujarati with a mix of words from other languages such as Urdu and Persian.

Burhanuddin has also supported the movement towards Islamic English where the expression of Islamic norms and Quranic concepts are better articulated in the English language without compromising the meaning. For example ‘Mosque’ though derived from the Arabic word ‘Masjid’ fails to convey the original meaning of the word, ‘a place for prostration or sajda.

=== Upliftment ===
During his life, Mohammed Burhanuddin regularly urged his followers to extend help to the less fortunate in society. In the year H 1424 H/ C.E. 2002, during his visit to the island nation of Madagascar, Burhanuddin instituted the idea of ‘upliftment’ and called upon all the members of the community to help their fellow community members. Along with the community members, he expanded his efforts to help the society at large. This can be understood by the aids provided by him in the aftermath of the Bombay Riots and the Bhuj earthquake.

During the month of Ramadan, the less fortunate members of the community would be provided essentials such as clothes, food, shelter and medical services.

To carry out these functions, Mohammed Burhanuddin set up institutions such as His Holiness Doctor Syedna Taher Saifuddin Memorial Foundation (STSMF).

=== Trade and business ===
The new Trust was aimed to provide modern solutions for today's modern business. Throughout his life, Mohammed Burhanuddin urged his community to enter the world of trade, business and industrialization. The word ‘Bohra’ itself denotes the meaning of ‘a trader’. Mohammed Burhanuddin encouraged his followers to move forward and expand their businesses. He stressed to his followers to keep the tradition of business and entrepreneurship intact in the community. To help his followers to that extent, Mohammed Burhanuddin institutionalized the concept of Islamic Loans which are interest free, known as Qardan Hasanah (Good Loans). In 1991, Mohammed Burhanuddin established the Burhani Qardan Hasana Trust. The main goal of this trust is to provide interest free loans to community members to fulfill their economic goals and help expand their businesses. Furthermore, to help enhance his community members' business skills, Mohammed Burhanuddin set up the Burhaniyah Business Counseling Centre (BBCC) in Mumbai. The center organized numerous expos named Burhani Expo to help connect community members with each other to expand their businesses and create a global network of traders within the community.

In 2014, Mohammed Burhanuddin again re-institutionalized this concept by renaming the Qardan Hasnah trust by the name of Hasanaat al Qardan Hasan al Burhaniyah. The BBCC was also absorbed by this new trust and a new department was formed to help community members prosper in their business endeavors. This department was named ‘Tijarat Rabeha’ which translates into Profitable Business. The main aim of this department is to facilitate the needs of new and upcoming entrepreneurs within the community by providing modern day solutions and ideas to them. It also organizes numerous seminars, workshops and webinars to help existing businessmen within the community expand their businesses and evolve their business acumen in course with the ever changing times.

=== Welfare of women ===
Burhanuddin formed the Amatullah Aaisaheba Memorial Trust in 1996 in memory of his late wife, Amatullah Aai who had played a leading role in the welfare of the Dawoodi Bohra women. The trust lays particular emphasis on the support of home industries run by women.

=== Housing complexes ===
The community facilitates schemes to provide flats and houses at cheaper rates. Several housing complexes have been established all over India, for example in Kalyan, Marol and even in foreign countries such as in Nairobi, Kenya.

In H 1426 / C.E. 2004, a department known as Faiz Enayat Amakene Anwar was established in Mumbai. The main aim of this department is to provide better living conditions for those living in poor conditions.

== Awards and honors ==
Top: Star of Jordan (Jordan). Bottom: Stamp commemorating Burhanuddin's 100th birthday (Pakistan).
- Order of the Star of Jordan, the highest civic honor of Jordan.
- Order of the Nile, the highest civilian honor of Egypt.
- Conferred doctorate in Islamic Sciences by Al Azhar University, doctorate in Theology by Aligarh Muslim University, and doctorate in literature by University of Karachi.
- Padma Shri, the fourth highest civilian award of India, in 2015.
- One among The 500 Most Influential Muslims in the years 2009—2013.

=== Religious titles ===
Over the course of Burhanuddin's tenure as Mazoon al-Dawat, he was bestowed numerous khitabaat (lit. 'titles') by his predecessor, Taher Saifuddin, owing to his accomplishments in the service of the Dawoodi Bohra community and the society at large. These titles were topic of all ten waaz of his son Mufaddal Saifuddin's first Ashara Mubaraka as the 53rd Da'i al-Mutlaq, in 2014.

- The Foundation of the Learned Monotheists (عمدة العلماء الموحدين): Bestowed on the day of Eid-e Ghadir-e Khum (1361 AH).
- The Perfect Young Man and Preeminent Elder (الفتى الكامل والشيخ الفاضل): Taher Saifuddin upon conferring nass on Burhanuddin bestowed this title to him in his Risaalah, 'Bahr Fadl Kabeer' (1352 AH).
- The Crown of the Pure and Radiant Dawat (تاج الدعوة الطيبة الغراء): Bestowed on 27th Zilqad al-Haraam in Madras (1359 AH).
- The Proof of Faith (برهان الدين): This laqab (lit. 'cognomen') was bestowed on the 20th of Rabi al-Akhar, 1347 AH, in Surat. The day of Burhanuddin's meethaq.
- The One who is Praised and Commended (محمد): Taher Saifuddin mentioned that he chose the name Mohammed, following in the footsteps of his predecessor, Abdeali Saifuddin, who named his son Mohammed; and took the kunyat (lit. 'teknonym') Abu Mohammed.
- The Delight of the Eye of the Imam of the Pious (قرة عين امام المتقين): Bestowed on 27th Zilqad al-Haraam, 1359 AH, in Madras
- The One Divinely Aided in Yemen (منصور اليمن): Bestowed on the 18th of Shabaan al-Kareem, 1381 AH, at Ghurrat al-Masajid, Mumbai.
- The Stairs of Salvation for the Ascending (سلم النجاة للمرتقين): Taher Saifuddin upon conferring nass on Burhanuddin bestowed this title to him in his Risaalah, 'Bahr Fadl Kabeer' (1352 AH).
- The Treasure of Faith (ذخيرة الدين): Taher Saifuddin upon conferring nass on Burhanuddin bestowed this title to him in his Risaalah, 'Bahr Fadl Kabeer' (1352 AH).

== Death ==
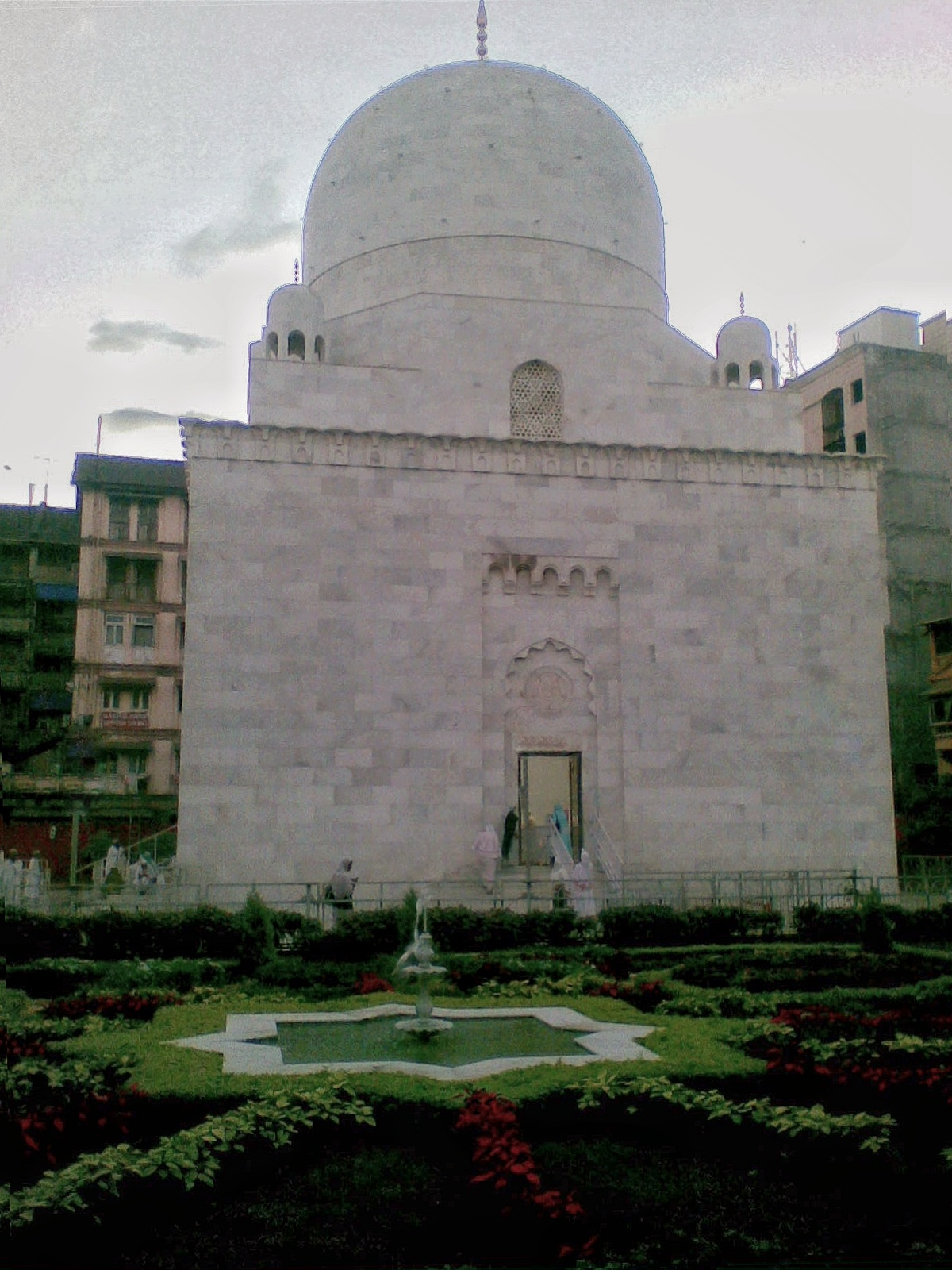
Raudat Tahera c. 2010.

Burhanuddin died of cardiac arrest at his home Saifee Mahal in Mumbai on 17 January 2014. The Bohra community announced a 40-day mourning period in respect of the departed leader. His second son and successor, Mufaddal Saifuddin led the Salat al-Janazah (lit. 'funeral procession') of his father at Ghurrat al-Masajid, after which he was buried at Raudat Tahera besides his father Taher Saifuddin. The Indian flag was flown at half-mast as a mark of state mourning.

The day after his demise, a crowd of supporters peacefully assembled outside his residence to pay their respects; Unfortunately, when the gates were opened to let them in, a human stampede ensued, killing eighteen people. A commemoration service held one year after Burhanuddin's death drew an estimated three hundred thousand bohras to Mumbai; two dedicated townships were built specially to accommodate them.

== Succession ==
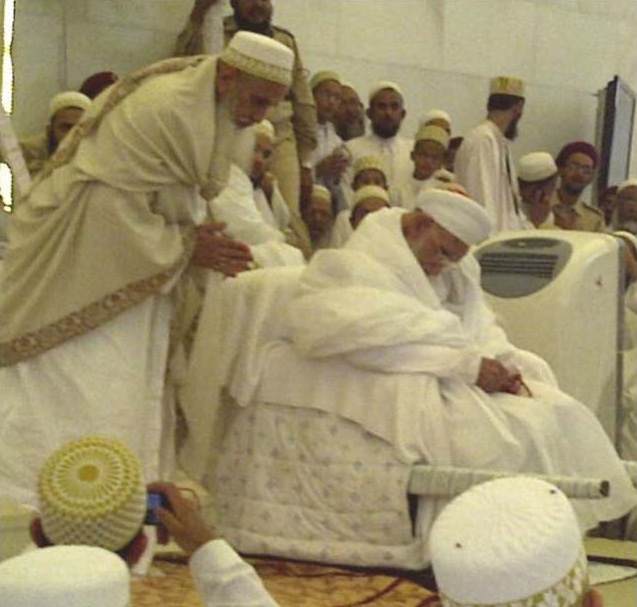
Burhanuddin confers nass on his son Saifuddin at a gathering at Raudat Tahera, 2011.

Mohammed Burhanuddin died in January 2014. As per the tenets of the sect each predecessor is required to nominate his successor during his lifetime. His death sparked a succession crisis where two rival claimants emerged for the title of 53rd Dā'ī al-Mutlaq: his son, Mufaddal Saifuddin, and his half-brother, Khuzaima Qutbuddin, who was previously Mazoon of the Dawoodi Bohra.

The challenge created a divide in the community with the vast majority aligning with Mufaddal Saifuddin whilst a small number aligned with Khuzaima Qutbuddin. Mufaddal Saifuddin assumed control of the Dawoodi Bohra administration and infrastructure. He is largely accepted as the Bohras' leader by governments and other public bodies. The UK Charity Commission has stated in writing, that "our view is that His Holiness Syedna Mufaddal Saifuddin is the current incumbent of the office of Dai al-Mutlaq."

== Genealogy ==
Burhanuddin is a descendant of leaders of the early Fatimid mission in India, Fakhr al-Din Shaheed, Abd al-Qadir Hakim al-din, Khanji Pheer, and Syedi Lukman.The family tree shown below illustrate the clear link.

== Notable works ==
=== Rasāʾil Ramaḍāniyya (Epistles) ===
The following are a list of Risalah Ramadaniyya composed by Mohammed Burhanuddin. Each Risalah is given a title according to Abjad numerals equivalent to the Hijri year of its publication:

ID	Title	Title (English)	Hijri	Pub.	Year
SMB 00	حكمة الغيبة الحقيقية	Hikmat al-Ghaybah al-Haqiqiyyah	1385H		
SMB 01	استفتاح زبد المعارف	Isteftah Zubad al-Ma'arif	1385H	1386H	
SMB 02	فيوضات الجنة	Fuyoodhaat al-Jannah	1386H		
SMB 03	سلام نضرة النعيم	Salaam Nadrah al-Na'eem	1387H		
SMB 04	ذات النور	Zaat al-Noor	1388H		
SMB 05	ظهور مجد الفاطميين	Zuhoor Majd al-Fatimiyeen	1389H		
SMB 06	بركة صبغة الله	Barakah Sibghah Allah	1390H		
SMB 07	نشر الخير	Nashr al-Khayr	1391H	1437H	2017
SMB 08	ندى الفيوضات	Nadā al-Fūyūdāt	1392H	1438H	2018
SMB09	سلسبيل روض القدس	Salsabīl Rawd al-Quds	1393H	01.10.1439H	2019
SMB10	بركات دعاة الستر	Barakāt Duāt al-Satr	1394H	01.10.1440H	2020

== Notes ==
Shia Islam titles
Mohammed Burhanuddin Dā'ī al-Mutlaq Born: 6 March 1915 Died: 17 January 2014
Preceded by Taher Saifuddin	52nd Dā'ī al-Mutlaq; 1965-2014	Succeeded by Mufaddal Saifuddin
