= MSB Educational Institute =

Al-Madrasatus Saifiyatul Burhaniyah Educational Institute
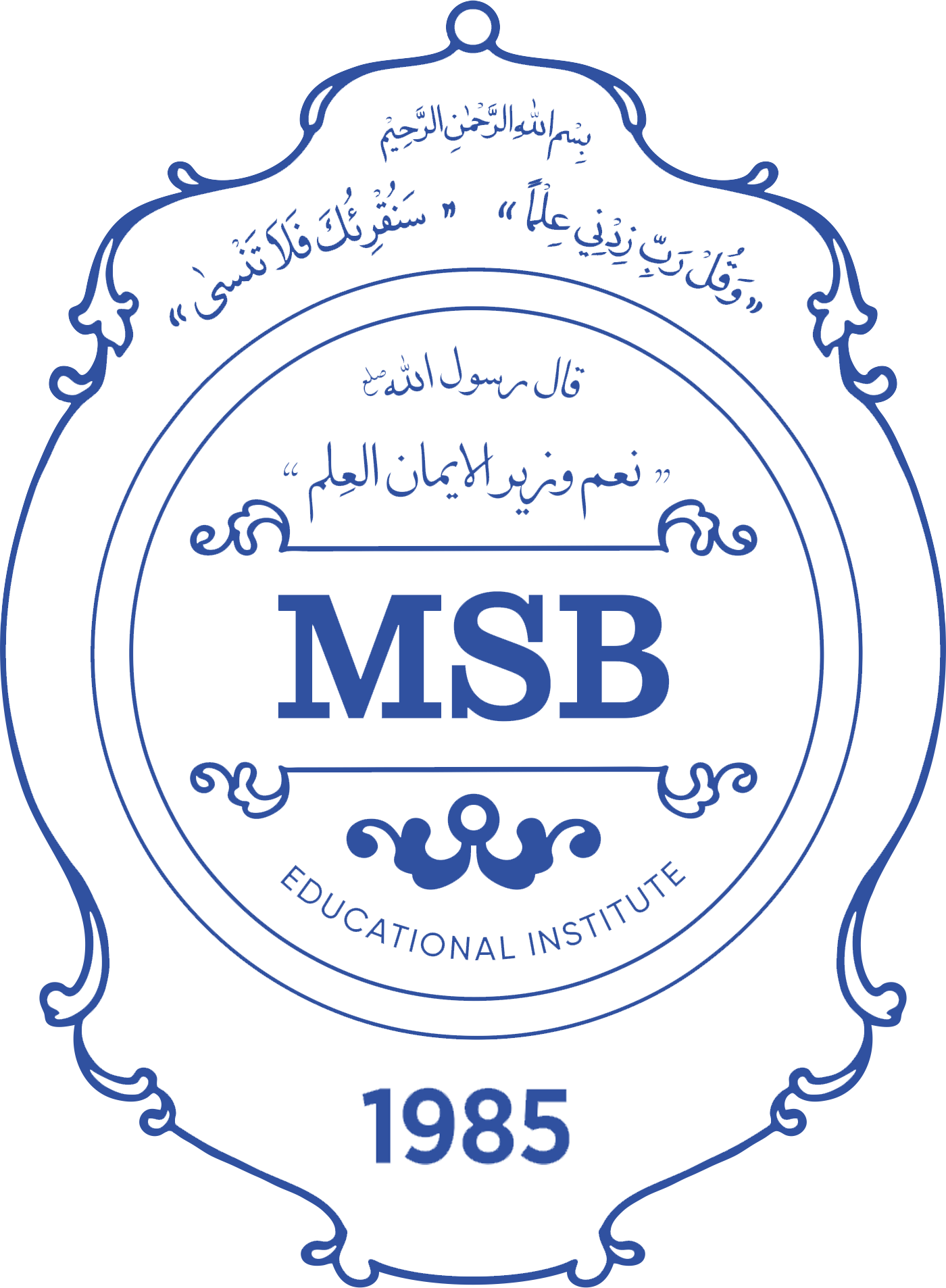

Information
- Type: Private school
- Motto: نعم وزير الايمان العلم (Note: (lit. 'the best assistant to faith is knowledge') Taken from the Hadith which in full is, "The best assistant to faith is knowledge and the best assistant to knowledge is forbearance and the best assistant to forbearance is compassion and the best assistant to compassion is patience.")
- Established: 1985
- Enrollment: 12,013
- Campus: 24 in: India; Kenya; Kuwait; Madagascar; Pakistan; Tanzania; United Arab Emirates
- Affiliations: ICSE; IGCSE
- Website: www.msbinstitute.com

MSB Educational Institute (also known as Al-Madrasatus Saifiyatul Burhaniyah Educational Institute) is an Islamic educational institute headquartered in India. It was founded by Mohammed Burhanuddin II in 1985, with its first two branches in Mumbai, India and Nairobi, Kenya. It is accredited with the ICSE and IGCSE educational boards and is operated under the purview of the office of the Dai al-Mutlaq of the Dawoodi Bohras. The institute has branches in 25 cities in 7 countries across India, Pakistan, East Africa, and the Middle East.

== History ==
Islamic prophet Muhammad made it equally incumbent, upon every Muslim man and woman, to pursue knowledge. In the Dawoodi Bohras community, both religious and secular education is highly valued. The community has a very high rate of literacy and there is no disparity between the opportunities to learn between boys or girls. As part of this philosophy, MSB Educational Institute teaches an integrated syllabus of sciences, humanities, languages, and theological subjects with equal numbers of girls and boys.

In 2017, Mufaddal Saifuddin inaugurated the MSB branch in Kuwait, which is largest MSB branch in the world at 1600 students.

== Campuses ==
As of 2022, there are 24 branches of MSB worldwide with 12,013 students.

| est. (ھـ) | City | Country | Continent | Student |
|---|---|---|---|---|
| 1405 | Nairobi | Kenya | Africa | 397 |
| 1405 | Mumbai | India | Asia | 647 |
| 1405 | Shabbirabad, Karachi | Pakistan | Asia | 616 |
| 1406 | Dubai | United Arab Emirates | Asia | 881 |
| 1406 | Mombasa | Kenya | Africa | 264 |
| 1407 | Indore | India | Asia | 890 |
| 1407 | Nashik | India | Asia | 443 |
| 1408 | Bangalore | India | Asia | 336 |
| 1408 | Kolkata | India | Asia | 255 |
| 1409 | Godhra | India | Asia | 774 |
| 1411 | Dar es Salaam | Tanzania | Africa | 485 |
| 1412 | Raipur | India | Asia | 139 |
| 1413 | Nagpur | India | Asia | 469 |
| 1413 | Chennai | India | Asia | 800 |
| 1414 | Secunderabad | India | Asia | 340 |
| 1418 | Rajkot | India | Asia | 364 |
| 1420 | Bhopal | India | Asia | 321 |
| 1424 | Tananarive | Madagascar | Africa | 269 |
| 1424 | Pune | India | Asia | 503 |
| 1425 | Hyderi, Karachi | Pakistan | Asia | 698 |
| 1427 | Mahboula | Kuwait | Asia | 1,075 |
| 1427 | Banswara | India | Asia | 861 |
| 1434 | Kota | India | Asia | 153 |
| 1438 | Vasai | India | Asia | 123 |
