= Risalah Ramadaniyya =

Treatise within Islam by Da'i al-Mutlaq

Risalah Arabic (رسـالـة) is the Arabic word for a treatise or philosophical prose within Islam. In Tayyibi Isma'ilism, Rasāʾil Ramaḍāniyya refers to the works composed by the Da'i al-Mutlaq for the most part during the month of Ramadan.

== Style ==
Each Risalah is essentially divided into two sections: the first contains supplication and eulogy, and the second, a variety of topics that generally conforms to the overarching theme of the Risalah. Each Risalah (epistle) is given a title gematrically equivalent to the Hijri year of its publication: "The context of the quoted texts is not left to the reader to determine, as in the two above-mentioned anthologies. Each text is preceded or followed by a commentary placing it within a specific theme or issue, such as the daʿwa hierarchy under the imams and dāʿīs, the nature of the authority of the dāʿī and the daʿwa dignitaries (ḥudūd), and the role and place of the believers in this world. In addition, each Risāla begins with the traditional introductory taḥmīd, original poems in praise of the Prophet and the imams, and extensive supplications showing a rhetorical mastery of the Arabic language. The Risālas typically end with opinions on legal matters by the author or by previous dāʿīs and daʿwa dignitaries."

== Authors ==
=== Syedna Taher Saifuddin ===
Syedna Taher Saifuddin "probably had more Ismāʿīlī texts at his disposal than any other Ṭayyibī scholar before him. The wealth and variety of quoted texts make the Rasāʾil al-Ramaḍāniyya a treasure trove of writings, which are otherwise inaccessible to non-initiates and low-ranking daʿwa officials."

A set of the Rasāʾil were presented to the Bodleian Library in the University of Oxford on behalf of Syedna Taher Saifuddin 12 July 1949.

ID	Title	Title (English)	Hijri	Pub.	Year
STS 01	ضوء نور الحق المبين	Ḍawʾ nūr al-ḥaqq al-mubīn	1335		
STS 02	ثمرات علوم الهدى	Thamarāt ʿulūm al-hudā	1337		
STS 03	زهر الرياض الازلية	Zahr al-riyāḍ al-azaliyya	1338		
STS 04	درر البشارات	Durar al-bišhārāt	1339		
STS 05	المشرب الكوثري	Al-Mašhrab al-kawtharī	1340		
STS 06	درر الهدى المضيئة	Durar al-hudā al-muḍīʾa	1341		
STS 07	روض عالم القدس	Rawḍ ʿālam al-quds	1342		
STS 08	غرفة جنة	Ġurfat Janna	1343		
STS 09	غرة الحق	Ġurrat al-ḥaqq	1344		
STS 10	ثمار جنات عدن طيبة	Ṯimār Jannāt ʿadnin ṭayyiba	1345		
STS 11	قطف شجرة خلدية	Qaṭf šaǧara ḫuldiyya	1346		
STS 12	زبدة برهان الصدق الواضح	Zubdat burhān al-ṣidq al-wāḍiḥ	1347		
STS 13	صبغ نور	Ṣibġ nūr	1348		
STS 14	غرس الجنة	Ġars al-ǧanna	1349		
STS 15	درر اسرار اْل الكرار	Durar asrār āl al-Karrār	1350		
STS 16	نور روض الجنة	Nūr rawḍ al-ǧanna	1351		
STS 17	بحر فضل كبير	Baḥr faḍl kabīr	1352		
STS 18	مسرات الفتح المبين	Masarrat al-fatḥ al-mubīn	1353		
STS 19	الباب حظيرة القدس	Al-Bāb ḥaẓīrat al-quds	1354		
STS 20	كرامة العقول الوضية	Karāmat al-ʿuqūl al-waḍiyya	1355		
STS 21	صفحة عرفات المعارف	Ṣafḥat ʿarafāt al-maʿārif	1356		
STS 22	انهار رياض الجنة	Anhār riyāḍ al-ǧanna	1357		
STS 23	سحب بركات الخلد	Suḥub barakāt al-ḫuld	1358		
STS 24	ذات البركة	Ḏāt al-baraka	1359		
STS 25	كوثر خلد	Kawṯar ḫuld	1360		
STS 26	روضة فردوس	Rawḍat firdaws	1361		
STS 27	دلو غدير حق	Dalw Ġadīr ḥaqq	1362		
STS 28	مشربة تسنيم نور	Mašrabat tasnīm nūr	1363		
STS 29	سلسبيل حكم غدق	Salsabīl ḥikam ġadaq	1364		
STS 30	سرر رشد مرفوعة	Surar rušd Marfūʿa	1365		
STS 31	صور حوض مورود	Ṣuwar ḥawḍ mawrūd	1366		
STS 32	تكبير سكينة فتح مبين	Takbīr sakīnat fatḥ mubīn	1367		
STS 33	فلسفة فوز عظيم	Falsafat fawz ʿaẓīm	1368		
STS 34	تذكرة لبيب	Taḏkirat labīb	1369		
STS 35	سلسلة نعمة عظمى	Silsilat o Nemat 8in Uzma	1370		
STS 36	نعم الصبغة الالهية	Neam us Sibghat il Ilahiya	1371		
STS 37	خزائن امام المتقين	Khazain o Imam il Muttaqeen	1372		
STS 38	مفاتيح الياقوتة الحمراء	Mafateeh ul Yaqootat il Hamra	1373		
STS 39	نهر النور الشعشعاني	Nahr un Noor ish Shashani	1374		
STS 40	بلاغ الدعاة الفاطميين	Balagh ud Duat il Fatemiyyeen	1375		
STS 41	اشعة الفيض الازلي	Asheat ul Faiz il Azali	1376		
STS 42	امثال سدرة المنتهى	Amṯāl sidrat al-muntahā	1377		
STS 43	روضة دار السلام	Rawḍat dār al-Salām	1378	19.07.1430H	2009
STS 44	توحيد الملة البيضاء	Tawḥīd al-Millah al-Bayḍāʾ	1379	19.07.1431H	2010
STS 45	بركات اصحاب التطهير	Barakāt Aṣḥāb al-Taṭhīr	1380	19.09.1432H	2011
STS 46	كمال النعم السابغة	Kamāl al-Niam al-Sābiġa	1381	1433	2012
STS 47	تسبيح ذهب القدس	Tasbīḥ ḏahab al-Quds	1382	23.09.1434H	2013
STS 48	شموس بركات الربانيين	Shumūs Barakāt al-Rabbāniyīn	1383	23.09.1435H	2015
STS 49	انهار فيوض الفاطميين	Anhār Fūyūz al-Fātimiyyīn	1384	10.12.1436H	2016

=== Syedna Mohammed Burhanuddin ===
ID	Title	Title (English)	Hijri	Pub.	Year
SMB00	حكمة الغيبة الحقيقية	Hikmat al-Ghaybah al-Haqiqiyyah	1385H	19.07.1430H	2009
SMB01	استفتاح زبد المعارف	Isteftah Zubad al-Ma'arif	1385H	1386H	
SMB02	فيوضات الجنة	Fuyoodhaat al-Jannah	1386H	19.07.1430H	2009
SMB03	سلام نضرة النعيم	Salaam Nadrah al-Na'eem	1387H	19.07.1431H	2010
SMB04	ذات النور	Zaat al-Noor	1388H	19.09.1432H	2011
SMB05	ظهور مجد الفاطميين	Zuhoor Majd al-Fatimiyeen	1389H	1433H	2012
SMB06	بركة صبغة الله	Barakah Sibghah Allah	1390H	23.09.1434H	2013
SMB07	نشر الخير	Nashr al-Khayr	1391H	01.10.1437H	2017
SMB08	ندى الفيوضات	Nadā al-Fūyūdāt	1392H	01.10.1438H	2018
SMB09	سلسبيل روض القدس	Salsabīl Rawd al-Quds	1393H	01.10.1439H	2019
SMB10	بركات دعاة الستر	Barakāt Duāt al-Satr	1394H	01.10.1440H	2020

=== Syedna Mufaddal Saifuddin ===
ID	Title	Title (English)	Hijri	Pub	Year
SMS00	حكمة الغيبة القدسانية الابدية	Hikmah al-Ghaybah al-Qudsāniyyah al-Abadiyyah	1435H	19.07.1436H	2015
SMS01	شكر نعم اصحاب البركات	Shukr Ne’am As’hāb al-Barakāt	1436H	27.06.1437H	2016
SMS02	جامعة ثمرات العلوم	Jāmiʿah Samarāt al-ʿUlūm	1437H	27.06.1438H	2017
SMS03	فيوضات يمنية طيبة	Fūyūdāt Yamaniyyah Taiyyebah	1438H	27.06.1439H	2018
SMS04	ملتقى سفينة البركات	Multaqā Safīnah al-Barakāt	1439H	27.06.1440H	2019
SMS05	دفينة مفاخر ال النبي الطهر	Dafīnah Mafākhir āl al-Nabi al-Tuhr	1440H	19.07.1441H	2020
