= Saifee Masjid =

Mosque in South Mumbai, Maharashtra, India

Saifee Mosque
- सैफी मशीद
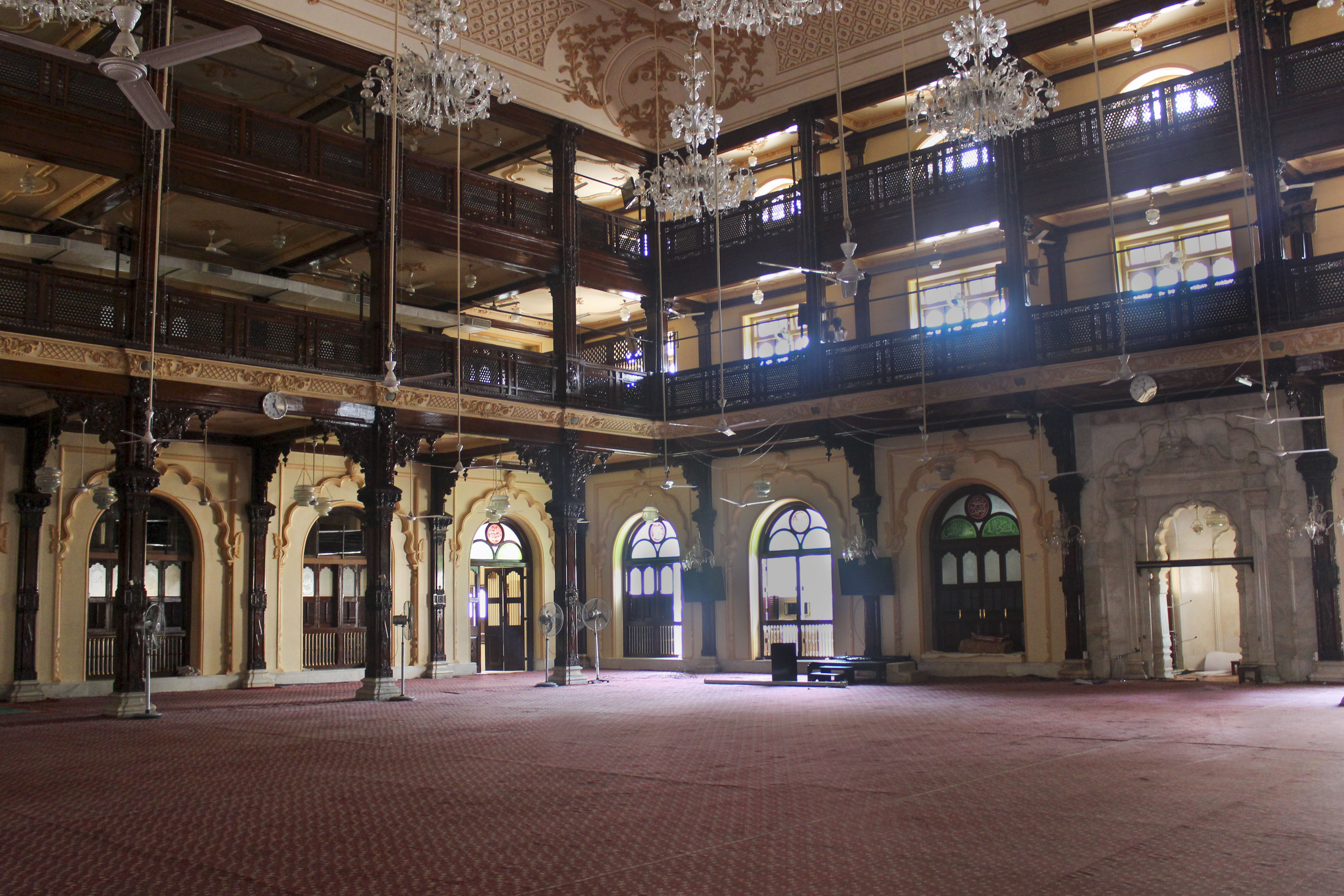
- The mosque interior in 2014, before redevelopment by Saifee Burhani Upliftment Trust

- Location of the mosque in Mumbai

Religion
- Affiliation: Shia Islam
- Sect: Dawoodi Bohra
- Ecclesiastical or organizational status: Mosque
- Status: Active

Location
- Location: Bhendi Bazaar, South Mumbai, Maharashtra
- Country: India
- Interactive map of Saifee Mosque
- Coordinates: 18°57′31″N 72°49′49″E

Architecture
- Type: Mosque architecture
- Style: Indigenous Indian; Indo-Islamic; Neoclassical
- Founder: Syedna Taher Saifuddin
- Groundbreaking: 1923
- Completed: 1926

Specifications
- Length: 34.5 m (113 ft)
- Width: 26.7 m (88 ft)
- Height (max): 15.1 m (50 ft)
- Minaret: Two

The Saifee Masjid, officially known as the Ghurrat ul Masajid, is a Dawoodi Bohra Shi'a mosque, located in the Bhendi Bazaar area of South Mumbai, in the state of Maharashtra, India. The mosque was constructed by Taher Saifuddin in the early 20th century.

== History ==
The 51st leader of the Dawoodi Bohras, Syedna Taher Saifuddin built Saifee Masjid in 1926, and it was the largest community mosque of that time. Syedna Taher Saifuddin laid the foundation stone of the mosque on May 6, 1923 (21 Ramadan, 1341 Hijri) and inaugurated the completed mosque in a period of three years on March 9, 1926 (25 Shaban 1344 AH).

Saifuddin delivered sixteen Ashara Mubaraka sermons in this mosque, and his son, Mohammed Burhanuddin, the 52nd leader, delivered thirteen Ashara Mubaraka sermons. In 2011, Burhanuddin delivered his 100th birthday discourses.

The foundation stone for reconstructing the mosque was laid in 2018 by Syedna Mufaddal Saifuddin as part of the Bhendi Bazaar redevelopment project undertaken by Saifee Burhani Upliftment Trust. Mufaddal Saifuddin inaugurated the reconstructed mosque on September 25, 2023.

On June 30, 2025, Syedna Mufaddal Saifuddin delivered a sermon in this mosque invoking religious faith.

== Architecture ==
The Saifee Masjid consists of a mixture of various architectural styles, including Indigenous Indian, Indo-Islamic, and Neoclassical architecture. The mosque measures 34.5 metres (113 ft) long and 26.7 metres (88 ft) wide, and 15.1 metres (50 ft) high; and is able to accommodate approximately 5,000 worshippers.

The two minarets at each corner of the mosque are adorned with ornamentation. This design has been taken from, Taj Masjid in Morbi, Gujarat, built by Taj Mithaiwala, a resident of Morbi who migrated to Mumbai. He made enough wealth to build this masjid through his mithai shop - Taj Sweets located in Bombay. The Waqf was done by the 43rd Dai Syedna Abdeali Saifuddin.

Burmese teakwood, from the original mosque, was reinstalled in the doors, windows, columns and beams. The walls are adorned with Quranic verses, ornate floral motifs and decorative patterns. Chandeliers are designed and hand-crafted in the former Republic of Republic of Czechoslovakia. Marble, quarried from Makrana in Rajasthan, and intricate mosaics were used to embellish various parts of the mosque.

The main entrance is inspired by the design of Bab ul-Futuh.

The mosque has a rainwater harvesting system along with a sewage treatment plant. The lights in the utility building are powered entirely by solar panels. Date palm trees provide natural shade in the courtyard.

== See also ==
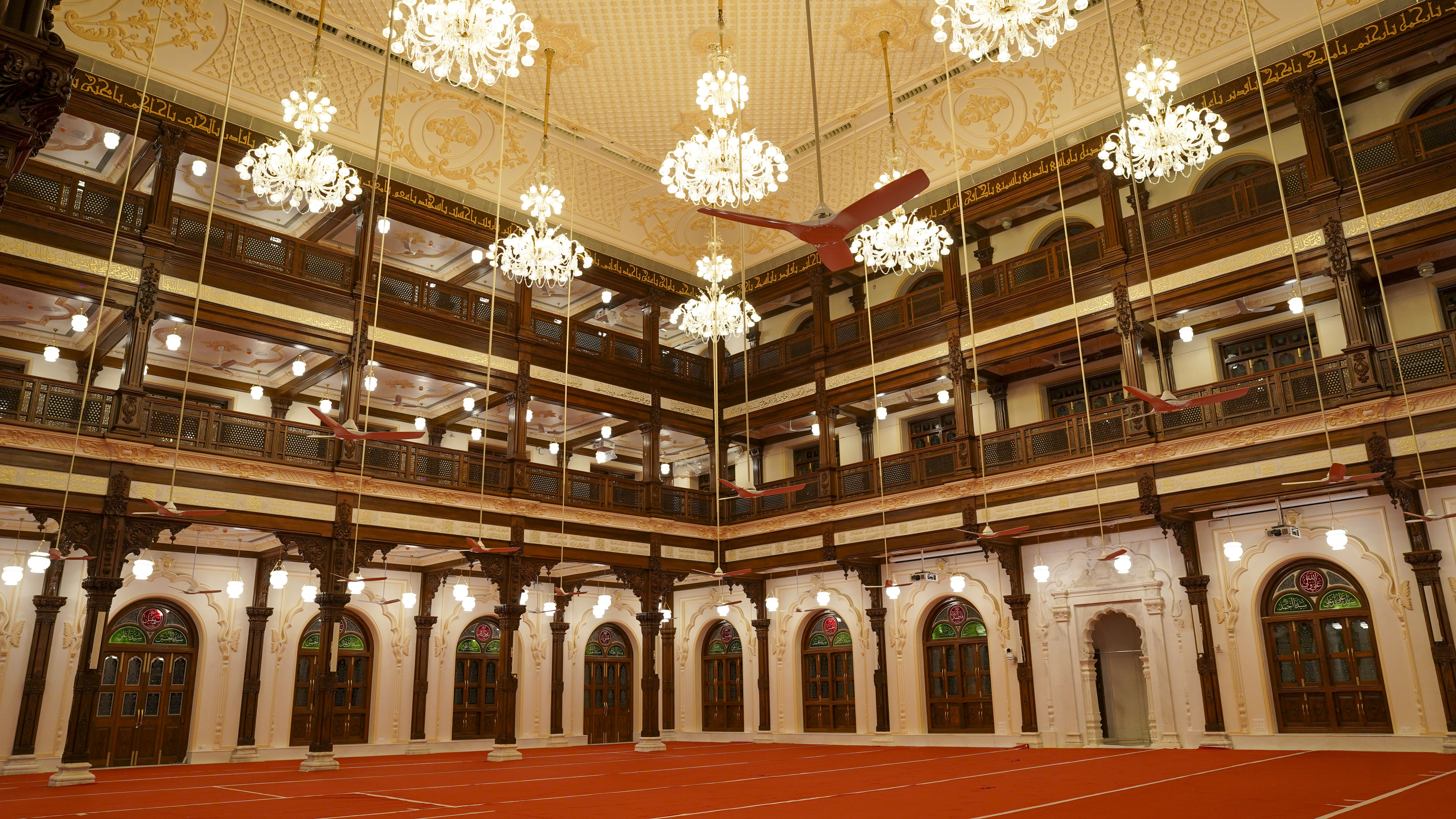
The mosque interior in 2023, following redevelopment. The project provided modern amenities and preserved the original design and architectural elements.

- Shia Islam in India
- List of mosques in India
