= Al Sa'adah Towers =

Building in Mumbai, India

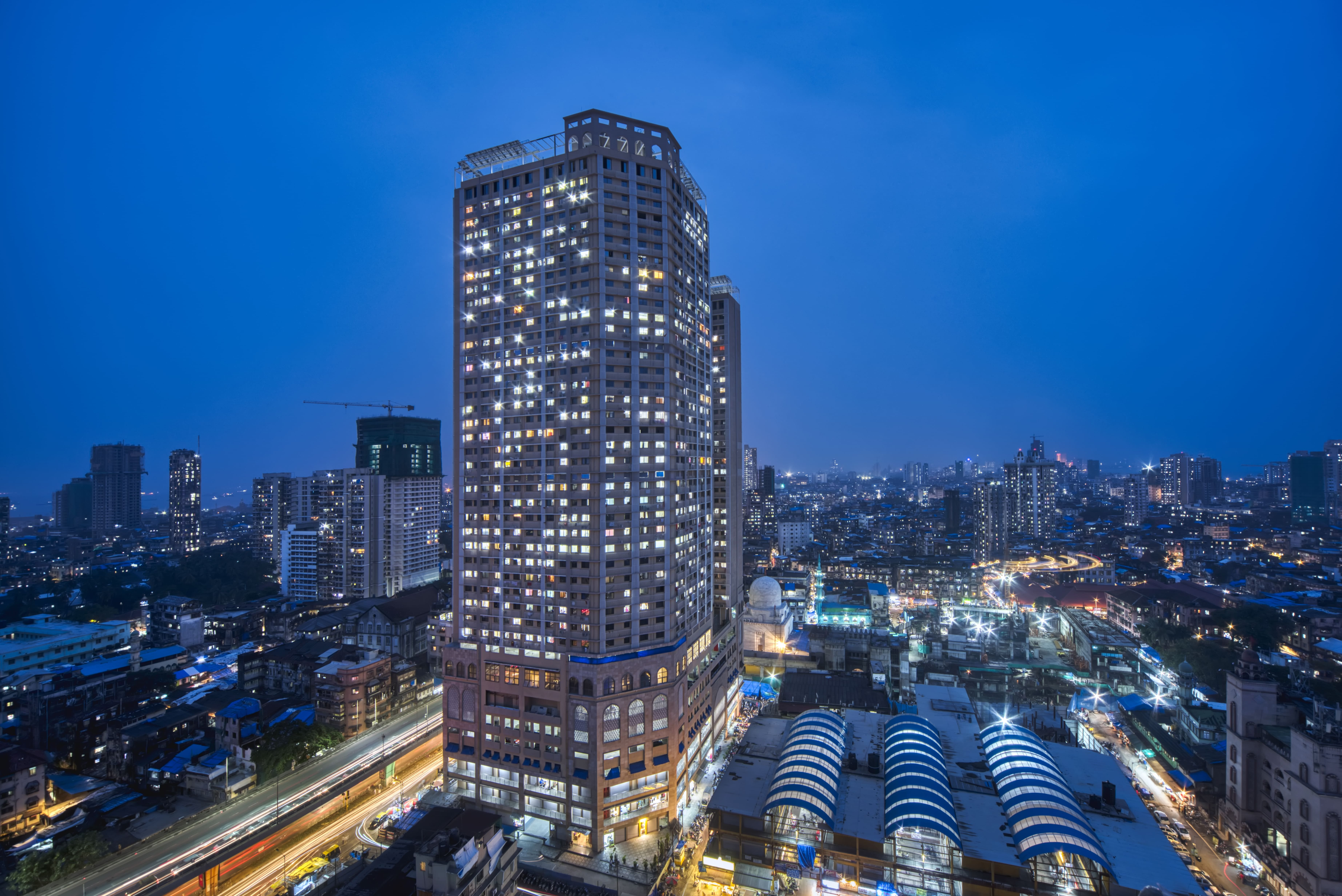
- Interactive map of the Al Sa'adah Towers area

General information
- Status: Completed
- Location: Mumbai, India
- Coordinates: 18°57′33.88″N 72°49′53.6″E

Height
- Height: 140 metres (460 ft) (Tower A); 150 metres (490 ft) (Tower B)

Technical details
- Floor count: 36 (Tower A); 41 (Tower B)

Al Sa'adah Towers are twin high rise buildings in the Bhendi Bazaar neighborhood of Mumbai, India.

== History ==
The towers were constructed by Saifee Burhani Upliftment Trust, which was launched by Mohammed Burhanuddin to undertake the cluster redevelopment of the Bhendi Bazaar area.

The project was conceived in 2009, and the first phase was completed in 2019. Al Sa'adah is constructed on one acre of land, where 13 old and dilapidated buildings had stood.

== Description ==
Tower A has 36 floors while Tower B has 41 floors. The ground, first, and second floors of the towers have commercial shops while residential flats start from the ninth floor. The mixed-use complex comprises 610 residential units and 128 shops.
