= Chor Bazaar, Mumbai =

Coordinates: 18.960321°N 72.827176°E

Chor Bazaar
- Commercial, Shopping
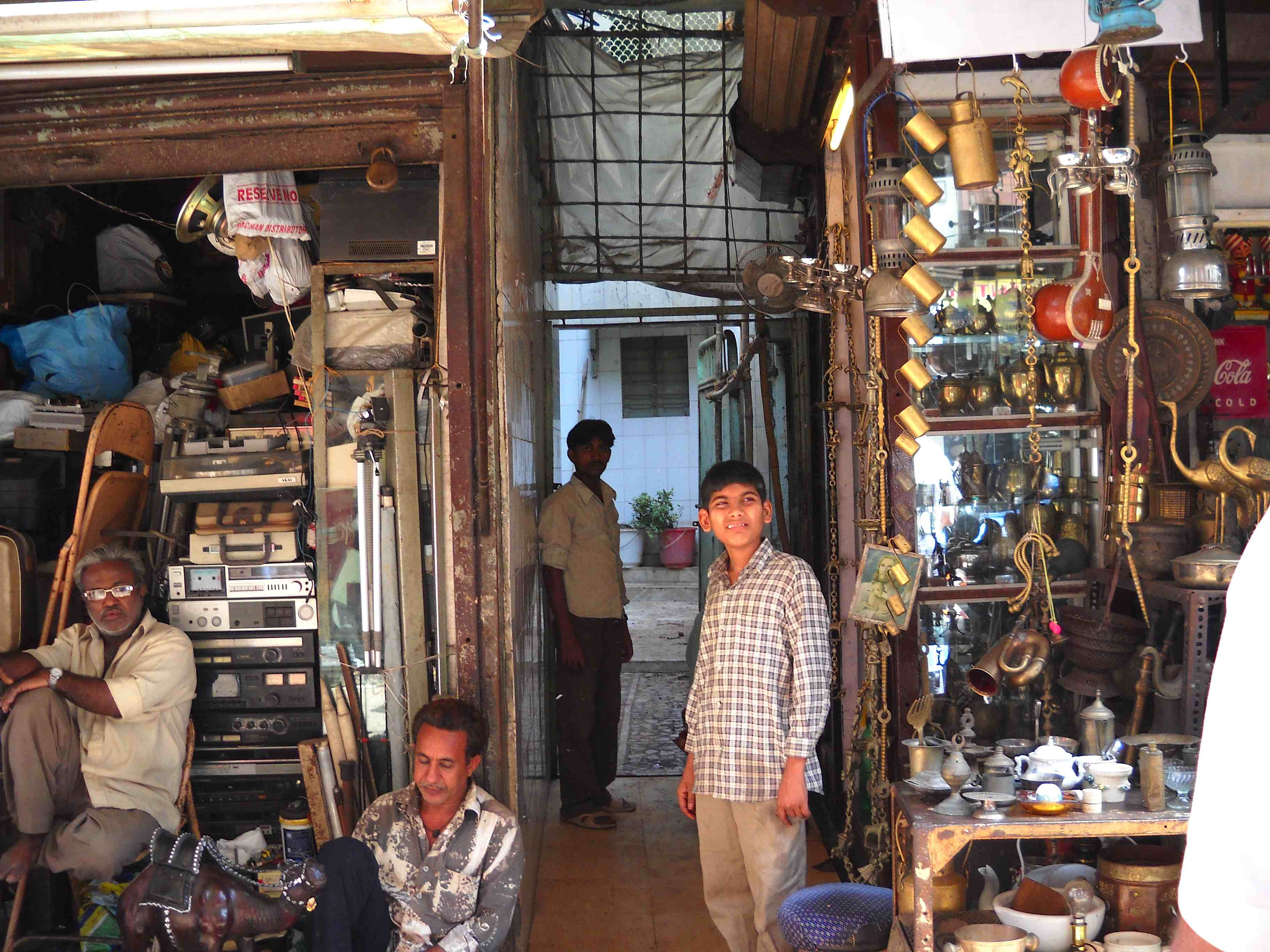
- An antique shop at Chor Bazaar, Mumbai

- Location within Mumbai
- Country: India
- State: Maharashtra
- District: Mumbai City
- City: Mumbai

Government
  - Type: Municipal Corporation
  - Body: Brihanmumbai Municipal Corporation (MCGM)

Languages
  - Official: Marathi
- Time zone: UTC+5:30 (IST)
- Area code: 022
- Civic agency: BMC

Chor Bazaar is one of the largest flea markets in India, located on Mutton Street, near Bhendi Bazaar in Grant Road, South Mumbai. The area is one of the tourist attractions of Mumbai. The word "chor" means 'thief' in Marathi, Gujarati and Hindi. According to popular legend, if you lose anything in Mumbai you can buy it back from the Chor Bazaar.

== Origin of name ==
Chor Bazaar, literally translated as Thieves' Market, was initially called Shor Bazaar, given how noisy things would get in the bustling and busy markets along the arterial Mohammed Ali Road. It is located just about a few kms away from Crawford Market in South Mumbai.

The market got called Chor Bazaar by the British, who could not pronounce the word correctly. Eventually, stolen goods and vintage items made their way into the market, and the name stayed.

== History ==
Chor Bazaar in Mumbai emerged as one of the oldest markets of second-hand goods in India since the British rule in India. In modern times, it is said to sell mostly second-hand goods rather than stolen goods. The market is now famous for antique and vintage items.

A store called Mini Market offers old Bollywood posters for sale. Others offer authentic Victorian furniture, replacement parts for automobiles, etc. Although bargains are sometimes staggering, haggling is considered mandatory. This is basically an "organized" flea market, where one has to rummage through junk to find what one wants.

A popular story about the origin of the name of the market is that a violin and some other belongings of Queen Victoria went missing while being unloaded from her ship while on a visit to Bombay, and were later found for sale in the "thieves' market".

== In popular culture ==
The market has been mentioned in popular novels, including Rohinton Mistry's Such a Long Journey, where it is described as "not a nice place". The Spool Man (2016) – a short documentary about a Chor Bazaar shop-keeper, directed by Daniel Ifans, produced by We Are Tilt. Official Selection at Ethnografilm Film festival 2019 (Paris, France).

== Gallery ==
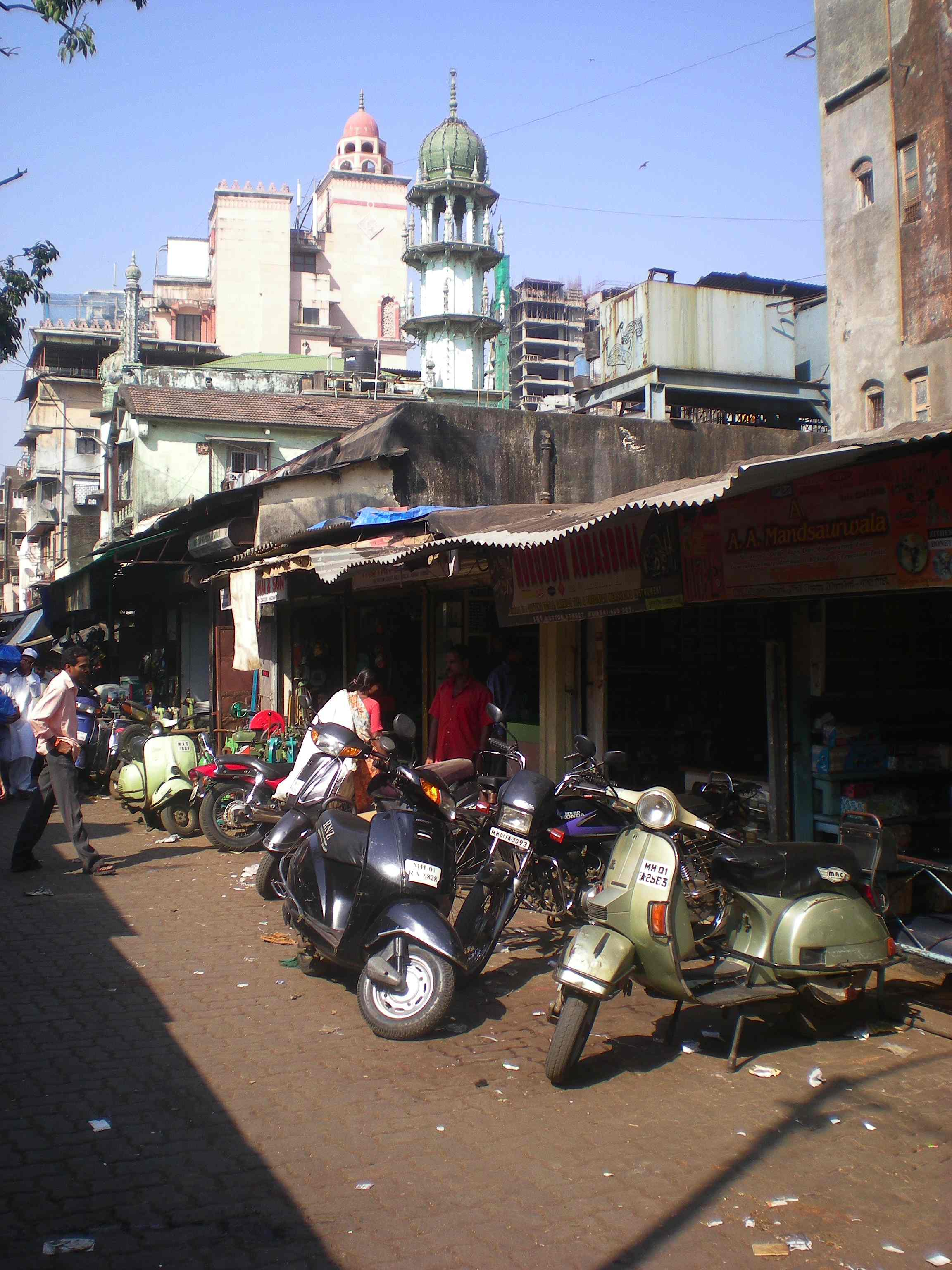
Mosque at Chor Bazaar

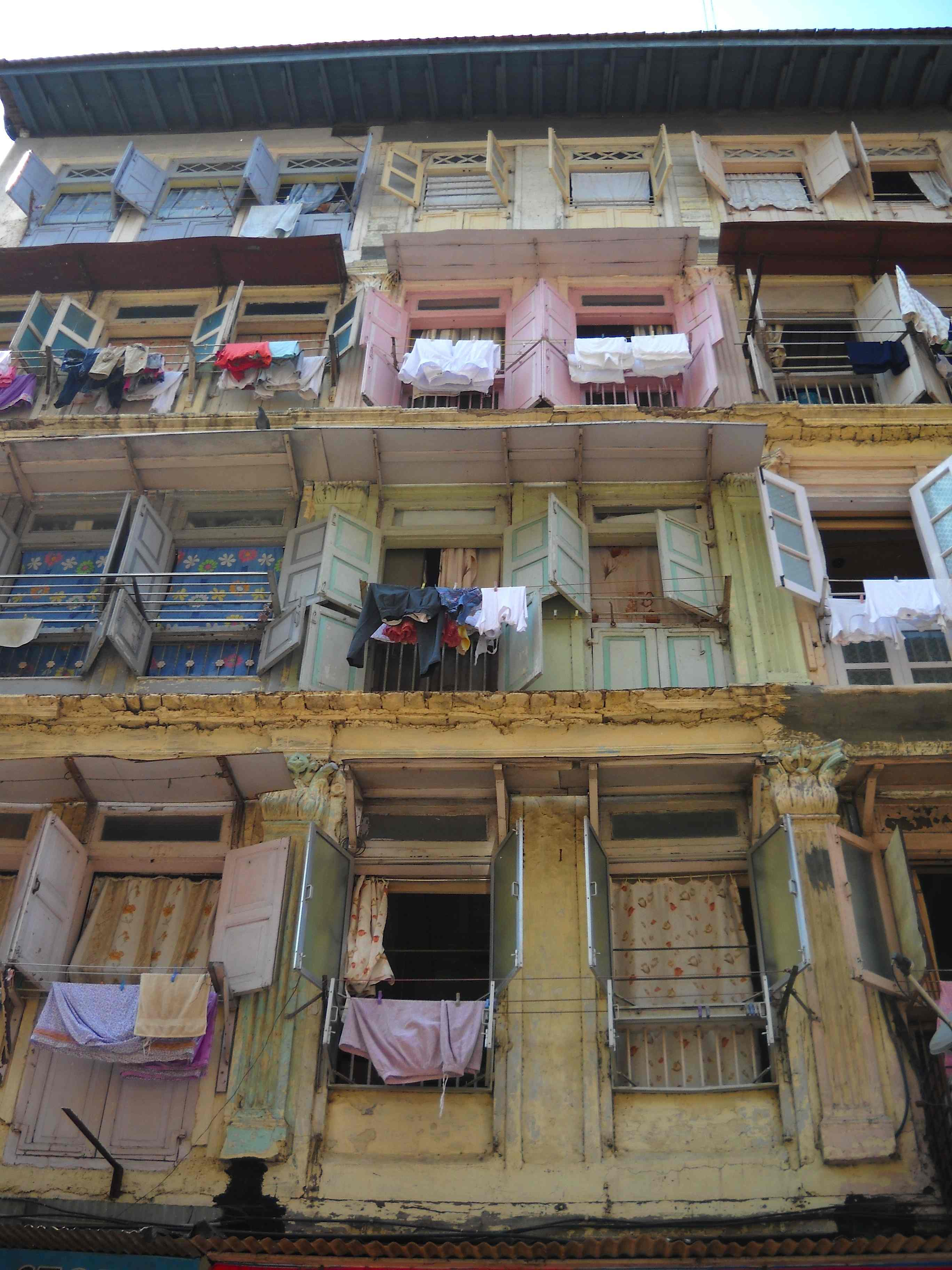
Colonial era building at Chor Bazaar

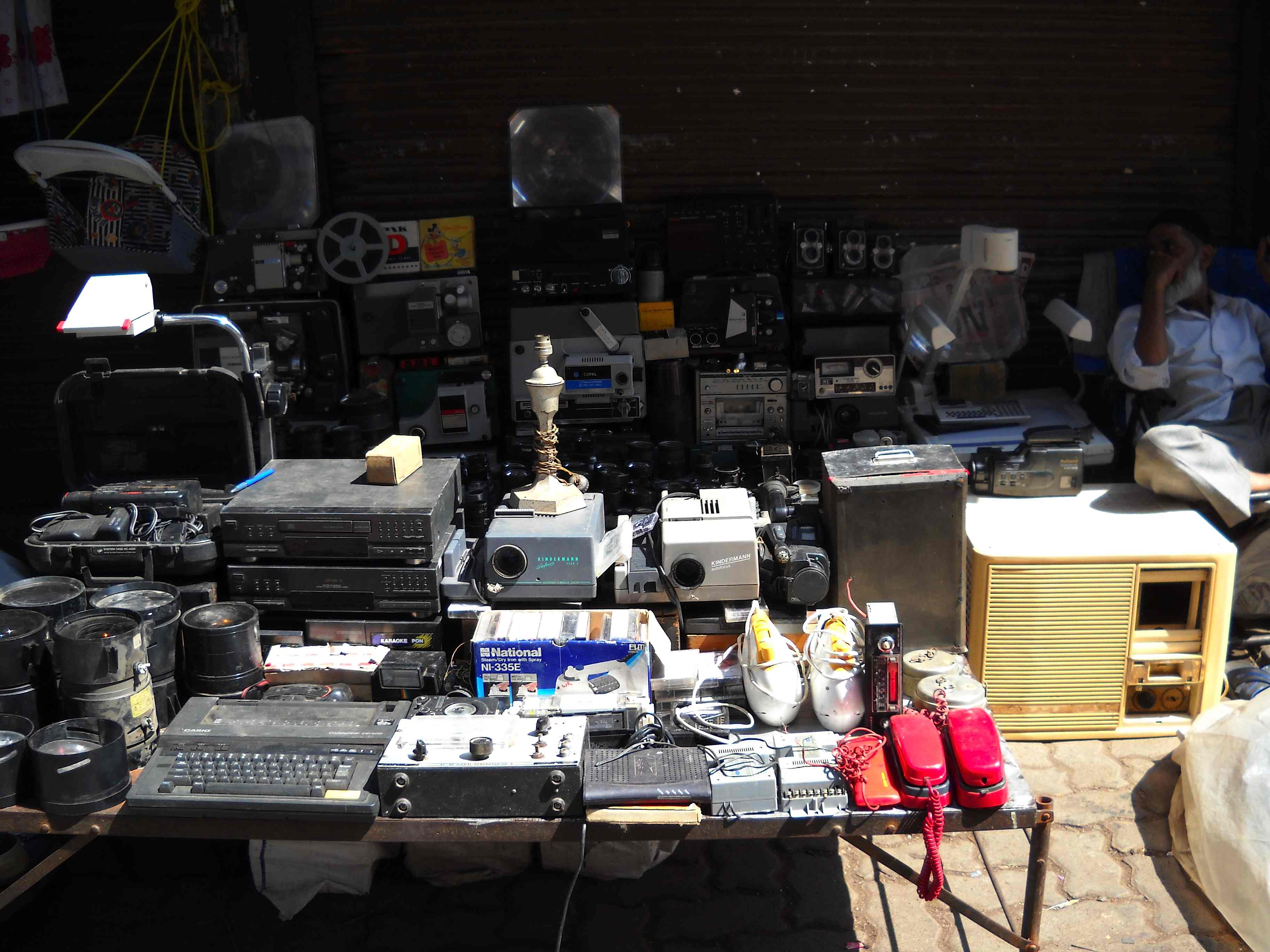
Second hand electronic goods

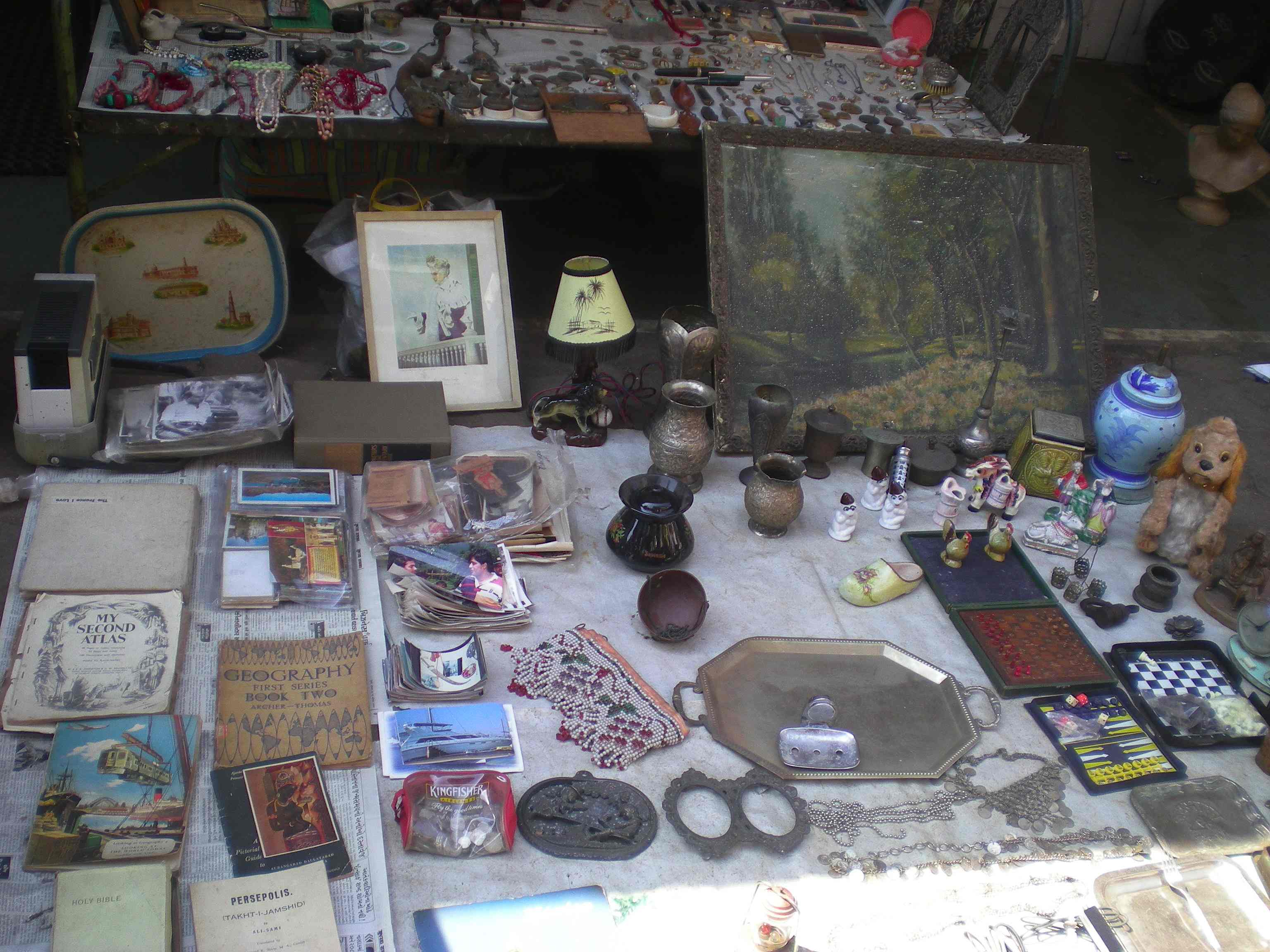
Antique items for sale

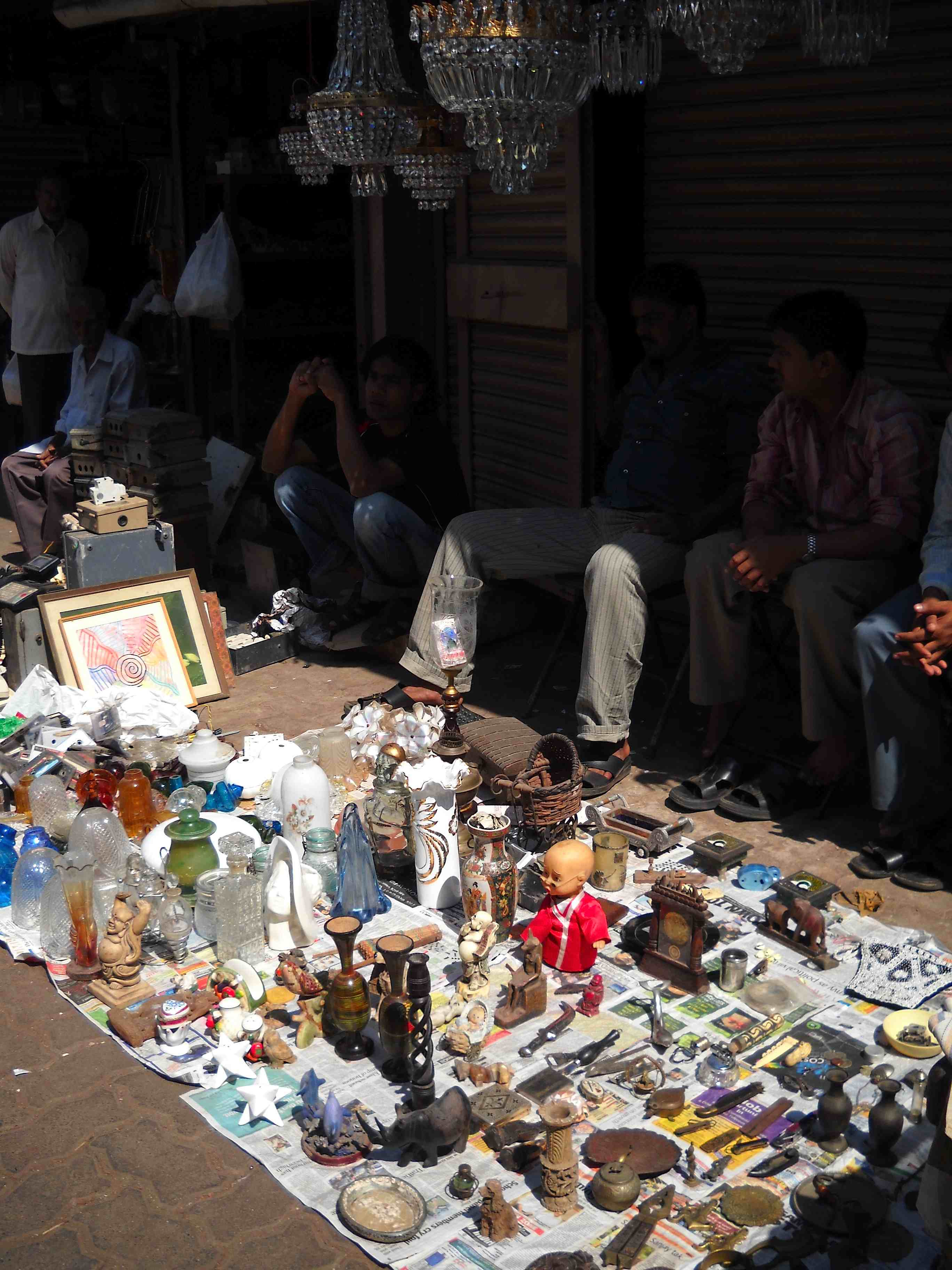
Antique items for sale

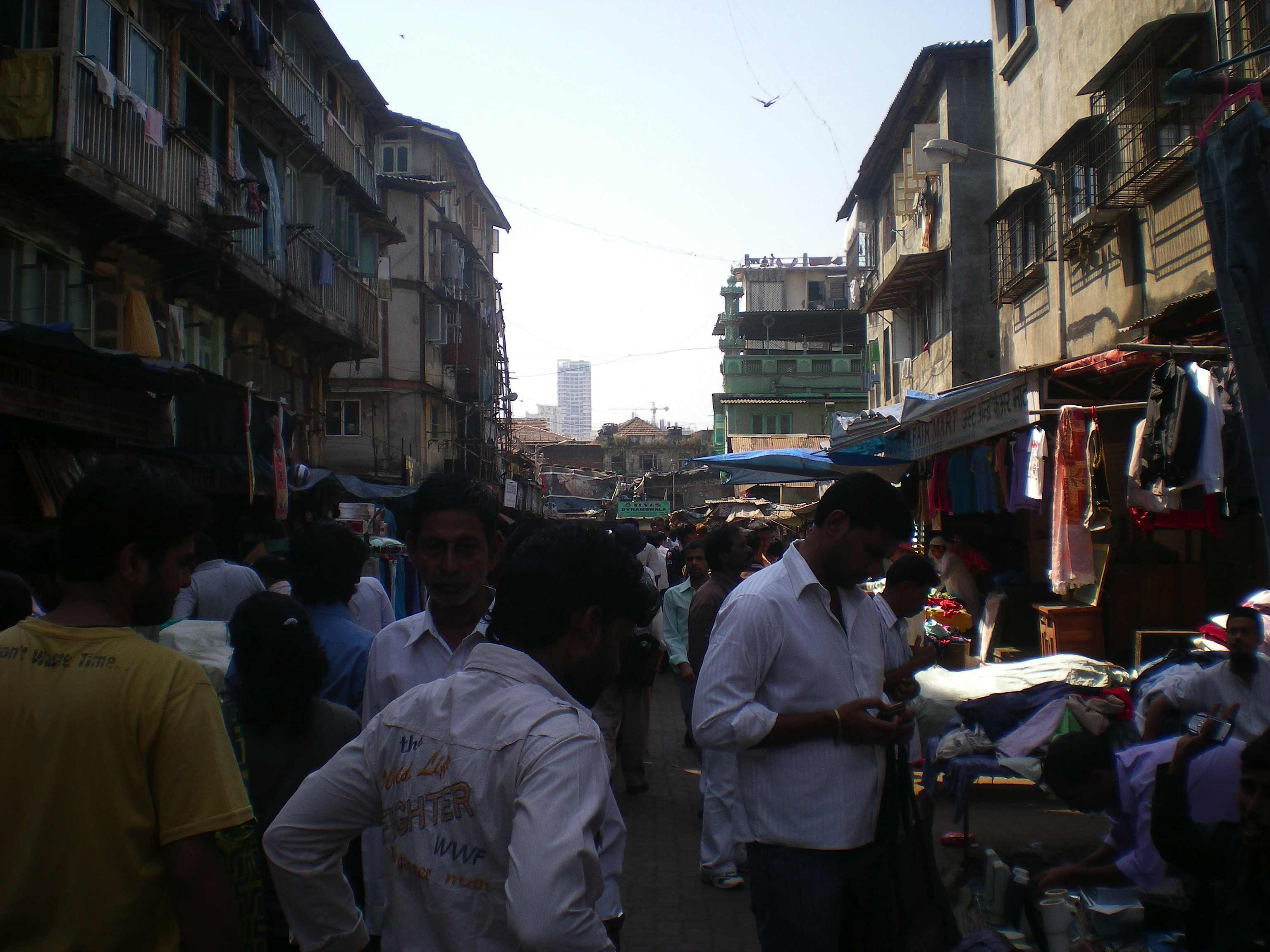
Crowd at the market in morning

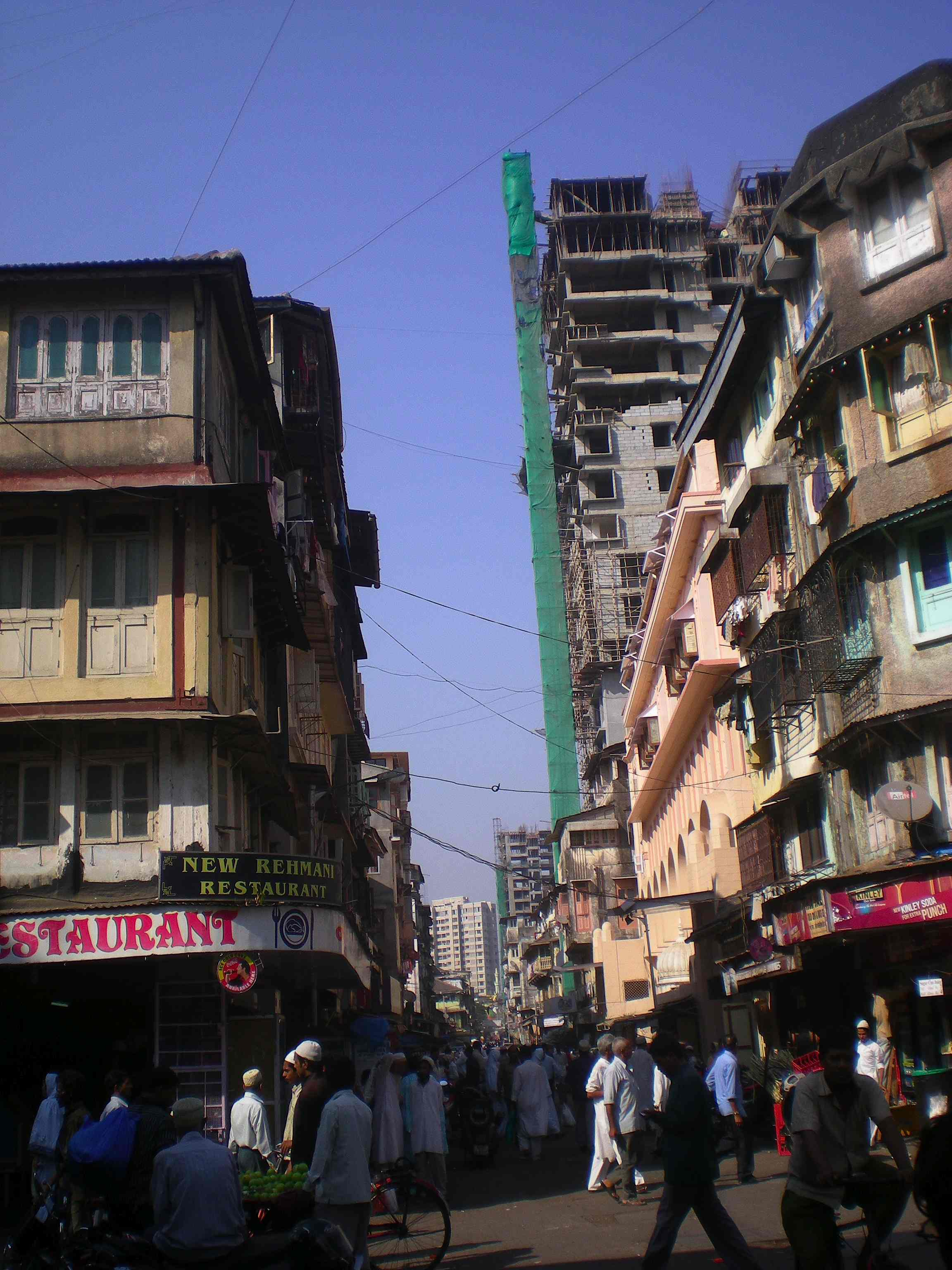
Lanes in Chor Bazaar

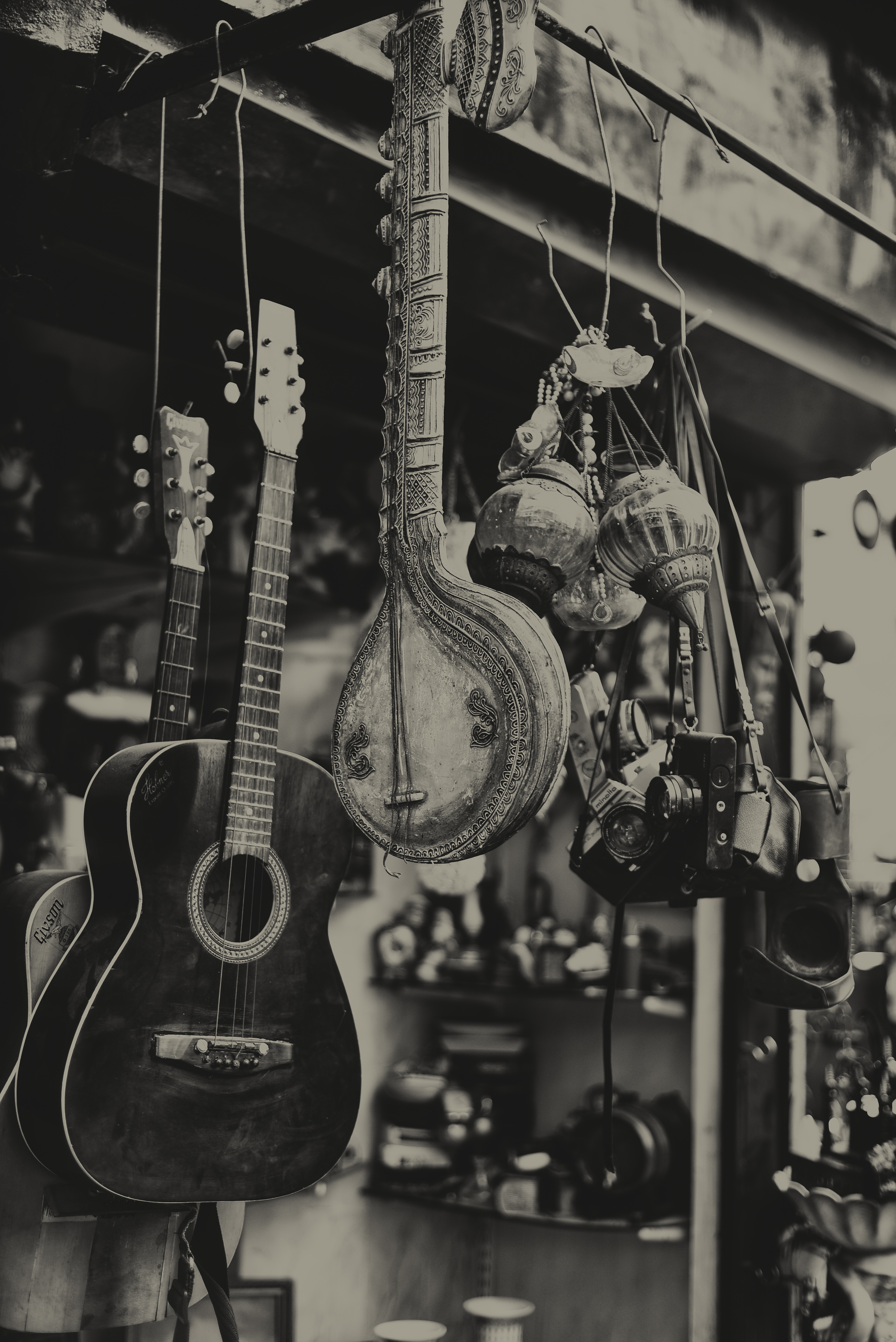
Old photograph showing guitars for sale

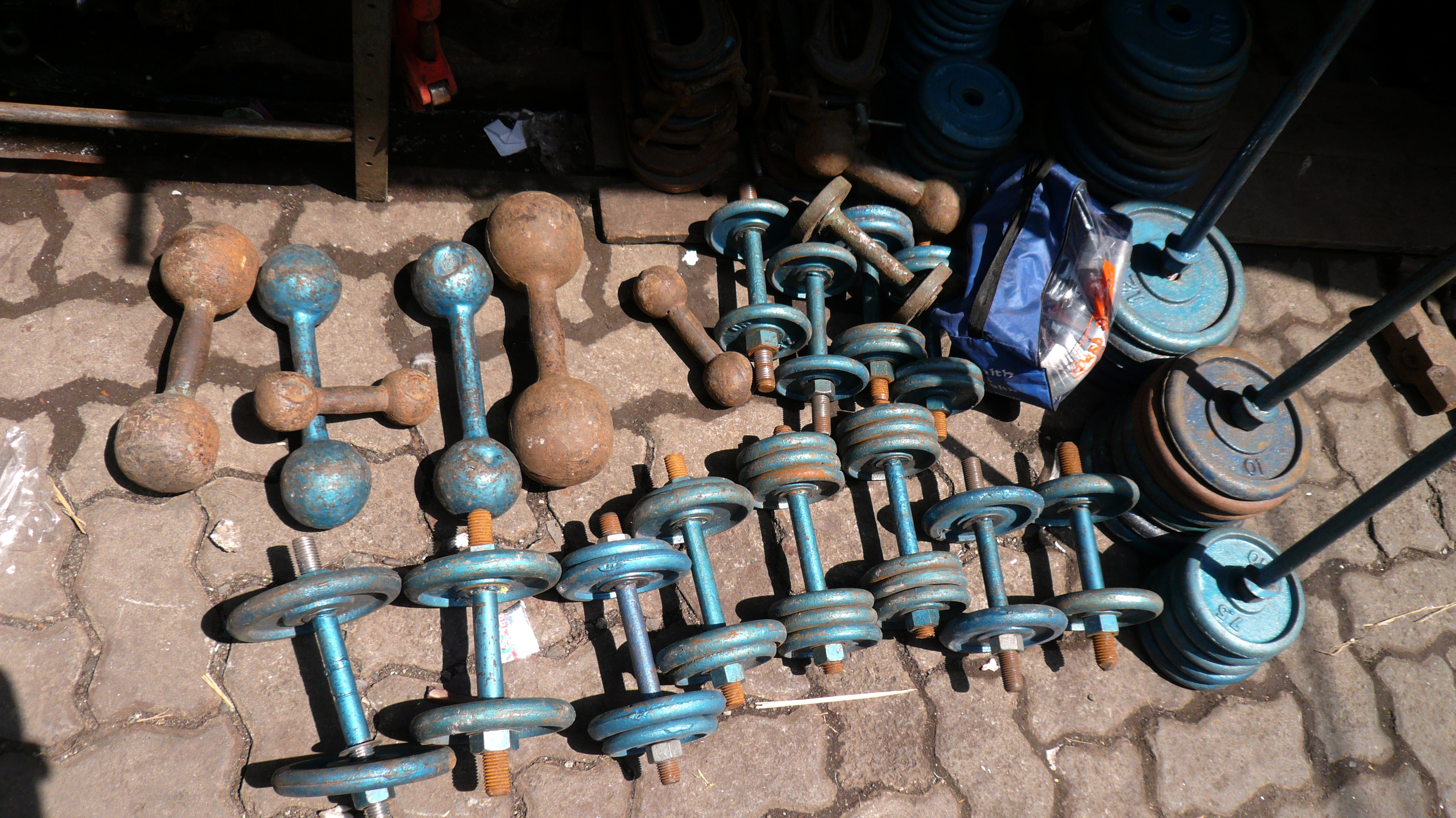
Dumbbells for sale at Chor Bazaar

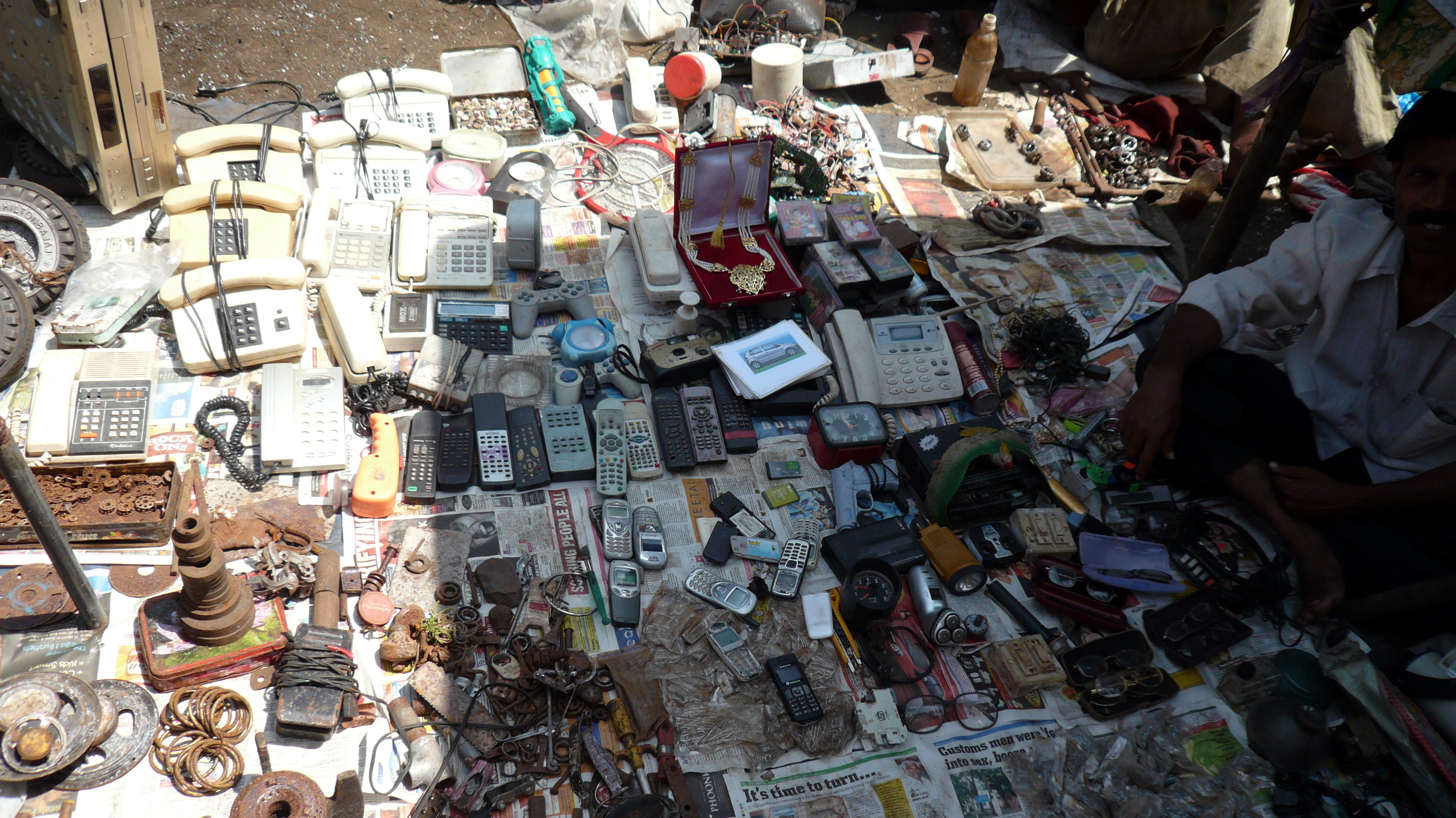
Old second hand phones and electronic goods for sale

== See also ==
- Arabber
- Bara Bazar (Vidhan Sabha constituency)
- Bazaar
- Bazaari
- Hawker centre (Asia) a centre where street food is sold
- Haat bazaar
- Peddler
- Retail
- Street vendor
- Street food
