= Saifee Burhani Upliftment Trust =

Indian urban development trust

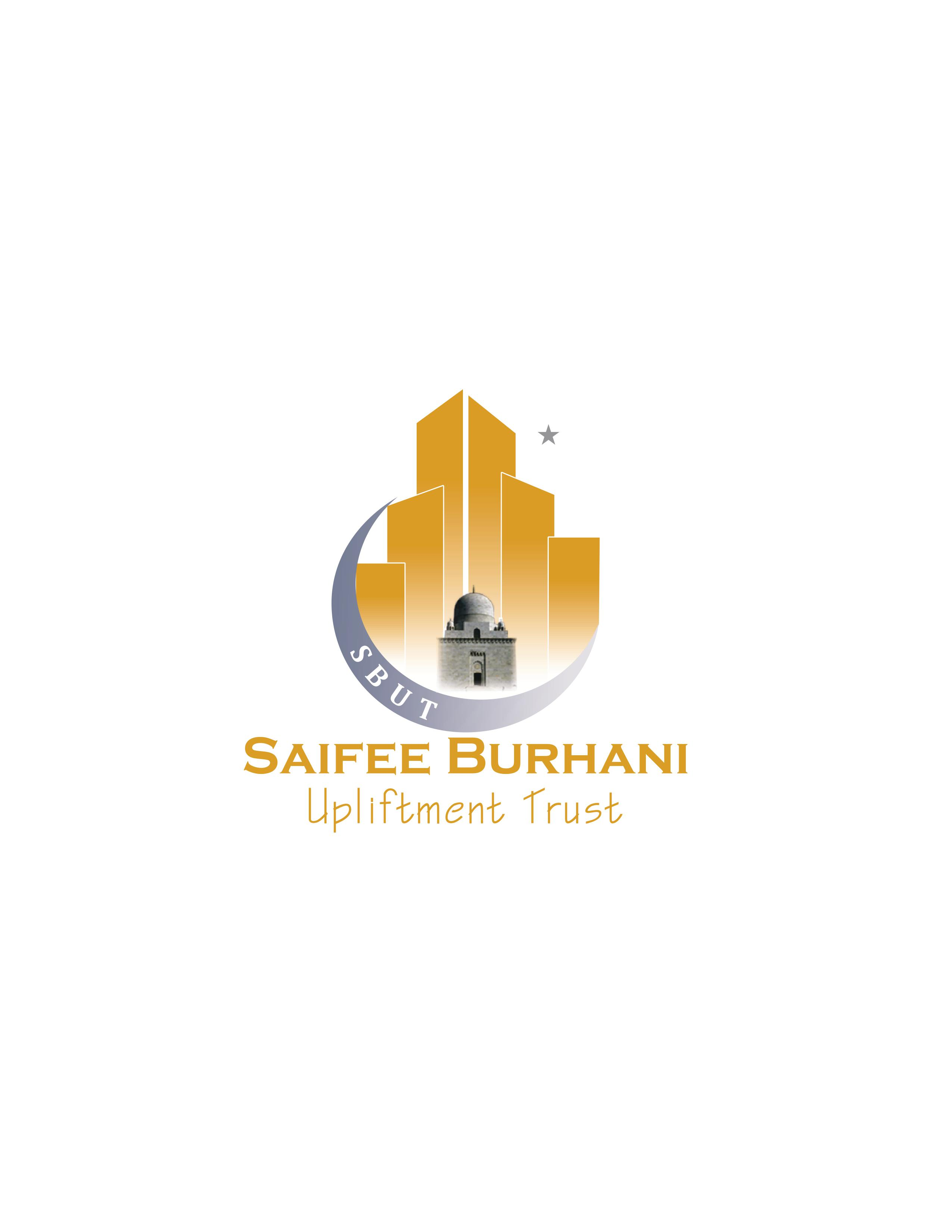
- Formation: January 23, 2009; 17 years ago
- Founded: 2009
- Founder: Mohammed Burhanuddin
- Type: Non-profit
- Purpose: 20,000 people from 3,200 families to be uplifted. 250 dilapidated buildings to be transformed to 11 towers
- Region served: Bhendi Bazaar, South Mumbai, Maharashtra, India
- Chairman: Husain Burhanuddin
- Awards: Green building in India, IGBC certificate; Smart Cities Mission award; FICCI 5th Smart Urban Innovation Awards
- Website: sbut.com

Saifee Burhani Upliftment Trust (SBUT) is a non-profit organization established in 2009 to undertake one of urban India's largest makeover projects of sheer magnitude and impacting around 20,000 people.

The redevelopment project was, envisioned by 52nd Da'i al-Mutlaq of Dawoodi Bohras community, Mohammed Burhanuddin. Today, the redevelopment of Bhendi Bazaar continues under the guidance of 53rd Da'i al-Mutlaq.

The project spans over an area of 16.5 acres comprising decrepit buildings, 3,200 families, and 1,250 shops. It is transforming into a modern and elaborate sustainable development embodying 11 new towers, wider roads, modern infrastructure, open spaces, commercial areas, among others. Of the total 3,200 families covered in the project, nearly all families have vacated their premises to facilitate the ambitious construction work.

In 2019, the first phase of the project was completed with the construction of the high-rise Al Sa’adah Towers.

As of February 2021, after completing the Phase 1 work of the Bhendi Bazar redevelopment project, the SBUT has initiated the Phase 2 construction work.

Syedna Mufaddal Saifuddin inaugurated the newly reconstructed Saifee Masjid and its complex on the eve of the Mawlid in September 2023. This complex known as Sector 1 was demolished and redeveloped with modern sustainable amenities and a commercial shopping arcade.

== Project Features ==
Bhendi Bazaar Makeover

Currently, most of Bhendi Bazaar’s residents are tenants who occupied less than 300 sq. ft. rooms in old, dilapidated buildings with common toilets. Regardless of the area they occupy, each legitimate tenant will get ownership of a minimum 350-sq-ft flat with its own kitchen and bathroom.

Environmentally Sustainable Practices

The old structures suffered from a number of infrastructural issues including outdated sanitation, lack of fire & safety measures and crammed spaces. Once completed, each sector will be a model for sustainability, a key element that was central to the redevelopment planning process. Each sector is planned to promote a sustainable way of living and includes practices like sewage treatment plant, Central Garbage Disposal System (CGDS), rain-water harvesting, green cover and solar lighting within the towers and public areas, among others.

Wider Roads and Parking Facilities

The narrow alleys will give way to 60-foot-wide roads. The planners have taken into account parking requirements, which have been incorporated into the building design to create free spaces, ease traffic and provide convenience to residents.

Supporting Commercial Success

A key aspect of the redevelopment project is to boost employment opportunities and wider socio-economic benefits for the people in the area and beyond. Post completion of the first phase, Al Sa'adah, all 128 commercial owners have returned to the new premises and have set up their shops.

== History ==
Bhendi Bazaar is situated near Crawford Market in South Mumbai. It was developed to house male migrant workers who thronged to Mumbai amidst the rising commercial activities due to the mushrooming mills in the Bombay Presidency. Over the years, several families sheltered themselves in the box-sized dormitories with space as little as 200 square feet and accompanied by unfathomable living conditions.

The redevelopment project of Bhendi Bazaar concurred with the Government of Maharashtra's amending of the cluster redevelopment policy in 2009. The project was conceptualized then, as an effort to uplift the lives of the people of Bhendi Bazaar and replace the dilapidated buildings with modern and safe infrastructure.

=== Timeline ===
Year	Milestone
2010	The project obtained 70% owner consent and applied to Letter of the undertaking.
2011	Chief Minister of Maharashtra Prithviraj Chavan nodded to the Bhendi Bazaar Redevelopment Project and Moved the first batch of tenants to the residential transit at Anjirwadi.
2013	The Trust inaugurated the commercial transit, Muffadal Shopping Arcade. After Syedna Mohammed Burhanuddin's demise in January 2014, post which the project is being taken care by his son and successor, Syedna Mufaddal Saifuddin. Vacating people and convincing them to shift to the residential transit homes or retail spaces while their new premises gets ready was a massive challenge.
2015	Project gets named as the first Smart-City Prototype and receives BMC appreciation. The organisation also got IOD Approval and a commencement certificate. It was acknowledged by Prime Minister Narendra Modi at an event at Vigyaan Bhavan in New Delhi.
2016	The Construction begins in sub-cluster 1 and sub-cluster 3 of the Bhendi Bazaar Project. The Trust had acquired 215 of the 250 buildings. Of these, 70 have been demolished with 1,700 families rehabilitated in purpose-built temporary accommodation being provided for free until the completion of their new homes.
2017	Project receives environment clearance from MoEF. A five-storey residential building which was part of the project collapsed on a Thursday morning after torrential rains, in which several died and many were injured. A blame game occurred between the MHADA and BMC while SBUT also were partly blamed by the opposition then.
2019	The trust completed two towers named ‘Al Sa’adah where 610 families and 128 businesses rehabilitated and received IOD approval in 2021 for further construction work.
2021	BMC agreed on a deal of exchanging 24 plots of BMC placed within the redevelopment area with SBUT in return for two plots owned by SBUT. On 24 October 2021, Syedna Mufaddal Saifuddin laid the foundation stone for the next phase of the project.
2022	In February 2022, the project received a commencement certificate (CC) to start construction work in Sector 4. This sector comprises around 1393 residential units and 321 commercial shops in two new towers of 51 and 52 storeys each. In August 2022, SBUT was issued a stop work notice by the BMC following directions of the Deputy Chief Minister of Maharashtra, Devendra Fadnavis. He told in the state assembly that alleged irregularities will be investigated in the project. In November 2022, the stop work notice was revoked, allowing construction to resume after there were no irregulaties found.
2023	On 7 February 2023, Deputy Chief Minister of Maharashtra, Devendra Fadnavis and Syedna Mufaddal Saifuddin laid the foundation stone for the upcoming Sector 4 named 'An-Nasr'. In his address, Fadnavis praised the Bhendi Bazaar redevelopment project and assured full support towards the timely completion of the project. On 25 September 2023, Saifee Masjid and Sector 1 of the project was inaugurated by Syedna Mufaddal Saifuddin. On 13 November 2023, Sector 6 named Al Ezz Tower's commercial arcade floors was granted part Occupancy Certificate(OC) by the authorities through which commercial shops will be shifted back into their new premises.
2024	On 6 June 2024, SBUT jointly won an award at FICCI’s 5th Smart Urban Innovation Awards in the 'Smart Infrastructure' category with the Ayodhya Development Authority.

== Temporary Accommodation ==
While revamping the Bhendi Bazaar, the trust has taken various initiatives and created residential and commercial transit so that the people get a good quality living environment in their new homes. The interests of the businesses of sub-cluster 1 and 3 were also taken into consideration, as over 299 commercial residents were affected when construction began in the first phase of the redevelopment. The commercial transit is located 0.5 km away from the project area in the busy street of Noor Baug. When construction work was initiated, some of the residents were accommodated in transit facilities at Anjeer wadi in Mazgaon, Ghodapdeo and Chunabhatti.

On 10 October 2013, the Saifee Burhani Upliftment Trust inaugurated a temporary commercial transit which would be displaced because of the construction activity in phase 1 of the cluster redevelopment project. The clusters 1 and cluster 3 that would undergo construction, are close to the mausoleum, Raudat Tahera, together housing over 299 shops.

A key issue raised by several shop owners during the transition period was the loss of footfalls and business during the transition period. To safeguard the interest of businesses that have been in Bhendi Bazaar for decades, the Trust built a temporary on-site commercial transit facility right in the heart of the project. The idea was to minimize displacement and curtail inconveniences to the area's shop owners while helping the businesses adapt to the street shopping environment that has been propose.

== Saifee Masjid Complex ==
Ghurrat ul Masajid, also known as Saifee Masjid, is a Dawoodi Bohra mosque in South Mumbai, Bhendi Bazaar. It was constructed in the early 20th century by Syedna Taher Saifuddin.

== Al Sa'adah Towers ==
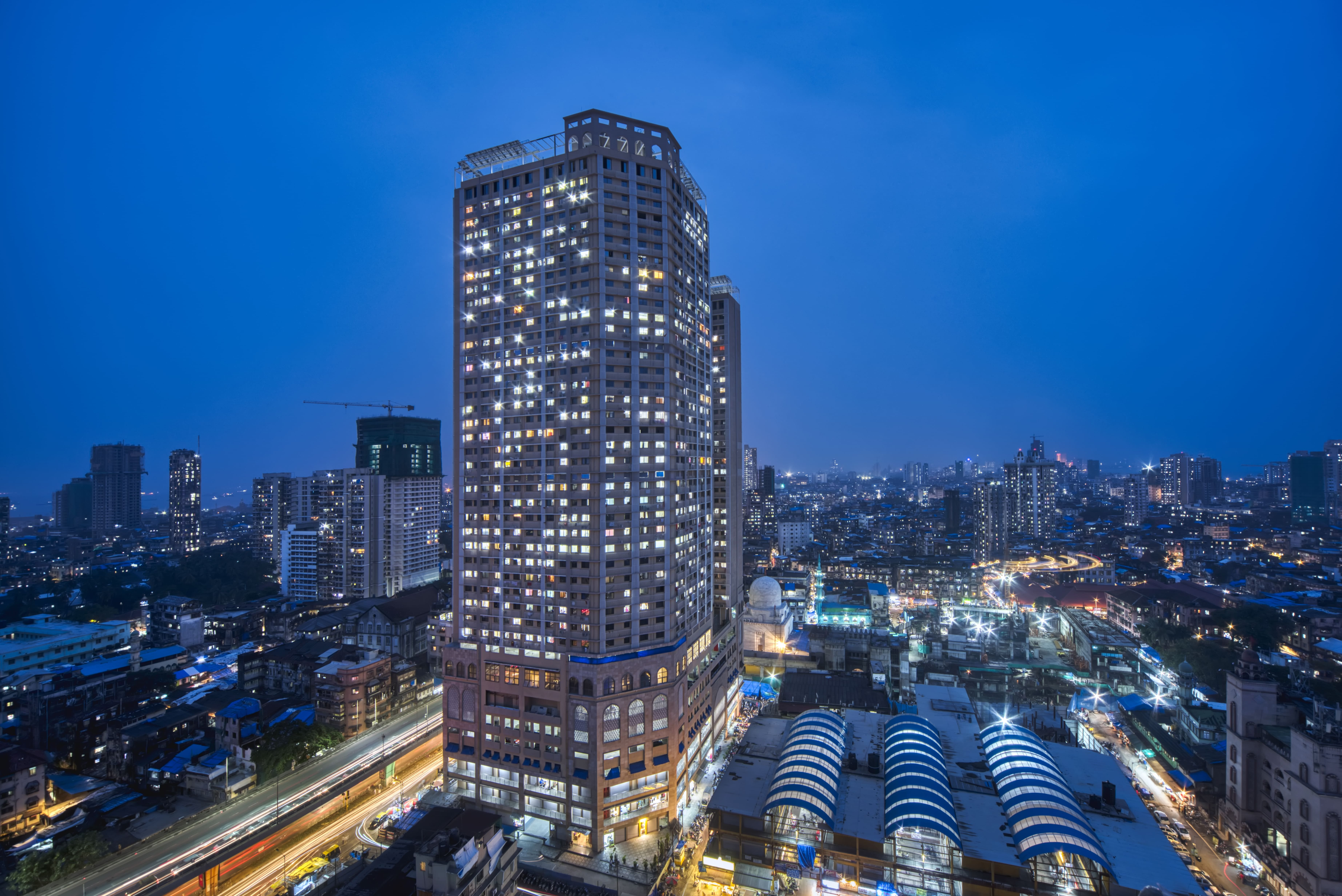
Al Saadah Towers

Al-Sa'adah Towers are the first two rehab high-rise towers of the Saifee Burhani Upliftment Project to be built. Al-Sa’adah, which symbolizes 'prosperity', is the first example of the Trust's promise to the people of Bhendi Bazaar. The construction of the towers began in 2016 and was completed in 45 months with one 36 storeys high and the other 41 storeys high.

All 610 families have been handed possession of their new flats and 128 business owners have set up their shop at the new premises. The rehabilitation of the families and businesses involved was taken care of by the Trust at no expense to any of the returnees.

== Gallery ==
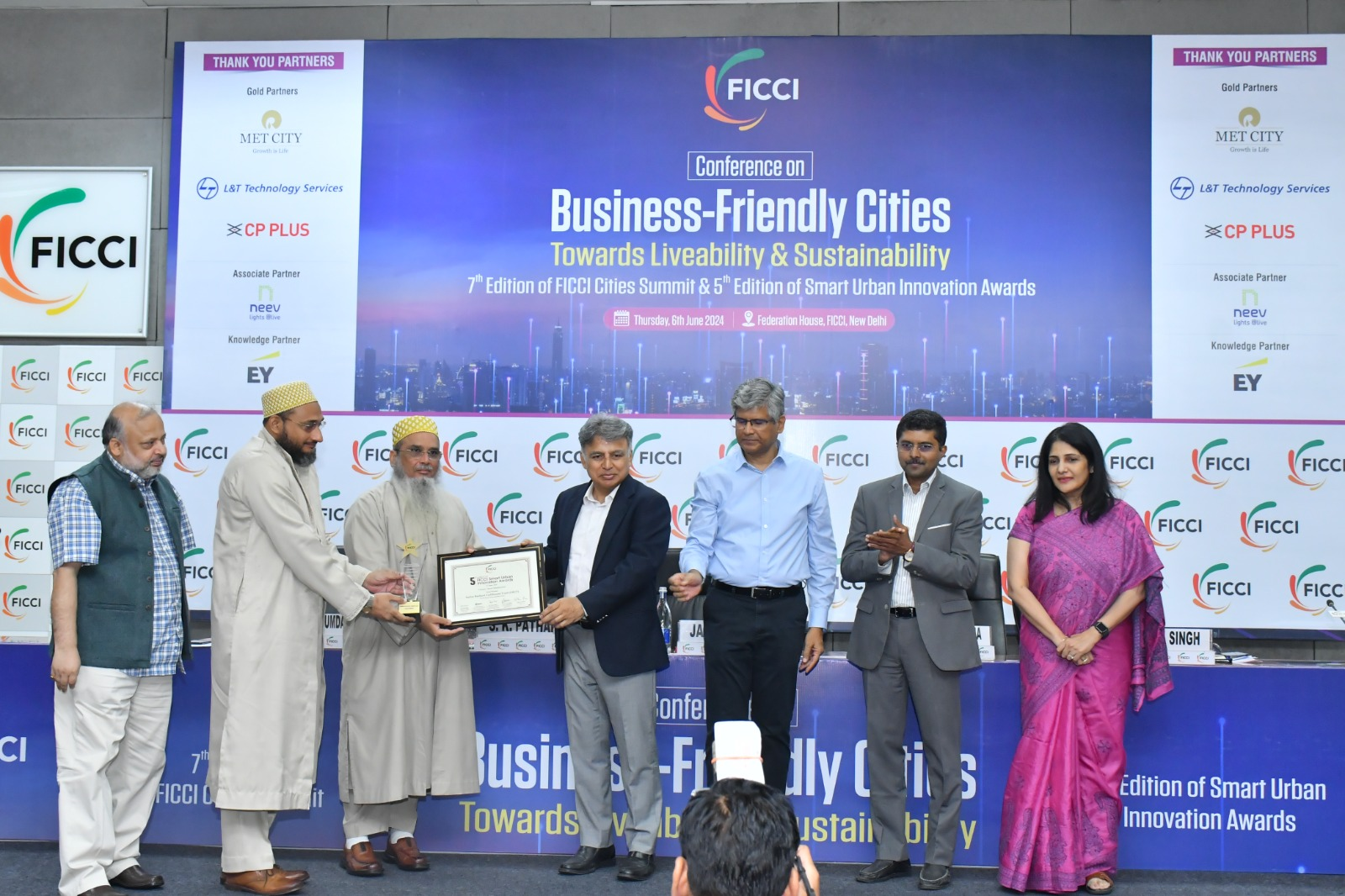
SBUT representatives receiving the 'Smart Infrastructure' award at FICCI's 5th Smart Urban Innovation Awards in New Delhi.

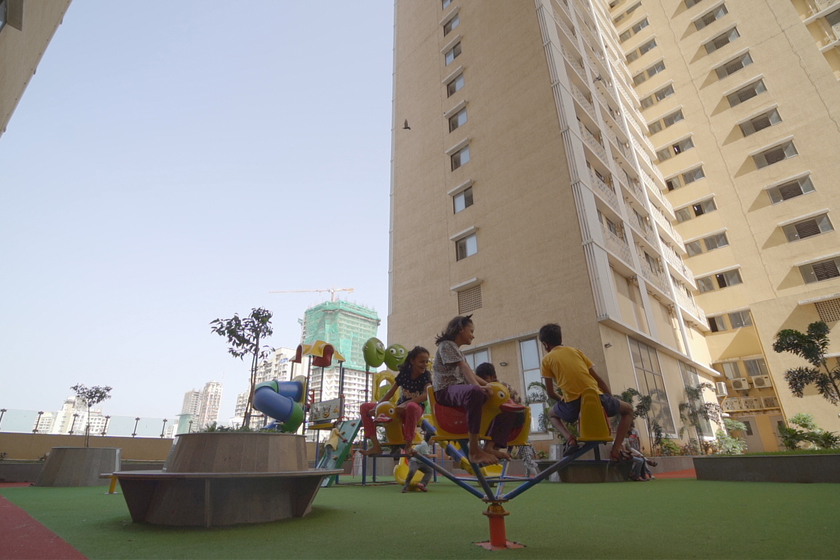
The new podium level of Al Sa'adah building.

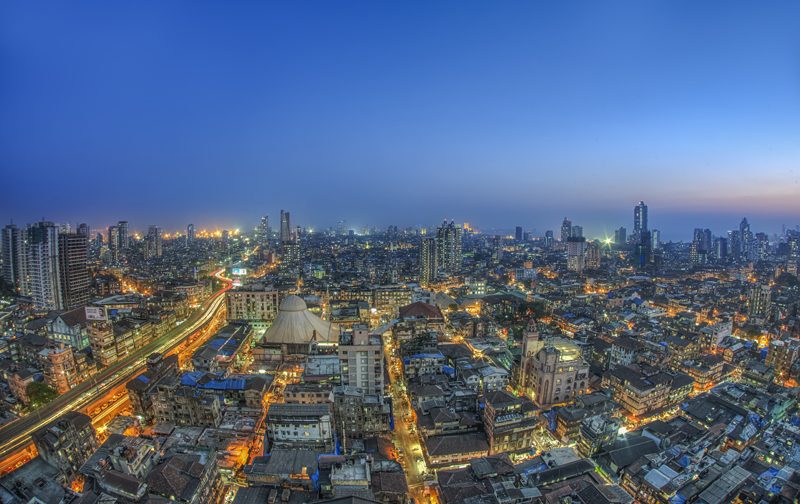
Aerial view of Bhendi Bazaar.

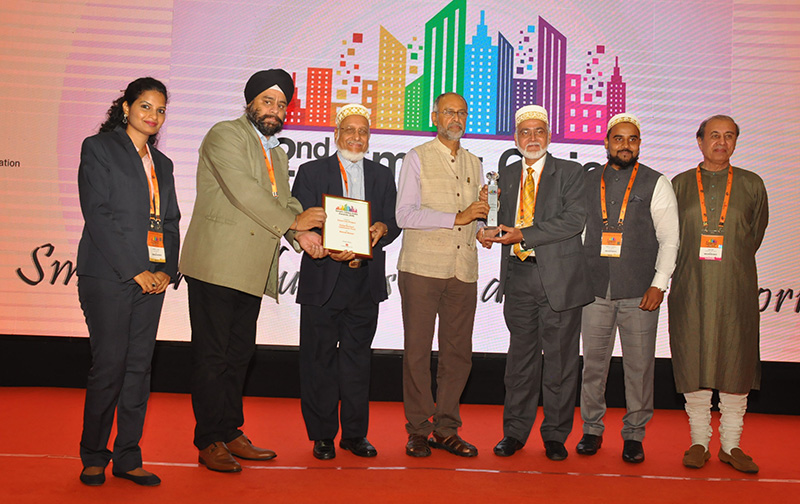
SBUT honoured with the prestigious 'Smart City Project' Award in 2016 at Vigyaan Bhavan in New Delhi.

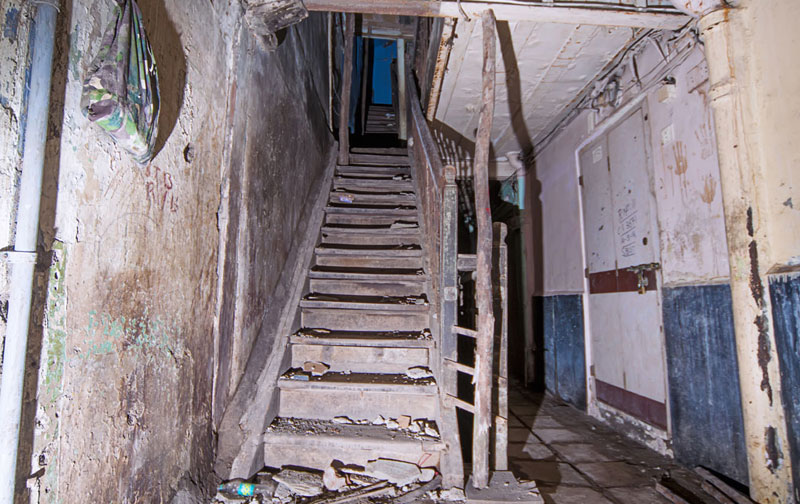
The old dilapidated structures of Bhendi Bazaar.
