= Taher Saifuddin =

Da'i al-Mutlaq of Dawoodi Bohra from 1915 to 1965

Syedna Syedna Taher Saifuddin 51st Da'i al-Mutlaq of the Dawoodi Bohra
- سيدنا طَاهر سيف الدِّين
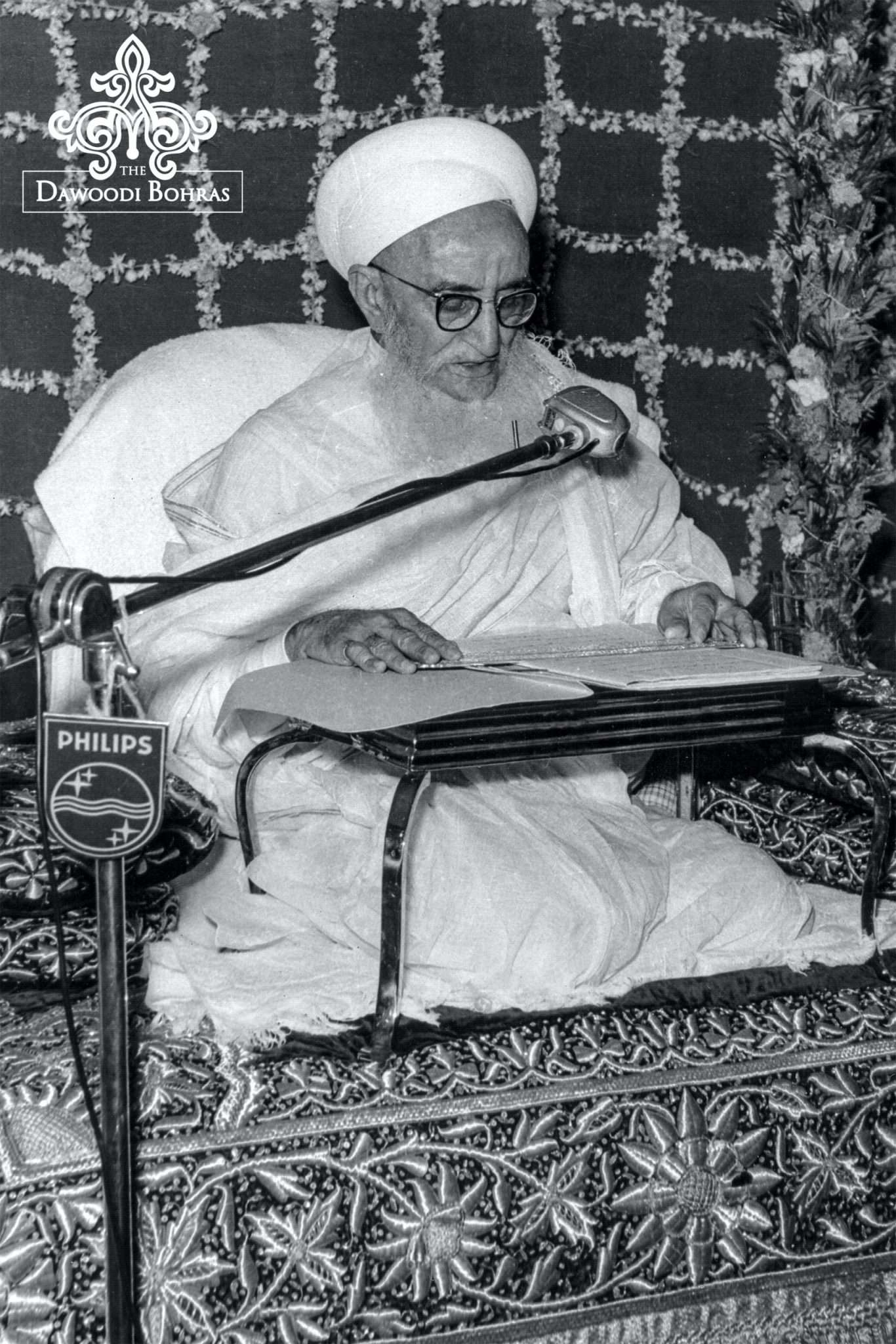

Da'i al-Mutlaq
- In office 1915–1965
- Preceded by: Abdullah Badruddin
- Succeeded by: Mohammed Burhanuddin
- Title: Syedna; Maulana; Shams al-Dua't al-Mutlaqeen

Personal life
- Born: Taher; 4 August 1888 Surat, British Raj
- Died: 12 November 1965 (aged 77) Matheran, India
- Resting place: Raudat Tahera, Mumbai
- Home town: Mumbai
- Spouse: Husaina
- Parents: Mohammad Burhanuddin I (father); Amatullah (mother)
- Citizenship: Indian

Religious life
- Religion: Islam (Shia Islam)
- Sect: Isma'ili; Dawoodi Bohra
- Jurisprudence: Mustaali; Tayyabi
- Style: His Holiness

Chancellor, Aligarh Muslim University
- In office 1953–1965
- Preceded by: Nawab Raza Ali Khan of Rampur
- Succeeded by: Nawab Muhammad Ahmad Said Khan

Syedna Taher Saifuddin (4 August 1888 (Note: Two published sources put the date of birth at 5 August 1888, whilst an entry in a book published by an official Dawoodi Bohra publication puts it at 4 August 1888.) – 12 November 1965), also known as Taher Saifuddin, was the 51st and longest serving Da'i al-Mutlaq of the Dawoodi Bohras. Saifuddin adapted the modernisation in Western and European ideas, and established its benefits for the Bohras, whilst still steeped in the traditions and the culture of the community's Fatimid heritage. Saifuddin laid substantial groundwork in terms of philanthropy, education, entrepreneurship, social outreach, political outreach, and community upliftment upon which his successors continued to build, resulting in an unprecedented era of prosperity among the Dawoodi Bohras.

== Early life ==
Taher Saifuddin was born to Mohammed Burhanuddin I and Amatullah Aaisaheba on 4 August 1888 in Surat, British India (present day the state of Gujarat).

== Da'i al-Mutlaq ==
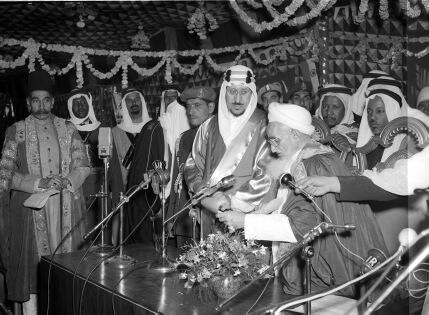
Saifuddin confers honorary doctorate to King Saud in 1955 at Aligarh.

Saifuddin became the 51st al-Dāʿī al-Mutlaq in the year 1915 at the age of 28.

During his reign, he rebuilt and repaired many monuments of the Fatimid Imams, al-Dāʿī al-Mutlaq, and other structures, and artifacts.

=== Education ===
Saifuddin was instrumental in setting up over 350 co-ed institutes, some of which bear his name, including but not limited to: Aljamea-tus-Saifiyah in Surat, Saifee Hall in Calcutta, Saifiyah Girls School in Karachi, Saifi High in Mumbai, Saifee Nursery at Saifee Mahal in Mumbai, Saifee Eide Zahabi College in Karachi, Saifee Golden Jubilee Quaderia College in Burhanpur, Saifee Jubilee Arts and Commerce College in Sidhpur. Mohammed Burhanuddin later organized the schools under the banner of MSB Educational Institute (also known as Al Madrasa Tus Saifiya Tul Burhaniyah), which are affiliated with Indian Certificate of Secondary Education and, as of 2011, has branches in 22 cities across India, Pakistan, East Africa, and the Middle East. Burhanuddin organized the numerous religious schools world-wide known as Madrasas under the purview of the department of Attalim.

Saifuddin was appointed the Chancellor of Aligarh Muslim University for four consecutive terms, starting in 1953. Under Saifuddin's chancellorship, Jawaharlal Nehru, first Prime Minister of India, laid the foundation of Asia's largest library, the Maulana Azad Library, at AMU.

==== Aljamea-tus-Saifiyah ====
His Holiness [Taher Saifuddin] is not only the heir to Fatimid tradition of learning, but has in the course of his fifty years of office wrestled with the problems of the modern age. Literature and poetry, learning and teaching, organisation and administration, national and international harmony, commerce, industry and technology, these are the broad facets which received his diligent attention and filled every moment of his life.

— Yusuf Najmuddin, in a foreword of his book 'A Philosophical Discourse' speaks of Saifuddin's stewardship of the Dawoodi Bohra community.

Saifuddin from his own personal wealth renovated Dars-e Saifee, an institution of Islamic studies, founded by his predecessor Abdeali Saifuddin c. 1810 in Surat, transformed it in to a university by introducing secular courses and establishing affiliations with international educational bodies, and consequently renamed it Aljamea-tus-Saifiyah (lit. 'The Saifiyah University').

Keeping in line with tradition of his predecessor, Ismail Badr al-Din I, the talabat al-ilm (lit. 'seekers of knowledge') of the institution were provided with lodging and meals at full cost to the office of Dai al-Mutlaq. To further inclusion and expansion, Saifuddin admitted to Aljamea its first female students. As is tradition, in his capacity as Dai al-Mutlaq, Saifuddin personally taught select classes at the newly renovated Academy. Saifuddin brought about a structural and functional change at Aljamea: He personally oversaw the standardization of the syllabus of each class and wrote numerous memoranda and treatises which were instilled into the curriculum. To this day, the treatises written by Saifuddin and his successors, Mohammed Burhanuddin and Mufaddal Saifuddin, are taught through the year and are central subjects of al-Imtihan al-Sanawi (lit. 'the annual exams'), among other religious and secular subjects.

After succeeding his father, Burhanuddin significantly expanded the reach of Aljamea: He added Mahad al-Zahra, an institute of Quranic studies c. 1976, re-renovated the Surat campus c. 1983, established campuses at Karachi c. 1983, Nairobi c. 2011, and Mumbai c. 2013. Aljamea and its graduates have since become integral to spiritual and temporal aspects of the Dawoodi Bohra community.

=== Community service ===
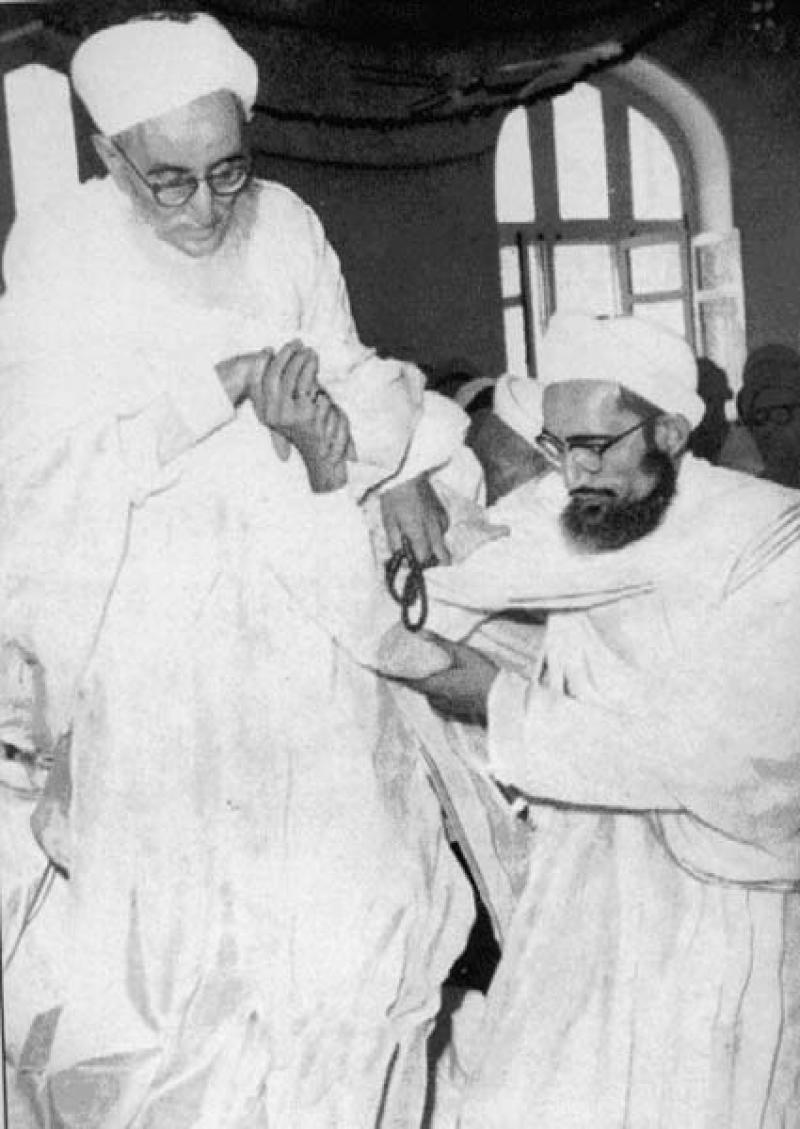
Saifuddin with his son and successor Mohammed Burhanuddin c. 1960.

Syedna Saifuddin founded Bunaiyat-tul-Eidiz-Zahabi, a volunteer-run organisation of Dawoodi Bohra Women, in the 1950s which set a precedent that led to formation of Burhani Women's Association by his son Burhanuddin; Happy Threads and Supermums by Mufaddal Saifuddin's daughter Umme Haani in 2010s, and The Radiant Arts by Mufaddal Saifuddin's daughter-in-law Zaenab Imaduddin.

In a similar vein, Saifuddin established an organisation of Dawoodi Bohra men, Shabab ul-Eid iz-Zahabi, during the Golden Jubilee celebrations of his 50 years in the office of Dai al-Mutlaq, exclusively for community service. Mohammed Burhanuddin would later found the Burhani Guards (for crowd-control at miqaats lit. 'religious events'), Tolaba ul-Kulliyat il-Mumenoon (of college and school students), Burhani Medical Idara (of medical professionals), Saifee Ambulance in India, and Burhani Ambulance in Pakistan (of paramedics and first responders). Mufaddal Saifuddin, on his first visit to North America, established Saifee Burhani Medical Association (America), on 14 March 2015.

=== Rasm-e Saifee ===
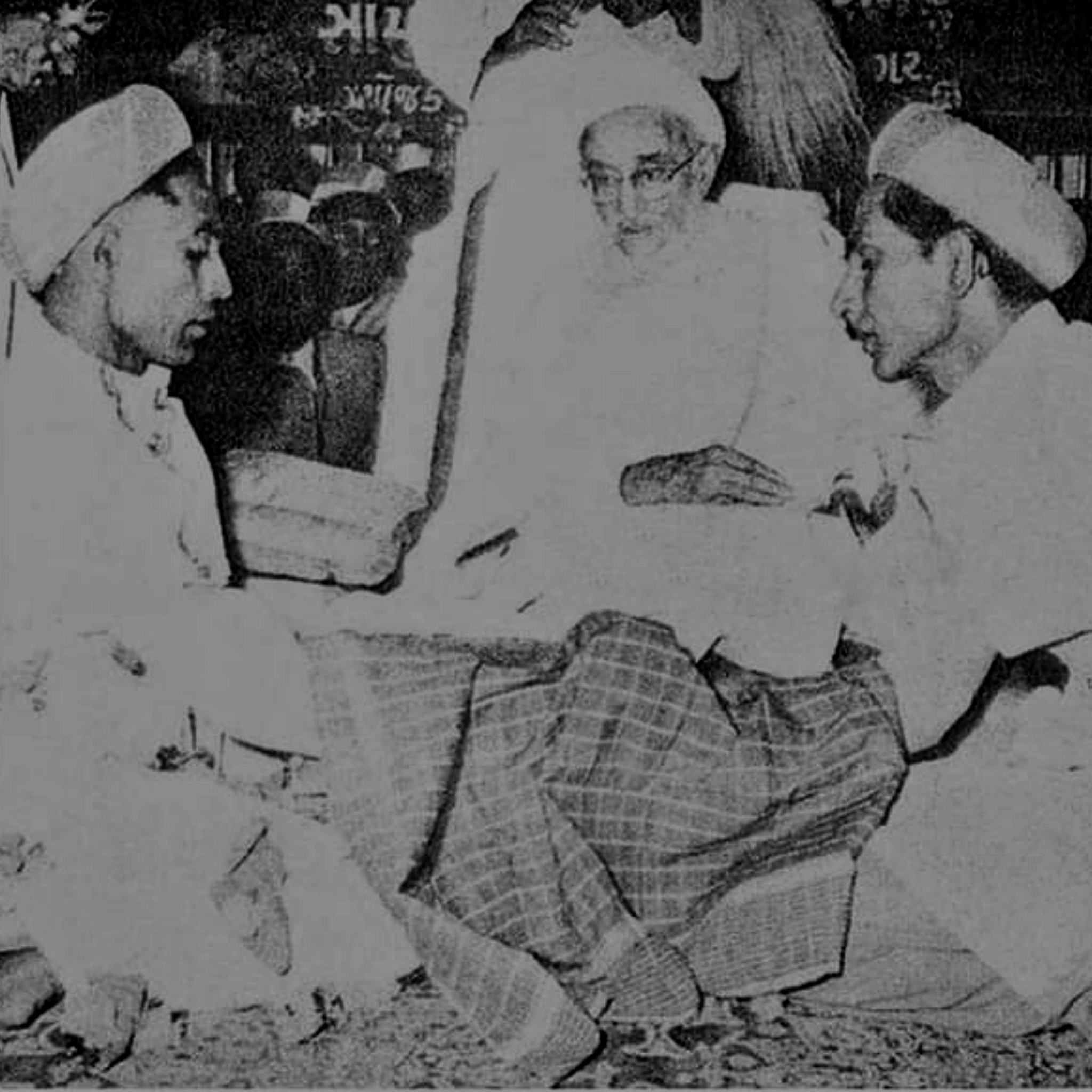
Saifuddin presides over a Rasm-e Saifee Nikah in Jamnagar.

To subsidize costs and facilitate marriages among the close knit Dawoodi Bohra, Saifuddin initiated Rasm-e Saifee (lit. 'The tradition of Saifee') in Jamnagar c. 1952 and later institutionalised it c. 1963. Rasm-e Saifee is a singular occasion when multiple Nikah are solemnized at the hands of the Da'i al-Mutlaq and his representatives. Burhanuddin further organized it under International Taiyseer al-Nikah Committee (ITNC) (lit. 'International Committee for Marriage Facilitation'), which organizes Rasm-e Saifee throughout the year at various miqaats (lit. '(religious) gatherings'). Burhanuddin's successor, Mufaddal Saifuddin, continues to uphold the tradition.

=== Contributions to Islamic Institutions ===
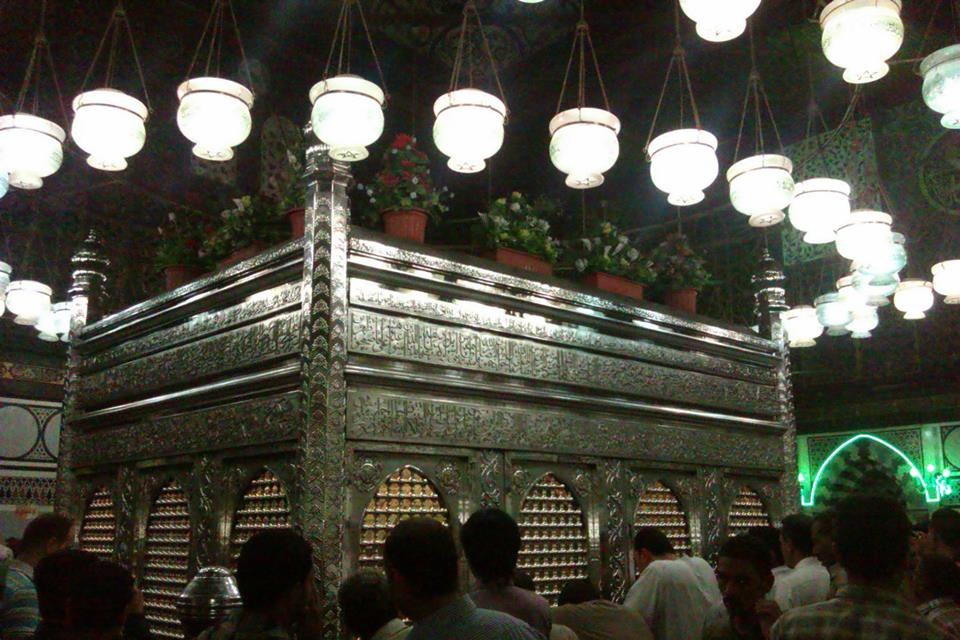
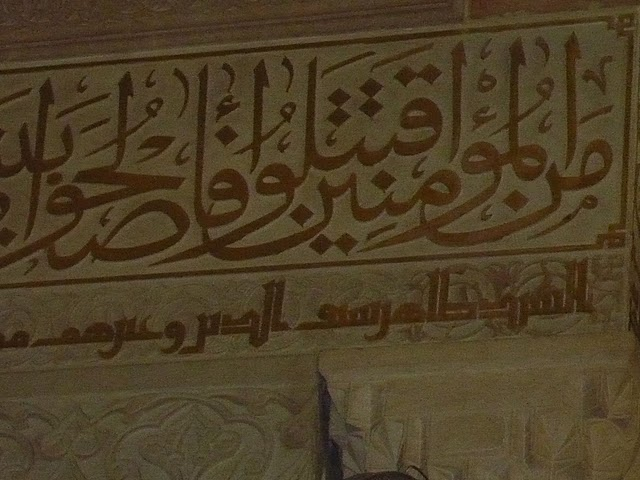
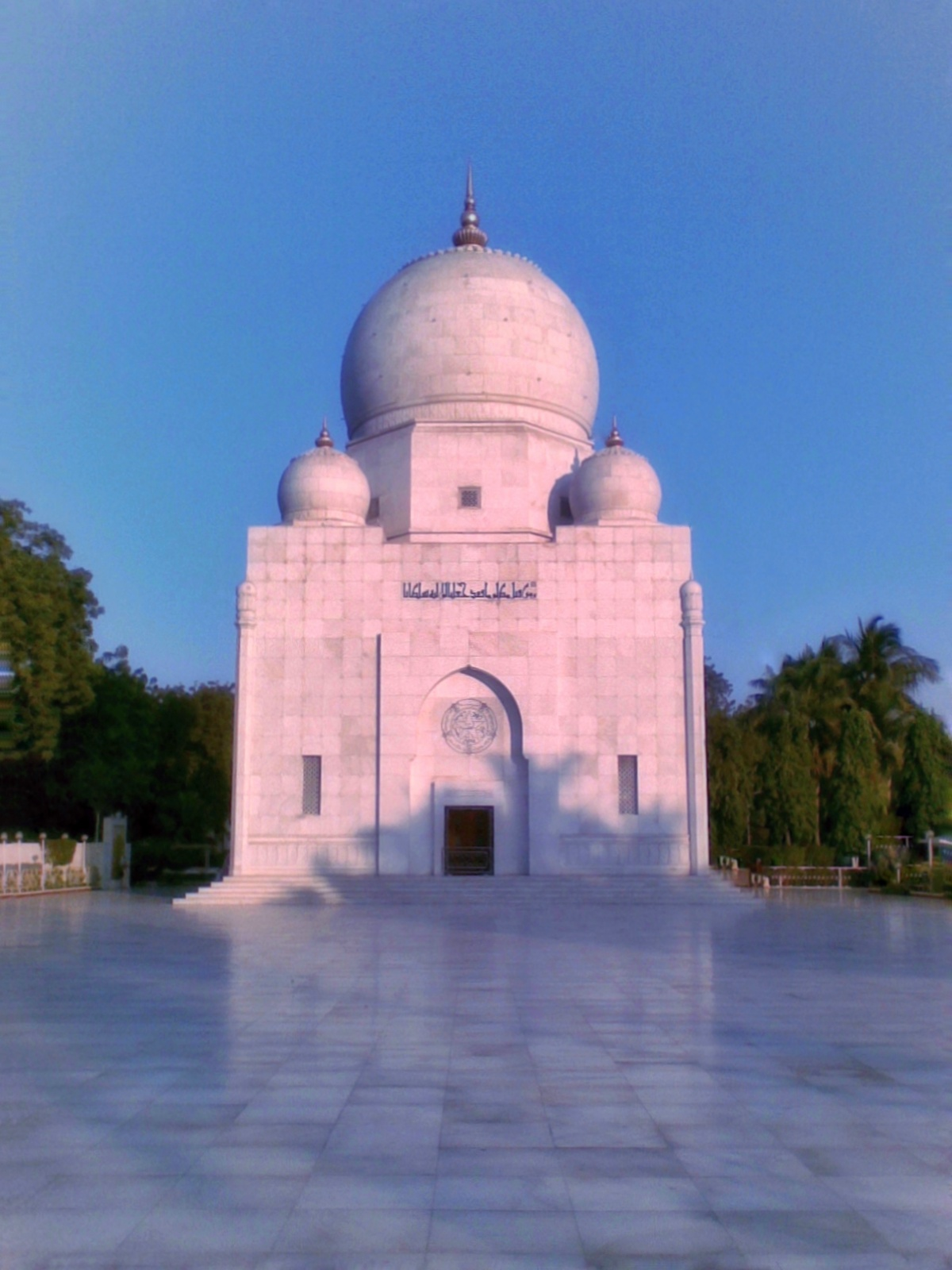
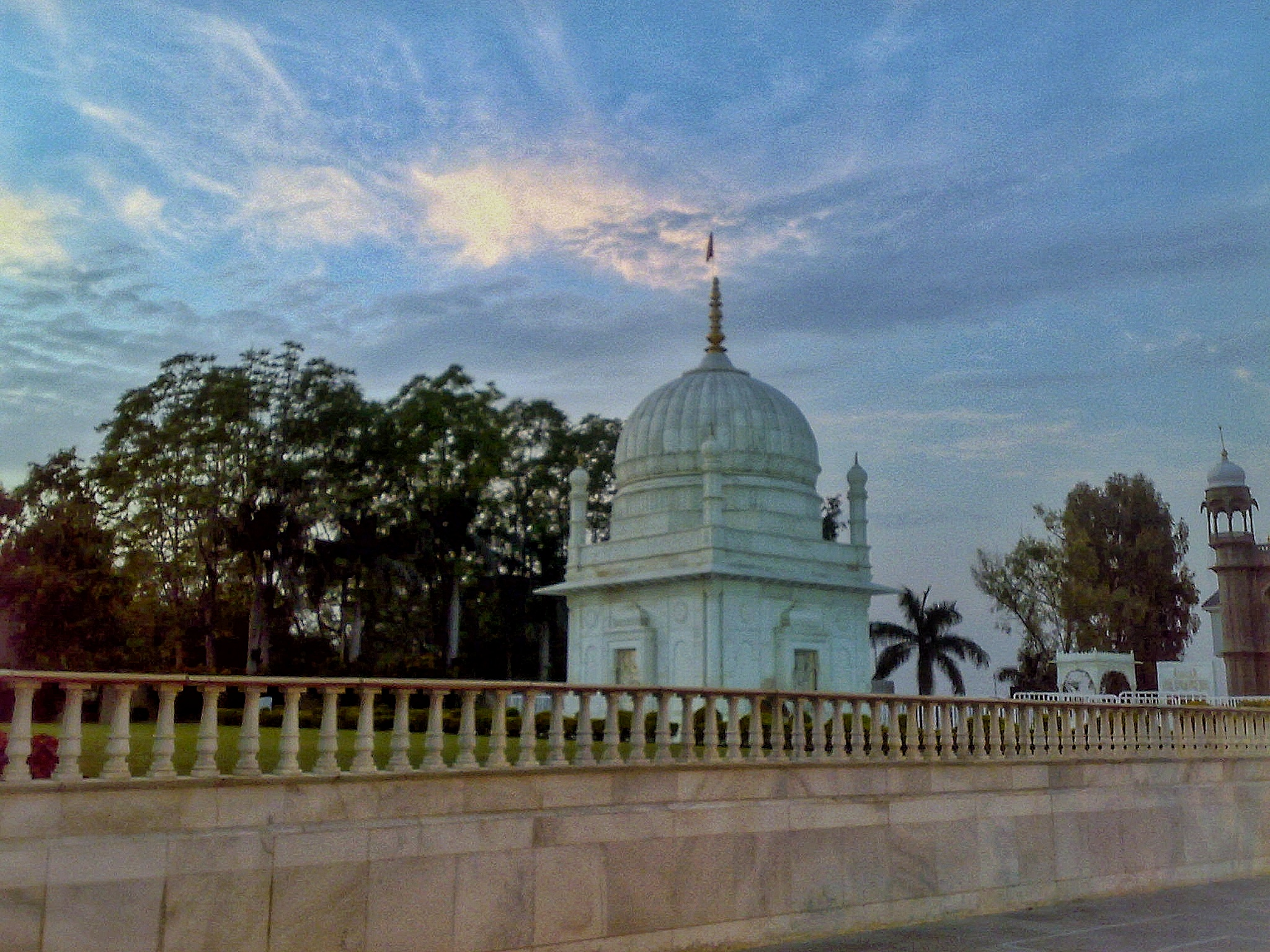
Top (from left): Ras al-Husayn zareeh (Cairo) built by Saifuddin c. 1965; Saifuddin's name inscribed at Al-Aqsa Mosque. Bottom: Mazar e Qutbi (Ahmedabad) and Mazar e Fakhri (Taherabad), both built by Saifuddin.

Saifuddin contributed vast sums of money towards the refurbishment of mosques and shrines. He along with the Nizam of Hyderabad were among the few Indian Muslims to contribute towards the renovation of Al Aqsa Mosque in Jerusalem:

Sultan Taher Saif al-Din is said to have come from India with one hundred and fifty of his followers...At the Jerusalem station he was welcomed by the Mufti and other Sheikhs of the Supreme Moslem Council and a number of Arab notables including Ragheb Bey Nashashibi. A troop of Arab boy scouts paraded in his honour and there were two bands from Moslem institutions...The sultan was reputed to be a man of great wealth who had made substantial contributions to the religious and political funds of the Arabs of this country.

Saifuddin also gifted the internal curtains which were kept in the Kaaba for decades to King Abdul Aziz of Saudi Arabia in 1354AH, with whom he kept warm relations.

Saifuddin constructed Ghurrat-ul Masajid (lit. 'Pride of Mosques'), also known as Saifee Masjid, in Mumbai, Al-Mahal al-Saifee (lit. 'Saifee Palace') for pilgrims in Mecca, the zarih of Ali Ibn Abi Talib in Najaf and Husayn ibn Ali in Karbala and Cairo, the mausoleum of Qutub Khan Qutub al-Din and Fakhr al-Din Shaheed. He also made and donated the kiswah for the Masjid al-Haram.

=== The Chandabhoy Galla Case ===
The Chandabhoy Galla Case set a significant precedent on the issue of a human's claim to being infallible, immaculate, executor of God's will, and trusteeship of God's funds. The case was filed in 1917, during the British rule of India, by Sir Thomas Strangman, the Advocate General of Bombay, at the behest of Adamjee Peerbhoy's family against the 51st Dai al-Mutlaq of the Dawoodi Bohra, Taher Saifuddin. In 1921, Saifuddin won the case on basis of the belief that Imam, as representative of the Prophet and through him the representative of God, having withdrawn from public life, must entrust someone to represent them the Dai al-Mutlaq (and hence Saifuddin), in accordance with Tayyibi religious belief. Upon conclusion of the case, Strangman noted:

"Looking back on the proceedings, I think what impressed me the most, even more than the extravagance of the claims, was the personality of the Mullaji, a frail looking figure possessed nevertheless of an iron will, great determination, and organising capacity. At the time he assumed office the administration must have been extremely slack. Yet he managed in a very few years not only to pull the administration together but to obtain a hold upon his followers greater perhaps than that of any of his predecessors."

=== Ashara Mubaraka ===
List of cities Saifuddin presided over for Ashara as Dai al-Mutlaq
CE	AH	City	Province	Country
1915	1334	Surat	Bombay Presidency	India (British Raj)
1916	1335	Surat	Bombay Presidency	India (British Raj)
1917	1336	Surat	Bombay Presidency	India (British Raj)
1918	1337	Surat	Bombay Presidency	India (British Raj)
1919	1338	Siddhpur	Baroda State	India (British Raj)
1920	1339	Mumbai	Bombay Presidency	India (British Raj)
1921	1340	Siddhpur	Baroda State	India (British Raj)
1922	1341	Mumbai	Bombay Presidency	India (British Raj)
1923	1342	Karachi	Sind Division, Bombay Presidency	India (British Raj)
1924	1343	Surat / Mumbai	Bombay Presidency	India (British Raj)
1925	1344	Mumbai / Kapadvanj	Bombay Presidency	India (British Raj)
1926	1345	Mumbai	Bombay Presidency	India (British Raj)
1927	1346	Surat	Bombay Presidency	India (British Raj)
1928	1347	Mumbai	Bombay Presidency	India (British Raj)
1929	1348	Karachi	Sind Division, Bombay Presidency	India (British Raj)
1930	1349	Mumbai	Bombay Presidency	India (British Raj)
1931	1350	Mumbai	Bombay Presidency	India (British Raj)
1932	1351	Mumbai	Bombay Presidency	India (British Raj)
1933	1352	Mumbai	Bombay Presidency	India (British Raj)
1934	1353	Karachi	Sind Division, Bombay Presidency	India (British Raj)
1935	1354	Surat	Bombay Presidency	India (British Raj)
1936	1355	Udaipur	Udaipur State, Rajputana Agency	India (British Raj)
1937	1356	Medina	Hejaz Province	Saudi Arabia
1938	1357	Kapadvanj	Bombay Presidency	India (British Raj)
1939	1358	Devlali	Bombay Presidency	India (British Raj)
1940	1359	Khambat (Cambay)	Bombay Presidency	India (British Raj)
1941	1360	Colombo	Western Province	Ceylon (British Ceylon)
1942	1361	Surat	Bombay Presidency	India (British Raj)
1943	1362	Dahod	Bombay Presidency	India (British Raj)
1943 / 1944	1363	Mumbai	Bombay Presidency	India (British Raj)
1944	1364	Jhalrapatan	Jhalawar State, Rajputana Agency	India (British Raj)
1945	1365	Siddhpur	Baroda State	India (British Raj)
1946	1366	Rampura	Indore State, Central India Agency	India (British Raj)
1947	1367	Mumbai	Bombay Province	India (Dominion of India)
1948	1368	Mumbai	Bombay Province	India (Dominion of India)
1949	1369	Surat	Bombay State	India (Dominion of India)
1950	1370	Mumbai	Bombay State	India
1951	1371	Mumbai	Bombay State	India
1952	1372	Karachi	Federal Capital Territory	Pakistan (Dominion of Pakistan)
1953	1373	Kolkata, (Calcutta)	West Bengal	India
1954	1374	Udaipur	Rajasthan	India
1955	1375	Karachi	Federal Capital Territory	Pakistan (Dominion of Pakistan)
1956	1376	Siddhpur	Bombay State	India
1957	1377	Mumbai	Bombay State	India
1958	1378	Mumbai	Bombay State	India
1959	1379	Karachi	Federal Capital Territory	Pakistan
1960	1380	Mumbai	Maharashtra	India
1961	1381	Mumbai	Maharashtra	India
1962	1382	Karachi	West Pakistan	Pakistan
1963	1383	Siddhpur	Gujarat	India
1964	1384	Mumbai	Mahrastra	India
1965	1385	Karachi	West Pakistan	Pakistan

== Family ==
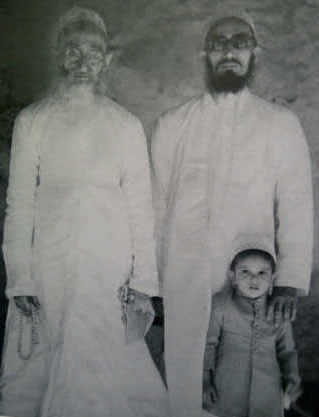
The 51st, 52nd, and 53rd Dai al-Mutlaq c. 1950.

Saifuddin married Husaina Aaisaheba, who was also from the family of the Du'at Mutlaqeen. After her death, he then married Vazira Aaisaheba, Fatima Aaisaheba, and Amina Aaisaheba.

Saifuddin had 12 sons and 8 daughters: His sons were Mohammed Burhanuddin, Husain Husamuddin, (Note: Mukasir al-Dawat to Mohammed Burhanuddin, Mazoon al-Dawat to Mufaddal Saifuddin.) Abdut Taiyeb Zakiyuddin, Yusuf Najmuddin, (Note: Amir al-Jamea (Rector of Aljamea-tus-Saifiyah).) Ismail Shehabuddin, Hatim Hamiduddin, Qasim Hakimuddin, (Note: Amir al-Jamea (Rector of Aljamea-tus-Saifiyah). Mukasir, and then Mazoon al-Dawat to Mufaddal Saifuddin.) Aliasgar Kalimuddin, (Note: Amir al-Jamea (Rector of Aljamea-tus-Saifiyah). Mukasir, and then Mazoon al-Dawat to Mufaddal Saifuddin.) Shabbir Nooruddin, (Note: Chairman, Islamic Foundation) Abbas Fakhruddin, (Note: Amir al-Jamea (Rector of Aljamea-tus-Saifiyah).) Mohammed al-Baqir Jamaluddin, and Khuzaima Qutbuddin. (Note: Mazoon al-Dawat to Mohammed Burhanuddin. Claimant to the post of the 53rd Dai al-Mutlaq.) His daughters were Asma, Maryam, Khadijah, Zahra, Shireen, Banu, Fatema, and Zainab.

Saifuddin descends from the family of the early leaders of the Fatimid mission in India, Fakhr al-Din and Abd al-Qadir Hakim al-Din.

== Works ==
=== Rasāʾil Ramaḍāniyya (Epistles) ===
Saifuddin's Risalah (lit. 'epistle') are peculiarly titled gematrically equivalent to the Hijri year of its publication.

A list of Rasāʾil Ramaḍāniyya composed by Taher Saifuddin.
ID	Title	Title (Romanticized)	Orig (AH)	Pub (AH)	Pub (CE)
AH 1330s
STS 01	ضوء نور الحق المبين	Ḍawʾ nūr al-ḥaqq al-mubīn	1335		
STS 02	ثمرات علوم الهدى	Ṯamarāt ʿulūm al-hudā	1337		
STS 03	زهر رياض الازلية	Zahr al-riyāḍ al-azaliyya	1338		
STS 04	درر البشارت	Durar al-bišārāt	1339		
AH 1340s
STS 05	المشرب الكوثري	Al-Mašrab al-kawṯarī	1340		
STS 06	درر الهدى المضيئة	Durar al-hudā al-muḍīʾa	1341		
STS 07	روض عالم القدس	Rawḍ ʿālam al-quds	1342		
STS 08	غرفة جنة	Ġurfat ǧanna	1343		
STS 09	غرة الحق	Ġurrat al-ḥaqq	1344		
STS 10	ثمار جنات عدن طيبة	Ṯimār ǧannāt ʿadnin ṭayyiba	1345		
STS 11	قطف شجرة خلدية	Qaṭf šaǧara ḫuldiyya	1346		
STS 12	زبدة برهان الصدق الواضح	Zubdat burhān al-ṣidq al-wāḍiḥ	1347		
STS 13	صبغ نور	Ṣibġ nūr	1348		
STS 14	غرس الجنة	Ġars al-ǧanna	1349		
AH 1350s
STS 15	درر اسرار اْل الكرار	Durar asrār āl al-Karrār	1350		
STS 16	نور روض الجنة	Nūr rawḍ al-ǧanna	1351		
STS 17	بحر فضل كبير	Baḥr faḍl kabīr	1352		
STS 18	مسرات الفتح المبين	Masarrat al-fatḥ al-mubīn	1353		
STS 19	الباب حظيرة القدس	Al-Bāb ḥaẓīrat al-quds	1354		
STS 20	كرامة العقول الوضية	Karāmat al-ʿuqūl al-waḍiyya	1355		
STS 21	صفحات عرفات المعارف	Ṣafḥat ʿarafāt al-maʿārif	1356		
STS 22	انهار رياض الجنة	Anhār riyāḍ al-ǧanna	1357		
STS 23	سحب بركات الخلد	Suḥub barakāt al-ḫuld	1358		
STS 24	ذات البركة	Ḏāt al-baraka	1359		
AH 1360s
STS 25	كوثر الخلد	Kawṯar ḫuld	1360		
STS 26	روضة فردوس	Rawḍat firdaws	1361		
STS 27	دلو غدير حق	Dalw Ġadīr ḥaqq	1362		
STS 28	مشربة تسنيم نور	Mašrabat tasnīm nūr	1363		
STS 29	سلسبيل حكم غدق	Salsabīl ḥikam ġadaq	1364		
STS 30	سرر رشد مرفوعة	Surar rušd Marfūʿa	1365		
STS 31	صور حوض مورود	Ṣuwar ḥawḍ mawrūd	1366		
STS 32	تكبير سكينة فتح مبين	Takbīr sakīnat fatḥ mubīn	1367		
STS 33	فلسفة فوز عظيم	Falsafat fawz ʿaẓīm	1368		
STS 34	تذكرة لبيب	Taḏkirat labīb	1369		
AH 1370s
STS 35	سلسلة نعمة عظمى		1370		
STS 36	نعم الصبغة الالهية		1371		
STS 37	خزائن امام المتقين		1372		
STS 38	مفاتيح ياقوتة الحمراء		1373		
STS 39	نهر النور الشعشعاني		1374		
STS 40	بلاغ الدعاة الفاطميين		1375		
STS 41	اشعة الفيض الازلي		1376		
STS 42	امثال سدرة المنتهى	Amṯāl sidrat al-muntahā	1377		1958
STS 43	روضة دار السلام	Rawḍat dār al-Salām	1378	1430	2009
STS 44	توحيد الملة البيضاء	Tawḥīd al-Millah al-Bayḍāʾ	1379	1431	2010
AH 1380s
STS 45	بركات اصحاب التطهير	Barakāt Aṣḥāb al-Taṭhīr	1380	1432	2011
STS 46	كمال النعم السابغة	Kamāl al-Aiʿam al-Sābiġa	1381	1433	2012
STS 47	تسبيح ذهب القدس	Tasbīḥ ḏahab al-Quds	1382	1434	2013
STS 48	شموس بركات الربانيين	Shumūs Barakāt al-Rabbāniyīn	1383	1435	2015
STS 49	انهار فيوض الفاطميين	Anhār Fūyūz al-Fātimiyyīn	1384	1436	2016

== Recognition ==
Saifuddin was conferred Doctor of Theology by Aligarh Muslim University on 15 April 1946, and later c. 1953 accepted the chancellorship for which he was elected to for four consecutive terms.

Saifuddin was among the first to be conferred Doctor of Laws by Karachi University c. 1955.

Saifuddin was voted among 100 Greatest Indian Muslims of the Twentieth Century in an opinion poll run by Milli Gazette.

== Death ==
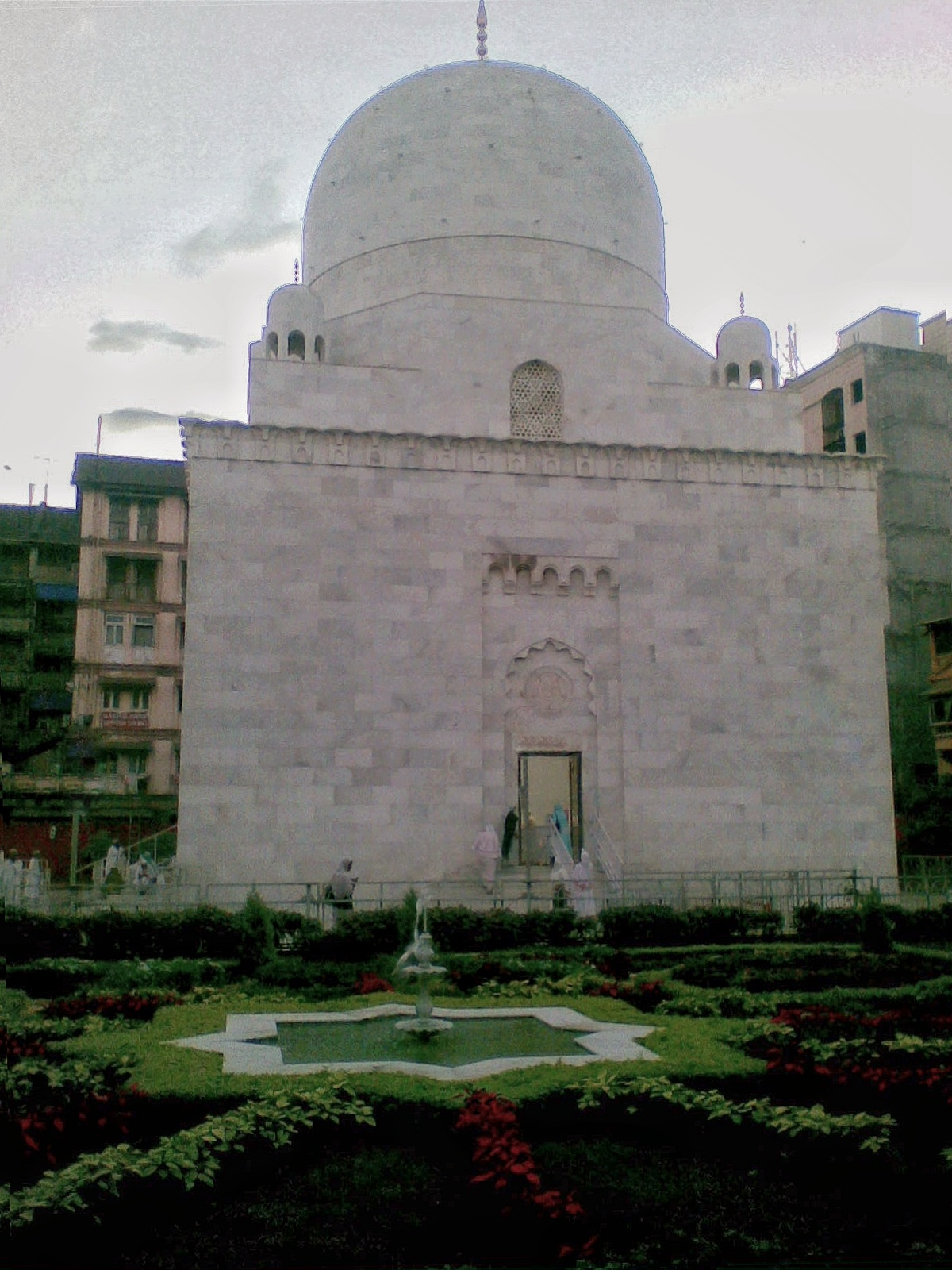
Raudat Tahera in Mumbai, Saifuddin's final resting place, built by his son Mohammed Burhanuddin, inaugurated by Fakhruddin Ali Ahmed, the fifth President of India, in 1975.

Saifuddin died on 12 November 1965 (19 Rajab al-Asab 1385H) at Matheran, a hill-station in Maharashtra, India. He is buried at Raudat Tahera, a mausoleum opposite Ghurrat-ul Masajid in South Bombay, constructed by his successor, Mohammed Burhanuddin.

== Legacy ==
=== The Dandi Memorial ===
Saifuddin donated his home Saifee Villa in Dandi, Navsari where Gandhi stayed for ten days during his historic march from Sabarmati Ashram against the English Salt Laws, to Nehru in 1961. It was later converted into a National Museum. Present day, it lies adjacent to the 15-acre National Salt Satyagraha Memorial which was inaugurated by Narendra Modi in 2019.

=== Aligarh Muslim University ===
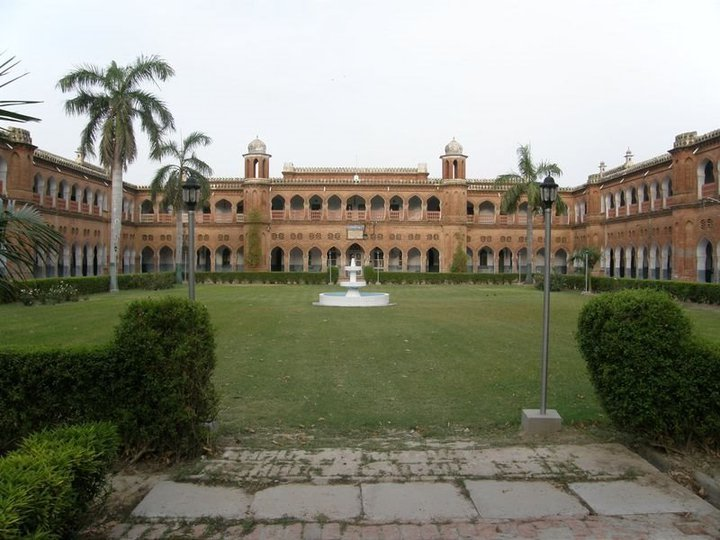
The Syedna Taher Saifuddin School at Aligarh.

The Syedna Taher Saifuddin School at Aligarh Muslim University (AMU) is named after him in his honour. Saifuddin was the longest serving chancellor at AMU at 12 years, and was a patron of the Ali Society at AMU.

=== Hospitals ===
Saifee Hospital in Mumbai, inaugurated by Prime Minister Manmohan Singh in 2005, was dedicated to Saifuddin by his successor, Mohammed Burhanuddin, who built the hospital in social service. Saifee Hospital was one of the first responders to 2008 Mumbai Terror Attacks. Another hospital of the same name was built by Mohammed Burhanuddin in Karachi and dedicated to his father.

=== Housing ===
In 2009 Mohammed Burhanuddin founded Saifee Burhani Upliftment Trust (SBUT), a large-scale cluster redevelopment project in Bhendi Bazaar and dedicated it to his father, Saifuddin. The Government of Maharashtra plans to develop Kamathipura, one of the oldest neighborhoods of South Mumbai, after the cluster redevelopment model pioneered by SBUT.

=== Remembrance ===
Saifuddin's urs (lit. 'death anniversary') is commemorated annually by the Dai al-Mutlaq at Saifee Masjid, South Bombay. Aljamea-tus-Saifiyah's annual examinations, Imtihan al-Sanawi, commence after the Dai al-Mutlaq delivers the Zikra sermons in remembrance of Saifuddin.

=== Memorials ===
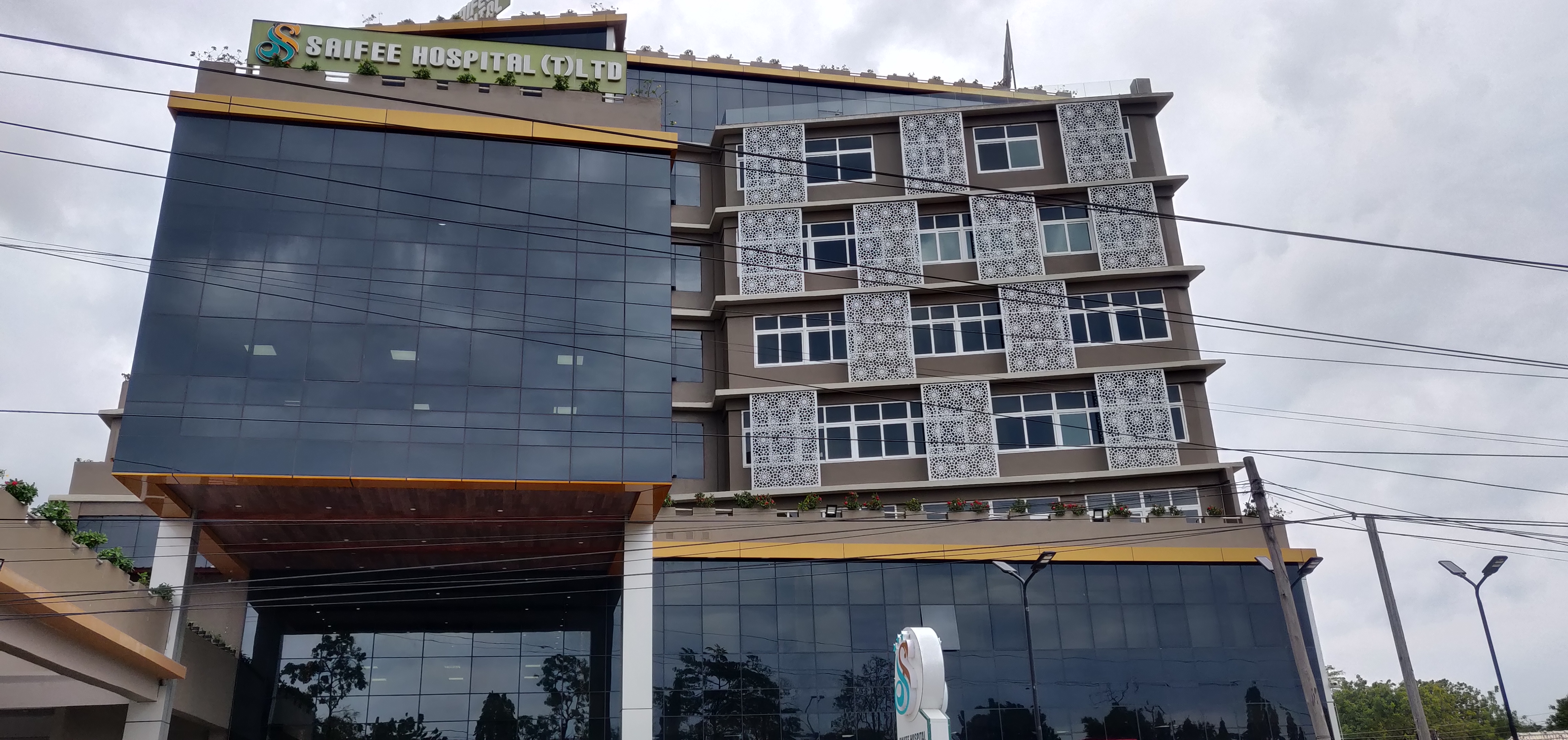
Saifee Hospital in Dar es Salaam.

Shortly after Saifuddin's demise, on 18 March 1966 Mohammed Burhanuddin established His Holiness Dr. Syedna Taher Saifuddin Memorial Trust for educational and medicinal financial aid for institutions and individuals.

In memory of his father Burhanuddin set up Matheran Memorial Hall, a museum and lodging facility in the hill station of Matheran, where Saifuddin died.

== See also ==
- List of Dai of Dawoodi Bohra

Shia Islam titles
Taher Saifuddin Dā'ī al-Mutlaq Born: 4 August 1888 Died: 12 November 1965
Preceded by Abdullah Badruddin	51st Da'i al-Mutlaq; 1915-1965	Succeeded by Mohammed Burhanuddin
