= Bhendi Bazaar =

- Commercial, Shopping
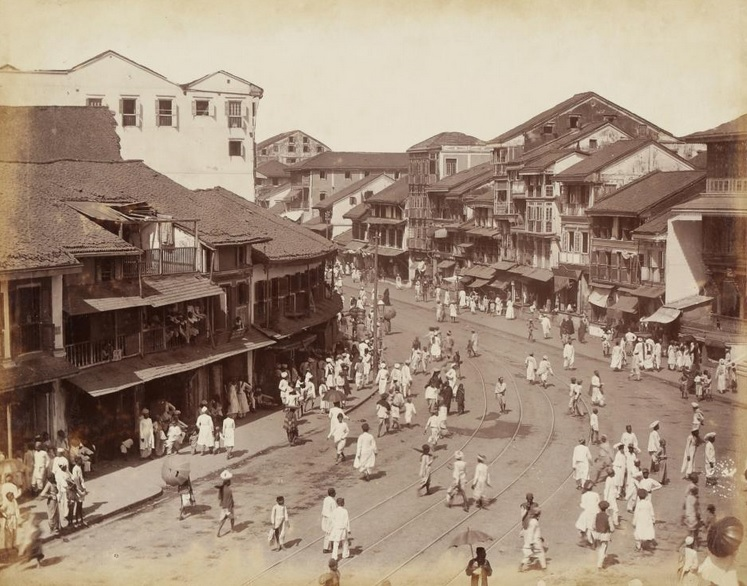
- Old Bhindi Bazaar

- Location in Mumbai, India
- Country: India
- State: Maharashtra
- District: Mumbai City
- City: Mumbai

Government
  - Type: Municipal Corporation
  - Body: Brihanmumbai Municipal Corporation (MCGM)

Languages
  - Official: Marathi
- Time zone: UTC+5:30 (IST)
- Area code: 022
- Civic agency: BMC

Bhendi Bazaar is a market (bazaar) in South Mumbai, Maharashtra, India. Bhendi Bazaar occupies an area between Mohammed Ali Road and Khetwadi. The closest Central and Harbour lines station for the Mumbai Suburban Railway is Sandhurst Road, and the closest Western railway stations are Charni Road and Grant Road. The bazaar is popular for shopping viz antique and hardware items. It is also home to the popular Bhendibazaar gharana of Hindustani classical music.

There are other markets surrounding Bhendi Bazaar such as Crawford Market (Phule Market), Chor Bazaar, Nul Bazaar, and other smaller ones.

== Etymology ==
A theory posits that name comes from the British living on the southern division of the Crawford Market (or Crawford Bazaar), who used to call the northern side of Crawford Market - "behind the Bazaar", which the local people started calling Bhindi or Bhendi Bazaar (phonetically similar to the Indian term for Okra - bhindi).

== History ==
During the British Raj, Bhendi Bazaar was built as a labor camp for workers, engaged in the development of Bombay, to stay in. The buildings of the labor camp were later sold to private owners who in turn accommodated tenants based on the local pagri system.

As of 2011, the area is set to be revamped with the project being undertaken by the Saifee Burhani Upliftment Trust initiated by Mohammed Burhanuddin, head of the Dawoodi Bohra community.

== Demographics and culture ==
Bhendi Bazaar is primarily a Muslim-populated area, home to Muslims with origins in all parts of India, especially Maharashtra, Gujarat, Kerala and northern India. Shop-owners and hawkers in this market belong to different religious groups.

Old streets like Saifee Jubilee Street, Khara Tank Road, Dhabu Street (now called Raudat Tahera Street), Pakmodia Street, Zainabia Marg, Tokra Gulli, 1st Cooper Street, 2nd Cooper Street, 3rd Cooper Street, and Chor Bazaar (consisting of Mutton Street and Chimna Butcher street) are populated by Bohri Muslims of the Dawoodi Bohra (a sect of Ismaili Shia Islam) among other Muslim sects.

The area houses Raudat Tahera, the mausoleum of the 51st and 52nd Dai-al-Mutlaq of the Dawoodi Bohras, Taher Saifuddin and Mohammed Burhanuddin. Bhendi Bazaar has the first two wing high-story tower of its own named Al-Saadah.

Bhendi Bazaar is famous for the food delicacies that it has to offer, it has been called 'A Glutton's Guide To Mumbai's Best Bohri Mohalla Food Joints'. A 2010 Bollywood film, Bhindi Bazaar, was shot in the area.

The famous Bollywood singer Mohammad Rafi lived in Bhendi Bazaar when he moved to Bombay from Lahore in the early 1940s. Rafi started his career in playback singing whilst living in a small apartment in Bhendi Bazaar.

== See also ==
- Arcade: a covered passageway with stores along one or both sides.
- Bazaari
- Bedesten (also known as bezistan, bezisten, bedesten) refers to a covered bazaar and an open bazaar in the Balkans.
- Gold Souq: a market trading in gold.
- Haat bazaar - (also known as a hat) an open air bazaar or market in South Asia
- Landa bazaar a terminal market or market for second hand goods (South Asia)
- Market
- Meena Bazaar: a bazaar that raises money for non-profit organisations
- Merchant
- Retail
- Souq - term for bazaar or market place in Arabic speaking countries
- Tabriz Bazaar, Tabriz, Iran: the largest covered bazaar in the world.
