= Joseph Baptista =

Indian politician and activist (1864–1930)

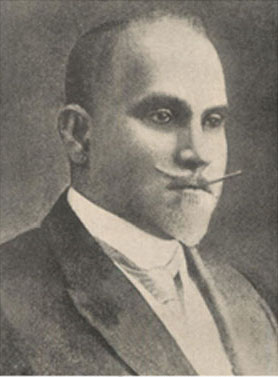

Mayor of Bombay
- In office 1925–1926

Personal details
- Born: 17 March 1864 Matharpacady, Mazagaon, Bombay, British India
- Died: 18 September 1930 (aged 66) Bombay, British India
- Resting place: Sewri cemetery
- Parent: John Baptista
- Education: Barrister
- Alma mater: University of Bombay; University of Cambridge
- Occupation: Engineer in the forest department
- Website: kakabaptista.com

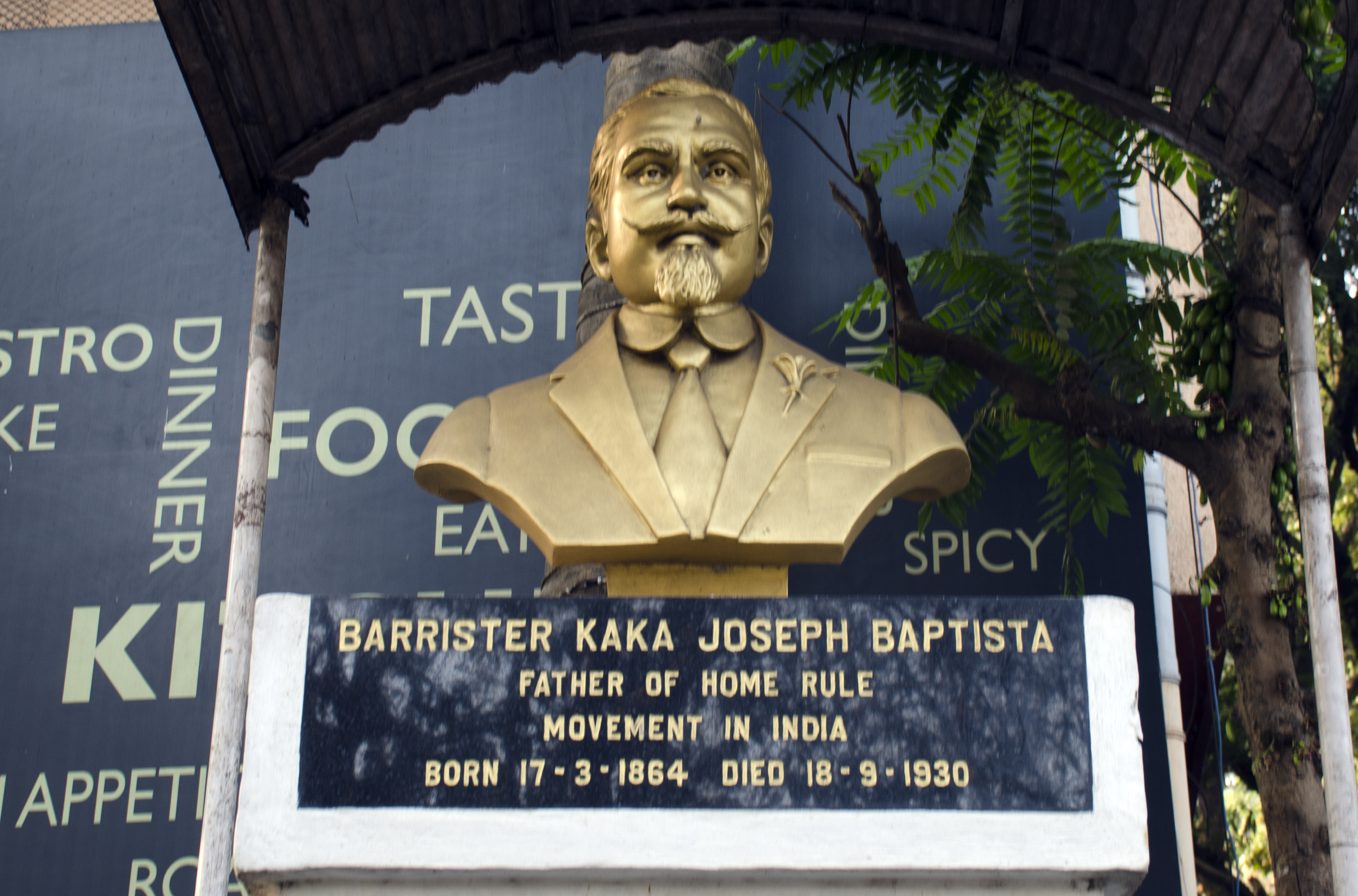
Statue of Joseph Baptista

Joseph Baptista (17 March 1864 – 18 September 1930) was an Indian politician and activist from Bombay (today known as Mumbai), closely associated with the Lokmanya Tilak and the Home Rule Movement. He was the first president of the Indian Home Rule League established in 1916. He was elected as the mayor of Bombay in 1925. He was given the title Kaka that means "uncle".

== Early life ==
Joseph Baptista was born on 17 March 1864, in Matharpacady in Mazagaon, Bombay. His father, John Baptista hailed from Uttan, near Bhayandar. The Baptistas belonged to the East Indian ethnic community.

He completed his early education from St. Mary's School, Mumbai. He then joined the College of Engineering in Pune and later pursued a BA degree in political science from the Fitzwilliam College, Cambridge. During this period, he first met Bal Gangadhar Tilak.

== Political activism ==
In 1901, Baptista joined the Bombay Municipal Corporation, and would be a part of the BMC for the next 17 years. Influenced by the Irish Home Rule movement, Baptista's ideas on an Indian version took root. His ideas deeply influenced Tilak and the two became close associates. He assisted Tilak by launching the Sarvajanik Ganpati (public Ganpati celebrations) to raise nationalistic feelings. In addition, Baptista coined the phrase "Swaraj is my Birthright", that was later made popular by Tilak. In 1916, along with Tilak, Annie Besant founded the Home Rule Movement, with Baptista opening the Belgaum unit. He was also the legal advisor to Lokmanya Tilak. Later he interviewed British Prime Minister David Lloyd George for the British government's views on the Home Rule. In the interview, Baptista gained the impression "that the Cabinet had decided to give India the fullest possible measure of Home Rule without delay."

Baptista was also a practising barrister at the Bombay High Court. One of his most high-profile clients was Vinayak Damodar Savarkar, where he demanded an open trial to assure the dignity of fundamental rights. In 1920, he co-founded the All India Trade Union Congress (AITUC). As a labour leader he took up the cause of mill workers and postmen and other blue collar workers. Although religious, he refused to mix politics and religion refusing to have separate religion-based electorates.

I thoroughly disapprove of separate electorate for Indian Christians in water-tight compartments

In 1925, Baptista was elected as the mayor of the Bombay Municipal Corporation, a post that he occupied for a year.

== Death ==
Baptista died in 1930 and is buried in the Sewri cemetery. The Mazagon Gardens, site of the demolished Mazagaon Fort, near Dockyard Road station is named after him. On 12 October 2008, his tomb at Sewri cemetery was restored with the funds of local MLC Kapil Patil. The ceremony was attended by members of the Bombay Catholic Sabha and Shikshak Bharati, a teacher's organisation.

In 1999, a book on Baptista titled Joseph Baptista: The father of Home Rule in India was released by K R Shirsat at Lalbaug in Mumbai. Through the book, the author hoped that Baptista would be a role model for modern-day youths.

== See also ==
- Home Rule Movement
- Joseph Baptista Gardens
