= Matharpacady =

Matharpacady is a "village" in the Mazgaon area of Mumbai, India, and is one of Mumbai's "heritage precincts". Payal Kapadia, writes that Matharpacady has some of the "oldest and quaintest" houses in Mumbai. Matherpacady is populated by Bombay East Indians a Marathi language speaking, Roman Catholic ethnic group. While it is technically correct that Marathi was the native tongue of the East Indians, the original residents of Mumbai, since the Bombay of that time was a Portuguese colony, East Indian residents of Matharpacady were well versed in Portuguese. However, with the coming of the British Rule the elders of that time realised that fluency in English was the key to better employment opportunities. Which may also explain why Matharpacady's Portuguese heritage is rather downplayed compared to Goa's despite having some of the best preserved Portuguese style architecture. "On the way to and from Church my aunts would speak in Portuguese but they strictly forbade us from speaking in anything but English" so related the late Sheila Gonsalves to her son. Sheila Gonsalves was originally a Lopes and the Lopes home at the entrance to Matharpacady Village is one of the most beautiful and well preserved homes that are representative of the architecture of the late 1800s. Diagonally across from the Lopes home is the "Lion's Den", a popularlandmark, and home of the Leao family sporting two stone lions flanking the entrance. And if you think that there is a connection between the family surname and the lions, the truth is that the house was named for the eldest son Daniel, the biblical figure who was thrown into the Lion's Den. Joseph Baptista, an associate of Bal Gangadhar Tilak was born in Matharpacady.
