= St. Mary's High School SSC =

Location
- Nesbit Road; Mazgaon, Mumbai, Maharashtra, 400010; India; 18°58′12″N 72°50′10″E

Information
- Type: Private junior secondary school
- Religious affiliation: Catholicism
- Denomination: Jesuits
- Established: 1864; 162 years ago
- Principal: Jude Fernandes
- Grades: 6-10
- Gender: Boys
- Athletics: Karate, gymnastics, badminton, cricket, basketball, football
- Accreditation: Central Board of Secondary Education
- Tuition: Rs.45,000
- Website: www.stmarysssc.org

St. Mary’s High School SSC is a private Catholic junior secondary school for boys located in Mazgaon, Mumbai, in the state of Maharashtra, India. The Christian minority institution was founded by the Jesuits in 1864. In 1933, the Secondary School Certificate school split from the adjacent St. Mary's Anglo-Indian School ICSE, with separate buildings and staff. The school covers kindergarten, and grades one through ten.

== History ==
St. Mary's High School lies across Nesbit Road from St. Anne's Church which was established in 1787. St. Mary's High School was founded next to the church to serve military orphans, and then opened to the Catholic populace in general.

== See also ==
- List of Jesuit schools
- List of schools in Mumbai
- Violence against Christians in India
