= St. Mary's School, Mumbai =

St. Mary's School I.C.S.E.

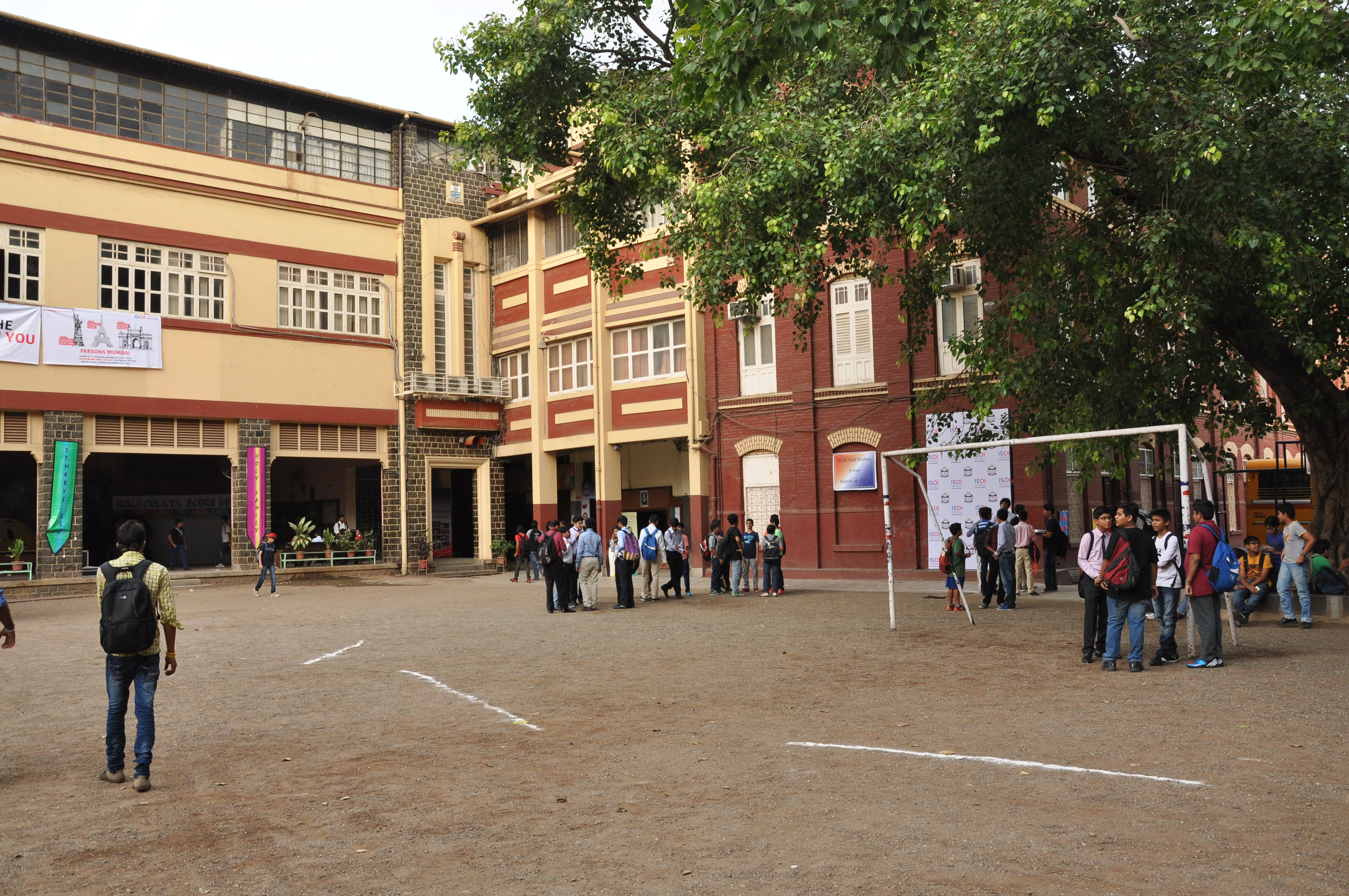
- St. Mary's School During Immaculata

Location
- Nesbit Road, Mazagaon; Mumbai, Maharashtra, 400010; India; 18°58′9.29″N 72°50′9.22″E

Information
- Type: Private secondary school
- Motto: Latin: Immaculata (Perfect commitment)
- Established: 1864; 162 years ago
- Principal: Elias Coelho
- Faculty: 175
- Grades: Junior Preparatory to Class 12
- Gender: Boys
- Enrollment: 1680
- Houses: Ashoka (blue), Gandhi (white), Shivaji (red), Tagore (green)
- Colours: Blue, green, red and white
- Song: St. Mary's Boys!
- Sports: Football, cricket, basketball, table tennis, badminton, athletics
- Publication: The School Tie
- Alumni: Old Marians
- Website: www.stmarysicse.com

St. Mary's School, Mumbai or St. Mary's School I.C.S.E, I.S.C and International, is a private Catholic secondary school for boys, soon to turn into a co-education school, located in Mazagaon, Mumbai, in the state of Maharashtra, India. Founded by the Jesuits in 1864, the school is affiliated with the Indian Certificate of Secondary Education (ICSE) and the International General Certificate of Secondary Education (IGCSE). The school is amongst the oldest, continually running, private schools in India. It is also ranked amongst the top elite day schools in the country.

== History ==
St. Mary's School was founded in 1864 by members of the Society of Jesus (Jesuits), a Roman Catholic religious order founded by St. Ignatius of Loyola in 1540. The school is located adjacent to St. Anne's Church which was established in 1860. The school began as a Catholic school of education and a military orphanage. Later it opened to the Catholic populace in general, which led to expansion and to the construction of the building that now houses the senior school, whose foundation stone was laid by Lord Linlithgow, the Viceroy of India from 1936 to 1943. At present, the school has four Gothic-style buildings and is divided into Senior School (grades 5 and above) and Junior School (grades 4 and below). The school offers various sports facilities to the students, which include a gymnasium, basketball arena, and two grass turfed football grounds.

In 1933, St. Mary's High School SSC was carved out of the main St. Mary's School – which at the time offered the British General Certificate of Education to offer students the opportunity to focus on completion of the Secondary School Certificate. St. Mary's switched to the ICSE Indian Certificate of Secondary Education curriculum in the year 1958 – thereby, becoming one of the early adopters of the system. The school re-commenced offering the Indian School Certificate diploma (equivalent to the Cambridge A-Level) in 2021.

In recognition of its contribution in the field of education the Chief Postmaster General for Maharashtra released a special postal cover commemorating the school's 150th anniversary on 7 December 2013.

In anticipation for the school's 150th year celebration in June 2012 , the school organised Immaculata, an inter-school fest built ground-up by students, which has now grown into a yearly celebration of talent with several sections to participate in. It is one of Mumbai's most anticipated interschool festivals. As of 2026, the event is in its 12th edition, with the theme 'Level Up'.

St. Mary's has continually been ranked amongst the top schools of the country. As per Education World's 2021–2022 survey, the school is ranked 2nd nationwide in the category of 'Day School for Boys'.

Students are encouraged in the arts and sports. Many amongst the school's alumni have flourished in theatre, music, and Bollywood.

== Principals ==
The following individuals have served as principal of the school:

- Fr. Pereira, S.J, ??-1982
- Fr. Casale, S.J., 1982-1991
- Fr. Joe Saldanha, S.J., 1991–1995
- Fr. Joe Diabrio, 1995
- Fr. Evarist Newnes, S.J., 1997–2009
- Alice Carvalho, 2009–2011
- Fr. Dr. Kenneth Misquitta, S.J., 2011–2015
- Fr. Dr. Francis Swamy, S.J., 2015–2021
- Clementine Monteiro, 2021–2024
- Fr. Jude Fernandes, 2025-2025
- Austine Vas, 2025–2026
- Elias Coelho, 2026-Present

== Notable alumni ==
Business and economics

- Dilip Abreu – Princeton economist
- Azim Premji – Chairman of Wipro
- Gautam Singhania – Chairman & MD of Raymond Group

Law

- Joseph Baptista – barrister, unionist, political activist, founder of the Indian Home Rule movement, and Mayor of Bombay
- A. G. Noorani – lawyer, constitutional expert and political commentator
- Homer Pithawalla – leading expert in corporate law and competition law; Professor of Law at Government Law College, Mumbai
- Goolam Essaji Vahanvati – Attorney General of India

Literature

- Homi K. Bhabha – professor at Harvard University
- Dom Moraes – writer and poet
- Altaf Tyrewala – Author and Columnist

Performing arts

- Sooraj Barjatya – Hindi film director
- Tushar Hiranandani – Hindi film director
- Boman Irani – theatre and Bollywood actor
- Arjun Mathur – Bollywood actor
- Zubin Mehta – orchestral conductor
- Freddie Mercury – singer, songwriter and lead vocalist of the Queen (band)
- Sorabh Pant – stand-up comedian
- Farooq Sheikh – Bollywood actor
- Vinod Khanna – Bollywood actor
- Kunal Vijaykar – actor and director
- Madan Mohan (composer) – Composer

Medicine

- Tehemton Erach Udwadia – gastroenterologist

Sports

- Shishir Hattangadi – Mumbai cricket team captain
- Vijay Mohanraj – Ranji Trophy cricketer for Mumbai
- Rehan Poncha – Olympic swimmer (2008 Summer Olympics), Arjuna Awardee
- Adille Sumariwalla – Olympic sprinter (1980 Summer Olympics), Arjuna Awardee
- Rajesh Sanghi - Ranji Trophy Cricket for Rajasthan

Science

- Vijay Balasubramanian – theoretical physicist and professor at the University of Pennsylvania

== See also ==
- List of Jesuit schools
- List of schools in Mumbai
- Violence against Christians in India
