= Tyrewala =

Tyrewala is an Indian surname. Notable people with the surname include:

- Abbas Tyrewala (born 1974), Indian film screenwriter
- Altaf Tyrewala (born 1977), Indian author
- Paakhi Tyrewala (fl. 1995), Indian writer
