= Mazgaon Fort =

Mazagaon Fort
- Location within Mumbai

General information
- Type: Fort
- Location: Mazagaon, Mumbai
- Coordinates: 18.965633°N 72.842703°E
- Elevation: 32 m (105 ft)
- Completed: 1680
- Destroyed: 8 June 1690
- Demolished: 8 June 1690
- Client: British

The Mazagaon Fort was a British fort in Mazagaon, Bombay (present-day Mumbai), in the Indian state of Maharashtra, built around 1680. The fort was razed by the Muslim Koli general, Yakut Khan in June 1690. The fort was located at the present-day Joseph Baptista Gardens, atop Bhandarwada Hill outside the Dockyard Road railway station.

== History ==
Up to the eighteenth century, Bombay consisted of several small islands. In 1661, seven of these islands were ceded by the Portuguese to the British as part of the dowry of Catherine of Braganza when she married Charles II of England. The harbour proved eminently apposite, and the British planned to shift their base from Surat. The Siddis, who were of African descent and noted for their navies, had allied themselves with the Mughals. The British, through the East India Company, and the Mughals were constantly waging war on each other. As allies of the Mughals, the Siddis also viewed the British as enemies.

Faced with relentless attacks by the Siddis in 1672, The British constructed several fortifications in the area, and in 1680 the Sewri fort was complete. It stood on the island of Mazagaon, on a hill overlooking the eastern seaboard.

In 1689, the Siddi general, Yakut Khan, with an army of 20,000 men, invaded Bombay. The fleet first captured the Sewri Fort, then the Mazagon Fort, before sacking the town of Mahim. In April 1689, the Siddis laid siege to the British fortification to the south. The British governor Sir John Child appealed to the Mughal Aurangzeb to reign in Sakat for a price. In February 1690, the Mughal emperor agreed, on the conditions that rupees 1.5 lakhs (150,000) (over one billion USD at 2008 conversion rates) be paid, and Child be sacked. Child's untimely death in 1690, however, resulted in his escaping the ignominy of being sacked.

Enraged at barter, Sakat withdrew his forces on 8 June 1690, after razing the Mazagaon Fort.

In 1884, the British developed Bhandarwada Hill as a major water reservoir. It supplies water to South and Central Mumbai. A popular recreation ground, the ground is named after Joseph Baptista, a freedom fighter and close aide of the Indian freedom movement activist, Bal Gangadhar Tilak.

== See also ==
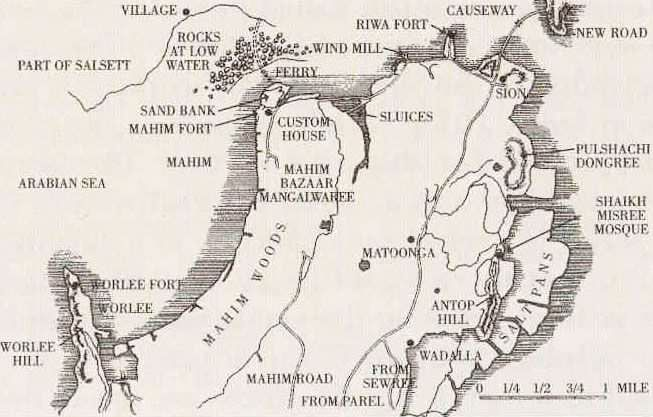
Old map of the region (post 1805)

- Mazagaon
- Mazagaon Gardens
- Sewri Fort

== See also ==
- List of forts in Maharashtra
