= Sewri =

Sewri Shivdi
- Neighbourhood
- Location within Mumbai
- Coordinates: 19.00°N 72.86°E
- Country: India
- State: Maharashtra
- District: Mumbai City
- City: Mumbai

Government
  - Type: Municipal Corporation
  - Body: Brihanmumbai Municipal Corporation (MCGM)

Languages
  - Official: Marathi
- Time zone: UTC+5:30 (IST)

Sewri (IAST: Śivdī, [ʃiʋɖiː]) is a locality along the eastern edge of South Mumbai, in Maharashtra, India. It is also the name of a railway station on the Central Railway Harbour Line.

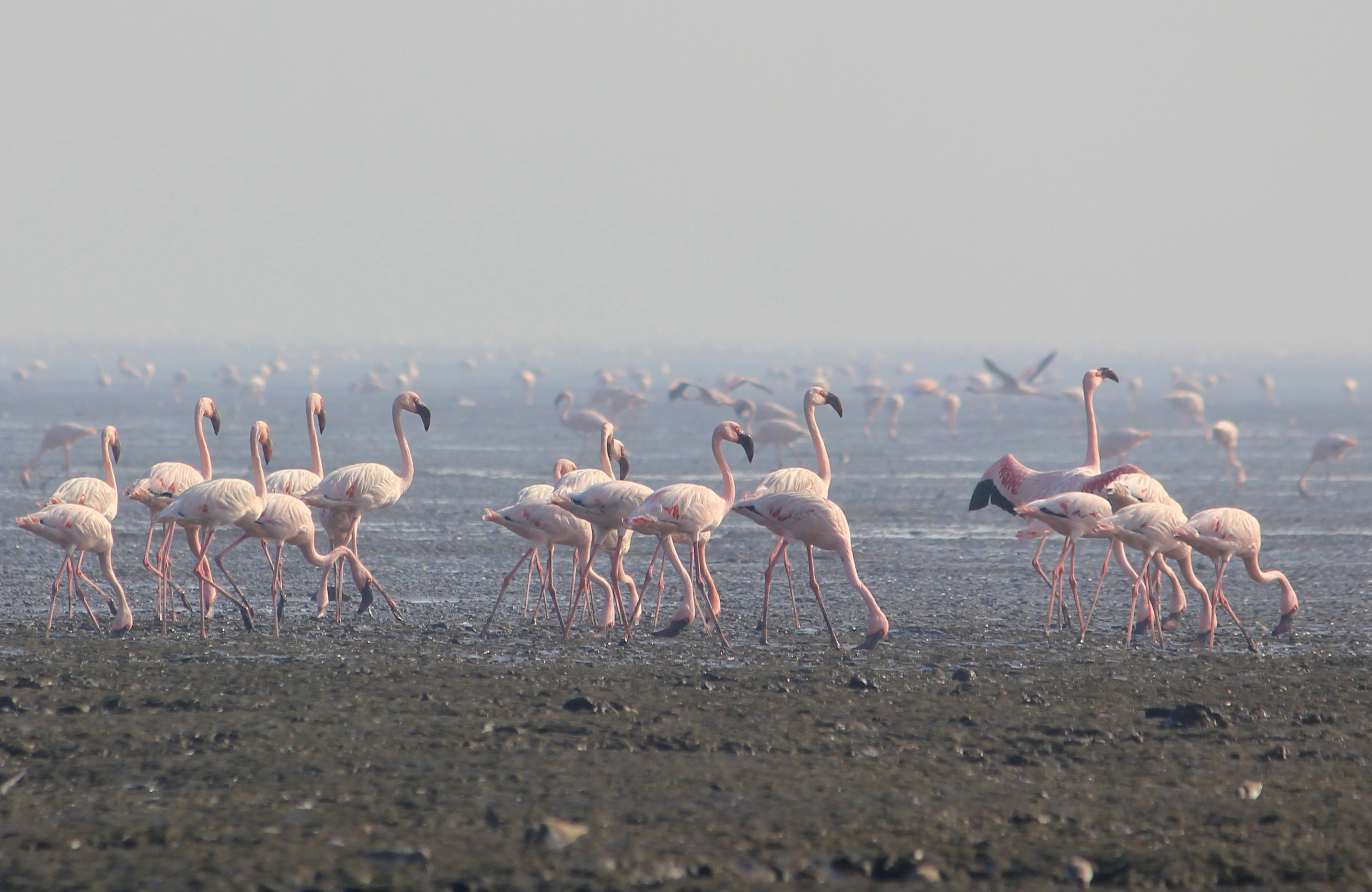
Lesser flamingos at Sewri jetty mudflats in early morning (January,2013)

Sewri (pronounced as Shivdi / शिवडी) is a small hamlet on the eastern shore of the Parel island, one of the original seven islands of Bombay. Sewri has a fort that dates back to 1770. The Agri-Horticultural Society had established gardens at Sewri, which were acquired in 1865 by Arthur Crawford, then the Municipal Commissioner of Bombay, for building a European cemetery. Large parts of Sewri belong to the Bombay Port Trust and were incorporated into the harbour facilities. In 1996, the mangrove swamps of Sewri were declared a protected ecology. Lesser flamingos from other parts of India come to these mangroves to breed. The coastal area of locality includes the Sewri mudflats, a wetland. The flamingos arrive at the mudflats from the months of October to March every year. These mudflats are near the Sewri jetty, which is a 20-minute walk from the railway station.

The Rafi Ahmed Kidwai Road (RAK marg) which consist of four adjacent roads begins at Sewri and ends at Maheshwari Udyan (Matunga) near King's Circle station. Fatima High School can be found at the beginning of the RAK road. The Sewri Christian Cemetery, the largest of its kind within city limits, is located here.

Sewri East houses a number of industrial units especially those of Petrochemical industries. Sewri West is largely residential, consisting of housing societies like Sewri Koliwada, BDD Chawls and Mulraj Bhuvan. The Mulraj Bhuvan Group (MBG) is a very famous club in this area known for its sporting and social activities. Built by the British in the year 1925, Dnyaneshwar Nagar, Shivaji Nagar, Gulmohar Society, Labour Camp and Bhatwadi are located here as well. The market area is called "Sewri Naka".

The opening up of mill lands and the Mumbai Port Trust lands for development has resulted in a lot of construction activity in this area. The Sewri-Nhava Sheva transharbour link, which is being planned by the Mumbai Metropolitan Region Development Authority (MMRDA), threatens the habitat of the migratory flamingos.

== Festivals ==
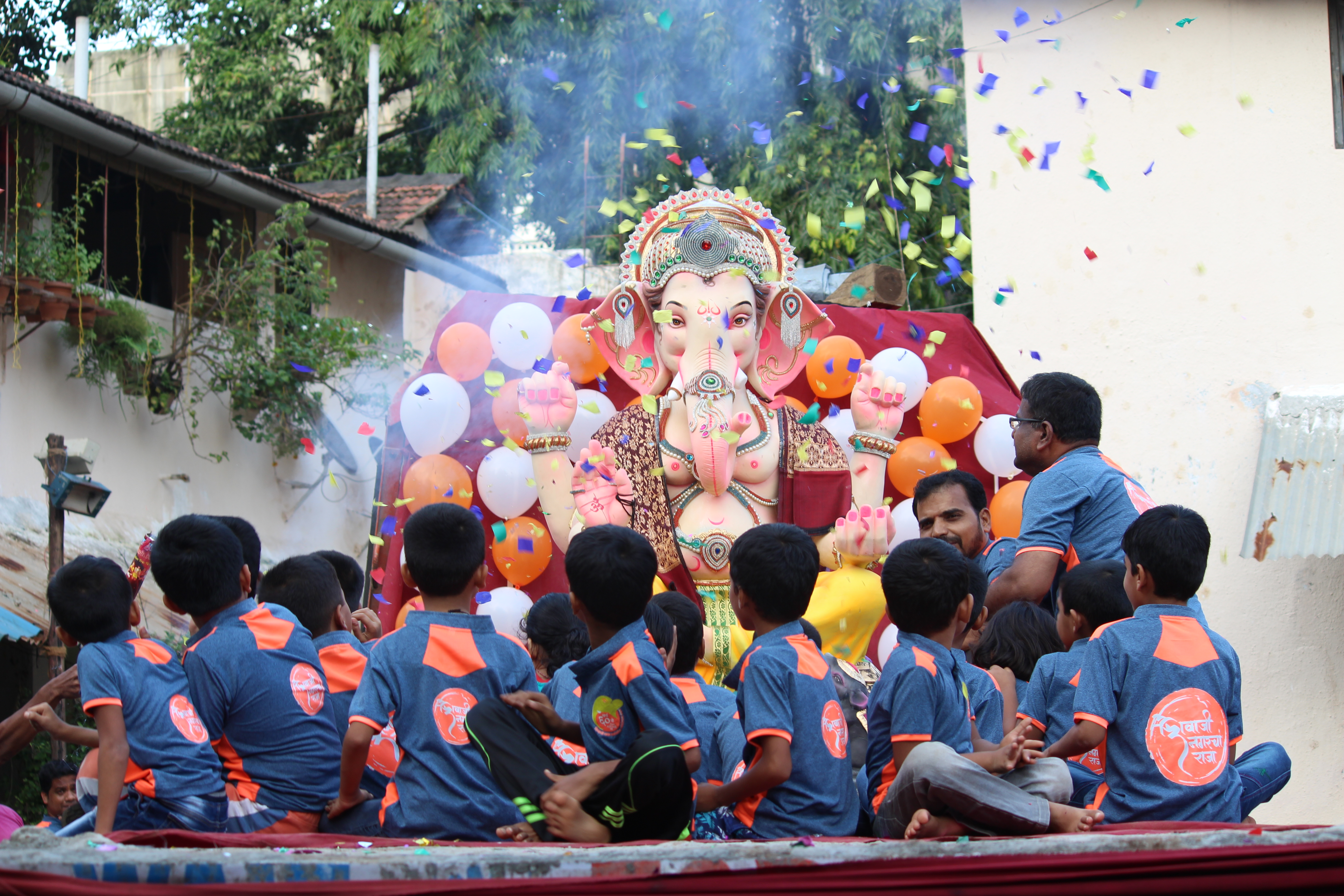
Shivaji Nagar Sarvajanik Ganeshutsav Mandal brings Eco-Friendly Idol of height 6 feet for last 70 years

Ganeshutsav is the Biggest Festival is celebrated here. Pandals like, Shivaji Nagar Sarvajanik Ganeshutsav Mandal, Shivdi cha Raja, Shivdi cha Vighnaharta and T.J Road cha Raja are some famous and old pandals of Sewri.

== Notable for ==
- Lalbaug Parel (Shoot location: Shivaji Nagar)
- "Har Taraf Hain Yeh Shor" (Song shoot location: Shivaji Nagar)
- Our Lady of Fatima Church, Sewri

== Sewri Flamingo Point ==
Sewri Flamingo Point is located at a distance of around 1 kilometre from Sewri railway station. The point has large areas of mudflats which are a safe habitat for flamingos in winter. The mudflats abound in algae, which attracts flamingos who migrate to India every year between the months of October and March to escape the cold winters.

== See also ==
- Sewri Flamingo Point Bombay
