= Altaf Tyrewala =

Indian writer (born 1977)

Altaf Tyrewala (born 1977) is an Indian, English-language author and columnist. He lives in Dallas and works in the elearning industry. Altaf was born in Byculla, Mumbai in a Khoja Ismaili family. He did his schooling at St. Mary's ICSE, Mazagaon. He studied advertising and marketing in New York City, and earned a BBA from Baruch College in 1999 before returning to Mumbai to work on his critically acclaimed debut novel "No God in Sight". The book has been translated into Marathi, German, French, Spanish, Italian and Dutch, and published in the US and Canada. In 2012, he published "The Ministry of Hurt Sentiments" and a collection of short stories "Engglishhh" in 2014.

Tyrewala's short stories have been included in several Indian and international anthologies. His work has been hailed as "more sophisticated and universal than Adiga’s" by some critics.

Tyrewala is a member of the board of advisors for the literary journal The Bombay Review.

== Bibliography ==
- No God In Sight, MacAdam/Cage, 2006
- Ministry of Hurt Sentiments, HarperCollins India, 2012
- Mumbai Noir, Akashic, 2012 (editor)
- Engglishhh, HarperCollins India, 2014
