= Sewri Flamingo Point Bombay =

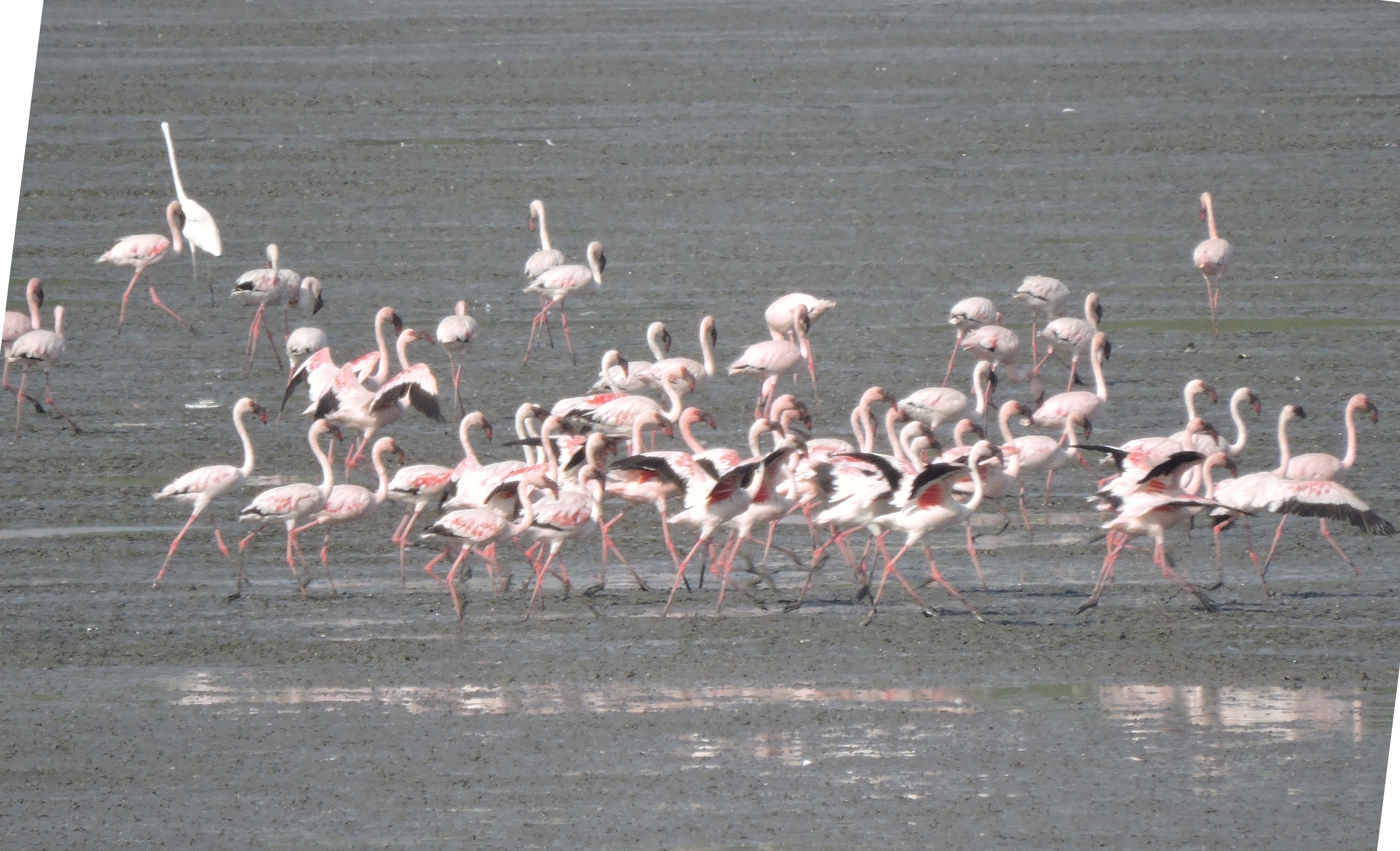
Sewri Flamingo Point, Mumbai, India

Sewri Flamingo Point Mumbai, is a place near Sewri, located in the Maharashtra state of India.

Sewri Flamingo Point is situated one kilometre (20 minutes' walk) from the Sewri railway station.

The landscape has large areas of mudflats which are not only a safe habitat for flamingos in winter but also provide adequate food for the birds. A large number of flamingos gather here with their babies when they migrate from their breeding area, Rann of Kutch in Gujarat, to Sewri every year. They arrive and stay at Sewri Flamingo Point between October and March. Other bird species also come to feed at the flats.

== Gallery ==
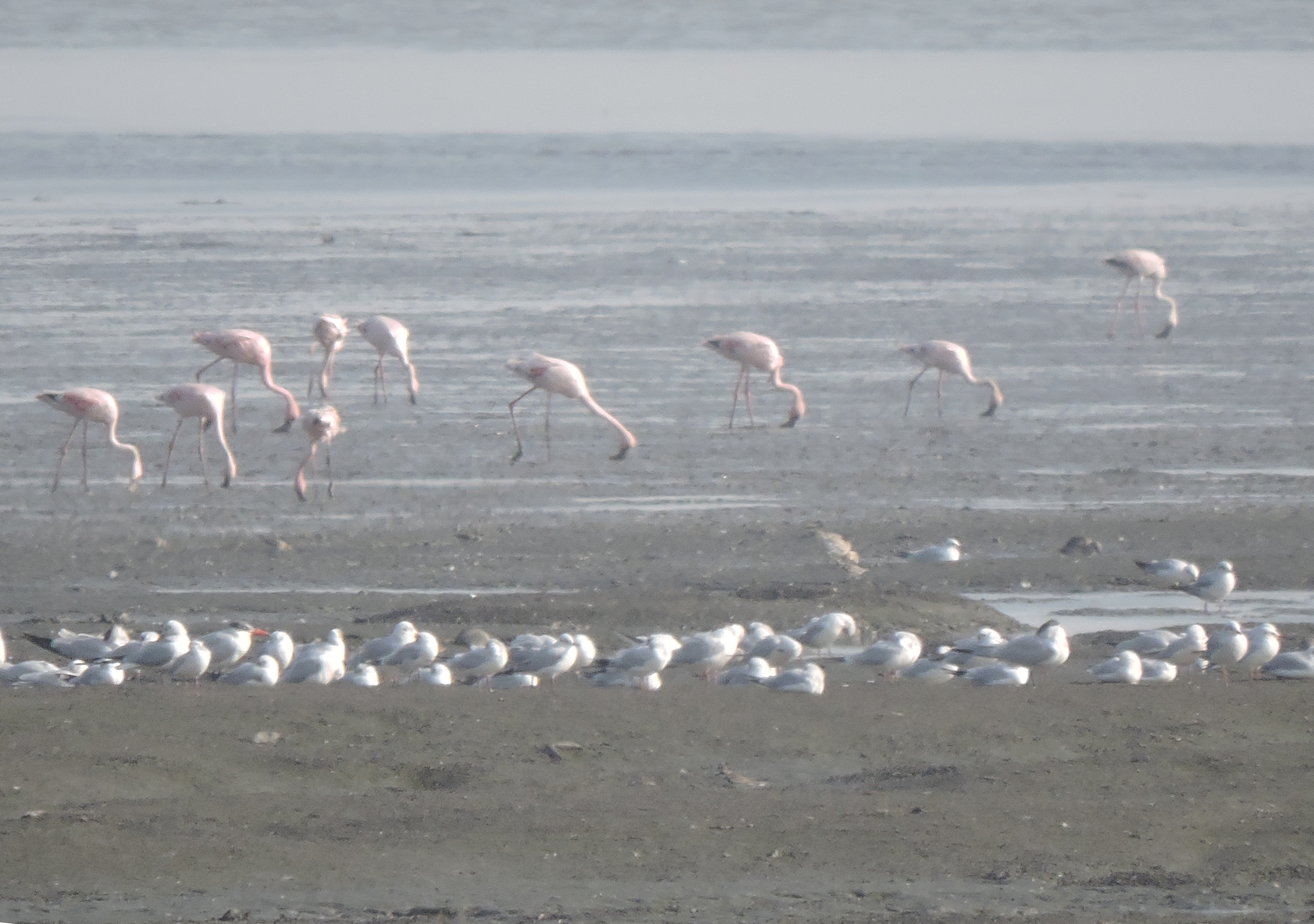

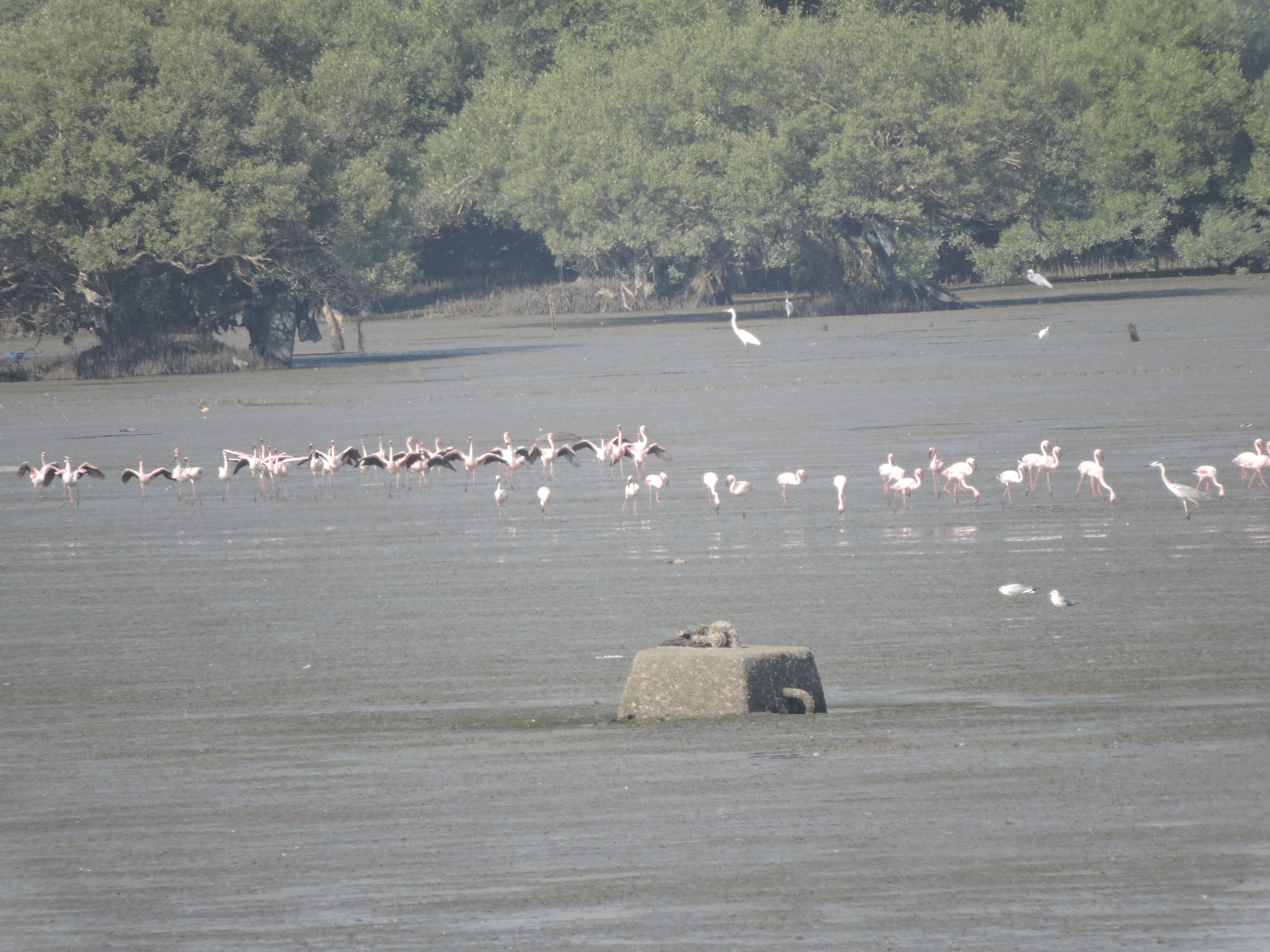

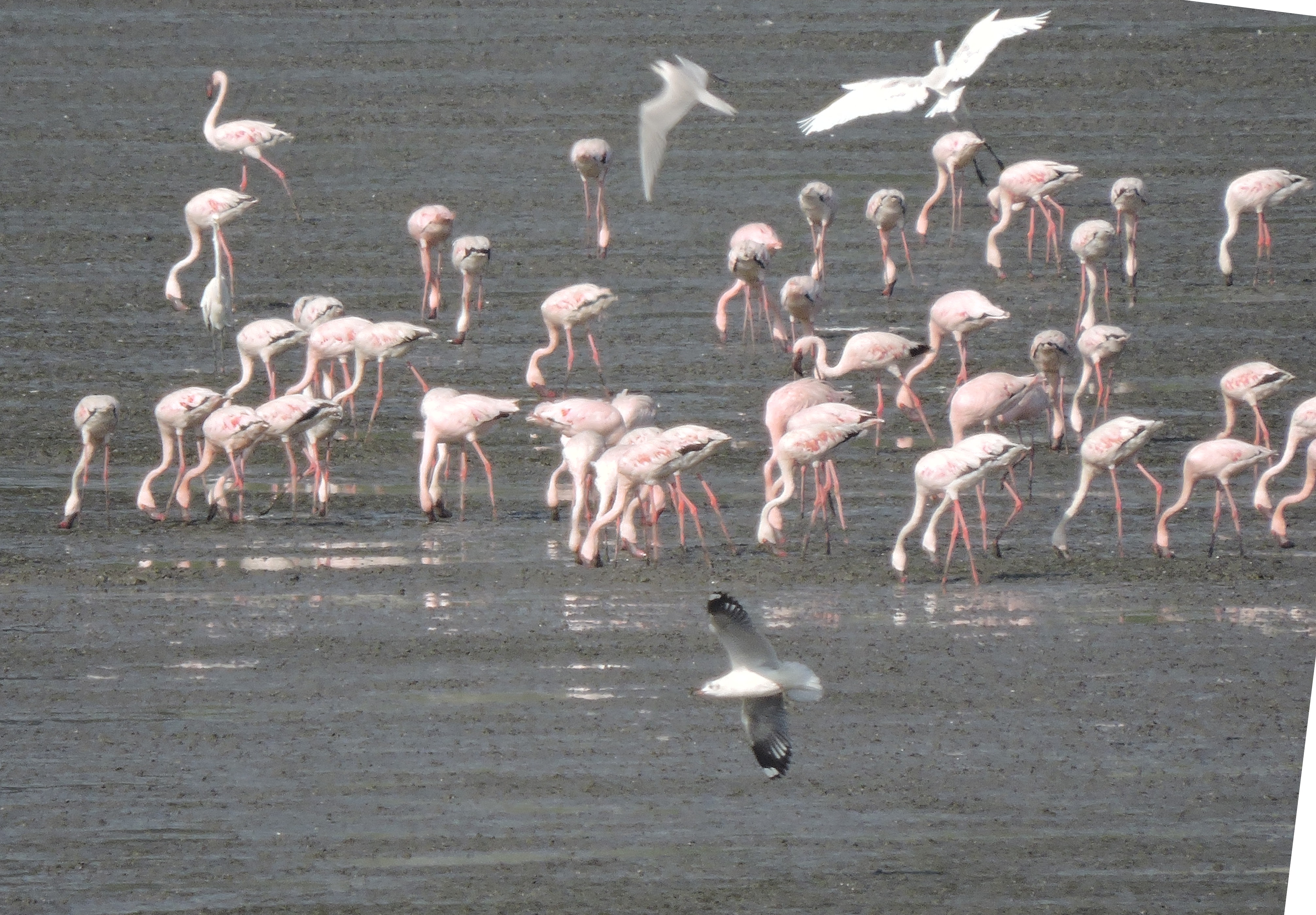

== See also ==
Sewri
