= Joseph Baptista Gardens =

Park in South Mumbai, India

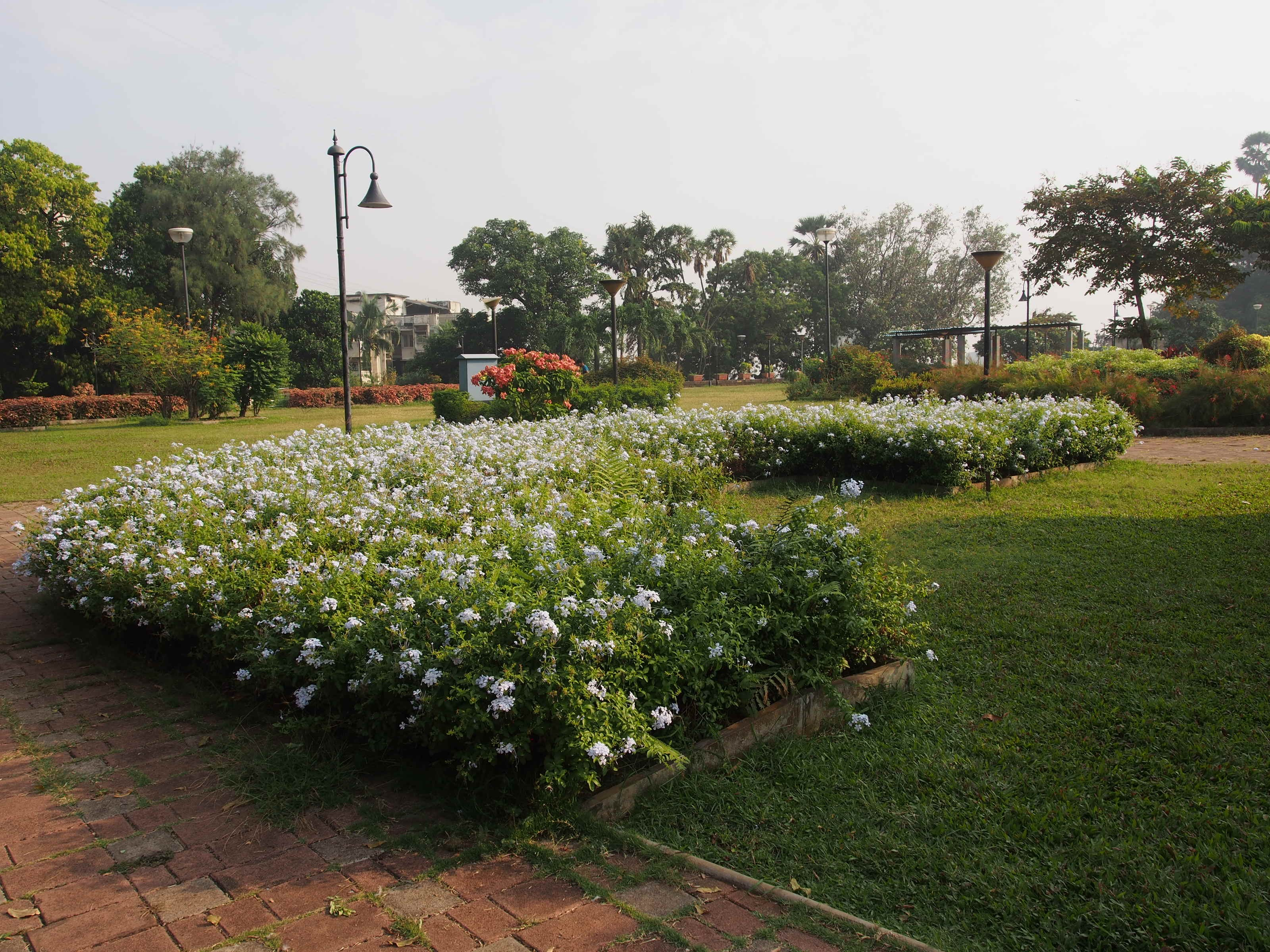
- Interactive map of Joseph Baptista Gardens
- Location: Mazagaon, Mumbai
- Coordinates: 18.965633°N 72.842703°E
- Area: 1.5 acres (0.6 ha)
- Created: 1884
- Operator: Municipal Corporation of Greater Mumbai
- Status: Open all year

The Joseph Baptista Gardens, locally known as the Mazagaon Gardens, is a 1.5-acre (0.6 ha) park in Mazagaon, South Mumbai, India. It lies atop Bhandarwada hill, behind the Dockyard Road railway station, at an altitude of 32 metres (105 ft) and offers a panoramic view of the Mumbai harbour and the southern business district of the city.

It was originally named after John Hay Grant, the Municipal Commissioner of Bombay (1877–1881), who built the public garden spread over 1.5 acres (0.6 ha) above a water reservoir between 1880–1884. Shortly after India's independence in 1947, the gardens were renamed after Joseph Baptista, an Indian freedom activist from Mazagaon.

== History ==
After the British arrived in Bombay in the 1660s, they selected Bhandarwala Hill, a basalt rocky outcrop as a site for the Mazagon Fort, that was built in 1680. However, the fort was completely razed by Siddi ruler Yakut Khan after he withdrew his siege on the orders of the Mughal emperor, Aurangzeb.

In 1884, to address the shortage of potable water in the city, several hills were selected as storage tanks by the civic administration. Water from the Vihar Lake was pumped to the Bhandarwada Hill reservoir, that was then distributed to the city. Over it the John Hay Grant park was built. In 1925, the capacity was increased to 20,000,000 imperial gallons (90,900,000 L).

== Park ==
The park is frequented by neighbourhood residents. It is mostly patronised by couples, joggers, senior citizens, and students who find peaceful corners to study. Cycas, ixora, musanda, bougainvillea, and hibiscus are some of the plants found in the garden. As part of a makeover plan, the Municipal Corporation of Greater Mumbai (BMC) earmarked ₹5.34 million (US$55,452) to beautify the gardens. Local residents however are upset over the plans for the makeover, and have claimed that the BMC have uprooted trees, thrown away wrought iron gates. Work on the renovations is set to be completed by February 2009.

== See also ==
- Malabar Hill
- Kamla Nehru Park
- Mazagaon Fort

== Gallery ==
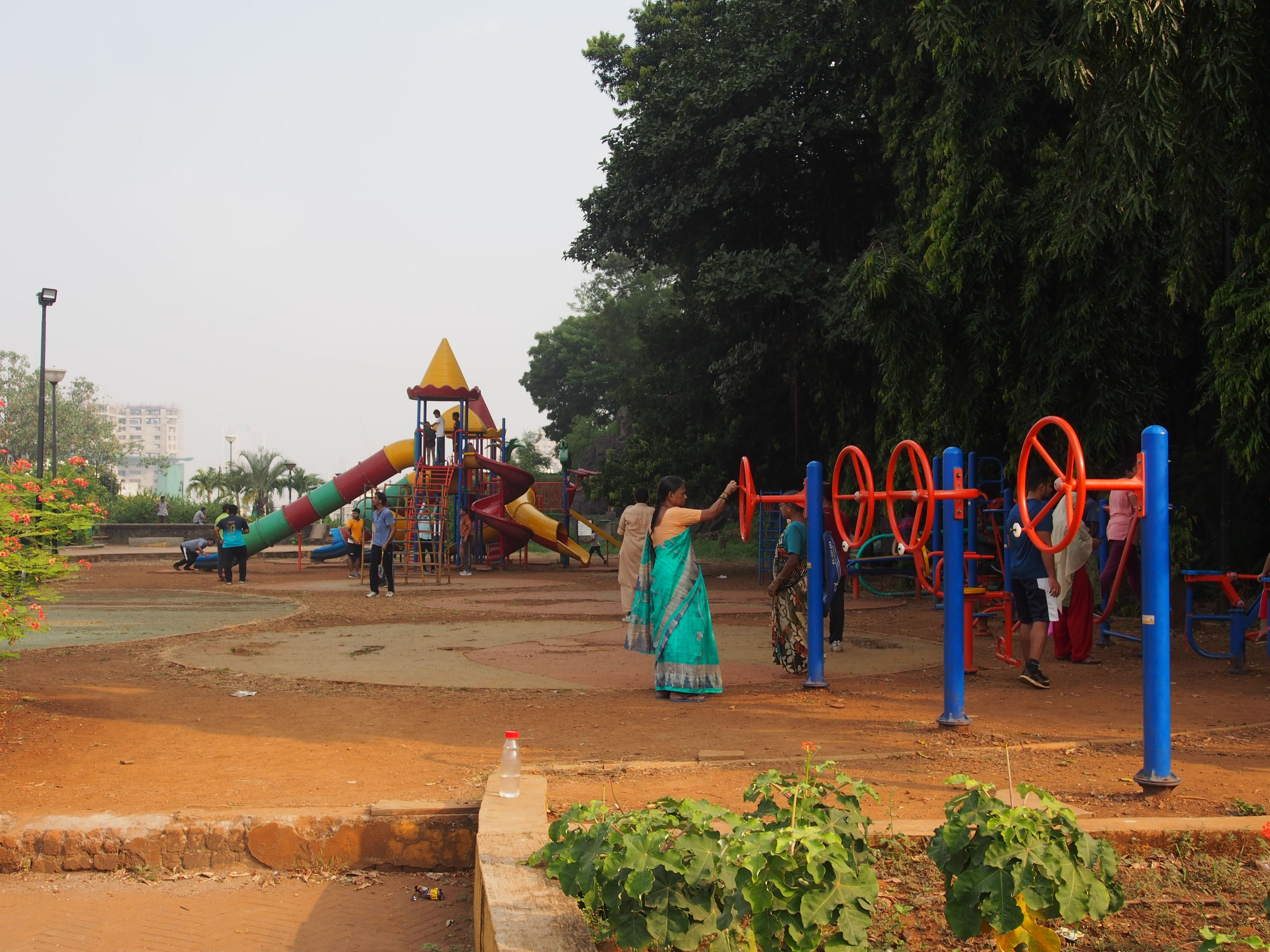
Playing area for kids

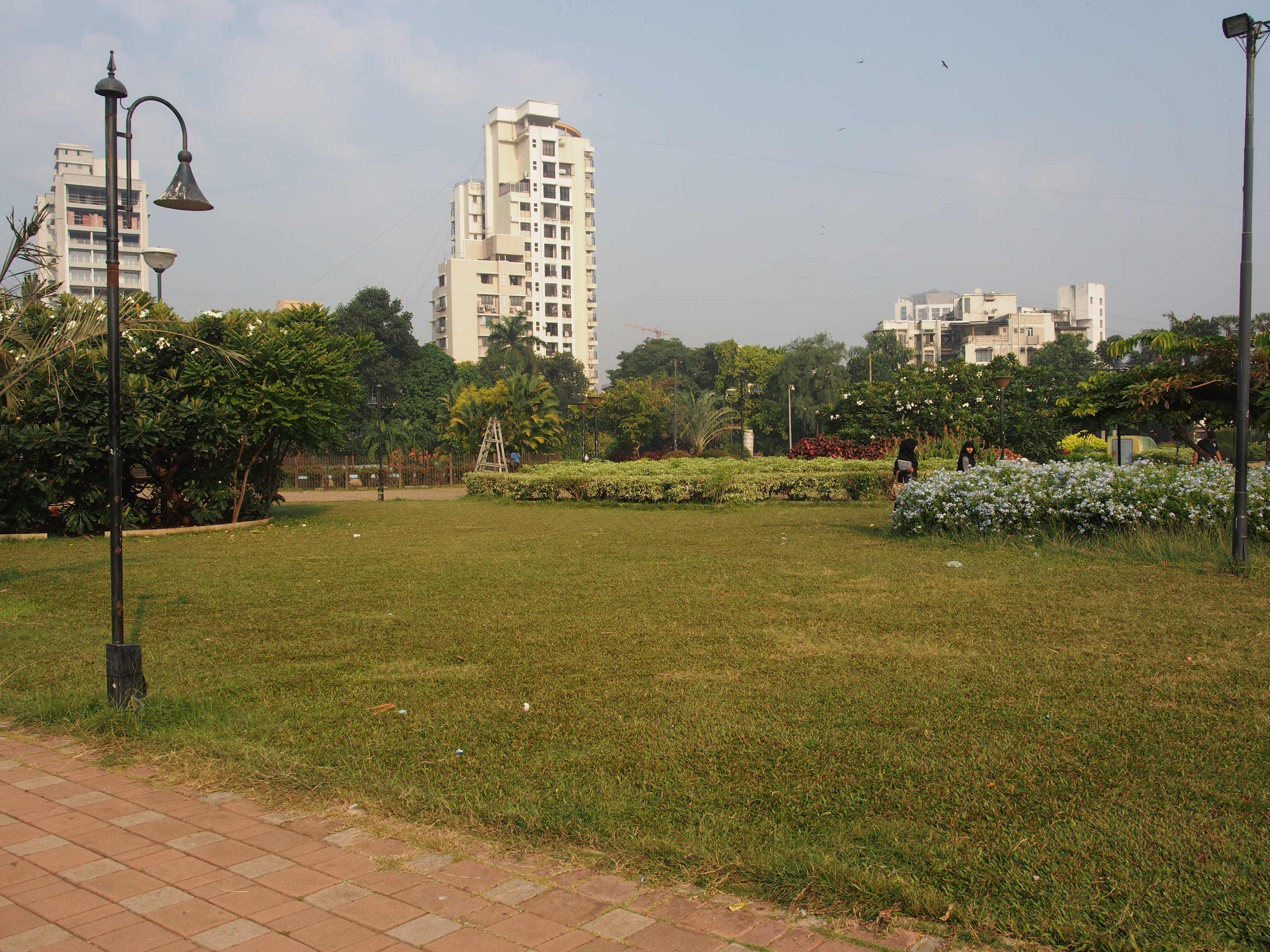
Lawn

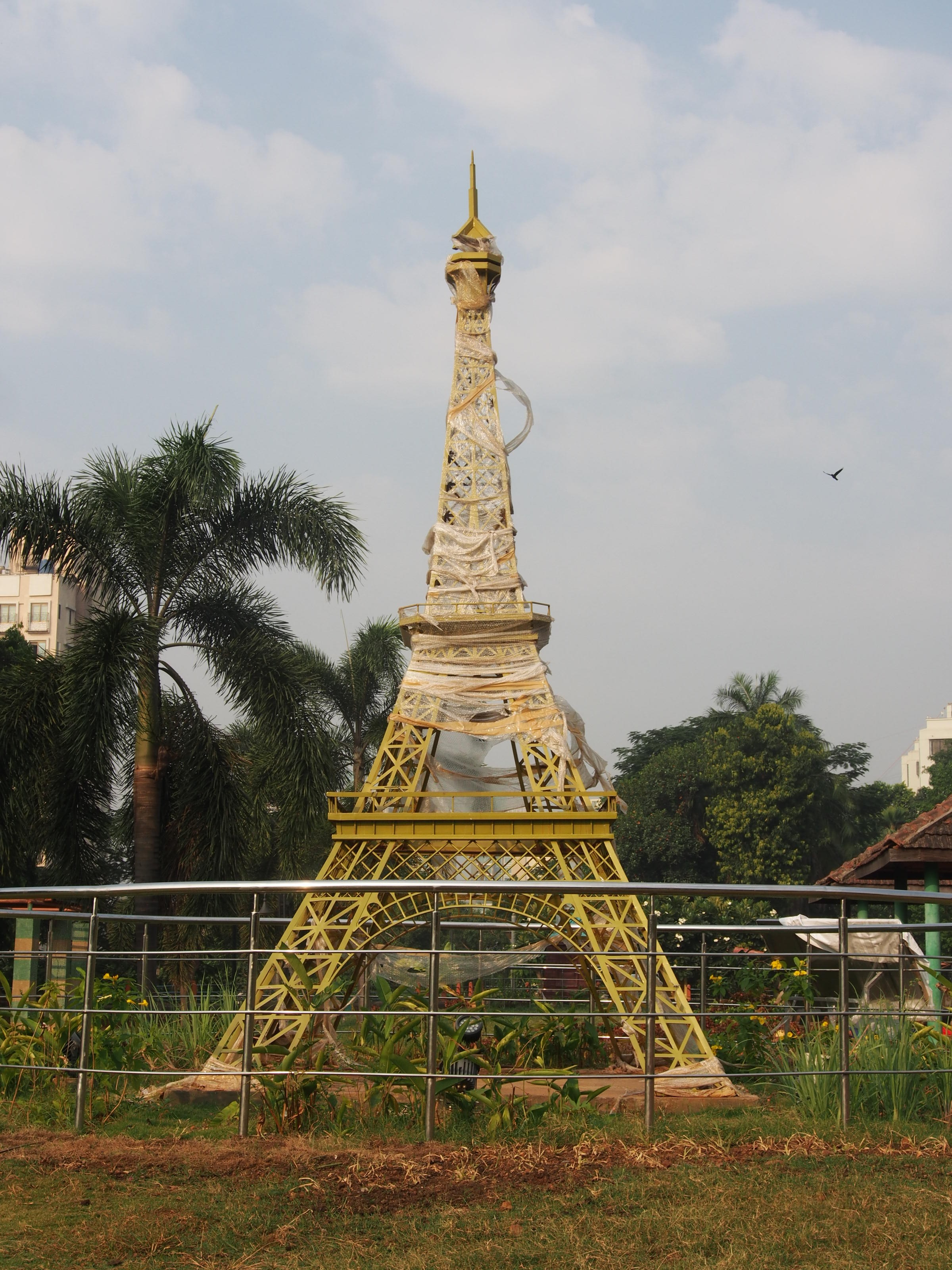
Model of Eiffel Tower

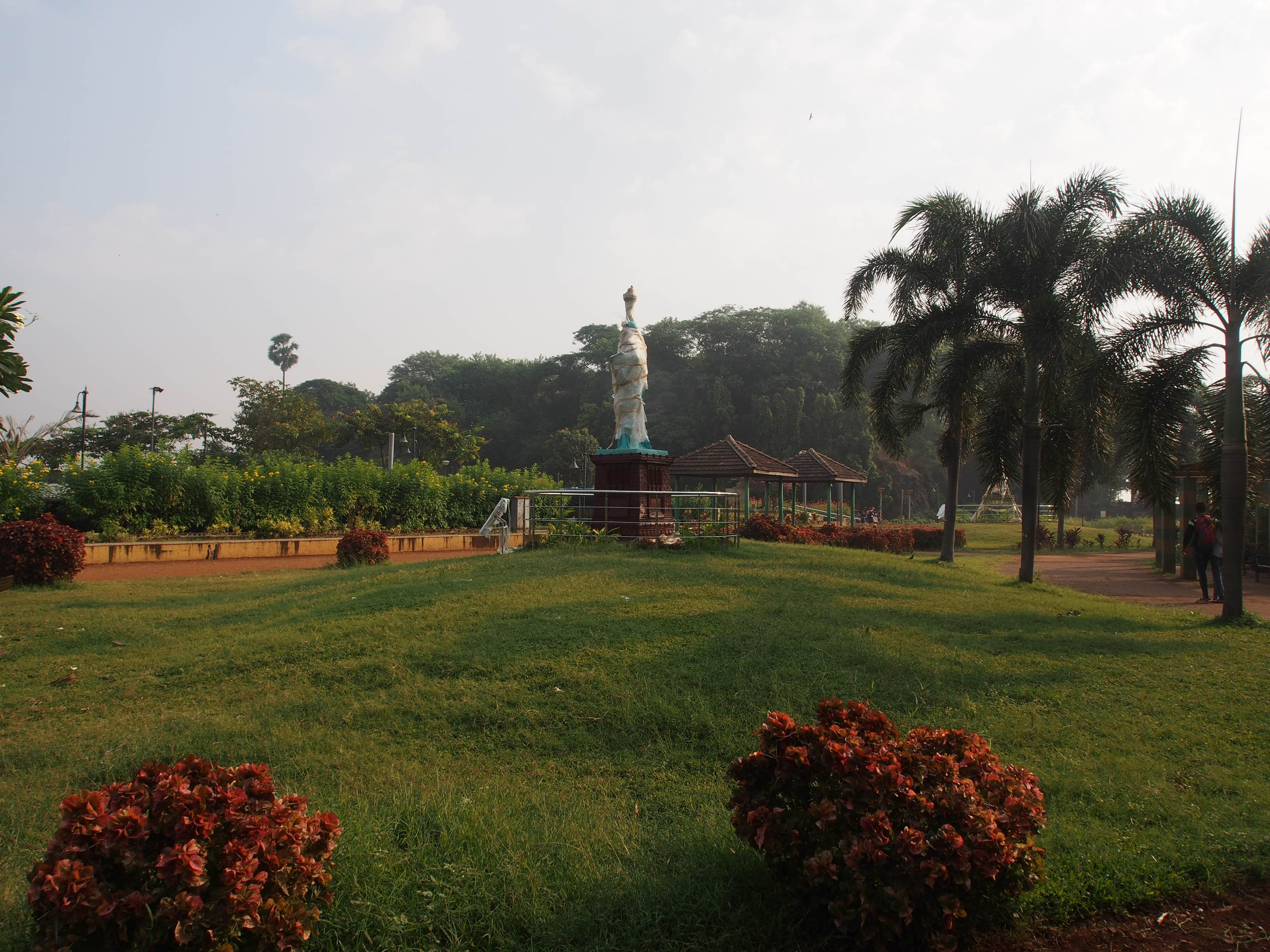
Model of Statue of Liberty

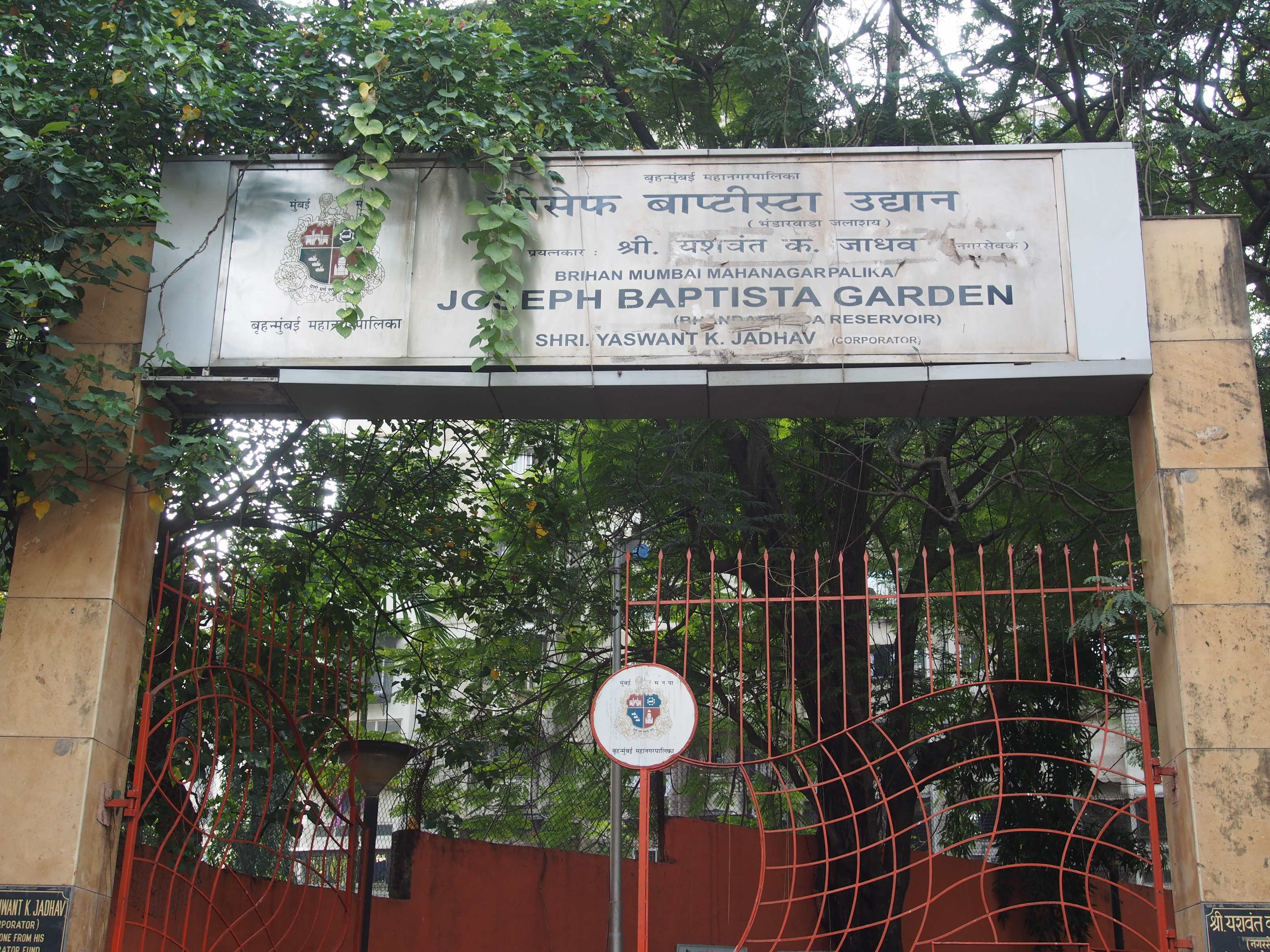
Main gate
