= Sewri Fort =

Hill fort in Mumbai, India

- Sewri, Mumbai, India
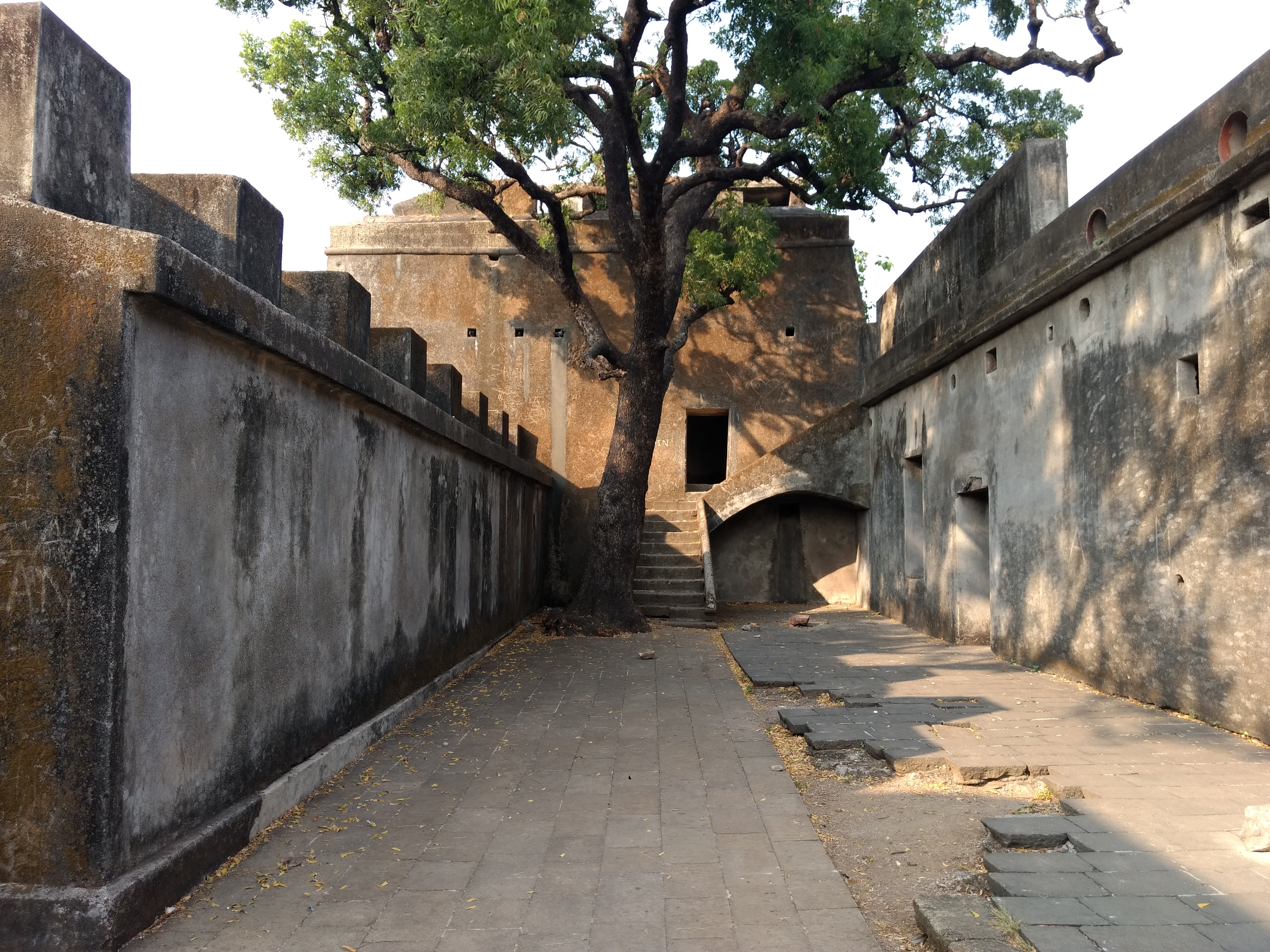
- Courtyard of the Sewri Fort

Site information
- Type: Hill Fort
- Owner: East India Company (1680–1947); Government of India (1947- Present)
- Open to the public: Yes
- Condition: Dilapidated

Location
- Coordinates: 19.000635°N 72.860363°E

Site history
- Built: 1680; 346 years ago
- Materials: Basalt and Lime mortar

The Sewri Fort (also spelled Sewree Fort) is a fort in Mumbai built by the British at Sewri. Built in 1680, fort served as a watch tower, atop a quarried hill overlooking the Mumbai harbour.

== History ==
Up to the eighteenth century, Mumbai consisted of several small islands. In 1661, seven of these islands were ceded by the Portuguese to the British as part of the dowry of Charles II of England. The harbour proved eminently opposite, and the British planned to shift base from Surat to Mumbai. The Siddis, who were of African descent and noted for their navies, had allied themselves with the Mughals. The British, under the East India Company and the Mughals were constantly waged war on each other. As allies of the Mughals, the Siddis also declared the British as enemies.

Faced with relentless attacks by the Siddis in 1672, several fortifications were constructed in Mumbai, and in 1680 the Sewri fort was complete. It stood on the island of Parel, on a hill overlooking the eastern seaboard and Indian mainland. It had a garrison of 50 sepoys and was managed by a subedar. It was also armed with eight to ten cannons.

In 1689, the Siddi general, Yadi Sakat, with an army of 20,000 men, invaded Mumbai. The fleet first captured the Sewri fort, then the Mazagon Fort, before sacking the town of Mahim. The fort was also later involved in a battle that repelled a Portuguese attack in 1772.

After the decline of the regional powers, the fort was subsequently used to house prisoners. It was later converted as a Bombay Port Trust godown.

== Architecture ==
The fort was built primarily for defence, and embellishments are absent. It is bordered by high stone walls, including an inner ring for added protection. It is landlocked on three sides, and sits atop of sheer cliff of about 60 m (197 ft). The entrance is a stone doorway that leads into a courtyard. To prevent a frontal assault from the main entrance, the inner entrances were placed perpendicular to the main entrances.

Architectural highlights include pentagonal room along with a long domed corridor, and linear vaulted structures.

== Conservation ==
The fort is currently owned by Maharashtra state's Department of Archaeology and Museums. It is classified as a Grade I heritage structure, and efforts are underway under Phase I of Mumbai Fort Circuit Project to restore it.

The restoration involves the creation of two zones. Zone I includes the immediate fort area. The crumbling walls are to be repaired, debris cleared off, roofs rebuilt, steps fixed and a garden created in the complex. A museum is also to be constructed. Zone II renovation consists of the surrounding areas that belong to the Mumbai Port Trust. In this, a sea-facing promenade is to be created that links the fort to the waterfront, along with the creation of a landscaped garden, food court, and amphitheatre. The total cost for this project in 2008 is estimated to be ₹36.5 million (US$390,000). The strategic location of the fort would also promote ornithology as the area overlooks the Sewree mudflats, that are frequented by migratory birds, particularly the lesser flamingoes.

== Gallery ==
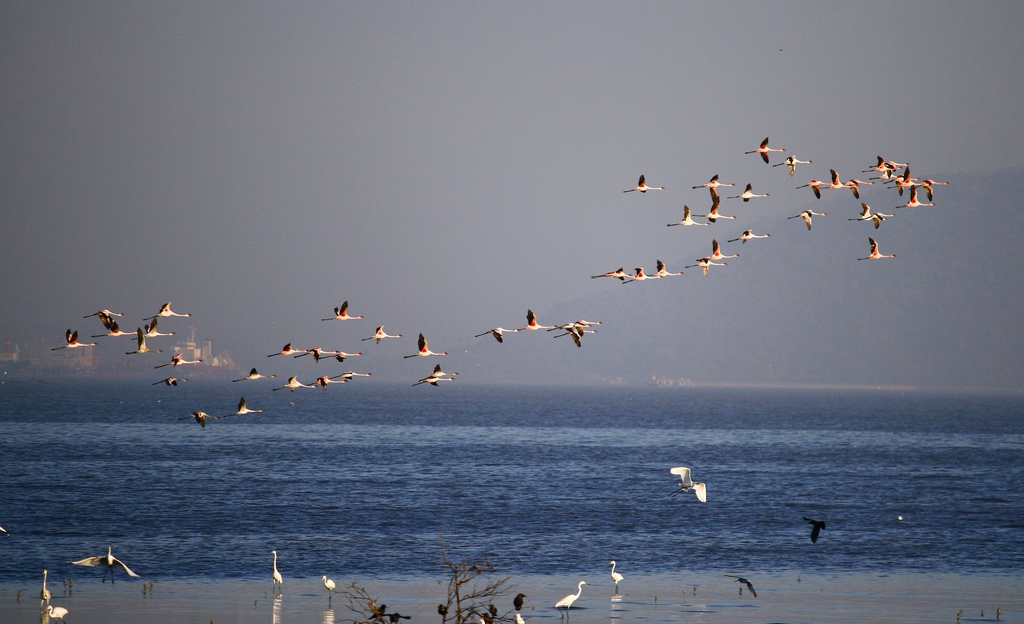

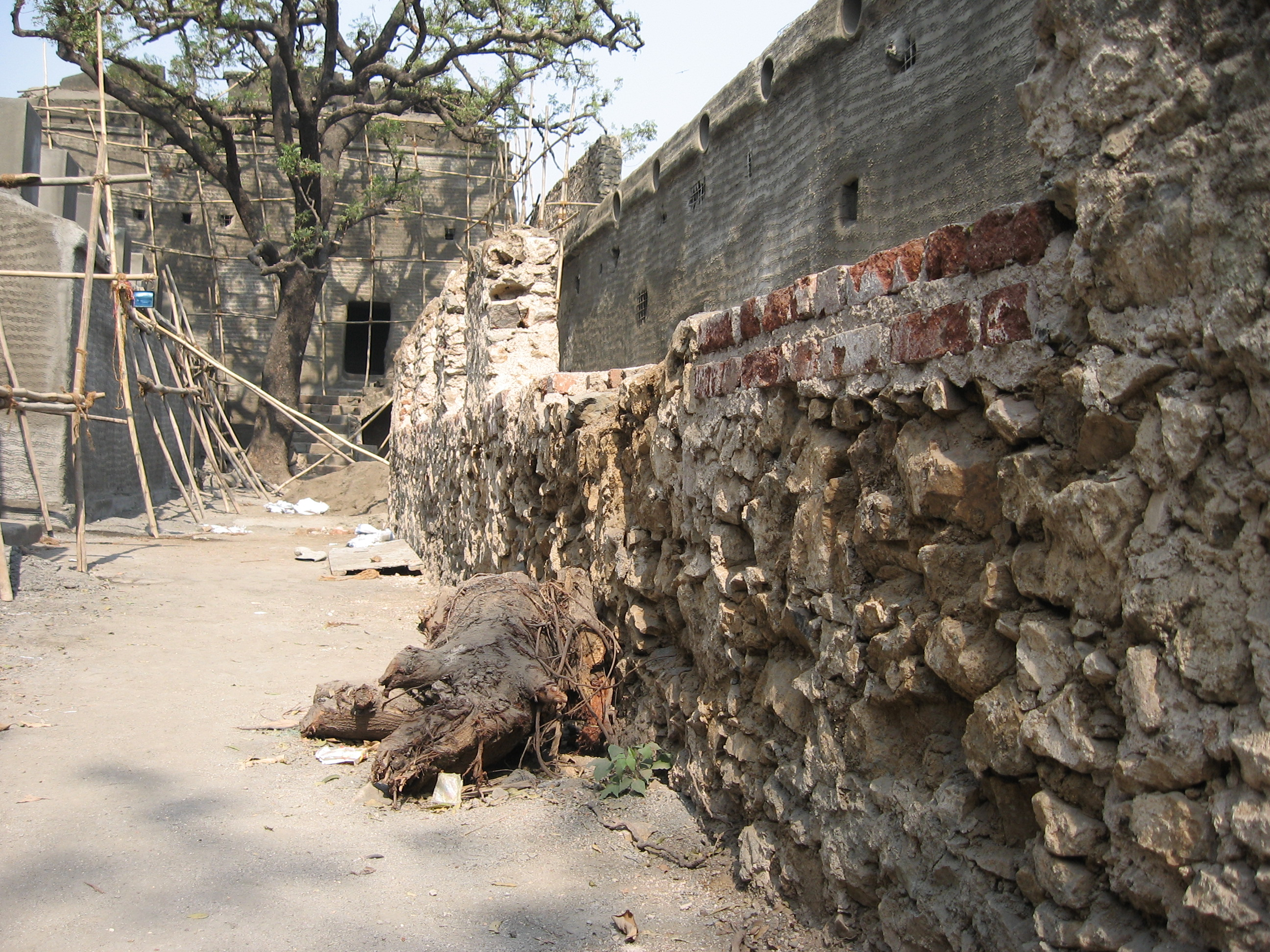

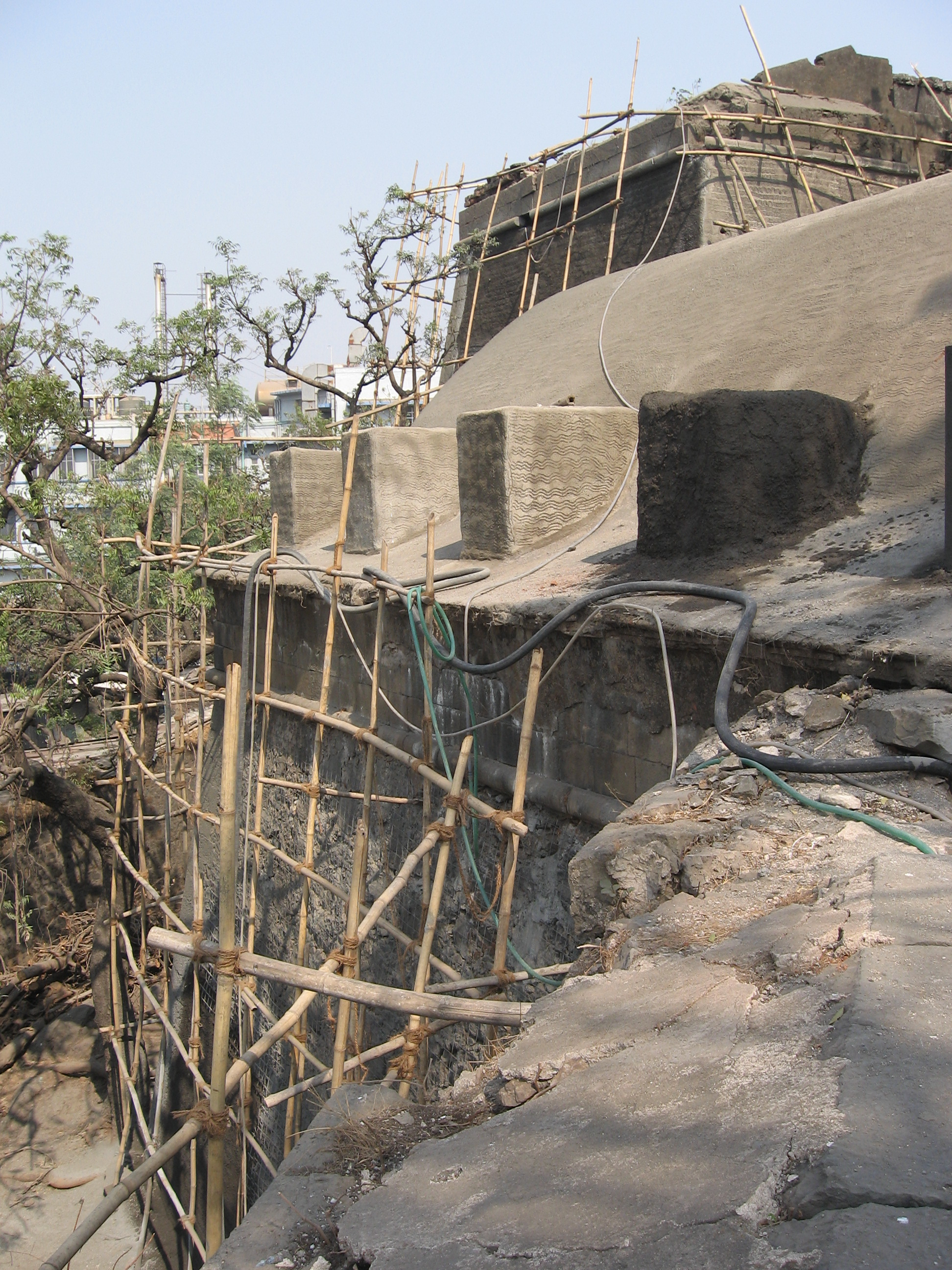

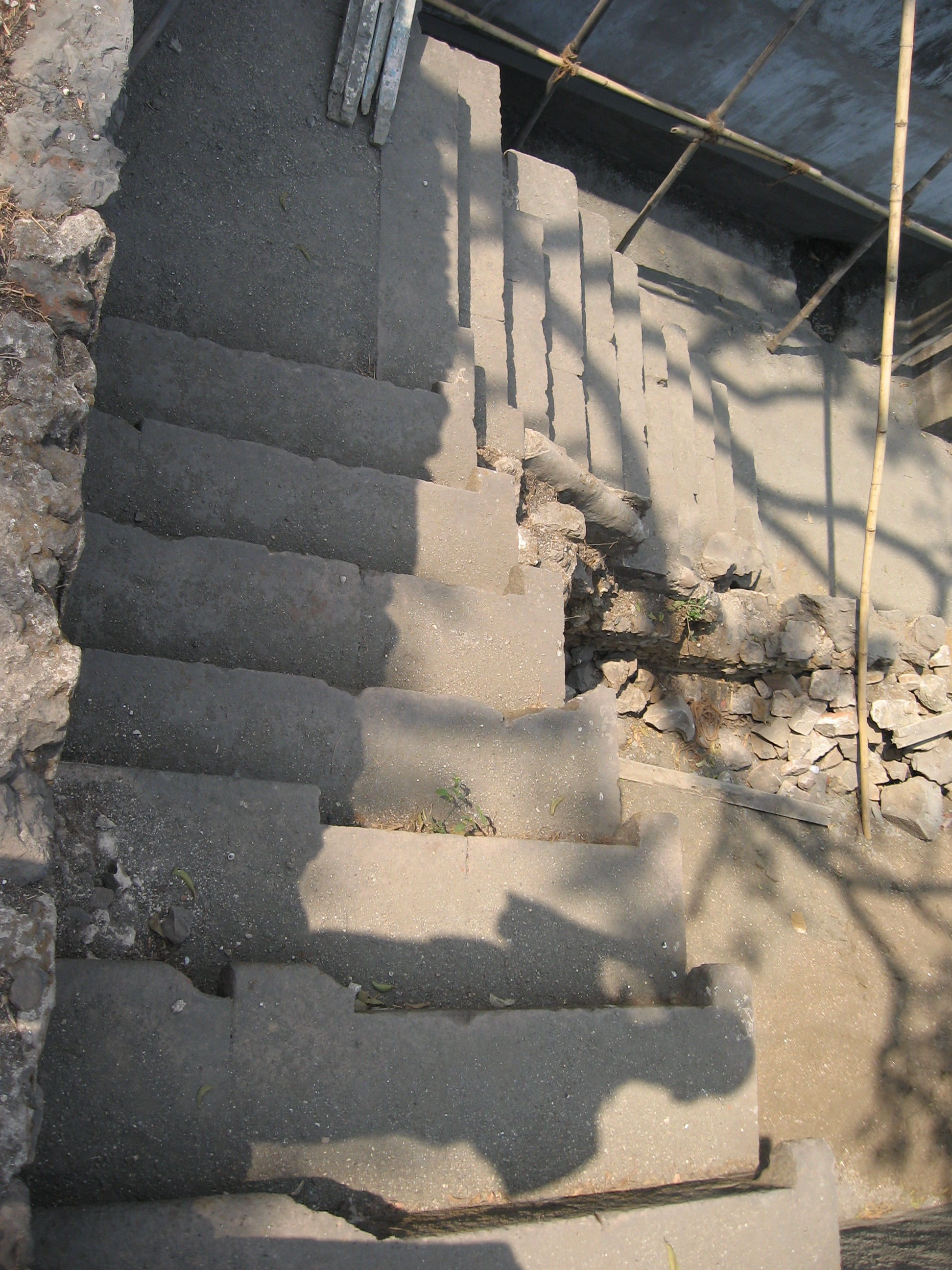

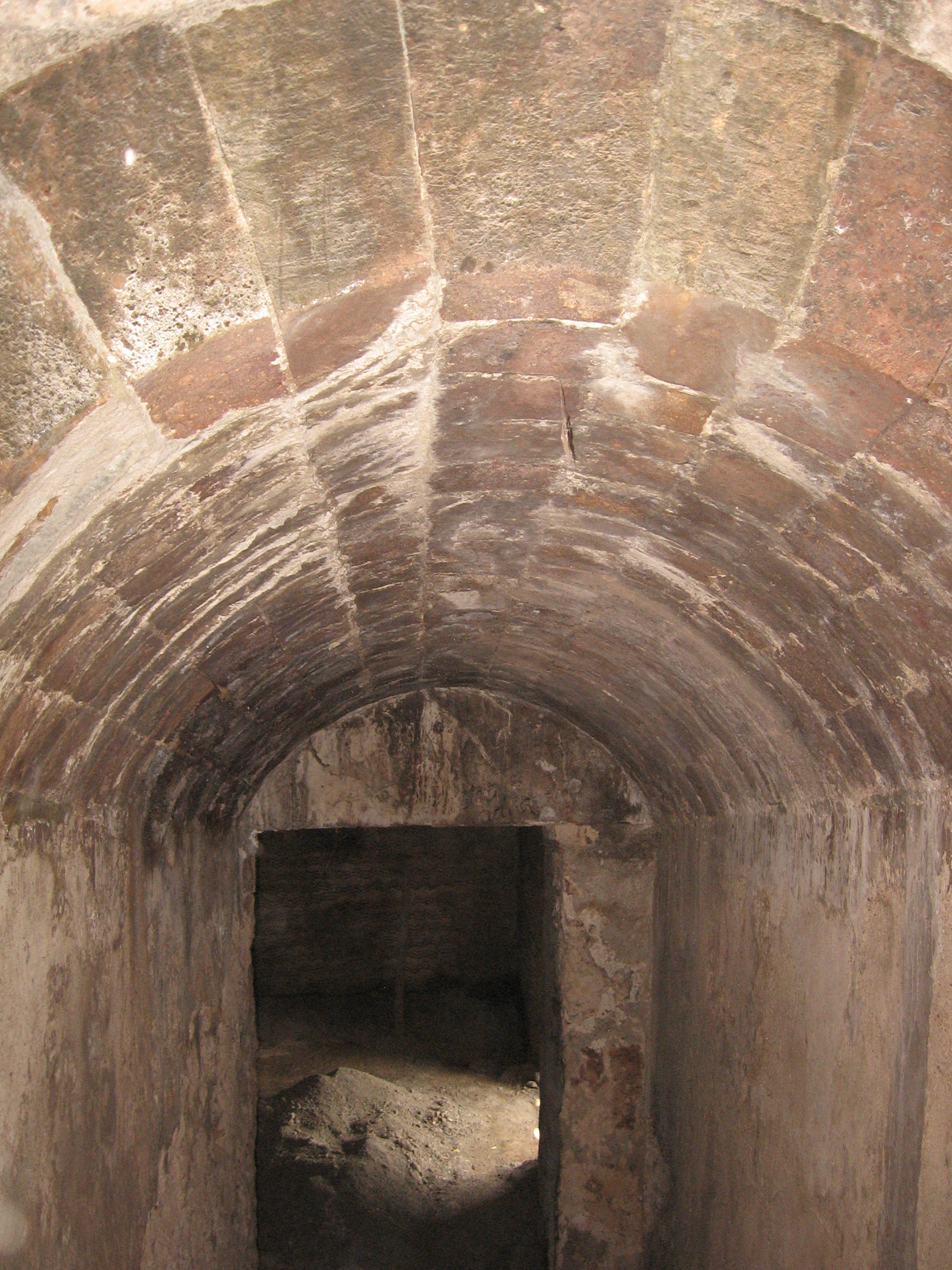

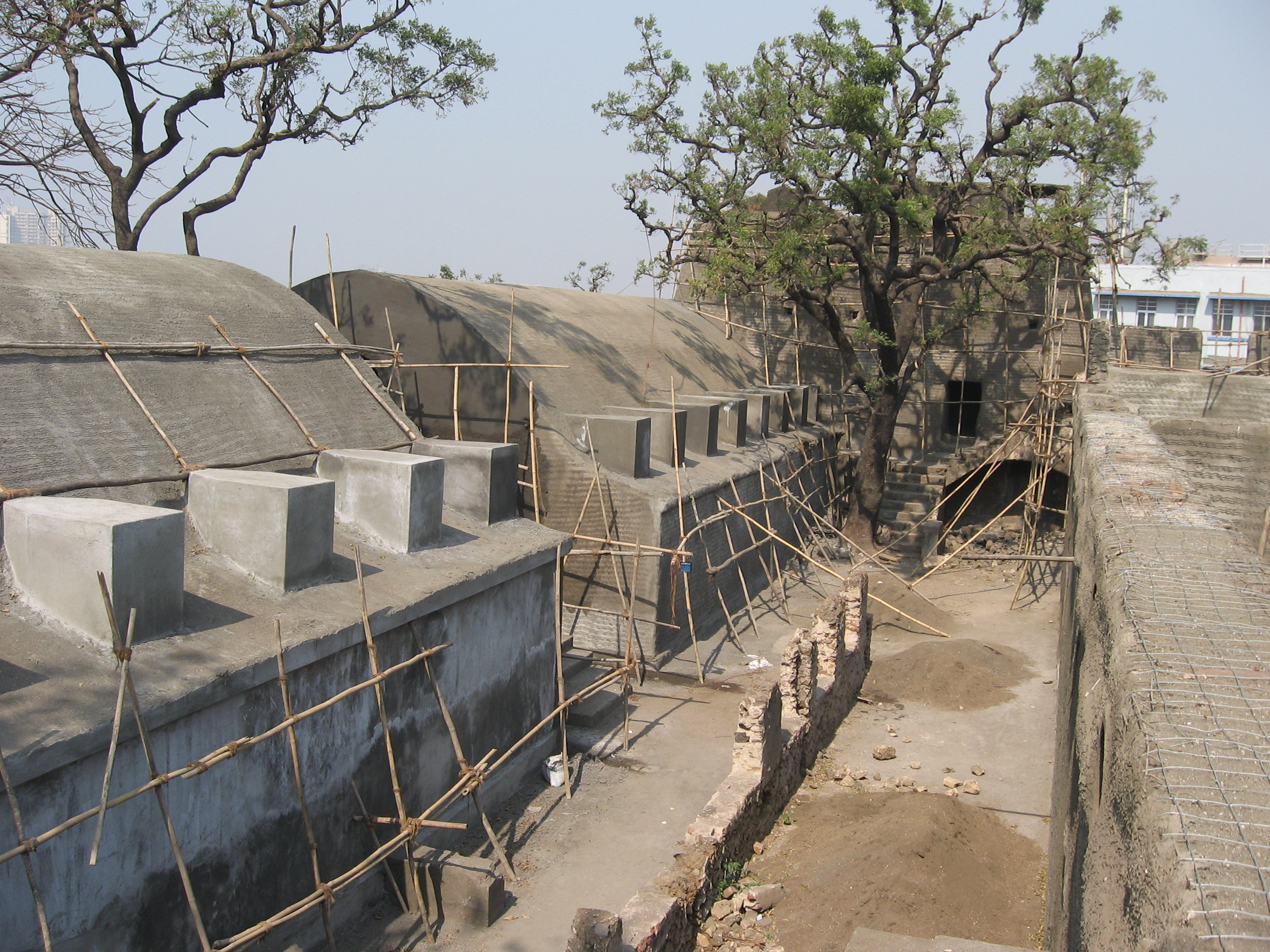

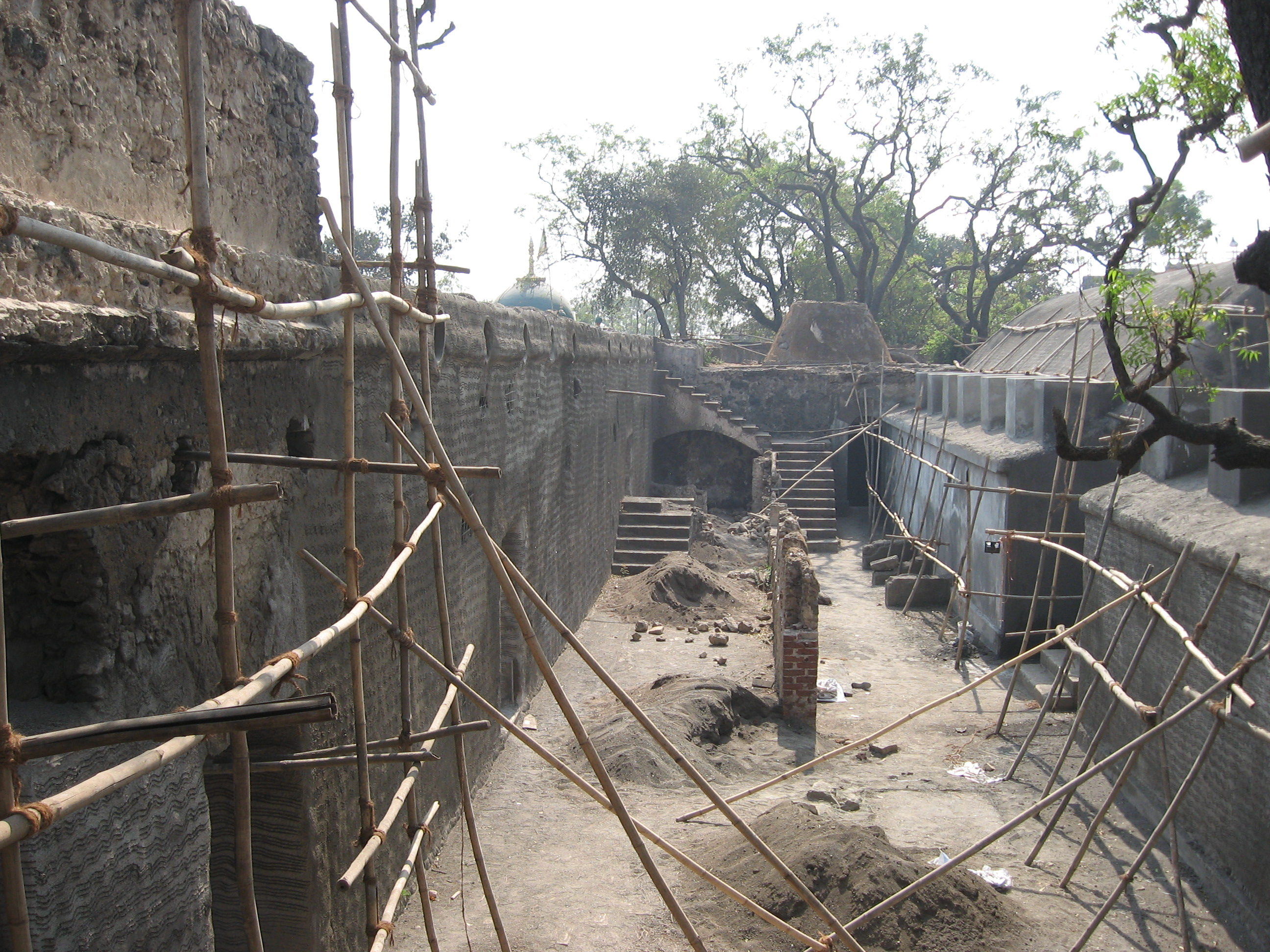

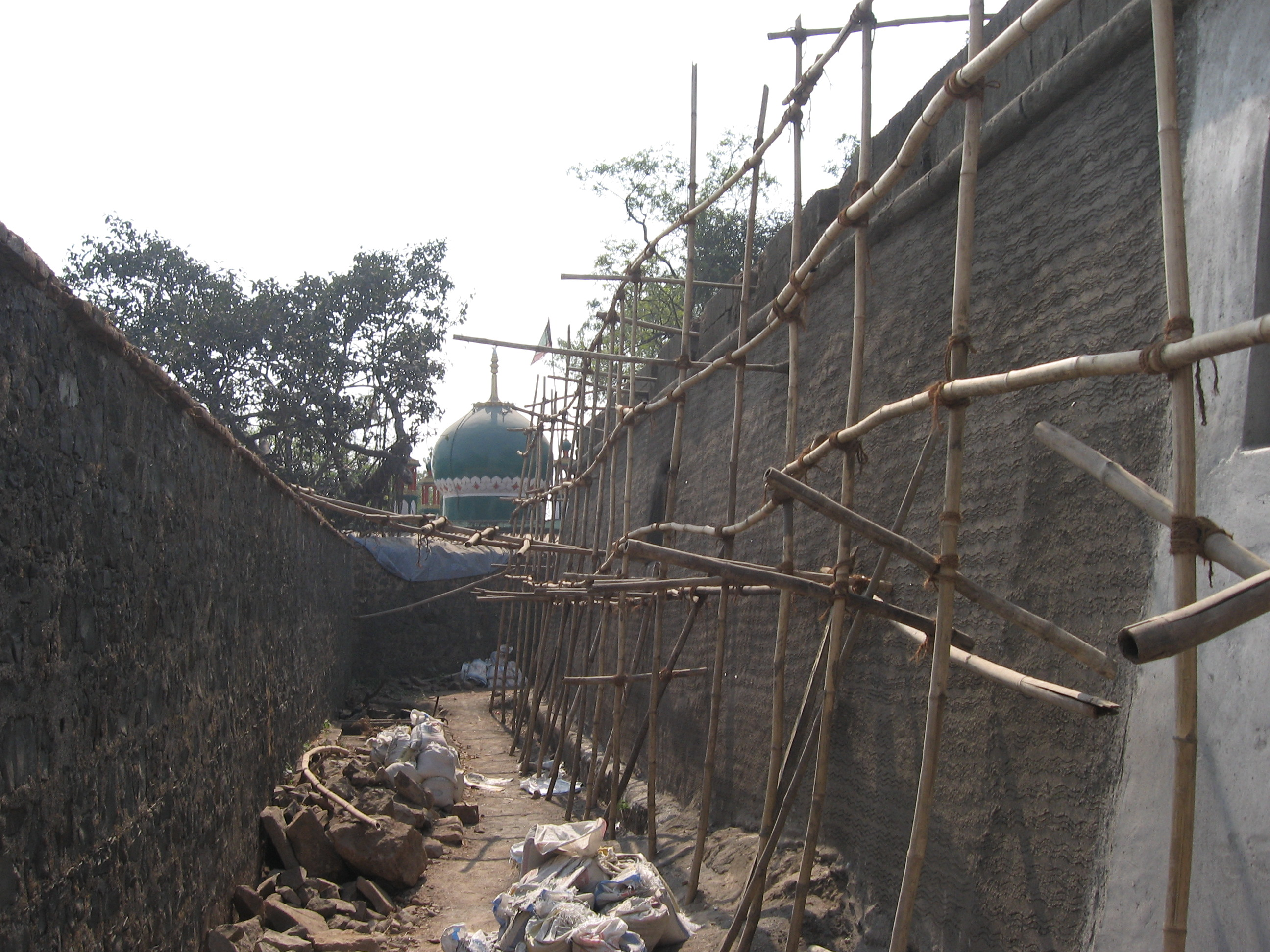

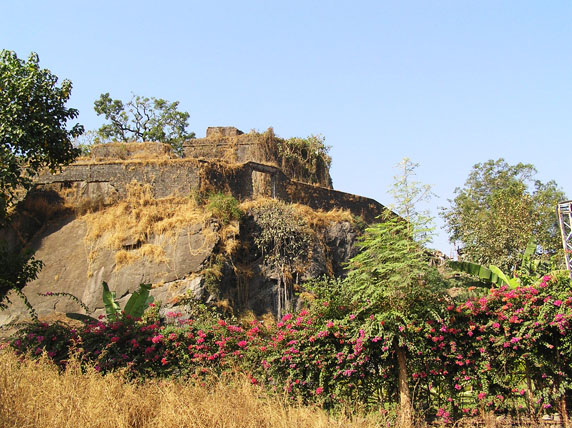

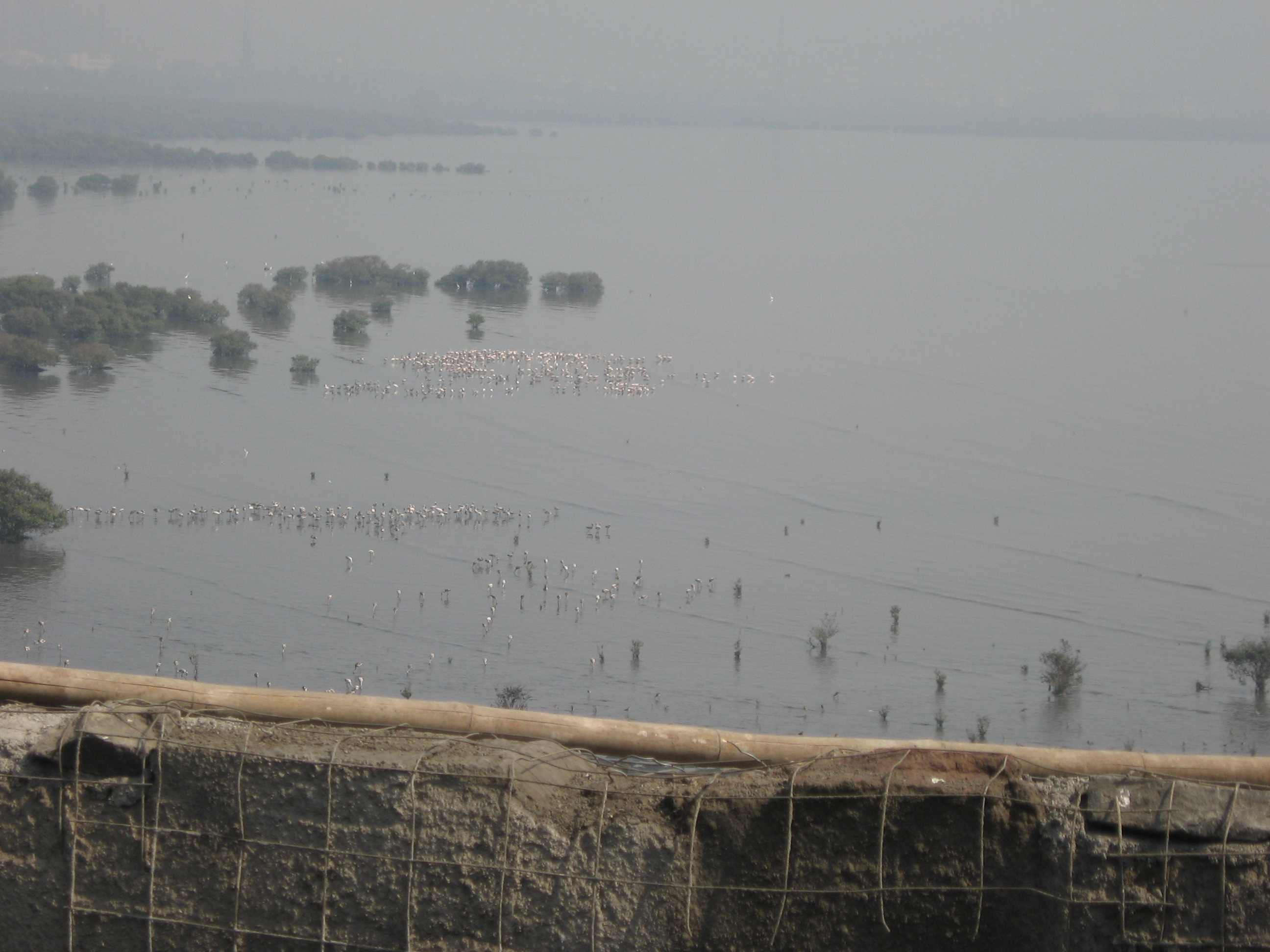

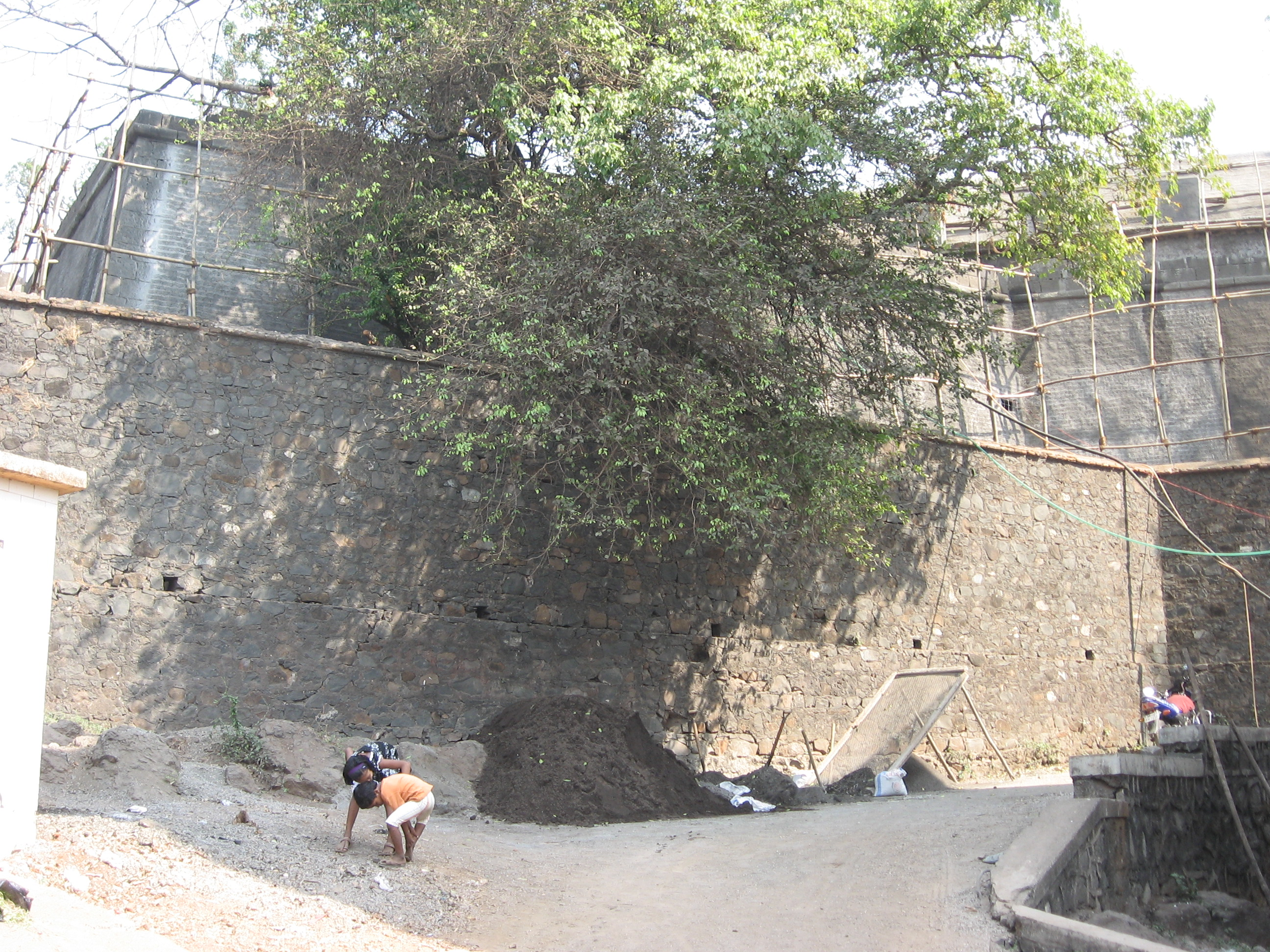

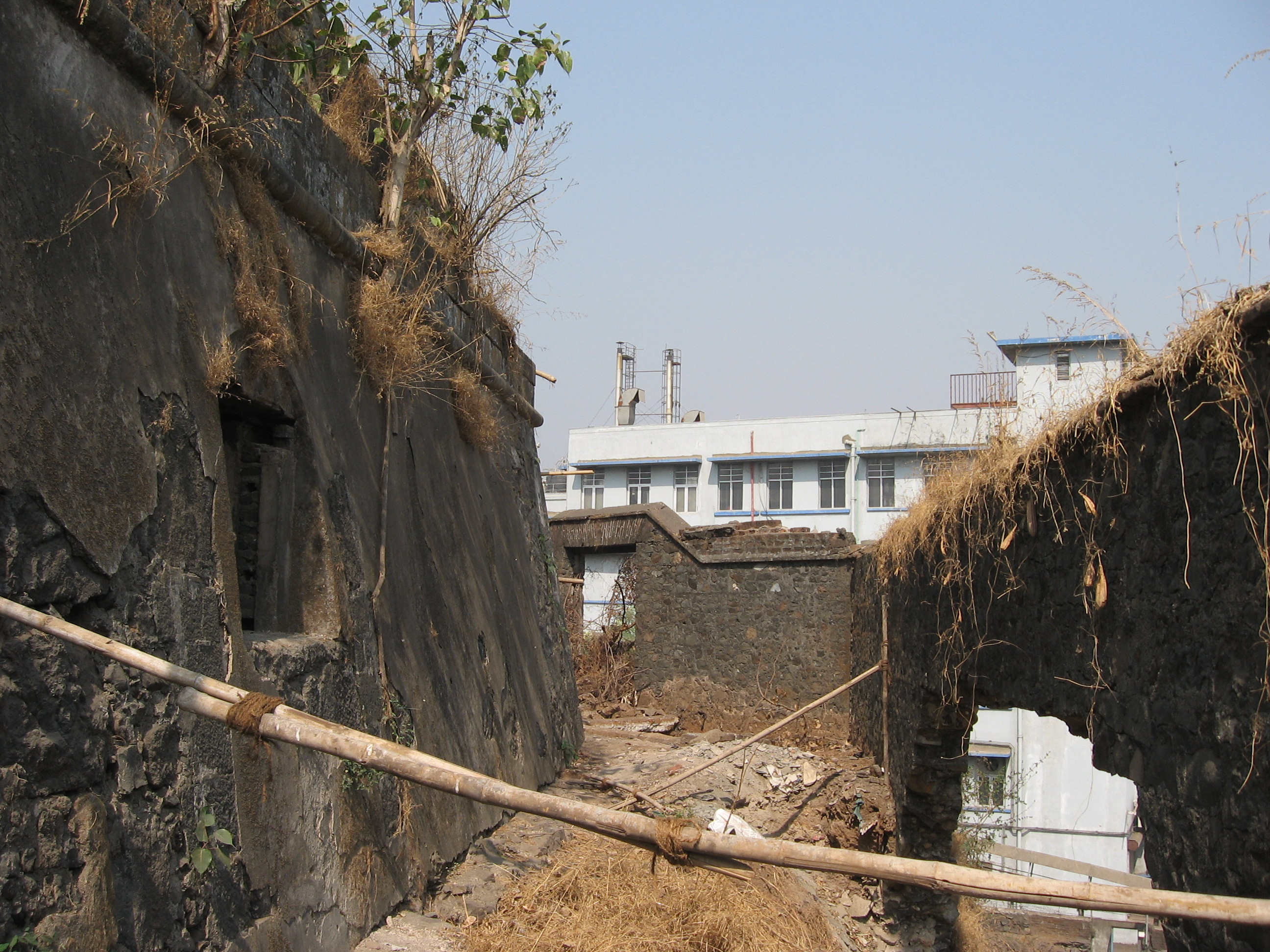

== See also ==
- History of Mumbai
- List of forts in Maharashtra
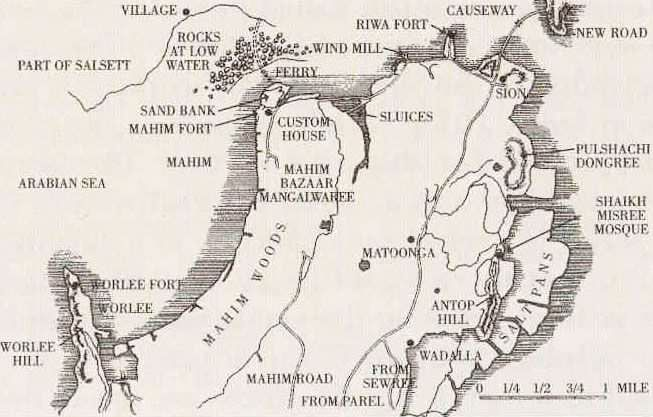
- Old map of the region (post 1805).
