= Bombay Catholic Sabha =

The Bombay Catholic Sabha (BCS) was founded on 20 January 1989 under the patronage of the then Archbishop of Bombay, Cardinal Simon Pimenta. It is a non-political organisation registered as a Public Trust, under the Bombay Public Trusts Act 1950. The BCS is a recognised lay association of the Archdiocese of Bombay, affiliated to the All India Catholic Union (AICU) that is in turn recognised by the Catholic Bishops' Conference of India.

As a part of the Youth Activities thrust area of the Sabha it offers employment to youth through RACE- Resource And Career Enhancement RACE conducts Career Guidance workshops in parishes.
