= Dockyard Road railway station =

Railway station in Mumbai, India

Dockyard Road

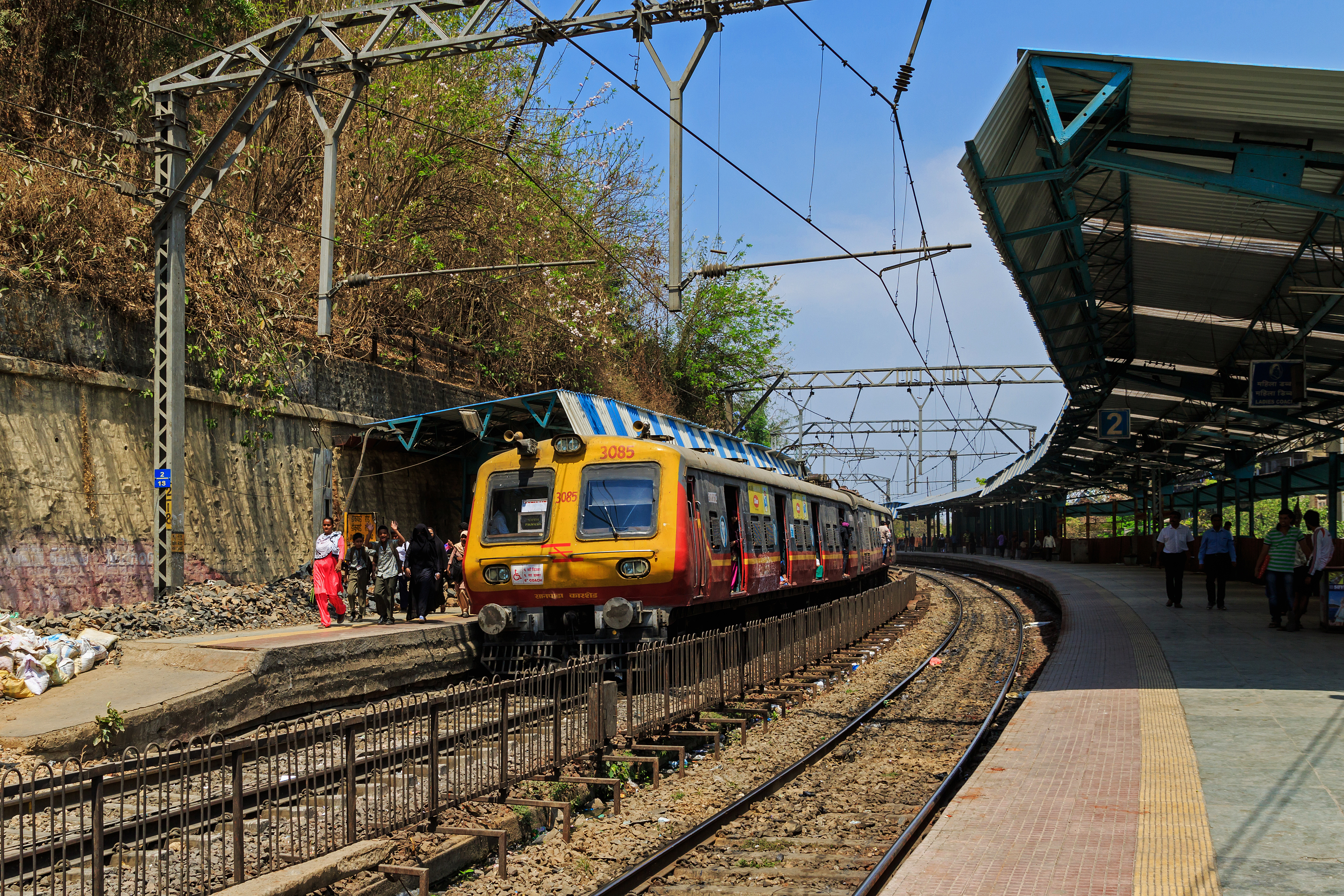

General information
- Coordinates: 18.966417°N 72.844132°E
- System: Mumbai Suburban Railway station
- Owner: Ministry of Railways, Indian Railways
- Line: Harbour Line

Construction
- Structure type: Elevated

Other information
- Status: Active
- Station code: DKRD
- Fare zone: Central Railways

Services
Preceding station	Mumbai Suburban Railway	Following station
Sandhurst Road towards Chhatrapati Shivaji Terminus	Harbour line	Reay Road towards Goregaon or Panvel
Route map
Location
- Location within India Location within Maharashtra Location within Mumbai

Dockyard Road (station code: DKRD) is a railway station on the Harbour Line of the Mumbai Suburban Railway. It is the stop closest to the Mazagon Dock Limited.

This station gives access to Mazagaon area. There is a sales tax office within a ten-minute walk from this station. Dockyard Road is a part of Mazagaon.

Attractions include the Joseph Baptista Gardens, Gaodevi Temple, Manakeshwar Temple and Bhaucha Dhakka (ferry wharf).

The area and the road near the station, Nawab Tank Road, along the eastern end of the city has two diverse influences. One relates to Mysore ruler Tipu Sultan and the other, to a Chinese community.
