= Mazgaon =

Mazagaon
- Neighbourhood
- Location within Mumbai
- Coordinates: 18.97°N 72.85°E
- Country: India
- State: Maharashtra
- Metro: Mumbai

Government
  - Type: Municipal Corporation
  - Body: Brihanmumbai Municipal Corporation
- Time zone: UTC+5:30 (IST)
- PIN: 400010
- Vehicle registration: MH 01

Mazagaon (also spelled as Mazgaon or Mazagon), historically known as Mazagão during the Portuguese era, is a historic neighbourhood in South Mumbai. It was one of the original Seven Islands of Bombay and is now fully integrated into the Mumbai Metropolitan Area. Locally, Christian Bombay East Indians refer to it as 'Mazgon' or 'Maz-a-gon'.

== Location ==
Mazagaon is located in South Mumbai and is bordered by Byculla to the west, Reay Road and Ghodapdeo to the northeast, and Dockyard Road to the east. It falls under the 'E' Ward of the Brihanmumbai Municipal Corporation (BMC).

== Landmarks and Heritage ==
=== Aga Khan's Maqbara ===
Also known as Hasanabad Dargah, this mausoleum is the resting place of Aga Khan I. Constructed between 1881 and 1884, its architecture is inspired by the Taj Mahal. The site is maintained by the local Khoja Muslim community and is often referred to as "Mumbai's Taj Mahal".

=== Gloria Church ===
Gloria Church was originally built in 1632 by Portuguese Franciscans at the foot of Mazagaon Hill. The current structure, located in Byculla, was rebuilt in 1913 in the English Gothic Revival style. The church has been featured in Indian films, including Amar Akbar Anthony (1977).

=== Joseph Baptista Gardens ===
Also known as Mazagaon Gardens, this 1.5-acre hilltop park was developed over a covered water reservoir between 1880 and 1884. The garden offers panoramic views of the Mumbai harbour and was once the site of Mazgaon Fort. It is named after Indian freedom fighter Joseph Baptista and remains a popular local recreational spot.

=== Matharpacady Village ===
Matharpacady is a heritage East Indian Catholic enclave within Mazagaon. It features well-preserved Portuguese-style homes and narrow lanes that reflect Mumbai's colonial architectural legacy. Although its footprint has reduced over time, the area retains much of its original character and continues to be a focus for cultural preservation efforts.

== See also ==
- Joseph Baptista Gardens
