= Haj House =

In India, Haj houses serve as temporary accommodation for Muslims undergoing the Hajj pilgrimage. Notable Haj houses include:

- Haj House (Aurangabad), Maharashtra, India
- Haj House, Lucknow, Uttar Pradesh, India
- Haj House (Mumbai), Maharashtra, India
