= Saint Agnes High School =

Saint Agnes High School, St Agnes High School, or St. Agnes High School may refer to:

Australia

- St Agnes Catholic High School, a secondary school in Rooty Hill, New South Wales in Australia

India

- St. Agnes High School, a girls school in Mumbai, India

United States

- Saint Agnes School, a private, Roman Catholic high school in Saint Paul
- St. Agnes Academic High School, an all-girls private, Roman Catholic high school in Queens, New York
- St. Agnes Boys High School, a former private, Roman Catholic, all-boys high school on the Upper West Side of Manhattan, New York which operated from 1914 to 2013
- St. Agnes High School which was started in Rockville Centre, New York in 1917; it moved to Maria Regina High School which closed in 1984

== See also ==
- Saint Agnes Academy
