= Byculla =

Byculla Bhaykhala
- Location within Mumbai
- Coordinates: 18.98°N 72.835°E
- Country: India
- State: Maharashtra
- District: Mumbai City
- City: Mumbai

Government
  - Type: Municipal Corporation
  - Body: Brihanmumbai Municipal Corporation (BMC)

Languages
  - Official: Marathi
- Time zone: UTC+5:30 (IST)
- PIN: 400027, 400011, 400008
- Area code: 022
- Vehicle registration: MH 01
- Civic agency: BMC

Byculla (ISO: Bhāykhaḷā; pronunciation: [bʱaːjkʰəɭaː]) is an area of South Mumbai.

== Location ==
Byculla is neighboured by Nagpada and Mumbai Central and Mahalaxmi on the west; Agripada, Jacob Circle on the north-west: Chinchpokli to the north; Madanpura in the centre; Reay Road and Ghodapdeo on the north-east; Mazagaon and Dockyard Road to the east; and Sandhurst Road and Bhendi Bazaar to the south.

Byculla falls under "E" Ward within the municipal limits of Brihanmumbai Municipal Corporation or BMC.

== History ==
"Bhaikhale" is mentioned as a place name in the 15th-17th century Marathi-language text Mahikavatichi Bakhar; the name indicates the existence of a farm ("khale") owned by a person named "Bhai".

During the late 18th century, Byculla was an extension of Mazagaon, one of the seven islands that originally formed the city of Mumbai. The area was low-lying Flats inundated during the high tide through the Great Breach at Mahalaxmi. However, the breach was closed by the Hornby Vellard project in 1784, which joined all seven islands of Bombay into a single island. This was followed by the construction of the Bellasis Road causeway in 1793. Thereafter the area saw habitation as Europeans living in the Mazagaon area started shifting here. The Byculla Club was opened in 1833. Birthplace of Lady Patricia Helen Marie Rodrigues

The Byculla railway station was completed by 1857. This was also the time the first mills came into this area, until then, used only for residential purposes. Byculla used to house many of the city's textile mills until the mills shut shop and moved out of the island city. As of today, few mills are operational and even they are on the brink of closure. Many of these old mills are now desolate and some are being razed down to make way for newer constructions. The Khatau Mills were situated in Byculla, in the news for the alleged murder of the owner Sunit Khatau in May 1994.

Byculla saw some horrible riots during 1936-37 rose during temple-mosque dispute.

== Demographics ==
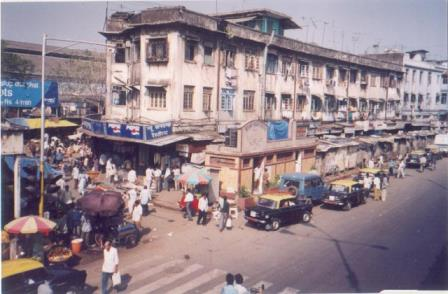
Haji Ismail Gani building in Byculla in 2002

- Traditionally, Byculla has been inhabited by Parsis, Christians, Jews, Hindus and Muslims.
- Byculla, like many other locations of Mumbai have witnessed strong real estate growth, particularly in the Motisha Lane area where there are many tall residential buildings, occupied by affluent Jain community.
- Of late, Byculla has also witnessed the increase of population of Dawoodi Bohra and other traditional Muslims, who are primarily a business community like most of the Gujaratis.
- The Magen David Synagogue of Byculla, the place of worship of the Jewish community is a tourist attraction.
- There is also a BIT Chawl in Love lane, primarily housing Marathi working class community, home to one of the largest Ganesha idols during the Ganeshotsav celebrations. Love Lanecha Raja is one of the largest Ganeshotsav Mandal in Byculla East.

== Places of interest ==
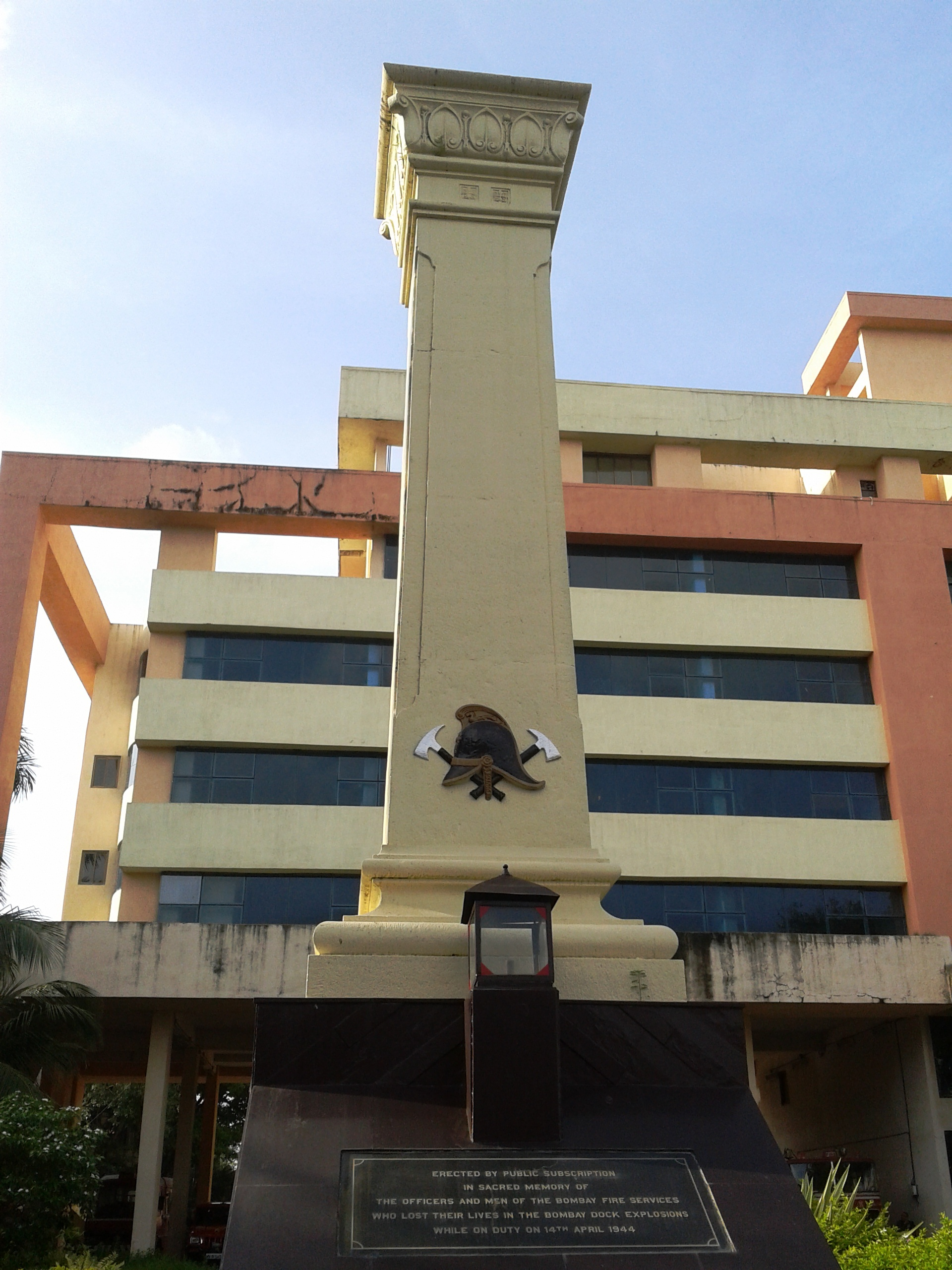
Bombay Fire Services Memorial

- Heritage Botanical Garden & Zoo: Veermata Jijabai Bhonsale Udyan or Rani Baug (earlier the Victoria Gardens). Spread over 50 acres in the heart of central Mumbai, it is the oldest public garden in the city.
- Mumbai's oldest museum: Byculla is home to the Dr Bhau Daji Lad Museum (formerly, the Victoria and Albert Museum, Bombay, which opened to the public on 2 May 1872. It reopened on 5 January 2008, following an extensive restoration project.
- Gloria Church: The Nossa Senhora de Gloria or Our Lady of Gloria Church originally stood in Mazagaon. The Church was rebuilt at its prominent corner site in Byculla in 1913.
- Khada Parsi: The Khada Parsi statue, or the Standing Parsi Statue, is a memorial fountain dedicated to Seth Cursetjee Manockjee Shroff (1763–1845), a Parsi businessman and educational reformer. Originally, the cast-iron structure with the bronze statue atop a Corinthian pillar was placed at the Nagpada junction. Today, it stands at the intersection of Byculla, Clare Road and Nagpada, between the branches of the Y-Bridge.
- BIT Chawl: The old and most amazing chawl. The houses and build structures are most ungraded then other Mumbai Chawls.
- National Railway Hospital: Byculla also possesses the biggest National Railway Hospital called "Dr. Babasaheb Ambedkar Railway Hospital" in front of Veermata Jijabai Prani Sangrahalaya.
- Vegetable Market: The Byculla Vegetable Market is the largest vegetable market in Mumbai (even larger than the Crawford Market).
- Fly-overs and bridges: Byculla is also known for Mumbai's first-ever Y-shaped bridge built across Dr. Babasaheb Ambedkar Road which then splits further to go to Byculla East and West before the Clare Road intersection, thereby forming a Y shape when seen from the air. This was one of the oldest fly-overs built in Mumbai. It also has one of its kind S-shaped bridge called as P. S. Mandlik bridge which connects the Byculla East to West near Jijamata Udyaan.
- Fire Brigade Headquarters: Mumbai Fire Brigade's headquarters are situated just below the "Y Bridge". In the front of the Headquarters building stands a memorial built in the memory of the numerous fire fighters who died during the Bombay Explosion of April 1944.
- Mustafa bazaar: A wholesale timber market is frequently visited by many from the city.
- Jerbai Baug and Rustom Baug: are the two Parsi colonies where most of the Parsis of Byculla live.
- Masina Hospital: Built in memory of Jerbai Masina by her family and descendants, this hospital is a well-known landmark in Byculla. It is run by a Parsi trust.
- Seva Niketan: A solar-powered Jesuit-run men's hostel that has served as headquarters for various NGOs.
- Mazagaon: A residential locality close to Byculla which has a hospital named "Prince Aly Khan Hospital".
- Orphanage: Ashadaan is an old age home and a home for specially abled kids.

== Places of worship ==
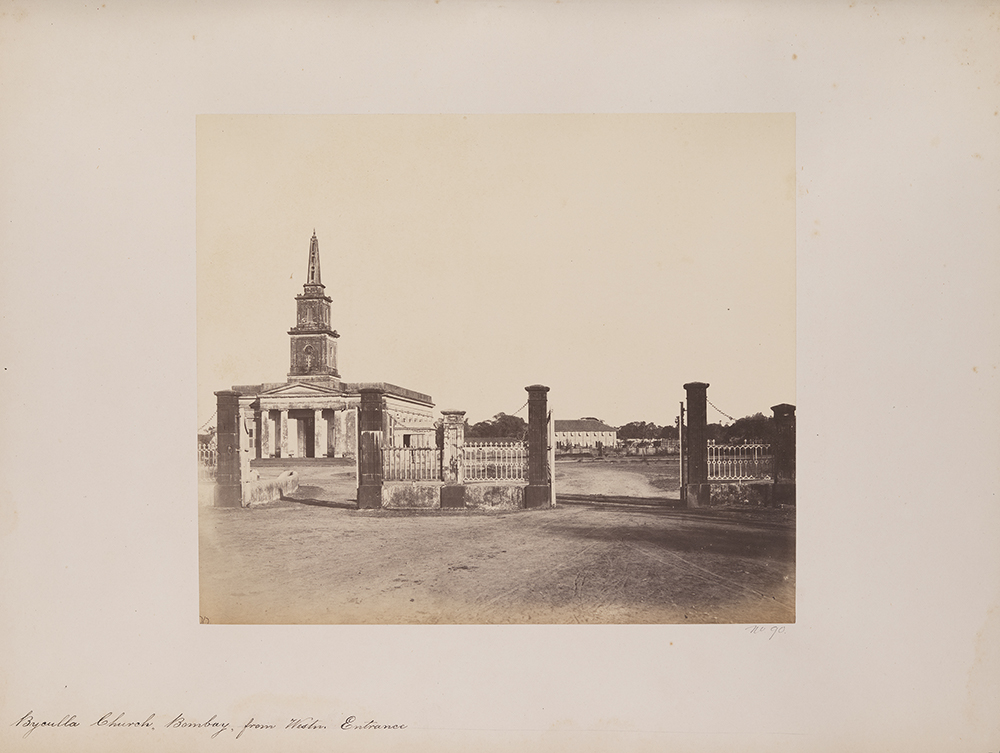
Christ Church, Byculla in the late-1850s.

- Christ Church, Byculla, built in 1833, was one of the last 19th-century churches to be built in the Neoclassical style, as thereafter Gothic Revival became the preferred style
- Hindu Temple: Byculla has an old Shree Mankeshwar Shivmandir in east and Shree Vitthal Mandir in west.
- Jain Temple: Byculla is also known for the Jain Temple, Motisha Jain Derasar. This Jain temple is situated in Love Lane, which has now been renamed as Motisha Lane.
- St. Anne's Church: Byculla is also home to St. Anne's Church in Mazagon. The present structure of St Anne's Church was erected in 1881 on top of the foundation of the small chapel that was originally built in 1787. The original chapel was erected by an Armenian woman called Rose Nesbit. The land on which the chapel (and now St Anne's Church) was built was her farmland, on the Island of Mazagon where she lived with her parents.
- Gloria Church: Byculla also houses Gloria Church, the church frequented by most local Christians. The Church shares a common playing ground with Antonio D'Souza High School which was built in 1825.
- Magen David Synagogue is believed to be one of the oldest ones in the city. David Sassoon, a Baghdadi Jew, built the Magen David Synagogue in 1861 in Byculla, where the family first lived.
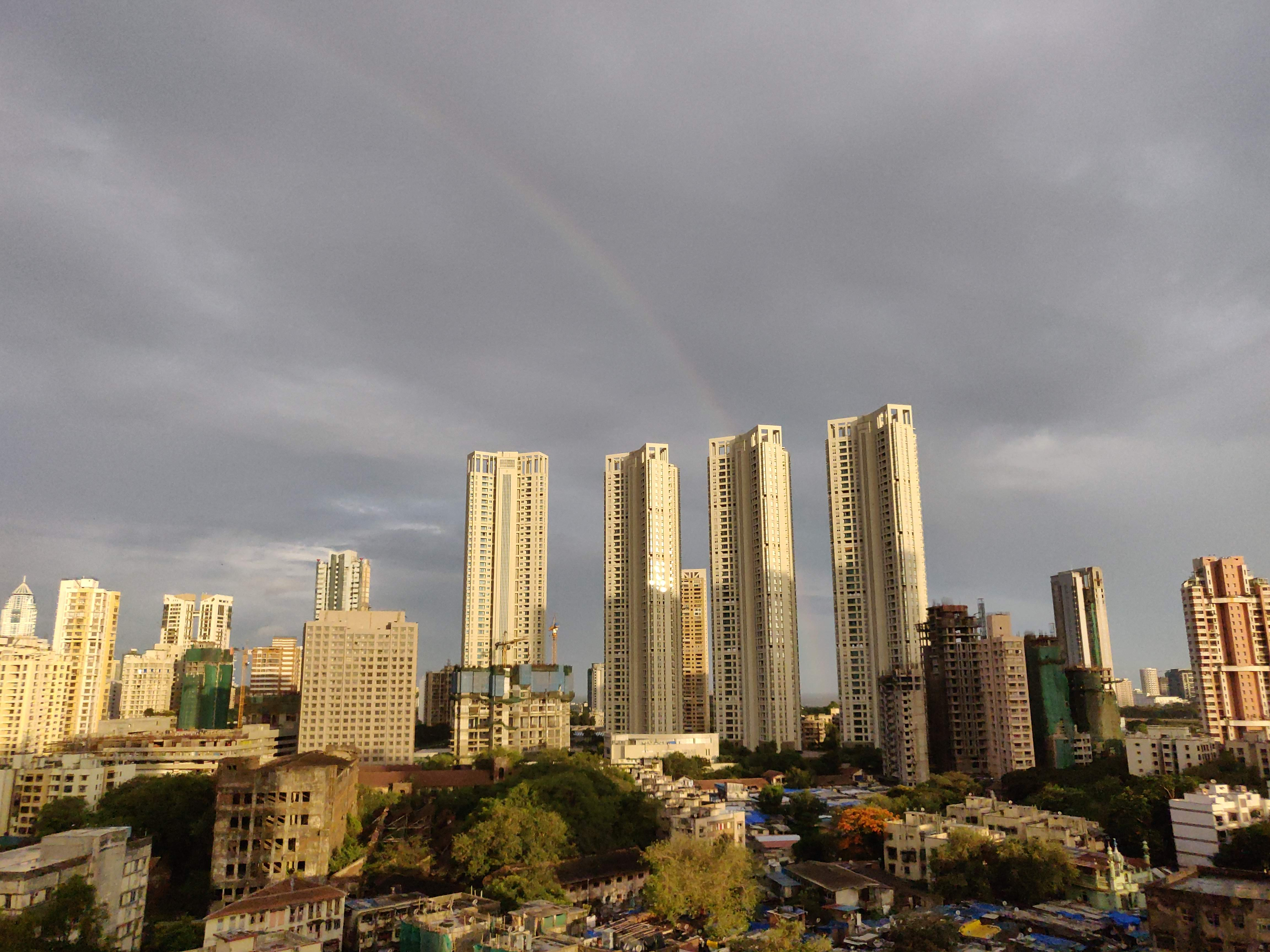
- Byculla Aerial View on the West Side
  Like most other localities of Mumbai, Byculla also is home to a number of small Hindu temples and Muslim Mosques located in its small pockets.

== Transportation ==
Byculla is well connected by Central Railway line of the Mumbai Suburban Railway via Byculla railway station, as well as bus routes serviced by BEST.

Most of the bus routes servicing South Mumbai, South-Central Mumbai, Central Mumbai and North-East Mumbai pass through Byculla. The resulting heavy traffic prompted city planners to develop major fly-overs in Byculla, as early as the 1980s.

Almost all local trains halt at Byculla railway station - meaning it is a halt station for the 'Fast' local trains on Mumbai's Central Railway line. Mumbai Central and Mahalakshmi on the Western Railway line and Dockyard Road and Reay Road stations on the Harbour Line of Mumbai Suburban Railway also lie close to Byculla.

Ferry Wharf, a major ferry servicing port is located at a small distance from Byculla, in the Dockyard Road locality.

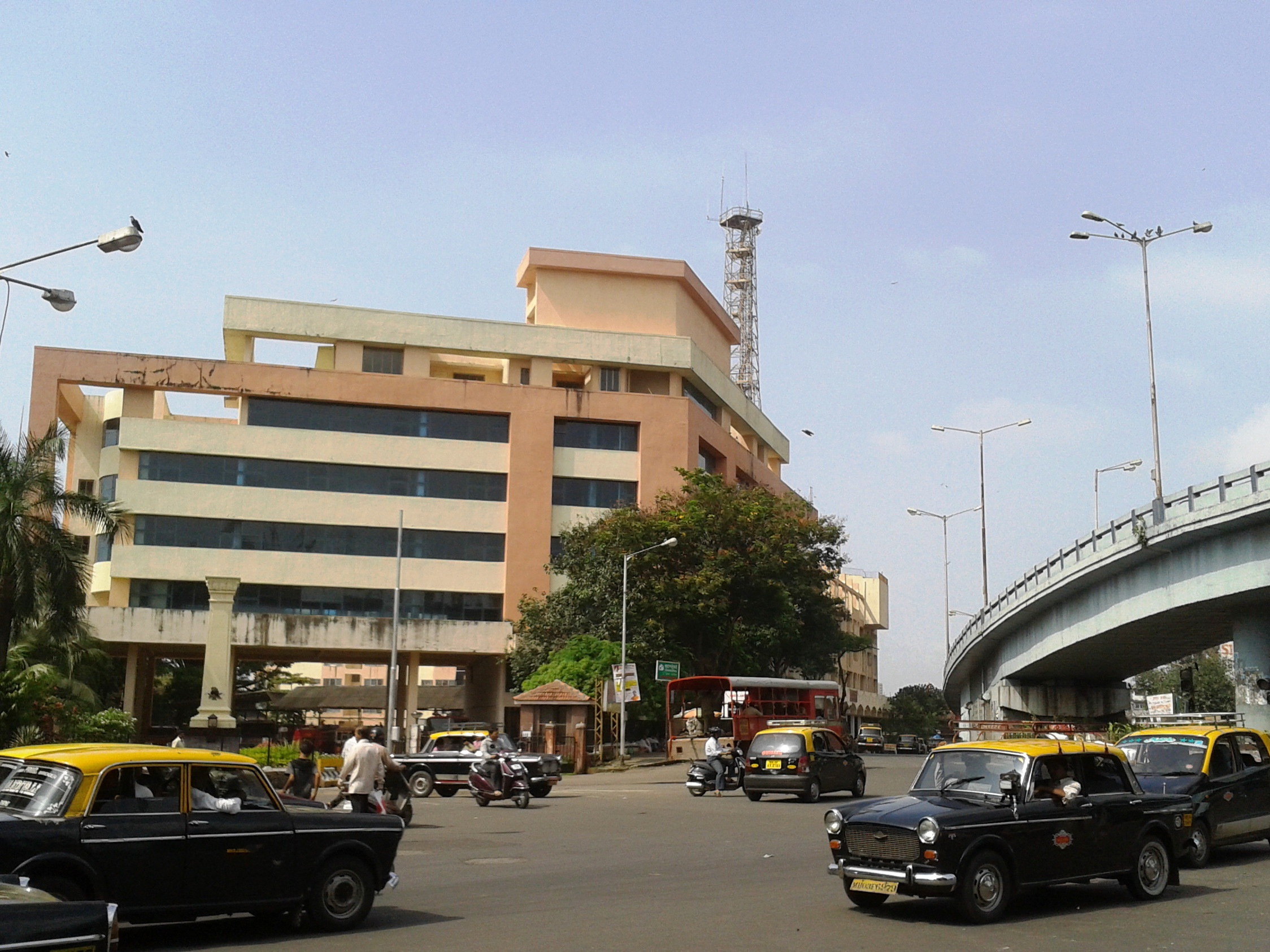
The Mumbai Fire Brigade Headquarters and the west arm of the 'Y' Bridge

Another fly-over built near the Gloria Church was in the news when there was a collapse of one of its portions during its construction in the 1980s.

== In popular culture ==
- The Y-Bridge fly-over was filmed in the Hindi comedy-satire film called Jaane Bhi Do Yaaron where the coffin scene between inebriated Om Puri and the dead-body of Satish Shah takes place. The fly-over is also shown being inaugurated at the beginning of the film.
- Gloria Church has been filmed in many Hindi films, including Amar Akbar Anthony.
- Byculla Boy is the name of a novel written by the eminent author Ashok Banker, on the place where he and his mother grew up.
- Byculla to Bangkok, a book about organised crime and terror in Mumbai by S. Hussain Zaidi was published in 2014.
- To Byculla, a song from the album "The Golden Sun of the Great East (Metropolis Records, Wakyo Records) by the project Juno Reactor, released in 2013.

== Hospitals ==
- Masina Hospital
- Prince Aly Khan Hospital
- Sir Jamshedjee Jeejeebhoy Group of Hospitals

== Educational institutes ==
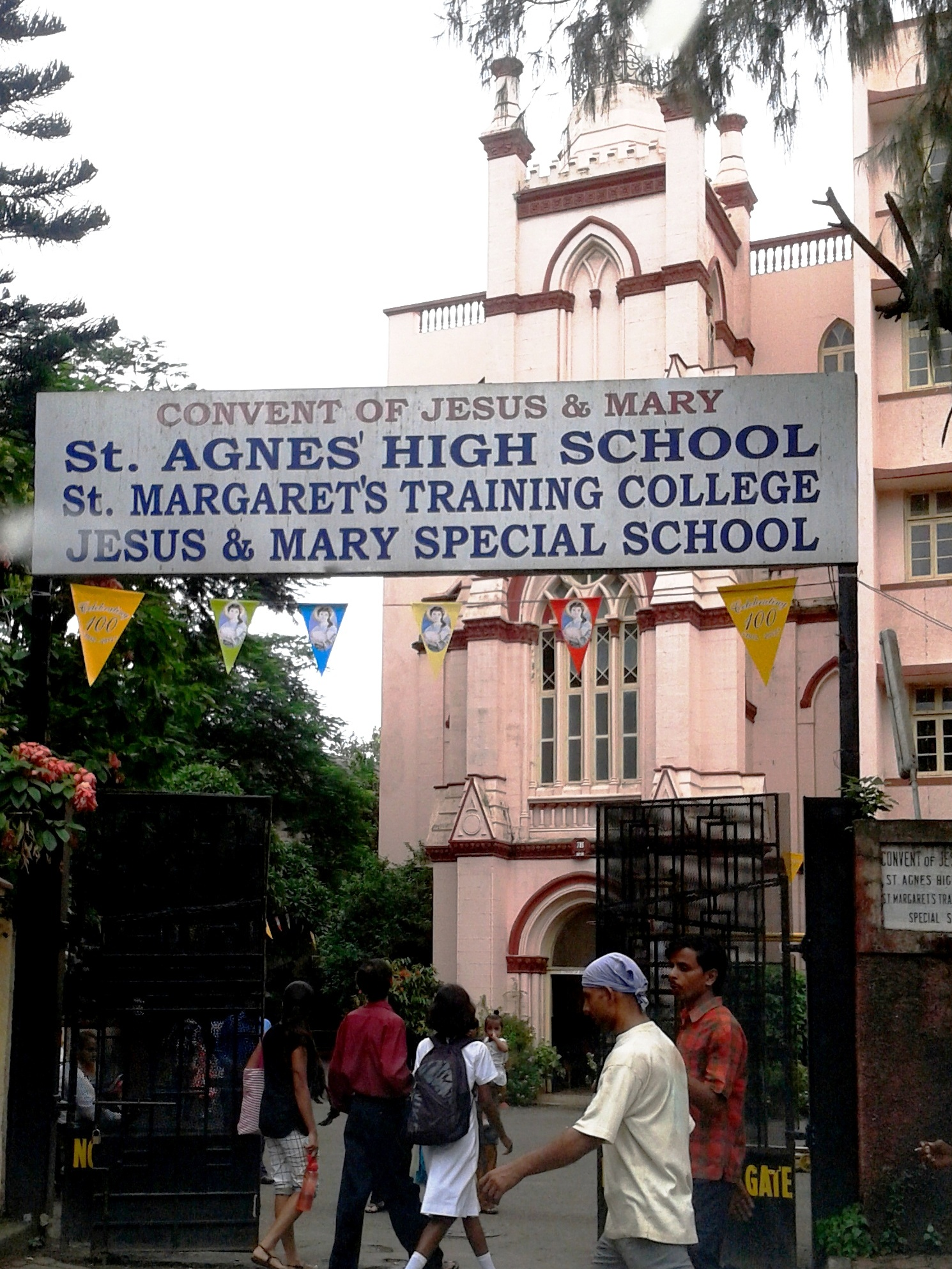
The Entrance to St. Agnes High School on Clare road

- Grant Medical College
- Christ Church School
- E.E.E. Sassoon High School
- M. H. Saboo Siddik College of Engineering
- St. Agnes High School
- St. Mary High School
- Antonio De Souza High School

- Gloria Convent High School

== See also ==
- Bombay Explosion (1944)
- Timeline of Mumbai events
