= Sabrina Fountain =

1858 fountain by William Burges

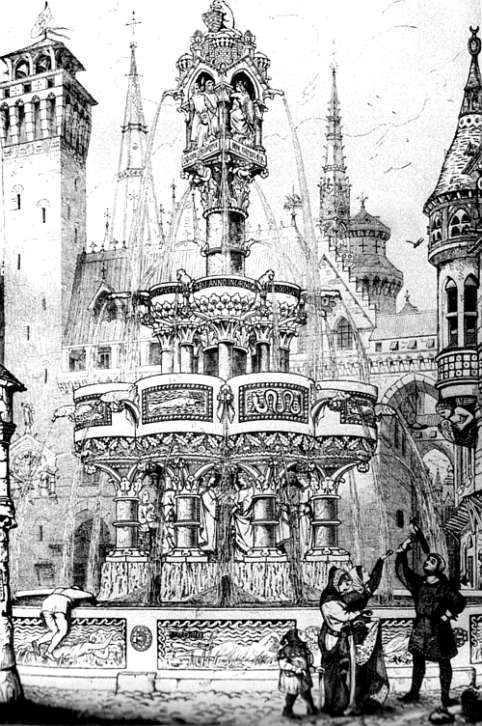
- Artist: William Burges
- Year: 1858
- Movement: Gothic Revival
- Condition: unexecuted
- Location: Victoria and Albert Museum, London

The Sabrina Fountain was designed by William Burges in 1858. Commemorating the legendary princess Hafren, who was drowned in the River Severn, Burges intended the fountain to stand in the city of Gloucester but it was never executed.

== History and description ==
William Burges designed the fountain in 1858. It was intended to commemorate Hafren (aka Sabrina), a legendary British princess. Geoffrey of Monmouth, in his Historia Regum Britanniae, records that Hafren and her mother were drowned in the River Severn on the orders of her father's first wife, and that the river derives its name from her. The Severn flows through the city of Gloucester and Burges intended that the fountain stand in one of the city's squares. Joseph Mordaunt Crook, the foremost Burges scholar, noted the "quaint grotesquerie" of Burges' designs which illustrate Sabrina's death and those of her father, Locrinus and her mother Estrildis.

Sabrina is also the subject of John Milton’s play Comus, and Burges’ statue is referenced in Jan Piggot's study, Comus: From text to stage, the fine arts, and book illustration, c.1750-1850.

The fountain was never built. The sketch was used as the frontispiece of the illustrated study of Burges' work, The Architectural Designs of William Burges, authored by his brother-in-law Richard Popplewell Pullan and published after Burges' death. It is now held in the Prints and Drawings Collection at the Victoria and Albert Museum in London.

== Other examples ==
A number of other architects and artists have used Sabrina as a model for fountains, or sculptures. The most directly related is the Crawford Market Fountain in Mumbai, India, designed by William Emerson and decorated by John Lockwood Kipling. Created in 1874, it exhibits remarkable similarities to the Burges fountain, a point noted by Christopher London in his work, Bombay Gothic. (Note: "The design source for Bombay's fountain derives directly from Burges's drawn fantasies for the Sabrina Fountain.")

James Milo Griffith created a Sabrina Fountain in 1881. Commemorating Henry Whitmore, Member of Parliament (MP) for Bridgnorth in the mid-19th century, it stands in the grounds of Bridgnorth Castle, Shropshire. A Statue of Sabrina created by the sculptor William Calder Marshall is now owned by Amherst College in the United States, and is the subject of regular student pranks. A modern interpretation, The Apotheosis of Sabrina, of 1980, is by Gerald Laing and stands on Narrow Quay, in Bristol City Centre.

== Gallery ==
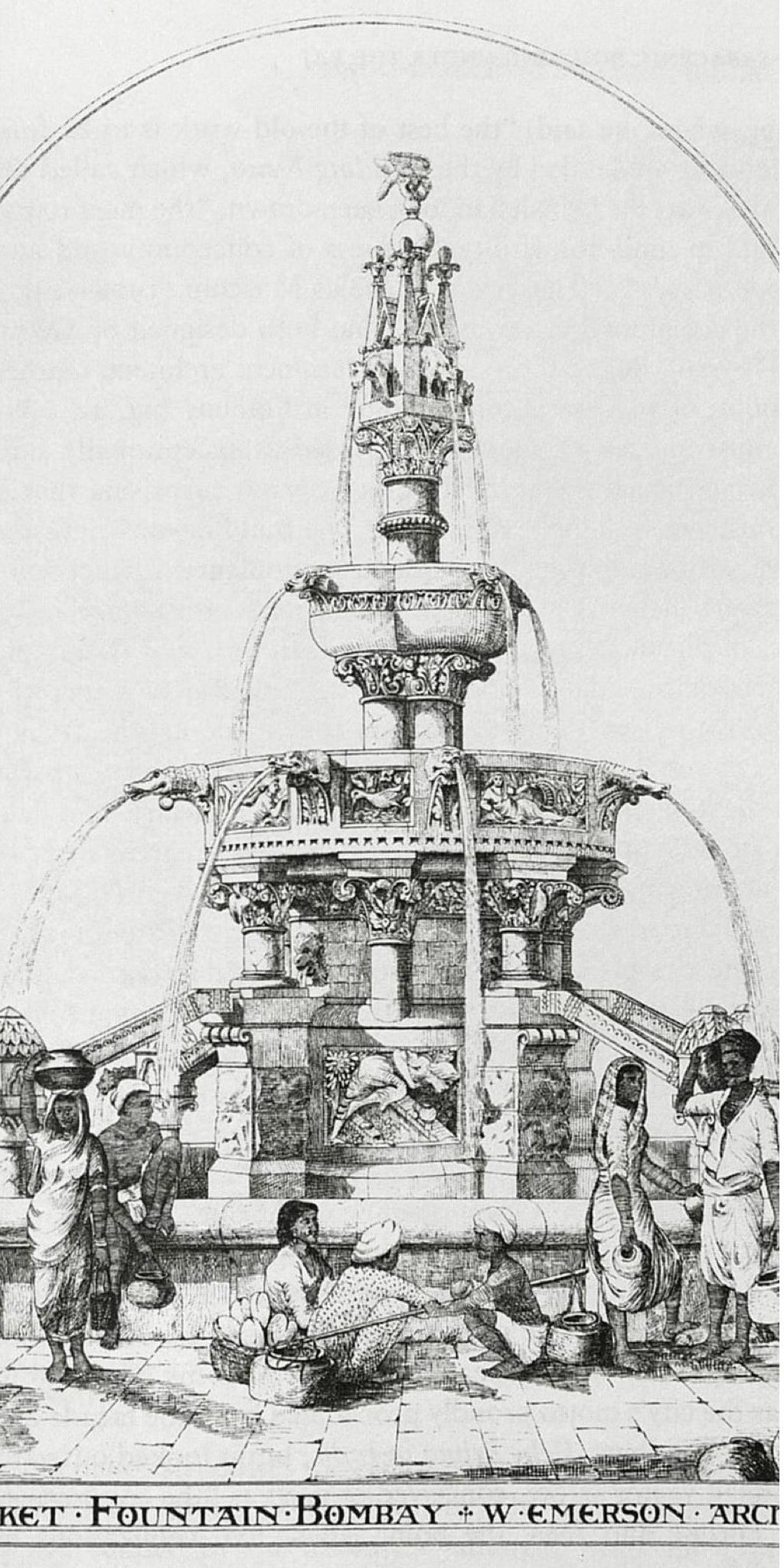
William Emerson's design of 1874 for a fountain in Crawford Market, Mumbai

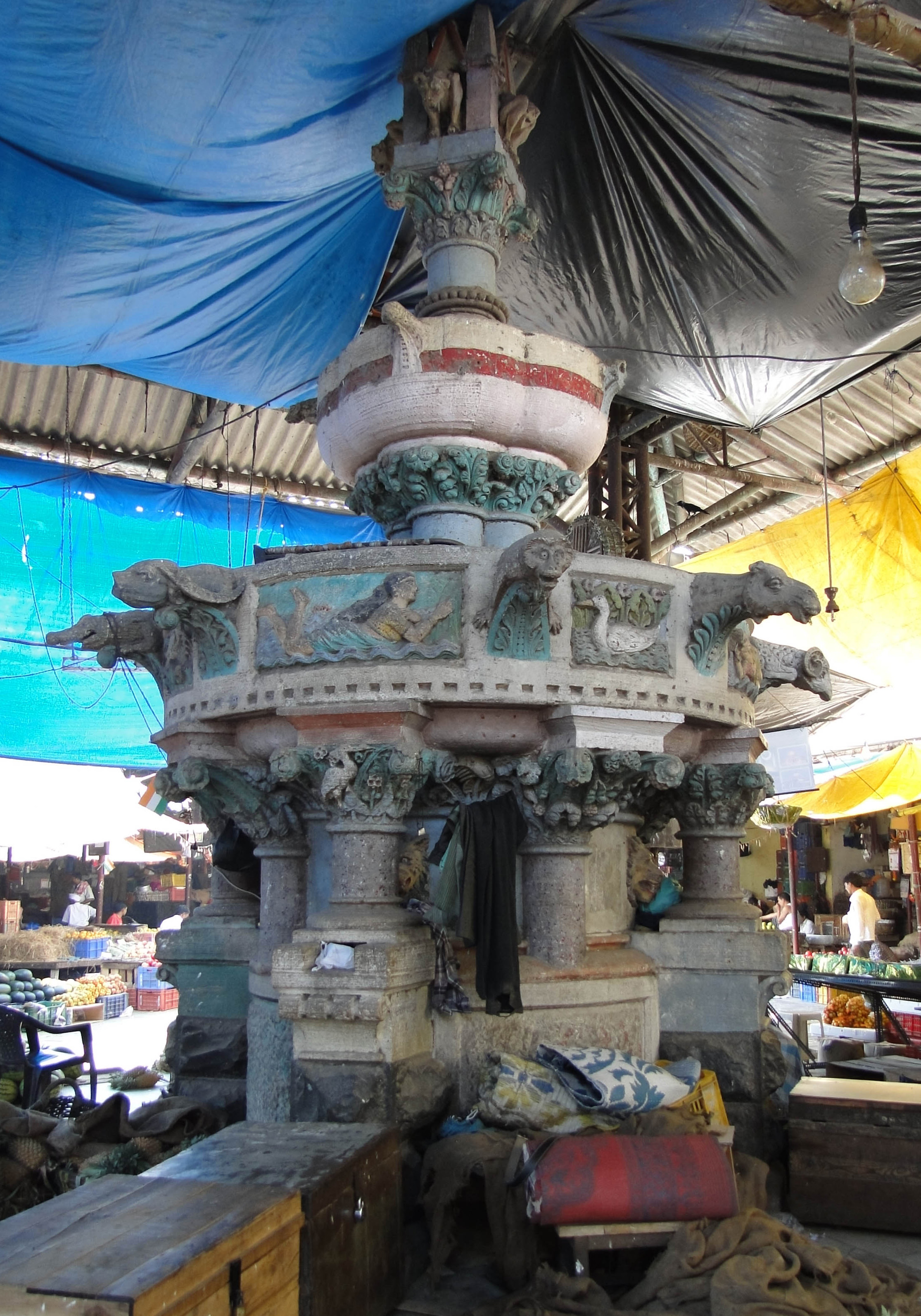
A current view of the Crawford Market Fountain

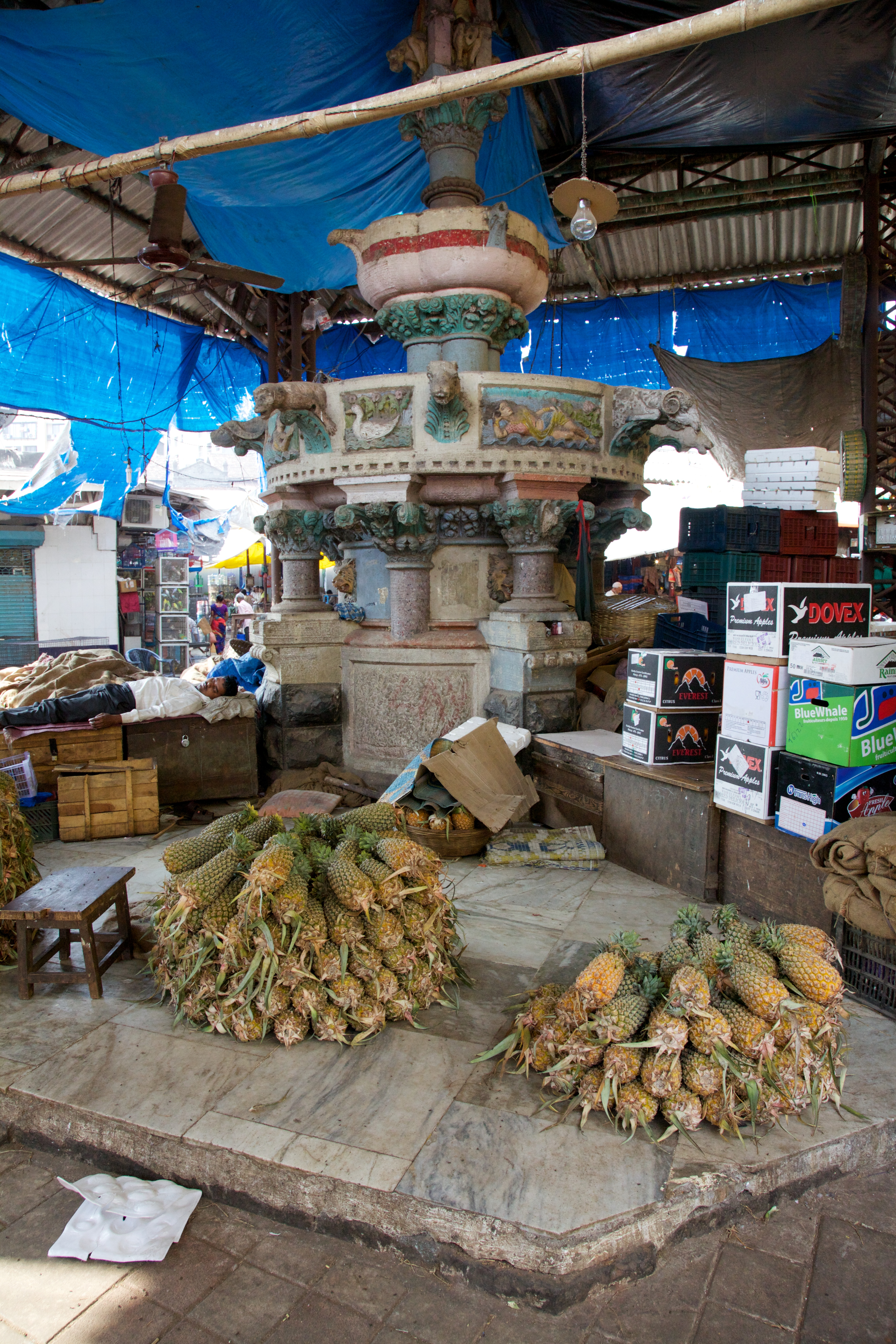
Another view of the Crawford Market fountain

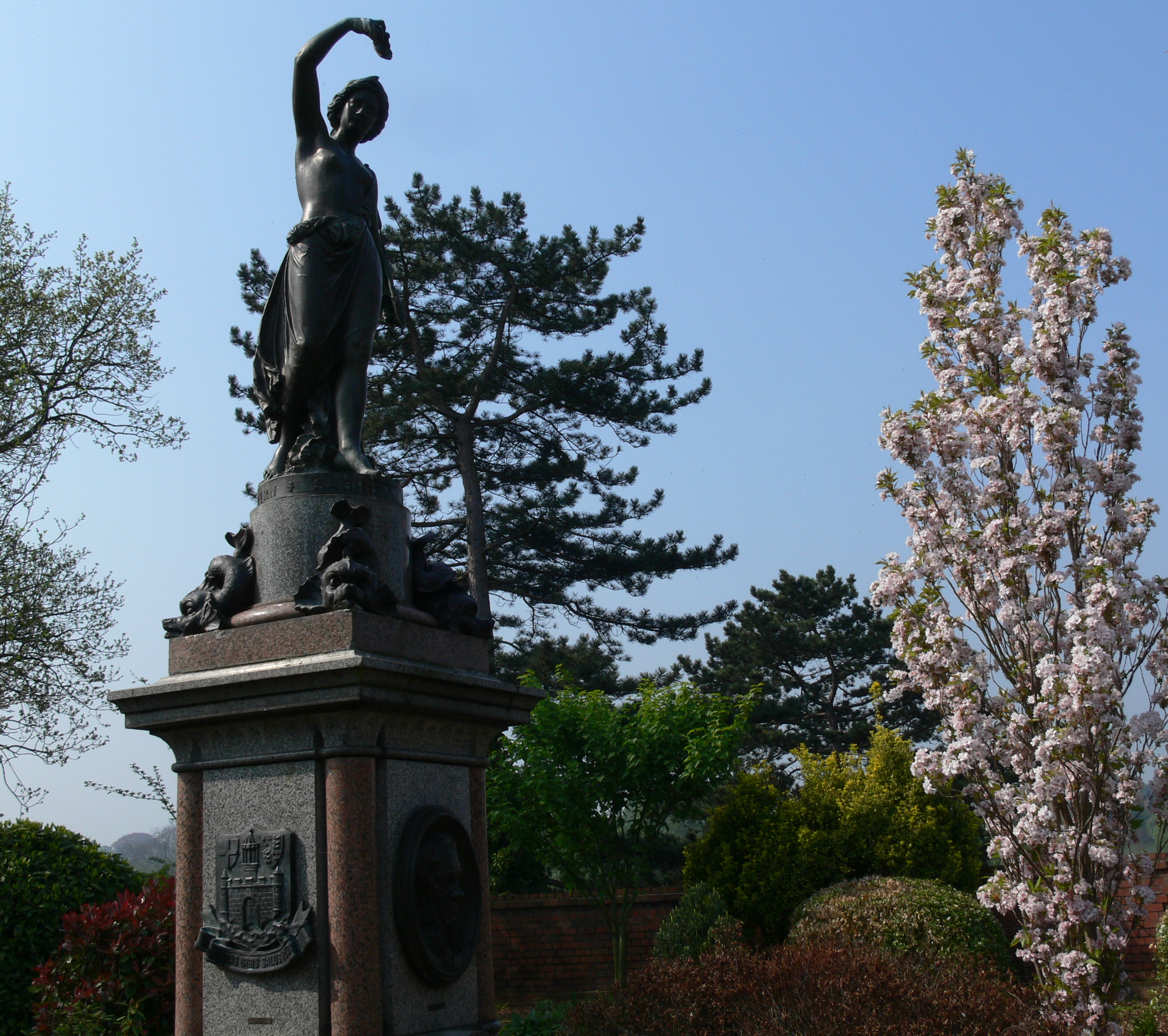
The Sabrina Fountain at Bridgnorth Castle, Shropshire by James Milo Griffith (1881)

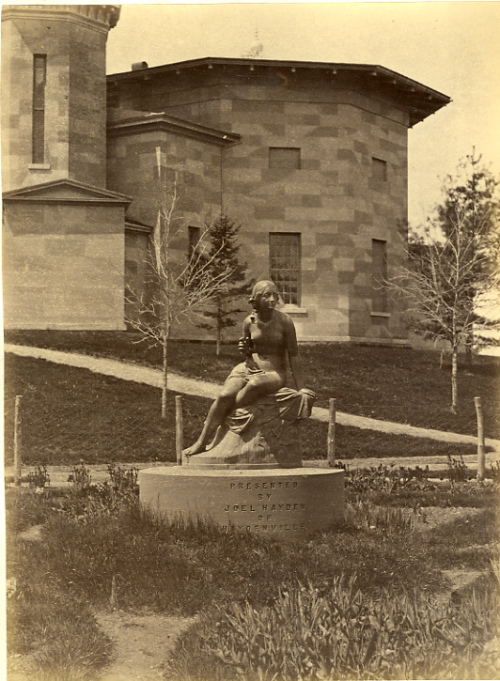
The Statue of Sabrina at Amherst College, Massachusetts by William Calder Marshall (1857)

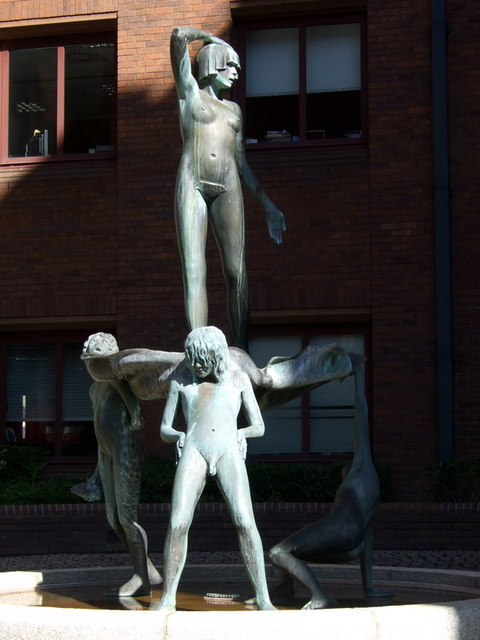
The Apotheosis of Sabrina, Bristol, by Gerald Laing (1980)

== Sources ==
- Crook, J. Mordaunt (1981). William Burges and the High Victorian Dream. London: John Murray. ISBN 978-0-7195-3822-3.
- London, Christopher W. (2002). Bombay Gothic. Mumbai: India Book House. ISBN 978-8-175-08329-5.
- Pullan, Richard Popplewell (1887). The Architectural Designs of William Burges. OCLC 4142972.
