= Alexandra Girls' English Institution =

Location
- 31, Hazarimal Somani Marg, Mumbai, Maharashtra 400001; India
- 18°56′07″N 72°49′53″E

Information
- Former name: Alexandra Native Girls' English Institution
- Type: Private
- Motto: Trust In God And Be Not Daunted
- Established: 1 September 1863
- Founder: Manockjee Cursetjee
- Principal: Mrs. Kashmira Sarkari
- Staff: 63
- Gender: Girls
- Enrollment: 830
- Language: English
- Affiliation: Maharashtra State Board of Secondary and Higher Secondary Education (5–10); Indian Certificate of Secondary Education (nursery–4)
- Website: alexandragei.org

The Alexandra Girls' English Institution (commonly abbreviated as the AGEI), formerly known as the Alexandra Native Girls' English Institution, is a girls-only school in Mumbai, Maharashtra, India. Established on 1 September 1863 by Manockjee Cursetjee at his residence Villa Byculla, the institution is named after Princess Alexandra, who became the Princess of Wales upon her marriage to Albert Edward, Prince of Wales on 10 March 1863.

The school was later moved to its present location at Hazarimal Somani Marg. Imparting education from nursery to tenth grade, the school is affiliated with the Indian Certificate of Secondary Education for all the grades up to fourth grade and with the Maharashtra State Board of Secondary and Higher Secondary Education from fifth to tenth grade. Its student–teacher ratio, 1:17, is better than the national ratio of 1:24.

== Foundation ==
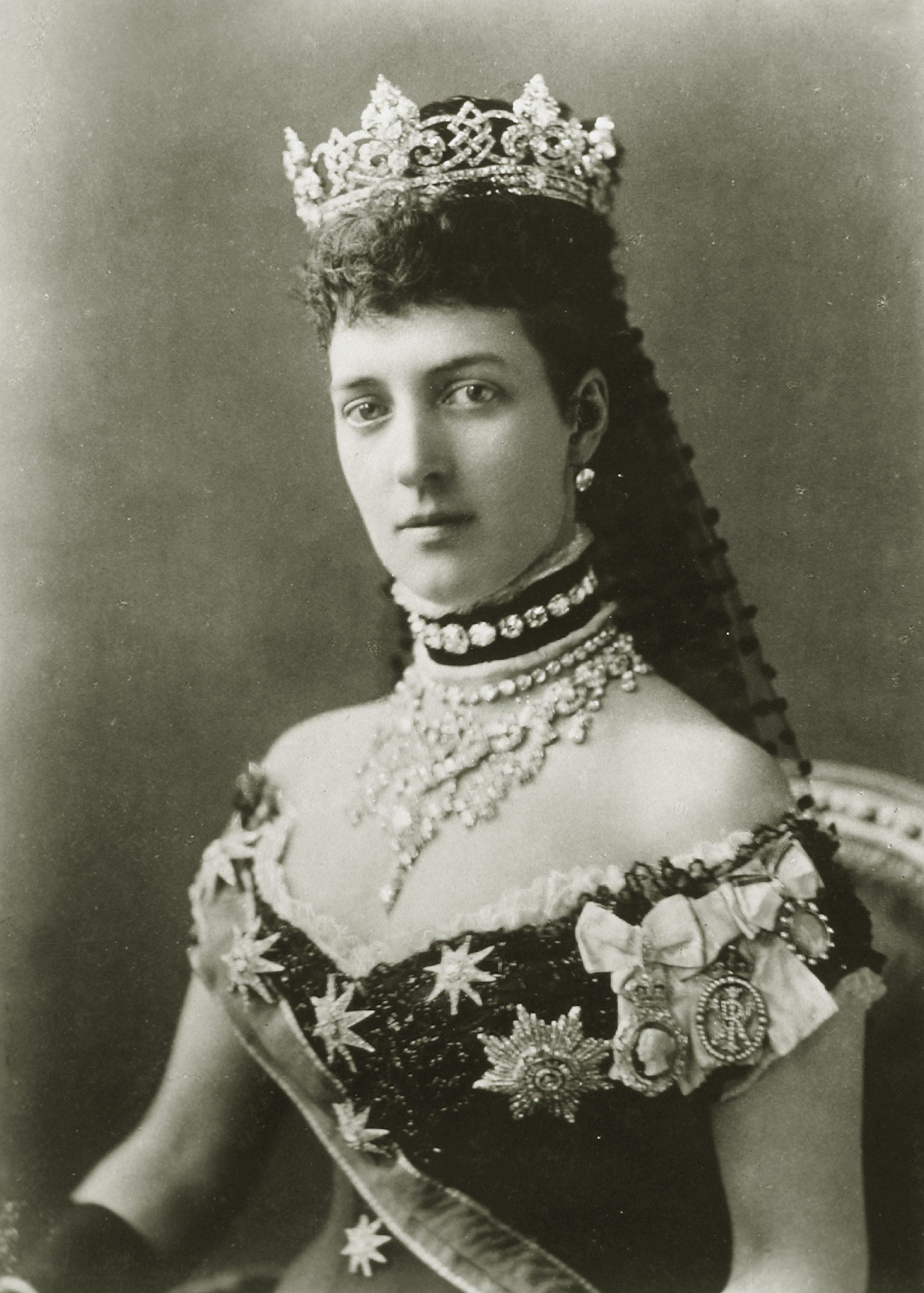
The school was named after Alexandra, Princess of Wales.

The school was founded by Parsi businessman and judge Manockjee Cursetjee as the Alexandra Native Girls' English Institution on 1 September 1863 at his residence Villa Byculla in Mumbai (then known as Bombay). He was of opinion that to bring the "required change in society" women's education was important, and with this vision he started this English medium school for Indian girls, initially with 13 students. It was named after Alexandra of Denmark, then Princess of Wales (who later became the queen consort of the United Kingdom and the British Dominions, and empress consort of India), as Cursetjee believed that she would be an "ideal" for the girls to look up to. The school was later moved to its present location at Hazarimal Somani Marg. It is one of the oldest girls' schools in Mumbai.

The school reached its 150th anniversary in 2013 and started its sesquicentennial celebration 1 September 2012. The year-long celebration included issuing of a special postal cover, an inter-school festival, reunion of alumni and releasing school souvenir in April 2013.

== Administration ==
The school is affiliated with the Maharashtra State Board of Secondary and Higher Secondary Education (MSBSHSE). However, it follows Indian Certificate of Secondary Education for all the grades up to fourth grade, and from fifth to tenth grades it follows the Secondary School Certificate curriculum of the MSBSHSE. It is divided into four different sections: pre-primary section comprises grades nursery, lower and higher kindergarten, primary section is from first to fourth grade, middle section includes fifth to seventh grades and secondary school is made up of eighth, ninth and tenth grades. Each grade is further divided into two divisions. The average strength of each grade is 35 and with a current strength of 63 teachers the student–teacher ratio of the school is 1:17, which is better than the national ratio of 1:24.

== Notable alumni ==
- Bhikaiji Cama – an Indian independence activist.
- Ruby Patel – a Parsi–Gujarati theatre actor.
- Tanaaz Irani – a Hindi film and television actor.
