= Haj House, Aurangabad =

Building in India

Haj House Aurangabad
- Interactive map of the Haj House Aurangabad area

General information
- Type: House of Haj pilgrims
- Architectural style: Expressionist
- Location: Shahi Masjid Road, Haj house Aurangabad, Maharashtra 431001 India
- Coordinates: 19.8910613°N 75.3262617°E

Technical details
- Structural system: Concrete frame and precast concrete ribbed roof

Haj House Aurangabad is a complex in Aurangabad in the Indian state of Maharashtra. It provides accommodation to the Hajj bound Muslim people. Being the largest state of India, Maharashtra has the maximum quota for haj pilgrims in India. Maharashtra Haj Committee is situated in the, Mumbai. The Member of the Lok Sabha from Aurangabad Lok Sabha Constituency, Syed Imtiyaz Jaleel demanded that the inauguration should be done by the incumbent Chief Minister, Eknath Shinde.

== History ==
The proposal to construct the Haj House and Vande Mataram hall in Aurangabad was officially approved by the Chief Minister, Prithviraj Chavan, during a crucial decision-making meeting. The meeting also involved key stakeholders, including the Aurangabad Guardian Minister, Abdul Sattar, and the Minister for School Education, Fauzia Khan. The meeting's agenda was to address the pressing need for these facilities and ensure their timely construction. Chief Minister Chavan demonstrated his commitment to this cause by allocating a substantial budget of Rs 52 crore for the project.

Prior to the government's official approval, numerous citizens and activists had resorted to agitation and even embarked on indefinite hunger strikes in December 2012. Their persistent efforts were aimed at urging the state government to fulfill the long-pending demand for the construction of the Haj House in Aurangabad. Of the allocated budget, Rs 29 crore was earmarked for the construction of the Haj House, the foundation stone-laying ceremonies for building. The Chief Minister and concerned officials, including Municipal Commissioner Harshadeep Kamble, District Collector, and Cidco Administrator Sunil Kendrekar, worked to expedite the project. Chief Minister Chavan directed officials to initiate the tendering process for construction before the end of the month, with a clear objective to commence construction work by July 15.

== See also ==
- Haj House (Mumbai)
- Haj House, Lucknow
- Aurangabad, Maharashtra
- List of Haj Houses in India
