= Ghodapdeo =

- Neighbourhood
- Location within Mumbai
- Coordinates: 18°59′8″N 72°50′21″E
- Country: India
- State: Maharashtra
- District: Mumbai City
- City: Mumbai

Government
  - Type: Municipal Corporation
  - Body: Brihanmumbai Municipal Corporation (MCGM)

Languages
  - Official: Marathi
- Time zone: UTC+5:30 (IST)
- PIN: 400033
- Area code: 022
- Vehicle registration: MH 01
- Civic agency: BMC

Ghodapdeo is a neighborhood in Byculla, Mumbai.

Ghodapdeo lies between Cotton Green, Reay Road, Raani Baug, Mustafa Bazaar and Kaala Chowki. It consists mainly of the labour class population. The main language spoken is Marathi. A wide range of industrial units and individual factories are scattered all over the neighborhood.

A small temple of god named 'Ghodapdeo' is built here and thus the name given is Ghodapdeo Road. Historically this area was for cloth mills but after liberalisation (post 1990) all the mills were shut down and only 1 mill was operating till 2011. From 2006 full round of redevelopment started in Ghodapdeo and now there are handful of iconic chawls. Though majority of population in Ghodapdeo is Maharashtrian, Rajasthani and Gujarati population is also substantial.
