= Haj House (Mumbai) =

Building in India

Coordinates: 18.945333°N 72.835237°E

Haj House Mumbai
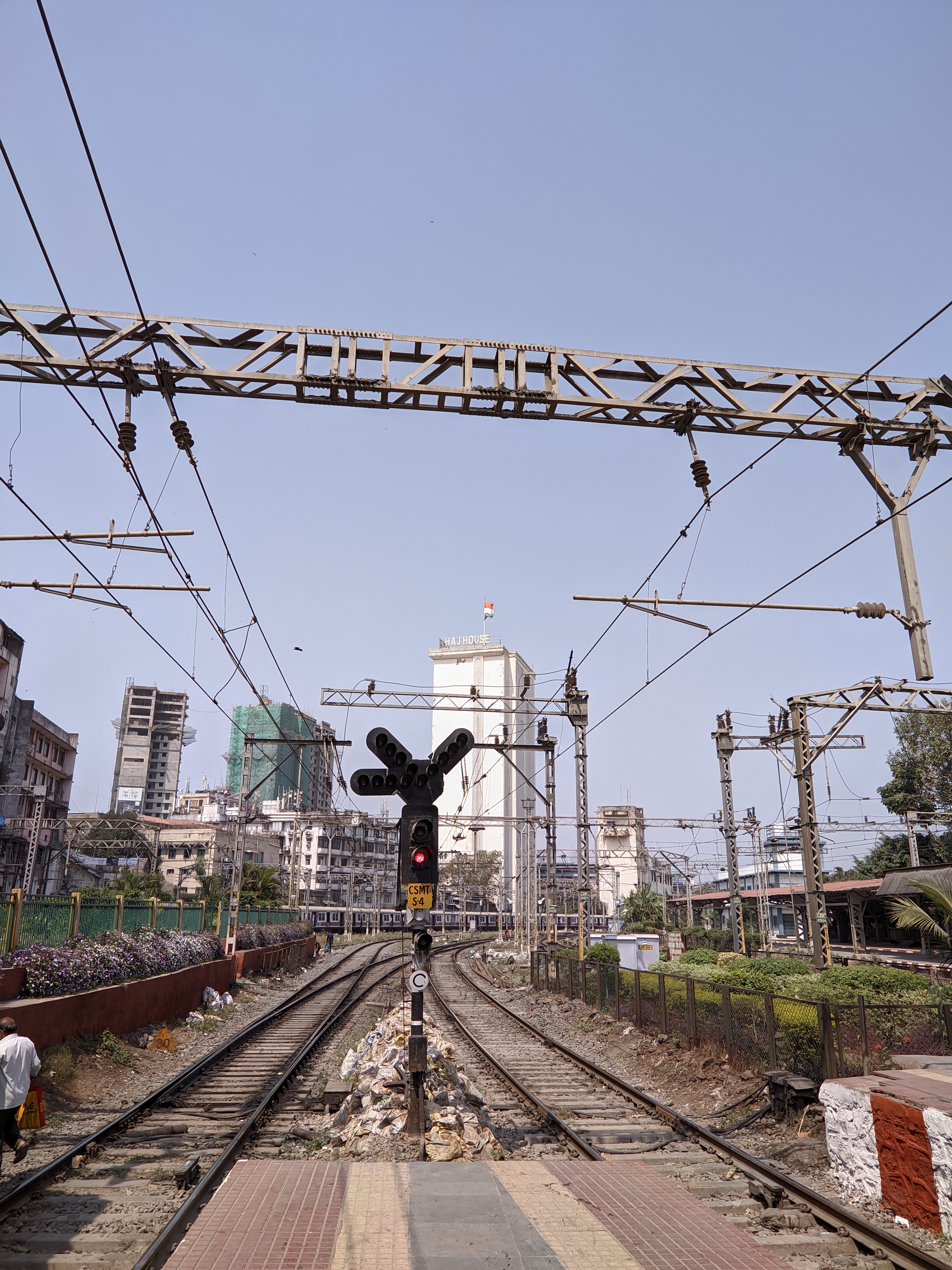
- A view of Haj House from CSMT, Mumbai
- Interactive map of the Haj House Mumbai area

General information
- Type: House of Haj pilgrims
- Architectural style: Expressionist
- Location: Haj Committee Of India, JJ Flyover, Fort, Mumbai, Maharashtra 400001, India
- Construction started: 1976
- Opened: 1987

Technical details
- Structural system: Concrete frame and precast concrete ribbed roof

Haj House is a 19-storey building in Mumbai. It provides accommodation to the Haj bound Muslim people. It was constructed in 1987. A group named Sahyog Cultural Society gives training and hold orientation program for pilgrims in this house.

== See also ==
- Haj House, Lucknow
- Haj House, Aurangabad
- List of Haj Houses in India
