= Crawford Market Fountain =

Historic fountain in Mumbai, India

Mahatma Phule Market Fountain
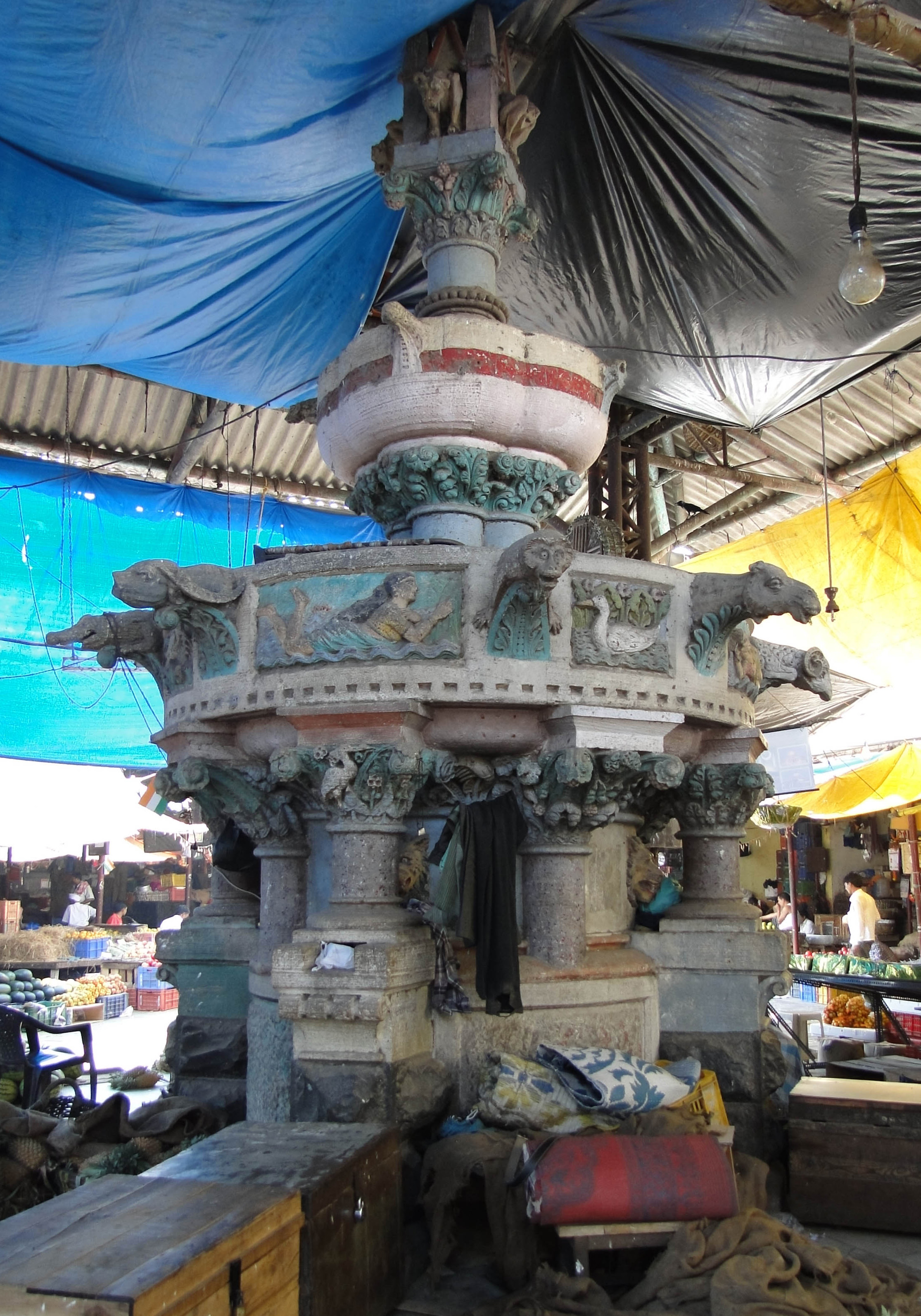
- The historic fountain is in poor condition and often encroached upon, even after restoration efforts

- Location within Mumbai Location within India
- 18.947414°N 72.834710°E
- Location: Mahatma Phule Market

History
- Built: 1874

Site notes
- Area: South Mumbai
- Architect: William Emerson
- Architectural styles: A mix of Greek Revival and Neo-Gothic

Crawford Market Fountain or Lockwood Kipling Fountain is a listed heritage structure in Crawford Market, Mumbai that was erected in 1874, and was designed by William Emerson, the British architect who also designed the market. The style is a mix of Greek Revival and Neo-Gothic, and the four carvings depicting the Indian river goddesses and native birds were done by John Lockwood Kipling (father of novelist Rudyard Kipling), who was the principal at Sir Jamsetjee Jeejebhoy School of Art.

Originally, it was located in a garden courtyard setting and was meant to serve as a social space for merchants. The uncontrolled proliferation of shops around it led to a drastic change in setting, and today vegetable and fruit sellers often set up their stalls around it or use the structure to temporarily store their wares.

In 1985, the crown of the fountain was damaged when a canopy was being raised over it. The Kipling river goddesses frieze was also painted over by someone with the intention to restore their "modesty", as claimed in a note left by the conscientious painter on the fountain. In 2016–17, as part of a larger project, restoration work was carried out on the fountain by a team led by conservation architect Abha Narain Lambah, but thereafter the structure continued to be used as a mini warehouse or a dumping site for plastic bags, water bottles or garbage.

The fountain exhibits remarkable similarities to an unexecuted design by William Burges, the Sabrina Fountain which Burges planned for Gloucester, England. The debt owed by Emerson is noted by Christopher London in his work, Bombay Gothic. (Note: "The design source for Bombay's fountain derives directly from Burges's drawn fantasies for the Sabrina Fountain.")

== Sources ==
- London, Christopher W. (2002). Bombay Gothic. Mumbai: India Book House. ISBN 978-8-175-08329-5.
