= JJ flyover =

Elevated roadway in Mumbai, India

JJ Flyover
- Location in South Mumbai

Route information
- Maintained by Maharashtra State Road Development Corporation (MSRDC)
- Length: 2.5 km (1.6 mi)

Major junctions
- From: Crawford Market
- Mohammed Ali Road, Bhendi Bazaar, Nagpada, Null Bazaar
- To: Byculla

Location
- Country: India
- State: Maharashtra

Highway system
- Roads in India; Expressways; National; State; Asian; State Highways in Maharashtra

JJ Flyover (short for Jija Mata Jijabai Flyover) is one of the earliest elevated roadways in Mumbai, India. Stretching approximately 2.5 kilometers, it connects Crawford Market in the south to Byculla in the north, passing over the congested neighborhoods of Mohammed Ali Road, Null Bazaar, and Nagpada.

== History ==
JJ Flyover was named after Maharani Jijabai (also known as Jija Mata), the mother of Shivaji, the founder of the Maratha Empire. The flyover was built in the early 2000s to relieve traffic congestion in South Mumbai and was one of the city's most ambitious infrastructure projects at the time.

The project was undertaken by the Maharashtra State Road Development Corporation (MSRDC) and opened to the public in 2002.

== Design and Route ==
The flyover starts near Crawford Market and ends near Byculla, passing over key intersections at Mohammed Ali Road, Bhendi Bazaar, and JJ Hospital. The road below is known for heavy pedestrian and vehicular traffic, and the flyover was designed to streamline north–south movement in this corridor.

The structure consists of multiple ramps and pillars that rise above residential and commercial zones, including heritage precincts.

== Impact ==
JJ Flyover reduced surface-level congestion on Mohammed Ali Road and significantly cut down travel time between South and Central Mumbai. It served as a model for later flyovers constructed throughout the city, including in Sion, Bandra, and Goregaon.

However, its construction also led to controversies over:

- Damage to the visual aesthetics of heritage structures
- Increased noise pollution for residents living directly beneath it
- Reduced sunlight for old buildings in the area

== Criticism and Legacy ==
Although the JJ Flyover eased vehicular traffic, many urbanists have criticized it for ignoring pedestrian infrastructure. Studies have shown that flyovers often displace problems rather than solving them and encourage more cars without addressing public transport or walkability.

Nevertheless, JJ Flyover remains an iconic part of Mumbai's transport network, often seen as a gateway between the historic and commercial sections of the city.

== See also ==
- Mohammed Ali Road
- Crawford Market
- Bhendi Bazaar
- Transport in Mumbai
