= Manockjee Cursetjee =

Parsi businessman, judge, reformer and proponent of female education from Bombay

Manockjee Cursetjee (also Manekji Khurshedji Shroff) (1808–1887) was a Parsi businessman and judge from Bombay, remembered as a reformer and proponent of female education.

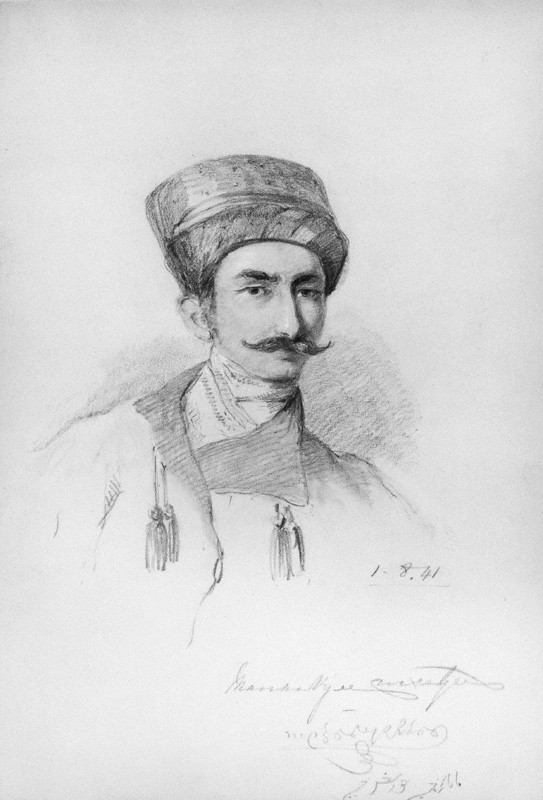
Manockjee Cursetjee, 1841 drawing by William Brockedon.

== Life ==
Cursetjee was the son of Cursetjee Manockjee Shroff, and had an English education, under a Mr. Mackay at Joliffe's school, near St. Thomas's Church. In the 1830s, he knew John Wilson, whom he met socially in 1829. He obtained a government post in the Bombay Presidency, and became a member of the Royal Asiatic Society. In 1843 he became a Fellow of the Royal Geographical Society.

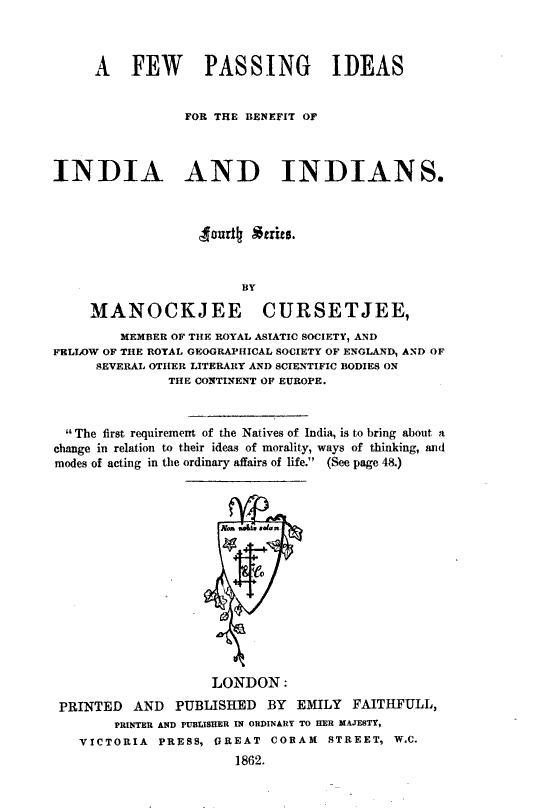
Title page from an 1862 book by Manockjee Cursetjee, published by Emily Faithfull

Cursetjee was a noted Anglophile, and came into conflict with the local Parsi Panchayat. He began to criticise them, in the Bombay Times, in 1844–5. He visited the United Kingdom three times. On one visit to London, he met Arthur Wellesley, 2nd Duke of Wellington, whose father Arthur Wellesley had been entertained by his own father in Bombay at a garden party.

In 1859 Cursetjee started the first English school for Indian girls. Initially it was in his house, "Villa Byculla", with an English governess and his daughters as staff. The initiative gained the support of Kharshedji Nasarwanji Cama and John Elliot Drinkwater Bethune. In 1863, with a land grant and a donation from Cursetjee, the Alexandra Native Girls' English Institution set up in its own premises.

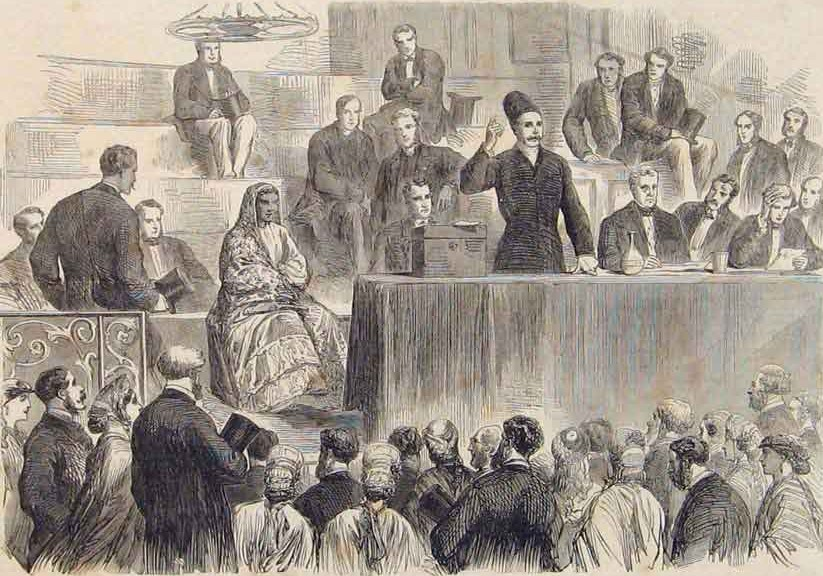
At the 1865 Social Science Congress in Sheffield, Manockjee Cursetjee speaks on female education in India

In 1863, also, Cursetjee joined the Faculty of Law of Bombay University. In 1866 he addressed the Social Science Congress in Sheffield, England, on education in India.

== Legacy ==
The school Cursetjee founded, the Alexandra Girls' English Institution named after Alexandra of Denmark (originally the Alexandra Native Girls' Institution), still exists.

Cursetjee set up a public monument, now known as the "Khada Parsi", to commemorate his father. Its location is now between two flyovers in Byculla.

== Family ==
His second son Cursetjee Manockjee studied at Oxford University and Lincoln's Inn. He was the first Indian to be admitted as an Oxford undergraduate in 1864. Another son, Jehangir Manockjee Cursetjee, matriculated at Trinity College, Cambridge in 1867.
