= Gloria Church =

Church in Byculla, Mumbai

Gloria Church Nossa Senhora de Gloria
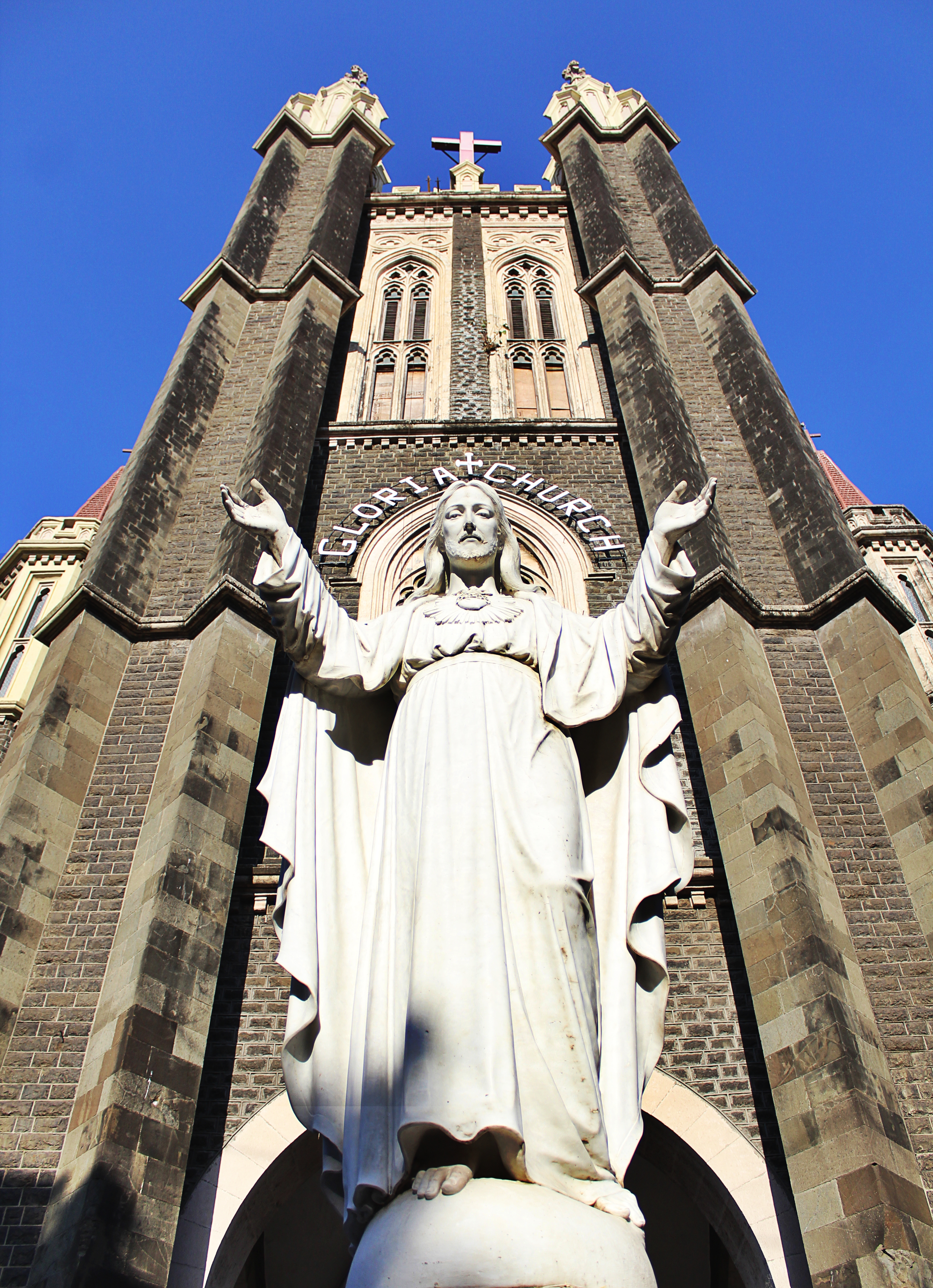
- Gloria church, in 2015

Religion
- Affiliation: Roman Catholic
- Rite: Latin
- Ecclesiastical or organisational status: Active
- Year consecrated: original structure 1632; 394 years ago

Location
- Location: Byculla, Mumbai, India
- Interactive map of Gloria Church; Nossa Senhora de Gloria
- Coordinates: 18.975°N 72.834167°E

Architecture
- Style: English Gothic Revival
- Completed: 1913; 113 years ago
- Minaret: 4

Gloria Church or Our Lady of Glory Church (Portuguese: Nossa Senhora de Gloria) was built in 1911-13 on one of the oldest Roman Catholic church sites in Mumbai; its predecessor was built by the Portuguese Franciscans in 1632. The church is situated in Byculla, Mumbai. In 2019, the restoration project for the church received the Award of Merit under the UNESCO Asia-Pacific Awards for Cultural Heritage Conservation.

== History ==
The original Gloria Church, Nossa Senhora da Glória, was built in 1632 at the foot of the Mazagaon hill. This Franciscan church was funded by the De Souza e Lima family, who owned the Mazagaon island which they procured from the King of Portugal in 1572. The old church was demolished in 1911 and the present one, built at Byculla, was opened in 1913.

== Architecture ==
The modern Gloria church was built in English Gothic Revival style. The crowning achievement in church-building was the erection of Nossa Senhora da Gloria at Byculla (1912), an imposing structure in English Gothic style.

== Popular culture ==
The church’s beauty has inspired many filmmakers to shoot their films on its premises. Prominent among them was Manmohan Desai’s Amar Akbar Anthony, released in 1977.
