= Khada Parsi =

Heritage statue in Byculla, Mumbai

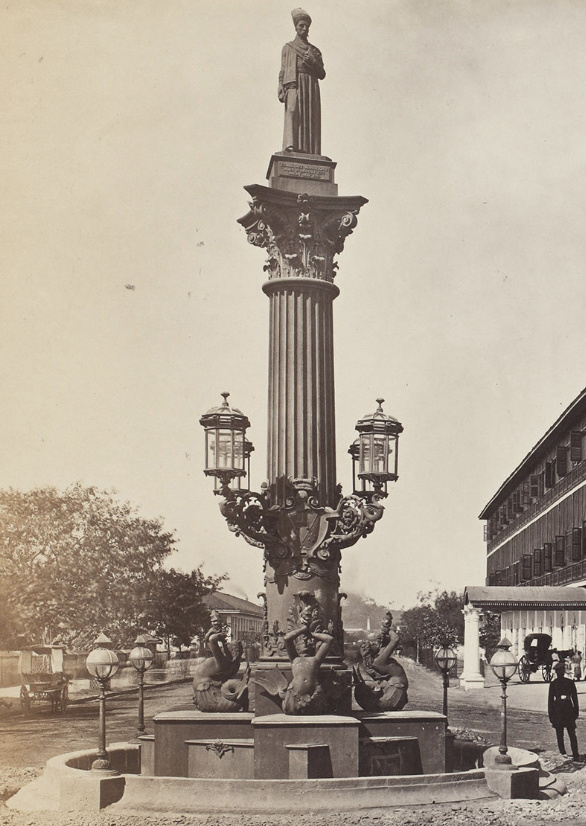
- Standing Parsi Statue or the Khada Parsi, c. 1870
- Interactive map of Khada Parsi
- Location: Byculla, Mumbai, India
- Coordinates: 18°58′18″N 72°49′57″E
- Type: Statue
- Material: Cast iron
- Height: 40 feet (12 m)
- Beginning date: 1865
- Completion date: 1867
- Restored date: 2014
- Dedicated to: Cursetjee Manockjee (1763—1845)

Khada Parsi, Ubha Parsi (Note: in the Marathi language) (transl. Standing Parsi) (Note: Rais Shaikh, MLA and corporator of the area, claims that the statue is actually referred to as the "Khara Parsi" (transl. True Parsi)) or Cursetjee Fountain is a Grade 1 heritage monument located in Byculla, Mumbai, India. Installed in 1867, the monument features a life-sized cast iron statue of Cursetjee Manockjee (19 August 1763 — 7 May 1845), a prominent Parsi businessman and philanthropist, atop a pillar and surrounded by mermaid fountains. It is considered one of the oldest Parsi statues in Mumbai.

== History ==
=== Commissioning ===
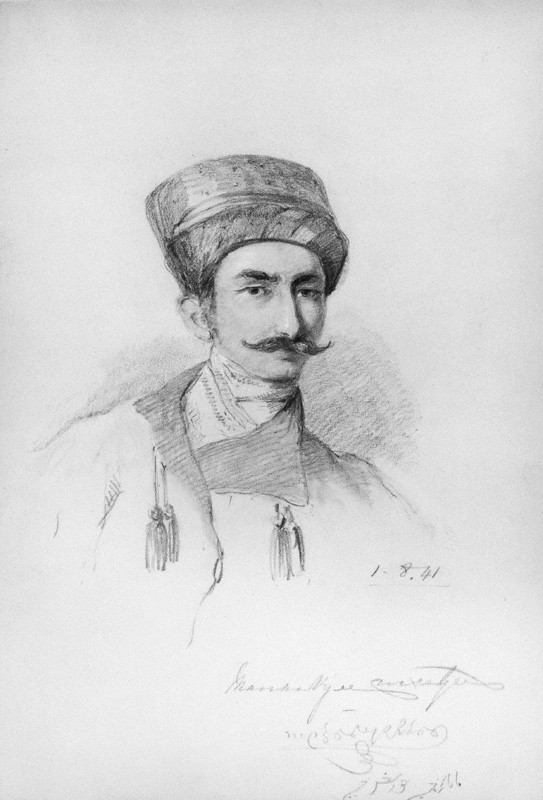
Manockjee Cursetjee commissioned the statue as a tribute to his father

The monument was commissioned by Manockjee Cursetjee as a tribute to his father, Cursetjee Manockjee, a philanthropist. In 1862, Manockjee Cursetjee visited an international exhibition in London and saw a Chilean fountain on display, featuring four waterspout mermaid fountains surrounding the ancient goddess Ceres. This statue was commissioned by Chilean politician Pascual Binemelis Campos and was installed in the city of Concepción, Chile in 1857. This statue inspired Cursetjee to dedicate a monument to his father.

In 1865, he went to London once again, accompanied by his daughter Serene, and commissioned fountain maker John Bell to build the structure. The total cost of the monument at the time was approximately ₹20,000 (equivalent to ₹9.9 million or US$100,000 in 2023).

=== Installation ===
Municipal officials objected to the installation of the statue. Manockjee Cursetjee then reclaimed some land in Byculla that he had donated and got the statue installed, without any formal approval or any formal inauguration. It thus became only the third statue of an Indian in Bombay after those of Jamsetjee Jejeebhoy and Jagannath Shankarseth.

=== Reverence by locals ===
Soon after, Govind Narayan, a historian, stated that locals began treating it "almost as an object of worship, offering coconuts and prayers." They would collect the water from the fountain for their use and use the lamps as streetlights.

=== Neglect ===
By 1915, there were reports of its neglect, with reports stating that the lamps were missing and that the fountains were running dry.

=== Shift in location and donation to BMC ===
The statue was initially installed on the one end of Clare Road in Byculla. In 1928, it was relocated to its current location on the other side of Clare Road, at the base of the Byculla bridge.

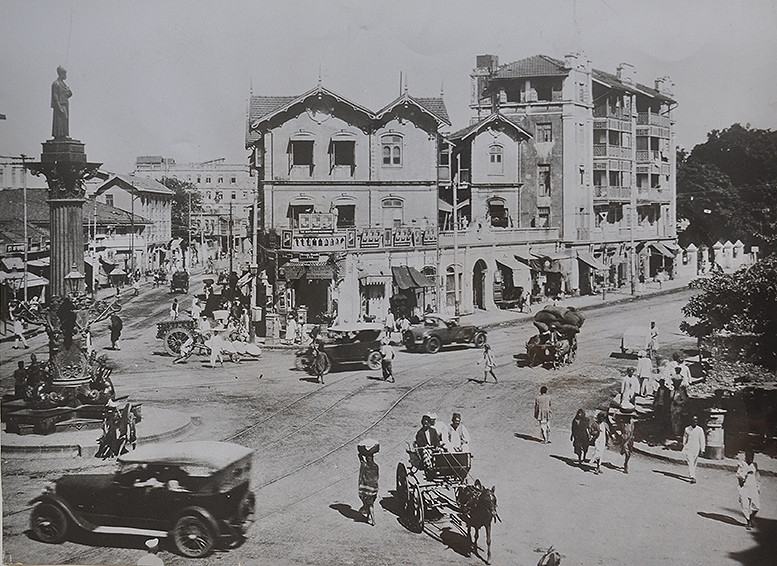
Khada Parsi and vintage cars, c. 1929

The statue was then presented to the Brihanmumbai Municipal Corporation (BMC) by the family with the condition that it be maintained and provided with a continuous water supply for its fountains. While it was initially placed in a more prominent, open setting, urban development eventually resulted in it being hemmed in by two major flyovers: the Y-shaped flyover and the Byculla flyover.

== Design ==
The life-size statue of Cursetjee Manockjee is depicted as a man with a moustache who is dressed in traditional Parsi attire, the jama-pichori, and a shawl draped over his shoulders. In its left hand, the statue holds two pieces of sandalwood while it holds a book in its right hand, signifying scriptures from Zoroastrianism. An identifying plaque states:

Cursetjee Manockjee. Born 19th August 1763. Died 7th May 1845.

The central pillar on which the statue stands is about 40 feet (12 m) tall. The pillar resembles the pillars of Ashoka and the Persepolitan columns. The base of the pillar features four mermaids blowing conches, which function as water fountains. The mermaids are depicted with their breasts bare and they have long, curling tails. The mermaids were surrounded by four gas lights, and four more gas lights are placed a little higher on the pillar. The structure is built in the Gothic Revival architecture style.

The fountain's water came from Vihar Water Works and the gas for the lights was sourced from the Bombay Gas Company.

== Relocation proposals ==
Over the decades, the monument was subject to neglect, corrosion, and theft of its bronze lamps. In the late 2010s, the BMC considered shifting the statue to a different location, such as Five Gardens in Matunga or a traffic island near the Bhau Daji Lad Museum, to improve its visibility and protect it from traffic pollution. It was also proposed to be shifted to the Mumbai Fire Brigade headquarters. However, heritage conservationists and the local community opposed the move, arguing that the statue was a landmark intrinsic to Byculla.

== Restoration ==
In 2014, the BMC completed a major restoration project at a cost of approximately ₹2 crore (equivalent to ₹3.2 crore or US$330,000 in 2023). The renovated statue was inaugurated in the presence of Shiv Sena chief Uddhav Thackeray. Pankaj Joshi was the consulting architect for the project, who claims that it is the only cast iron statue in the city. ₹6 lakh (equivalent to ₹9.6 lakh or US$10,000 in 2023) would be spent on its maintenance yearly. The eight gas lamps were restored. The mermaid water fountain was restored with black basalt rock sourced from Rajasthan. More than 400 pieces of the monument were restored using stones from Nagpur, Rajasthan and Mangalore. Sandblasting was done to clean the statue of decades of dirt and dust, after which a special putty was applied and then oxidized to produce a jet black colour. Fresh pipelines for water and gas were constructed; the eight lamps will use around 8 kilograms (280 oz) of gas per hour. Further, a small seating space was cleared around the fountain. Skilled workers from Makrana, Rajasthan, were brought to conduct the stone work.

== Portrayal ==
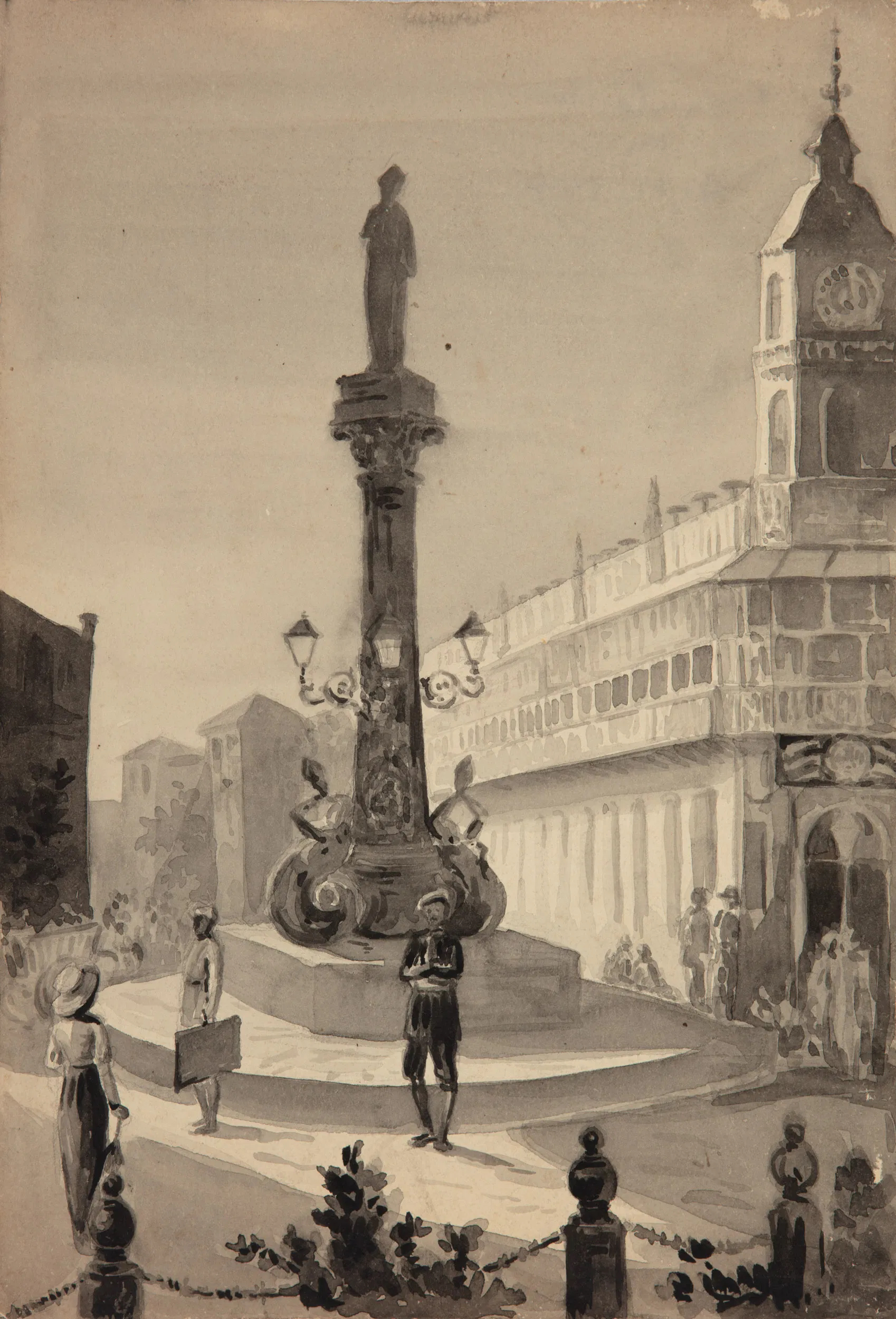
A painting titled Landscape by A. Mali. It features the Khada Parsi fountain statue at Byculla, Mumbai (Dates Unknown)

The statue is portrayed in a 1948 painting by A. S. Tendulkar and in another undated painting by A. Mali. Both these paintings were on display at the Taj Mahal Palace Hotel as part of the Bombay Framed exhibition in April 2026.

In 2014, graphic designer and illustrator Garima Gupta created an animated video featuring the statue.
