= St. Agnes Academy =

St. Agnes Academy may refer to:

- Saint Agnes Academy (Texas), US
- St. Agnes Academy-St. Dominic School, Memphis, Tennessee, US
- St. Agnes Academy (Legazpi City), Philippines
