= Madanpura =

- village
- Location in Uttar Pradesh, India Madanpura (India)
- Coordinates: 25.1580000°N 83.0478400°E
- Country: India
- State: Uttar Pradesh
- District: Mirzapur district

Government
  - Body: Gram panchayat

Languages
  - Official: Hindi
- Time zone: UTC+5:30 (IST)
- ISO 3166 code: RJ-IN
- Vehicle registration: UP
- Website: up.gov.in

Madanpura is a village in the Mirzapur district of Uttar Pradesh, India. It is situated around 20 km from the famous and ancient city of Varanasi. It has good road links with Varanasi and Mirzapur.
