= St. Agnes High School, Mumbai =

Coordinates: 18°58′13.32″N 72°49′51.07″E

St. Agnes High School and Junior College of Commerce
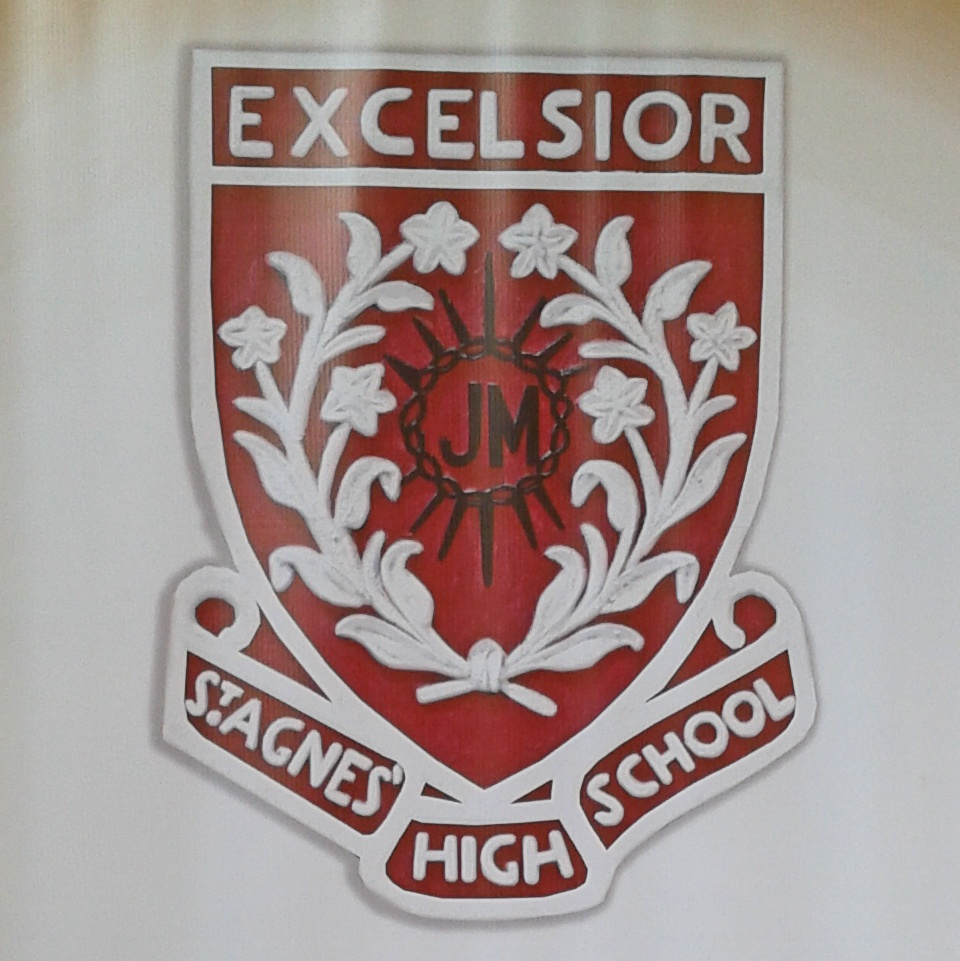
- Mumbai, Maharashtra; India

Information
- Established: 1912
- Locale: Byculla, Mumbai
- Enrollment: 2600
- Website: https://stagneshighschool.org

St. Agnes High School and Junior College of Commerce is a girls school and junior college located on Clare Road, Byculla in Mumbai, India. It is managed by the religious followers of the Convent of Jesus and Mary, affiliated to the Archdiocesan board of Education. This school is under the patronage of St.Agnes, after whom it is named. The school prepares students for S.S.C. examinations conducted by the Maharashtra State Board of Secondary and Higher Secondary Education.To make for more effective management, the school is divided into four house under the patronage of St. Matthew(Red), St. John(Yellow), St. Mark(Blue)and St. Luke(Green). Similarly, the primary section is divided under the patronage of St. Agnes(Red), St. Goretti(Blue), St.Theresa(Yellow) and St. Joan(Green).

== History ==
Started by missionaries of the Convent of Jesus and Mary in 1912. Mother St. Catherine was named as the directress of St. Agnes high school in 1933. she served as a dynamic principal from 1933 up to 1958 St. Agnes High School initially housed two different schools — one affiliated to the Council for the Indian School Certificate Examinations and the other to the Maharashtra State Board. In the early 1970s, the schools were merged into a government-aided state board school. In 1992, a school for special students was started. In the year 2012, the school celebrated its first centenary. Even through the hardships and the past controversies, the school has still kept its name up as its motto.

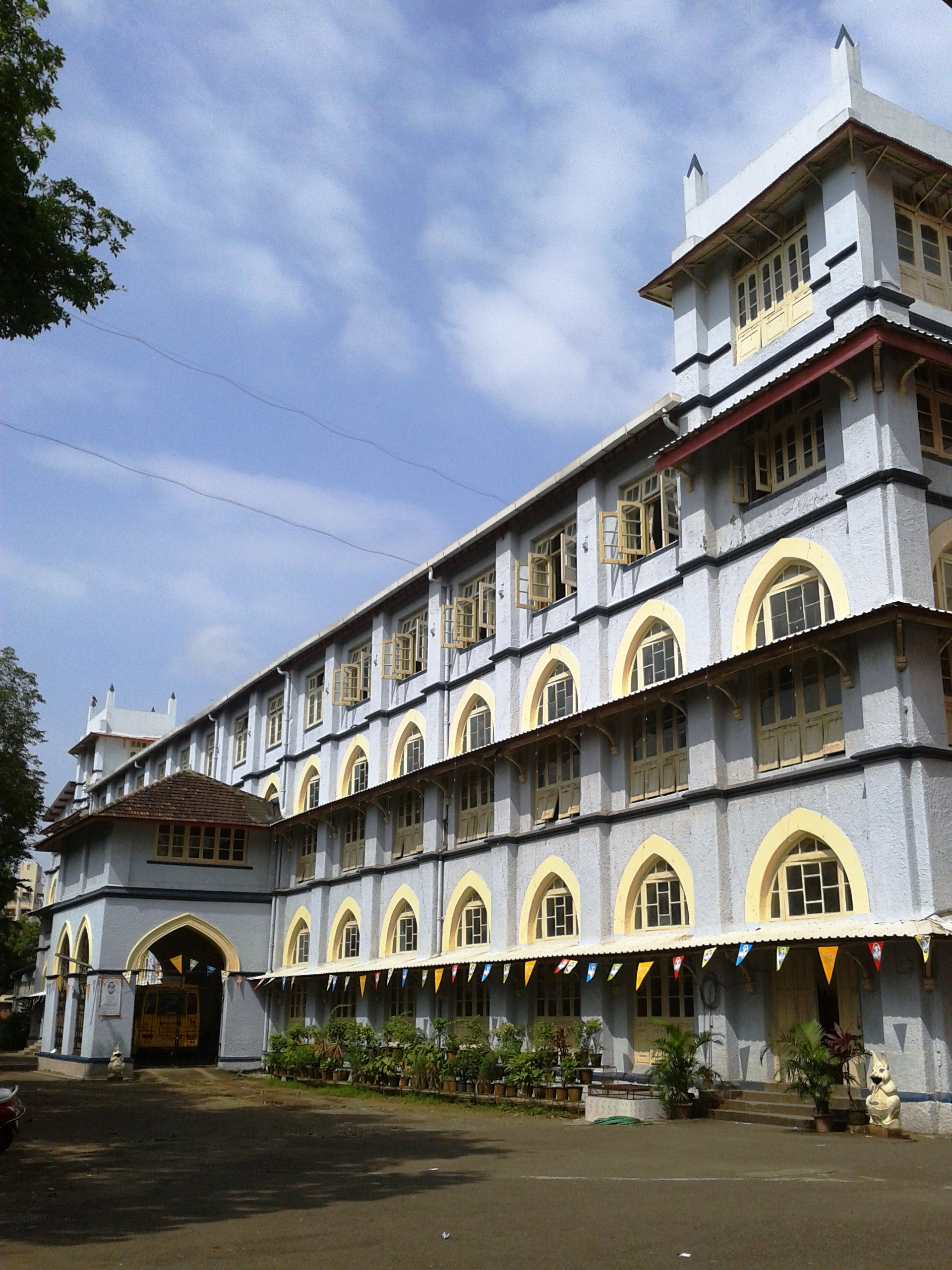
The middle school building

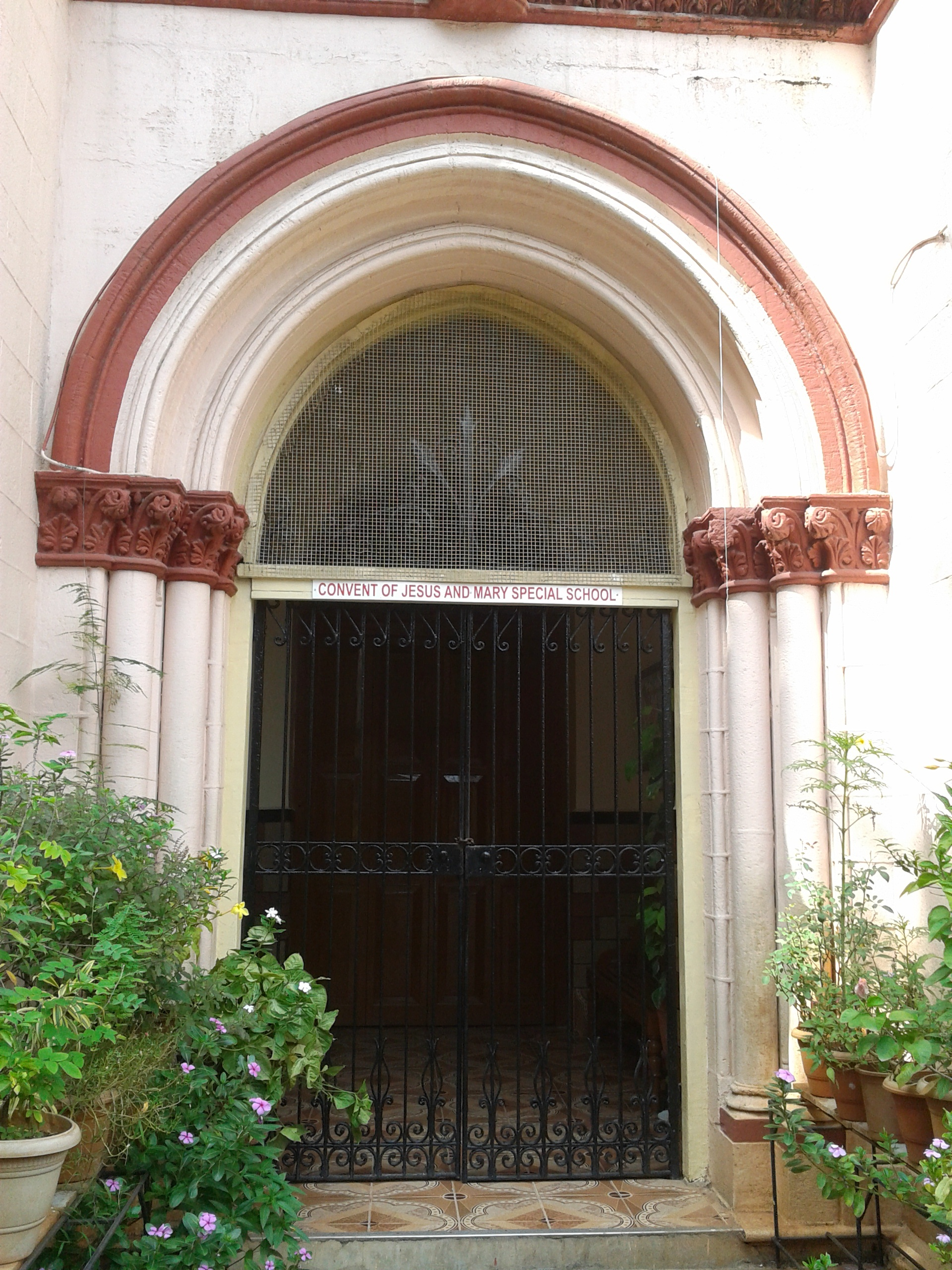
The special school was started in 1992

== Notable alumni ==
The school has produced notables, including singer Usha Uthup and actress Diana Penty.

== See also ==
- List of schools in Mumbai
