= Crawford Market =

- Commercial, Shopping
- Mahatma Jyotiba Phule Mandai
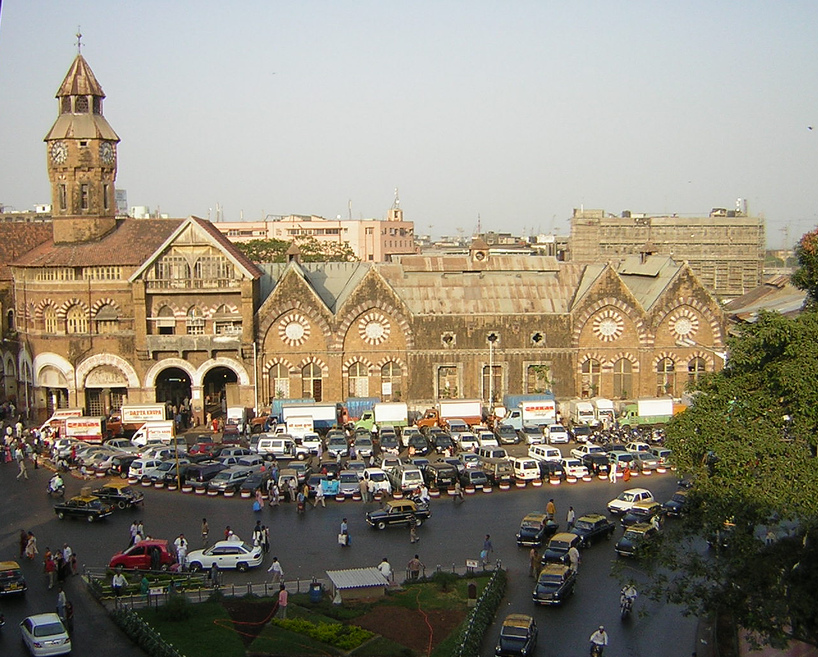
- View of Crawford Market

- Location in Mumbai, India
- Coordinates: 18.947414°N 72.834710°E
- Country: India
- State: Maharashtra
- District: Mumbai City
- City: Mumbai
- Founded by: Cowasji Jehangir

Government
  - Type: Municipal Corporation
  - Body: Brihanmumbai Municipal Corporation (MCGM)

Language
  - Official: Marathi
- Time zone: UTC+5:30 (IST)
- Area code: 022
- Civic agency: BMC

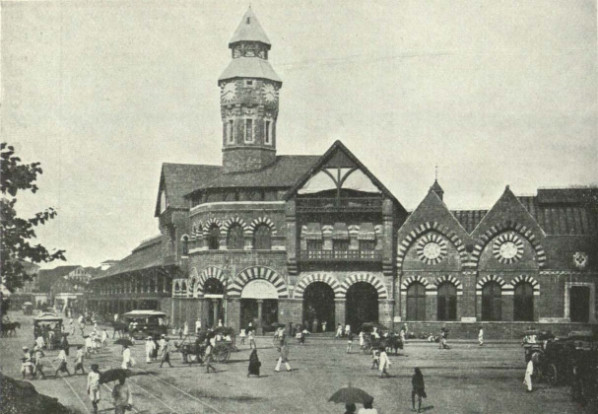
Crawford Market, c. 1905

Crawford Market (officially the Mahatma Jyotiba Phule Mandai) is one of South Mumbai's most famous markets. The building was completed in 1869, and donated to the city by Cowasji Jehangir. Originally named after Arthur Crawford, the first Municipal Commissioner of the city, the market was later renamed to honour the Indian social reformer Mahatma Jotirao Phule. The market is situated opposite the Mumbai Police headquarters, just north of Chhatrapati Shivaji Terminus railway station and west of the JJ flyover at a busy intersection. It was the main wholesale market for fruits in Mumbai until March 1996, when the wholesale traders were relocated to Navi Mumbai.

In 1882, the building was the first in India to be lit up by electricity.

== Architecture ==
The market was designed by British architect William Emerson, and represented an early effort to blend Victorian Gothic architecture with indigenous elements. The market covers an area of 22,471 sq m (2,41,877 sq ft), of which 5,515 sq m (59,363 sq ft) is occupied by the building itself. The structure was built using coarse buff coloured Kurla stone, with redstone from Bassein. It has a 15 m high skylight awning designed to allow the sunlight to brighten up the marketplace.

The original design consisted of three doorways at the entrance, each divided with a column, with space for a carved panel depicting everyday life. Two such panels were carved by the artist, John Lockwood Kipling (the father of author Rudyard Kipling) depicting an image of workers working, but he was not able to complete the third before leaving India.

== Timing ==
This market is mostly closed on Sundays. On other days, it's open from 11:00 am to 8:00 pm.

== Items sold ==
The market houses numerous items, from wholesale fruits, vegetables and poultry to clothes, dress materials, toys, jewelry, and even a pet store. At the pet area, different varieties of dogs, cats, and birds can be found. There have also been stories of the illegal sale of endangered species.

== Reaching there ==
Crawford market area can be reached by taking local trains from Masjid Railway Station, or local buses and cabs.

== See also ==
- Crawford Market Fountain
