= Haj House, Lucknow =

Coordinates: 26.75487°N 80.867717°E

Haj House
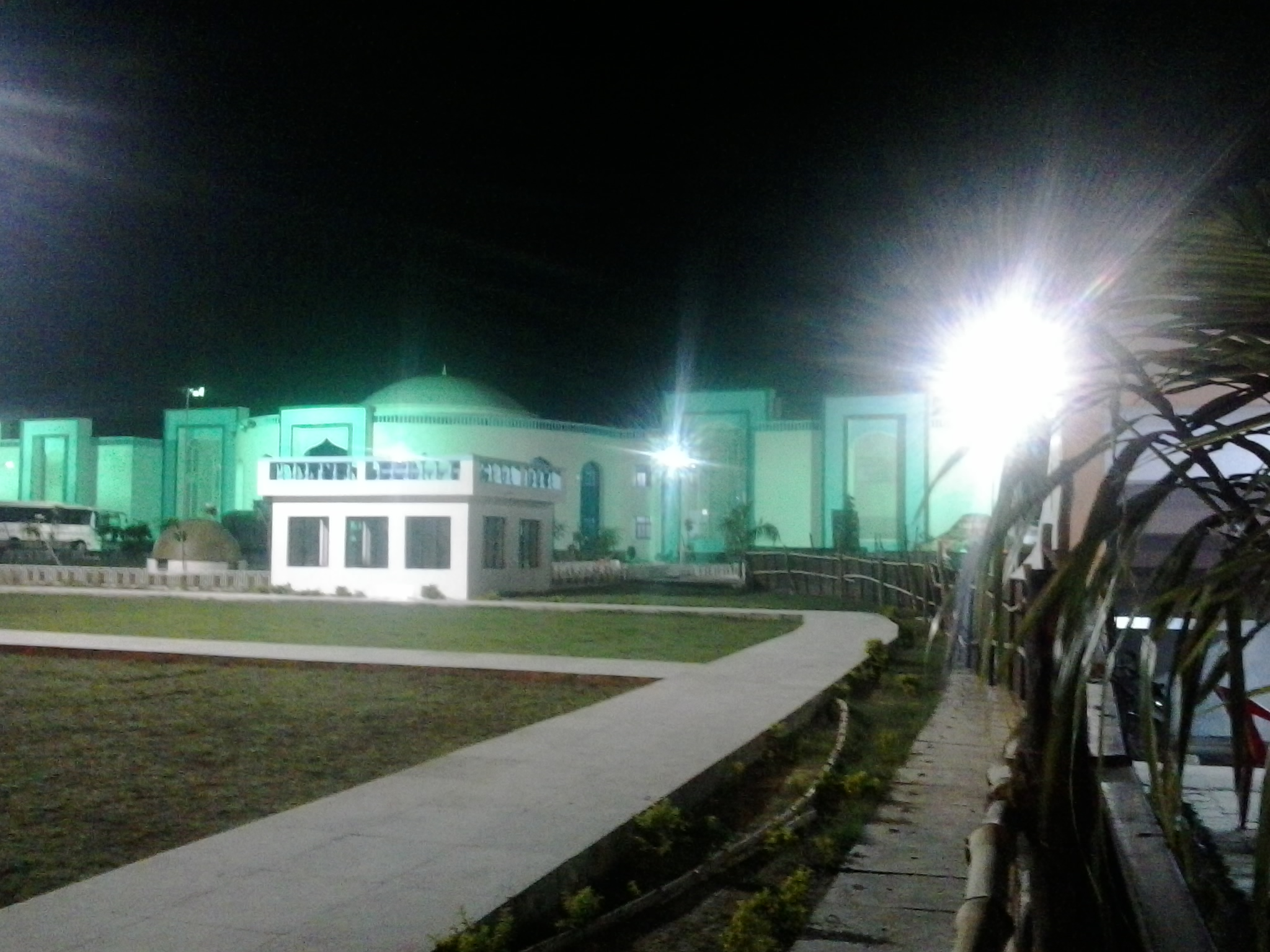
- The Haj House

General information
- Type: House for Indian Haj pilgrims
- Architectural style: Expressionist
- Location: Sarojini Nagar, Lucknow, Uttar Pradesh, India
- Groundbreaking: 2007

Technical details
- Structural system: Concrete frame and precast concrete ribbed roof

The Haj House is a complex in Lucknow, Uttar Pradesh, India. It provides accommodation to Hajj-bound Indian Muslims and is the headquarters of the Uttar Pradesh Haj Committee.

== Gallery ==
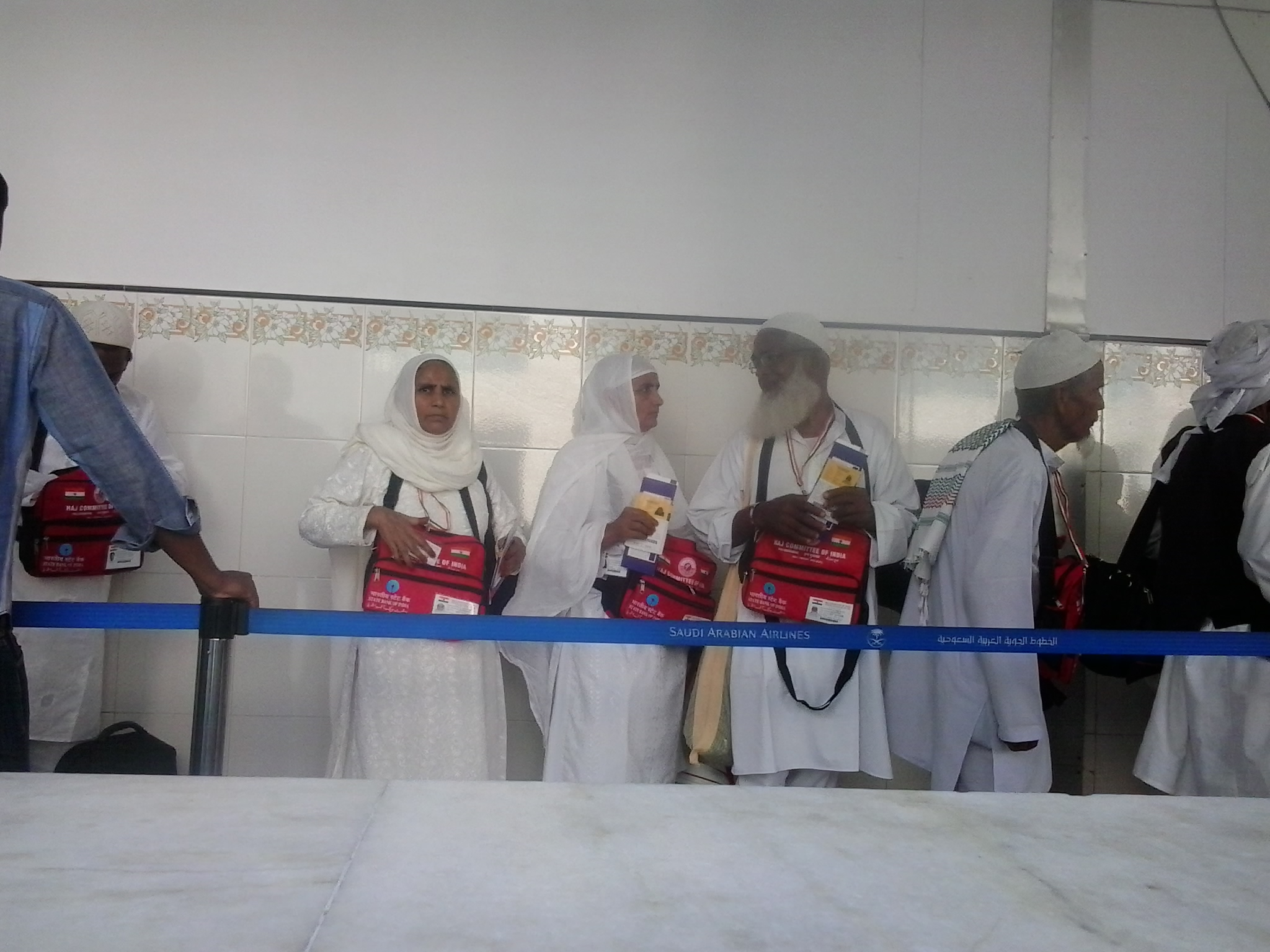
People leaving for haj from the Haj House

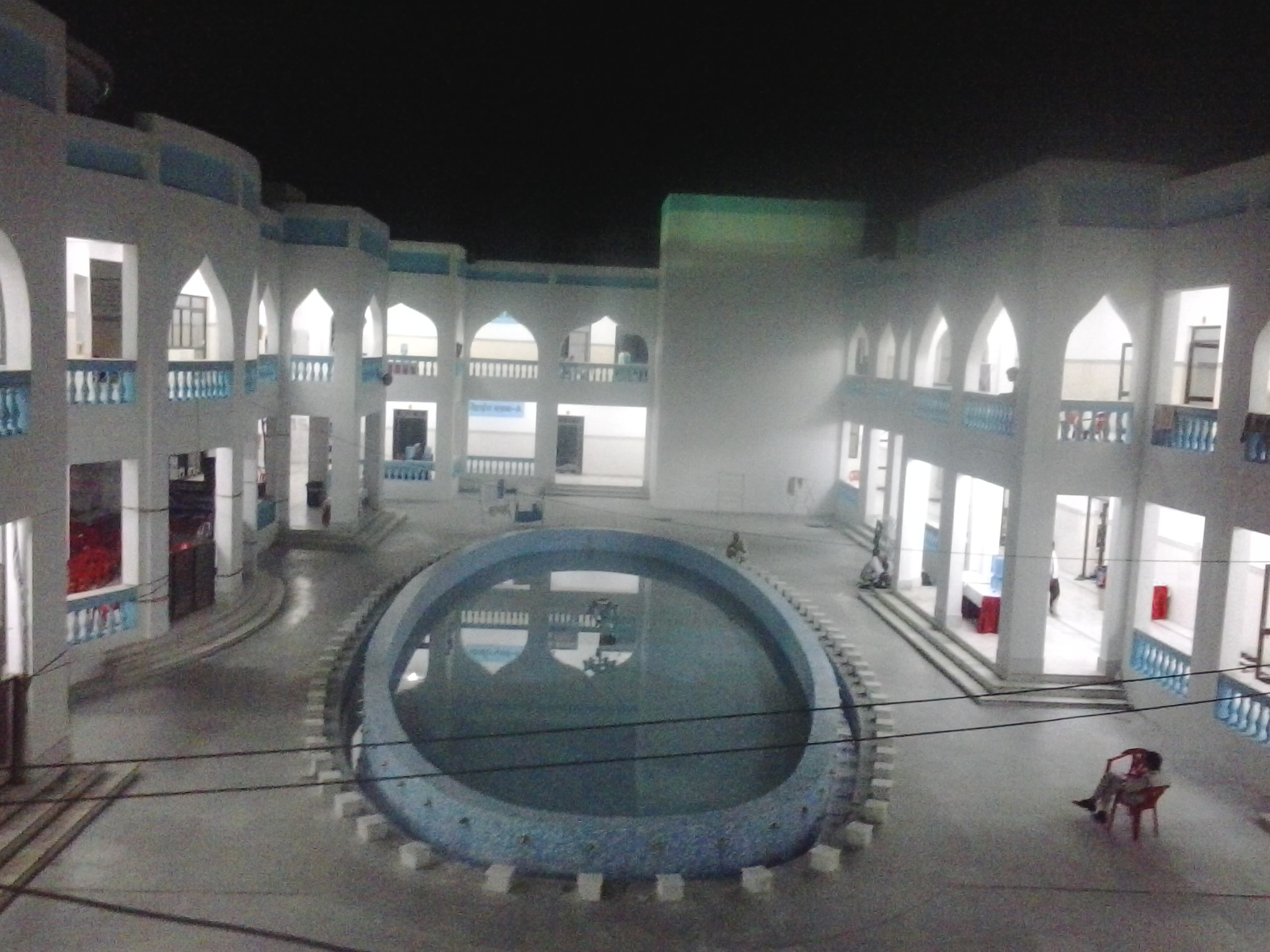
Inside the Haj House

== See also ==
- Haj House (Mumbai)
