= Play House (Mumbai) =

Play House is an area located in Grant Road, Mumbai

Play House Pila House
- Neighbourhood in Mumbai
- Play House
- Location in Mumbai, India
- Coordinates: 18.961810°N 72.823091°E
- Country: India
- State: Maharashtra
- Metro: Mumbai
- Established: 1857

Government
  - Type: Municipal Corporation
  - Body: BMC
- Elevation: 4 m (13 ft)

Languages
  - Official: Marathi
- Time zone: UTC+5:30 (IST)
- Postal code: 400008
- Vehicle registration: MH-01

Play House or Pila House is a locality in the Eastern part of Grant Road area, in South Mumbai, India. It was developed as an entertainment district by the British in 1857. Many famous theatres (some now defunct) are present in this locality. It was surrounded by the red light area of Kamathipura on one side, and the Congress House, occupied by traditional dancers and musicians such as the tawaifs on the other side.

== Overview ==
Pila House or Play House, as the British dubbed this area, bordering Kamathipura due to the many theatres (play-houses) in this locality. Today, most of the theatres have been destroyed or converted to another use.

It was named as Play House by the British but the locals could not pronounce it well and started calling the area as Pila House or Pila Haus.

== Prostitution ==
As Play House was surrounded by red-light districts, prostitution spilled into the Play House area as well. The area meant to be an "entertainment district" turned into a mini red-light area. Mainly Nepali sex workers gave prostitution services in Play House. Most of their customers were labourers and workers on daily wages. New-York based author Suketu Mehta in his book 'Maximum City : Bombay lost and found' describes it as "The men who go there are labourers, cart pullers, coolies: men who work with their bodies all day long and, in the night, buy another working body."

However, the sex-workers and brothels in Play House had the same fate as those in Kamathipura. Due to interest of many builders for redevelopment of the area, sex-work has mostly stopped in the area.

== Theatres ==
Play House was an entertainment hub of the city that staged Parsi plays and Marathi tamashas.

The British shut down all the graveyards in the area and built many theatres (play-houses). Many of these theaters, over a century old, now show classic Hindi films or adult movies, catering to migrant labourers and low-income sex workers from the nearby red-light district, i.e. Kamathipura.

The theatres such as Gulshan Talkies, Alfred Talkies, New Roshan Talkies, Nishat Talkies, Super Cinema, Royal Cinema once were an integral part of the area. These theatres once had a variety of entertainment from Parsee theatre to Silent theatre to Talkies to plays. But now, most of them have shifted to screening adult C/B grade movies. For example, Alfred Talkies, originally known as Rippon Theatre established in the year 1880 now screens adult C/B grade movies and old blockbuster Hindi films. The New Roshan Talkies, initially known as Elphistone Theatre, established in the early 1930s screened mainly adult movies and the old Hindi films for survival. However, it could not sustain and had to shut down. Similarly, Gulshan Cinema could not sustain despite the dirt-cheap prices and screening of Bhojpuri and Adult C/B grade movies due to the intense competition and had to shut down as well. The Royal Cinema / Talkies, established in the year 1911 opened up mainly for short plays and documentaries. Unlike other talkies/theatres in Play House, Royal Cinema has a small audience capacity. In the year 1930, the cinema started screening big commercial movies for better business opportunities. However, now the Royal Cinema mainly screens Bhojpuri and adult C/B grade movies. The Nishat Talkies, located right opposite to the Royal Cinema, was established in the year 1952. Nowadays, it screens Bhojpuri movies and old Hindi movies. The Super Cinema / Talkies / Super Plaza Cinema, established in the late 1920s began with short-plays. Now, it only screens Bhojpuri movies. It is also one of the few theatres still doing well in Play House and not on the verge of shutting down.

== Connectivity ==
Play House is well connected to most parts of South Mumbai.

Indian Railways :

Play House is located at a distance of 750m from the Grant Road railway station.

Play House is located at a distance of 2 kilometers from the Sandhurst Road railway station.

It is located at a distance of 1.5 kilometers from the important sub-urban and terminal railway station of Mumbai Central.

It is located at a distance of 2.7 kilometers from the Byculla railway station.

All these stations are at a walkable distance, however, taxis are still available if one does not wish to walk.

Brihanmumbai Electric Supply and Transport (B.E.S.T.) :

The 'Play House' bus-stop caters to the Play House area. Several buses go through the Play House bus-stop. The List of buses stopping at the Play House bus-stop and their routes are as follows :

• A-102 : From Vijay Vallabh Chowk (Pydhonie) to Grant Road railway station and vice versa.

• A-104 : From Vijay Vallabh Chowk (Pydhonie) to J. Mehta Marg (Malabar Hill) and vice versa.

• A-105 : From Vijay Vallabh Chowk (Pydhonie) to Kamla Nehru Park and vice versa.

• A-135 : From Ferry Wharf to J. Mehta Marg (Malabar Hill) and vice versa.

B.E.S.T. directly connects Play House to important localities such as the Grant Road railway station, Sandhurst Road railway station, Dockyard Road railway station, Pydhonie, Malabar Hill, Walkeshwar, Girgaon Chowpatty, Nana Chowk, August Kranti Maidan, Bhendi Bazaar, Mazgaon, Tardeo, etc.

Mumbai Metro :

Play House is located at a distance of 700m from the Grant Road metro station on the Line 3 (Aqua Line) of the Mumbai Metro.

It is located at a distance of 1.6 kilometers from the Mumbai Central metro station on the Line 3 (Aqua Line) of the Mumbai Metro.

It is located at a distance of 1.7 kilometers from the Girgaon metro station on the Line 3 (Aqua Line) of the Mumbai Metro.

State Transport Buses :

Play House is located at a distance of 1.5 kilometers from the Mumbai Central State Transport or Maharashtra State Road Transport Corporation Bus Depot.

== In popular culture ==
The movie Dukaan : Pila House directed by Indian film-maker Iqbal Durrani, released on 21 May 2004 in India, starring actors and actresses such as Rati Agnihotri, Vikas Kalantri, Rambha, Salim Ghouse, Shahbaaz Khan, Nawab Shah, Mukesh Tiwari, Deepshikha Nagpal and more showed the story of a young woman living in Mumbai's Pila House / Play House area, an area infamous for prostitution. The film explores her journey through the hardships, exploitation, and stigma associated with her life as a sex worker.

== See also ==
- Sex work
- Prostitution
- Prostitution in Mumbai
- Prostitution in India
- Kamathipura
- Sonagachi
- Arab Lane
- List of cinemas in Mumbai
