= Hancock Bridge =

Hancock Bridge may refer to:

- Hancock Bridge (Delaware River)
- Hancock Bridge, Mumbai
- Hancock's Bridge, New Jersey
