= Umarkhadi Assembly constituency =

Constituency of the Maharashtra legislative assembly in India

Umarkhadi
- Former constituency for the Maharashtra Legislative Assembly

Constituency details
- Country: India
- Region: Western India
- State: Maharashtra
- Lok Sabha constituency: Mumbai South
- Established: 1967
- Abolished: 2008

Umarkhadi was one of the 288 assembly constituencies of Maharashtra, a western state of India. Umarkhadi was also part of Mumbai South Lok Sabha constituency. Umarkhadi existed till 2004 elections, which was later merged with Mumbadevi Assembly constituency in 2008.

== Member of Legislative Assembly ==
Year	Member	Party
1967	G. M. Banatwala	Independent politician
1972	G. M. Banatwala	All-India Muslim League
1978	Abdul Kader Ibrahim Chorwadwalla	Janata Party
1980	Mohammad Amin Khandwani	Indian National Congress (I)
1985	Chandrika P. Kenia (Jain)	Indian National Congress
1990	Bashir Moosa Patel	All-India Muslim League
1995	Bashir Moosa Patel	Samajwadi Party
1999	Bashir Moosa Patel	Samajwadi Party
2004	Bashir Moosa Patel	Nationalist Congress Party

== Election results ==
=== Assembly Election 2004 ===
2004 Maharashtra Legislative Assembly election : Umarkhadi
Party	Candidate	Votes	%	±%
NCP	Bashir Moosa Patel	25,180	61.05%	New
SS	Oza Sharda Sohanlal	8,767	21.25%	▼5.43
SP	Dr. Mohammied Khalil Memon	5,450	13.21%	▼25.37
BSP	Sikwani Sabira Aslam	1,310	3.18%	New
Independent	Mohammed Rafiq Shaikh	363	0.88%	New
Margin of victory		16,413	39.79%	▲35.95
Turnout		41,248	39.80%	▲1.21
Total valid votes		41,248		
Registered electors		103,636		▼14.20
NCP gain from SP		Swing	▲22.47	

=== Assembly Election 1999 ===
1999 Maharashtra Legislative Assembly election : Umarkhadi
Party	Candidate	Votes	%	±%
SP	Bashir Moosa Patel	17,980	38.58%	▲4.48
INC	Abdullah Shahadat	16,192	34.74%	▲20.96
SS	Hemant Krishna Koli	12,435	26.68%	▼4.80
Margin of victory		1,788	3.84%	▲1.22
Turnout		46,609	38.59%	▼14.69
Total valid votes		46,607		
Registered electors		120,784		▲4.73
SP hold		Swing	▲4.48	

=== Assembly Election 1995 ===
1995 Maharashtra Legislative Assembly election : Umarkhadi
Party	Candidate	Votes	%	±%
SP	Bashir Moosa Patel	20,950	34.10%	New
SS	Hemant Krishna Koli	19,344	31.48%	▼0.16
INC	Amina Sayed Mohammed	8,469	13.78%	▼1.36
AIML	Abrahani Yusuf	8,067	13.13%	▼35.80
JD	Ibrahim A. K. Motiwala	1,530	2.49%	▼1.14
Independent	Abdullah Shahadat	1,088	1.77%	New
Independent	Nishakant Govind Tarkar	663	1.08%	New
Margin of victory		1,606	2.61%	▼14.67
Turnout		62,435	54.14%	▼2.73
Total valid votes		61,444		
Registered electors		115,328		▼9.42
SP gain from AIML		Swing	▼14.83	

=== Assembly Election 1990 ===
1990 Maharashtra Legislative Assembly election : Umarkhadi
Party	Candidate	Votes	%	±%
AIML	Bashir Moosa Patel	34,886	48.92%	New
SS	Jawkar Satyawan Ganpat	22,561	31.64%	New
INC	Abdullah Shahadat	10,799	15.14%	▼29.61
JD	Qureshi Khalid Latif Haji Naqvi	2,586	3.63%	New
Margin of victory		12,325	17.28%	▲2.68
Turnout		72,310	56.79%	▲21.85
Total valid votes		71,306		
Registered electors		127,319		▲7.06
AIML gain from INC		Swing	▲4.17	

=== Assembly Election 1985 ===
1985 Maharashtra Legislative Assembly election : Umarkhadi
Party	Candidate	Votes	%	±%
INC	Chandrika P. Kenia	18,176	44.75%	New
Independent	Chorwadwalla Abdul Kader Ibrahim	12,244	30.15%	New
JP	Chimbulkar Rajaram Krishna	7,644	18.82%	New
Independent	Mohammed Yousuf Suleman	1,851	4.56%	New
Margin of victory		5,932	14.61%	▼1.77
Turnout		41,079	34.54%	▲6.64
Total valid votes		40,614		
Registered electors		118,925		▼0.78
INC gain from INC(I)		Swing	▼1.61	

=== Assembly Election 1980 ===
1980 Maharashtra Legislative Assembly election : Umarkhadi
Party	Candidate	Votes	%	±%
INC(I)	Khandwani Mohammad Amin	15,290	46.37%	▲36.67
BJP	Mistri Shantilal Poptalal	9,889	29.99%	New
AIML	Faruki Abdul Bari Naimull	7,034	21.33%	▼14.70
Independent	Shikari Fakruddin Kubin Husen	612	1.86%	New
Margin of victory		5,401	16.38%	▲10.95
Turnout		33,434	27.89%	▼24.19
Total valid votes		32,977		
Registered electors		119,860		▼1.89
INC(I) gain from JP		Swing	▲4.91	

=== Assembly Election 1978 ===
1978 Maharashtra Legislative Assembly election : Umarkhadi
Party	Candidate	Votes	%	±%
JP	Chorwadwalla Abdul Kader Ibrahim	26,191	41.46%	New
AIML	Zaidi Syed Mahammad	22,759	36.03%	▼15.91
SS	Madukar Haribhau Durage	7,089	11.22%	New
INC(I)	Ilyas Ahmed Azmee	6,125	9.70%	New
Independent	Padmasen Raut	833	1.32%	New
Margin of victory		3,432	5.43%	▼6.08
Turnout		64,183	52.53%	▼11.70
Total valid votes		63,173		
Registered electors		122,174		▲48.24
JP gain from AIML		Swing	▼10.47	

=== Assembly Election 1972 ===
1972 Maharashtra Legislative Assembly election : Umarkhadi
Party	Candidate	Votes	%	±%
AIML	G. M. H. Noormohamad	27,138	51.93%	New
INC	Miya Ahmed Latif	21,121	40.42%	▲5.91
INC(O)	Narayan Kakad Murlidhar	3,783	7.24%	New
Margin of victory		6,017	11.51%	▼0.71
Turnout		53,108	64.44%	▲1.39
Total valid votes		52,256		
Registered electors		82,414		▲2.74
AIML gain from Independent		Swing	▲5.19	

=== Assembly Election 1967 ===
1967 Maharashtra Legislative Assembly election : Umarkhadi
Party	Candidate	Votes	%	±%
Independent	G. M. Banatwala	23,253	46.74%	New
INC	I. K. Husain	17,169	34.51%	New
PSP	M. Kotwal	5,858	11.77%	New
SWA	A. M. Mithwani	1,943	3.91%	New
ABJS	M. S. Khan	1,528	3.07%	New
Margin of victory		6,084	12.23%	
Turnout		51,819	64.60%	
Total valid votes		49,751		
Registered electors		80,219		
Independent win (new seat)				

== See also ==
https://resultuniversity.com/election/umarkhadi-maharashtra-assembly-constituency
