= Arab Lane =

Locality in Grant Road, Mumbai

Arab Lane Arab Gully
- Neighbourhood in Mumbai
- Mohammed Tahir Ansari Marg
- Location in Mumbai, India
- Coordinates: 18.962980°N 72.823524°E
- Country: India
- State: Maharashtra
- Metro: Mumbai
- First settled by Arabs: Early 19th century
- Named for: The Arabs who used to live in Mumbai

Government
  - Type: Municipal Corporation
  - Body: BMC
- Elevation: 4 m (13 ft)

Languages
  - Official: Marathi
- Time zone: UTC+5:30 (IST)
- Postal code: 400008
- Vehicle registration: MH-01

Arab Lane is a locality/lane in Grant Road East, South Mumbai, Maharashtra, India. It is located at the junction of Kamathipura, Bapty Road and Play House.

== Overview ==
Arab Lane is the unofficial and widely used name of the lane officially called Mohammed Tahir Ansari Marg. It was the place of residence of Urdu novelist Saadat Hasan Manto from 1930s to 1940s.

== Etymology ==
The name of the lane could be linked to the Arab pearl merchants who once resided there. Another possibility is that it was named after an Arab ascetic who, about forty-five years ago, claimed to have mystical powers. This ascetic stayed in the lane, and over time, it became associated with him. He formed close ties with several prominent individuals, one of whom, unable to have children, placed his faith in the ascetic, who promised to help him have a family.

== Politics ==
Arab Lane belongs to the Mumbadevi constituency in the Maharashtra legislative assembly. It belongs to the Mumbai South constituency in the Lok Sabha.

== See also ==
- Arabs in India
- Islam in India
- Play House (Mumbai)
