= Hancock Bridge, Mumbai =

Bridge in India

- Coordinates: 18.96484°N 72.83867°E
- Crosses: Suburban railway stations of Sandhurst Road and Byculla
- Locale: Mumbai
- Official name: Hancock Bridge
- Maintained by: Municipal Corporation of Greater Mumbai

Characteristics
- Height: 4.27 metres

History
- Construction end: 1879 (Built), 1923 (Rebuilt)
- Closed: 18 November 2015

Location
- Interactive map of Hancock Bridge, Mumbai

The Hancock Bridge was a bridge in Mumbai located between the Suburban railway stations of Sandhurst Road and Byculla. The bridge was initially built in 1879 and then underwent reconstruction in 1923 before it was demolished in January 2016 for another reconstruction.

== History ==
Hancock Bridge was first built in 1879 during the British India era. It was named after Colonel H. F. Hancock, who served as member and President of the then Bombay Municipal Corporation (presently the Municipal Corporation of Greater Mumbai) during that period. The bridge was then rebuilt in 1923.

After demolition in 2016, Hancock Bridge will again be rebuilt by the MCGM while preserving some of its old structures.

== Demolition ==
The demolition plan had been on papers since 2014 as the bridge had become weak and thus limited traffic was permitted. Demolition was also planned in order to facilitate the conversion of the railway electrification along the Central Line of the Mumbai Suburban railway from 1,500-volt DC to 25,000-volt AC which requires a minimum distance of 21 centimetres (8.3 in) between the roof of the train and the base of a bridge. The Municipal Corporation of Greater Mumbai (MCGM) and Central Railway at the same time stated their intentions to preserve old structures and thus the demolition and reconstruction was being planned accordingly. In 2014, it was confirmed that MCGM would pay for the demolition and reconstruction. Demolition of the Hancock Bridge began in November 2015 and the bridge has been closed for pedestrian traffic since then.
