= Umarkhadi =

Village in Maharashtra

Coordinates: 18°57′40″N 72°50′08″E

Umarkhadi is a historic neighborhood located in South Mumbai, Maharashtra, India.

It is situated near Byculla and Pydhone. This area is densely populated and culturally diverse. It was formerly an independent Assembly Constituency of the Maharashtra Legislative Assembly. Following a delimitation process in 2008, the constituency was abolished and merged into the Mumbadevi Assembly constituency.

The name is derived from a creek (khadi) that once separated the island of Bombay from the island of Mazagaon. The area has a children's home, named Children's Aid Society.
