= Sandhurst Road railway station =

Railway station in Mumbai, India

Sandhurst Road
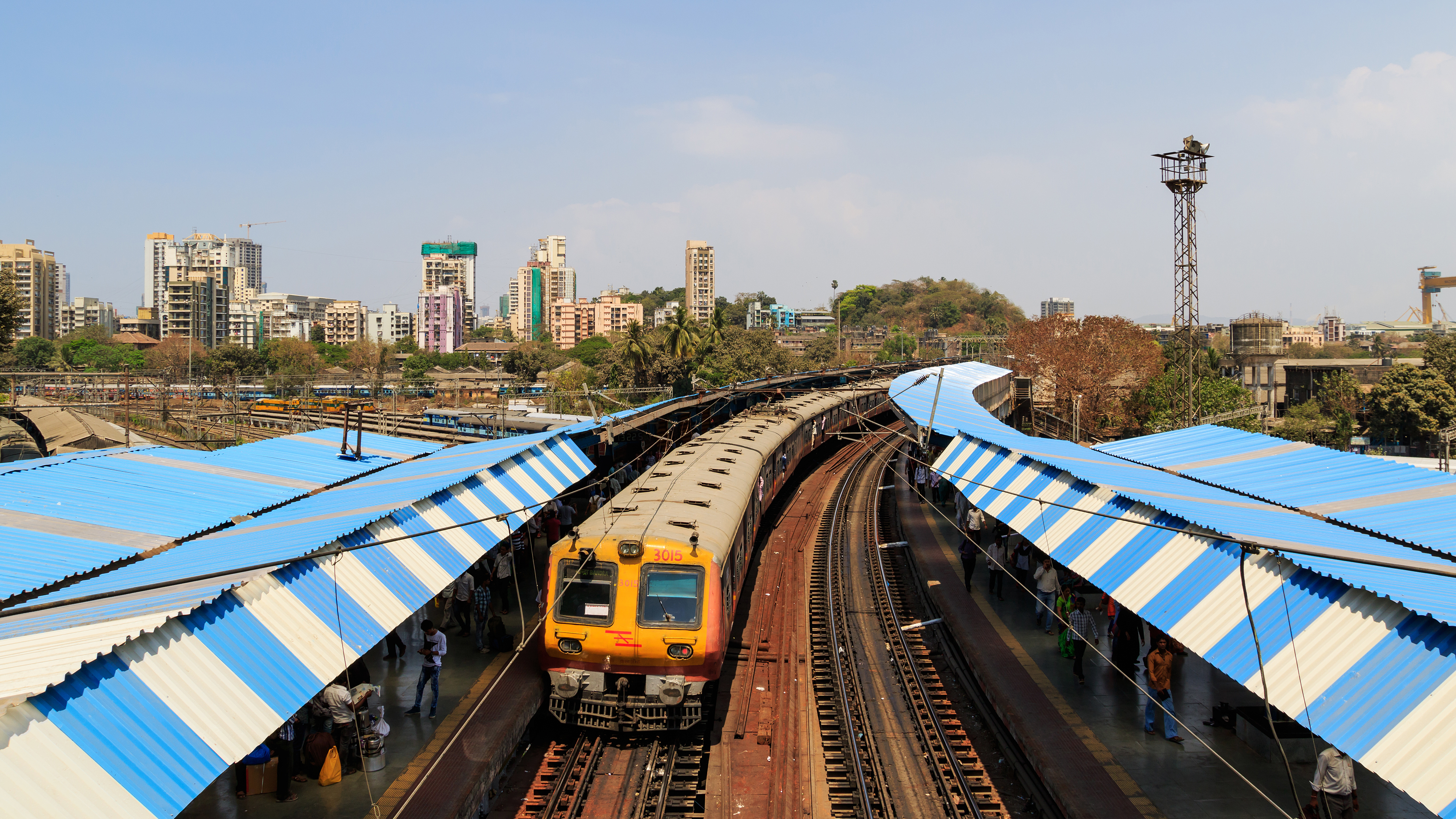

General information
- Coordinates: 18.960826°N 72.839511°E
- System: Mumbai Suburban Railway station
- Owner: Ministry of Railways, Indian Railways
- Lines: Central Line, Harbour Line
- Platforms: 4 (2 Ground Central Line + 2 Elevated Harbour Line)
- Tracks: 6

Construction
- Structure type: At Grade and Elevated
- Platform levels: Ground + Elevated

Other information
- Status: Active
- Station code: SNRD
- Fare zone: Central Railways

History
- Opened: Lower Level Stn.- 1 February 1925 Upper Level Stn.- 3 February 1925

Services
Preceding station	Mumbai Suburban Railway	Following station
Masjid towards Chhatrapati Shivaji Terminus	Central line	Byculla towards Kasara or Khopoli
Masjid towards Chhatrapati Shivaji Terminus	Harbour line	Dockyard Road towards Goregaon or Panvel
Route map
Location
- Location within Mumbai

Sandhurst Road (station code: SNRD) is a railway station serving Dongri area of South Mumbai, India, on the Central and Harbour Lines of the Mumbai Suburban Railway. It is the third stop from Chhatrapati Shivaji Maharaj Terminus.

Named after Lord Sandhurst, the Governor of Bombay between 1895 and 1900, the station was built using funds from the Bombay City Improvement Trust, which he helped raise.

== History ==
Before the Sandhurst Rd station came up, there was a station named Mazagaon railway station located north, under the base of the Hancock bridge. It was opened on 1 July 1894. It was listed as one of the nine important station within the city, by The Gazetteer of Bombay City in 1909. It served both the local population, and the Portuguese and British suburb on either side. According to old maps, dating as late as at least 1914, and as early as at least 1909, the station was located just north or at the base of today's Hancock Bridge in Mazagaon. It was closed on 31 January 1925. This was to pave way for the upcoming Sandhurst Road station, that was to be constructed to connect to the Harbour Line (during its extension to Victoria Terminus), since both the main and the Harbour line had to be served by the single two-tired station. The lower level station opened on 1 February 1925, while the upper level was opened on 3 February, the day the electrified Harbour line opened for service.

According to the book Halt Station India by author Rajendra Aklekar, that was published in 2014, the site of the former station there was the stone edge of the old station's platform hidden under the debris. Along with it, there were the remains of a stone arch, probably of a wall.

The Sandhurst Road railway station (upper level servicing the Harbour Line) was built in 1921. The supporting pillars of the edifice bear the inscription "GIPR 1921 Lutha Iron Works, Glasgow". The fabricated metal was imported from the United Kingdom. It is India's first two-tier station with a 1,728 feet (527 m) long steel viaduct weighing 2,788 tonnes (2,788,000 kg) that carries the Harbour line.

== Gallery ==
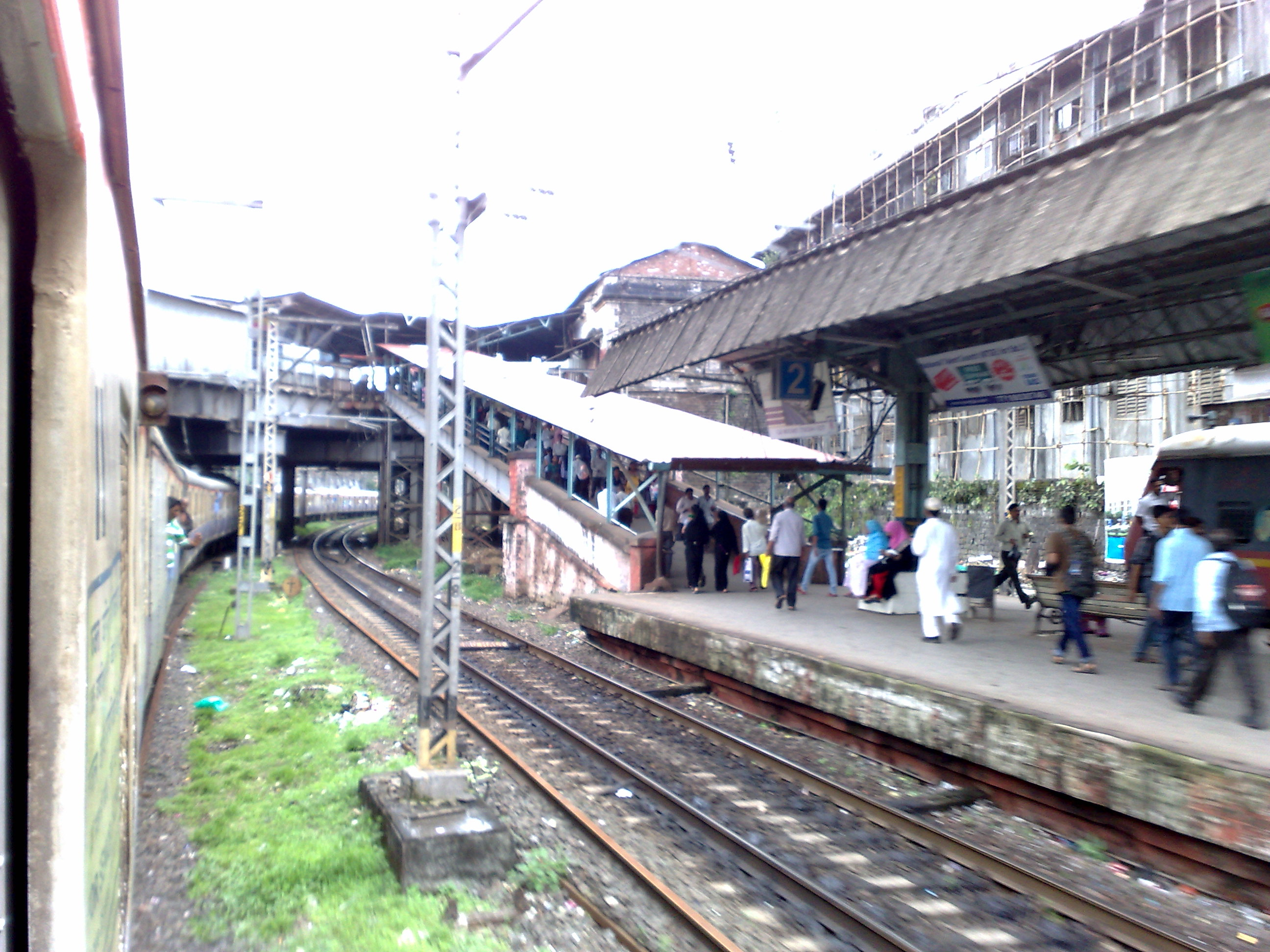
Sandhurst Road - Elevated station

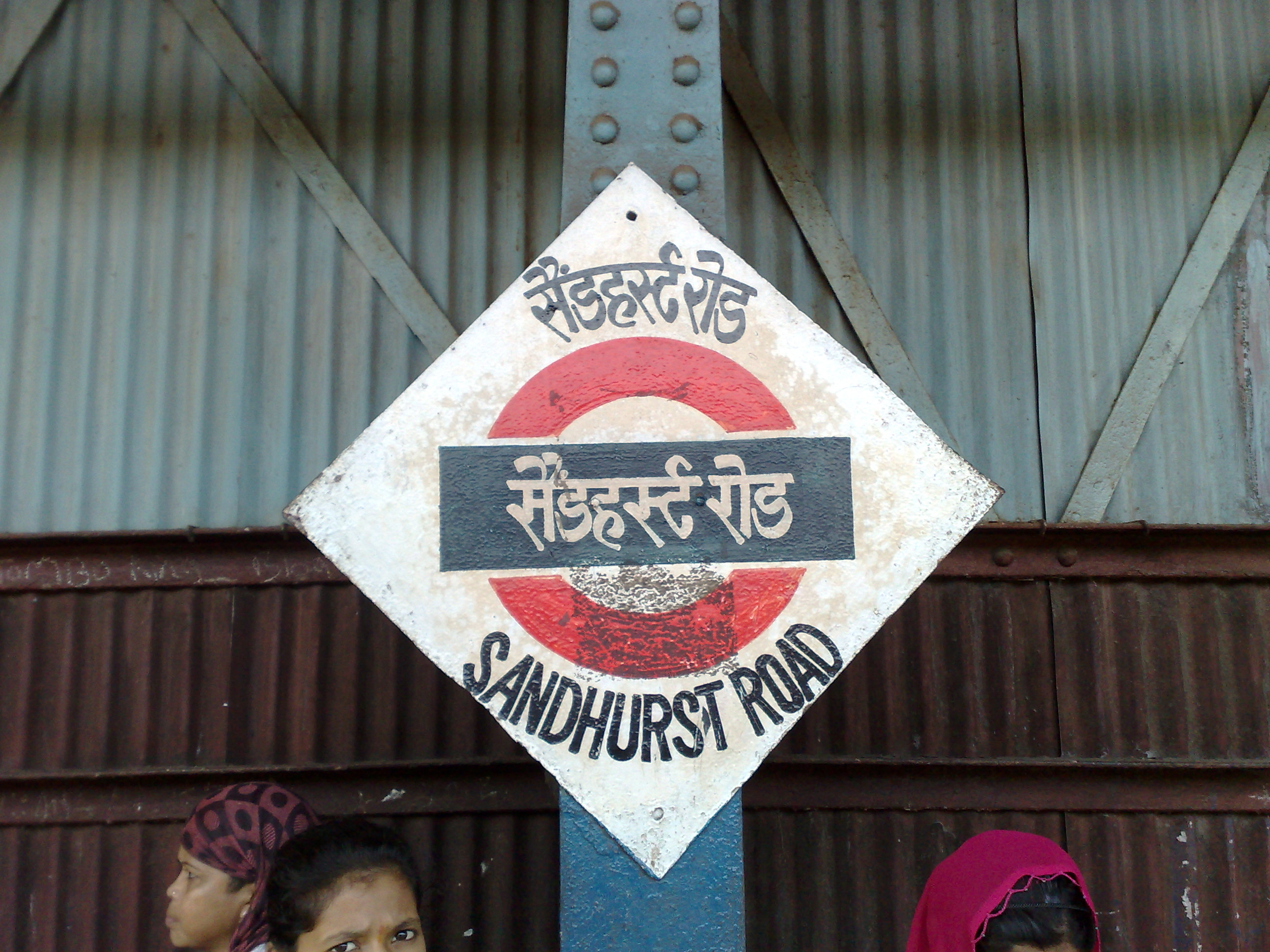
Sandhurst Road Platform board

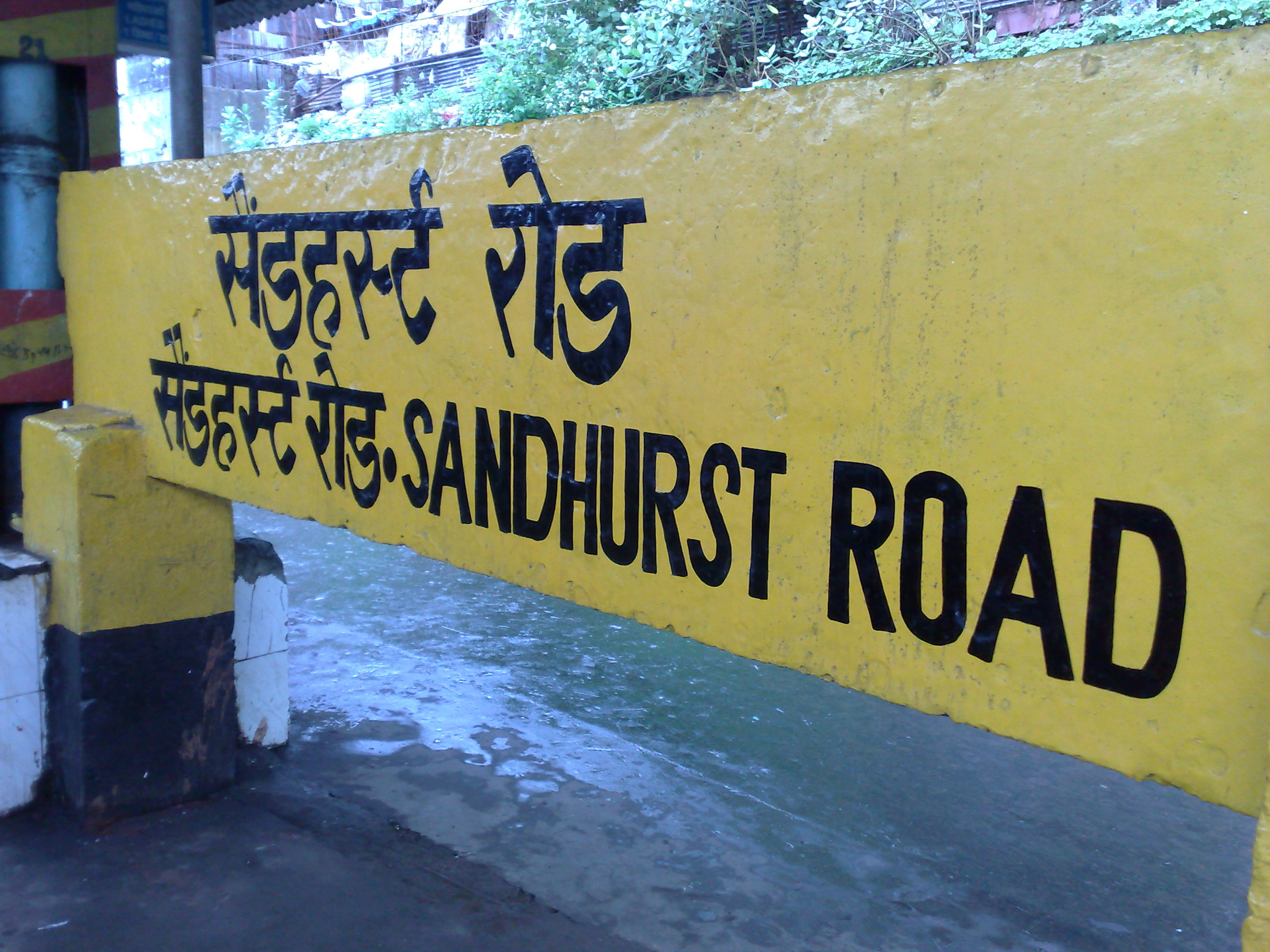
Station Board

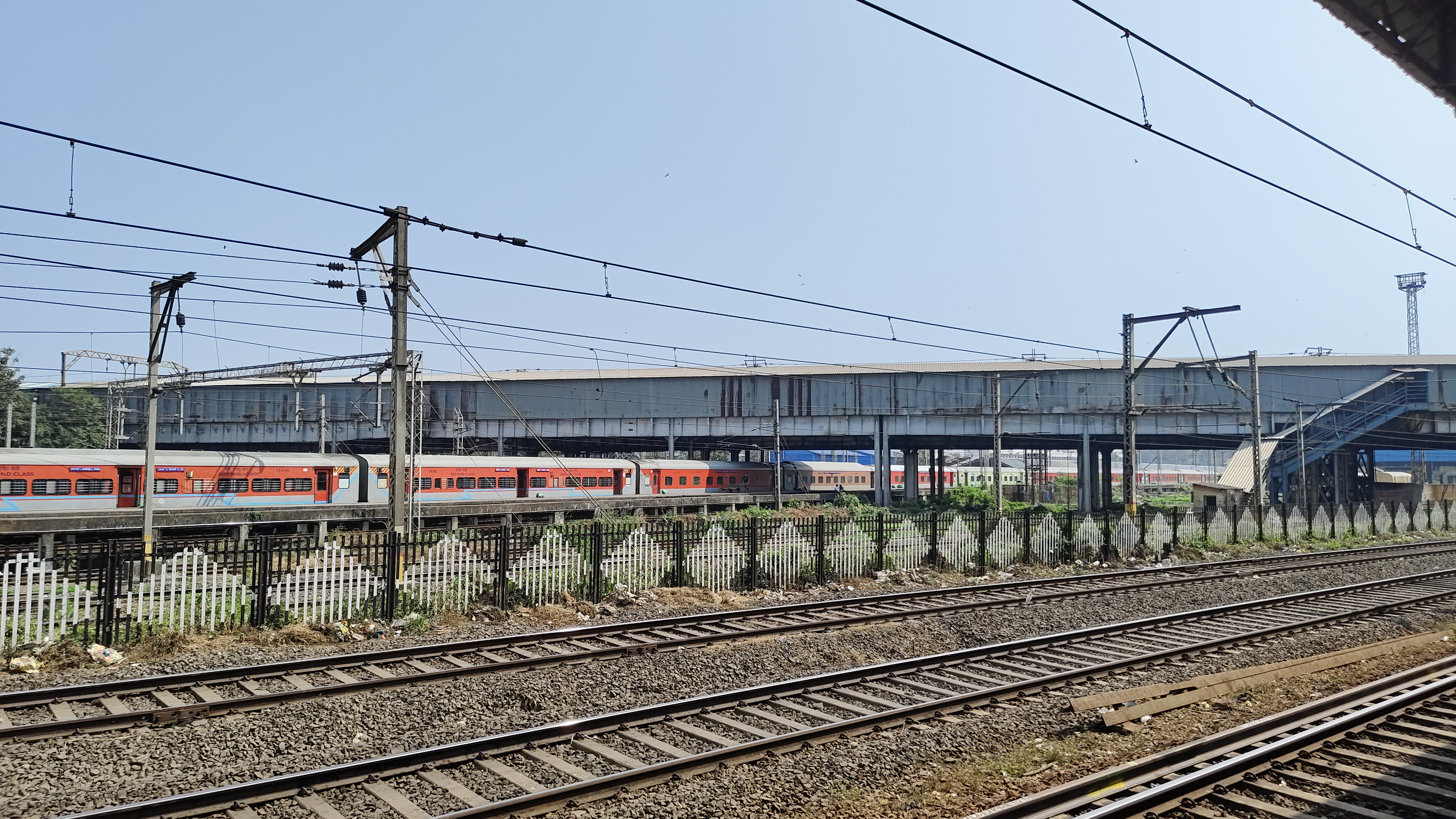
Wadi Bunder Viaduct (Upper level Sandhurst Rd station)

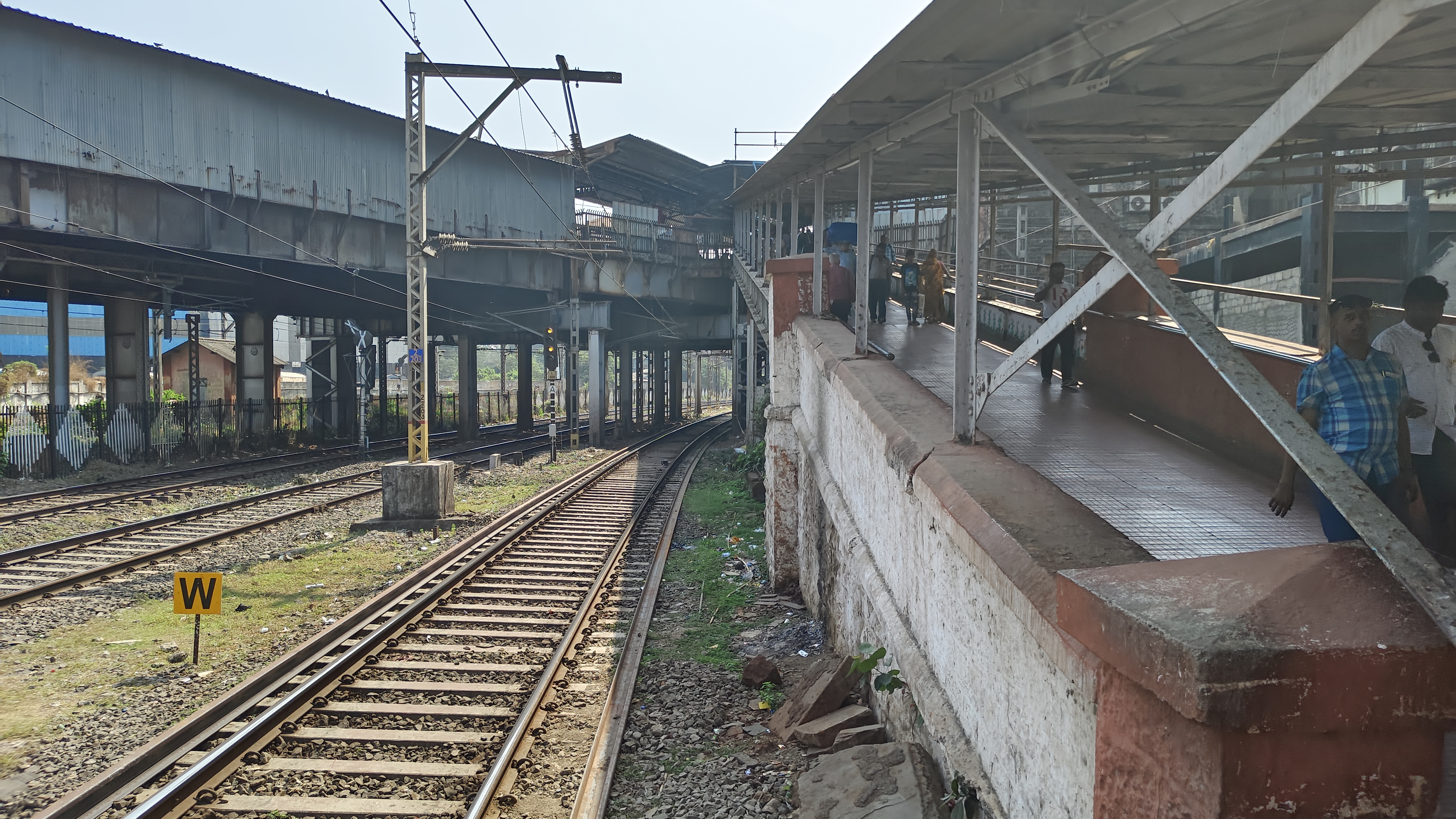
Ramp connecting the upper and lower level Sandhurst Rd stations

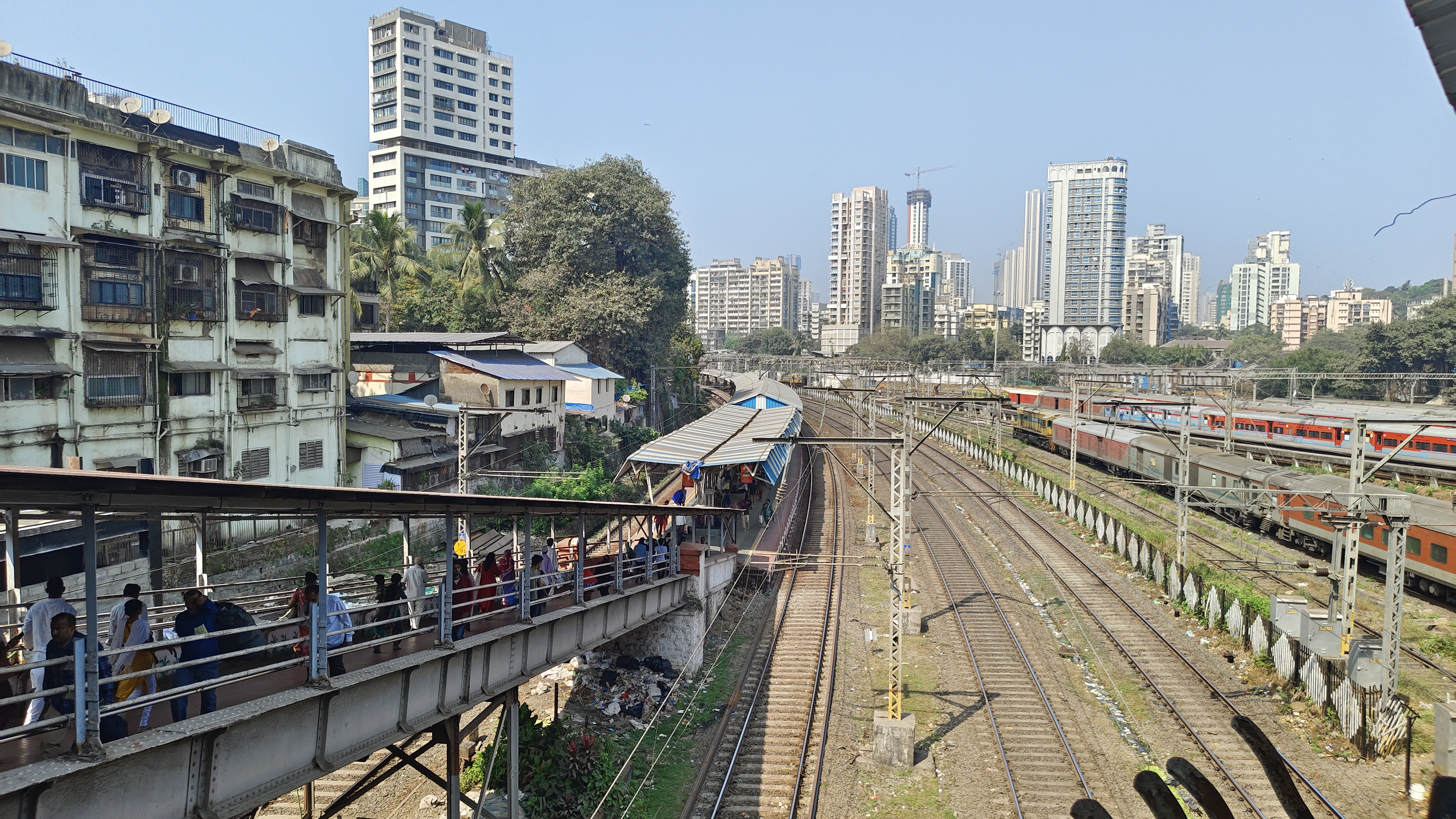
View of the Lower level Sandhurst Rd station

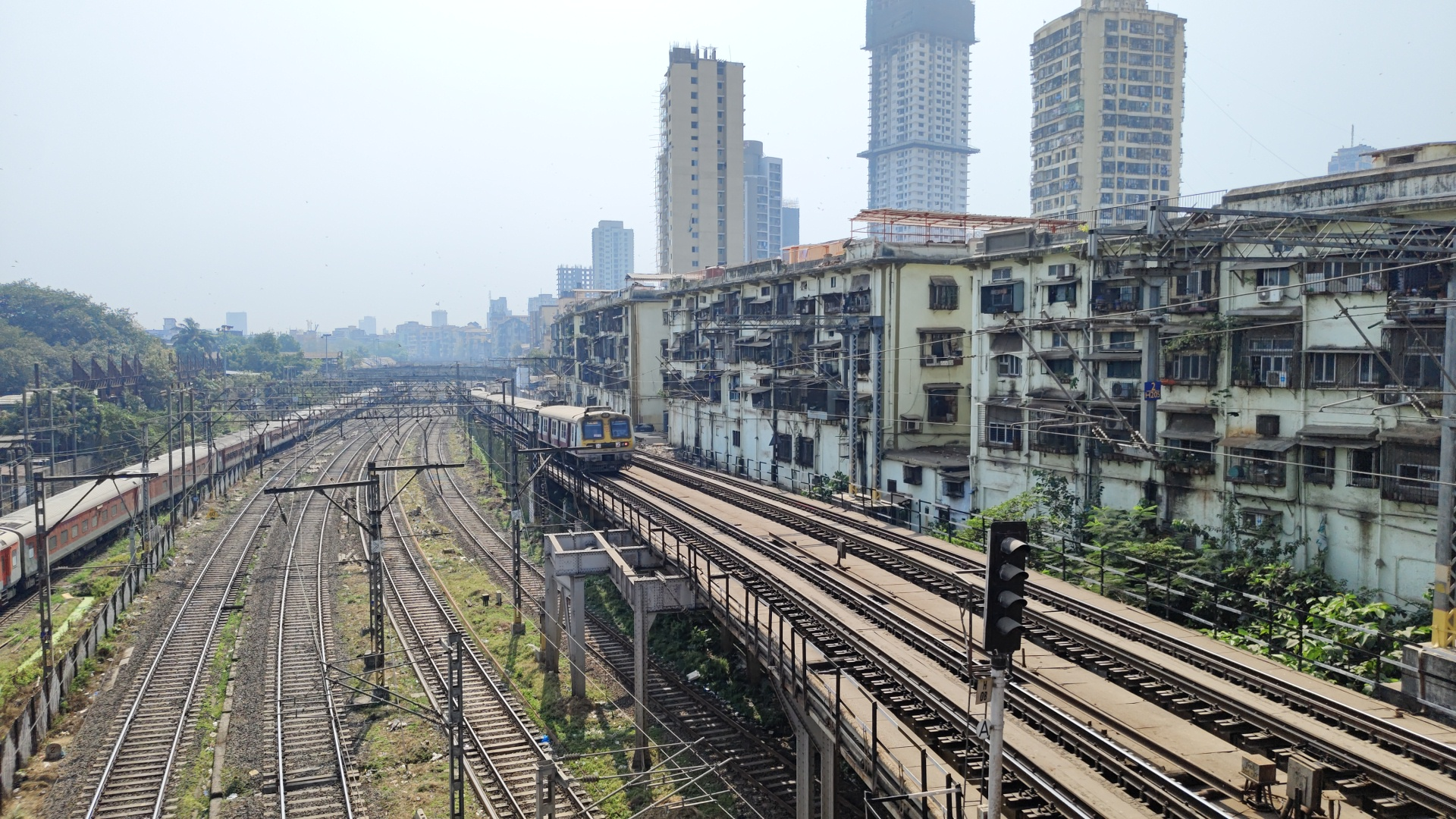
Local train moving out of the upper level station

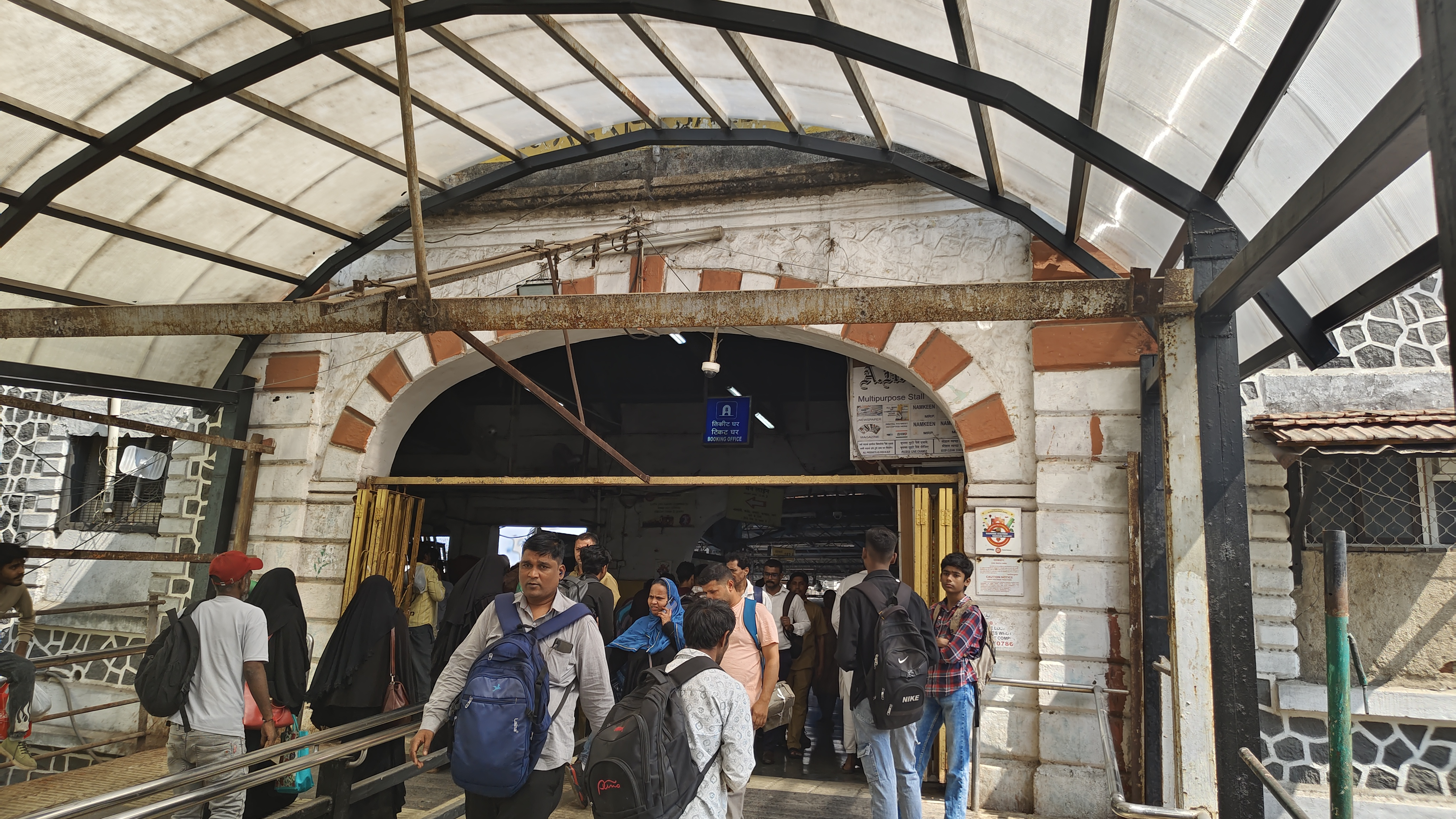
Entrance into the upper level station

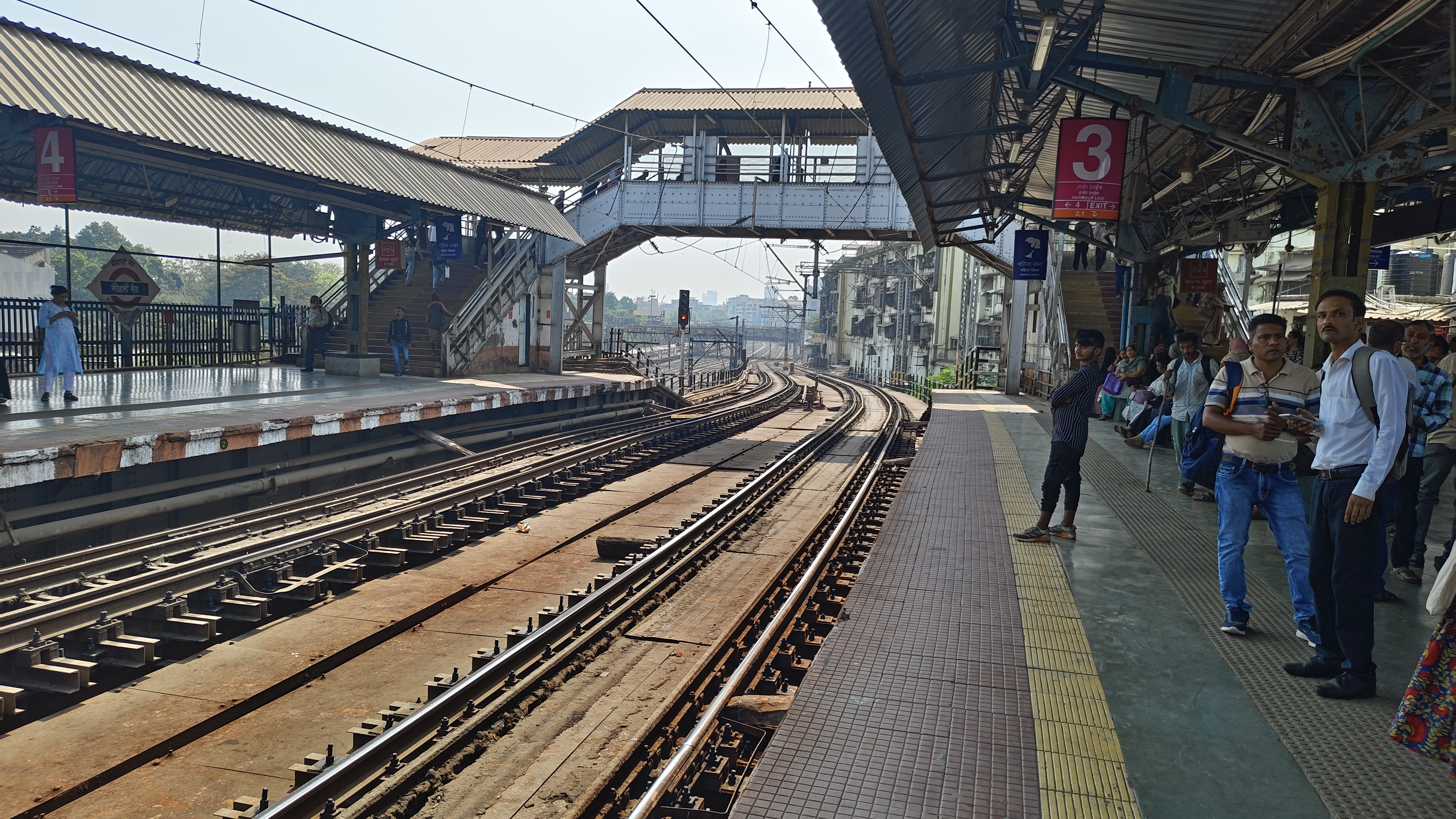
Platform view of the upper level station

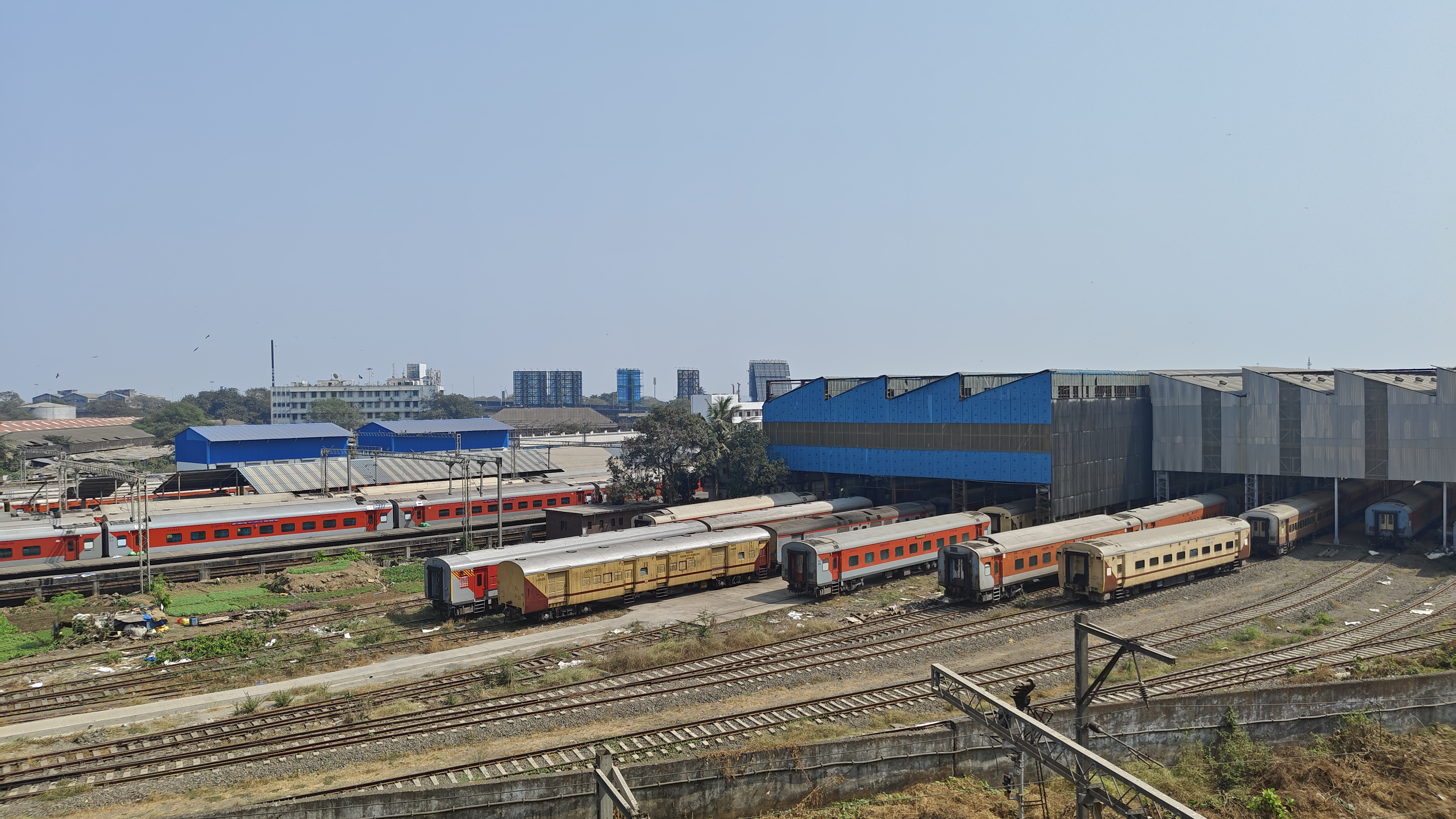
Wadi Bunder Carshed from Sandhurst Rd station

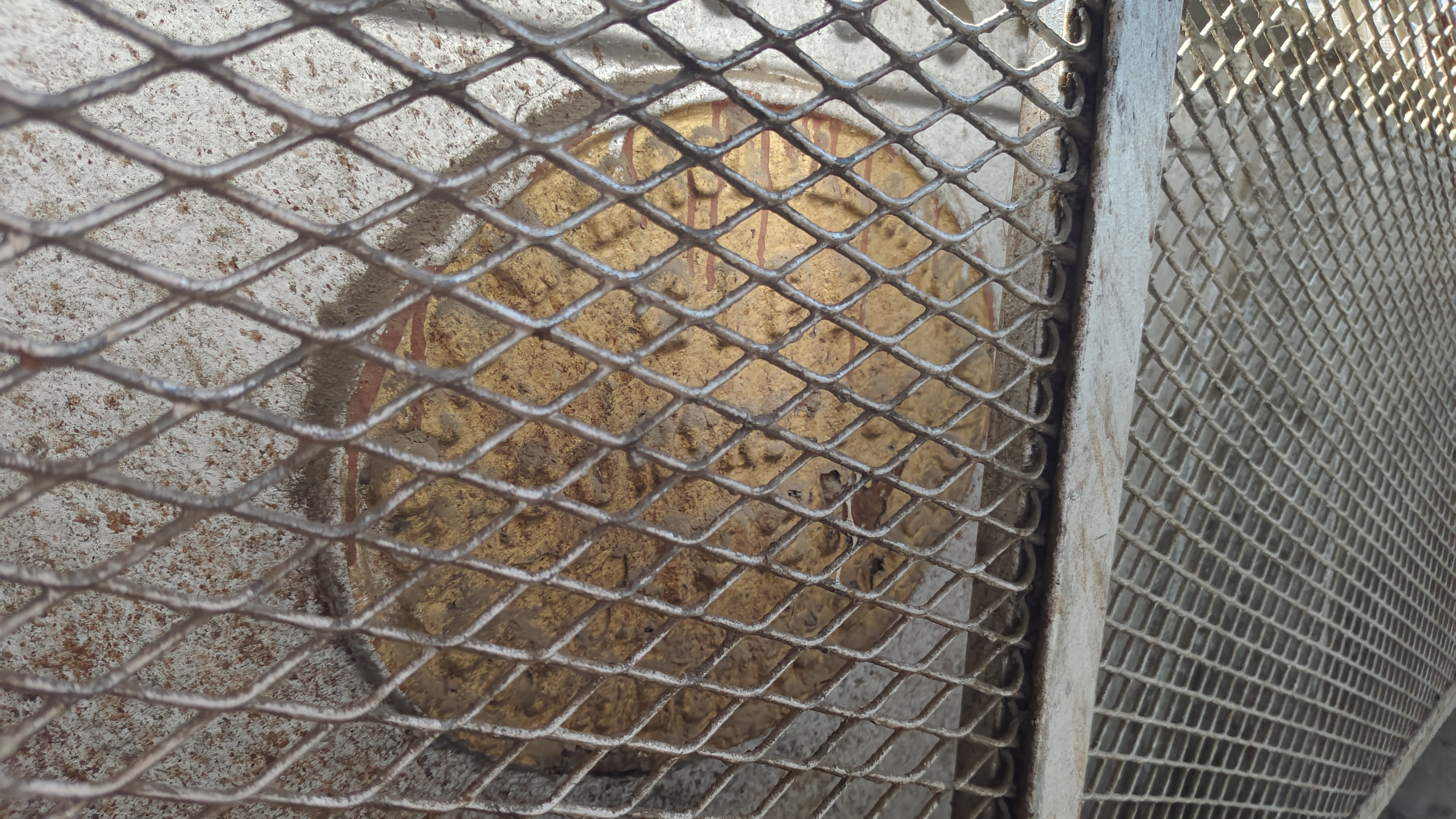
GIPR plaque on the upper level footbridge
