= Pydhonie =

- neighbourhood
- Location in Mumbai, India
- Coordinates: 18.9540°N 72.8361°E
- Country: India
- State: Maharashtra
- District: Mumbai City
- Metro: Mumbai
- Zone: 1
- Ward: B

Government
  - Body: MCGM
- Elevation: 11 m (36 ft)

Languages
  - Official: Marathi
- Time zone: UTC+5:30 (IST)
- PIN: 400 003
- Lok Sabha constituency: Mumbai South
- Vidhan Sabha constituency: Mumbadevi
- Civic agency: MCGM

Pydhonie is a neighbourhood in South Mumbai. Etymologically the name is derived from the Marathi word Py which means feet, and dhoné which means "to wash". Thus the name means "A place where feet are washed."

The name Pydhonie or "foot-wash", and probably refers to a small creek that formed at high tide between the Great Breach (separating the islands of Bombay and Worli) and Umarkhadi, the creek between the islands of Mazagaon and Mumbai (Bombay). This was probably the first land permanently reclaimed from the sea in Mumbai.

Pydhonie separates the predominantly Muslim population of the eastern part of the inner city from the mainly Hindu part to the west. The main landmark is the Mumba Devi Temple, moved here from the Fort area in 1737 or 1766. The present structure was financed by a Prabhu goldsmith called Pandurang Shivaji. Many of the older houses in this area were built by immigrants from Gujarat and Rajasthan, and have the murals on the walls, jharokhas, balconies and ornate lintels typical of architecture from these states.

The ‘1860 ’ engraved police station is the oldest in the city and has a history in the 1993 Bombay bombings, which followed the Bombay riots, wherein the "first bullet during the riots was fired near the Pydhonie station and the first bus stoning during the riots also happened in this jurisdiction," said Madhukar Zende, who was the ACP during the 1993 riots and is famous for his arrest of serial killer Charles Sobhraj.

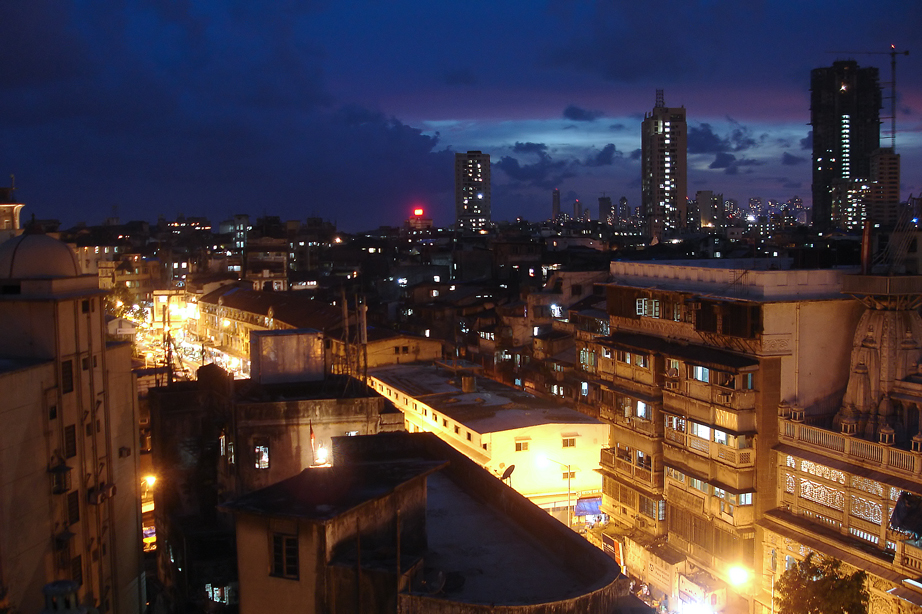
A night view of Pydhonie in 2009
