= Byculla railway station =

Railway Station in Maharashtra, India

Byculla
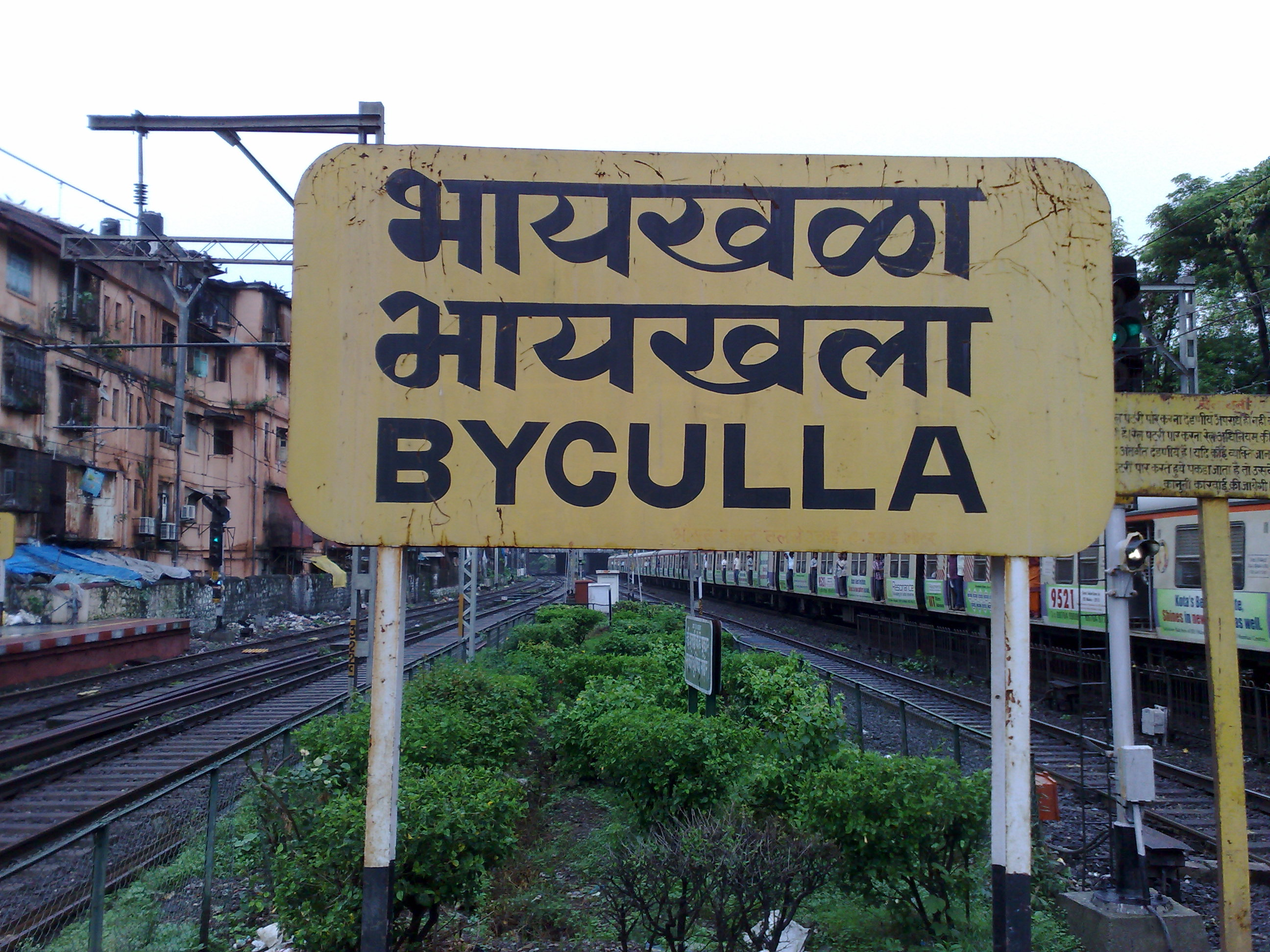
- Byculla railway station platformboard

General information
- Coordinates: 18°58′35″N 72°49′58″E
- Elevation: 4.392 metres (14.41 ft)
- System: Indian Railways and Mumbai Suburban Railway station
- Owner: Ministry of Railways, Indian Railways
- Line: Central Line

Construction
- Structure type: Standard on-ground station

Other information
- Status: Active
- Station code: BY
- Fare zone: Central Railway zone

History
- Opened: 1853
- Rebuilt: 1857, 1 July 1892

Passengers
- 2012-13: 1,32,319

Services
Preceding station	Mumbai Suburban Railway	Following station
Sandhurst Road towards Chhatrapati Shivaji Terminus	Central line	Chinchpokli towards Kasara or Khopoli
Route map
Location
- Location within India Location within Mumbai

Byculla (station code: BY) is railway station on the Central line of the Mumbai Suburban Railway. It is located in the neighbourhood of Byculla.

The station is a Grade-I heritage structure. The other 4 railway stations on Mumbai's heritage list include Chhatrapati Shivaji Maharaj Terminus, Western Railways Headquarters Building (Churchgate), Bandra railway station and Reay Road railway station.

== History ==
Byculla was one of the original stations when the Bombay–Thane railway was inaugurated in April 1853. It had been built as a wooden structure the year before, but was rebuilt in 1857 as a stone structure. It took on its current form in June 1891. The new station (current) was opened on 1 July 1892.

The original Byculla station was located about 500 m south of the current station, beside where the Byculla Mankeshwar is located today. In fact the temple was mentioned by Lady Falkland, (the wife of Bombay's then governor) in her memoir of a rail journey along the line, who stated that the temple "was on verge of completion, when the latter (railway line) was opened." The temple, which was located on the east of the former station, is also a prominent element of the station's oldest photos. Another notable part of the old photos is a bridge on the Parell Rd, on the northern side of the station.

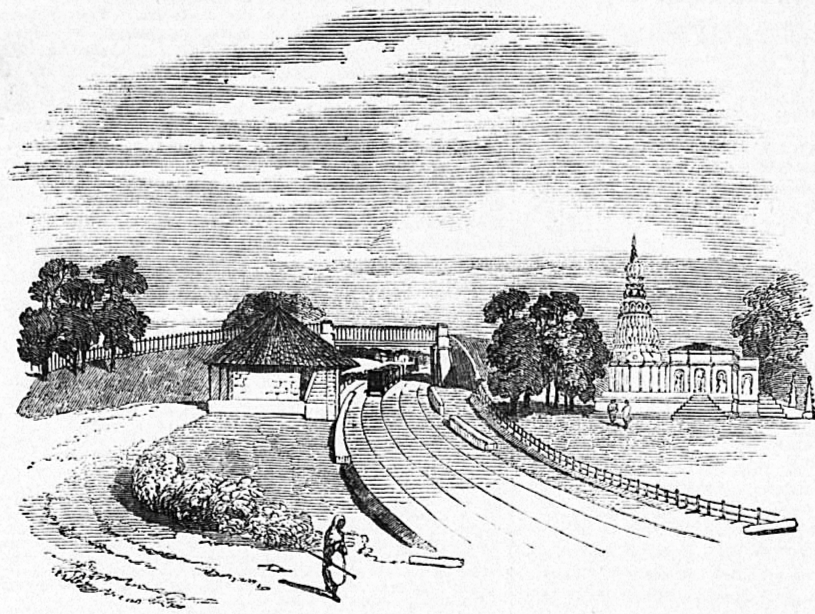
Old Byculla Station, 1853

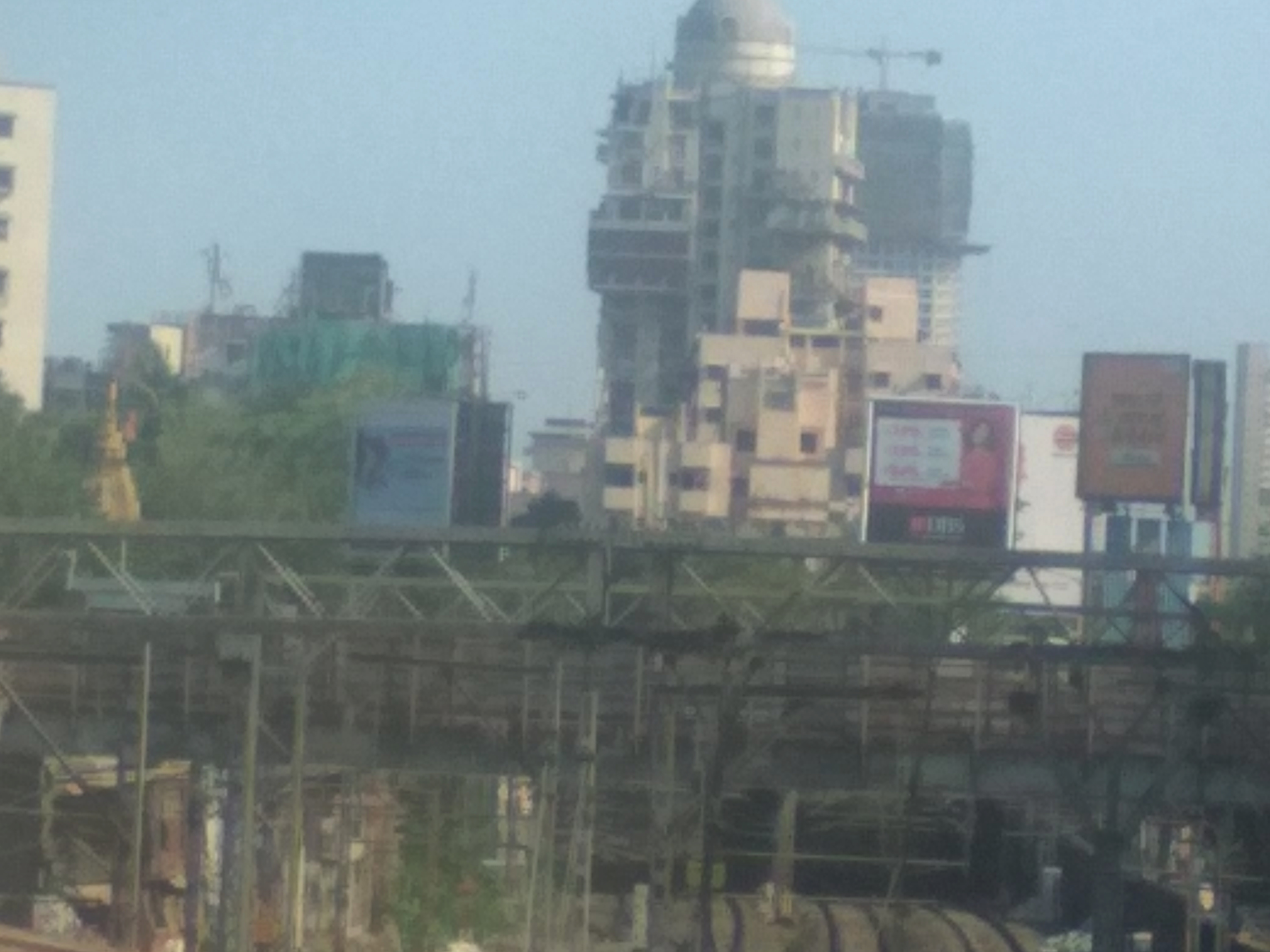
In the above image taken from the station's FoB, the Mankeshwar Temple can be seen as the yellow temple. The old Station was located west (right) of the temple.

A picture of the station from its western platform (reproduced below) was published in the book 'Lokhandi Rastyanchey Sanchipt Varnan', A translation by Krishnashastri Bhatwadekar. The photograph shows the Mankeshwar temple on the right side. The station itself was fenced on either sides. Some buildings can also be seen on the station: one on the western side, and another on the eastern; with the former more elaborately roofed. The bridge can be seen afar, also elaborately designed, with onlookers overlooking the line from above.

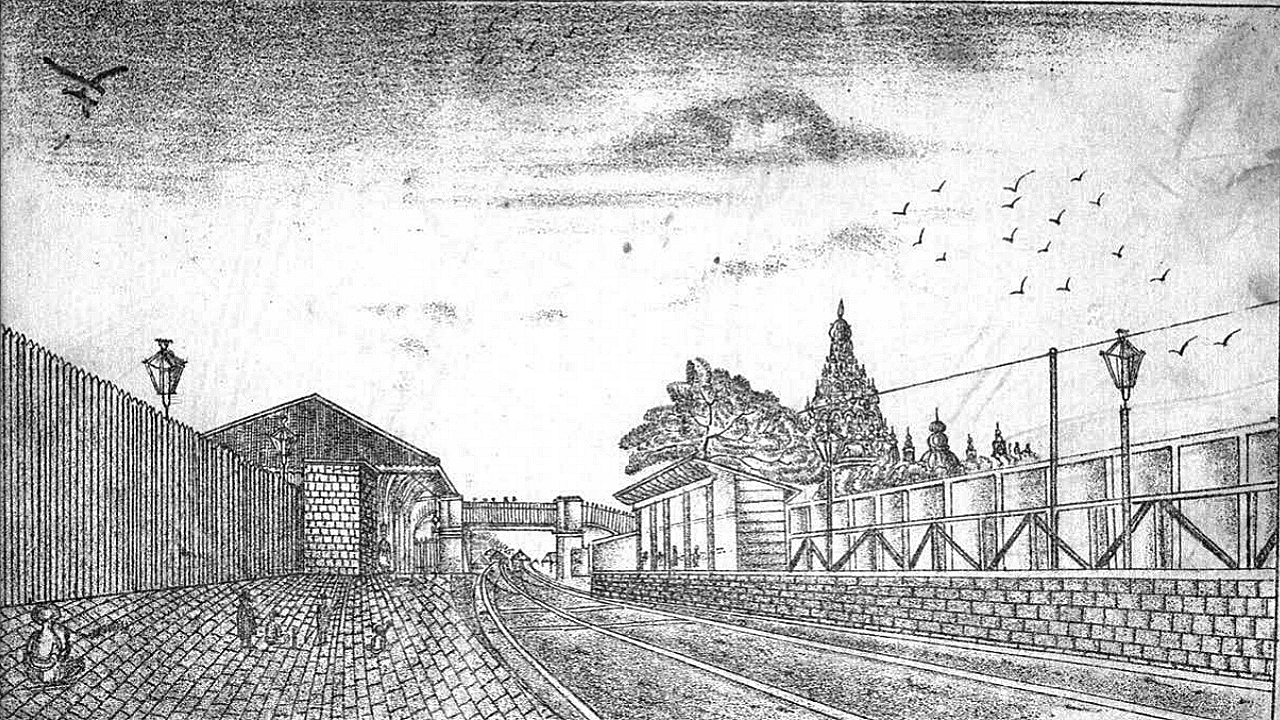
The Old Byculla station, 1854 or before.

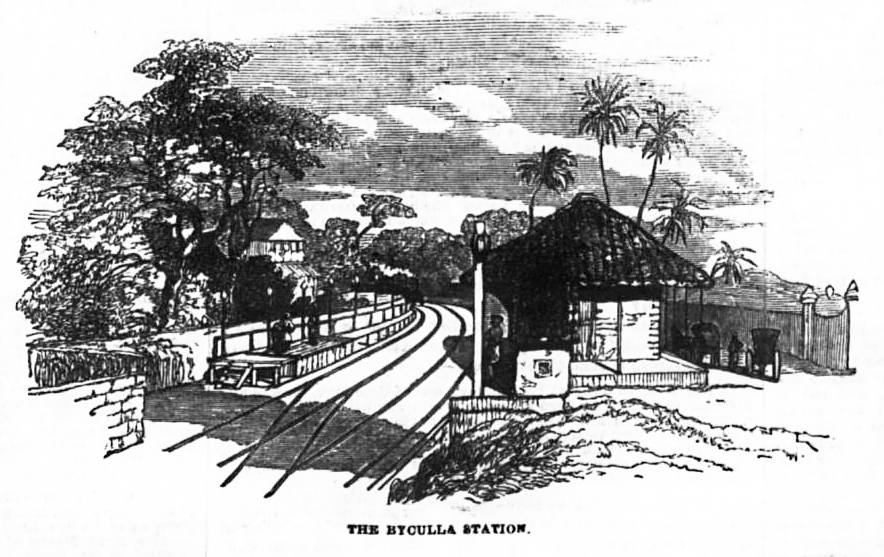
Another view of Byculla station, around the same period.

The station was still a small one. It only had two lines catering it, and didn't have many buildings along with a narrow entrance. Indeed there is an anecdote about Dr. W.C. Eccles, a surgeon of the GIP Railway regarding this element of the station. The incident goes that in 1867, while on an official visit, a shaft of his brougham broke while passing through the then Byculla station's narrow entrance. Determined to get the repairs done, free of the cost, he wrote a letter to the company's agent (general manager) on 6 March 1867, regarding the same. The agent's secretary wrote that this could not be sanctioned. This could be why today's Byculla station has a wide porch.

Nevertheless, the station was fashionable among the upper class British passengers boarded from this station, as it was more elaborate than the terminus, Bori Bunder station.

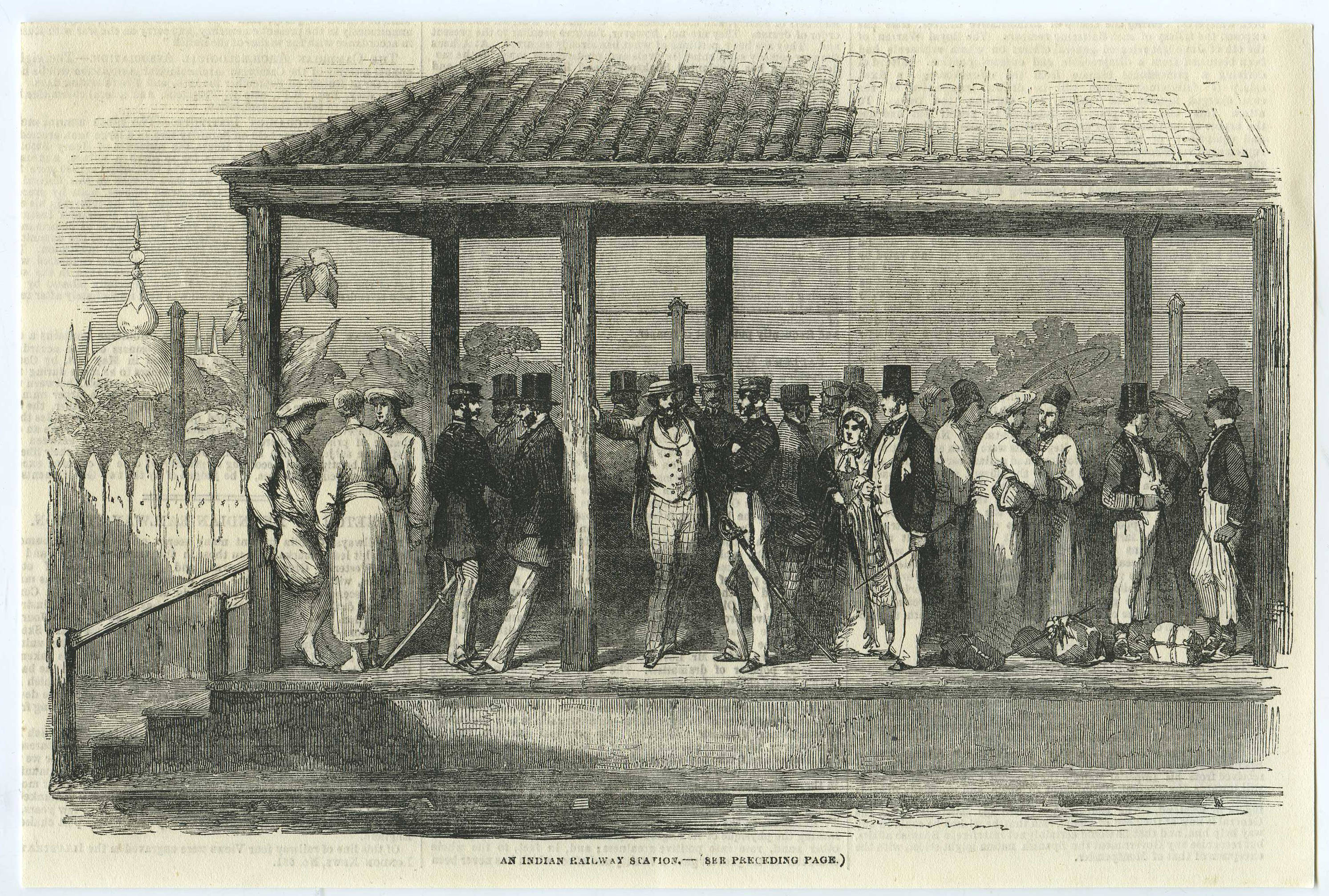
Passengers waiting at Byculla Railway Station, 1854

The original workshops

Byculla was also the location where the first workshops of GIPR were opened in 1854. The workshops were spread over 18 acres of land, with steam sheds, erecting and fitting shops, metal foundries, sawmills, carriage repairing quarters and wagon building sheds, warehouses, timber preservation cabins, offices, and dwelling spaces. The workshops were later shifted to a larger plot at Parel in the 1870s, owing to increased traffic.

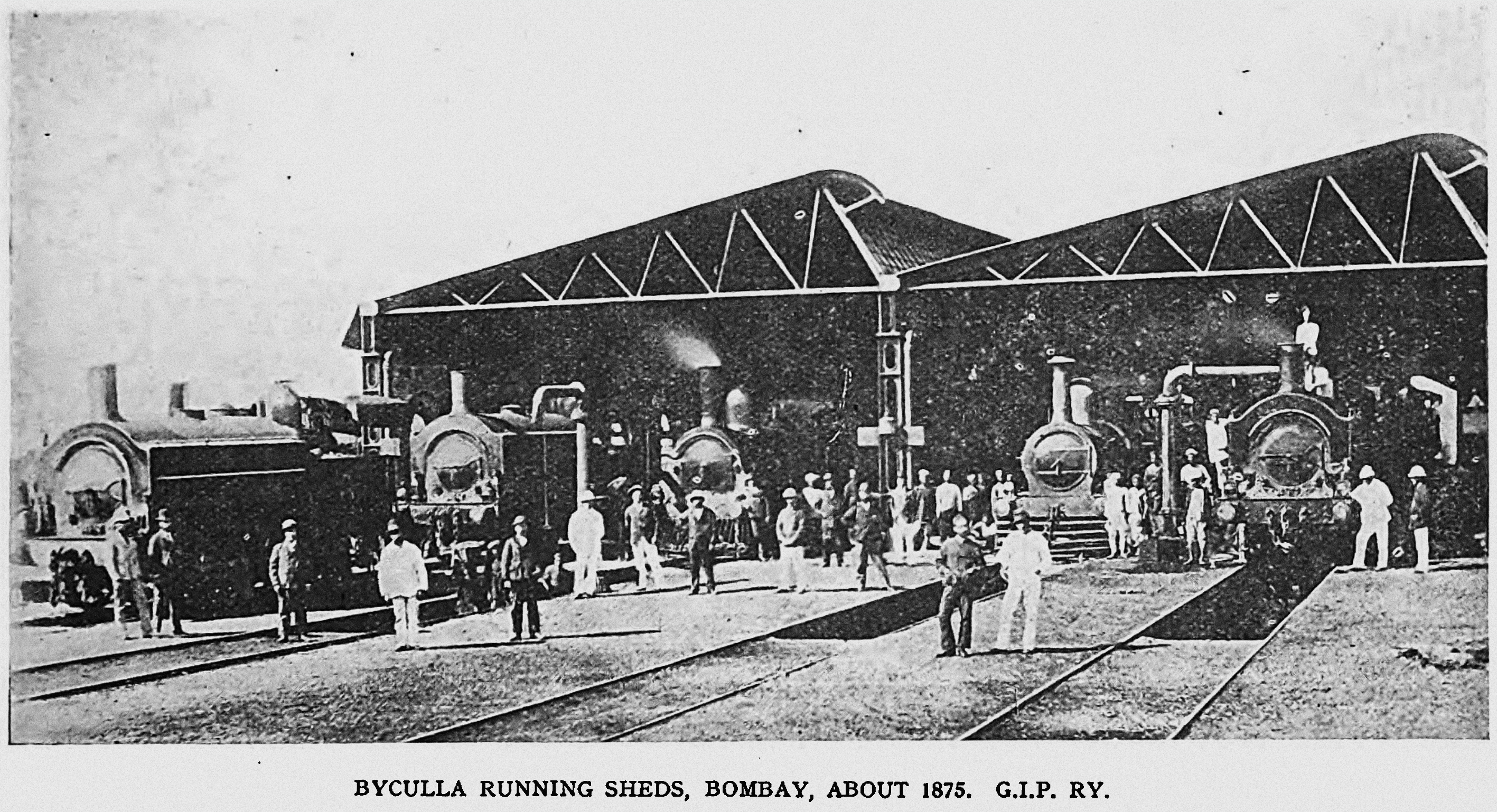
Byculla Running Sheds, around 1875

Later changes

The station was later Rebuilt in 1857, and then again in 1891. The station was shifted north of its old location, and a larger building was built on the site of the present station. The new station consisted of the station building, platforms, sheds, footbridges, horse carriage parkings, and staff quarters, all of which were complete by June 1891, and was opened on 1 July 1892. The section from Byculla to Currey Road was Quadrupled, and opened for traffic on 4th December 1905.

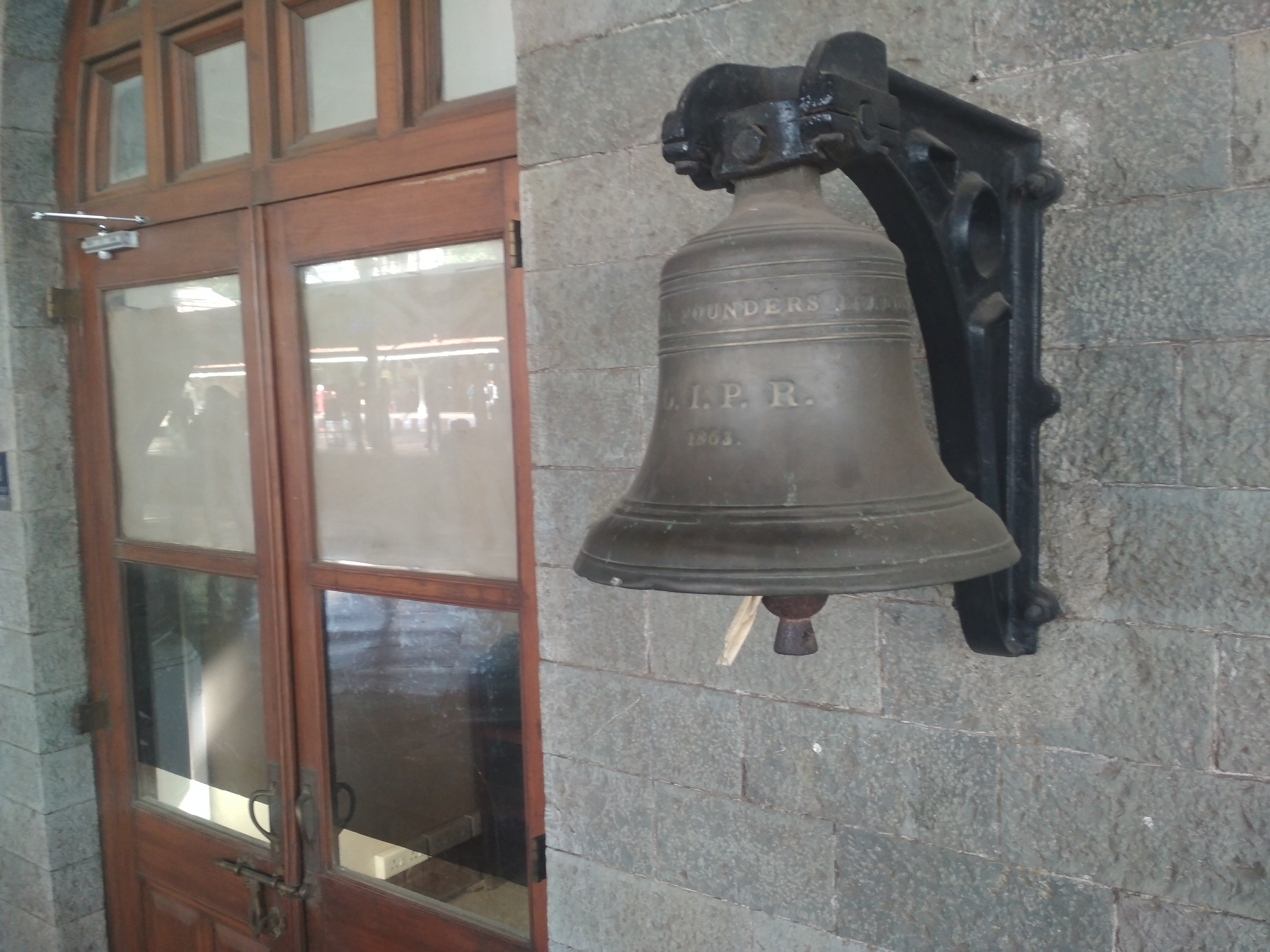
The bell outside Byculla station master's office, dated 1863

== Etymology ==
The name Byculla appears to have derived from the word sbhay (Marathi:भाय = Bawa) and khala (Marathi: खळा = area to store grains), meaning priest's grain storage.

== Gallery ==
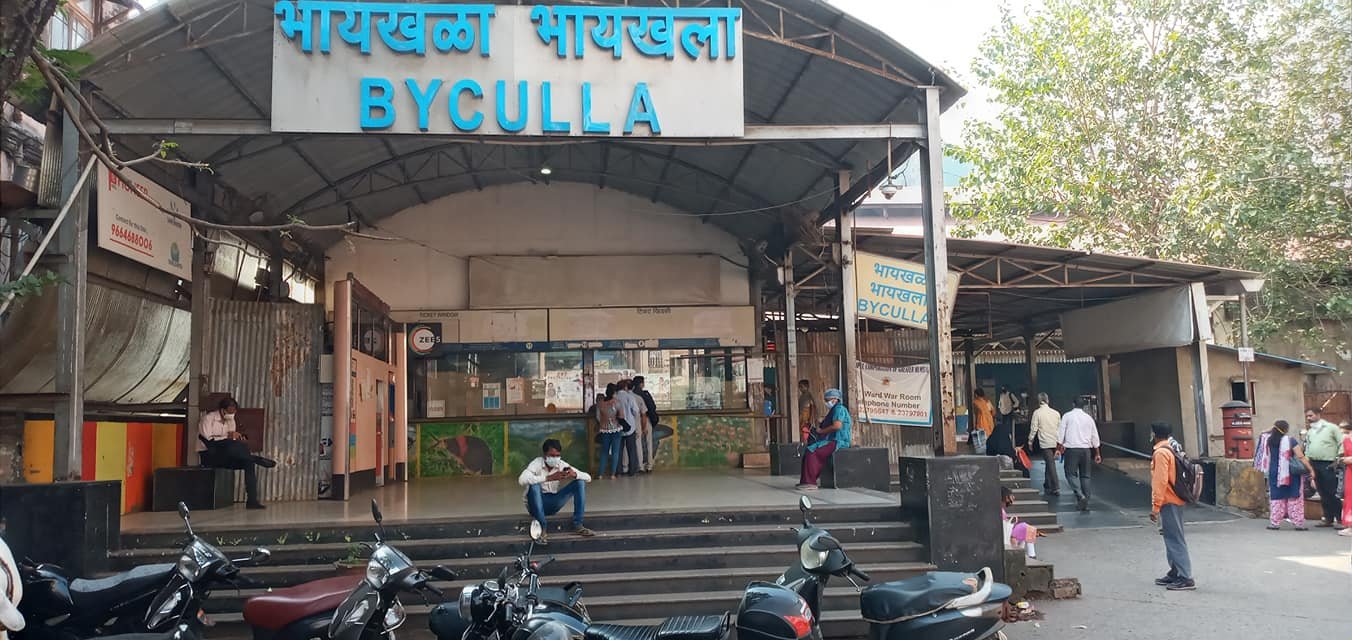
Entrance to Byculla Station (East)

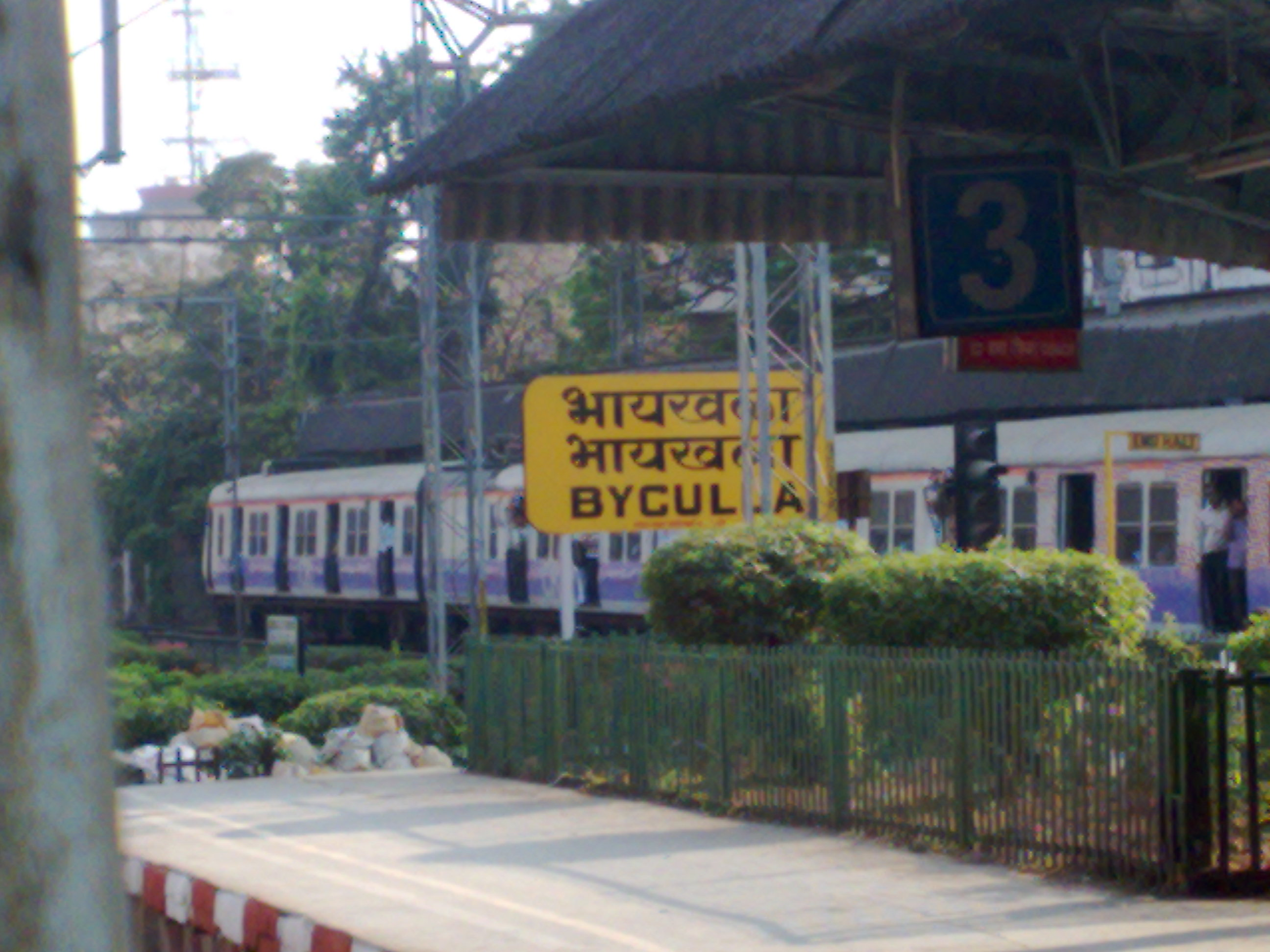
Byculla station, platform view

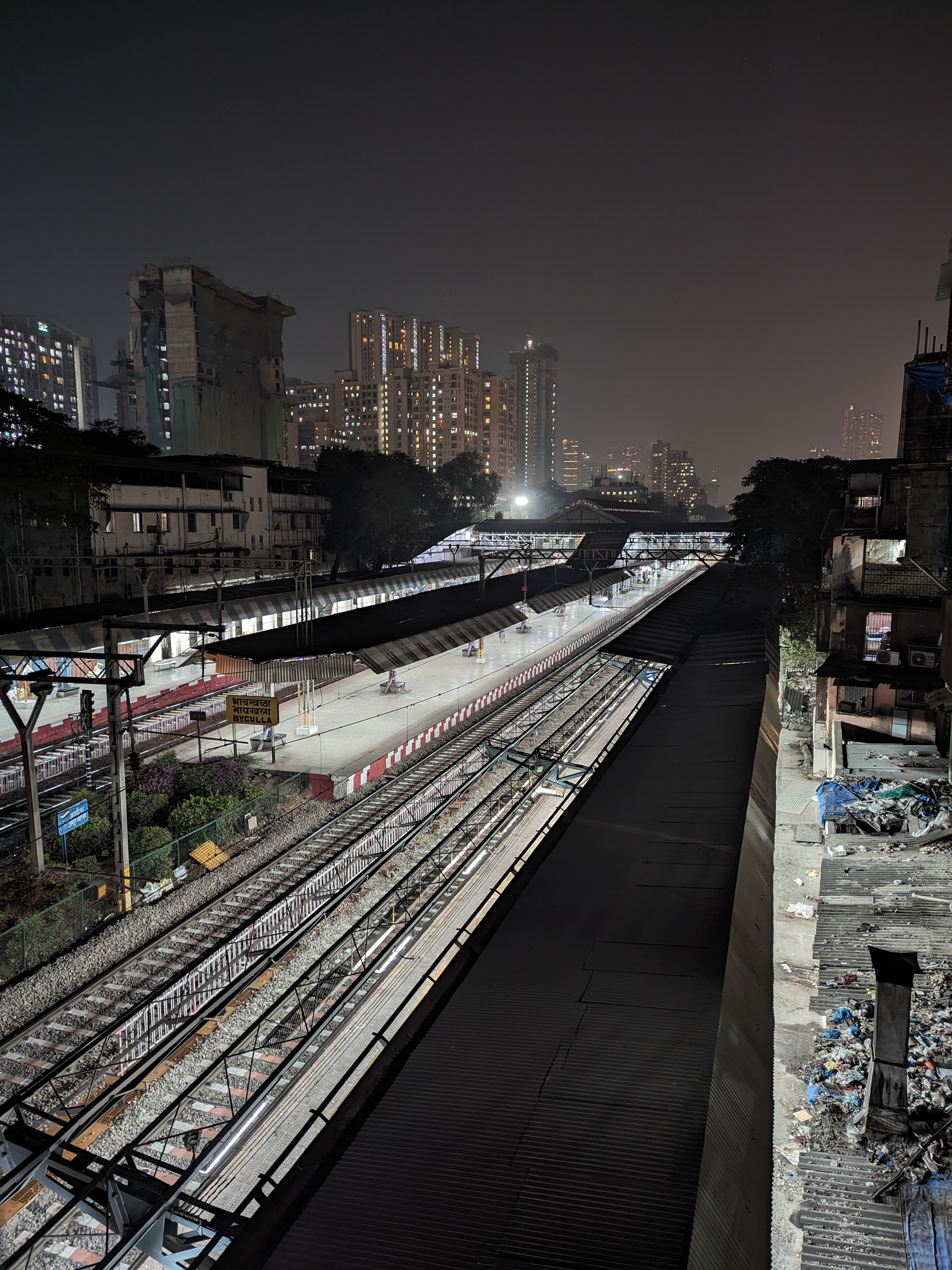
View of the Byculla railway station at night

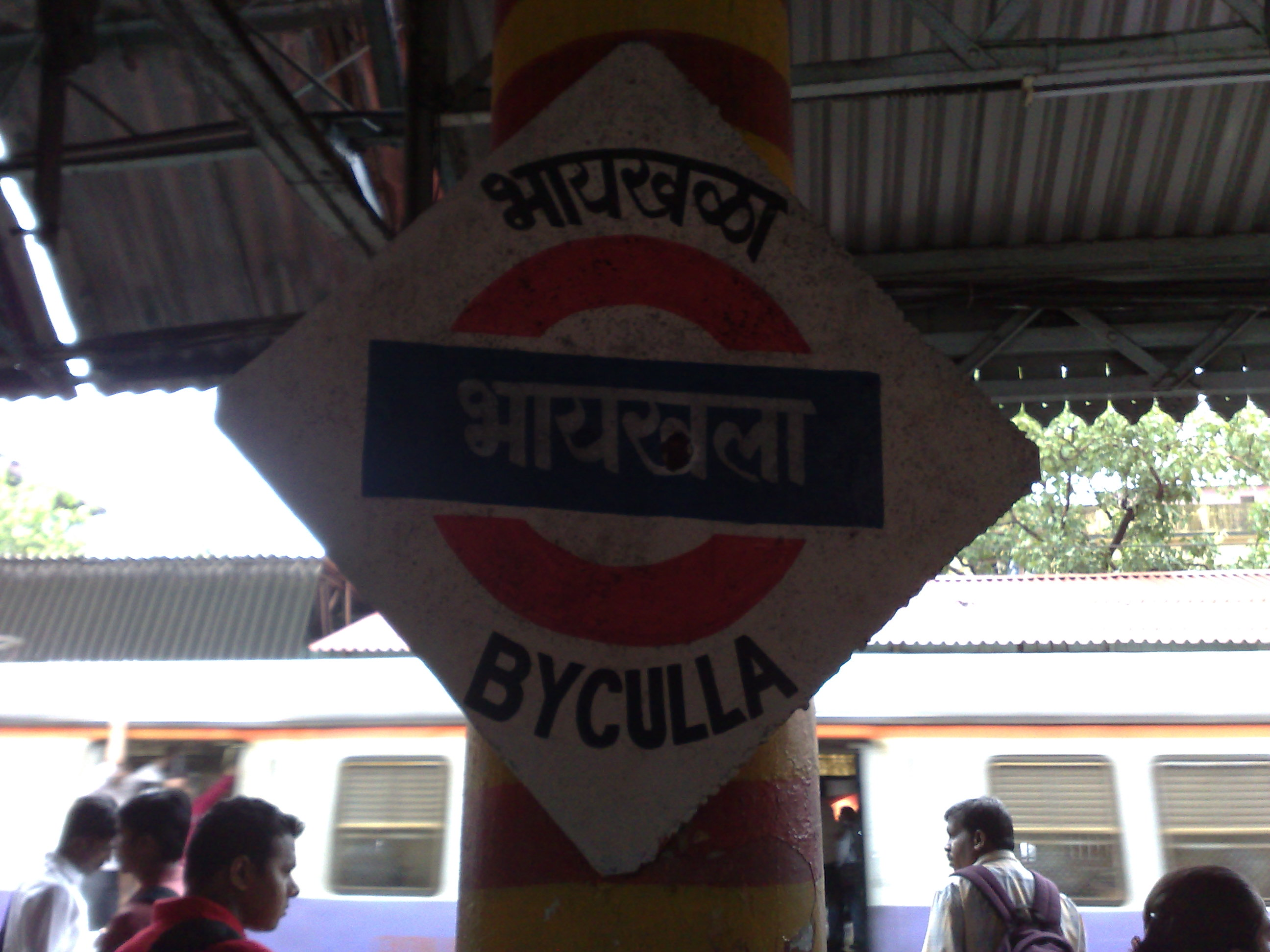
Byculla railway station board

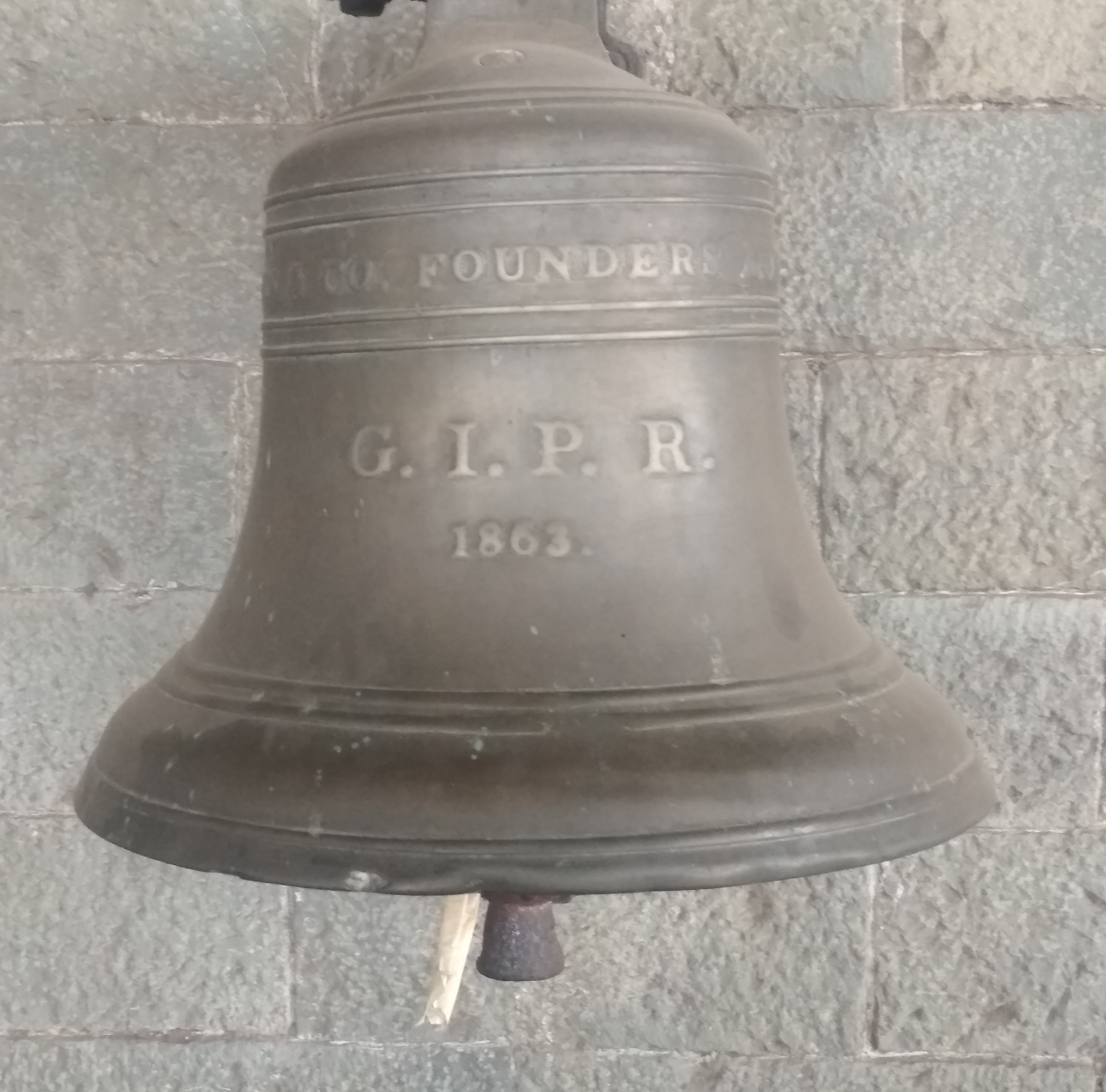
Closeup of the Bell outside Station master's office

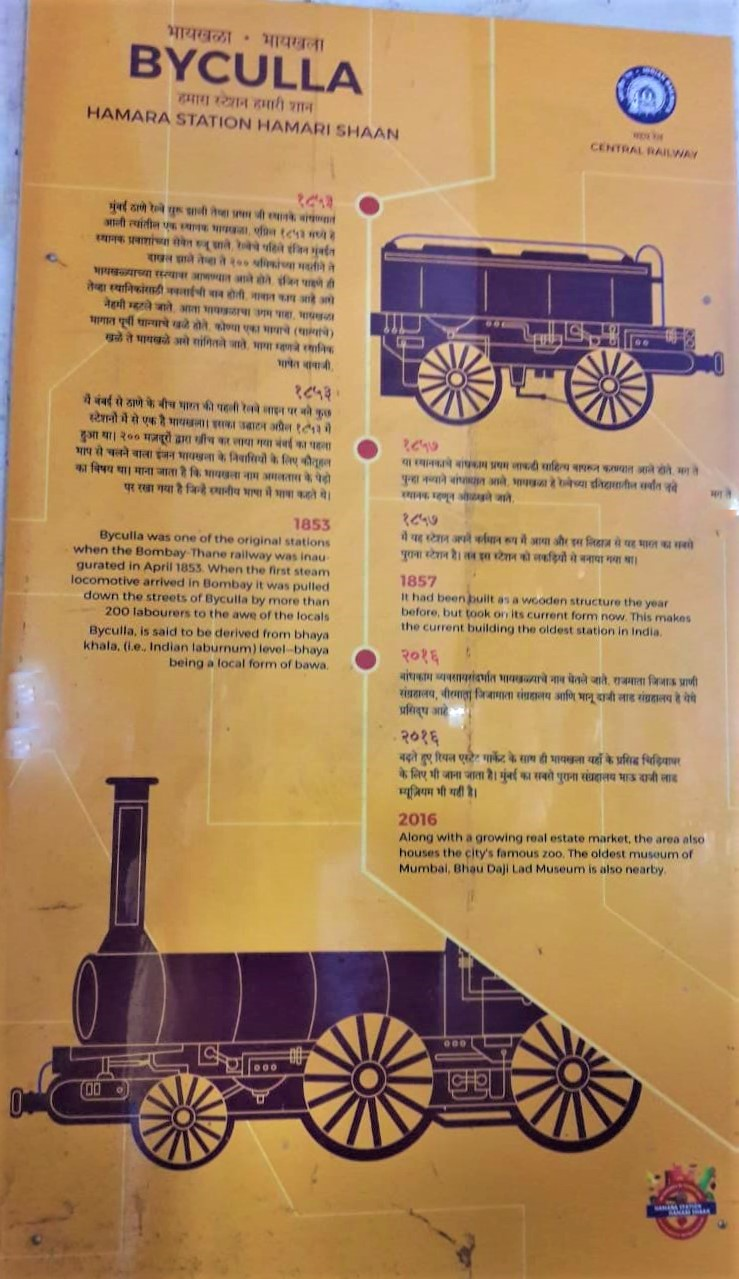
Byculla station banner

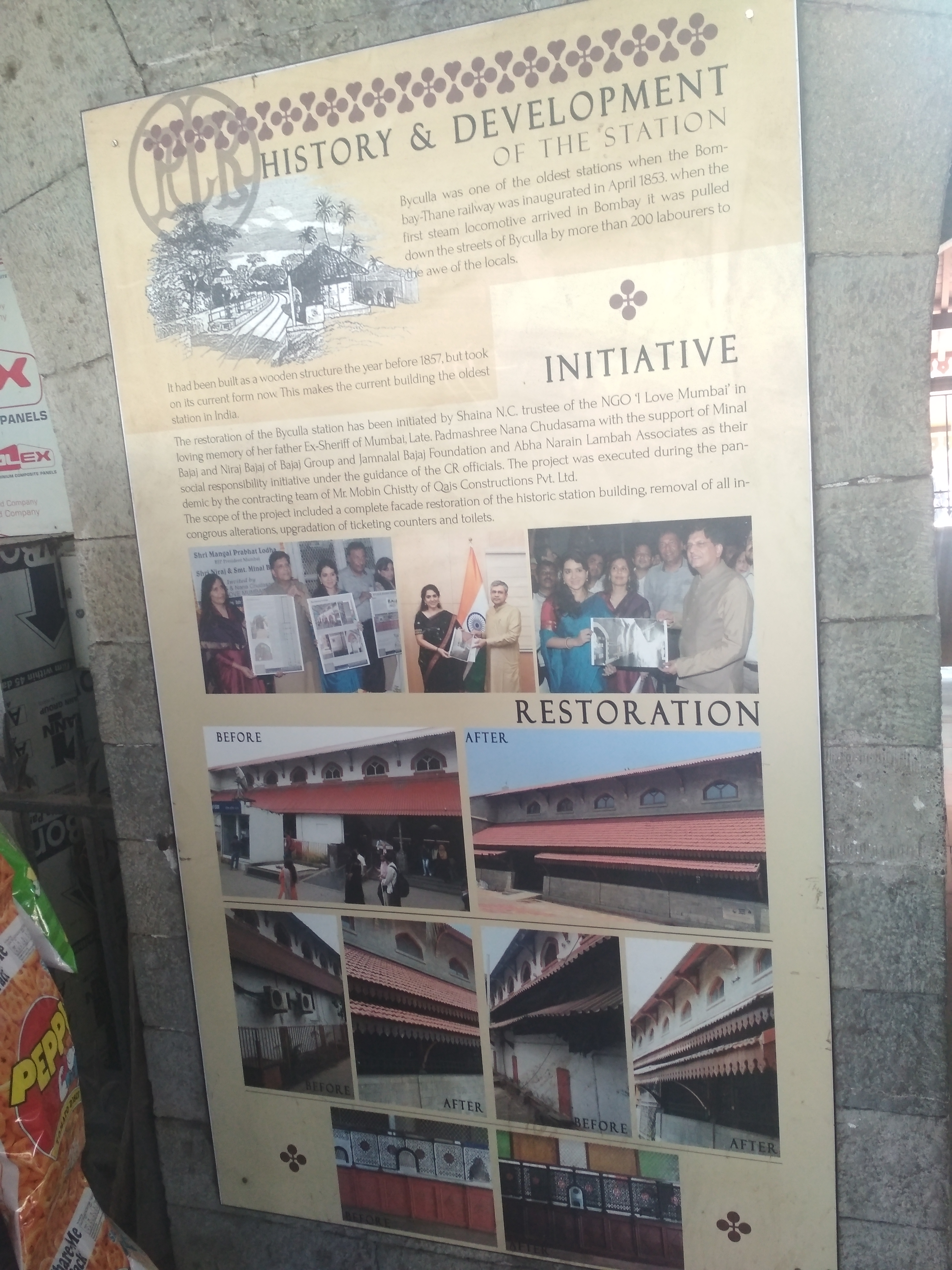
Information on restoration of Byculla station
