= Electric Loco Shed, Royapuram =

Loco shed in Tamil Nadu, India

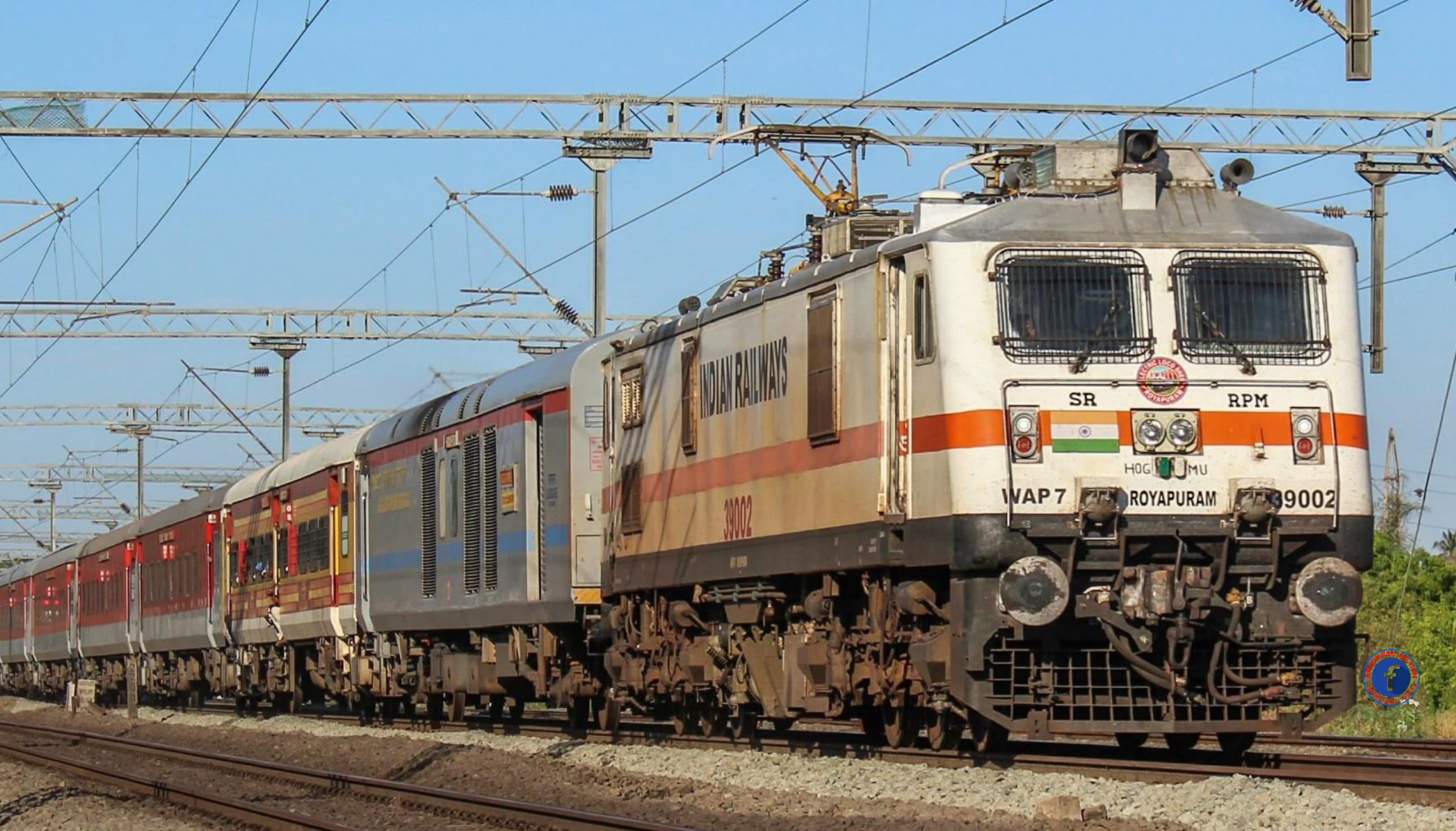
- RPM based WAP-7 hauling Netravati Express

- Location within Chennai

Location
- Location: Royapuram, Chennai, India
- Coordinates: 13.10403°N 80.29366°E

Characteristics
- Owner: Indian Railways
- Operator: Southern Railway zone
- Depot code: RPM
- Type: Engine shed
- Roads: 6
- Rolling stock: WAP-5; WAP-7

History
- Opened: 2010; 16 years ago
- Former rolling stock: WAP-1; WAP-4

Electric Loco Shed, Royapuram is a motive power depot performing locomotive maintenance and repair facility for electric locomotives of the Indian Railways, located at Royapuram on the Chennai Beach–Katpadi section of the Chennai Suburban Railway network in Chennai, India. It is located in the Southern Railway zone and it is one of the three electric locomotive sheds of the Southern Railway, the others being at Erode (ED) and Arakkonam (AJJ) and is the newest in South India.

== History ==
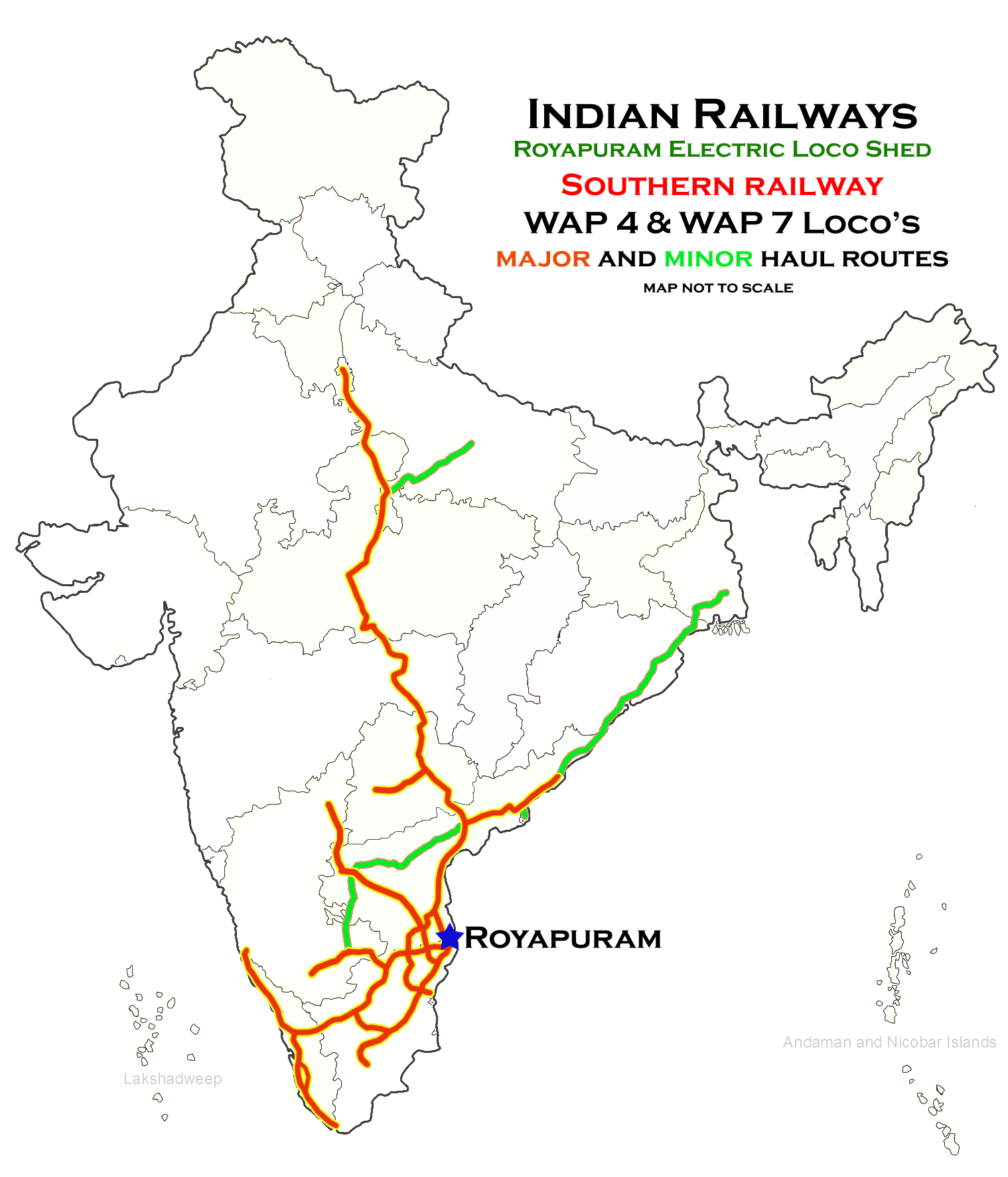
Route haul map of Royapuram Electric Loco shed

Steam locomotive sheds used to exist at Royapuram (RPM) and Basin Bridge (for Madras) until the late 1970s. After Southern Railway set a deadline to eliminate all steam locomotive operations by 1985, a push was given towards establishing electric locomotion as the primary motive power, and the Steam locomotive shed was decommissioned. To meet the needs of exponentially increasing rail traffic on the new continuous broad-gauge lines from Chennai to Kanyakumari and Palakkad with the completion of gauge conversion, the steam shed site was selected by Indian railways for a new electric locomotive shed.

But in 2006, the Southern Railway planned to lease a portion of the terminus to the corporate sector for developing cement and fertilizer depots. When this move was opposed, the railway allotted ₹ 155.5 million for locomotive maintenance shed in 2007. The foundation stone for the electric loco shed, which will be the Southern Railway's third one after Arakkonam and Erode, was laid on 25 January 2007. The loco shed was planned with an initial capacity of 50 locomotives, which would be augmented to 100 and then to 150 in phases with an investment of ₹ 450 million, and would have an inspection bay for undertaking scheduled inspections and lifting bay for undertaking both minor and major repairs. A service building for maintenance of various equipment of locomotives was planned, which will have testing and overhauling facilities.

New Electric shed was inaugurated in 2010. Initially, the shed handed only WAP-1 and WAP-4 class locomotives, but gradually were allocated WAP-7. The first loco to be homed at RPM was the WAP-1 '22000' which was also the first WAP-1 of India. Subsequently, more WAP-1s were transferred from Arakkonam and then the shed started receiving WAP-4s from Erode. The shed got its first WAP-7 numbered '30319' in September 2012. The shed also received new WAP-4 from CLW. In 2016, all WAP-1s were transferred back to Arakkonam to make way for the newly allocated WAP-7s and then in 2017 all WAP-4s were transferred back to Erode. By July 2018, Royapuram became a pure 3 Phase only Shed housing only WAP-7 locomotives.

This shed have WAP-1 and WAP-4 locomotives, but now WAP-1s are moved to Arakkonam shed and WAP-4s are moved to Erode shed.

== Operations ==
- Being one of the three electric engine sheds in Southern Railway, various major and minor maintenance schedules of electric locomotives are carried out here. It has the sanctioned capacity of 110 engine units. Beyond the operating capacity, this shed houses a total of 102 engine units, 102 WAP-7. Electric loco Shed, Royapuram housing the 3rd largest fleet of WAP-7 in Indian Railways and it caters to many long-distance electric trains.

Like all locomotive sheds, RPM does regular maintenance, overhaul and repair including painting and washing of locomotives. It not only attends to locomotives housed at RPM but to ones coming in from other sheds as well. It has four pit lines for loco repair.

Locomotives of Royapuram ELS along with Erode and Arakkonam ELS were the regular links for all trains running through Kerala and Tamil Nadu when widespread electrification of railway lines started in Southern Railways. It handled prestigious trains like the Kerala Express, and the Tamil Nadu Express. RPM locomotives used to be predominantly the regular links for trains traveling to north as well.

== Locomotive ==
Serial No.	Locomotive Class	Horsepower	Quantity
1.	WAP-5	6120	8
2.	WAP-7	6350	126
Total locomotives active as of September 2026			134

== See also ==
- Electric Loco Shed, Arakkonam
- Electric Loco Shed, Erode
- Diesel Loco Shed, Ernakulam
- Diesel Loco Shed, Erode
- Diesel Loco Shed, Golden Rock
- Diesel Loco Shed, Tondiarpet
