= Electric Loco Shed, Erode =

Loco shed in Tamilnadu, India

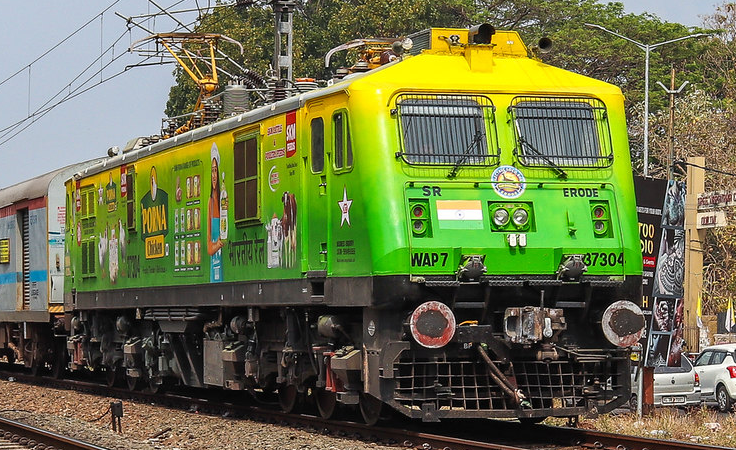
- Erode based Porna Chicken advertised WAP-7 hauling Kerala Express.

- Location within Tamil Nadu

Location
- Location: Erode, Tamil Nadu
- Coordinates: 11°21′00″N 77°44′00″E

Characteristics
- Owner: Indian Railways
- Operator: Southern Railway zone
- Depot code: ED
- Type: Engine shed
- Roads: 6
- Rolling stock: WAP-5; WAP-7; WAG-7; WAG-9

History
- Opened: 1998; 28 years ago

Electric Loco Shed, Erode is one of the premiere engine sheds located in Erode in the Indian state of Tamil Nadu. It is located along the Jolarpettai–Coimbatore line, about 1 km to the east of Erode Junction, under the administrative control of Salem railway division of Southern Railway zone.

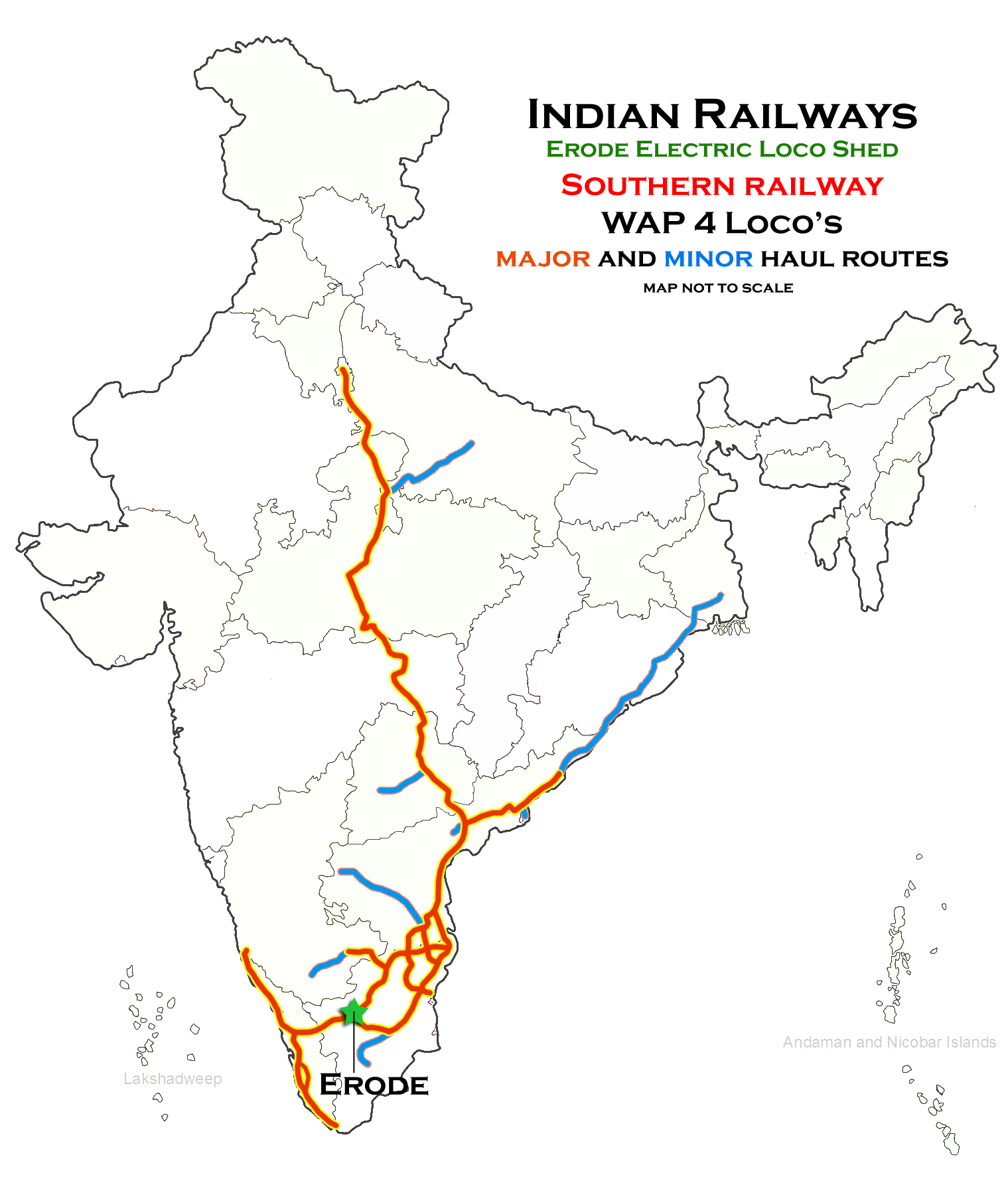
Route haul map of Erode Electric Loco shed

== Locomotives ==
Serial No.	Locomotive Class	Horsepower	Quantity
1.	WAP-5	6120	10
2.	WAP-7	6350	110
3.	WAG-7	5350	94
4.	WAG-9	6120	41
Total locomotives active as of August 2026			255

== Livery and markings ==
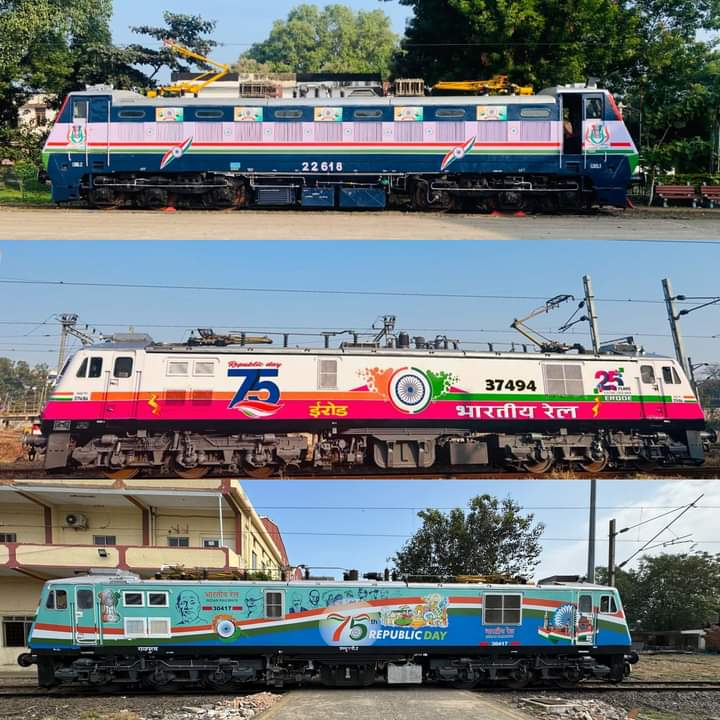
AJJ, ED, RPM shed locos with 75th Republic Day livery

Erode Loco Shed operates locomotives in various special liveries

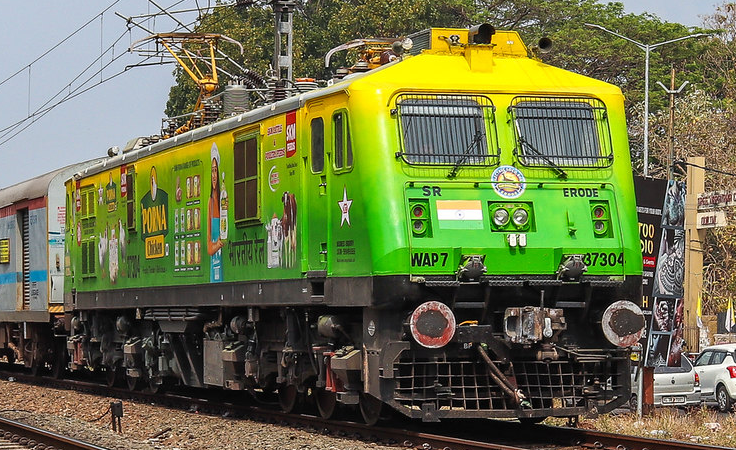
Erode based WAP-7 #37304 in Porna Chicken advertisement

Erode ELS has its own logo and stencils. It is written on loco's body side as well as front & back side.

== See also ==
- Electric Loco Shed, Arakkonam
- Electric Loco Shed, Royapuram
- Diesel Loco Shed, Ernakulam
- Diesel Loco Shed, Erode
- Diesel Loco Shed, Golden Rock
- Diesel Loco Shed, Tondiarpet
