= Electric Loco Shed, Arakkonam =

Loco shed in Tamilnadu, India

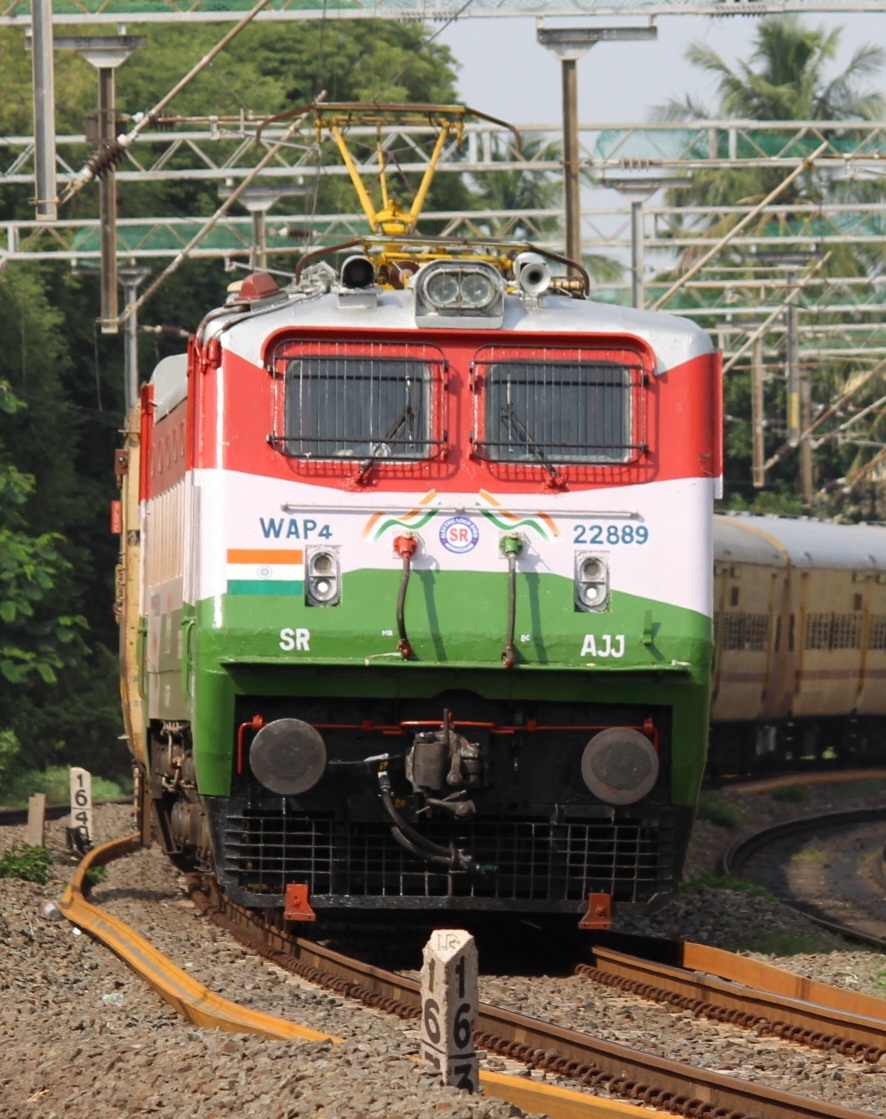
- Arakkonam based WAP-4 in Tricolour livery at Perambur.

- Location within Tamil Nadu

Location
- Location: Arakkonam, Tamil Nadu
- Coordinates: 13.08191°N 79.66845°E

Characteristics
- Owner: Indian Railways
- Operator: Southern Railway zone
- Depot code: AJJ
- Type: Engine shed
- Roads: 6
- Rolling stock: WAP-4; WAG-5; WAG-9; WAP-7

History
- Opened: 1980; 46 years ago
- Former rolling stock: WAP-1; WAG-7; WAM-4

Electric Loco Shed, Arakkonam is a motive power depot performing locomotive maintenance and repair facility for electric locomotives of the Indian Railways, located at Arrakkonam on the MGR Chennai Central – KSR Bengaluru section of the Southern Railway zone in Tamil Nadu, India. It is one of the three electric locomotive sheds of the Southern Railway, the others being at Erode (ED) and Royapuram (RPM) and is the oldest in south India.

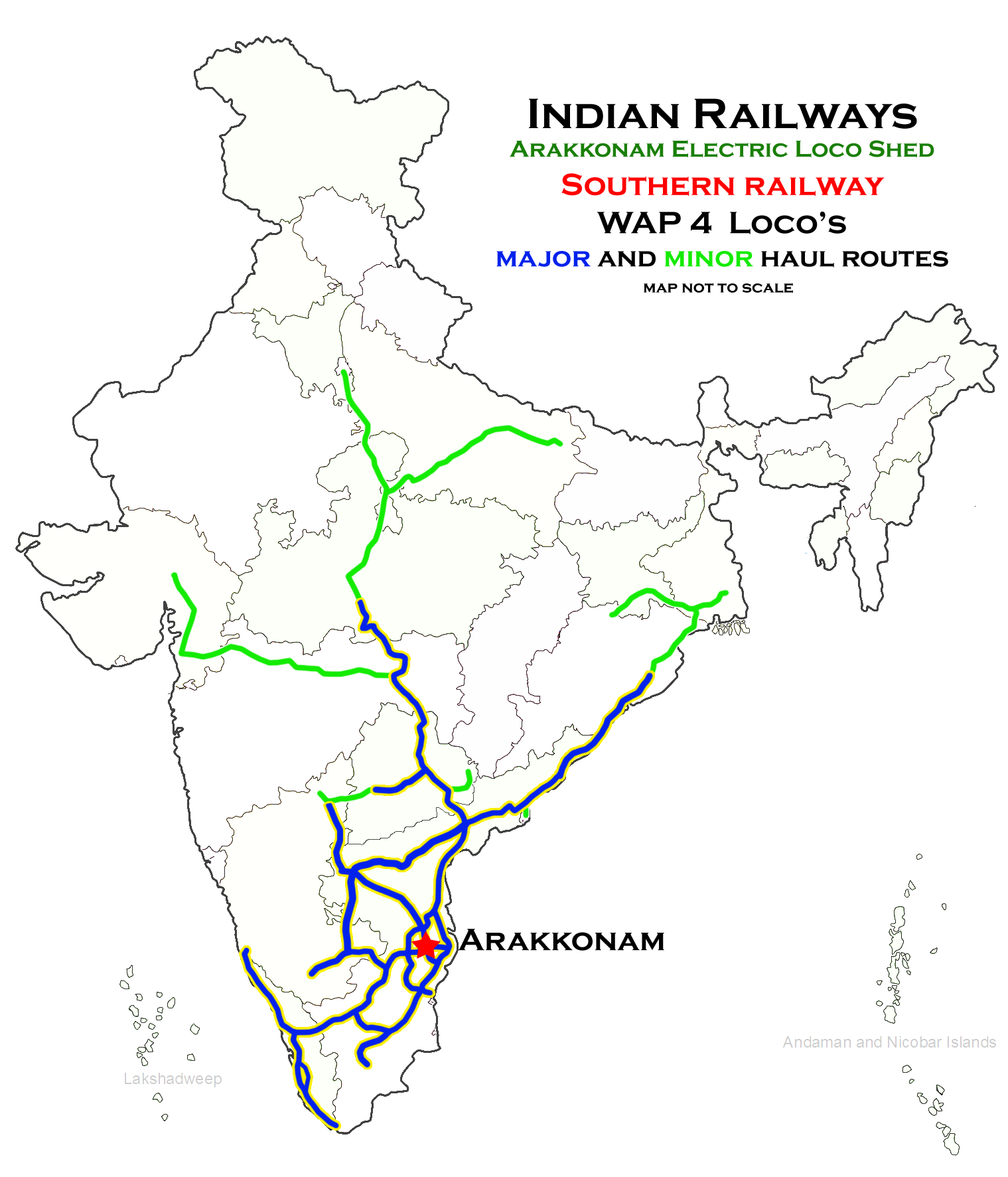
Route haul map of Arakkonam Electric Loco shed

== History ==
Steam locomotive sheds used to exist at Arrokonam (AJJ) until the late 1970s. After Southern Railway set a deadline to eliminate all steam locomotive operations by 1990, a push was given towards establishing electric locomotion as the primary motive power, and the Steam locomotive shed was decommissioned. To meet the needs of exponentially increasing rail traffic on the new continuous broad-gauge lines from Chennai to Kanyakumari and Palakkad with the completion of gauge conversion, the steam shed site was selected by Indian railways for a new electric locomotive shed. New Electric locomotive shed was inaugurated in the 1980s with WAM-4 class. This shed then got 5 WAP-1 from Ghaziabad which stayed until 2002, then they were transferred back to Ghaziabad again. It later got the entire Southern Railway (SR) fleet of WAP-4 locos. Later these were then moved to Erode and Lallaguda. New WAG-7 locos were acquired but later transferred to Erode. In 2009, 30 WAP-1 locos transferred back from Ghaziabad out of which all but 5 were sent to Royapuram in 2011.

All the WAM-4s of this shed have been retired/withdrawn from service. All WAP-1 units has been moved to Erode(EDDS)

== Operations ==
Being one of the three electric engine sheds in Southern Railway, various major and minor maintenance schedules of electric locomotives are carried out here. It has a sanctioned capacity of 150 engine units. This shed houses a total of 184 engine units, including 90 WAP-4, 91 WAG-5. and 3 WAG-9 Electric loco Shed, Erode is now housing the 2nd largest fleet of WAP-4 in Indian Railways and it caters to many long-distance electric trains.

Like all locomotive sheds, AJJ does regular maintenance, overhaul and repair including painting and washing of locomotives. It not only attends to locomotives housed at AJJ but to those coming in from other sheds as well. It has four pit lines for loco repair. Locomotives of Arakkonam ELS along with Erode and Royapuram ELS were the regular links for all trains running through Kerala and Tamil Nadu when widespread electrification of railway lines started in Southern Railways. It handled prestigious trains like the Kerala Express, and the Tamil Nadu Express. AJJ locomotives used to be predominantly the regular links for trains traveling to north as well.

The shed received its first WAP 7s (#39675, #39680, #39684, #39688), from PLW in September 2026.

== Livery and markings ==
AJJ-based locos can be identified by sticker marks of AJJ ELS. AJJ WAP-4 can also be identified by thunderbolts sign in front and back of the loco. The AJJ-based WAP-4 has many different types of liveries. Some liveries are given below.

SN	Locomotive Livery	Pic
1.	AJJ WAP-4 in standard red livery	
2.	AJJ based WAP-4 in ICF shatabdi livery	
3.	AJJ based WAP-4 in ICF rajdhani livery	
4.	AJJ based WAP-4 in the old sapthagiri livery	
5.	AJJ Based WAP-4 in Tricolour band Stickers	

AJJ based WAG-9 and WAG-5 have a standard livery all over India

== Locomotives ==
Serial No.	Locomotive Class	Horsepower	Quantity
1.	WAP-4	5350	83
2.	WAP-7	6350	5
3.	WAG-5	3800	6
4.	WAG-9	6122	130
Total Locomotives active as of October 2026			224

== See also ==
- Electric Loco Shed, Erode
- Electric Loco Shed, Royapuram
- Diesel Loco Shed, Ernakulam
- Diesel Loco Shed, Erode
- Diesel Loco Shed, Golden Rock
- Diesel Loco Shed, Tondiarpet
