= ALCO DL560C =

Series of diesel–electric locomotives

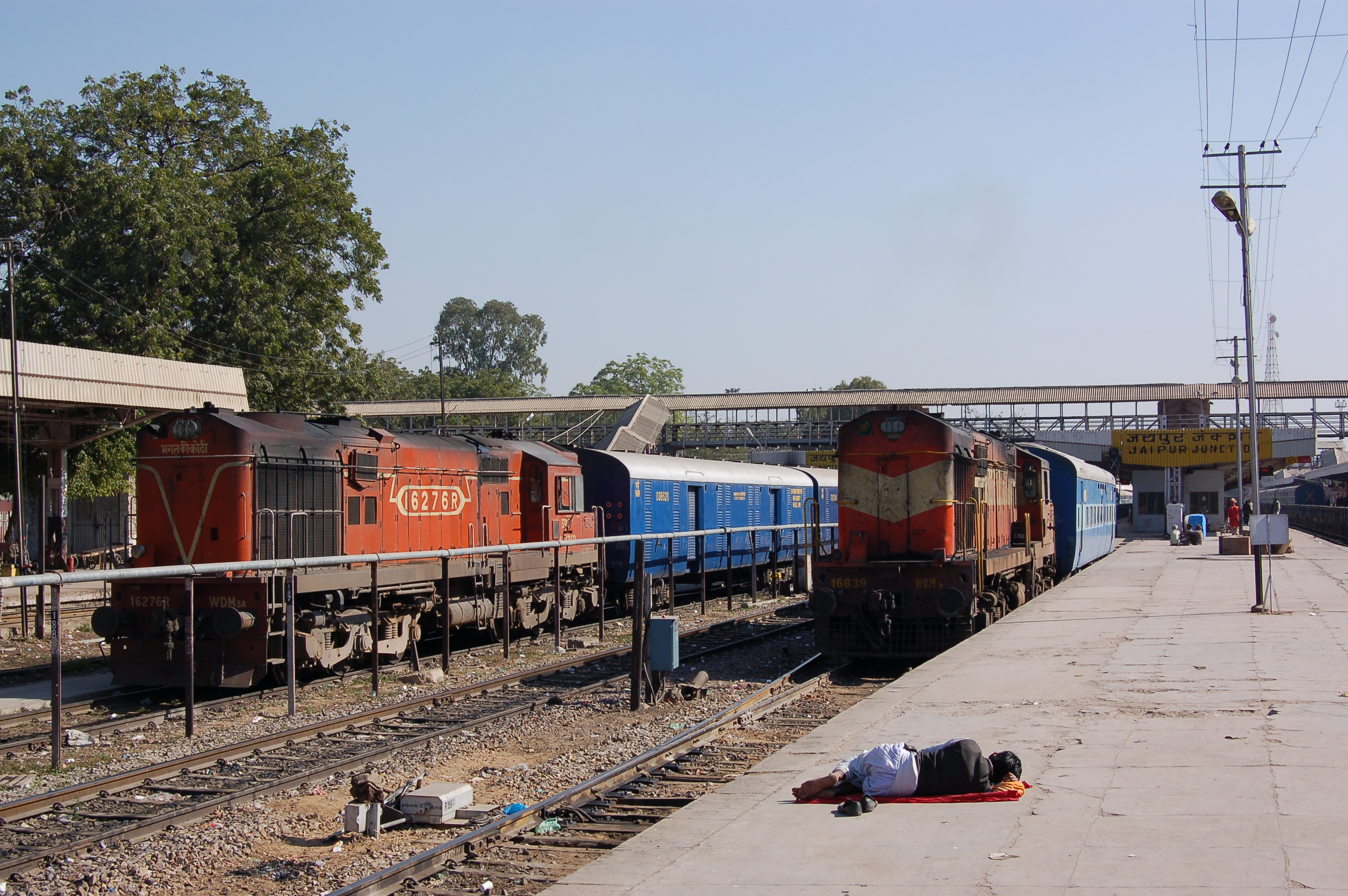
- A WDM-2 (right) and a WDM-3A (left), both long-hood forward at Jaipur Junction, 2008
Type and origin
- Power type: Diesel
- Builder: ALCO, BLW (Manufacturing) & DLMW, Parel workshop (overhauling and rebuilding)
- Model: ALCO DL560C
- Build date: 1962–2016
Specifications
- Configuration
  - AAR: C-C
- Gauge: 5 ft 6 in (1,676 mm)
- Bogies: Co-Co
- Fuel type: Diesel fuel
- Fuel capacity: 1,320.86 US gal (1,099.85 imp gal; 5,000.0 L) (WDM-2)(WDM-3D); 1,585.032 US gal (1,319.815 imp gal; 6,000.00 L) (WDM-3A/2C)(WDG-3A)
- Prime mover: ALCO 16-251-B, C
- Engine type: 4-stroke V16 diesel
- Aspiration: Turbo-Supercharged
- Cylinders: 16,6
- Transmission: Diesel electric
- Loco brake: Air
- Train brakes: Air
Performance figures
- Power output: 2,600 hp (1,940 kW) (WDM-2); 3,100 hp (2,310 kW) (WDM-3A/2C); 3,100 hp (2,310 kW) (WDG-3A); 3,300 hp (2,460 kW) (WDM-3D)
Career
- Operators: Indian Railways
- Locale: India

The ALCO DL560C is a series of diesel–electric locomotive with AC electric transmission designed by the American Locomotive Company and produced under license by Banaras Locomotive Works (BLW) Varanasi, India for Indian Railways as their classes WDM-2, WDM-3A/2C, WDM-3D and WDG-3A for operation in India. The locomotive is fitted with a 16-cylinder ALCO 251 B, C diesel engine. In the early 1960s Indian Railways needed a reliable diesel workhorse to gradually replace its steam locomotive fleet. Equal numbers (40 each) of ALCO's DL560C and EMD's G16 were chosen for trials. More locomotives of each of these were purchased for more trials. Indian Railways was keen on producing these locomotives in the country rather than depending on imports. EMD did not agree for a Transfer-of-Technology, while ALCO did. Thus ALCO DL560C was chosen for the job due to its easy maintenance, reliability and simple operation. And from then on vast numbers of this loco in different configurations have been produced and remain the main diesel traction power of Indian Railways.

== Indian Versions ==
There are four main variants of this loco, which are extensively modified for particular needs. They are, as follows:

=== WDM-2 ===
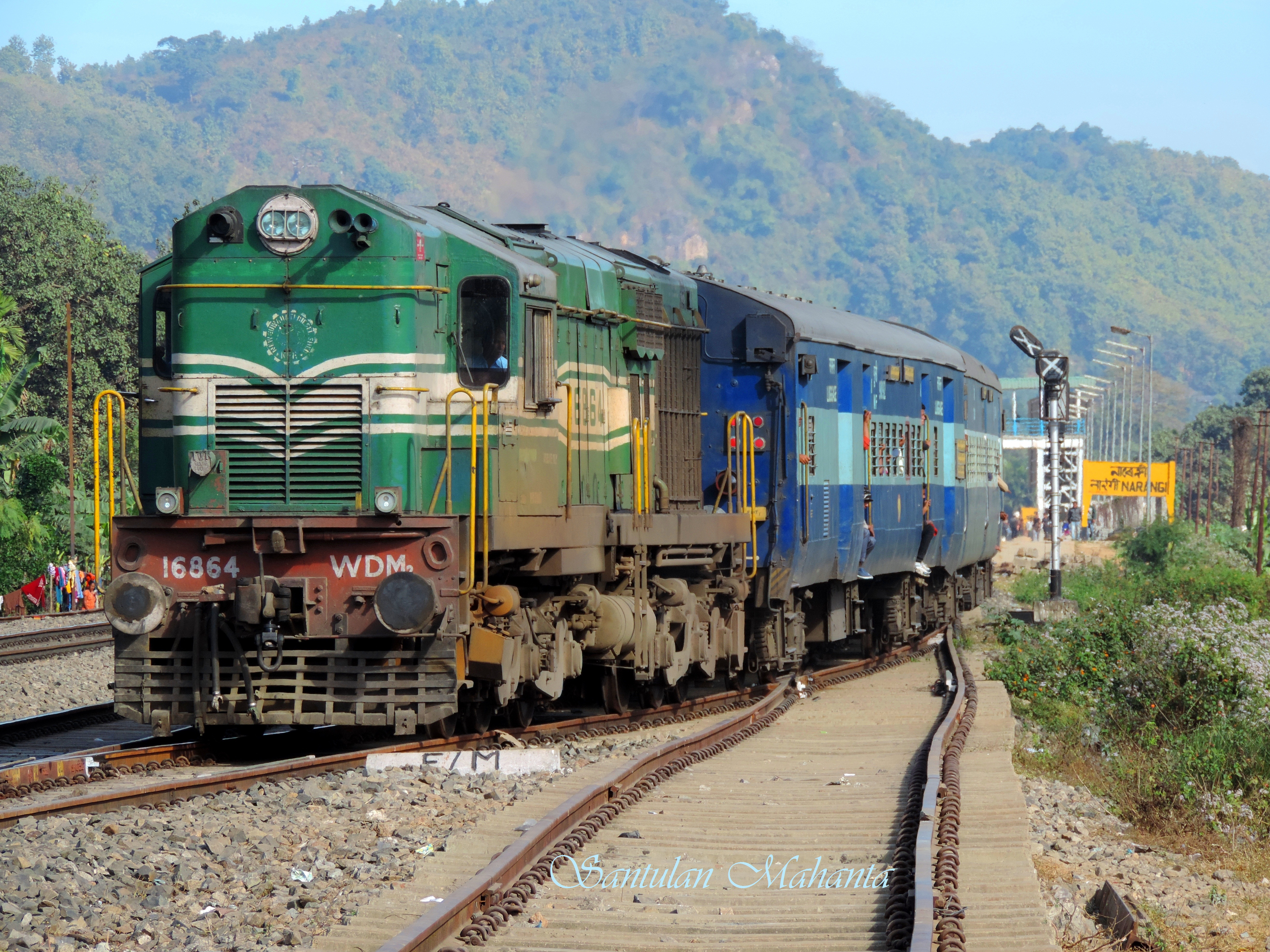
Golden Rock Diesel Loco Shed based WDM-2 leading Mariani–Guwahati Intercity Express exits Narangi railway station

The first loco of the type DL560C to arrive in India is WDM-2. Initial batches arrived from the ALCO manufacturing facility in ready-to-ride condition. And 12 more arrived from ALCO in,to be assembled kits. This loco remained as the workhorse of Indian Railways in the 20th century. This loco solely can haul 9 passenger compartments and can haul 18 with the help of another WDM-2. This model had a maintenance schedule of 3,000 km (1,900 mi) every 10 days. After later improving the fluid level and bearings, the schedule was increased to 30 days. The gear ratio being 65:18 and having a max speed of 120 km/h (75 mph). JUMBOS (full-width short hood) and WDM-2A/2B are some of WDM-2s variants with minor modifications. The production began in the late 1960s, and went on till the late 1990s. They are being eventually retired. They belong to series 18xxx, 17xxx and 16xxx.

=== WDM-3A/2C ===
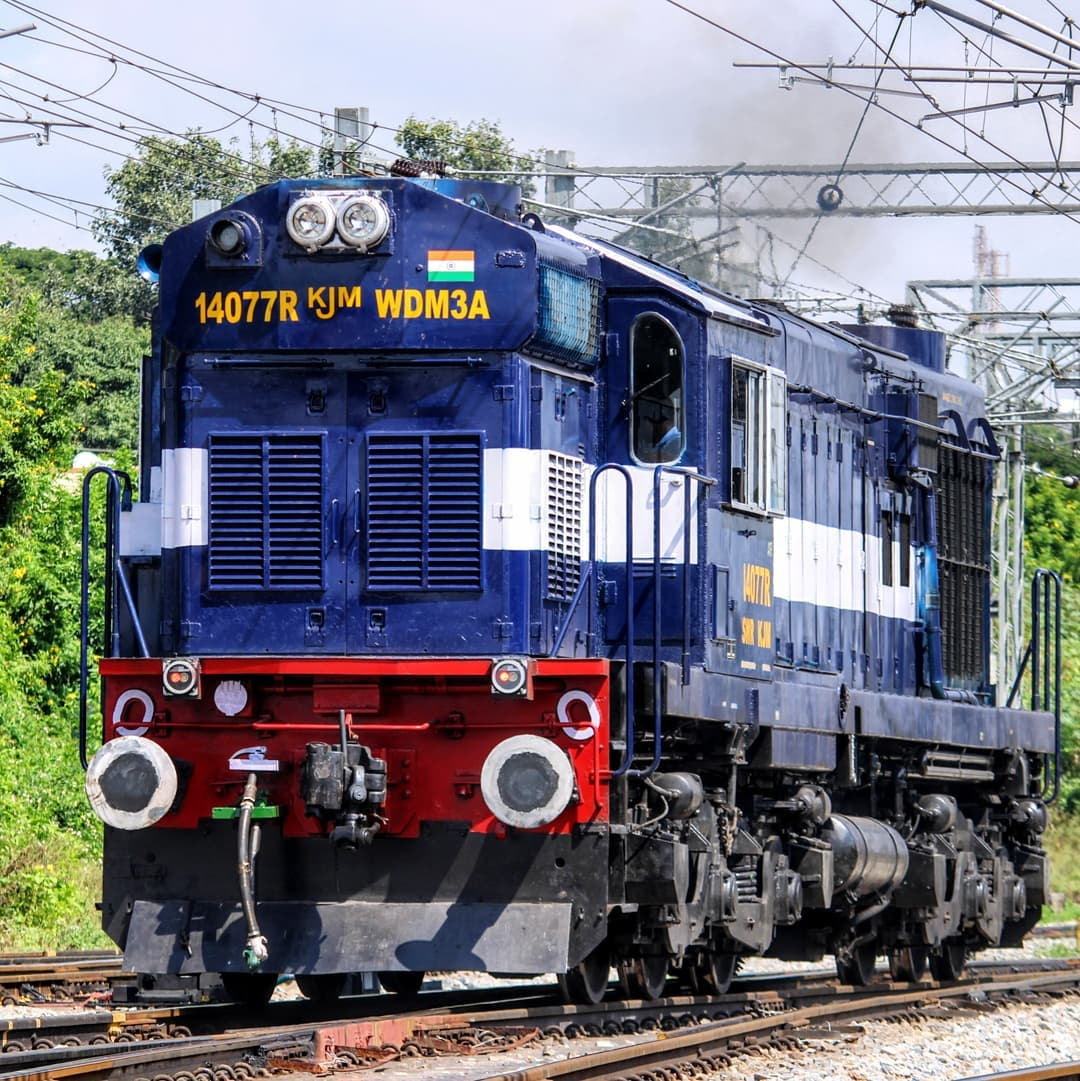
Krishnarajapuram Diesel Loco Shed based WDM-3A at Yeshwantpur

WDM-3A, previously known as WDM-2C, are more powerful than the previous WDM-2 version by 500 hp (370 kW). The first loco was delivered in 1994. This loco was shown to do the work of two WDM-2S. They too had a top speed of 120 km/h (75 mph). The gear ratio is same as the WDM-2. Some locomotives had their maximum power output increased to 3,900 hp (2,900 kW) and classed as WDM-3A. They are still under production. WDM-3C is an upgraded loco from its previous WDM-3A. Their series is 14xxx.

=== WDM-3D ===
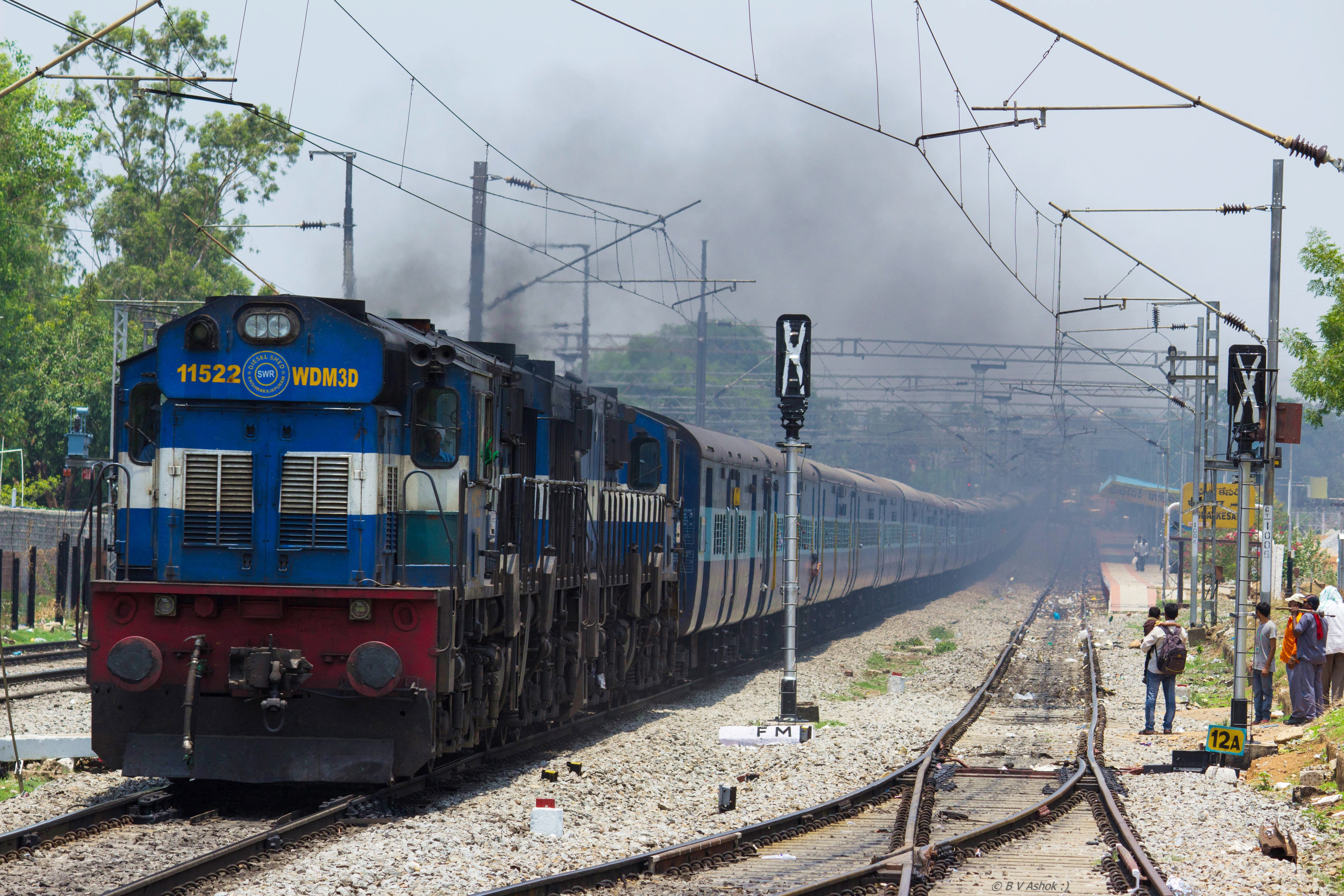
Krishnarajapuram Diesel Loco Shed based WDM-3D twins with Wainganga Superfast Express

This is the latest and the most advanced variant of all the available ALCOs. The WDM-3D are fitted with micro-processors. This variant has enhanced cabin facilities including left hand driving. This loco also has some features borrowed from its mate EMD GT46PAC. Features such as microprocessors to detect wheel slipping and phased manner power supply, monitoring engine parameters are incorporated from the latest EMD GT46PAC. This variant proved highly successful, as after serial production began in 2005 almost all broad gauge diesel sheds were allotted with this loco. The minor variants of this loco include WDM–3E and WDM–3F. They belong to series 11xxx.

=== WDG-3A ===
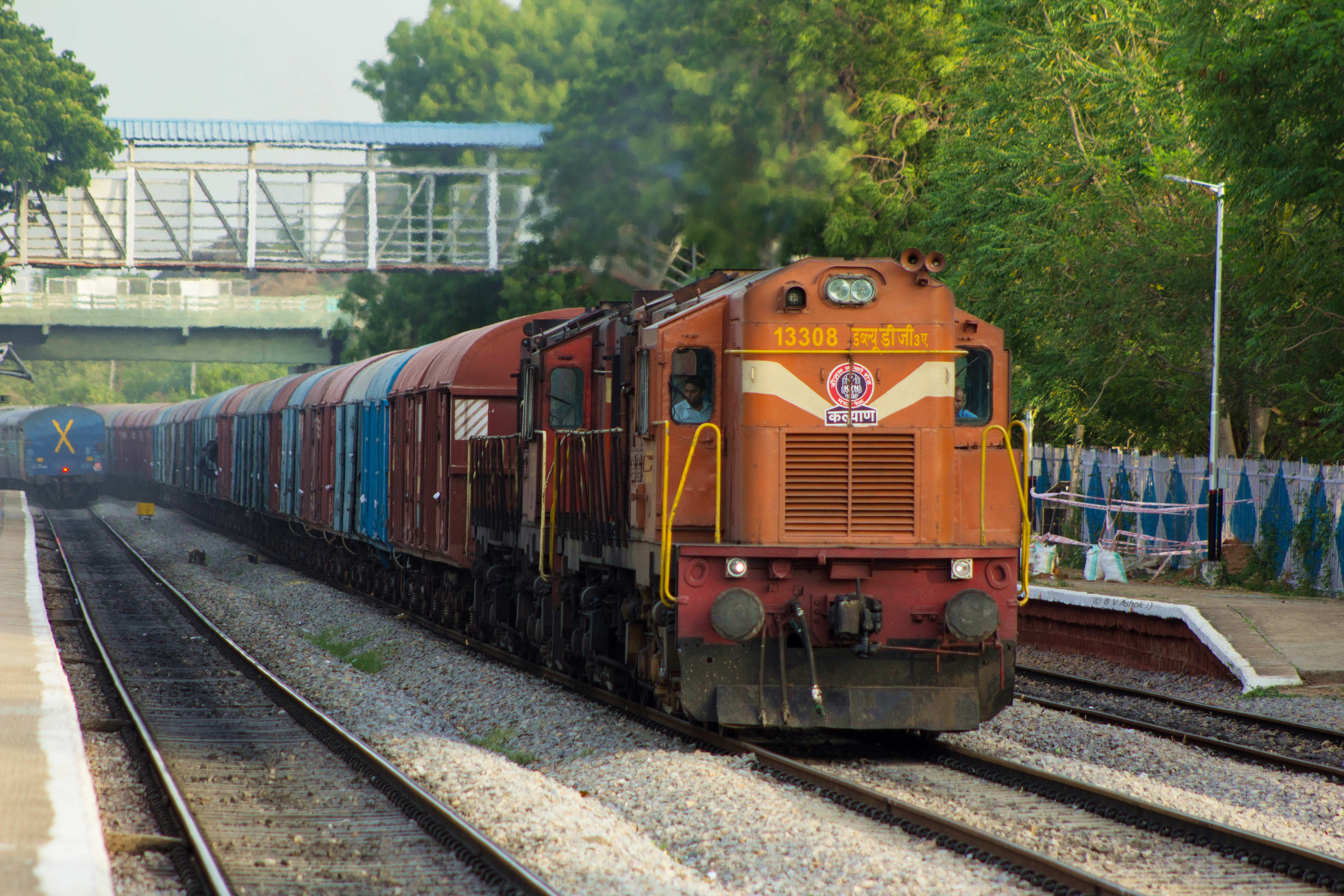
Kalyan Diesel Loco Shed based WDG-3A twin with freight train

WDG-3A, previously known as WDG-2 were designed owing to the problems which arose with WDM-2 on hauling freight. This loco normally hauls freight. The common problems were poor ride quality, lateral oscillations, and poor traction with heavy loads. First loco was manufactured in 1995. The gear ratio is 74:18. This loco has a balancing speed of 69 km/h with a load of 58 BOXN wagons (Max. speed 100 km/h). This variant is being gradually modernized to the level of WDM-3Ds. Some of its minor improvements include WDG-3B, WDG-3C and WDG-3D. Their series are in 14501-14999 and 13000–13665. Last one built for Indian Railway was 13665 rolled out in 2012. Total 1171 were built for Indian Railways and a considerable number were supplied to non Railway customers like thermal power plants, port trusts and steel plants.

=== WDM-7 ===
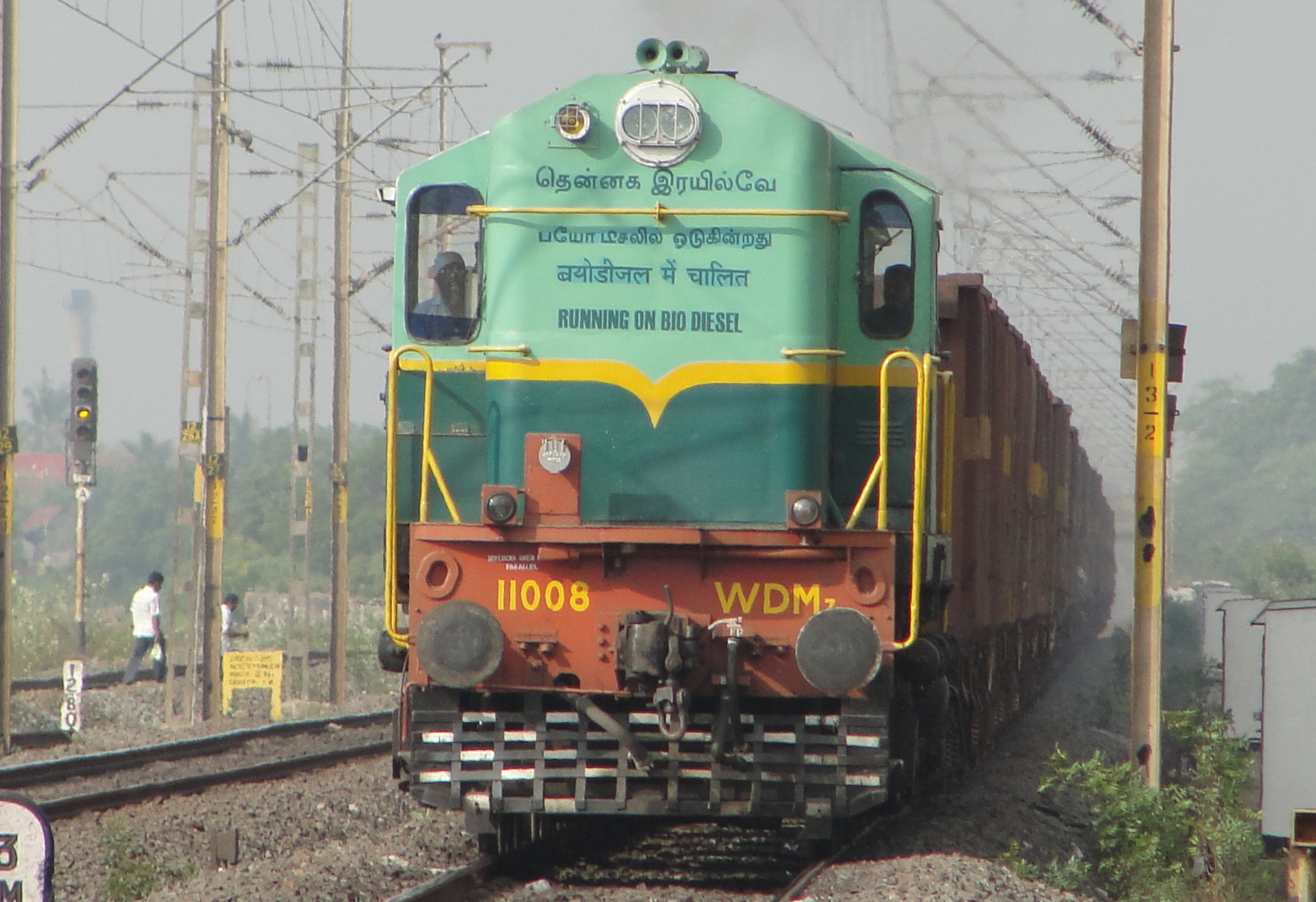
Tondiarpet Diesel Loco Shed based WDM-7 11008 hauling a freight train, fuelled by bio-diesel

They are lower powered (2000 HP instead of 2600 HP) version of the WDM-2. These locomotives were built from 1987 to 1989. A few were at Ernakulam earlier, but later all were transferred to Tondiarpet seen shunting at Chennai Central or for light passenger haulage. Some are at the thermal power station, Chennai.

They were formerly housed at Erode and Golden Rock also. They are reliable and rugged locomotives even though low powered. They can be easily recognized by the lack of grilles on the short hood. Two locomotives are running on a mixture of bio-diesel and diesel. All 15 are still in service.

=== Export versions ===
==== Sri Lanka ====
WDM-2 - Class M8 In Sri Lanka

Eight WDM-2 locomotives were purchased by the Sri Lanka Railways, the state run railroad operator in Sri Lanka in 1996. They were the longest and most powerful locomotives at that time. They were allocated the M8 class. However, some modifications to the appearance were done by SLR. These locomotives belong to road number 841 to 848 and all are still operational.

==== Bangladesh ====
Ten WDM-2 locomotives were purchased by Bangladesh Railway in 2001. They were the most powerful locomotives at that time. They were allocated Class 6400 or BED-26 numbered from 6401 to 6410. All are fitted with air brake and AAR coupling. Unlike their Indian counterparts, these locomotives do not have the dynamic braking system. All locomotives are still in service.

On 27 July 2020 Indian Railways (IR) handed over 10 WDM-3D diesel locomotives to Bangladesh Railways under its “grant assistance” plan. The vehicles cost an estimated ₹600m ($US 8m) to manufacture.

== Manufacturers ==
They were manufactured and designed by ALCO. Now they are licensed produced by BLW and are overhauled and rebuilt by DLMW. The rebuilt locos carry an 'R' behind their serial number.

== Users ==
The locomotive is used by the following zones of Indian Railways:

- South Western Railway
- Southern Railway
- Central Railway
- South Central Railway
- South Coast Railway
- Northern Railway
- North Western Railway
- Northeast Frontier Railway
- West Central Railway
- East Central Railway
- Western Railway
- South East Central Railway
- East Coast Railway
- North Central Railway
- North Eastern Railway
- Eastern Railway
- South Eastern Railway

In addition, DL560Cs were exported to

- PeruRail
- Bangladesh Railway
- Sri Lanka Railways

== See also ==
- Indian Railways
- Locomotives of India
- Rail transport in India
