= Indian locomotive class WDM-7 =

Diesel-electric locomotive of Indian Railways

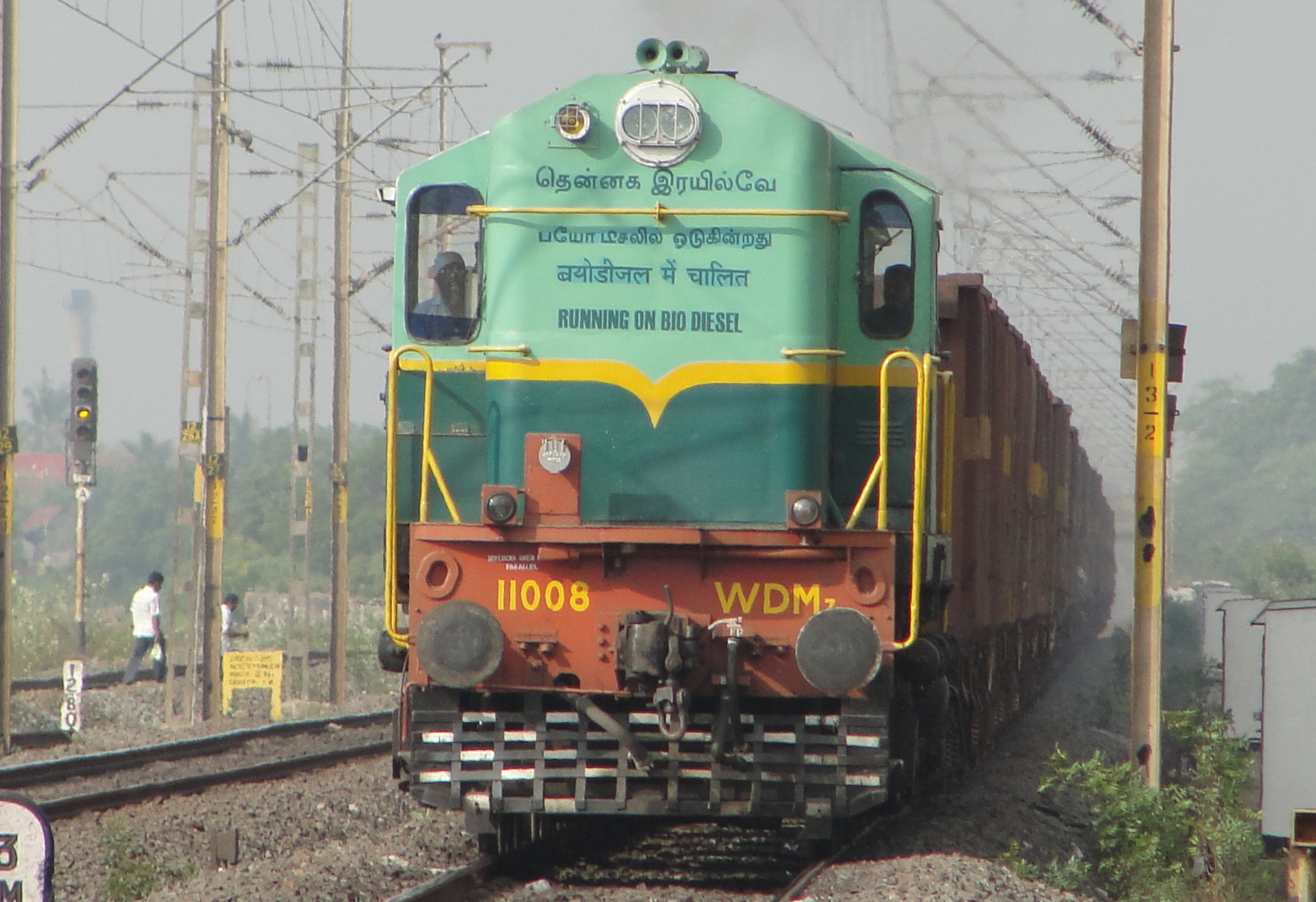
- WDM-7 #11008 hauling a freight train; this loco is fuelled by bio-diesel
Type and origin
- Power type: Diesel
- Builder: Banaras Locomotive Works
- Order number: 11709-11290
- Serial number: 21790
- Model: DL560C
- Build date: 1987–1989
- Total produced: 15
Specifications
- Configuration
  - UIC: Co′Co′
  - Commonwealth: Co-Co
- Gauge: 1,676 mm (5 ft 6 in)
- Bogies: ALCO Asymmetric cast frame trimount
- Wheel diameter: 1,092 mm (3 ft 7 in)
- Wheelbase: 12.834 m (42 ft 1 1/4 in)
- Length: 17.12 m (56 ft 2 in)
- Width: 2.864 m (9 ft 4 3/4 in)
- Height: 4.185 m (13 ft 8 3/4 in)
- Axle load: 17,800 kg (39,200 lb)
- Loco weight: 96,000 kg (212,000 lb)
- Fuel type: diesel
- Fuel capacity: 5,000 L (1,100 imp gal; 1,300 US gal)
- Prime mover: ALCO 251-B
- RPM range: 400–1000 rpm
- Engine type: V12 diesel
- Traction motors: BHEL 4906 BZ and 4907 AZ
- Cylinders: 12
- Cylinder size: 228 mm × 266 mm (8.98 in × 10.47 in) bore×stroke
- Transmission: Diesel–electric transmission
- MU working: 2 units
- Train brakes: Air, Vacuum and Dual
Performance figures
- Maximum speed: 105 km/h (65 mph)
- Power output: Max: 2,000 hp (1,500 kW); Site rated: 1,800 hp (1,300 kW)
- Tractive effort: 25.3 t (25 long tons; 28 short tons)
Career
- Operators: Indian Railways
- Numbers: 11001-11015
- Locale: Southern Railway
- Preserved: 1 unit (#11001)
- Disposition: A single unit still in service, rest withdrawn or scrapped

The WDM-7 is a diesel–electric locomotive of Indian Railways. It has been manufactured by Banaras Locomotive Works (BLW), Varanasi. The model name stands for broad gauge (W), diesel (D), mixed traffic (M) engine.

These units have been retro-fitted with air brakes, in addition to the original vacuum brakes. The WDM-7 locos have a maximum speed of 105 km/h (65 mph), restricted to 100 km/h (62 mph) when run long hood forward - the gear ratio is 94:17.

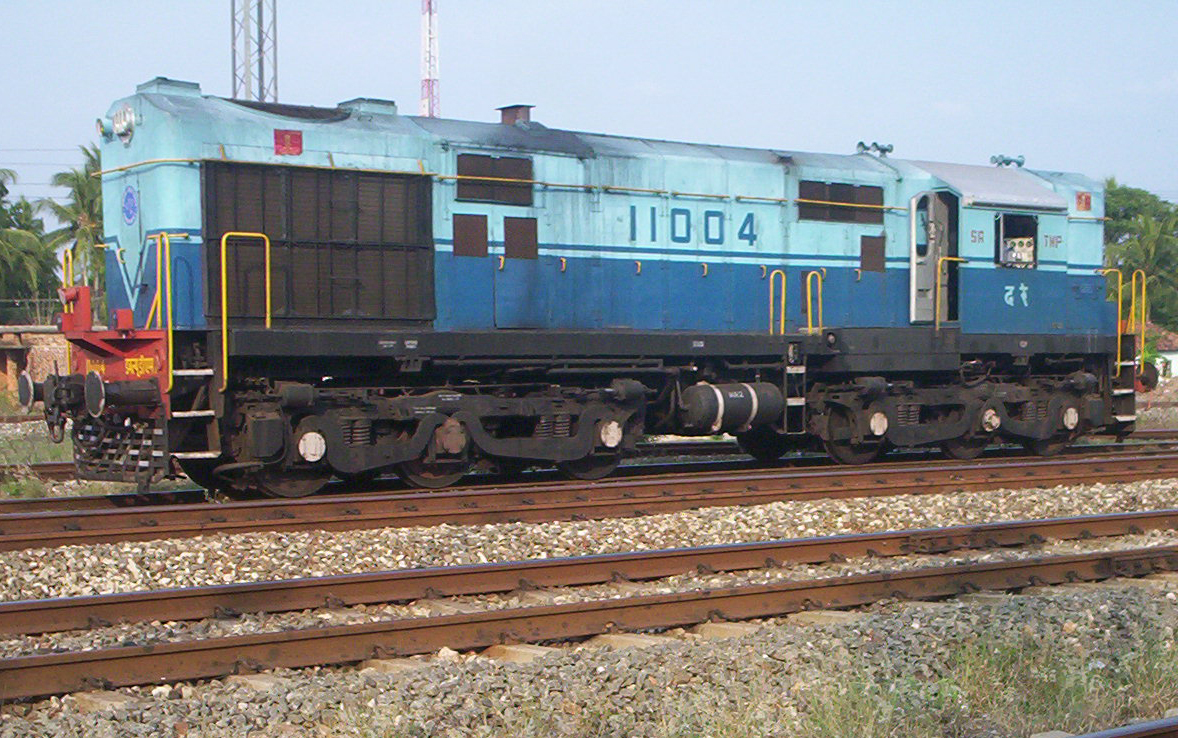
TNP WDM-7 resting in siding

== History ==
Fifteen of these locomotives (road numbers #11001 to #11015) were built from 1987 to 1989 as a low-powered, “lightweight” version of the original ALCO. Like the WDM-6, the IR wanted a lower powered locomotive to handle small rake local and passenger services. However, all sheds declined them and they ended up at Ernakulam where they were used to handle local and shuttle services with good degrees of efficiency. Becoming aware of their abilities, the Southern Railway moved all the WDM-7s out of Ernakulam to Tondiarpet, where they are housed there as of 2023. These days, they are seen being used as shunters at Chennai Central or for light passenger haulage. One (#11008) has been modified to run on bio-diesel.

These Co-Co diesel-electric locomotives were designed primarily for branch-line duties (top speed 105 km/h). They have two 3-axle bogies. The power-pack is a 12-cylinder Alco 251B unit. They are a lower-powered variant of the WDM-2 (the latter produces 2600 hp of usable power, as opposed to the WDM-7 which produces 2000 hp). They were formerly housed at Erode and Ernakulam as well. They are reliable and rugged locomotives even though low-powered. They can be easily recognised by the lack of grilles on the short hood; in fact, they look exactly the same as the WDM-2 except for the “clean” short-hood-forward nose without grilles. Two locos operated on a mixture of bio-diesel and diesel. Retirement and scrapping of these locomotives began in March 2025. As of November 2025, a single unit out of the 15 locomotives built is still in service.

== Locomotive shed ==
Zone	Name	Shed Code	Quantity
SR	Golden Rock	GOC	1
Total Locomotives Active as of November 2025			1

=== Former ===
- Ernakulam
- Erode
- Tondiarpet

== Preserved examples ==
A single WDM-7 locomotive has been earmarked for preservation by IR.

Class	Manufacturer	Loco Number	Previous shed	Name	Livery	Location	ref
WDM-7	BLW	11001	Golden Rock (GOC)		TNP blue/dark blue/blue	Earmarked for preservation: I.R. Heritage Website [November 2018]	

== See also ==
- Indian locomotive class WDM-2
- List of diesel locomotives of India
- Rail transport in India
- Rail transport in India#History
