= Diesel Loco Shed, Ernakulam =

Loco shed in Kerala, India

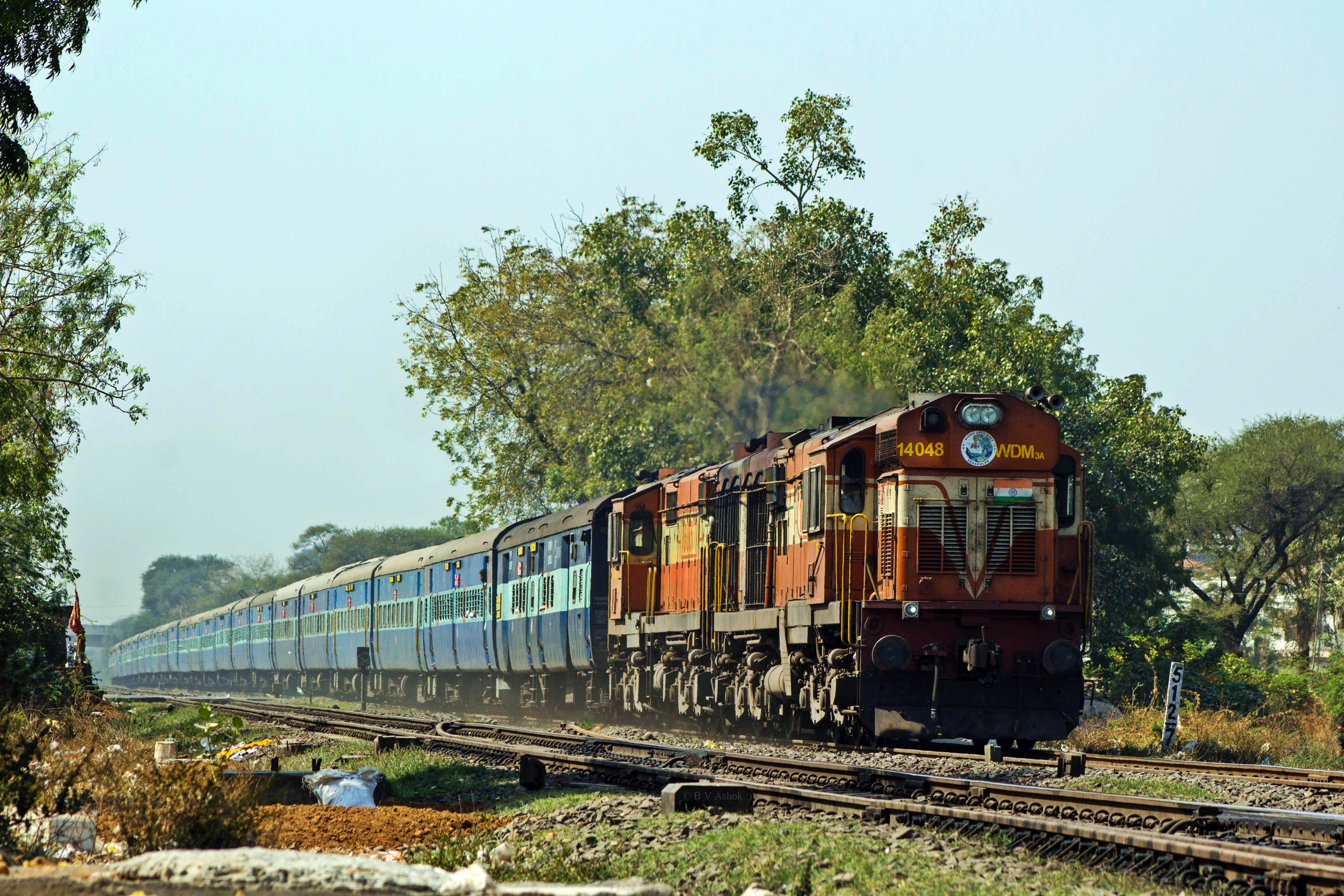
- ERS based WDM-3A twins hauling Okha - Ernakulam Express.

- Location within Kerala

Location
- Location: Karshaka Road, Kadavanthra, Kochi, Kerala, India
- Coordinates: 9.9733°N 76.2910°E

Characteristics
- Owner: Indian Railways
- Operator: Southern Railway zone
- Depot code: ERSX
- Type: Engine shed
- Rolling stock: WDM-3A; WDG-3A; WDM-3D; WDG-4; WDG-4D; WAG-5
- Routes served: Southern Railway and others

History
- Opened: 1981; 45 years ago
- Former rolling stock: WDM-2; WDS-6; WDM-7; WAP-1; WDP-4D

Diesel Loco Shed, Ernakulam (Code:ERSX) is a motive power depot performing locomotive maintenance and repair facility for diesel and electric locomotives of the Indian Railways, located at Ernakulam Junction (ERS) of the Southern Railway zone in the city of Kochi, Kerala. It is one of the four diesel loco sheds of the Southern Railway, the others being at Tondiarpet (TNP) at Chennai, Erode (ED) and Golden Rock (GOC) at Trichy and the only locomotive shed in Kerala and the southernmost loco shed in India. Although it is located in Kerala, its locomotives were mainly used in Goa and Maharashtra, and very rarely near the shed for passenger trains. As Indian railway approaches 100% electrification, the diesel loco shed has lost its significance.

== History ==
Steam locomotive sheds used to exist at Kollam Junction (QLN) and Shoranur Junction (SRR) until the late 1970s. After Southern Railway set a deadline to eliminate all steam locomotive operations by 1985, a push was given towards establishing diesel as the primary motive power, and the Ernakulam Diesel locomotive shed was established in the year 1981 to meet these ends and the needs of exponentially increasing rail traffic on the new continuous broad-gauge lines from Trivandrum to Mangalore and Palakkad with the completion of gauge conversion of the Ernakulam – Kottayam – Kollam line. The steam sheds at SRR and QLN were subsequently decommissioned.

Initially, the shed handed only WDM-2 and WDS-6 class locomotives, but gradually were allocated WDM-3As, WDG3-As and for a short time, was the only loco shed in the country to have WDM-7 locomotives allocated to its roster. The first loco to be homed at ERS was a WDS-6 with road number #36012. The last WDM-2 (18701) was removed from service in June 2019 after being in the shed for 38 years. The WDS-6 locomotives of the shed were scrapped in 2020 due to their age and poor performance. WDM-7 locomotives of the shed were transferred to Tondiarpet in 2009 and 2010. The shed received its First HHP loco WDP-4D(40114) from GOC in December 2019. Electric locomotives were gradually allotted to the shed in 2021.

== Operations ==
Like all locomotive sheds, ERS does regular maintenance, overhaul and repair including painting and washing of locomotives. It not only attends to locomotives housed at ERS but to ones coming in from other sheds as well. It has four pit lines for loco repair.

Locomotives of Ernakulam DLS along with Erode and Golden Rock DLS were the regular links for all trains running through Kerala until around the year 2000 when widespread electrification of railway lines started in Kerala. Until then it handled prestigious trains like the double-headed Kerala Express and the Trivandrum Rajdhani Express. ERS locomotives used to be predominantly the regular links for trains traveling on the Konkan Railway as well. As more and more railway lines in Kerala were electrified, ERS started losing links to electric locomotives, mainly WAP-1, WAP-4, WAG-7 and WAP-7 locomotives from the Erode (ED), Arakkonam (AJJ) and Royapuram (RPM) electric locomotive sheds. The Thiruvananthapuram railway division in which ERS is located has 100% electrified lines.

Despite all the electrification across the country, ERS locomotives still used to take trains as far as Gujarat, Bikaner and in the Shornur–Nilambur line of Kerala. The Ernakulam–Okha Express used to run with two ERS locomotives in multiple unit operation before electrification. The 12201/12202 LTT–Kochuveli Garib Rath was an ERS link running south of Ernakulam. A prestigious link for ERS was the Dadar–Madgaon Jan Shatabdi Express which was regularly hauled by an ERS WDM-3A for a long time.

== Livery and markings ==
Indian Railways allows diesel loco sheds to paint their locomotives in their own unique liveries. Ernakulam's locomotives have their current livery scheme as painted in orange with a wide cream band around the middle, with orange lines on the top and bottom, to match with the erstwhile Rajdhani livery. The livery was introduced to match that of the Trivandrum Rajdhani when it was introduced sometime in 1997 as ERS considered the Rajdhani its most prestigious link. The cream bar and the orange line taper downwards at both ends of the locomotive to create a V-shaped design. This orange–cream–orange color scheme gives the locomotives a cheerful and pleasant look. One locomotive, WDM-3A #16666 was for a short time painted in an experimental light green–cream–light green scheme. Originally, the livery scheme of the Ernakulam shed was yellow at the top and spinach-green at the bottom. Ernakulam DLS has its own logo and stencils. It is written on loco's body side as well as front & back side.

== Closure controversy ==
In October 2013, Southern Railways submitted a proposal to the railway board to shut down the Ernakulam DLS and convert it into an electric loco shed. Employees at the loco shed, later joined in by the public and people's representatives protested against this decision, alleging a plan to move the shed to Mangalore, demanding the ELS should be established without closing the DLS as it was the only major railway establishment in Kerala. After protests got much popular support, Southern Railway backed down from its move to close the shed.

== Electrification of Shed ==
Electrification work at Ernakulam Diesel Shed started on 21 January 2021.Work was completed in November 2021 and trial run of electric locomotives was completed on 31 December 2021. WAP-1 #22008 of Erode was used for the trial run. From 22 Jan 2022 onwards, it started receiving WAP-1 and WAG-5 electric locomotives.

The WAP-1 locomotives housed at the shed were transferred back to Erode. In January 2025, all 5 of the WAG-5 electric locomotives housed at the shed at that time were transferred to Erode, citing the lack of infrastructure at the shed for maintaining electric locomotives. The shed didn't receive electric locomotives again until March 2026, when 18 WAG-5 locomotives were transferred to the shed from Vishakapatnam.

== Locomotives ==
Serial No.	Locomotives	Horsepower	Quantity
1.	WDM-3A	3100	5
2.	WDG-3A	3100	7
3.	WDM-3D	3300	3
4.	WDG-4	4500	23
5.	WDG-4D	4500	1
6.	WAG-5	3800	18
Total locomotives active as of April 2026			57

== See also ==
- Electric Loco Shed, Arakkonam
- Electric Loco Shed, Erode
- Electric Loco Shed, Royapuram
- Diesel Loco Shed, Erode
- Diesel Loco Shed, Golden Rock
- Diesel Loco Shed, Tondiarpet
