= Indian locomotive class WAGC3/WAG-10 =

Class of Indian electric locomotives

WAGC-3/WAG-10
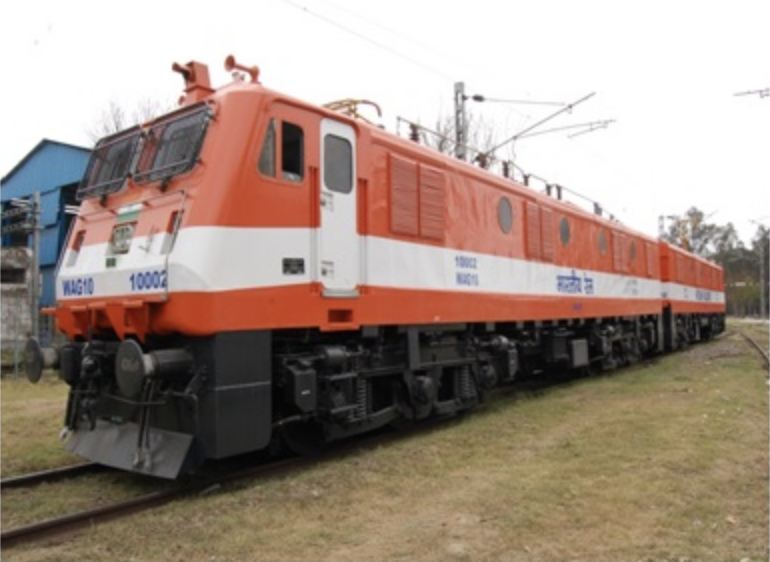
- Bondamunda based WAG-10 at PLW, Patiala
Type and origin
- Power type: Electric
- Designer: Banaras Locomotive Works
- Builder: Banaras Locomotive Works, Diesel-Loco Modernisation Works
- Rebuilder: Banaras Locomotive Works, Diesel-Loco Modernisation Works
- Rebuild date: 2018, 2021
- Number rebuilt: 2
Specifications
- Configuration
  - AAR: C-C+C-C
  - UIC: Co'Co+Co'Co'
  - Commonwealth: Co+Co+Co+Co
- Gauge: 5 ft 6 in (1,676 mm)
- Electric system/s: 25 kv AC OHLE
- Current pickup: Pantograph
Performance figures
- Power output: 10,000 hp (7,457 kW)
Career
- Operators: Indian Railways
- Class: WAGC-3; WAG-10
- Locale: South Eastern Railway zone
- First run: 2018
- Disposition: In service

The WAGC-3, also known as WAG-10, is a class of 25 kv AC electric locomotive rebuilt by Banaras Locomotive Works (BLW). It can deliver 10,000 hp (7457 kW). The locomotive was rebuilt from a WDG-3A diesel locomotive.

The name stands for broad gauge (W), alternating current (A), goods service (G), and converted (C).

== History ==
In 2018, Chittaranjan Locomotive Works, Banaras Locomotive Works and Research Design and Standards Organisation converted a WDG-3A into a purely electric, twin-section 10,000 hp (7,457 kW) locomotive, classified as the WAGC3. This locomotive was the result of the initiative taken up by the Railway Board in November 2017, asking RDSO to work out details of conversion of diesel locos to electric locos. RDSO had suggested that such conversion would be possible with retaining the Motorized Truck assembly (which includes traction motors and drive side traction converters), computer controlled brakes (CCBs) and other relevant parts, suitably redesigning the under-frame and superstructure and adding the conversion kit. It was completed in only 69 days. Both units will together be considered as one asset and one locomotive by Indian Railways. Only a single unit has been produced so far and it is in service. It has been given to Bondamumda Shed of SER.

== Locomotive shed ==
Zone	Name	Shed Code	Quantity
South Eastern Railway	Bondamunda	BNDM	2
Total Locomotives Active as of March 2026			2

== See also ==
- Locomotives of India
- Indian Railways
- Rail transport in India
