= Diesel Loco Shed, Tondiarpet =

Loco shed in Tamilnadu, India

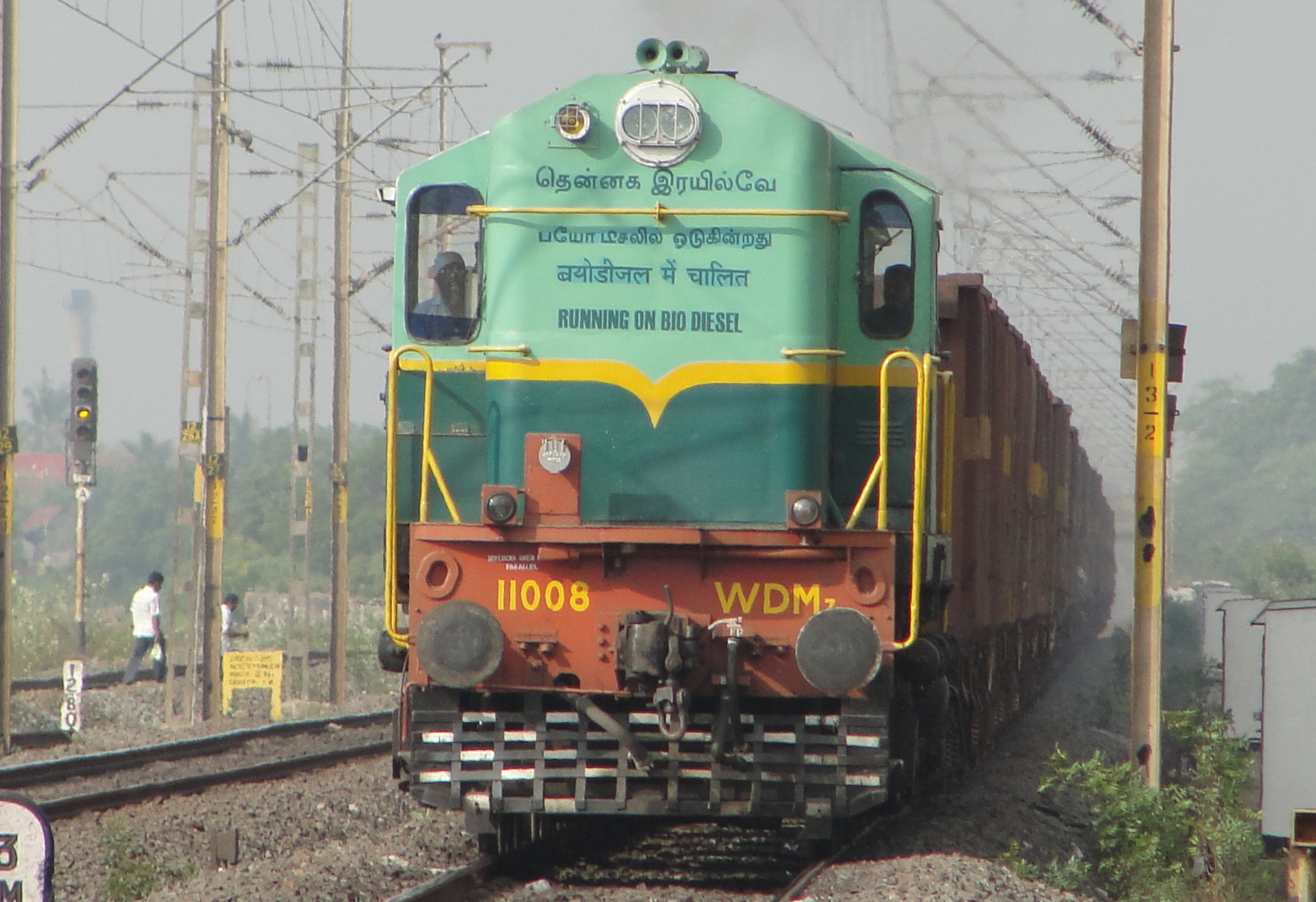
- TNP based WDM-7 (running on bio diesel) at Perambur
- Interactive map of Diesel Loco Shed, Tondiarpet

Location
- Location: Tondiarpet, Chennai, Tamil Nadu, India
- Coordinates: 13.1268°N 80.2815°E

Characteristics
- Owner: Indian Railways
- Operator: Southern Railway zone
- Depot code: TNPD
- Type: Engine shed
- Rolling stock: WDM 3A, WDG 3A, WDS 6, WDG 4, WDG 4D

History
- Opened: 1972; 54 years ago

Diesel Loco Shed, Tondiarpet is a motive power depot performing locomotive maintenance and repair facility for diesel locomotives of the Indian Railways. It is located near Tondiarpet railway station (TNP) of the Southern Railway zone in the city of Chennai, Tamil Nadu and is one of the four diesel loco sheds of the Southern Railway, the others being at Ernakulam (ERS) at Kochi, Erode (ED) and Golden Rock (GOC) at Trichy.

== History and developments ==
On 25 December 1971, the then Railway Minister, K. Hanumanthaiya, laid the foundation stone for the loco shed. After four years of construction, it was finally opened in 1975 with a total area of 169,000 square metres (170,000 m^{2}) and covered area of 19,600 square metres (20,000 m^{2}). It initially homed YDM-4 class MG locomotives, and was once expanded in 1993 to hold Broad Gauge locomotives and again in 2000 to accommodate more than 100 locos.

Tondiarpet diesel loco shed is located to the north of the station. The diesel shed was commissioned in October 1972. Earlier a steam shed used to exist with 14 WG locomotives, but this shed was decommissioned and subsequently demolished to make way for the diesel shed. The new diesel shed got a batch of WDS-4B diesel locomotives as its first locomotives. These locomotives were used for shunting in the marshalling yard at Tondiarpet, the goods sheds at Royapuram, Salt Cotaurs, and the coaching depot at Basin Bridge in Chennai division. later the number of WDS-4B locomotives was increased to 64 for meeting increasing demand in Trichi, Palakkad, Bangalore, Thiruvananthapuram, Mysore divisions and ICF, Perambur. As the WDS-4 fleet began to reach the end of their serviceable life, WDM-7 locomotives were transferred from Ernakulam and put into service on both passenger and yard shunting work. In April 2007, mainline WDM2-model from Erode locomotives were additionally inducted for hauling goods. Currently, the shed holds 9 WDG-3A, 14 WDM-3A, 18 WDS-6, 8 WDG-4 and 6 WDG-4D

The shed has a total area of 75,000 sq m, including a covered area of 6,652 sq m, and has a capacity of 50 locomotives. The shed employs about 378 persons.

In 2024, the shed was given an increase in its horsepower, with the allotment of three WDG-4 (EMD GT46ACe 4500 HP version) locomotives, transferred from Ponmalai Golden Rock (GOC), thereby marking Chennai Division's first three EMD locomotives. As of November 2025, eleven more WDG-4 locomotives (five single-cab WDG-4, and six dual-cab WDG-4D (JT46ACe)) have been allotted to the shed by transferring them from various sheds, totalling the count to fourteen EMD locos.

== Operations ==
The shed, headed by Senior Divisional Mechanical Engineer (Diesel), has about 750 employees in different ranks in the day-to-day operations of the shed, which include periodical overhaul, maintenance and repair works. The locos of this shed were thoroughly traverses over entire South India for passenger and freight services. Like all locomotive sheds, TNP does regular maintenance, overhaul and repair including painting and washing of locomotives. It not only attends to locomotives housed at TNP but to ones coming in from other sheds as well. It has four pit lines for loco repair.

Locomotives of Tondiarpet DLS along with Erode and Golden Rock DLS were the regular links for all trains running through Tamil Nadu, even though widespread electrification of railway lines started in Tamil Nadu. TNP locomotives used to be predominantly the regular links for trains traveling on the Konkan Railway as well. As more and more railway lines in Tamil Nadu were electrified, TNP started losing links to electric locomotives, mainly WAP-1, WAP-4, WAG-7 and WAP-7 locomotives from the Erode (ED), Arakkonam (AJJ) and Royapuram (RPM) electric locomotive sheds.

== Livery and markings ==
Indian Railways allows diesel loco sheds to paint their locomotives in their own unique liveries. Tondiarpet's locomotives have their current livery scheme painted in light blue with a wide cream band around the middle, with dark blue lines on the top and bottom, to match with the ICF livery. The dark blue bar and the light blue line taper downwards at both ends of the locomotive to create a V-shaped design. One locomotive, WDM-7A #11008 was painted in an experimental light green-cream-light green scheme.

== Locomotives ==
Serial No.	Locomotive Class	Horsepower	Quantity
1.	WDM-3A	3100	14
2.	WDG-3A	3100	9
3.	WDS-6	1400	18
4.	WDG-4/4D	4500	14
Total Locomotives Active as of June 2026			55

== Images ==
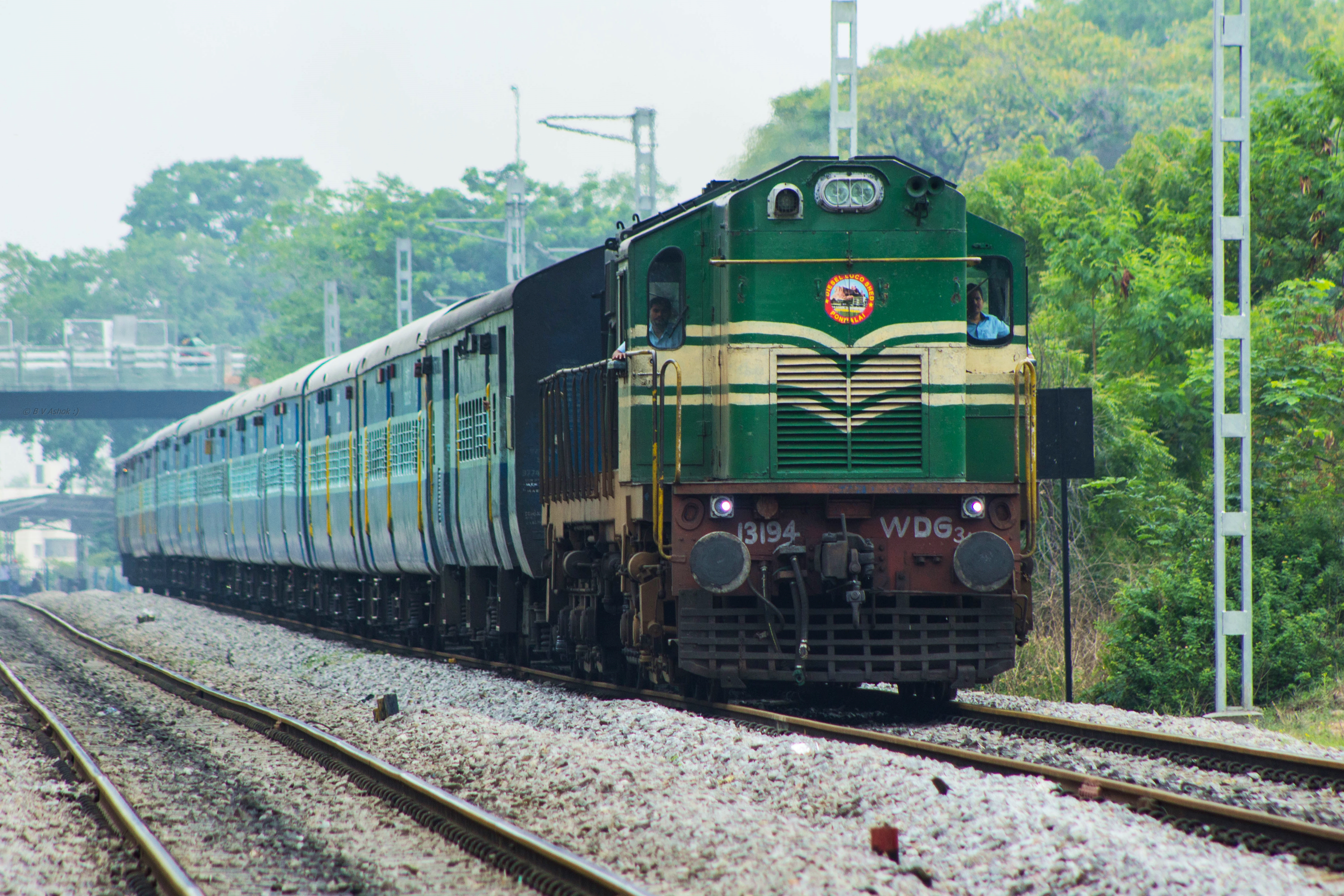
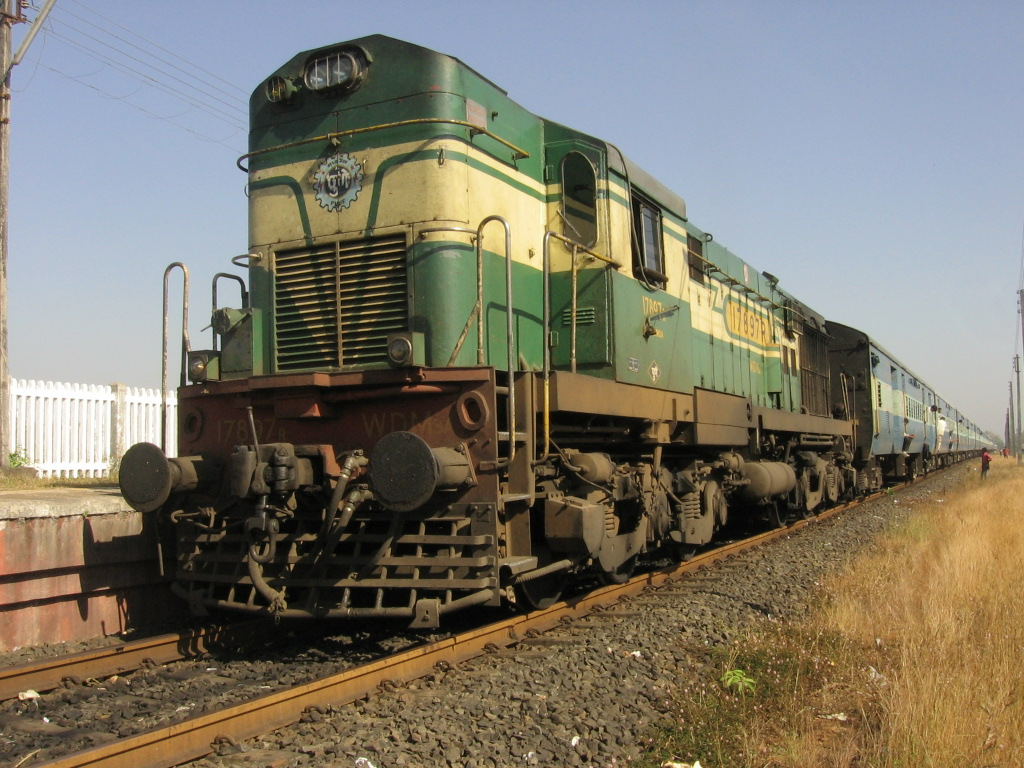
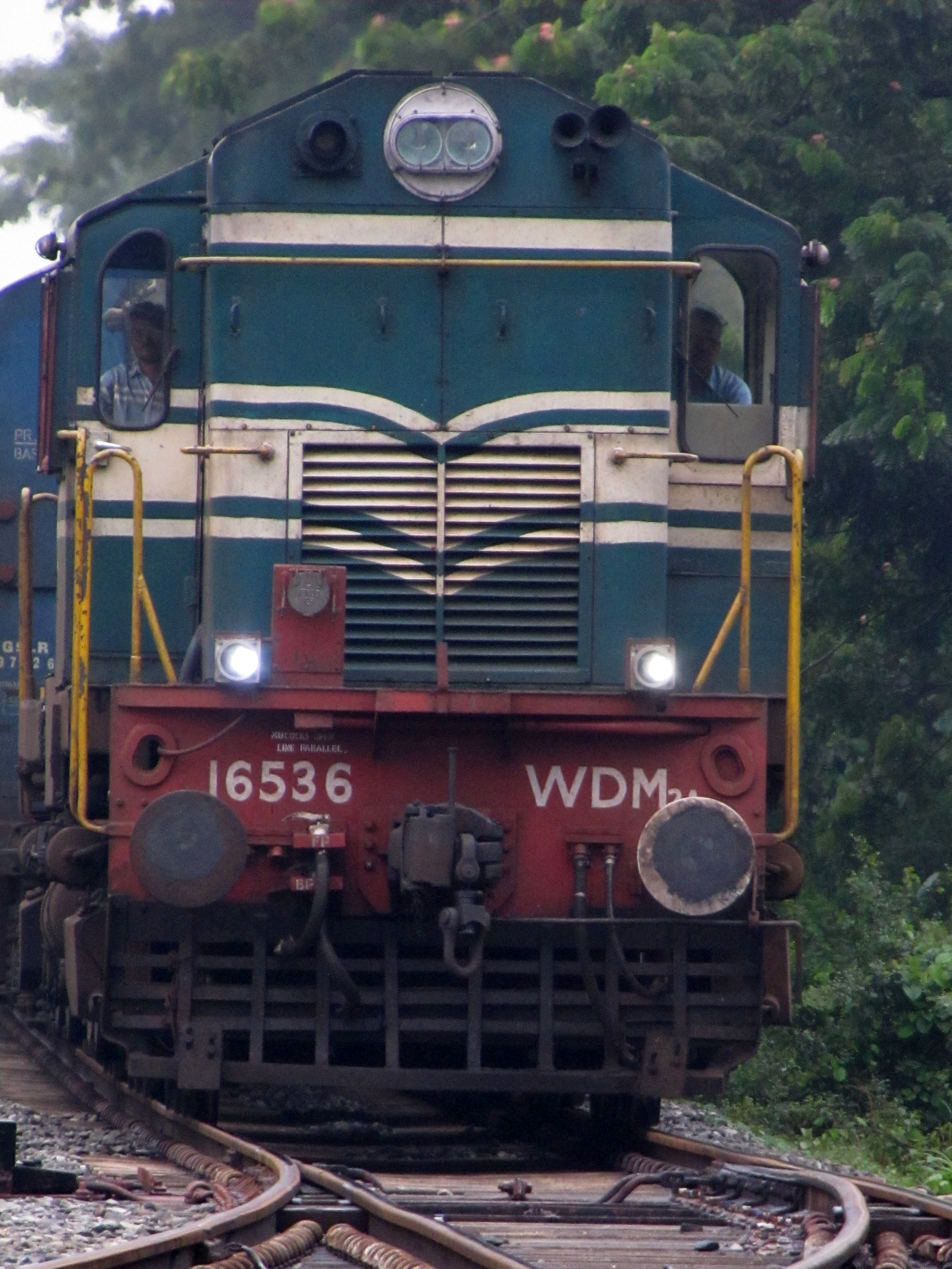
