= Diesel Loco Shed, Erode =

Loco shed in Tamilnadu, India

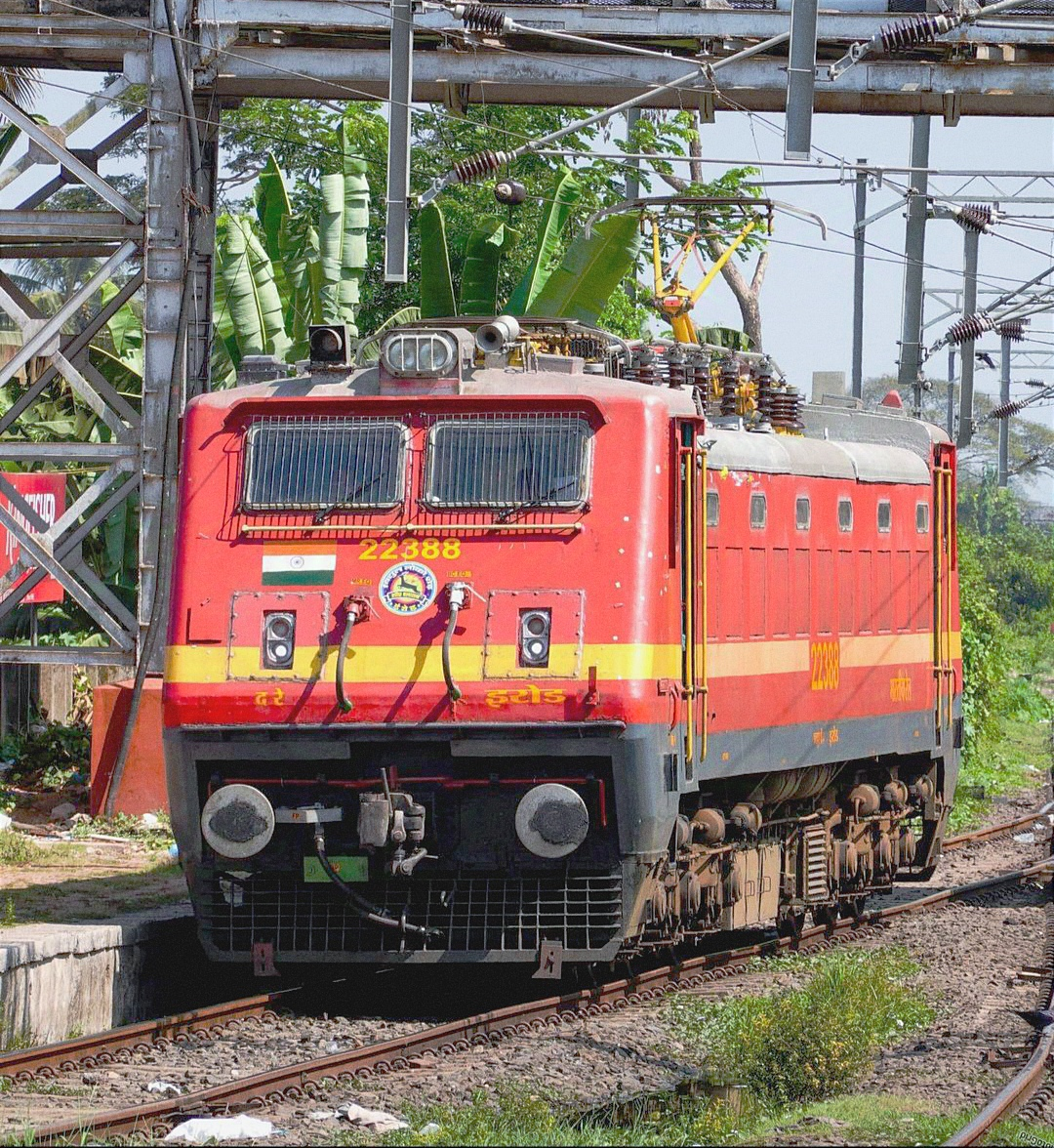
- Erode (D) based WAP-4 at Madgaon.
- Interactive map of Diesel Loco Shed, Erode

Location
- Location: Erode–Chennimalai Road, Erode, Tamil Nadu, India
- Coordinates: 11.3249°N 77.7174°E

Characteristics
- Owner: Indian Railways
- Operator: Southern Railway zone
- Depot code: EDDX
- Type: Engine shed
- Roads: 6
- Rolling stock: WAP-1; WAP-4; WAG-5; WAG-7

History
- Opened: September 1966; 60 years ago
- Former rolling stock: WDM-2; WDS-6; WDM-7; WDM-3A; WDG-3A; WDM-3D; WDP-4D; WDG-4

Diesel Loco Shed, Erode is an engine shed located on Erode–Chennimalai road in Erode, Tamil Nadu, India. Being closely located to Erode Junction Railway Station, the shed falls under Salem railway division of Southern Railway zone.

== History ==
The shed was opened and became operationally active since September 1966, spreading over a total area of 59,000 m^{2} and covered area of 7,500 m^{2}.

== Operations ==
Being one of the four diesel engine sheds in Southern Railway under the territory of Salem railway division, various major and minor maintenance schedules of diesel locomotives are being carried out here. Apart from serving the parent division, the locos belonging to the shed also serves the unelectrified routes of Madurai railway division, in addition to locos from Golden Rock. To provide space for electric locomotives, all the EMDs (WDG-4 and WDP-4D), WDM-3A and WDG-3A were transferred to Golden Rock. Currently, no services are hauled by Erode diesels. As of November 2025, Diesel Loco Shed Erode only holds electric locomotives.

== Livery and markings ==
Erode DLS has its own logo and stencils. It is written on loco's body side as well as front & back side.

== Locomotives ==
Serial No.	Locomotive Class	Horsepower	Quantity
1.	WAP-1	3800	14
2.	WAP-4	5050	86
3.	WAG-5	3850	46
4.	WAG-7	5350	28
Total locomotives active as of November 2026			174

== See also ==
- Diesel Loco Shed, Ernakulam
- Diesel Loco Shed, Golden Rock
- Diesel Loco Shed, Tondiarpet
