= Indian locomotive class WDG-3A =

Indian Railway class diesel locomotive

WDG-3A
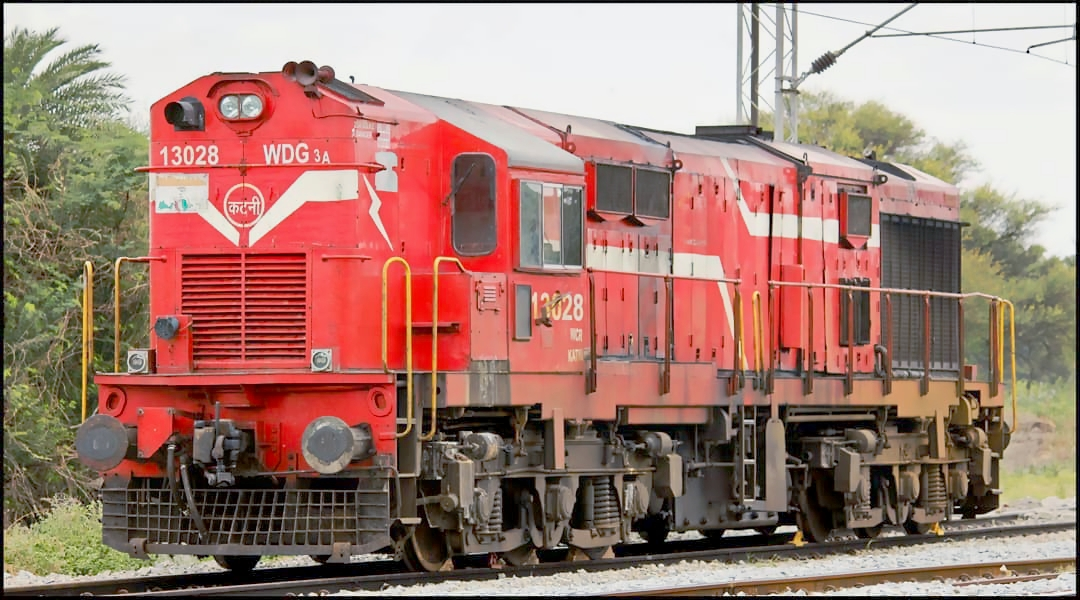
- Katni based WDG-3A at Bangarpet Jn.
Type and origin
- Power type: Diesel
- Builder: BLW, Diesel Loco Modernisation Works
- Model: ALCO 251C/ALCO DL560C variant
- Build date: 1994–2015
- Total produced: 1,998
- Rebuilder: Diesel Loco Modernisation Works, Patiala
Specifications
- Configuration
  - UIC: Co-Co
- Gauge: 1,676 mm (5 ft 6 in)
- Bogies: High adhesion Fabricated bogies
- Wheel diameter: 1,092 mm (3 ft 7 in)
- Wheelbase: 12.834 m (42 ft 1 1/4 in)
- Length: 17.85 m (58 ft 6 3/4 in)
- Width: 3.016 m (9 ft 10 3/4 in)
- Height: 4.162 m (13 ft 7 7/8 in)
- Axle load: 23,500 kg (51,800 lb)
- Loco weight: 127 t (125 long tons; 140 short tons)
- Fuel type: Diesel
- Fuel capacity: 6,000 L (1,300 imp gal; 1,600 US gal)
- Prime mover: ALCO 251-C
- RPM range: 400–1050 RPM
- Engine type: V16 Diesel engine
- Aspiration: ABB VTC304-15 or Napier NA 295 IR turbocharger
- Traction motors: BHEL TA 10102 CW (new), BHEL TG 10931 AZ(old)
- Cylinders: 16
- Cylinder size: 228 mm × 266 mm (8.98 in × 10.47 in) bore x stroke
- Transmission: Diesel electric
- MU working: 2
- Loco brake: Air dynamic brake
- Train brakes: Air, Vacuum and Dual
Performance figures
- Maximum speed: 105 km/h (65 mph)
- Power output: WDG-3A: 3,100 hp (2,300 kW)
- Tractive effort: 37.90 t (37 long tons; 42 short tons)
- Factor of adh.: 0.33
Career
- Operators: Indian Railways
- Numbers: 14501-14999, Newer 13000-13665
- Nicknames: Shakti, Prabal, Jai Jawan
- Locale: throughout Indian Railways
- First run: 1994
- Retired: Early 2020s–present
- Preserved: 1
- Disposition: In service

The Indian locomotive class WDG-3A is a class of diesel–electric locomotive that was developed in 1994 by Banaras Locomotive Works (BLW),Varanasi for Indian Railways. The model name stands for broad-gauge (W), Diesel (D), Goods traffic (G) engine, 3,100 hp (3A) locomotive. They entered service on 18 July 1995. A total of 1,164 WDG-3A units were built between 1994 and 2015 at BLW, Varanasi with a few units being produced by Diesel Loco Modernisation Works (DLMW) and Parel Workshop.

It is the dedicated freight version of the WDM-2 and shares the same engine and horsepower with WDM-3A. It is a locomotive class train with high reliability and few maintenance problems usually. Due to the introduction of more modern locomotives like WDG-4 and electric trains, a significant number of locomotives have been withdrawn from use and scrapped. Yet a good number of WGD-3As are active on the mainline railway and for other services.

As of September 2026, 375 locomotives still retain "operational status" on the mainline as WDG-3A, with a few examples having been converted to WAGC-3 or WAG-10.

== History ==
The first units of this class was delivered on July 18, 1995, under the name of WDG-2. The class was manufactured till end of 2015. All the older locomotives built by DLW had regular WDM-2 type square short hood profile and control stand position and the locomotives are rated at 3,100 HP.

From 2009 onward, they are equipped with Daulat Ram DBR, microprocessor control and an Auxiliary Power Unit (APU) in the short hood thus they bear external resemblance to the WDM-3D class. The WDG-3A has a higher tractive effort (7.5 t more) and axle load (1.7 t) compared to the WDM3A despite having the same engine and horsepower rating. Many units of this class has been named "Shakti" and can easily be recognized by their orange livery with cream stripe and lightning bolts. Besides Indian Railways, WDG-3A are being use by private companies for industrial uses, thermal power plants, port trusts, etc.

Production was stopped in 2015 when advanced locomotives like the WDG-4D were built, thus rendering the ALCO platform obsolete. Two WDG-4s can haul more goods than three WDG-3A combined. Meanwhile, Diesel Loco Works in Varanasi rebuilt few of the existing locomotives that had reached midlife into a purely electric twin section 10,000 hp (7,457 kW) locomotive, classifying them as the WAG-C3/WAG-10.

== Sub Classes ==
=== WDG-3B ===
They were an experimental technical variant of the WDG3A with an upgraded ALCO engine to output 3,200 hp, though it was unsuccessful, and all units were reverted to normal WDG-3A. One of the locomotives of this class was numbered #14796.

=== WDG-3C ===
Another experimental class, but this time rated at 3300 hp. Only one unit (#14962) was produced and was painted in a unique "Dark Rose/Cheetah" livery. This loco was derated to 2,600 hp, but is still with the Katni diesel locomotive shed. This class was unsuccessful as well.

=== WDG-3D ===
Freight version of the WDM-3D. Only one (#13301) unit was marked with this marking. It may possibly be rated at 3400 hp. Now it has been derated to 2600 hp with WDG-3A class markings and homed at the Vatva Loco Shed.

== Locomotive sheds ==
Zone	Name	Shed Code	Quantity
Central Railway	Pune	PADX	10
Central Railway	Kalyan	KYDX	12
Central Railway	Kurla	CLAD	26
Eastern Railway	Andal	UDLD	4
Eastern Railway	Jamalpur	JMPD	40
East Central Railway	Pt. Deendayal Upadhyaya	DDUX	9
East Central Railway	Samastipur	SPJD	17
Northern Railway	Ludhiana	LDHD	48
Northern Railway	Lucknow	AMVD	25
Northern Railway	Tughlakabad	TKDD	10
North Central Railway	Jhansi	JHSD	18
North Eastern Railway	Izzatnagar	IZND	1
North Western Railway	Abu Road	ABRD	9
Southern Railway	Ernakulam	ERSX	7
Southern Railway	Golden Rock	GOCD	8
Southern Railway	Tondiarpet	TNPD	9
South Central Railway	Moula Ali	MLYD	5
South Coast Railway zone	Visakhapatnam	WATD	1
South Coast Railway zone	Gooty	GYD	1
South Eastern Railway	Bondamunda	BNDX	21
South East Central Railway	Raipur	RPDX	34
Western Railway	Ratlam	RTMD	31
Western Railway	Sabarmati	SBTD	21
West Central Railway	New Katni Jn.	NKJD	8
Total Locomotives Active as of November 2026			375

== Technical specifications ==
Technical details are as follows:

Manufacturers	DLW
Engine	Alco 251-C, 16 cylinder, 3,100 hp (2,300 kW), (3,007 hp or 2,242 kW site rating, earlier 2,900 hp (2,200 kW)) with Napier NA2951R/ ABB VTC-304-VG15/ GE 7s 1716 turbo supercharged engine. 1,050 rpm max, 400 rpm idle; 228.6 mm × 266.7 mm (9.00 in × 10.50 in) bore x stroke; compression ratio 12.5:1. Direct fuel injection, centrifugal pump cooling system (2,457 L/min (540 imp gal/min; 649 US gal/min) at 1,050 rpm), fan driven by eddy current clutch (90 hp or 67 kW at 1,050 rpm)
Governor	EDC / Woodward 8574-650
Transmission	Electric, with BHEL TA 10102 CW alternator (1,050 rpm, 1,100 V, 4,400 amperes) (Earlier used BHEL TG 10931 AZ alternator)
Traction motors	BHEL TM 4906 AZ/ 4907 BZ (435 hp or 324 kW) (with roller bearings)
Axle load	18.8 tonnes (18.5 long tons; 20.7 short tons), total weight 112.8 t (111.0 long tons; 124.3 short tons)
Bogies	Alco High Adhesion Fabricated Bogies
Starting TE	40 t (39 long tons; 44 short tons) at adhesion 30.8%, continuous 37.05 t (36.46 long tons; 40.84 short tons)
Length over buffer beams	17,850 mm (58 ft 6 3/4 in)
Distance between bogies	11,500 mm (37 ft 8 3/4 in)

== See also ==
- Indian locomotive class WDM-3A
- Indian locomotive class WDM-2
- List of diesel locomotives of India
- Indian Railways
- Rail transport in India
