= Diesel Loco Shed, Golden Rock =

Loco shed in Tamil Nadu, India

Ponmalai Diesel Loco Shed, Golden Rock
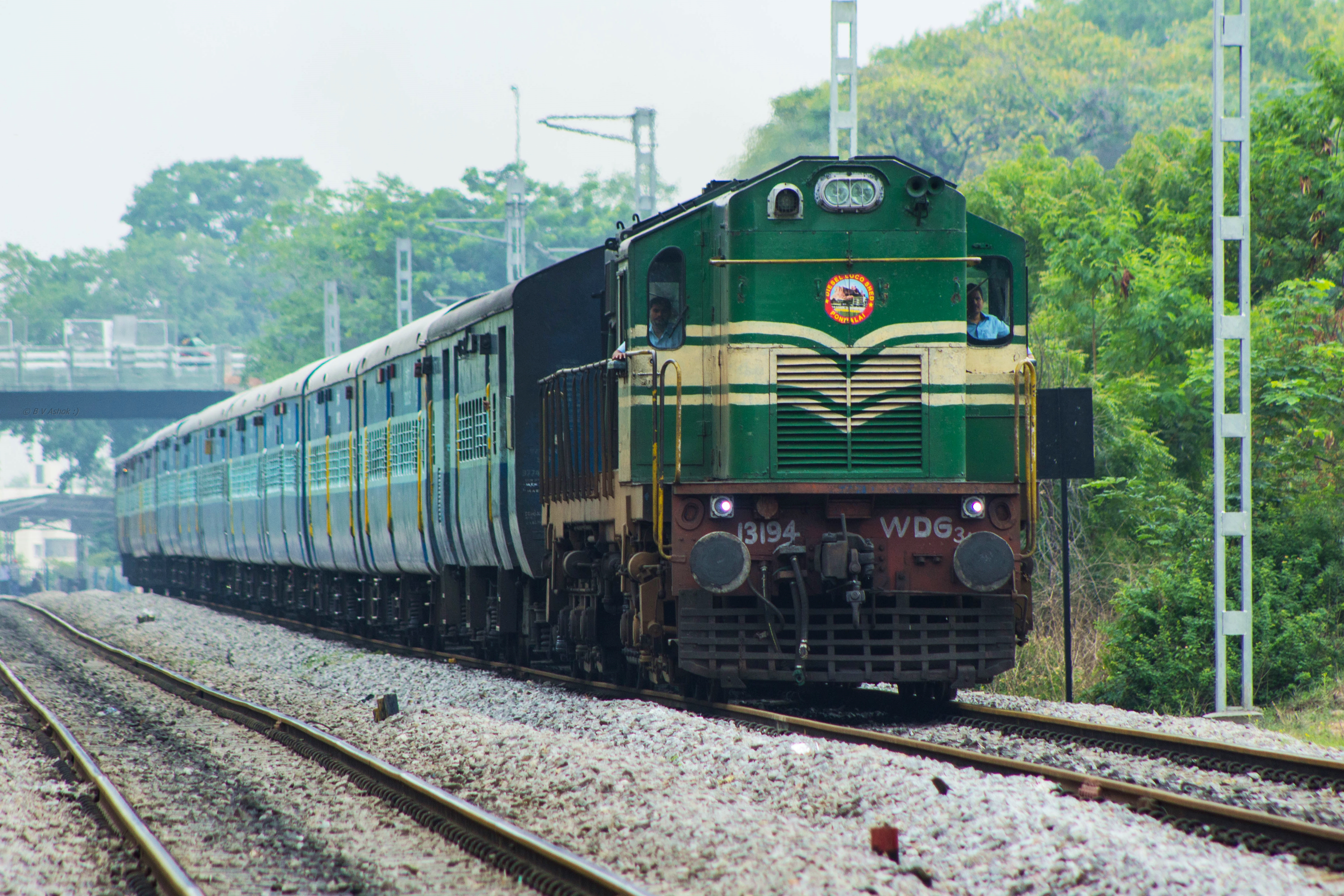
- GOC based WDG-3A hauling Bolarum-Hyderabad Passenger cruising near Alwal.
- Interactive map of Ponmalai Diesel Loco Shed, Golden Rock

Location
- Location: Golden Rock, Tiruchirappalli, Tamil Nadu, India
- Coordinates: 10.7932°N 78.7107°E

Characteristics
- Owner: Indian Railways
- Operator: Southern Railway zone
- Depot code: GOCD
- Type: Engine shed
- Rolling stock: WDM-2, WDM-3A, WDG-3A, WDP-3A, WDM-3D, WDG-4, WDP-4B, WDP-4D, WDG-4D & YDM-4

History
- Opened: 1971; 55 years ago

Diesel Loco Shed, Golden Rock is an engine shed located in Golden Rock, Tiruchirappalli, Tamil Nadu in India. It is located north of Golden Rock railway station, falling under Tiruchirappalli railway division. It is the largest of the four locomotive sheds under the Southern Railway zone of Indian Railways.

== History and developments ==
The foundation stone for the shed was laid on 25 December 1971 by the then Railway Minister, K. Hanumanthaiah. The shed opened for operations in 1975 with a total area of 169,000 square metres (170,000 m^{2}) and covered area of 19,600 square metres (20,000 m^{2}).

The shed initially homed 45 of the YDM-4 class metre-gauge locomotives. Three subsequent expansions were taken up which resulted in the holding capacity being increased to 100 metre gauge locomotives (1998), 40 broad-gauge locomotives (1993) and 100 broad gauge locomotives (2000).

== Infrastructure ==
The shed was started as a metre-gauge shed. However, with expansion over time, the bays and catwalks were converted from metre gauge to broad-gauge standards to home broad-gauge locomotives. Later, the shed went for a major expansion of its bays at a cost of ₹14 crore (US$1.5 million) to undertake maintenance activity for the unconventionally longer high-speed fuel efficient 4,500-horsepower (3,400 kW) EMD 710 locos (WDG-4, WDP-4B, WDP-4D and WDG-4D), which are homed since July 2011, thus becoming the first-of-its-kind shed in South India to maintain such high powered locos, which were extensively utilised for both passenger and freight services. The shed also houses a Diesel Traction and Training Centre (DTTC), opened on 7 April 1988, to impart theoretical and practical training for the newly recruited Assistant Loco Pilots, Engineers and other technical staffs. The centre only one of its kind in the zone also conducts periodical refresher courses for the in-service staffs of Indian Railways, and also too railway personnels from other countries. The DTTC along with Zonal Railway Training Institute (ZRTI), Trichy made a mark by imparting training to women, by which Narayana Vadivu and Jhansi Rani, became the first all women loco crew in the history of Southern Railway zone piloting a goods train on the Chord Line. With Indian Railways inching towards 100% Electrification Mission, two of its Old Metre Gauge bays have been converted into New Electrified Broad Gauge ones. Electric Loco trials in these bays with an Erode Shed (EDDX) WAP-4 locomotive, numbered 22273, were conducted successfully on 3 February 2022, with the commissioning of these E-locos expected anytime soon.

== Operations ==
The shed, headed by Senior Divisional Mechanical Engineer (Diesel), has about 750 employees in different ranks in the day-to-day operations of the shed, which include periodical overhaul, maintenance and repair works. The locos of this shed were thoroughly traverses over entire South India for passenger and freight services.

== Locomotive fleet ==
Serial No.	Locomotive Class	Horsepower	Quantity
1.	WDG-3A	3100	8
2.	WDM-3D	3300	15
3.	WDP-4B/4D	4500	48
4.	WDG-4/4D	4500	72
5.	YDM-4	1800	5
6.	WDS-6	1400	2
7.	WDM-7	2000	1
Total locomotives active as of October 2025			152

== Awards ==
The shed was adjudged the best shed among in the Southern Railway zone during 2012–2013. Also it won the "Performance Efficiency Shield" for the fifth time, since its inception in 2004–2005.
