= Indian locomotive class WDS-6 =

Indian Railway shunter class diesel locomotive

WDS-6
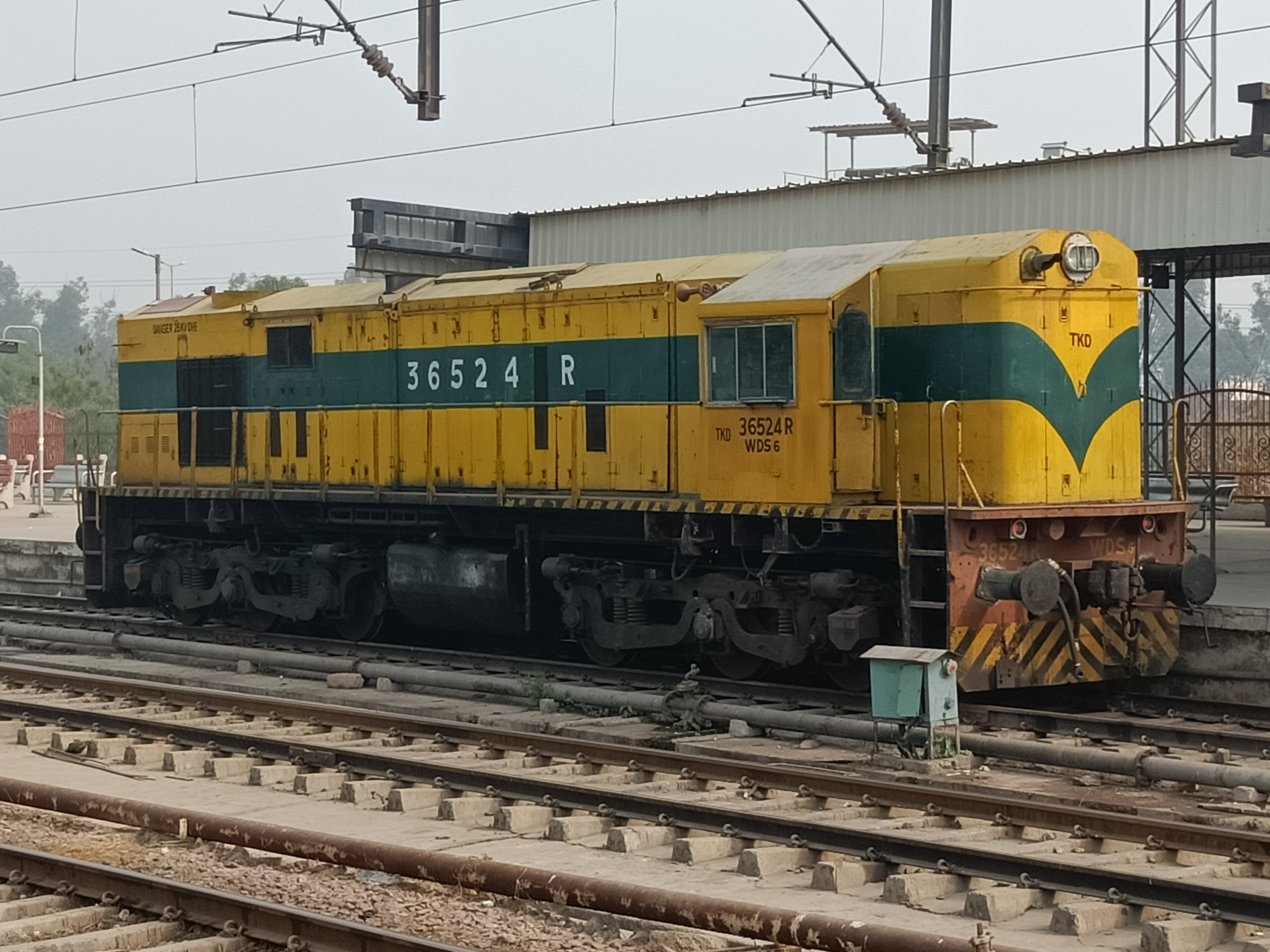
- A Tughlakabad-based WDS-6 at Anand Vihar Terminal
Type and origin
- Power type: Diesel
- Builder: BLW, Central Railway Loco Workshop, Parel
- Build date: 1975+
- Total produced: WDS-6: 300; WDS-6AD: 111
- Rebuilder: Parel Workshops
Specifications
- Configuration
  - UIC: Co′Co′
  - Commonwealth: Co-Co
- Gauge: 1,676 mm (5 ft 6 in)
- Bogies: ALCO Asymmetric cast frame trimount
- Wheel diameter: 1,092 mm (3 ft 7 in)
- Wheelbase: 12.834 m (42 ft 1 1/4 in)
- Length: 16.088 m (52 ft 9 3/8 in)
- Width: 2.864 m (9 ft 4 3/4 in)
- Height: 4.185 m (13 ft 8 3/4 in)
- Axle load: 21,000 kg (46,000 lb)
- Loco weight: 113,000 kg (249,000 lb)
- Fuel type: Diesel
- Fuel capacity: 3,000 L (660 imp gal; 790 US gal)
- Lubricant cap.: 530 L (120 imp gal; 140 US gal), 630 L (140 imp gal; 170 US gal) DLW
- Water cap.: 22 L (4.8 imp gal; 5.8 US gal), 28 L (6.2 imp gal; 7.4 US gal) DLW
- Prime mover: ALCO 251-D
- RPM range: 400-1100
- Engine type: Inline, 6-cylinder, diesel
- Aspiration: Turbo-supercharged
- Displacement: 267 mm (10.5 in)
- Generator: DC
- Traction motors: 6 DC
- Cylinders: 6
- Transmission: Diesel–electric transmission
- MU working: 2
- Loco brake: 28LV-1, Air brake for Locomotive using SA-9 brake handle
- Train brakes: Originally vacuum, or air, but some modified to dual
Performance figures
- Maximum speed: 71 km/h (44 mph)
- Power output: Max: 1,400 hp (1,000 kW); Site rated: 1,300 hp (970 kW)
- Tractive effort: 34.0 t (33 long tons; 37 short tons) maximum 16.050 t (16 long tons; 18 short tons) continuous
Career
- Operators: Indian Railways
- Locale: All over Indian Railways, some also leased and sold to some private- and public-sector industries
- Current owner: Indian Railways, Private industries
- Disposition: Active

The Indian locomotive class WDS-6 is a diesel–electric locomotive used by the Indian Railways mainly for shunting and also for performing departmental duties. The model name stands for broad gauge (W), Diesel (D), Shunting (S) engine, 6th generation (6). As of April 2022, 375 units of this class are currently in use all over India.

== History ==
This class was designed in 1975 as a powerful shunting locomotive able to haul 20- to 24-coach rakes that the earlier WDS-4 class were severely underpowered for. A WDS-6 locomotive consists of a YDM-4 powerpack (a 6-cylinder, 4-stroke, inline, turbo-supercharged ALCo engine) mounted on a WDM-2 body frame.

The class was initially manufactured solely by BLW, Varanasi, but later the Parel Workshop started building them using CKD (completely-knocked-down) kits provided by DLW. WDS-6 units can be easily recognized by their low short hoods (with two cab windows above these) and flat-ended cabs on the long-hood end. Many of them were sold and transferred to private industrial concerns and public sector undertakings (PSUs) in huge numbers, but still display their IR road numbers.

== Locomotive sheds ==
Total Locomotives active as of March 2025 : 270

== Liveries ==
Generally, these locomotives are seen with the typical yellow livery with green/red stripes.

== Technical specifications ==
The technical specifications of WDS-6 are as follows:

Manufacturers	DLW, Parel Workshop
Engine	Alco 251-D, Inline-6, 1,400 hp (1,000 kW) (1,300 hp or 970 kW site rating) with Alco turbocharged engine. 1,100 rpm max, 400 rpm idle; 228 mm × 267 mm (8.98 in × 10.51 in) bore x stroke; compression ratio 12.5:1.
Transmission	Electric, DC-DC (DC Generator and DC Traction motor)
Traction motors	GE for original Alco and MLW models, BHEL for DLW
Axle load	21 t (21 long tons; 23 short tons)
total weight	113 t (111 long tons; 125 short tons)
Bogies	Alco design cast frame trimount (Co-Co) bogies
Starting TE	34 t (33 long tons; 37 short tons), at adhesion 27%
Length over buffer beams	17,370 mm (56 ft 11 7/8 in)
Distance between bogies	10,516 mm (34 ft 6 in)

== Gallery ==
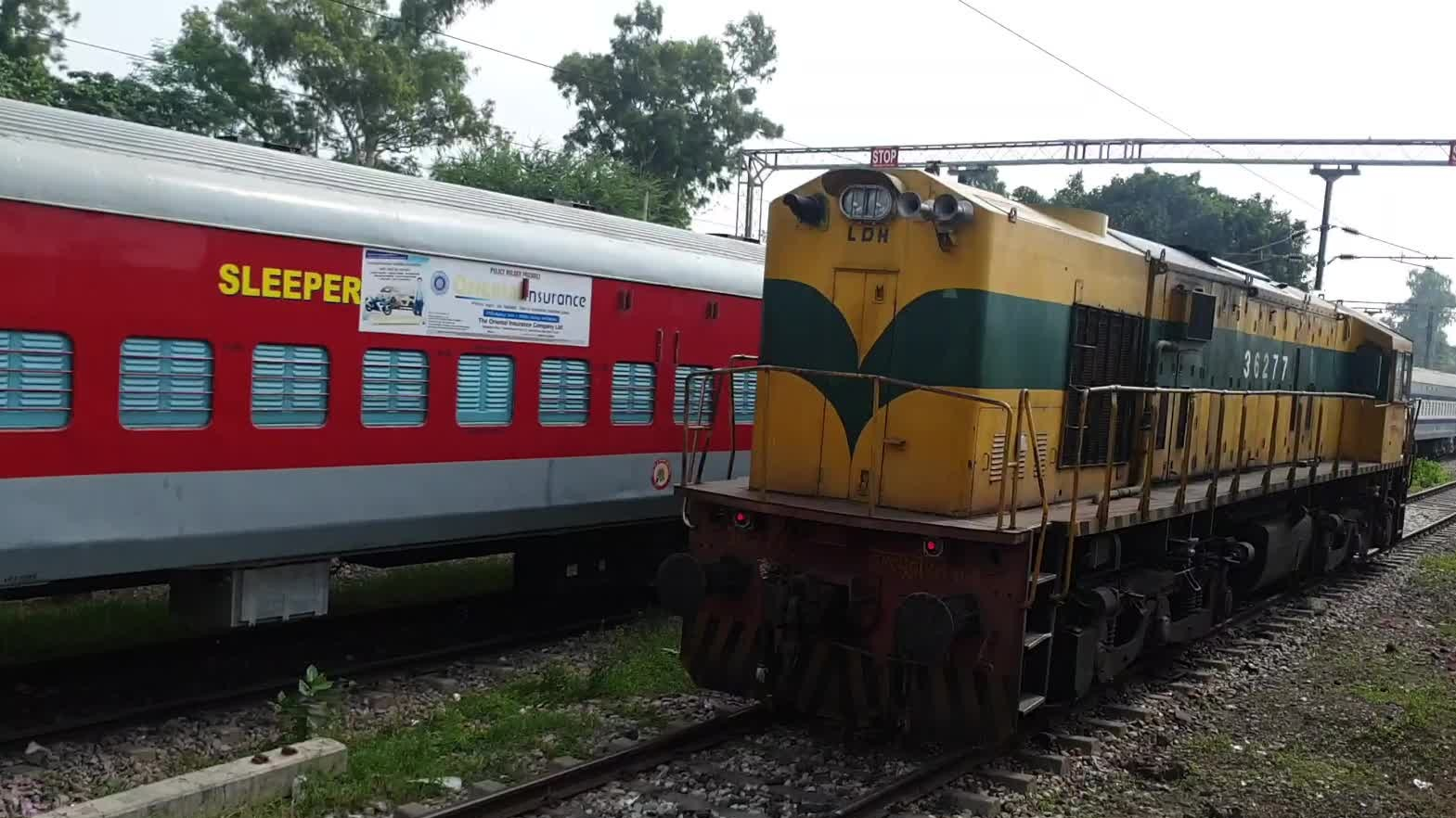
A WDS-6AD locomotive in the outer area of Saharanpur Junction

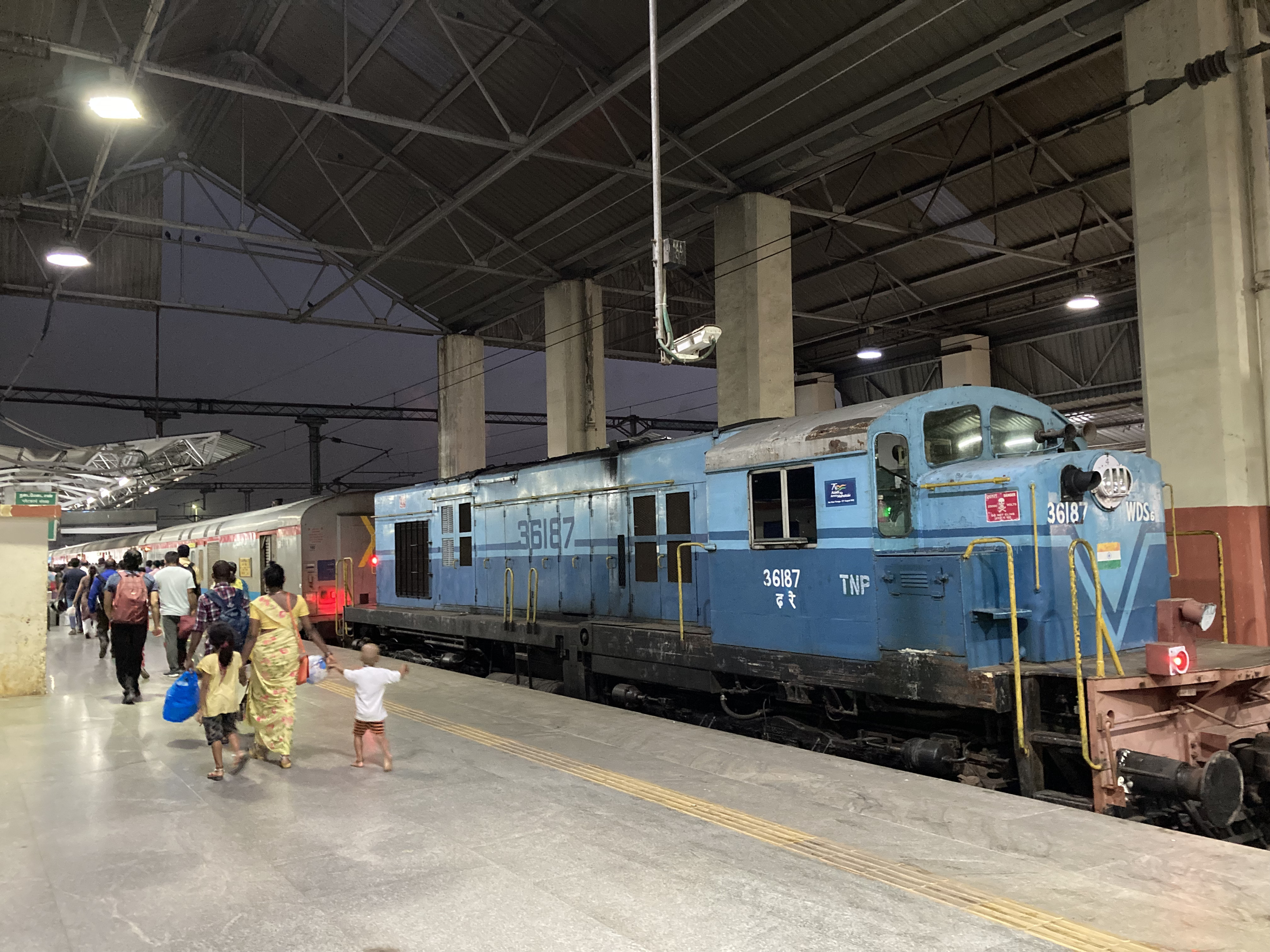
A Tondiarpet-based WDS6 locomotive at Chennai Central Station

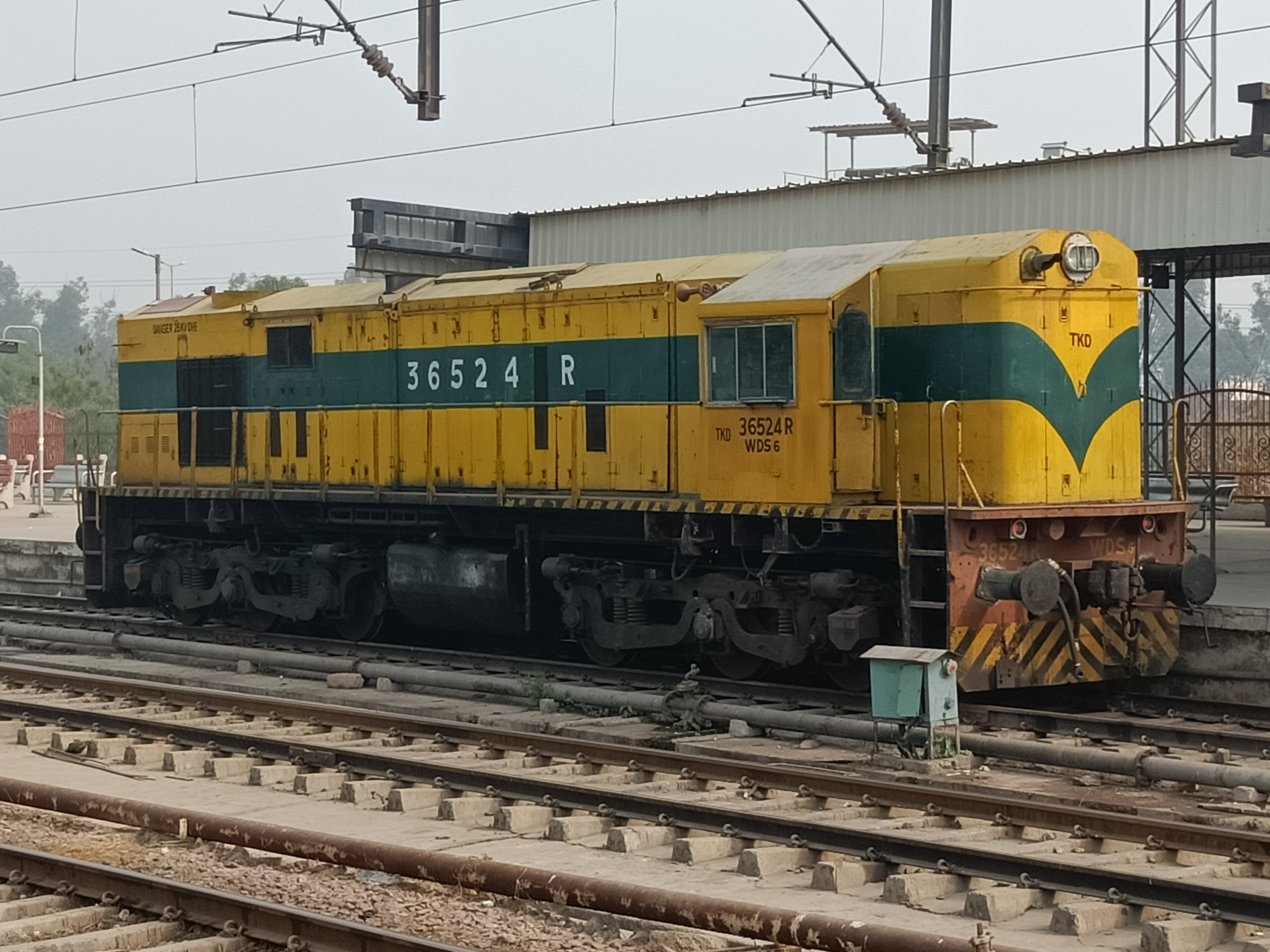
A Tughlakabad-based WDS-6 locomotive at Anand Vihar Terminal

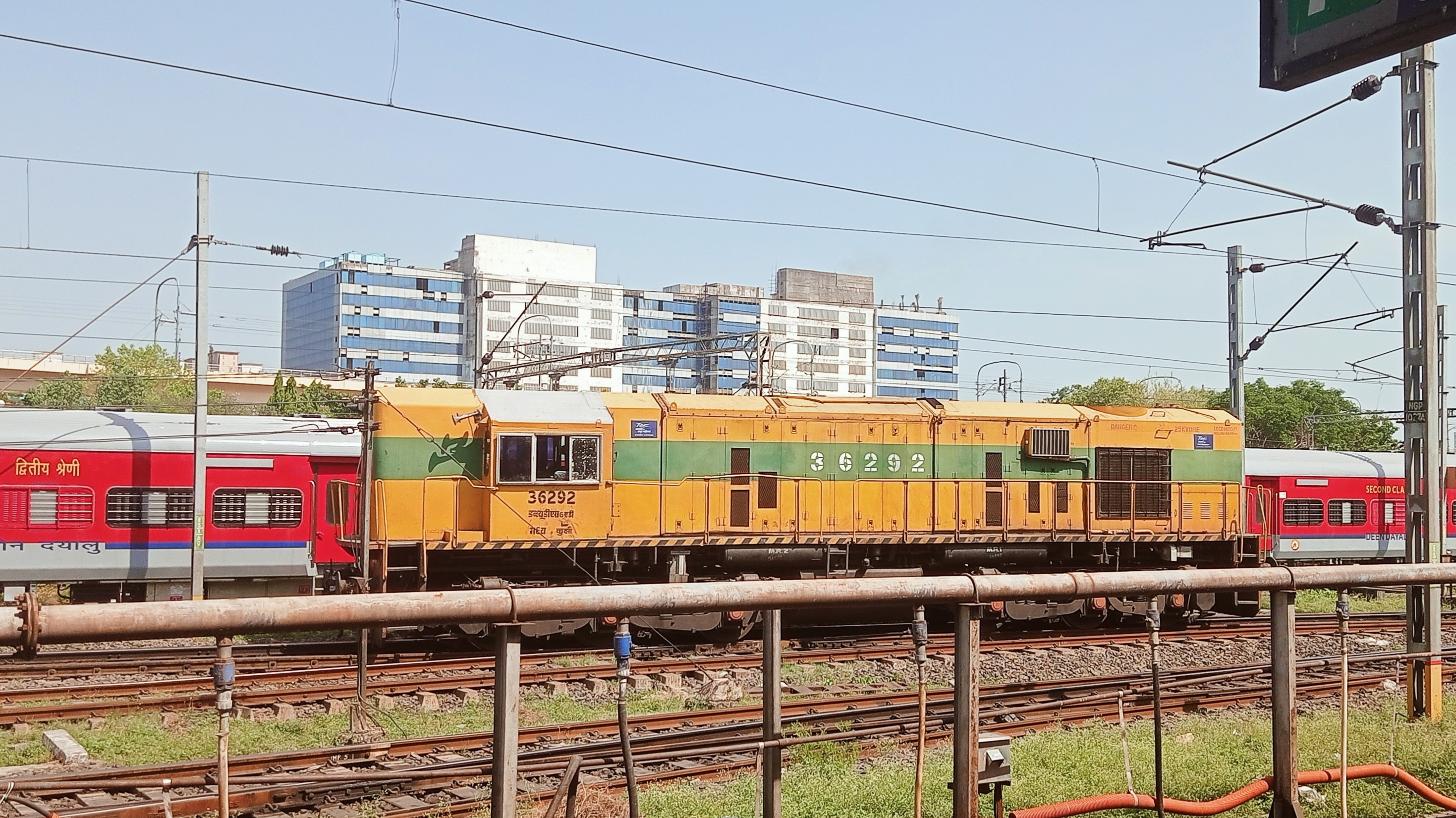
A Kurla-based WDS-6AD locomotive performing shunting duty at Nagpur Junction

== See also ==
- Rail transport in India § History
- Locomotives of India
- Rail transport in India
- Indian locomotive class YDM-4

=== Bibliography ===
- Hughes, Hugh (1996). Indian Locomotives: Part 4 – 1941–1990. Harrow, Middlesex: The Continental Railway Circle. ISBN 0-9521655-1-1. OCLC 35135033.
