= Electric Loco Shed, Asansol =

Loco shed in West Bengal, India

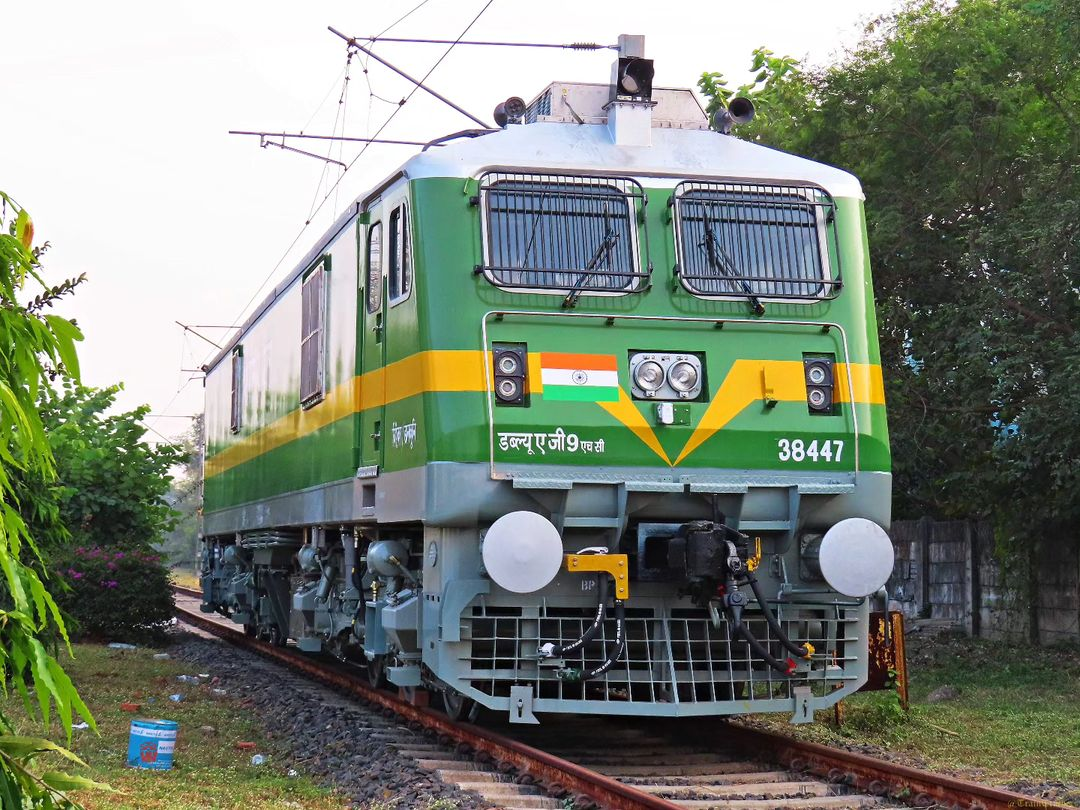
- A factory fresh WAG-9HC at Dankuni.

- Location within West Bengal

Location
- Location: Asansol, West Bengal
- Coordinates: 23.691972°N 86.969316°E

Characteristics
- Owner: Indian Railways
- Operator: Eastern Railway zone
- Depot code: ASN
- Type: Engine shed
- Roads: 6
- Rolling stock: WAG-9

History
- Opened: 1959; 67 years ago
- Former rolling stock: WAM-1, WAM-2/3, WAM-4, WAP-6, WAG-2, WAG-3, WAG-4, WAP-4, WAG-5, WAG-7

Electric Loco Shed, Asansol is a motive power depot performing locomotive maintenance and repair facility for electric locomotives of the Indian Railways, located at Asansol of the Eastern Railway zone in West Bengal, India. It is one of the two electric locomotive sheds of the Eastern Railway, the others being at Howrah (HWH). As of January, 2026, there are 315 locomotives in the shed.

== History ==
Steam locomotive sheds used to exist at Asansol (Howrah) until the late 1970s. After Eastern Railway set a deadline to eliminate all steam locomotive operations by 1990, a push was given towards establishing electric locomotion as the primary motive power, and the Steam locomotive sheds was decommissioned. To meet the needs of exponentially increasing rail traffic on the new continuous broad-gauge lines from Kolkata to rest of India with the completion of gauge conversion, the Asansol was selected by Indian railways for a new electric locomotive shed.

Asansol shed was started in May 1959 by converting a small portion of steam shed with a holding of 45 locos. The imported WAM-1 locomotives were based in this shed after commissioning. With the addition of WAM-2/3 locos. imported from Japan, the need for the expansion of this shed was felt and it was expanded to home 80 locos. In the year 1969 by taking some more portion of the steam shed 12 imported mixed locos. from Japan (10 WAM-2 + 2 WAM-3) and 45 WAG-2 locos. were added. To give marginal relief to the congestion, the 45 WAG-2s were transferred to MGS shed.

With the introduction of EMU rakes from BHEL and ICF in Calcutta suburban section, 25 WAM-2 locos, which were working in push-pull operation, were converted to main line operation. The original WAM-1/2 locos, having ignitrons for AC-to-DC conversion, were converted to silicon rectifier system in the years 1968 to 1970. CLW started production and the first batch of 10 WAG-4 locos were commissioned and based at Asansol shed in 1970. In 1971, CLW started manufacturing WAM-4s which were commissioned at Asansol. Shed was further expanded in 1974 to home 110 locos. which increased to 115 in 1980. With the introduction of air-brake stock, some WAG-4s were converted for dual brake operation. Further facilities were created for maintaining 20 such locos.

In the late 1995s WAP-6 were introduced which stayed until late 2005, when they were transferred to Howrah. It later got a large fleet of WAP-4 locos from howrah. All WAP-6 locos from Howrah shed converted to WAP-4 units and transferred here. The shed also have a few WAM-4 units. All the WAM-4s of this shed are being used for shunting service.

== Operations ==
Being one of the three electric engine sheds in Eastern Railway, various major and minor maintenance schedules of electric locomotives are carried out here. It has the sanctioned capacity of 175 engine units. Beyond the operating capacity, this shed houses a total of 207 engine units, including 90 WAP-4 and 19 WAP-7. It also housed a few WAM-4 locomotives temporarily. Electric loco Shed, Asansol is now housing a large fleet of WAP-4 in Indian Railways and it caters to many long-distance electric trains.

Like all locomotive sheds, ASN does regular maintenance, overhaul and repair including painting and washing of locomotives. It not only attends to locomotives housed at ASN but to ones coming in from other sheds as well. It has four pit lines for loco repair. Locomotives of Asansol ELS along with Howrah ELS were the regular links for all trains running through West Bengal when widespread electrification of railway lines started in Eastern Railways. ASN locomotives used to be predominantly the regular links for trains traveling to north as well.

== Locomotives ==
Serial No.	Locomotive Class	Horsepower	Quantity
1.	WAG-9	6120	318
Total Locomotives Active as of February 2026			318
