= Indian locomotive class WAM-4 =

Indian Railway class mix (passenger & freight) electric locomotive

WAM-4
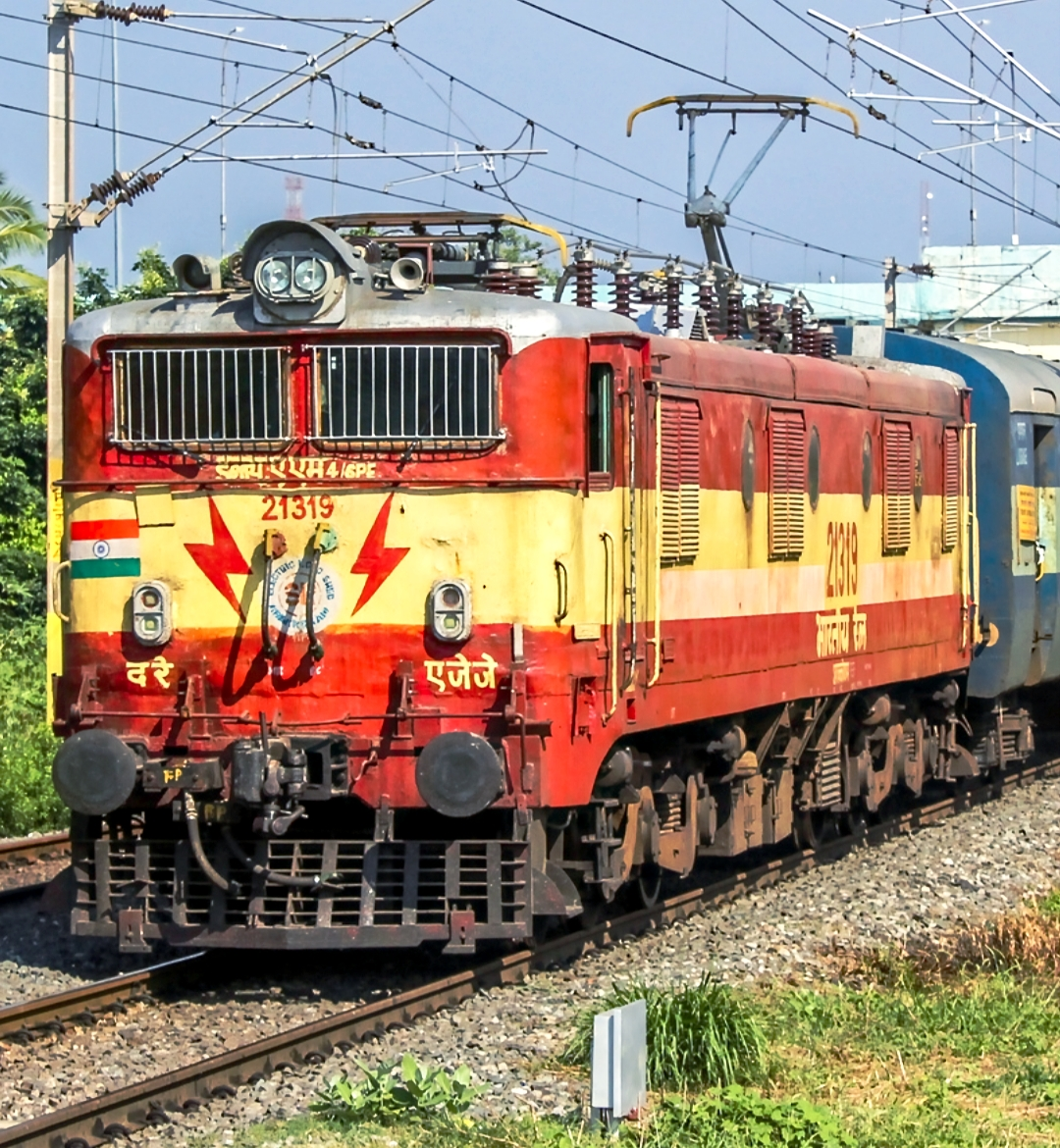
- Arakkonam based WAM-4 (now scrapped) with Chennai-Tirupati Express.
Type and origin
- Power type: Electric
- Designer: RDSO
- Builder: CLW
- Build date: 1970–1983
- Total produced: WAM-4: 500; WAG-5: 53
- Rebuilder: CLW
- Rebuild date: 1978–1983 to WAG-5
- Number rebuilt: 53
Specifications
- Configuration
  - AAR: C-C
  - UIC: Co′Co′
  - Commonwealth: Co-Co
- Gauge: 5 ft 6 in (1,676 mm)
- Bogies: ALCO Asymmetric cast frame trimount
- Wheel diameter: New: 1,092 mm (3 ft 7 in); Half worn: 1,055 mm (3 ft 5 1/2 in); Full worn: 1,016 mm (3 ft 4 in)
- Wheelbase: 2,108 mm (6 ft 11 in)
- Length
  - Over couplers: 19,975 mm (65 ft 6 in)
  - Over body: 18,680 mm (61 ft 3 in)
- Width: 3,055 mm (10 ft 0 in)
- Height: 4,162 mm (13 ft 8 in)
- Frame type: Asymmetric cast frame
- Axle load: 18.8 tonnes (18.5 long tons; 20.7 short tons)
- Loco weight: 112.8 tonnes (111.0 long tons; 124.3 short tons)
- Sandbox cap.: 16 units X 30 t (30 long tons; 33 short tons)
- Power supply: 110 V DC Supply
- Electric system/s: 25 kV 50 Hz AC Overhead
- Current pickup: Pantograph
- Traction motors: Alstom TAO 659A1
  - Rating 1 hour: 770 HP. 750 V, 840 A, 1095 RPM
  - Continuous: 798 HP. 750 V, 870 A, 1070 RPM
- Head end power: 110 V DC Supply
- Transmission: Electrical
- Gear ratio: 15:62
- MU working: 4 units
- Loco brake: Air, Rheostatic braking
- Train brakes: Air, Vacuum and Dual
- Safety systems: Slip control, Over voltage relay, No volt relay, Earth fault relay, Low pressure governor, Train parting alarms, and Brake cylinder cutoff valve
Performance figures
- Maximum speed: 120 km/h (75 mph)
- Power output: 3,640 hp (2,710 kW)
- Tractive effort
  - Starting: 33,840 kgf (331.9 kN; 74,600 lbf)
  - 1 hour: 30,000 kgf (290 kN; 66,000 lbf)
  - Continuous: 17,600 kgf (173 kN; 39,000 lbf)
Career
- Operators: Indian Railways
- Class: WAM-4
- Numbers: WAM-4B: 20400–20699, 21200–21399; WAG-5: 21100-21138
- Nicknames: Garuda, Ananth, RAJATABHA, Surubhi, Navchetna, Sukh Sagar, Naveen
- Locale: All over India
- Delivered: 4 December 1970
- First run: March 1971; 55 years ago
- Withdrawn: May 2023; 3 years ago
- Preserved: 6 units
- Disposition: Condemned

The Indian locomotive class WAM-4 was a class of 25 kV AC electric locomotives that was developed in 1970 by Chittaranjan Locomotive Works (CLW) for Indian Railways. The model name stands for broad gauge (W), alternating current (A), mixed traffic (M) locomotive, 4th generation (4). They entered service in March 1971. A total of 500 WAM-4 were built at CLW between 1970 and 1983, which made them the most numerous class of mainline electric locomotive till its successor the WAG-5.

The WAM-4 was considered as one of the most successful locomotives of Indian Railways having served both passenger and freight trains for over 52 years. This class provided the basic design for a number of other locomotives like WCAM-1, WAG-5A, WCG-2, and some WAP-1 models. However, with the advent of new 3-phase locomotives like WAP-5 and WAP-7, the WAM-4 locomotives were relegated to hauling smaller passenger trains. As of June 2023, this loco has been condemned.

== History ==
=== Origins ===
In the 1970s, the Indian Railways started a series of study projects for a high horsepower locomotive. Although the WAG-1/WAG-4 was being introduced, officials believed that a much larger and more capable locomotive was needed, especially to haul Freight trains that was heavy for any existing locomotives. These studies led to initial requirements for a locomotive with a tractive effort of 33,840 kgf (331.9 kN; 74,600 lbf) and a speed of 120 km/h (75 mph).The WAM-4 was conceived while goods traffic was increasing in the 1970s. The era of Co-Co locomotives, led by the enormous popularity of the WDM-2, had revolutionized long-distance travel. With the aim of addressing the shortcomings of the previous WAM-1/2 and WAG-1, WAG-2, WAG-3, WAG-4 classes and remove steam s from IR by a target date of 1990. The WAM-1s were not great successes as some of their advanced features were unsuitable for Indian conditions. Therefore, the designers at RDSO and CLW decided to use the following

- Instead of the Bo-Bo bogies of WAM-1/2, ALCO asymmetric Trimount bogies of the WDM-2 were provided for better traction and power.
- Silicon rectifiers with speed control by three series-parallel motor combinations and weak field operation.
- Auxiliaries from Westinghouse and Kirloskar (compressors), S F India (blowers) and Northey (exhauster)
- Air brakes for loco and vacuum train brakes fitted as original equipment with Rheostatic braking also provided
- MU operation made possible up to 4 units possible.

=== Production ===
Production of these locomotives started in 1970 with #20400 and exactly 500 WAM-4s were built in 13 years with #21399 “Anant” being the last one. Production ended on August 3 1983. WAM-4 though an indigenously produced loco was heavily inspired by French box design and naturally favoured a French TM which was the Alstom made TAO TM. A single WAM-4 can generally haul up to a 24-coach passenger rake. This class proved very successful by virtue of its ruggedness and simplicity of maintenance, making it extremely suitable for Indian conditions.

=== Rebuilding ===
A number of locomotives were rebuilt as WAM-4B in the late 1970s to evaluate Alstom TAO 659 Traction Motors and for exclusive use on freight duties. These 'locos' were ballasted to improve traction and had excellent load-hauling capabilities, This experiment gave rise to the future WAG-5 locos.

=== Duties ===
The class was designed for both passenger and freight work. Many of the original locomotives were fitted with vacuum brakes only. With the withdrawal of many WAG-1 and WAM-1 locomotives in the 1990s, the WAM-4 units were given air brakes to prolong their life into the 1990s and beyond.

=== Sub-classes ===
This loco class has been seen in many variations, as a lot of workshops and sheds have carried out their own enhancements or modifications to the basic loco design. Although the code indicates a mixed-use loco, most WAM-4's ended up hauling passenger trains.

Variants include

- WAM4B or G: Freight only (re geared version)
- WAM4D or DB: Dual Braked (Air and Vacuum)
- WAM4E: Air Brake only (for both loco and train)
- WAM4H: Hitachi Traction Motors instead of Alstom
- WAM4P: Passenger only (re geared version)
- WAM4/2S3P: 2 Traction Motors in Series, 3 in Parallel
- WAM4/6P: 6 traction motors permanently in parallel
- WAM4/6PE: Air braked, 6 Traction Motors perm. in parallel
- WAM4/6PDBHS: 6 Traction Motors permanently in parallel, Dual Brakes, High Speed
- WAM-4P D: Passenger only (dual brakes)
- WAM-4P DB 6P and WAM-4 6P D: These are for superfast trains
- WAM-4P DB 3P and WAM-4 2S-3P: some superfasts, passengers
- WAS-4: Shunting only

The 'DB' or 'D' generally, but perhaps not always, indicates dual-brake capability. 'HS' may be for 'high speed'.'2S', '3P', '6P', etc. indicate traction motors connected in series or parallel. The WAM-4 has six traction motors, and originally they were wired to be available in different configurations at different power settings. At notches up to 14, all motors were in series (at notch 14 all resistors dropping out); up to notch 21 in series-parallel combinations (three pairs of motors in series, the pairs themselves being in parallel); and further notches with all motors in parallel (at notch 30 all motors are in parallel with resistors dropping out). This is the original configuration of the WCAM-1 series of locomotives too.

The WAM-4 locomotives were later reconfigured to have all motors always in parallel (6P variants) or with the three series-connected pairs in parallel (2S 3P variants). Some WAM-4 locomotives from CLW are thought to have had the 2S 3P configuration right from the start. The 2S 3P configuration was better for the mixed traffic loads especially as it allowed the locomotives to start hauling larger loads without stalling. With increasing use of the WAM-4 locomotives for passenger traffic the all-parallel configuration was deemed more desirable since it allowed higher speeds and higher acceleration.

== Livery ==
This loco has a wide variety of liveries, with each loco shed having its own livery.

Most of the WAM-4 locomotives now have their MU capability disabled as RDSO disapproves of these locomotives running MU'd over 100 km/h.

== Named locomotives ==
A few WAM-4 locomotives have been named by Indian Railways

List of Named locomotives
Class	Loco Number	Name	Loco Shed	Current status	ref
WAM-4	20401	Rajatabha	Bhillai [BIA]	Condemned [07/08/2007]	
WAM-4	20420	Sukh Sagar Naveen	Vijayawada [BZA]	Scrapped	
WAM-4	20615	Surubhi	Asansol [ASN]	Condemned in November 2011	
WAM-4	21320	Garuda	Arakkonam [AJJ]	Plinthed at Rail Soudha, SWR HQ, Hubli [January 2020]	
WAM-4	21380	Navchetna	Asansol [ASN]	Scrapped	
WAM-4	21399	Anant	Bhusawal [BSL]	Scrapped	

== Preserved examples ==
As increasing numbers of WAM-4 have been retired, some have found their way into museums or other uses. A few WAM-4 locomotives have been preserved by Indian Railways at various location around India.

Class	Loco Number	Previous shed	Name	Livery	Location	ref
WAM-4	20400	BIA		BIA cream/orange with blue stripe	Used at Electric Loco Training Center, Uslapur [October 2011]. Reumbered ELTC-120	
WAM-4	20472	Ghaziabad (GZB)			Restricted to shunting/departmental duties only. Earmarked for preservation: I.R. Heritage Website [November 2018]	
WAM-4	20484	Bhusawal (BSL)		BSL cream/orange with orange lining	Loco now preserved at CLW loco park	
WAM-4	20601	Jhansi (JHS)		Maroon with cream band	Earmarked for preservation: I.R. Heritage Website [November 2018]	
WAM-4	21320	Arakkonam (AJJ)	Garuda	Red/dark grey/light grey with white line	Plinthed at Rail Soudha, SWR HQ, Hubli [January 2020]	
WAG-5/WAM-4B	21101	Tatanagar (TATA)		Indian Tricolour Livery	Plinthed outside TATA	

=== Former sheds ===
- Tatanagar
- Bhilai
- Asansol
- Kanpur
- Ludhiana
- Vadodara
- Visakhapatnam
- Itarsi
- Arakkonam
- Mughalsarai
- Lallaguda
- Vijayawada
- Bhusawal
- Valsad
- Howrah
- Jhansi
- Tughlakabad
- Sealdah
- Ghaziabad

== Technical specifications ==
Traction Motors	Alstom TAO 659 A1 (575 kW, 750 V). Six motors, axle-hung, nose-suspended, force-ventilated.
Gear Ratio	15:62 originally (and still for WAM-4 2S3P), now many variations, 21:58 being common for WAM-4 6P locomotives.
Transformer	Heil BOT 3460 A, 22.5 kV / 3460 kVA.
Rectifiers	Two silicon rectifier cells, 1270 V / 1000 A each cubicle.
Pantographs	Two Faiveley AM-12.
Hauling capacity	2,010 t (1,980 long tons; 2,220 short tons)
Current Ratings	(WAM-4 6P) 1100A/10min, 750A continuous

== Image gallery ==
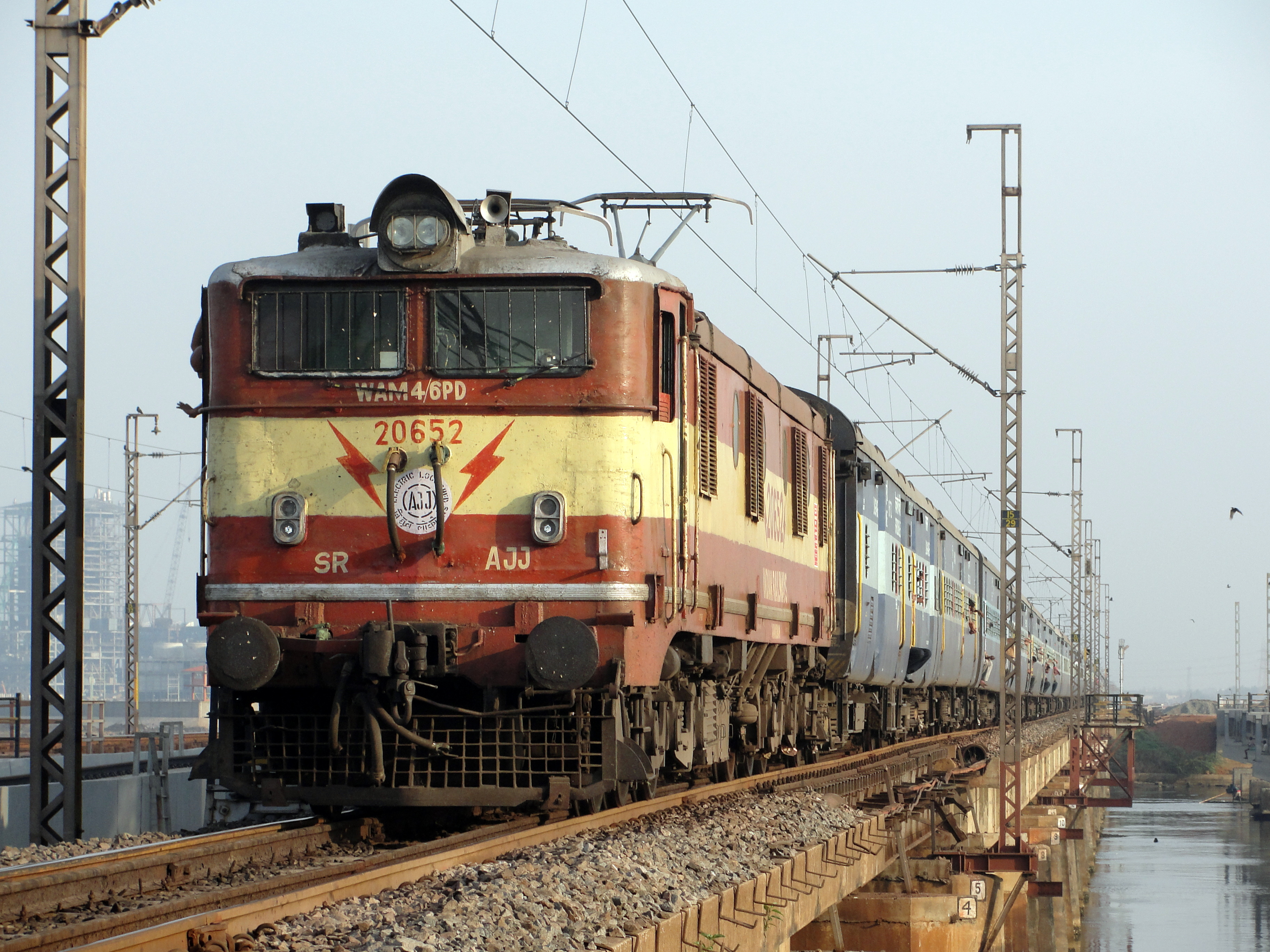
AJJ based WAM-4 with an express train

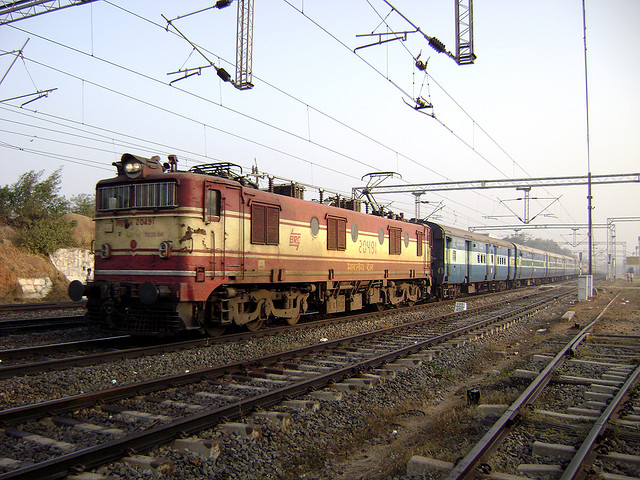
WAM 4 series loco 20491 from Vadodara Shed VSKP-Nanded Express

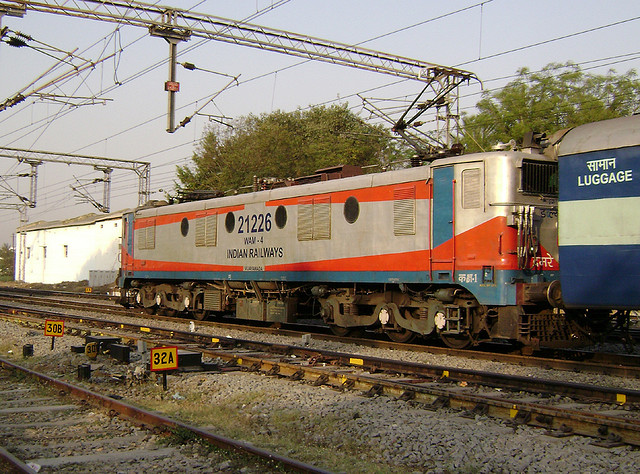
WAM 4 series loco 21226 from Visakhapatnam Shed spotted at Moula Ali

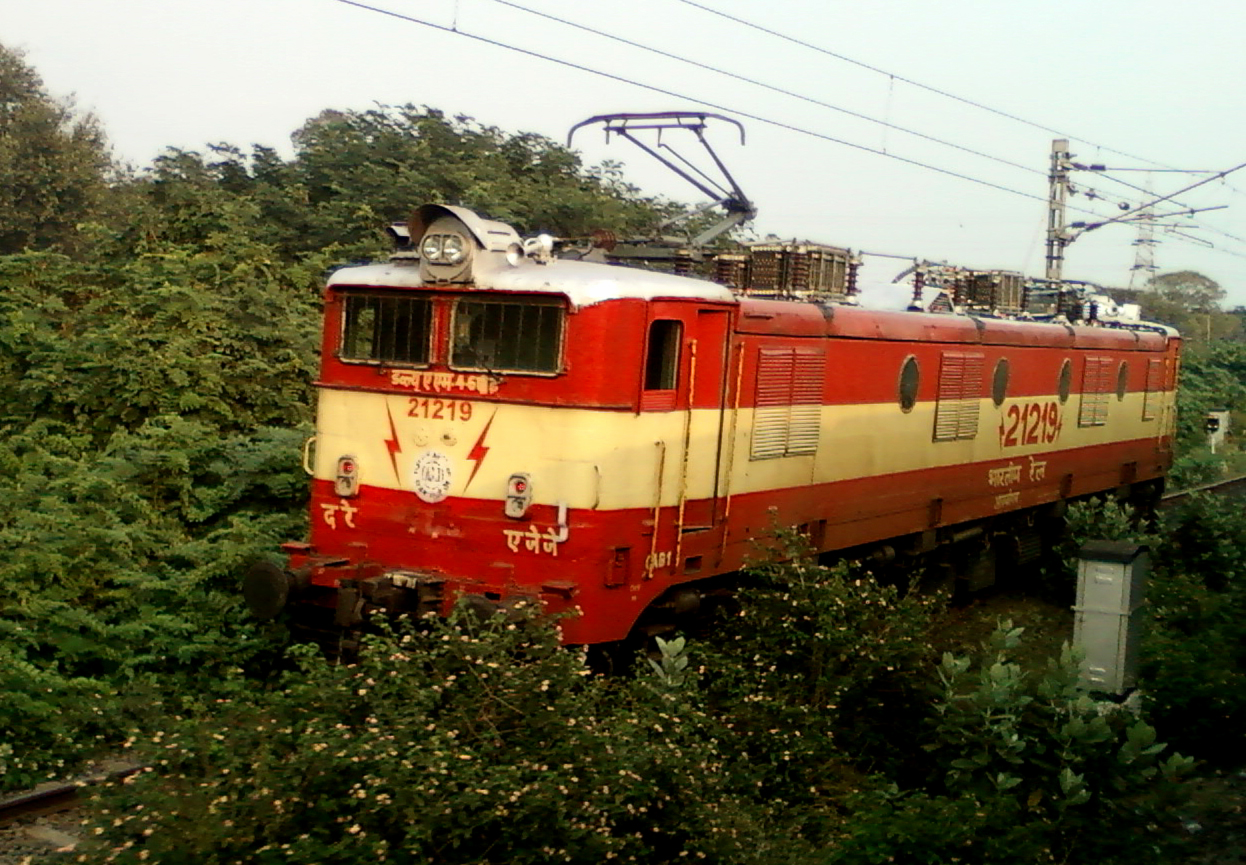
WAM 4 series loco 21219 from Arakkonam Shed spotted at Visakhapatnam Junction

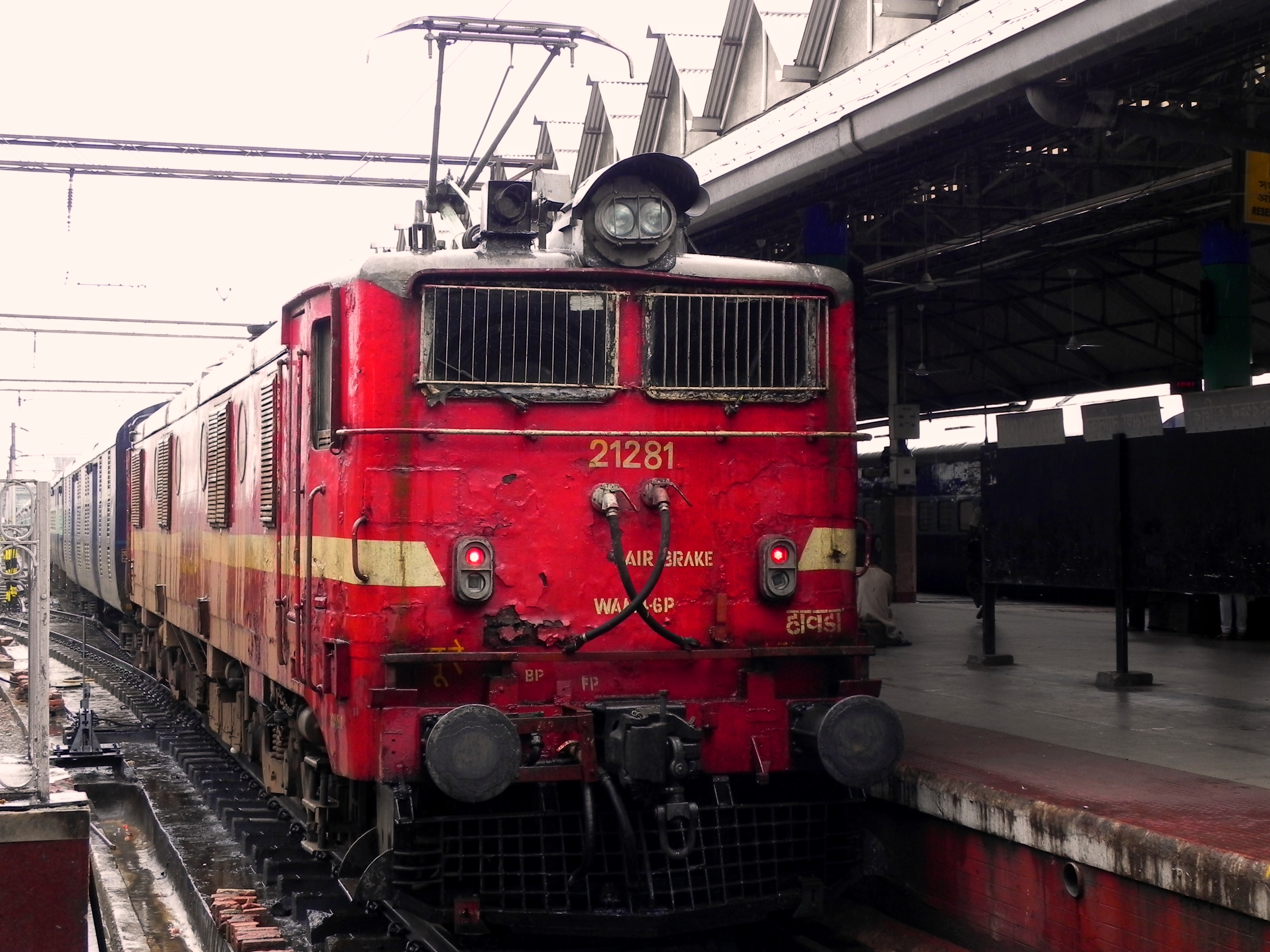
13022 (Raxaul - Howrah) Mithila Express with HWH WAM 4 21281 based at katni shed

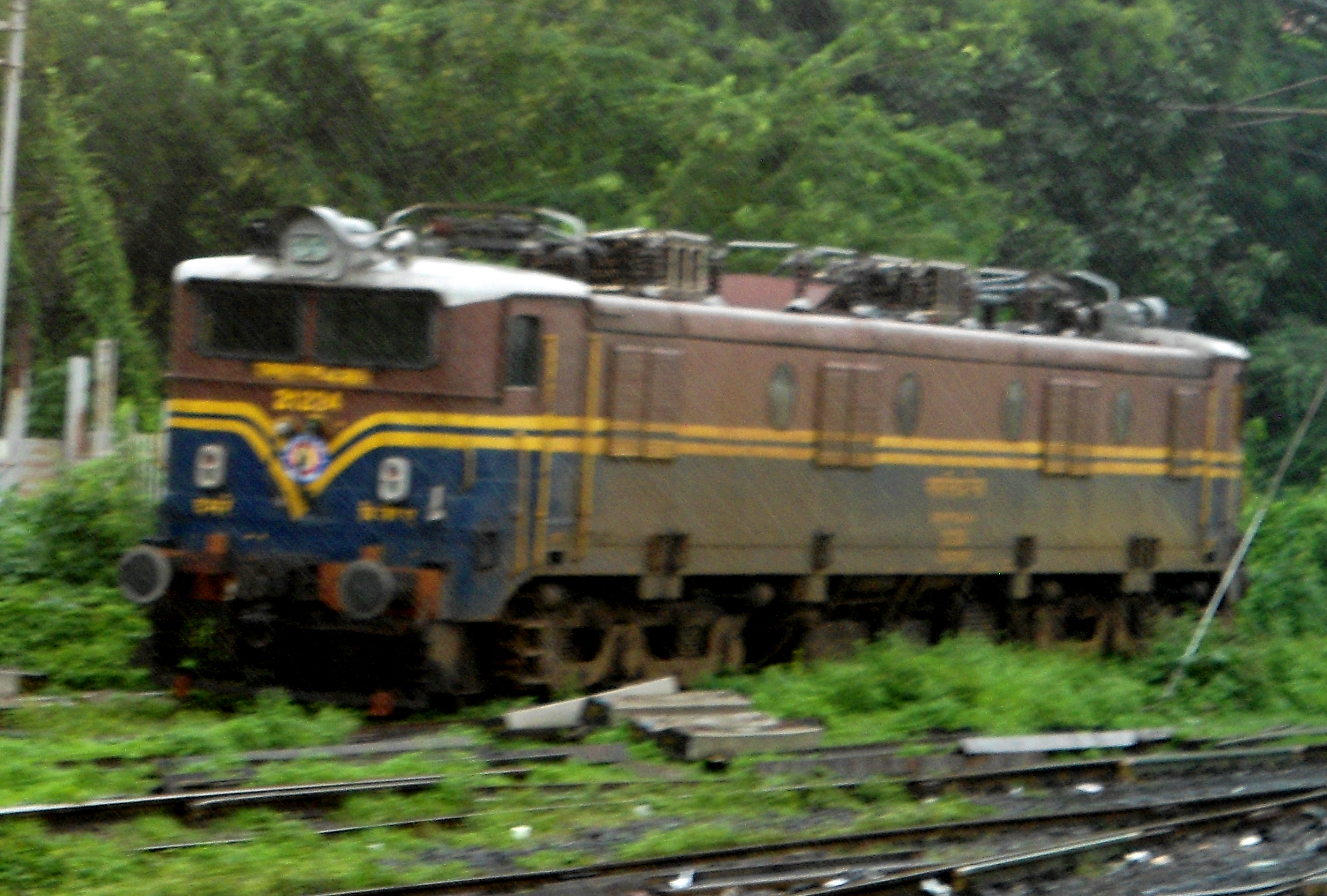
WAM-4P loco of Vijayawada Shed spotted at Secunderabad

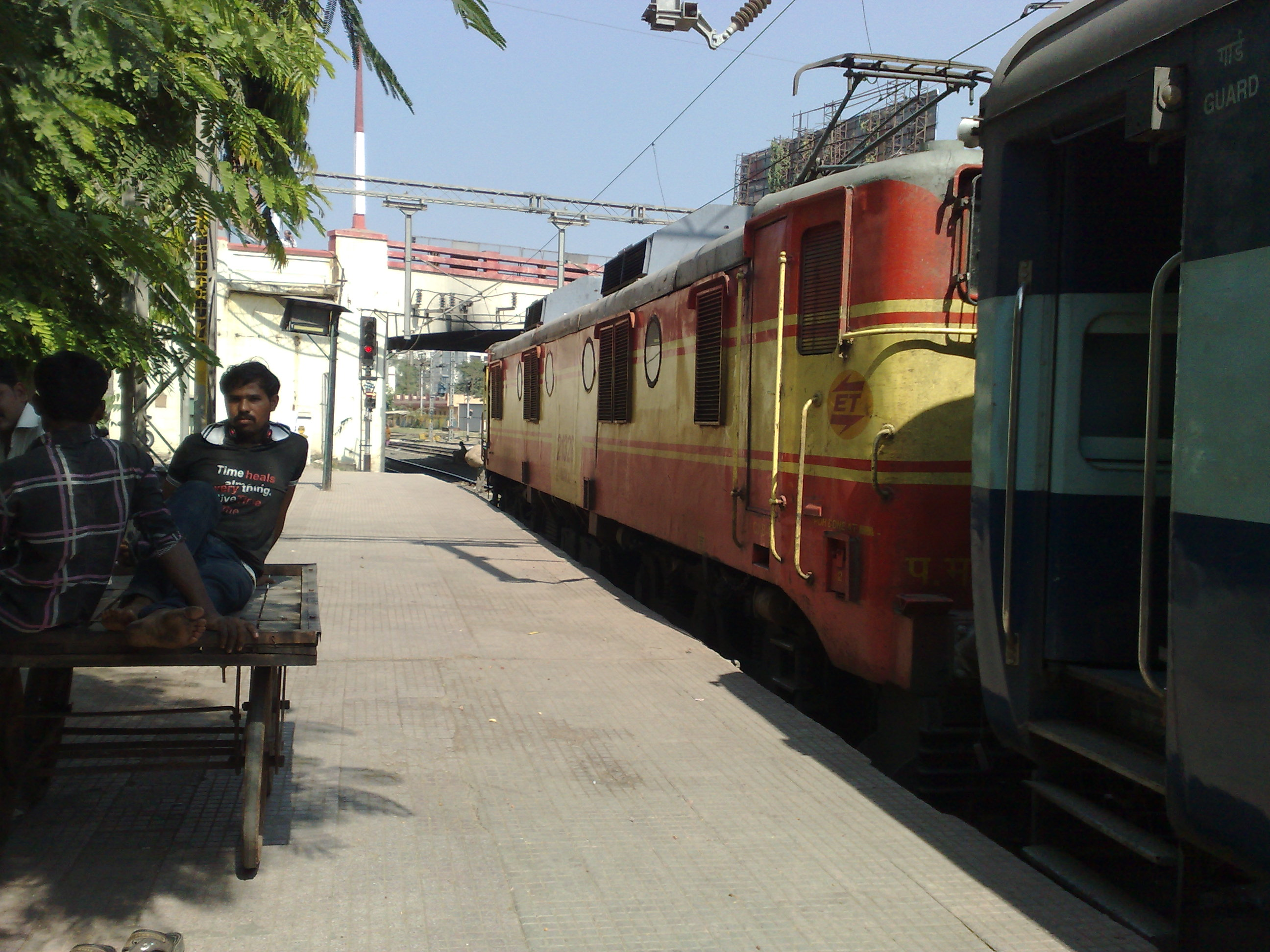
WAM 4 with the Malwa Express

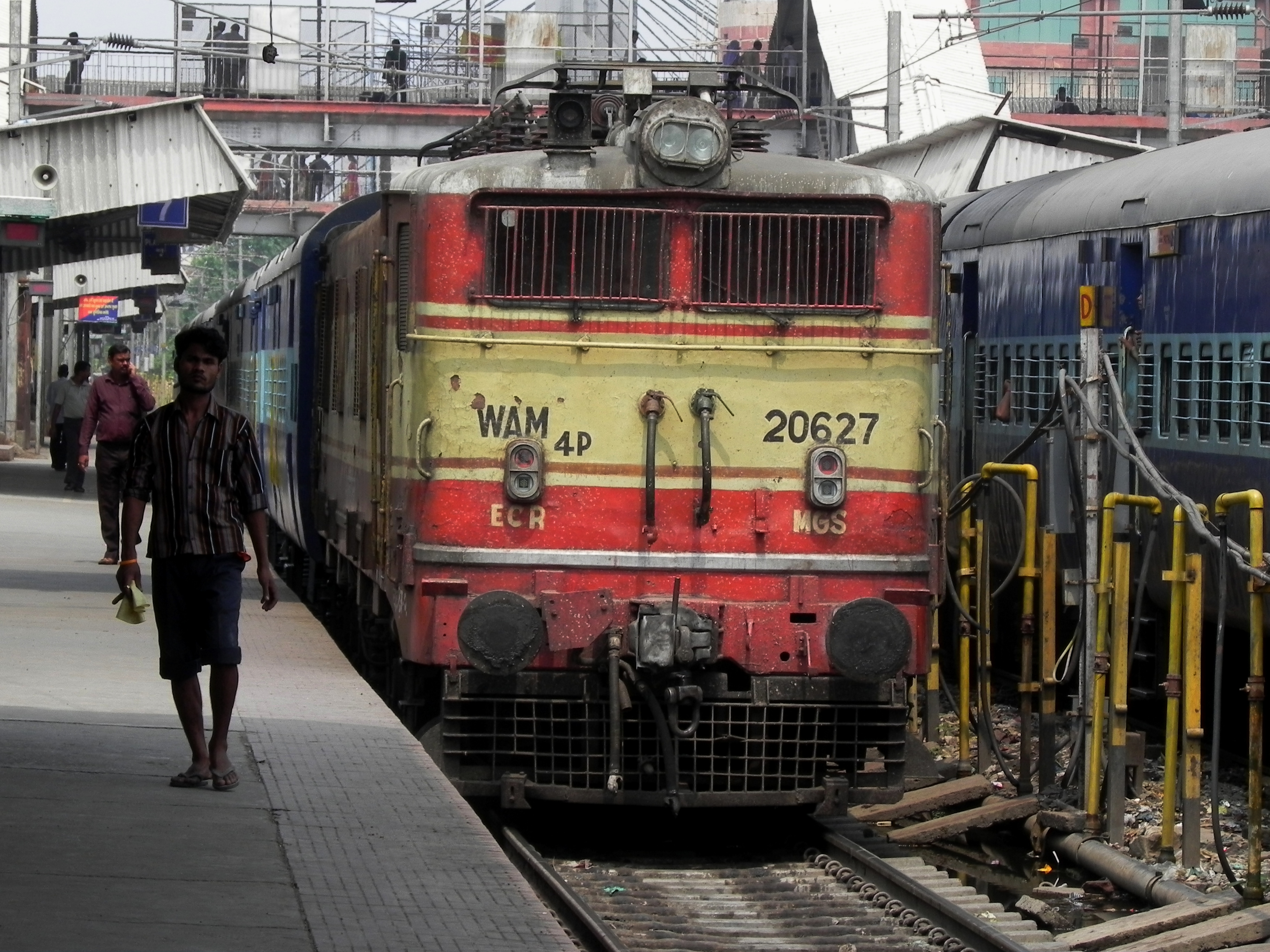
12295 (SBC-PNBE) Sanghamitra Express from Mughalsarai Shed

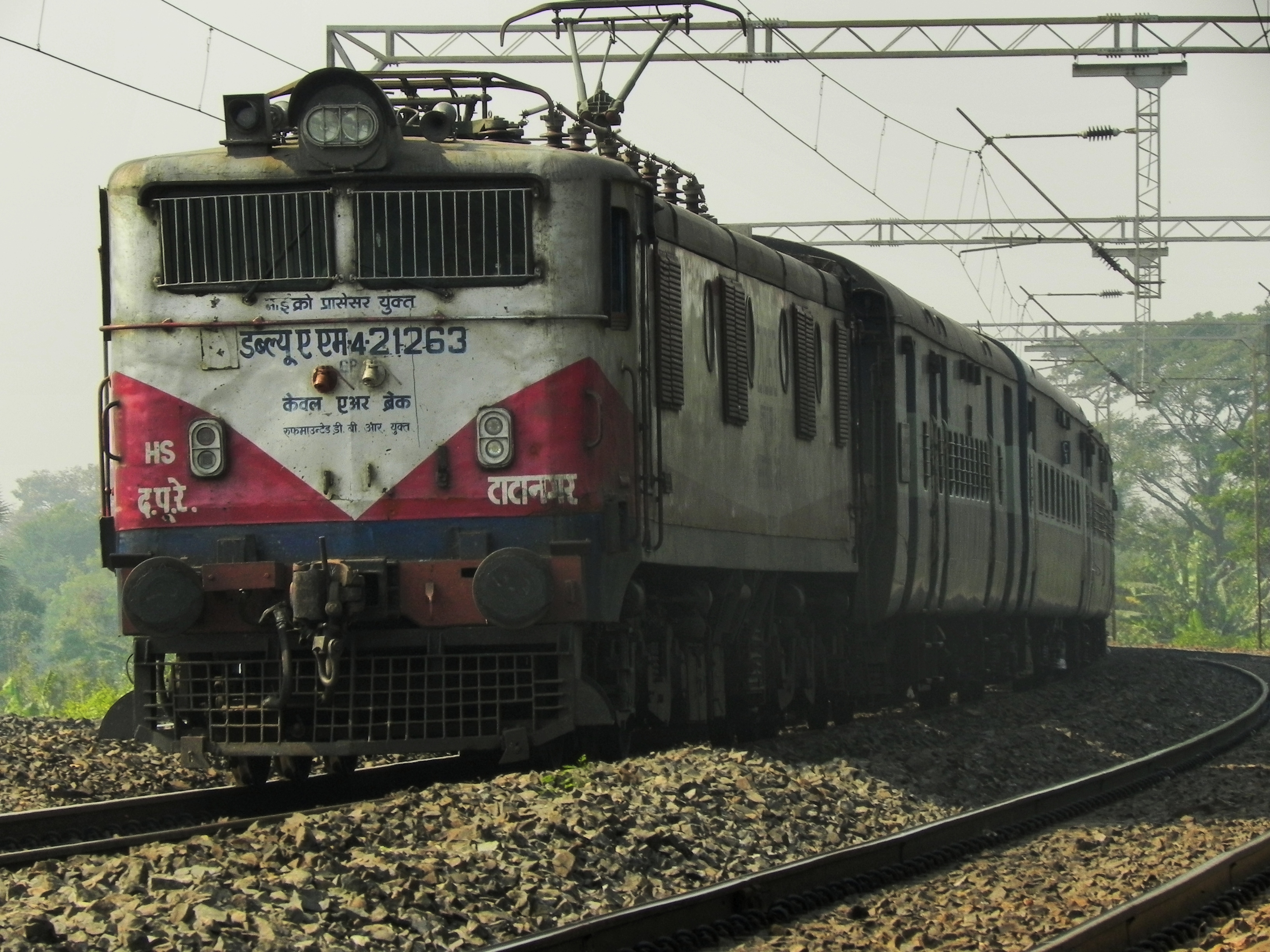
Howrah bound 12814 (Tatanagar-Howrah) Steel Express with WAM4 series loco of Tata shed

== WAS-4 ==
Numbers 21380, 21385 and 21387 of WAM-4 6P were relegated to shunting duty and designated WAS-4.

== See also ==
- Indian Railways
- Locomotives of India
- Rail transport in India
