= Kolkata–Anand Vihar Express =

Kolkata Anand Vihar Express
Overview
- Service type: Express
- First service: 01 July 2014
- Last service: 02 October 2016
- Current operator: Northern Railways

Route
- Termini: Kolkata Chitpur; Anand Vihar Terminal
- Stops: 89
- Distance travelled: 1,520 km (944 mi)
- Average journey time: 39 hours 50 mins as 13131 Kolkata–Anand Vihar Express, 40 hours as 13132 Anand Vihar–Kolkata Express.
- Service frequency: Daily
- Train number: 13131 / 32

On-board services
- Classes: AC 3 tier, Sleeper class, Second Sitting Unreserved
- Seating arrangements: Yes
- Sleeping arrangements: Yes
- Catering facilities: No

Technical
- Rolling stock: Standard Indian Railways coaches
- Track gauge: 1,676 mm (5 ft 6 in)
- Electrification: Yes
- Operating speed: 38.38 km/h (24 mph) including halts.

The 13131 / 32 Kolkata–Anand Vihar Express is an Express train belonged to Indian Railways – Northern Railway zone that had run between Kolkata Chitpur and Anand Vihar Terminal in India. Kolkata Anand Vihar Express was later changed into Kolkata Patna Express in 2016.

It operated as train number 13131 from Kolkata Station (Chitpur) to Anand Vihar Terminal and as train number 13132 in the reverse direction, serving the states of West Bengal, Jharkhand, Bihar, Uttar Pradesh & Delhi.

== Coaches ==
The 13131 / 32 Kolkata–Anand Vihar Express has 1 AC 3 tier, 4 Sleeper class, 2 General Unreserved, 1 High Capacity Parcel coach, 1 Full Postal Van and 2 SLR (Seating cum Luggage Rake) coaches. It does not carry a pantry car.

In addition 1 AC 3 tier and 1 Sleeper class coach are attached / detached at Madhupur Junction bound for Giridih .

As is customary with most train services in India, coach composition may be amended at the discretion of Indian Railways depending on demand.

== Service ==
The 13131 Kolkata–Anand Vihar Express covers the distance of 1,520 km (944 mi) in 39 hours 50 mins (38.46 km/h) and in 40 hours as 13132 Anand Vihar–Kolkata Express (38.30 km/h)

== Routeing ==
The 13131 / 32 Kolkata–Anand Vihar Express runed from Kolkata Chitpur via Patna, Mughalsarai, Allahabad, Kanpur Central to Anand Vihar Terminal.

As the route is fully electrified, a Howrah-based WAP-4 or Asansol-based WAM-4 are the traditional power for this train and haul the train for its entire journey.

== Operation ==
- 13131 Kolkata–Anand Vihar Express runed from Kolkata Chitpur on a daily basis reaching Anand Vihar on the 2nd day
- 13132 Anand Vihar–Kolkata Express runs from Patna Junction on a daily basis reaching Kolkata Chitpur on the 2nd day.

The train was changed later to run between Kolkata Railway Station (Chitpur) to Patna Junction as the train used to run 15–20 hours late almost daily.
