= Electric Loco Shed, Bhusawal =

Loco shed in Maharashtra, India

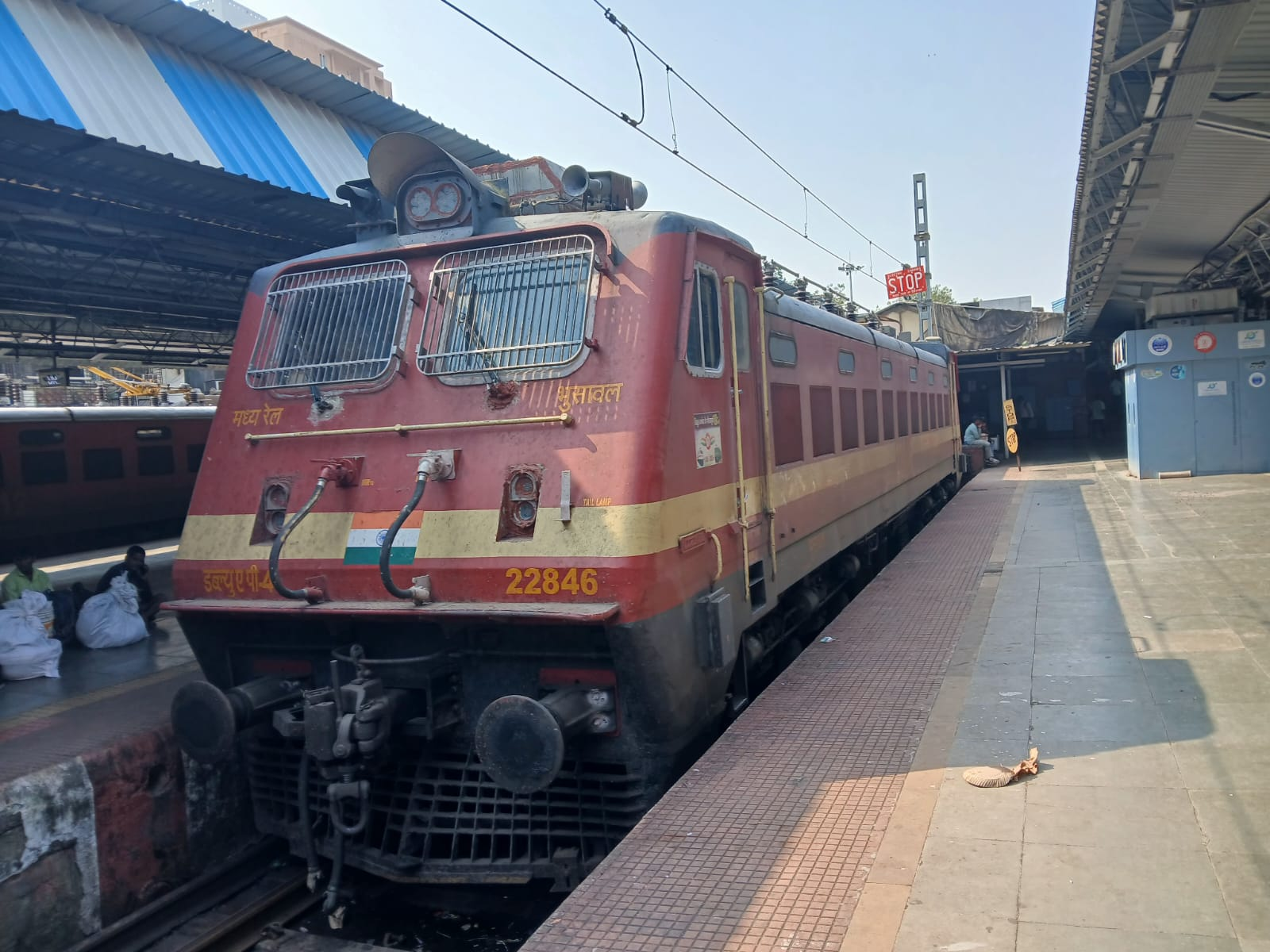
- BSL based WAP-4 at Dadar Central.

- Location within Maharashtra

Location
- Location: Bhusawal, Maharashtra
- Coordinates: 21.051850°N 75.810173°E

Characteristics
- Owner: Indian Railways
- Operator: Central Railway zone
- Depot code: BSL
- Type: Engine shed
- Roads: 6
- Rolling stock: WAP-4; WAG-5; WAG-7; WAG-9

History
- Opened: 1974; 52 years ago
- Former rolling stock: WAM-4; WAG-2; WAP-1

Electric Loco Shed, Bhusawal is a motive power depot performing locomotive maintenance and repair facility for electric locomotives of the Indian Railways, located at Bhusawal of the Central Railway in Maharashtra, India. It is one of the three electric locomotive sheds of the Central Railway, the others being at Kalyan (KYN) and Ajni.

== History ==
Steam locomotive sheds used to exist at Bhusawal until the late 1960s. Bhusawal used to be the largest steam shed (after World War II). After Central Railway set a deadline to eliminate all steam locomotive operations by 1990, a push was given towards establishing electric locomotion as the primary motive power, and the Steam locomotive sheds was decommissioned. To meet the needs of exponentially increasing rail traffic on the new continuous broad-gauge lines from Delhi to rest of India with the completion of gauge conversion, the Bhusawal was selected by Indian railways for a new electric locomotive shed.

The shed was originally built to handle locos for the freight traffic on the busy New Delhi – Bombay route. It started receiving WAG-2 from Asansol and WAP-1 locos. In Nov 2007 the WAP-1 locos were eventually transferred to Ghaziabad. It later got a large fleet of WAG-5 locos, Jhansi's entire fleet of WAP-4's locos in 2005 and WAG-7 in 2006. The shed also held a few WAM-4 units. All the WAM-4s of this shed have been retired/withdrawn from service. The WAG-7 units were later moved to other shed.

== Operations ==
Being one of the three electric loco sheds in the Central Railway, various major and minor maintenance schedules of electric locomotives are carried out here. It has the sanctioned capacity of 175 engine units. Beyond the operating capacity, this shed houses a total of 203 engine units. It also housed a WAM-4 locomotives temporarily. Electric Loco Shed, Bhusawal is now housing the largest fleet of WAP-1 in Indian Railways and it caters to many long-distance electric trains.

Like all locomotive sheds, BSL does regular maintenance, overhaul and repair including painting and washing of locomotives. It not only attends to locomotives housed at BSL but to ones coming in from other sheds as well. It has four pit lines for loco repair. Locomotives of Bhusawal ELS were the regular links for all trains running through Delhi when widespread electrification of railway lines started in Central Railways. It handled prestigious trains. BSL locomotives used to be predominantly the regular links for trains traveling to east as well.

== Livery and markings ==
WAP-4 and WAG-9 class have a standardized livery all over India.

== Locomotives ==
| Serial No. | Locomotive Class | Horsepower | Quantity |
|---|---|---|---|
| 1. | WAP-4 | 5350 | 71 |
| 2. | WAG-5 | 3850 | 38 |
| 3. | WAG-7 | 5350 | 25 |
| 4. | WAG-9 | 6120 | 170 |
| Total locomotives active as of October 2026 | | | 304 |
