= Indian locomotive class WAM-2 =

WAM-2
- Drawing of the locomotive.
Type and origin
- Power type: Electric
- Builder: Mitsubishi, Toshiba, Hitachi
- Build date: 1960–1964
- Total produced: 38 (36 WAM-2 + 2 WAM-3)
Specifications
- Configuration
  - AAR: B-B
  - UIC: Bo-Bo
- Gauge: 5 ft 6 in (1,676 mm)
- Bogies: 2 axle bogies with fabricated frame and swing bolster, axle hung traction motors
- Wheel diameter: 1,120 mm (3 ft 8 in)
- Length: 14.600 m (47 ft 10 13/16 in)
- Width: 3.152 m (10 ft 4 3/32 in)
- Height: 4.165 m (13 ft 7 31/32 in)
- Axle load: 19,000 kg (42,000 lb)
- Loco weight: 76,000 kg (168,000 lb)
- Electric system/s: 25 kV 50 Hz AC Overhead
- Current pickup: Pantograph
- Traction motors: Mitsubishi MB 3045-A (745hp, 725V, 815A, 1000 rpm, weight 2200kg).
- Loco brake: Air
- Train brakes: Vacuum
Performance figures
- Maximum speed: 120 km/h (75 mph)
- Power output: Maximum: 2,910 hp (2,170 kW); Continuous: 2,790 hp (2,081 kW)
- Tractive effort: Starting: 25,240 kgf (247.5 kN; 55,600 lbf)
Career
- Operators: Indian Railways
- Numbers: 20300-20335 (WAM-2); 20336-20337 (WAM-3)
- Locale: ER-SER-NER-NR
- First run: 1960
- Last run: early 2000s
- Preserved: None
- Disposition: All scrapped

The Indian locomotive classes WAM-2 and WAM-3 were 25 kV AC electric locomotives that were imported from Japan in the 1960s for Indian Railways. The model's name stands for broad gauge (W), alternating current (A), Mixed traffic (M) locomotive, 2nd generation (2). A total of 38 WAM-2/3 locomotives were built by a consortium, comprising Mitsubishi, Hitachi and Toshiba, between 1960 and 1964. These locomotives entered service in 1960.

The WAM-2 and WAM-3 classes served both passenger and freight trains for over 40 years. As of January 2020, these locomotives are no longer in service.

== History ==
These locomotives were built by a consortium of Mitsubishi, Hitachi and Toshiba (The Japanese Group, as attested by a plaque fixed on their sides) as an alternative to the European-built WAM-1. They were delivered in 1960 and were slightly less powerful than the WAM-1 but had similar Bo-Bo wheel arrangement (4 wheels per bogie) with four Mitsubishi DC traction motors connected to the wheels permanently in parallel through a WN geared drive. The WAM-2 had Ignitron rectifiers just like the WAM-1 but some were later refitted with Exciton rectifiers. Some even had the Mitsubishi logo painted on their sides.

38 locomotives were produced in two batches, with the initial batch of 10 locos having air brakes for the loco and vacuum train brakes, and the second batch of 26 having only vacuum brakes. These have not been retrofitted with air train brakes. Like the WAM-1, they were also used around the ER-SER-NER-NR circuit as it was the first AC electrified area and hauled ordinary passenger and freight trains and sometimes ran all the way to New Delhi via Kanpur. They were also used double-headed for freight trains. They had four traction motors permanently coupled in parallel are fed by ignitron rectifiers. Speed control is by a tap changer on the input transformer. Mitsubishi transformer, 20 taps. Oerlikon exhaust and compressor, Arno rotary converter. They were based at Asansol Loco Shed of Eastern Railways.

In February 1980, the WAM-2/3 classes had their top speed increased from 100 km/h to 120 km/h by RDSO. This was done for haulage of the Howrah Rajdhani between Howrah and Ghaziabad on the Eastern and Northern railway division respectively. When the Sealdah suburban system was electrified under AC, there was a shortage of AC-voltage electric multiple units, and so on an interim basis some WAM-2 units were used on push-pull rakes (with the WAM-2 sandwiched in the middle) until the supplies were received, and ER also retrofitted DC EMU stock, though the latter largely operated in the Howrah division, which required dual-voltage capability.

Circulars at that time claimed that the withdrawal of the WAM-2 locomotives should be done because they had reached their design lifespan of 35 years. Since they had less than five years of service life remaining, the vacuum brake-fitted WAM-2/3 locomotives were never considered for retrofitting with air or dual brakes. The lifespan of certain WAM-2/3 locos could have certainly been extended another five years of revenue service since they were in great condition. Instead, orders were in place to rapidly decommission these locos. It happened in such a hurry that not a single WAM-2/WAM-3 locomotive could be preserved or plinthed in process.

== Subclasses ==
=== WAM-3 ===
The WAM-3 class consisted of two modified WAM2 locomotives, #20333 and #20337 of the Asansol ASN shed of Eastern Railway. They were rebuilt with their pantographs aligned the other way around (pointing outwards) and fitted with silicon diode rectifiers as permanent features, thereby increasing their performance and durability, but were identical to the WAM-2 in every other respect. As WAM-4s became more common the WAM-3 were relegated to secondary passenger and shunting duties.

=== WAP-2 ===
Four WAM-2s of Asansol shed were re-geared with the intention of increasing the speed of the class. The Bo-Bo bogies and WN geared drives of the WAM-2 were replaced by Flexcoil fabricated bogies and axle-hung traction motors respectively. These ran for quite some time and even hauled the Howrah Rajdhani for some time but were decommissioned in the late 1980s. The Indian Railways Fan Club has called the locomotive design an "odd experiment".

== Preserved locomotives ==
All locomotives of this class have been withdrawn from service, and none were preserved.

== See also ==
- Locomotives of India
- Indian locomotive class WAG-2
- Indian locomotive class WAM-1
- Indian locomotive class YAM-1
