= Indian locomotive class YAM-1 =

Indian YAM-1
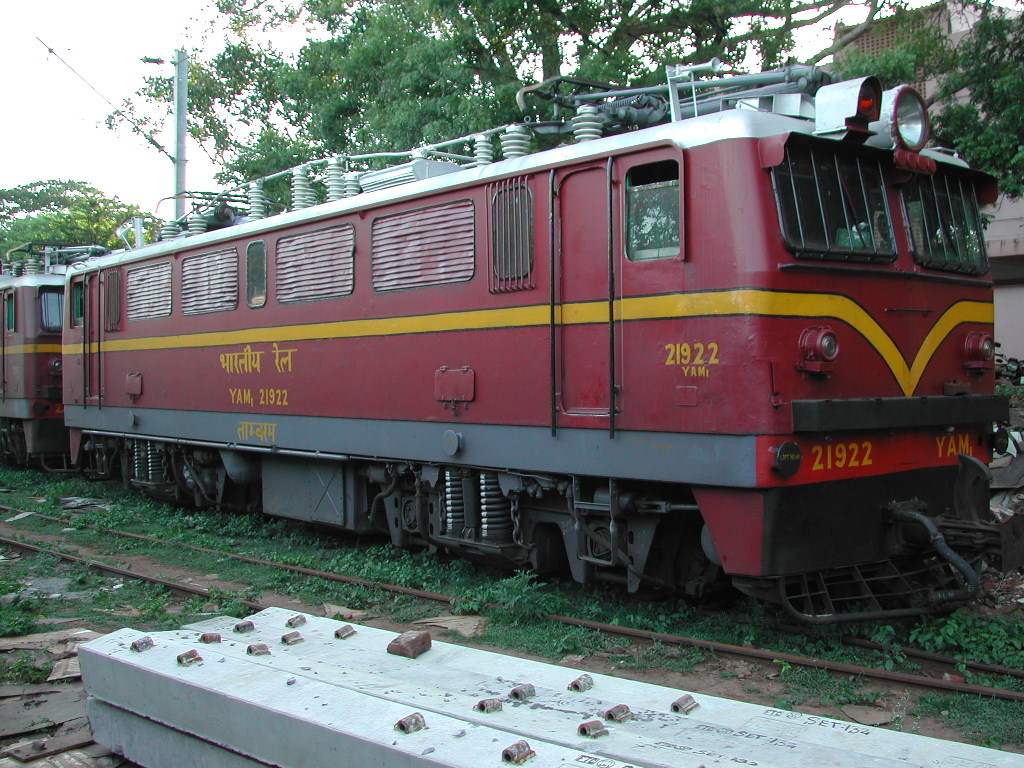
- YAM-1 locomotive No. 21922 preserved at Chittaranjan Locomotive Works, February 2007
Type and origin
- Power type: Electric
- Builder: Mitsubishi; Hitachi; Toshiba
- Serial number: Mitsubishi 1238–1255, 1378–1379
- Build date: 1964–1966
- Total produced: YAM-1: 20
Specifications
- Configuration
  - UIC: B′B′
- Gauge: 1,000 mm (3 ft 3 3/8 in)
- Loco weight: 52 tonnes (114,600 lb)
- Electric system/s: 25 kV AC overhead
- Current pickup(s): Two Faively AM-12 pantographs
- Traction motors: Two ACEC/Alstom/Siemens MG1420 truck-mounted of 1250 V DC; 3.95:1 gear ratio
- Transmission: One Mitsubishi 'Shell Sub', 1690-kVA, 25-tap transformer; four 510 A, 1250 V, type A268, Secheron excitron rectifiers
- Loco brake: Air
- Train brakes: Vacuum
Performance figures
- Maximum speed: 80 km/h (50 mph)
- Power output: 1,300 kW (1,740 hp)
- Tractive effort: 191 kN (19,500 kgf; 42,900 lbf)
Career
- Operators: Indian Railways’ Southern Railway zone
- Class: YAM-1
- Numbers: 21904–21923
- Nicknames: Pallava King, Vaigai Special
- Locale: Southern Railway (India)
- Withdrawn: 30 June 2004
- Preserved: 21909 at Regional Rail Museum, Chennai; 21912 at CLW Loco Park; 21922 at Tambaram EMU Shed

The Indian locomotive class YAM-1 is a class of metre gauge (Y), Alternating Current (A), mixed traffic (M) electric locomotives in India. Twenty were built in 1964–66 by a Japanese consortium led by Mitsubishi.

== Background ==
When the Madras (now Chennai) to Tambaram line was electrified in 1931, the 1500 V DC system was originally used. As part of an extension of the electrification to Villupuram in 1965, the whole section was converted to the 25 kV AC system. Eighteen YAM-1 locomotives (later extended to 20), and YAU-1 4-car electric multiple units were built for service on the network.

== Design ==
Builders plate on a YAM-1. Note the year of manufacture at the bottom

The YAM-1 locomotives were supplied in batches by Mitsubishi in 1964–66 (four in 1964, 14 in 1965 and two in 1966). They were jointly built by Mitsubishi, Toshiba and Hitachi, as shown by their builders' plates. They are of the B-B configuration, with two monomotor bogies, each with one bogie-mounted DC traction motor; the two traction motors were permanently coupled in parallel. They had an Oerlikon compressor and exhauster for the locomotive's air brakes and the train's vacuum brakes, and Arno rotatory converters. They were equipped with two Faively AM-12 pantographs.

== Service ==
They were not very powerful—they had a power output of 1.3 MW (1,740 hp), a starting tractive effort of 191 kN (19,500 kgf; 42,900 lbf), a maximum speed of 80 km/h (50 mph), and a weight of 52 tonnes (114,600 lb). They were given the fleet numbers 21904–21923.

They were used on the electrified metre gauge lines of the Southern Railway zone of Indian Railways, usually in the Chennai area. With the conversion of the main lines to 1,676 mm (5 ft 6 in) (broad) gauge, they were relegated to departmental service, although fifty-wagon goods trains were occasionally handled.

In their latter days, all 20 locomotives were allocated to Tambaram Electric Shed. The last use of a YAM-1 was on 30 June 2004, not long after the last EMU service on Chennai network reached Tambaram.

One unit has been preserved at Chittaranjan Locomotive Works.

== Locomotive shed ==
- All the locomotives of this class has been withdrawn from service.

== See also ==
- Indian locomotive class WAM-2/3
- Rail transport in India#History
- Indian Railways
- Locomotives of India
- Rail transport in India
