= Electric Loco Shed, Ghaziabad =

Loco shed in Uttar Pradesh, India

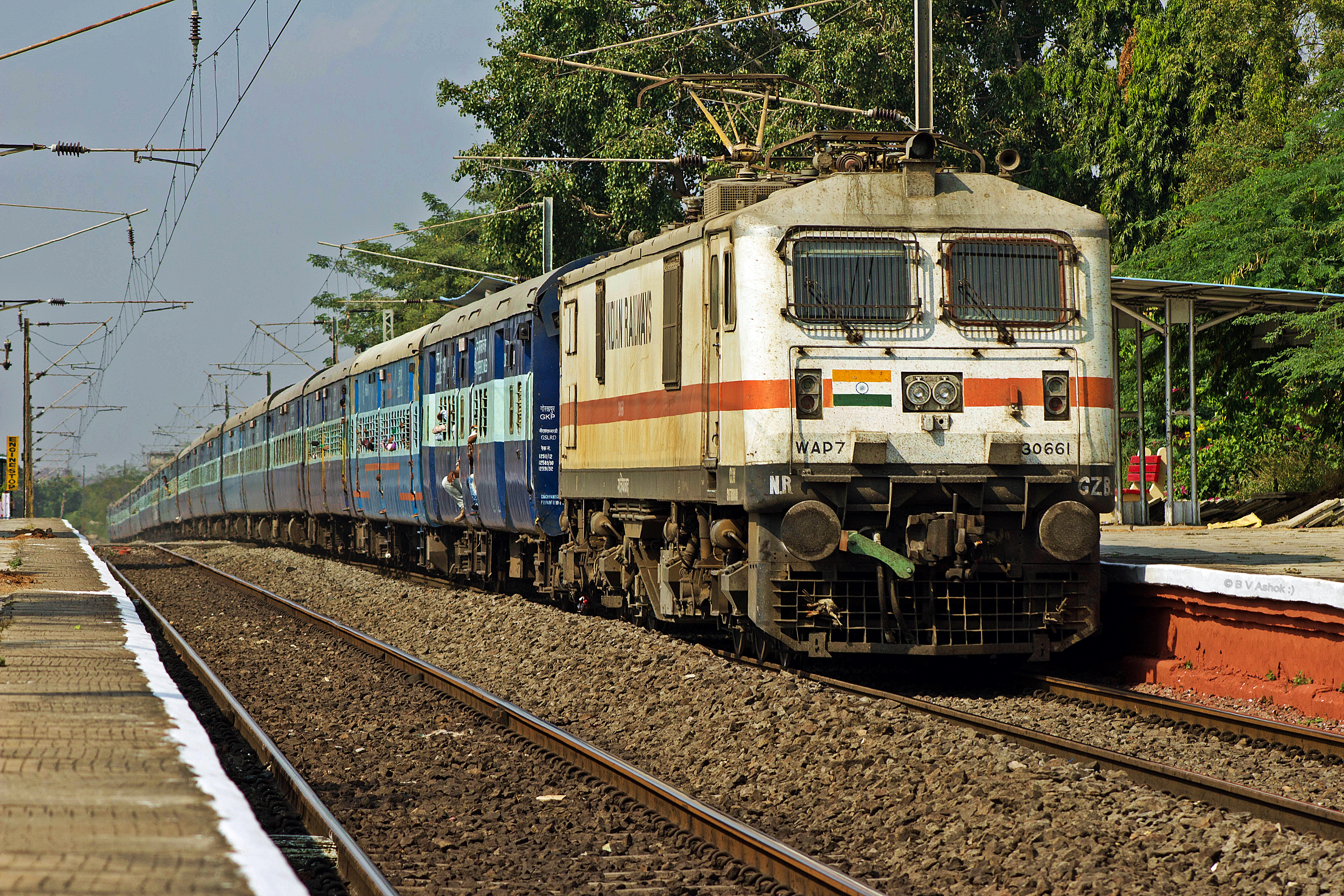
- GZB based WAP-7 hauling Raptisagar Express.

- Location within Uttar Pradesh

Location
- Location: Ghaziabad, Uttar Pradesh
- Coordinates: 28.646939°N 77.432491°E

Characteristics
- Owner: Indian Railways
- Operator: Northern Railways
- Depot code: GZB
- Type: Engine shed
- Roads: 6
- Rolling stock: WAP-5; WAP-7; WAG-9

History
- Opened: 1976; 50 years ago
- Former rolling stock: WAP-1; WAP-4; WAG-5; WAM-4

Electric Loco Shed, Ghaziabad is a motive power depot performing locomotive maintenance and repair facility for electric locomotives of the Indian Railways, located at Ghaziabad Junction of the Northern Railway zone in Uttar Pradesh, India. It is one of the two electric locomotive sheds of the Northern Railway, the others being at Ludhiana (LDH) .

== History ==
Steam locomotive sheds used to exist at Ghaziabad until the late 1960s. After Northern Railway set a deadline to eliminate all steam locomotive operations by 1990, a push was given towards establishing electric locomotion as the primary motive power, and the Steam locomotive sheds was decommissioned. To meet the needs of exponentially increasing rail traffic on the new continuous broad-gauge lines from Delhi to rest of India with the completion of gauge conversion, the Ghaziabad was selected by Indian railways for a new electric locomotive shed.

New Electric locomotive shed was inaugurated in the late 1976s with WAM-4 which stayed until late 2009, when they were transferred to other sheds. It later got a large fleet of WAG-5 locos, but later these were then moved to Ludhiana. All WAP-1 locos from Arakkonam and Mughalsarai shed were transferred here for hauling rajdhani expresses. The brand new from ABB were directly allocated to ghaziabad after arrival in India. New WAP-7 locos were acquired in 2000s. The shed also held a single WAM-4 units which is earmarked for preservation.

== Operations ==
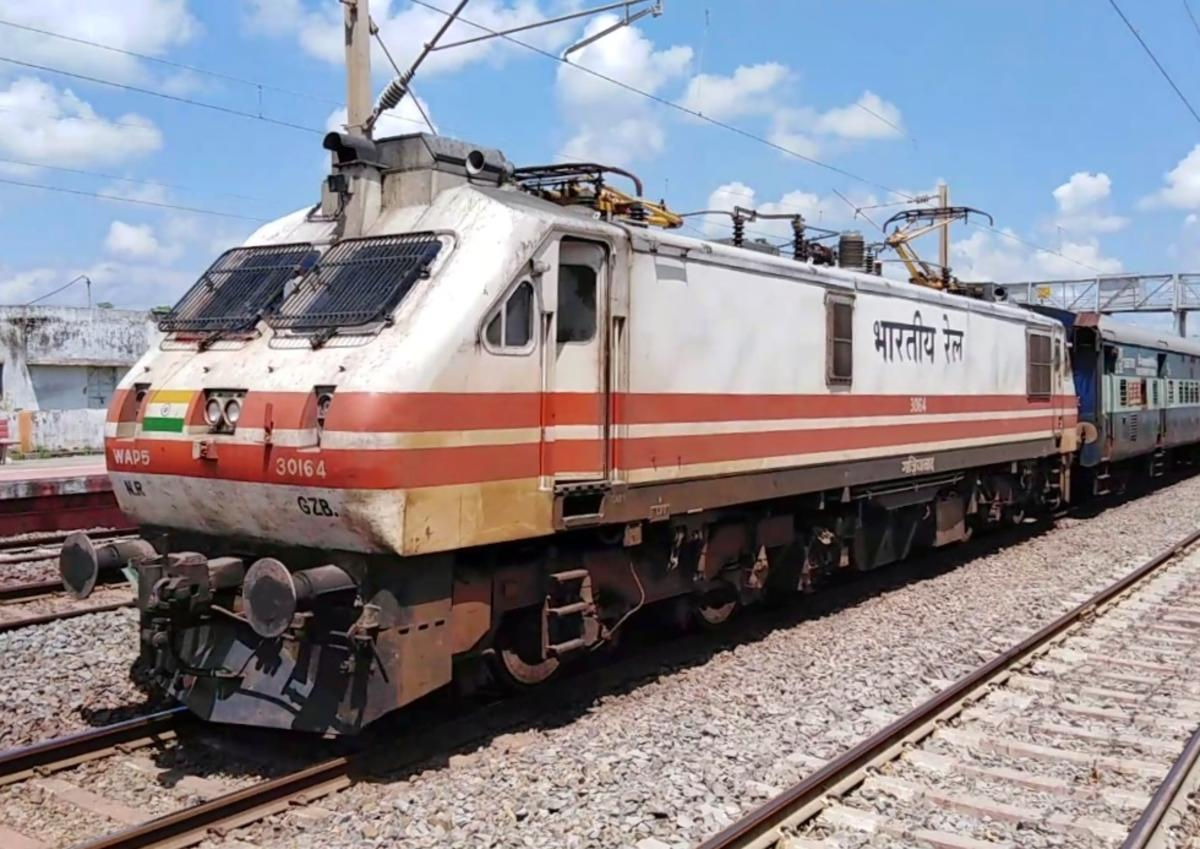
Ghaziabad based WAP-5 in aerodynamic cab hauling Rupashi Bangla Express.

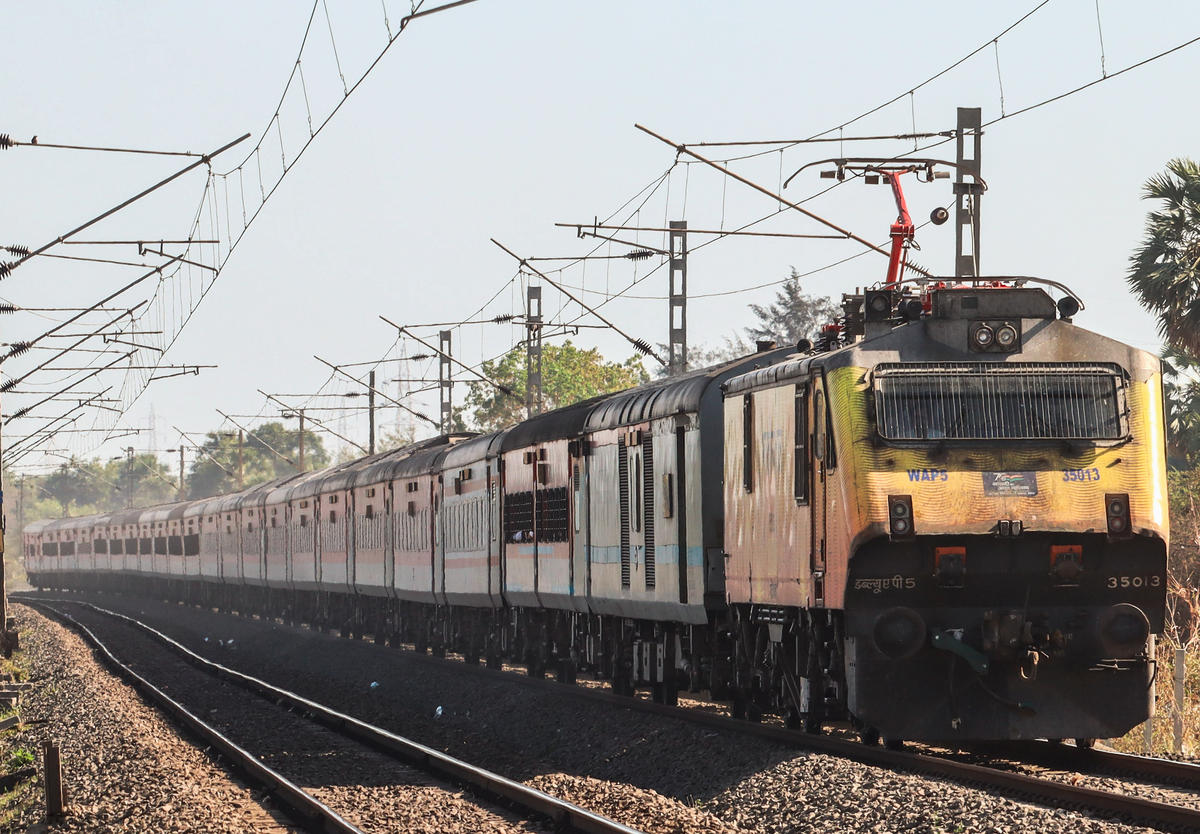
Ghaziabad based WAP-5 in Tejas Express livery hauling Indore-Kochuveli Express.

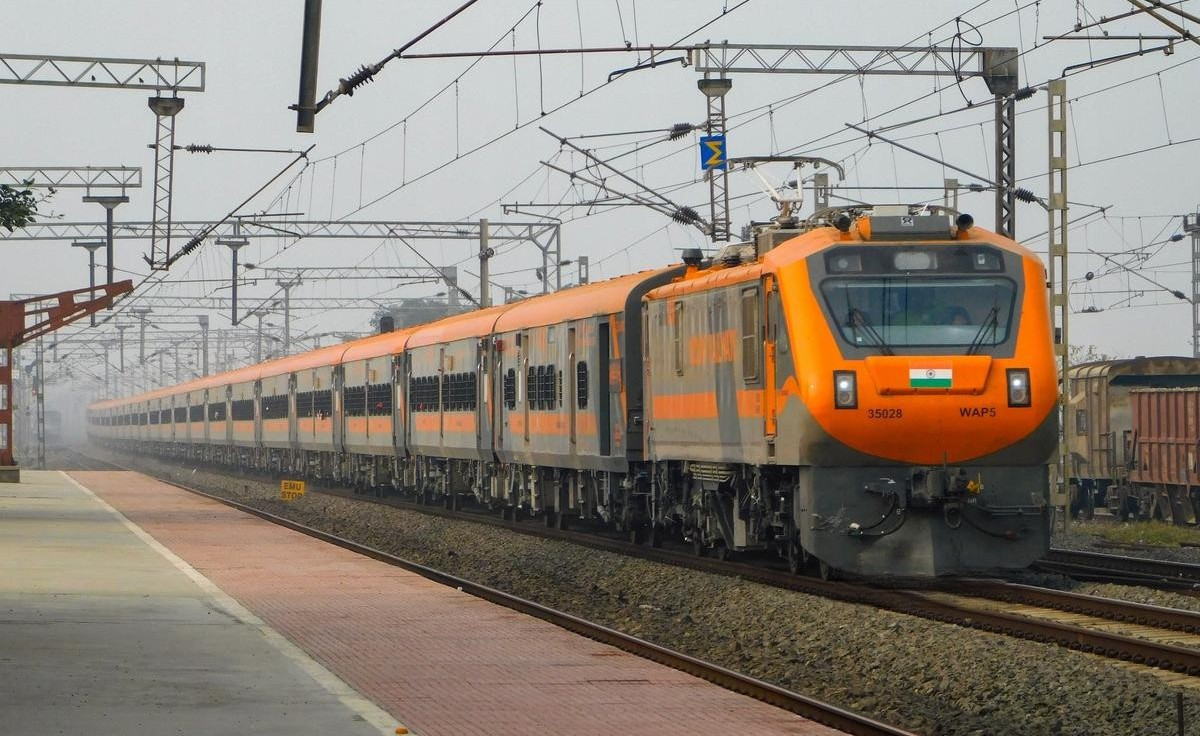
Ghaziabad based WAP-5 in Amrit Bharat Express livery hauling Malda Town-SMVT Bengaluru Amrit Bharat Express.

Being one of the three electric engine sheds in Northern Railway, various major and minor maintenance schedules of electric locomotives are carried out here. It has the sanctioned capacity of 200 Locos.Expansion work on Progress to 225 Locos.Total 293 Electric locos Holding at GZB ELS, including 137 WAP-5 and 155 WAP-7. It also housed a WAM-4 locomotives temporarily. Electric loco Shed, Ghaziabad is now housing the largest fleet of WAP-5 in Indian Railways and it caters to many long-distance electric trains.

Like all locomotive sheds, GZB does regular maintenance, overhaul and repair including painting and washing of locomotives. It not only attends to locomotives housed at GZB but to ones coming in from other sheds as well. It has four pit lines for loco repair. Locomotives of Ghaziabad ELS were the regular links for all trains running through Delhi when widespread electrification of railway lines started in Northern Railways. It handled prestigious trains like Howrah Rajdhani Express and Mumbai Rajdhani Express. GZB locomotives used to be predominantly the regular links for trains traveling to east as well.

== Locomotives ==
Serial No.	Locomotive Class	Horsepower	Quantity
1.	WAP-5	6120	107
2.	WAP-7	6350	162
3.	WAG-5	3800	1
4.	WAG-9	6120	34
Total locomotives active as of June 2026			304
