= Electric Loco Shed, Howrah =

Loco shed in West Bengal, India

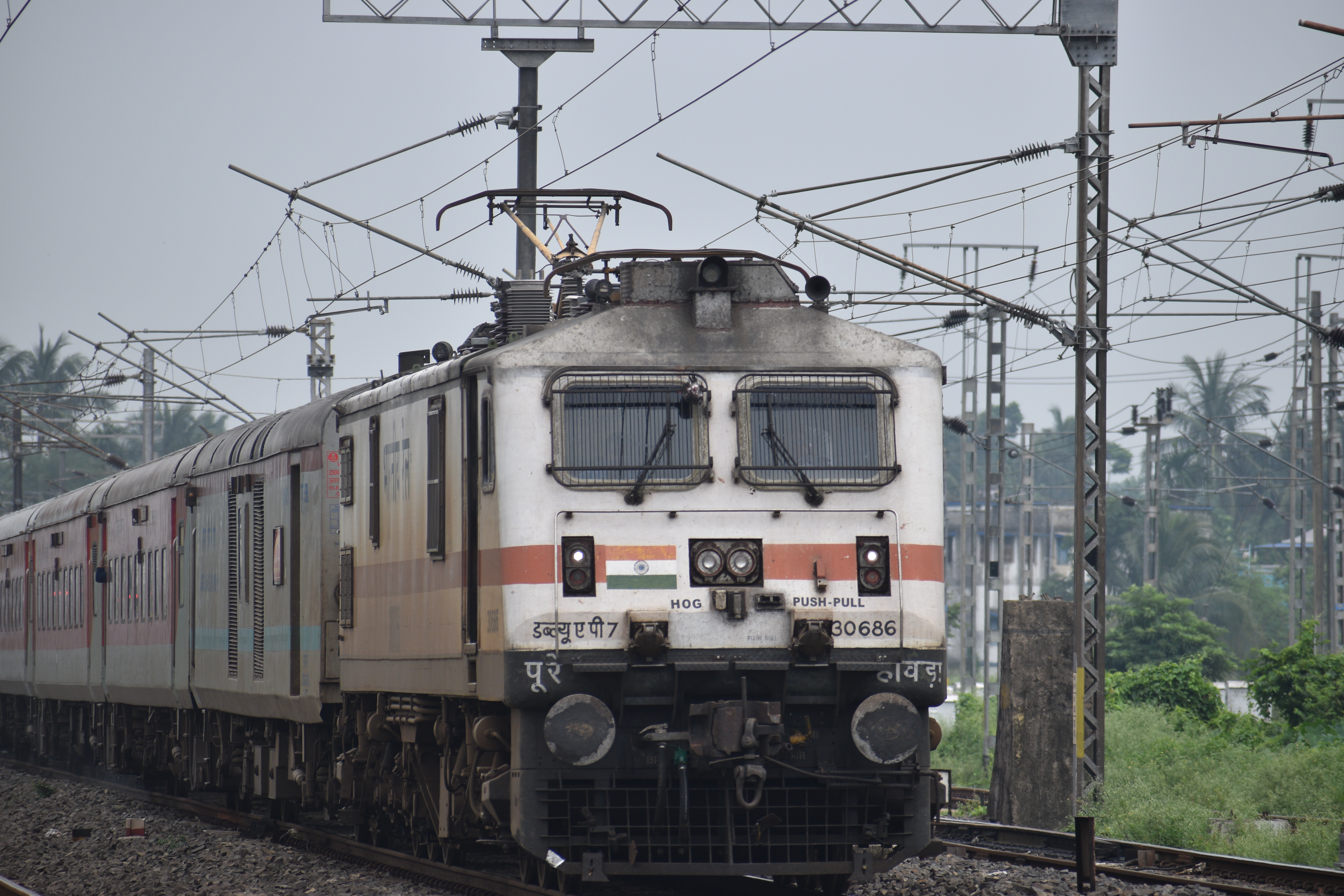
- HWH based WAP-7 with Howrah - New Delhi Rajdhani Express.

- Location within Kolkata

Location
- Location: Howrah, West Bengal
- Coordinates: 22.604813°N 88.335240°E

Characteristics
- Owner: Indian Railways
- Operator: Eastern Railway zone
- Depot code: HWH
- Type: Engine shed
- Roads: 6
- Rolling stock: WAP-4; WAP-5; WAP-7

History
- Opened: 2001; 25 years ago
- Former rolling stock: WAP-1; WAM-4; WAG-9

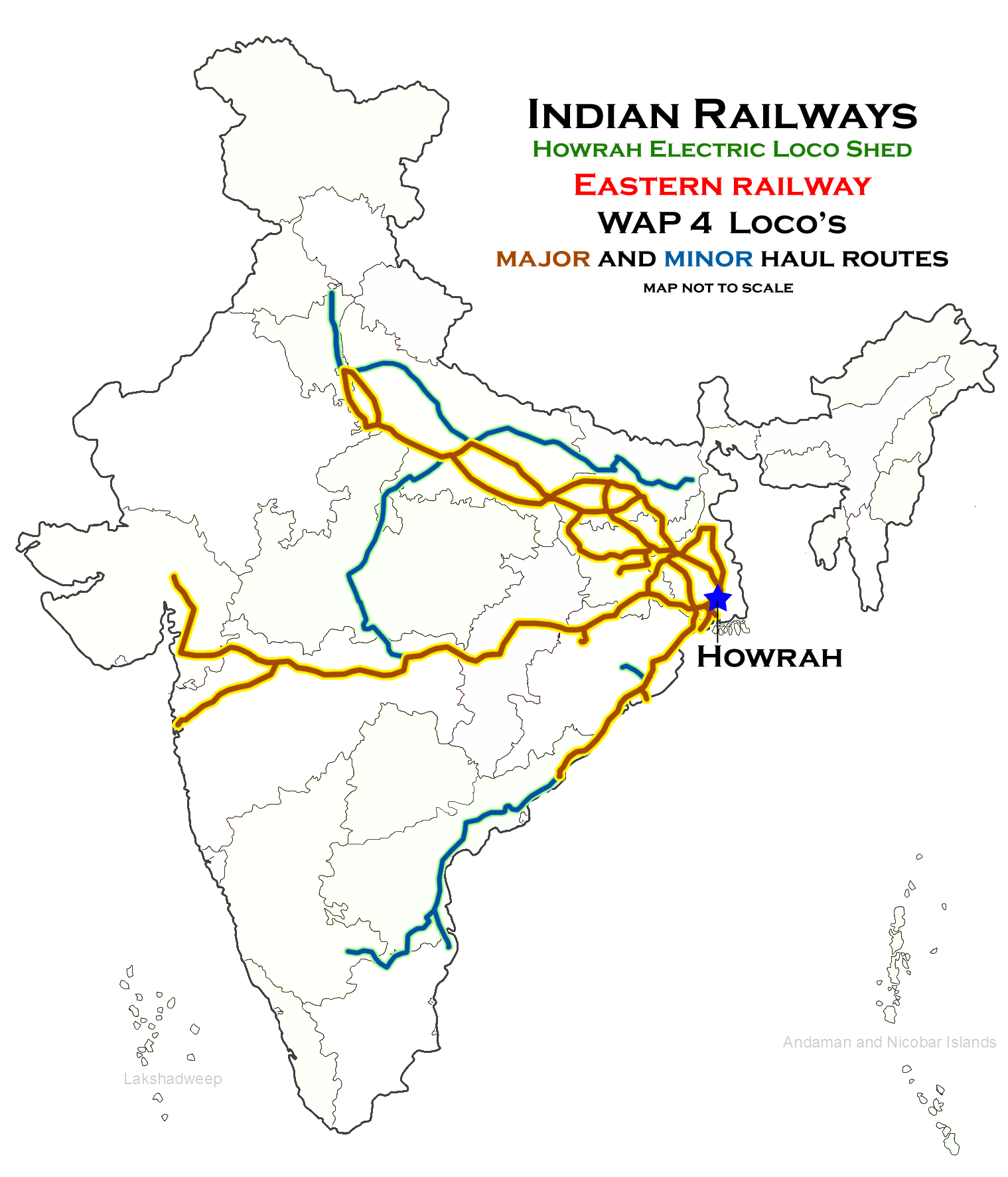
Route haul map of HWH ELS (Howrah Electric Loco shed) locomotives

Electric Loco Shed, Howrah is a motive power depot performing locomotive maintenance and repair facility for electric locomotives of the Indian Railways, located at Howrah of the Eastern Railway zone in West Bengal, India. It is one of the two electric locomotive sheds of the Eastern Railway, the others being at Asansol (ASN).

== History ==
Steam locomotive sheds used to exist at Howrah until the late 1970s. After Eastern Railway set a deadline to eliminate all steam locomotive operations by 1990, a push was given towards establishing electric locomotion as the primary motive power, and the steam locomotive sheds was decommissioned. To meet the needs of exponentially increasing rail traffic on the new continuous broad-gauge lines from Kolkata to rest of India with the completion of gauge conversion, the Howrah was selected by Indian Railways for a new electric locomotive shed.

New electric locomotive shed was inaugurated in the late 2001s with WAP-1 from Ghaziabad which stayed until late 2005, when they were transferred back to Ghaziabad again. It later got a large fleet of WAP-4 locos, but later some of these were then moved to Asansol. All WAP-6 locos from Asansol shed converted to WAP-4 units and transferred here. New WAP-7 locos were acquired in 2011. In October 2019, Howrah ELS got its first WAP-5 locomotive from Vadodara.

The shed also held a few WAM-4 units. All the WAM-4s of this shed have been retired/withdrawn from service.

== Operations ==
Being one of the three electric engine sheds in Eastern Railway, various major and minor maintenance schedules of electric locomotives are carried out here. It has the sanctioned capacity of 175 engine units. Beyond the operating capacity, this shed houses a total of 207 engine units, including 90 WAP-4 and 19 WAP-7. It also housed a few WAM-4 locomotives temporarily. Electric Loco Shed, Howrah is now housing the 2nd largest fleet of WAP-4 in Indian Railways and it caters to many long-distance electric trains.

Like all locomotive sheds, HWH does regular maintenance, overhaul and repair including painting and washing of locomotives. It not only attends to locomotives housed at HWH but to ones coming in from other sheds as well. It has four pit lines for loco repair. Locomotives of Howrah ELS along with Asansol and Royapuram ELS were the regular links for all trains running through West Bengal when widespread electrification of railway lines started in Eastern Railways. It handled prestigious trains like the Howrah Rajdhani Express. HWH locomotives used to be predominantly the regular links for trains traveling to north as well.

== Livery and markings ==
Though WAP-4 class have a standardized livery all over India, Howrah WAP-4 locomotives can easily be recognized by their blood red with incomplete yellow band. Though WAP-5 class have a standardized livery all over India, two of Howrah WAP-5 with numbers 30106 and 30112 have brand advertisement of Fortune Biryani special Basmati Rice and another Howrah WAP-5 with number 30115 has brand advertisement of Fortune Edible Oils.

== Locomotives ==
Serial No.	Locomotive Class	Horsepower	Quantity
1.	WAP-4	5350	42
2.	WAP-5	6120	32
3.	WAP-7	6350	104
Total locomotives active as of June 2026			178
