= Indian locomotive class WAG-3 =

Type and origin
- Power type: Electric
- Builder: Kraus-Maffei, Krupp, SFAC, La Brugeoise & Nivelle (50 cycles European group)
- Build date: 1965
- Total produced: 10
Specifications
- Configuration
  - AAR: B-B
  - UIC: B-B
- Gauge: 5 ft 6 in (1,676 mm)
- Bogies: Monomotor B-B bogies
- Wheel diameter: New: 1,140 mm (3 ft 9 in); Half worn: 1,120 mm (3 ft 8 in); Full worn: 1,064 mm (3 ft 6 in)
- Length: 14.600 m (47 ft 10 13/16 in)
- Width: 3.109 m (10 ft 2 13/32 in)
- Height: 4.165 m (13 ft 7 31/32 in)
- Axle load: 18,640 kg (41,090 lb)
- Loco weight: 74,000 kg (163,000 lb)
- Electric system/s: 25 kV 50 Hz AC AC Overhead
- Current pickup(s): Pantograph
- Traction motors: AGEC make, type 1580 A1 (1270V, 1040A, 680 rpm. Weight 5850kg.) Bogie mounted.
- Loco brake: Air
- Train brakes: Vacuum
Performance figures
- Maximum speed: 112 km/h (70 mph)
- Power output: Max: 2,930 hp (2,185 kW); Continuous: 2,930 hp (2,185 kW)
- Tractive effort: Starting: 25,000 kgf (250 kN; 55,000 lbf)
Career
- Operators: Indian Railways
- Numbers: 20869–20878
- Locale: All over India
- Disposition: Withdrawn from service and all scrapped

The Indian locomotive class WAG-3 was a class of 25 kV AC electric locomotives that was imported from Europe in the mid 1960s for Indian Railways. The model name stands for broad gauge (W), AC Current (A), Goods traffic (G) engine, 3rd (3). A total of 10 WAG-3 locomotives were built by The European Group 50 Hz Group/European Group/50 Cycles Group (consortium) in 1965, and entering service in the same year.

The WAG-3 served mainly freight trains for over 35 years. As of January 2020, all locomotives of this class have been withdrawn from service and scrapped.

== History ==
Ten locomotives of this type were ordered from European Group. All these locomotives have been assembled in Europe. The first locomotive was put in service in July 1965. The typical feature of these locomotives was a Monomotor bogie. This construction resulted in substantial saving in weight in traction equipment and gives better adhesion. These locomotives utilize silicon rectifiers for conversion of AC power into DC. The traction motors were force ventilated and are fully suspended type. These motors are permanently grouped in parallel and controlled by tap changer and field weakening. The traction motors for the WAG-3 were two units of Alstom MG1580A1 which output 23% more top power than the WAG-1. This can be used for a multiple unit operation to a maximum of four locomotives. Compressed air brake for the loco and vacuum brake for the train are provided. In addition, these locomotives have been provided with rheostatic braking. The WAG-4 is based on this class.

== Specification ==
- Build dates: 1963-66
- Wheel arrangement: B-B ( monomotor bogies )
- Traction motors:AGEC make, type 1580 A1 (1270V, 1040A, 680 rpm. Weight 5850 kg.) Bogie mounted.
- Gear ratio: 3.95:1
- Transformer: Oerlikon BOT 3460. 32 taps.
- Rectifiers: Two GL 82220 silicon rectifiers, 1000A/1270 kW/1270V. Weight 650 kg each.
- Axle load: 21.3 t
- Max. Haulage: 1820 t
- Pantographs: Two Faiveley AM-12

== Locomotive shed ==
- All locomotives of this class have been withdrawn from service.

== See also ==
- Rail transport in India#History
- Indian Railways
- Locomotives of India
- Rail transport in India
