= Indian locomotive class WAG-5 =

Indian Railway freight class electric locomotive

WAG-5
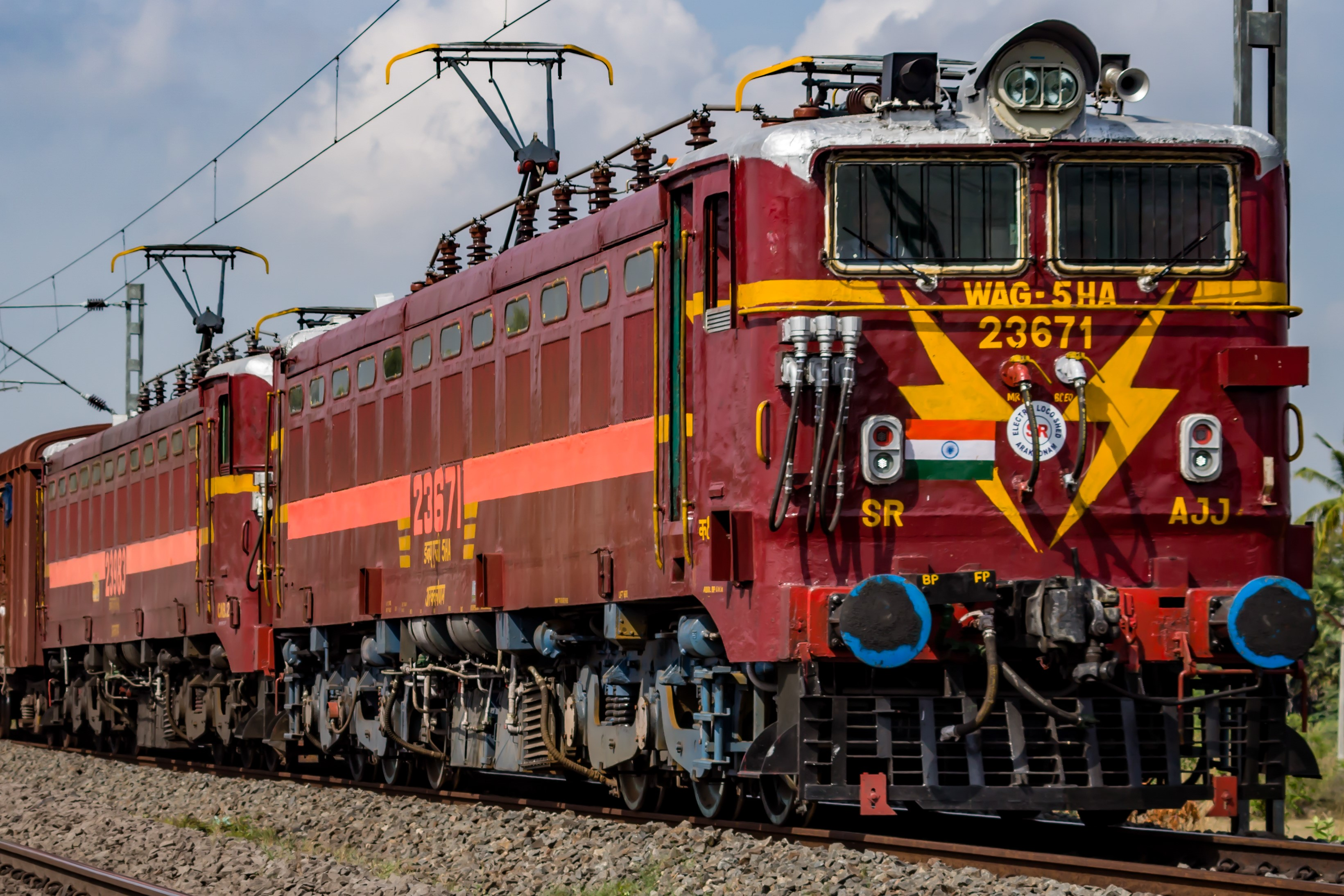
- Arakkonam based WAG-5HA twins hauling freight train near Thiruvallur.
Type and origin
- Power type: Electric
- Builder: Chittaranjan Locomotive Works (CLW), Bharat Heavy Electricals Limited (BHEL).
- Build date: Original: 1978–1998; WAG-5A: 1983–1988; WAG-5B: 1978–1983
- Total produced: 1,196
Specifications
- Configuration
  - UIC: Co′Co′
- Gauge: 5 ft 6 in (1,676 mm)
- Bogies: ALCO Asymmetric cast frame trimount
- Wheel diameter: New: 1,092 mm (3 ft 7 in); Half worn: 1,055 mm (3 ft 5 1/2 in); Full worn: 1,016 mm (3 ft 4 in)
- Length: 17.162 m (56 ft 3 11/16 in)
- Width: 3.055 m (10 ft 1/4 in)
- Height: 1.997 m (6 ft 6 5/8 in)
- Axle load: 20 tonnes (20 long tons; 22 short tons)
- Loco weight: 119 tonnes (117 long tons; 131 short tons)
- Electric system/s: 25 kV 50 Hz AC Overhead
- Current pickup: Pantograph
- Traction motors: Alstom TAO 659/Hitachi HS15250A
- MU working: 4
- Loco brake: Air/Hand
- Train brakes: Air, Dual and Vacuum
- Safety systems: Slip control, Main overload relay, Over voltage relay, No volt relay, Earth fault relay, Low pressure governor, Train parting alarms, Vigilance Control Device (VCD) and Brake cylinder cutoff valve
Performance figures
- Maximum speed: 105 km/h (65 mph); 100 km/h (62 mph); 80 km/h (50 mph)
- Power output: Continuous: 3,850 hp (2,870 kW)
- Tractive effort
  - Starting: 37,500 kgf (370 kN)
  - Continuous: 33,600 kgf (330 kN)
- Factor of adh.: 0.29
Career
- Operators: Indian Railways
- Numbers: 21100–21153, 23000–23999, 24000–24075, 24401-24466
- Nicknames: Krishnaveni, Navdoot, Minkalan, Pasumai, Priyadarshini, Basanti, Srilata, Nouvion, Gurudev, Chetak, Nasbandhi, Janmashati, Ajay, Kirtimaan, Cheetah
- Locale: All over India
- Disposition: Active

The Indian locomotive class WAG-5 is a class of 25 kV AC electric locomotives that was developed in 1978 by Chittaranjan Locomotive Works for Indian Railways. The model name stands for broad gauge (W), alternating current (A), goods traffic (G) engine, 5th generation (5). They entered service in 1980. A total of 1,196 WAG-5 were built at CLW and BHEL between 1978 and 1998, which made them the most numerous class of mainline electric locomotive until the introduction of its successor, the WAG-7.

The WAG-5 is one of the most successful locomotives of Indian Railways currently serving both freight and passenger trains for over 43 years. This class provided the basic design for a number of other locomotives, like WAG-7 and the WCM-6. However, with the advent of new 3-phase locomotives like WAG-9 and WAG-12, the WAG-5 locomotives were relegated to hauling smaller passenger trains and now the aging fleet of WAG-5 locomotives is rapidly being withdrawn from mainline duties and scrapped.

== Subclasses and modifications ==
The WAG-5A and WAG-5H(x) variants are fitted with Alstom and Hitachi traction motors respectively, whereas the WAG-5B are units converted from the WAM-4, and the WAG-5P(x) is a subclass specialised for passenger duties. The WAG-5(x)D and WAG-5(x)E are respectively fitted with dual and air brakes. WAG-5RH and WAG-5HR are fitted with rheostatic or friction braking. Another variant is WAG-5HG. The units with additional '6P' markings have parallel grouped traction motors. BHEL-built units are classified as WAG-5HB. Some units are fitted with Static Converter (STC), Microprocessor, Dynamic brake resistors (DBR) and SI unit.

Due to the advent of the WAG-7 and WAG-9 locomotives, the WAG-5s, except WAG-5HA/HB variants, occasionally hauled passenger trains despite being designed for freight haulage. WAG-5HB is homed at Jhansi shed near BHEL's installations for maintenance purposes. WAG-5 has a shell of the WAM-4. Units numbered until 23293 have side louvre and round glass windows like the WAM-4, and units after 23293 have louvres similar to those fitted to the WAG-7 for better ventilation. Recently, WAG-5 have been fitted with data loggers.

Due to the decline of tap changer control suppliers, unit 23026 was selected by RDSO for the adoption of thyristor controlled electricals in 1995. The project began in 1992, with the new prototype system, built in collaboration with the Bhabha Atomic Research Centre, was fitted in the locomotive between 1997 and 1998. Due to several problems such as interference with signalling equipment, the project was ceased in 1999, and the engine was rebuilt to original WAG-5 and designated as WAG-5P.

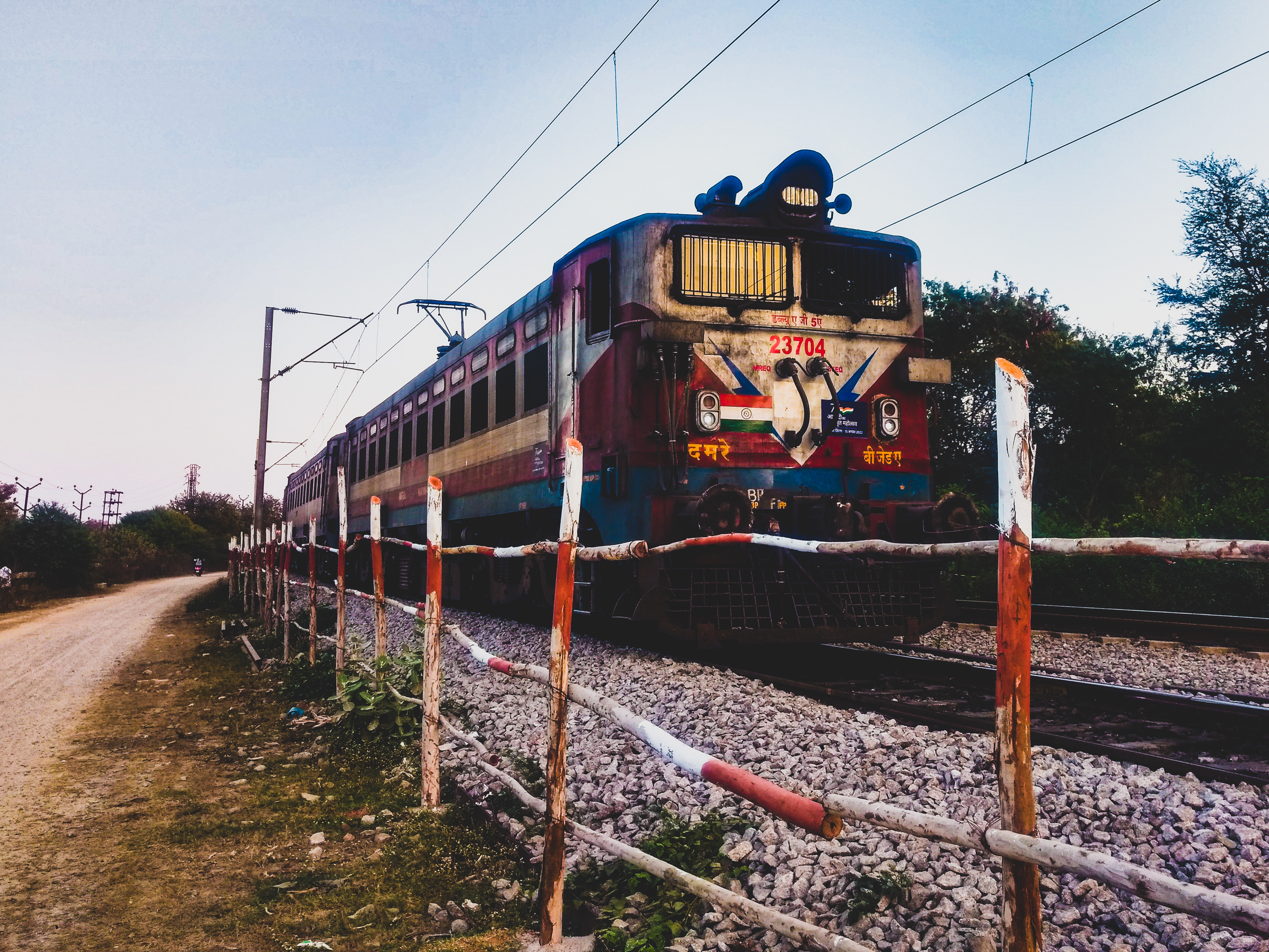
WAG-5 idling at the Ammuguda Bye pass line

== Technical specification ==
Traction Motors	Alstom TAO 659 (575 kW, 750 V, 1070 rpm) or TAO 656; or Hitachi HS 15250A. Axle-hung, nose-suspended. Six motors.
Gear Ratio	62:16 or 62:15 with Alstom motors, some 64:18 (Hitachi motors), many now 58:21 for mixed use. There are also 17:77
Transformer	BHEL, type HETT-3900. 3900 kVA, 22.5 kV, 182 A. 32 taps, 11730 kg, Forced oil cooling, 'A' Insulation.
Rectifiers	Silicon rectifiers (two) using 64 S-18FN-350 diodes each from Hind Rectifier. 2700 A / 1050 V per cubicle. 64 cells per bridge. Starting current at 3300 A. Motor (380 V, 970-1460 RPM)
Max Haulage capacity	2375 t (WAG-5 original)
Pantographs	Two Faiveley AM-12 of 285 kg with four insulators
Current Ratings	1100 A / 10 min, 750 A continuous
Sandboxes	8
Auxiliaries	2 Head lights (32 V, 250 W), Lead-acid Battery (50 cells, 110 V)
3 Elgi Compressors	3 motors (12.5 hp, 380 V)
2 SF India Ltd. Traction Motor blowers	MLBR-42.51-1-H4 type, 2 Siemens Motors (22 kW, 380 V, 41 A, 3000 rpm)
2 SF India Ltd. Smoothing reactor blower	2 motors(3 hp, 380V, 2860rpm)
BHEL Breaking resistor blower	Dy-3423M type, Moto r(532 kW, 70 hp, 325 V, 175 A, 3500 rpm)
2 SF India Ltd. Silicon rectifier blower	Axial type
SF India Ltd. Oil cooler blower	MLBH-60-1-H2 type, 22.2 m/hr, Motor (30 hp, 380 V, 6.6 A, 2865 rpm)
2 Smoothing reactors	SL42 type, 1250 V, 950 A, 0.00718 ohms at 110 °C
BEST & Co. Pvt. Ltd. Oil pump for transformer	Motor (3.3 kW, 380 V, 6.6 A, 2865 rpm)

== Locomotive sheds ==
Zone	Name	Shed Code	Quantity	
Zone	Name	Shed Code	WAG-5	WAG-5H
Central Railway	Bhusawal	BSLL	38	
Eastern Railway	Bardhaman	BWNX		18
Eastern Railway	Jamalpur	JMPD	16	5
North Central Railway	Jhansi	JHSE		48
North Eastern Railway	Gonda	GDDE	27	
Northern Railway	Ghaziabad	GZBE	1	
Northern Railway	Lucknow	AMVD	16	
Southern Railway	Arakkonam	AJJE		6
Southern Railway	Ernakulam	ERSX	12	6
Southern Railway	Erode	EDDX		46
South Coast Railway	Vijayawada	BZAE	33	
South Coast Railway	Visakhapatnam	WATE	8	
South Eastern Railway	Bondamunda	BNDL		2
Western Railway	Ratlam	RTMD		75
West Central Railway	Itarsi	ETD	37	72
West Central Railway	New Katni Jn.	NKJD		40
Total Locomotives Active as of October 2026			188	318

== See also ==
- Locomotives of India
- Rail transport in India
