= Indian locomotive class WAG-2 =

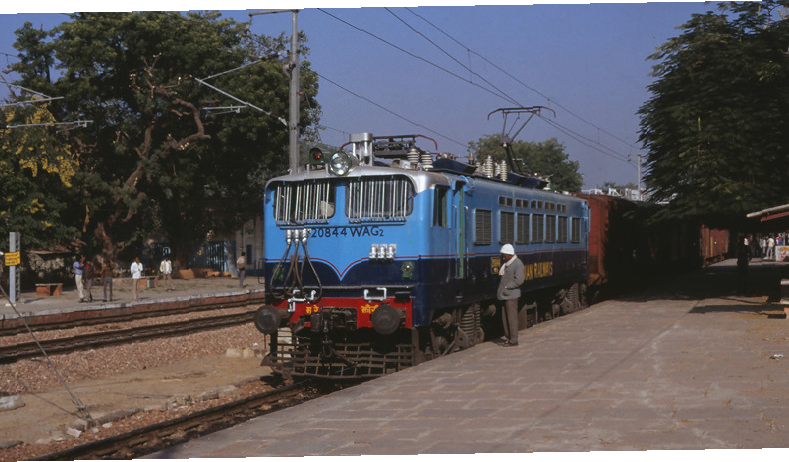
Type and origin
- Power type: Electric
- Builder: Mitsubishi, Toshiba, Hitachi
- Build date: 1964–1965
- Total produced: 45
Specifications
- Configuration
  - AAR: B-B
  - UIC: Bo-Bo
- Gauge: 5 ft 6 in (1,676 mm)
- Bogies: Monomotor B-B bogies
- Wheel diameter: New:1,140 mm (3 ft 9 in); Half worn: 1,120 mm (3 ft 8 in); Full worn: 1,064 mm (3 ft 6 in)
- Length: 14.600 m (47 ft 10 13/16 in)
- Width: 3.152 m (10 ft 4 3/32 in)
- Height: 4.165 m (13 ft 7 31/32 in)
- Axle load: 19,000 kg (42,000 lb)
- Loco weight: 76,000 kg (168,000 lb)
- Electric system/s: 25 kV 50 Hz AC overhead
- Current pickup: Pantograph
- Traction motors: Mitsubishi MB 3045-A (745hp, 725V, 815A, 1000 rpm, weight 2200 kg).
- Loco brake: Air
- Train brakes: Vacuum
Performance figures
- Maximum speed: 80 km/h (50 mph)
- Power output: Maximum: 3,500 hp (2,610 kW); Continuous: 3,450 hp (2,573 kW)
- Tractive effort: Starting: 25,240 kgf (247.5 kN; 55,600 lbf)
Career
- Operators: Indian Railways
- Numbers: 20804-848
- Locale: Eastern Railways, later relocated to Central Railways
- Retired: 2001
- Disposition: All scrapped

The Indian locomotive class WAG-2 was a class of 25 kV AC electric locomotives that was imported from Japan in the 1960s for Indian Railways. Its class designation denotes a broad gauge (W) alternating current (A) goods (G) locomotive of the 2nd generation (2). A total of 45 WAG-2 locomotives were built by The Japanese Group (a consortium of Mitsubishi, Hitachi and Toshiba) between 1964 and 1965. They entered service in 1964.

The WAG-2 served both passenger and freight trains for nearly 40 years. As of January 2001, all locomotives have been withdrawn from service and scrapped.

== History ==
These locomotives were built by a consortium of Mitsubishi, Hitachi and Toshiba (The Japanese Group, as attested by a plaque fixed on their sides) as an alternative to the European-built WAG-1. They were delivered in 1964 and had a greater horsepower rating than the WAM-1 but had similar Bo-Bo wheel arrangement (4 wheels per bogie) with four Hitachi DC traction motors connected to the wheels permanently in parallel through a WN geared drive. The WAG-2 had Ignitron rectifiers just like the WAG-1, but some were later refitted with Excitron rectifiers. Some even had the Mitsubishi logo painted on their sides.

None of the WAG-2s had been retrofitted with air train brakes. Like the WAG-1, they were also used around the ER-SER-NER-NR circuit as it was the first AC electrified area, and hauled ordinary passenger trains and freights only. They were also used double-headed on freight trains. They had four traction motors permanently coupled in parallel are fed by ignitron rectifiers. Speed control was by a tap changer on the input transformer. Mitsubishi transformer, 20 taps. Oerlikon exhauster and compressor, Arno rotary converter. They were based at Asansol Loco Shed of Eastern Railways and then transferred to Bhusawal and Itarsi sheds of Central Railways in 1985. Due to aging, the WAG-2 locomotives were withdrawn in 2001. None have been preserved.

== Specifications ==
- Manufacturer: The Japanese Group (consortium of Hitachi, Mitsubishi and Toshiba)
- Build dates: 1964–65
- Wheel arrangement: B-B (monomotor bogies like WAG-1)
- Traction Motors: Hitachi EFCO HKK (1270 kW, 1250 V, 1080 A, 695 rpm, weight 5300 kg).
- Transformer: Hitachi AFI AMOC. 32 taps.
- Rectifiers: AEV-48 silicon rectifiers, 2040 A / 2550 kW.
- Pantographs: Two Faiveley AM-12

== Locomotive shed ==
- All locomotives of this class have been withdrawn from service and scrapped.

== See also ==
- Rail transport in India#History
- Indian Railways
- Locomotives of India
- Rail transport in India
