= Indian locomotive class WAM-1 =

WAM-1
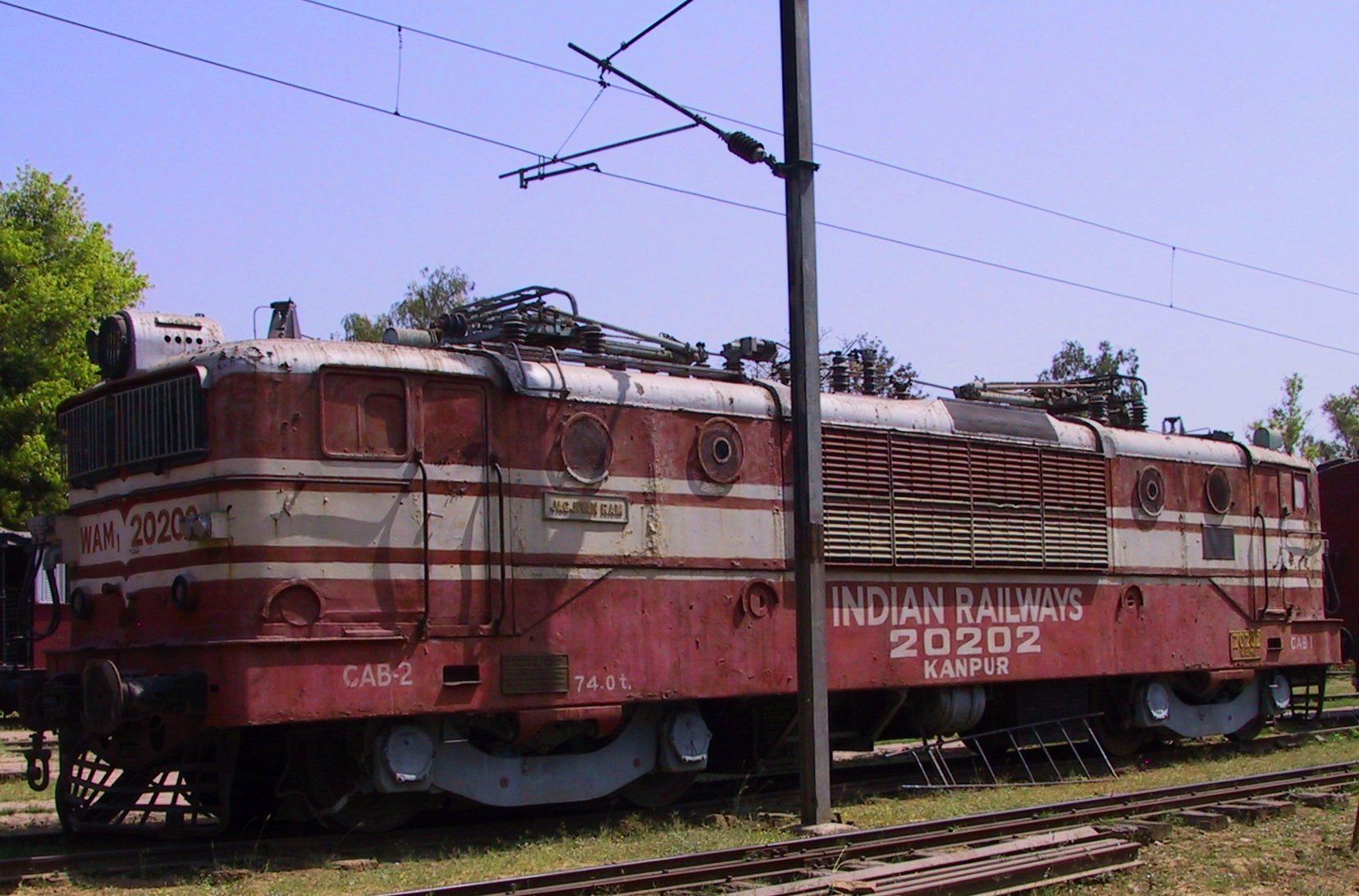
Type and origin
- Power type: Electric
- Builder: Kraus-Maffei, Krupp, SFAC, La Brugeoise & Nivelle (50 cycles European group)
- Build date: 1959–1961
- Total produced: 100
Specifications
- Configuration
  - AAR: B-B
  - UIC: B-B
- Gauge: 5 ft 6 in (1,676 mm)
- Bogies: Monomotor B-B bogies
- Wheel diameter: New: 1,140 mm (3 ft 9 in); Half worn: 1,120 mm (3 ft 8 in); Full worn: 1,064 mm (3 ft 6 in)
- Length: 14.600 m (47 ft 10 13/16 in)
- Width: 3.109 m (10 ft 2 13/32 in)
- Height: 4.165 m (13 ft 7 31/32 in)
- Axle load: 18,640 kg (41,090 lb)
- Loco weight: 74,000 kg (163,000 lb)
- Electric system/s: 25 kV 50 Hz AC Overhead
- Current pickup: pantograph
- Traction motors: Siemens/ACEC/Alstom MG 710A (740hp, 1250V, 480A, 1000 rpm, weight 2750kg). Fully suspended, force-ventilated.
- Loco brake: Air
- Train brakes: vacuum train brakes.
Performance figures
- Maximum speed: 112 km/h (70 mph)
- Power output: Maximum: 3,010 hp (2,240 kW); Continuous: 2,870 hp (2,140 kW)
- Tractive effort: Starting : 25,000 kgf (250 kN; 55,000 lbf)
Career
- Operators: Indian Railways
- Numbers: 20200-20299
- Locale: All over India
- Last run: late 1990s
- Withdrawn: 1999
- Preserved: 1
- Scrapped: early 1990s-2000s
- Disposition: Withdrawn from service and all except one scrapped

The Indian locomotive class WAM-1 was a class of 25 kV AC electric locomotives that was developed in the late 1950s by the Groupement 50 Hz (a consortium of European locomotive manufacturers) for Indian Railways. The model name stands for broad gauge (W), AC Current (A), Mixed traffic (M) locomotive, 1st generation (1). They entered service in 1960, thus making them the first AC electric locomotives to be in service in India. A total of 100 WAM-1s were built by the European consortium between 1959 and 1961, which made them the most numerous class of mainline electric locomotive until the WAG-1.

The WAM-1 served both passenger and freight trains for over 40 years. This class, though initially not a great success, provided the basic design for the WAM-4, which a number of other locomotives are based upon. However, with the advent of new 3-phase locomotives like the WAP-5 and WAP-7, the aging fleet of WAM-1 locomotives were relegated to freight and shunting duties, with all of them eventually being withdrawn from service. The single surviving unit named 'Jagjivan Ram' has been preserved at the Kolkata Rail Museum in Howrah.

== Locomotive shed ==
- All locomotives of this class have been withdrawn from service and all except one being scrapped.

== See also ==
- Rail transport in India § History
- Indian Railways
- Locomotives of India
- Rail transport in India
