= Indian locomotive class WAP-6 =

Class of 25 kV AC electric locomotives

WAP-6
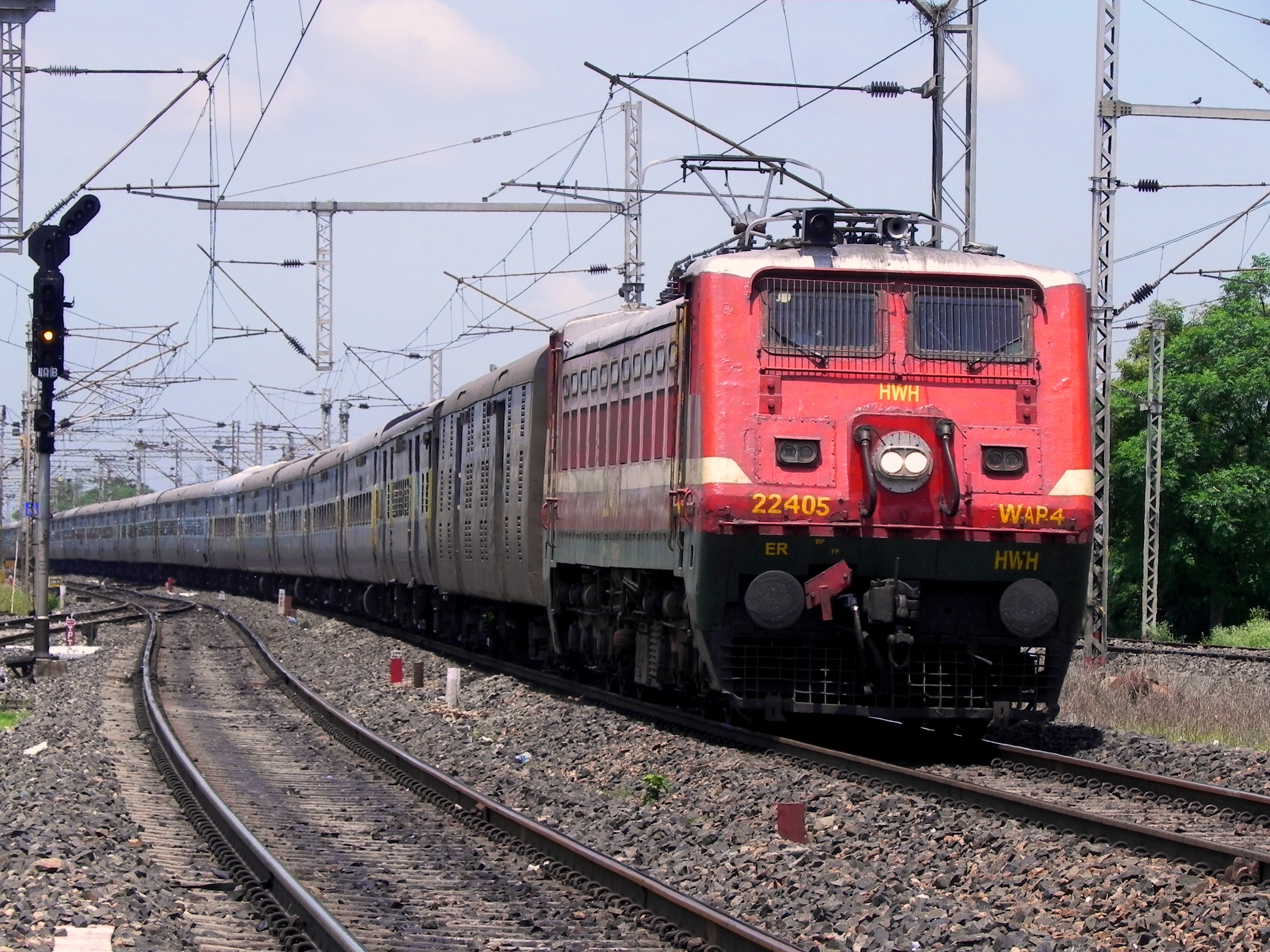
- A former WAP-6 hauling Kaziranga Express
Type and origin
- Power type: Electric
- Builder: CLW
- Build date: 1995–1998
- Total produced: 17
- Rebuild date: August 2012
Specifications
- Configuration
  - UIC: Co'-Co'
- Gauge: 1,676 mm (5 ft 6 in)
- Bogies: originally Flexicoil Mark IV Fabricated; converted to Co'-Co' Flexicoil Mark 1 cast bogies; primary and secondary wheel springs with bolsters
- Wheel diameter: New: 1,092 mm (3 ft 7 in); Half worn: 1,055 mm (3 ft 5 1/2 in); Full worn: 1,016 mm (3 ft 4 in)
- Length: 18.79 m (61 ft 7 3/4 in)
- Height: 4.235 m (13 ft 10 3/4 in)
- Axle load: 18,800 kg (41,400 lb)
- Loco weight: 113,200 kg (249,600 lb)
- Electric system/s: 25 kV 50 Hz AC Overhead
- Current pickup: Pantograph
- Traction motors: Hitachi HS15250
- Loco brake: Air/Hand
- Train brakes: Air
- Safety systems: Slip control, Over voltage relay and No volt relay
Performance figures
- Maximum speed: Designed: 160 km/h (99 mph); Restricted: 105 km/h (65 mph)
- Power output: Max: 5,350 hp (3,990 kW); Continuous: 5,000 hp (3,700 kW)
- Tractive effort: Starting: 30.8 t (30 long tons; 34 short tons); Continuous: 19 t (19 long tons; 21 short tons)
Career
- Operators: Indian Railways
- Numbers: 22400-22416
- Locale: Eastern Railway
- Withdrawn: August 2012
- Disposition: One scrapped, remainder rebuilt to WAP-4

The Indian locomotive class WAP-6 was a class of 25 kV AC electric locomotives that was developed in the mid-1990s by Chittaranjan Locomotive Works for Indian Railways. The model name stands for broad gauge (W), AC Current (A), Passenger traffic (P) locomotive, 6th generation (6). They entered service in April 1996. A total of 17 WAP-6 units were built at CLW between 1995 and 1998.

The WAP-6 were intended to be a higher-speed variant of the WAP-4, but were restricted to a top speed of 105 km/h after failing trials. All were based at Asansol (ASN) shed, but after conversion to WAP-4 specifications, they were reallocated to Howrah (HWH) shed.

== History ==
This class was a regeared variant of the WAP-4 mounted on Fabricated Flexicoil Mark IV bogies, instead of the standard Co-Co Flexicoil Mark 1 cast bogies seen on other WAP-4 locomotives. All other specifications were same as WAP-4. WAP-1 no.22212 was the first to be rebuilt into a WAP-6, being fitted with Flexicoil bogies and other upgrades; it was later rebuilt into a WAP-4. Subsequently, 16 more WAP-1 units were re-geared and mounted on Flexicoil Mark IV high-adhesion bogies, which are similar to high-adhesion bogies made by ALCO. Renumbered to 22400–22416, they were intended for 160 km/h (99 mph) operations, but in trials, they were unable to reach that speed and were therefore restricted to 105 km/h (65 mph). Two units, 22406 and 22408, were upgraded with better wheel-sets. This class was unsuccessful, with most locomotives of this series being converted back as WAP-4.

== Technical specifications ==
Technical specification
Traction motors	Axle-hung, nose-suspended, force-ventilated, 3,485 kg (7,683 lb), 630 kW (840 hp), 750 V, 900 A, 895 RPM, parallel grouping, C class armature and field, temperature rise (Armature 60, filed 70 and commutator 85) in °C, coil resistance (armature 0.01284 ohms+10%, field 0.01184 ohms+10% and commutator 0.00907 ohms+10%, air gap main pole 6.35 kVA, air gap inter-pole 10 mm (0.3937 in)
Gear ratio	58:23
Transformer	CCL make, aluminium coil, 3400 kVA, 32 taps
Rectifier	2 silicon rectifier cubicle 2700 A, 1050 V
Number of sandboxes	4
2 Headlights	250 W, 32 V
Lead acid Battery	50 cells, 110 V (rated 5 hr)
Arno Converter	216 kVA
2 FLAKT smoothing reactor blower	PHMX-40
2 Silicon Rectifier Blower	60 kg (132 lb)
Oil cooler blower	S.F. India Ltd.
Smoothing reactor for traction motor	SL-30 type, 1350 A, 1270 V, 2 Coils, 0.00535 ohms resistance at 110 °C (230 °F)

== Hauling capacity ==
If the average weight of ICF coaches is 55 tonnes then:

Grades/km/h	Start	20	40	60	70	80	90	100	110	120	130	140	150	160
Level	1500+	1500+	1500+	1500+	1500+	1500+	1500+	1500+	1500+	1500+	1500+	1155	805	570
1 in 500	1500+	1500+	1500+	1500+	1500+	1500+	1500+	1500+	1500+	1500+	1105	805	565	400
1 in 200	1500+	1500+	1500+	1500+	1500+	1500+	1500+	1320	1230	1035	730	535	375	260
1 in 150	1500+	1500+	1500+	1500+	1500+	1500+	1405	1090	1020	860	610	445	310	215
1 in 100	1500+	1570	1490	1405	1365	1195	1020	795	750	635	445	320	220	145
1 in 50	1160	770	750	720	710	625	530	410	390	325	220	150	90	45

== See also ==
- Indian Railways
- Locomotives of India
- Rail transport in India
