= Indian locomotive class WAG-1 =

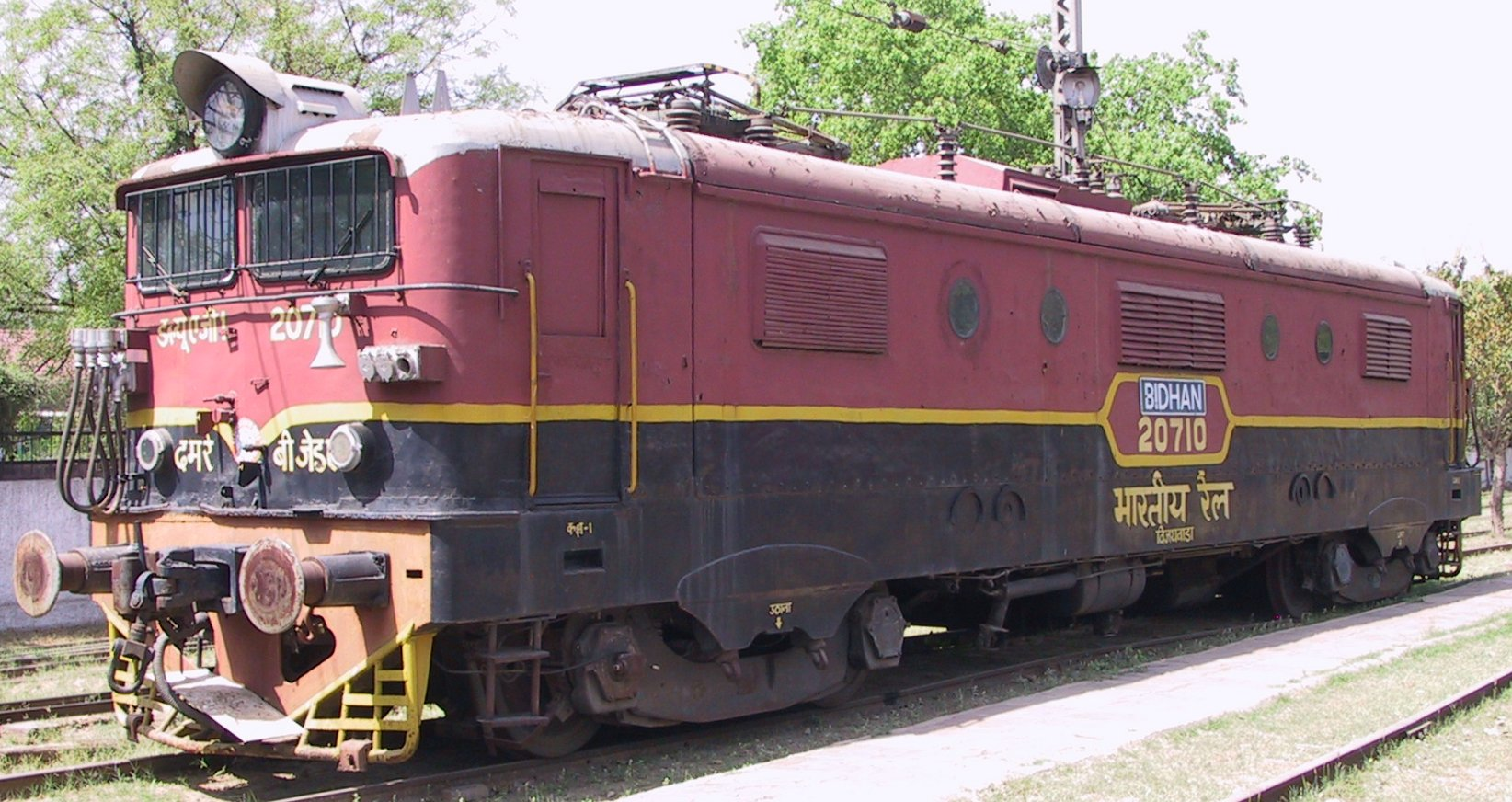
- WAG-1 20710 Bidhan at NRM
Type and origin
- Power type: Electric
- Builder: Kraus-Maffei, Krupp, SFAC, La Brugeoise & Nivelle (50 cycles European group)
- Build date: 1963–1966
- Total produced: 112
Specifications
- Configuration
  - AAR: B-B
  - UIC: B-B
- Gauge: 5 ft 6 in (1,676 mm)
- Bogies: Monomotor B-B bogies
- Wheel diameter: New: 1,140 mm (3 ft 9 in); Half worn: 1,120 mm (3 ft 8 in); Full worn: 1,064 mm (3 ft 6 in)
- Length: 14.600 m (47 ft 10 13/16 in)
- Width: 3.109 m (10 ft 2 13/32 in)
- Height: 4.165 m (13 ft 7 31/32 in)
- Axle load: 18,640 kg (41,090 lb)
- Loco weight: 74,000 kg (163,000 lb)
- Electric system/s: 25 kV 50 Hz AC AC Overhead
- Current pickup(s): Pantograph
- Traction motors: Siemens/ACEC/Alstom MG 710A (740hp, 1250V, 480A, 1000 rpm).Fully suspended, force-ventilated.
- Loco brake: Air
- Train brakes: Vacuum
Performance figures
- Maximum speed: 112 km/h (70 mph)
- Power output: 2,930 hp (2,185 kW)
- Tractive effort
  - Starting: 25,000 kgf (250 kN; 55,000 lbf)
Career
- Operators: Indian Railways
- Numbers: 20700-20709 (Niv. / SFAC) 20710-20791 (CLW) 20849-20868 (Niv. / SFAC)
- Locale: All over India
- Disposition: One preserved, remainder scrapped

The Indian locomotive class WAG-1 was a class of 25 kV AC electric locomotives that was imported from Europe in the 1960s for Indian Railways. The model name stands for broad gauge (W), AC Current (A), Goods traffic (G) locomotive, 1st generation (1). A total of 112 WAG-1 were built by The European Group 50 Hz Group/European Group/50 Cycles Group (consortium) between 1963 and 1966. They entered service in 1964.

The WAG-1 served both passenger and freight trains for nearly forty years. As of January 2002, all locomotives have been withdrawn from service, with one being preserved at the National Rail Museum and the remainder being scrapped.

== History ==
Forty-two locomotives of this type were ordered from European Group. Five of these were completely assembled in Europe and the remaining were built at CLW. A repeat order was placed on for 20 locomotives in 1963. Further these locomotives were manufactured at CLW. The typical feature of these locomotive is the Monomotor bogies. This construction results in substantial saving in weight in traction equipment and gives better adhesion. The traction motors are force ventilated and are fully suspended type. These motors are permanently grouped in parallel and are controlled by tap changer and field weakening. This can be used for a multiple unit operation to a maximum of four locomotives. Compressed air brake for the loco and vacuum brake for the train are provided, in addition, these locomotives have been provided with regenerative braking. Few locomotives have been converted to dual brake system. They were in service until 2002 when all but one were scrapped. The first indigenously CLW produced WAG-1 20710 'Bidhan' is preserved at the National Rail Museum, New Delhi.

Variants

- WAG-1S

== Specification ==
- Build dates: 1963-66
- Wheel arrangement: B-B ( monomotor bogies )
- Traction motors: AEC/Alstom/Siemens MG1420. Two motors (monomotor bogies), force-ventilated, fully suspended.
- Gear ratio: 3.95:1
- Transformer: MFO, type BOT 3150. 22.5 kV / 3000 kVA. 32 taps.
- Rectifiers: Secheron A268 Excitrons (four). 510 A / 1250 V.
- Axle load: 21.3 t
- Max. Haulage: 1820 t
- Pantographs: Two Faiveley AM-12

== Locomotive shed ==
- All locomotives of this class had been withdrawn from service as of 2002

== See also ==
- Rail transport in India § History
- Indian Railways
- Locomotives of India
- Rail transport in India
