= Indian locomotive class WAG-4 =

Indian railways freight class electric locomotive

WAG-4
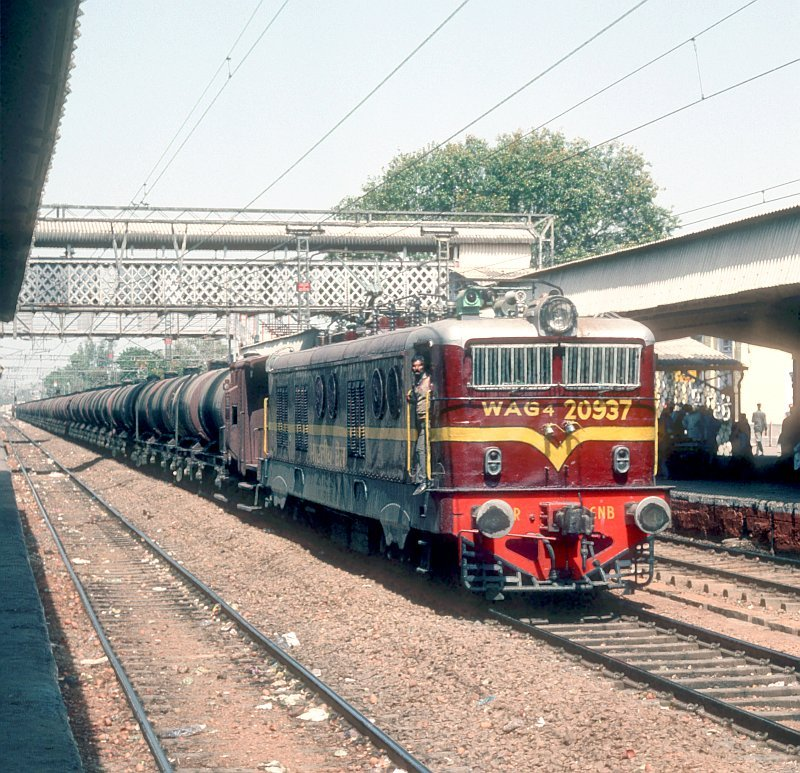
- WAG-4 20937 at Mathura Junction railway station
Type and origin
- Power type: Electric
- Builder: CLW
- Build date: 1967–1969
- Total produced: 186
Specifications
- Configuration
  - AAR: B-B
  - UIC: B-B
- Gauge: 5 ft 6 in (1,676 mm)
- Bogies: Monomotor B-B bogies
- Wheel diameter: New: 1,140 mm (3 ft 9 in); Half worn: 1,120 mm (3 ft 8 in); Full worn: 1,064 mm (3 ft 6 in)
- Length: 14.600 m (47 ft 10 13/16 in)
- Width: 3.109 m (10 ft 2 13/32 in)
- Height: 4.165 m (13 ft 7 31/32 in)
- Axle load: 18,640 kg (41,090 lb)
- Loco weight: 74,000 kg (163,000 lb)
- Electric system/s: 25 kV 50 Hz AC Overhead
- Current pickup: Pantograph
- Traction motors: Siemens/ACEC/Alstom MG 710A (740hp, 1250V, 480A, 1000 rpm). Fully suspended, force-ventilated.
- Loco brake: Air
- Train brakes: Vacuum
Performance figures
- Maximum speed: 112 km/h (70 mph)
- Power output: 2,930 hp (2,185 kW)
- Tractive effort
  - Starting: 25,000 kgf (250 kN; 55,000 lbf)
Career
- Operators: Indian Railways
- Numbers: 20700-20709 (Niv. / SFAC) 20710-20791 (CLW) 20849-20868 (Niv. / SFAC)
- Locale: All over India
- Disposition: Withdrawn from service and all except one scrapped

The Indian locomotive class WAG-4 is a class of 25 kV AC electric locomotives that was manufactured by CLW in the late 1960s for Indian Railways. The model name stands for broad gauge (W), AC Current (A), Goods traffic (G) engine, 1st (1). A total of 186 WAG-4 locomotives were built by The European Group 50 Hz Group/European Group/50 Cycles Group (consortium) between 1967 and 1969. They entered service in 1967.

The WAG-4 served both passenger and freight trains for over 40 years. As of January 2020, after removal from service, all but one were scrapped.

== History ==
The first fifty-six locomotive's equipment were procured from European Group. They had Auxiliary machines and some control equipments have been procured from indigenous sources. All these locomotives were built by CLW. The typical feature of these locomotives is Monomotor Bogie. This construction results in substantial saving in weight in traction equipment and gives better adhesion. These locomotives utilise silicon rectifiers for conversion of ac power into dc. The traction motors are force ventilated and are fully suspended type. These motors are permanently grouped in parallel and speed control is obtained through HT tap changer and TM field weakening.

These locomotives can be used for a multiple unit operation to a maximum of four locomotives with compressed air brake for the loco and vacuum brake for the train are provided. In addition, these locomotives are also provided with rheostatic braking. Few locomotives have been converted to dual brake system later on by Railways.

== Specification ==
- Build dates: 1966-71
- Wheel arrangement: B-B ( monomotor bogies like WAG-1)
- Traction Motors: ACEC make, MG 1580 A1 (1160 kW, 1270 V, 1040 A, 690 rpm, weight 5850 kg). Fully suspended, bogie-mounted.
- Gear Ratio: 3.95 : 1
- Transformer: Oerlikon BOT 3460. 32 taps.
- Rectifiers: Two GL 82220 silicon rectifiers, 1000 A / 1270 kW/1270 V. Weight 650 kg each.
- Axle Load: 21.9 t
- Hauling capacity: 2000 tons

Manufacturer: Chittaranjan Locomotive Works ( CLW )

Variants

- WAG-4D (D stands for Dual braking ie it can haul both vacuum and air brake stock wagons)

== Locomotive shed ==
- All the locomotives of this class has been withdrawn from service.

== See also ==
- Rail transport in India § History
- Indian Railways
- Locomotives of India
- Rail transport in India
