= Indian locomotive class YDM-3 =

Type and origin
- Power type: Diesel
- Builder: GM
- Order number: 61/RSF/459/1
- Serial number: DL.142.A.60
- Model: GA12
- Build date: 1961–1962
- Total produced: 30
Specifications
- Configuration
  - AAR: 1Bo+Bo1
  - UIC: 1'Bo'Bo'1
  - Commonwealth: 1Bo+Bo1
- Gauge: 1,000 mm (3 ft 3 3/8 in) metre gauge
- Wheel diameter: 865 mm (34.06 in)
- Length
  - Over couplers: 13.79 m (45 ft 2 7/8 in)
  - Over body: 12.35 m (40 ft 6 1/4 in)
- Width: 2,670 mm (8 ft 9 1/8 in)
- Height: 3,365 mm (11 ft 1/2 in)
- Axle load: 11,000 kg (24,000 lb)
- Loco weight: 58,500 kg (129,000 lb)
- Fuel type: Diesel
- Fuel capacity: 3,028 L (666 imp gal; 800 US gal)
- Lubricant cap.: 625 L (137 imp gal; 165 US gal)
- Coolant cap.: 907 L (200 imp gal; 240 US gal)
- Sandbox cap.: 0.34 L (0.075 imp gal; 0.090 US gal)
- Power supply: 110 V DC supply
- Prime mover: GM 12-567C
- RPM range: 275-800
  - RPM low idle: 275
  - RPM idle: 275
  - Maximum RPM: 800
- Aspiration: Turbo-supercharged
- Generator: EMD D25
- Traction motors: 2 EMD D69MC
  - Rating 1 hour: 835 Amp
  - Continuous: 800 A
- Head end power: 110 V DC
- Cylinders: 12
- Cylinder size: 216 mm × 254 mm (8.50 in × 10.00 in) bore x stroke
- Transmission: Diesel–electric transmission
- Gear ratio: 4.598:1
- MU working: 2
- Loco brake: Air brake
- Train brakes: Vacuum brake
- Compressor: 109.5 L (24.1 imp gal; 28.9 US gal)
- Exhauster: 439 L (97 imp gal; 116 US gal)
Performance figures
- Maximum speed: 80 km/h (50 mph)
- Power output
  - Starting: 1,390 hp (1,040 kW)
  - Continuous: 1,240 hp (920 kW)
- Tractive effort
  - Starting: 14.300 t (14 long tons; 16 short tons)
  - Continuous: 11.25 t (11 long tons; 12 short tons)
Career
- Operators: Indian Railways
- Numbers: 6050-6079
- Official name: nil
- Locale: Western Railway zone
- Delivered: 1961
- First run: 1962
- Last run: February 1998
- Withdrawn: February 1998
- Preserved: 2 (6073, 6074)
- Scrapped: 1999
- Disposition: All except 2 units have been scrapped

The Indian locomotive class YDM-3 is a class of diesel–electric locomotive that was developed in 1964 by GM-EMD for Indian Railways. The model name stands for Metre gauge (Y), Diesel (D), Mixed traffic (M) engine, 3rd generation (3). They entered service in 1962. A total of 30 YDM-3 locomotives was built between 1961 and 1962.

The YDM-3 served both passenger and freight trains for over 35 years. As of January 2020, all 30 locomotives have been withdrawn from service with two locomotives being preserved.

== History ==
The history of YDM-3 begins in the early 1960s with the stated aim of the Indian Railways to remove steam locomotives from Indian rails after recommendation of Karnail Singh Fuel Committee. Therefore, required building a large number of Meter gauge diesel locomotives. Thus Indian Railways began looking at various diesel–electric designs. EMD gave them the model number GA12.

Meter gauge, though rare gauge today, used to be a dominant gauge that time. After the introduction of YDM-1 locomotives by North British, Indian Railway thought for more powerful ones and hence EMD and the American Locomotive Company (ALCO) submitted designs of YDM-3/YDM-5 (12-567C) and YDM-4 respectively for new diesel locomotives. Each company supplied their locomotives in 1961. So about twenty five of these YDM-5 locomotives were ordered from General Motors, USA in the year 1963–64. While YDM-3 was 13 ton lighter than the YDM-4, Indian Railways opted for the ALCO design.

The YDM-4 was considered over the YDM-3 model because of these reasons.

- EMD would not consider transfer of technology at the time while ALCO accepted. This allowed YDM-4 locomotives to be manufactured in India.
- The EMD locomotives were able to generate only half as much continuous tractive effort than their ALCO counterpart.
- The ALCO YDM-4 had the more heavier axle load.
- YDM-4 cab provided better view in long hood forward operation over the YDM-3 models which had cab at one end.
- Maximum speed on YDM-5 locomotives was only 80kmph compared to 100kmph for YDM-4.
- YDM-4 with its simpler electrics were easier to maintain.

These locomotives are designed for mixed traffic operation. The initial fleet of YDM-3 locomotives were allocated and homed at the diesel locomotive shed in Siliguri and were tested extensively on the Northeast Frontier Railway zone (NFR). Then the entire YDM-3 fleet was transferred to Sabarmati sometime after 1963. Sabarmati serving the present day Western Railway zone. They hauled passenger trains like Girnar Express, Pink City express, Ashram express. The YDM-3 locomotives had an unusual arrangement for the traction motors. These were mounted longitudinally on the mainframe and drove the wheel-sets through cardan shafts. This required a lot of maintenance, possibly more than the axle-hung motors of the YDM-4 types. But In cab-forward mode, the YDM-3 locomotives offered an excellent view, and the cabin was more spacious than the YDM-4.

By the late 1990s the locomotives were had been withdrawn from service, all because of spare parts becoming difficult to source and work for the class declining due to conversion of meter gauge to broad gauge. These locomotives were withdrawn as life-expired in February 1996, and the remainder of the batch that had not recently been overhauled followed in the next two years. All 30 were withdrawn.

== Preserved Locomotives ==
Out of the 25 units built, only one locomotive has been preserved in front of BLW GM office.

| Class | Manufacturer | Loco Number | Previous shed | Name | Livery | Location | ref |
|---|---|---|---|---|---|---|---|
| YDM-3 | GM-EMD | 6073 | Sabarmati(SBI) | | Maroon with yellow band & stripe | Plinthed at DLW, Varanasi | |
| YDM-3 | GM-EMD | 6074 | Sabarmati(SBI) | | Maroon with yellow band & stripe | Plinthed in front of DLW GM Office | |

== Former sheds ==
- Silliguri (SGUJ)
- Sabarmati (SBI)
- All the locomotives of this class has been withdrawn from service.

== Technical specifications ==
| Manufacturers | GM-EMD |
| Engine | They are powered by a single 12-cylinders, 2-stroke EMD 567C type diesel engine capable of developing 1390 hp at 800 RPM under SAE standard conditions. |
| Transmission | The locomotives are equipped with Electric Transmission consisting of one EMD make D-25 Direct Current main generator and two EMU make D 69 MC direct current |
| Traction motors | The traction motors are series-wound, underframe mounted traction motors and are forced ventilated. The final drive is through reduction gear with universal joint drive shafts. |
| Brakes | Compressed air and Rheostatic brake system is provided for the locomotive and vacuum brake equipment is installed for the train braking. |
| Engine Cooling | Engine cooling arrangement consists of Street drive centrifugal water pump on the engine with the radiator and cooling ran located at the governor end of engine. Automatic water temp. control is provided through thermostatically controlled modulating type by-pass valve. |
| Axle load | 11.0 t (10.8 long tons; 12.1 short tons) |
| total weight | 58.5 t (57.6 long tons; 64.5 short tons) |
| Bogies | GM Fexicoil Bogies |
| Starting TE | 14.300 t (14.074 long tons; 15.763 short tons) |
| Continuous TE | 11.25 t (11.07 long tons; 12.40 short tons) |

== See also ==
- Indian locomotive class YDM-5
- Indian locomotive class WDM-4
- Locomotives of India
- Rail transport in India#History
