= Diesel Loco Shed, Sabarmati =

Loco shed in Gujarat, India

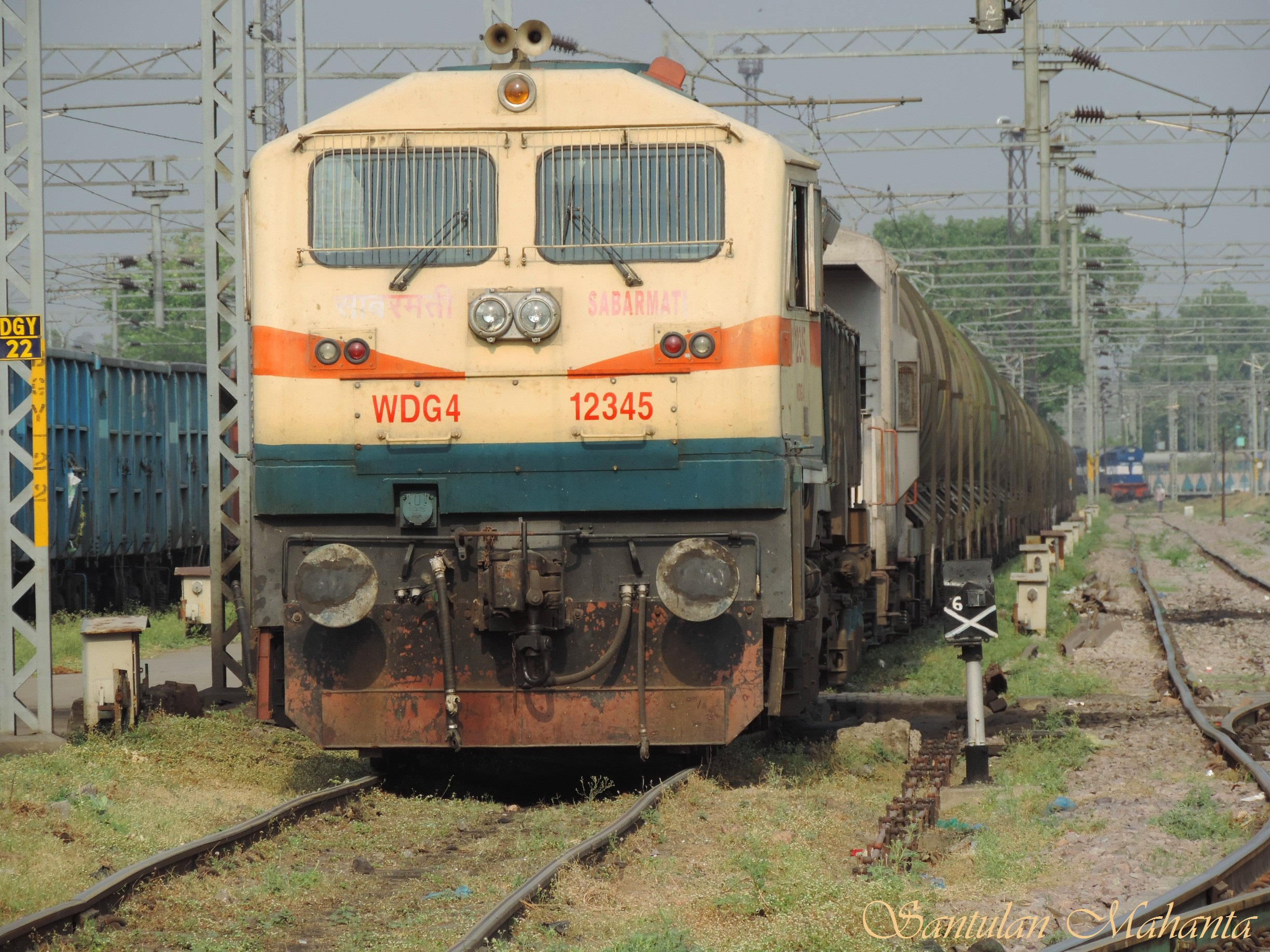
- Sabarmati based WDG-4 at Lucknow yard.

- Location within Gujarat

Location
- Location: Sabarmati, Ahmedabad, Gujarat
- Coordinates: 23°04′17″N 72°35′14″E

Characteristics
- Owner: Indian Railways
- Operator: Western Railway zone
- Depot code: SBT
- Type: Engine shed
- Rolling stock: YDM-4; WDG-4/WDG-4D; WDG-5; WDP-4/WDP-4D; WDG-3A; WDM-3A; WDM-3D; WAG-9; WAG-12; WAP-7

History
- Opened: 8 June 1978; 48 years ago

Diesel Loco Shed, Sabarmati is a locomotive maintenance shed located in Sabarmati, Ahmedabad, Gujarat in India. It is located east of Sabarmati falling under Ahmedabad railway division. The shed caters to the needs of freight as well as passenger trains.

It is one of three diesel loco sheds in the Western Railway zone, the others are Ratlam and Vatva . One of the last remaining major MG loco sheds.

== History ==
It was established on 8 July 1978 with a holding capacity of 55 YDM-3 and YDM-5 locomotives, but 50 WDG4 where added to the Loco Shed in 2008 and it was fully operational in 2009. The first EMD loco no. 12224 WDG4 arrived at Sabarmati shed in July 2009. All locos received by the shed are from Banaras Locomotive Works, Varanasi, India.

The shed currently holds around 50 EMD BG Locos and 150 MG Locos. It has 45 YDM-4/4A locos locomotives out of which 27 MG locos in passenger services and giving inferior service.

The shed too holds the Only 7 WDG-5 (EMD GT50AC) locomotives that have been made by Banaras Locomotive Works (BLW).

Nine YDM-4 locos from here have been sold to Togorail and shipped to Togo.

This shed has been recently allotted WAG12 Locomotive in April 2025 and Hold 300 locomotives, making it the 3rd Shed in the entire IR Network after Saharanpur(MELS), Ajni(NEDA).

Major and minor schedules of Diesel Locomotives are carried out in the shed. The shed is ISO: ISO 9002:2001, ISO 14001, ISO 9001:2008 certified.

== Locomotives ==
Serial No.	Locomotive Class	Horsepower	Quantity
1.	WDP-4/4D	4000-4500	22
2.	WDG-4/4D	4000-4500	35
3.	WDG-5	5500	7
4.	YDM-4	1400	11
5.	WDG-3A	3100	22
6.	WDM-3D	3300	20
7.	WAG-9	6120	34
8.	WAG-12	12000	170
9.	WAP-7	6350	9
Total Locomotives Active as of November 2026			330

== See also ==
- Diesel Loco Shed, Mhow
- Diesel Loco Shed, Vatva
- Diesel Loco Shed, Ratlam
- Electric Loco Shed, Vadodara
- Electric Loco Shed, Valsad
