= Indian locomotive class YDM-4 =

Indian Railways class diesel–electric locomotive

YDM-4
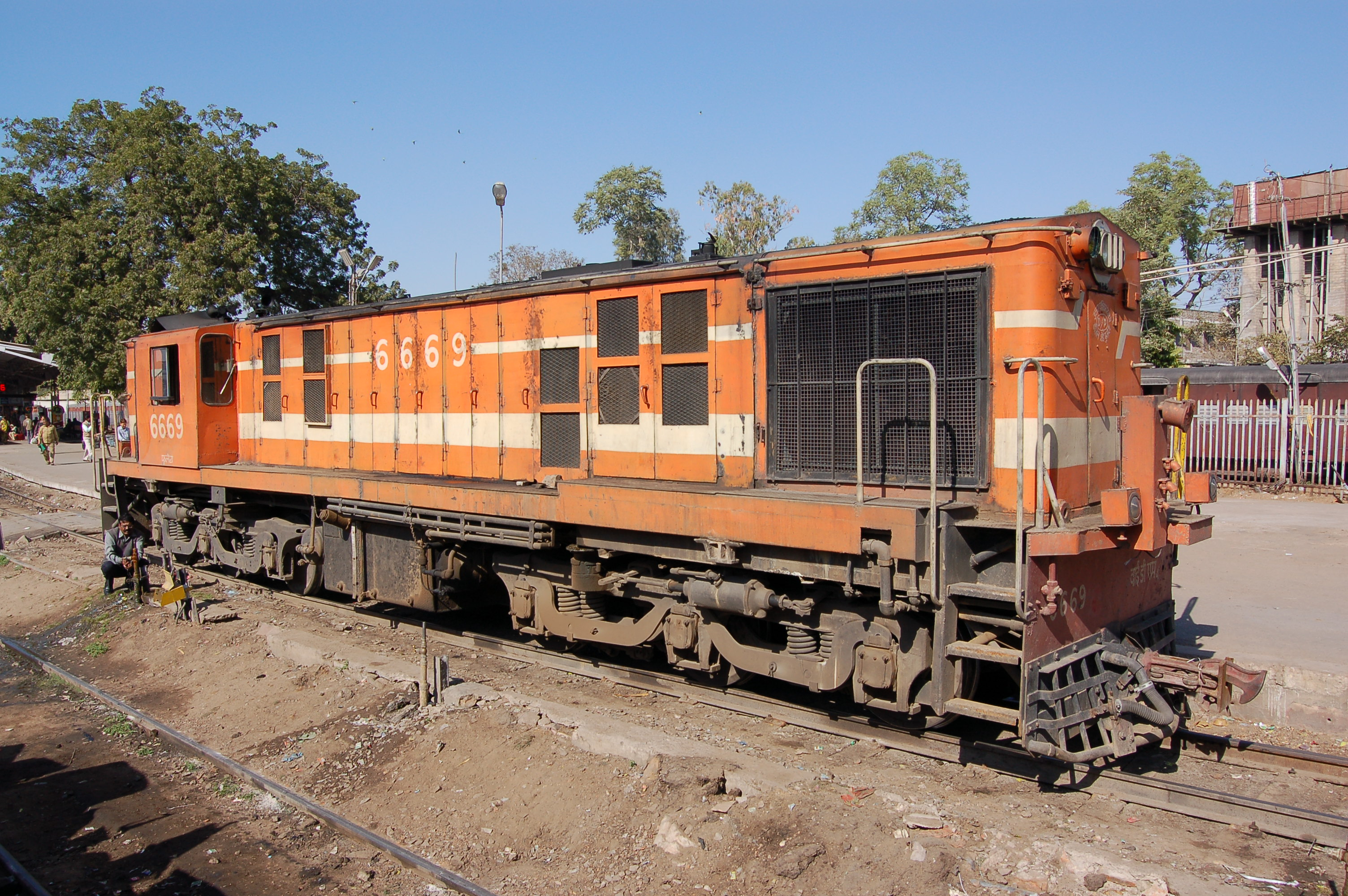
- Phulera based YDM-4 at Jaipur Jn.
Type and origin
- Power type: Diesel
- Builder: Alco, MLW, BLW
- Model: DL535, DL535A, RSD-30, D13E.
- Build date: 1961–1993
- Total produced: YDM-4: 695
Specifications
- Configuration
  - UIC: Co-Co
- Gauge: 1,000 mm (3 ft 3 3/8 in) metre gauge
- Bogies: ALCO Asymmetric cast frame trimount
- Wheel diameter: 965 mm (37.99 in)
- Length: 15.60 m (51 ft 2 1/8 in)
- Width: 2,730 mm (8 ft 11 1/2 in)
- Height: 3,635 mm (11 ft 11 1/8 in)
- Axle load: 12,000 kg (26,000 lb)
- Loco weight: 72,000 kg (159,000 lb) ALCo/DLW, 67,000 kg (148,000 lb) MLW
- Fuel type: Diesel
- Fuel capacity: 3,000 L (660 imp gal; 790 US gal)
- Lubricant cap.: 530 L (120 imp gal; 140 US gal), 630 L (140 imp gal; 170 US gal) DLW
- Water cap.: 22 L (4.8 imp gal; 5.8 US gal), 28 L (6.2 imp gal; 7.4 US gal) DLW
- Prime mover: ALCO 251-D
- RPM range: 400-1100
- Engine type: Inline-6 diesel
- Aspiration: Turbo-supercharged
- Displacement: (?)
- Generator: DC
- Traction motors: 6 DC
- Cylinders: 6
- Cylinder size: 228 mm × 267 mm (8.98 in × 10.51 in) bore x stroke
- Transmission: Diesel–electric transmission
- MU working: 2
- Loco brake: 28LV-1, Air brake for Locomotive using SA-9 brake handle
- Train brakes: Originally Vacuum using A-9 brake handle, some modified to Dual
Performance figures
- Maximum speed: 96 km/h (60 mph)
- Power output: Max: 1,400 hp (1,000 kW); Site rated: 1,300 hp (970 kW)
- Tractive effort: 18.935 t (19 long tons; 21 short tons) maximum 16.050 t (16 long tons; 18 short tons) continuous
Career
- Operators: Indian Railways, IRCON, KTMB Malaysia, Myanmar Railways, Vietnam Railways, Cambodian Railways, Mozambique Ports and Railways, Togorail
- Numbers: 6020-6049 ALCo, 6105-6129 ALCo, 6130-6198 MLW, 6199-6258 DLW, 6259-6288 MLW, 6289-6769 DLW
- Locale: All over Indian Railways; Leased to various operators (KTMB Malaysia, Myanmar Railway, Cambodian Railways); 25 units operated by Vietnam Railways
- Preserved: 3
- Current owner: Indian Railway, IRCON, KTMB Malaysia, Myanmar Railway, Vietnam Railways, Cambodian Railways
- Disposition: active

The YDM-4 is a class of diesel locomotives operating on Indian Railways. The first units were built by the American Locomotive Company (Alco) in 1961. Since 1968, members of the class have been manufactured in India by the Banaras Locomotive Works (BLW), Varanasi. The model name stands for metre gauge (Y), diesel (D), mixed traffic (M) engine. The YDM-4 has been the most successful metre gauge diesel locomotive in India. The YDM-4 locos have a maximum speed of 100 km/h (62 mph), restricted to 85 km/h (53 mph).

The YDM-4A is a variant of the YDM-4 that is supplied by MLW. Originally equipped with vacuum brakes, some were later equipped with dual brakes, particularly those working in the Northeast Frontier Railway.

== History ==
In the mid 1950s Indian Railways began introducing diesel locomotives to its metre gauge system. Metre gauge, though rare in the 21st century, used to be a dominant gauge at that time. After the introduction of YDM-1 locomotives by the North British Locomotive Company, Indian Railway considered more powerful ones and hence General Motors Electro-Motive Division (EMD) and the American Locomotive Company (ALCO) submitted designs of YDM-3/YDM-5 (12-567C) and YDM-4 respectively for new diesel locomotives. Each company supplied 30 locomotives in 1961. While the YDM-3 was 13 tons lighter than the YDM-4, Indian Railways opted for the ALCO design because of the heavier axle load and technology agreement that would allow these locomotives to be manufactured in India.

After Banaras Locomotive Works (BLW) completed construction of its factory in Varanasi, production of the class began in India. The initial 30 YDM-4 locomotives supplied by ALCO in 1961 were numbered between #6020 and #6049. Another batch of 8 locomotives soon followed and were numbered #6105 to #6112. YDM-4 #6113-6129 were built around 1964. Siliguri Diesel Locoshed was the first DLS to station YDM-4 locomotives in 1962. The very first YDM4, #6020, was allotted to the New Guwahati Diesel Loco Shed, which was an outbase of Siliguri DLS on 30 October 1962.

YDM4 #6130 to #6198 were built by Montreal Locomotive Works (MLW) in 1964 under the license of ALCO and were classified as YDM-4A. All the YDM-4 delivered up to then were presumably based at three premier DLS across India namely Siliguri (SGUJ), Ponmalai Goldenrock (GOC) and Sabarmati (SBI). Another batch of YDM-4A was dispatched from MLW in 1969, numbered #6259 to #6288.

The first YDM-4 built by Banaras Locomotive Works (BLW) Varanasi was #6199 Hubli. This loco entered service in 1968 and was dedicated to the then Deputy Prime Minister of India, Morarji Desai. DLW built locos in the range #6199 to #6258.

From 1969 till 1993 DLW produced YDM-4 locomotives for Indian Railways in the number range #6289 to #6769. The last YDM-4 was based at Rangapara North outbase of Siliguri DLS but later on transferred to Myanmar (Burma) Railways and possibly renumbered as DF1332.

== Locomotive sheds ==
Zone	Name	Shed Code	Quantity
North Eastern Railway	Izzatnagar	IZN	9
North Western Railway	Mavli	MVJ	6
Southern Railway	Ponmalai Goldenrock	GOC	5
Western Railway	Sabarmati	SBI	17
Western Railway	Mhow	MHOW	17
Total Locomotives active as June 2026			37

== Technical specifications ==
Manufacturers	Alco, MLW, DLW
Engine	Alco 251-D, Inline-6, 1,400 hp (1,000 kW) (1,300 hp or 970 kW site rating) with Alco turbocharged engine. 1,100 rpm max, 400 rpm idle; 228 mm × 267 mm (8.98 in × 10.51 in) bore x stroke; compression ratio 12.5:1.
Transmission	Electric, DC-DC (DC Generator and DC Traction motor)
Traction motors	GE for original Alco and MLW models, BHEL for DLW
Axle load	12.0 t (11.8 long tons; 13.2 short tons)
total weight	72.0 t (70.9 long tons; 79.4 short tons) ALCo and DLW, 67.0 t (65.9 long tons; 73.9 short tons) MLW
Bogies	Alco design cast frame trimount (Co-Co) bogies with asymmetrical arrangement of traction motors
Starting TE	18.94 t (18.64 long tons; 20.88 short tons)
Continuous TE	16.05 t (15.80 long tons; 17.69 short tons)
