= Indian locomotive class WDM-2 =

Broad gauge Indian diesel–electric locomotive

WDM-2
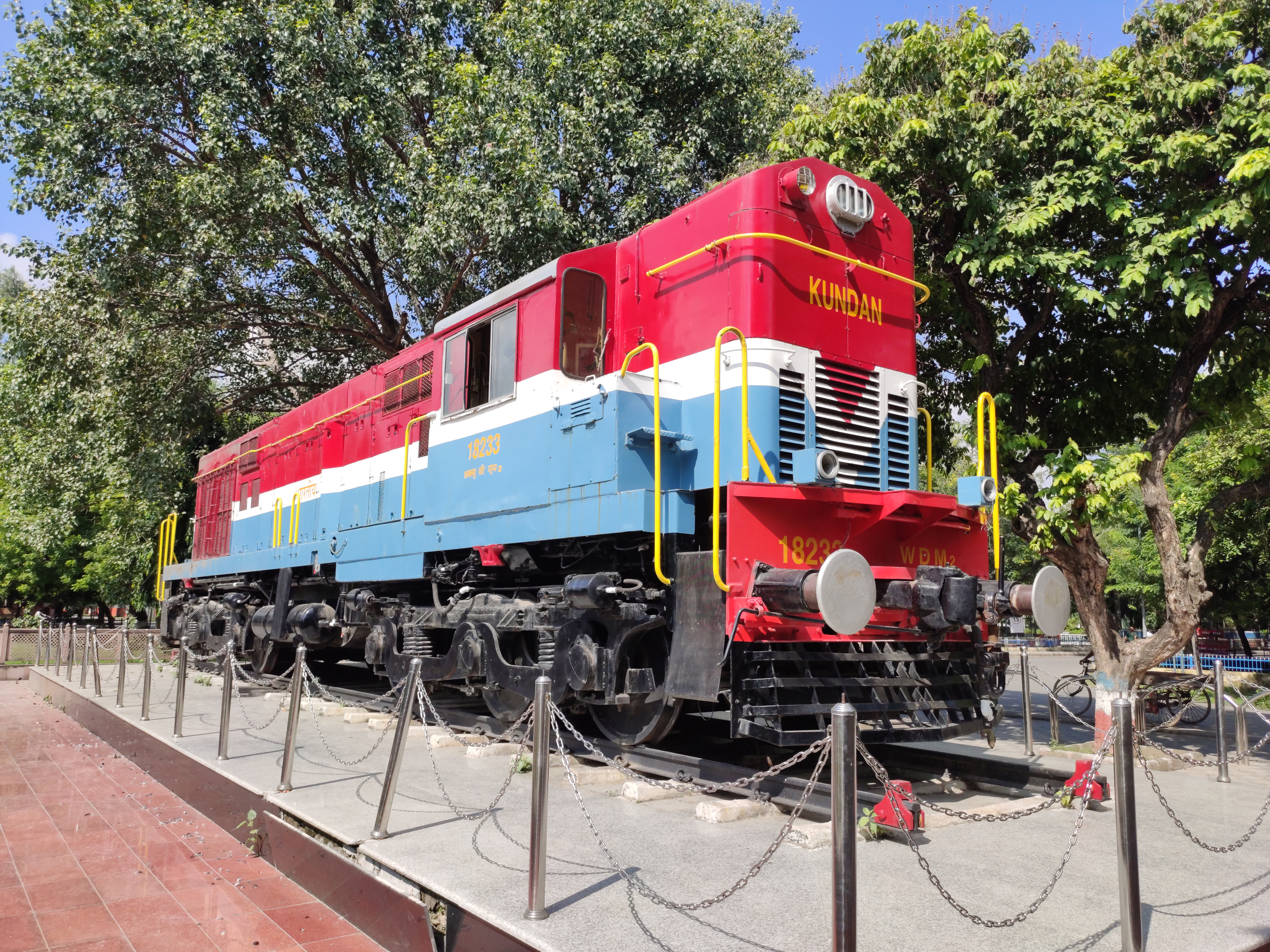
- A WDM-2 named KUNDAN at BLW, Varanasi.
Type and origin
- Power type: Diesel
- Builder: Alco, BLW
- Model: DL560C
- Build date: 1962–1998
- Total produced: WDM-2/A/B: 2,700
- Rebuilder: BLW, PLW [formerly DLMW]
- Number rebuilt: 1246
Specifications
- Configuration
  - UIC: Co′Co′
  - Commonwealth: Co-Co
- Gauge: 1,676 mm (5 ft 6 in)
- Bogies: ALCO Asymmetric cast frame trimount
- Wheel diameter: 1,092 mm (3 ft 7 in)
- Wheelbase: 12.834 m (42 ft 1 1/4 in)
- Length: 17.12 m (56 ft 2 in)
- Width: 2.864 m (9 ft 4 3/4 in)
- Height: 4.185 m (13 ft 8 3/4 in)
- Axle load: 18,800 kg (41,400 lb)
- Loco weight: 112,800 kg (248,700 lb)
- Fuel type: Diesel
- Fuel capacity: 5,000 L (1,100 imp gal; 1,300 US gal)
- Prime mover: ALCO 251-B
- RPM range: 400 - 1,000 rpm
- Engine type: V16 diesel
- Aspiration: Turbo-supercharged
- Generator: BHEL 10931 AZ
- Traction motors: GE752, BHEL 4906 BZ and 4907 AZ
- Cylinders: 16
- Cylinder size: 228 mm × 266 mm (8.98 in × 10.47 in) bore×stroke
- Transmission: Diesel–electric transmission
- MU working: 2
- Train brakes: Air, Vacuum and Dual
Performance figures
- Maximum speed: 120 km/h (75 mph)
- Power output: Max:2,600 hp (1,900 kW); Site rated:2,430 hp (1,810 kW)
- Tractive effort: 30.4 t (30 long tons; 34 short tons)
- Factor of adh.: 0.27
Career
- Operators: Indian Railways
- Numbers: 16000-16887, 17100-17999, 18040-18079, 18112-18514, 18523-18900, 18903-18999
- Nicknames: Jumbo, Prabal
- Locale: All over Indian Railways
- Delivered: 1962; 62 years ago
- First run: 1962; 62 years ago
- Retired: November 2023
- Withdrawn: 2023
- Preserved: 10
- Disposition: All withdrawn from indian railway service, 9 pure units preserved, few rebuilds[WDM-3A] preserved, few sold to non-railway operators, rest scrapped.

The Indian locomotive class WDM-2 was a class of diesel–electric locomotive that was developed in 1962 by American Locomotive Company (ALCO) for the Indian Railways. The model name stands for broad gauge (W), Diesel (D), Mixed traffic (M) engine, 2nd generation (2). They entered service in 1962. A total of more than 2,700 WDM-2 was built at ALCO and Banaras Locomotive Works (BLW or DLW, as it was formerly Diesel Locomotive Works), Varanasi between 1962 and 1998, which made them the most numerous class of mainline diesel locomotive until its successor the WDM-3A. Many of the WDM-2 locos were rebuilt into WDM-3A locos.

The WDM-2 is one of the most successful locomotives of Indian Railways serving both passenger and freight trains for over 60 years. A few WDM-2 units were exported to neighbouring countries like Sri Lanka and Bangladesh. Despite the introduction of more modern types of locomotives like WDG-4 and electrification, a significant number were still in use till 2023, both in mainline and departmental duties. As of November 2023, all WDM-2 units have been withdrawn from service, with further examples in service as WDM-3A or WDM-2S.

== Origin ==
The history of WDM-2 begins in the early 1960s with the stated aim of the Indian Railways to remove steam locomotives from Indian Rails after recommendation of Karnail Singh Fuel Committee. Therefore, required building a large number of Co-Co diesel locomotives producing at least 2,600 hp (1,900 kW) with road switcher cabs to achieve this aim. Thus Indian Railways began looking at various diesel–electric designs.

Initially, the Indian railways invited tenders to build locomotives to the new specification. The following responses were received:

- ALCO submitted their model (RSD29 / DL560C) with 2,600 hp, 16-cylinder, 4-stroke turbo-supercharged engine with Co-Co bogies.
- General Motors Electro-Motive Division (EMD) submitted their G16, turbocharged to become the GT16. They had Co-Co bogies with 16-cylinder 2-stroke turbo-supercharged engines.

Each company submitted their prototypes and Indian Railways designated these prototypes as the WDM-2 class and WDM-4 class respectively. Technologically the General Motors WDM-4 was superior to ALCO WDM-2, but Indian Railways required a transfer of technology agreement that would allow these locomotives to be indigenously manufactured in India. Since General Motors did not agree to the transfer of technology agreement, the ALCO prototype was selected for production.

However, even before the arrival of WDM-2, another type of diesel locomotive was imported from ALCO in 1957. This locomotive was classified as WDM-1. However WDM-1s were not selected for mass production because of having only one forward cab at one end which needed a lot of turntables.

=== Production history ===
The first few prototype WDM-2 locomotives were imported, with locomotive number 18040 being assigned the first WDM-2 of India. The need for a large number of locomotives quickly was deemed paramount. After Banaras Locomotive Works (DLW) completed construction of its factory in Varanasi, production of the locomotives began in India. The first 12 locomotives were built using kits imported from ALCO (order no. D3389) in the United States.

The first diesel loco assembled in DLW was locomotive number 18233 and the first fully built WDM-2 from DLW was 18299. After that DLW started manufacturing WDM-2 locomotives from their own components. Since then over 2,800 locomotives have been manufactured with 16887 being the last locomotive in the series.

Although ALCO went bankrupt, DLW Varanasi successfully adapted the technology and produced many upgraded versions which were exported to many Broad Gauge countries. Later a number of modifications were made and a few sub-classes were created. These include WDM-2A, WDM-2B and WDM-3A (formerly WDM-2C). A few WDM-2 locomotives had been rebuilt by Diesel Loco Modernisation Works (DLMW) in Patiala, Punjab. These are fitted with DBRs produced by Daulat Ram Engineering.

=== Service history ===
The whole batch of WDM-2 imports went all to the Diesel locomotive shed at Katni (KTE). Locomotive number 18040 was first loco in the series, but 18042 was the first WDM-2 unit to be commissioned. By 1967 the first express trains were being hauled by the WDM-2 instead of steam locomotives. Trains like the Himgiri express and Tamil Nadu express were hauled entirely by WDM-2 units. One of the most important express trains hauled by the WDM-2 class was the Mumbai Rajdhani express. By the 1980s the WDM-2 class was hauling most of the passenger and freight trains in India.

The WDM-2 locomotives have a maximum speed of 120 km/h (75 mph), restricted to 100 km/h (62 mph) when run long hood forward. The last 3 pure units are based at Abu Road.

=== Maintenance ===
The WDM-2 has a maintenance schedule of 3,000 km or 10 days, which was recommended by ALCO. These have been extended by 20 days to 30 days by using better and more efficient lubrication oils and other component fluids and improving some bearings for the suspension. The original WDM-2 bearings were very failure-prone and often required minor repairs. However the WDM-2 was very easy to operate and maintain because of its simple construction and mechanics which resulted in it being very reliable. This maintenance is usually done at the nearest Diesel loco shed.

== Variants ==
=== WDM-3A ===
The WDM-3A class is actually an upgraded WDM-2 designed to produce more power (3,100 hp instead of 2,600 hp) and increased reliability (roller bearings instead of conventional ALCO bearings). Except for 150 units, these are rebuilt WDM-2s. Rebuilt WDM-3As can be identified by an “R” at the end of their road number.

=== WDG-2/3A ===
It is the dedicated freighter version of the WDM-2 and shares the same engine and horsepower rating with WDM-3A.The first units of this class was delivered on 18 July 1995 under the model name of WDG-2. The class was manufactured till the end of 2015. All the older locomotives built by DLW had a regular WDM-2 type square short hood profile and control stand position. The Bogies of WDM-2 have been replaced by high adhesion fabricated bogies for better traction and stability.

They are hugely successful; around 1163 units of this class were produced. These can be found all over India performing various duties like hauling freight and passenger service to shunting and departmental works.

=== WDM-7 ===
They are lower powered (2,000 hp instead of 2,600 hp) version of the WDM-2. These locomotives were built from 1987 to 1989. A few were at Ernakulam, but all were transferred later to Tondiarpet. They can also be seen shunting at Chennai Central or used for light passenger haulage. Some are at the thermal power station, Chennai.

They were formerly housed at Erode and Golden Rock. They are reliable and rugged locomotives even though low powered. They can be easily recognised by the lack of grilles on the short hood. Two locomotives are running on a mixture of bio-diesel and diesel. All 15 are still in service.

=== WDP-1 ===
It is a lower powered passenger (2,300 hp) version of the WDM-2. The Bogies of WDM-2 have been replaced by Bo-Bo fabricated bogies with a max. speed of 140 km/h. They were not hugely successful. About 69 units have been produced with 60 locomotives still being in service. They are identifiable by their ‘baldie’ grille-less short hoods.

=== WDP-2/3A ===
It is a dedicated passenger version of the WDM-2/3A, similar to how the freighter WDG-2/3A was developed, but unlike its mixed-use and freight-dedicated counterparts, this locomotive features an aerodynamic streamlined dual-cab design, similar to its AC-electric counterparts, like the WAP-1 and WAP-4, making it the first dual-cab diesel–electric locomotive of India, preceding the EMD 710 based WDP-4D, and the Only dual-cab member of the ALCO DL560C family. Ever since the arrival of the imported EMD GT46PAC (WDP-4) locomotive in 2001, it too proved to be only merely successful over the WDP-1. This locomotive is known by the nickname "Toaster", as the second cab, which is too small and closely attached to the radiator of the locomotive, gets heated up and causes discomfort while driving.

== Sub-classes ==
=== WDM-2A ===
The WDM-2A is a variant of the original WDM-2 series that have been retro-fitted with air brakes, in addition to the original vacuum brakes. Thus, these locomotives can haul both vacuum- and air-braked wagons. Air brakes were introduced as they're safer and more reliable. Despite this classification some WDM-2A locomotives are still marked as WDM-2 rather than WDM-2A.

=== WDM-2B ===
The WDM-2B is a variant of the original WDM-2 series built with air brakes as original equipment. They do not have vacuum brakes. Only some have been classified as WDM-2B.

=== Jumbos ===
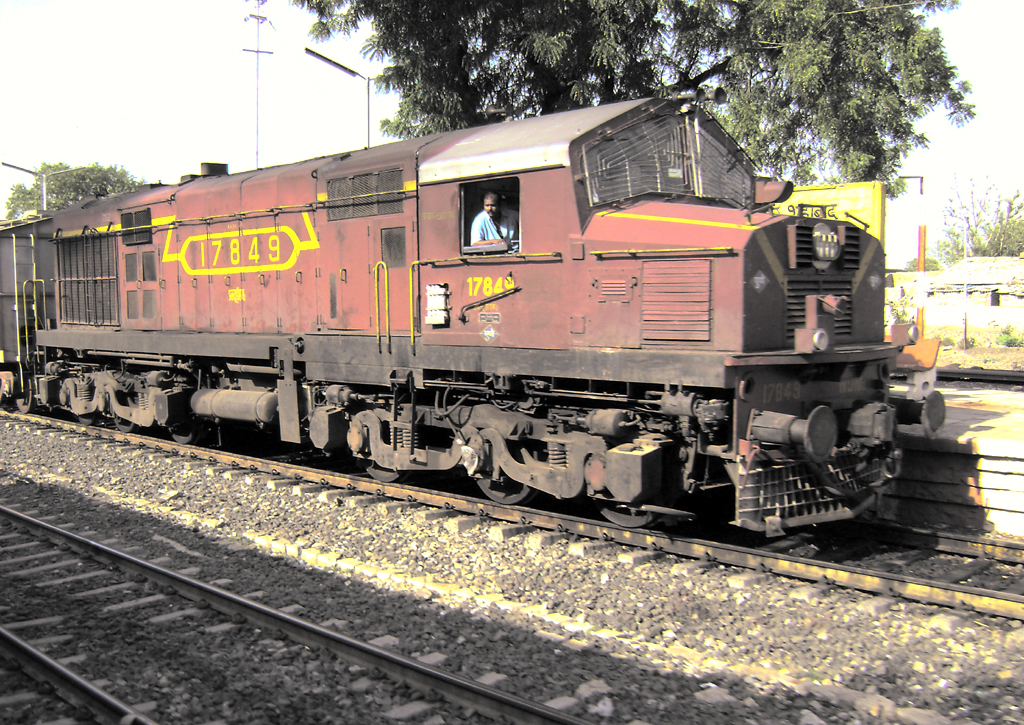
Jumbo variant of the WDM-2

The WDM-2 locomotives from serial numbers around 17788 to 17890 were fitted with full-width short hoods with the intention of improving visibility for drivers. These are unofficially termed 'Jumbos' by crew and rail fans. WDM-2 #17722 and #17748 are rumored to be the prototypes of the jumbo class but differ slightly from other Jumbos. However, these locomotives proved to be not so ergonomic since locomotive pilots observed that they had to stand up to operate them. So a few were modified to have normal short hoods. Some earlier Jumbo locomotives were also converted to WDM-3A.

These locomotives are easily recognisable by their short hoods with large windows. After over-ageing of these locomotives, the jumbos were mainly used on shunting or departmental works trains. All of them are now withdrawn from service and condemned.

=== WDM-2S ===
This classification is given to WDM-2s that are nearing the end of their service life. These locomotives can be easily recognized by '0' at the beginning of their road number. These are relegated to shunting duties, and occasionally haul Departmental works trains. Some WDM-2 units remain in classification for many years before they are scrapped.

== Export versions ==
=== Sri Lanka ===
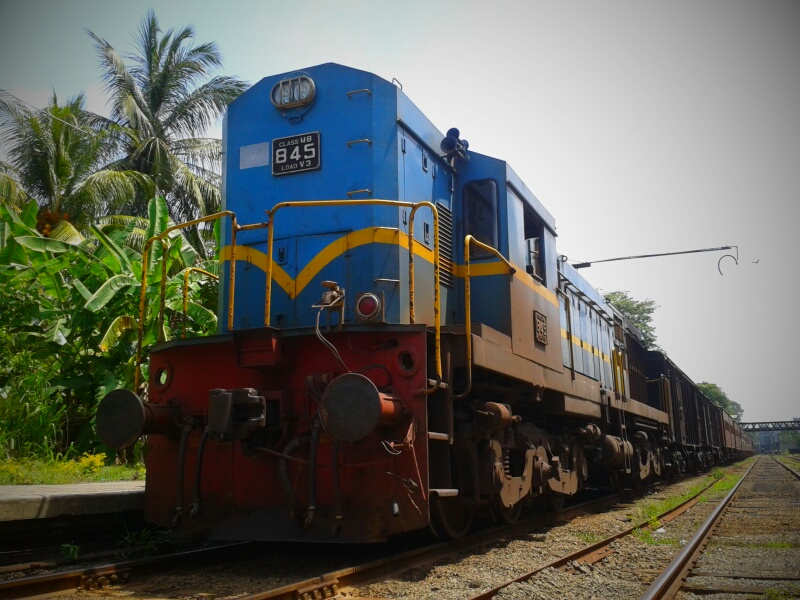
WDM-2, operated as the Class M8 in Sri Lanka

Eight WDM-2 locomotives were purchased by the Sri Lanka Railways, the state-run railroad operator in Sri Lanka in 1996. They were the longest and most powerful locomotives at that time. They were allocated the M8 class. However, some modifications to the appearance were done by SLR. These locomotives have been assigned road numbers 841 to 848 and all are still operational.

=== Bangladesh ===
Ten WDM-2 locomotives were purchased by Bangladesh Railway in 2001. They were the most powerful locomotives at that time. They were allocated Class 6400 or BED-26 numbered from 6401 to 6410. All are fitted with air brake and AAR coupling. Unlike their Indian counterparts, these locomotives do not have the dynamic braking system. All locomotives are still in service.

== Locomotive road numbers ==
During the manufacture of WDM-2, DLW built and numbered these locomotives non-sequentially.

=== 18040–079/18112–18232 series locomotives ===
These locomotives were among the first WDM-2s used in India. Locomotive number 18040 is the first in the series to be imported; subsequent ones were later supplied by ALCO. Locomotives numbered from 18080 to 18111 are actually WDM-4 class. These WDM-2 locomotives can be easily identified by their original ALCO dynamic brake vents with three partitions. They were mostly in mainline service till 2007 and were relegated to shunting/departmental duties thereafter. The last of these locomotives (WDM-2 numbered 18068 from Kurla) were condemned by March 2014. all locomotives of this series have been withdrawn from service with most of them being condemned and scrapped. Some of these units like 18040, have been preserved.

=== 18233–18514-series locomotives ===
After 18232, DLW started manufacturing locomotives from kits supplied by ALCO. The first kit-built from DLW was 18233 named 'Kundan'; subsequent ones were later assembled in DLW from kits supplied by ALCO after technology transfer took place. Some of these locomotives (like WDM-2 18236) have retained their original ALCO dynamic brake vents with three partitions. The first fully built WDM-2 from DLW was 18299. These locomotives were mostly in mainline service till 2007, thereafter relegated to shunting/departmental duties like ALCO-built ones. The last of these locomotives (such as #18473) were condemned by November 2013.

After 18514, DLW started manufacturing '17' series locomotives.

=== 17100–17999, 17-series locomotives ===
DLW stopped 18-series midway (18514) and started producing 17-series locomotives. Locomotives numbered from 17000 to 17099 are WDM-1 class. These were fully built WDM-2 locomotives from DLW. The locomotive numbers 17796–17895 are the Jumbo versions of WDM-2. All of the WDM-2 Jumbos belong to this series. Most of these locomotives were manufactured in the 1970s. Over time, The 17 series locomotives were phased out of service as they reached the end of their lifespan; All pure WDM-2s of this series including the jumbos have been withdrawn from service, condemned or scrapped.

18515–18522 are Indian locomotive class WDM-3 locomotives built by German manufacturers Henschel. these are no longer in service.

=== 18523–18900/18903–18999 series locomotives ===
The locomotives numbering 18523 onward were manufactured from the early 1980s. Almost all of these locomotives underwent rebuilding to the higher-powered WDM-3A standards during their service life. However, as they neared the end of their operational period, most of them were reverted back to WDM-2 standards. All locomotives of this series including both the upgraded WDM-3As and the pure WDM-2s, have been withdrawn from service, condemned or scrapped due to their age and the electrification of Indian Railways.

18901 and 18902 were assigned to WDM-6 class locomotives – no longer in service.

=== 16000–16887 / '16' series locomotives ===
The '16' series represent the youngest and final batch of the WDM-2 series. these units were originally built as WDM-2's between 1988 and 1998, with the oldest unit being number 16000, manufactured on january 27, 1988. over time, most locomotives from this series were rebuilt to the more powerful WDM-3A standard, with the exception of those lost to accidents or collisions. As of august 2025, approximately 149 units, both the pure built WDM-3A's from the '14' series and the rebuild WDM-2s, which are in the '16' series still retain operational status. The pure WDM-2 versions of the '16' series locomotives, along with the WDM-2S units, all have been withdrawn from service, condemned and scrapped. The ongoing railway electrification and the introduction of newer locomotives continue to reduce this number. Rapid scrapping of these aging '16' series units began.

== Liveries ==
- RTM : *1. Red top, Navy blue bottom and white band middle. - *2. Light Blue top, Navy blue bottom and white band middle. - 3. Typical Patiala Workshop livery dark blue top, bottom and white band middle.
- TNP: Light and dark blue bottom. Flying bird on pink background was the logo. Few biodiesel ones were green.
- ERS: A Kerala-based logo with characteristic ICF Rajdhani livery.
- ED: Prancing deer of IR, dark blue with white.
- R: Light Blue Top and Bottom with White Band in middle.
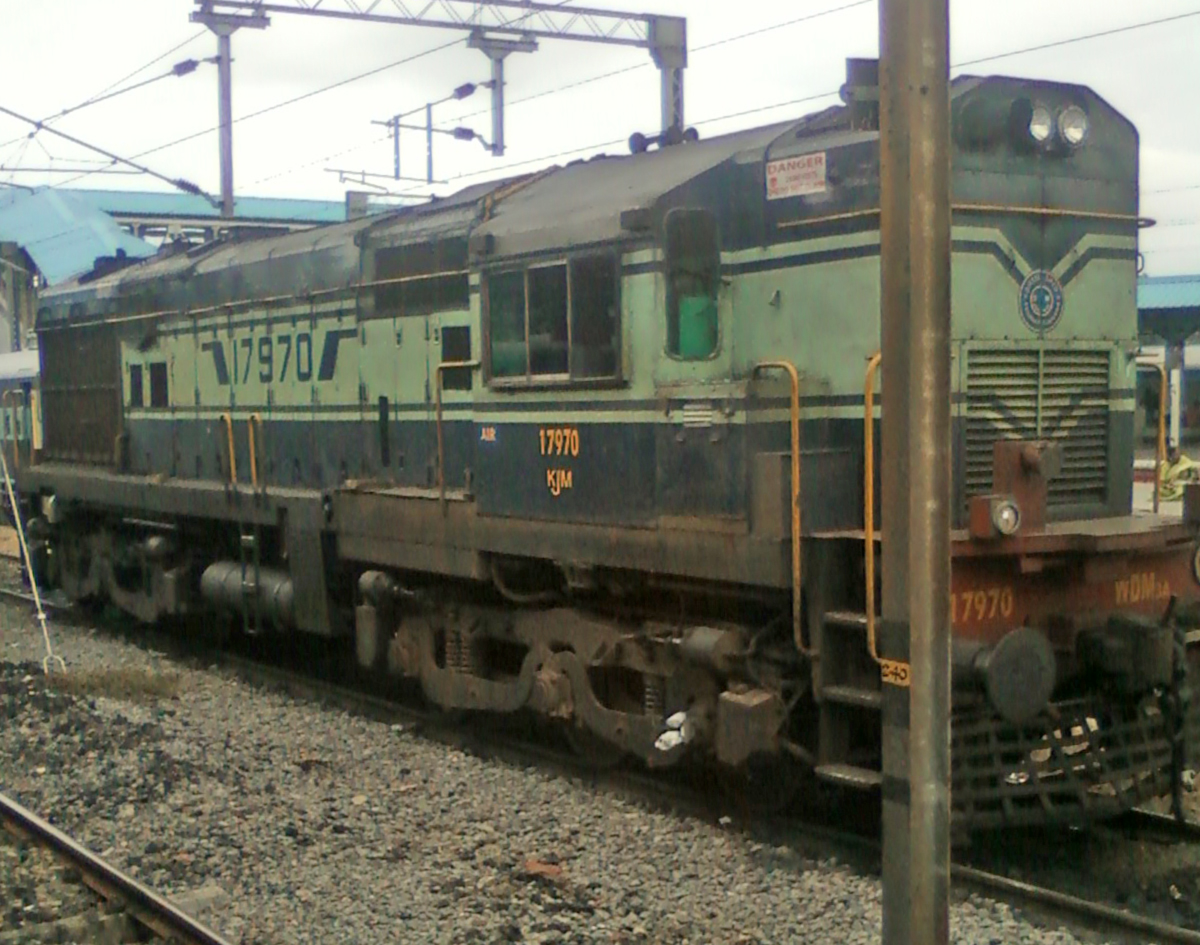
KJM (SWR): dark blue/light blue livery and logo has SWR written in white on blue background.

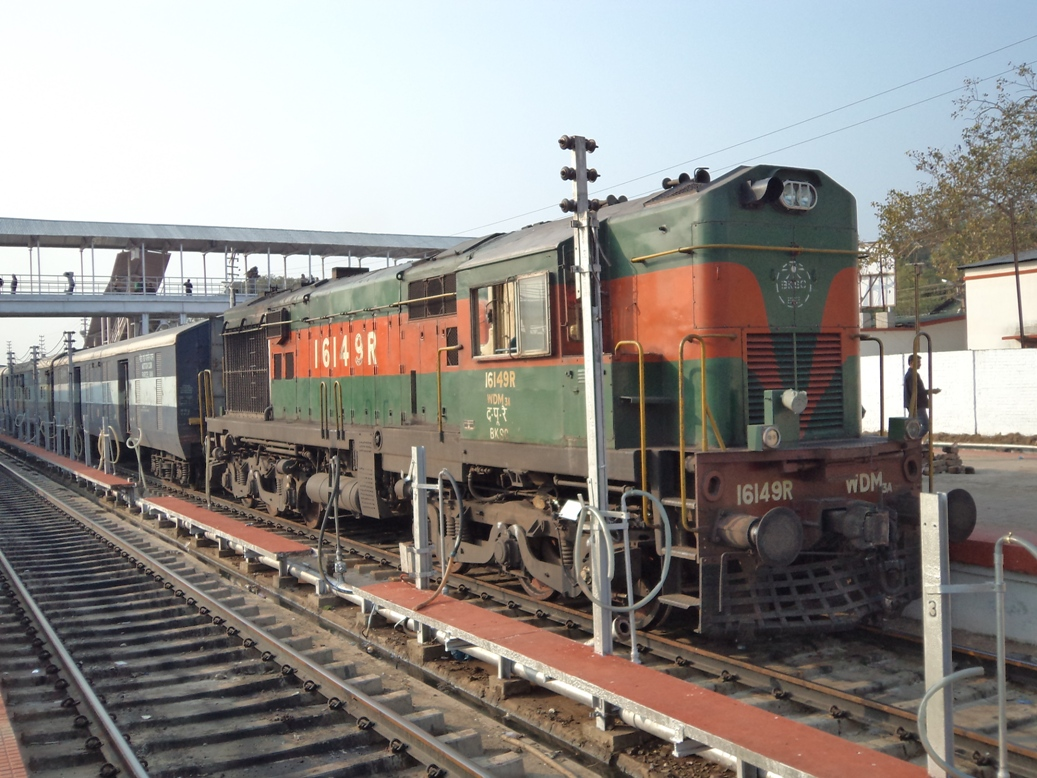
BKSC: Green and orange livery similar to Bangladeshi national flag

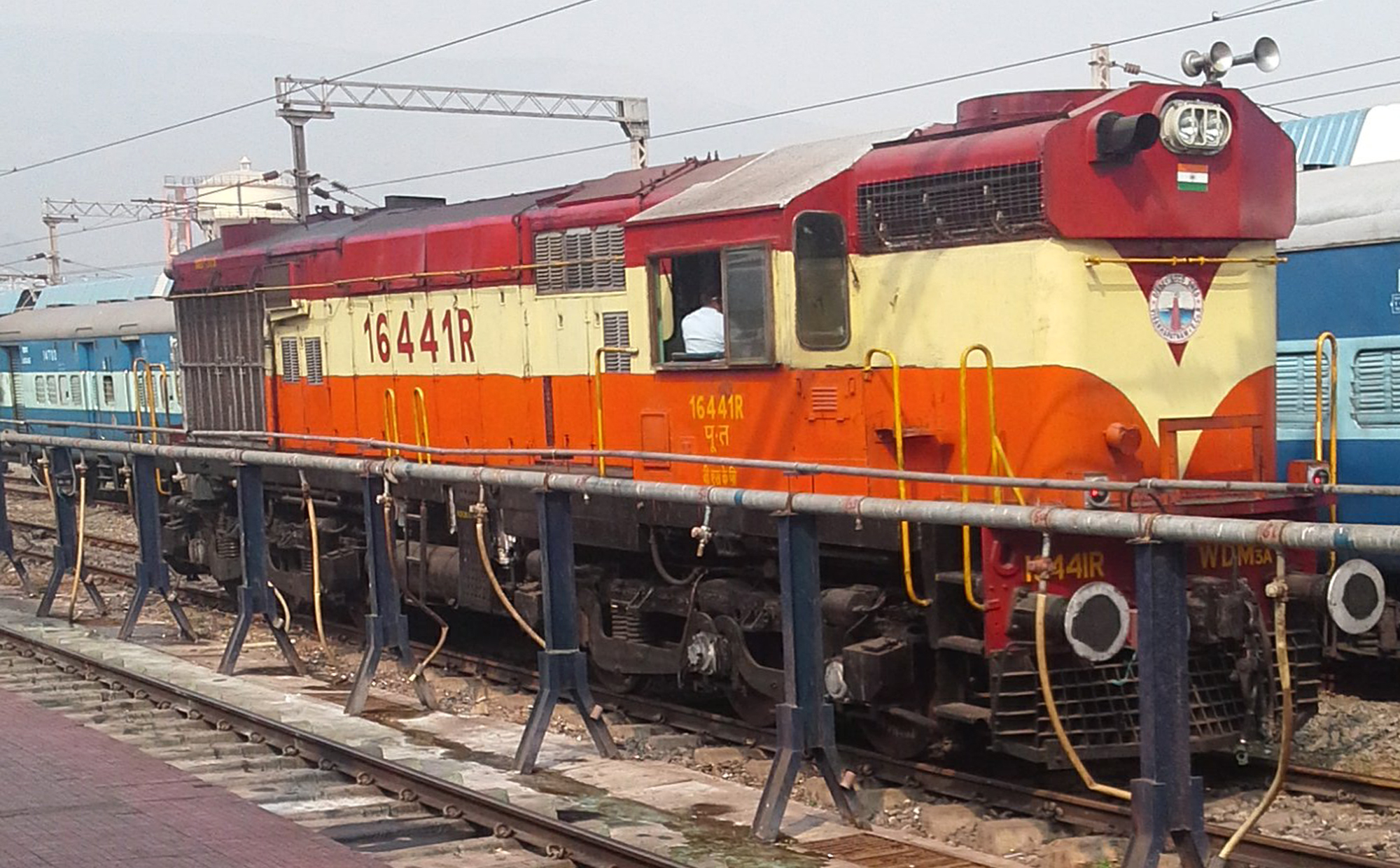
VSKP: red yellow maroon livery

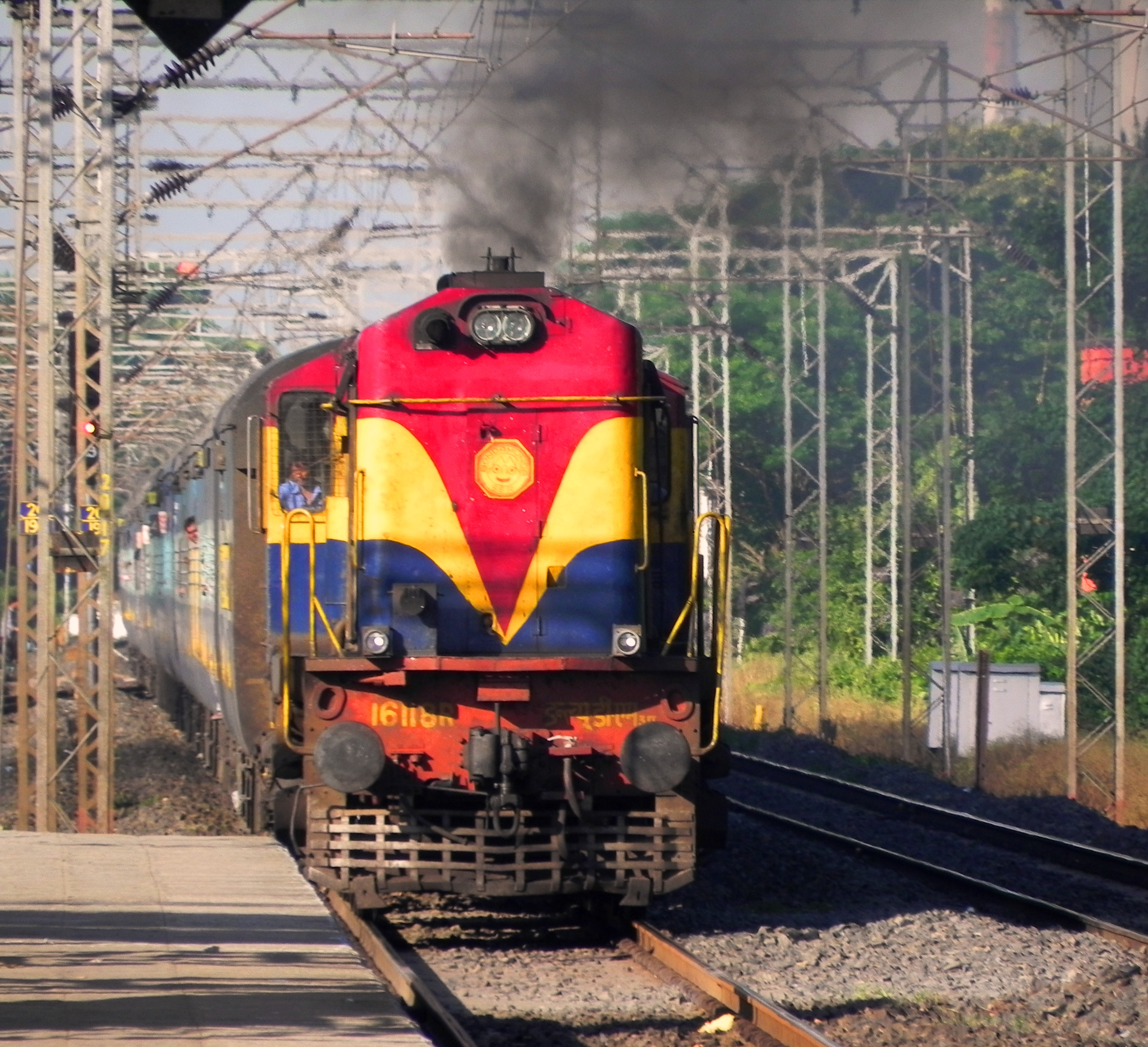
Bondamunda had a red yellow maroon livery somewhat similar to VSKP
- * = Forbidden

== Preserved examples ==
A number of WDM-2 locomotives have been preserved all over India.

Class	Manufacturer	Loco Number	Previous shed	Name	Livery	Location	ref
WDM-2/3A	BLW	16000	Andal (UDL)		UDL dark green with yellow stripe	Preserved at Howrah Rail Museum [Dec 2021]	
WDM-2B	BLW	17307	Malda Town (MLDT)		MLDT blue/cream/blue with red lining	Plinthed at Malda Town DLS	
WDM-2	BLW	17445	Kazipet (KZJ)		Earmarked for preservation: I.R. Heritage Website [November 2018]		
WDM-3A/2A	BLW	17754	Ludhiana (LDH)		LDH grey/red/grey with white lining	Earmarked for preservation: I.R. Heritage Website [November 2018]	
WDM-2	ALCO	18040	Katni (KTE)		Maroon with yellow lining & blue Stripes	Preserved at National Rail Museum, New Delhi	
WDM-2	ALCo	18113	Itarsi (ET)		Light blue with white band	Plinthed at Zonal Railway Training Institute, Bhusaval	
WDM-2	ALCo	18119	Itarsi (ET)		Light blue with white band	Plinthed at Zonal Railway Training Institute, Bhusaval	
WDM-2A	ALCo	18160	Ernakulam (ERS)		Red	This loco is preserved in GOC workshop.	
WDM-2	BLW	18233	Mughalsarai (MGS)	Kundan	Red/white/grey	Permanent Exhibit at DLW, Varanasi	
WDM-2B	BLW	18575	Malda Town (MLDT)		MLDT blue/cream/blue with red lining	Earmarked for preservation: I.R. Heritage Website [November 2018]	
WDM-2/3A	BLW	18599	Krishnarajapuram (KJM)		KJM blue/turquoise/blue with blue lining	Plinthed at SWR Headquarters Office - Rail Soudha, Hubballi, glass panels on one side	

== Former sheds ==
- Abu Road (ABR)
- Andal (UDL)
- Bardhaman (BWN)
- Bokaro Steel City (BKSC)
- Bondamunda (BNDM)
- Deen Dayal Upadhaya (DDU)
- Ernakulam (ERS)- The very last WDM-2 (18701) was removed from service in June 2019 after being in the shed for 38 years.
- Erode (ED)
- Gonda (GD)
- Gooty (GY)
- Guntakal (GTL)
- Howrah (HWH)
- Itarsi (ET)
- Izzatnagar Loco Shed (IZN)
- Jhansi (JHS)
- Kalyan (KYN)
- Kazipet (KZJ)
- Kharagpur (KGP)
- Krishnarajapuram (KJM)
- Lucknow (LKO)
- Ludhiana (LDH)
- Moula Ali (MLY)
- Pune (PUNE)
- New Guwahati (NGC)
- Raipur (R)
- Patratu (PTRU)
- Ratlam (RTM)
- Samastipur (SPJ)
- Tughlakabad (TKD)
- Tondiapet (TNP)
- Vatva (VTA)
- Visakhapatnam (VSKP)
- Malda Town (MLDT)

== Technical specifications ==
Manufacturers	Alco, DLW
Engine	Alco 251-B, 16 cylinder engine, 2,600 hp (1,900 kW) (2,430 hp or 1,810 kW site rating) with Alco 710/720/?? turbo supercharged engine. 1,000 rpm max, 400 rpm idle; 228 mm × 266 mm (8.98 in × 10.47 in) bore x stroke; compression ratio 12.5:1. Direct fuel injection, centrifugal pump cooling system (2,457 L/min or 540 imp gal/min or 649 US gal/min at 1,000 rpm), fan driven by eddy current clutch (86 hp or 64 kW at 1,000 rpm)
Governor	GE 17MG8 / Woodwards 8574-650 / Medha MEG 601
Transmission	Electric, with BHEL TG 10931 AZ generator (1,000 rpm, 770 V, 4,520 A)
Traction motors	GE752 (original Alco models) (405 hp or 302 kW), BHEL 4906 BZ (AZ?) (435 hp or 324 kW) and (newer) 4907 AZ (with roller bearings)
Axle load	18.8 t (18.5 long tons; 20.7 short tons)
total weight	112.8 t (111.0 long tons; 124.3 short tons)
Bogies	Alco design cast frame trimount (Co-Co) bogies
Starting TE	30.4 t (29.9 long tons; 33.5 short tons), at adhesion 27%
Length over buffer beams	15,862 mm (52 ft 1/2 in)
Distance between bogies	10,516 mm (34 ft 6 in)

== Image gallery ==
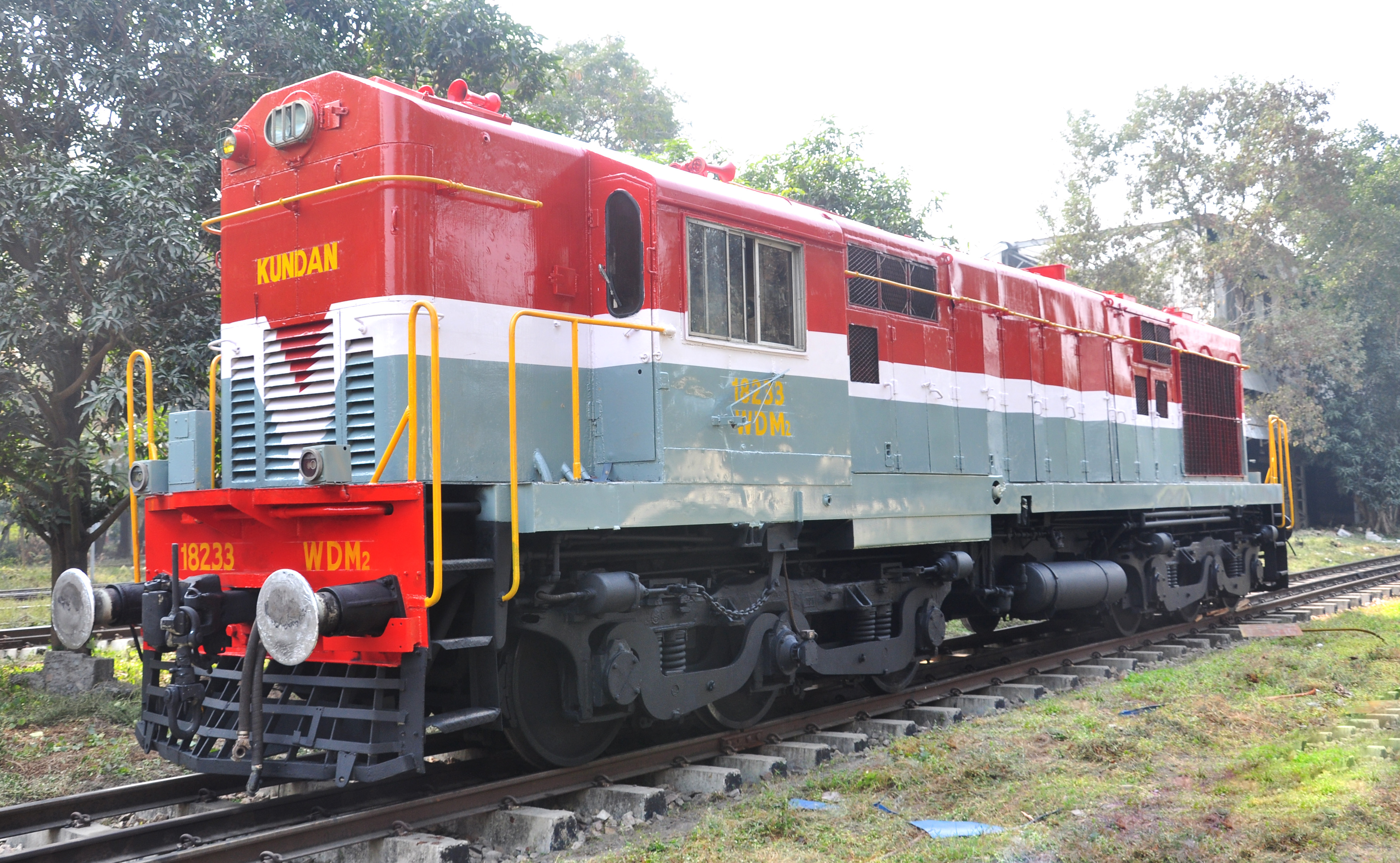
Kundan, the first WDM-2 locomotive assembled at DLW

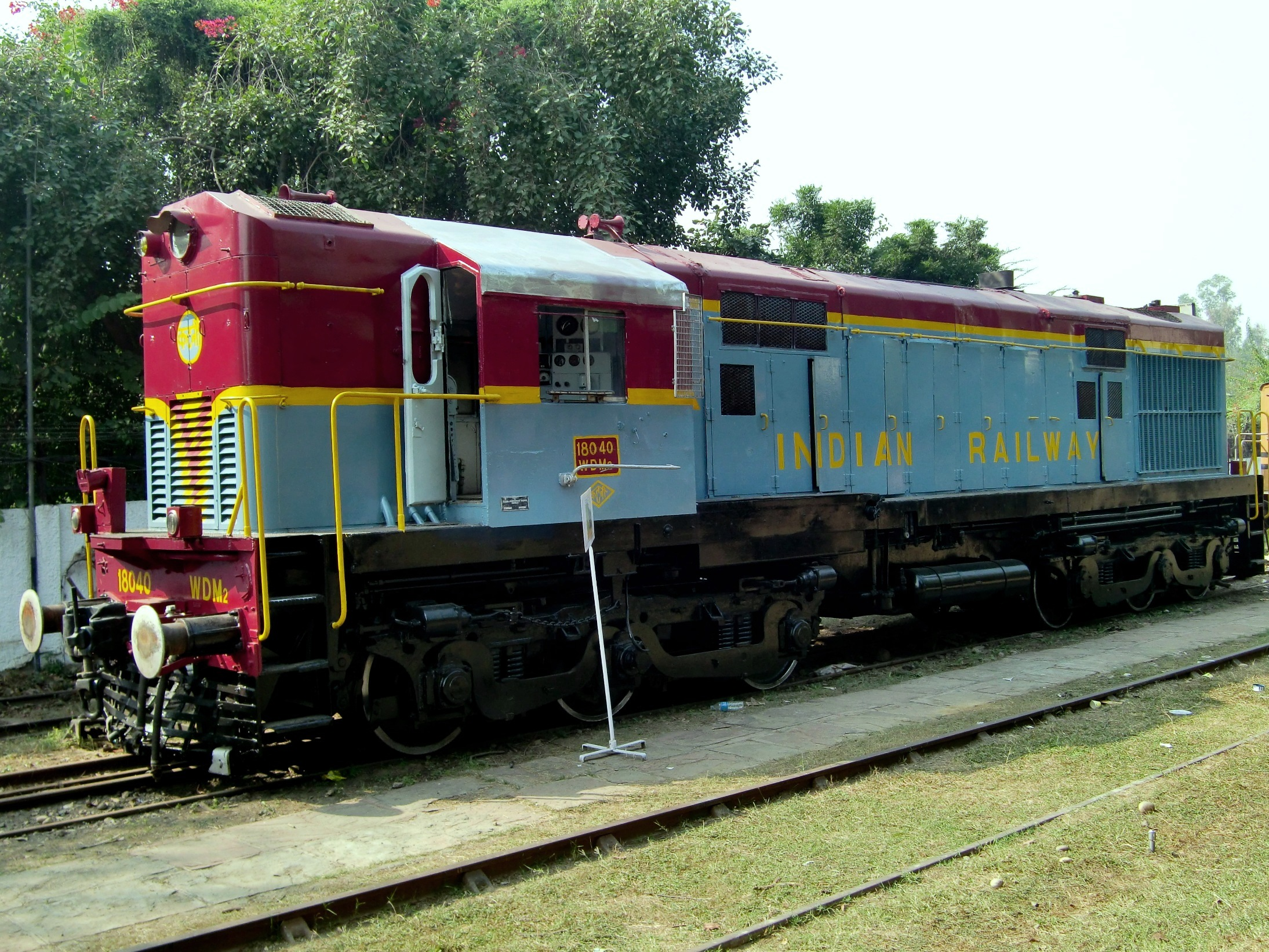
The first WDM-2 18040 preserved at national rail museum, New delhi

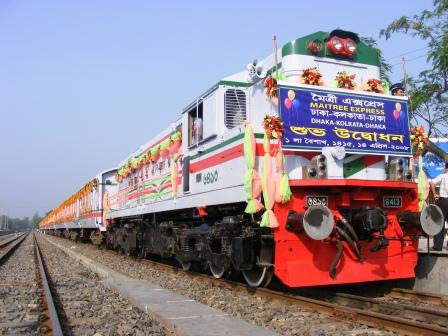
WDM-2 is known as Class 6400 in Bangladesh

== See also ==
- List of diesel locomotives of India
- Rail transport in India
