= Indian locomotive class WDM-1 =

Class of Indian diesel locomotives built by ALCO

WDM-1
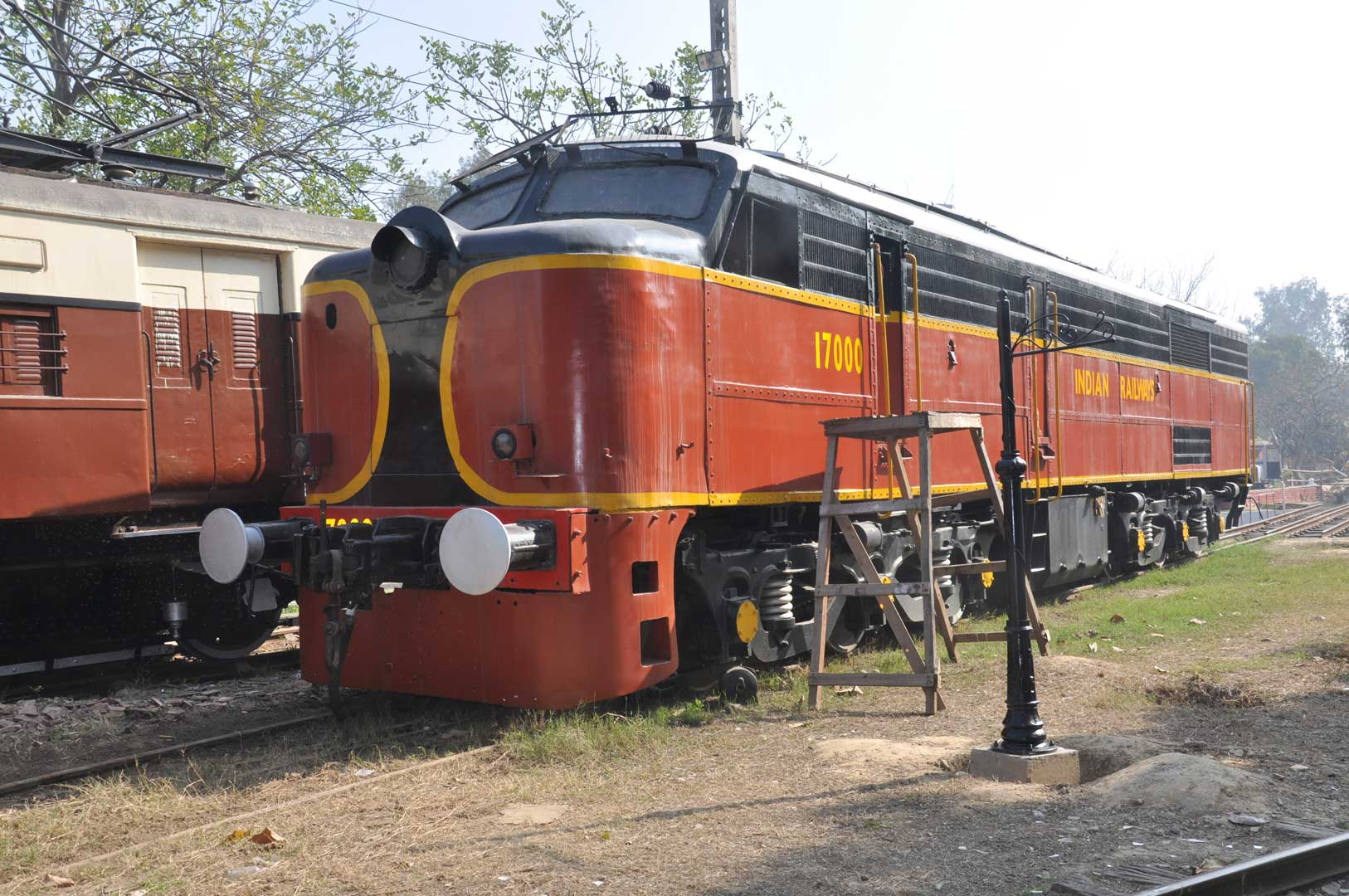
- A WDM-1 preserved at NRM, New Delhi
Type and origin
- Power type: Diesel
- Builder: ALCo
- Model: DL500C
- Build date: 1957–1959
- Total produced: 100
Specifications
- Configuration
  - AAR: C-C
  - UIC: Co-Co
- Gauge: 1,676 mm (5 ft 6 in)
- Loco weight: 111.2 t (109.4 long tons; 122.6 short tons)
- Fuel type: Diesel fuel
- Engine type: 12 cylinder, four-stroke diesel
- Aspiration: Turbo-supercharged
- Cylinders: 12
- Transmission: Electric
Performance figures
- Maximum speed: Max: 104 km/h (65 mph); Rated: 100 km/h (62 mph)
- Power output: Max: 1,950 hp (1,450 kW); Net: 1,800 hp (1,300 kW)
- Tractive effort: 27,900 kgf (274 kN; 61,509 lbf)
Career
- Operators: Indian Railways
- Numbers: 17000-17099
- Locale: Eastern Railway, South-eastern Railway and South-Central Railway
- Withdrawn: 2000
- Preserved: 1 (#17000) at NRM
- Disposition: Withdrawn from service, one preserved, remainder scrapped

The WDM-1 was the first class of wide gauge (W), diesel-powered (D), mixed-load (M) locomotive, meant for hauling both freight and passenger trains. These are also the first mainline diesel engines imported after Independence. They were even the fastest diesel locomotives till the advent of WDM-2 and WDM-4. They used to haul ore/freight trains on SER. In the end, they were relegated to shunting/piloting duties or hauling sugarcane freight trains. All locomotives of this class have been withdrawn from service. One unit, #17000, is preserved at National Rail Museum, Delhi.

== Trains hauled by WDM-1 ==
- Howrah–Chennai Mail
- Kakinada Madras Circar Express
- Guntur Waltair Simhadri Express

== See also ==
- Indian Railways
- List of diesel locomotives of India
- Indian locomotive class WDM-2
