= Indian locomotive class WDAP-5 =

Indian railway locomotive class

WDAP-5
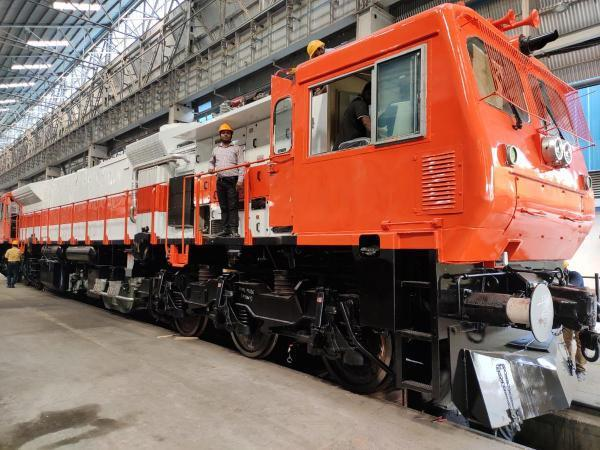
- BLW manufactured WDAP-5
Type and origin
- Power type: Dual-mode
- Builder: Banaras Locomotive Works
- Model: WDAP-5
- Build date: 2019
- Total produced: 1
Specifications
- Configuration
  - UIC: Co-Co
- Gauge: 5 ft 6 in (1,676 mm)
- Fuel type: Diesel
- Power supply: 25 kV AC overhead
- Current pickup: Pantograph
Performance figures
- Maximum speed: 150.8 km/h (93.7 mph) (electric; trials)
- Power output: 5,500 hp (4,100 kW) (electric); 4,500 hp (3,400 kW) (diesel)
Career
- Numbers: 71000

The Indian locomotive class WDAP-5 is a class of diesel-electric dual mode locomotive that was developed in 2019 by Banaras Locomotive Works (BLW), Varanasi for Indian Railways. The model name stands for broad gauge (W), Diesel (D), AC Current (A), Passenger (P) and 5000 Horsepower (5). The locomotive can deliver 5,500 hp (4,100 kW) in electric mode and 4,500 hp (3,400 kW)) in diesel mode.

== Need for dual mode locomotive ==
Since 2016, Indian Railways has pushed for greater electrification of the railway network. In this interest, the government, in 2019, approved plans for 100% electrification. Indian Railways had electrified over 68,000 km (42,000 mi), about 98% of the total broad gauge network, by June 2025. Using electric locomotives allows the railways to save time by giving a faster acceleration and also saves fuel costs. However, these advantages are offset under certain circumstances where the route of the train is partly electrified. In such cases, trains used to run with a diesel locomotive in non-electrified sections and would be switched with an electric locomotive as soon as they enter an electrified section.

Instead of benefiting from electrification, IR observed a loss of punctuality in such trains due to valuable time being lost to switch between diesel and electric locomotives. To counter this, in August 2019, Railways issued a circular, asking all zones to haul trains with a diesel locomotive if their route was not completely electrified. This meant that electrification of railway lines, unless completed end-to-end, did not provide any advantage. This problem had been identified by the Railways, way back in 2016, which is when RDSO was requested to study the feasibility of dual-mode locomotives as a stop-gap until 100% electrification was achieved.

However the COVID-19 pandemic had resulted in the stoppage of regular trains. The time window was used by Indian Railways to electrify the railways. As of 1 April 2024, 97% of the network is electrified. The railways aims to electrify the entire network by the end of this year. Hence there is not much use of this locomotive as its purpose is served mainly by electric locomotives. So no WDAP-5s were produced other than 71000. Loco no. 71000 is in service with Tughlakabad locoshed.

== Locomotive shed ==
Zone	Name	Shed code	Quantity
Northern Railway	Tughlakabad	TKD (D)	1
Total locomotives active as of June 2025			1
