= Indian locomotive class WDP-4 =

Indian Railways passenger class diesel locomotive

WDP-4
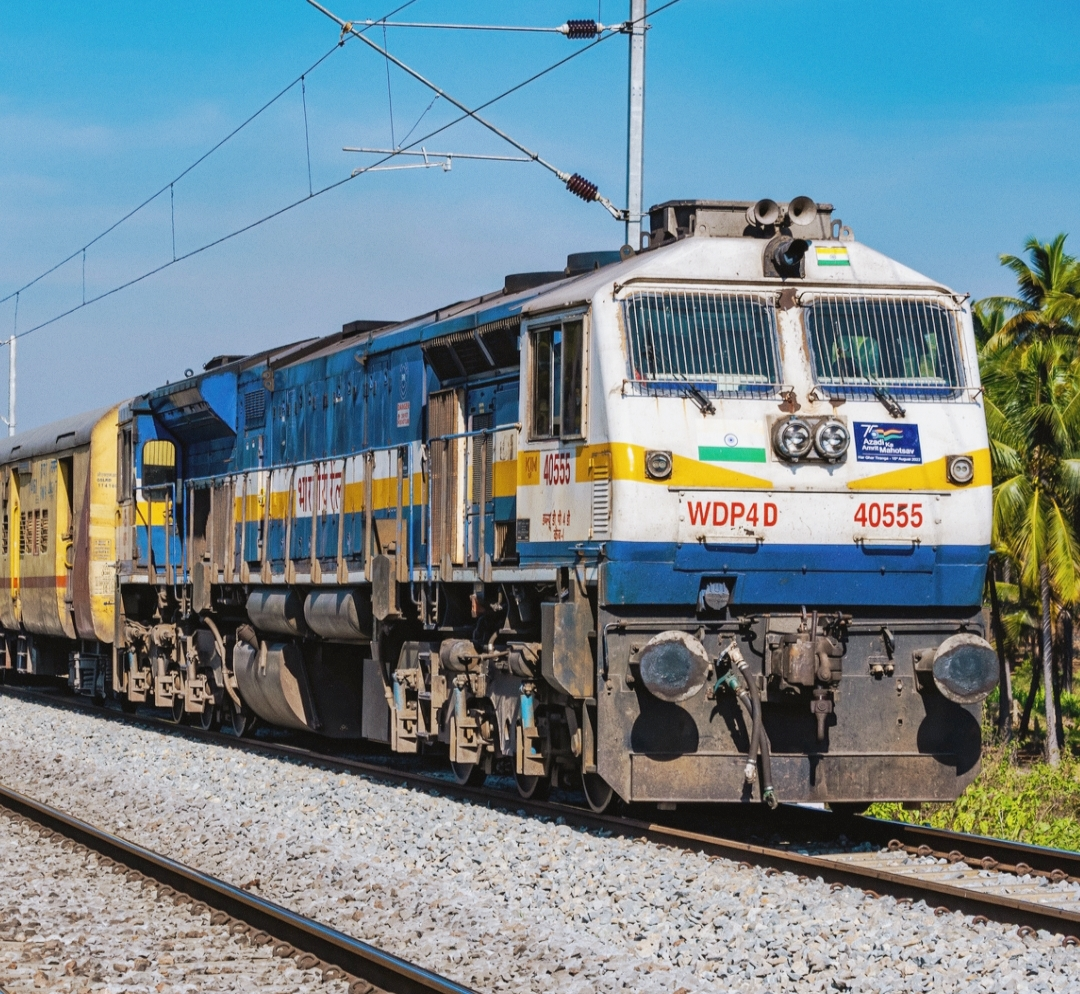
- KJM based WDP-4D hauling Chamrajnagar - Tumakuru Passenger.
Type and origin
- Power type: Diesel–electric
- Builder: EMD & BLW
- Model: GT46PAC (2000–2007); GT46PACe (2007–2012); JT46PACe (2010–2017)
- Build date: (EMD) 2000–2001 (DLW) 2003–2017
- Total produced: WDP-4: 100; WDP-4B: 86; WDP-4D: 525
Specifications
- Configuration
  - UIC: (Bo1)(1Bo), later Co'Co'
  - Commonwealth: Bo1-1Bo, later Co-Co
- Gauge: 5 ft 6 in (1,676 mm)
- Trucks: high adhesion HTSC (High Tensile Steel Cast)
- Wheel diameter: 1,092 mm (43.0 in)
- Axle load: WDP-4 : 19.5 t (19.2 long tons; 21.5 short tons); WDP4B : 20.2 t (19.9 long tons; 22.3 short tons); WDP4D : 20.5 t (20.2 long tons; 22.6 short tons)
- Loco weight: WDP4 : 115.8 t (114.0 long tons; 127.6 short tons); WDP4B : 117 t (115 long tons; 129 short tons); WDP4D : 123 t (121 long tons; 136 short tons)
- Fuel type: Diesel fuel
- Fuel capacity: 5,000–6,100 L (1,100–1,300 imp gal; 1,300–1,600 US gal)
- Prime mover: EMD 16-710G3B
- RPM range: 200 - 954 rpm
  - RPM low idle: 200 rpm
  - RPM idle: 269 rpm
  - Maximum RPM: 954 rpm
- Engine type: 2-stroke V16 diesel
- Aspiration: turbocharged
- Displacement: 186.16 L (11,360 cu in)
- Alternator: WDP4 / WDP4B : GM TA-17 (main) with CA-6B (companion); WDP4D : EMD TA-17 (main) with C6AB (companion) or BHEL TA 9901 (main) with AA 9201 (companion)
- Traction motors: WDP4 : Siemens 1TB2622-0TB02; WDP4B : Siemens 1TB2622-0TA02 or EMD A 2916-8; WDP4D : Siemens 1TB2525-0TA02 or EMD A 2916-8
  - Continuous: 1250 Amps DC
- Cylinders: 16
- Transmission: AC Electric
- Gear ratio: 17:77
- Loco brake: Air, Handbrake, Blended (not in WDP4), Dynamic brake
- Train brakes: Graduated Release Twin Pipe Air Brakes (IRAB-1 Compatible)
Performance figures
- Maximum speed: WDP-4 : Service : 160 km/h (99 mph); Testing : 180 km/h (110 mph) WDP-4B : 130 km/h (81 mph) WDP-4D : 135 km/h (84 mph)
- Power output: 4,000 hp (2,980 kW) (WDP4); 4,500 hp (3,360 kW) (WDP4B); 4,500 hp (3,360 kW) (WDP4D)
- Tractive effort: WDP-4 : 27,550 kgf (270.2 kN) WDP-4B : 40,775 kgf (399.87 kN) WDP-4D : 43,788 kgf (429.41 kN)
Career
- Operators: Indian Railways; SNTF(Algeria) - as EMD GT-36 HCW, with just minor modifications in the body design, along with down-rating the power output to 3,600 HP (2.7 MW) using a 16-645 F 3B, as the number GT-"36"
- Numbers: 20000 - 20103, 40001 - 40608
- Locale: India
- Unless specified otherwise, data is obtained from RDSO diagram books, given in references.

The Indian locomotive class WDP-4 (EMD GT46PAC) is a passenger-hauling diesel–electric locomotive with AC electric transmission designed by General Motors Electro-Motive Division and built by both GM-EMD and under license by Banaras Locomotive Works (BLW) of Varanasi, India for the Indian Railways as the classes WDP4, WDP4B and WDP4D. The GT46PAC is a passenger version of the previous Indian Railways EMD GT46MAC (WDG-4) freight locomotive. The locomotive has a 16-cylinder 710G3B diesel engine and is one of the fastest diesel–electric locomotives in service in Indian Railways.

== Variants ==
=== WDP-4 ===
The WDP-4 was the loco originally designed by GM EMD and 10 of them were dispatched to India by June 2001. Later on Banaras Locomotive Works, Varanasi started building them initially using knocked-down kits and later indigenously. Starting 2003, the locomotives were produced in large numbers by BLW. The locomotive features self diagnostics control using EM2000 onboard microprocessor which was a new technology for Indian Railways back then.

Unlike the Co-Co wheel arrangement featured on most locomotives, including its freight hauling variant, WDG-4, this loco has a Bo1-1Bo wheel arrangement meaning that it has two powered and one unpowered axle per bogie. This was done to reduce the weight of the loco to make it suitable for passenger operations and also to reduce maintenance.

==== Visibility Issue ====
The use of the locomotive with the long hood forward configuration has been criticised with respect to the driver's visibility as it is affected due to the protruding radiator section at the hood-end. This criticism has been rejected by the Railways. However, in response, the cab profile of some WDP-4s were widened with a Piggy-face profile, to increase the field of view from the control cab and the WDP-4B variant was also produced with the same widened cab profile.

=== WDP-4B ===
This was the first attempt of the Railways to improve upon the successful WDP-4 locomotive. The Bo1-1Bo was found inadequate for hauling 24 coach passenger trains due to the reduced tractive effort. As a result, DLW, reconfigured the chassis to be Co-Co instead. This led to better adhesion with the rails to provide better acceleration with heavy trains. Moreover, the original EMD 710 engine was tweaked to produce an output of 4,500 HP instead of the original 4,000 HP. this Up-rated engine was designated as EMD 16N-710G3B-EC, with an RPM of 910 at Notch-8. This locomotive came to be known as the "GT46PACe". One more important change added to this loco was the inclusion of Blended Brake System. This was added to maximise the use of Dynamic brakes by the loco-pilot and therefore minimise the wear and tear on the fixed brake rigging of the coaches and the locomotive. The addition of blended brake is responsible for the subclass to be designated with a 'B'. Some more features are the widened piggy-face cab profile to aid visibility, change in the Traction Motor blower by installing a higher power motor and increase in the axle load to 20.2 tonnes (19.9 long tons; 22.3 short tons). The locomotive also has a self-load test feature that allows it to test the net output of the engine. In Siemens and EMD systems, the loco has been provided with 2 traction inverters (TCC-1 and TCC-2, for the respective bogies) while in the Medha system, it has 6 traction inverters, one for each traction motor.

=== WDP-4D ===
The final alterations to the GT46PAC came in the form of the WDP-4D. The locomotive is the most distinctively identifiable of the three thanks to the addition of a second cab at the long hood end of the locomotive. Due to the heat generated from the radiator at the second cab end of the locomotive, DLW had to install air conditioning to protect both the electrical components and the loco-pilot from the high temperatures.

The existing features from WDP-4B have been carried forward to this class and it exclusively features the widened cab profile. Since it is a Dual Cab now, it is called as "JT46PACe". The loco features a completely different desk control stand, provided by Medha with digital display screens allowing for remote fault diagnostics.

Many locos also have GSM-R based transmission antennae to transmit critical loco info for use by maintenance and signalling staff. It features electro-pneumatic microprocessor based control adapted from the WDP-4B and brake system equipment of KNORR/NYAB CCB type.

This loco again with Dual-Cab, but with More Power and Better Fuel Consumption and State-of-the-Art features compared to ALCo DL560C, along with an Air Conditioned Hood Cab, became a very efficient replacement of WDP-3A (ALCO DL560C) alias "Toaster".

== Builders ==
The first set of 10 locos starting from road number 20000 to 20009 were manufactured by the Electro Motive Diesel (EMD) of (General Motors) while road numbers 20011 upwards have been manufactured by Banaras Locomotive Works (DLW) of Varanasi in collaboration with GM (General motors). Siemens and Medha are part of this group providing a large number of components of the electronics on board this loco such as the control stand and traction inverters. Additional components are acquired through tenders and a bidding process.

== Locomotive sheds ==
Zone	Name	Shed Code	Quantity
Zone	Name	Shed Code	WDP-4/4B/4D
Central Railway	Pune	PADX	26
Central Railway	Kalyan	KYDX	12
Eastern Railway	Howrah	HWHD	18
Northern Railway	Ludhiana	LDHD	77
Northern Railway	Lucknow	AMVD	28
Northern Railway	Tughlakabad	TKDD	59
North Central Railway	Jhansi	JHSD	8
North Eastern Railway	Izzatnagar	IZND	16
Northeast Frontier Railway	Guwahati	NGCD	72
Northeast Frontier Railway	Siliguri	SGUD	63
North Western Railway	Bhagat Ki Kothi	BGKD	93
Southern Railway	Ponmalai Goldenrock	GOCD	48
South Coast Railway	Gooty	GYD	16
South Central Railway	Moula Ali	MLYD	12
South Central Railway	Kazipet	KZJD	7
South Western Railway	Krishnarajapuram	KJMD	98
South Western Railway	SSS Hubballi	UBLD	31
Western Railway	Sabarmati	SBTD	22
West Central Railway	Itarsi	ETD	4
Total Locomotives Active as of November 2026			710

== Trains Hauled By WDP-4 ==
- Poorna Express (LHB rakes)
- Sairang & Agartala Rajdhani Express (LHB rake)
- Kanchanjunga Express (LHB rakes)
- Kolkata Agartala Garib Rath Express (LHB rake)
- Tutari Express

== WDAP-5 Dual Mode Locomotive ==
Indian Railway was planning for a dual mode locomotive from 2015. In 2019 Banaras Locomotive Works Varanasi, RDSO and CLW together have got the successes of producing a new class of dual mode locomotive named WDAP-5 which can run on both diesel and electric. The design of the locomotive is based on WDP-4D and the bogies were taken from WDG-5. It has been designed for a speed capable of 135kmph. It will produce 4500Hp in diesel mode and 5500Hp in electric mode. The fuel tank capacity is 3000 liters which is half of the WDP-4's due to weight saving. Only 1 unit has been produced until now and it is in trial with RDSO. It will pull all passenger trains equipped with LHB coaches just like WAP-7 in yet later after a speed trials

== Gallery ==
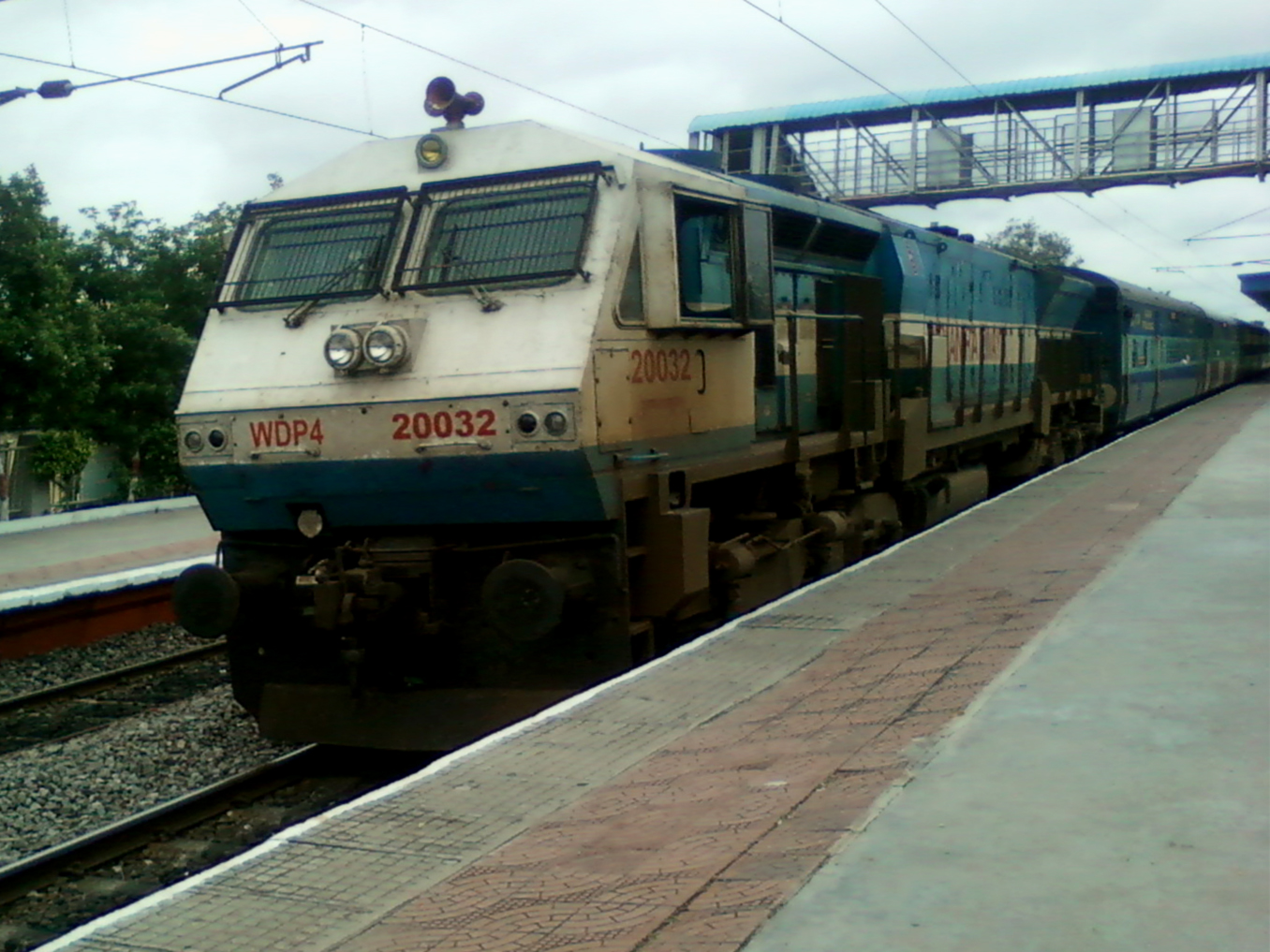
WDP4 No. 20032

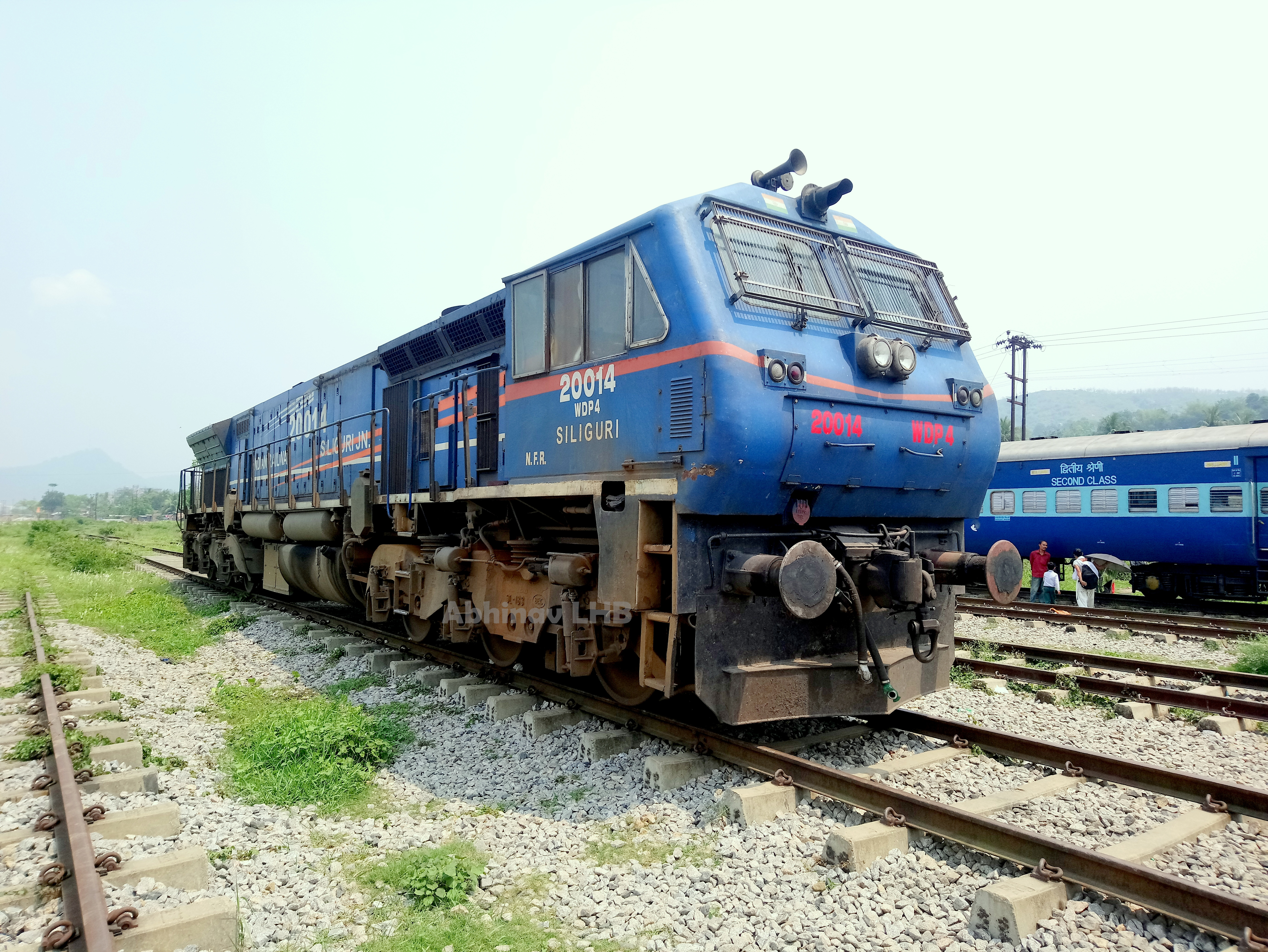
WDP4 No. 20014

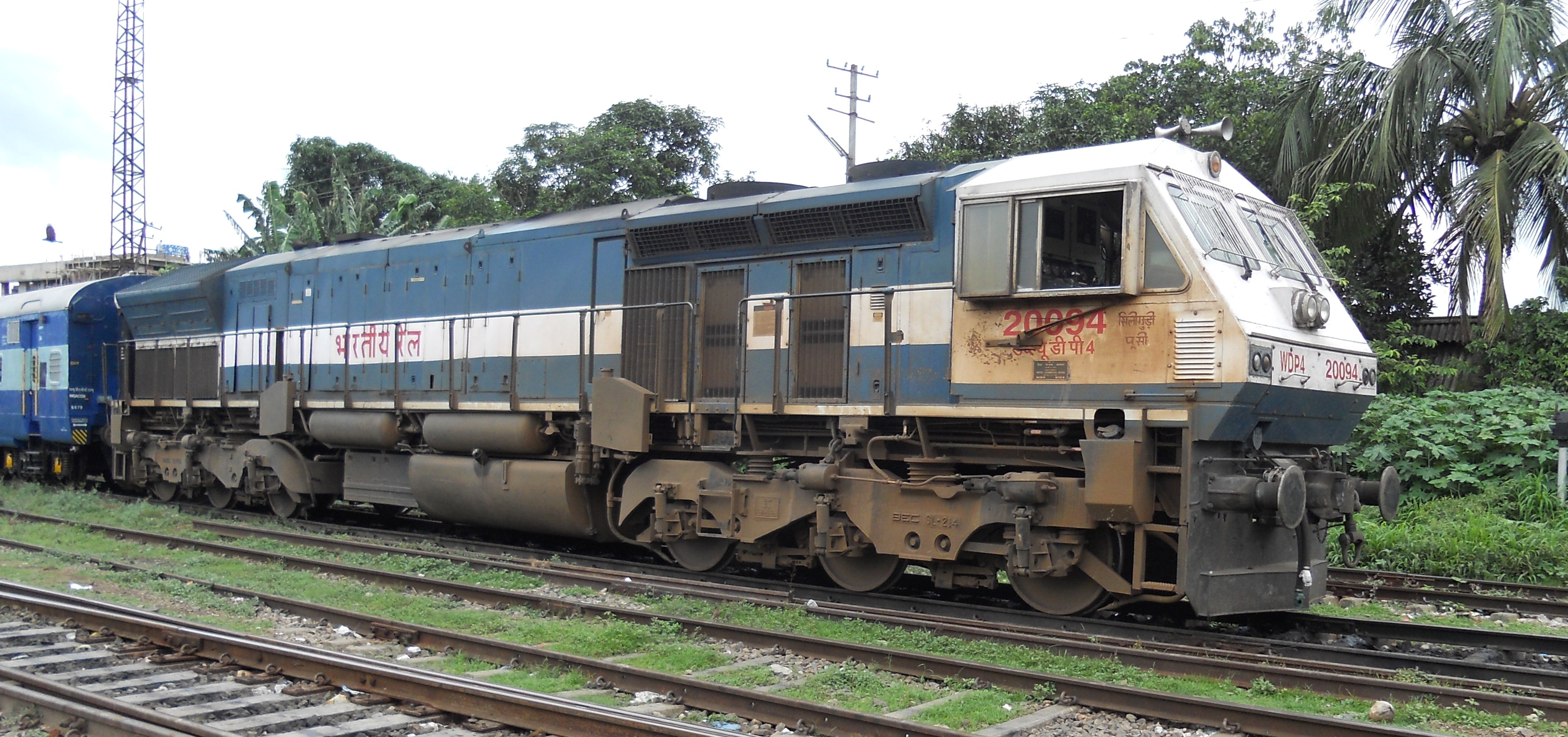
WDP4 No. 20094

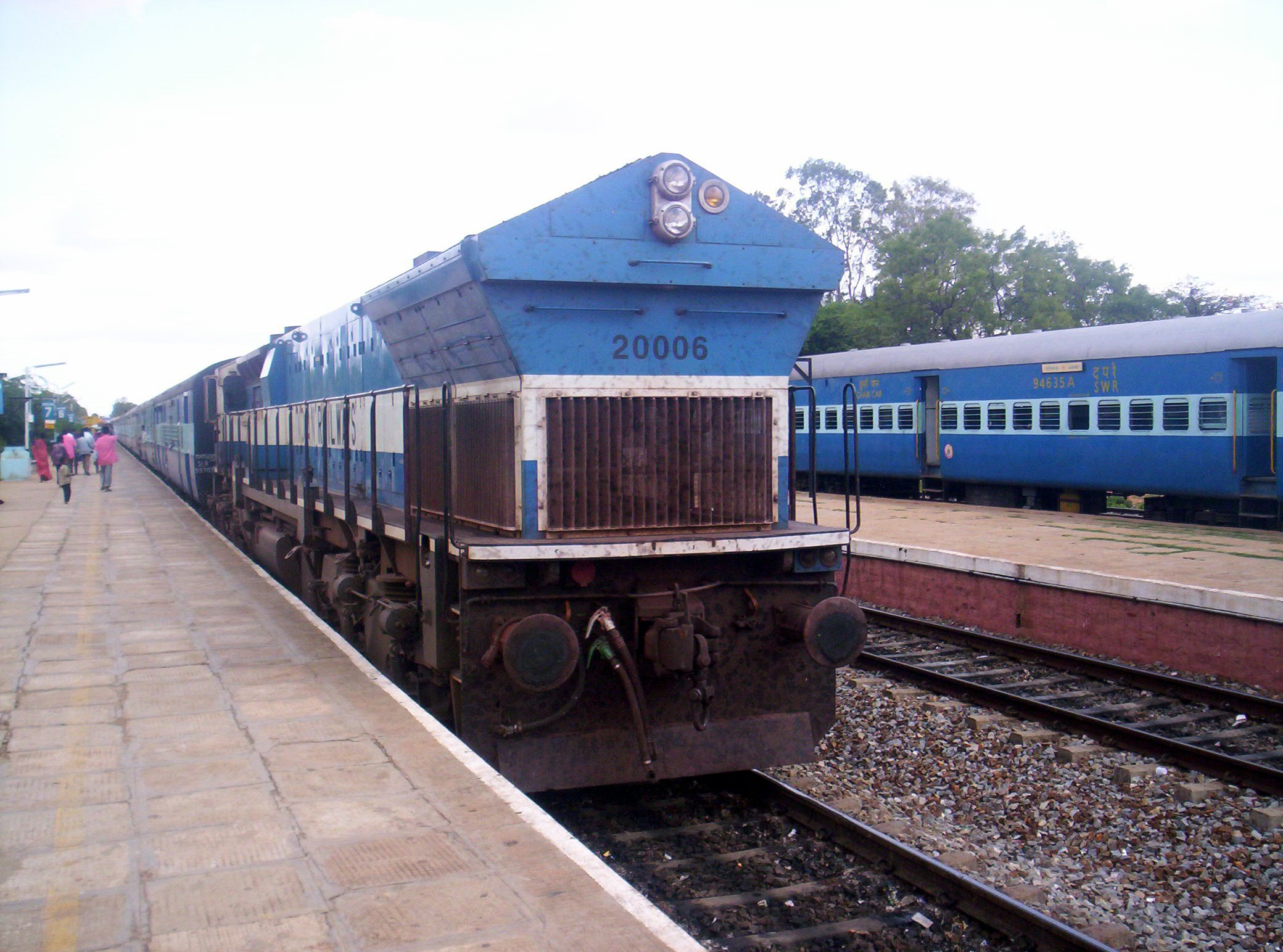
WDP4 No. 20006

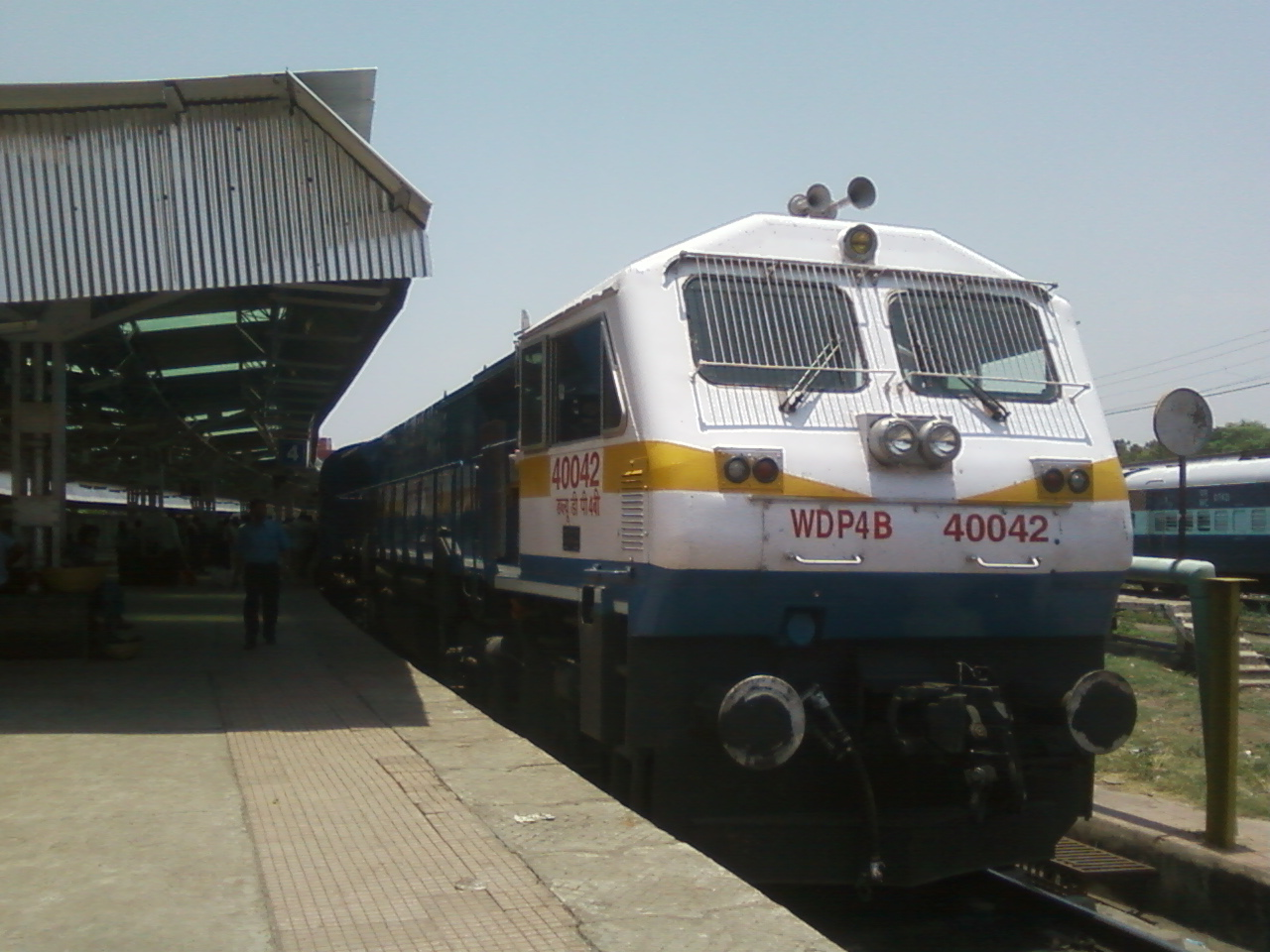
WDP4B No. 40042

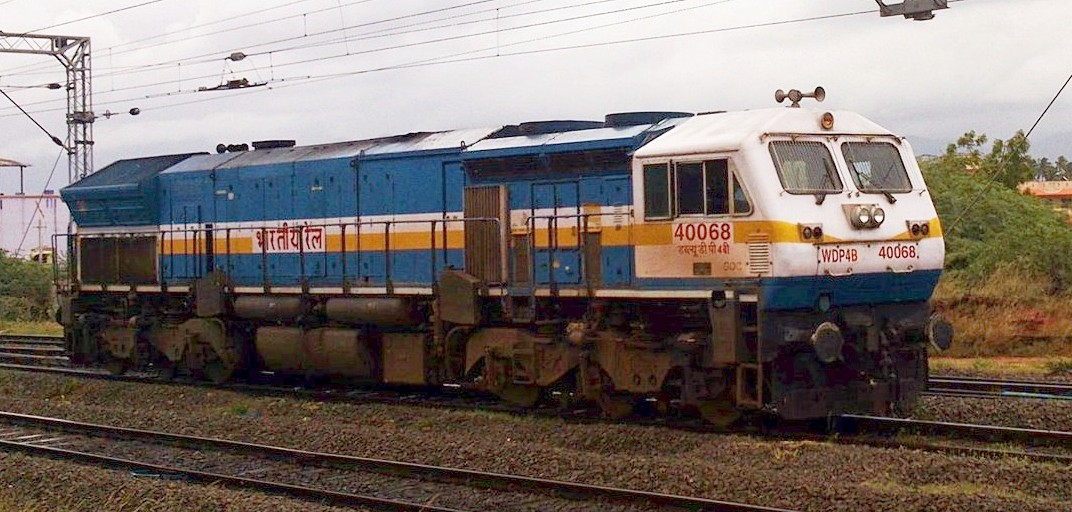
WDP4B No. 40068

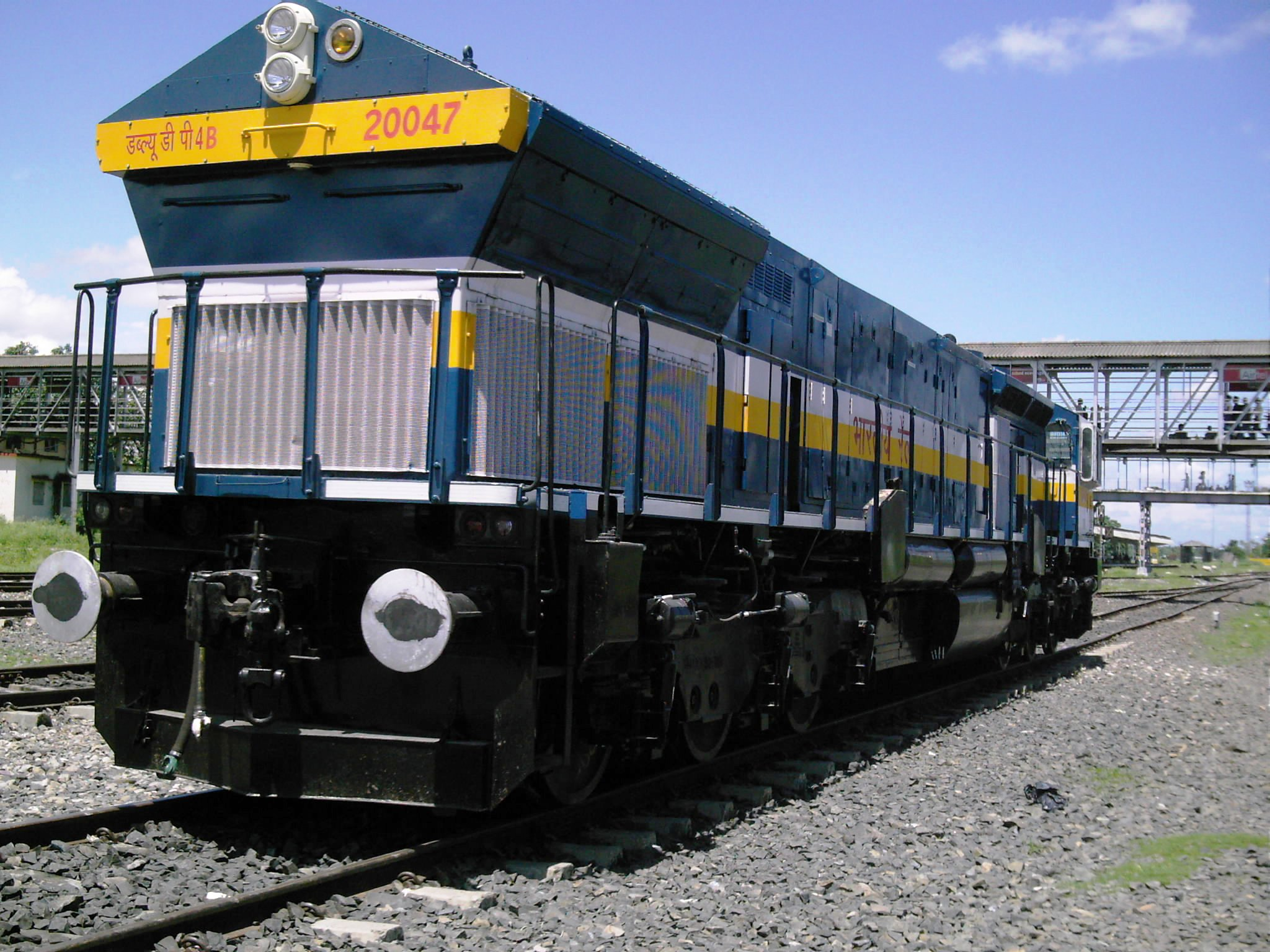
WDP4 No. 20047

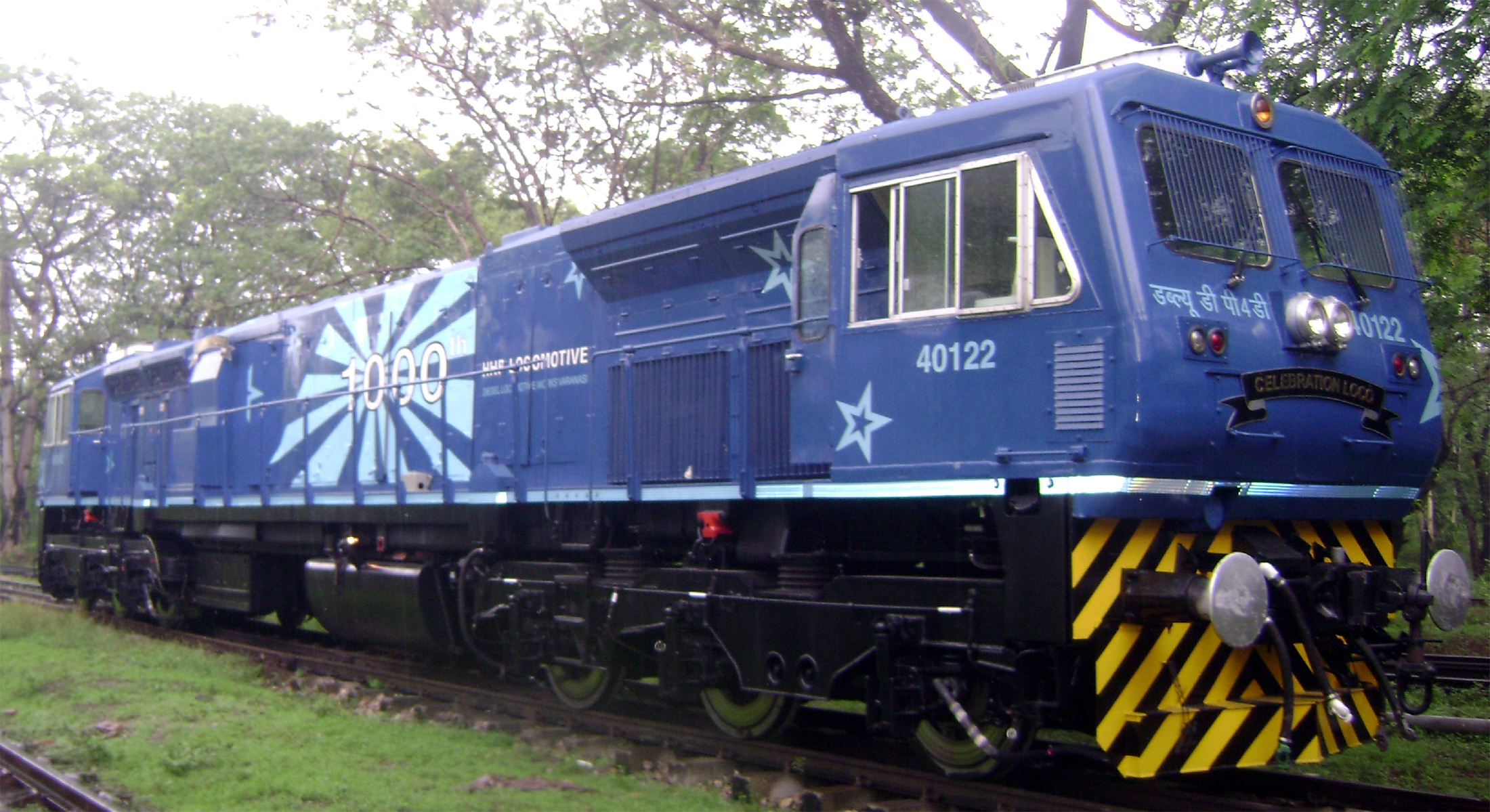
WDP4D No. 40122

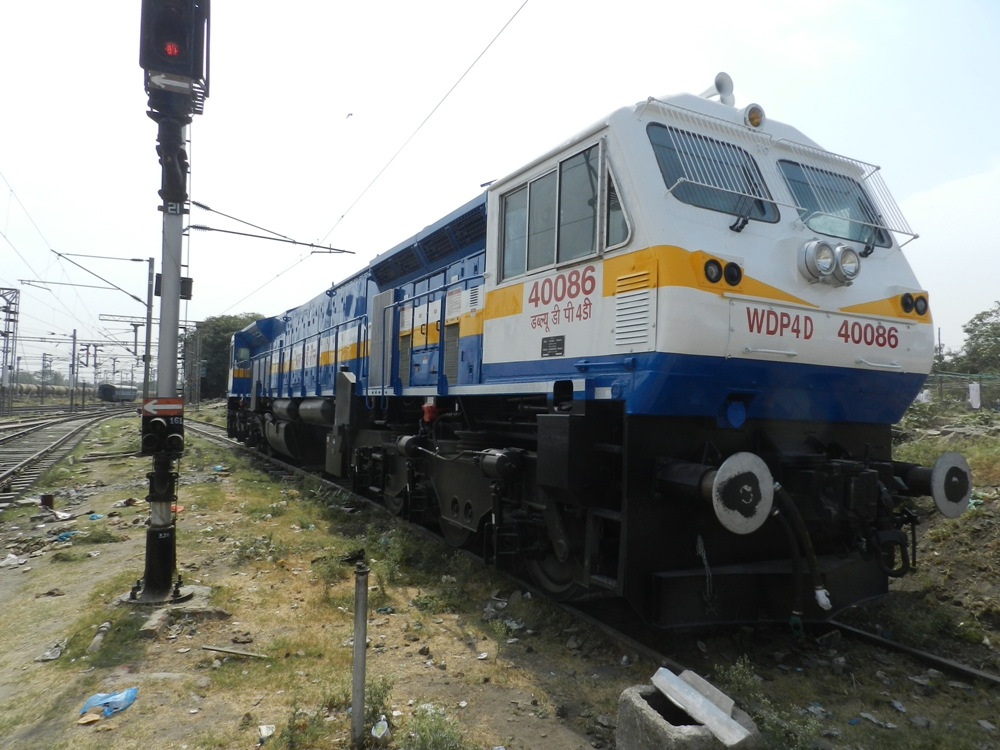
WDP4D No. 40086

== See also ==
- Indian locomotive class WDG-4
- List of diesel locomotives of India
- Indian Railways
- Rail transport in India
