= Diesel Loco Shed, Mhow =

Loco shed in Madhya Pradesh, India

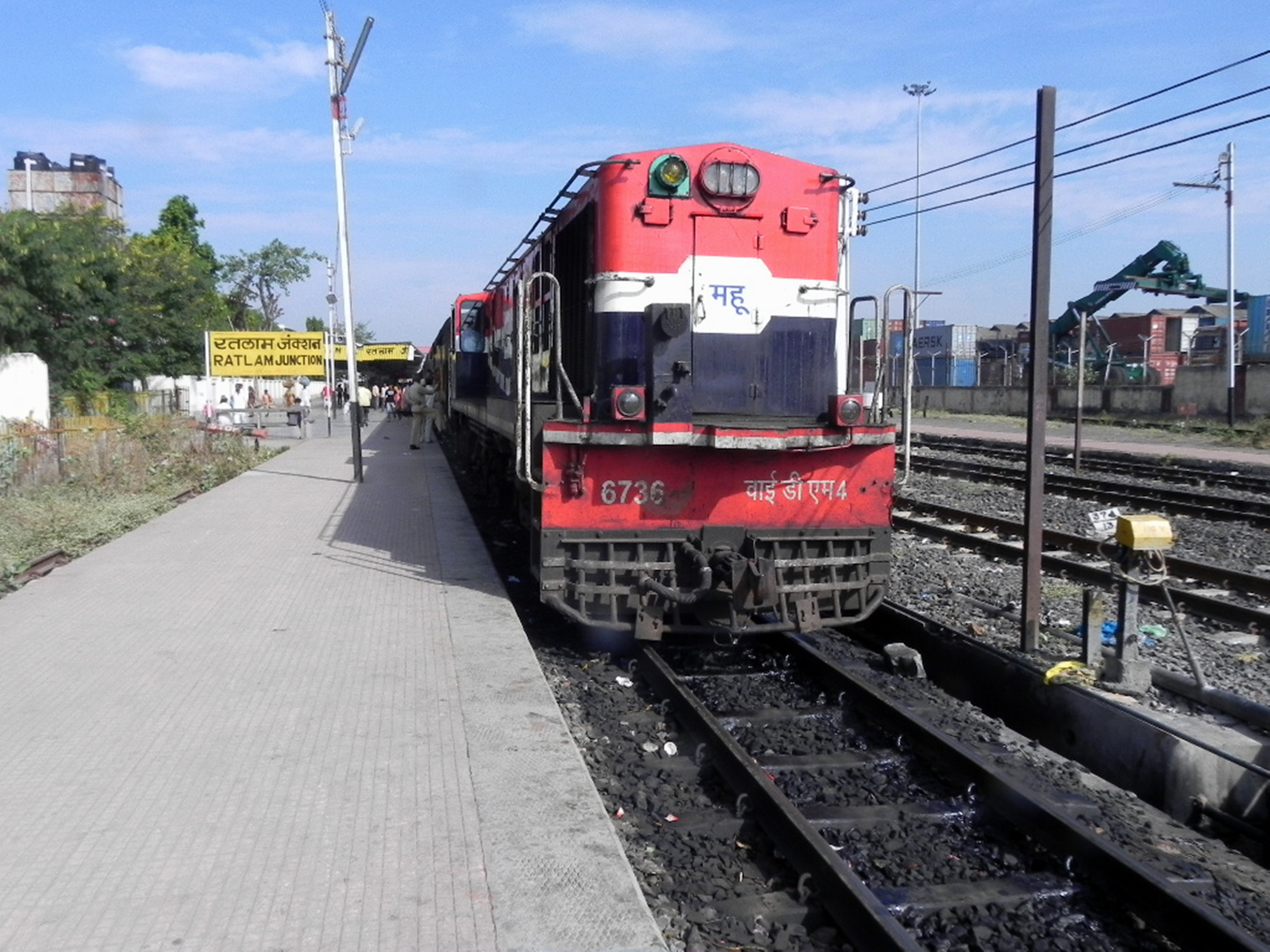
- Mhow based YDM-4 at Ratlam.
- Interactive map of Diesel Loco Shed, Mhow

Location
- Location: 22.3251°N 75.4614°E

Characteristics
- Owner: Indian Railways
- Operator: Western Railway
- Depot code: MHOW
- Type: Engine shed
- Rolling stock: YDM-4
- Routes served: Akola–Ratlam line

Diesel Loco Shed, Mhow is a metre-gauge engine shed located in Mhow, in the Indian state of Madhya Pradesh. It is located to south of Mhow railway station, it falls under the Ratlam railway division of Western Railway. It is the smallest of the three locomotive sheds in the Western Railway zone.

== History ==
When Loco Shed started 40 YDM-4s were transferred from other MG sheds to restart Loco Shed as Mhow was a steam shed till the 1998 when the steam service was withdrawn at time shed has capacity to hold hundred steam locomotives. Locos now service the isolated MG section from Akola to Indore. Currently it is home to 7 YDM-4 locomotives.

== Trains ==
=== Current ===
- Dr. Ambedkar Nagar–Sanawad Passenger

=== Former ===
- Ajmer–Hyderabad Meenakshi Express
- Mhow–Indore Passenger

== Locomotive ==
SN	Locomotive	HP	Quantity
1	YDM-4	1400	7
Total active locomotives as of June 2025			7
