= Indian locomotive class WDM-4 =

Class of diesel-electric locomotives

WDM-4
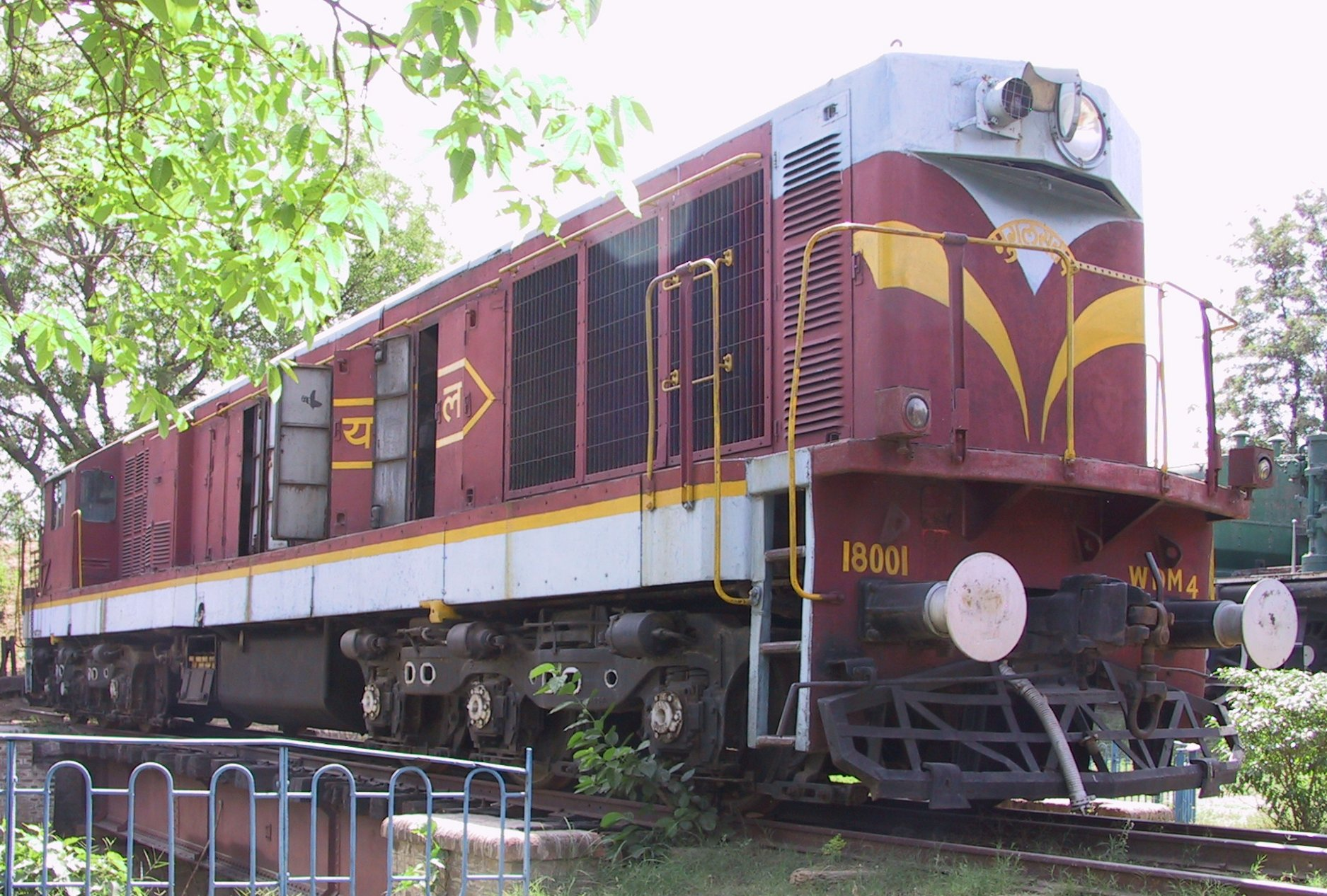
- Preserved loco at National Rail Museum, New Delhi
Type and origin
- Power type: Diesel
- Builder: Electro-Motive Diesel
- Model: EMD GT16 (based on EMD SD24)
- Build date: 1961–1962
- Total produced: 72
Specifications
- Configuration
  - UIC: Co′Co′
  - Commonwealth: Co-Co
- Gauge: 1,676 mm (5 ft 6 in)
- Bogies: Flexicoil Mark I cast steel
- Axle load: 18.8 tonnes
- Loco weight: 112,800 kg (248,700 lb)
- Fuel type: Diesel fuel
- Prime mover: EMD 16-567D3A
- Engine type: two-stroke V16 diesel
- Aspiration: Turbo-Supercharged
- Cylinders: 16
- Transmission: Diesel electric
- Train brakes: Vacuum
Performance figures
- Maximum speed: Restricted: 120 km/h (75 mph); Running: 130 km/h (81 mph); Rated: 140 km/h (87 mph); Tested: 145 km/h (90 mph)
- Power output: 2,600 hp (1,900 kW)/ 2,430 hp (1,810 kW)
- Tractive effort: 28,200 kgf (276,548 N; 62,170 lbf)
Career
- Operators: Indian Railways
- Numbers: 18000-039, 18080-18111
- Locale: Northern Railway
- Withdrawn: 2001

The Indian locomotive class WDM-4 is a class of diesel–electric locomotive that was developed in 1962 by Electro-Motive Diesel for Indian Railways. The model name stands for broad gauge (W), Diesel (D), Mixed traffic (M) engine, 4th generation (4). They entered service in 1962. A total of 72 WDM-4 locomotives were built between 1961 and 1962.

== Origin ==
The history of WDM-4 begins in the early 1960s with the stated aim of the Indian Railways to remove steam locomotives from Indian Rails after recommendation of Karnail Singh Fuel Committee. Therefore, required building a large number of Co-Co diesel locomotives producing at least 2,600 hp (1,900 kW) with road switcher cabs to achieve this aim. Thus Indian Railways began looking at various diesel-electric designs.

Initially, the Indian railways invited tenders to build locomotives to the new specification. The following responses were received:

- General Motors (EMD) submitted their SD24, given model number GT16 for the India export version. They had Co-Co bogies with 16-cylinder 2-stroke turbo-supercharged engines.
- ALCO submitted their model (RSD29 / DL560C) with 2,600 hp, 16-cylinder, 4-stroke turbo-supercharged engine with Co-Co bogies.

Each company submitted their prototypes and Indian Railways designated these prototypes as the WDM-4 class and WDM-2 class respectively. It is not known as to why Indian Railways decided to classify it as WDM-4, as no WDM-3 class existed when they were ordered. Technologically the General Motors WDM-4 was superior to ALCO WDM-2, but Indian Railways required a transfer of technology agreement that would allow these locomotives to be indigenously manufactured in India. Since General Motors did not agree to the transfer of technology agreement, the ALCO prototype was selected for production.

However, even before the arrival of WDM-4 another type of diesel locomotive was imported from ALCO in 1957. This locomotive was classified as WDM-1. However, WDM-1s were not selected for mass production because of having only one forward cab at one end, necessitating turntables for the driver's field of view.

== Service history ==
The WDM-4 locomotives were capable of hauling both freight and passenger trains, however they were primarily used on passenger service. The WDM-4 was India's first EMD locomotive, and a model of GT16. These were the fastest locomotives in India until the arrival of WAP-3 engines.

== See also ==
- Indian locomotive class WDM-2
- List of diesel locomotives of India
- Indian Railways
- Rail transport in India
