= Banaras Locomotive Works =

Locomotive manufacturer in India

Coordinates: 25.29227°N 82.95962°E

- Company type: Electric locomotive production unit
- Industry: Electric locomotive
- Predecessor: Diesel Locomotive Works
- Founded: 23 April 1956
- Headquarters: Varanasi, Uttar Pradesh, India
- Key people: Basudev Panda
- Products: WAP-7; WAG-9
- Owner: Indian Railways

The Banaras Locomotive Works (BLW), formerly Diesel Locomotive Works (DLW), is an Indian state-owned production unit of Indian Railways situated in Varanasi, Uttar Pradesh. DLW was renamed BLW in 2020.

== History ==
Founded in 1956 as the DLW, it manufactured locomotives which are variants based on the original ALCO-built WDM-2. Since 2002, it started the manufacture of EMD 710 based high horsepower (4000 HP+) locomotives - The WDG-4 (EMD GT46MAC), WDP-4 (EMD GT46PAC), and its variants. In July 2006, it outsourced manufacture of some locomotives to Parel Workshop, Central Railway, Mumbai. DLW was renamed BLW in October 2020.. In 2012, it built a locomotive powered by the 20-cylinder 710 engine (based on the EMD SD80MAC). This locomotive would be the 5500 HP WDG-5 (EMD GT50AC)

In March 2019, it developed the country's first bi-mode locomotive, the WDAP-5. BLW today produces primarily the electric locomotives WAP-7 & WAG-9.

== Market ==
Besides the Indian Railways, BLW regularly exports locomotives to other countries such as Bangladesh, Sri Lanka, Nepal, Mali, Senegal, Tanzania, Angola, Mozambique, and Vietnam and also to a few users within India, such as ports, large power and steel plants and private railways.

== Products ==
- Electric locomotives

Name	Wheel Arr	Built year(s)	Power	Current Status
WAP-7	Co-Co	2000–present	6350 HP	In service
WAG-9	Co-Co	1996–present	6125 HP	In service

== See also ==
- Chittaranjan Locomotive Works, Asansol
- Patiala Locomotive Works, Patiala
- Diesel Locomotive Factory, Marhowrah
- Electric Locomotive Factory, Madhepura
- Integral Coach Factory, Chennai
- Modern Coach Factory, Raebareli
- Rail Coach Factory, Kapurthala
- Rail Wheel Factory, Yelahanka
- Rail Wheel Plant, Bela
- Titagarh Wagons, Titagarh
- List of locomotive builders by countries
