= Indian locomotive class WDM-2G =

WDM-2G
Type and origin
- Power type: Diesel–electric
- Builder: Patiala Locomotive Works, Patiala
- Build date: 2013
- Total produced: 2
Specifications
- Configuration
  - UIC: Co′Co′
  - Commonwealth: Co-Co
- Gauge: 1,676 mm (5 ft 6 in)
- Bogies: ALCo high adhesion bogie
- Wheel diameter: 1,092 mm (3 ft 7 in)
- Axle load: 19.5 t (21.5 short tons; 19.2 LT)
- Loco weight: 117 t (129 short tons; 115 LT)
- Fuel type: Diesel
- Prime mover: 3 of Cummins QSK-19
- Engine type: 3 engines; each of 4-Cycle 6-Cyl diesel engine
- Aspiration: Turbo-supercharged
- Traction motors: TM4907 DC traction motors (6; 3 on each bogie)
- Cylinders: 6 for each engine, 3 engines
- Transmission: Diesel–electric transmission
- MU working: possible
- Loco brake: Air, Dynamic brake, Parking brake
- Train brakes: Air (IRAB-1; Indian Railway Air Brake - 1)
- Safety systems: Vigilance Control device (VCD), emergency brake control valve, flasher (one both ends)
Performance figures
- Maximum speed: mainline : 120 km/h (75 mph); other : 105 km/h (65 mph)
- Power output: 2,400 hp (1,800 kW)
- Tractive effort: 37.2 t (37,200 kg)
- Factor of adh.: 0.27
- Brakeforce: 19 t (19,000 kg) for dynamic brakes
Career
- Operators: Indian Railways
- Numbers: 80000 & 80001
- Locale: Western Railways
- Delivered: 2013
- First run: 2012
- Disposition: active

The WDM-2G is a class of diesel electric genset locomotive used in Indian Railways. It is one of the rarest locomotives in India with only two units being produced by Patiala Locomotive Works (PLW). The locomotives were produced with an intention of being fuel efficient and to be used for light to medium duties such as short passenger runs along with occasional shunting. They are one of the only two classes of locomotives in India to feature multiple prime movers, the other example being WDS-6G, which was designed solely for shunting. They have a rated power of 2,400 HP.

== Development ==
Diesel locomotives had been the backbone of the Indian Railways. Within the diesel fleet, the ALCOs, WDM-2, later upgraded to WDM-3A and other variants, were, and to some extent even continue to be, the major workhorses. This was before the, relatively recent, push of the Railways for complete electrification of the network. Being the major user of diesel locomotives, naturally, a large chunk of railway money was spent to afford diesel fuel, of which the railways were the number one consumer. Thus, with an aim to minimize pollution and fuel consumption, the development for WDM-2G, locos started. The specifications laid down by RDSO demanded the locomotive to be fuel efficient by using multiple engines (prime movers) which could be turned off or on depending on the load that the locomotive was pulling.

It was planned that the initial two locomotives would be produced by Diesel-Loco Modernization Works, Patiala (DLMW) while the remaining units would be built at a factory in Sherpur of Sehore district. The factory was supposed to be a joint a venture between Daulat Ram Engineering Services, a railway component manufacturer, and US-based locomotive re-manufacturer National Railway Equipment Co. However, further reports about the plant have not been published and information has been scarce.

== Performance and specifications ==
The WDM-2G are inspired by the hundreds of gensets in service over North America. Being the first locomotives to be built by Diesel-Loco Modernization Works, they have certain features which are not found on regular locomotives in Indian Railways such as extensive use of marker and indication lamps and a cab structure inspired by the ones found on American locomotives like EMD SD40-2. The locos, for the first time in India, featured a Nathan K5LA multi-chime horn, which proved to be a little quieter for Indian operations.

On the inside, the locomotive features 3 prime movers, each of Cummins QSK-19 type which is a 6 cylinder four stroke engine producing a power of 800 HP. The locomotive retained the ALCO high adhesion bogie from the WDM-2/3 locomotives but was moving by TM4907 for each axle which are a type of direct current traction motor. The locomotive has a weight of 117 tons distributed over 6 axles making an axle load of 19.5 tons/axle. The low weight limited the tractive effort to 37.2 tons force while allowing a speed up to 120kmph. Apart from that, the locomotives have dynamic braking, conventional braking and vigilance control device for driver alertness and safety.

The major advantage of these locomotives operationally offer is the reduced fuel consumption and lower emission. They reportedly consume 20% lesser fuel than locomotives of same specifications and power in the Railways. This also means that the resultant nitrous oxides emission is lesser in these locos making them more environmentally friendly than the previous diesel locomotives of Indian Railways.

== Service and future ==
Two locomotives numbered 80000 and 80001 entered service in 2013 after RDSO oscillation trials which certified them to be fit for 120 kilometres per hour (75 mph) on mainline tracks and 105 kilometres per hour (65 mph) on regular tracks. The locomotives were initially allocated to Itarsi (ET) loco shed of West Central Railway, however, in 2019, they were moved to Diesel loco shed Vatva (VTA) of Western Railway where they are currently used for shunting purposes.

Despite the initial fanfare within the media, the locomotive did not enter serial production for Indian Railways. The major reasons for its failure can be attributed to the fact that the requirement of low powered locomotives has become quite low due to the long and heavy trains run in the country, the exception being shunting duties, for which plenty locos are available. The chief reason why production was not continued was due to the persuasion of route electrification in Indian Railways. Due to this the Indian Railways was not very keen on adding a whole new fleet of diesel locomotives, which even after being fuel efficient for a diesel, were still inferior to the electric locomotives, both in efficiency and power.

== Locomotive shed ==
The only two units ever built were allocated to Itarsi locomotive shed before being transferred to Vatva shed, Western Railway.

Zone	Name	Shed Code	Quantity
Western Railway	Sabarmati	SBI	2
Total Locomotives Active as of April 2023			2

== See also ==
- Rail transport in India § History
- List of diesel locomotives of India
- Rail transport in India
- Indian locomotive class WDM-2, a locomotive of the same series
