= Indian locomotive class WAP-7 =

Indian Railway passenger class electric locomotive

WAP-7
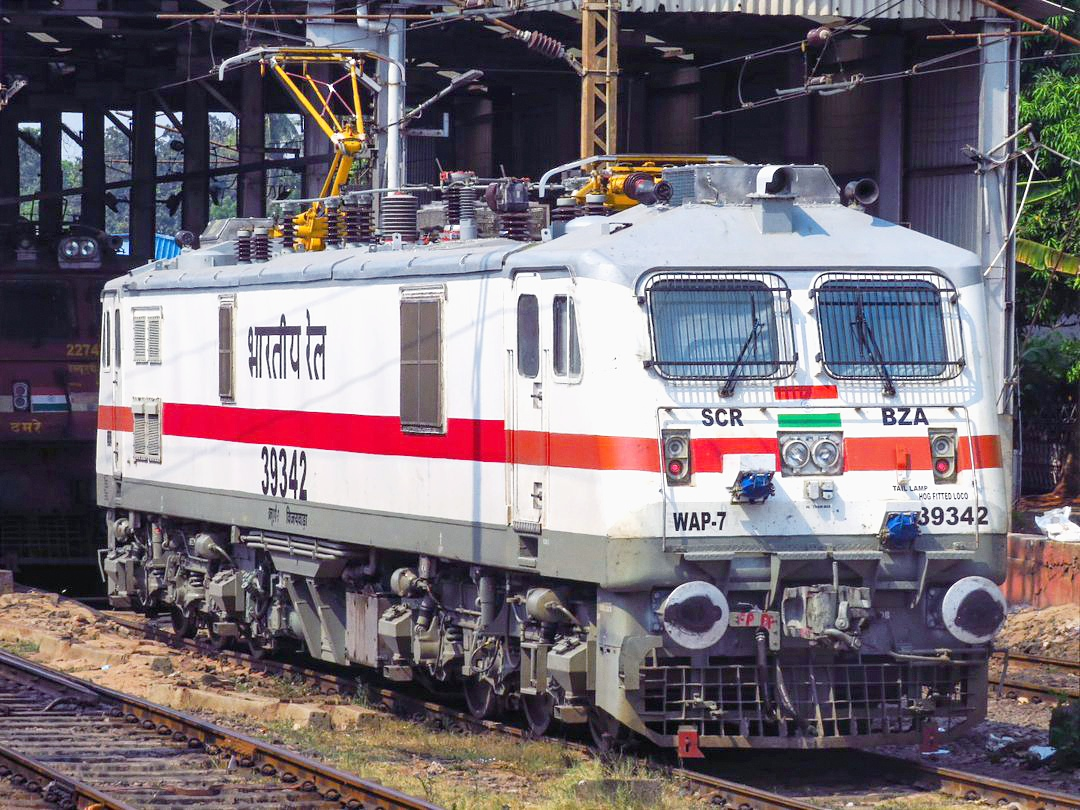
- A Vijayawada based WAP-7 at BZA ELS.
Type and origin
- Power type: Electric
- Builder: Chittaranjan Locomotive Works, Banaras Locomotive Works, Patiala Locomotive Works
- Build date: 1999–2023 (CLW) 2016–present (BLW) 2017–present (PLW)
- Total produced: 2425 as of November 2026
Specifications
- Gauge: 5 ft 6 in (1,676 mm)
- Bogies: Co-Co, Fabricated Flexicoil Mark IV bogies; bogie wheelbase 1,850 mm (72 7/8 in) + 1,850 mm (72 7/8 in)
- Wheel diameter: 1,092 mm (43 in) new, 1,016 mm (40 in) worn
- Wheelbase: 15,700 mm (51 ft 6 1/8 in)
- Length
  - Over beams: 20,562 mm (67 ft 5 1/2 in)
- Width: 3,152 mm (10 ft 4 1/8 in)
- Height
  - Pantograph: 4,255 mm (13 ft 11 1/2 in)
- Axle load: WAP 7 20.5 t (20.2 long tons; 22.6 short tons) WAP 7HS 18.08 t (17.79 long tons; 19.93 short tons) WAP 7AD 20.5 t (20.2 long tons; 22.6 short tons)
- Loco weight: 123 t (121 long tons; 136 short tons)
- Power supply: 3-phase 2180 V 50 Hz
- Electric system/s: 25 kV 50 Hz AC Overhead
- Current pickup: Pantograph
- Traction motors: 6FRA 6068 3-phase squirrel-cage induction motors 850 kW (1,140 hp), 2180 V, 1283/2484 rpm, 270/310A; Weight-2,100 kg (4,600 lb), forced-air ventilation, axle-hung, nose-suspended; Torque 6,330–7,140 N⋅m (4,670–5,270 lbf⋅ft); ~88% efficiency.
- Transmission: Electric
- Gear ratio: WAP 7; 72:20; WAP 7HS; 70:22; WAP 7AD; 175:20
- Loco brake: Air and regenerative
- Train brakes: Air
Performance figures
- Maximum speed: 140 km/h (87 mph) (WAP-7) 160 km/h (99 mph) (WAP-7HS) 180 km/h (110 mph) (WAP-7AD) Potential speed: 200 km/h (120 mph) (WAP-7AD) 180 km/h (110 mph) (WAP-7HS) 155 km/h (96 mph) (WAP-7)
- Power output: Max Power : 6,350 hp (4,740 kW); Continuous: 6,120 hp (4,563.68 kW)
- Tractive effort: Starting: 322.4 kN (72,500 lbf); Continuous: 228 kN (51,000 lbf) at 71 km/h
Career
- Operators: Indian Railways
- Numbers: 30201-30829 CLW; 37001-37999 & 45000+ BLW; 39000+ PLW
- Locale: All over India
- First run: 19 May 2000

The Indian locomotive class WAP-7 is a class of 25 kV AC electric locomotives that was developed in 1999 by Chittaranjan Locomotive Works (CLW) for Indian Railways. Its class designation denotes a broad gauge (W) alternating current (A) passenger (P) locomotive of the 7th generation (7). They entered service in 2000. WAP-7 locomotives are being built at CLW, Banaras Locomotive Works (BLW) and Patiala Locomotive Works (PLW).

The WAP-7 has been serving passengers for Indian Railways since their introduction in 1999. It is a passenger variant of the WAG-9 freight locomotive with a modified gear ratio to pull lighter loads at higher speeds. With an output of 6,125 hp, it is the most powerful passenger locomotive in the Indian Railways fleet, and the most numerous passenger locomotive in India. The WAP-7 is capable of hauling 24 coach trains at speeds of 130 km/h.

== History ==
The WAP-7 is largely used by most regional zones of Indian Railways. As of October 2021, all of these are fitted with H-type transition couplers which are compatible with both screw coupling and centre-buffer coupling. In February 2017, Banaras Locomotive Works built their first WAP 7 class locomotive.

In 2019, a variant of the WAP-7, designated the WAP-7HS, was introduced for higher speeds. The WAP-7HS has a max speed of 180 km/h (110 mph), and is capable of hauling a 24-car train at 160 km/h (99 mph) as opposed to the 140 km/h (87 mph) of the original. Indian Railways plans to use the WAP-7HS for Shatabdi, Rajdhani, and Duronto express trains. However, as of September 2022, it has not been confirmed if any others have been built, and the single completed WAP-7HS has remained restricted to 130 km/h (81 mph) operation.

In 2025, a variant of the WAP-7, designated the WAP-7AD, was introduced with an aerodynamic design. The WAP-7AD has a maximum speed of 180 km/h (110 mph), and is capable of hauling a 24-car train at 160 km/h (99 mph), as opposed to the 140 km/h (87 mph) of the original. Indian Railways plans to use the WAP-7AD for Amrit Bharat Express and other Express trains. The first WAP-7AD 37873 entered service in September 2025 hauling 12284 Ernakulam Duronto express. A pair of WAP-7AD, painted with Amrit Bharat livery are currently parked at ICF, Chennai waiting for rake and route allotment.

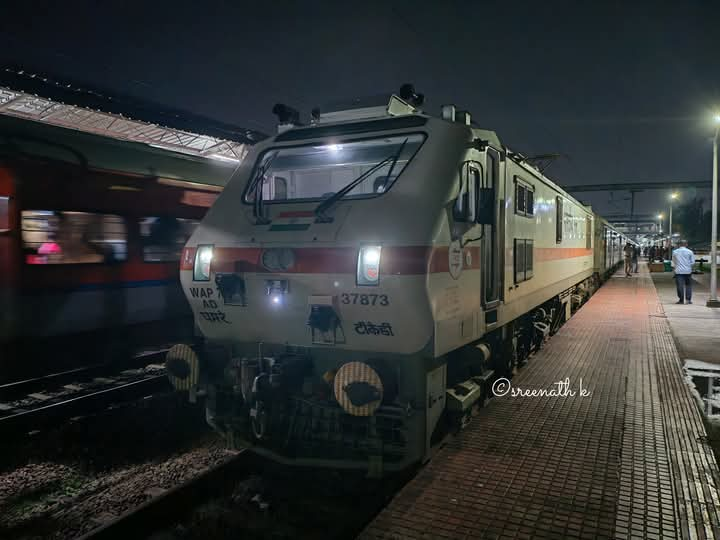
A Tughlakabad based WAP-7AD #37873 at Thrissur.

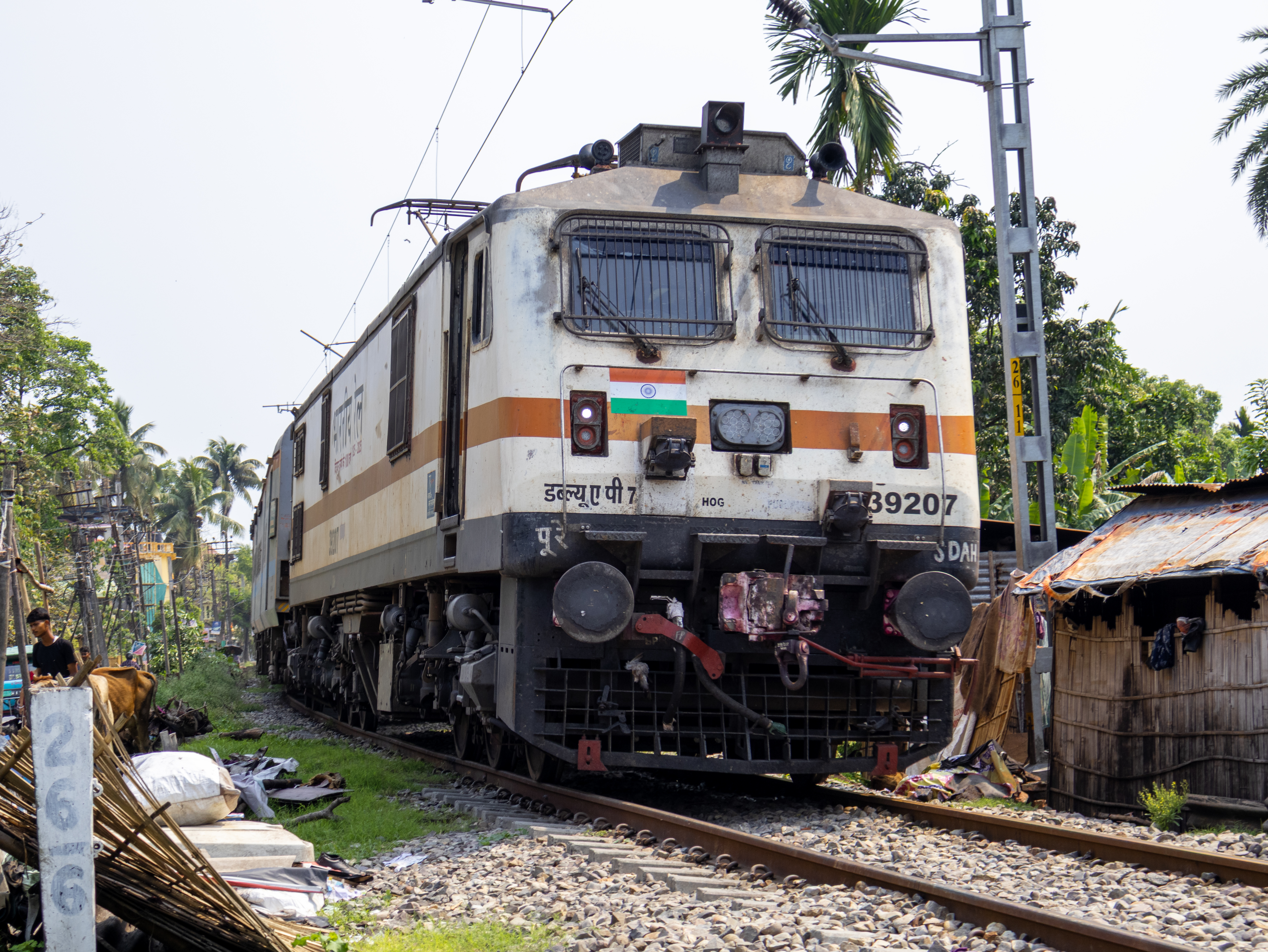
A Sealdah based WAP-7 #39207 pulling Uttar Banga Express.

== Head-on Generation (HOG) ==
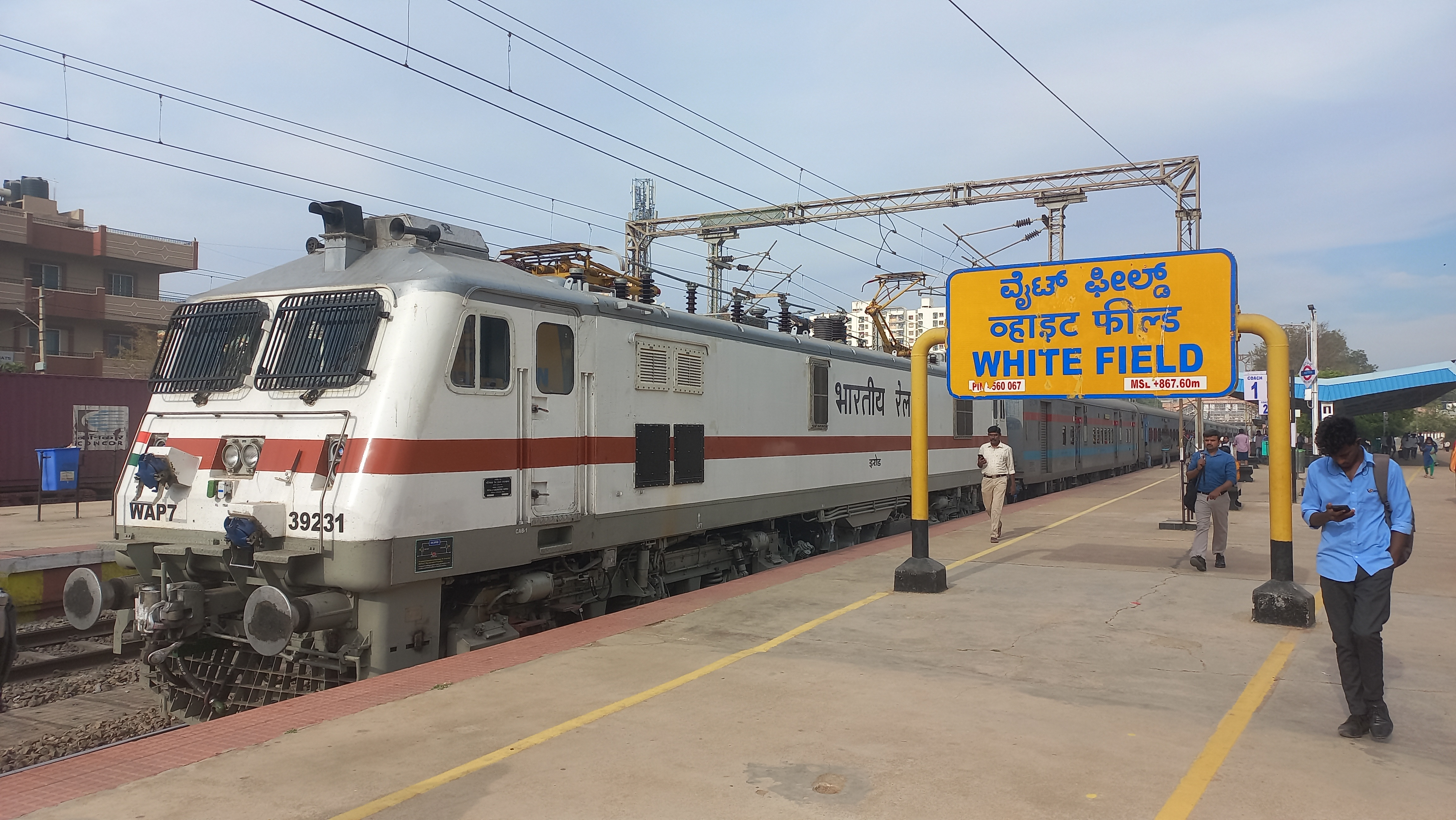
The HOG ports are equipped on loco's right side upper and left side down on Erode based WAP-7 at White Field railway station (Bengaluru).

Many locomotives of this class are fitted with head-on generation (HOG), eliminating the need for separate End-on Generation (EOG) sets or DG (Diesel Generator) sets to supply power to the train, thereby resulting in significant savings in maintenance and operating costs. HOG transfers electric power from the locomotive's pantograph to the coaches, unlike EOG, in which a power car equipped with a diesel generator capable of generating sufficient three-phase 50 Hz 415 V / 750 V AC (called 'head-end power') is provided at either end of the train rake to supply power.

== Locomotive sheds ==
Zone	Name	Shed Code	Quantity		Introduction Year
Zone	Name	Shed Code	WAP-7	WAP-7AB	Introduction Year
Central Railway	Ajni	AQE	73		2010
Central Railway	Kalyan	KYNE	87	4	2019
Central Railway	Pune	PADX	69	2	2023
Eastern Railway	Howrah	HWHE	110		2012
Eastern Railway	Sealdah	SDAD	50		2020
East Central Railway	Gomoh	GMOE	49	6	2000
East Central Railway	Barauni	BJUE	6		2021
East Central Railway	Samastipur	SPJD	57	6	2022
East Coast Railway	Angul	ANGE	3		2026
Northern Railway	Ghaziabad	GZBE	165		2000
Northern Railway	Ludhiana	LDHE	44		2022
North Central Railway	Kanpur	CNBE	110	4	2019
North Eastern Railway	Gonda	GDDE	20		2021
North Eastern Railway	Gorakhpur	GKPL	23	8	2024
North Eastern Railway	Izzatnagar	IZNE	11		2024
Northeast Frontier Railway	Siliguri	SGUD	55		2024
Northeast Frontier Railway	New Guwahati	NGCD	82	8	2026
North Western Railway	Bhagat Ki Kothi	BGKD	88	14	2023
Southern Railway	Erode	EDE	111	6	2017
Southern Railway	Royapuram	RPME	126	2	2011
Southern Railway	Arakkonam	AJJE	1		2026
South Central Railway	Lallaguda	LGDE	163		2008
South Coast Railway	Visakhapatnam	WATE	90		2016
South Coast Railway	Vijayawada	BZAE	85		2021
South Eastern Railway	Tatanagar	TATE	54		2017
South Eastern Railway	Bondamunda	BNDL	19		2018
South Eastern Railway	Santragachi	SRCE	54		2017
South East Central Railway	Bhilai	BIAE	26		2012
South Western Railway	Krishnarajapuram	KJMD	95	4	2019
South Western Railway	Hubballi	UBLD	36		2024
Western Railway	Vadodara	BRCE	131		2016
Western Railway	Valsad	BLEE	92		2024
Western Railway	Sabarmati	SBTD	9		2026
West Central Railway	Tughlakabad	TKDE	76		2013
West Central Railway	Itarsi	ETE	101		2018
Total			2371	64	
Total Locomotives Active as of November 2026			2435		

== See also ==
- Indian Railways
- Locomotives of India
- Rail transport in India
