= Indian locomotive class WAG-9 =

Indian Railway freight class electric locomotive

WAG-9
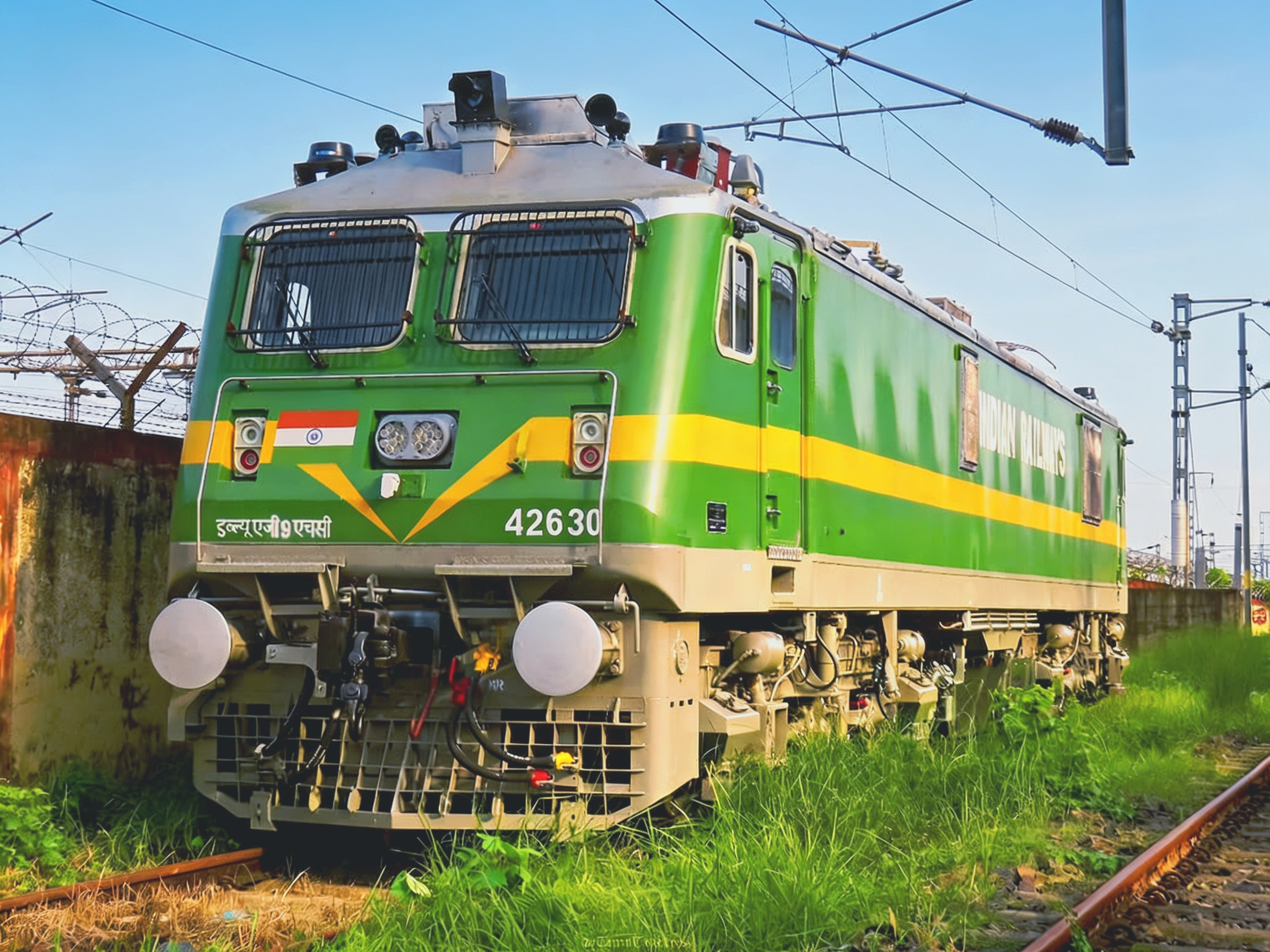
- Freshly made WAG-9HC #42630 at Dankuni yard.
Type and origin
- Power type: Electric
- Builder: Chittaranjan Locomotive Works, Bharat Heavy Electricals Limited, Banaras Locomotive Works, Patiala Locomotive Works
- Build date: 1995–present
- Total produced: 7999 as of November 2026
Specifications
- Configuration
  - UIC: Co′Co′
- Gauge: 5 ft 6 in (1,676 mm)
- Bogies: Adtranz Fabricated Flexicoil IV
- Wheel diameter: New: 1,092 mm (3 ft 7 in), Half worn: 1,054 mm (3 ft 5 1/2 in); Full worn: 1,016 mm (3 ft 4 in)
- Wheelbase: 15.7 m (51 ft 6 in)
- Length: 20.562 m (67 ft 5 1/2 in)
- Width: 3.152 m (10 ft 4 1/8 in)
- Height: 4.525 m (14 ft 10 1/8 in)
- Axle load: WAG-9 : 20.5 tonnes (20.2 long tons; 22.6 short tons) WAG-9H/Hi/9i : 22.0 tonnes (21.7 long tons; 24.3 short tons)
- Loco weight: WAG-9 : 123 tonnes (121 long tons; 136 short tons) WAG-9H/9Hi/9i/9HH : 132 tonnes (130 long tons; 146 short tons) WAG-9TWIN/EF12K: 264 tonnes (260 long tons; 291 short tons)
- Electric system/s: 25 kV 50 Hz AC Overhead
- Current pickup: dual pantographs
- Traction motors: WAG-9/9H/9i : Adtranz 6FRA6068
- Gear ratio: 1 : 5.133
- MU working: 2
- Loco brake: Air and Regenerative
- Train brakes: Air
- Safety systems: Slip/slide control, Main overload relay, Over voltage relay, No volt protection, Vigilance Control Device, Fire Detection Equipment, Fire Extinguishers and Earth fault relay
Performance figures
- Maximum speed: 100 km/h (62 mph)
- Power output: WAG-9 Original : 6,120 hp (4,564 kW) WAG-9HC : 6,120 hp (4,564 kW) WAG-9HH/EF9K : 9,000 hp (6,711 kW) WAG-9TWIN/EF12K : 12,000 hp (8,948 kW)
- Tractive effort: WAG-9 Starting Effort : 475 kN (107,000 lb_{f}) WAG-9H/HH Starting Effort : 510 kN (110,000 lb_{f}) WAG-9TWIN Starting Effort:1,040 kN (230,000 lb_{f})
Career
- Operators: Indian Railways
- Numbers: Starting from: 31000-31999, 32000-32999, 33000-33999, 38000-38999, 51001-51058, 42300-42999, 34150+ & 65001+(A & B) unit CLW; 34001-34127 BHEL; 41000-41500, 43000-43999 & 44000+ BLW; 41501-41999 & 42000+ PLW
- Locale: All Over India
- Disposition: Active

The Indian locomotive class WAG-9 is a class of 25 kV AC electric locomotives that was developed in 1995 by ABB for Indian Railways. The model name stands for broad gauge (W), AC Current (A), Goods traffic (G), 9th generation (9) locomotive. They entered service in 1996. A total of 5140 WAG-9 have been built at Chittaranjan Locomotive Works (CLW), with more units being built at Banaras Locomotive Works (BLW), Bharat Heavy Electricals Limited (BHEL) and Patiala Locomotive Works (PLW). It was the most powerful freight locomotive in the Indian Railways fleet until the introduction of the WAG-12 and WAG D-9.

The WAG-9 class was built to haul freight trains. A passenger variant of the WAG-9 was developed, the WAP-7, with a modified gear ratio to pull lighter loads at higher speeds. EF9K, previously known as WAG-9HH, which has a power of 9,000 hp, has been developed. EF12K, a new evolution of the WAG-9 locomotive, has been developed with 12,000 hp.

== Introduction ==
The WAG-9 locomotive is a "Heavy Haul" freight locomotive, conceived in response to the growth in rail freight. The need for more electrification and electric locomotives in India had increased. Around 80-85% of freight transported on Indian Railways goes over electrified lines of the Golden Quadrilateral (Indian Railways) and diagonals (which account for 25% of the route). Electrical powers give it a sectional clearance ability.

These locomotives have entered the Western Railway zone of Mumbai. The first 22 units were imported from ABB. Of these, the first six were fully assembled and rest were in kit form. CLW started producing of WAG-9 traction motors on 1 November 1999. The units built by ABB have pantographs with two end horns while the CLW built units have pantographs with single end horns which are common in India. This class had a capacity to MU several units, but IR restricts them to two, because of dynamic loading restriction on most bridges. Regenerative brakes provide about 260 kN of braking effort.

The WAG-9H also has different application software than the WAG-9. The first WAG-9H was commissioned on 30 June 2000. The #30130 prototype was housed at Gomoh (GMO). This was then converted back to standard WAG-9 in 2002. This unit has a livery of twin white stripes on green, instead of yellow stripe on green, seen on the other WAG-9(x)s.

The WAG-9i was introduced in 2010, and was No. 31215. It was homed at the GMO shed. With IGBT, even if one traction motor failed, other traction motors can function with a total output of 5500 hp.

Newer WAG-9 units have "CLW Glorious 60 years" marked on their sides. Some WAG-9(x)s are fitted with a solid cowcatcher while others are fitted with grilled cowcatchers. Some have American style flasher lamps while others have Indian style flasher lamps.

Newer versions of the WAG-9 feature full Insulated-gate bipolar transistor (IGBT) traction control; the debut model was the WAG-9 31248. The class as a whole is denoted by the WAG-9i prefix in its model number, although there is a technical variant of this class named WAG-9H, with the "H" meaning "Heavy".

The WAG-9H/9Hi locomotives are the second heaviest in regular service in India (after the WAG-12), the only freight-dedicated three-phase AC locomotives in the country, and the only electric locomotives in India fitted with IGBT. They are also the freight locomotives with the highest operational speed in India.

It is similar to the WAP-7 class locomotive but features a different gear ratio, which makes it suitable for heavy freight operations. In November 1998, the Chittaranjan Locomotive Works (CLW) started producing these with indigenous components. The first of which, named Navyug (New Era), was produced on 14 November 1998. Like the WAP-5 units, the WAG-9 has GTO thyristor converters and three-phase asynchronous motors.

== Operations ==
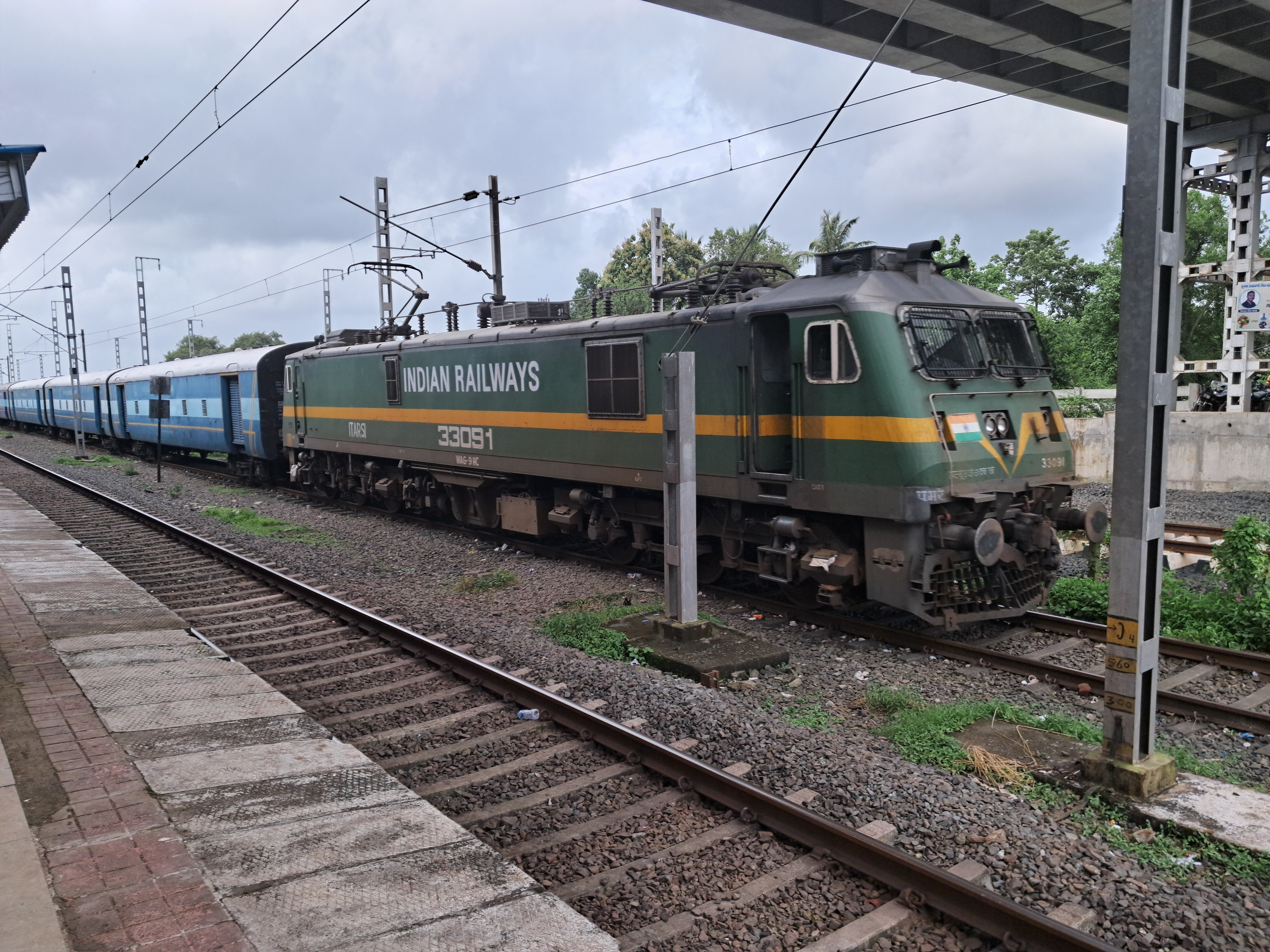
Itarsi based WAG-9HC at Vangaon railway station, pulling an automobile carrier rake.

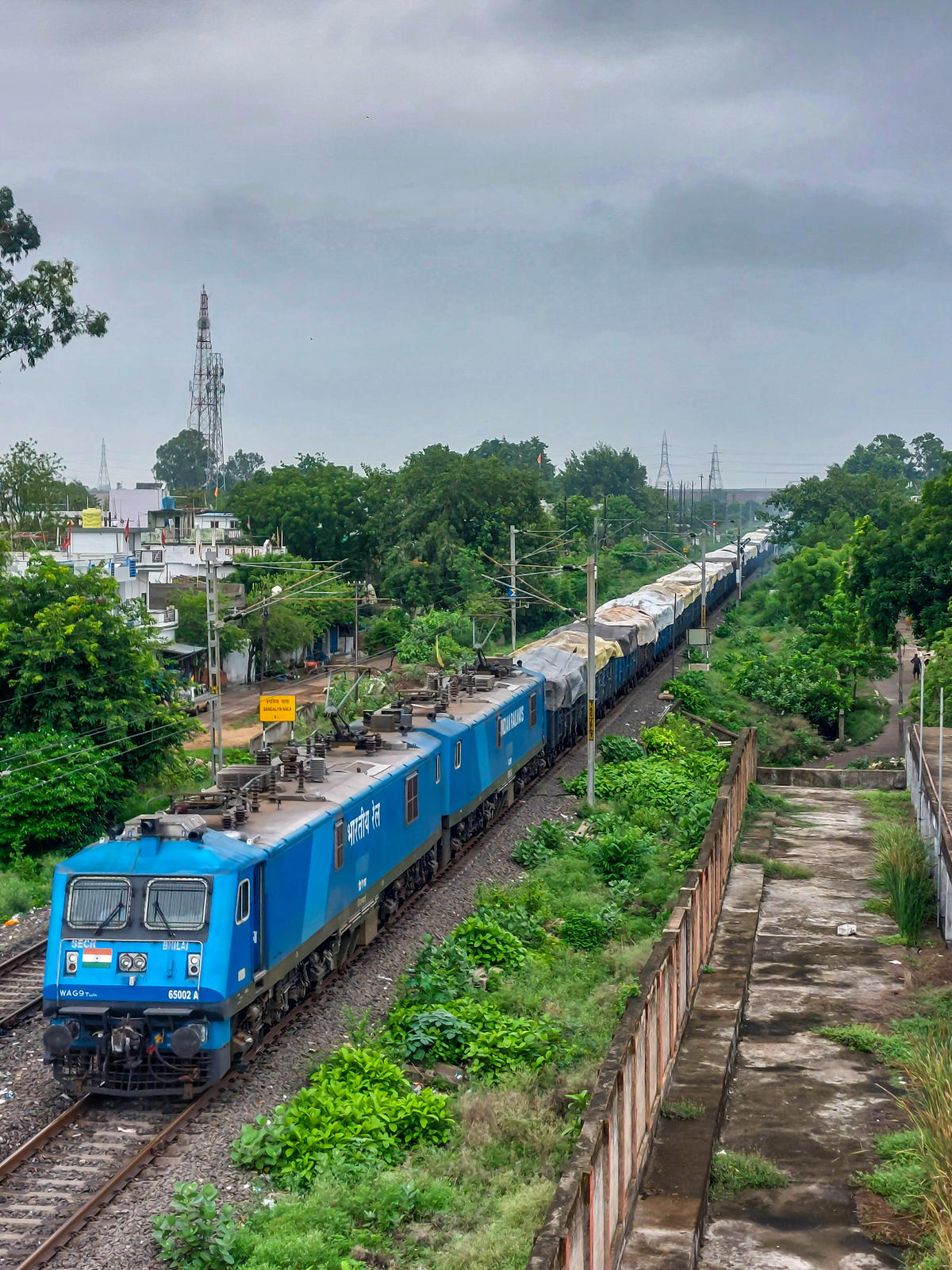
Bhilai based EF12K, previously known as WAG-9 Twins on duty

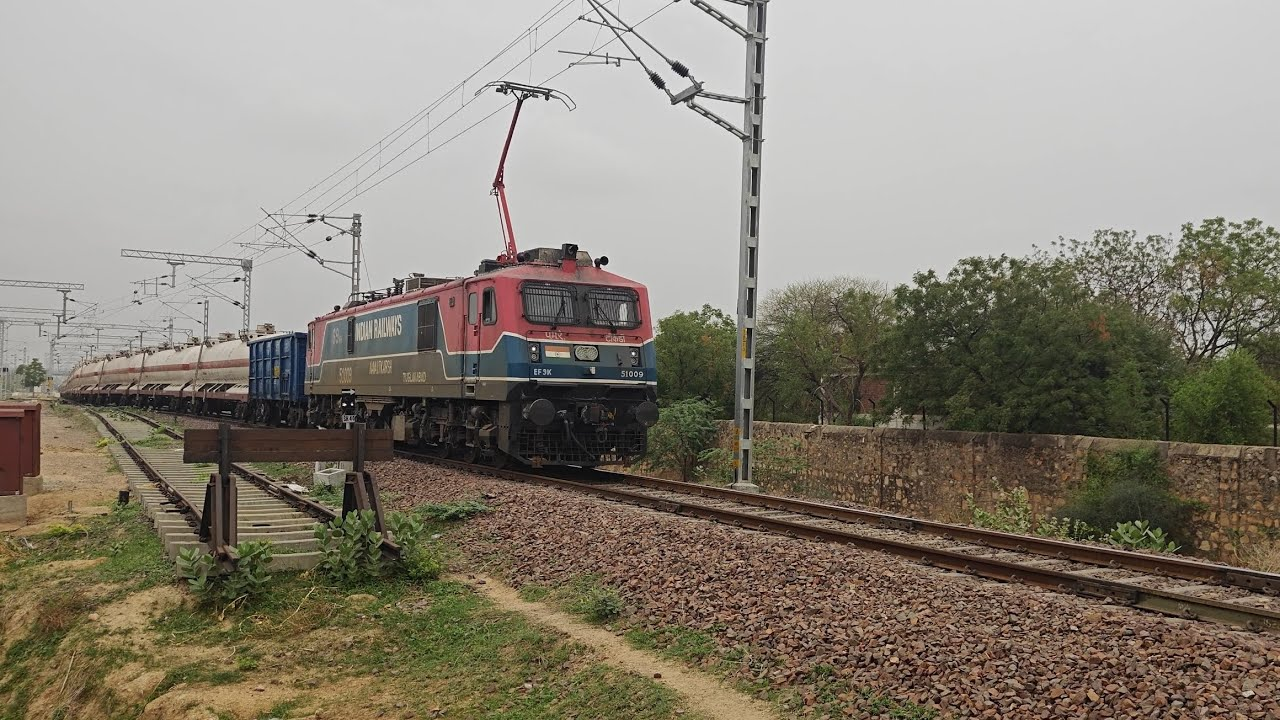
Tughlakabad based EF9K, previously known as WAG-9HH named "Nav Utkarsh" on duty.

WAG-9 has quickly become one of the important locos in the Indian railways. With its higher power, this locomotive has replaced WAG-7 which was the main electric loco before WAG-9's arrival. Applications where twin WAG-7s were required are now handled by a single WAG-9. This includes both leading a long consist and for banking operations. The regenerative braking capabilities of WAG-9 has also helped reduce the electricity consumption. The original WAG-9 had some wheel slippage incidents while hauling heavy load. This was rectified through the introduction of WAG-9H and subsequently using WAG-9i. This has significantly reduced the issues that were associated with the original version. Nowadays, it is quite common to see special passenger trains hauled by WAG-9 locomotives. Many express services, as the Ballia Express, Bhagirathi Express and many other Mail Express category trains sometimes use WAG-9 locomotives. The WAG-9 locomotive is similar to the non-HOG WAP-7.

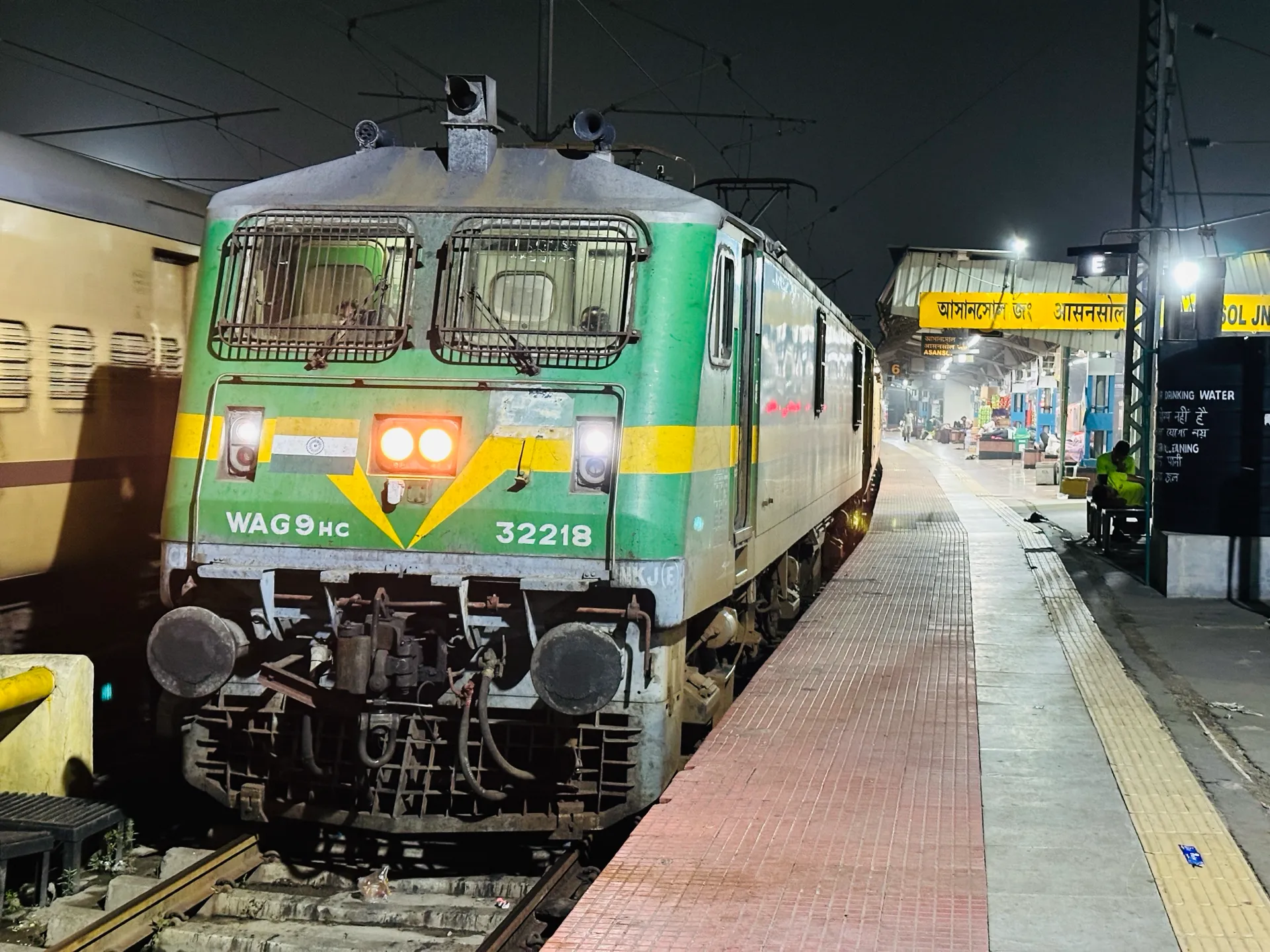
New Katni Jn. WAG-9HC hauling Asansol-Hatia Express

Chittaranjan Locomotive Works (CLW) turned out its first 9,000 hp WAG-9 freight locomotive on 31 March 2019, the last day of the financial year. This 9,000 hp version of the WAG-9H has been classified by IR as WAG-9 HH. The first H stands for higher axle load and the second H stands for the higher power rating. The class has been allocated a block of serial numbers starting with 90001, the number of the first unit. The decision to upgrade the power output of the WAG-9 was taken to partly meet the demands of the upcoming electrified Western Dedicated Freight Corridor (WDFC). The upgraded locomotive class will also augment hauling capacity on the existing network of the Indian Railways.

WAG-9 hauling LTT- Danapur Holiday special express. Spotted near Mulund

== Locomotive sheds ==
Zone	Name	Shed Code	Quantity				Introduction Year
Zone	Name	Shed Code	WAG-9	WAG-9H	EF9K	EF12K	Introduction Year
Central Railway	Bhusawal	BSLL		172			2018
Central Railway	Daund	DNDE		53			2024
Central Railway	Ajni	AQE		239			2000
Central Railway	Pune	PADX		38			2022
Central Railway	Kalyan	KYNE		2			2026
Eastern Railway	Asansol	ASNL		323			2020
Eastern Railway	Bardhaman	BWNX		56			2026
East Central Railway	Pt. Deen Dayal Upadhyaya	DDUE	2	137			2020
East Central Railway	Gomoh	GMOE	1	219			1997
East Central Railway	Barauni	BJUE		201			2019
East Central Railway	Patratu	PTRX	5	150			2020
East Coast Railway	Angul	ANGE		147			2023
Northern Railway	Ghaziabad	GZBE		35			2023
Northern Railway	Ludhiana	LDHE		228			2015
Northern Railway	Khanalampura	KJGE		164			2019
Northern Railway	Tughlakabad(D)	TKDD		116			2022
North Central Railway	Kanpur	CNBE		231			2016
North Central Railway	Jhansi	JHSE		90			2024
North Central Railway	Jhansi(D)	JHSD		38			2026
North Eastern Railway	Gonda	GDDE		106			2021
North Eastern Railway	Gorakhpur	GKPL		28			2025
North Eastern Railway	Saiyedpur Bhitri	SYHE		87			2022
North Eastern Railway	Izzatnagar	IZNE		81			2023
Northeast Frontier Railway	Malda Town	MLDT		224			2021
Northeast Frontier Railway	Siliguri	SGUD		16			2022
Northeast Frontier Railway	New Guwahati	NGCD		57			2023
North Western Railway	Bhagat Ki Kothi	BGKD		103			2023
Southern Railway	Arakkonam	AJJE		129			2020
Southern Railway	Erode	EDLS		59			2026
South Central Railway	Lallaguda	LGDE	52	95			2007
South Central Railway	Kazipet	KZJL	3	292		4	2013
South Central Railway	Moula Ali	MLYD		71			2023
South Coast Railway	Vijayawada	BZAE		99			2021
South Coast Railway	Vijayawada(D)	BZAD		31			2026
South Coast Railway	Guntakal	GTLE		16			2026
South Coast Railway	Gooty	GYD		141			2019
South Coast Railway	Visakhapatnam	WATE		229		14	2014
South Coast Railway	Visakhapatnam (D)	WATD		166			2021
South Eastern Railway	Tatanagar	TATE		225			2010
South Eastern Railway	Bondamunda	BNDL		284			2016
South Eastern Railway	Bokaro Steel City	BKSE		292			2019
South Eastern Railway	Rourkela	ROUE		305			2019
South East Central Railway	Bhilai	BIAE		272		51	2009
South East Central Railway	Raipur	RPDX		45		14	2025
South East Central Railway	Bilaspur	BSPE		216		35	2020
South Western Railway	Krishnarajapuram	KJMD		108			2020
South Western Railway	Hubballi	UBLD		142			2022
Western Railway	Vadodara	BRCE		141		2	2024
Western Railway	Valsad	BLEE		132			2020
Western Railway	Vatva	VTAD		155			2023
Western Railway	Sabarmati	SBT		34			2024
West Central Railway	Tughlakabad	TKDE	21	209	6		2008
West Central Railway	New Katni Jn.	NKJE		192	32	43	2017
West Central Railway	Itarsi	ETE		194			2020
West Central Railway	New Katni Jn.(D)	NKJD		3	21	75	2025
Total			84	7618	59	238	
Total Locomotives Active as of November 2026			7999				

== Performance ==
Two WAG-9 class units can haul a load of 4,500 tonnes (4,400 long tons; 5,000 short tons) on grades of 1 in 60 (1.67%). The WAG-9H was expected to haul 58 BOXN wagons, i.e.,4,700 tonnes (4,600 long tons; 5,200 short tons), without multiple units on grades of 1 in 150 (0.67%). The locomotive can run even in 100% humidity, or in deserts, where there is high saturation of conductive particles. For shunting up to 15 km/h (9.3 mph), it can haul 7,500 tonnes (7,400 long tons; 8,300 short tons) on grades of 1 in 1000 (0.1%) or less. The atmosphere may be humid and salty. Regenerative braking will provide braking force of no less than 260 kN (58,000 lb_{f}) at 10–62 km/h (6.2–38.5 mph) and closer to 260 kN (58,000 lb_{f}) at higher speeds. Below is the capacity of the WAG-9 while hauling BOX wagons (in tonnes):

Grade\km/h	Start	20	30	40	50	60	70	80	90	100
Level	6000+	6000+	6000+	6000+	6000+	6000+	6000+	6000+	6000+	6000+
1 in 500	6000+	6000+	6000+	6000+	6000+	6000+	6000+	4985	4150	3500
1 in 200	5060	5060	5060	5060	5060	4045	3325	2780	2365	2040
1 in 150	4250	4250	4165	4080	3985	3200	2640	2220	1895	1640
1 in 100	3205	2910	2870	2825	2775	2240	1855	1565	1345	1165
1 in 50	1820	1455	1445	1435	1420	1440	945	795	680	590

== See also ==
- Indian Railways
- Locomotives of India
- Rail transport in India
