= Diesel Loco Shed, Guntakal =

Loco shed in Andhra Pradesh, India

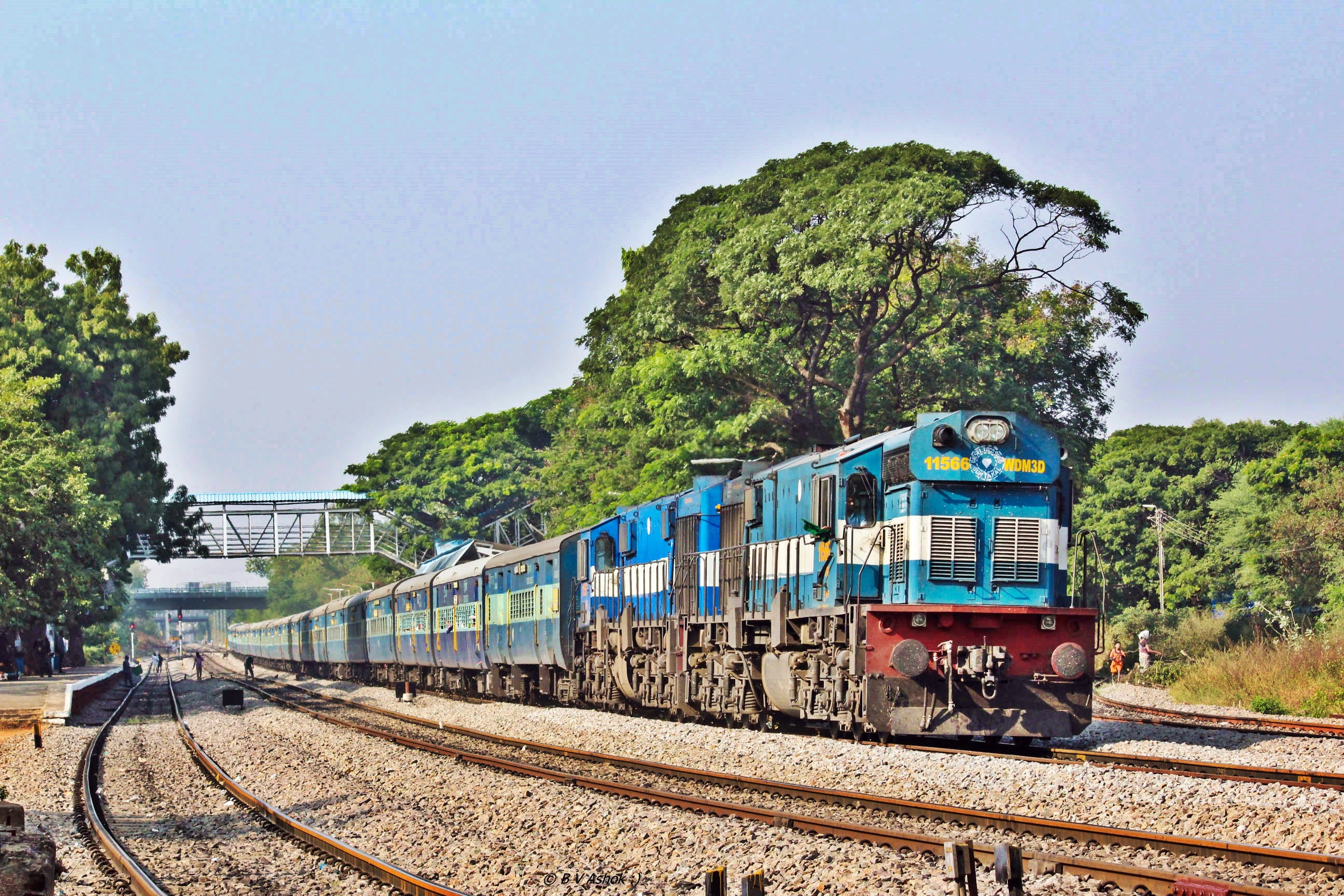
- Guntakal based WDM-3D twins

- Location within Andhra Pradesh

Location
- Location: Guntakal, Andhra Pradesh, India
- Coordinates: 15.17°N 77.38°E

Characteristics
- Owner: Indian Railways
- Operator: South Coast Railway zone
- Depot code: GTL
- Type: Engine shed
- Rolling stock: WAP-4; WAG-7; WAG-9

History
- Opened: 1964; 62 years ago
- Former rolling stock: WDM-3A, WDM-2, YDM-4, WDM-3D, WDG-3A

Diesel Loco Shed, Guntakal is an engine shed located in Guntakal, Andhra Pradesh in India. It falls under the jurisdiction of Guntakal railway division of South Coast Railway zone.

It is one of the oldest loco sheds, started in 1964 as a M.G Shed.

== Locomotives ==
Serial No.	Locomotive Class	Horsepower	Quantity
1.	WAP-4	5350	25
2.	WAG-7	5350	160
3.	WAG-9	6120	4
Total Locomotives Active as of June 2026			189
