= Electric Loco Shed, Bokaro Steel City =

Loco shed in Jharkhand, India

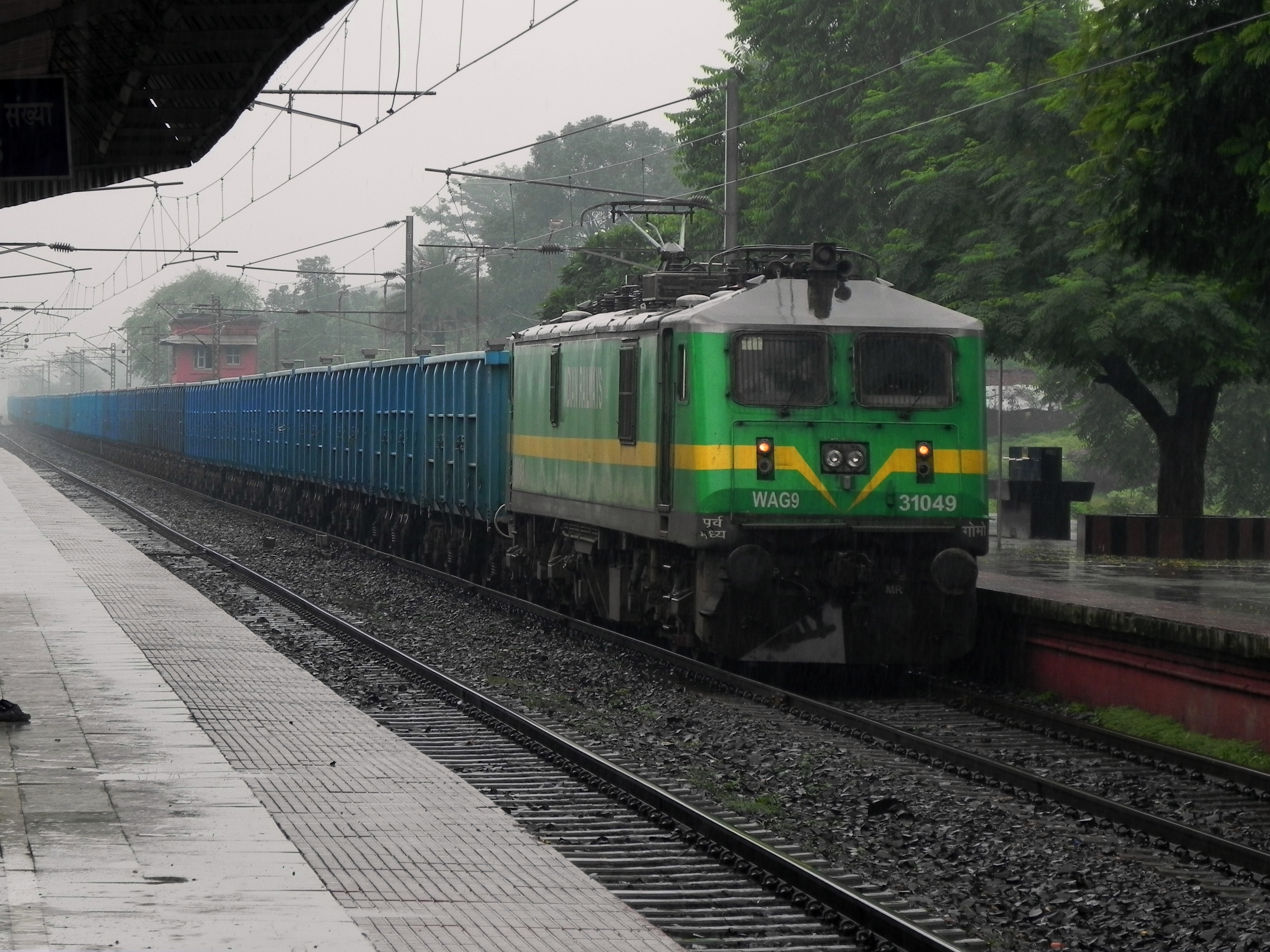
- BKSC based WAG-9H at Parasnath

- Location within Jharkhand

Location
- Location: Bokaro Steel City, Jharkhand
- Coordinates: 23°39′24″N 86°05′08″E

Characteristics
- Owner: Indian Railways
- Operator: South Eastern Railway
- Depot code: BKSC
- Type: Engine shed
- Roads: 7
- Rolling stock: WAG-9

History
- Opened: 2011; 15 years ago
- Former rolling stock: WAG-5; WAG-7

Electric Loco Shed, Bokaro Steel City is a motive power depot for electric locomotives of the Indian Railways, located in Bokaro Steel City within the South Eastern Railway zone in Jharkhand, India.

== Operations ==
As one of the electric locomotive sheds in the South Eastern Railway zone, the facility handles major and minor maintenance schedules for electric locomotives. It has a sanctioned capacity of 100 units and houses an active holding of 256 WAG-9 locomotives. Like all locomotive sheds, BKSC undertakes regular maintenance, overhauls, repairs, painting, and washing.

== Locomotives ==
Serial no.	Locomotive class	Horsepower	Quantity
1.	WAG-9	6120	256
Total locomotives active as of January 2026			256
