= Electric Loco Shed, Tughlakabad =

Loco shed in Delhi, India

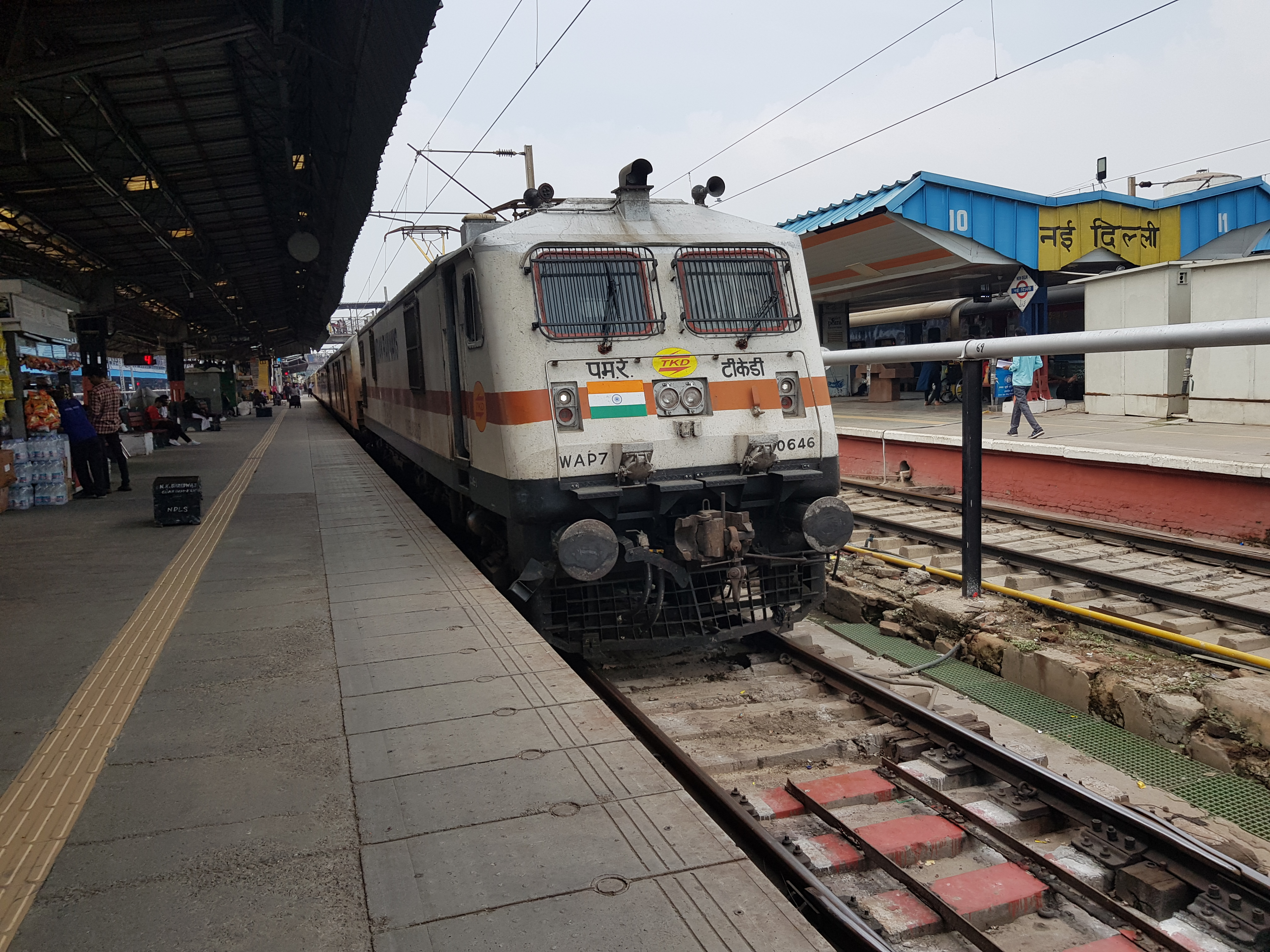
- Tughlakabad-based WAP-7 at New Delhi

- Location within Delhi

Location
- Location: Badarpur, Delhi
- Coordinates: 28.512366°N 77.290482°E

Characteristics
- Owner: Indian Railways
- Operator: West Central Railway zone
- Depot code: TKD
- Type: Engine shed
- Roads: 6
- Rolling stock: WAP-7; WAG-9; EF9K

History
- Opened: 15 June 1988; 38 years ago
- Former rolling stock: WAM-4; WAG-5; WAG-7

The Electric Loco Shed, Tughlakabad is a motive power depot performing maintenance and repair for electric locomotives of the Indian Railways. Located at Tughlakabad in Delhi and belonging to the Kota division, it is one of the three electric loco sheds under West Central Railway (along with Itarsi and New Katni), and the only one located within Northern Railway territory.

== History ==
The Tughlakabad loco shed was commissioned on 15 June 1988 with an initial holding of 100 locomotives.

== Livery and markings ==
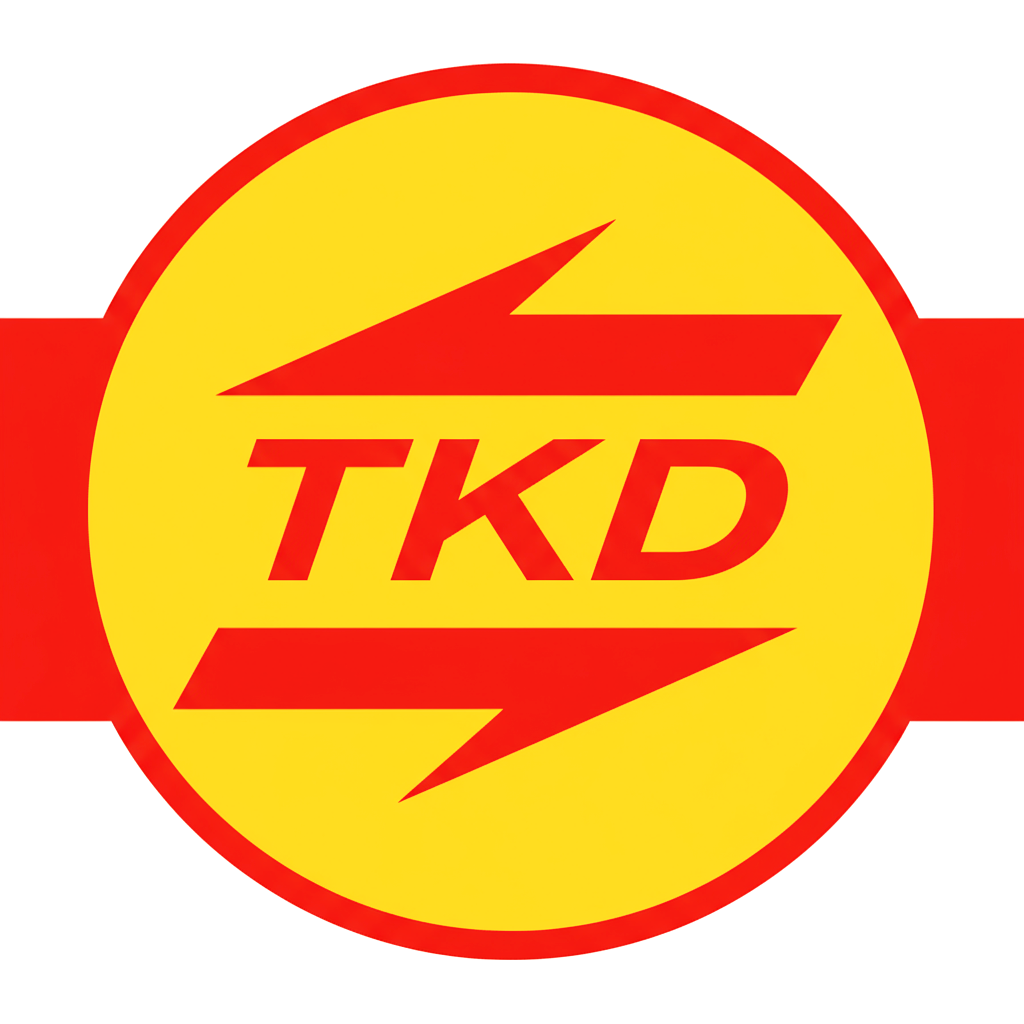
Logo of Electric Loco Shed, Tughlakabad

Tughlakabad ELS has its own logo and stencils. It is written on loco's body side as well as front and back side.

== Locomotives ==
Serial no.	Locomotive class	Horsepower	Quantity
1.	WAP-7	6350	87
2.	WAG-9	6120	212
3.	EF9K	9000	6
Total active locomotives as of August 2026			305
