= Electric Loco Shed, Tatanagar =

Loco shed in Jharkhand, India

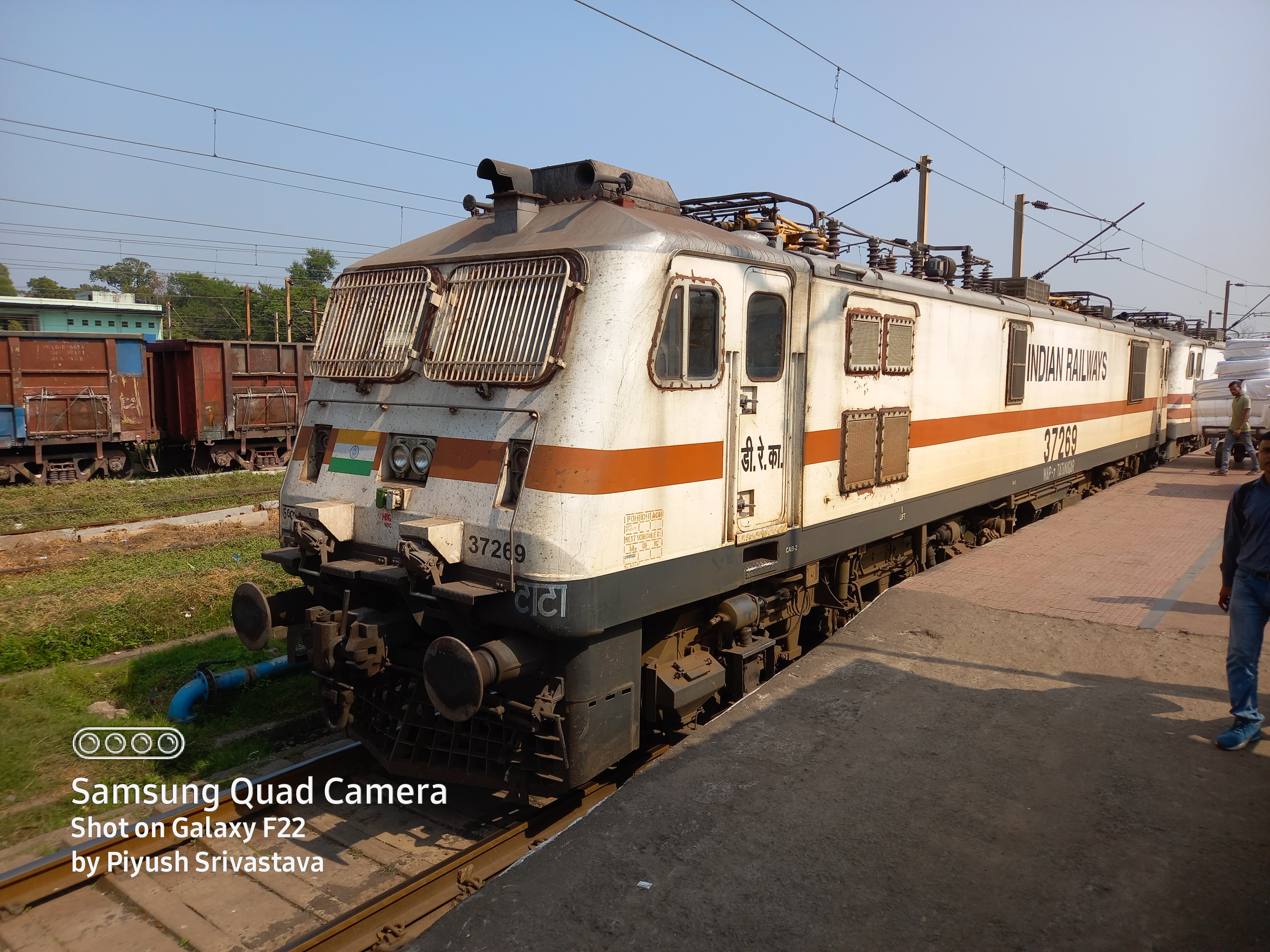
- TATA based WAP-7 at Tatanagar.

- Location within Jharkhand

Location
- Location: Tatanagar, Jharkhand
- Coordinates: 22°46′07″N 86°12′06″E

Characteristics
- Owner: Indian Railways
- Operator: South Eastern Railways
- Depot code: TATA
- Type: Engine shed
- Rolling stock: WAP-7; WAG-9

History
- Opened: 1962; 64 years ago
- Former rolling stock: WAM-4; WAG-7; WAG-5; WAP-4

Electric Loco Shed, Tatanagar is a motive power depot performing locomotive maintenance and repair facility for electric locomotives of the Indian Railways, located at Tatanagar of the South Eastern Railway zone in Jharkhand, India.

== Operations ==
Being one of the three electric engine sheds in South Eastern Railway, various major and minor maintenance schedules of electric locomotives are carried out here. It has the sanctioned capacity of 120 engine units. Beyond the operating capacity, this shed houses a total of 200 engine units, including 27 WAP-7 and 174 WAG-9. Like all locomotive sheds, TATA does regular maintenance, overhaul and repair including painting and washing of locomotives.

== Livery & Markings ==
TATA based WAP-7 has TATA Steel advertisement on loco's body side.

Tatanagar loco shed has its own logo and stencils. It is written on loco's body side as well as front & back side.

== Locomotives ==
Serial No.	Locomotive Class	Horsepower	Quantity
1.	WAP-7	6350	54
2.	WAG-9	6120	215
Total locomotives active as of February 2026			269
