= Diesel Loco Shed, New Katni Junction =

Loco shed in Madhya Pradesh, India

Modified Electric Loco Shed, New Katni Junction
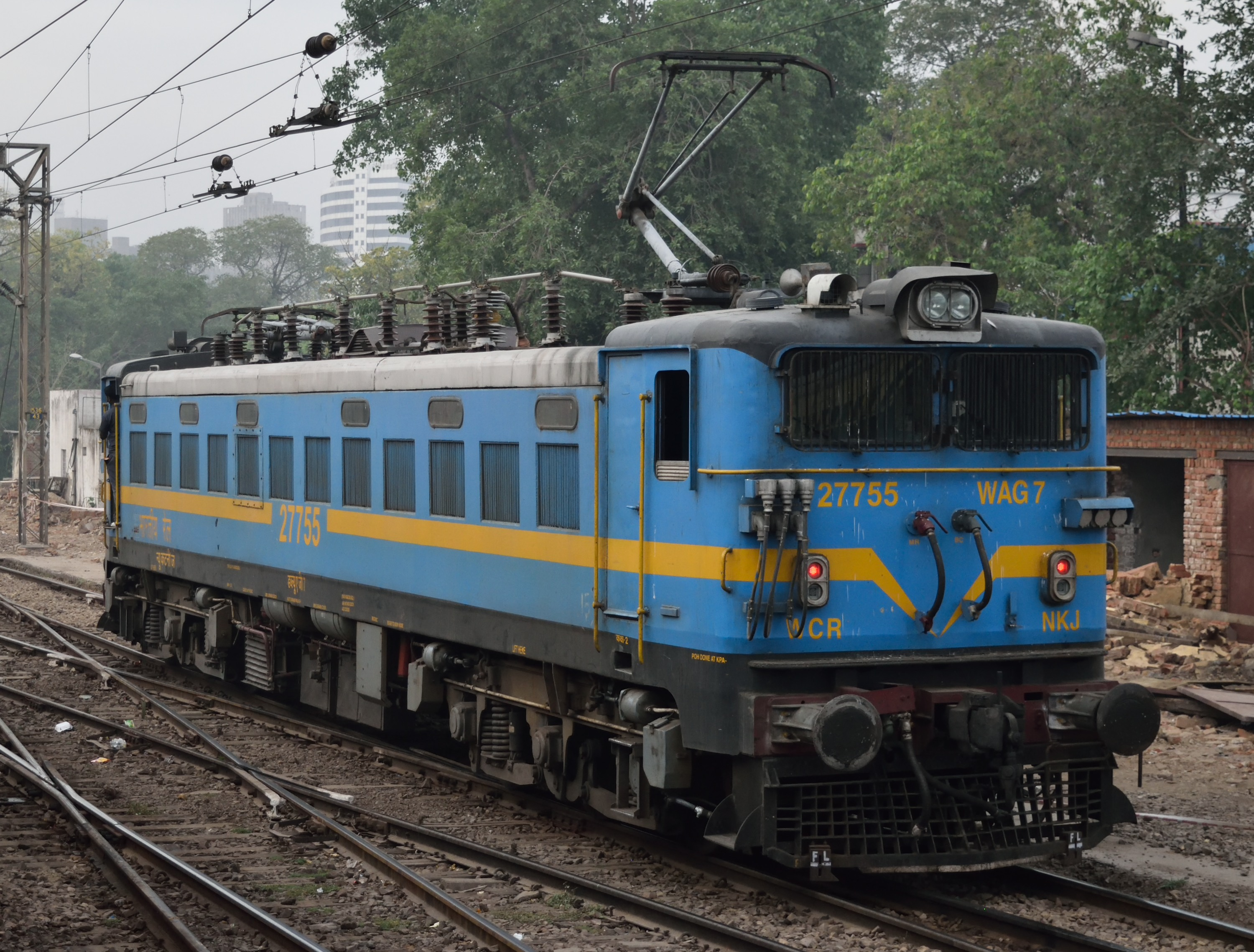
- NKJD based WAG-7 at New Delhi.

- Location within Madhya Pradesh

Location
- Location: New Katni Junction, Madhya Pradesh, India
- Coordinates: 23.7988°N 80.431°E

Characteristics
- Owner: Indian Railways
- Operator: West Central Railway zone
- Depot code: NKJ (D)
- Type: Engine shed
- Rolling stock: WDG-3A; WAG-5; WAG-7; WAG-9; EF9K; EF12K
- Routes served: Jabalpur-Bhusaval section

History
- Opened: 1962
- Former rolling stock: WDM-2; WDG-4/4D; WDM-3D; WDM-3A

Diesel Loco Shed, New Katni Junction, formerly Diesel Loco Shed, Katni is an engine shed located in Katni, Madhya Pradesh in India. Diesel Loco Shed, Katni does regular maintenance of Diesel locomotives in Indian Railways. It is now rated as one of the best sheds of the Indian Railways. It is one of the two Diesel loco sheds in the West Central Railway zone followed by Itarsi. It falls under the Jabalpur railway division of the West Central Railway zone.

== History ==
The shed opened in 1962 with forty locomotives. It was the biggest diesel locomotive shed of its time.

== Operations ==
This was the main diesel locomotive shed to serve locomotives to the unelectrified Itarsi- Allahabad section. After the electrification of this section it is now servicing Diesel Locomotives to CRS inspections and many unelectrified and remote areas of the country. Most diesel locomotives of DLS KTE/NKJ are now scrapped. Barring diesel sheds which turned into electric sheds, it is the only diesel shed which houses more electric locomotives than diesels. It holds the whole WDG-3A locomotives fleet of WCR. It used to hold the only WDG-3C of Indian Railways.

== Livery and markings ==
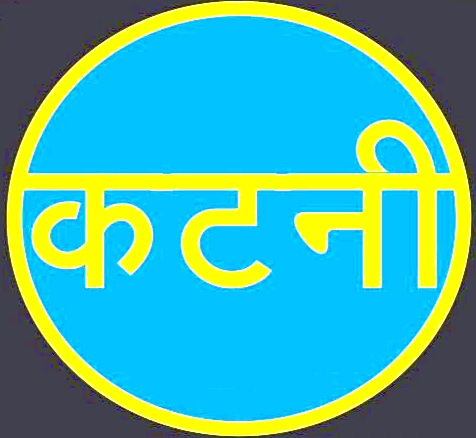
Logo Mark of Diesel Loco Shed, Katni

KTE based ALCo locomotives have a standard shed livery. Katni based WAG-5s have a standard livery. The shed is located at New Katni Junction but the locomotives simply carry the markings 'Katni' in Devanagari.

== Locomotives ==
Serial No.	Locomotive Class	Horsepower	Quantity
1.	WDG-3A	3100	8
2.	WAG-5	3850	54
3.	WAG-7	5350	96
4.	WAG-9	6120	3
5.	EF9K	9000	20
6.	EF12K	12000	59
Total Locomotives Active as of April 2026			240

== See also ==
• Electric Loco Shed, Itarsi

• Diesel Loco Shed, Ratlam

• Diesel Loco Shed, Itarsi
