= Electric Loco Shed, Kazipet =

Loco shed in Telangana, India

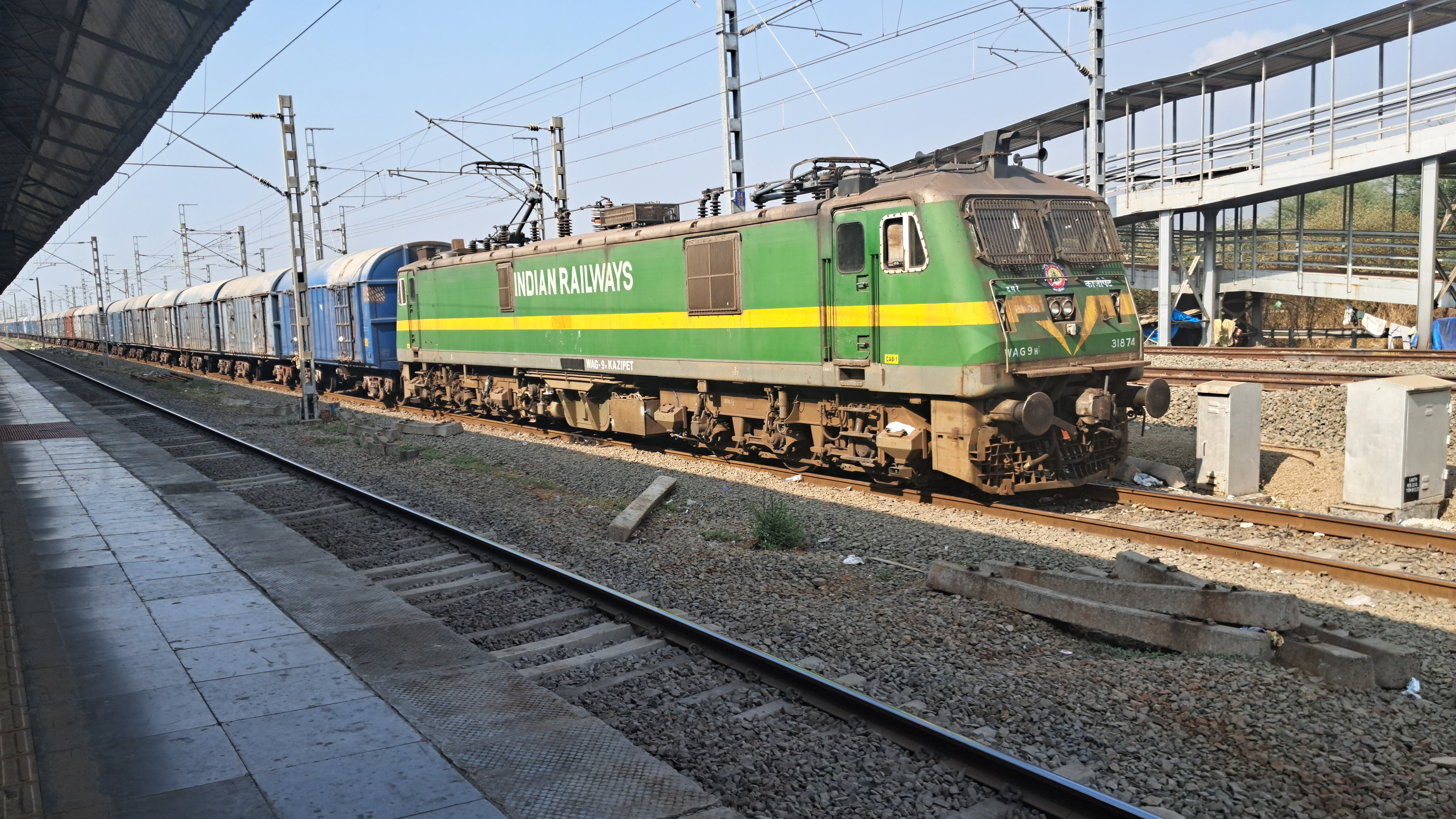
- Kazipet based WAG-9HI hauling BCNHL rake at Kelve Road.

- Location within Telangana

Location
- Location: Kazipet, Telangana
- Coordinates: 17°58′26″N 79°30′40″E

Characteristics
- Owner: Indian Railways
- Operator: South Central Railway
- Depot code: KZJ
- Type: Engine shed
- Roads: 4
- Rolling stock: WAG-9; EF12K

History
- Opened: 2006; 20 years ago
- Former rolling stock: WAG-7

Electric Loco Shed, Kazipet is a motive power depot performing locomotive maintenance and repair facility for electric locomotives of the Indian Railways, located at Kazipet of the South Central Railway zone in Telangana, India.

== Operations ==
Being one of the three electric engine sheds in South Central Railway, various major and minor maintenance schedules of electric locomotives are carried out here. It has the sanctioned capacity of 100 engine units. Beyond the operating capacity, this shed houses a total of 172 engine units, including 100 WAG-7 and 72 WAG-9. Like all locomotive sheds, KZJ does regular maintenance, overhaul and repair including painting and washing of locomotives.

== Markings ==
Kazipet loco shed has its own logo and stencils. Mostly the shed uses sticker logo.

== Locomotives ==
Serial No.	Locomotive Class	Horsepower	Quantity
1.	WAG-9	6120	288
2.	EF12K	12000	2
Total locomotives active as of June 2026			290
