= Patiala Locomotive Works =

Locomotive manufacturer in India

- Company type: Electric locomotive production unit
- Industry: Electric locomotive
- Predecessor: Diesel Loco Modernization Works
- Founded: 24 October 1981; 44 years ago
- Headquarters: Patiala, Punjab, India
- Area served: India
- Key people: Pramod Kumar (Principal Chief Administrative Officer)
- Products: WAP-7; WAG-9; 8-Wheeled Diesel Electric Tower Car (DETC)
- Production output: 198 units (2022-23): WAP-7 and WAG-9: 198; DETC: 55
- Owner: Indian Railways
- Number of employees: 3000+ (2023)
- Website: plw.indianrailways.gov.in

Patiala Locomotive Works (PLW) (formerly Diesel Loco Modernization Works (DLMW)) is a production unit of the Indian Railways located at Patiala in the Indian state of Punjab. It was set up in the year 1981 as "Diesel Component Works" (DCW) to meet the demand of maintaining the Railway's diesel locomotives. Currently, it has the job of manufacturing new WAP-7 and WAG-9 electric locomotives along with 8-wheeled diesel electric tower cars (8-W DETCs), and upgrading and rehabilitating old locomotives. It also extends maintenance support to the Railways by providing high-precision components and sub-assemblies.

== Services ==
- Manufacturing and supply of high-quality components and sub-assemblies as spares
- Manufacturing of components hitherto imported, leading to import substitution and timely availability
- Remanufacturing of critical assemblies for the unit exchange system of the railway's diesel locomotive maintenance system
- Rebuilding locomotives and power packs, and retrofitting locomotives with systems that incorporate the latest technological developments
- Manufacturing WAP-7 (starting number from 39000 onwards) and WAG-9 (starting number from 41501 onwards) electric locomotives

== Products ==
Key:

Loco currently in production

The designation of the locomotives follows the nomenclature in Indian Railways. Prototypes and individual vehicles are not listed.

=== Electric locomotives ===
Name	Wheel Arr	Built year(s)	Power	Current Status
WAP-7	Co-Co	2000–present	6350 HP	In service
WAG-9	Co-Co	1996–present	6125 HP	In service

== See also ==
- Indian Railway Service of Mechanical Engineers
- Chittaranjan Locomotive Works
- Banaras Locomotive Works
- Diesel Locomotive Factory, Marhowrah
- Electric Locomotive Factory, Madhepura
- Integral Coach Factory, Chennai
- Modern Coach Factory, Raebareli
- Rail Coach Factory, Kapurthala
- Rail Wheel Factory, Yelahanka
- Rail Wheel Plant, Bela
- Titagarh Wagons, Titagarh
- List of locomotive builders by countries
