= South Eastern Railway zone =

Railway zone of India

South Eastern Railway

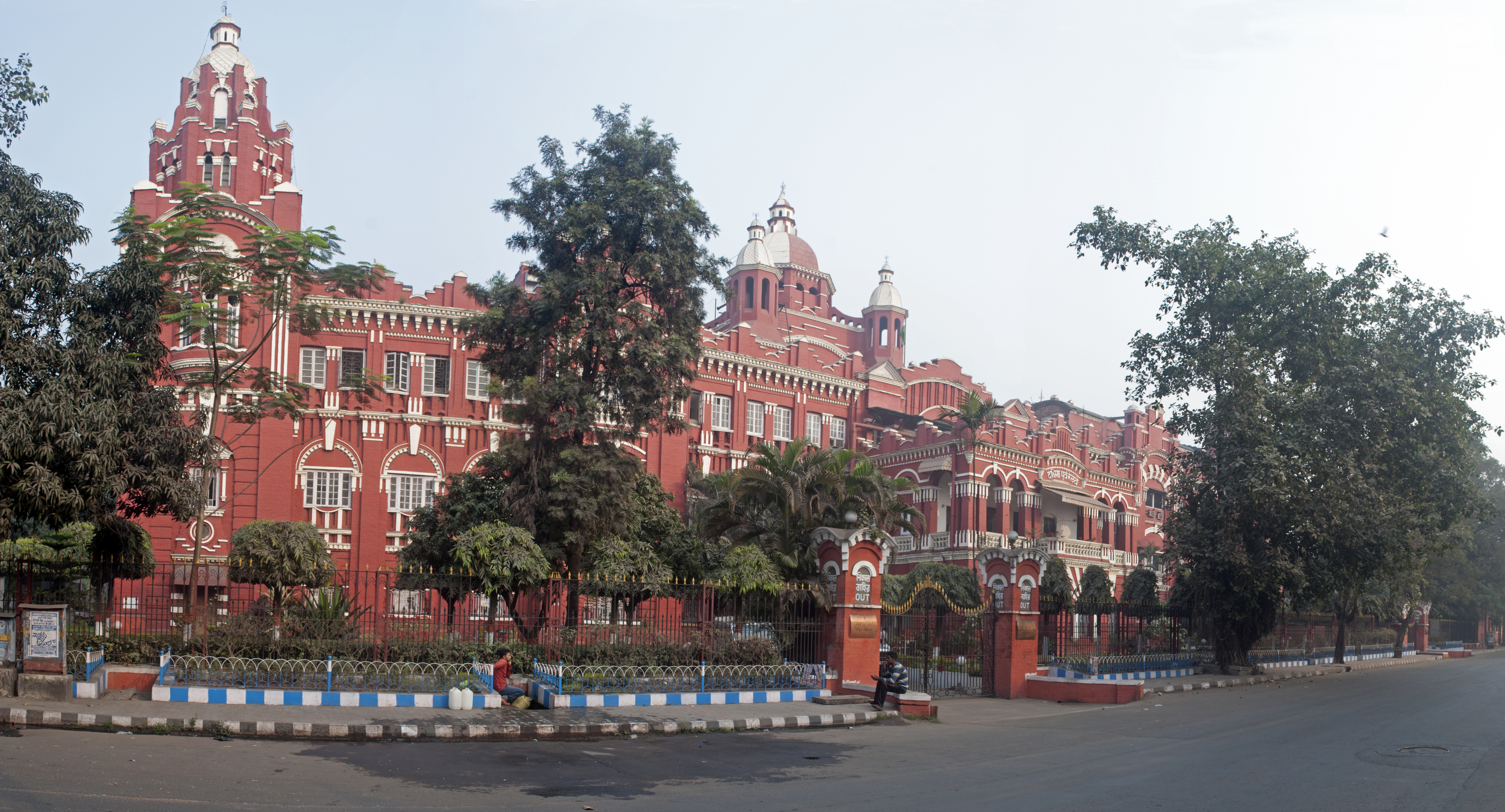
- South Eastern Railway headquarters

Overview
- Headquarters: Garden Reach, Kolkata, West Bengal, India
- Locale: West Bengal, Jharkhand and Odisha
- Dates of operation: 1 August 1955; 70 years ago–present

Other
- Website: ser.indianrailways.gov.in

The South Eastern Railway (abbreviated SER) is one of the 19 railway zones in India. It is headquartered at Garden Reach, Kolkata, West Bengal, India. It comprises Adra railway division, Chakradharpur railway division, Kharagpur railway division and Ranchi railway division.

== History ==
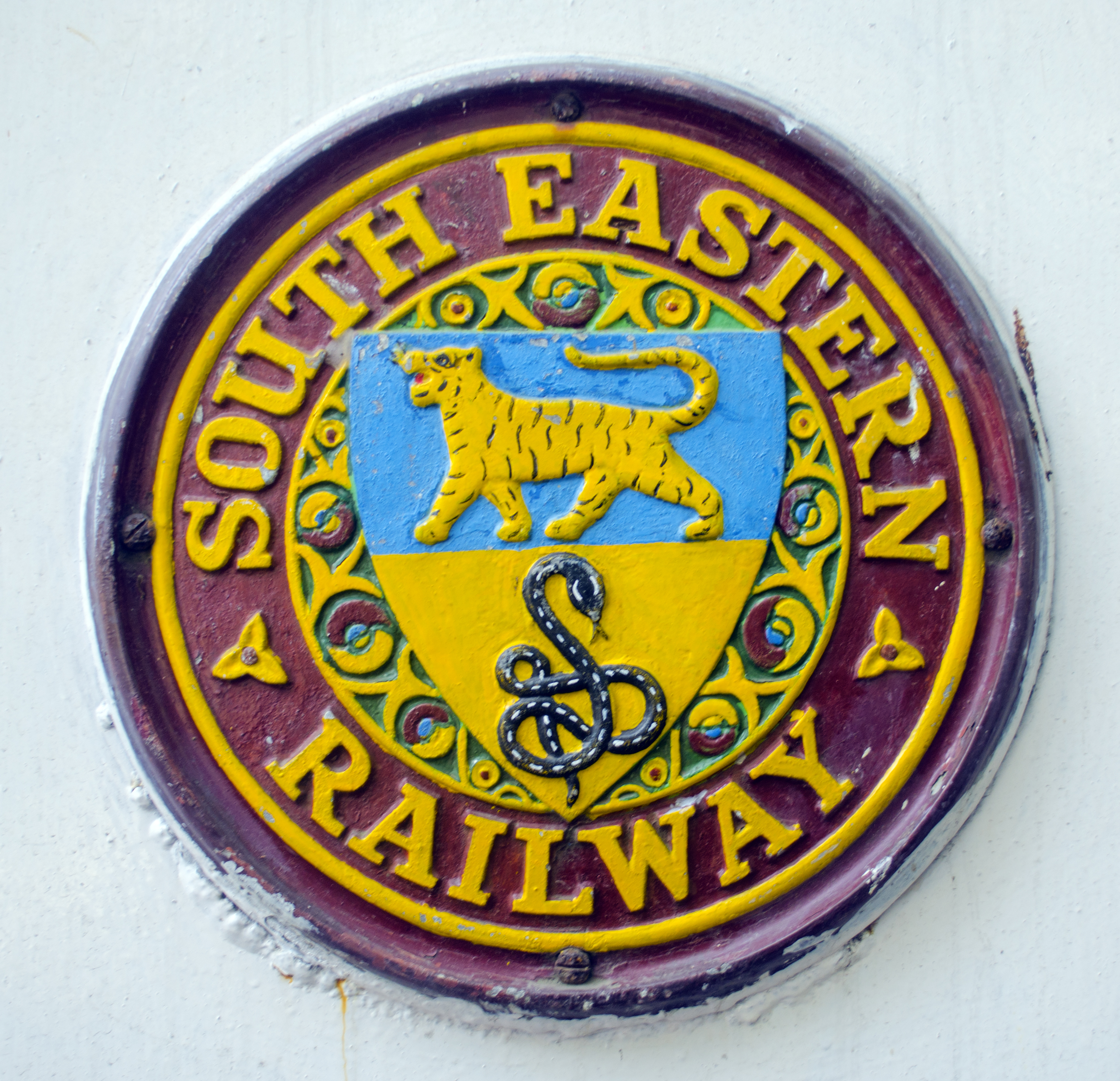
Logo of South Eastern Railway

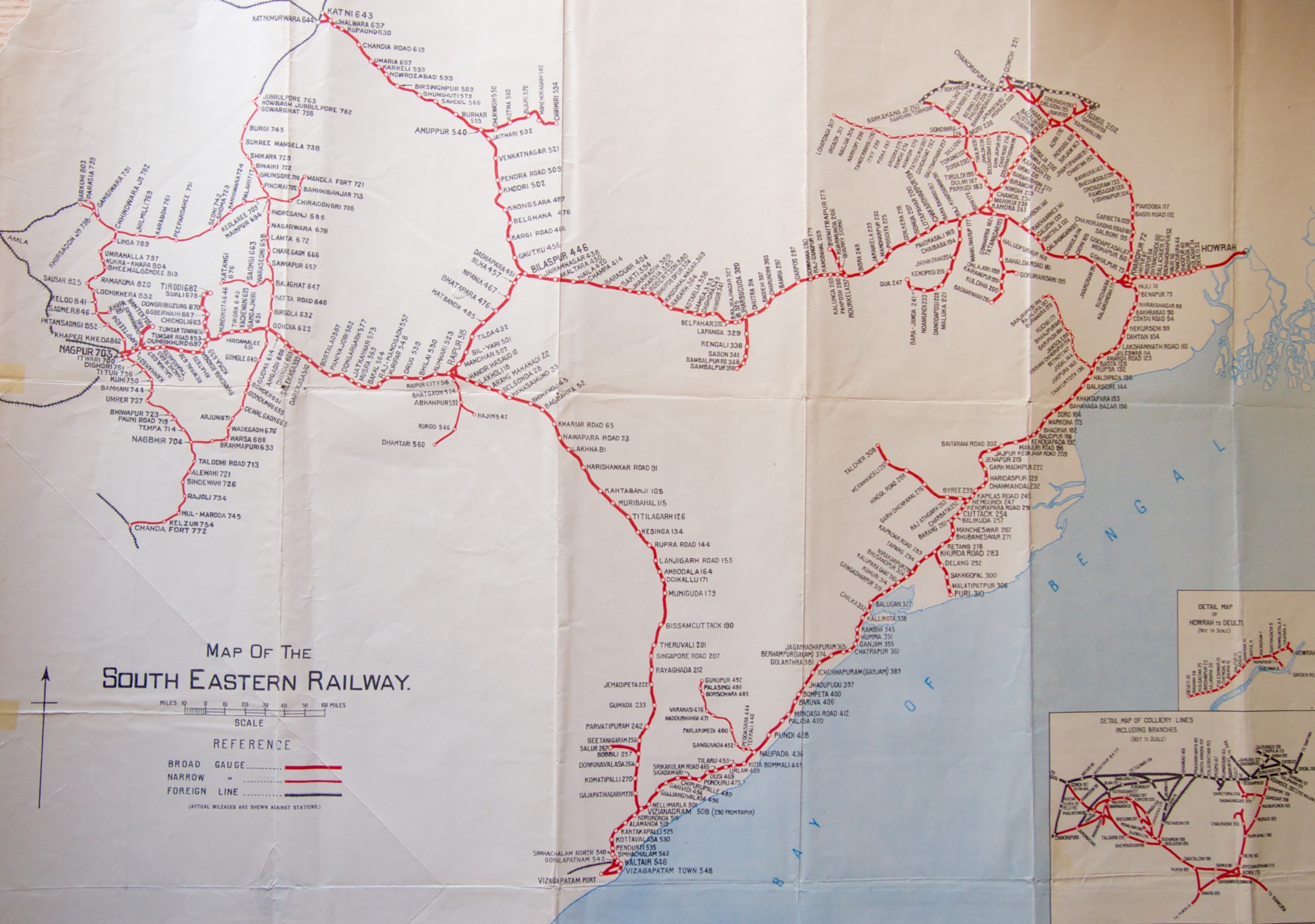
Stations of the South Eastern Railway when the South Eastern Railway was created

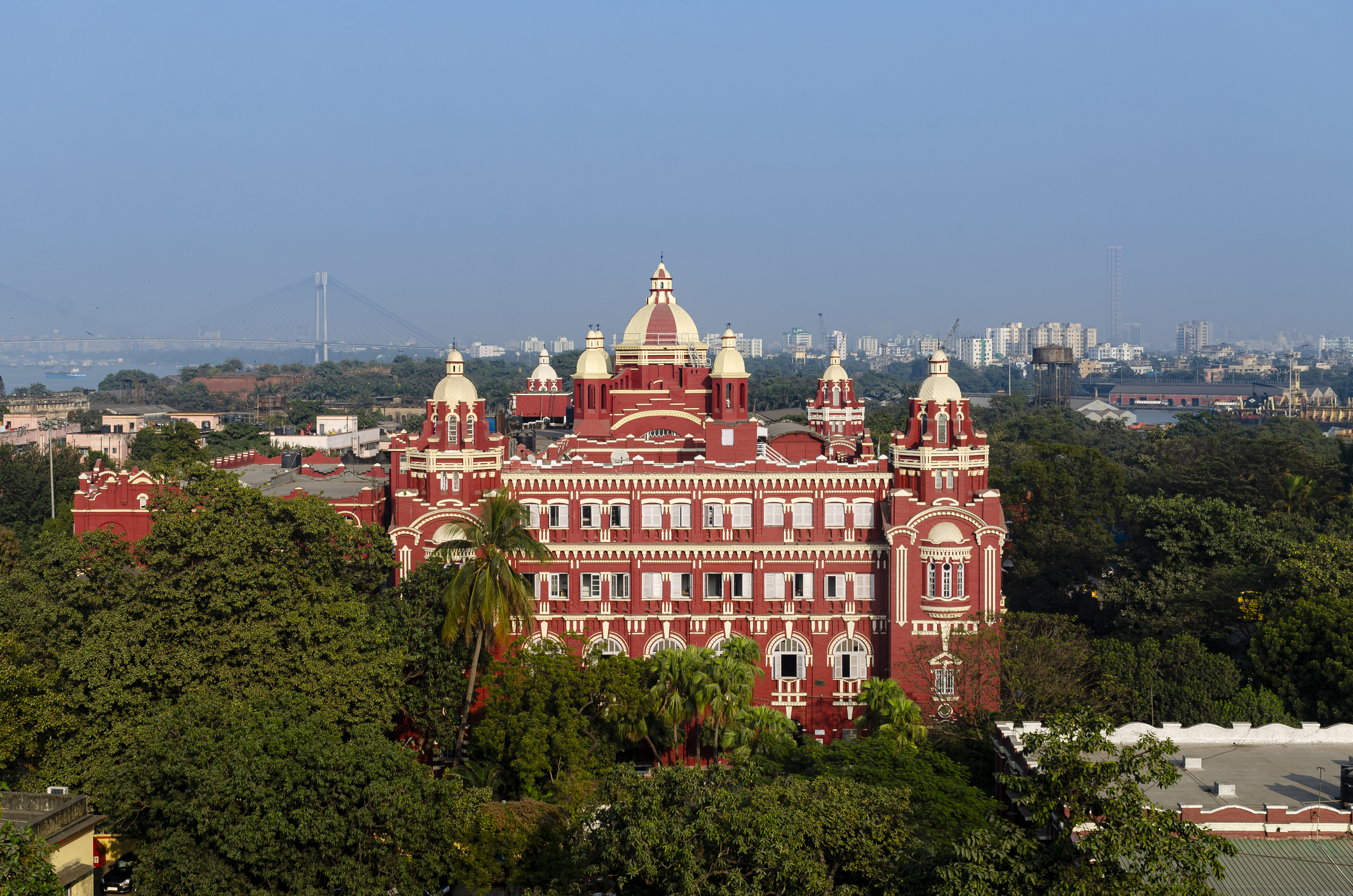
Headquarters of South Eastern Railway

=== Predecessor ===
The Bengal Nagpur Railway (BNR) Company was incorporated in 1887 to take over from the Nagpur Chhattisgarh Railway and to convert the line to broad gauge. The work was completed in 1888. The extension of the main line from Nagpur to Asansol was completed by 1891. A 161-mile branch line (258 km) that connected Bilaspur to Umaria coal mine was built and linked to the existing line from Umaria to Katni (1891). By the turn of the twentieth century, work on the Calcutta–Bombay and Calcutta–Madras lines was completed. Through the first half of the twentieth century work on the BNR lines progressed steadily. In 1921 the Talcher coalfields were connected by a railway line starting from Nergundi. In 1931, the Raipur–Vizianagaram line was set up, which connected the east coast with the Central Province. By the end of the 1930s the BNR owned the largest narrow-gauge network in the country. The BNR management was taken over by the Indian government on 1 October 1944. and continued to be called by that name until 14 April 1952, when it was amalgamated with the East Indian Railway to form one of six newly carved zones of the Indian Railways: the Eastern Railway.

=== Re-organisation ===
On August 1, 1955, the erstwhile Bengal Nagpur Railway portion was separated and a new zone, the South Eastern Railway, came into existence. In July 1967, the South Eastern Railway took over the Bankura Damodar River line. Till April 2003, the South Eastern Railway comprised eight divisions: Kharagpur, Adra, Sambalpur, Khurda Road, Visakhapatnam, Chakradharpur, Bilaspur and Nagpur. In April 2003 two new zones were carved out from the SER. On April 1, 2003, the East Coast Railway (ECoR) comprising South Eastern Railway's Khurda Road, Sambalpur and Visakhapatnam divisions was dedicated to the nation; on April 5, 2003, the South East Central Railway (SECR) comprising South Eastern Railway's Nagpur and Bilaspur divisions and a new Raipur division was dedicated to the nation. On April 13, 2003, the SER reorganized Adra and Chakradharpur divisions to form the new Ranchi division. The South Eastern Railway has electric multiple unit sheds in Tikiapara (near Howrah), Kharagpur and Panskura. Electric locomotive sheds are in Santragachi (near Howrah), Tatanagar, Bokaro Steel City, Kharagpur and Bondamunda (near Rourkela). Diesel locomotive sheds are located in Kharagpur, Bokaro Steel City, and Bondamunda. The coach maintenance yards of this zone are located in Santragachi (near Howrah), Hatia (near Ranchi) and Tatanagar. The South Eastern Railway has a major workshop located in Kharagpur, and one Engineering Workshop is located in Sini under the Chakradharpur division, and also a Diesel loco shed in Bondamunda (near Rourkela).

== Administration ==
The administrative head of South Eastern Railway is Shri Anil Kumar Jain, who is the present General Manager of SER. The South Eastern Railway caters to the states of West Bengal, Jharkhand and Odisha. SER also runs regular electric multiple units (EMU and MEMU) services to areas adjacent to Kolkata, from Howrah to Kharagpur, Amta, Medinipur, Adra, Tatanagar, Balasore, Rourkela and Santragachi to Shalimar. It also handles major freight traffic to Kolkata and Haldia.

== Headquarters ==
The headquarters of SER is located in Garden Reach in south Kolkata. The main office is housed in a spectacular building constructed in 1909. It has a brick red finish and follows the Indo-Saracenic architecture, complete with slender pillars, turrets and a huge central dome. The complex is spread across a large area complete with beautiful gardens. It houses a hospital and the BNR sports club. The residence of the General Manager (GM) of the SER is also located inside the complex. It is a colonial building dating back to 1846 and is inspired by the Temple of Winds in Athens, Greece. The milk white two-storied building with pillars and pediments once served as a residence of the last Nawab of Oudh, Wajid Ali Shah. During his short stay the Nawab the house came to be known as Pari Khana, literally meaning the house of the fairies. It The nawab was entertained by musicians, poets and dancers. The complex also houses several other buildings of historical importance and include Bungalow 12, which once served as the residence of the famous Indologist William Jones. Apart from buildings the complex also houses a vintage steam engine, a restored ball signal and a plaque of 978 Balloon Squadron, RAF.

== Divisions ==
- Adra railway division
- Kharagpur railway division
- Chakradharpur railway division
- Ranchi railway division

== Gallery ==
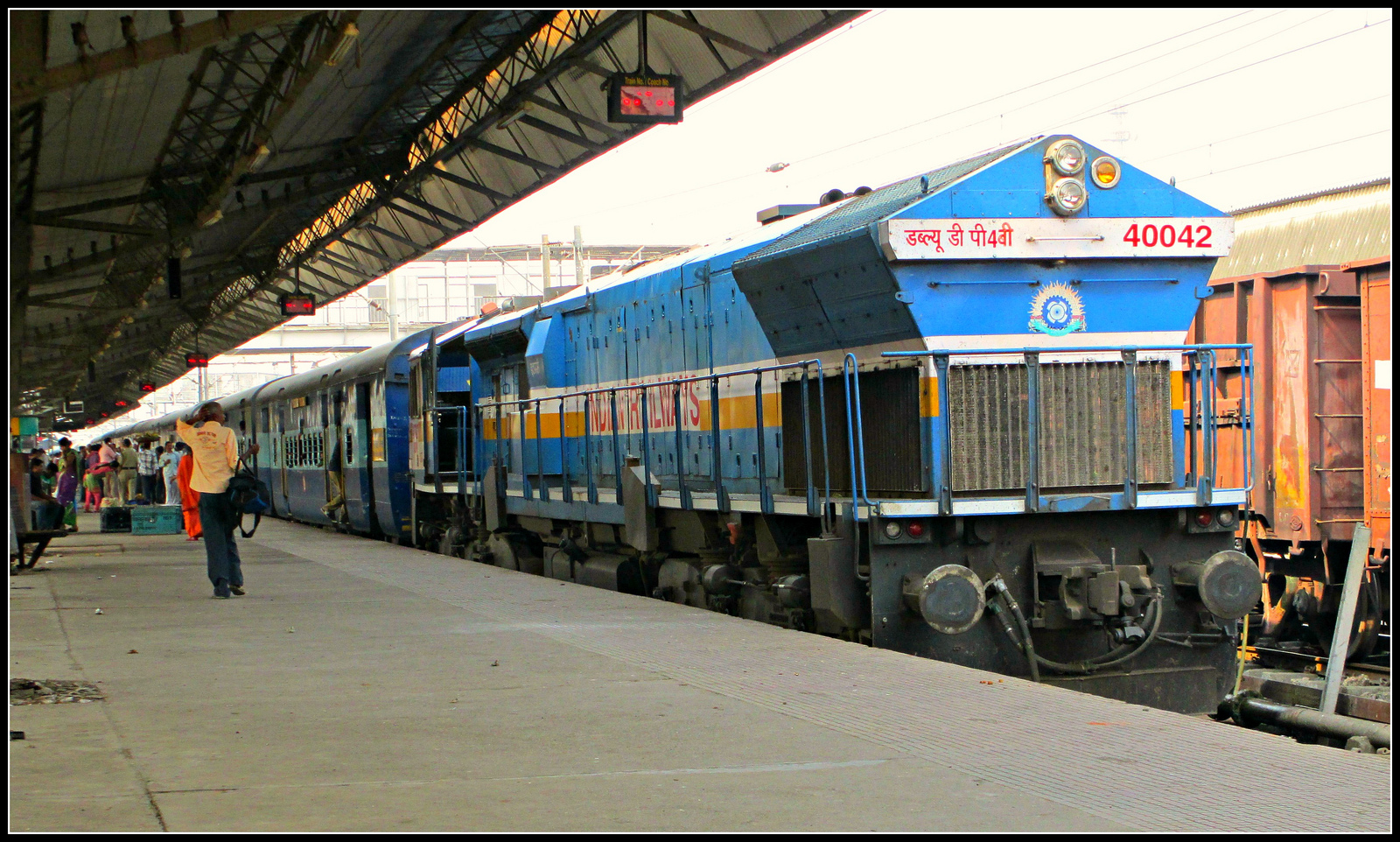
Howrah - Mumbai Mail

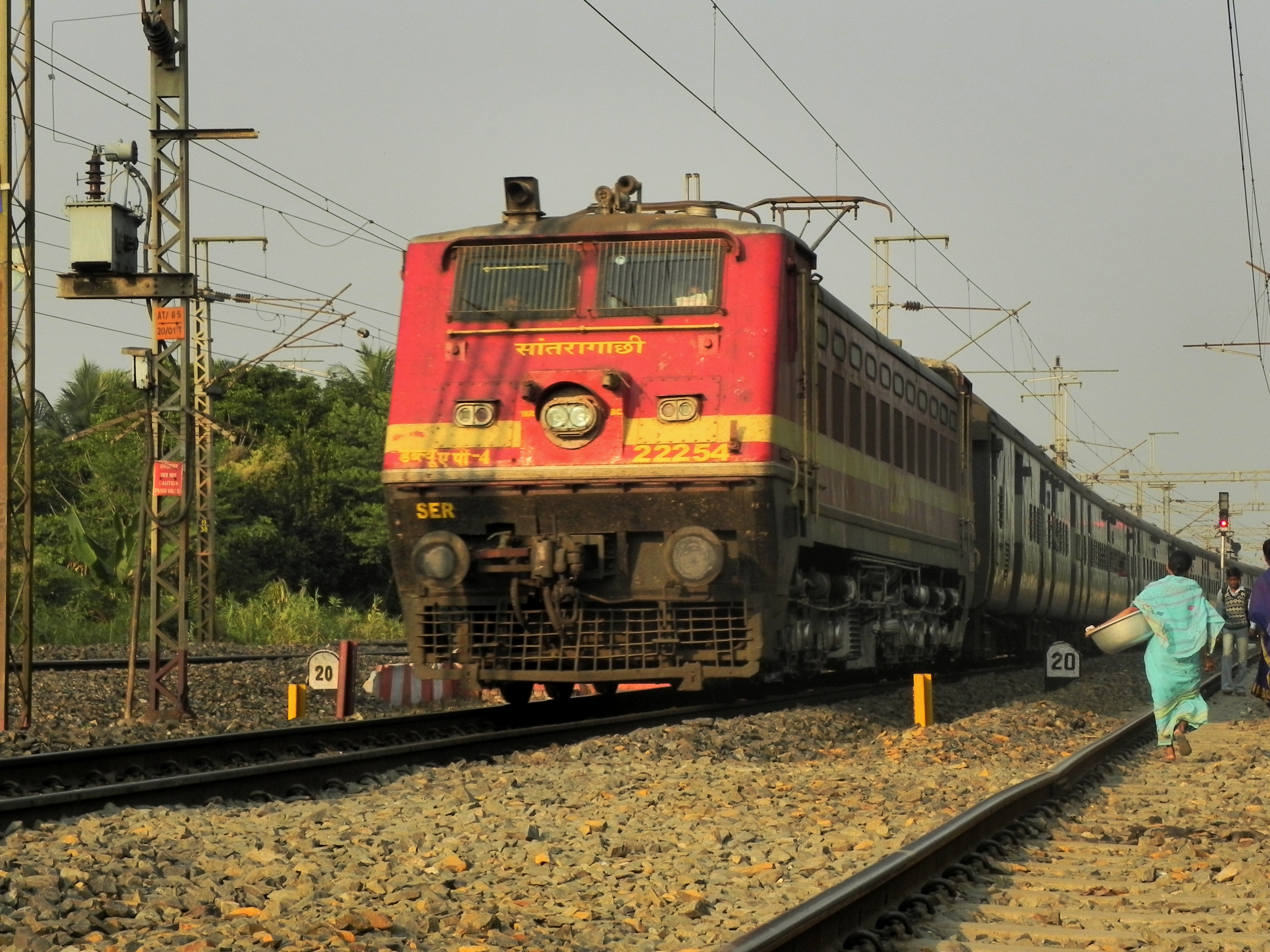
Coromandel Express

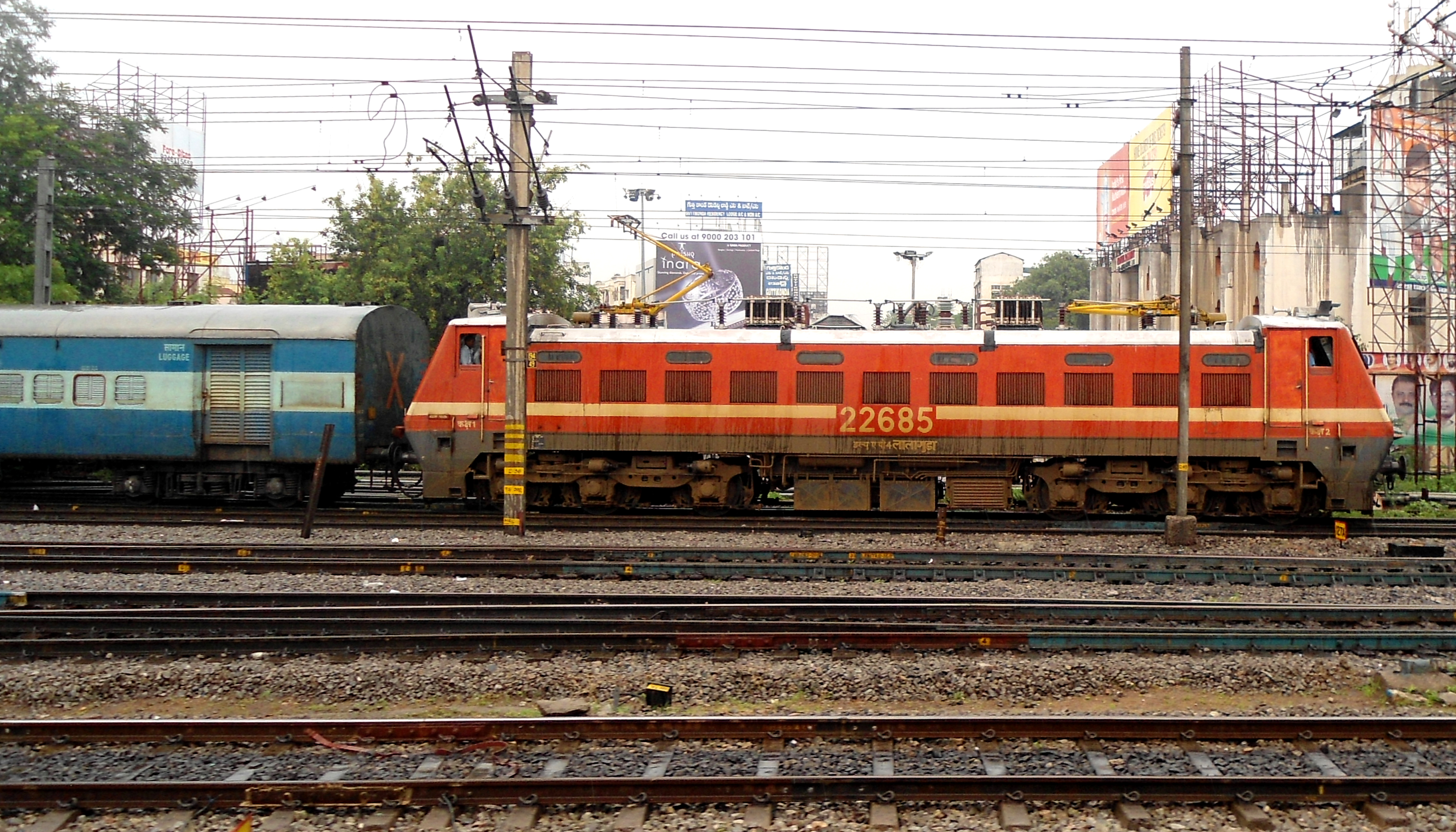
East Coast Express

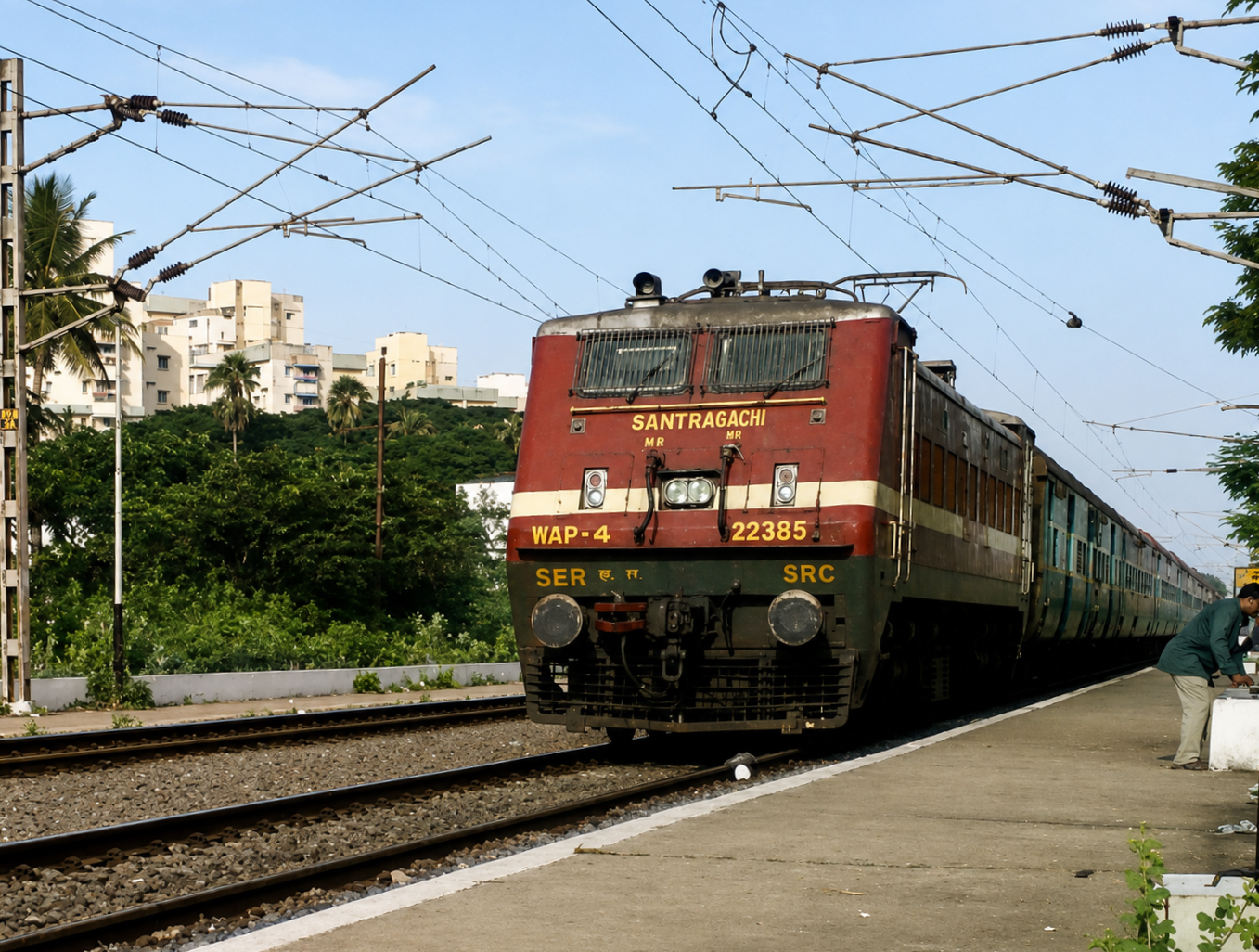
SMVT Bengaluru - Howrah Superfast Express

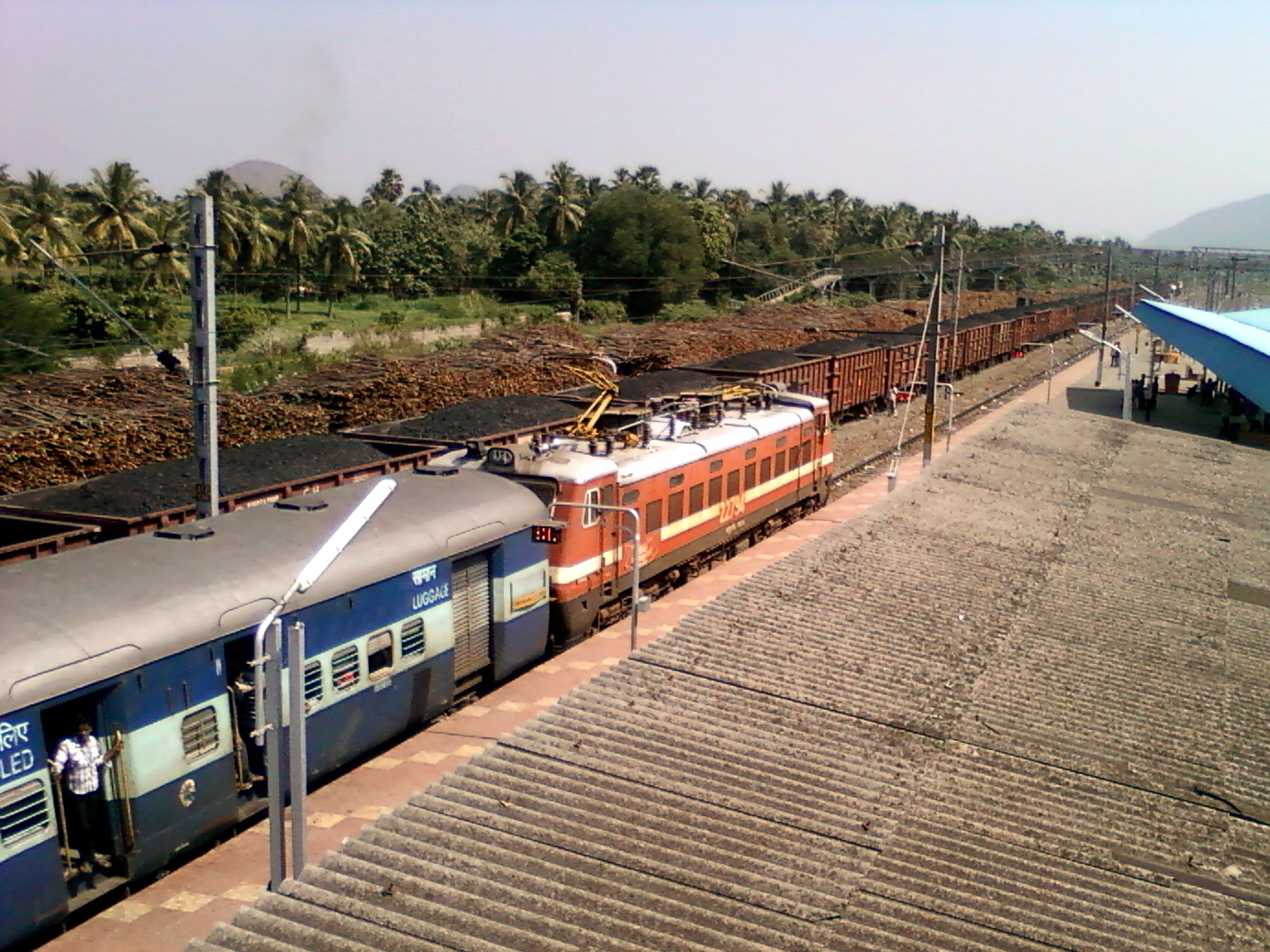
Howrah – Chennai Mail

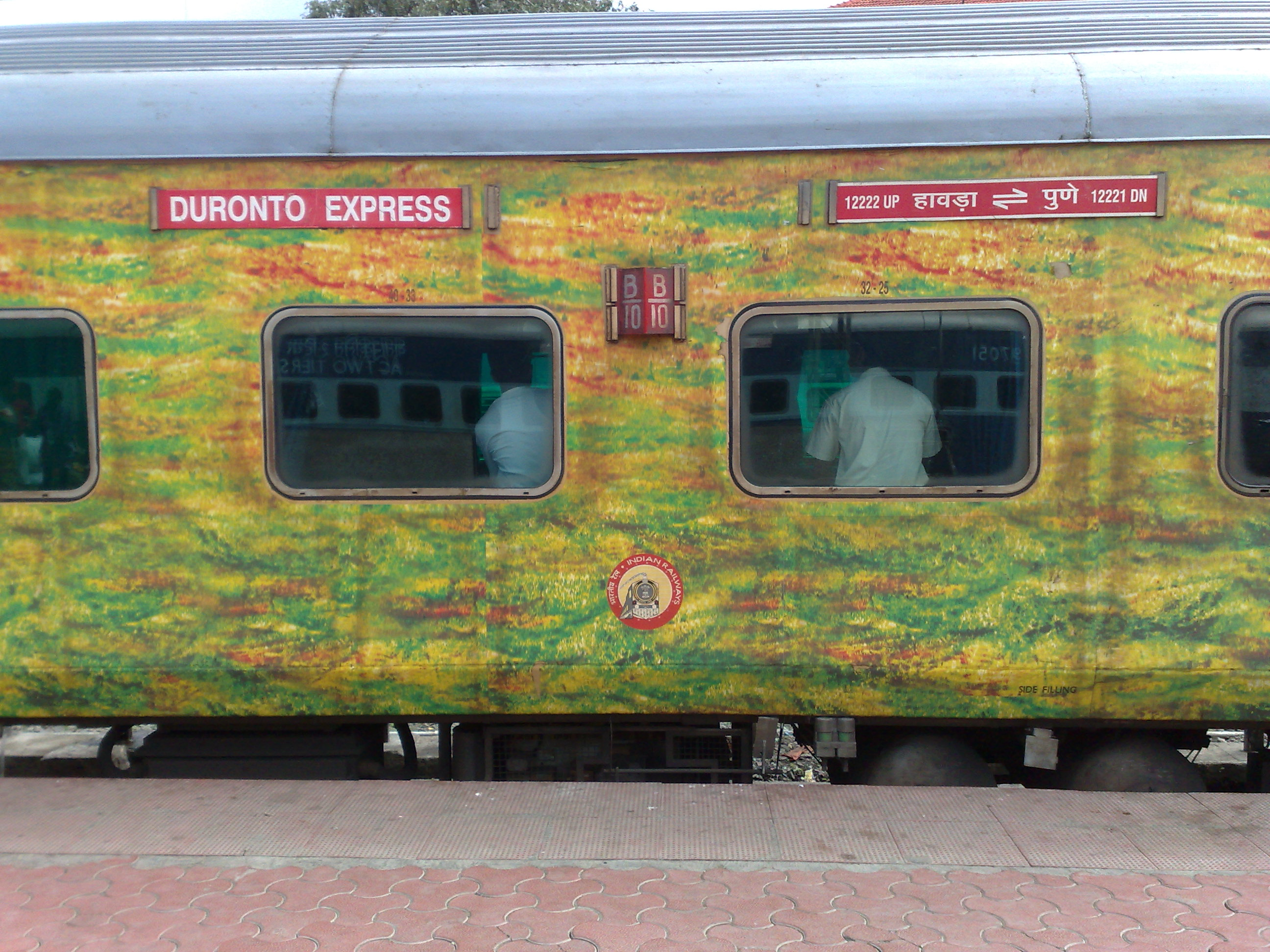
Howrah - Pune Duronto

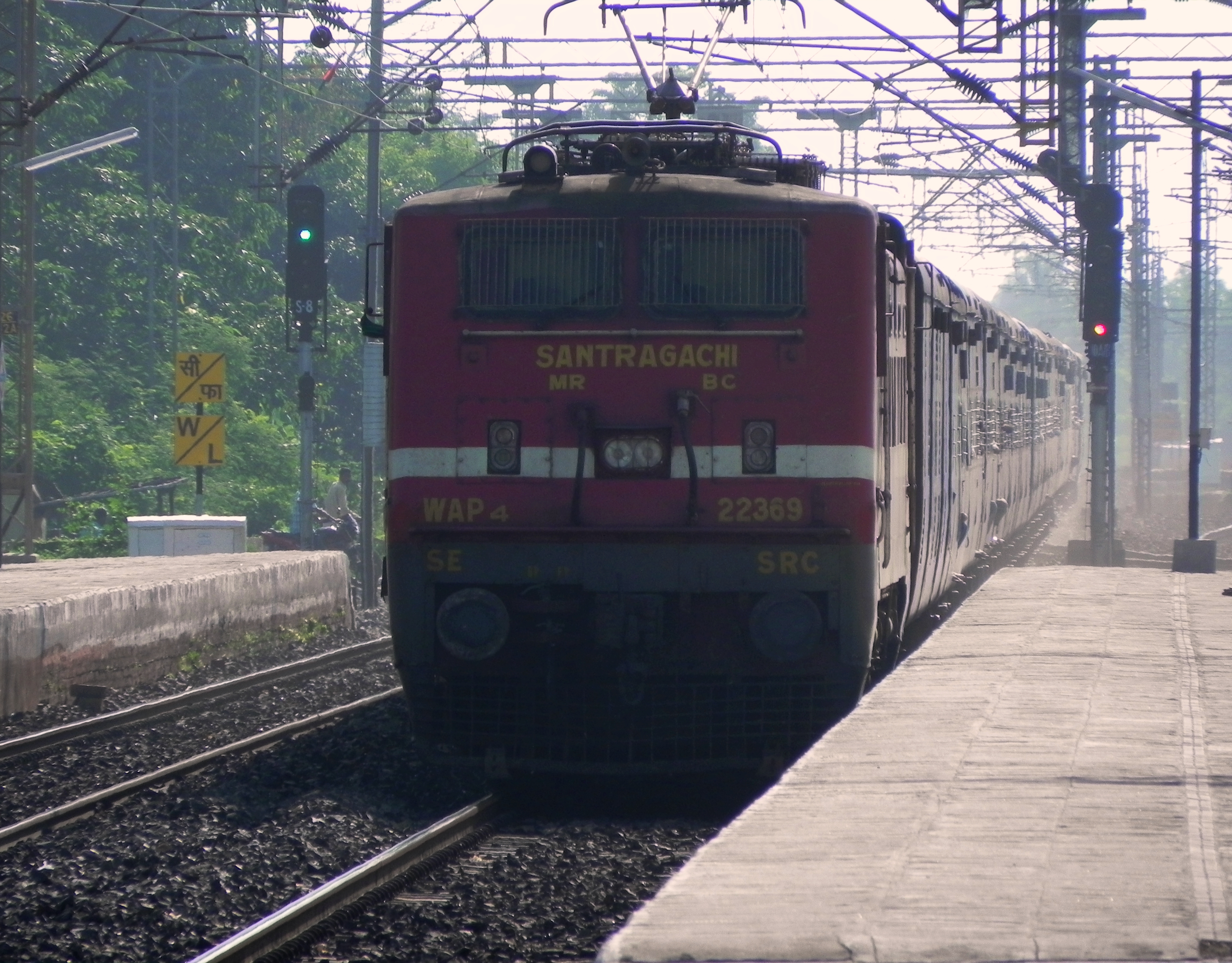
Ispat Express

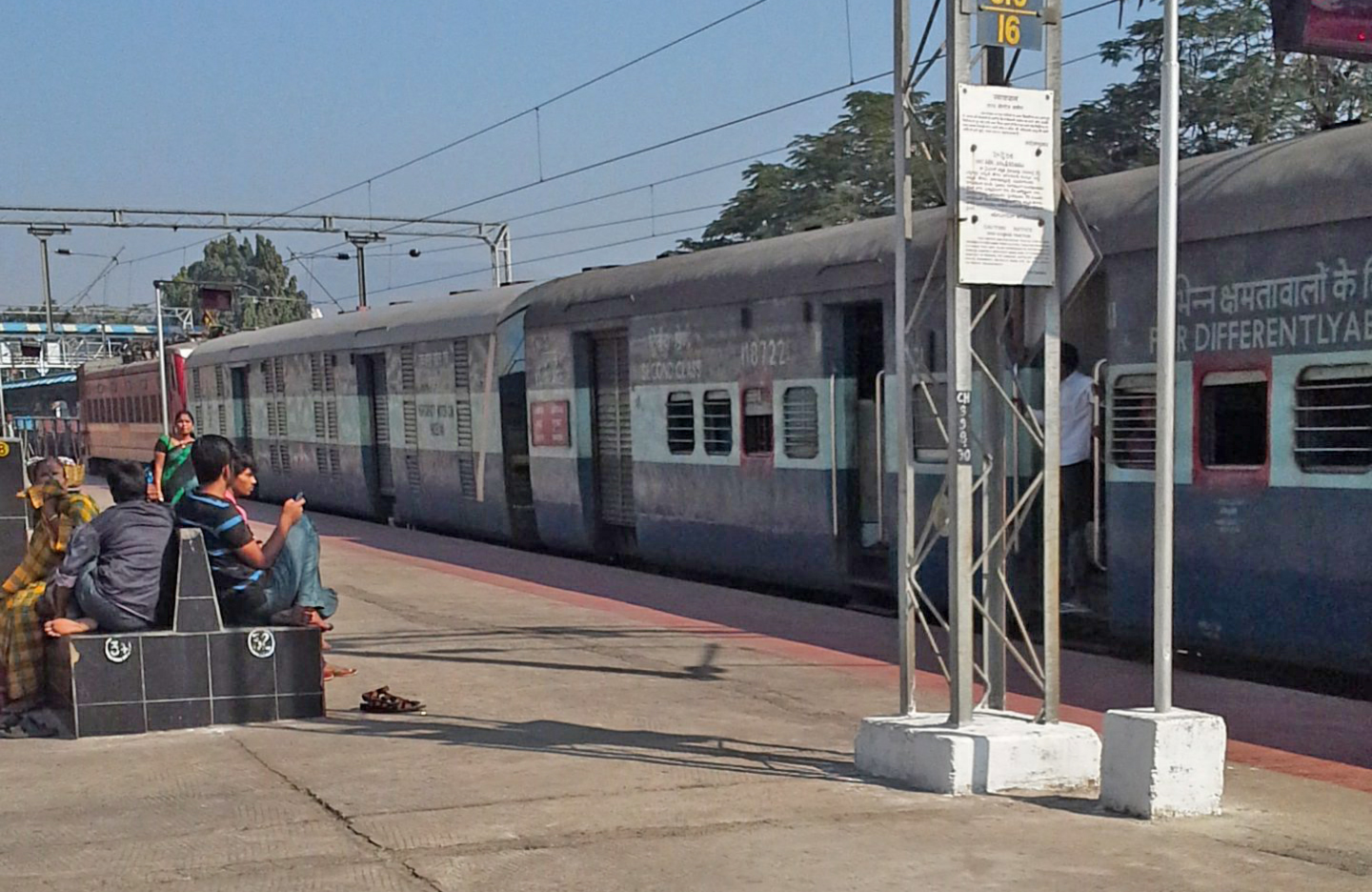
Amaravati Express

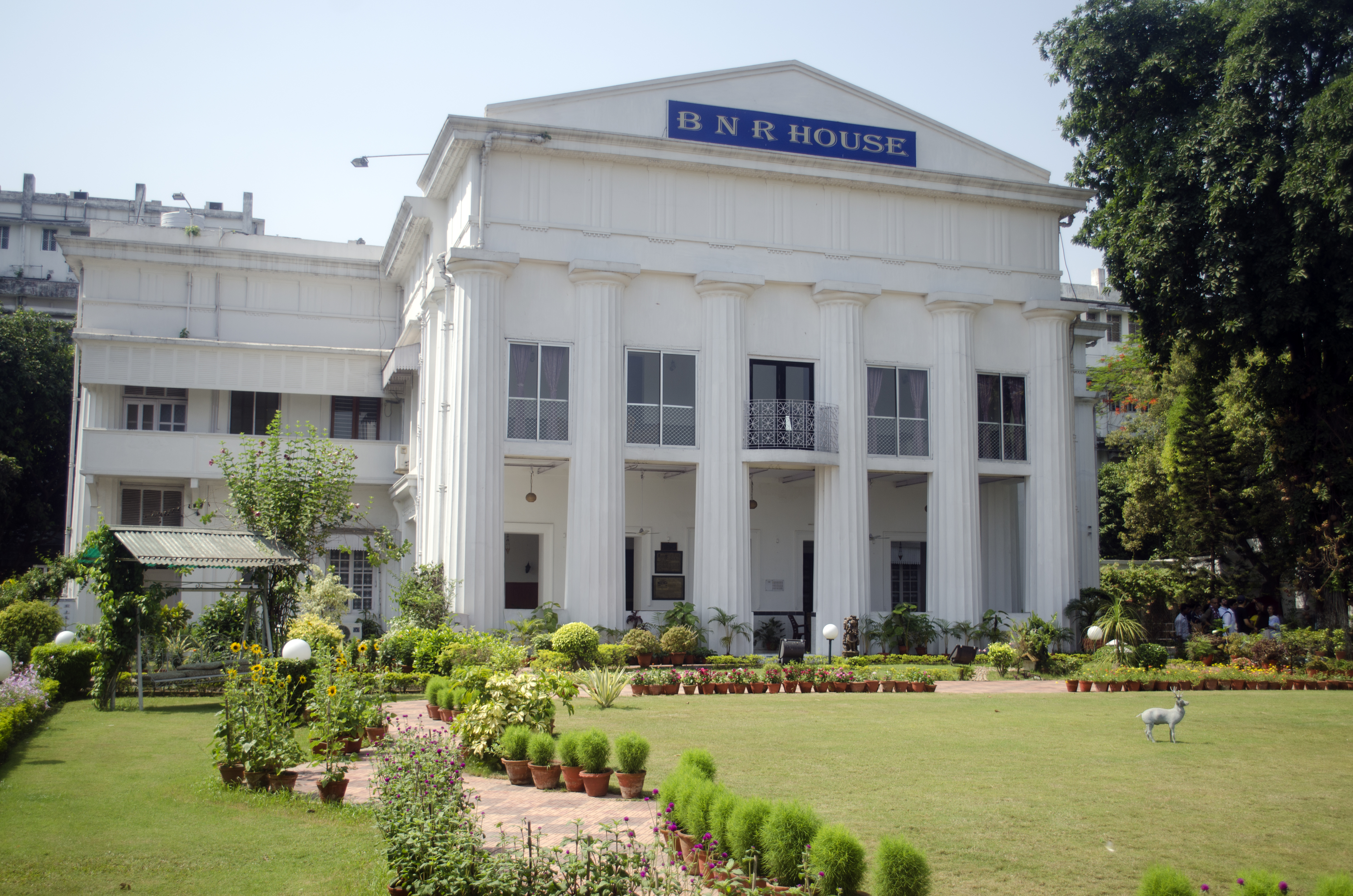
BNR House, residence of the GM of SER

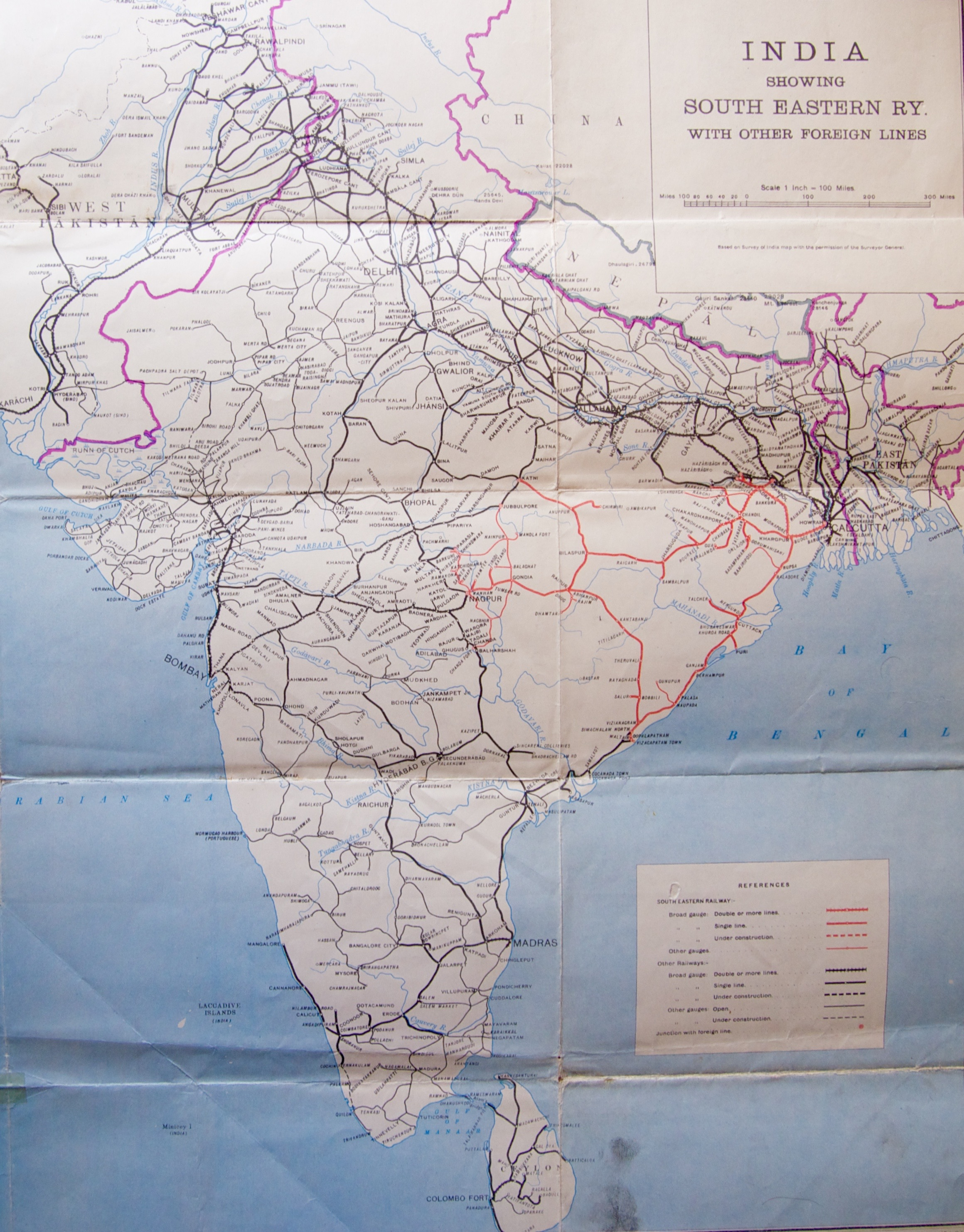
Major routes of the Indian rail system in 1955

== Loco sheds ==
- Electric Loco Shed, Tatanagar
- Electric Loco Shed, Bokaro Steel City
- Electric Loco Shed, Santragachi
- Electric Loco Shed, Rourkela
- Electric Loco Shed, Bondamunda
- Electric Loco Shed, Kharagpur
- Electric Loco Shed, Ispatnagar, Bokaro Steel City
- Diesel Loco Shed, Bondamunda

== See also ==
- Howrah Station
- Eastern Railway zone
- Zones and divisions of Indian Railways
- All India Station Masters' Association (AISMA)
