= Munnar Monorail =

Government Monorail Project

Munnar Monorail Project is a monorail project of the government of Kerala in Munnar. The monorail is to be constructed in the same area where the erstwhile Kundala Valley Railway ran nearly a century earlier. As part of the project, a preliminary study led by Devikulam MLA S Rajendran was conducted. The study was submitted to railway department and railway will conduct feasibility study for review. The initial stage of the project aims at reviving 5 km of the original line. Extension of the remaining 35 km will be done if the project succeeds. The state Tourism minister Kadakmpally Surendran has said that the renewed railway line would draw more number of tourists to the hill stations.

== Funding ==
The project would be developed under public-private-partnership model and Tata Tea Limited will be the private partner in the state government's plan to revive the light railway in Munnar. The project will be designed similar to Darjeeling Rail model.
