= Patiala State Monorail Trainways =

Company

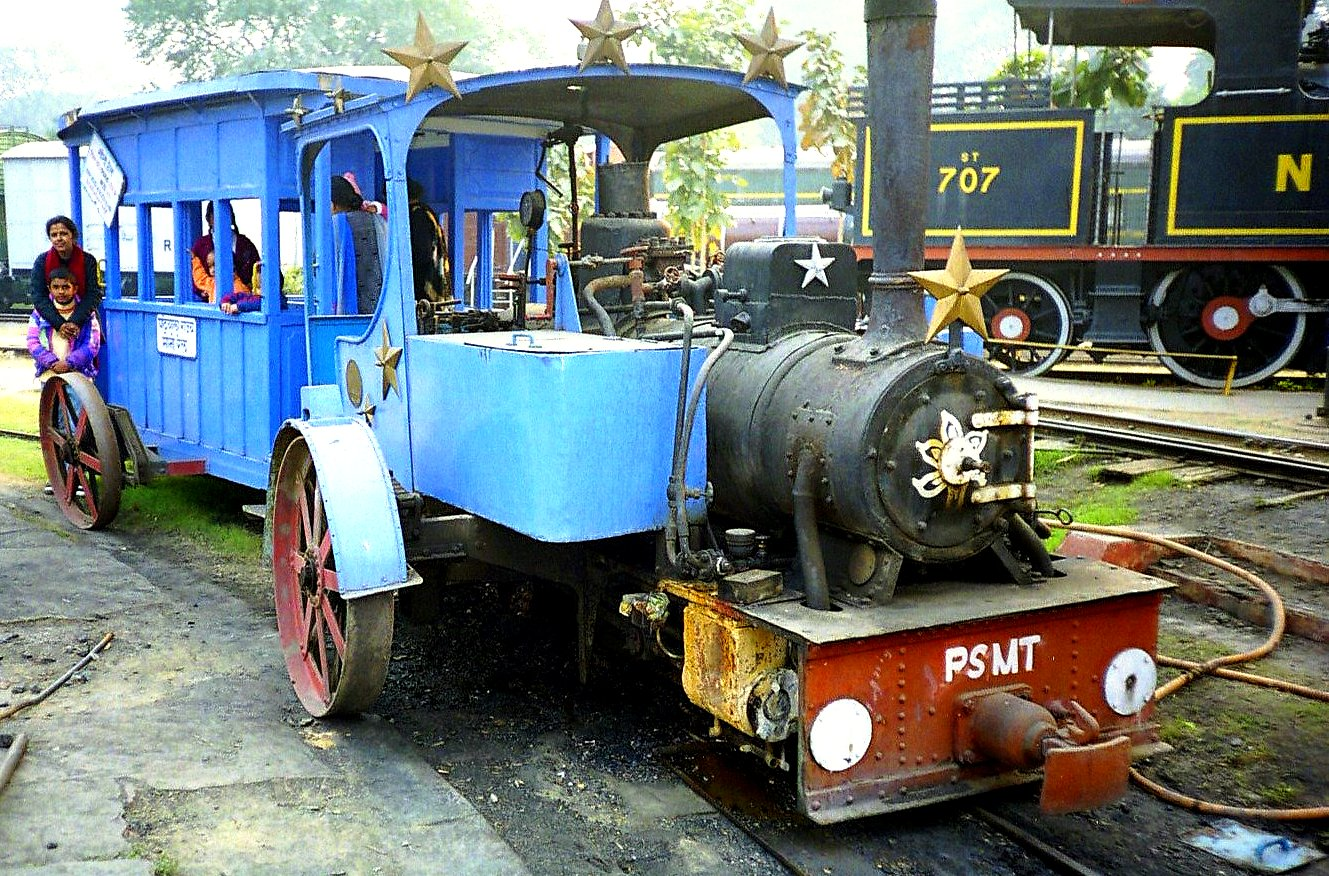
- Patiala State Monorail train at National Rail Museum, New Delhi

Overview
- Locale: Patiala State
- Transit type: Monorail
- Number of lines: 2

Operation
- Began operation: February 1907
- Ended operation: 1927

Technical
- System length: 50 mi (80 km)

Patiala State Monorail Trainways (PSMT) was a unique rail-guided, partially road-borne railway system running in Patiala from 1907 to 1927. PSMT was the second monorail system in India, after the Kundala Valley Railway, near Munnar in Kerala, and the only operational locomotive-hauled railway system built using the Ewing System in the world. The Kundala Valley Railway pre-dated this, also using the Ewing system between 1902 and 1908, although this only used bullocks for haulage. Following the conversion of the Kundala Valley Railway from a monorail to a narrow gauge railway in 1908, PSMT was the only monorail system in India until its closure in 1927. These were the only instances of a monorail train system in India, until the Mumbai Monorail was opened on 2 February 2014.

A locomotive and a coach of PSMT have been restored, are in running condition and are exhibited in the Indian National Rail Museum, New Delhi.

== History of PSMT ==
Whether it was the time or the place I do not know, but perhaps the two together conspired to bury this unique little line in the dust of time. I have found little more than brief published mentions of it and some of those were obviously mistaken conjecture. It was so different from other railways and indeed from other monorails that it was probably easier to dismiss it than to understand it. And yet, from what I can learn of it, it was effective, efficient, and exactly what the situation called for.

— Donald W. Dickens

Maharaja Sir Bhupinder Singh of Patiala got this unique railway system constructed to facilitate movement of people and goods in his state. The chief engineer of this project was Colonel C. W. Bowles. Colonel Bowles has earlier successfully used monorail based on Ewing System (designed by William Thorold) during his stint as engineer during laying of tracks for Bengal Nagpur Railway for transportation of construction materials. Maharaja Sir Bhupinder Singh made him chief Engineer for the PSMT project. One of the objects of PSMT was to make use of the 560 mules being maintained by Patiala State. Apart from mules, bullocks were also used to haul the monorail before introduction of steam locomotives on the route of PSMT.

A 1908 edition of Imperial Gazetteer of India described the PSMT as "a mono-rail tramway, opened in February, 1907, [which] connects Basi with the railway at Sirhind". An ordnance map of 1913 also shows a tramway running along the west side of the road, but does not mention the PSMT by name. Apart from the above, PSMT has not been mentioned in any official documents of that period in India.

== Advantage of using Ewing System ==
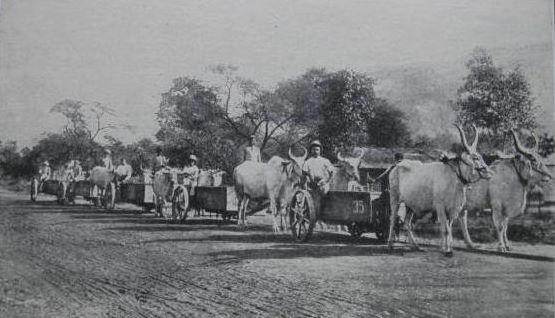
One team of bullocks can haul in one monorail truck as much as ten teams and wagons over a macadam road

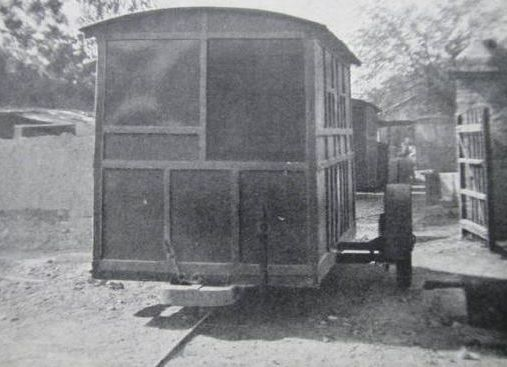
A closed passenger coach showing the single rail and the diameter 36 inch iron balance wheel

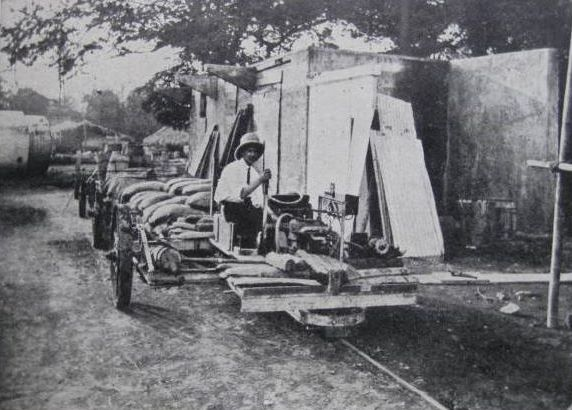
This engine was taken from an ordinary motor car to pull a train of four loaded vehicles

The railways based on the Ewing System are basically monorails using a balancing wheel for balancing the train. The main load (almost 95%) is borne by the single rail while the rest is borne by the balancing wheel which runs on the ground. Further, in normal train systems, the rails have to be at almost exact level of other rail, failing which the train may go off the tracks. By using Ewing system, this problem is solved as the balancing wheel does not need exact level to maintain the balance of monorail. In addition the cost of laying tracks also goes down considerably since only one rail is used. Another benefit of using Ewing System was that the balancing wheel could run on existing tarred roads as well as the macadam roads thus further reducing cost to lay down tracks.

Using one rail also means that the turning circle is far less than the standard trains. PSMT had to pass through some very congested areas. Since the space need to lay the tracks was less and balancing wheel could run on existing roads, PSMT succeeded in running through the congested urban areas of Patiala. The balancing wheel of PSMT ran on the roads and did not interfere with normal traffic.

PSMT could have been forerunner of mass transit system in urban areas in India. Its model still holds good for introducing mass transit system in congested urban areas where laying of train or tram tracks is not possible due to space constraint.

== Routes of PSMT ==
The total distance covered by PSMT was 50 miles (80 km). PSMT was run on two unconnected lines. One ran 15 miles (24 km) from Sirhind to Morinda. It was proposed to extend this line to Ropar but since Ropar was connected by a railway line, this idea was abandoned.

The other line ran 35 miles (56 km) from Patiala to Sunam. The lines were constructed by the firm of Marsland and Price. Today no trace of the tracks or any infrastructure of PSMT remains. However, information about the route was found in a letter by Colonel Bowles to Mr. Ambler. Colonel Bowles described the route of Patiala-Sunam line as starting from goods yard of North Western Railway (NWR) at Patiala. The PSMT then crossed the main railway line at a road level crossing nearby. It then went through walled city towards City Mandi and then took a turn north towards cantonment. Then it traveled along the main road to Bhawanigarh and then Sunam.

The steam locomotive was probably used only on Patiala Sunam Line. In his letter to H. R. Ambler, Col. Bowles wrote that the locomotives were heavy for 18 lb/yd (8.9 kg/m) rail, thus they were not used on Sirhind – Morinda line. Col. Bowles categorically stated that the steam locomotive did run between Patiala Station and City Mandi i.e. a distance of about a mile. Heavier rails (about 60 lb/yd (30 kg/m) of almost same length was found stored in PSMT Yard along with other dismantled equipments. Thus in all probabilities, the steam locomotive was used in hauling carriage only between Patiala Station and City Mandi.

== Freight and passenger ==
The route of the PSMT passed through one of the major agricultural areas of Punjab; the area around Patiala was known as the “wheat basket”. The old photographs of the PSMT show it carrying sacks of grain as well as people. Thus, the PSMT was used for both purposes.

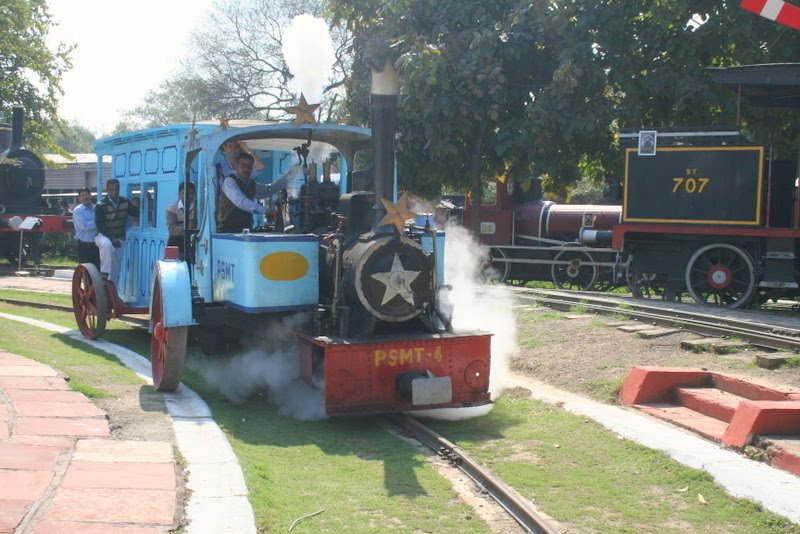
Patiala State monorail steam engine

== Steam locomotives ==
PSMT initially used mules to pull the train. Later four steam locomotives were acquired for pulling the coaches. These four locomotives were of 0-3-0 configuration and was built by Orenstein & Koppel (O&K) of Berlin in 1907 at cost of £500 to £600 each. Donald W. Dickens, in his article on the PSMT, described the locomotives as “These were an adaptation of the normal O&K 0-6-0's but had a double flanged driver in the centre of each axle rather than drivers at each end. The right-hand water tank was larger so that some of the weight shifted onto the 39-inch (990 mm) diameter balance wheel which was attached beyond the enlarged water tank. The outside cylinders were 5 1/2 in × 14 in (140 mm × 360 mm). The designer at O&K took advantage of the extra cab space behind the enlarged right-hand water tank and put the fire door on the right side of the fire box rather than at the back as is usually done. These locos were confined to the Patiala – Sunam line.”

The wheel arrangement of the locomotives were 0-3-0. The middle flange less wheel was of 50 centimetres (1 ft 8 in) diameter. Other two wheels were double flanged having groove depth of 2.15 centimetres (0.85 in). The locomotive had wheelbase of 119 centimetres (3 ft 11 in).

== Rolling stock ==
- Wagons were normally 8 by 6 ft (2.4 by 1.8 m), with two 8-inch (200 mm) diameter rail wheels. The coaches were supported by a road wheel of 98 cm (3 ft 3 in) diameter, set at 7 feet (2.1 m) from the rail.
- The passenger coaches on the Sirhind Line were open-sided wagons with knifeboard seating.
- In 1908 there was a total of 75 goods wagons and 15 passenger coaches.
- According to Col. Bowles, there were a few 30-foot (9.1 m) long goods wagons, having two road wheels. Some of these wagons were also converted for use as passenger coaches by having transverse benches fitted in them.

== Details about PSMT track ==
The track of PSMT was constructed by firm named Marsland and Price, who were based in Bombay. The track was 18 lb/yd (8.9 kg/m) rail clipped to 10 by 8 by 1/2 in (254 by 203 by 13 mm) iron sleepers.

On the Patiala – Sunam line, 15 by 3 by 4 in (381 by 76 by 102 mm) wooden sleepers were initially used but later replaced with iron sleepers due to termite infestation.

== Passengers, fares and cargo ==
The PSMT was begun in 1907. Within a few years the advent of cars and trucks had the same effect on this line as it did on so many others. In 1927 the line was closed and here again it became unique. While most abandoned rail equipment is soon fed to the scrapper's torch and furnace, the PSMT's equipment was simply walked away from. For 35 years it rested where it was left. If it were not for a Mr. Mike Satow, a historian of things railroady in India, who discovered the remains in 1962, it would have disappeared from memory by now and so this page is dedicated to him. Largely due to him, one locomotive was restored to full working order by the Northern Railway Workshops at Amritsar. They also reconstructed the Chief Engineer's private inspection car on an old underframe and the two were placed as an operating display at the National Railway Museum of India.

— Donald W. Dickens

The only account of operational details of PSMT is found in papers of Colonel Bowles. According to a memorandum dated 2 October 1908, found amongst Colonel Bowles papers, PSMT carried 20,000 passengers in a month on Sirhand – Morinda line. There are no details of the quantity of goods carried.

The fare is stated to be 1½ annas for the entire route. The rate for carrying goods is mentioned to be 1 anna per maund (80 lb (36 kg)).

There is no account available for fares or number of passenger or quantity of goods carried on Patiala – Sunam line.

== End of PSMT ==
Around 1912, with the advent of automobiles and improved roads, PSMT began losing favour with people. Ultimately PSMT was closed on 1 October 1927. Maharaja Bhupinder Singh expired in 1938 and Col. Bowles, who was in England, on leave, was uninterested in returning.

== Technical experiments in PSMT ==
Colonel Bowles also experimented with a petrol driven locomotive on Sirhind section. Mr. Donald W. Dicken's article carries a picture captioned "Motor Engine Trial On Patiala State Monorailway". This picture shows four loaded vehicles being pulled by an "Ordinary Motor Car Engine". This experiment was supposedly carried out in 1930. This experiment was exception to animal power or steam power used to pull PSMT. This would be first locally built internal combustion engine locomotive in Indian subcontinent.

== Discovery of PSMT ==
PSMT was forgotten even in Patiala, until its remains were discovered in a Public Work Department (PWD) shed by Mike Satow in 1962. PSMT had not been a much publicised railway system. It had been briefly been mentioned in an article by H. A. Robinson in 1936. Thereafter John Day and Brian Wilson mentioned PSMT in detail in their book Unusual railways in 1957. Day got in touch with Colonel Bowles, who provided him some information and photographs of PSMT. Based on these information, Day wrote another article that appeared in Railway World magazine in 1962.Satow took it upon himself to find the remains of PSMT and discovered the same in a PWD shed in Patiala in 1962. This article was read by H R Ambler, who did further research and wrote an article – "An Indian “Might-Have-Been”", which was published in the February 1969 issue of The Railway Magazine. Ultimately, due to the effort of Satow and others, One PSMT locomotive (Number PSMT – 4) was restored along with Chief Engineer's private inspection car (this coach was rebuilt on original frame as a normal passenger coach). Both of these are on display at the Indian National Railway Museum, New Delhi. A further Locomotive is also preserved on a plinth at the Amritsar Workshops of the NR. No information is available about the rest of the locomotives or coaches.

== PSMT at National Rail Museum ==
After being restored, PSMT has become one of the star attractions of PSMT at National Rail Museum. It is regularly steamed up and runs on Sundays. It is open for public rides on Sundays as well as by special booking in advance.

== Gallery ==
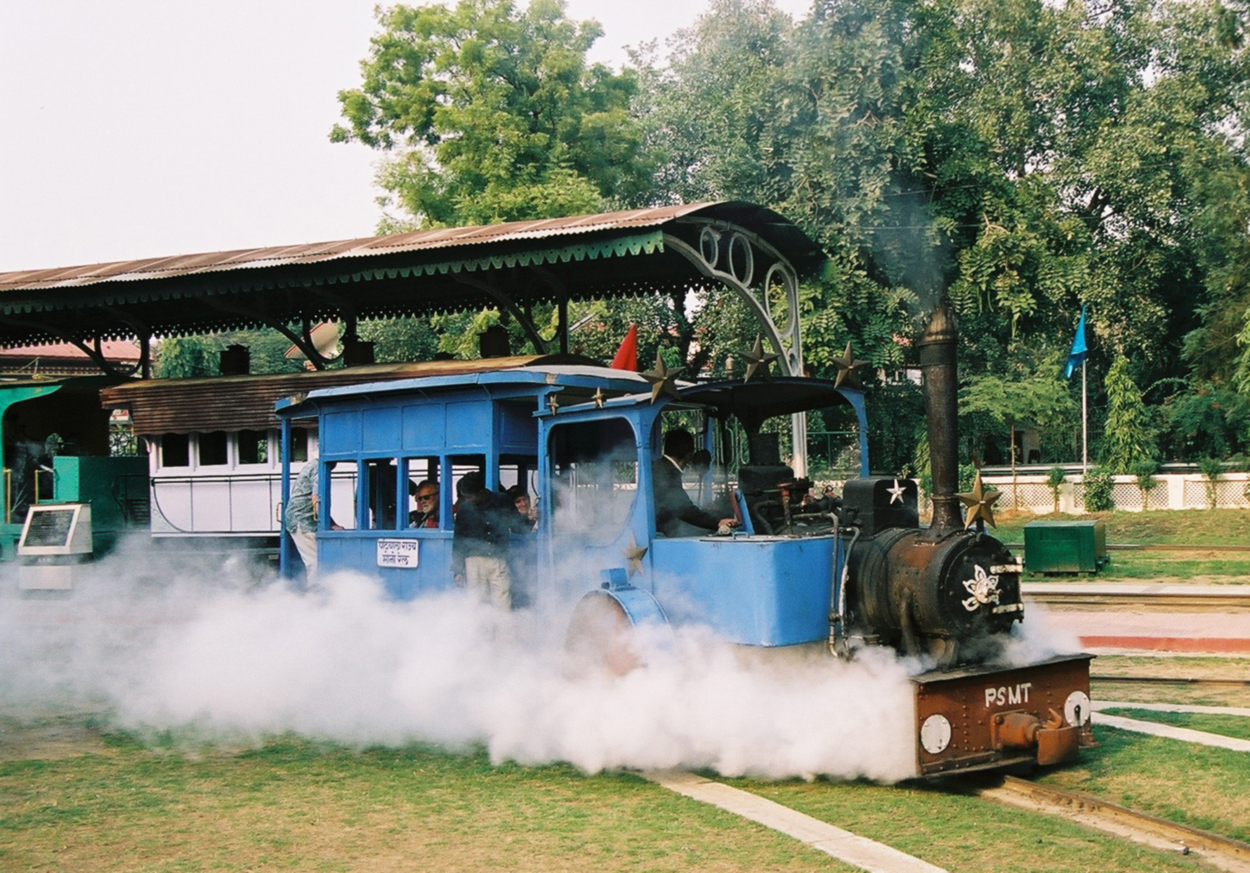
Patiala State Monorail

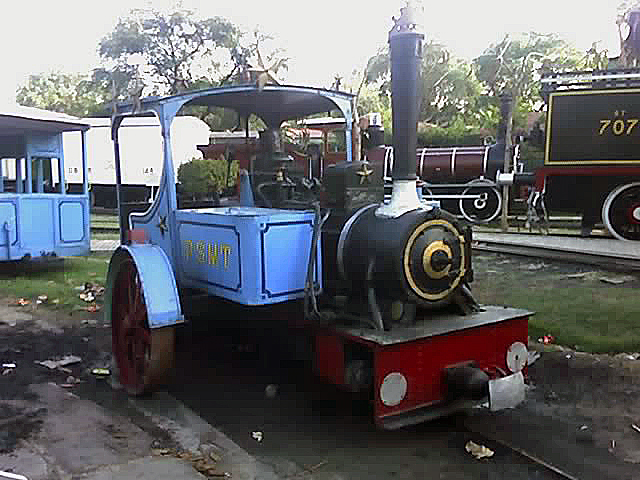
Locomotive of PSMT

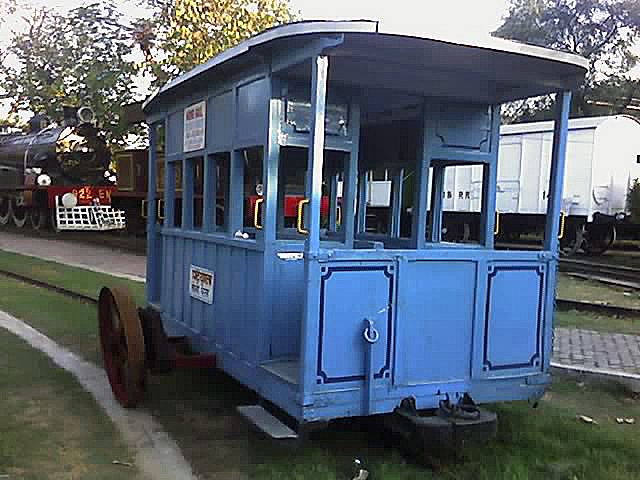
Coach of PSMT

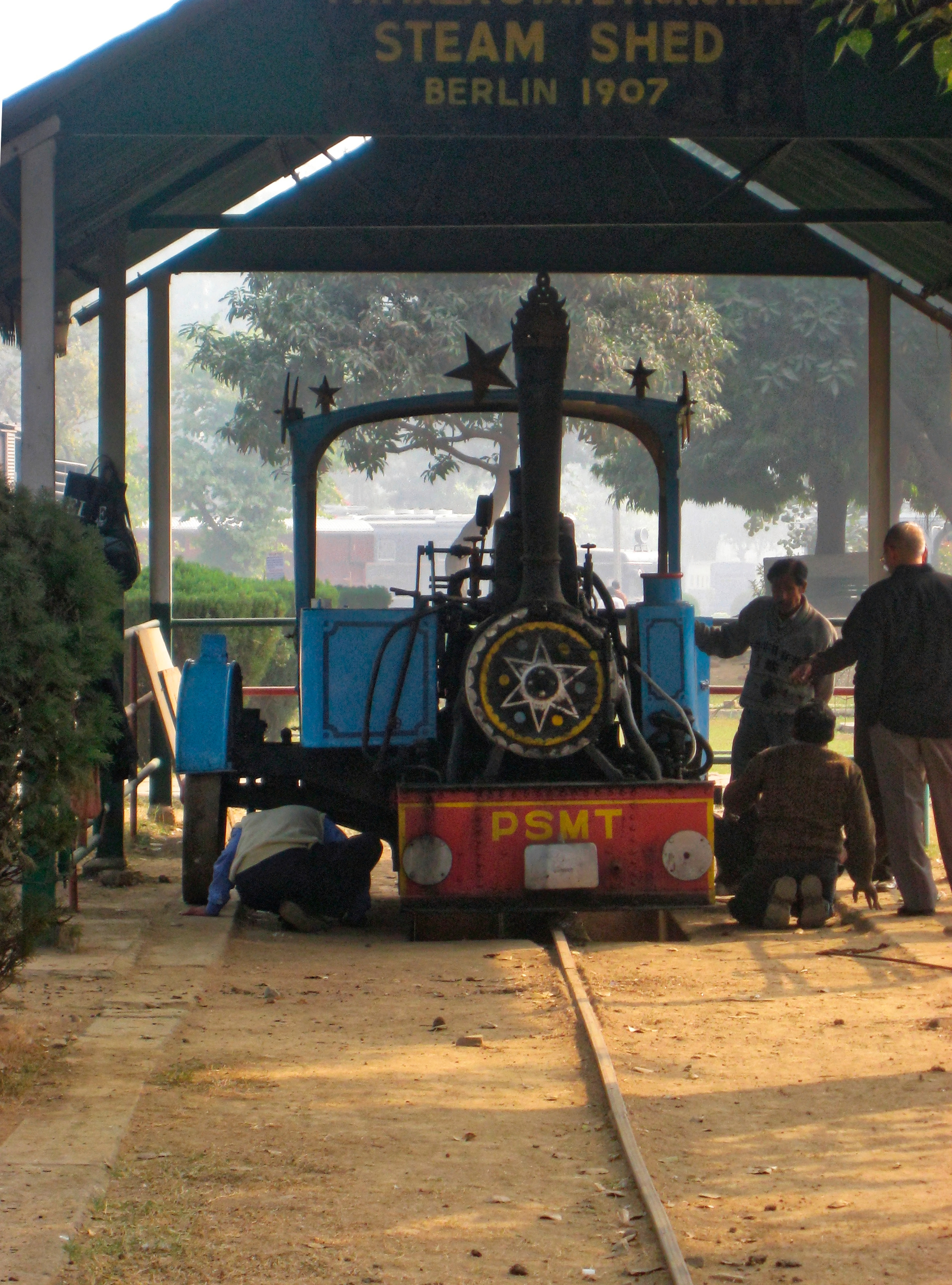
PSMT in shed

== See also ==
- Addis's Single Rail Tramway
- Caillet monorail
- Gyro monorail
- Ewing System
- Larmanjat guided rail system
- Monorail
- National Rail Museum, New Delhi
