= Charles W. Bowles =

British civil engineer

Colonel Charles William Bowles (30 September 1877 – 14 September 1966) was a British civil engineer for Patiala State Monorail Trainways commissioned by Maharaja Bhupinder Singh of Patiala.

Before starting work on Patiala State Monorail Trainways, Bowles was appointed by the British as an engineer in the Bengal Nagpur Railway Company Bowles was in charge of constructing its workshops, houses, schools, churches, hospitals, armory, recreational facilities and a jail, which once held two very important Indian political prisoners, Subhas Chandra Bose and Jawaharlal Nehru.

Bowles experimented with using the Ewing System for transporting construction material during the laying of railway tracks for Bengal Nagpur Railway Company. This experiment allowed him to perfect the monorail based on the Ewing System which he subsequently used to construct the Patiala State Monorail Trainways at Patiala.

Bowles, who was born in Homerton, died in 1965 in Gloucestershire, England.
