= National Rail Museum, New Delhi =

Coordinates: 28°35′05″N 77°10′53″E

National Rail Museum
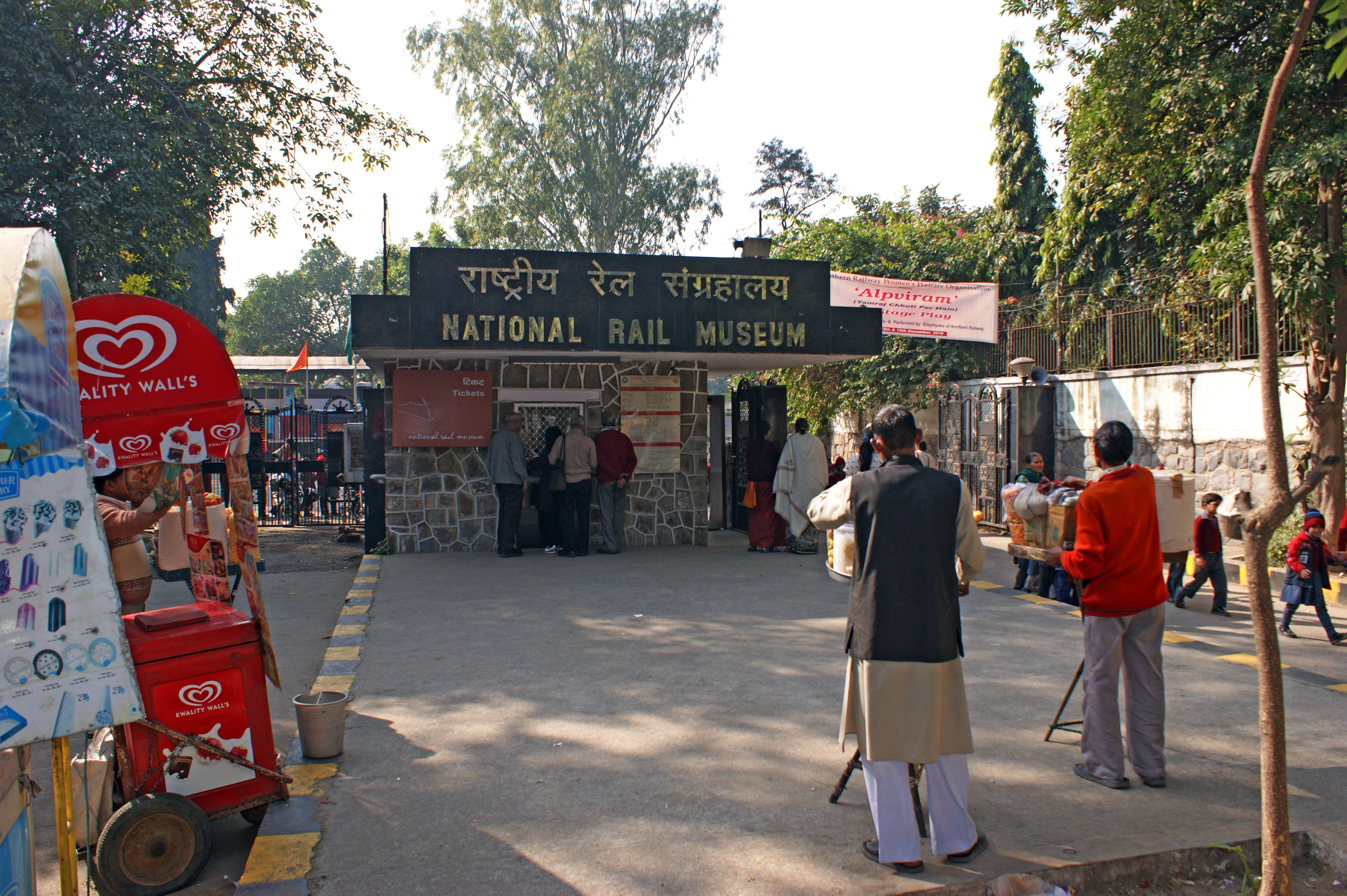
- National Rail Museum entrance, New Delhi
- Former name: Rail Transport Museum
- Established: 1 February 1977; 49 years ago
- Location: Chanakyapuri, New Delhi
- Type: Rail museum
- Website: www.nrmindia.org

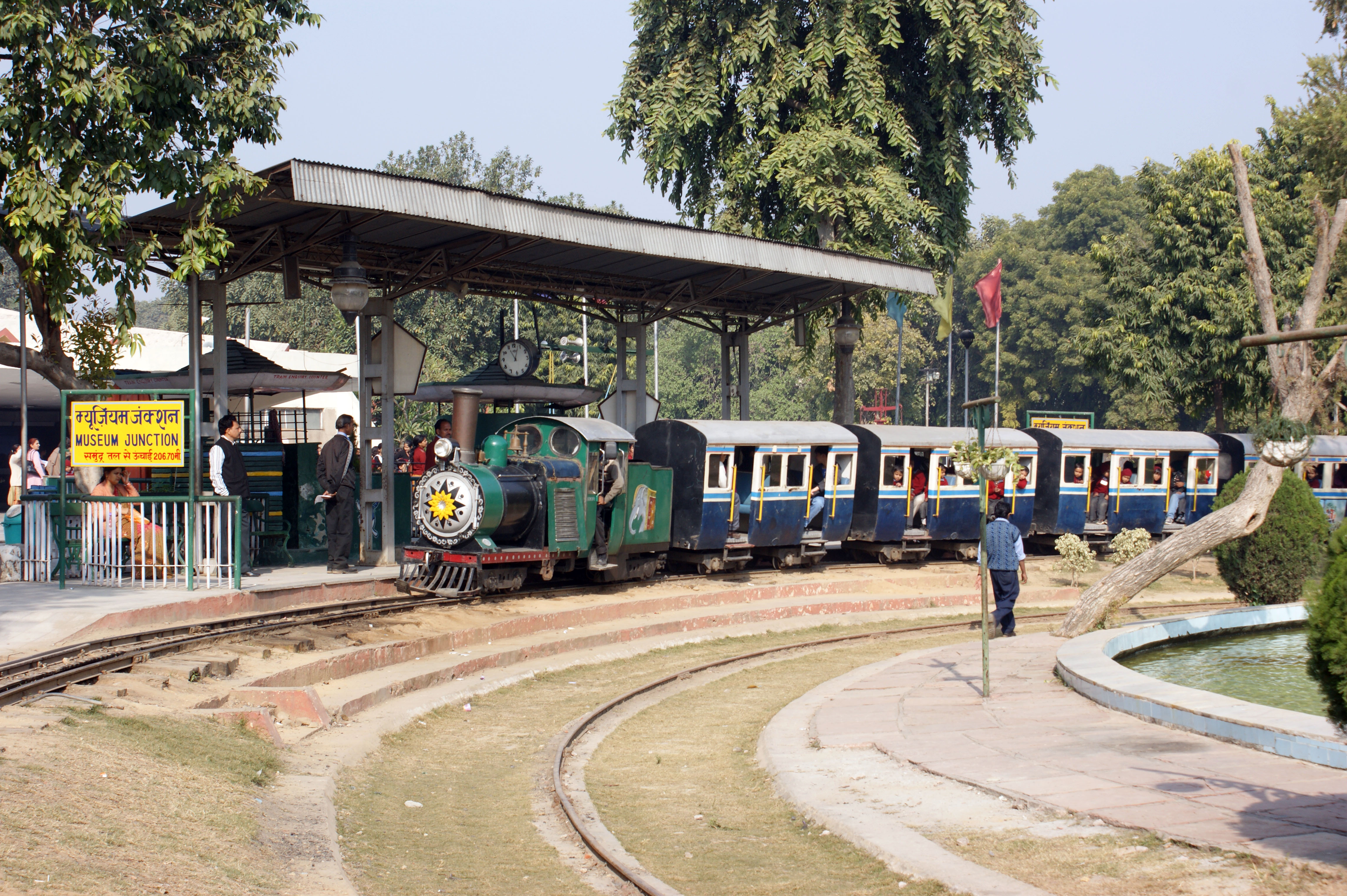
A mini-train, halted at the Museum Junction railway station, takes visitors on a tour around the museum.

The National Rail Museum in Chanakyapuri, New Delhi, displays exhibits on the history of rail transport in India. The museum was inaugurated on 1 February 1977. The museum spans over an area of over 4.4 hectares (11 acres) and the indoor gallery comprises an octagonal building which houses six display galleries and a large open area is laid out to simulate the atmosphere of a railway yard. It is open every day except Mondays and national holidays.

== History ==
A Transport Museum was first proposed in 1962, under the advice of rail enthusiast Michael Graham Satow. The proposal took a concrete shape in 1970 and on 7 October 1971 the foundation stone was laid at the museum's present site in Chanakyapuri, New Delhi, by the then-President of India, V. V. Giri. The museum was inaugurated as the Rail Transport Museum in 1977 by Kamalapati Tripathi, the minister for public transportation.

The museum was originally intended to be a part of a larger museum that covered the history of railways, roadways, airways, and waterways in India; however, this never happened and it was officially renamed the National Rail Museum in 1995. A renovation programme began in 2015. By May 2018, additions included a refurbished indoor gallery, virtual-reality coach simulators, and diesel and steam locomotive simulators.

== Ticket Fare ==
Ticket price of National Rail Museum, New Delhi.

S No.	Type	Adult (12 Years & Above)		Child (03-12 years)	
S No.	Type	Weekday (in Rs.)	Weekend (Sat + Sun) & Gazetted Holiday (in Rs.)	Weekday (in Rs.)	Weekend (Sat + Sun) & Gazetted Holiday (in Rs.)
1.	Entry	50/-	100/-	10/-	20/-
2.	Museum Express	20/-	50/-	10/-	20/-
3.	1:8 Toy Train	100/-	200/-	100/-	200/-
4.	Coach Simulator	100/-	200/-	100/-	200/-
5.	Steam Simulator	150/-	300/-	150/-	300/-
6.	Diesel Simulator	150/-	300/-	150/-	300/-
7.	PSMT Steam	200/-	200/-	200/-	200/-

== Facilities ==
Auditorium: The museum has a state of the art auditorium with seating capacity of 200 persons.

VIP Lounge: The museum has a state of the art air-conditioned conference hall with seating capacity of 20-25 persons.

The Rails: The Rails is a restaurant situated in the museum. It is housed in a replica the Chhatrapati Shivaji Terminus main building dome. The restaurant depicts the formation of Indian Railways through unification of 42 independent railway companies held by the princely states of India and British East Indian Company. The Maharaja of Gwalior had a silver model train that ran along the banquet table and served food to the royal guests. The restaurant replicates this by making a steam locomotive chug around the restaurant and serve food at tables named after historic stations in the country.

Souvenir shop: There is a souvenir shop where small scale models of rolling stock, books, apparels, frame and prints, etc. are available for sale.

== Exhibits ==
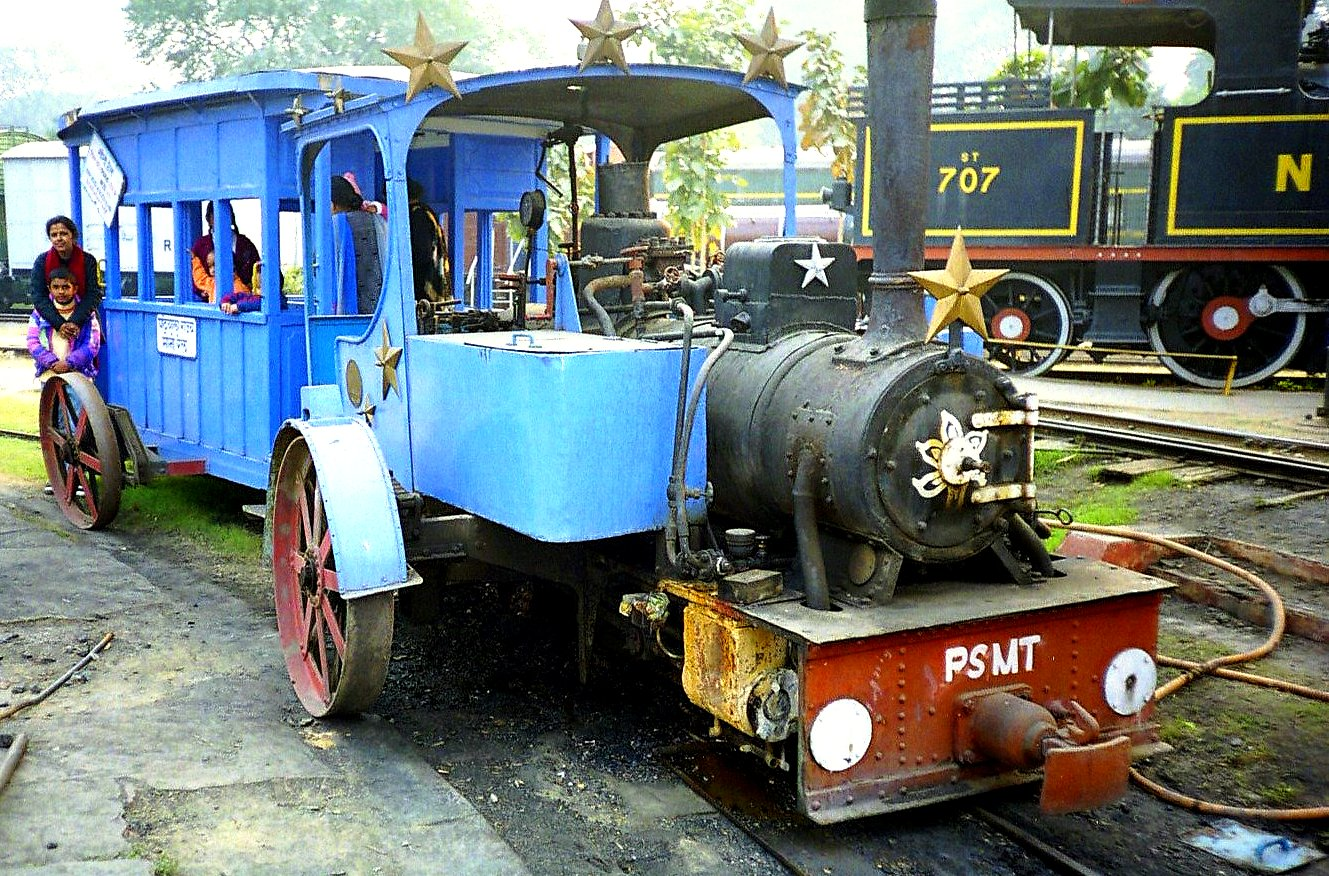
The Patiala State Monorail

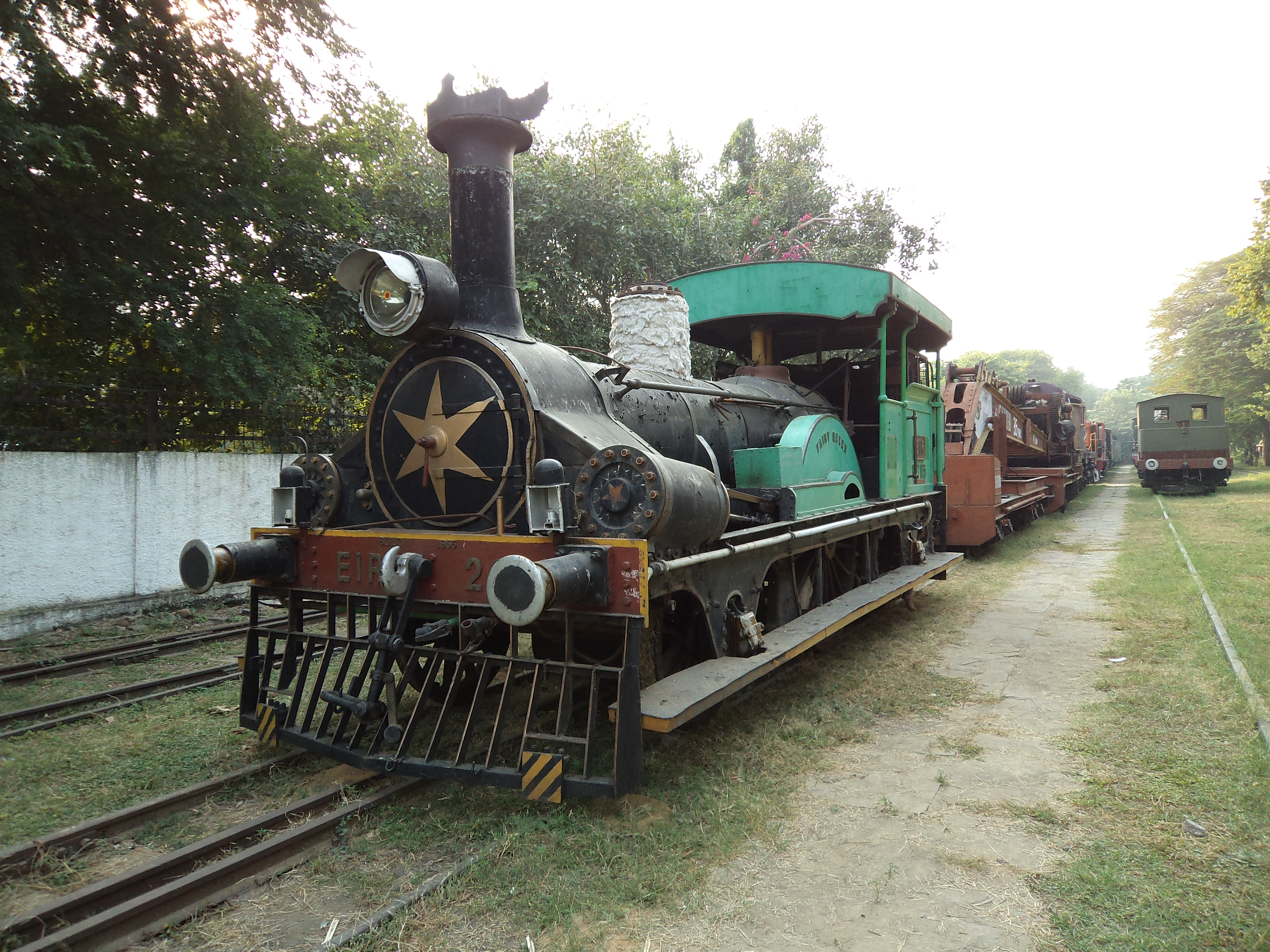
The Fairy Queen steam locomotive.

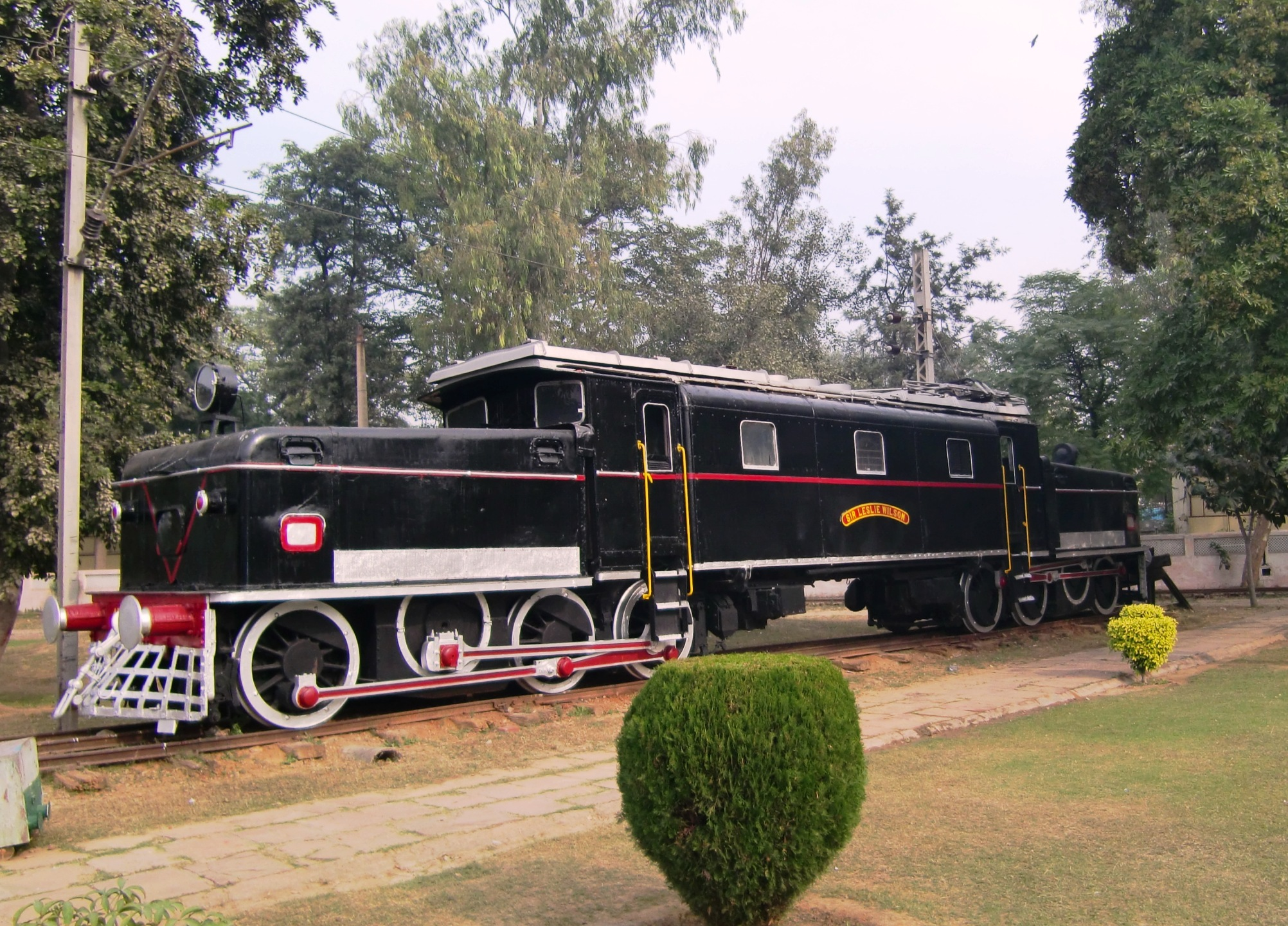
Electric locomotive 4502 Sir Leslie Wilson

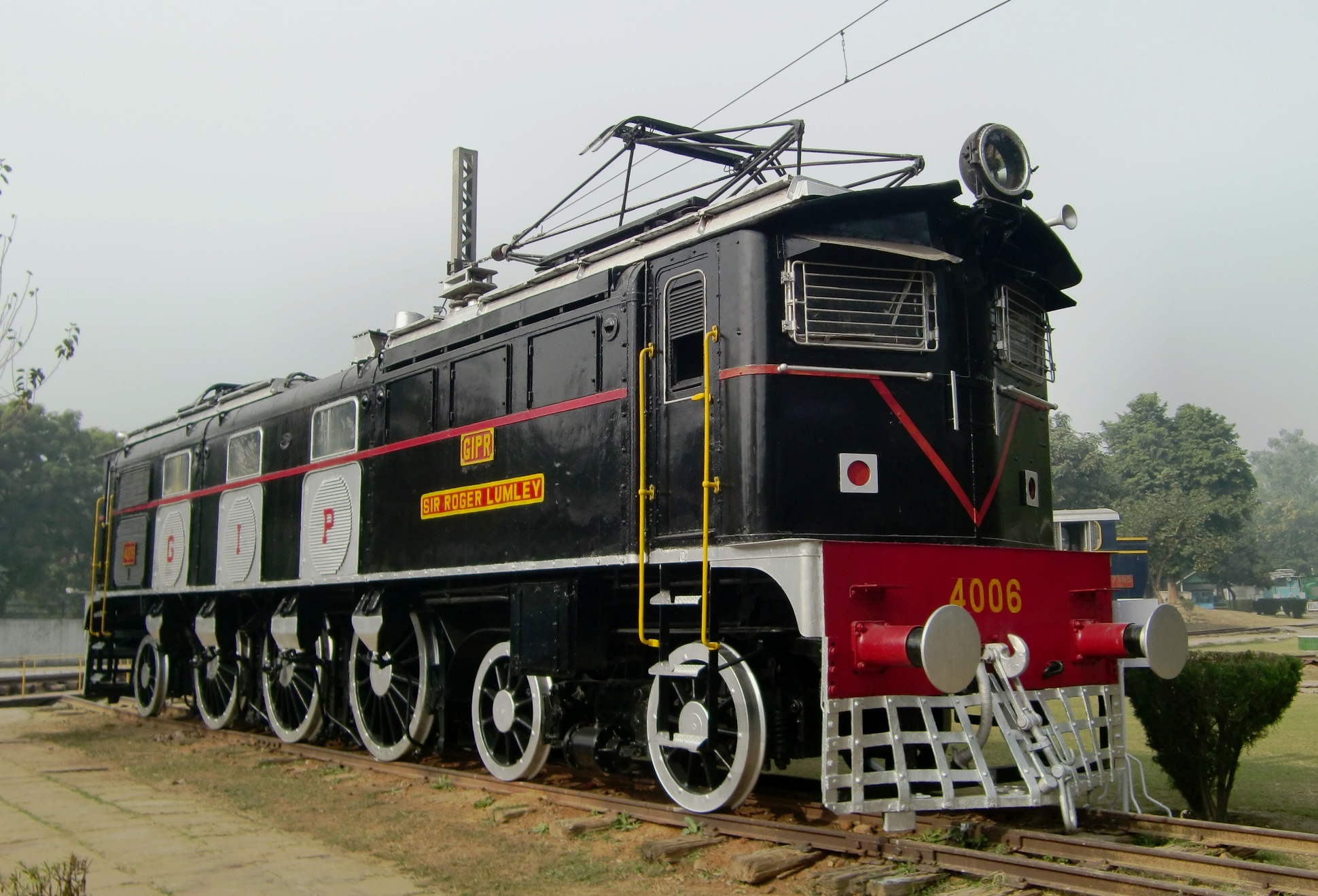
Electric locomotive 4006 Sir Roger Lumley

=== Locomotives ===
- Patiala State Monorail Trainways: This unique steam monorail was built in 1907. The train is based on the Ewing System and connected the town of Bassi with the city of Sirhind-Fatehgarh, approximately 9.7 km (6 mi) apart. This unique train system consists of a single-rail track on which the load-carrying wheel runs, while large iron wheels on either side keep the train upright. The train was built by Orenstein & Koppel of Berlin and ran until October 1927 when the line was closed. The engine and the chief engineer's inspection car remained in the railways' scrapyard where they were discovered by railroad historian Mike Satow in 1962. One of the engines was restored to full working order by the Northern Railway Workshops in Amritsar. The Chief Engineer's private inspection car was also reconstructed on an old under-frame. The two are now in working condition and are on display at the museum.
- Fairy Queen: The world's oldest working steam locomotive in operational service. It is taken out on heritage runs several times a year.
- Electric locomotive 4502 Sir Leslie Wilson: This 1928 WCG-1 locomotive belonged to the Great Indian Peninsular Railway (presently Central Railway). It is one of India's first generation 1,500 V DC electric locomotives, which were known as khakis (English: crabs) since they make a curious moaning sound when at rest, and while in motion the linkage emits an unusual swishing sound. Its unusual features included an articulated body, which made it ideal for use in heavily curved sections of the Ghat mountains. The WCG-1 was in operation as a shunting locomotive until 1994 at Mumbai's Chhatrapati Shivaji Terminus
- Electric locomotive 4006 Sir Roger Lumley: This WCP-1 locomotive has a unique wheel arrangement. These locomotives were supplied by the Vulcan Foundry, UK, in 1930. They were electric locomotives operating under 1,500 V DC. They are known for hauling the Mumbai–Pune Deccan Queen in its early years. A prototype of this locomotive is also on display at the Nehru Science Centre in Mumbai.
- Fireless steam locomotive: A 1953 manufactured locomotive that worked without any fire required normally for steam engines to function. Instead of using fire to create high pressure steam, the steam was prefilled in the pressure vessel by a static boiler.
- Steam locomotive A885 HASANG
- Steam locomotive X37385: This locomotive was used for trains to Ooty.
- Betty Tramways (Fowler Diesel): This locomotive ran in Rajkot and was owned by Rajkot-Beti Tramways.
- DHR Locomotive E-207
- F1-734: India's first indigenously built Locomotive
- SMR 37302 Locomotive
- BB&CI Locomotive 162 M
- Locomotive Sentinel
- JR Locomotive HP 31412
- Bengal Nagpur Railway Locomotive RD 688
- BNR Beyer Garatt Locomotive: A locomotive that functioned on the Bengal Nagpur Railway, this was among the longest locomotives ever used in India. It was used in the Ghat sections, and was reputed to carry heavy loads at high speeds, even on inclines. It was an articulated locomotive, and hence could navigate steep turns easily.
- DHR B777 Locomotive
- ER 775 CS Locomotive
- Locomotive WR 594 WT
- BB&CI Locomotive 31652

=== Saloons/ coaches ===
- Saloon of The Maharaja of Indore: This was the saloon car of Maharaja of Indore.
- Saloon of The Maharaja of Mysore: This was the saloon car of the Maharaja of Mysore. The saloon is designed using teak, gold, ivory, and other materials.
- Viceregal Dining Car: The Dining car of the Viceroy
- Gaekwar's Baroda State Railway Saloon: A saloon built for the Gaekwars of the state of Baroda in the present day Gujarat. It was built in the Parel Locomotive Workshop in Bombay of the BB&CI Railway, in the 1880s.
- Saloon of The Prince of Wales: This saloon car was built for the Prince of Wales (later King Edward VII) for his visit to India.
- Barshi Light Railway Coach
- Bhavnagar State Railway Coach
- Matheran and DHR Coaches
- EIR Sheep Van
- GIP Railway Dynamometer Coach
- Presidential Saloon

=== Miscellaneous ===
- 65t Capacity Crane
- John Morris-Belsize Fire Engine: built by the fire engineers John Morris and Sons Salford/John Morris and Sons Ltd of Salford, Greater Manchester, on a Belsize chassis, in 1914. The only other John Morris-Belsize fire-engine known to exist is a larger 6 cylinder model which is preserved by the Whitewebbs Museum of Transport, Enfield. London. This is in full working order - it was converted to use pneumatic tyres,(as this was required by British traffic regulations in the early 1930s), whilst the fire engine in Delhi runs on the original type of solid rubber tyres.

== Gallery ==
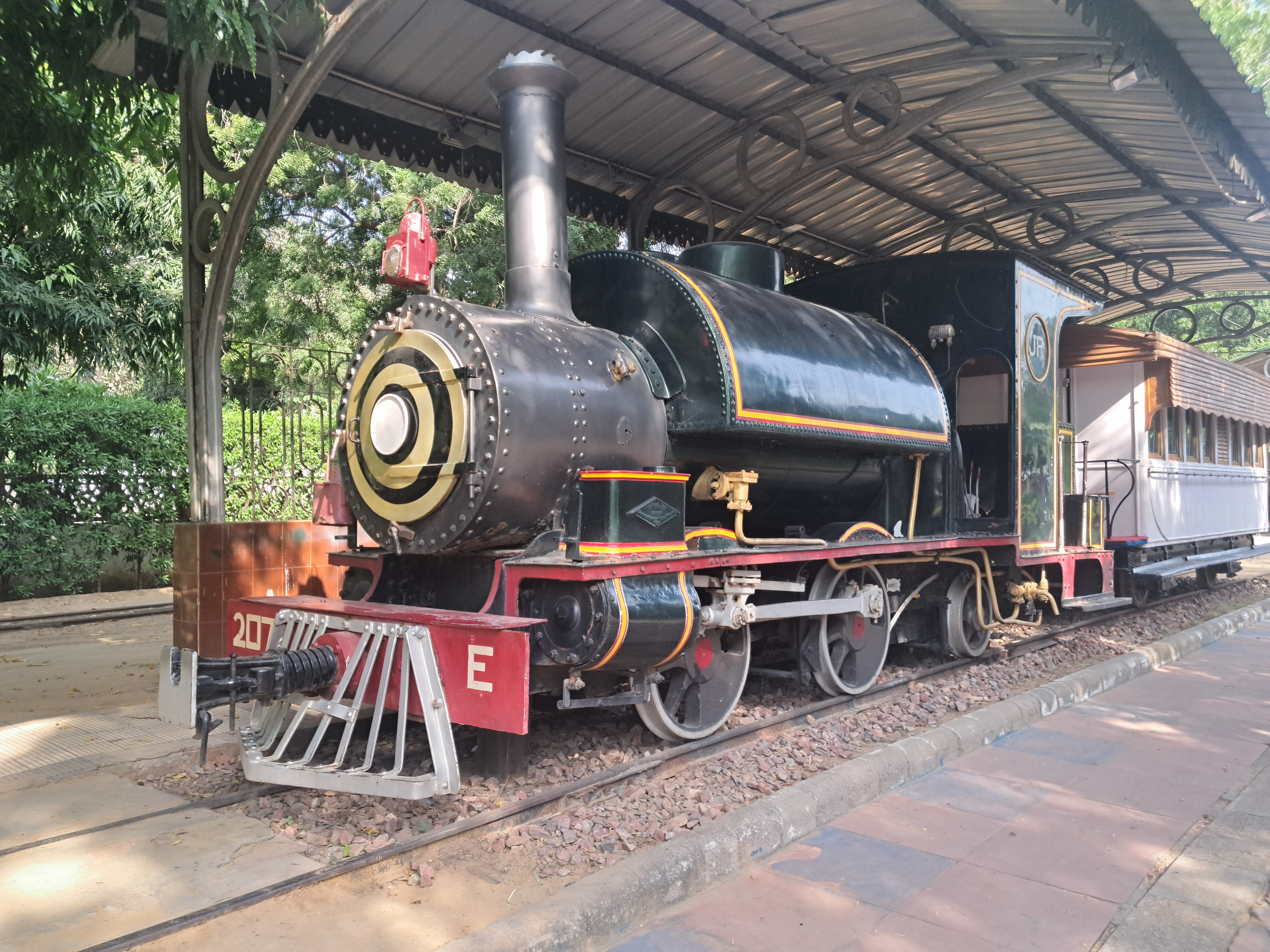
Locomotive E-207 at NRM.

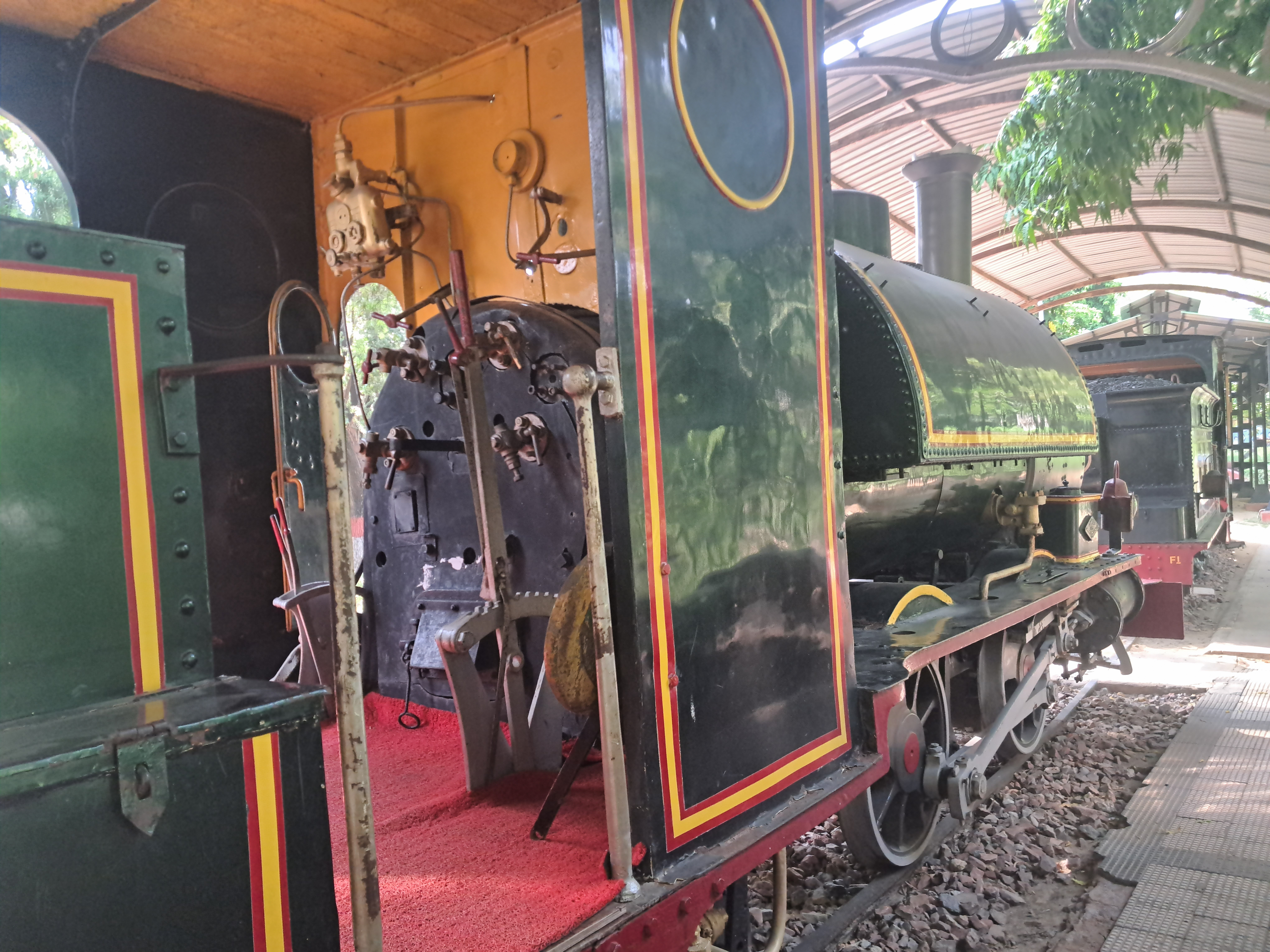
Interior of E-207

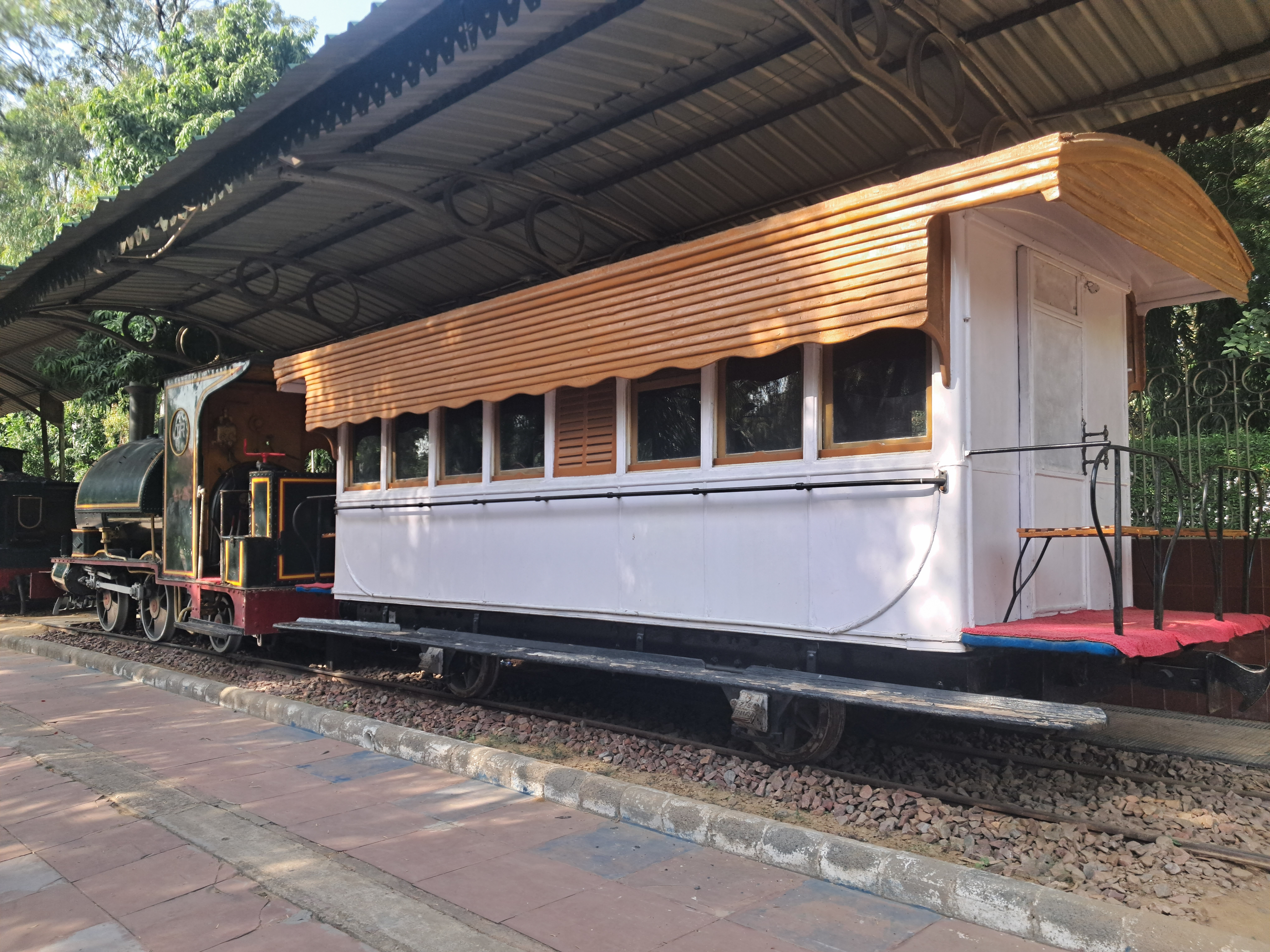
The Prince of Wales Saloon

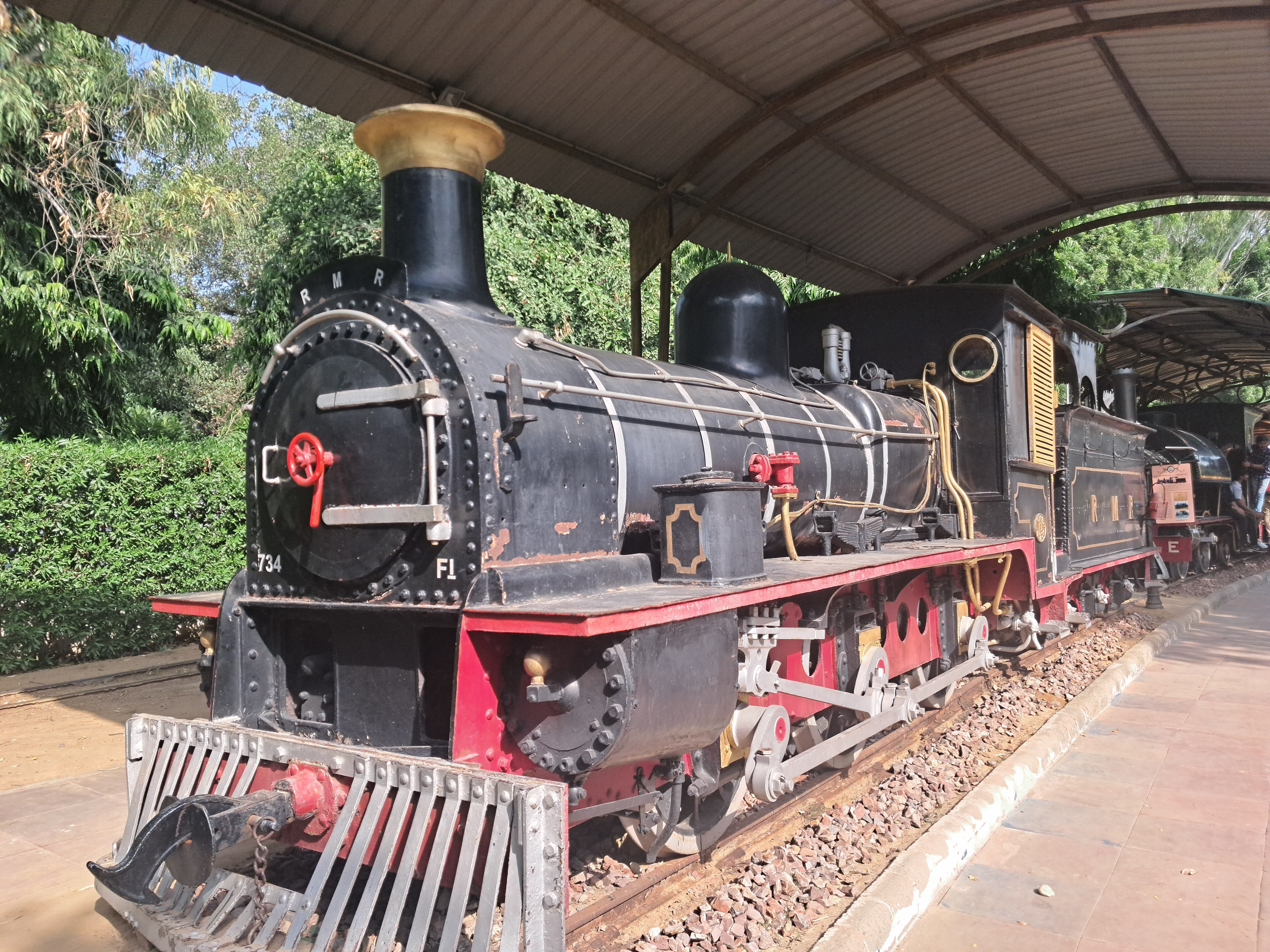
Locomotive F1-734

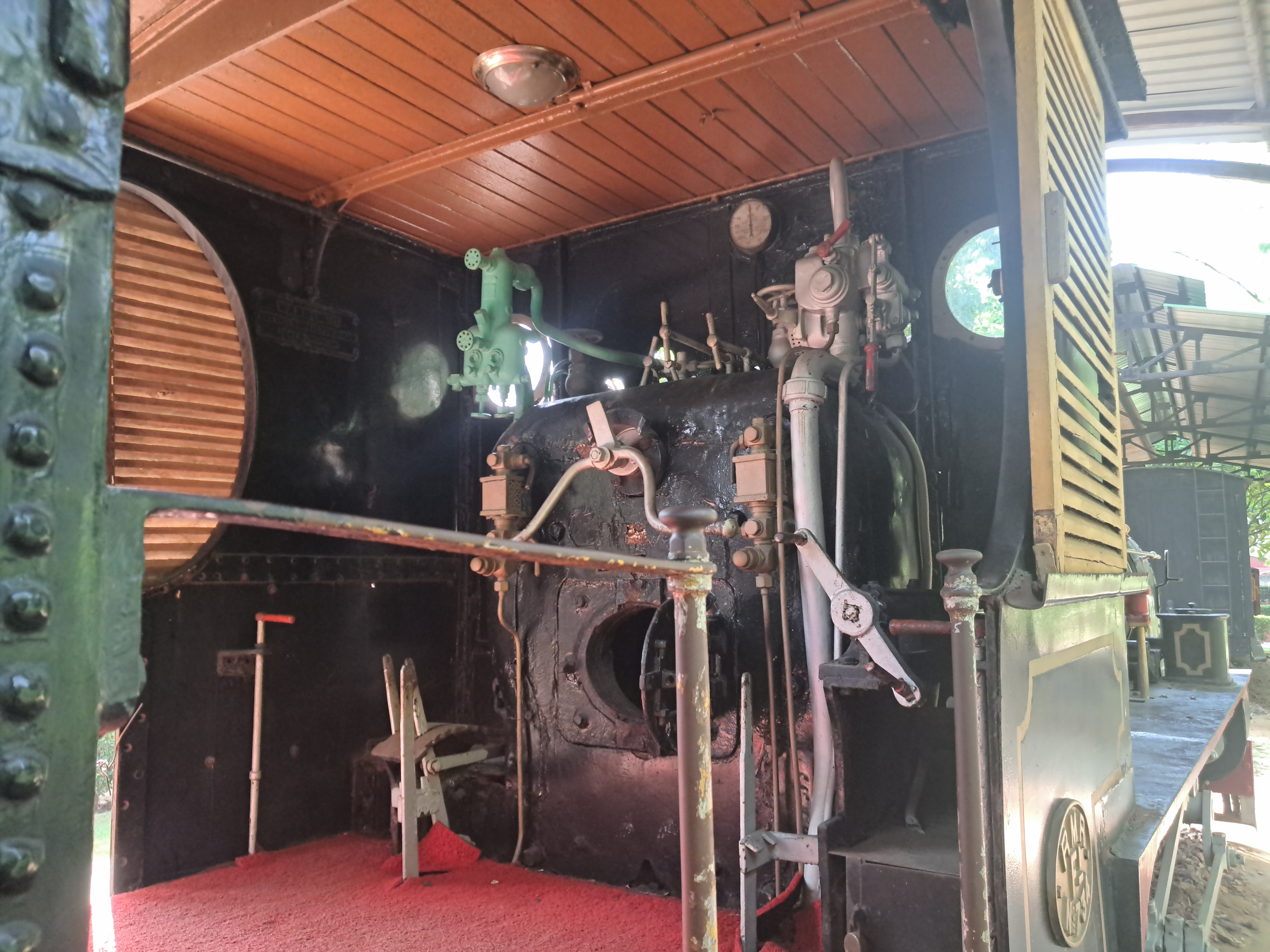
F1-734 Interior

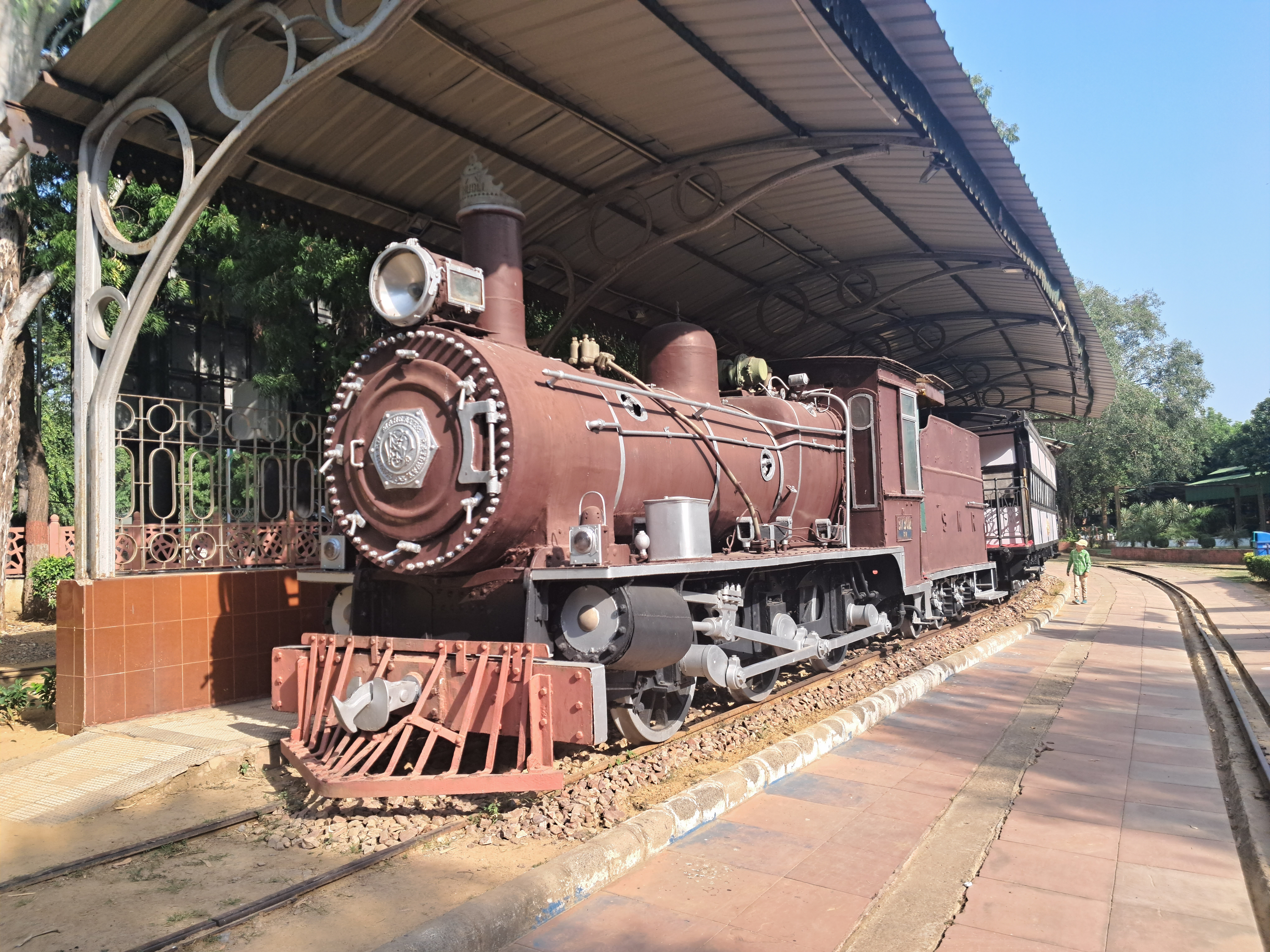
Locomotive SMR no.37302

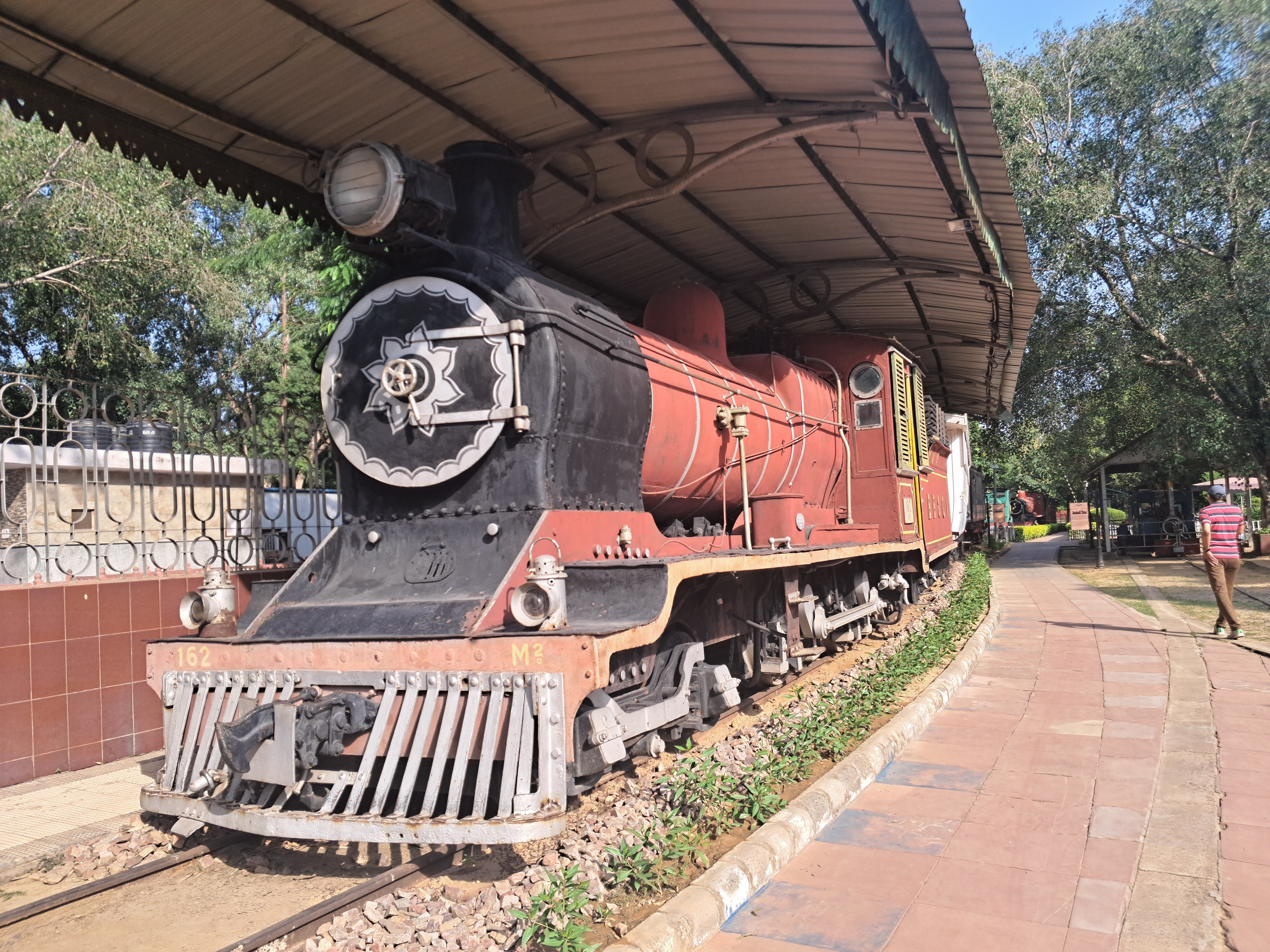
BB&CI Locomotive no. M2 162

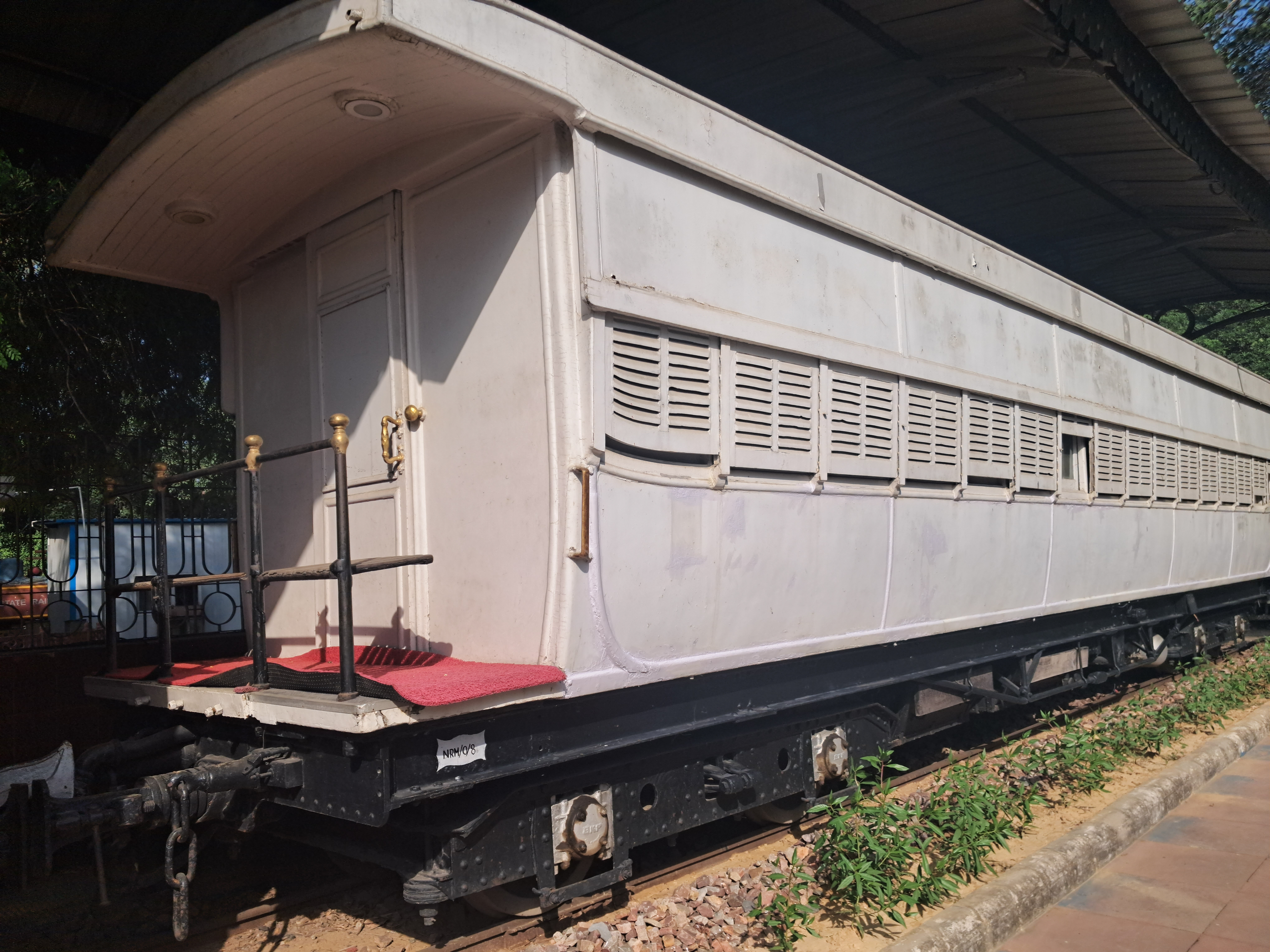
Viceregal Dining Car

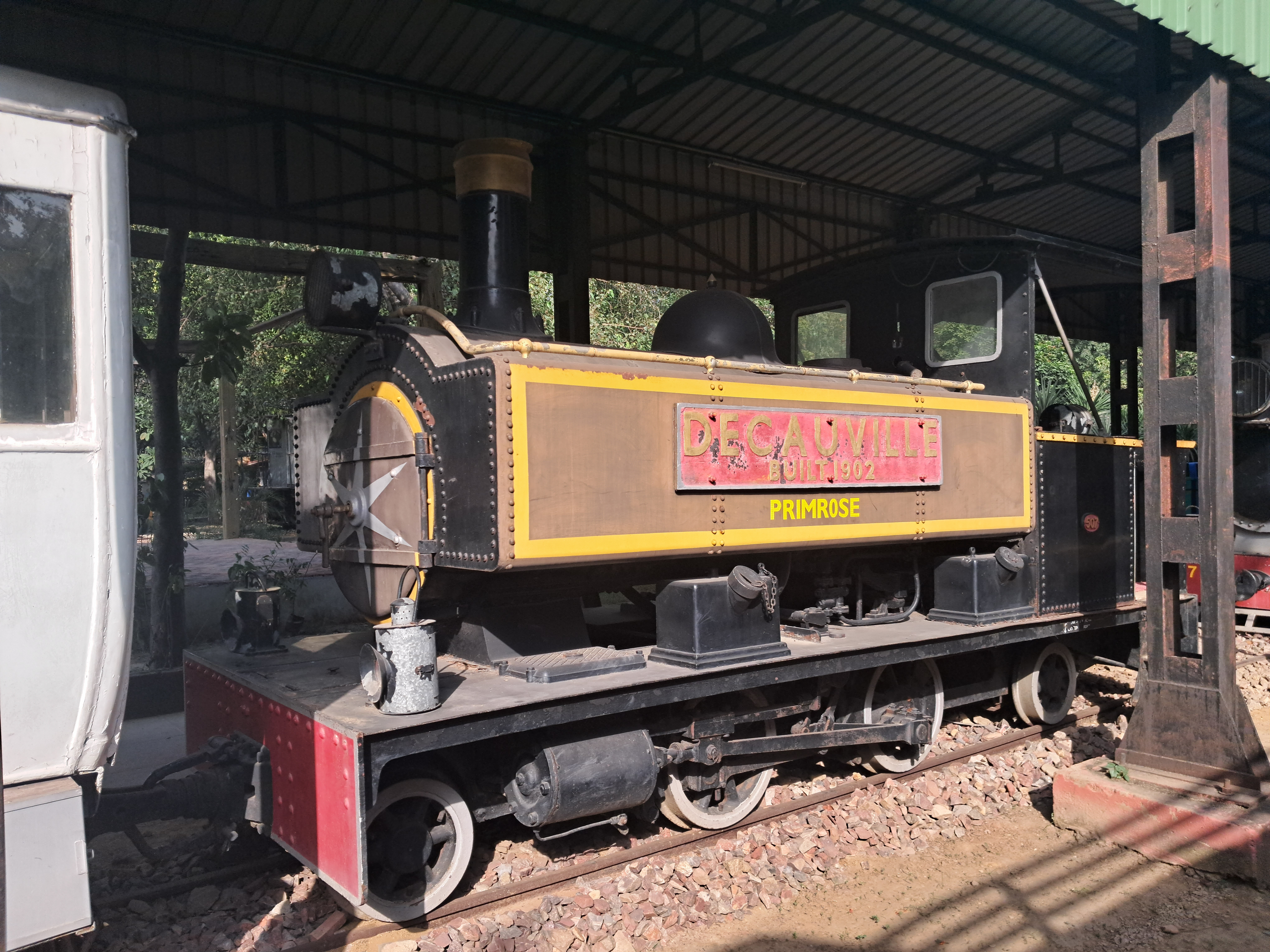
Locomotive Decauville

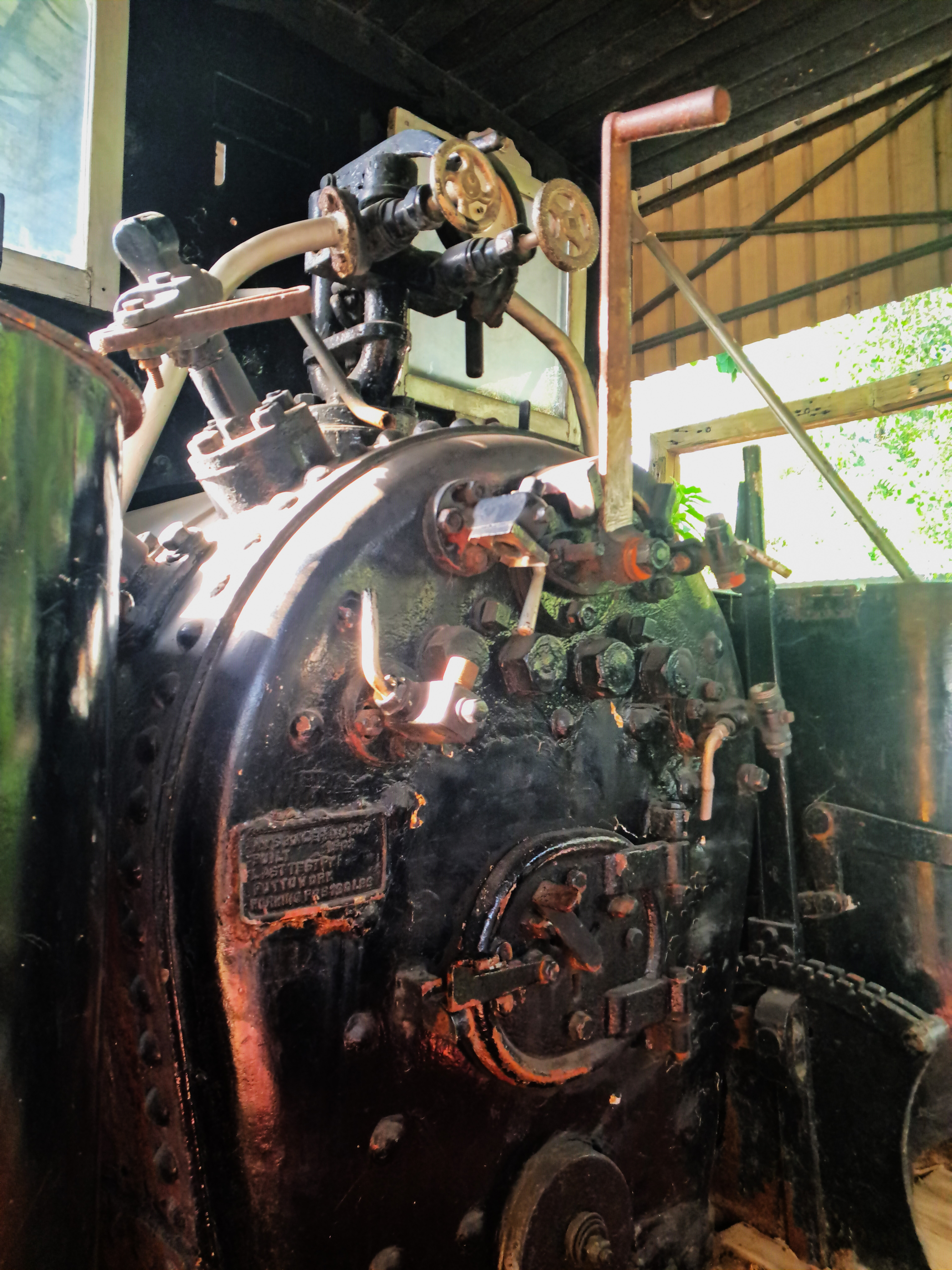
Locomotive Decauville Cabin interior

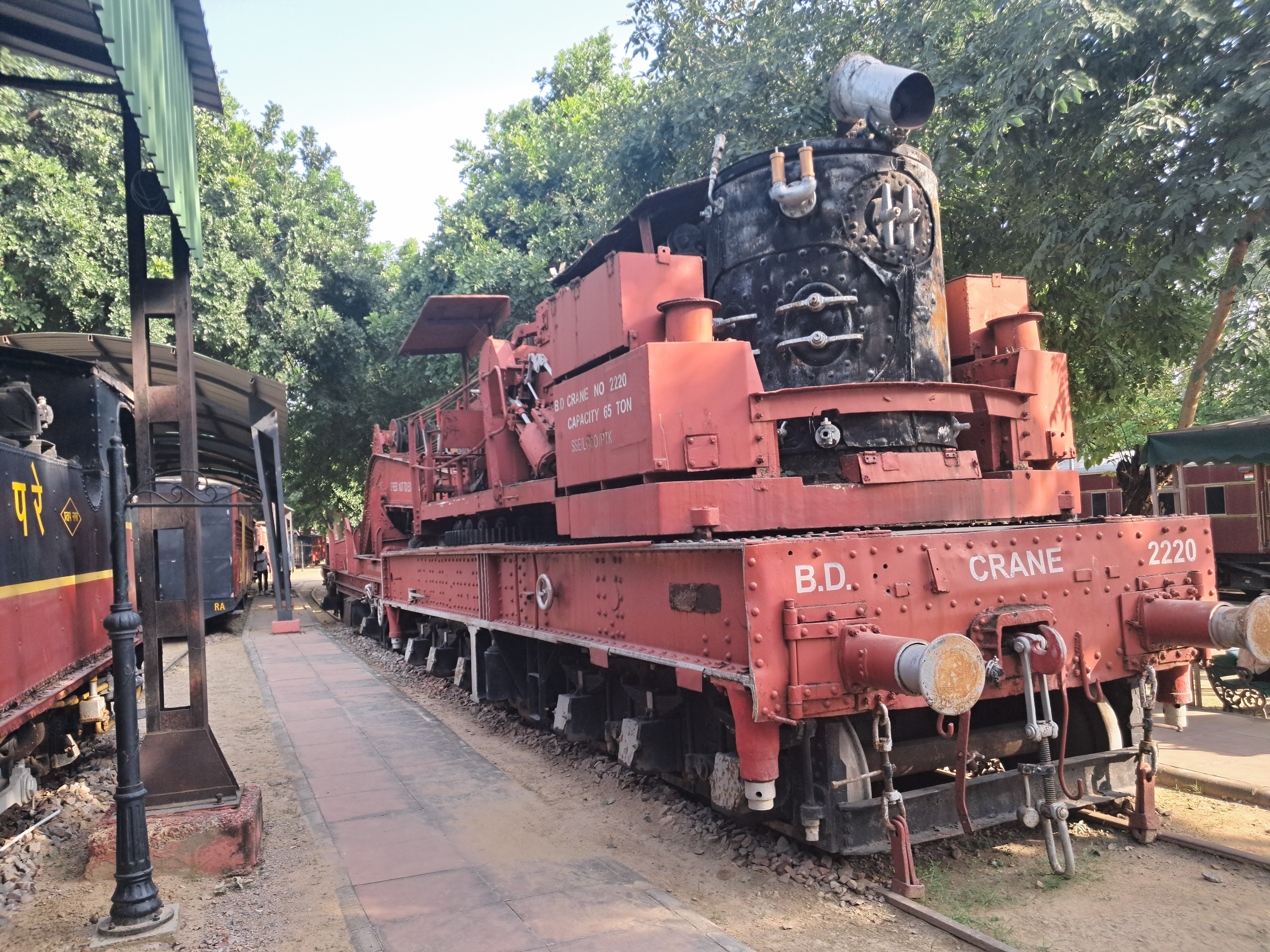
65t Capacity Crane at NRM

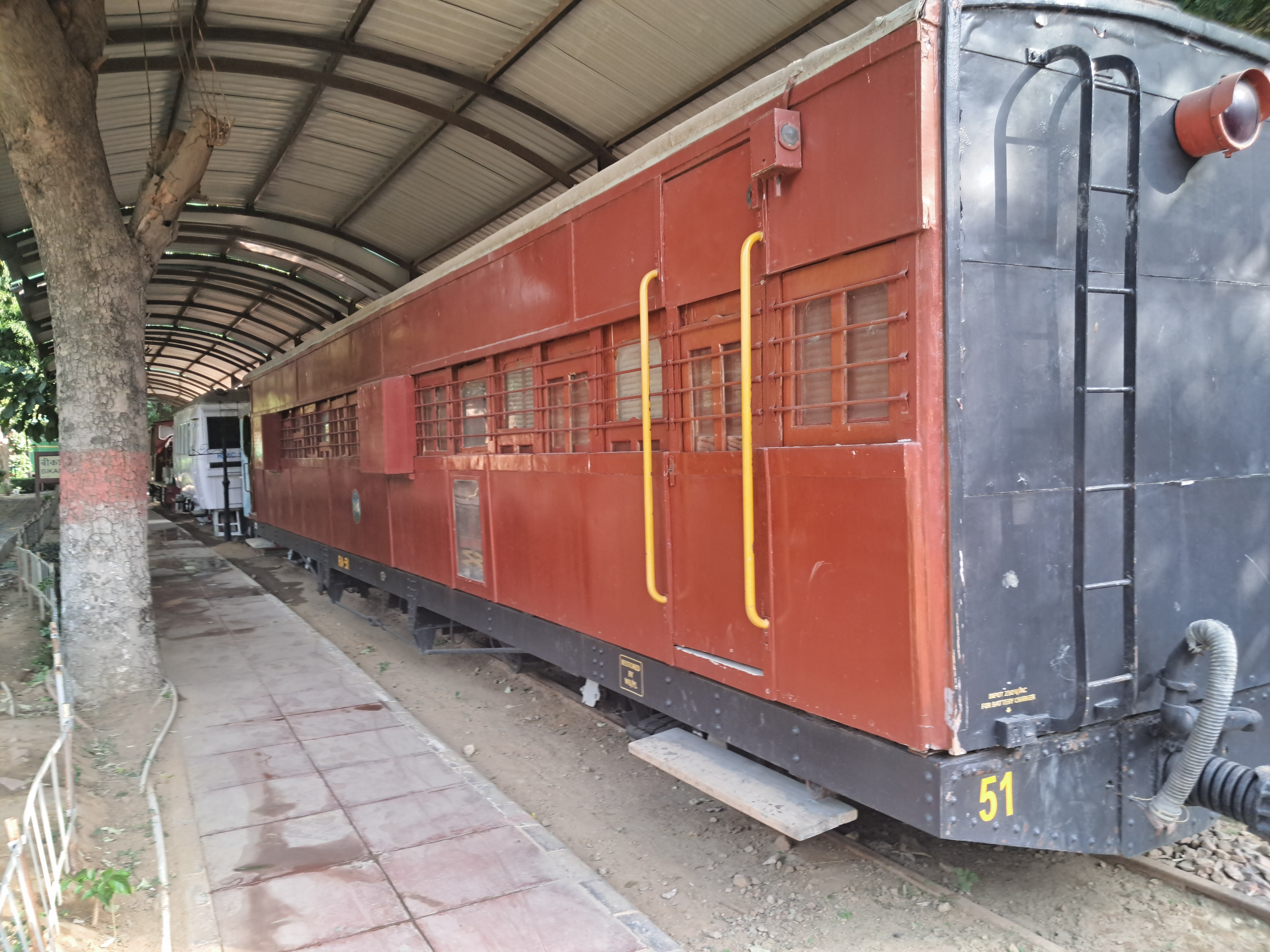
Bhavnagar State Railway Coach

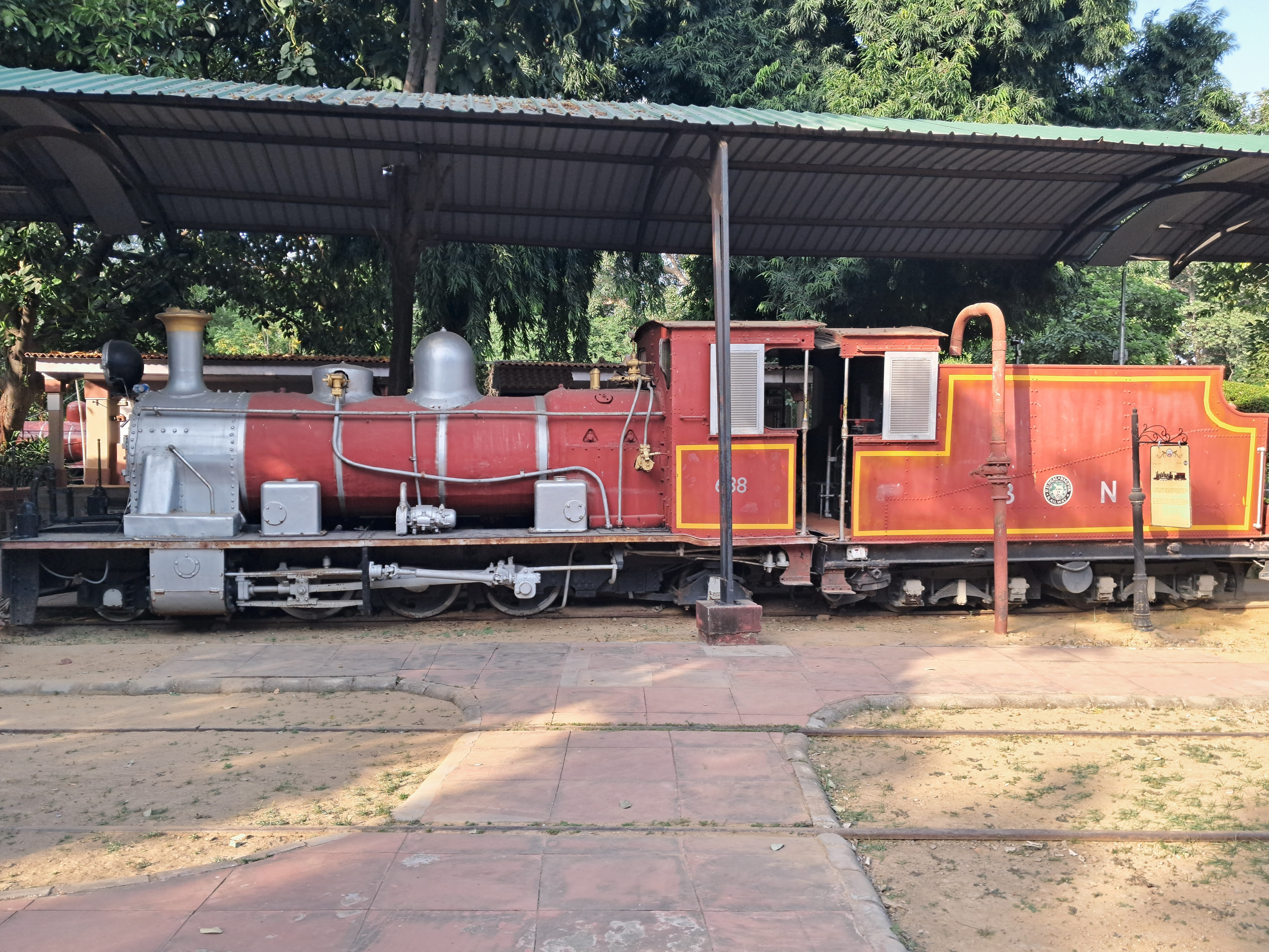
BNR Locomotive no. Rd 688

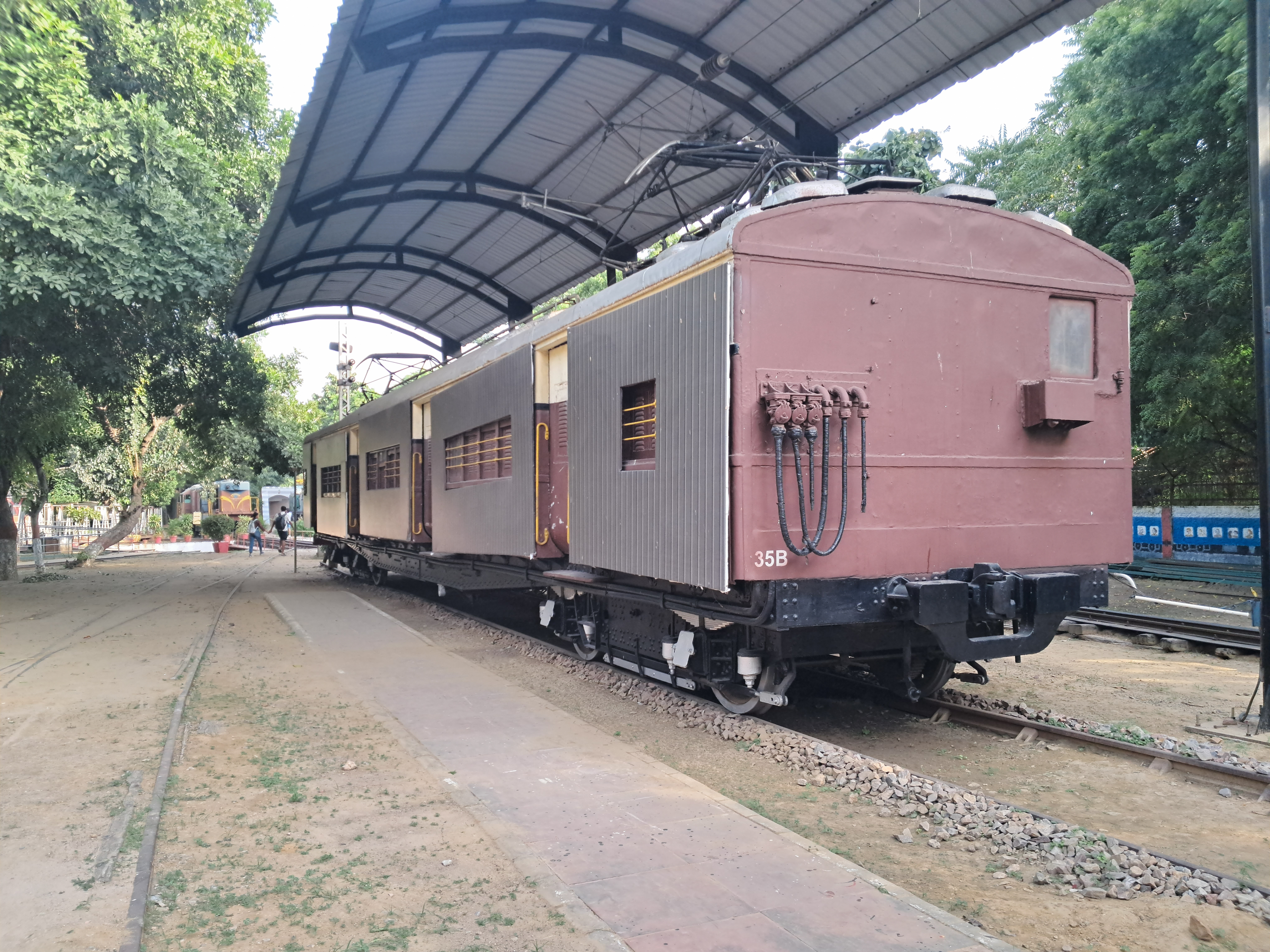
BB&CIR EMU Coach no. 35B at NRM

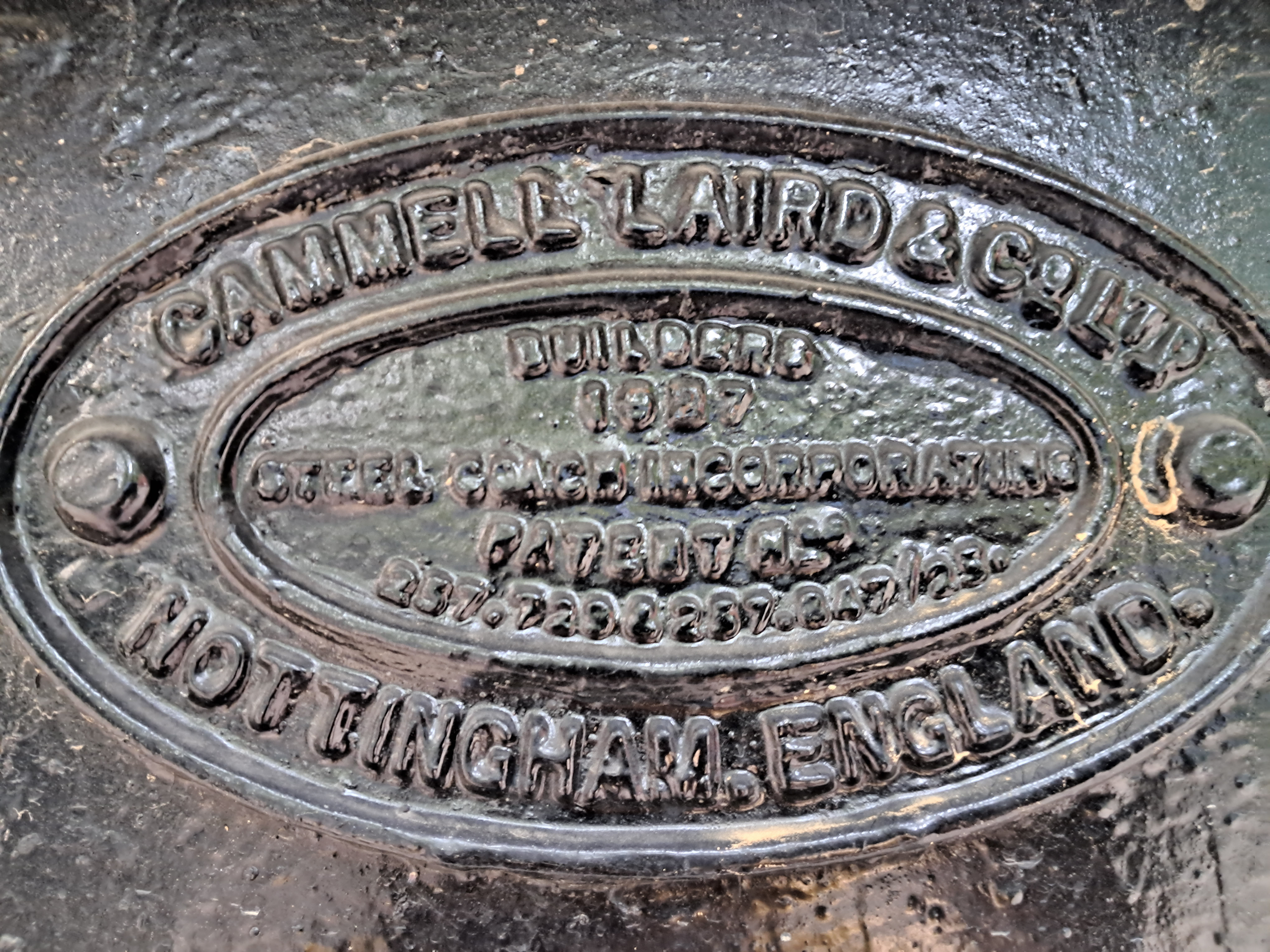
Plaque of the BB&CI EMU Coach

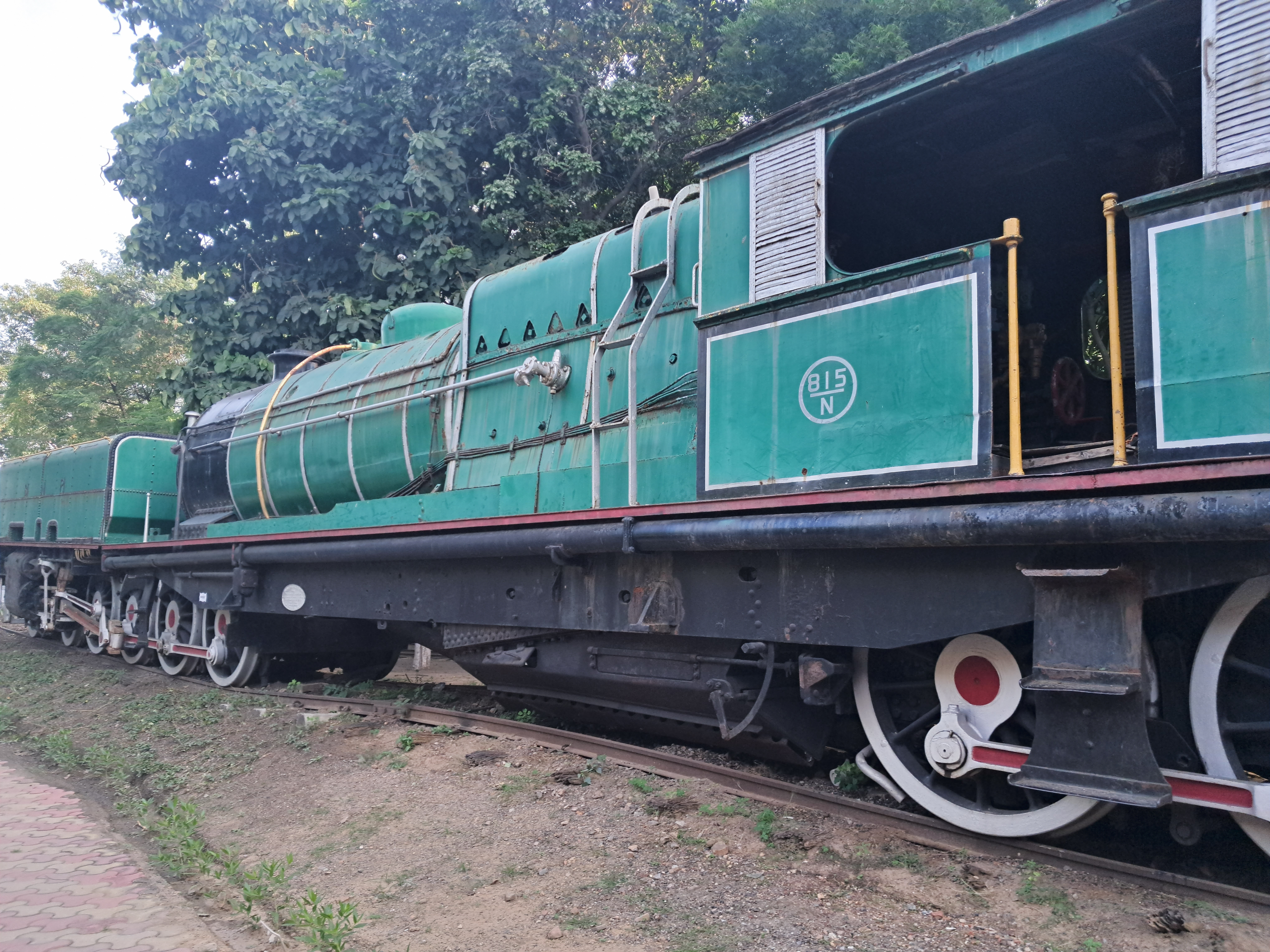
Beyer Garatt Locomotive at NRM (middle view).

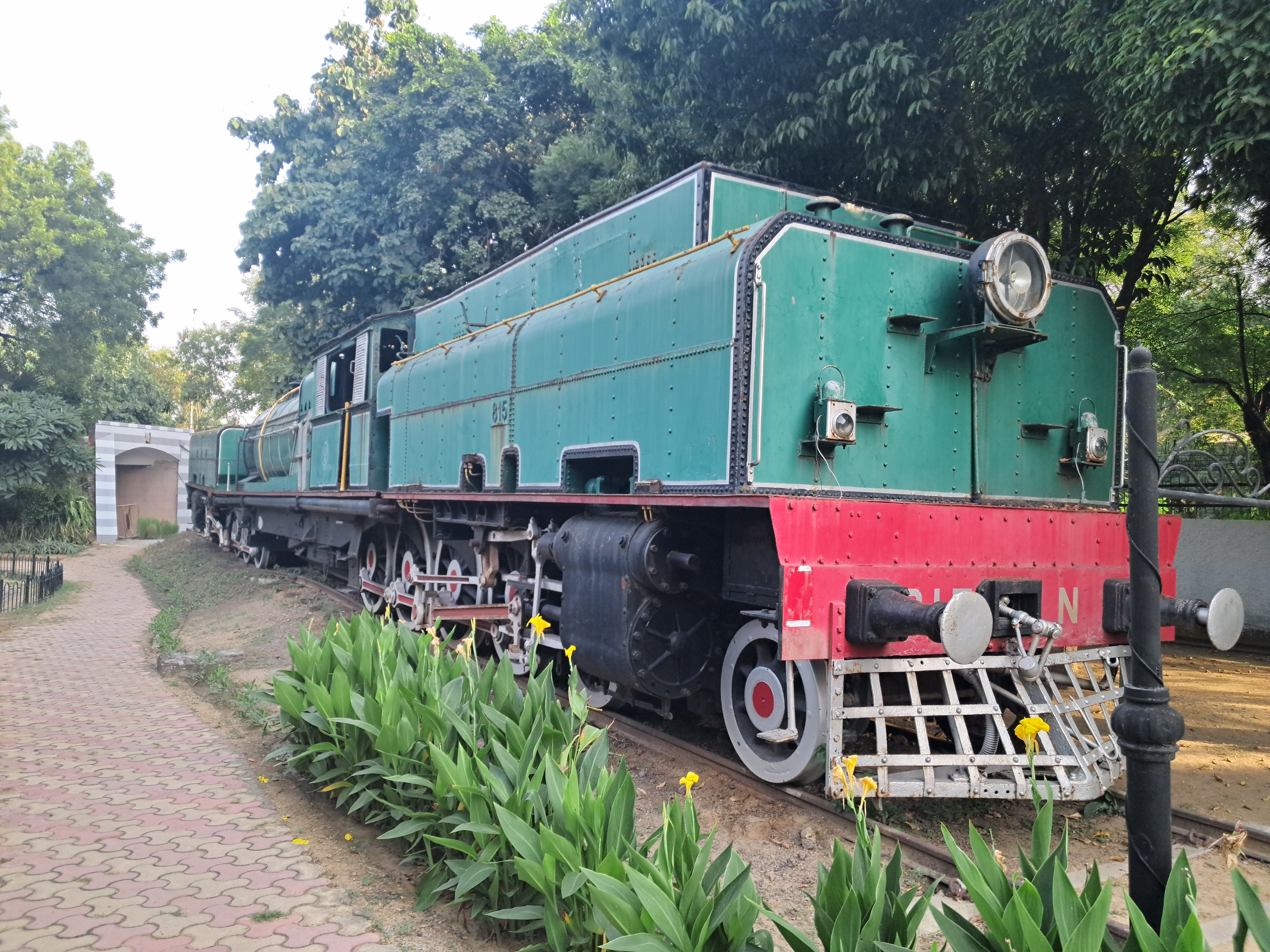
BNR Beyer Garatt, housed at the National Rail Museum in Chanakyapuri, New Delhi, India.

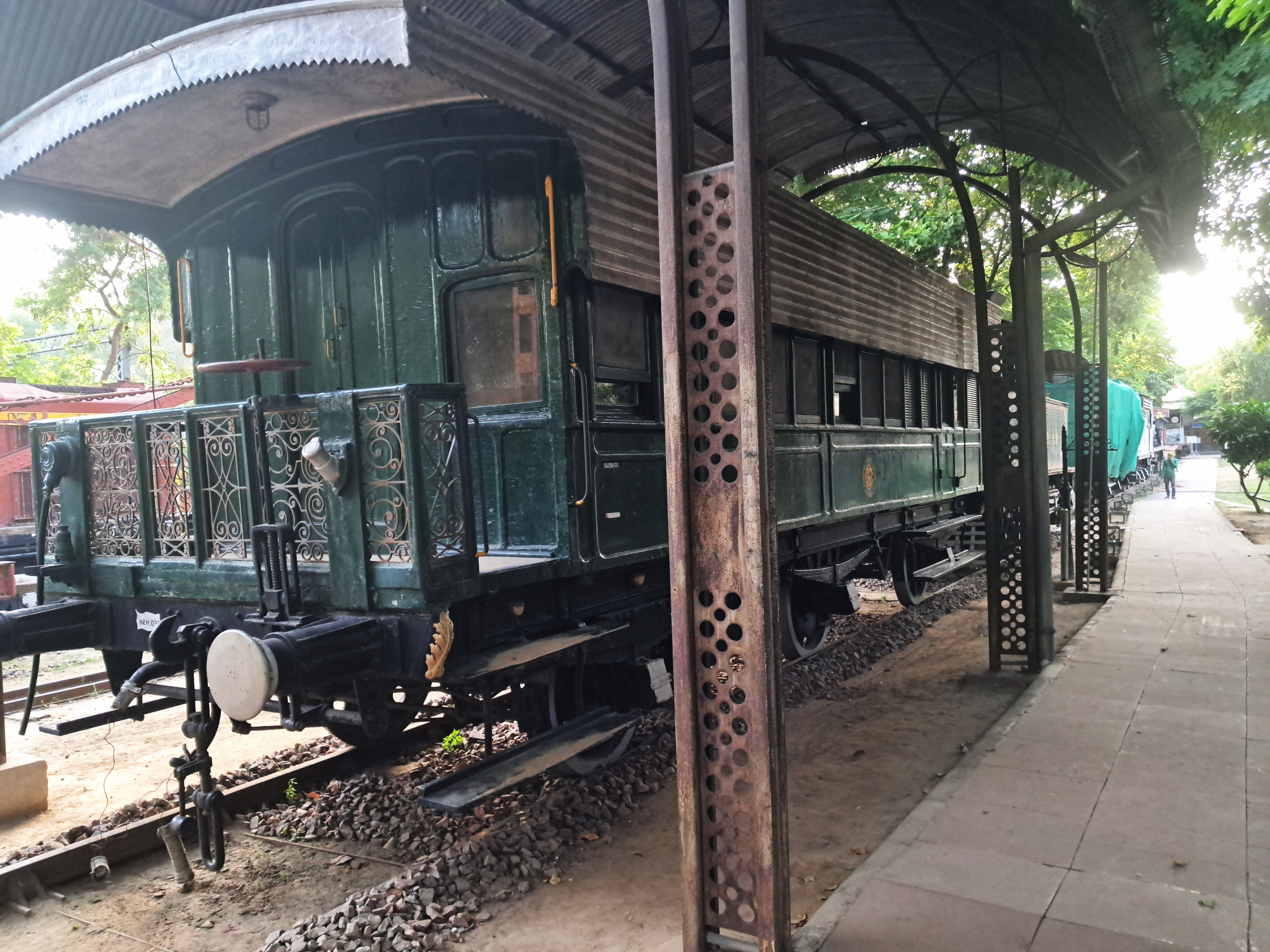
The Saloon Coach of the Gaekwar's Baroda State Railway.

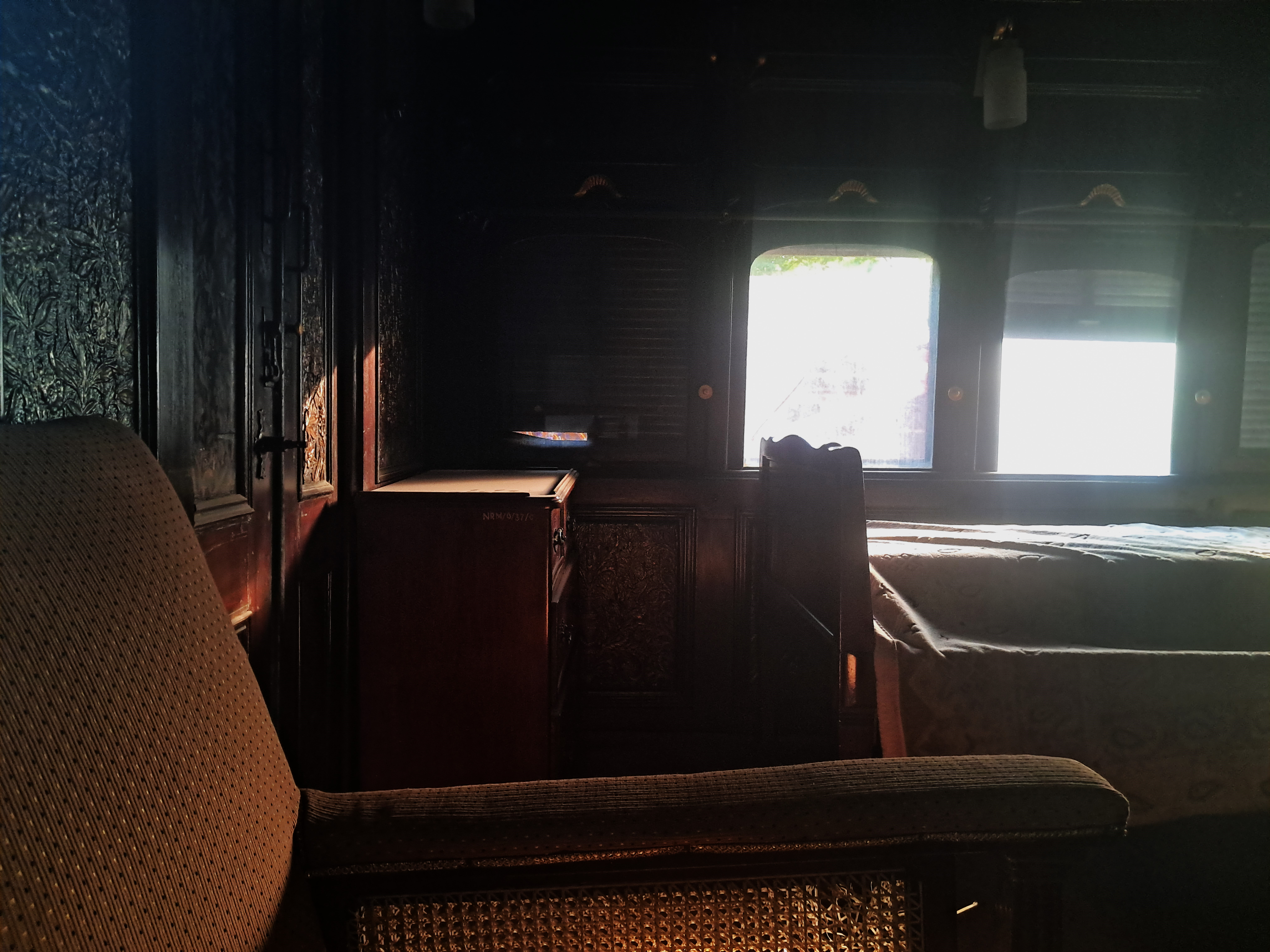
Interior of the Gaekwar's Baroda State Railway Saloon Coach.

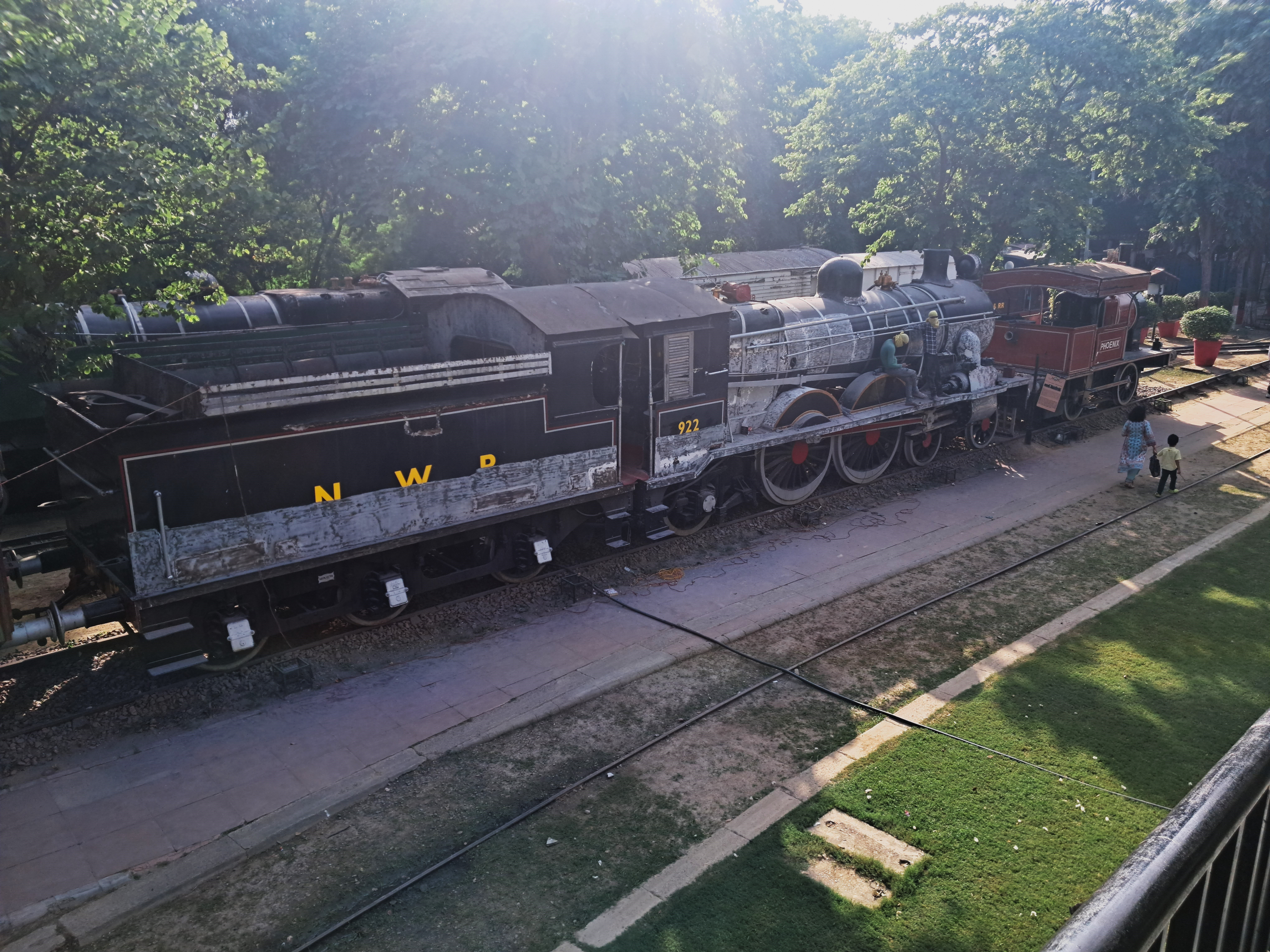
Restoration works at NRM.

== See also ==
- Rewari Railway Heritage Museum
- Regional Railway Museum, Chennai
- Railway Museum Mysore
- Railway Heritage Centre, Tiruchirappalli
- Joshi's Museum of Miniature Railway
