= Ewing System =

Balancing monorail system

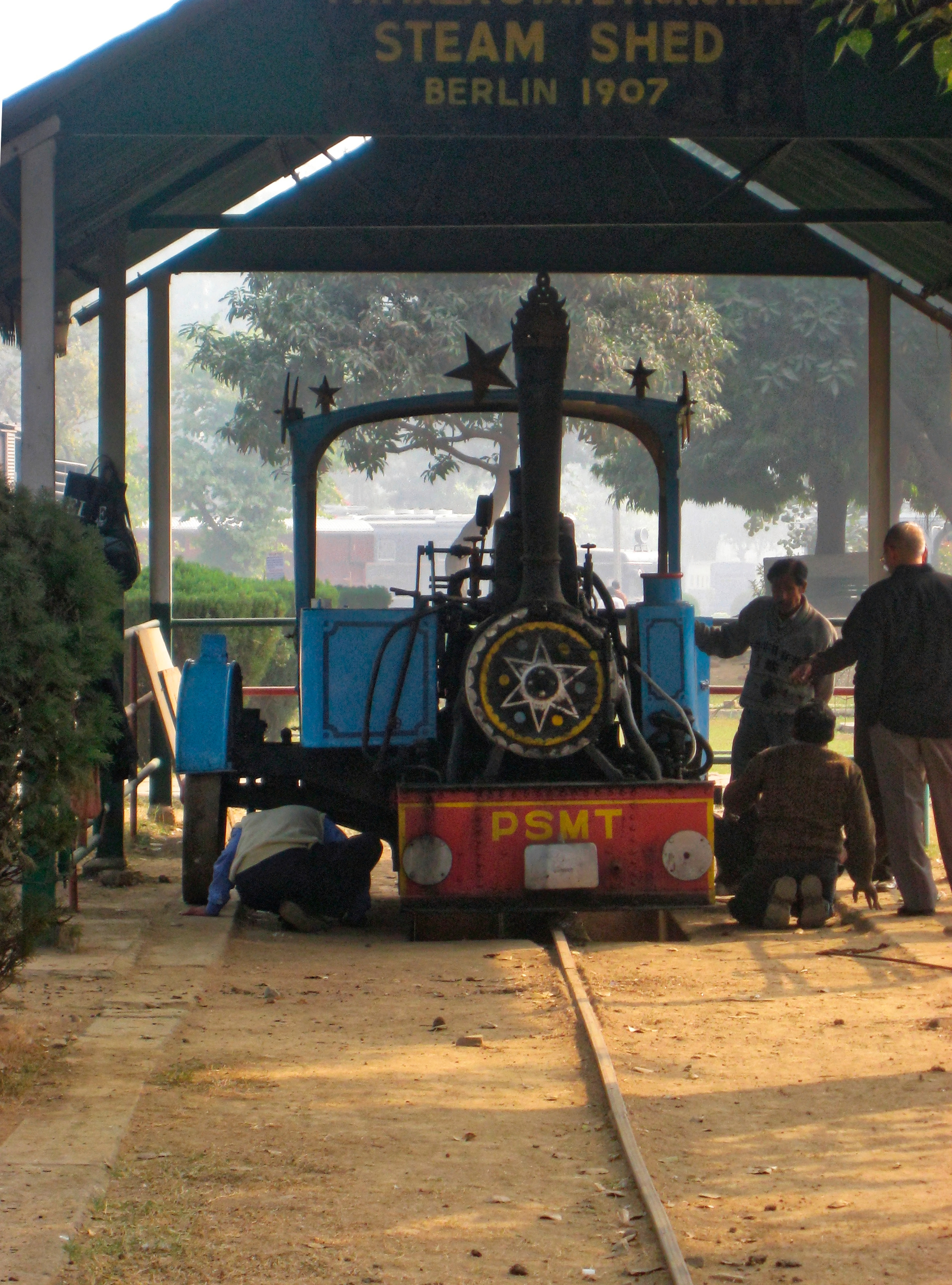
Patiala's Ewing System at the National Rail Museum, New Delhi

The Ewing System is a balancing monorail system developed in the late 19th century by British inventor W. J. Ewing. It is not to be confused with the much later system patented by Robert W. Ewing.

In the Ewing System the main wheels of the train run on a single steel rail. The system had been proposed in 1868 by William Thorold, a civil engineer from Norwich, Norfolk.

The major benefit of trains is that they run on steel rails. Steel rails can carry more load with less rolling friction than any other mode of ground transport. However there are several disadvantages of laying conventional two-rail tracks: Both rails have to rise and fall and bank together, laying two rails requires significant space and maintenance, and trains' turning radii are restricted by the difference in length or distance traveled between the inner and outer rails through curve resistance. Curve resistance means that the wheels on the inside rail travel a shorter distance than the outer wheels on curves. The trains can only turn however much the outer wheels can cope with the additional required speed. The train may derail if the outer wheels fail to maintain or reach that speed.

W.J. Ewing implemented a monorail system with double flanged rail wheels that had been proposed by William Thorold in a lecture to the British Association in 1868. This system avoided all those problems, and since it was laid out parallel to a road it took up very little land. Further, the road wheel's main purpose was to balance the train and to keep it upright. The balancing wheel carried only 4% or 5% of the load, thus not inhibiting the steel wheel-steel rail efficiency. As the track was on side of the road, it was no obstacle to vehicles crossing it and since it was a monorail with a supporting wheel on the ground, the issue of curve resistance did not occur.

The Ewing System was used on the Patiala State Monorail Trainways. The Patiala monorail is preserved in National Rail Museum at New Delhi in running condition. It was also used on Kundala Valley Railway from 1902 to 1908.
