= Kundala Valley Railway =

Monorail system in Kundala Valley, India (1902–1924)

Overview
- Area served: Madras Presidency
- Locale: Kerala & Tamil Nadu
- Transit type: Monorail (1902–1908); 2 ft (610 mm) narrow-gauge railway (1908–1924)
- Number of lines: 1
- Headquarters: Idukki, Munnar, Kerala, India

Operation
- Began operation: 1902; 124 years ago
- Ended operation: 1924; 102 years ago

Technical
- Track gauge: 610 mm
- Old gauge: Monorail (Nil Gauge)
- Electrification: No

Kundala Valley Railway was the first monorail system in India, later converted to a 2 ft (610 mm) narrow-gauge railway, that operated between Kundala Valley in Munnar, Idukki district of Kerala and Top Station in Theni district of Tamil Nadu, India. The railway line had 35 km length.

== History ==
=== Monorail (1902–1908) ===
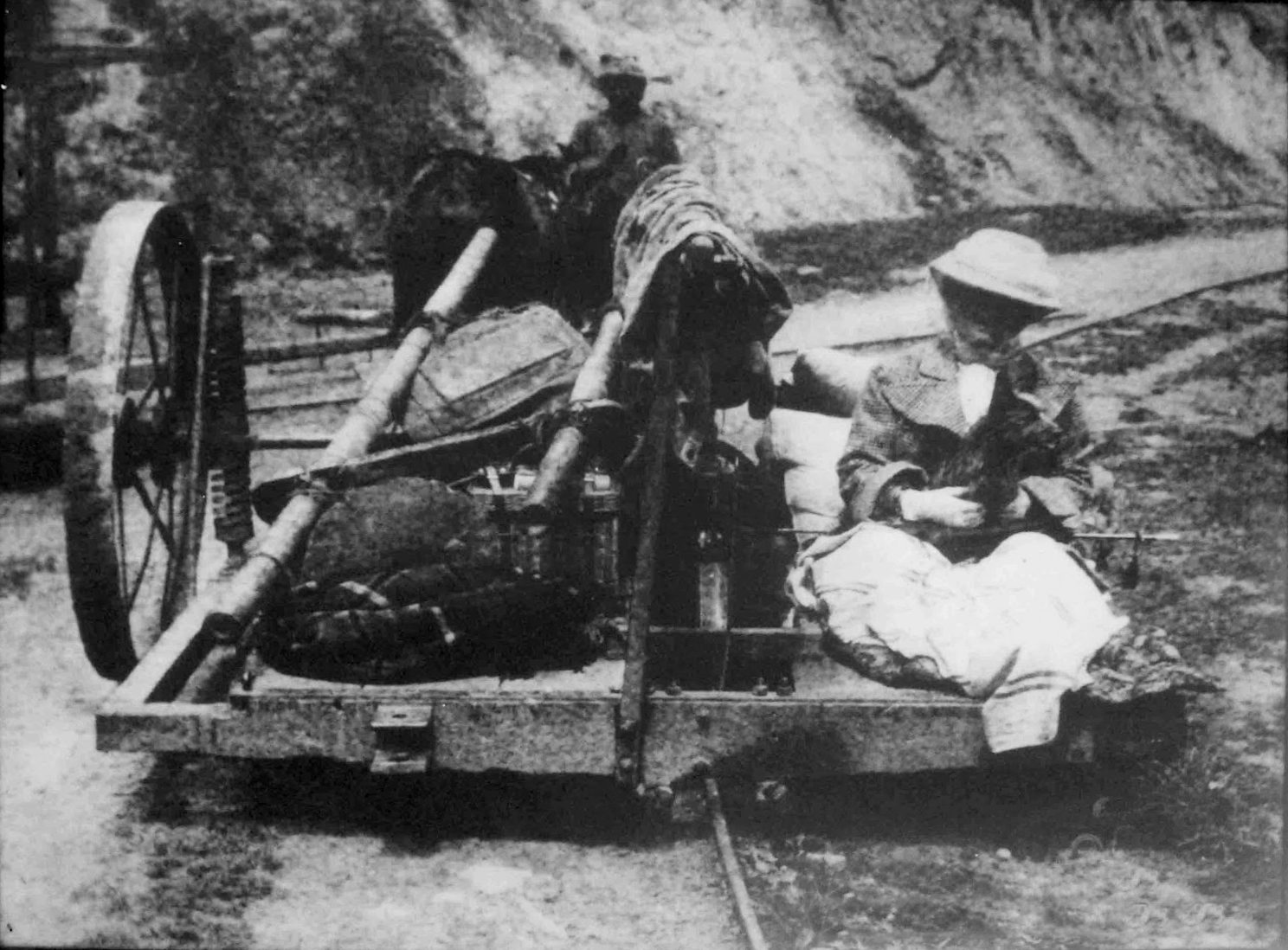
Mrs. A.W. John on the monorail

Kundala Valley Railway was built in 1902 and operated between Munnar and Top Station in the Kannan Devan Hills of Kerala . This railway was built to transport tea and other goods. Initially a cart road was cut in 1902, then later replaced by a monorail goods carriage system along the road leading from Munnar to Top Station for the purpose of transporting tea and other products from Munnar and Madupatty to Top Station. This monorail was based on the Ewing System and had a small wheel placed on the track while a larger wheel rested on the road to balance the monorail. This was similar to the Patiala State Monorail Trainways. The monorail was pulled by bullocks. Top Station was a transshipment point for delivery of tea from Munnar to Bodinayakkanur. Tea chests arriving at Top Station were then transported by an aerial ropeway from Top Station 5 km (3 mi) down hill to the south to Kottagudi, Tamil Nadu, which popularly became known as "Bottom Station". The tea was shipped 15 km (9 mi) by cart to Bodinayakkanur railway station located in the then Madras Presidency, then by rail to other places in India and by ship to England.

=== Narrow-gauge railway (1908–1924) ===
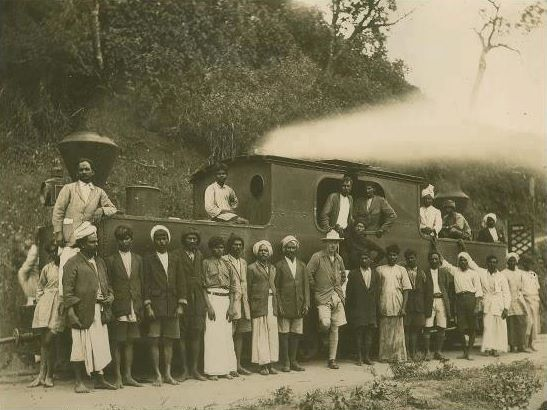
The engineer G. S. Gilles at Munnar Blairgowrie Halt

In 1908, the monorail was replaced by a 2 ft (610 mm) narrow-gauge light railway. Light steam locomotives were used to pull trains to stations at Madupatty and Palaar.

== Closure ==
The Great flood of 99 completely destroyed the Kundala Valley Railway in 1924, and the line was never rebuilt.

== Revival efforts ==
In 2019, planning of the Kundala Valley Rail by Kerala Tourism Department began following a study that was conducted by DTPC Idukki and Kannan Devan Hills Plantation.In Kerala State Budget 2021 T. M. Thomas Isaac included the revival of the rail project as a heritage rail.

== Remains ==
The Munnar railway station building now houses the regional office of Tata Tea. The railway tracks have been replaced by a road in front of this building. Aluminium Bridge near Munnar which was once a railway bridge on the line, has since been converted to road traffic.
