= Michael Graham Satow =

ICI engineer and Rail heritage activist ini India and the United Kingdom

Michael Graham Satow OBE
- Born: 15 June 1916
- Died: 13 November 1993 (aged 77)
- Occupation: Engineer
- Employer: Imperial Chemical Industries
- Known for: Railway preservation in India and the United Kingdom
- Awards: Order of the British Empire

Michael Graham Satow OBE, or simply Mike Satow was an engineer and key figure in railway heritage in India and the United Kingdom. He was pivotal in the establishment of the National Rail Museum, New Delhi, India and creation of a replica of Locomotion No. 1.

== Life ==
Satow was born on 15 June 1916. Educated at Stowe School, he suffered a hip injury playing rugby and spent nine months in a hospital where he learned shorthand and typing. Falling behind in his education, he took a position with a heavy equipment company.

Satow became an engineer and general manager for Imperial Chemical Industries (ICI), and was a member of the team who built the Wilton Nylon plant on Teesside in 1947. His father also worked in engineering.

Satow was assigned by ICI to India in 1956, his family joining him there later. Satow said "The first railway that I can ever recall turning me on was the Matheran Railway". He developed a passion for steam locomotives constructed in the United Kingdom and exported to India.

In 1963 he organised for Baguley locomotive works No. 2007 to be recovered from a water pumping station at Barrackpore, India and restored at an ICI subsidiary. He was later to recover that locomotive in 1971 as well as Baldwin Class 10-12-D No. 778 to the Leighton Buzzard Light Railway heritage operation where he was the first president.

He was appointed an honorary adviser to the National Rail Museum, New Delhi in 1970.

Satow was awarded an Order of the British Empire In the 1971 Birthday Honours For services to British interests in India.

In 1975 Satow featured in The World About Us television series in the episode The Romance of Indian Railways.

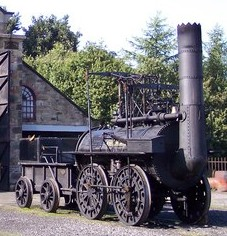
Locomotion No. 1 replica, one engine Satow helped to build

Satow retired in England and was later involved in the construction of a replica of George Stephenson's 1825 steam engineer Locomotion No. 1 which was exhibited at the Beamish Museum.

Satow died on 13 November 1993 aged 77.

=== Legacy ===
In addition to his contributions to preservation Satow amassed a collection of notebooks and papers relating to Indian Railways, the information is catalogued by The National Archives of the United Kingdom.

== Bibliography ==
- Satow, F.; Satow, M.G.; Wilson, L.S. (1976). Locomotion – concept to creation: the story of the reproduction 1973–1975. Beamish: Locomotion Trust.
- Satow, M.; Desmond, Ray (1980). Railways of the Raj. London: Scholar Press. ISBN 0859676587. OCLC 877295643.
