= Charles T. Pepper =

American physician and surgeon (1830–1903)

Doctor Charles T. Pepper
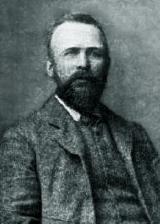
- Pepper in 1901
- Born: Charles Taylor Pepper; December 2, 1830; Big Spring, Virginia, US
- Died: May 29, 1903 (aged 72); Rural Retreat, Virginia, US
- Occupation: Physician
- Known for: Potential namesake of the Dr Pepper drink

Charles Taylor Pepper (December 2, 1830 – May 28, 1903) was an American physician and surgeon, who is often cited as the namesake for the soft drink brand Dr Pepper. Many stories on the origins of the drink's name exist, of which the Dr Pepper Museum has been unable to confirm or authenticate which one may be the true historical record.

Pepper was a Confederate surgeon during the American Civil War where he practiced at a college in Virginia. After the war he opened a drug store in Rural Retreat where he sold medical supplies and worked in the medical field providing services for the surrounding area. He stayed in Virginia his entire life.

== Early life ==
Pepper was born in Big Spring, Virginia, on December 2, 1830. He was the twelfth child to John and Mary Pepper (née Robertson).

== Mid life ==
Pepper attended the University of Virginia for medical training and received his Doctor of Medicine degree in 1855, beginning practice the following year. He was a Confederate surgeon during the American Civil War and practiced at Emory and Henry College. From 1862 to 1865 the college was commandeered by the Confederate States of America and used as a hospital.

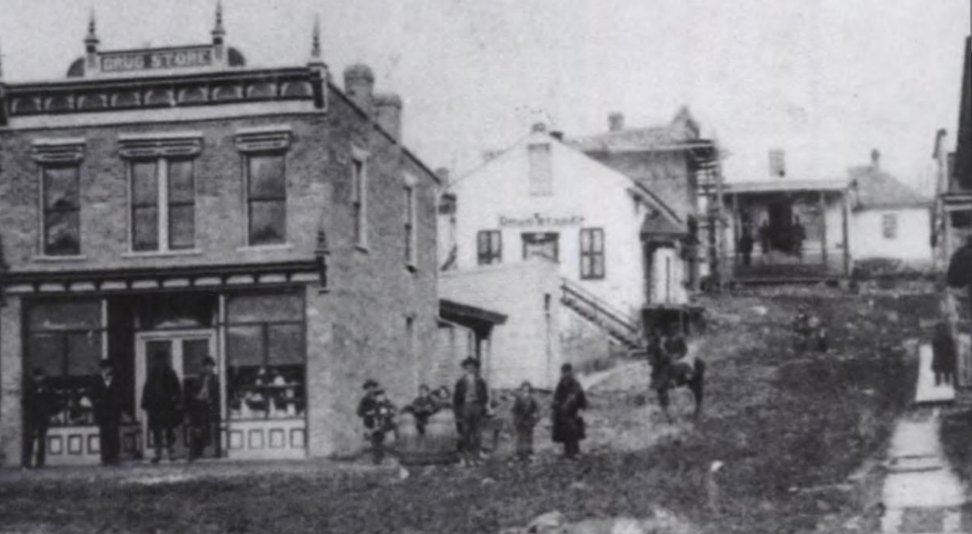
Dr Pepper store in Rural Retreat, c. 1890

Pepper married Isabella Howe (1838–1903) of Rural Retreat on May 18, 1858, in Pulaski County, Virginia. She was cousin to James Hoge Tyler, future Governor of Virginia. They had five children who were all born in Rural Retreat, four of which grew to adulthood. Their children were William Howe (b. April 11, 1859); Charles Robertson (b. November 14, 1862); Mary Margaret (1865–1867); Lewis Ervin (b. February 14, 1872); and Ruth McDowell (b. August 20, 1874).

Pepper moved to Bristol, Tennessee after the war and practiced as a medical doctor. In 1879 he moved near Rural Retreat, Virginia, and built a home that he named Grassland. He purchased a commercial building in downtown Rural Retreat that he converted into a doctor's office and a drug store. There he practiced medicine for decades and sold medical supplies all throughout Wythe County, Virginia. Pepper continued as a practicing physician until 1896. The drug store building he owned was later purchased by others and ultimately went out of business in 1994.

== Later life ==
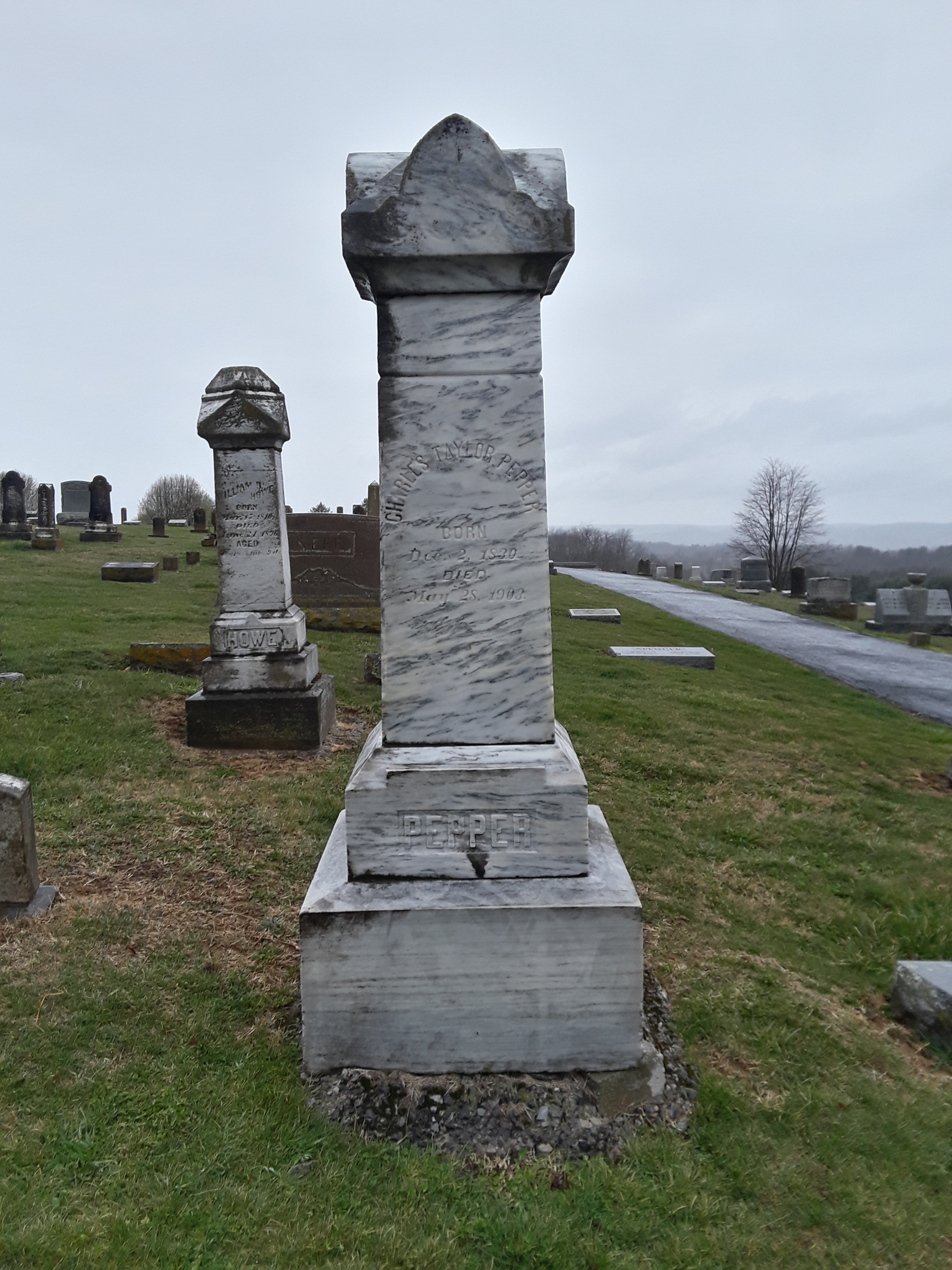
Grave of Dr. Pepper in Mountain View Cemetery, Rural Retreat, Virginia

Pepper and his wife were heavily involved in civic affairs and the Presbyterian Church at Rural Retreat. From time to time he provided needed free medical attention to the poor. Pepper's son, Louis, was the editor of the Evening Bee of Danville in 1903 when he received a telegram that his father died at his home in Rural Retreat. Pepper died after a lingering illness on May 29 and his wife (Louis' mother) died two months earlier on March 9.

== Dr. Pepper drink origin ==
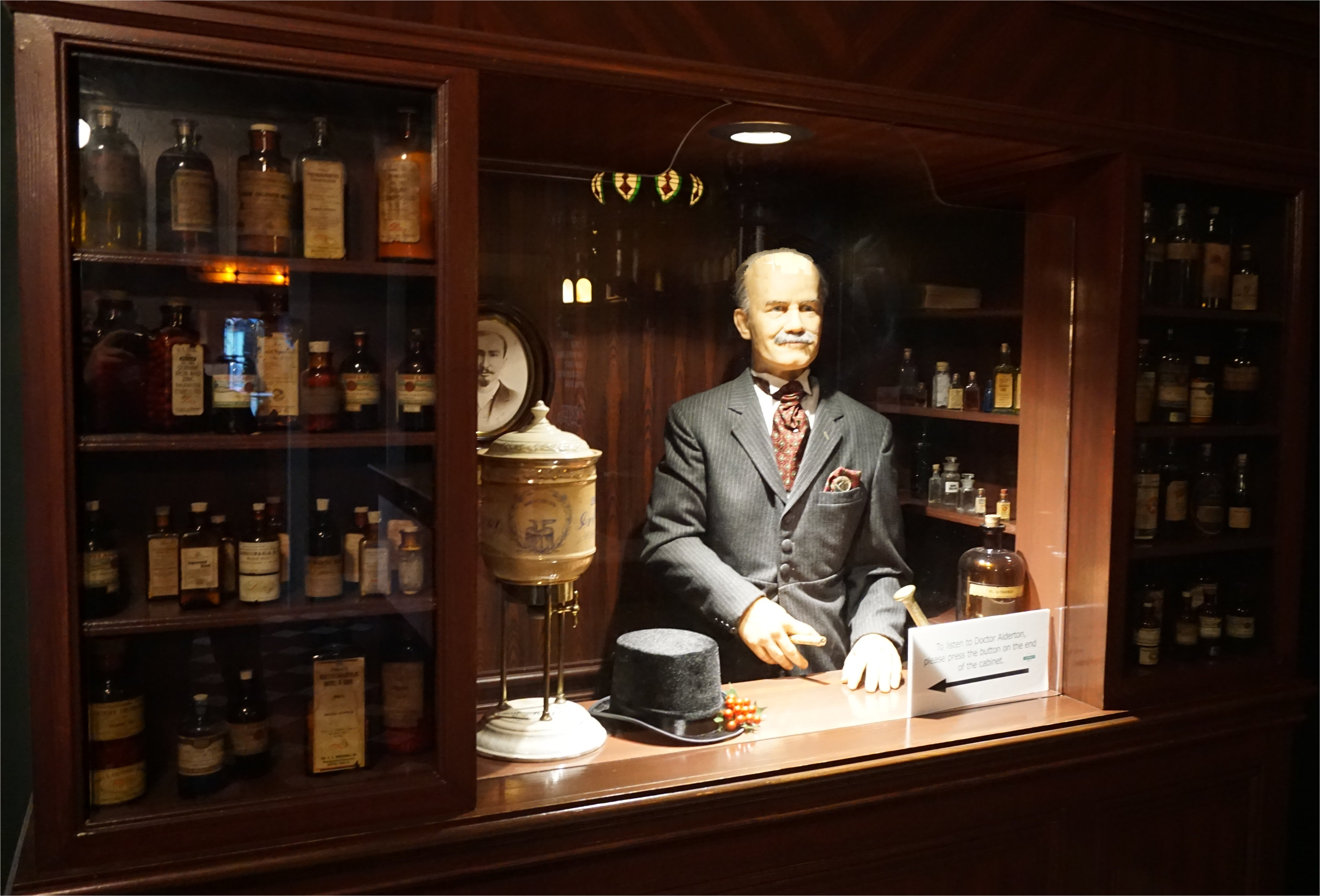
Morrison Old Corner Drug Store replica with pharmacist Charles C. Alderton

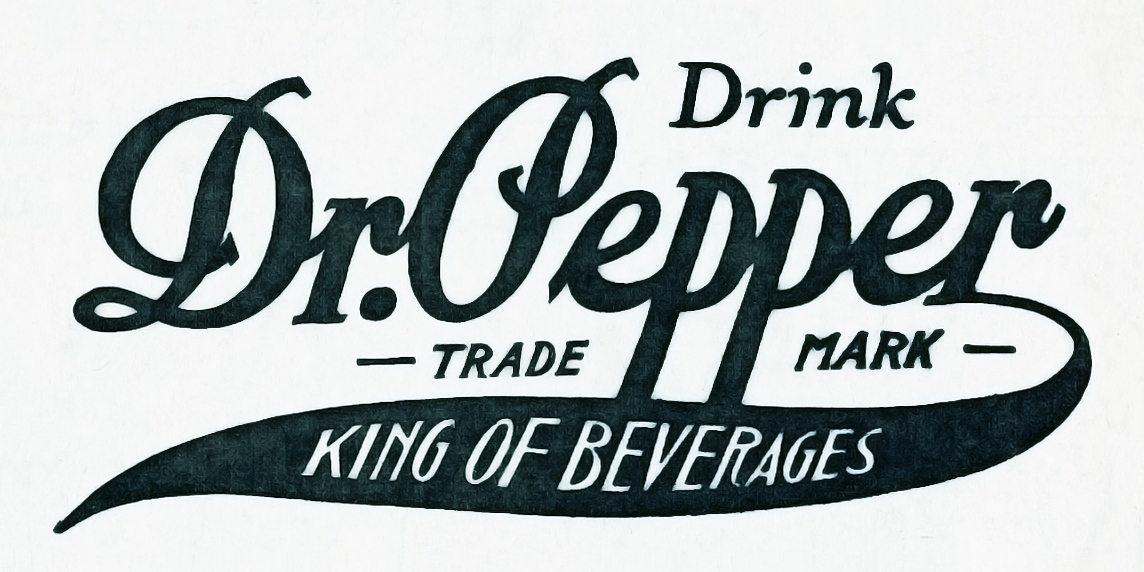
Dr Pepper logo (1910)

Pepper hired Wade Morrison in 1874, and Morrison worked for Pepper for a few years, leaving in 1880 to travel west. In Texas, Morrison obtained employment as a pharmacist in Austin and then later in Round Rock. Morrison moved around Texas, ending in Waco. In 1882 he bought John W. Castles's drug store in downtown Waco. In 1885, Morrison employed pharmacist Charles Alderton. Alderton, of New York State, went to school in England, gaining knowledge of carbonated beverages. Morrison and Alderton mixed carbonated water, fruit juices, and sugar to produce a soft drink that had an unusual taste. It was eventually called "a Waco" – the customers at the drug store would order this drink saying, shoot a Waco. There are nearly a thousand people in Rural Retreat that claim the formula for the drink was stolen by Morrison. Pepper, known for formulating carbonated fountain drinks out of herbs, wrote a note in one of his store's ledgers that he contrived 'swamp root' – a drink of quinine, spices, raisins and soda.

Morrison's popular Waco drink begat the need for an official name. During the later part of the nineteenth century it was common practice to name a product with the prefix Dr. to make it sound healthful; E.g., Dr. Davis's Liver Pills, Dr. Chandler's Hemlock Plaster, and Dr. Able's Compound Honey of Tar and Lemon. Carbonated drinks were considered healthful, so the Waco drink was given a name that sounded medicinal. Morrison labeled the drink Dr. Pepper, taking the name from his previous employer in Virginia. The assertion that Morrison was employed by Pepper, and named the drink after him, is disputed. Milly Walker, collections manager / curator for the Dublin (Texas) Dr Pepper Bottling Company Museum, said that there is no proof that Morrison ever worked as an assistant for Dr. Charles T. Pepper in the town of Rural Retreat.

The Dr Pepper Museum in Waco has received over a dozen versions of the story attributing the name of the drink to the medical doctor of Virginia. One is that Dr. Pepper concocted a black cherry tasting beverage that was a mixture of herbs and roots blended with seltzer. It became popular after Robert Lazenby, a Waco chemist, duplicated the drink and called it Dr. Pepper's Phos-Ferrates. The drink became popular in the southwestern states after being introduced in the 1904 St. Louis World's Fair. One account involves a boy-pines-for-girl version involving Dr. Pepper's daughter Ruth. It remains uncertain, however, which, if any, of these tales is the true origin of the name.

== Sources ==
- Hall, Karen Lynn Jones (25 August 2004). Wythe County. Charleston, South Carolina: Arcadia Publishing. ISBN 978-1-4396-2958-1.
- Hallett, Anthony; Hallett, Diane (24 October 1997). Entrepreneur magazine: encyclopedia of entrepreneurs. New York, New York: Wiley. ISBN 978-0-471-17536-0.
- Hogan, David G. (1999). Selling'em by the Sack. New York, New York: New York University Press. ISBN 978-08147-3567-1.
- Johnston, David Emmons (1906). Middle New River Settlements... Standard Ptg. & Publishing Company. OCLC 934447518.
- Rodengen, Jeffrey L. (1995). Legend of Dr Pepper/Seven-Up. Fort Lauderdale, Florida: Write Stuff Syndicate. ISBN 978-0-945903-49-9. "No matter what story is true, Charles Taylor Pepper has the unusual distinction of being immortalized by a soft drink."
- Smith, Andrew F. (2012). Fast Food & Junk Food. Santa Barbara, California: ABC-CLIO. ISBN 978-03133-9393-8.
- Smith, Andrew F. (2013). Food & Drink in American History. Santa Barbara, California: ABC-CLIO. ISBN 978-16106-9233-5.
