= Oakwood Cemetery (Waco, Texas) =

Cemetery in Waco, Texas

Coordinates: 31.538°N 97.112°W

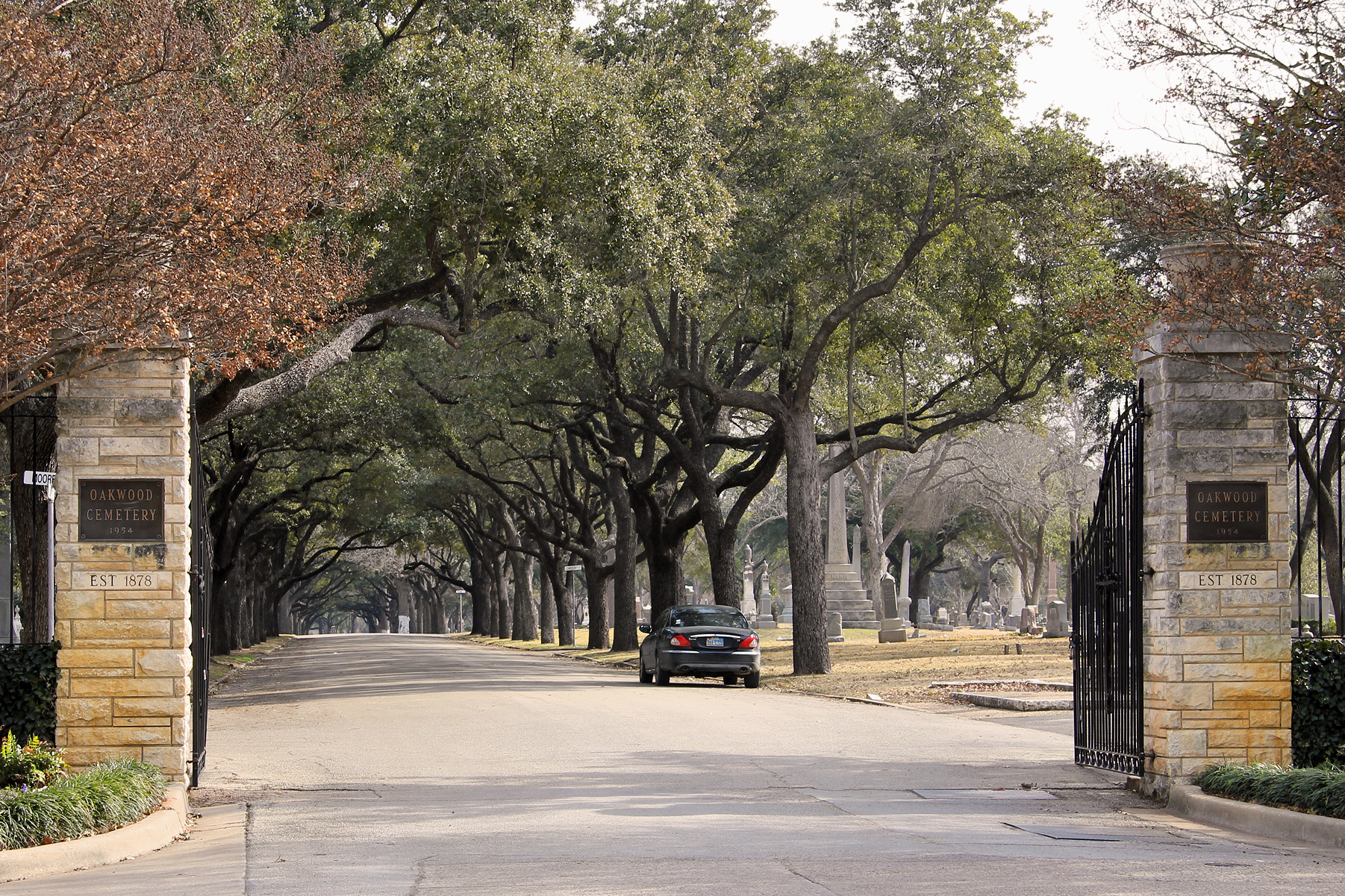
- The main entrance to Oakwood Cemetery
- Interactive map of Oakwood Cemetery

Details
- Established: 1878
- Location: Waco, Texas
- Size: 157-acre (64 ha)

Oakwood Cemetery is a 157-acre (64 ha) cemetery in Waco, Texas, in which three governors of Texas are buried.

== History ==
Founded in 1878, to relieve crowded conditions at Waco's main First Street Cemetery, it was built on the site of an abandoned horseracing track.

Many interred remains from other early local graveyards were moved here because of the better maintenance of these grounds. Since 1898, the Oakwood Cemetery Association, a private group, has operated this tract, although the land remains the property of the city. The board of directors of the association consists of women only, as provided in the original by-laws.

The cemetery is characterized by tree-lined streets, large monuments, and angels.

== Notable burials ==
- Charles Alderton (1857–1941), pharmacist and inventor of Dr. Pepper, is interred at section B-1, lot 425.
- William Cowper Brann (1855–1898), a crusading journalist and playwright, editor of the Iconoclast
- Rufus Columbus Burleson (1823–1901) was president of Baylor University twice, 1851–1861 and 1886–1897.
- Richard Coke (1829–1897), twice elected governor of Texas and once as U.S. senator, Coke is buried near his "friend through eternity", David Richard Wallace. Their life-sized statues face each other near lot 66, block 1.
- Hallie Earle (1880–1963), First licensed female physician in Waco, only female graduate of 1907 Baylor University Medical School in Dallas.
- Frank Shelby Groner (1877–1943), President of College of Marshall.
- Thomas Harrison (1823–1891), Confederate States Army general.
- Neil McLennan (c. 1777–1867), namesake of McLennan County, Texas, and pioneer of Scottish birth
- Patrick Morris Neff (1871–1952), governor of Texas and president of Baylor University, is interred at lot 149, section F.
- Felix Huston Robertson (1839–1928), Confederate brigadier general
- Jerome B. Robertson (1815–1890), Confederate colonel and brevet brigadier general
- Lawrence Sullivan Ross (1838–1898), the namesake of Sul Ross State University, U.S. senator, governor of Texas, president of Texas A&M University, Texas Ranger who recaptured Cynthia Ann Parker, and Confederate brigadier general, is interred at lot 5, block 1.
- Edgar E. Witt (1876–1965), lieutenant governor of Texas 1931–1935, chairman of the American-Mexican Claims Commission, chief commissioner of the Indian Claims Commission
- James E. Yantis (1856–1918), justice of the Texas Supreme Court
