= Kimberling Lutheran Cemetery =

Historic site in Wythe County, Virginia, US

- U.S. National Register of Historic Places
- U.S. Historic district
- Virginia Landmarks Register
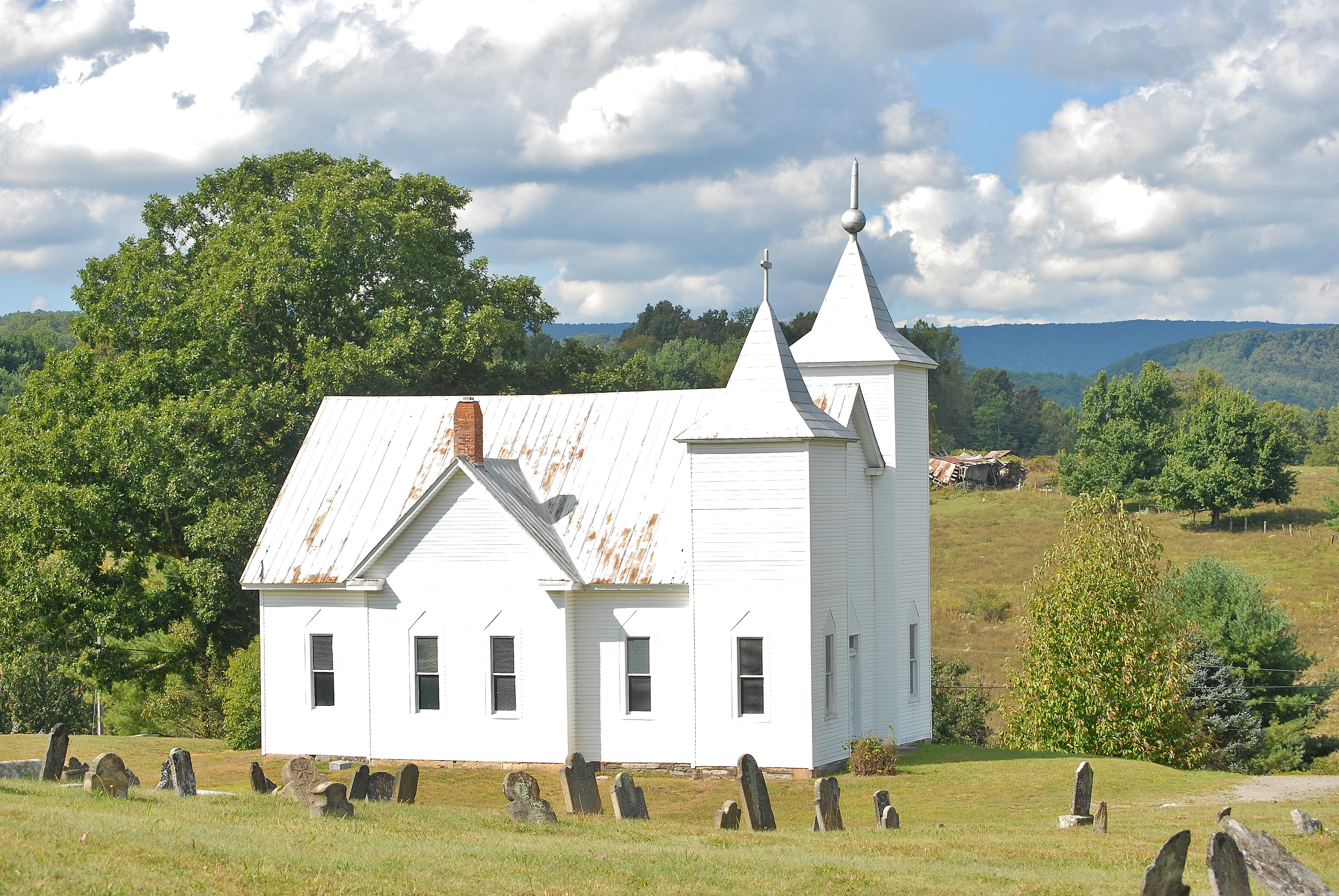

- Location within Virginia Location within the United States
- Location: NW of Rural Retreat, near Rural Retreat, Virginia
- Coordinates: 36°55′03″N 81°18′15″W
- Area: 3 acres (1.2 ha)
- Built: 1800
- NRHP reference No.: 80004231
- VLR No.: 098-0049

Significant dates
- Added to NRHP: March 26, 1980
- Designated VLR: December 20, 1977

Kimberling Lutheran Cemetery is a historic Lutheran cemetery and national historic district located near Rural Retreat, Wythe County, Virginia. The cemetery includes approximately about 50 early Germanic sandstone monuments dating from 1800 to 1850. The associated Kimberlin Lutheran Church was built in 1913, and is a large frame structure with two unequal-sized towers.

It was listed on the National Register of Historic Places in 1980.
