= Hallie Earle =

American physician

- Born: Harriet Earle; September 27, 1880; McLennan County, Texas, US
- Died: November 1, 1963 (aged 83); McLennan County, Texas, US
- Education: Baylor University Medical School in Dallas
- Known for: First licensed female physician in Waco
- Medical career
- Profession: Physician
- Institutions: Private practice
- Sub-specialties: Gynecology

Hallie Earle (1880–1963) was the first licensed female physician in Waco, Texas. In 1907, she was the only female graduate of the Baylor University Medical School in Dallas. Her private medical practice served the community of Waco for over three decades. Upon her father's death, Earle was appointed to assume his civic duty as a weather observer. In 1960, the United States Weather Bureau recognized Earle for her four decades as the Central Texas weather observer.

== Early life ==
Harriet "Hallie" Earle was born in a log house in McLennan County, Texas on a farm near Hewitt on September 27, 1880. She was the youngest of eight children born to Civil War veteran Major Isham Harrison Earle of the 10th Texas Infantry Regiment, and his wife Adaline Graves Earle. Hallie came from a long line of physicians that included both grandfathers and several great uncles. Her grandfather B.W. Earle was an early physician in Waco and built the Recorded Texas Historic Landmark designated Earle-Harrison House.

== Education ==
When she enrolled at Baylor University, Earle was a voracious student who earned accolades both from her professors, and from the university president Oscar H. Cooper. The Baylor president praised her math skills as exceeding all other students, and predicted she would be a good teacher. She was honored by Baylor University when her 1902 M.S. degree thesis was included in the cornerstone of the school's newly erected Carroll Science Building.

After graduation Earle taught school in Gainesville in Cooke County. Earle entered the Baylor University Medical School in Dallas and spent $30 a month for room, board, and living expenses during her enrollment there. While at medical school, her letters home indicated a student focused on success. She established a record of the highest grade point average posted to that date. Earle received her M.D. in 1907, the only graduating female in her class. She did her post graduate work in Chicago and New Orleans. Earle's internship was at historic Bellevue Hospital in New York.

== Practice ==
The McLennan County adjacent community of Marlin in Falls County had been known for its healing mineral waters since 1892. During the next half century, health-related industries flourished in Marlin. Earle practiced at Marlin's Torbett Hospital for seven years, while continuing her post-graduate studies and advertising her availability in medical publications.

Earle opened her Waco office in 1915, and built a private practice around women. Earle was the first licensed female physician in Waco. She was joined by her cousin, lab technician Lucille Pearre. Earle also assisted with medical examinations of female students enrolled in Baylor's physical education program. Her paying patients in her private practice were interspersed with indigent patients. In 1948, Earle retired from medicine.

== Weather observer ==
She followed in her father's meteorological footsteps and was appointed the lone Central Texas weather observer in 1916. The United States Weather Bureau recognized her achievements with the John Campanius Holm Award in 1960.

== Personal life and death ==
Hallie Earle never married, preferring to live with her sister Mary and cousin Lucille. After opening her private practice in Waco, Earle lived the rest of her life at home on the family farm. She died November 1, 1963, and is buried at Oakwood Cemetery in Waco. In 1996, the Texas Historical Commission placed a marker on her grave acknowledging her achievements.
