= Rural Retreat station =

- Rural Retreat Depot
- U.S. National Register of Historic Places
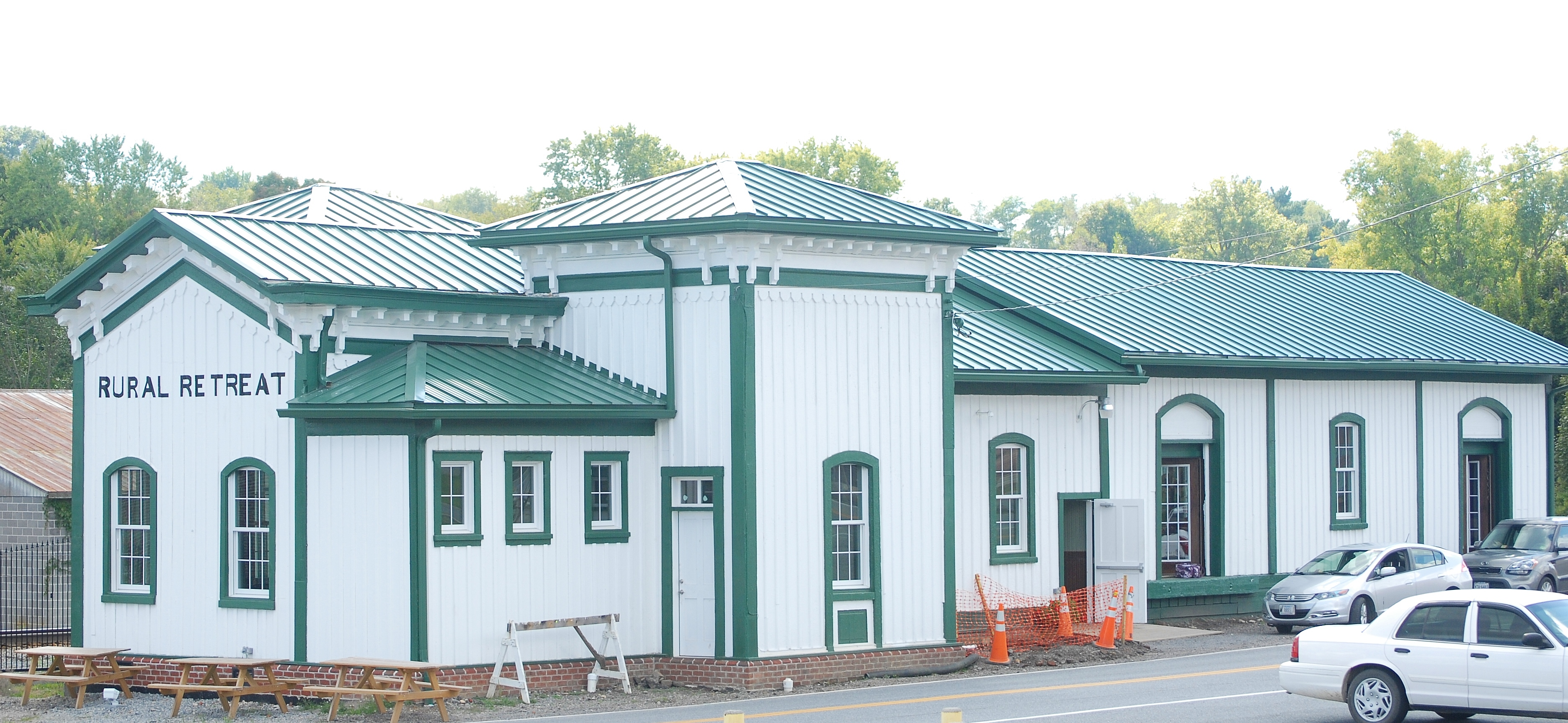

- Location within Virginia Location within the United States
- Location: 105 Railroad Ave. Rural Retreat, Virginia
- Coordinates: 36°53′38″N 81°16′35″W
- Area: less than one acre
- Built: 1870
- NRHP reference No.: 14000531
- Added to NRHP: August 25, 2014

The Rural Retreat Depot is a historic railroad station at 105 Railroad Avenue in Rural Retreat, Virginia. Built c. 1870, it is one of the oldest railroad stations in Southwest Virginia, and one of only two to survive from the Reconstruction Era. Its distinctive Italianate features include a pair of square towers, and wide shallow eaves with paired brackets.

The depot features in a number of photographs and audio recordings by O. Winston Link.

The depot was listed on the National Register of Historic Places in 2014.

== See also ==
- National Register of Historic Places in Wythe County, Virginia

Preceding station	Norfolk and Western Railway	Following station
Groseclose toward Bristol	Bristol – Roanoke	Crockett toward Roanoke
