= Big Spring, Virginia =

Unincorporated community in Virginia, US

Coordinates: 38°43′30″N 78°25′24″W

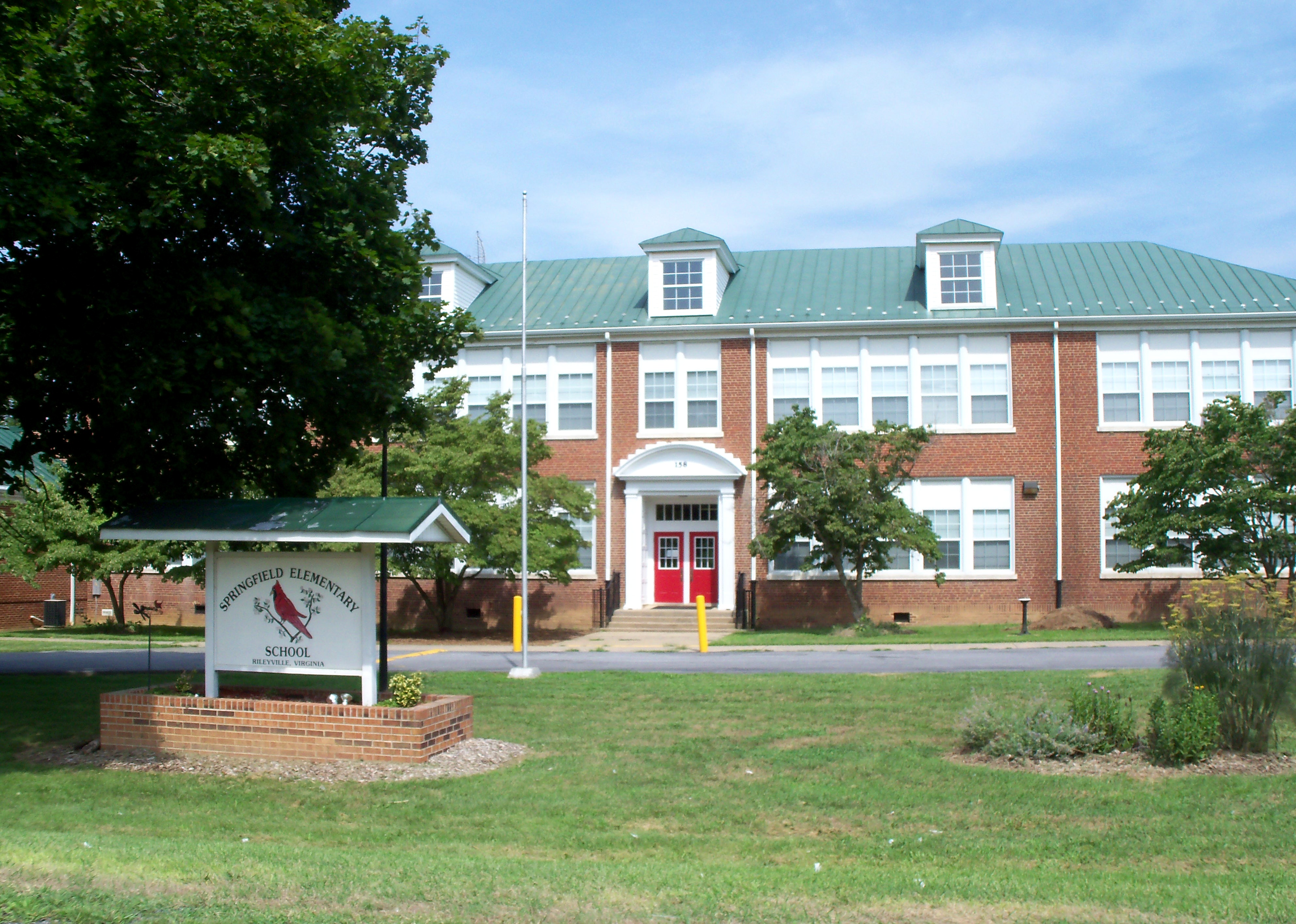
Springfield Elementary School is located in Big Spring.

Big Spring is an unincorporated community in Page County, in the U.S. state of Virginia. It is the birthplace of Dr. Charles Pepper.
