= Felix Huston Robertson =

Confederate general

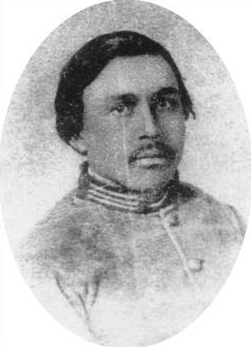
- Born: Felix Huston Robertson; March 9, 1839; Washington-on-the-Brazos, Republic of Texas
- Died: April 20, 1928 (aged 89); Waco, Texas, U.S.
- Burial place: Oakwood Cemetery; Waco, Texas, U.S.
- Military career
- Allegiance: United States; Confederate States
- Service years: 1860–1861 (USA); 1861–1865 (CSA)
- Rank: General (CSA)
- Conflicts: American Civil War

Felix Huston Robertson (March 9, 1839 – April 20, 1928) was a Confederate military officer who was known for being the only native-born Texan to serve as a general in the Confederate States Army during the American Civil War. He was noted for the controversial behavior of his troops at the Battle of Saltville, where an estimated 10–50 wounded Union soldiers of the 5th United States Colored Cavalry were killed on the battlefield and in the field hospital after the fighting.

== Early life ==
Robertson was born in Washington-on-the-Brazos, Texas, to Mary (Cummins) and Jerome B. Robertson, who would also serve as a Confederate general. He attended Baylor University and went to West Point in 1857, but left before graduation to serve the Confederacy.

== Civil War ==
Robertson was initially commissioned as a second lieutenant in the artillery of the Confederate Army, Robertson went to Charleston, South Carolina, and participated in the shelling of Fort Sumter. He then went to Florida, where he served as a staff officer for Brigadier General Adley H. Gladden at Pensacola.

In early 1862, Robertson became captain of an artillery battery from Alabama and fought at the Battle of Shiloh in April. He served at the Battle of Stones River at the end of the year. He was promoted by Braxton Bragg to the rank of major and given command of the reserve artillery battalion of the Army of Tennessee, which he led at Chickamauga in September 1863.

Robertson was subsequently promoted to lieutenant colonel and reassigned to command the Confederate horse artillery under Joseph Wheeler. He participated in the 1864 Atlanta campaign. Robertson's performance drew the attention of senior commanders, and on July 26, 1864, he was appointed brigadier general (temporary). He became Wheeler's chief of staff. He married Sarah Davis while on a furlough.

Perjurer, sycophant, quite probably a murderer, Felix Robertson of Texas was almost without doubt the most reprehensible man in either army to wear the uniform of a general. Only by the narrowest of margins did he escape being tried by his own government for what later generations would call war crimes.

— -- William C. Davis

Late in the year, Robertson was assigned a field command, leading first a brigade and later a division of cavalry. Robertson participated in a victory over Union troops at the First Battle of Saltville in Smyth County, Virginia on October 2. Many of the Federal troops participating were Black Americans, and over 100 were massacred by a group of guerillas associated with Robertson's troops on October 3. Robertson had bragged to another officer that "he had killed nearly all the Negroes." His conduct was such that when Robert E. Lee learned of it he communicated to General John C. Breckinridge his dismay "that a general officer should have been guilty of the crime you mention" and instructed Breckinridge to "prefer charges against him and bring him to trial." One of his subordinate officers, Champ Ferguson, was executed by hanging after the war for his part in what the Northern press deemed the "Saltville Massacre." Historian William C. Davis, in his book An Honorable Defeat. The Last Days of the Confederate Government (2001), said that Robertson personally "join(ed) in the act of villainy", although he escaped prosecution.

Robertson was severely wounded in the elbow during the Battle of Buck Head Creek near Augusta, Georgia, in late November 1864. He lived, but never resumed field duty.

On February 22, 1865, the Confederate Senate rejected Robertson's nomination to the grade of brigadier general. He was captured in Macon, Georgia on April 20, 1865. No record of his parole has been found.

== Postbellum career ==
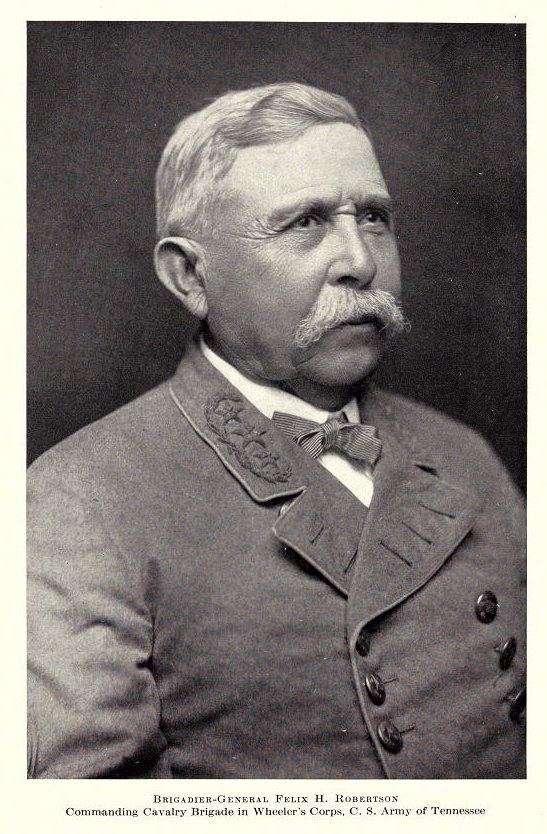
Robertson in later life

After the war, Robertson returned to Texas and settled in Waco. He studied law, passed his bar exam, and established a profitable legal practice. He and his father speculated in real estate and invested in several local railroads. After the death of his wife, Robertson remarried in 1892.

Robertson attempted to enter local politics in 1902 as he ran for mayor of Waco in the Democratic primaries. However, he was defeated by incumbent J. W. Riggins.

Robertson became the commander of the local United Confederate Veterans in 1911. In 1913, Texas Governor Oscar B. Colquitt appointed him as the Texas Representative for the Battle of Gettysburg Commission, a national group that commemorated the battle's fiftieth anniversary in July 1913 with several days of a Great Camp at the battlefield.

He died in Waco, Texas on April 20, 1928, and was buried in Oakwood Cemetery there.

== See also ==
- List of American Civil War generals (Acting Confederate)
