= W. W. Clements =

American soft drink industry businessman

Woodrow Wilson "Foots" Clements
- Born: July 30, 1914; Windham Springs, Alabama, U.S.
- Died: October 3, 2002 (aged 88)
- Education: University of Alabama
- Occupation: Business executive
- Years active: 1935–1995
- Employer: Dr Pepper
- Known for: CEO and chairman of Dr Pepper
- Title: CEO and Chairman of the Board (1974–1986)

Woodrow Wilson "Foots" Clements (July 30, 1914 – October 3, 2002) was an American businessman who helped to build the soft drink Dr. Pepper into a global brand. He served as the company's chief executive officer (CEO) and chairman of the board from 1974 to 1986.

== Biography ==
Clements was born on July 30, 1914, in Windham Springs, Alabama. He was named after then-President of the United States Woodrow Wilson. He became known as "Foots" in high school because of his unusually shaped toes. Clements funded his college education by working various jobs, including digging ditches for the Works Progress Administration (WPA), sweeping dormitories, cutting meat in a supermarket, and operating a cafe named the Sugar Bowl.

In 1935, while attending the University of Alabama, he began working for Dr. Pepper, initially selling their product out of a delivery truck. In 1942, he became a zone sales manager for Dr. Pepper, and he began working at the company's headquarters in Texas in 1944. He was named Dr. Pepper's general sales manager in 1957, executive vice president and director in 1967, president and chief operating officer in 1969, and chairman of the board and CEO in 1974. He continued to chair the board until 1986, and served as a member of the board until 1995.

In 1986, he became chairman emeritus, which he described at the time as "a title of honor that still carries certain responsibilities and authority." He continued to serve as a director at Dr. Pepper until 1995.

He died on October 3, 2002, at the age of 88, after suffering from dementia. Funeral services were held on October 7, 2002, at Park Cities Baptist Church, officiated by Reverend Leroy Summers. Clements was entombed at Hillcrest Mausoleum.

== Family ==
- Wife: Virginia Clements
- Son: Wayne W. Clements Sr., married to Susan, of Springfield, Missouri
- Sister: Flora Mims of Northport, Alabama
- Grandchildren:
  - Cathy Allday, married to Robert, of Dallas, Texas
  - Wayne Clements Jr. of Dallas, Texas
  - Brett Clements of Dallas, Texas
  - Rob Clements of Springfield, Missouri
- Great-grandchildren:
  - Lauren Allday of Dallas, Texas
  - Caroline Allday of Dallas, Texas
