= Jerome B. Robertson =

Confederate States Army general

Jerome Bonaparte Robertson
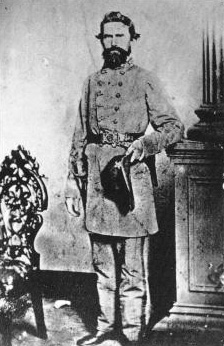
- Born: March 14, 1815; Woodford County, Kentucky
- Died: January 7, 1890 (aged 74); Waco, Texas
- Burial place: Oakwood Cemetery, Waco, Texas
- Military career
- Allegiance: Republic of Texas; Confederate States of America
- Branch: Army of the Republic of Texas; Confederate States Army
- Service years: 1836–1837 (Texas), 1861–1865 (CSA)
- Rank: Brigadier General (CSA)
- Nicknames: "Aunt Polly" "Bob"
- Commands: Texas Brigade
- Conflicts: American Civil War: Peninsula Campaign; Northern Virginia Campaign; Maryland Campaign; Battle of Fredericksburg; Gettysburg campaign; Battle of Chickamauga

Jerome Bonaparte Robertson (March 14, 1815 – January 7, 1890) was a doctor, soldier, and politician who served as a general in the Confederate States Army during the American Civil War. He was noted for his service in the famed Texas Brigade in the Army of Northern Virginia.

== Early life and career ==
Robertson was born in Woodford County, Kentucky, the son of Scottish immigrant Cornelius Robertson and his wife Clarissa Hill (Keech) Robertson. When Robertson was only four years old, his father died, leaving his mother almost penniless. Unable to properly support her family, she apprenticed young Robertson four years later to a hatter, who moved with the boy in 1824 to St. Louis. After studying medicine at Transylvania University in Kentucky, Robertson graduated in 1835. With the Texas Revolution emerging as a national topic, Robertson joined a company of Kentucky volunteers as a lieutenant and made plans to travel to Texas. However, they were delayed in New Orleans and did not arrive in the Republic of Texas until September 1836. There, he joined the Army of Texas and was commissioned as a captain.

In 1837, with Texas Revolutionary hostilities essentially ended, Robertson resigned his Texas commission and returned to Kentucky, where he married Mary Elizabeth Cummins. He returned with his wife and several relatives to Texas in December 1837, buying land and settling in Washington-on-the Brazos. He established a medical practice, and became known on the frontier as an Indian fighter through six years of sporadic campaigning. Furthermore, he also served in the military forces that helped repel two invasions by the Mexican army in 1842. After stints as the town's coroner, mayor, and postmaster, Robertson built a home in Independence in 1845. By this time, the Republic of Texas was on the verge of becoming the State of Texas. Robertson was elected in 1847 to the Texas House of Representatives and in 1849 to the Texas State Senate.

He and his wife Mary had three children, one of whom died in infancy. His son Felix Huston Robertson eventually became a brigadier general in the Confederate army.

== Civil War ==
Robertson was a delegate to the state Secession Convention in January 1861, and subsequently raised a company of volunteers for the Confederate army and was elected as its captain when it became a formal part of the newly raised 5th Texas Infantry Regiment in the brigade of John Bell Hood. In November 1861, Robertson was elevated to lieutenant colonel, and then on June 1, 1862, to colonel and command of the regiment. He was in the Peninsula Campaign, serving with distinction during the Seven Days Battles and leading his regiment in a successful charge during the Battle of Gaines' Mill that split the Union lines.

Robertson became popular with his soldiers due to his unusual concern for their welfare, giving rise to his nickname, "Aunt Polly." He served in the Northern Virginia Campaign and the Maryland Campaign, where his health was failing due to months of steady campaigning. During the Battle of South Mountain, he was overcome by exhaustion and had to be carried from the field. He did not rejoin his regiment until after the subsequent Battle of Antietam. However, by then his reputation as a fighter had been noted, and with the promotion of Hood to division command, Robertson was named as his successor and was promoted to brigadier general on November 1, 1862. He saw his first action as a brigade commander during the Battle of Fredericksburg.

=== Gettysburg and after ===
In the summer of 1863, Robertson led his brigade into Pennsylvania during the Gettysburg campaign. Hood's Division arrived too late for the first day's fighting during the Battle of Gettysburg, but they played a prominent role on the second day, where Robertson led his brigade in a series of hard-hitting, but ultimately unsuccessful, attacks on Little Round Top. Those attacks culminated with the fight for Devil's Den, during which his 1st, 4th, and 5th Texas regiments, as well as his 3rd Arkansas Infantry, took heavy casualties that ultimately resulted in their taking their objective, despite being greatly outnumbered by Union forces. Robertson was wounded along with several of his officers during that action, which he later described as "one of the hottest contests I have ever witnessed."

In September, along with the rest of Lt. Gen. James Longstreet's corps, Robertson and the Texas Brigade were moved to Tennessee to reinforce the Army of Tennessee, fighting with distinction at Chickamauga. However, Robertson's performance in the subsequent East Tennessee campaign invoked the wrath of both Longstreet and division commander Micah Jenkins. Longstreet filed formal court-martial charges against General Robertson, alleging dereliction of duty and accusing him of pessimistic remarks. Shortly before, Robertson had joined the other brigadiers in the division in support of Evander M. Law over Longstreet's protégé Jenkins as division commander, which undoubtedly influenced Longstreet, who was in a bitter argument with Law. Robertson was reprimanded, replaced as commander of the Texas Brigade, and transferred to Texas, where he commanded the state reserve forces until the end of the war.

== Postbellum career ==
Following the collapse of the Confederacy and the surrender of the remaining Texas forces, Robertson returned to his home in Independence and resumed his medical practice, a period marked by mourning when his wife died in 1868. He re-entered politics in 1874, being named as superintendent of the Texas Bureau of Immigration for two years. Two years later, he served as passenger and emigration agent for the Houston and Texas Central Railroad. Robertson married a widow, Mrs. Hattie Hendley Hook, in 1878 and relocated to Waco a year later. There, he continued to promote railroad construction in west Texas.

He held several high Masonic offices, including deputy grand master of the Third Masonic District and of the Twenty-ninth Masonic District. He was an organizer of the Hood's Texas Brigade Association, which he served as president many times.

He was initially buried at Independence next to his first wife and his mother. In 1894 his son had all three bodies moved to Oakwood Cemetery (Waco, Texas).

== See also ==
- List of American Civil War generals (Confederate)

Texas Senate
Preceded by John Winfield Scott Dancy	Texas State Senator from District 14; 1849–1851	Succeeded by James H. Armstrong
