= Doris Crouse-Mays =

American labor leader

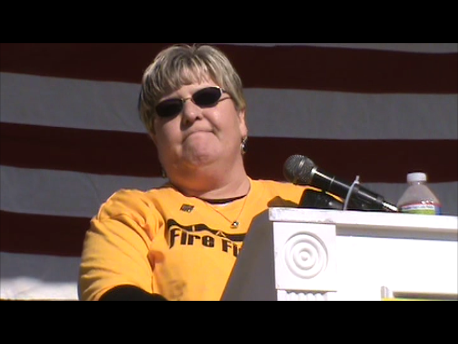
- Crouse-Mays at Williamsburg Rally
- Born: 1958 (age 67–68); Rural Retreat, Virginia
- Known for: American labor leader

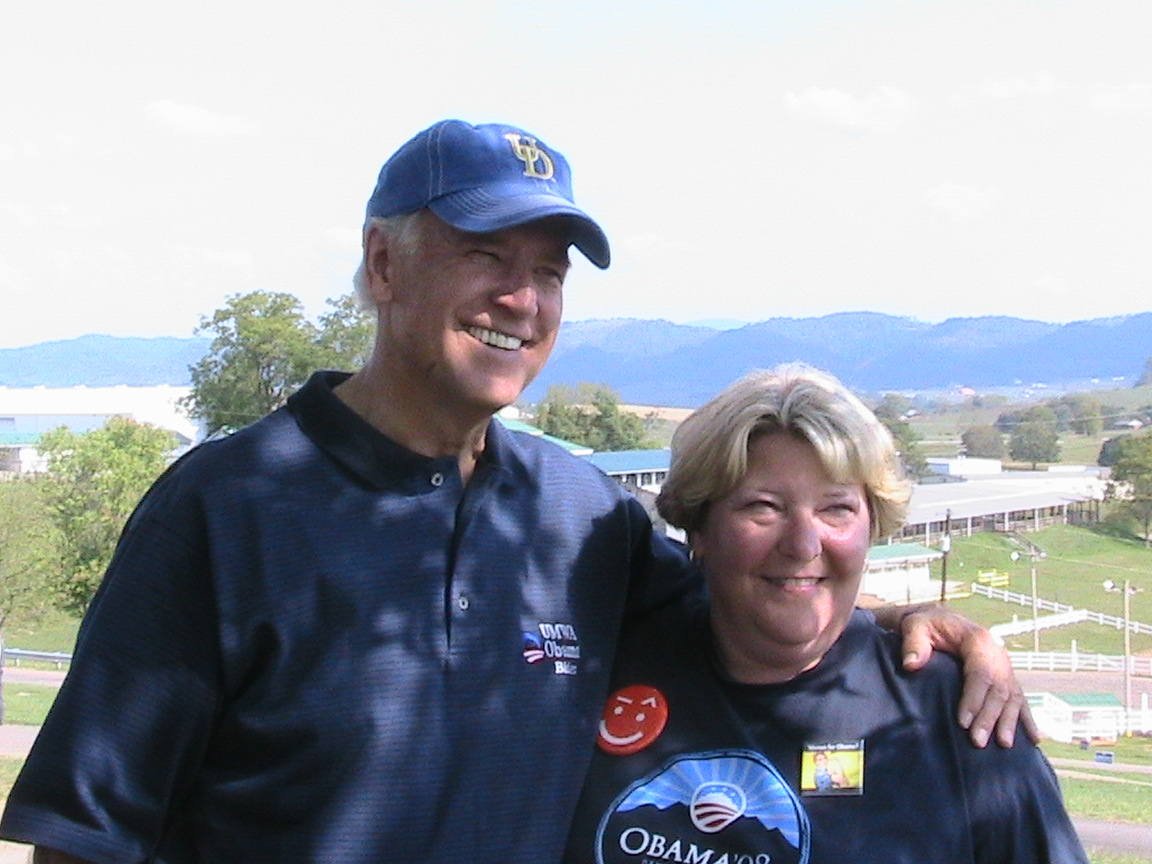
Crouse-Mays with Joe Biden in 2008

Doris Crouse-Mays (born 1958) is an American labor leader.

A native of Rural Retreat, Virginia, Crouse-Mays began her career as a telephone operator; as a shop steward she soon because involved in the organized labor movement. She first joined the Communications Workers of America, and later did organizational work for the International Ladies' Garment Workers' Union. Thanks to her abilities in the role, she became the state field director for the national AFL–CIO in 1997, in which position she attracted new members and expanded the group's political reach. In 2001 she served as the group's statewide coordinator for political programs; two years later she became its political director. She is a member of the Steering and Central Committee of the Virginia Democratic Party, and she was elected to the Democratic National Committee in 2008; in 2013 she served on the transition committee for governor-elect Terry McAuliffe. She is a board member of Emerge Virginia, a group which looks for women to run for political office.

Crouse-May was the first woman to hold executive office in Virginia's AFL–CIO, being elected its secretary-treasurer for a four-year term beginning in 2006. In August 2010 she became the first woman to be elected its president; in 2014 she was reelected to another four-year term in the position. Crouse-Mays was named one of the Library of Virginia's Virginia Women in History for 2017.
