= Pamela Stafford =

American painter

- Born: 1946 (age 79–80); Rural Retreat, Virginia
- Education: National Academy of Design, Centre d'Etude Russes Saint-George (Center for Russian Icons) and the Ecole des Beaux Arts
- Known for: Painting: portraits and murals
- Notable work: New Hope, 9/11 Memorial mural
- Spouse: Elliott Kuritzky
- Awards: Austin Abbey Foundation Mural Award, Florida Arts Society (first prize)

Pamela Stafford (born 1946) is an American model, fashion designer and portrait artist. She is best known for her award winning work New Hope, the winner of a mural award by the Abbey Foundation.

== Personal life and education ==
Pamela Stafford was born in Rural Retreat, Virginia and attended high school in Central Florida, where she was president of the Future Homemakers of America (FHA). Her interest in painting and designing began in high school.

Stafford moved to Manhattan in the 1970s and has resided there for at least part of the year ever since. In 1982, she married Elliott Kuritzky (born February 8, 1954), a resident in Internal Medicine at Beth Israel Hospital. Kuritzky graduated magna cum laude from UCLA, where he was elected Phi Beta Kappa in the UCLA School of Medicine. He died of cancer at age 29 at Mt. Sinai Hospital on August 1, 1983, just a year after the couple's marriage. (Note: The Social Security Death Index shows that Kuritzky died on August 1, 1983. Reputedly, the New York Times obituary stated that he died on August 15, 1983.) Due to the mishandling of his body, using a casket too small for her husband's body, Stafford sued Riverside Chapel, a New York City funeral home, for $10 million.

She lives and works in Manhattan, where she paints portraits and gives private oil painting lessons.

== Career ==
=== Modeling ===
Stafford appeared in magazines and brochures as a model in the 1970s and 1980s. She was "Miss Dodge," a spokesmodel for Marion Motor Company in Ocala, Florida, in 1972. In 1976, she posed in advertisements for the Cancun, Ixtapa and Mexico City properties of the Mexican resort chain Aristos. In the Cancun brochure, she was part of a happy couple, enjoying the buffets, pools, golf courses and beaches. She appeared in brochures for Casablanca Villas on Water Isle in the U.S. Virgin Islands from 1986 to 1989.

=== Fashion design ===
Stafford's fashion design career took shape in the late 1970s. She reportedly charged clients in New York $250 for pants suits that were made of natural fabrics with unusual textures and colors. Stafford of New York was her label.

=== Art ===
Desiring to focus her attention on art, Stafford studied drawing, painting and sculpting at the Art Student's League and the National Academy of Design, where she received a three-year certificate. She has painted and studied in Maudon, France at the Centre d'Etude Russes Saint-George (Center for Russian Icons) and at the Ecole des Baux Arts in Paris. Stafford made the How to Paint the Portrait video in 1999.

Her most popular work, New Hope, was inspired by the events of 9/11, and has been received with rave reviews from art critics, who have said "there is a harmony of patriotism, religion and beauty done in a dignified, calm manner." In a work entitled The Last Temptation of Christ, she used an incarcerated man as her model, and depicts him looking skyward towards heaven. This piece was revered as "arguably the most beautiful painting currently hanging in Abingdon."

She won a mural awarded by the Austin Abbey Foundation and first prize at the Florida Arts Society. She has received honors from the National Academy of Design, Andre Wang Arts School, and Cork Gallery.

She has been commissioned to make portraits, restore paintings, and provide private art instruction.

== Charity ==
Realizing that she was in a position to give back to the community, Stafford took great interest in charitable organizations. She was a guest speaker for amfAR, The Foundation for AIDS Research at the Atrium Club and the New York Women's Forum, where she held a reception which raised money for the foundation.

Stafford was a Red Cross volunteer during the September 11, 2001 attacks on the World Trade Center, and received a Red Cross appreciation certificate for her efforts.
