= Rural Retreat, Virginia =

Town of Rural Retreat, Virginia
- Town
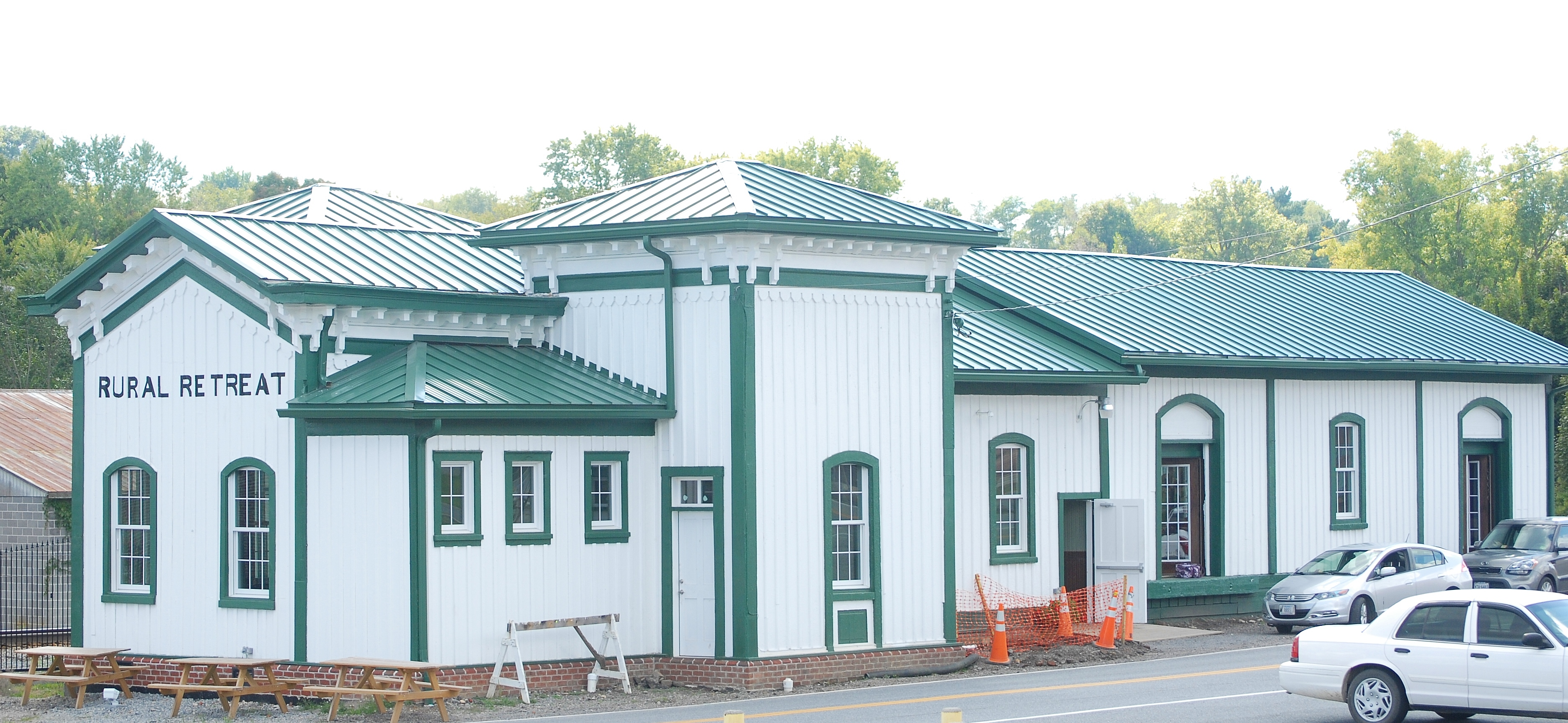
- Former railroad depot

- Seal

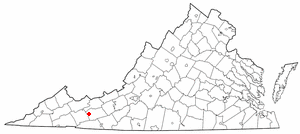
- Location in the Commonwealth of Virginia
- Coordinates: 36°53′36″N 81°16′34″W
- Country: United States
- State: Virginia
- County: Wythe

Government
  - Mayor: Timothy G. Litz

Area
  - Total: 2.28 sq mi (5.90 km^{2})
  - Land: 2.27 sq mi (5.89 km^{2})
  - Water: 0 sq mi (0.00 km^{2})
- Elevation: 2,513 ft (766 m)

Population (2020)
  - Total: 1,546
  - Estimate (2019): 1,448
  - Density: 636.3/sq mi (245.66/km^{2})
- U.S. Census Bureau, 2000 Population Estimates
- Time zone: UTC-5 (EST)
  - Summer (DST): UTC-4 (EDT)
- ZIP code: 24368
- Area code: 276
- FIPS code: 51-69456
- GNIS feature ID: 1486817
- Website: townofruralretreat.com

Rural Retreat is a town in Wythe County, Virginia, United States. As of the 2020 census, Rural Retreat had a population of 1,546.

== History ==
Rural Retreat was originally named Mount Airy. The name was changed because of confusion with other communities named Mount Airy. The community is located between Marion and Wytheville near the railroad line. During the 19th century, when the railroad was named Virginia and Tennessee Railroad, it had a Mount Airy depot.

The Kimberling Lutheran Cemetery was listed on the National Register of Historic Places in 1980; the Rural Retreat Depot was listed in 2014.

== Geography ==
According to the United States Census Bureau, the town has a total area of 2.2 square miles (5.8 km^{2}), all land.

== Demographics ==
Historical population
Census	Pop.	Note	%±
1880	286		—
1920	463		—
1930	436		−5.8%
1940	440		0.9%
1950	478		8.6%
1960	413		−13.6%
1970	872		111.1%
1980	1,083		24.2%
1990	972		−10.2%
2000	1,350		38.9%
2010	1,483		9.9%
2020	1,546		4.2%
U.S. Decennial Census

=== 2020 census ===
As of the 2020 census, Rural Retreat had a population of 1,546. The median age was 43.8 years. 21.2% of residents were under the age of 18 and 23.4% of residents were 65 years of age or older. For every 100 females there were 88.3 males, and for every 100 females age 18 and over there were 87.3 males age 18 and over.

0.0% of residents lived in urban areas, while 100.0% lived in rural areas.

There were 626 households in Rural Retreat, of which 30.5% had children under the age of 18 living in them. Of all households, 50.8% were married-couple households, 14.5% were households with a male householder and no spouse or partner present, and 28.4% were households with a female householder and no spouse or partner present. About 26.5% of all households were made up of individuals and 17.3% had someone living alone who was 65 years of age or older.

There were 700 housing units, of which 10.6% were vacant. The homeowner vacancy rate was 3.9% and the rental vacancy rate was 9.8%.

Racial composition as of the 2020 census
Race	Number	Percent
White	1,440	93.1%
Black or African American	7	0.5%
American Indian and Alaska Native	7	0.5%
Asian	0	0.0%
Native Hawaiian and Other Pacific Islander	1	0.1%
Some other race	21	1.4%
Two or more races	70	4.5%
Hispanic or Latino (of any race)	20	1.3%

=== 2000 census ===
As of the census of 2000, there were 1,350 people, 570 households, and 399 families living in the town. The population density was 600.6 people per square mile (231.7/km^{2}). There were 629 housing units at an average density of 279.8 per square mile (107.9/km^{2}). The racial makeup of the town was 98.52% White, 0.37% African American, 0.30% Native American, 0.15% Asian, 0.37% from other races, and 0.30% from two or more races. Hispanic or Latino of any race were 0.37% of the population.

There were 570 households, out of which 29.6% had children under the age of 18 living with them, 56.1% were married couples living together, 11.6% had a female householder with no husband present, and 30.0% were non-families. 25.4% of all households were made up of individuals, and 13.2% had someone living alone who was 65 years of age or older. The average household size was 2.37 and the average family size was 2.84.

In the town, the population was spread out, with 22.7% under the age of 18, 9.7% from 18 to 24, 27.7% from 25 to 44, 23.6% from 45 to 64, and 16.3% who were 65 years of age or older. The median age was 38 years. For every 100 females there were 88.8 males. For every 100 females aged 18 and over, there were 85.3 males.

The median income for a household in the town was $29,141, and the median income for a family was $41,776. Males had a median income of $27,198 versus $21,128 for females. The per capita income for the town was $15,993. About 7.7% of families and 11.2% of the population were below the poverty line, including 11.8% of those under age 18 and 13.7% of those age 65 or over.

== Notable people ==
- Doris Crouse-Mays, labor leader
- William N. Doak, third United States Secretary of Labor
- Dr. Charles T. Pepper, claimed as namesake of the drink "Dr Pepper"
- Deacon Phillippe, major league baseball pitcher
- Pamela Stafford, model, fashion designer and artist
