= Dr Pepper =

Carbonated soft drink

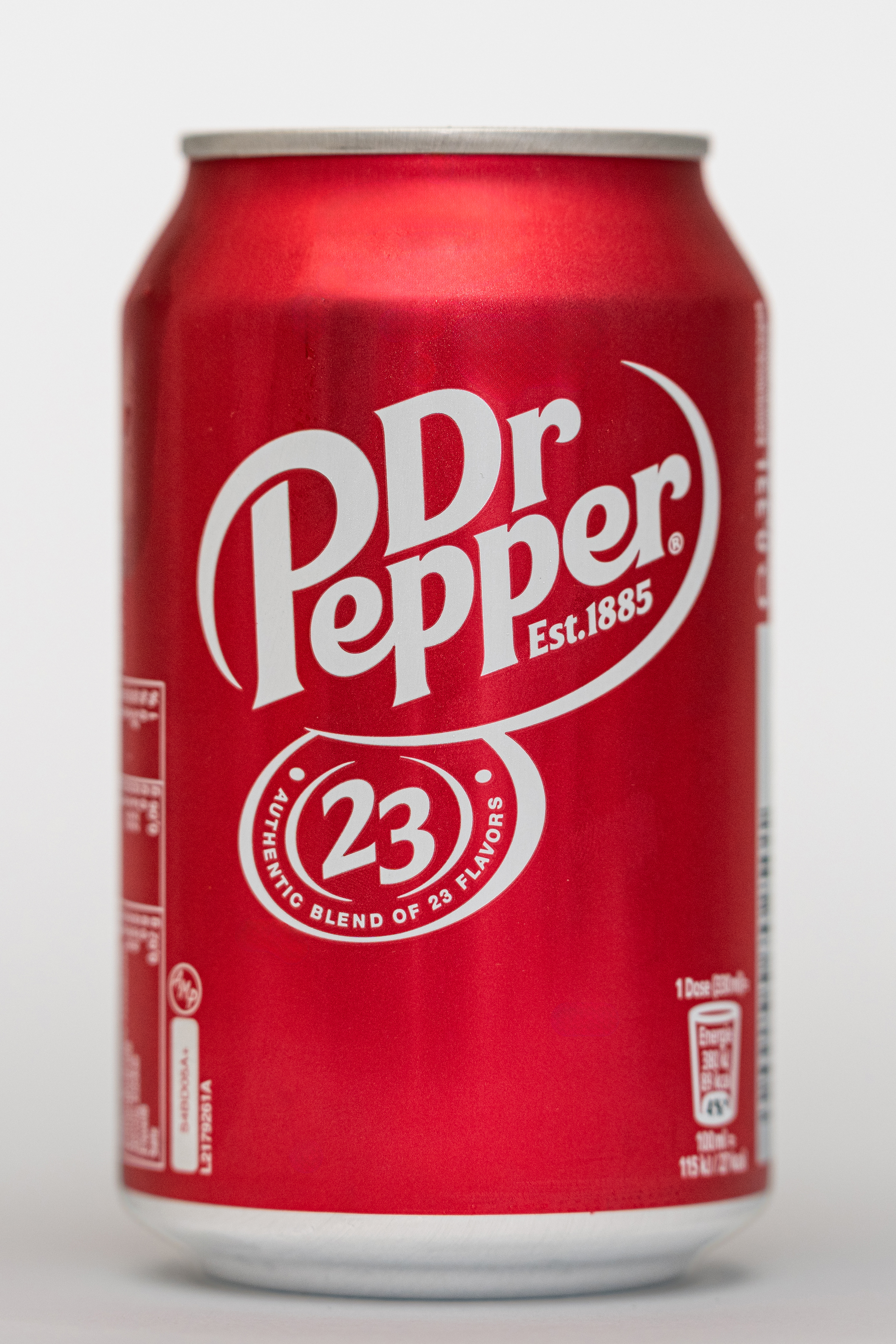
- A can of Dr Pepper as sold in Germany
- Type: Soft drink
- Distributor: Keurig Dr Pepper (North America); The Coca-Cola Company (United Kingdom, Ireland, South Korea and Japan); Suntory (Benelux, France, Italy, Poland, Portugal, Spain and Switzerland); Krombacher Brauerei (Germany); Sinebrychoff (Finland)
- Origin: Waco, Texas
- Introduced: 1885; 141 years ago
- Color: Caramel
- Flavor: Proprietary combination of 23 flavors
- Related products: Mr. Pibb; Dr. Wells
- Website: drpepper.com

Dr Pepper
Nutritional value per 12 fl oz (355 ml)
- Energy: 150 kcal (630 kJ)
- Carbohydrates: 40
- Sugars: 39
- Dietary fiber: 0
- Fat: 0
- Saturated: 0
- Trans: 0
- Protein: 0
Vitamins and minerals
| Vitamins | Quantity %DV^{†} |
| Vitamin A equiv. | 0% 0 μg |
| Vitamin C | 0% 0 mg |
| Minerals | Quantity %DV^{†} |
| Calcium | 0% 0 mg |
| Iron | 0% 0 mg |
| Potassium | 0% 0 mg |
| Sodium | 2% 55 mg |
- Other constituents: Quantity
- Cholesterol: 0
- Values for American version
- ^{†}Percentages estimated using US recommendations for adults, except for potassium, which is estimated based on expert recommendation from the National Academies.

Dr Pepper is a carbonated soft drink created in the 1880s by American pharmacist Charles Alderton in Waco, Texas. It was first marketed nationally in the United States in 1904. The beverage is manufactured and distributed by different companies depending on the country: Keurig Dr Pepper produces it in the United States, Canada, and Mexico; The Coca-Cola Company in the United Kingdom, Ireland, and Japan; and Suntory in most European territories. Variants include a diet version and, beginning in the 2000s, a range of additional flavors.

Although it shares some similarities with cola, in 1966, the U.S. Food and Drug Administration determined that Dr Pepper is not classified as a cola, root beer, or fruit-flavored soft drink. Instead, it is generally described as belonging to a distinct category often referred to as "pepper soda", named after the brand itself. Other beverages in this category, such as Dublin Original and Mr. Pibb, have a comparable flavor profile.

As of 2024, Dr Pepper is the second best-selling carbonated soft drink in the US.

== History ==
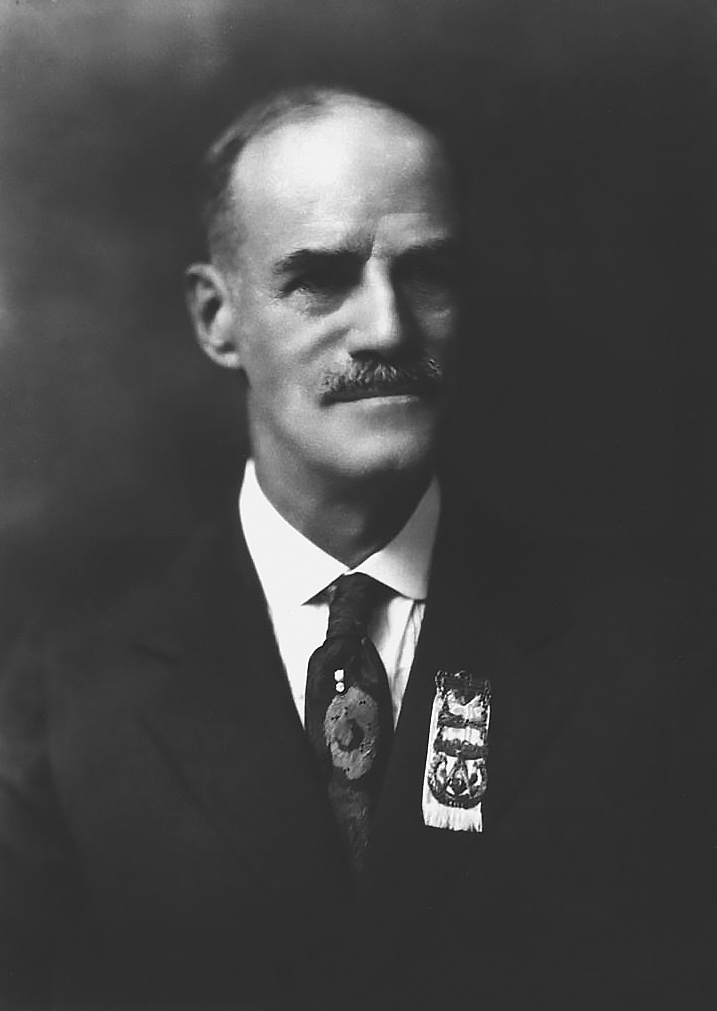
Charles C. Alderton, the originator of Dr Pepper

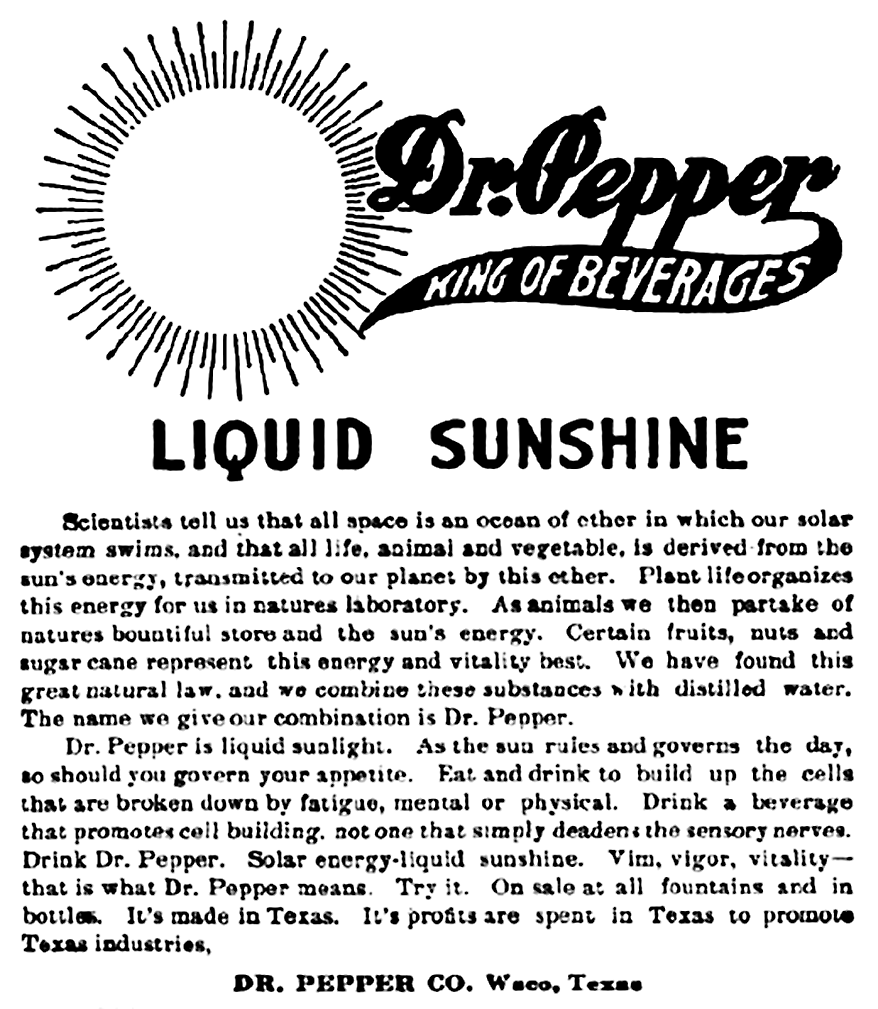
Dr Pepper ad from 1913

The name "Dr. Pepper" was first used commercially in 1885. It preceded the introduction of Coca-Cola by one year. Dr Pepper was introduced nationally at the 1904 Louisiana Purchase Exposition.

It was formulated by Brooklyn-born pharmacist Charles Alderton in Morrison's Old Corner Drug Store in Waco, Texas. To test his new drink, he first offered it to store owner Wade Morrison, who also found it to his liking. Patrons at Morrison's soda fountain soon learned of Alderton's new drink and began ordering a "Waco". Alderton gave the formula to Morrison, who named it Dr. Pepper's Iron Phosphate (later "Dr. Pepper's Phos-Ferrates", and even later simply "Dr Pepper").

Early advertisements for this soft drink made medical claims, stating that it "aids digestion and restores vim, vigor, and vitality."

As with the formula for Coca-Cola, the formula for Dr Pepper is a trade secret; the recipe is allegedly kept as two halves in safe deposit boxes in two separate Dallas banks. A persistent rumor since the 1930s is that the drink contains prune juice. However, the official Dr Pepper FAQ refutes this with "Dr Pepper is a unique blend of natural and artificial flavors; it does not contain prune juice." The origin of the rumor is unknown, and some believe it was started by a deliveryman for a competitor trying to cast aspersions based on prune juice's laxative effects.

In 2009, an old ledger book filled with formulas and recipes was discovered by Bill Waters while shopping at antiques stores in the Texas Panhandle. Several sheets and letterheads hinted it had come from the W.B. Morrison & Co. Old Corner Drug Store (the same store where Dr Pepper was first served in 1885) and faded letters on the book's cover spelled out "Castles Formulas". John Castles was a partner of Morrison's for a time and worked at that location as early as 1880. One recipe in the book titled "Dr Peppers Pepsin Bitters" was of particular interest, and some speculated it could be an early recipe for Dr Pepper. However, Keurig Dr Pepper insists it is not the formula for Dr Pepper, but is instead a medicinal recipe for a digestive aid. The book was put up for auction in May 2009, but no one purchased it.

=== Name ===
Theories about the origins of the soft drink's name abound. One possible reason that the name was chosen was the practice, common at the time of the drink's creation, of including Dr. in the names of products to convey the impression that they were healthful.

A theory often cited is that the drink was named after an actual doctor, one Charles T. Pepper of Rural Retreat, Virginia. Morrison may have named the drink after the doctor in gratitude for Pepper having given Morrison his first job. However, Milly Walker, Collections Manager / Curator for the Dublin (Texas) Dr Pepper Bottling Co. Museum, has stated that US Census records show that a young Morrison lived in Christiansburg, Virginia, 40 miles (64 km) away from Rural Retreat, and that "there is not one piece of evidence that Morrison ever worked for Charles T. Pepper in Rural Retreat". A romanticized origin story posits that Morrison named the soft drink after Charles T. Pepper to win approval to marry his daughter. Historians and archivists, however, have dismissed this claim, noting that the girl was just eight years old when Morrison settled in Waco.

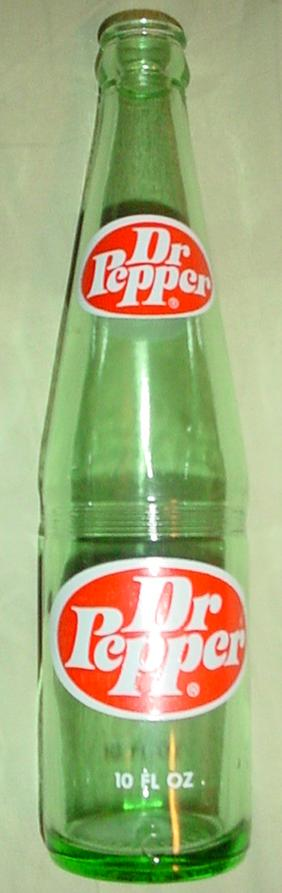
Glass Dr Pepper bottle featuring the 1970s logo

The period (full stop) after Dr was used intermittently in Dr Pepper logos until 1950, when, after some debate, it was discarded permanently, for stylistic and legibility reasons.

=== Legal and trade history ===
In 1951, Dr Pepper sued the Coca-Cola company for $750,000 (equivalent to $7.95 million in 2025), asserting that 6.5-oz. Cokes were sold below cost and were a restraint of trade.

"In 1966, the Food and Drug Administration formally declared Dr. Pepper not to be a cola, allowing Dr. Pepper to use cola bottling franchises off limits to other colas, because of licensing arrangements which provide for exclusive cola territorial assignments." (February 1973) Texas Monthly

In 1969, owing to Dr Pepper's legal success as being determined a "non-cola" soft drink, then President & CEO W. W. "Foots" Clements was successful in persuading the Coca-Cola Bottling Company of New York, the largest bottler and distributor of Coca-Cola in the world, to bottle and distribute Dr Pepper in the New York metropolitan area.

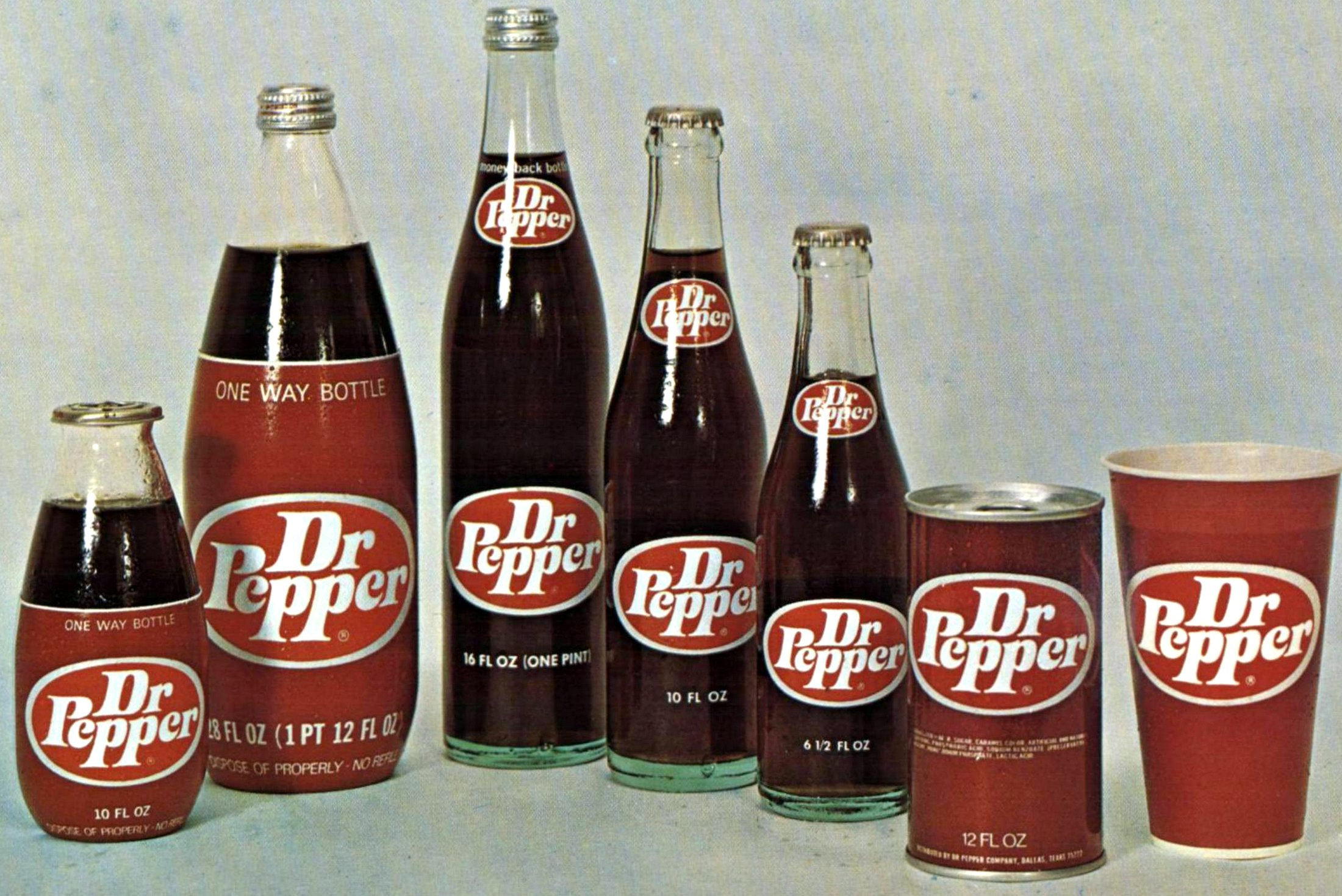
Photo of 1970s Dr Pepper bottles, can and branded cup

In 1972, Dr Pepper sued the Coca-Cola company for trademark infringement based on a soft drink marketed by Coca-Cola called "Peppo". Coca-Cola renamed their beverage Mr. Pibb.

Dr Pepper became insolvent in the early 1980s, prompting an investment group to take the company private. Several years later, Coca-Cola attempted to acquire Dr Pepper, but was blocked from doing so by the Federal Trade Commission (FTC). Around the same time, Seven Up was acquired from Phillip Morris by Hicks & Haas, the same investment company that had purchased Dr Pepper. Upon the failure of the Coca-Cola merger, Dr Pepper and Seven Up merged (creating Dr Pepper/Seven Up, Inc., or DPSU), giving up international branding rights in the process. After the DPSU merger, Coca-Cola obtained most non-US rights to the Dr Pepper name (with PepsiCo taking the Seven Up rights).

Dr Pepper was a frequent player in the 1990s antitrust history of the United States. As part of these activities, economists and the courts have weighed in with the opinion that Dr Pepper is a "pepper" flavored drink and not a "cola". In 1995, the FTC blocked a merger between The Coca-Cola Company and Dr Pepper on grounds that included concerns about a monopoly of the "pepper" flavor category of soft drinks. In 1996, Dr Pepper was involved in an antitrust case involving Jerry Jones, the Dallas Cowboys, NFL Properties, Nike, and other commercial interests active at Texas Stadium in Irving, Texas. Jones had made deals with Dr Pepper and the other companies that, the league said, violated their exclusive marketing contracts with Coca-Cola and other businesses. The NFL agreed to allow Jones and other teams to pursue their own agreements.

In 1995, Cadbury Schweppes acquired Dr Pepper/Seven Up. In May 2008, Cadbury Schweppes spun off Cadbury Schweppes Americas Beverages into an independent company called the Dr Pepper Snapple Group, and renamed itself to Cadbury plc. On July 9, 2018, Keurig acquired the Dr Pepper Snapple Group in an $18.7 billion deal. The combined company was renamed "Keurig Dr Pepper".

== Varieties ==
=== North America ===
==== Regular ====
| Name | Year launched | Notes | Sources |
|---|---|---|---|
| Caffeine Free Dr. Pepper | 1983 | Uncaffeinated version of Dr. Pepper. It was introduced following the success of Pepper Free, its Diet counterpart. | |
| Dr Pepper Red Fusion | 2002 | A cherry-flavored, red-colored variety. It was the first new flavor added to the Dr. Pepper family of beverages in the company's 122-year history. It was released as part of a trend of "variety expansions", which included rival Pepsi Blue and Cadbury-Schweppes' own DnL. Much like with these drinks, Red Fusion was a commercial flop and was discontinued in 2004. | |
| Dr Pepper Cherry Vanilla | 2004 | A cherry vanilla-flavored variety. It was originally released in some areas on October 15, 2004, and was the first in the planned "Soda Fountain Classics" line of beverages from Dr Pepper, a range of drinks designed to taste similar to popular soda fountain drinks from the 1950s. When Dr Pepper Cherry was introduced, Dr Pepper Cherry Vanilla became region-specific and is now only found in select areas. It can also be found in Coca-Cola Freestyle machines that offer Dr Pepper in place of Pibb Xtra. | |
| Dr Pepper Berries and Cream | 2006, 2022 | A berry cream-flavored variety. It was released in most US locations in April 2006 as the second beverage in Dr Pepper's "Soda Fountain Classics" lineup. It was eventually discontinued due to poor sales. But was reintroduced as part of a sweepstakes event in 2022. In Canada, it was sold as a limited edition from September–December 2007, after the limited edition run of its diet counterpart. | |
| Dr Pepper Cherry | 2009 | Dr Pepper with a stronger cherry flavor first released in some areas around February 2009. The beverage tastes similar to Dr Pepper but adds a stronger cherry flavor. | |
| Heritage Dr Pepper | 2009 | A sugar-sweetened version of Dr Pepper, made to represent its formula before switching to high fructose corn syrup by the early 1970s. It first became available around November 2009 as a limited time offering, and was replaced the following year with Dr Pepper Made with Real Sugar. | |
| Dr Pepper Made with Real Sugar | 2010 | A sugar-sweetened version was released to commemorate the drink's 125th anniversary during the summer of 2010 as a permanent variety, replacing Heritage Dr Pepper. This version of the soda featured six collectible 12 oz cans and a 20 oz plastic bottle decorated with Dr Pepper's old slogans and images from the 1960s. When Dublin Dr Pepper was discontinued, Heritage Dr Pepper became its de facto replacement. | |
| Dr Pepper Ten | 2011 | A mid-calorie version of the drink sweetened with a blend of corn syrup, aspartame, and acesulfame potassium, intending on having only ten calories per serving. The product's branding featured a masculine appearance and gunmetal colors, and promotional campaigns that featured the slogan "It's Not for Women", which gained some controversy for its promotional sexism. It was discontinued in 2018 due to low sales. | |
| Dr Pepper Vanilla Float | 2014, 2026 | A vanilla ice cream flavor variant that was sold as a limited edition for the summer of 2014. The drink returned in 2017 and has been periodically sold since then. | |
| Dr Pepper Dark Berry | 2019, 2022 | A limited edition berry-flavored variety released in summer 2019 to promote the film Spider-Man: Far From Home. It was later brought back 2022 to promote Jurassic World: Dominion. | |
| Dr Pepper & Cream Soda | 2020 | A cream soda flavored variety. | |
| Dr Pepper Strawberries and Cream | 2023 | A strawberry cream-flavored version of Dr. Pepper that was initially released as a limited edition for Valentine's Day, but became a permanent edition afterward. | |
| Dr Pepper Creamy Coconut | 2024, 2026 | A coconut-flavored version of Dr. Pepper. It was sold as a limited edition for the summer of 2024. It was brought back by popular demand in Spring 2026. | |
| Dr Pepper Blackberry | 2025 | A blackberry-flavored variant introduced in February 2025 as a new permanent variety. | |

==== Diet ====
| Name | Year launched | Notes | Sources |
|---|---|---|---|
| Diet Dr. Pepper | 1962 (cans), 1963 (bottles) | Low-calorie Dr. Pepper. It was originally introduced as "Dietary Dr. Pepper", but was renamed "Sugar Free Dr. Pepper" in 1966 due to slow sales, partly due to the public misconception that the drink was for diabetics. The name was changed again to Diet Dr Pepper in 1987. After posting a 6.4% gain in sales volume, it became the 10th best-selling soda in 2006, according to Beverage Digest magazine. From 1991 to 2006, the beverage was marketed using the slogan "Diet Dr Pepper tastes more like Regular Dr Pepper." In 2006, a new marketing campaign was launched comparing the taste of Diet Dr Pepper to desserts instead of regular Dr Pepper with the slogan "There's nothing diet about it." | |
| Caffeine Free Diet Dr. Pepper | 1982 | Diet Dr. Pepper without the Caffeine. It was first introduced to test markets in 1982 as Pepper Free, produced as a separate brand citing company research that indicated a need for a product to fill a niche for the health-conscious consumer. The Pepper Free brand lasted for only three years and was phased out in 1985. Although a caffeine-free dietetic product continues to be produced under various name permutations, the reason for pulling the Pepper Free brand is unknown, but could have been due to confusion with the rival "Pepsi Free" brand ("Caffeine-Free Pepsi"). | |
| Diet Dr Pepper Cherry Vanilla | 2004 | Low-calorie version of Cherry Vanilla Dr. Pepper. It is sold in limited areas of the United States and is currently the only flavor variant of Diet Dr Pepper. | |
| Diet Dr Pepper Berries and Cream | 2006 | Low-calorie version of Dr Pepper Berries and Cream. It was sold and discontinued at the same time as its standard variety. In Canada, it was sold as a limited edition from May to August 2007. | |
| Diet Cherry Chocolate Dr Pepper | 2007 | A low-calorie cherry and chocolate flavored variety. It was introduced as a limited edition flavor on November 21, 2007, before its run in April 2008. It was exclusively made as a diet variety, with a standard version never being made. The taste is similar to Canfield's Diet Cherry Chocolate Fudge Soda, but with the distinctive Dr Pepper flavor. It became available in Canada in early January 2008 for a limited time. | |
| Diet Dr Pepper Cherry | 2009 | Low-calorie version of Dr Pepper Cherry. It was discontinued in 2021 and replaced with a Zero Sugar version. | |
| Diet Dr Pepper & Cream Soda | 2020 | Low-calorie version of Dr Pepper Cream Soda. It was discontinued the following year and was replaced with a Zero Sugar version. | |

==== Zero Sugar ====
| Name | Year launched | Notes | Sources |
|---|---|---|---|
| Dr Pepper Zero Sugar | 2021 | A low-calorie version of Dr Pepper made to taste more like the original. | |
| Dr Pepper Cherry Zero Sugar | 2021 | A low-calorie version of Dr Pepper Cherry made to taste more like the original. It replaced the Diet version of the drink. | |
| Dr Pepper & Cream Soda Zero Sugar | 2021 | A low-calorie version of Dr Pepper and Cream Soda made to taste more like the original. It replaced the Diet version of the drink. | |
| Dr Pepper Strawberries and Cream Zero Sugar | 2023 | A low-calorie version of Dr. Pepper Strawberries and Cream. | |
| Dr Pepper Creamy Coconut Zero Sugar | 2024, 2026 | A low-calorie version of Dr. Pepper Creamy Coconut. As with the standard variety, it was sold as a limited edition for the summer. It was brought back by popular demand in Spring 2026. | |
| Dr Pepper Blackberry Zero Sugar | 2025 | A low-calorie version of Dr Pepper Blackberry | |

=== Other Regions ===
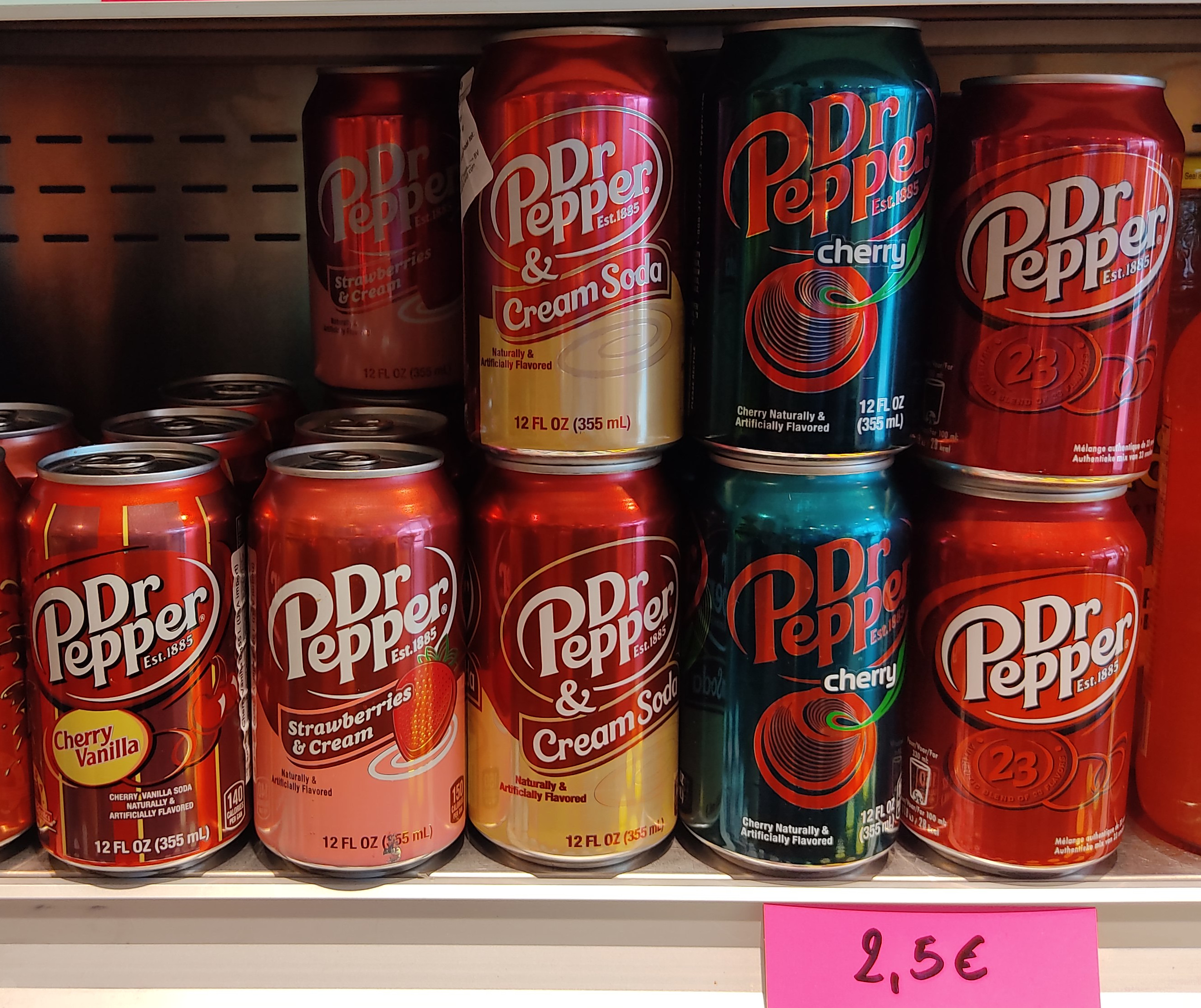
In a shop in Ghent (Belgium)

| Name | Country | Year launched | Notes | Sources |
|---|---|---|---|---|
| Dr Pepper | United Kingdom | 1982 | United Kingdom's version of Dr Pepper, along with various other countries, is manufactured with sugar instead of high fructose corn syrup (much like Heritage Dr Pepper in the United States). It was initially produced by Britvic in April 1982, and then Coca-Cola Enterprises in the late 90s. In August 2014, the UK version was reformulated, adding the artificial sweeteners Aspartame and Acesulfame K, which reduces the amount of sugar from 10.3 g per 100 ml to 7.2 g. In 2018, due to the Sugary drink tax implanted in the UK, the sugar was reduced to 4.9 g. | |
| Dr Pepper Zero | United Kingdom | 1986 | Low-calorie version of the British Dr Pepper. It was first released as Diet Dr Pepper and was initially sweetened with Saccharin before switching to Aspartame in 1992. It was renamed Dr Pepper Z in 2005 as part of a relaunch of Coca-Cola's "Light" varieties before changing to this name in 2006. | |
| Dr Pepper | Germany; The Netherlands; Poland | 1980s | The German version of Dr. Pepper, produced by Krombacher Brauerei since 2006, originally used a similar formula to the UK version. It was at some point reformulated with Sucralose and Acesulfame K, with a lower sugar amount than the initial UK sweetener reformulation. Other countries like the Netherlands and Poland (distributed through Orangina Schweppes), also use this formula. | |
| Dr Pepper Cherry | Germany; Poland | 2016; 2020s (Poland) | A cherry-flavored variant of the German version of Dr Pepper. As with the standard variety, Cherry also contains artificial sweeteners. The same variant was released in Poland in the 2010s by Orangina Schweppes. | |
| Dr Pepper Energy | Germany; Poland | 2017 | A Dr Pepper energy drink variant containing extra caffeine and taurine. Unlike the other varieties, Energy does not contain artificial sweeteners. | |
| Dr Pepper Zero Sugar | Germany | 2016 | Zero sugar variant of Dr Pepper, sweetened with Sucralose and Acesulfame K. | |
| Dr Pepper Vanilla Float | Germany; Poland | 2022 | A vanilla-flavored variant of the German version of Dr Pepper released on March 22, 2022. Vanilla Float does not contain any artificial sweeteners unlike the standard and Cherry variants. The Polish version however, does contain sweeteners. | |
| Dr Pepper Dark Berry | Mexico | 2024 | Mexican release of Dr Pepper Dark Berry. It uses a similar formula to the US version. | |
| Dr Pepper Strawberries & Cream | Mexico | 2024 | Mexican release of Dr Pepper Dark Berry. It uses a similar formula to the US version. | |
| Dr Pepper Zero Sugar Cherry Crush | United Kingdom | 2025 | A cherry-flavored variant of the UK Dr Pepper. Originally released at the end of January 2025 as a limited edition flavor for Valentine's Day, high sales led to it becoming a permanent addition to the range. | |
| Dr Pepper Cream Swirl | United Kingdom | 2026 | A Cream Soda flavored variant of the UK Dr Pepper. It was released at the end of February 2026 as a year-long limited edition variety. | |

== Distribution ==
In the US, fully national distribution was not achieved until 1960. As late as 1959, national advertising referenced this: "folks lucky enough to live where it can be bought." Presently, Keurig Dr Pepper relies on its own bottling group to bottle and distribute its products in more than 30 US states, as well as in Canada and Mexico; in Mexico, this is carried out through its subsidiary Grupo Peñafiel. Coca-Cola and Pepsi have essentially stopped bottling and distributing Cadbury-Schweppes products in favor of in-house alternatives, although regional exceptions can be found.

In the United Kingdom, the drink is produced and distributed by Coca-Cola Europacific Partners. Coca-Cola also handles the distribution of the product in Japan.

In Germany, brewery Krombacher Brauerei acquired distribution rights in 2006.

In most European territories, such as Sweden, the Netherlands, Slovakia, Austria, the Czech Republic, Belgium and Norway, Cadbury-Schweppes originally released Dr Pepper in-house until the 2008 split, of which the international drinks division was renamed Orangina-Schweppes. Suntory acquired the company in late 2009, and currently holds distribution in these territories.

In Finland, Dr Pepper is bottled by Sinebrychoff, which also bottles Coca-Cola Company's products.

Dr Pepper is available in Russia (though imported, generally from Poland – there's no local bottling), South Korea and Ukraine. Although no longer locally bottled in Australia or New Zealand, Dr Pepper is imported and sold by United States Foods, and many other small retailers in Australia, with the UK (sugar) version sold in the British sections of Coles and Woolworths supermarkets. Dr Pepper and Dr Pepper Cherry are available in Serbia only at selected NIS petrol and Gazprom petrol gas stations in 0.33L cans. Dr Pepper is not available in Thailand and North Korea. It is sold in Indonesia, where it is imported by PT Citra Gourmand Prima (formerly PT Armasco Prima) with its office in Sunter, North Jakarta.

== Other products ==
- Dr Pepper has a line of jelly beans made by the Jelly Belly company.
- Hubba Bubba bubblegum produces a Dr Pepper-flavored edition. The gum is the same color as the soda.
- Dr Pepper collaborated with Vita Food Products to produce Dr Pepper Sweet & Kickin' BBQ Sauce and Dr Pepper "More than Mesquite" Marinade.
- Cosmetics company Bonne Bell includes Dr Pepper among its licensed soft drink-flavored "Lip Smackers" lip balms.
- Brach's has a line of hard candy that features Dr Pepper, Orange Crush, A&W Root Beer and 7 Up flavored hard candies in Brach's Soda Poppers.
- Dr Pepper has an ice cream topping syrup also manufactured by Vita Food Products in 2009 called "Dr Pepper cherry dessert topping".
- Dr Pepper also created an iPod skin cover, but it was discontinued.
- Dr Pepper Slurpee is sold by retailer 7-Eleven.
- Dr Pepper Flavored Freezies are available with Grape Crush and Hires Root Beer flavors.
- The Serious Bean Company makes a variety of baked beans using Dr Pepper in the sauce.
- Dr Pepper collaborated with Tic-tac Mints in the fall of 2025 to produce Dr Pepper Tic Tacs.

== Marketing ==
"Dr Pepper Time", according to one promotion, was at 10, 2 and 4 o'clock. During World War II, a syndicated radio program, The 10–2–4 Ranch (later titled 10–2–4 Time), aired in the Southern United States and other areas where Dr Pepper was distributed. The show featured the Sons of the Pioneers and Dick Foran. In the 1960s, the tune of the chorus of "The Glow-Worm" was used in ads, with lyrics which ended, "It's Dr Pepper Time!"

In the early 1960s, Dr Pepper promoted the idea of serving the drink hot with lemon slices in winter. This idea appeared in the film Blast from the Past initially set in the early 1960s. Also from around this same time period the phrase 'not a cola, not a root beer' was used in an advertising jingle for Dr Pepper.

Around 1967, Dr Pepper released the "Charge" ad:

Charge!!
Get Going Again,
With the Dr Pepper Difference.

In 1977, Jake Holmes wrote the lyrics to "Be a Pepper". Earlier in the 1970s, Holmes and Randy Newman wrote another jingle entitled "The Most Original Soft Drink Ever". Barry Manilow performed Holmes's jingle in concerts and on albums under the inclusion of "VSM – Very Strange Medley". A TV commercial was also created using the jingle and ran from 1977 to 1985. The song noted "It's not a cola, it's something much much more. It's not a root beer, you get root beer by the score." The "Be a Pepper" series referred to fans of Dr Pepper as "Peppers" and often featured large crowd dance scenes, intricately choreographed by Tony Stevens and led onscreen by actor David Naughton. The chorus of the jingle as written by Holmes was:

I'm a Pepper, he's a Pepper,
She's a Pepper, we're a Pepper,
Wouldn't you like to be a Pepper, too?
Be a Pepper. Drink Dr Pepper.

This became grist for a number of pop culture references and parodies. One of the first was a July 1981 sketch on the program SCTV, in which an overly-excited injured man (Eugene Levy) extols the work of a "Dr Shekter" (Rick Moranis) who has been treating him. Levy and a group of patients wearing casts and crutches engage in their own elaborate dancing and singing ("Wouldn't you like to see my doctor, too?"), which Shekter first uses as an opportunity to explain his work, and then grows alarmed ("These people should not be dancing!"). In the 1982 film The Beach Girls, the slogan became "I'm a popper, he's a popper..."

W.W. Clements, former CEO and president of the Dr Pepper/7-Up Company, described the taste of Dr Pepper as one-of-a-kind, saying, "I've always maintained you cannot tell anyone what Dr Pepper tastes like because it's so different. It's not an apple, it's not an orange, it's not a strawberry, it's not a root beer, it's not even a cola. It's a different kind of drink with a unique taste all its own."

The 1980s "Out of the Ordinary" advertising campaign involved a series of post-apocalyptic commercials featuring a space cowboy and an alien sidekick seeking "something different" from a simple generic cola. The campaign also produced commercials featuring the movie creature Godzilla, where citizens of a Japanese town offered Dr Pepper as a libation. The commercials were prominently featured during the 1986 syndication of The Canned Film Festival, which was sponsored by the Dr Pepper Company.

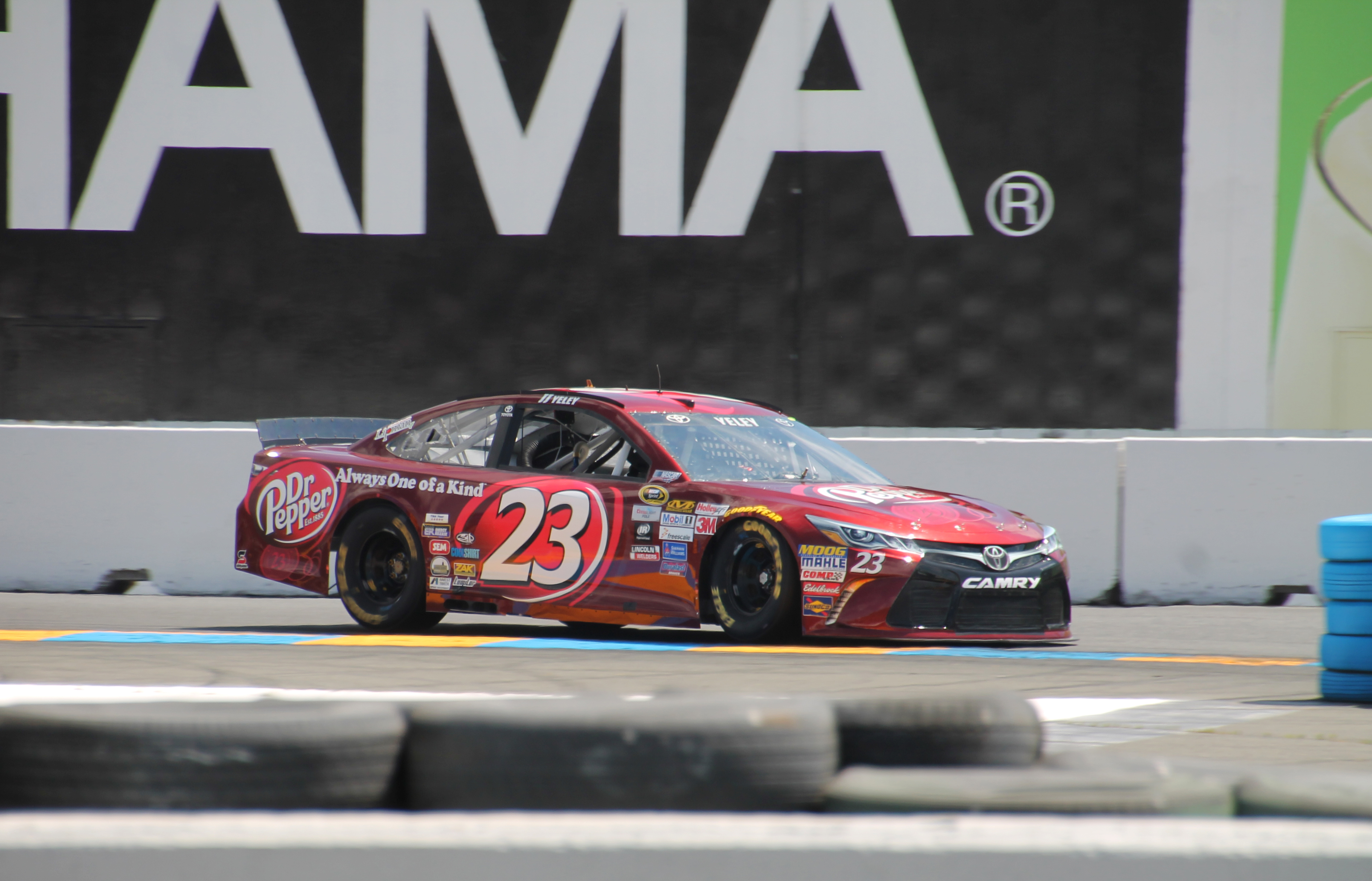
The No. 23 Dr Pepper-sponsored Toyota Camry driven by J. J. Yeley of the NASCAR Sprint Cup Series in 2015

As of 2009, the slogan of the product was "Drink it slow. Doctor's orders". Advertising supporting the slogan has celebrities with famous relations to the word "doctor" (Dr. Dre, Julius "Dr. J" Erving, Gene Simmons (writer of the Kiss song "Calling Dr. Love"), et al.) or who played fictional doctors (such as Neil Patrick Harris or Kelsey Grammer) endorsing the beverage. The ads culminate with the celebrity stating, "Trust me. I'm a doctor", followed by the new slogan appearing onscreen with a glass of Dr Pepper.

The introduction of Dr Pepper Ten in 2011 featured a marketing campaign targeting men, citing market research suggesting that most diet soft drinks had been perceived as appealing primarily to women. The campaign featured overtly masculine imagery, including an action movie-themed television commercial denouncing other diet beverages as "lady drinks", a Facebook page featuring "Man'Ments", and the slogan "It's Not for Women". Some critics considered the campaign to be sexist.

=== Dr Pepper Girl ===
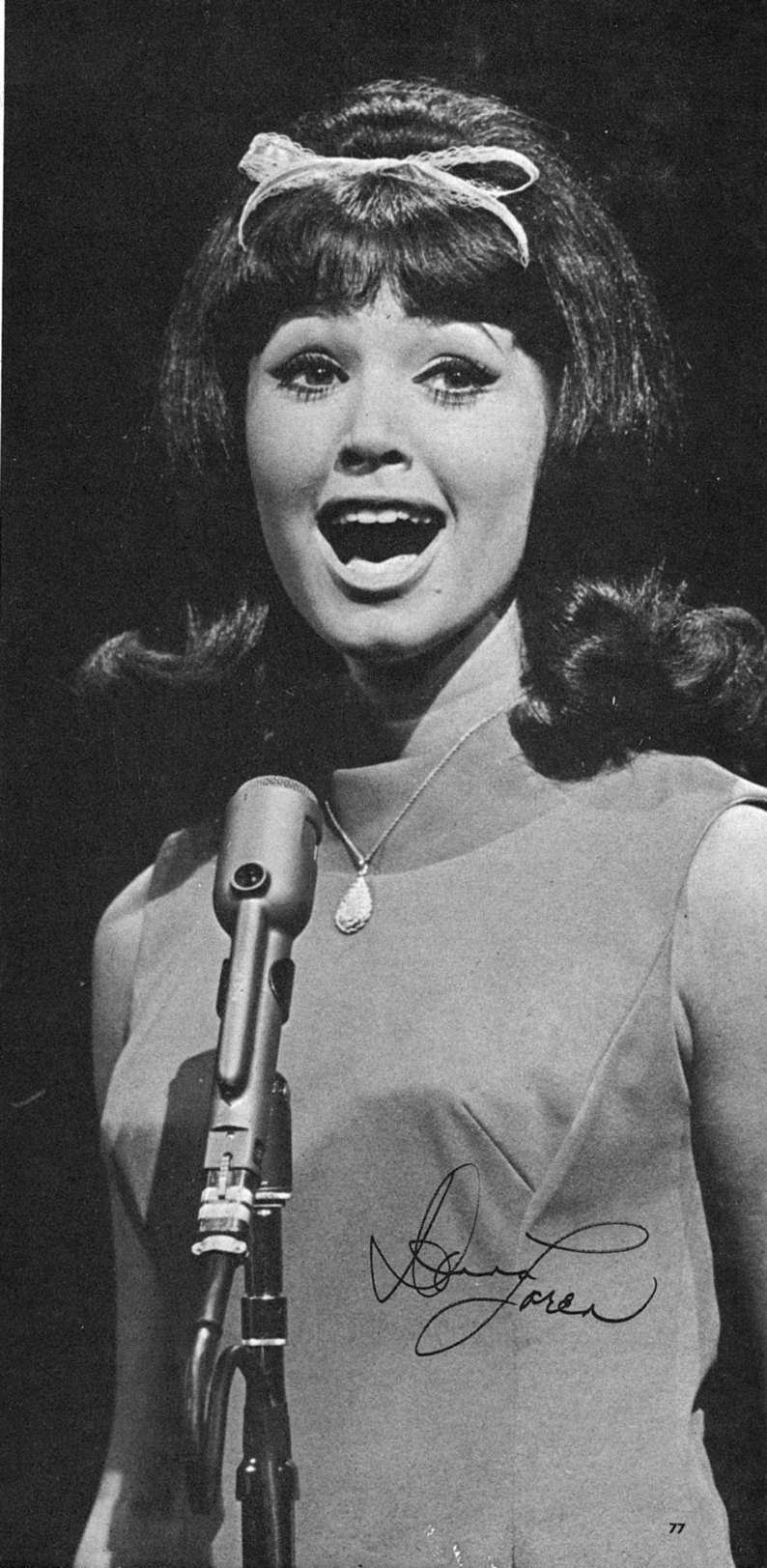
Donna Loren (seen here performing on ABC-TV's Shindig!) was the Dr Pepper Girl from 1963 to 1968.

In 1963, singer Donna Loren became a spokesperson for the company when she was selected in a nationwide search to be the "Dr Pepper Girl". National exposure followed for Loren as she promoted the drink via radio, print, television, calendars, billboards, and personal appearances. One of her first appearances for the company was as co-host with Dick Clark (whom she worked with regularly) of an ABC television special, Dr Pepper Celebrity Party.

Donna Loren subsequently made hundreds of singing and personal appearances for Dr Pepper. In Dr Pepper—King of Beverages, Dr Pepper historian Harry E. Ellis wrote, "Sparkly, vivacious and gifted with a wonderful voice, Donna was an immediate success. She became widely known in a short period as "The Dr Pepper Girl", appearing at special events and on programs sponsored by the company. Miss Loren would figure prominently in Dr Pepper's plans for some five years, not only as an entertainer but doing commercials for radio and TV and appearing in many forms of advertising. She appeared on 24-sheet poster boards, point-of-sale and on Dr Pepper calendars."

Loren's role as Dr Pepper spokesperson led to her first appearance in the American International Pictures' Beach Party film Muscle Beach Party. Loren later explained: "Dr Pepper was involved in that [the Beach Party movies] and actually placed me as product placement. And because I could sing, they gave me a duet with Dick Dale, and then it just went on from there." From this, she went on to appear in three more Beach Party films. Away from the company, Loren was a familiar presence in the 1960s due to her many performances on television, films, and her records for Capitol, Reprise and other labels. She represented Dr Pepper until 1968.

From 1961 until 1981, Dr Pepper was also the sponsor of the Miss Teenage America beauty pageant.

=== Free Dr Pepper for everyone in America ===
On March 26, 2008, various media outlets reported that Dr Pepper would offer "a free can of Dr Pepper to everyone in America" – excluding former Guns N' Roses guitarists Buckethead and Slash – if the band released the long-awaited Chinese Democracy in 2008. Later in the day, lead vocalist Axl Rose replied to Dr Pepper on Guns N' Roses' official website and spoke of his surprise at Dr Pepper's support. Rose also said he would share his Dr Pepper with Buckethead as "some of Buckethead's performances are on Chinese Democracy". After it was announced that the album would be released in 2008, Dr Pepper stated that it would uphold its pledge.

Dr Pepper's online distribution of free coupons upon the album's release November 23, 2008, proved inadequate. Lawyers for the band threatened Dr Pepper's parent company with a lawsuit two days after the album's release. In a letter to Dr Pepper, Rose's lawyer Alan Gutman said, "The redemption scheme your company clumsily implemented for this offer was an unmitigated disaster which defrauded consumers and, in the eyes of vocal fans, ruined Chinese Democracy's release." Rose's lawyer also demanded that the company make a full-page apology that would appear in The Wall Street Journal, USA Today, The New York Times and The Los Angeles Times. In a later interview, Rose claimed he told his lawyers it was a non-issue and was surprised by their actions.

=== "Dr Pepper Capital of the World" ===
John William "Bill" Davis opened Virginia's first Dr. Pepper plant east of the Mississippi in Roanoke in 1936. The city has been named the "Dr Pepper Capital of the World" and broke world records for its consumption of Dr Pepper in the late 1950s. As of 2006 the company sells more Dr Pepper in the Roanoke Valley area of Virginia than any other metropolitan area east of the Mississippi River. In October 2015, the city of Roanoke celebrated October 24 as "Dr Pepper Day".

=== Museum ===
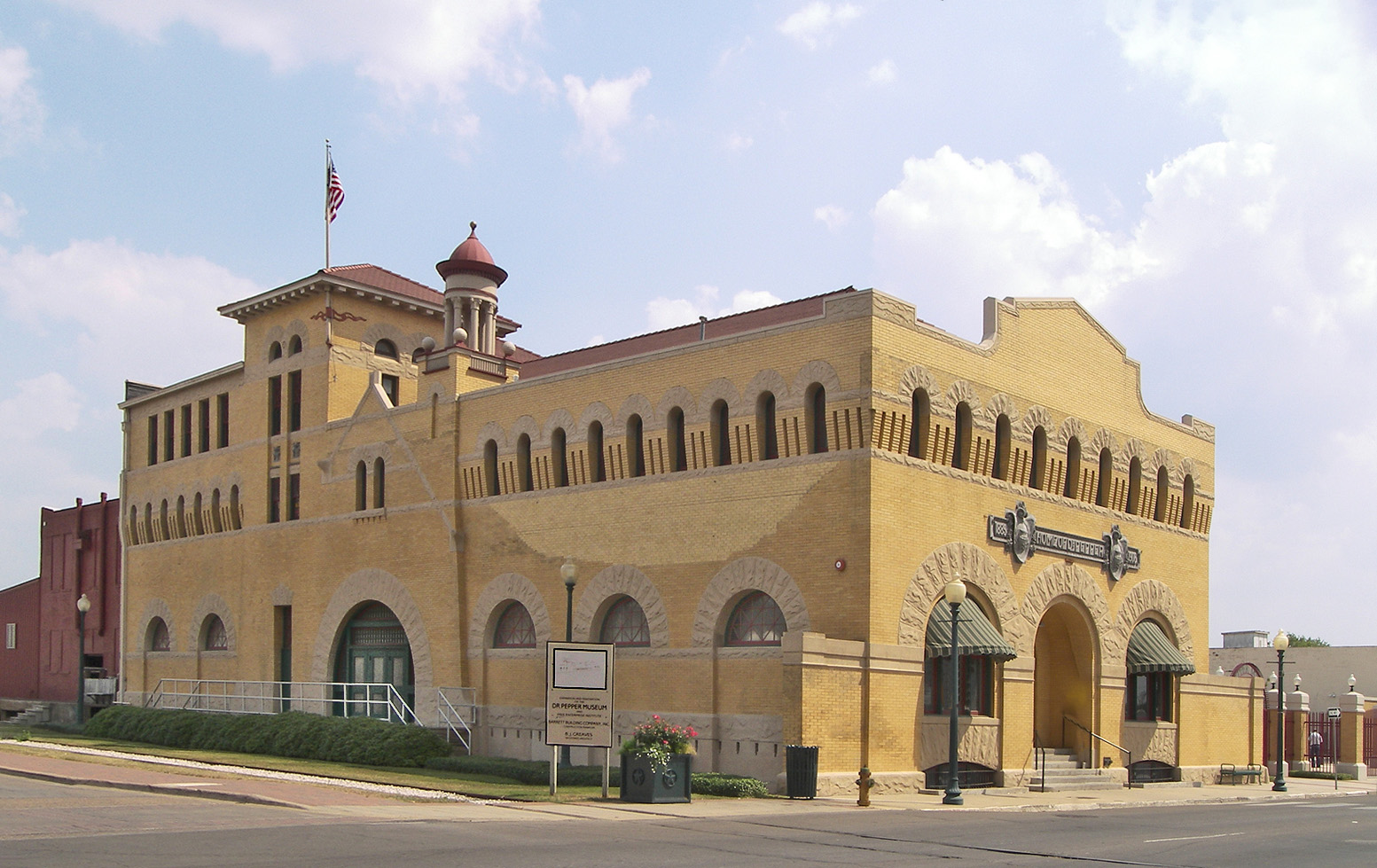
The Artesian Manufacturing and Bottling Company building in Waco, Texas, is on the National Register of Historic Places.

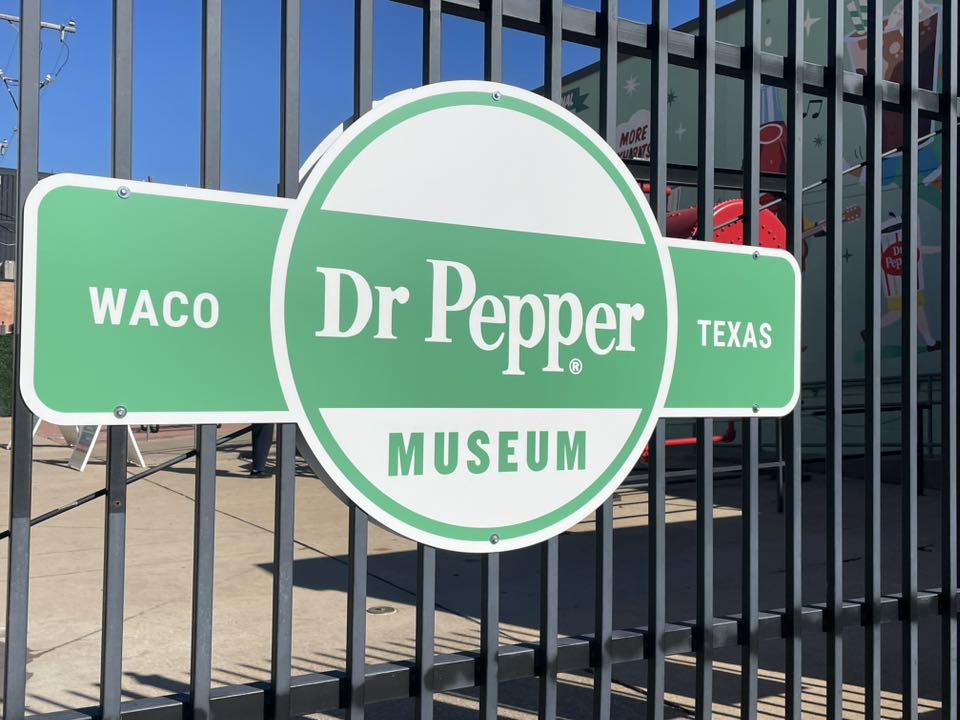
The entrance of the Dr. Pepper Museum.

The Dr Pepper Museum, located in the Artesian Manufacturing and Bottling Company building in Waco, Texas, opened to the public in 1989. The building, completed in 1906, was the first to be built specifically to bottle Dr Pepper, with production continuing until 1965.

=== 2026 viral commercial ===
In December 2025, TikToker Romeo Bingham (@romeosshow) posted a short, catchy jingle she created for Dr Pepper. The 11-second video featured her singing: "Dr Pepper, baby, it's good and nice. Doo doo doo." She tagged Dr Pepper and asked them to "get back to me with a proposition we can make thousands together". The video went viral and they replied to her in the comments. Dr Pepper licensed the jingle and featured it in a 15-second official commercial that aired during the College Football Playoff National Championship game on January 19, 2026.
