= Charles Alderton =

American pharmacist and inventor of Dr Pepper

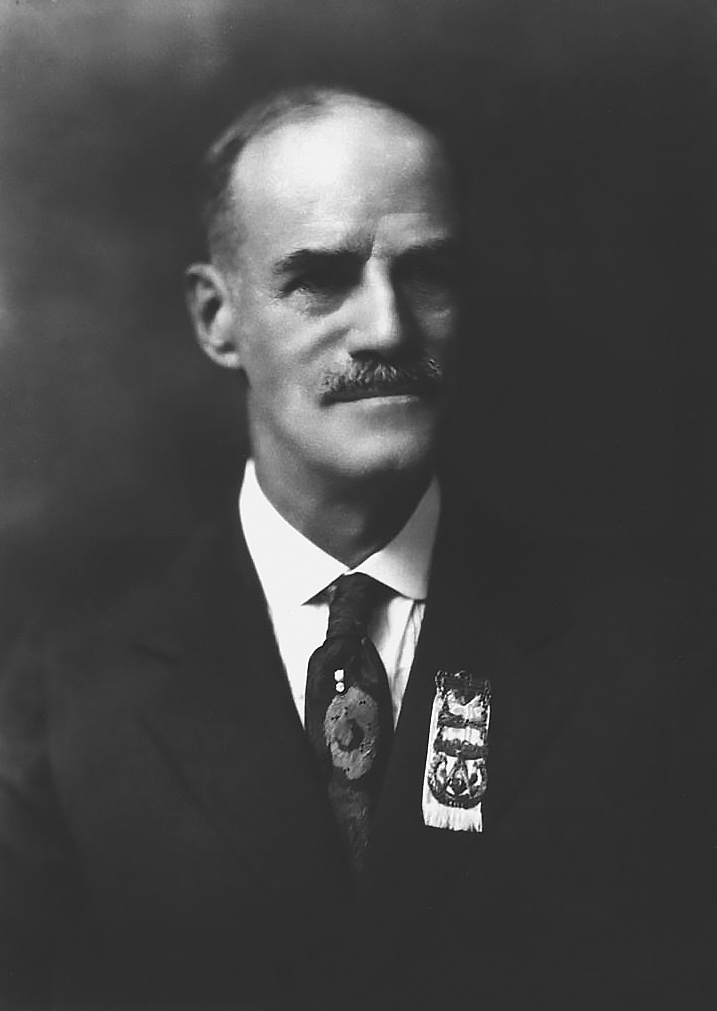
- Born: Charles Courtice Alderton; June 21, 1857; Brooklyn, New York City, U.S.
- Died: May 29, 1941 (aged 83); Waco, Texas, U.S.
- Resting place: Oakwood Cemetery; Waco, Texas, U.S.
- Education: Framlingham College; University of Texas
- Occupations: Pharmacist, Inventor
- Known for: Inventor of Dr Pepper
- Spouses: Lillie E. Walker (1884); Emilie Marie Coquille (1918)

Charles Courtice Alderton (June 21, 1857 – May 29, 1941) was an American pharmacist and the inventor of the carbonated soft drink Dr Pepper.

== Early life ==
Charles Courtice Alderton was born June 21, 1857, in Brooklyn, New York City, the eldest of five children to English parents Charles Alderton Sr. and Hephzebah Courtice. His father Charles Alderton Sr. was born in Cuckfield, West Sussex in 1832.

After an early education in New York, Alderton attended Framlingham College in England, studied medicine at the University of Texas Medical Branch at Galveston, and worked as a pharmacist in Waco, in a shop called "Morrison's Old Corner Drug Store", which had a soda fountain.

== Creation of Dr Pepper ==
Alderton noticed that customers were tired of the traditional flavors of sarsaparilla, lemon and vanilla, and so to try and revive sales, began experimenting with new flavor combinations, eventually settling on a 23 ingredient mix combined with phosphoric acid to give it tang. It was first sold on December 1, 1885, and was ordered by asking the soda attendant to "shoot a Waco".

Alderton gave the formula to the owner of Morrison's Old Corner Drug Store, Wade Morrison, who then named it Dr Pepper.

It was introduced to almost 20 million people while attending the 1904 World's Fair Exposition in St. Louis, Missouri as a new kind of soft drink. Its introduction in 1885 preceded the introduction of Coca-Cola by one year.

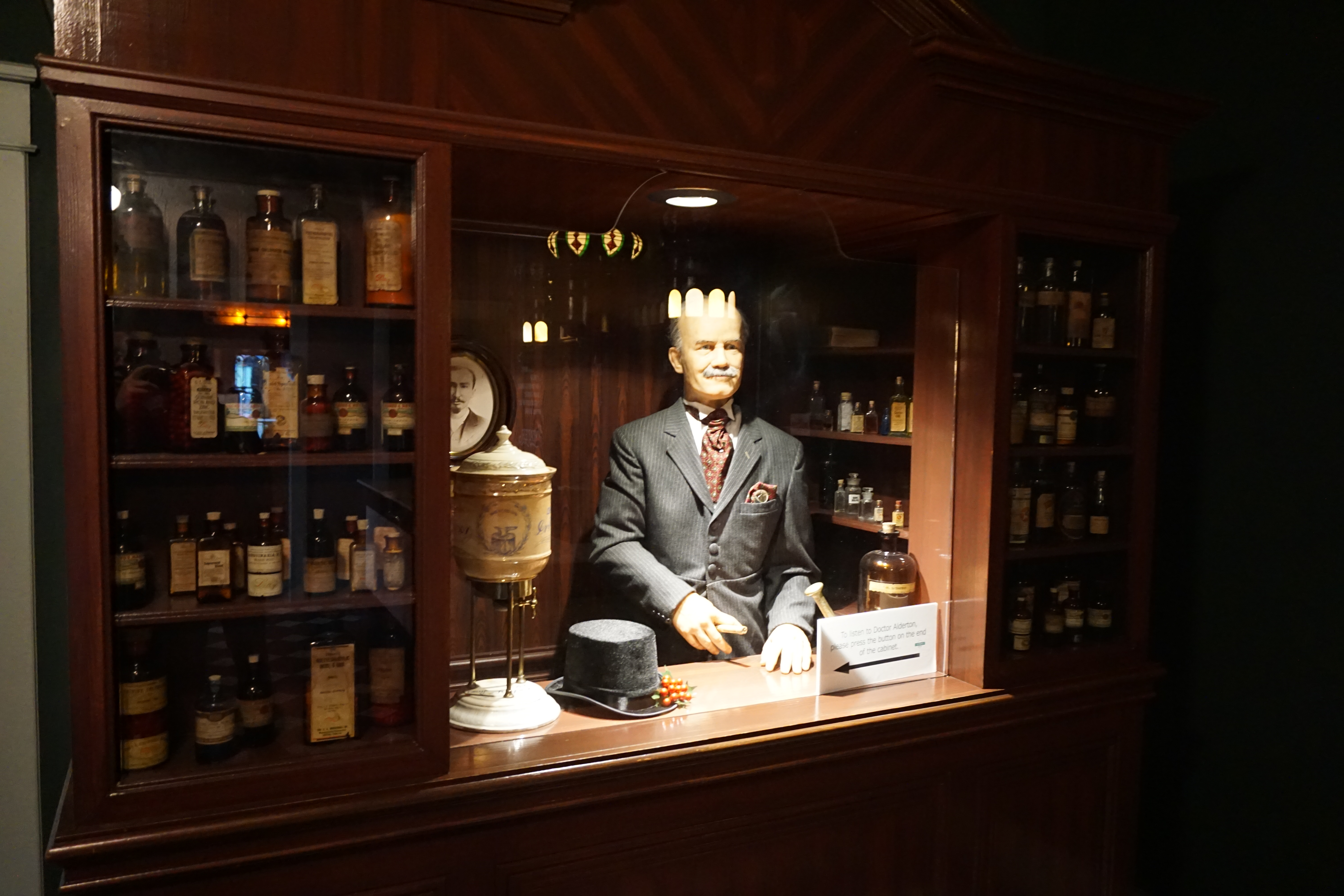
Corner Drug Store exhibit at the Dr. Pepper Museum in Waco, Texas.

Completed in 1906, the Artesian Manufacturing and Bottling Company, located at 300 South Fifth Street in downtown Waco, Texas, was the first building to be built specifically to bottle Dr Pepper and Dr Pepper was bottled there until the 1960s. The building now houses the Dr Pepper Museum, which opened to the public in 1991. The museum has three floors of exhibits, a working old-fashioned soda fountain, and a gift store of Dr Pepper memorabilia.

== Personal life ==
Alderton married twice in his life. His first wife was Lilian "Lillie" E. Walker, whom he married in October 1884. It was announced in the Galveston, Texas, newspaper. They married at the residence of Lillie's father J. B. Walker. Lillie died in 1916. Alderton married Emilie Marie Coquille on December 20, 1918, in New Orleans, Louisiana.

== Death ==
Alderton died on May 29, 1941 in Waco, Texas at the age of 82. He is buried in Waco's Oakwood Cemetery.
