= List of railway museums =

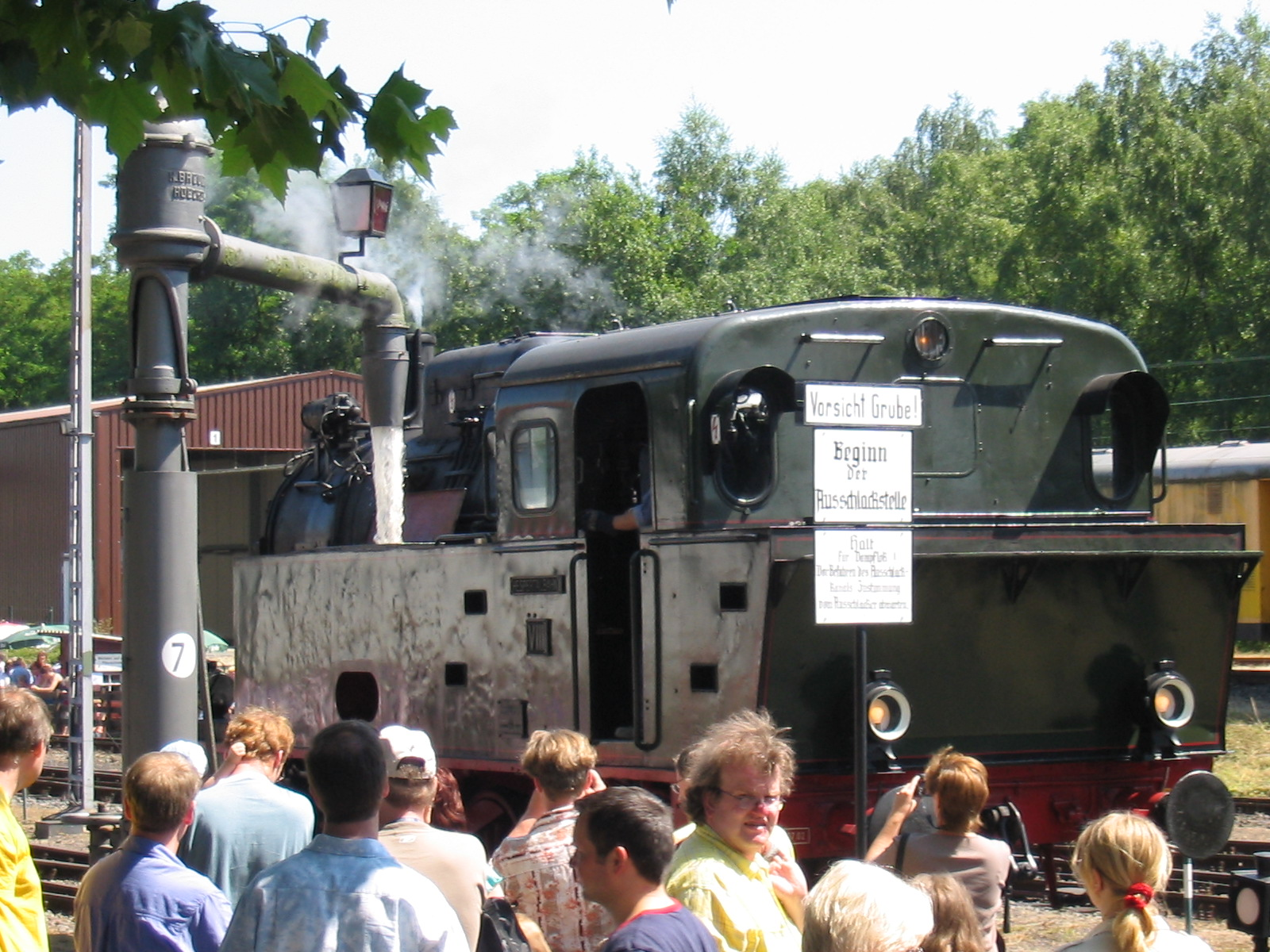
The Eisenbahnmuseum Bochum-Dahlhausen is a railway museum situated south of the city of Bochum in the state of North Rhine-Westphalia, Germany

A railway museum is a museum that explores the history of all aspects of rail related transportation, including: locomotives (steam, diesel, and electric), railway cars, trams, and railway signalling equipment. They may also operate historic equipment on museum grounds.

== Africa ==
=== Egypt ===
- Egyptian Railway Museum (Cairo)

=== Kenya ===
- Nairobi Railway Museum in Nairobi

=== Nigeria ===
- NRC/Legacy Railway Museum in Lagos

=== Senegal ===
- Musée Régional de Thiès in Thiès (Showroom to the Dakar–Niger Railway line)

=== Sierra Leone ===
- Sierra Leone National Railway Museum in Freetown

=== South Africa ===
- Outeniqua Transport Museum in George, Western Cape.
- South African National Railway And Steam Museum

=== Sudan ===
- Sudan Railways Museum in Atbarah

=== Uganda ===
- Uganda Railway Museum in Jinja

=== Zambia ===
- Railway Museum in Livingstone

=== Zimbabwe ===
- Bulawayo Railway Museum in Bulawayo.

== Asia ==
=== Armenia ===
- Armenian Railways Museum, Yerevan

=== Azerbaijan ===
- Azerbaijan Railway Museum, Baku

=== China ===
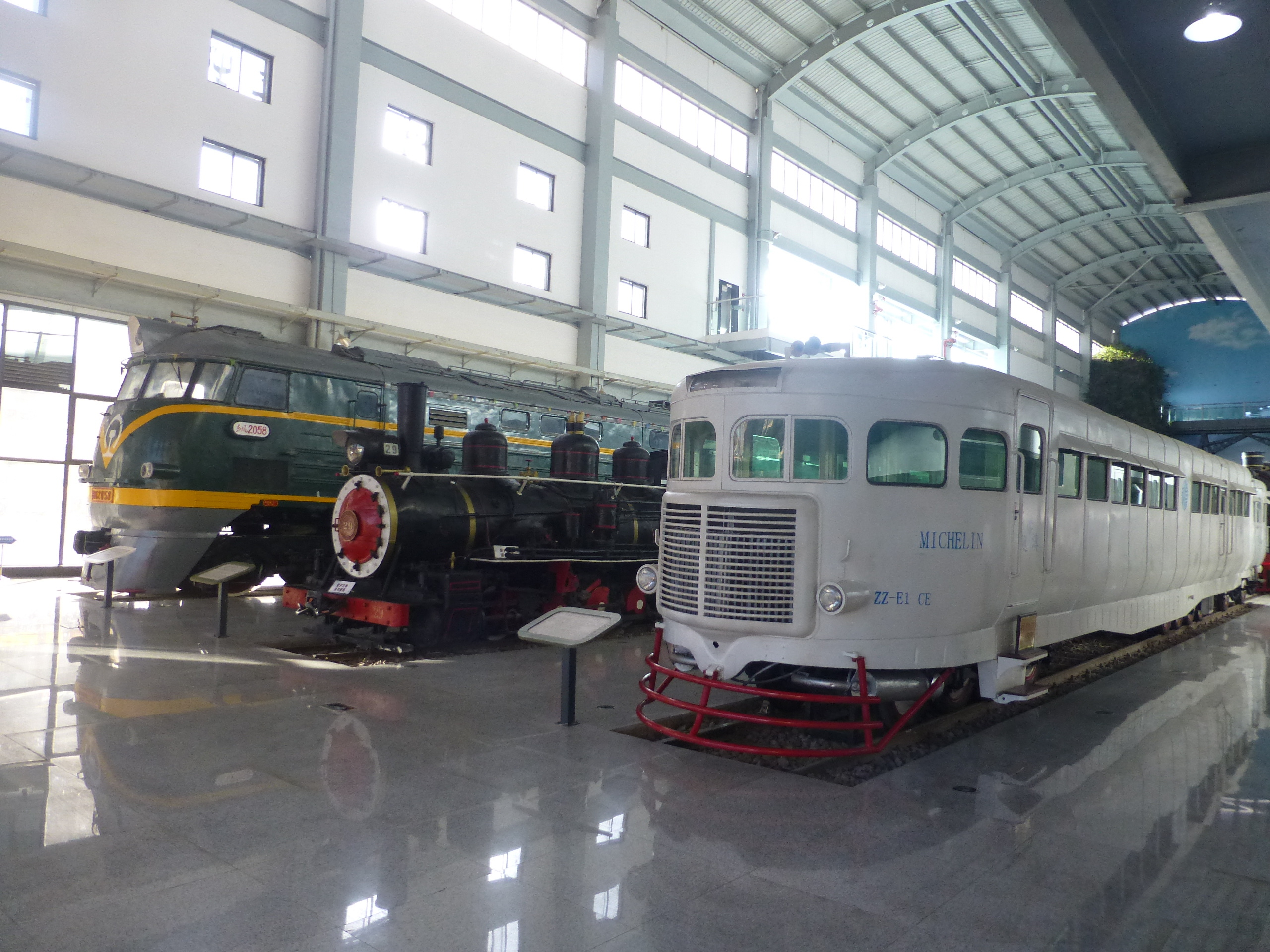
1,435 mm, 600 mm, and 1,000 mm vehicles in Yunnan Railway Museum

- Chan T'ien-yu Memorial Hall, Badaling, Beijing
- China Railway Museum, Beijing
- Da'anbei Railway Station, Da'an, Jilin Province
- Hong Kong Railway Museum
- Qingdao-Jinan Railway Museum, Jinan, Shandong Province
- Shanghai Railway Museum, Shanghai
- Shenyang Railway Museum, Shenyang, Liaoning Province
- Wuhan Metro Museum, Wuhan, Hubei Province
- Yunnan Railway Museum, Kunming, Yunnan Province

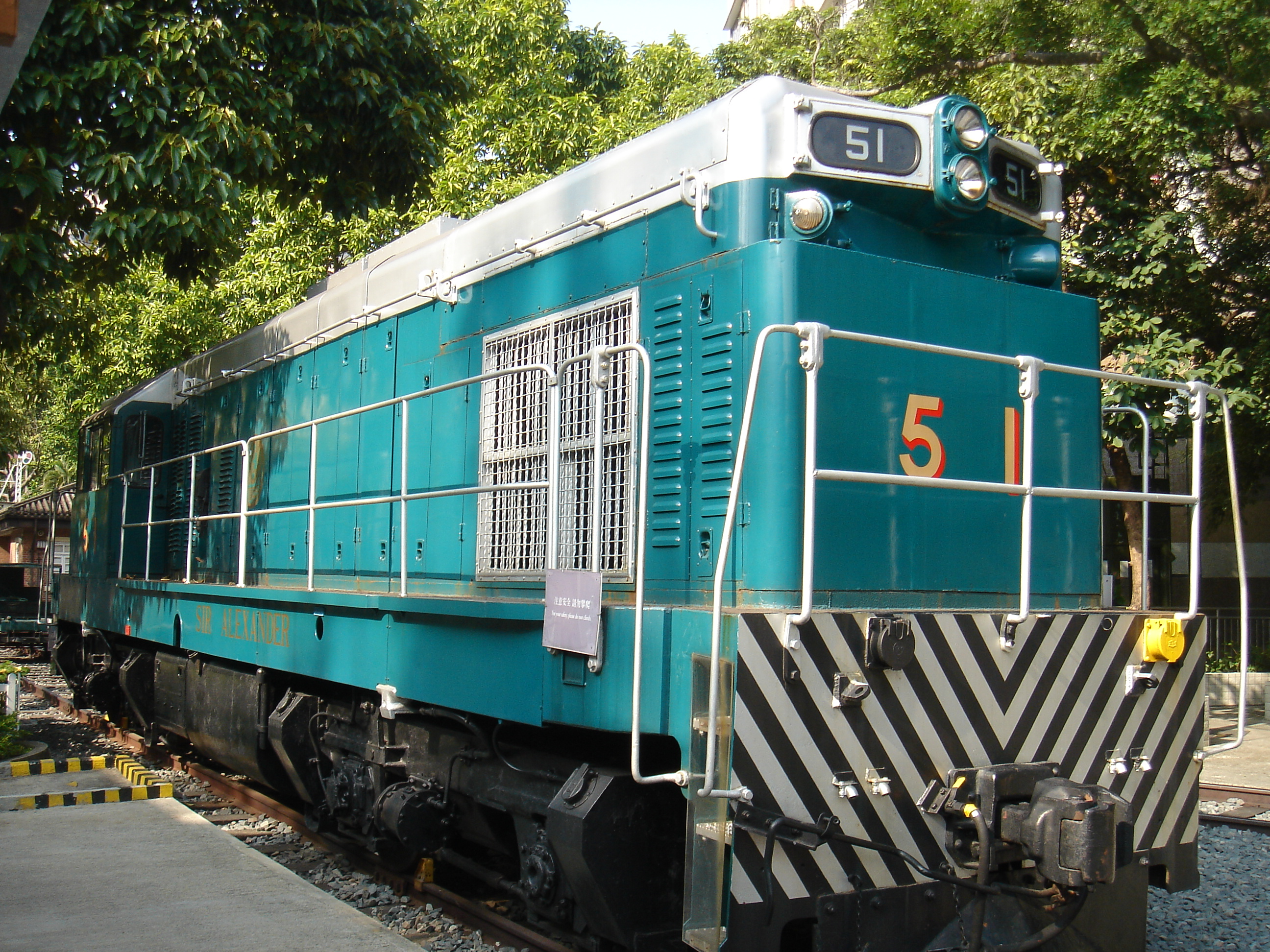
Hong Kong Railway Museum

=== India ===
- Coochbehar Railway Museum. Coochbehar, West Bengal
- Ghum Railway Museum, Ghum, West Bengal
- Heritage Rail Museum, Bhusawal
- Rewari Railway Heritage Museum, Rewari, Haryana
- Joshi's Museum of Miniature Railway, Pune, Maharashtra
- Kanpur Sangrahalaya, Kanpur, Uttar Pradesh
- Gorakhpur Rail Museum, Gorakhpur, Uttar Pradesh,
- Rail Museum, Howrah, Kolkata, West Bengal
- Mysore Rail Museum, Mysore, Karnataka
- Railway Museum, Hubli Junction railway station, Hubballi, Karnataka
- National Rail Museum, New Delhi
- Patel Chowk Metro Museum, Patel Chowk metro station, New Delhi
- Smaranika Tram Museum, Esplanade, West Bengal
- Railway Heritage Centre, Tiruchirappalli, Tamil Nadu
- Regional Railway Museum, Chennai, Tamil Nadu

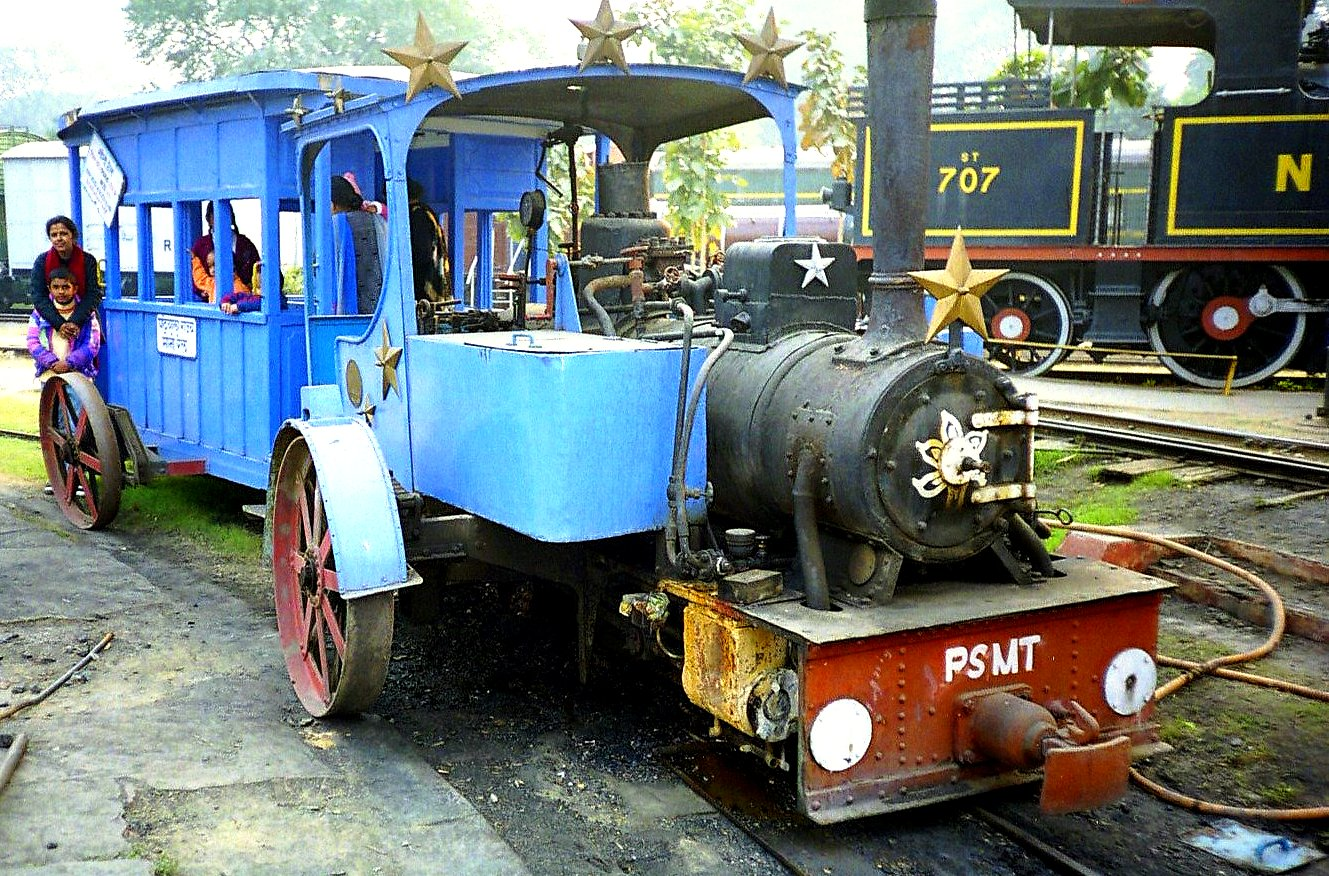
Patiala State Monorail System train at National Rail Museum, New Delhi, India

=== Indonesia ===
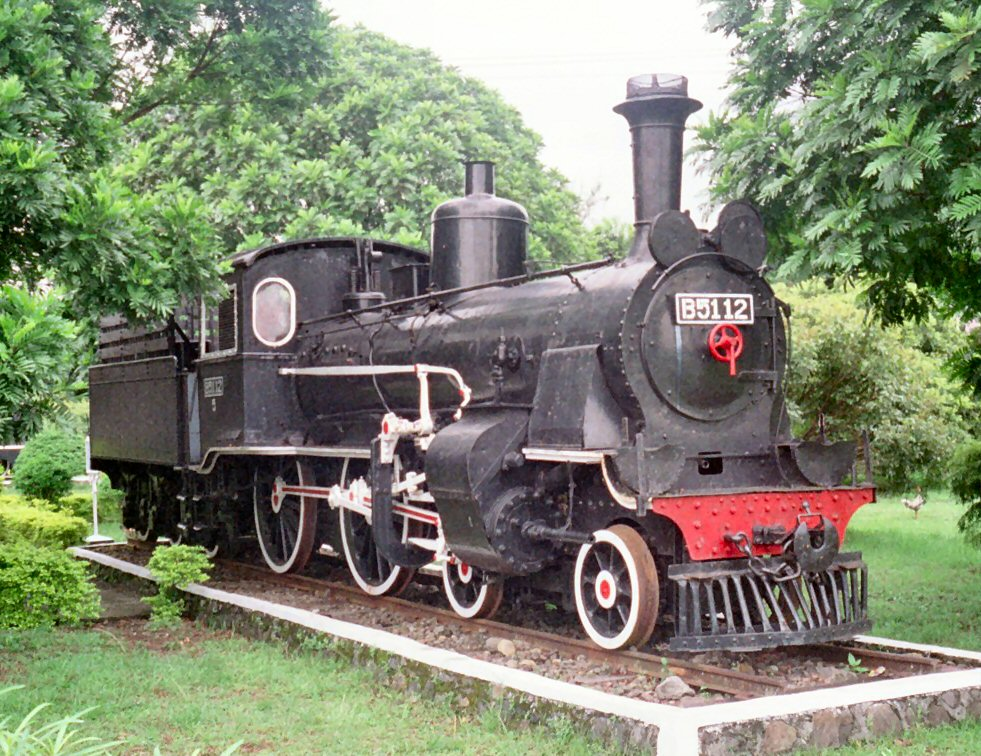
Steam Locomotive B-5112 in Ambarawa Railway Museum - Indonesia

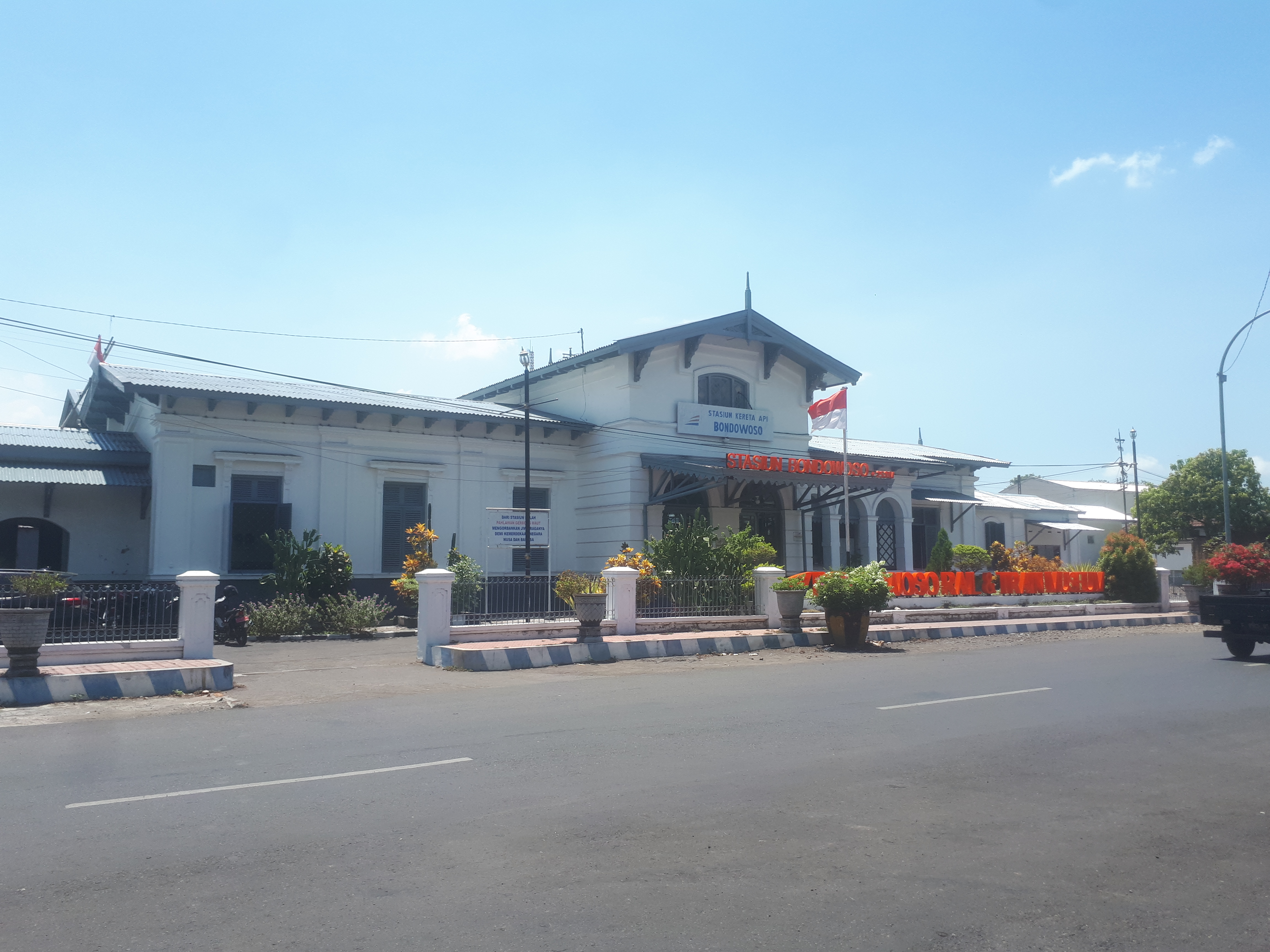
Front view of Bondowoso Rail and Train Museum, built by State Railway Company of the Dutch East Indies

- Indonesian Railway Museum of Ambarawa, Central Java
- Bondowoso Rail and Train Museum, Bondowoso Regency, East Java
- Museum of Transport of Taman Mini Indonesia Indah, Jakarta
- Sawahlunto Rail and Train Museum, Sawahlunto, West Sumatra

=== Israel ===
- Turkish Railway Station, Beersheba (South)
- Historic Railway Station, Afula (North)
- Israel Railway Museum, Haifa (National and North)
- Jaffa Railway Station, Tel Aviv (Center)
- Kfar Yehoshua Railway Station (North)

=== Japan ===
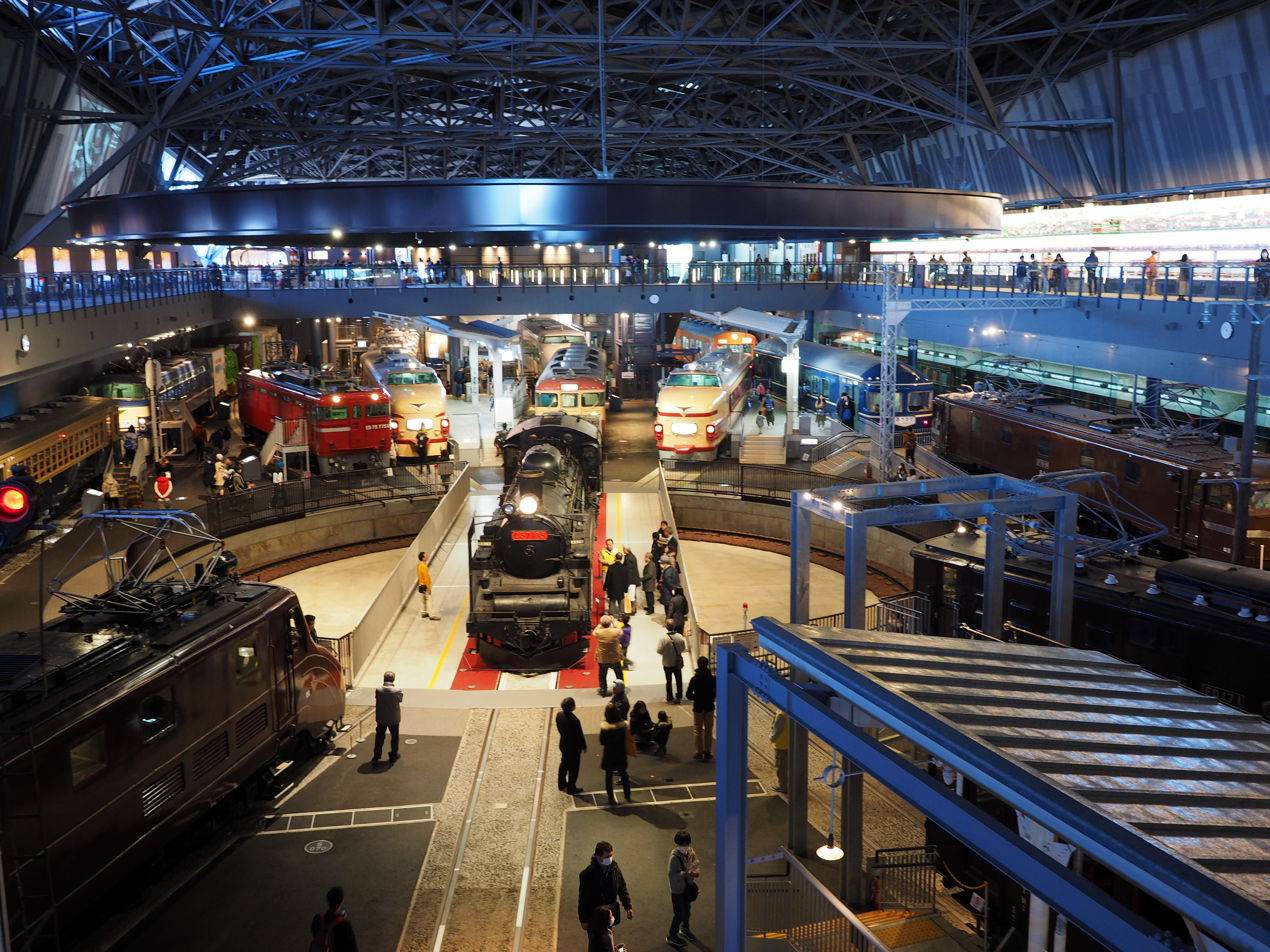
The Railway Museum, Saitama, Japan

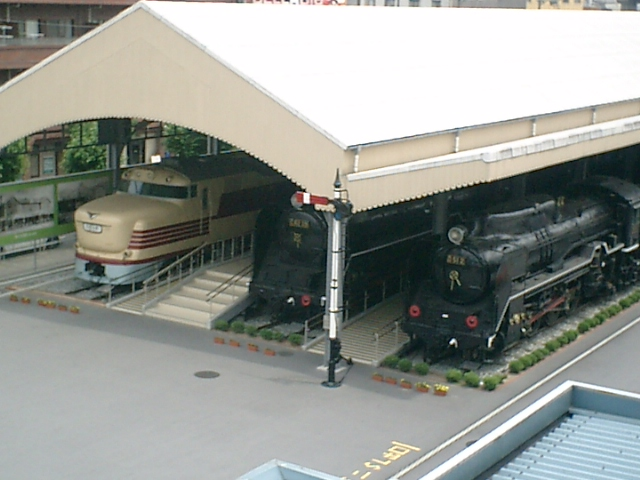
Modern Transportation Museum(Closed), Osaka

- Katakami Heritage Railway, in Misaki, Okayama
- Keio Rail-Land, in Hino, Tokyo
- Kyoto Railway Museum, in Shimogyō-ku, Kyoto
- Kyushu Railway History Museum, in Kitakyushu, Fukuoka
- Ome Railway Park, in Ome, Tokyo
- Otaru City General Museum, in Otaru, Hokkaido
- Railway Museum in Saitama, Saitama
- Romancecar Museum in Ebina, Kanagawa
- SCMaglev and Railway Park in Nagoya
- Shikoku Railway Cultural Center, in Saijō, Ehime
- Subway Museum, in Edogawa, Tokyo
- Tobu Museum, in Sumida, Tokyo
- Tsuyama Railroad Educational Museum, in Tsuyama, Okayama
- Train and Bus Museum, in Kawasaki, Kanagawa
- Usui Pass Railway Heritage Park, in Annaka, Gunma
- Yamanashi Prefectural Maglev Exhibition Center, Tsuru, Yamanashi
- Yokohama Tram Museum, in Yokohama, Kanagawa

==== Closed museums ====
- Modern Transportation Museum next to Bentencho Station, Minato-ku, Osaka (closed 2014)
- Sakuma Rail Park, in Hamamatsu, Shizuoka (closed 2009)

=== Jordan ===
- Hedjaz Jordan Railway Museum, Amman

=== Malaysia ===
- Gemas Railway Museum, Negeri Sembilan
- KTMB Museum, Johor
- Kuala Lumpur Railway Station
- North Borneo Railway, Sabah

=== Mongolia ===
- Mongolian Railway History Museum

=== North Korea ===
- Pyongyang Railway Museum

=== Pakistan ===
- Pakistan Railways Heritage Museum

=== Saudi Arabia ===
- Hejaz Railway Museum

=== Singapore ===
- Singapore Railways Museum
- Rail Corridor
- Bukit Timah Railway Station
- Tanjung Pagar Railway Station

=== South Korea ===
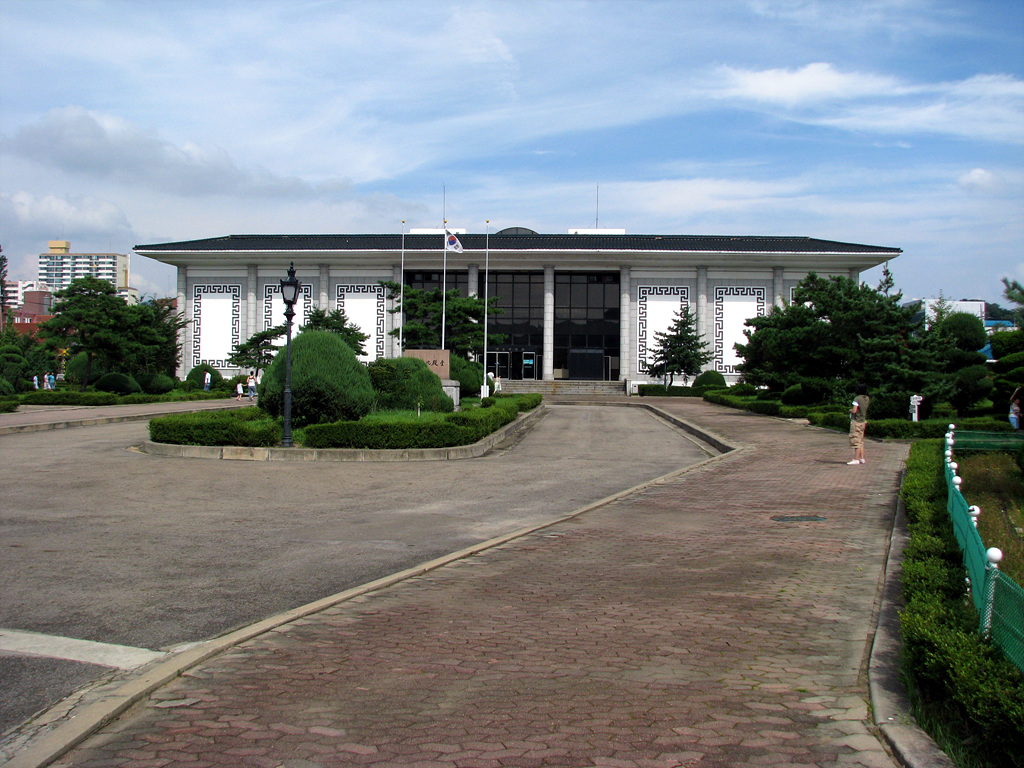
Korea Railroad Museum, near Uiwang Station

- Korea Railroad Museum
- Sumjingang Railroad Village in Gokseung County

=== Sri Lanka ===
- National railway museum, Kadugannawa

=== Taiwan ===
- Changhua Roundhouse in Changhua
- Hamasen Museum of Taiwan Railway in Kaohsiung
- Miaoli Railway Museum in Miaoli
- National Railway Museum in Taipei (by reservation or events, major opening in 2024)
- Taiwan High Speed Rail Museum in Zhongli, Taoyuan
- Takao Railway Museum in Kaohsiung
- Railway Department Park Branch, National Taiwan Museum in Taipei

=== Thailand ===
- Railway Outdoor Museum, Bangkok
- Thailand-Burma Railway Centre, Kanchanaburi
- Train Cemetery, Bangkok

=== Turkey ===
- Atatürk's Residence and Railway Museum, Ankara
- Çamlık Railway Museum, Selçuk, İzmir Province
- Istanbul Railway Museum, Istanbul
- İzmir Railway Museum, İzmir
- Rahmi M. Koç Museum, Istanbul
- TCDD Open Air Steam Locomotive Museum, Ankara

=== Uzbekistan ===
- Railway Museum

=== Vietnam ===
- Heritage Railway, Da Lat Railway Station

== Europe ==
=== Austria ===
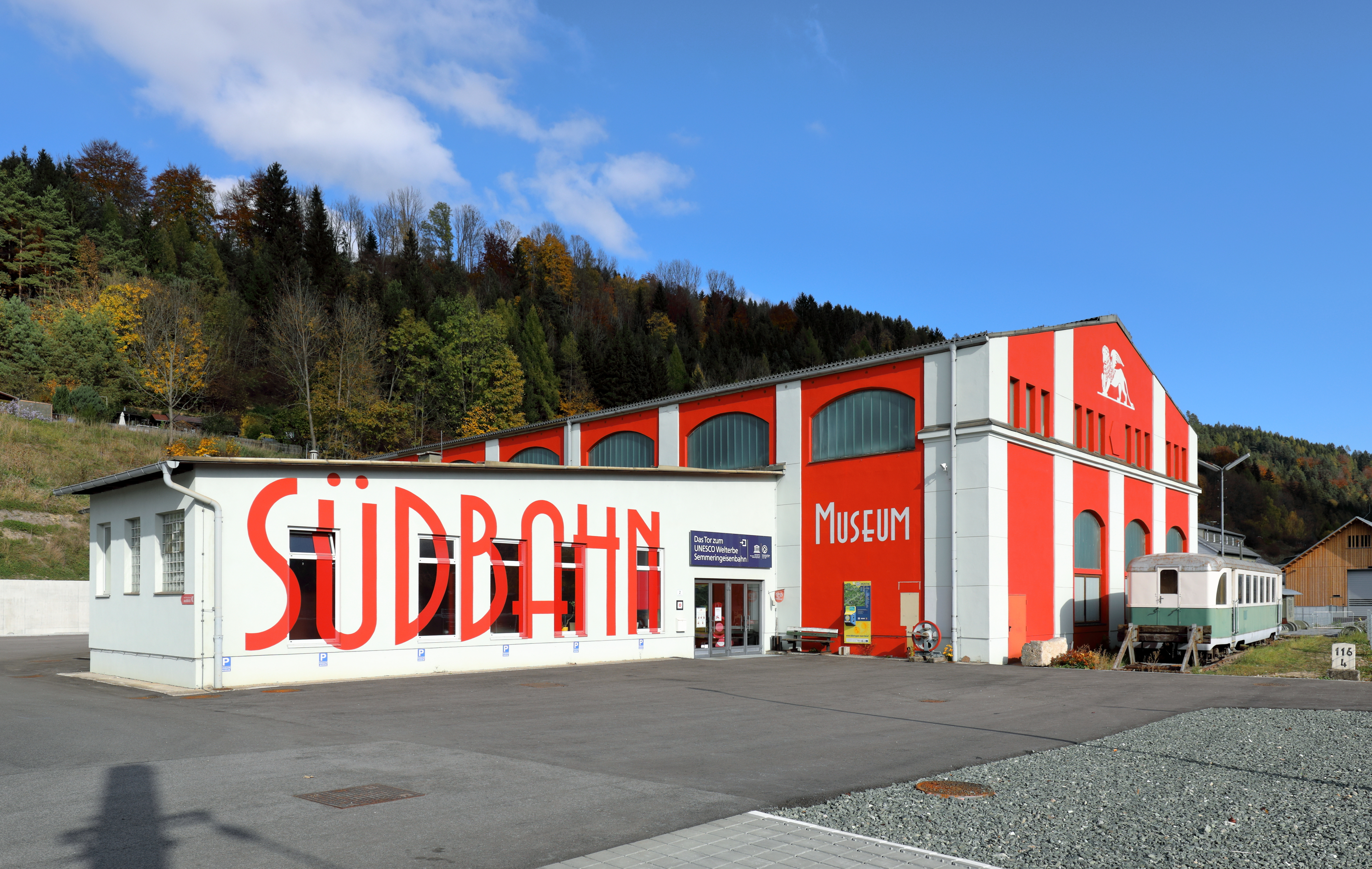
Southern Railway Museum Mürzzuschlag, Styria

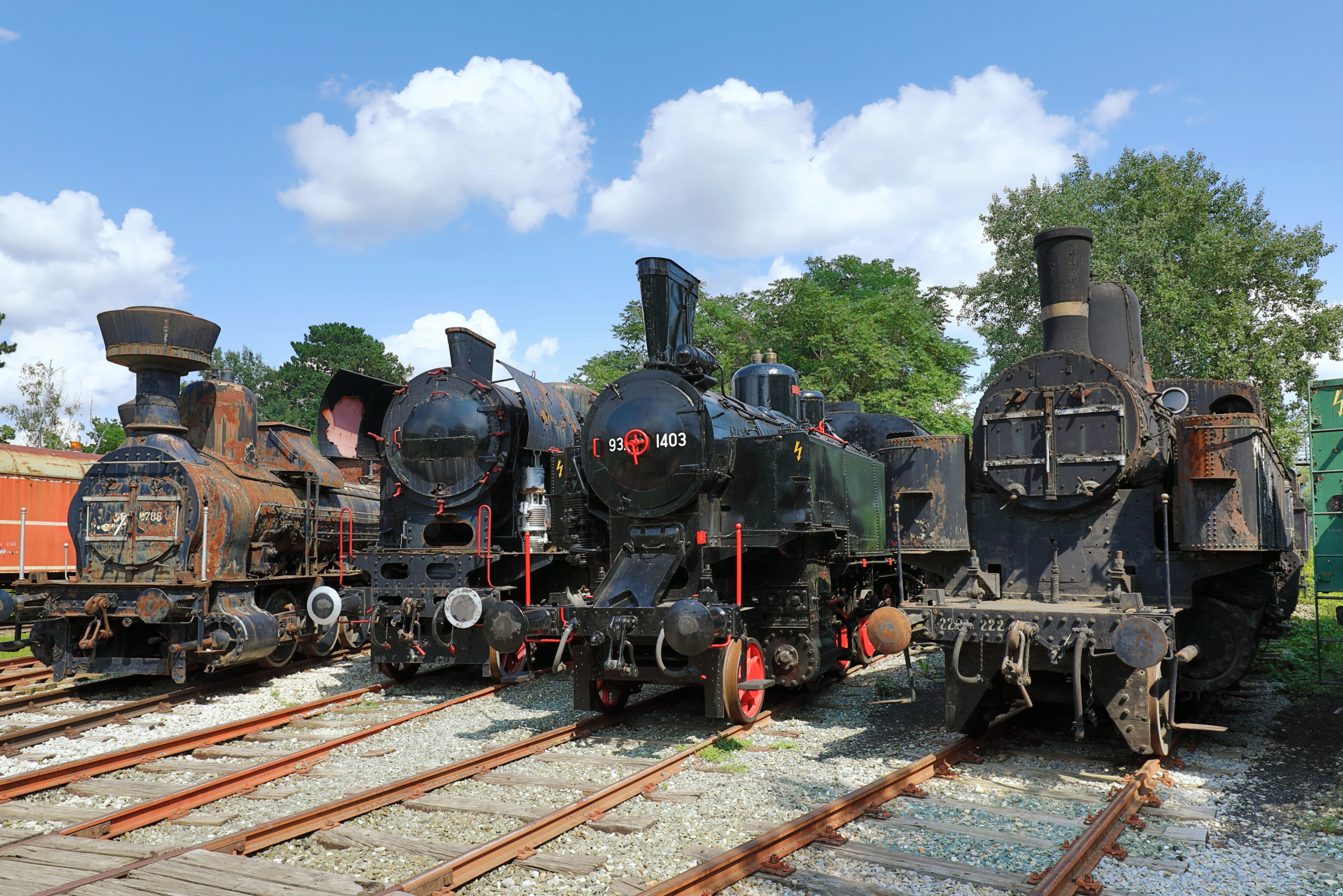
Strasshof Railway Museum, Lower Austria

- Austrian Railway Museum at Vienna
- Railway and Mining Museum Ampflwang in Upper Austria
- Railway Museum Sigmundsherberg in Lower Austria
- Southern Railway Museum in Mürzzuschlag
- Strasshof Railway Museum in Lower Austria

=== Belarus ===
- Baranovichy Railway Museum
- Brest Railway Museum

=== Belgium ===
- Chemin de Fer à vapeur des Trois Vallées
- Dendermonde–Puurs Steam Railway
- Patrimoine Ferroviaire et Tourisme
- Stoomcentrum Maldegem
- Train World

=== Bulgaria ===
- National Transport Museum, Bulgaria

=== Czech Republic ===
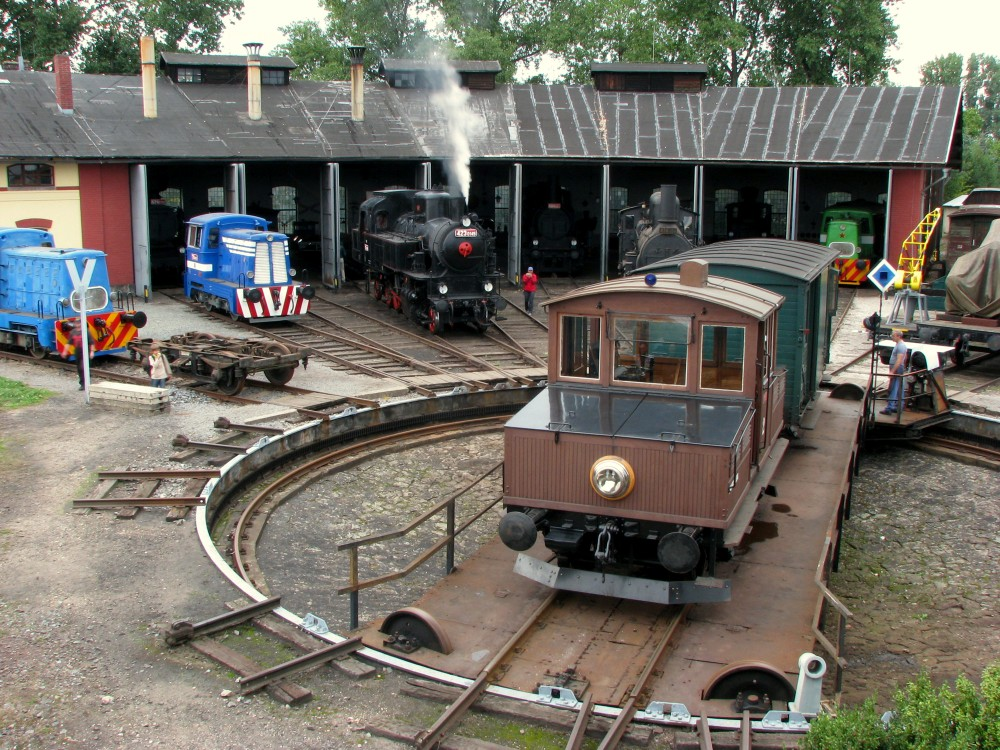
Railway Museum Jaroměř

- České dráhy Museum in Lužná
- National Technical Museum in Prague
- Railway Museum KHKD in Kněževes
- Railway Museum Jaroměř in Jaroměř (Železniční muzeum výtopna Jaroměř)
- Muzeum ozubnicové dráhy in Kořenov

=== Croatia ===
- Croatian Railway Museum, Zagreb, Croatia
- Coal loading facility and locomotive roundhouse in Karlovac, Croatia
- Locomotive roundhouse Rijeka, Croatia

=== Denmark ===
- Bornholm Narrow Gauge Railway Museum
- Danish Railway Museum
- Djursland Railway Museum
- Skjoldenæsholm Tram Museum
- Struer Railway Museum

=== Estonia ===
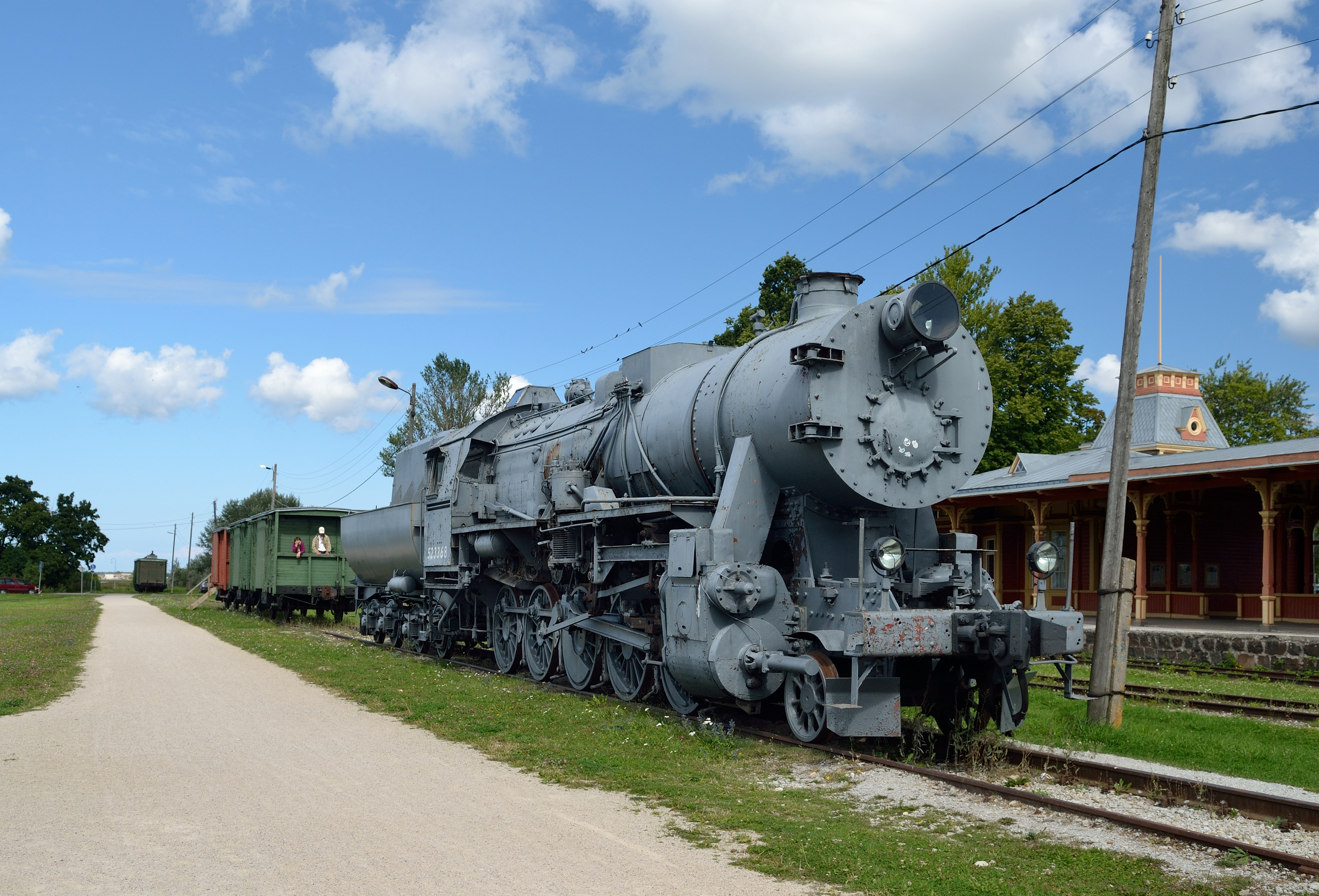
Estonian Railway Museum

- Estonian Railway Museum

=== Finland ===
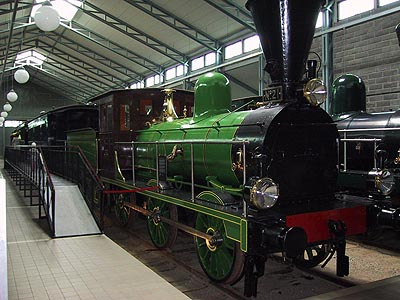
Finnish Railway Museum

- Finnish Railway Museum
- Jokioinen Museum Railway
- Savo Railway Museum

=== France ===
- Cité du Train
- Musée des tramways à vapeur et des chemins de fer secondaires français

=== Germany ===
- Augsburg Railway Park, Augsburg, Bavaria
- Bahnbetriebswerk Hermeskeil, Hermeskeil, Rhineland-Palatinate
- Bavarian Localbahn Society, Bayerisch Eisenstein, Bavaria
- Bavarian Railway Museum, Nördlingen, Bavaria
- Bochum Dahlhausen Railway Museum, Bochum, North Rhine-Westphalia
- Dampfbahn Fränkische Schweiz, Ebermannstadt, Bavaria
- Darmstadt-Kranichstein Railway Museum, Darmstadt-Kranichstein, Hesse
- DB Museum, Nuremberg, Bavaria
- DBK Historic Railway, Crailsheim, Baden-Württemberg
- Deutscher Eisenbahn-Verein, Bruchhausen-Vilsen, Lower Saxony
- Deutsches Museum, Munich, Bavaria
- Dieringhausen Railway Museum, Dieringhausen, North Rhine-Westphalia
- Dresden Transport Museum, Dresden, Saxony
- Eisenbahnfreunde Zollernbahn, Rottweil, Baden-Württemberg
- Franconian Museum Railway, Nuremberg, Bavaria
- Frankfurt City Junction Line, Frankfurt, Hesse
- Freilassing Locomotive World, Freilassing, Bavaria
- German Museum of Technology (Berlin)
- German Steam Locomotive Museum, Neuenmarkt-Wirsberg, Bavaria
- Hannoversches Straßenbahn-Museum, Hanover, Lower Saxony
- Historic Railway, Frankfurt, Frankfurt, Hesse
- Mellrichstadt-Fladungen railway, Fladungen, Bavaria
- Munich Steam Locomotive Company, Munich, Bavaria
- Neustadt/Weinstraße Railway Museum, Neustadt an der Weinstrasse, Rhineland-Palatinate
- Nuremberg Transport Museum, Nuremberg, Bavaria
- Railway Vehicle Preservation Society, Stuttgart, Baden-Württemberg
- Rügen Railway & Technology Museum, Prora, Mecklenburg-Western Pomerania
- Saxon Railway Museum, Chemnitz, Saxony
- Selfkantbahn, Gangelt, North Rhine-Westphalia
- Sinsheim Auto & Technik Museum, Sinsheim, Baden-Württemberg
- South German Railway Museum, Heilbronn, Baden-Württemberg
- Stuttgart Straßenbahn Museum Zuffenhausen, Stuttgart, Baden-Württemberg
- Technik Museum Speyer, Speyer, Rhineland Palatinate
- Traditionsbetriebswerk Staßfurt, Stassfurt, Saxony-Anhalt
- Ulmer Eisenbahnfreunde, Ulm, Baden-Württemberg

=== Greece ===
- Railway Museum of Athens
- Railway Museum of Thessaloniki

=== Hungary ===
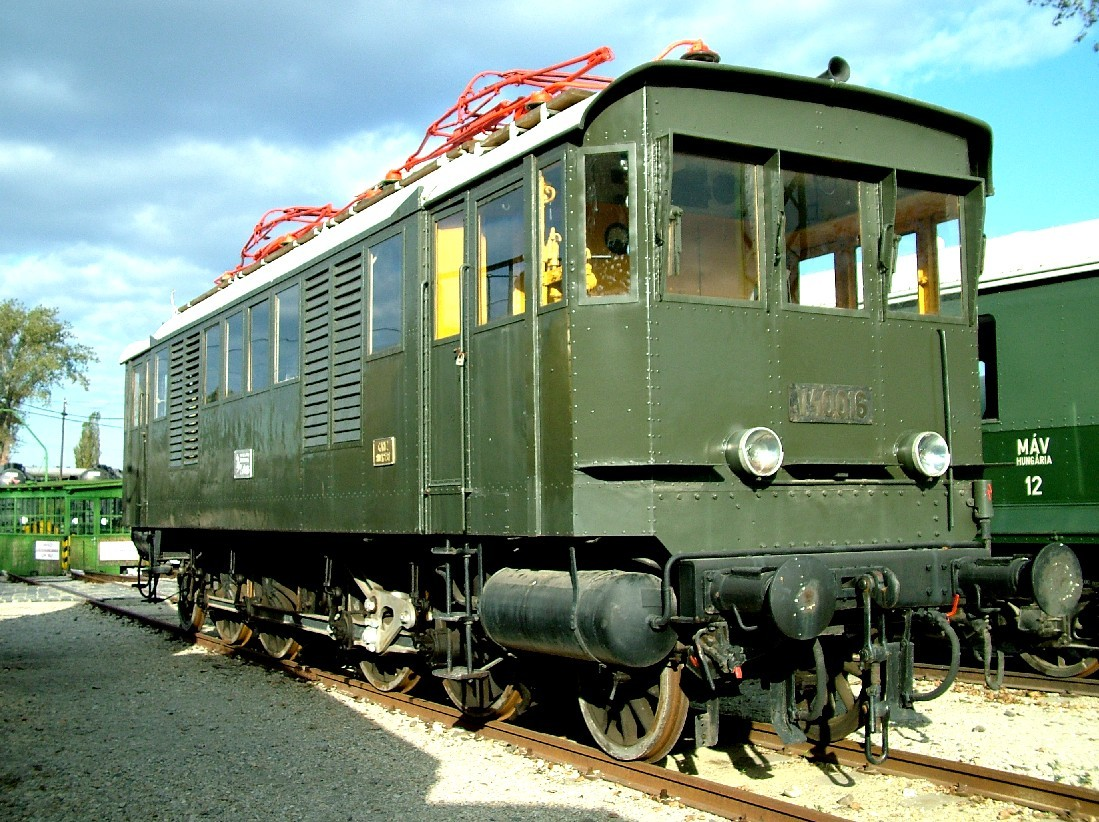
Hungarian Railway Museum

- Hungarian Railway Museum
- Millennium Underground Museum, Budapest
- Széchenyi Railway Museum
- Transport Museum of Budapest

=== Ireland ===
- Castlerea Railway Museum
- Cavan and Leitrim Railway
- Donegal Railway Heritage Centre
- Railway Preservation Society of Ireland

=== Italy ===
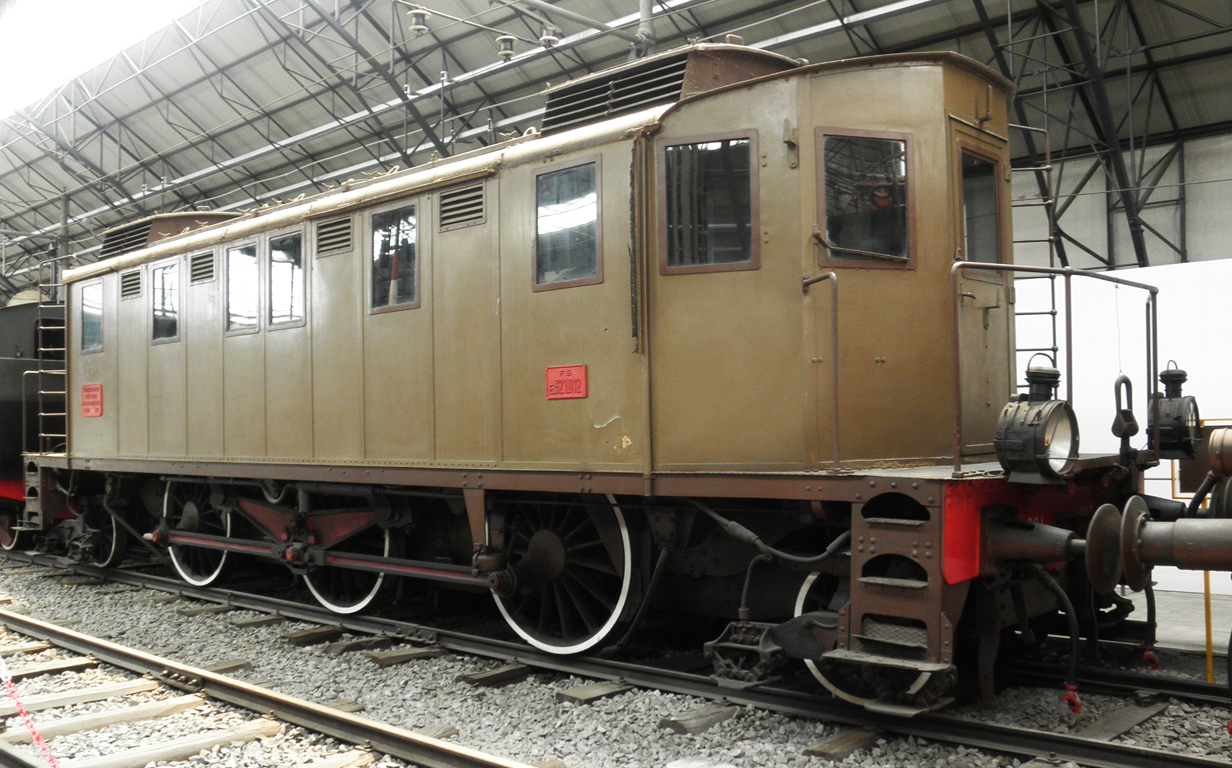
Museo Nazionale della Scienza e della Tecnologia, Milan

- Costituendo Musero Ferroviario di Primolano, Primolano, Vicenza
- Museo delle Industrie e del Lavoro del Saronnese, Saronno, Varese
- Museo Europeo dei Trasporti Ogliari, Ranco, Varese
- Museo Ferroviario di Trieste Campo Marzio, Trieste
- Museo Ferroviario Piemontese, Savigliano, Turin
- Museo Nazionale dei Trasporti, La Spezia
- Museo Nazionale Ferroviario di Pietrarsa, Naples
- Museo Nazionale Scienza e Tecnologia Leonardo da Vinci, Milan
- Museo Ferroviario della Puglia, Lecce

=== Latvia ===
- Latvian Railway History Museum

=== Lithuania ===
- Railway Museum, Vilnius and Šiauliai *Home | Geležinkelių muziejus (ltgmuziejus.lt)
- Aukštaitija Narrow Gauge Railway, Panevėžys and Anykščia *Aukštaitijos siaurasis geležinkelis - Siaurukas

=== Luxembourg ===
- Train 1900

=== Netherlands ===
- Noord-Nederlands Trein & Tram Museum
- het Spoorwegmuseum
- Stoom Stichting Nederland
- Stoomtrein Goes - Borsele
- Museumstoomtram Hoorn-Medemblik
- Stoomtrein Valkenburgse Meer
- Veluwsche Stoomtrein Maatschappij
- Zuid-Limburgse Stoomtrein Maatschappij
- Stichting Stadskanaal Rail
- Museum Buurtspoorweg

=== Norway ===
- Norwegian Railway Museum, Hamar
- Oslo Tramway Museum, Oslo
- Trondheim Tramway Museum

=== Poland ===
- Sochaczew Narrow Gauge Railway Museum
- Wenecja Narrow Gauge Railway Museum
- Railway Museum in Chabówka village, near Rabka, Nowy Targ County
- Kościerzyna Railway Museum, Pomeranian Voivodeship
- Roundhouse Skierniewice in Skierniewice
- Silesian Railway Museum (Muzeum Kolejnictwa na Śląsku), Lower Silesian Voivodeship
- Warsaw Railway Museum (Muzeum Kolejnictwa w Warszawie), Masovian Voivodeship
- Wolsztyn Steam Locomotive Roundhouse, the only depot in Europe with everyday scheduled passenger trains driven by steam locomotives

=== Portugal ===
- National Railway Museum Foundation, Entroncamento

==== Museum Branches of FMNF ====
- Arco de Baúlhe
- Bragança
- Chaves
- Lousado
- Macinhata do Vouga
- Nine
- Santarém
- Valença

==== Disused or Closed Museums ====
- Braga
- Estremoz
- Lagos

==== Museological Warehouses ====
- Barreiro
- Estremoz
- Livração
- Pampilhosa
- Peso da Régua
- Pocinho
- Sernada do Vouga
- Tua

=== Romania ===
- Reșița Steam Locomotive Museum
- Sibiu Steam Locomotives Museum

=== Russia ===
- Museum for Railway Technology Novosibirsk at Seyatel station
- Museum of the Moscow Railway (Paveletskaya station), Moscow
- Rizhsky Rail Terminal, Moscow
- Russian Railway Museum, Saint Petersburg
- Railway museum at Nizhny Novgorod
- Railway museum at Pereslavl-Zalessky (narrow gauge)
- Railway museum at Rostov-on-Don
- Railway museum at Yekaterinburg

=== Serbia ===
- Narrow Gauge Museum in Pozega
- Railway Museum in Belgrade

=== Slovenia ===
- Slovenian Railway Museum
- Museum of Southern Railway in Šentjur, Slovenia
- Museum park Breda in Ilirska Bistrica, Slovenia

=== Spain ===
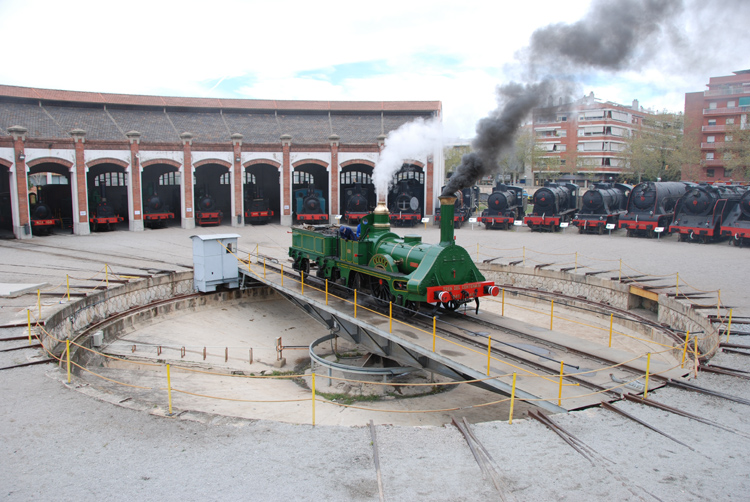
Catalan Railway Museum

- Basque Railway Museum
- Gijón Railway Museum (Museo del Ferrocarill de Asturias)
- Railway Centre and Museum in Móra la Nova (Centre d'Interpretació del Ferrocarril de Móra la Nova)
- Railway Museum in Ponferrada (Museo del Ferrocarril)
- Railway Museum in Madrid (Museo del Ferrocarril)
- Railway Museum in Monforte de Lemos (Museo del Ferrocarril de Galicia)
- Railway Museum in Vilanova (Museu del Ferrocarril de Vilanova)(Vilanova Railway Museum)
- Railway Museum in Son Carrió, Mallorca - Museo del Ferrocarril de Mallorca, since Nov. 2025

=== Sweden ===
- Åmål-Årjäng Railway Society, Åmål
- Anten-Gräfsnäs Narrow-Gauge Steam Railway, Lake Anten
- Dalara and Western Farmlands Railway, Åmål
- Eastern Götland Railway Museum, Linköping
- Eastern Southernlands Railway, Mariefred
- Gothenburg Nostalgia Tram, Gothenburg
- Gotland Railway Association, Dalhem
- Grängesberg Regional Railway Museum, Grängesberg
- Hagfors Railway Museum, Hagfors
- Järdaås Pine Forest Railway, Jädraås
- Kristiantown Regional Museum, Kristianstad
- Landeryd's Railway Museum, Landeryd
- Nässjö Railway Museum (in Swedish), Nässjö
- Nora Mining District Historical Railway, Nora
- Northbottom's Railway Museum, Luleå
- Nynäshamn's Railway Museum, Nynäshamn
- Railway Museum of Ängelholm, Ängelholm
- Skara-Lundsbrunn Railways, Skara
- Stockholm Streetcar Museum, Stockholm
- Swedish National Railway Museum, Gävle
- Upsala-Lenna Jernväg, Uppsala

=== Switzerland ===
- Blonay–Chamby Museum Railway

=== Ukraine ===
- Kiev Railway Museum
- Museum of History and Development of Donetsk Railway in Donetsk
- Museum of History and Technology of Southern Railway in Kharkiv
- Lviv Railway History Museum in Lviv
- Locomotive-museum in the city of Pomichna

=== United Kingdom and Crown dependencies ===
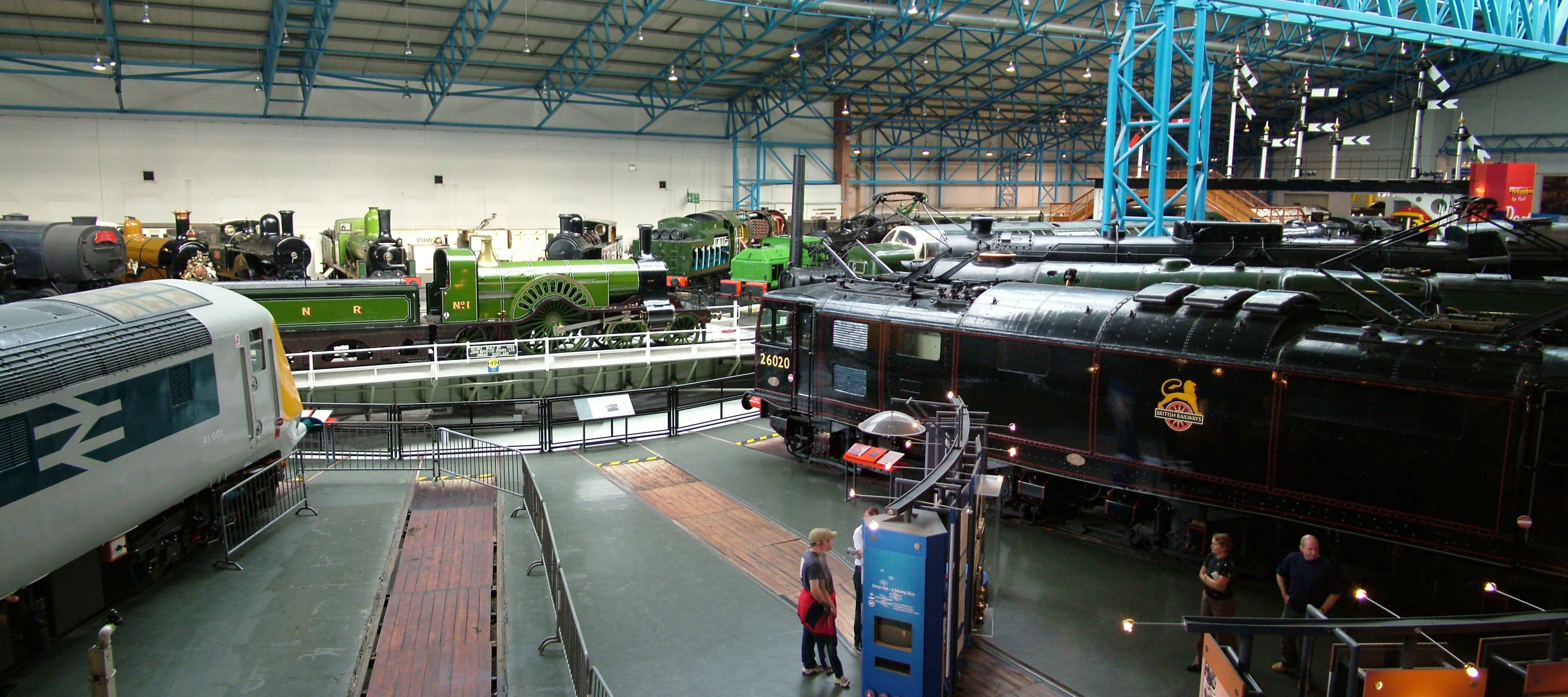
Locomotives arranged around the turntable in the Great Hall of the National Railway Museum

Museum	Location	Country
Amberley Working Museum	Amberley	England
Anson Engine Museum	Poynton	England
Astley Green Colliery Museum	Astley	England
Barrow Hill Engine Shed	Barrow Hill	England
Beamish Museum	Beamish	England
Bressingham Steam & Gardens	Bressingham	England
Bristol Harbour Railway and Industrial Museum	Bristol	England
Conwy Valley Railway Museum	Betws-y-Coed	Wales
Crewe Heritage Centre	Crewe	England
Darlington Railway Centre and Museum	Darlington	England
Didcot Railway Centre	Didcot	England
Hopetown Carriage Works	Darlington	England
Jurby Transport Museum	Jurby	Isle of Man
Mangapps Railway Museum	Burnham-on-Crouch	England
Monkwearmouth Station Museum	Monkwearmouth	England
Museum of Scottish Railways	Bo'ness	Scotland
Narrow Gauge Railway Museum	Tywyn	Wales
National Railway Museum	York	England
North Woolwich Old Station Museum	North Woolwich	England
Nottingham Heritage Railway	Ruddington	England
Pendon Museum	Long Wittenham	England
Penrhyn Castle Railway Museum	Bangor	Wales
Port Erin Railway Museum	Port Erin	Isle of Man
Railway Preservation Society of Ireland	Whitehead	Northern Ireland
Riverside Museum	Glasgow	Scotland
Rushden Station Railway Museum	Rushden	England
Shildon Locomotion Museum	Shildon	England
Stephenson Railway Museum	North Tyneside	England
Summerlee Museum of Scottish Industrial Life	Coatbridge	Scotland
Swindon Steam Railway Museum	Swindon	England
Ulster Folk and Transport Museum	Cultra	Northern Ireland
Walthamstow Pump House Museum	London	England

== North America ==
=== Canada ===
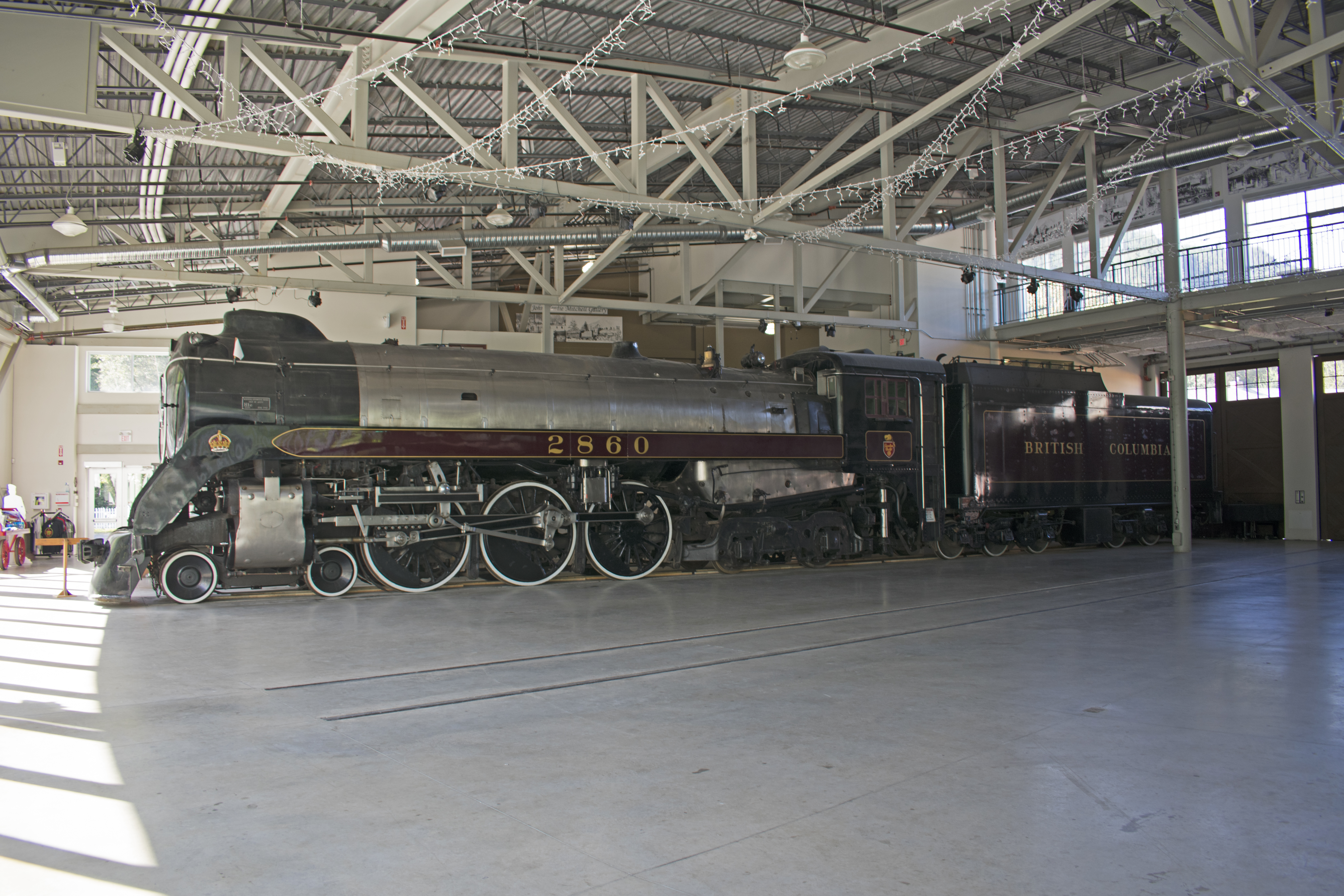
Canadian Pacific No. 2860 inside the roundhouse at the Railway Museum of British Columbia.

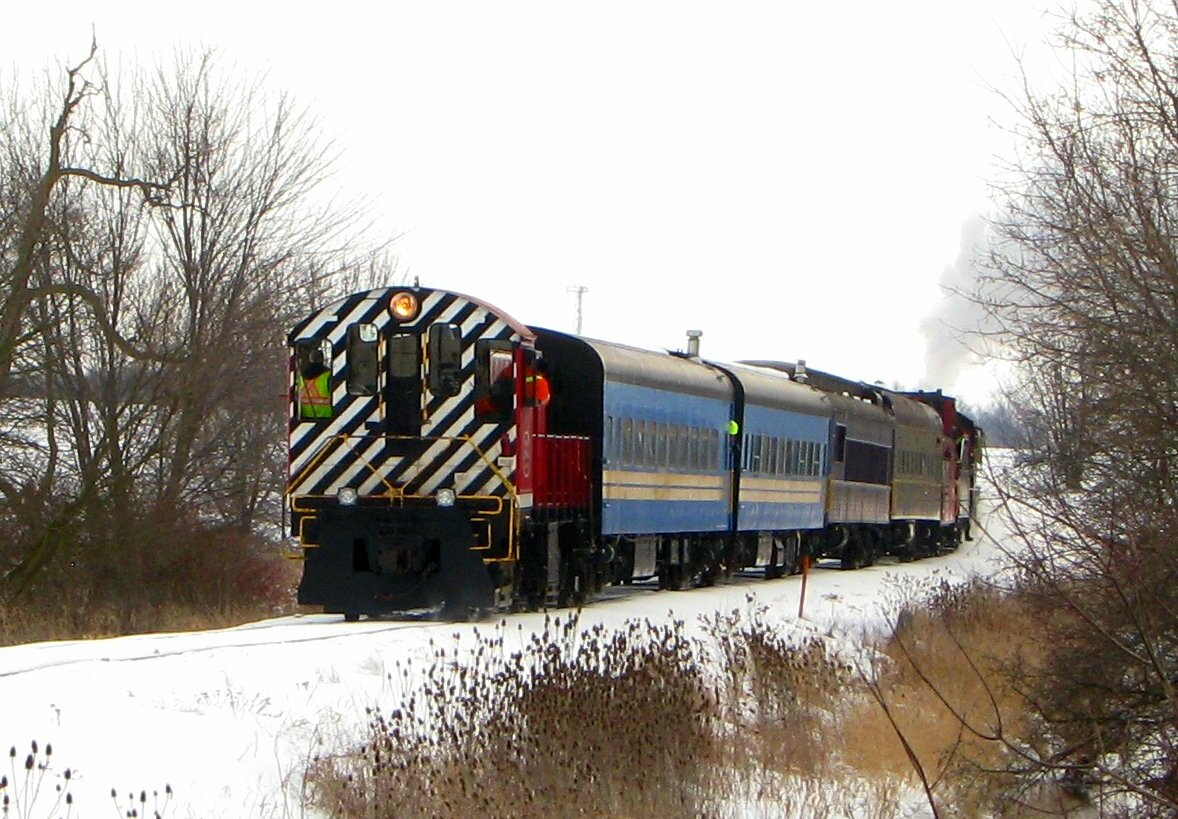
Canadian Pacific No. 6593 moving various passenger cars at the Waterloo Central Railway.

Museum	City	Province
Alberta Central Railway Museum	Wetaskiwin	Alberta
Alberta Prairie Railway	Stettler	Alberta
Alberta Railway Museum	Edmonton	Alberta
Canadian Museum of Rail Travel	Cranbrook	British Columbia
Canadian Railway Museum	Saint-Constant	Quebec
Champion Park	Okotoks	Alberta
Edmonton Radial Railway Society	Edmonton	Alberta
Elgin County Railway Museum	St. Thomas	Ontario
Halton County Radial Railway	Milton	Ontario
John Street Roundhouse	Toronto	Ontario
Middleton Railway Museum	Middleton	Nova Scotia
New Brunswick Railway Museum	Hillsborough	New Brunswick
Northern Ontario Railroad Museum	Greater Sudbury	Ontario
Nova Scotia Museum of Industry	Stellarton	Nova Scotia
PoMo Museum	Port Moody	British Columbia
Railway Coastal Museum	St. John's	Newfoundland and Labrador
Railway Museum of Eastern Ontario	Smiths Falls	Ontario
Revelstoke Railway Museum	Revelstoke	British Columbia
Saskatchewan Railway Museum	Saskatoon	Saskatchewan
Toronto Railway Museum	Toronto	Ontario
Railway Museum of British Columbia	Squamish	British Columbia
Winnipeg Railway Museum	Winnipeg	Manitoba

=== Guatemala ===
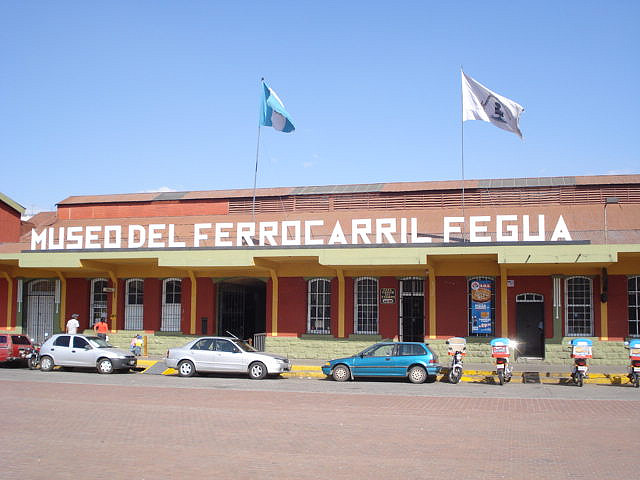
Guatemala City railway museum

- Guatemala City Railway Museum
- Railway Museum Los Altos in Quetzaltenango

=== Honduras ===
- El Progreso railway museum,Yoro

=== Mexico ===
- Old Railway Station and Railway Museum
- Mexican Railways National Museum
- Railwaymen Museum
- Queretaro Station Museum and Cultural Center
- Contreras Station Museum
- Vivencial Ferrocarril 279
- Torreon Station Museum

=== United States ===
Museum	City	State
Heart of Dixie Railroad Museum	Calera	Alabama
North Alabama Railroad Museum	Huntsville	Alabama
Arizona Railway Museum	Chandler	Arizona
Arizona State Railroad Museum	Williams	Arizona
Phoenix Trolley Museum	Phoenix	Arizona
Southern Arizona Transportation Museum	Tucson	Arizona
Arkansas Railroad Museum	Pine Bluff	Arkansas
California State Railroad Museum	Sacramento	California
Fullerton Train Museum	Fullerton	California
Golden Gate Railroad Museum	Sunol	California
Laws Railroad Museum and Historic Site	Laws	California
Lomita Railroad Museum	Lomita	California
Nevada County Narrow Gauge Railroad & Transportation Museum	Nevada City	California
Niles Canyon Railway	Fremont	California
Pacific Southwest Railway Museum	Campo	California
RailGiants Train Museum	Pomona	California
Railtown 1897 State Historic Park	Jamestown	California
San Diego Electric Railway Association	National City	California
San Diego Model Railroad Museum	San Diego	California
San Francisco Cable Car Museum	San Francisco	California
San Francisco Railway Museum	San Francisco	California
Society for the Preservation of Carter Railroad Resources	Fremont	California
South Coast Railroad Museum	Goleta	California
Southern California Railway Museum	Perris	California
Tehachapi Railroad Depot	Tehachapi	California
Travel Town Museum	Los Angeles	California
Western America Railroad Museum	Barstow	California
Western Pacific Railroad Museum	Portola	California
Western Railway Museum	Rio Vista	California
Colorado Railroad Museum	Golden	Colorado
Connecticut Trolley Museum	East Windsor	Connecticut
Danbury Railway Museum	Danbury	Connecticut
Railroad Museum of New England	Thomaston	Connecticut
Shore Line Trolley Museum	East Haven	Connecticut
Florida Railroad Museum	Parrish	Florida
Gold Coast Railroad Museum	Miami	Florida
Railroad Museum of South Florida	Fort Myers	Florida
West Florida Railroad Museum	Milton	Florida
Georgia State Railroad Museum	Savannah	Georgia
Southeastern Railway Museum	Duluth	Georgia
Southern Museum of Civil War and Locomotive History	Kennesaw	Georgia
Hawaiian Railway Society	Ewa	Hawaii
Avery Museum	Avery	Idaho
Wallace Depot Museum	Wallace	Idaho
Fox River Trolley Museum	South Elgin	Illinois
Galesburg Railroad Museum	Galesburg	Illinois
Illinois Railway Museum	Union	Illinois
Monticello Railway Museum	Monticello	Illinois
Hesston Steam Museum	Hesston	Indiana
Hoosier Valley Railroad Museum	North Judson	Indiana
National New York Central Railroad Museum	Elkhart	Indiana
Boone & Scenic Valley Railroad & Museum	Boone	Iowa
Sioux City Railroad Museum	Sioux City	Iowa
Great Plains Transportation Museum	Wichita	Kansas
Bluegrass Railroad and Museum	Versailles	Kentucky
Elkhorn City Railroad Museum	Elkhorn	Kentucky
Historic Railpark and Train Museum	Bowling Green	Kentucky
Kentucky Railway Museum	New Haven	Kentucky
Kentucky Steam Heritage Corporation	Irvine	Kentucky
Railway Museum of Greater Cincinnati	Covington	Kentucky
Boothbay Railway Village	Boothbay	Maine
Maine Narrow Gauge Railroad Museum	Portland	Maine
Sandy River and Rangeley Lakes Railroad	Phillips	Maine
Seashore Trolley Museum	Kennebunkport	Maine
Wiscasset, Waterville and Farmington Railway	Alna	Maine
Baltimore Streetcar Museum	Baltimore	Maryland
B&O Railroad Museum	Baltimore	Maryland
Ellicott City B&O Station & Museum	Ellicott City	Maryland
Irish Railroad Workers Museum	Baltimore	Maryland
National Capital Trolley Museum	Colesville	Maryland
Oakland B&O Railroad Museum	Oakland	Maryland
Queponco Railway Station	Newark	Maryland
La Plata Train Station Museum	La Plata	Maryland
Berkshire Scenic Railway Museum	Lenox	Massachusetts
Shelburne Falls Trolley Museum	Shelburne Falls	Massachusetts
Alden Depot Museum	Alden	Michigan
Boston-Saranac Historical Society	Saranac	Michigan
Buckley Old Engine Show	Buckley	Michigan
Capac Depot Museum	Capac	Michigan
Clinton Northern Railway Museum	St. Johns	Michigan
Crawford County Historical Museum	Grayling	Michigan
Durand Union Station	Durand	Michigan
Flushing Area Museum	Flushing	Michigan
Harrisville Depot Museum	Harrisville	Michigan
Henry Ford Museum	Dearborn	Michigan
Huckleberry Railroad	Flint	Michigan
Imlay City Museum	Imlay City	Michigan
Lincoln Depot Museum	Lincoln	Michigan
Lost Railway Museum	Grass Lake	Michigan
Michigan Transit Museum	Mt. Clemens	Michigan
Montcalm Community College Heritage Village	Sidney	Michigan
New Buffalo Railroad Museum	New Buffalo	Michigan
S.S. City of Milwaukee Museum	Manistee	Michigan
Saginaw Railway Museum	Saginaw	Michigan
Saline Area Historical Society	Saline	Michigan
Sanford Historical Museum	Sanford	Michigan
Shepherd Depot Museum	Shepherd	Michigan
Southern Michigan Railroad Society	Clinton	Michigan
Sparta Depot Museum	Sparta	Michigan
St. Charles Area Museum	St. Charles	Michigan
Standish Depot Museum	Standish	Michigan
Steam Railroading Institute	Owosso	Michigan
Thomas Edison Depot Museum	Port Huron	Michigan
Union Depot Museum	Vicksburg	Michigan
Waterford Historical Society	Waterford Twp	Michigan
Williamston Depot Museum	Williamston	Michigan
Witches Hat Depot Museum	South Lyon	Michigan
Lake Superior Railroad Museum	Duluth	Minnesota
Minnesota Streetcar Museum	Minneapolis	Minnesota
Minnesota Transportation Museum	Saint Paul	Minnesota
National Museum of Transportation	St. Louis	Missouri
Harlowton Depot Museum	Harlowton	Montana
Livingston Depot	Livingston	Montana
Nevada Northern Railway Museum	Ely	Nevada
Nevada State Railroad Museum	Carson City	Nevada
Black River & Western Railroad	Ringoes	New Jersey
Delaware River Railroad Excursions	Phillipsburg	New Jersey
Friar Mountain Model Railroad Museum	Sparta	New Jersey
Maywood Station Museum	Maywood	New Jersey
New Jersey Museum of Transportation	Wall	New Jersey
North Pemberton Railroad Station Museum	Pemberton	New Jersey
Northlandz	Flemington, New Jersey	New Jersey
Whippany Railway Museum	Whippany	New Jersey
Medina Railroad Museum	Medina	New York
New York Museum of Transportation	Rush	New York
New York Transit Museum	New York City	New York
Railroad Museum of Long Island	Long Island	New York
Rochester & Genesee Valley Railroad Museum	Rush	New York
Trolley Museum of New York	Kingston	New York
North Carolina Railroad Museum	Bonsal	North Carolina
North Carolina Transportation Museum	Spencer	North Carolina
Wilmington Railroad Museum	Wilmington	North Carolina
North Dakota State Railroad Museum	Mandan	North Dakota
Conneaut Historical Railroad Museum	Conneaut	Ohio
Mad River & NKP Railroad Museum	Bellevue	Ohio
Ohio Railway Museum	Worthington	Ohio
Oklahoma Railway Museum	Oklahoma City	Oklahoma
Railroad Museum of Oklahoma	Enid	Oklahoma
Mount Hood Railroad	Hood River	Oregon
Oregon Coast Scenic Railroad	Garibaldi	Oregon
Oregon Electric Railway Museum	Brooks	Oregon
Oregon Rail Heritage Center	Portland	Oregon
Colebrookdale Railroad	Boyertown	Pennsylvania
Electric City Trolley Museum	Scranton	Pennsylvania
Franklin Institute	Philadelphia	Pennsylvania
National Toy Train Museum	Strasburg	Pennsylvania
New Hope Railroad	New Hope	Pennsylvania
Pennsylvania Trolley Museum	Washington	Pennsylvania
Railroad Museum of Pennsylvania	Strasburg	Pennsylvania
Railroaders Memorial Museum	Altoona	Pennsylvania
Reading Railroad Heritage Museum	Hamburg	Pennsylvania
Rockhill Trolley Museum	Rockhill	Pennsylvania
Steamtown National Historic Site	Scranton	Pennsylvania
Western Pennsylvania Model Railroad Museum	Gibsonia	Pennsylvania
South Dakota State Railroad Museum	Hill City	South Dakota
Memphis Railroad & Trolley Museum	Memphis	Tennessee
Tennessee Central Railway Museum	Nashville	Tennessee
Tennessee Valley Railroad Museum	Chattanooga	Tennessee
Cleburne Railroad Museum	Cleburne	Texas
Galveston Railroad Museum	Galveston	Texas
Interurban Railway Museum	Plano	Texas
Museum of the American Railroad	Frisco	Texas
Railway Museum of San Angelo	San Angelo	Texas
Texas Transportation Museum	San Antonio	Texas
Cotton Belt Depot Museum	Tyler	Texas
Rosenberg Railroad Museum	Rosenberg	Texas
Texas State Railroad	Palestine	Texas
Wichita Falls Railroad Museum	Wichita Falls	Texas
Golden Spike National Historical Park	Promontory	Utah
Tie Fork Rest Area	Tucker	Utah
Tooele Valley Railroad Complex	Tooele	Utah
Utah State Railroad Museum	Ogden	Utah
Western Mining and Railroad Museum	Helper	Utah
Rappahannock Railroad Museum	Fredericksburg	Virginia
Richmond Railroad Museum	Richmond	Virginia
Virginia Museum of Transportation	Roanoke	Virginia
Lee Hall Depot	Newport News	Virginia
Boyce Railway Depot	Boyce	Virginia
C&O Railway Heritage Center	Clifton Forge	Virginia
Crewe Railroad Museum	Crewe	Virginia
Suffolk Seaboard Station Railway Museum	Suffolk	Virginia
Railroad Museum of Virginia	Portsmouth	Virginia
RF&P Park	Glen Allen	Virginia
Herndon Depot	Herndon	Virginia
Fairfax Station Railroad Museum	Fairfax Station	Virginia
Museum of Culpeper History	Culpeper	Virginia
Ashland Depot	Ashland	Virginia
Norge Depot	Norge	Virginia
Eastern Shore Railway Museum	Parksley	Virginia
Montpelier Depot	Montpelier Station	Virginia
Tazewell Train Station and Visitors Center	Tazewell	Virginia
Strasburg Museum	Strasburg	Virginia
Rural Retreat Depot	Rural Retreat	Virginia
Inland Northwest Rail Museum	Reardan	Washington
Northern Pacific Railway Museum	Toppenish	Washington
Northwest Railway Museum	Snoqualmie	Washington
Yakima Electric Railway Museum	Yakima	Washington
Martinsburg Roundhouse	Martinsburg	West Virginia
Harper's Ferry Toy Train Museum	Harper's Ferry	West Virginia
West Virginia Railroad Museum	Elkins	West Virginia
Rowlesburg Depot	Rowlesburg	West Virginia
Tunnelton Depot	Tunnelton	West Virginia
Mon Valley Railroad Historical Society	Morgantown	West Virginia
Kruger Street Toy and Train Museum	Wheeling	West Virginia
Huntington Railroad Museum	Huntington	West Virginia
East Troy Electric Railroad Museum	East Troy	Wisconsin
Mid-Continent Railway Museum	North Freedom	Wisconsin
National Railroad Museum	Ashwaubenon	Wisconsin
Riverside and Great Northern Railway	Wisconsin Dells	Wisconsin
Western Union Junction Railroad Museum	Sturtevant	Wisconsin
Cheyenne Depot Museum	Cheyenne	Wyoming

== Oceania ==
=== Australia ===
- Archer Park Rail Museum
- Canberra Railway Museum
- Dorrigo Steam Railway & Museum
- Lachlan Valley Railway
- National Railway Museum, Port Adelaide, Port Adelaide
- Newport Railway Museum, Champion Road, North Williamstown
- NSW Rail Museum, Thirlmere
- Rail Motor Society, Paterson
- Railway Museum, Bassendean, Western Australia
- Richmond Vale Railway Museum
- Rosewood Railway Museum, Rosewood
- Steamtown Heritage Rail Centre
- The Workshops Rail Museum, Ipswich, Queensland
- Valley Heights Locomotive Depot Heritage Museum

== South America ==
=== Argentina ===
- Museo Nacional Ferroviario (Ciudad Autónoma de Buenos Aires)
- Ferroclub Argentino: Centros de Preservacion Remedios de Escalada, Lynch y Tolosa
- Museo Ferroviario de la ciudad de Campana (Buenos Aires)

=== Chile ===
- Museo Nacional Ferroviario Pablo Neruda, Temuco
- Museo Ferroviario de Santiago, Quinta Normal

=== Brazil ===
- Araraquara Railway Museum
- Jaguariuna Railway Museum
- Juiz de Fora Railway Museum (pt)
- Museu of Train of Rio de Janeiro
- Paranapiacaba Technologic Railway Museum
- Rio Claro Railway Museum (future)

=== Peru ===
- National Railway Museum (Peru)

== See also ==
- List of railway museums in the United Kingdom
- List of New Zealand railway museums and heritage lines
