= Metro Museum =

Metro Museum may refer to:

- Tokyo Metro Museum
- Shanghai Metro Museum
- Wuhan Metro Museum
