= Romancecar Museum =

Railway museum in Ebina, Japan

The Romancecar Museum or ロマンスaカーミュージアム is a railway museum located in Ebina in the Kanagawa prefecture of Japan.

== History ==
Construction of the museum, owned and run by the company Odakyū, broke ground on January 23rd, 2019, with the company holding a ceremony to pray for safe construction. The museum, located beside Ebina Station, opened on Monday, April 19th, 2021.

The Romancecar Museum is named after Odakyu’s luxury limited express “Romancecar” series which was first introduced in 1957 as a fast tourist train. In 1957, the Romancecar broke the world speed record for narrow-gauge trains by traveling 145 kilometers per hour. The Romancecar is said to have inspired the design for the first Shinkansen bullet train.

The museum displays different models of the railway's signature express trains. The two-story museum has 4,400 square meters of indoor exhibition space.

== Gallery ==
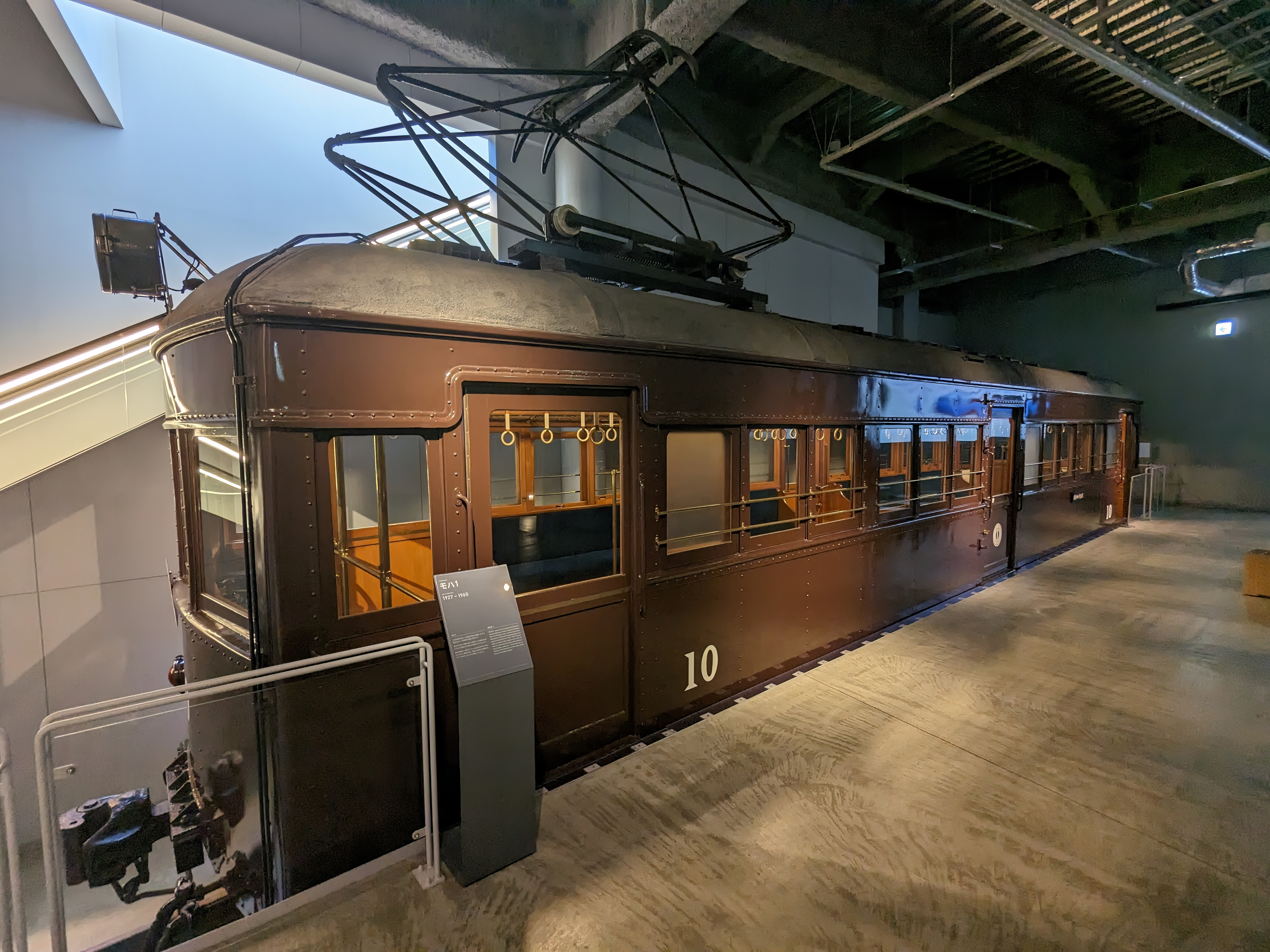
Moha 1

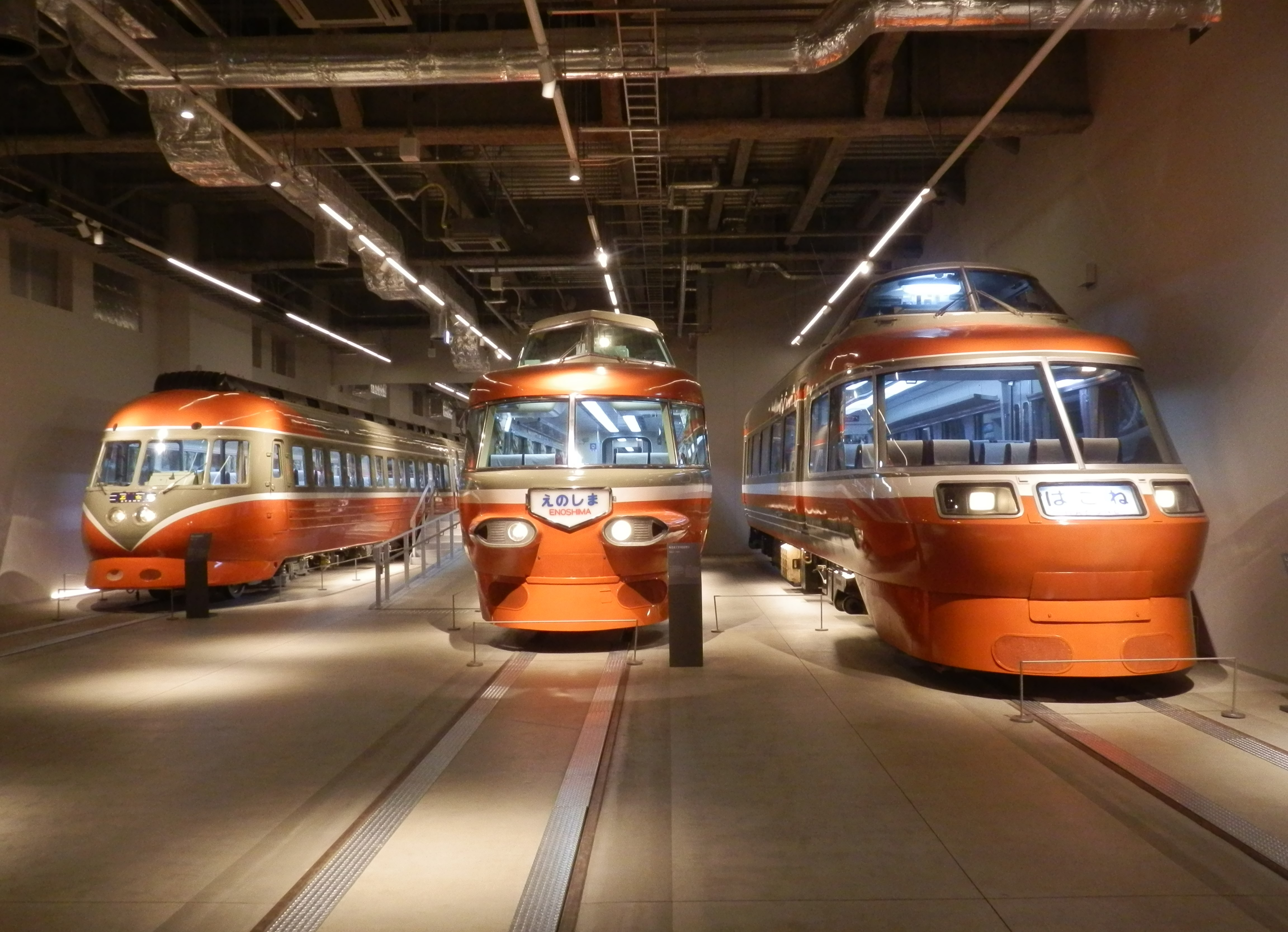
Romancecar (SE, NSE, LSE)

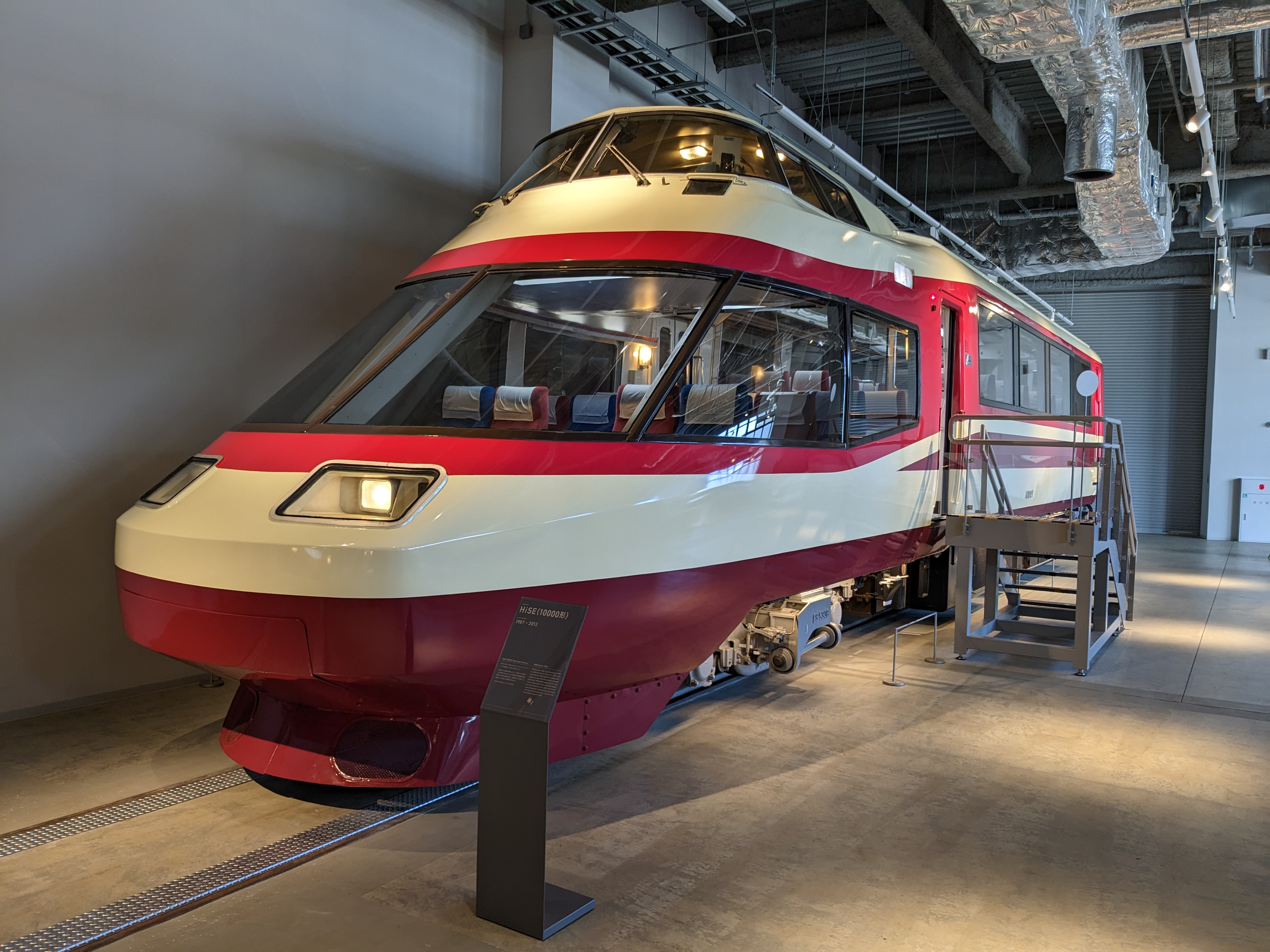
Romancecar HiSE

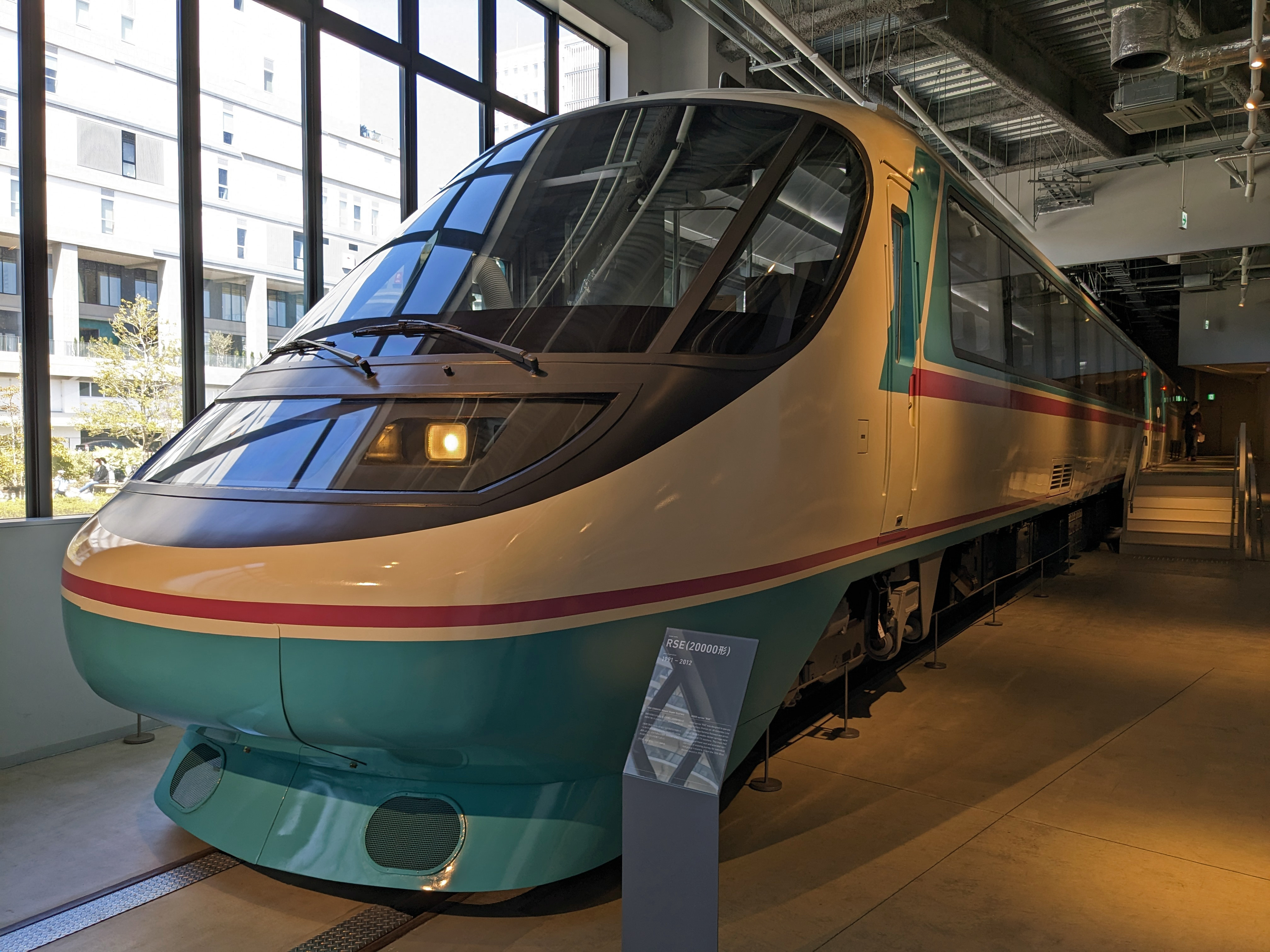
Romancecar RSE
