= Elkhorn City Railroad Museum =

Appalachian railroad museum

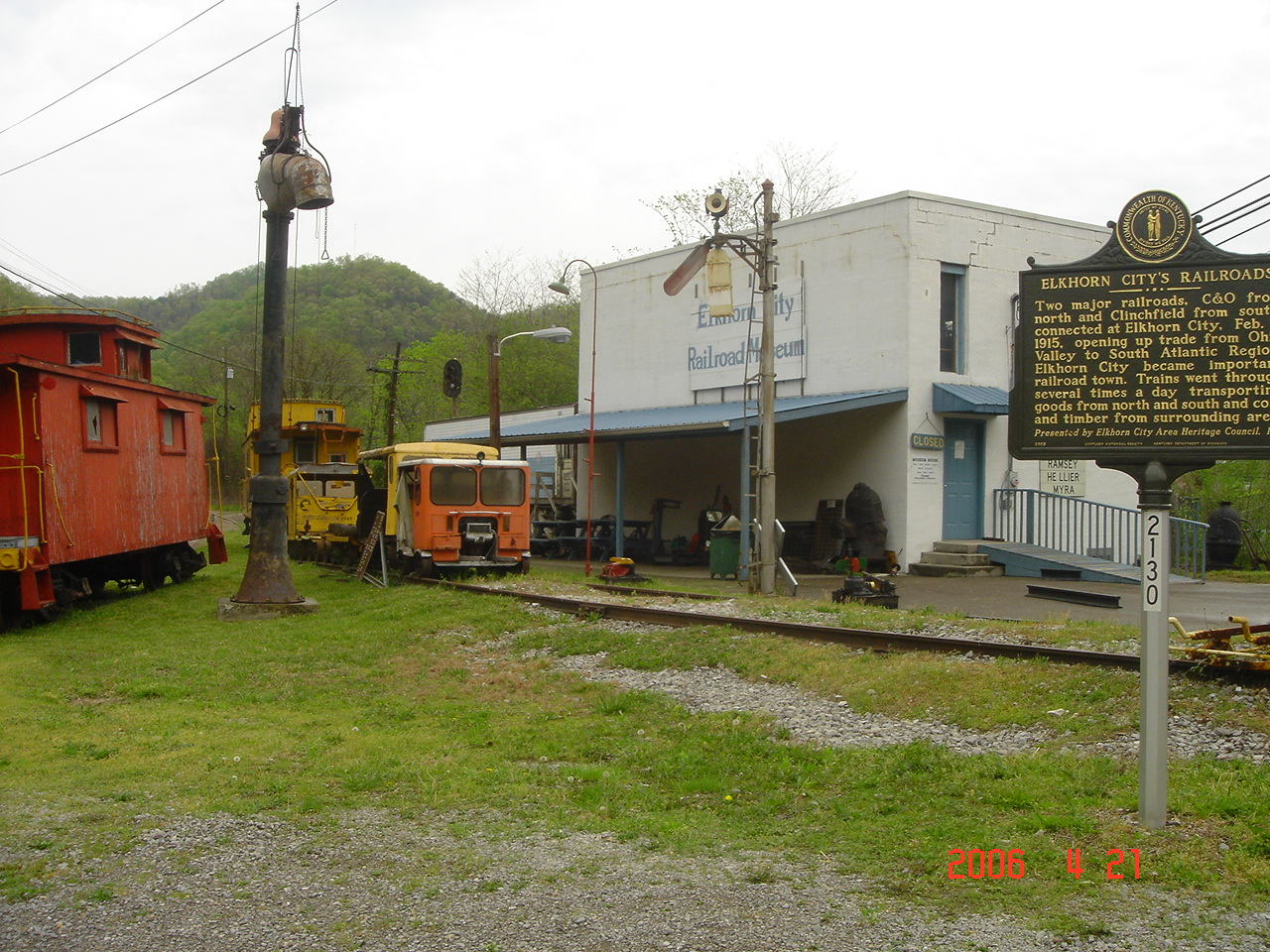
- Elkhorn City Railroad Museum

- Location within Kentucky Location within the United States
- Established: 1990
- Location: 100 Pine Street, Elkhorn City, Kentucky 41522
- Coordinates: 37.304996°N 82.341548°W
- Type: Railroad
- Founder: Edward "Chick" Spradlin
- Manager: Larry Lounsberry
- Director: Wendall Ward
- Curator: Larry Lounsberry
- Owner: Elkhorn City Heritage Council
- Parking: On site (no charge)
- Website: elkhorncityrrm.tripod.com

The Elkhorn City Railroad Museum is a railroad museum located in Elkhorn City, Kentucky. The museum was established in 1990 and is dedicated to educating the public on the history of railroads in Kentucky's Eastern Mountain Coal Fields region. It also documents the history of the local timber and coal industries and local genealogy.

== History ==
The museum was founded by Edward "Chick" Spradlin; a retired railroad employee. Most of Spradlin's 40-year career was spent in Elkhorn City railyard which was the northern terminus of the Clinchfield Railroad before it closed in 1981. Wanting to preserve the history of the railroad in the area he and a few other former railroad employees started collecting artifacts and opened the museum in 1990 in a former Coal company office that was donated to the museum.

In 1999 Chick died and management of the museum was transferred to the Elkhorn City Heritage Council. An organization created to preserve the history of the Elkhorn City area. The museum is still staffed by volunteers; most of whom are former railroad employees.

In 2016 a water line break caused the main building to flood. This ruined many of the museum's pieces and caused it to temporarily close. A plan to renovate the museum was implemented in 2019. In 2020 the museum temporarily closed due to the COVID-19 pandemic and reopened by 2022.

== Exhibits ==
More than 1,000 pieces of railroad memorabilia dating from the 1800s to today are on display. Including two cabooses, velocipedes, motor cars, antique uniforms and equipment. As well as a seat from the private railcar of President James Garfield. Also on display are exhibits detailing the completion of the Clinchfield Railroad which was considered an engineering marvel at the time. All items and exhibits have been donated to the museum. Most of which were abandoned by the railroad when it closed and salvaged by members of the community. During the winter months when the museum is closed some displays are moved to the library and occasionally to area schools.

The museum is also a stop on CSX's annual Santa train. A Christmas-themed train that distributes toys, food, and clothing in the Appalachian region every November.
