= Cranbrook History Centre =

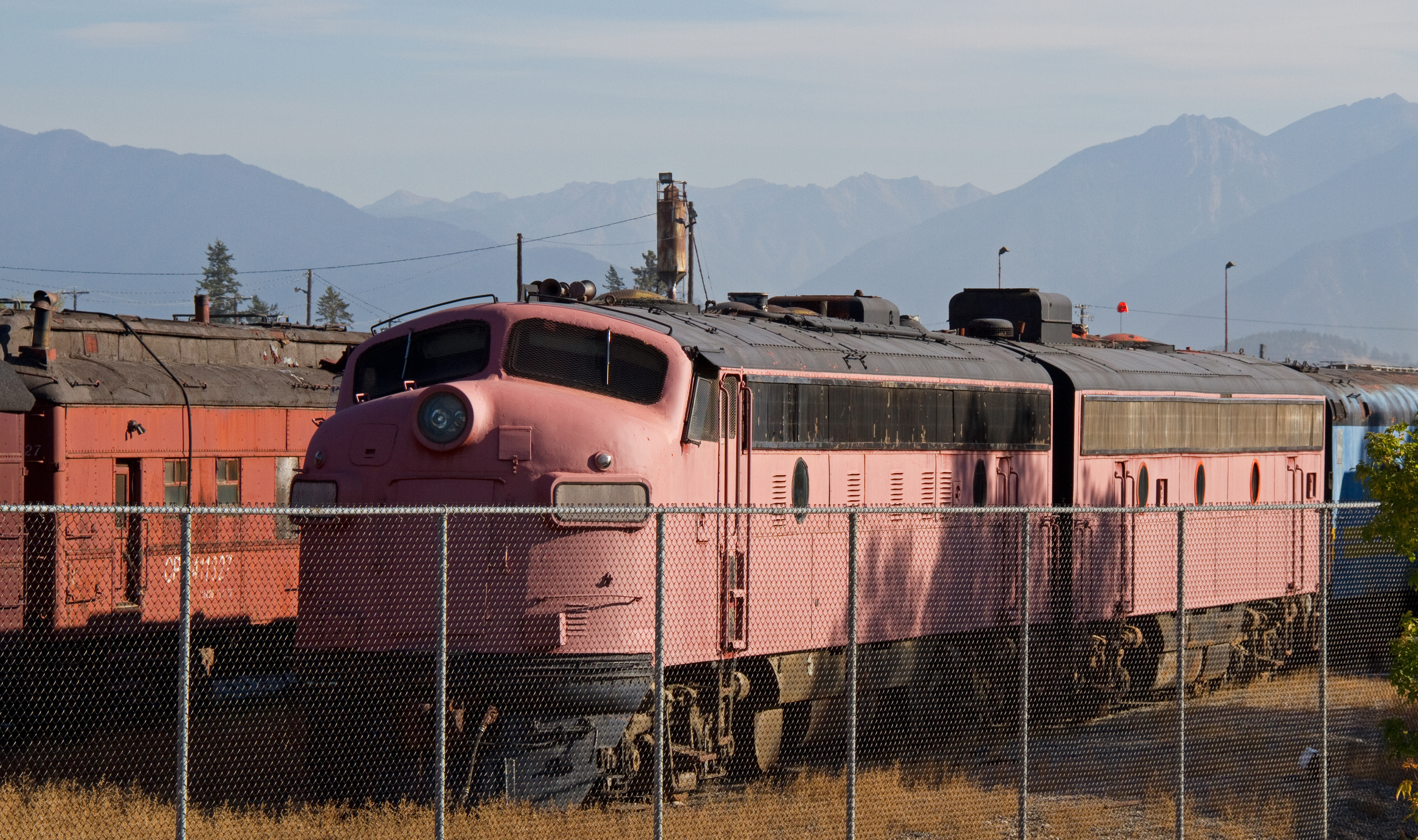
- FP9 locomotive No. 1409 on display
- Established: 1977
- Location: Cranbrook, British Columbia
- Coordinates: 49°30′39″N 115°46′27″W
- Type: Railway museum
- Visitors: 7,000+
- Curator: Honor Neve
- Website: www.cranbrookhistorycentre.com

The Cranbrook History Centre, formerly the Canadian Museum of Rail Travel, or its brand name "Trains Deluxe", is located in Cranbrook, British Columbia, Canada, a city of about 25,000 on the west side of the Rocky Mountains. The city was developed by the arrival of the Canadian Pacific Railway (CPR) in 1898, as the administrative centre for the railway's "Crowsnest Pass" route. This deep connection with the railway was the driving force behind the founding of the original museum and while the city is still a busy railway centre with Canadian and international freight traffic, the area's rich history extends far back before the railway's introduction and the museum has recently expanded the exhibits to reflect this. Cranbrook was incorporated as a city in 1905 when Cranbrook boomed into the major economic, and commercial centre of the Kootenays.

== History ==
The museum, opened in 1977, originally focused entirely on restoring and displaying vintage passenger trains - the transcontinental "Deluxe Hotels-On-Wheels". Many of these original features are still present and train culture remains central to the museum, and town's, identity. The original museum emphasized deluxe railway passenger car design in various eras (1886, 1907, 1929, 1936) as well as deluxe railway hotel architecture. The museum is an outgrowth of the Cranbrook Archives, Museum and Landmark Foundation, founded in 1976 with the initial goal of converting an out of service rail car into a local art gallery. The group then discovered that they had unknowingly purchased a dining car from the short-lived Trans-Canada Limited luxury rail line (1929-1931), and the focus of the project shifted to more extensive rail rehabilitation efforts. Founder Garry Anderson was awarded the Order of Canada in 2007 for his efforts in developing the museum.

More recently, the Museum has expanded its focus to embody the larger history of the area, and region. The Cranbrook History Centre now collects, preserves, and displays artifacts and archival records of permanent value to the history of Cranbrook, the East Kootenay, and Canadian rail travel. The collecting scope currently emphasizes three areas:

- Artifacts and specimens which communicate the human and natural history of the city site of Cranbrook, and the East Kootenay.
- Artifacts and heavy track equipment which narrate the social, political, economic, and technological impact of rail travel in Canada.
- Archive material in the form of photographs, documents, film, and digital information associated with the City of Cranbrook, Canadian rail travel, and the East Kootenay.

== Cranbrook Museum ==
The Cranbrook History Centre celebrates the rich culture and heritage of the East Kootenay region. Situated in the original 1898 Cranbrook Freight Shed, museum displays include first nations histories, early settler artifacts and information about regional wildlife. Early photographs and timelines honour those who came before and helped build the community we know today.

=== The Galleries ===
==== Cranbrook History Gallery ====
The Cranbrook History Gallery will showcase topics that highlight the history and culture of our area. This will include local history and folklore, natural history, palaeontology, and Ktunaxa First Nation traditions.

==== Paleontology Gallery / Ted Fiedler Room ====
The Paleontology Gallery (featuring a collection donated by Michel Plourde) is the newest edition to the Cranbrook History Centre. It features a number of fossils from the Fort Steele and Burgess Shale regions, as well as a beautiful mural painted by Rosalie Dureski.

== Train Collections ==
The largest exhibition at the Cranbrook History Centre is a collection of 28 railway cars of which 13 are currently available to the public. Highlights of the collection include the 7 cars of the 1929 “Trans-Canada Limited” (a classic “Jazz Era Art Deco” design), 2 cars of the 1907 “Soo-Spokane Train” (a deluxe example of “Edwardian Art Nouveau Elegance”), and the 1927 executive night car “Strathcona” which has housed many VIP guests during its time in service, including Queen Elizabeth II, John & Jackie Kennedy and Sir Winston Churchill.

These remarkable rail travel cars, comprise one of the largest collections in North America, and are in a continued state of restoration. Because of the fragile nature of this irreplaceable collection, our immediate priority is to provide a permanent covered roof to ensure these ‘deluxe hotels on wheels’ are preserved for future visitors and historians alike.

The collections have included:

- the "Pacific Express" (1886) (two original cars),
- the "Soo-Spokane Train Deluxe" (1907) (four original cars). The cars in this set include a compartment-observation-buffet-library car, a palace sleeper, and a first class day car. The fourth car is a baggage car.
- the "Trans-Canada Limited" (1929) (a complete restored 7-car set). Recipient of Heritage Canada's "Achievement Award" for restoration in 1993. The cars in this set include a crew baggage car, a day parlour car, a dining car, three first class sleepers, and a Solarium-Lounge car.
- the "Chinook" (1936) (a complete four-car set)
- cars that expand the story line including Royal and Business cars.
- the "Royal Alexandra Hall" (1906) the restored former Grand Cafe of the luxurious Royal Alexandra Hotel, Winnipeg, built by the CPR in 1906, but demolished in 1971, with the Museum obtaining the contents in 1999 and opening the Hall in 2004. Recipient of Heritage Canada's "Achievement Award" for restoration in 2007. It can hold up to 184 for formal diner, 280 for concert, and 400 for stand up receptions. There are adjacent facilities that expand the use of this Hall, and which cater to groups of visitors that tour the historic trains.

Instead of the usual mechanical and technological focus that most railway museums employ, the museum emphasizes the social aspects of the railway through travel and design.

It located downtown next to the busy rail yards of the CPR, on Highway 3/95, a major east-west Canadian arterial highway, and a major north-south route linking Banff and Japser National Parks with the Pacific North-West of the US. Cranbrook is about 50 miles (80 km) north of the Idaho and Montana border with Canada and British Columbia.

The back of the Museum has a siding track for excursion trains arrival, with doors into the Museum's large entrance hall from this track. The spectacular "Royal Canadian Pacific" (a high-end excursion train operated by the CPR on a circle route through the Rockies, out of Calgary, Alberta), uses this facility, as well as occasional special excursions of the CPR's famed #2816 restored "Hudson" style steam locomotive.

A 1992 study about the historical significance of the collections was recently updated by the author, Rober Turner, Curator Emeritus of the Royal British Columbia Museum, in which he states that "the museum is unparalleled anywhere in Canada, and is clearly of national as well as international importance".

== See also ==
- List of heritage railways in Canada
- Canadian Pacific Railway
