= West Virginia Railroad Museum =

Coordinates: 38.92335°N 79.85116°W

The West Virginia Railroad Museum is a railroad museum development located at 2 Railroad Avenue, WV 26241. The museum opened in 2014.
