= Fairfax station =

- Minneapolis and St. Louis Depot
- U.S. National Register of Historic Places
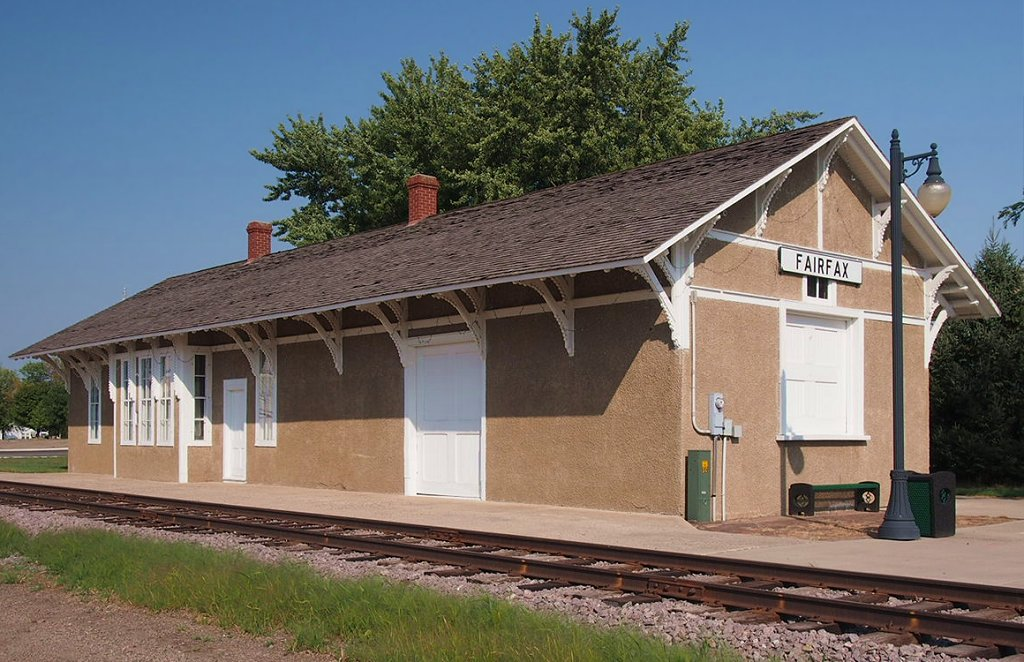
- Fairfax Depot (2012)

- Location within Minnesota Location within the United States
- Location: Park St. and 2nd Ave., S., Fairfax, Minnesota
- Coordinates: 44°31′35″N 94°43′12″W
- Built: 1883
- NRHP reference No.: 86001921
- Added to NRHP: July 24, 1986

The Minneapolis and St. Louis Depot in Fairfax, Minnesota, United States, is a one-story, stucco-covered wood-frame building with a gabled roof built in 1883 by the Minneapolis and St. Louis Railroad (M&StL). The interior of the depot includes a waiting room, freight room, and central office. It was listed on the National Register of Historic Places in 1986. It is Renville County's only surviving M&StL depot as well as the oldest and most architecturally significant depot in the county.

The M&StL established a line along the north side of the Minnesota River through southeastern Renville County in 1882. The line was extended westward into South Dakota in 1883–84. Tracks and a siding at Fairfax were built in September and October 1882, and the depot was constructed the following spring based on one of its standard combination depot plans. By the summer of 1883 Fairfax was serviced by four trains daily which stopped at the depot, providing the newly established community with its primary link with the rest of the county and state. The depot at Fairfax served as a center of community activity during its early years, and continued to provide passenger and freight service to the area until after World War II.

Today the depot serves as a local museum.
