= Wuhan Metro Museum =

Transport museum in Wuhan, China

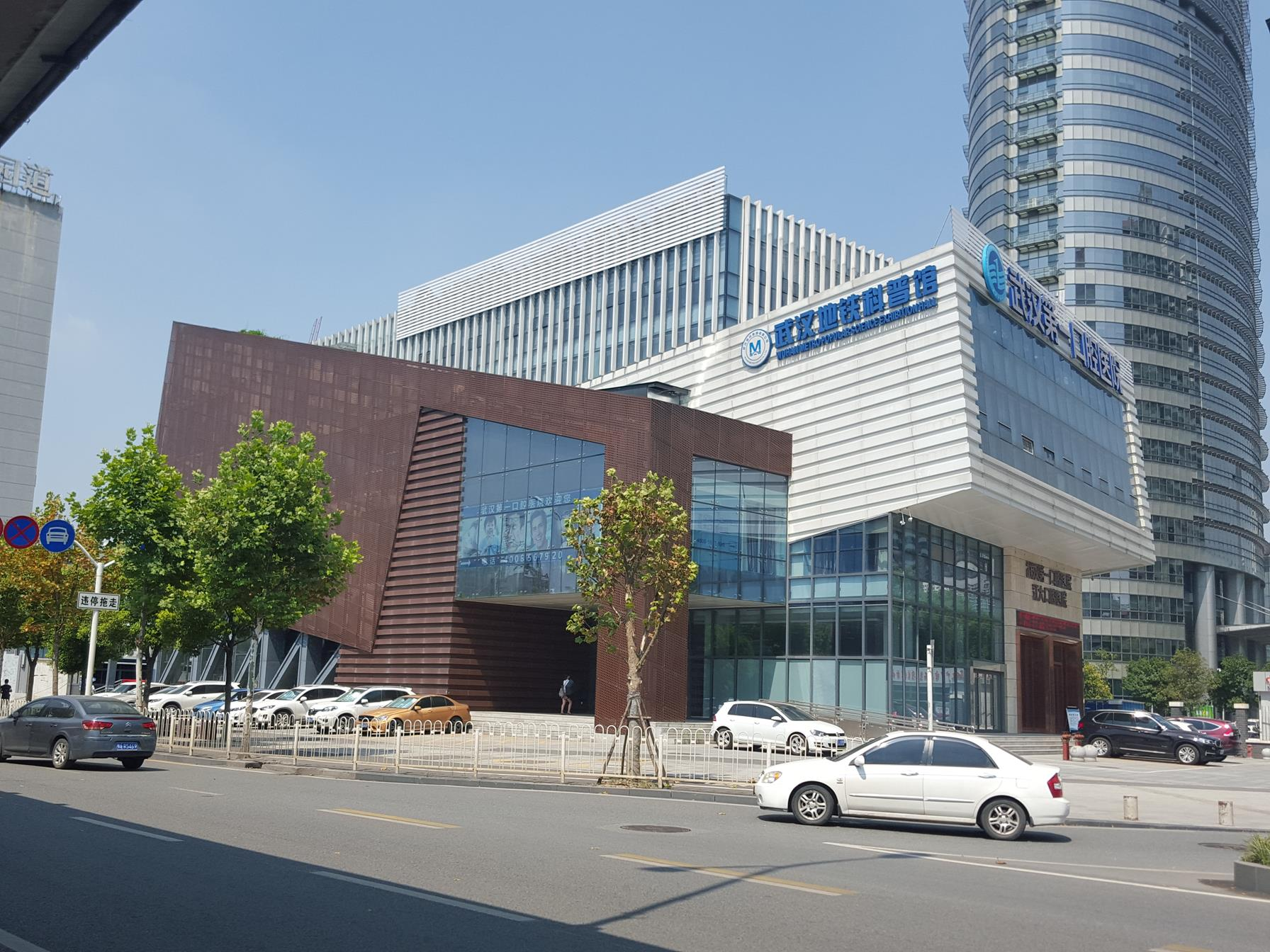
Wuhan Metro Museum

Wuhan Metro Museum (Chinese: 武汉地铁科普馆) is a transport museum located in Jianghan District, Wuhan, Hubei, China, next to the D1 exit of the Wangjiadun East Station on Line 2, Wuhan Metro. Its main exhibition includes the culture and history of Wuhan Metro, as well as the history of Metro in the world.

As at September 2026, the Metro Museum does not exist at that site. The interior access from the subway station appears to be golf shop and exterior access appears to be a medical centre.

== History ==
The museum opened on December 27, 2013, the second one of its type in China after that in Shenyang.

== Exhibitions ==
The museum displays include the following:

- The history and culture of Wuhan Metro.
- The history and culture of metro systems around the world.
- Introduction to different metro systems in the world.
- Technology regarding building and operating the Metro.
- Virtual driving, virtual operation, emergency escaping in tunnels, and fire drills.
