= Erandwane =

- Neighbourhood
- Erandwane, Pune

- Location in Maharashtra, India
- Coordinates: 18.5333°N 73.8514°E
- Country: India
- State: Maharashtra
- District: Pune

Government
  - Body: Pune Municipal Corporation

Languages
  - Official: Marathi
- Time zone: UTC+5:30 (IST)
- PIN: 411 004, 4110052, 411038
- Vehicle registration: MH-12
- Lok Sabha constituency: Pune
- Vidhan Sabha constituency: Shivajinagar Kothrud

Erandwane is a premium locality in Pune city, and the costliest locality in Pune according to the revised ready reckoner (RR) rates of 2025. This micro-market includes the famous Law College Road, Prabhat Road etc. It is known for being the location of ILS Law College, Film and Television Institute of India etc. It is the location for some of the most famous schools, colleges, shopping malls, restaurants, cinema halls, and hospitals in the south of Pune. Located next to Kothrud, which is home to numerous information technology companies such as Persistent Systems, Harbinger Systems, Tech Mahindra. there are numerous hostel and PG accommodations for men and women in Erandwane. Karve Road is the main road that links Erandwane with Kothrud. Marathi and English are the most commonly spoken language in the area.

== Prominent Places ==
Prominent places to visit in the area include Dashabhuja Ganapati Temple, Joshi's Museum of Miniature Railway, and Kamala Nehru Park. The Pune Fire Brigade Museum is also located here. Also called Late Keshavrao Narayanrao Jagtap Fire Brigade Museum, the museum houses variety of equipment used by the fire department including more than 100 antique firefighting equipment including a Rolls-Royce Dennis

== Education ==
Erandwane is famous for FTII as well as numerous other educational institutes. The most prominent among them are listed below.

- Garware College
- S N D T Adult Education
- Film and Television Institute of India
- IST Institute Of Management
- Smt. Kashibai Nawale College of Commerce
- Abhinava Vidyalaya English Medium Pre-Primary School
- The Router School
- Sinhgad School Of Gemmology & Jewellery Designing
- Sinhgad Spring Dale School
- Sinhgad Business School
- Bharati Vidyapeeth

== Malls & Markets ==
Erandwane is known for being the location for some of the most prominent shopping malls and shops in Pune. The most prominent among them are listed below.

- Central Mall
- Data Care Corporation
- Shreeganesh Computers
- Bamo Electronics
- Manoj Super Market
- Pragati Super Market
- Reliance SMART
- 93 Avenue

== Hotels and Restaurants ==
Erandwane is known for being the location for some of the most famous hotels and restaurants in Pune. The most prominent among them are listed below.

- Multi Spice
- Italy Via Punjab
- Wadeshwar Restaurant (Law College Road)
- Bhooj Adda
- Abhishek Hotel
- 12 Star Garuda
- Hotel Royalty
- Hotel Jagannath
- Nisarg Sea Food
- Samudra Restaurant
- Hotel Anand Veg
- Kalinga Restaurant & Bar
- Kalinga Veg Gourmet Kitchen
- Level 5 Bistro and Bar

The design of both the Level 5 Bistro and Bar and Kalinga Veg Gourmet Kitchen has been done by celebrity chef Amit Puri who has also curated the food menu; He is considered as one of the best restaurant consultants in the business.

== Hospitals ==
There are few prominent hospitals including Multi-speciality hospital in Erandwane as listed below.

- Deenanath Mangeshkar Hospital
- ACE Hospital.
- Ameya Clinic
- Mantri Hospital
- Sagar Nursing Home
- Galaxy Hospital
- Sahyadri Super-speciality Hospital

== See also ==
- Pune
- Bhooj Adda
