= Railway Museum, Mysore =

Railway museum in India

Coordinates: 12°18′58.74″N 76°38′36.03″E

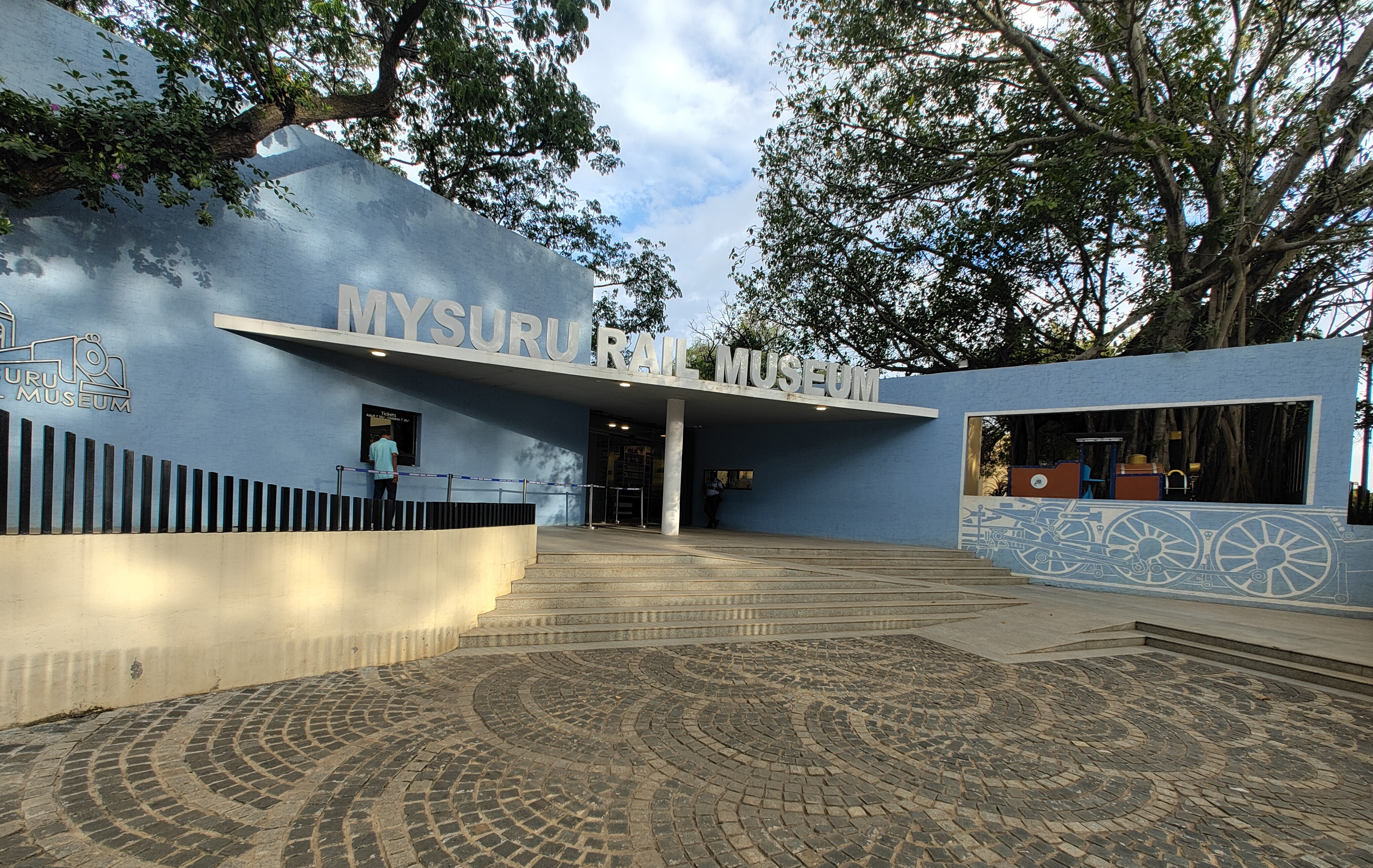

The Railway Museum at Mysore, India is an outdoor exhibit of vintage locomotives.

The Railway Museum was established in 1979 by Indian Railways, the second such museum after the National Railway Museum in Delhi. The museum is opposite the Central Food Technology and Research Institute on Krishnaraja Sagar Road. It has locomotives and a gallery of photographs and paintings depicting the growth of railways in India. Railway signals and lights are also displayed. The museum has a battery-operated mini-train giving a short ride for children on the grounds.

== Exhibits ==
Train Ride at Mysuru Rail Museum

- ES 506 4-6-2 is the first locomotive at the entrance .
- An Austin rail-motor car
- Several inspection cars, one inspection car is used as a ticket office.
- Two royal coaches that belonged to the Maharaja of Mysore.
- The Maharani Saloon carriage that has a kitchen, dining car unit and royal toilet dating back to 1899.
- A W.G. Bagnall #1625 which was made in 1900 for Khushalgarh - Kohat - Thal Railway which was a military frontier line, was subsequently transferred to North Western Railways. It operated at Timber Depot in Marala and was transferred later to Dhilwan Creosoting plant. This 2'-6" gauge locomotive is configured as 2-4-2ST.
- Class E #37244 4-4-4T from SIR built by North British Locomotive Co. in 1920. Originally # 8, it was one of the three superheated locomotives.
- Class TS/1 #37338 2-6-2T from SR, made by W.G. Bagnall in 1932 for Mysore State Railways.
- A YP #2511 made by Telco in 1963.

== Austin Railway Car ==
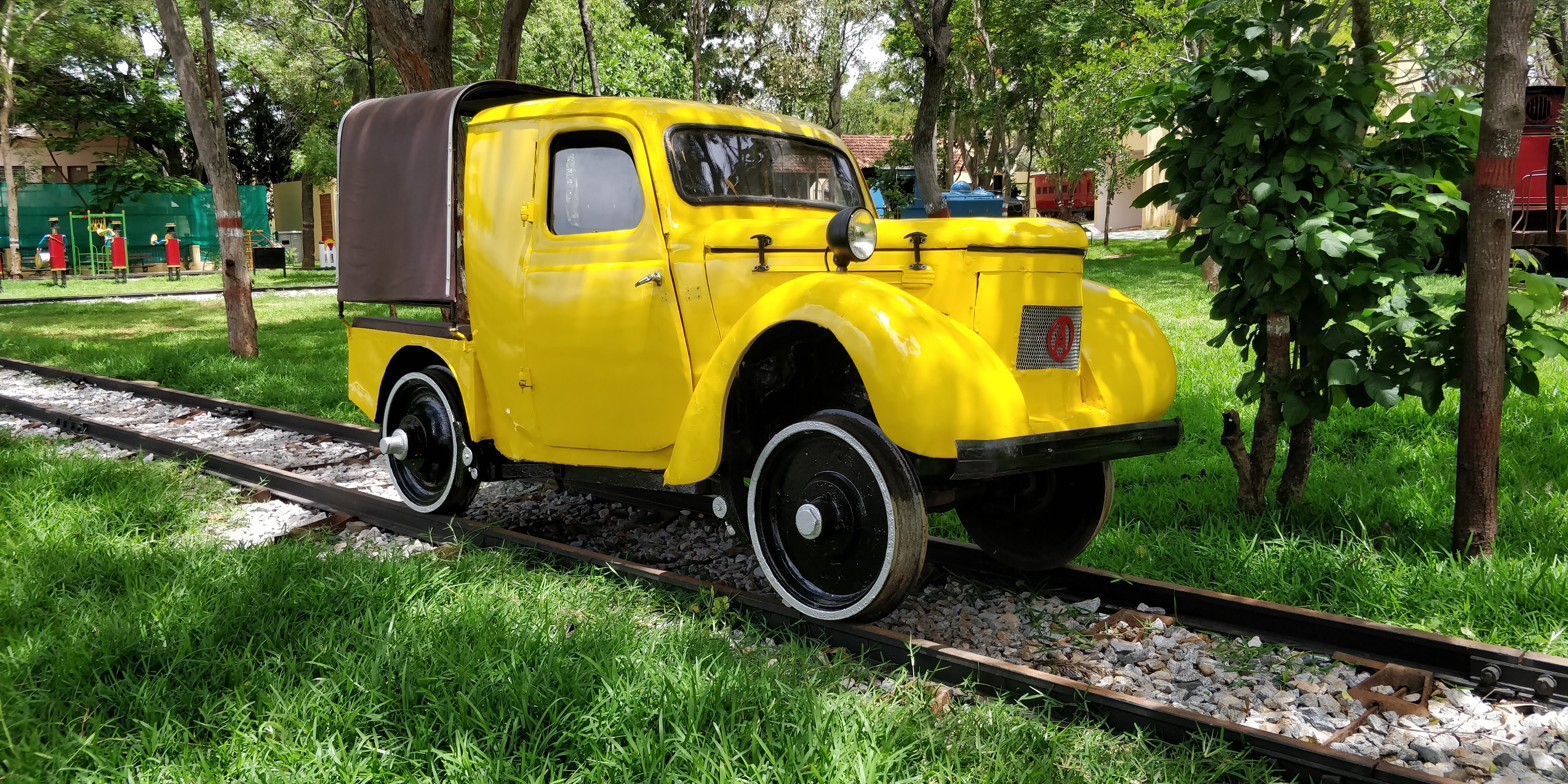

The picture at left is a 1925 model Austin, originally an automobile made for running on road. It was later sold to a scrap dealer. A railway employee brought this car from the scrap dealer and restored it. However, he made few major changes to the car. He fitted rail wheels to the car and removed the steering. Thus it began its journey as railcar. It was used for carrying inspection officials on track. It could carry six people.

== MG Steam Locomotive - YP-2511 ==
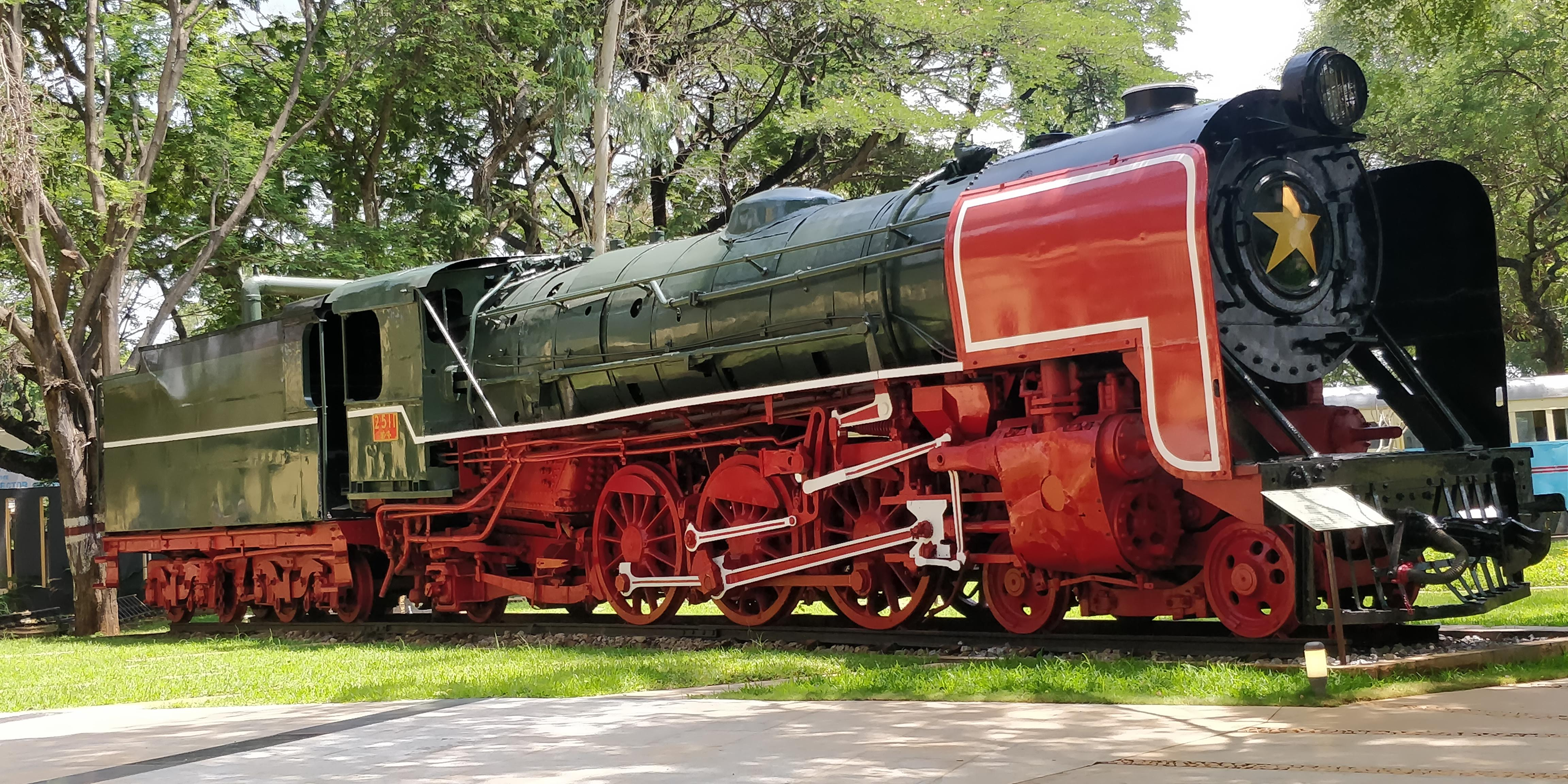

YP2511 was built by Telco in 1963. It is a meter gauge steam engine. The plate containing YP 2511 boiler's details mentions that the boiler was built in 1957. The boiler was numbered 2352.

== NG Steam Locomotive - 119 E ==
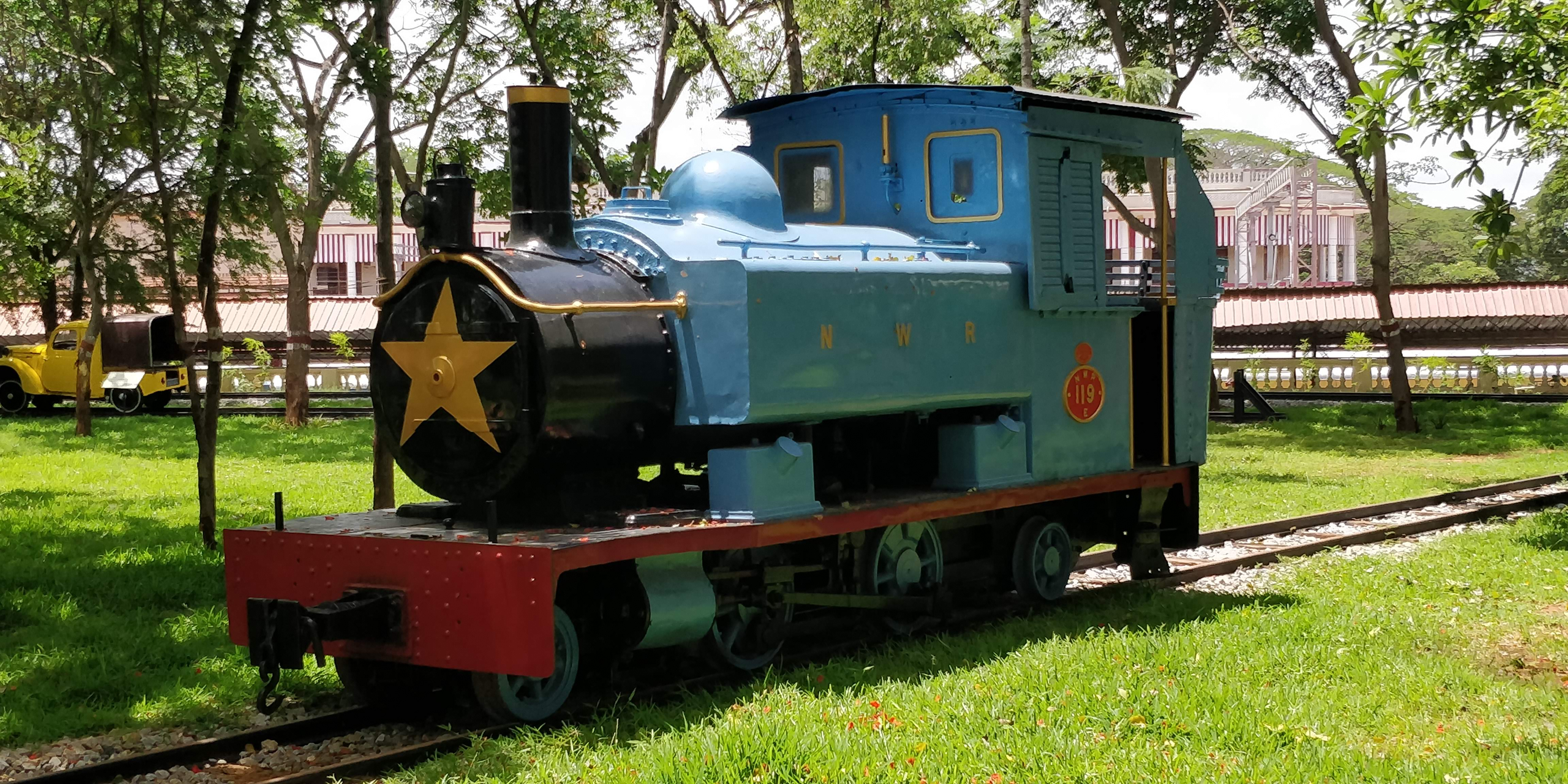
NG Steam Locomotive - 119 E

This North Western Railway NG Tank Loco No. 119 E used firewood as fuel instead of coal. It was built by W.G. Bagnall Ltd., England in 1900. Wheel Configuration: 2-4-2 Height: 3429 mm

== NG Steam Locomotive-E-506 ==
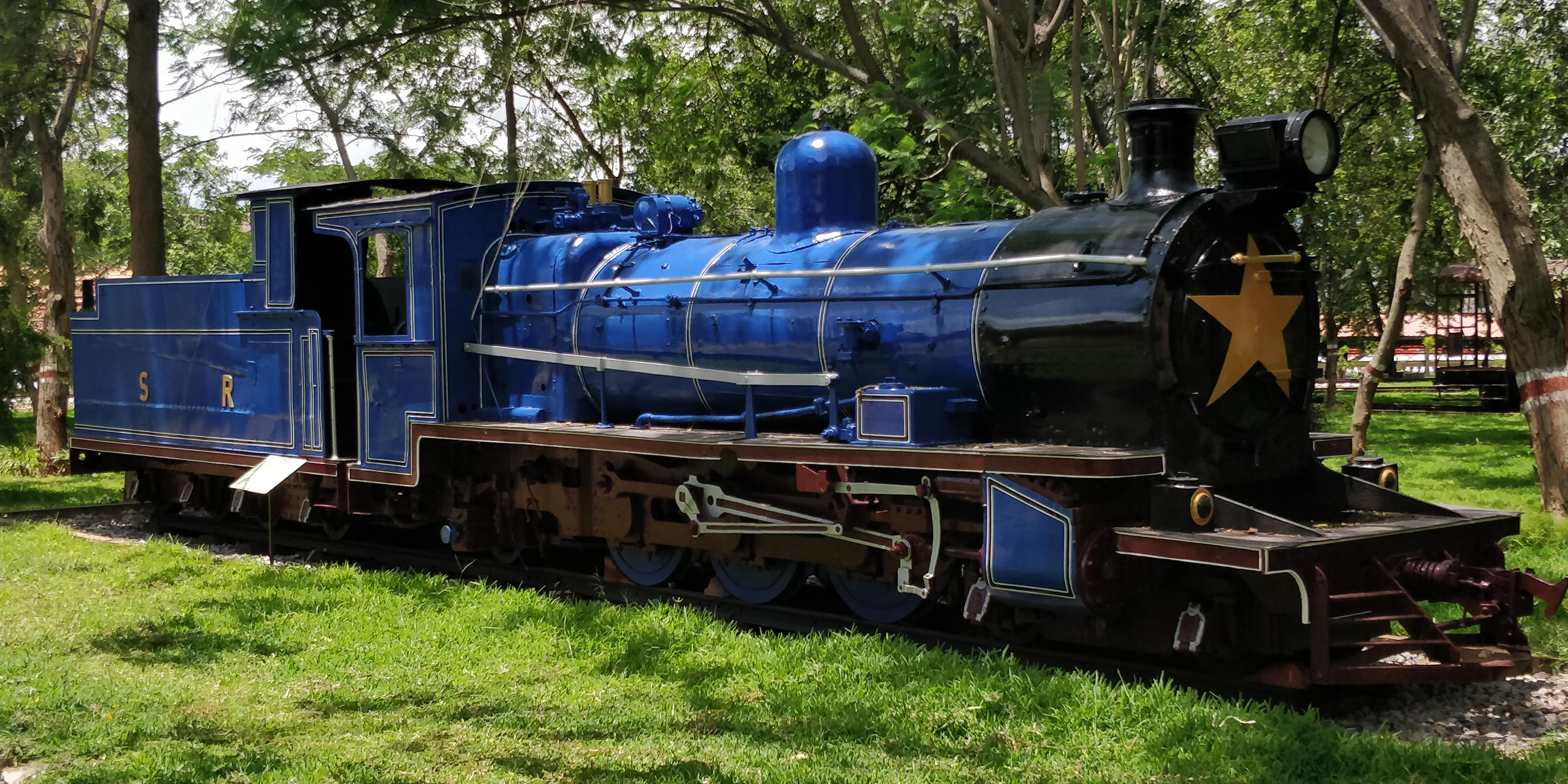
NG Steam Locomotive-E-506

This is a narrow gauge steam locomotive with 4-6-2 wheel arrangement was supplied to Mysore State Railway (MSR). An 'E' class locomotive rebuilt with a super-heater but not reclassified as ES class, became a Southern Railway locomotive and was renumbered 506 in 1957. It was a part of a batch of three locomotives (4237–9) supplied by Kerr, Stuart and Co.Ltd., England (KS) in 1922. The MSR also had another six E, ES & ES1 class locomotives, all built by KS. The ES was used for mixed traffic operations on the Bangalore- Bangarapet line. They also worked on Kolar District & Bangalore-Chikballapur Railway.

== MG Steam Locomotive -TS 37338 ==
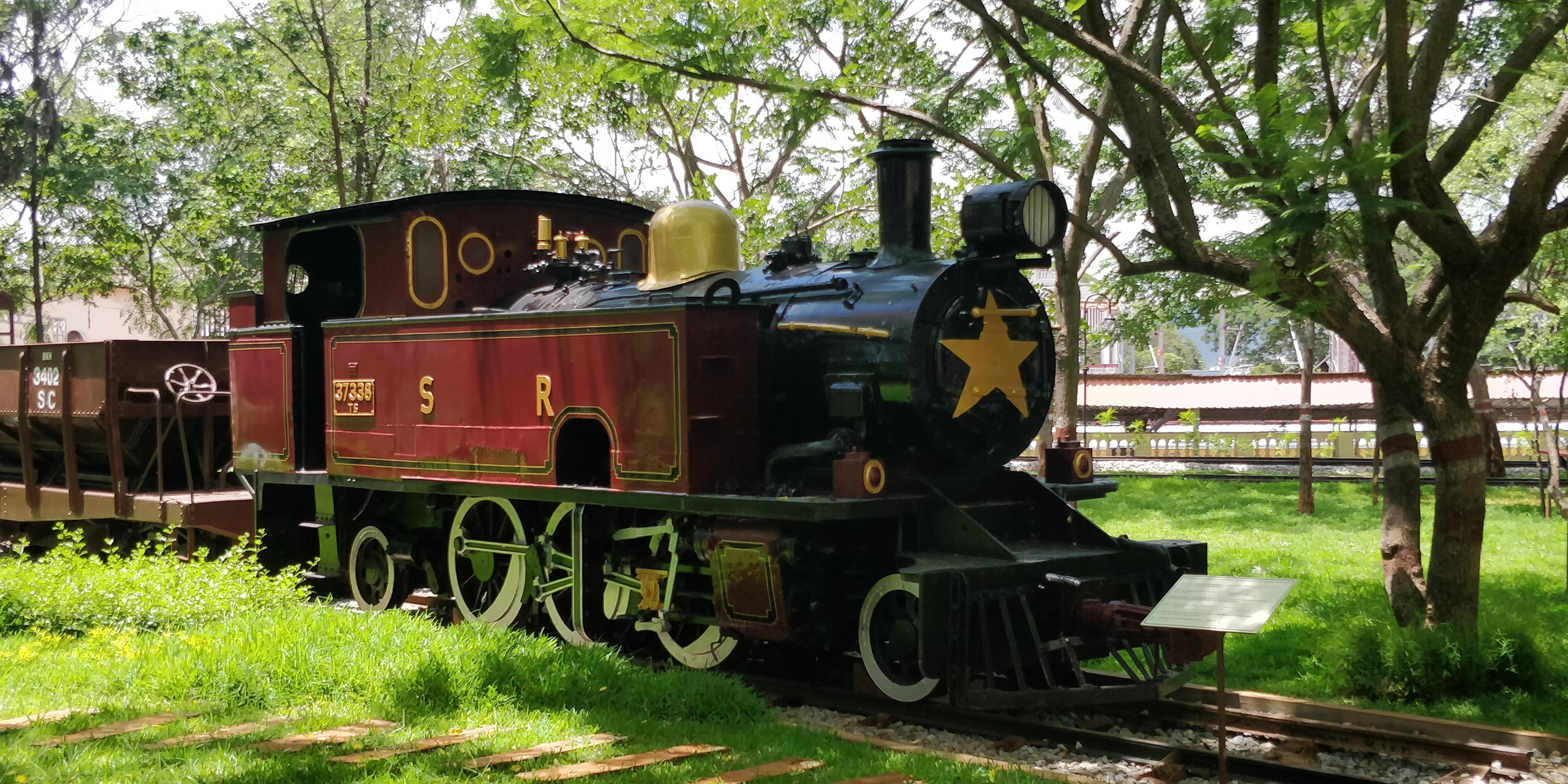
MG Steam Locomotive -TS 37338

This 2-6-2T was manufactured by W.G.Bagnall Ltd., Stafford, England in 1932 for Mysore State Railway. The TS was a metre gauge suburban tank engine, used on slow passenger services on the Bangalore-Tumkur line.

== Gallery ==

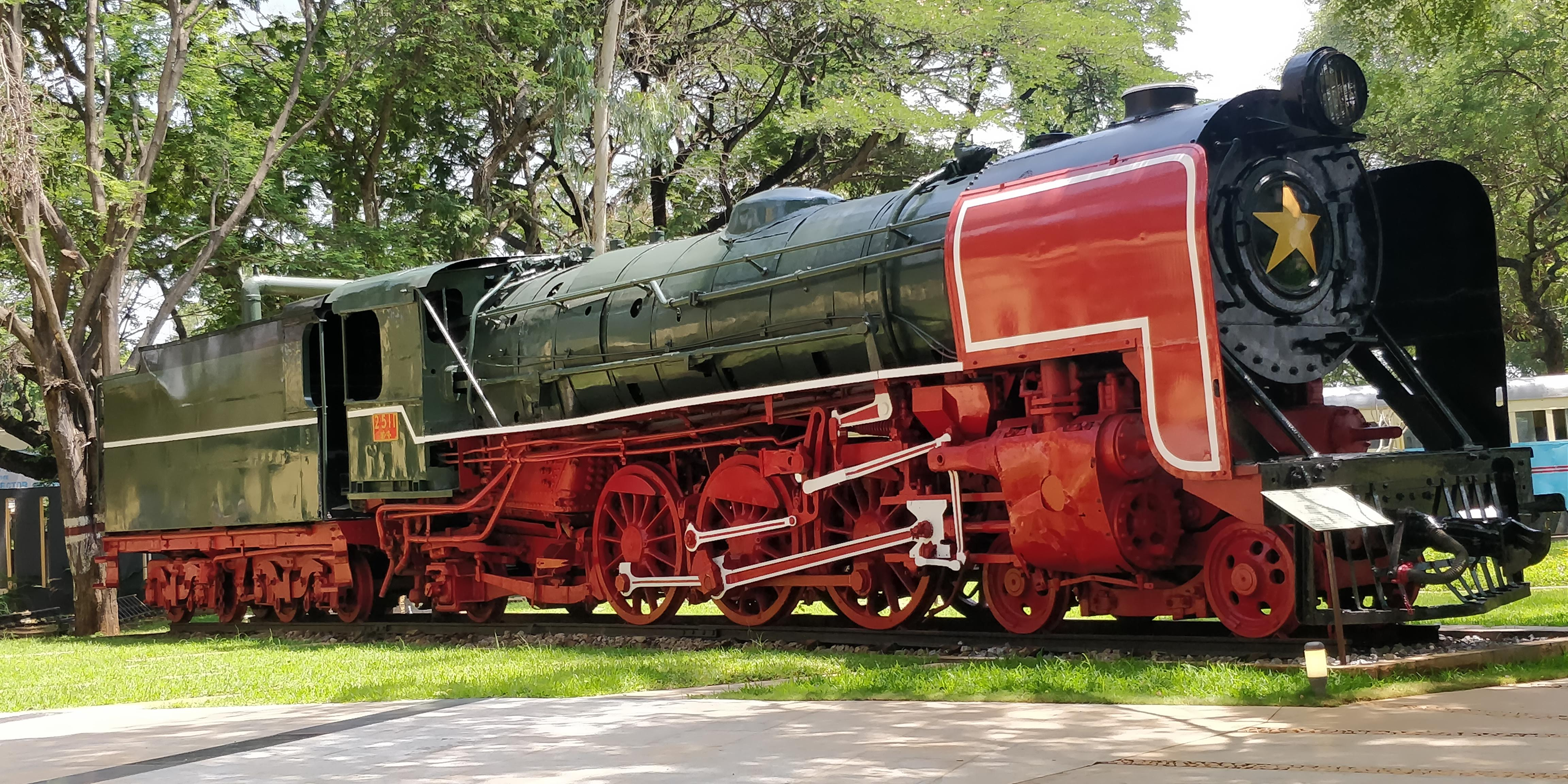

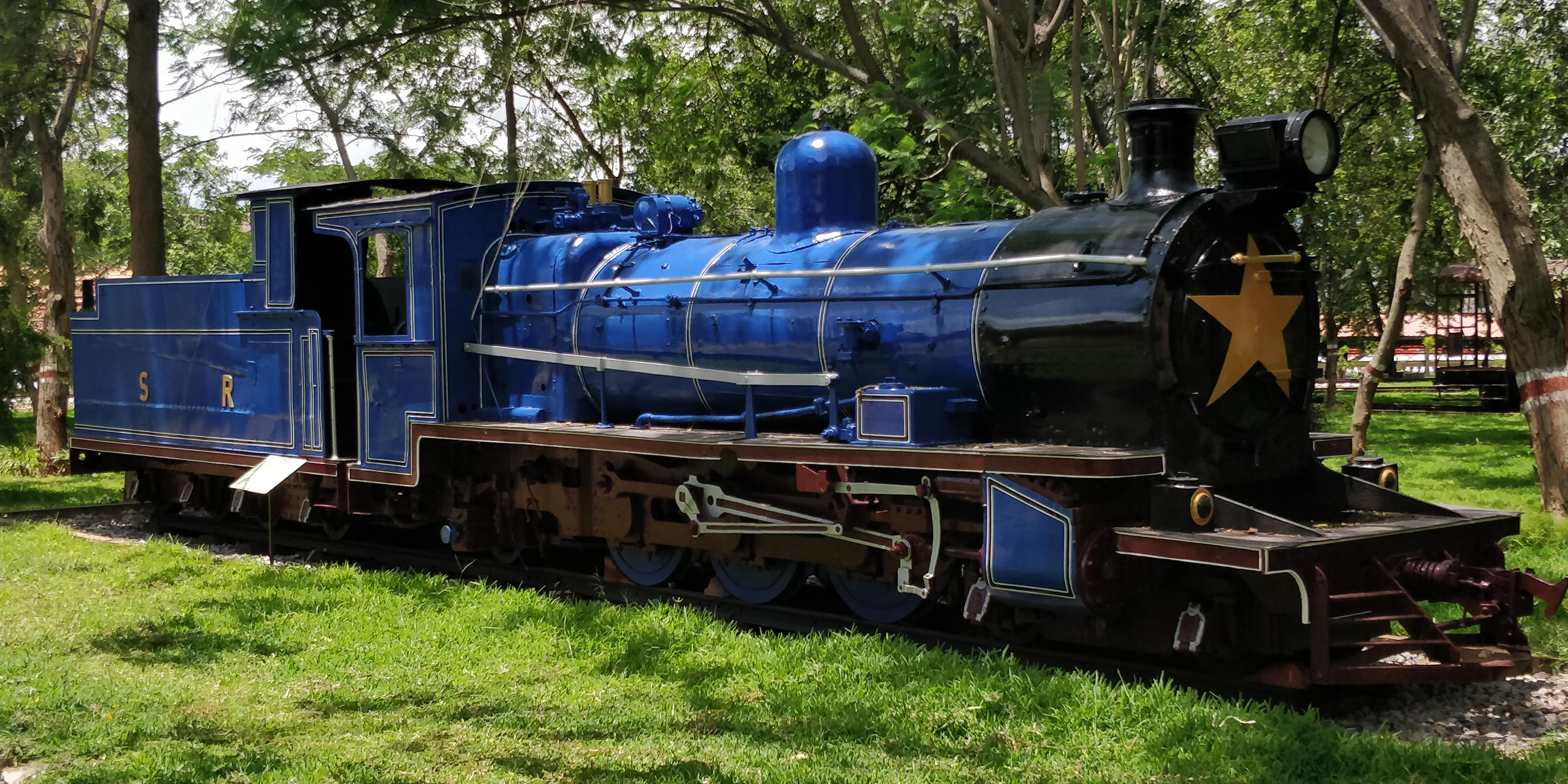

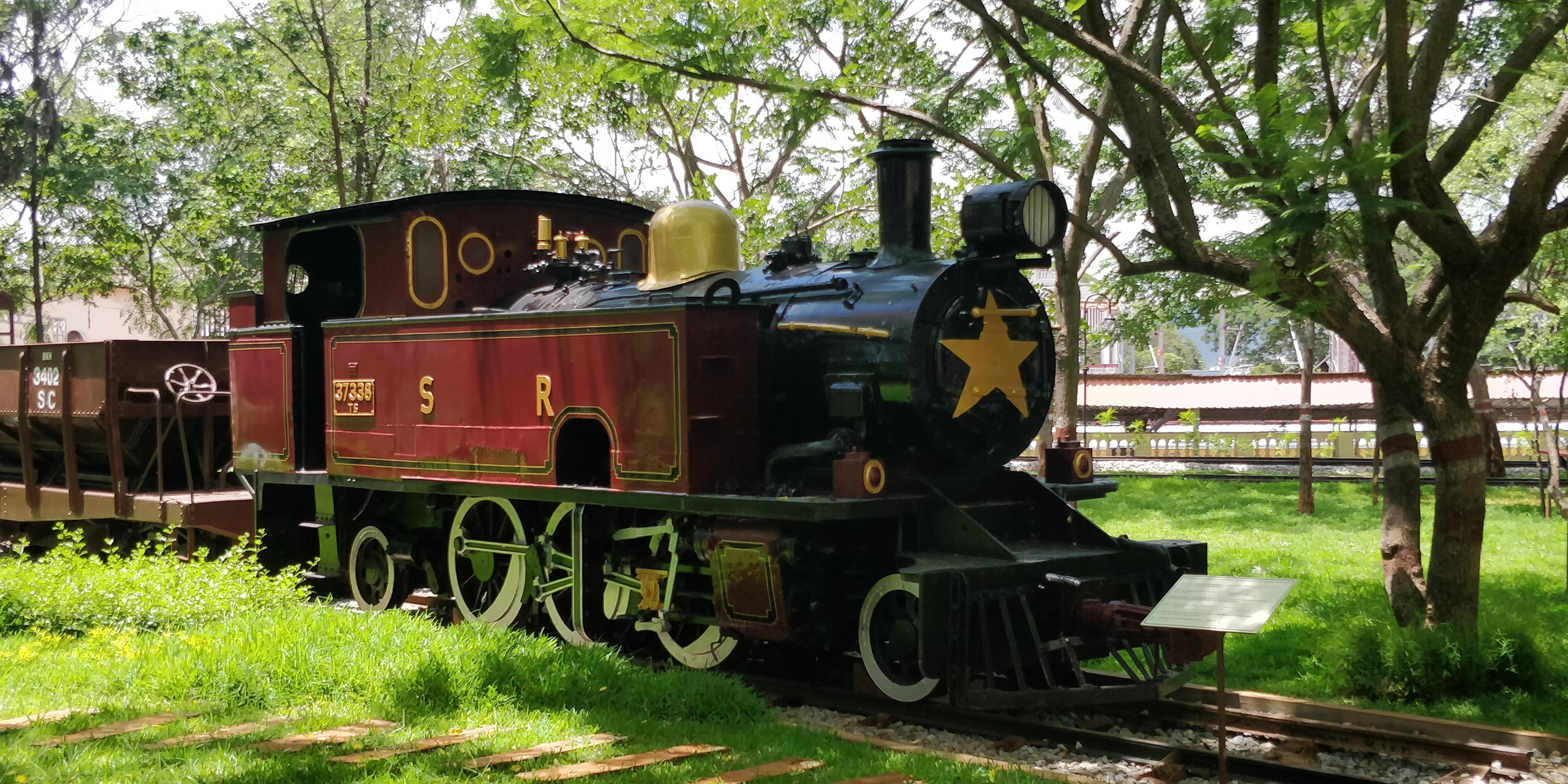

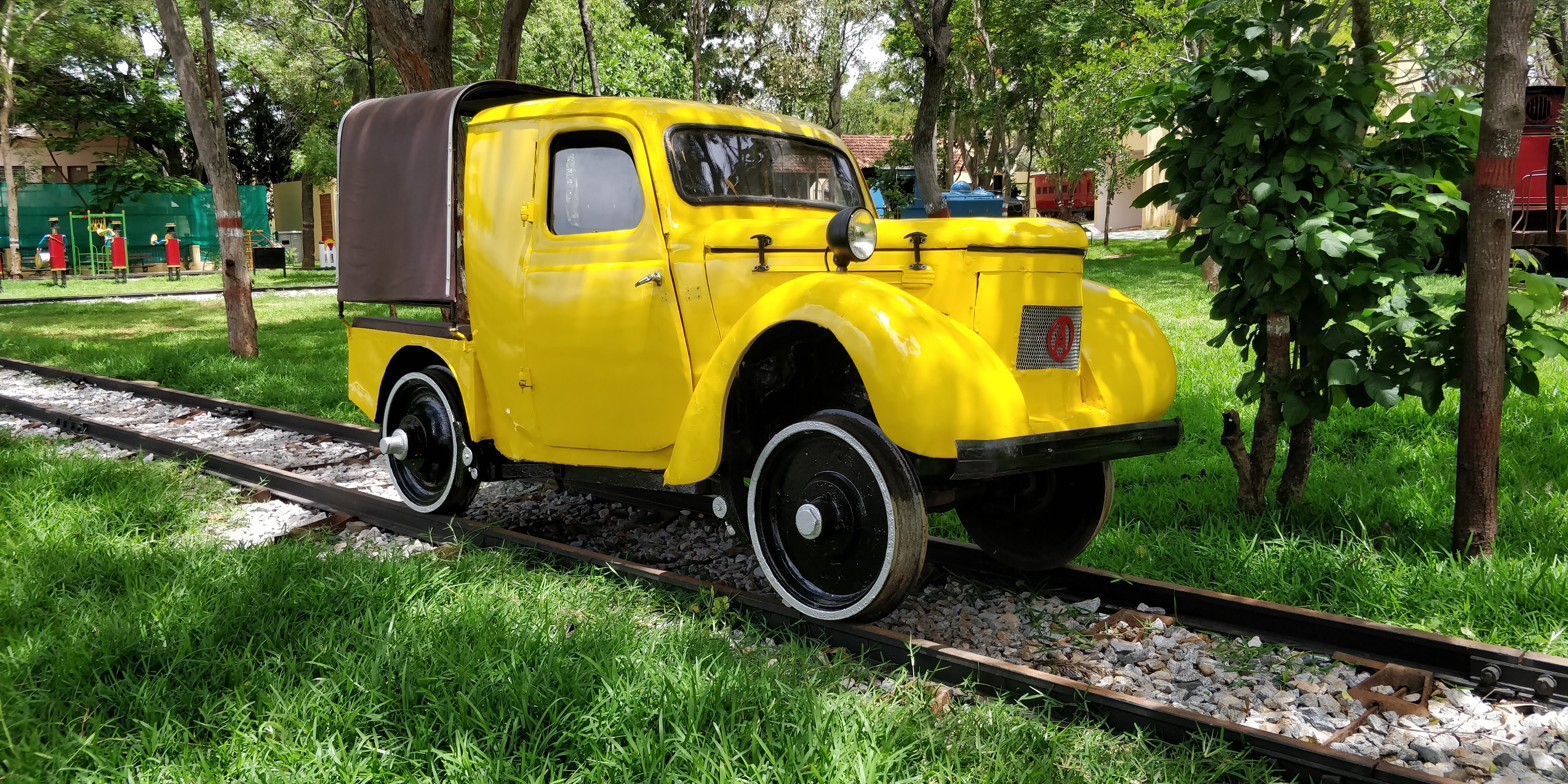

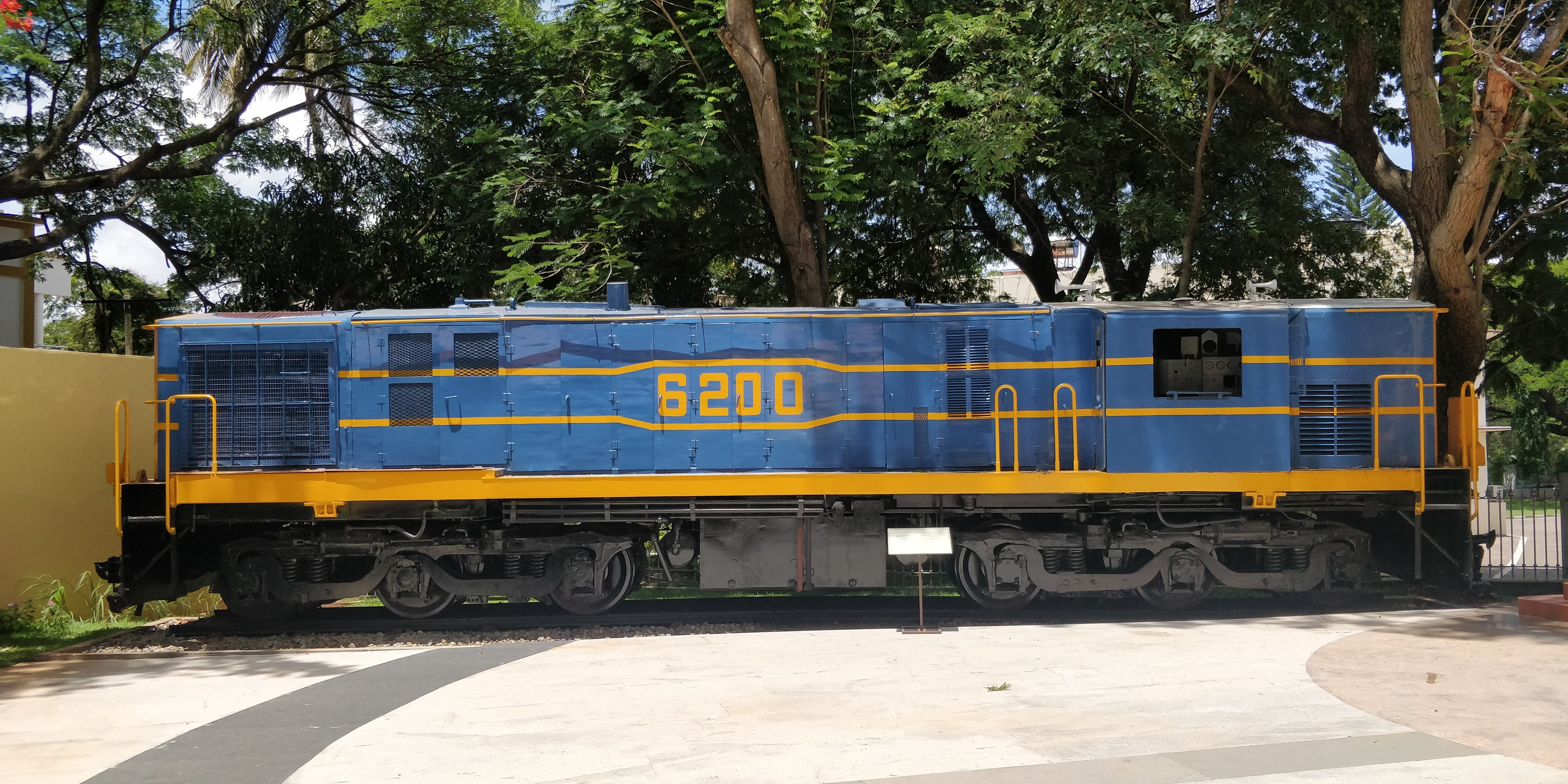

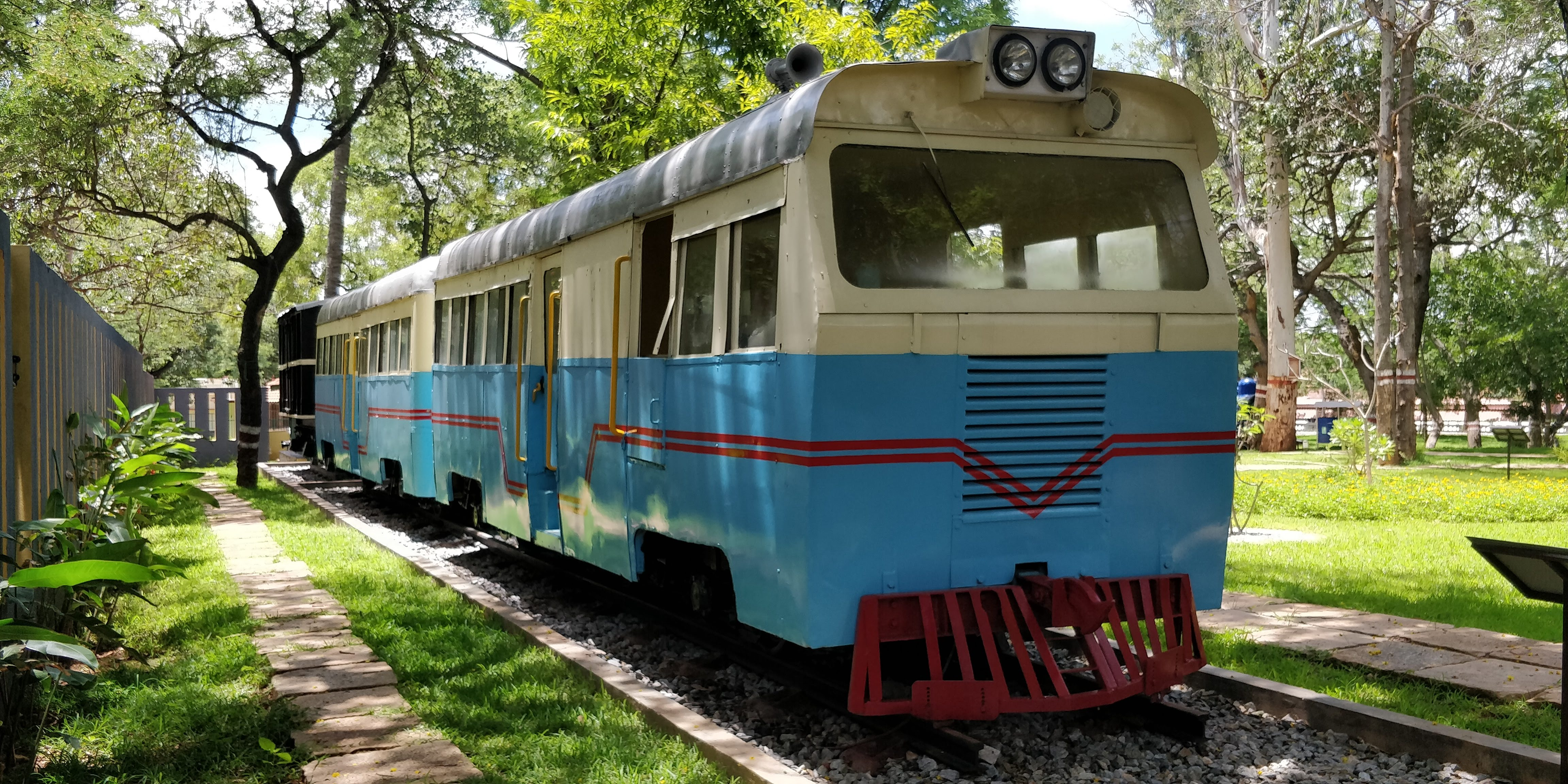

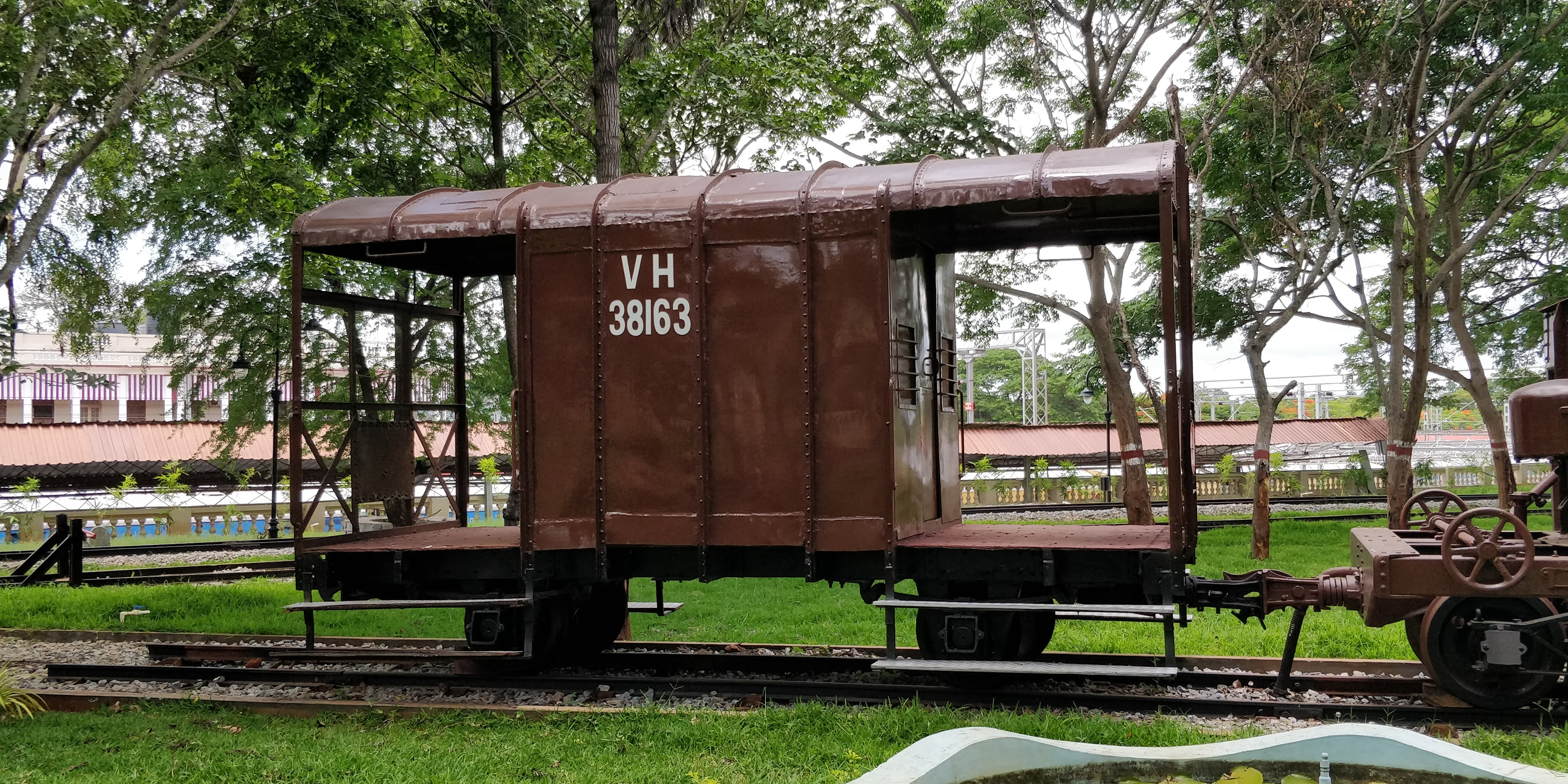

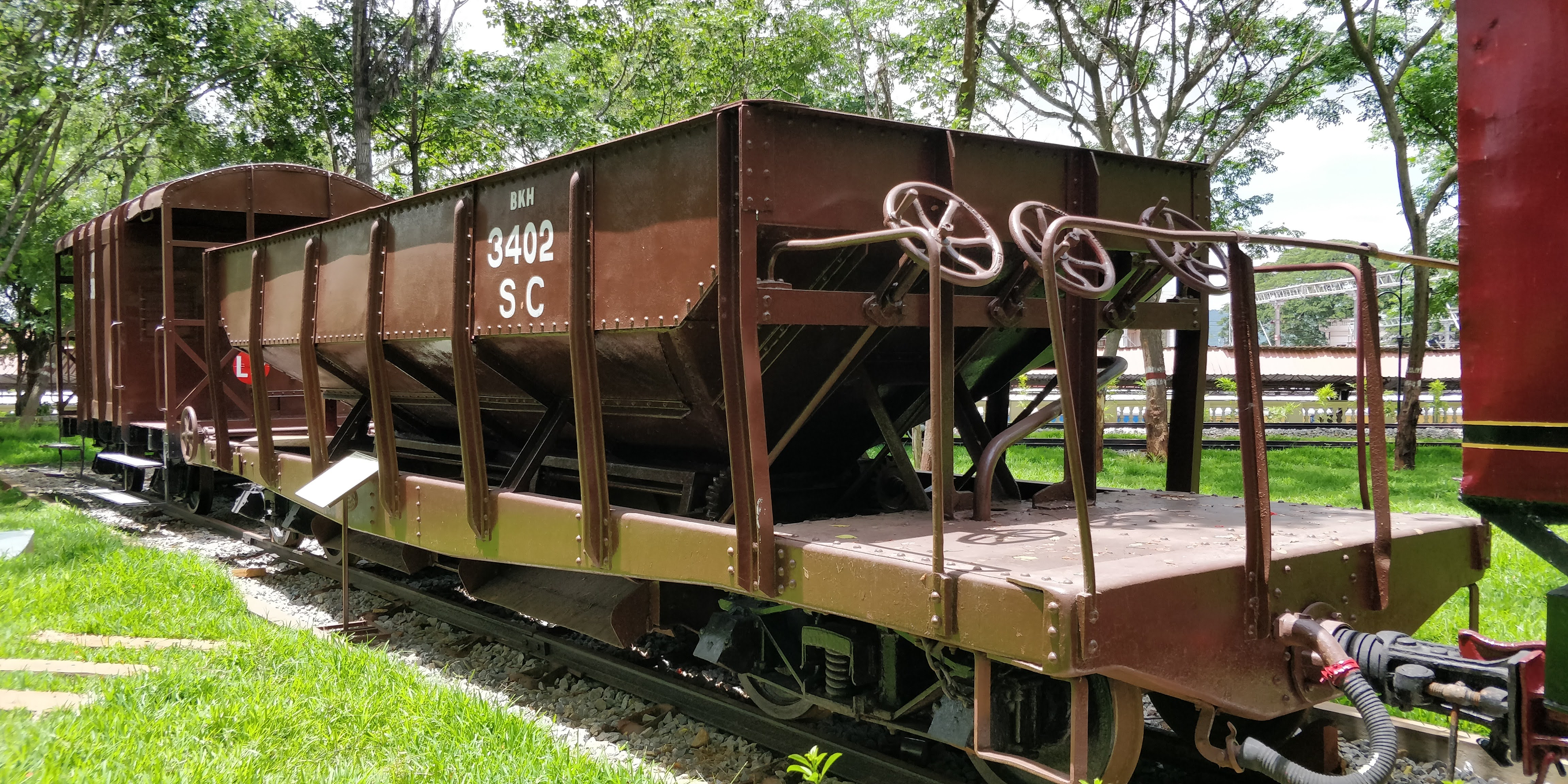

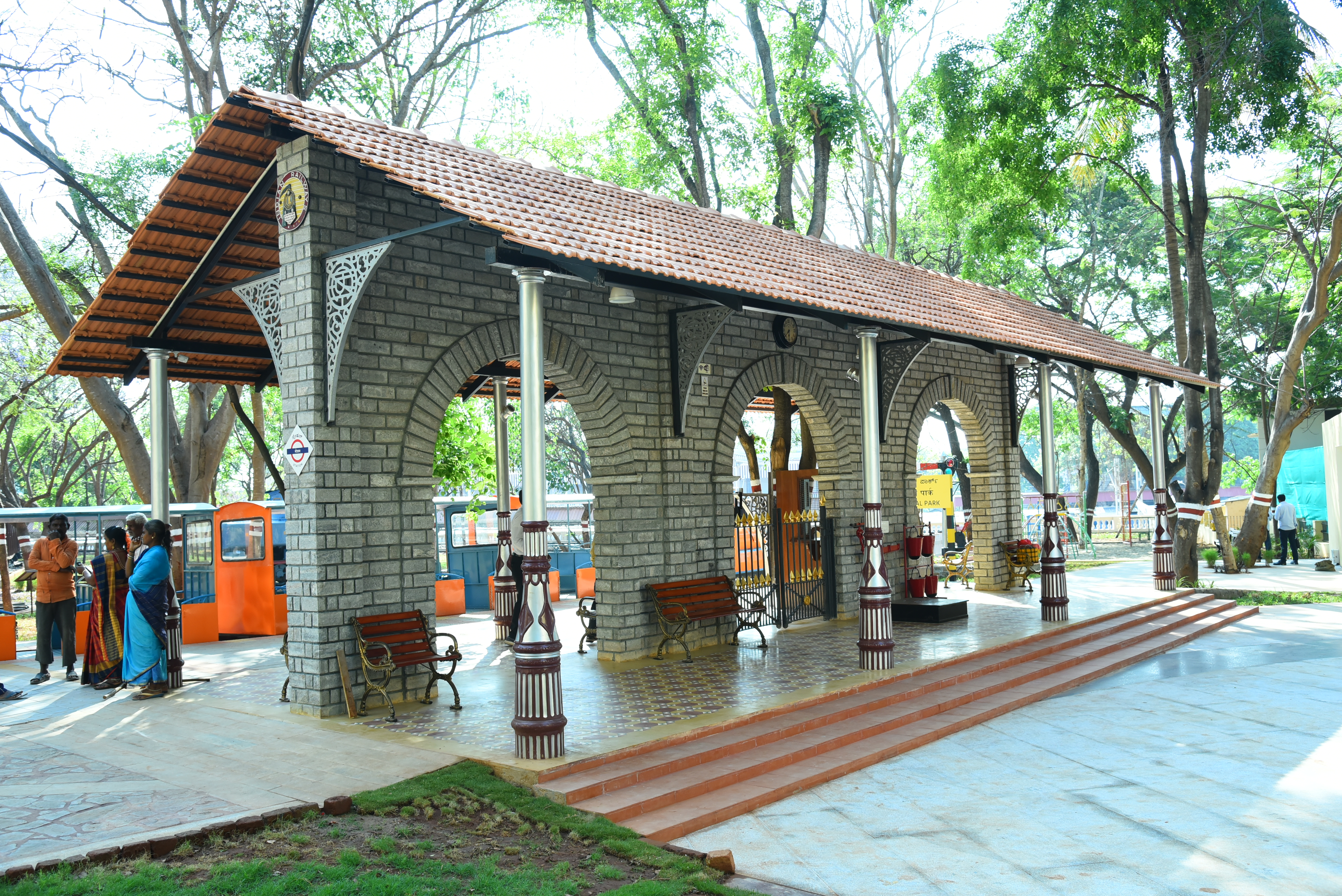

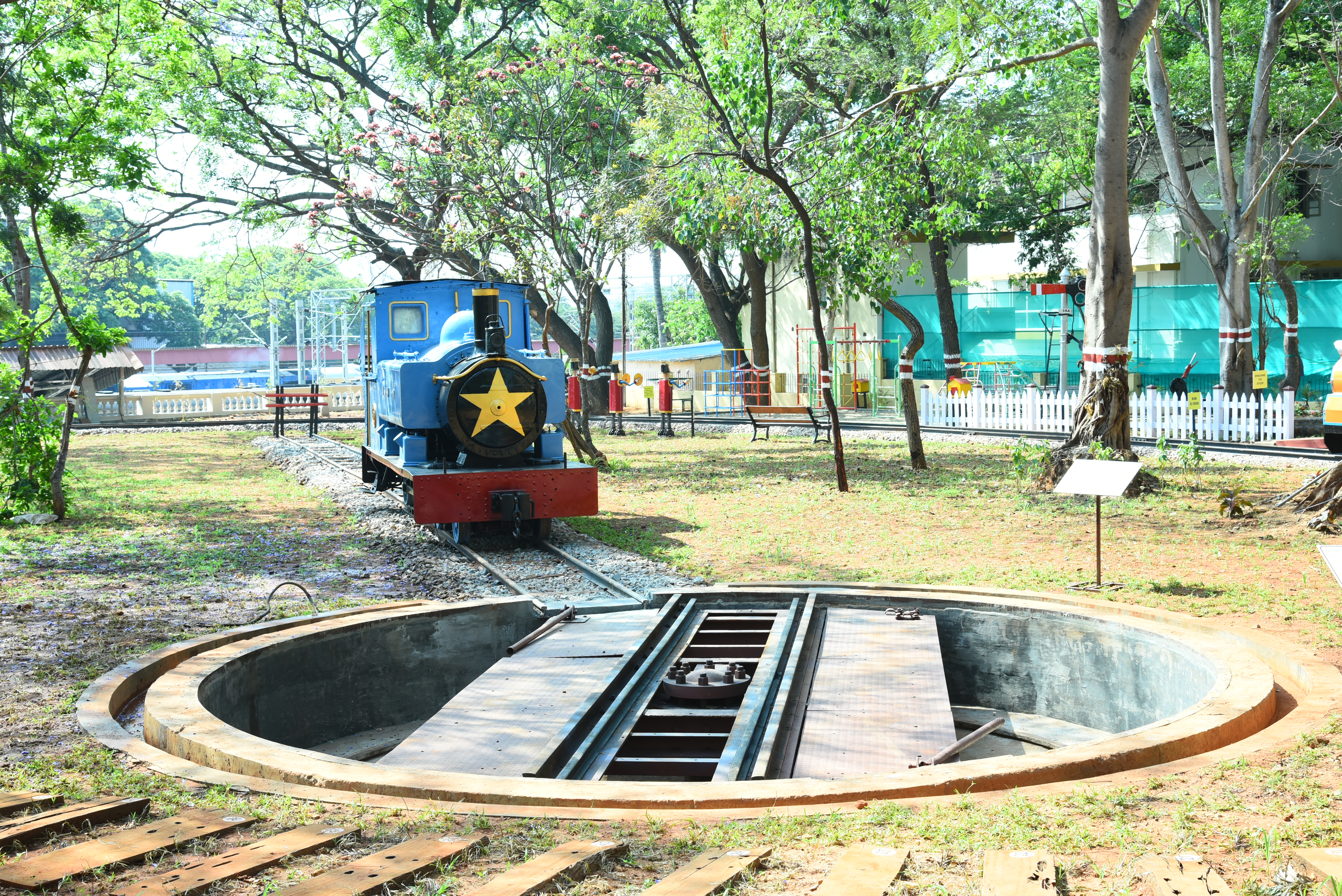

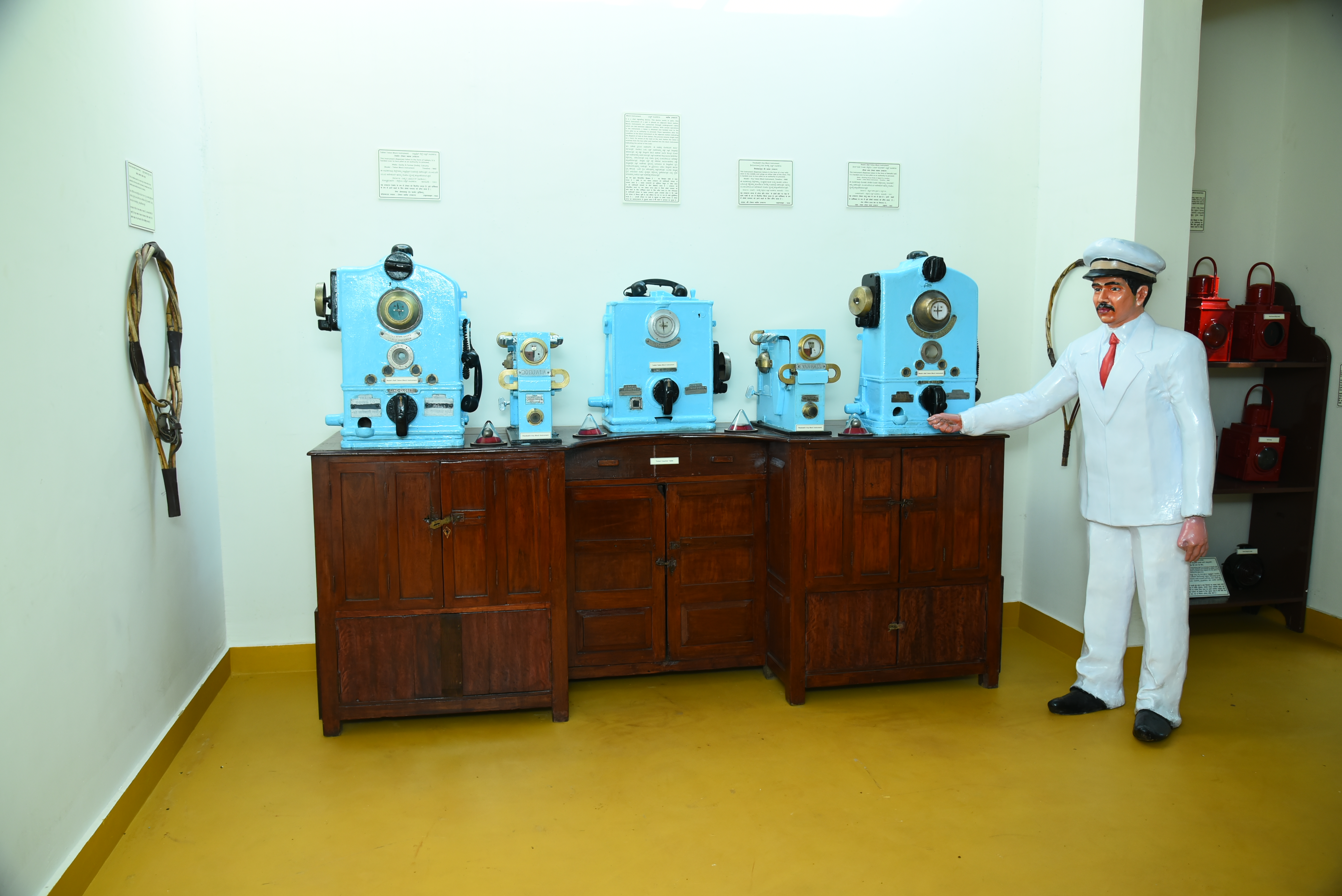

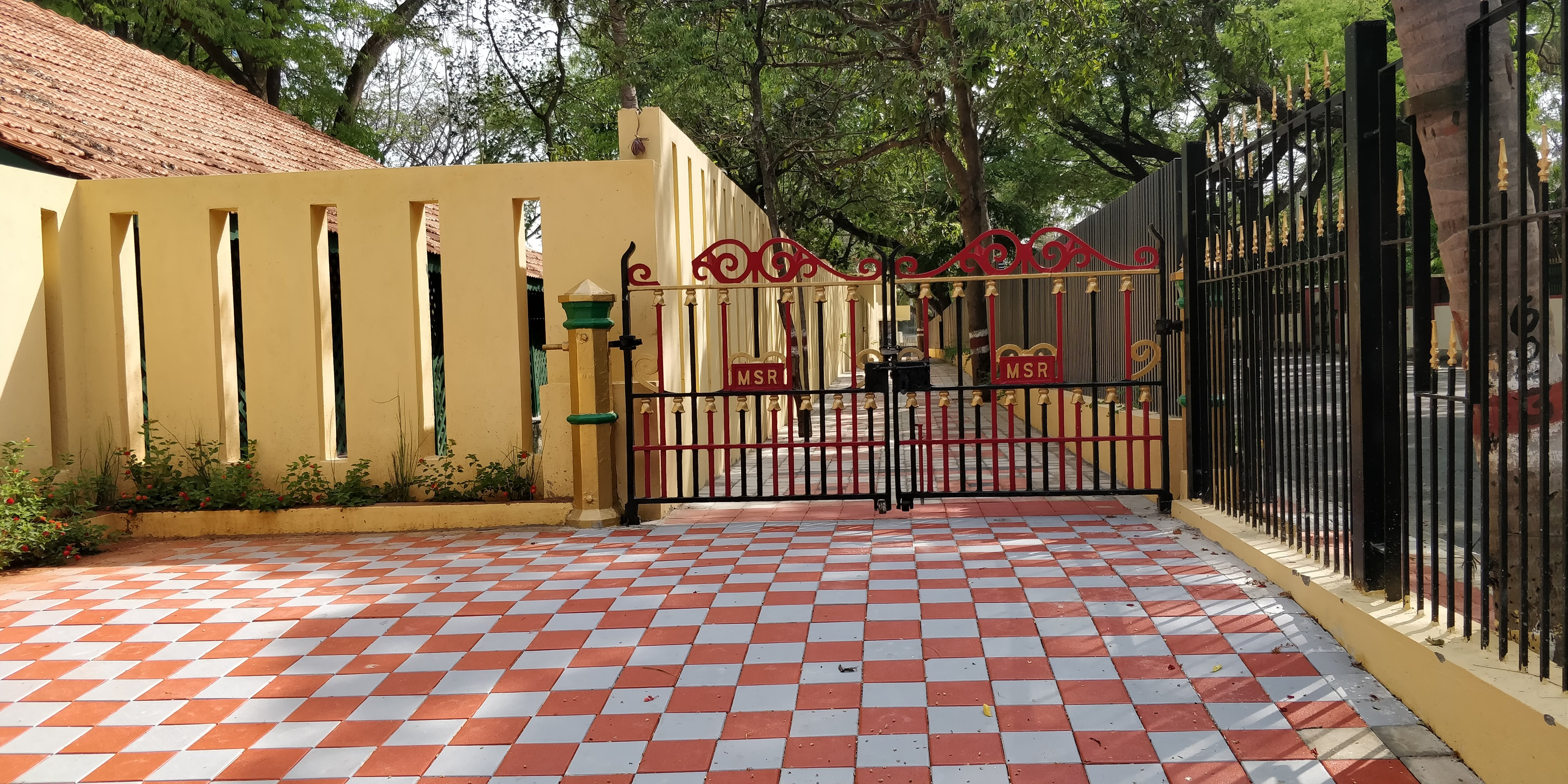

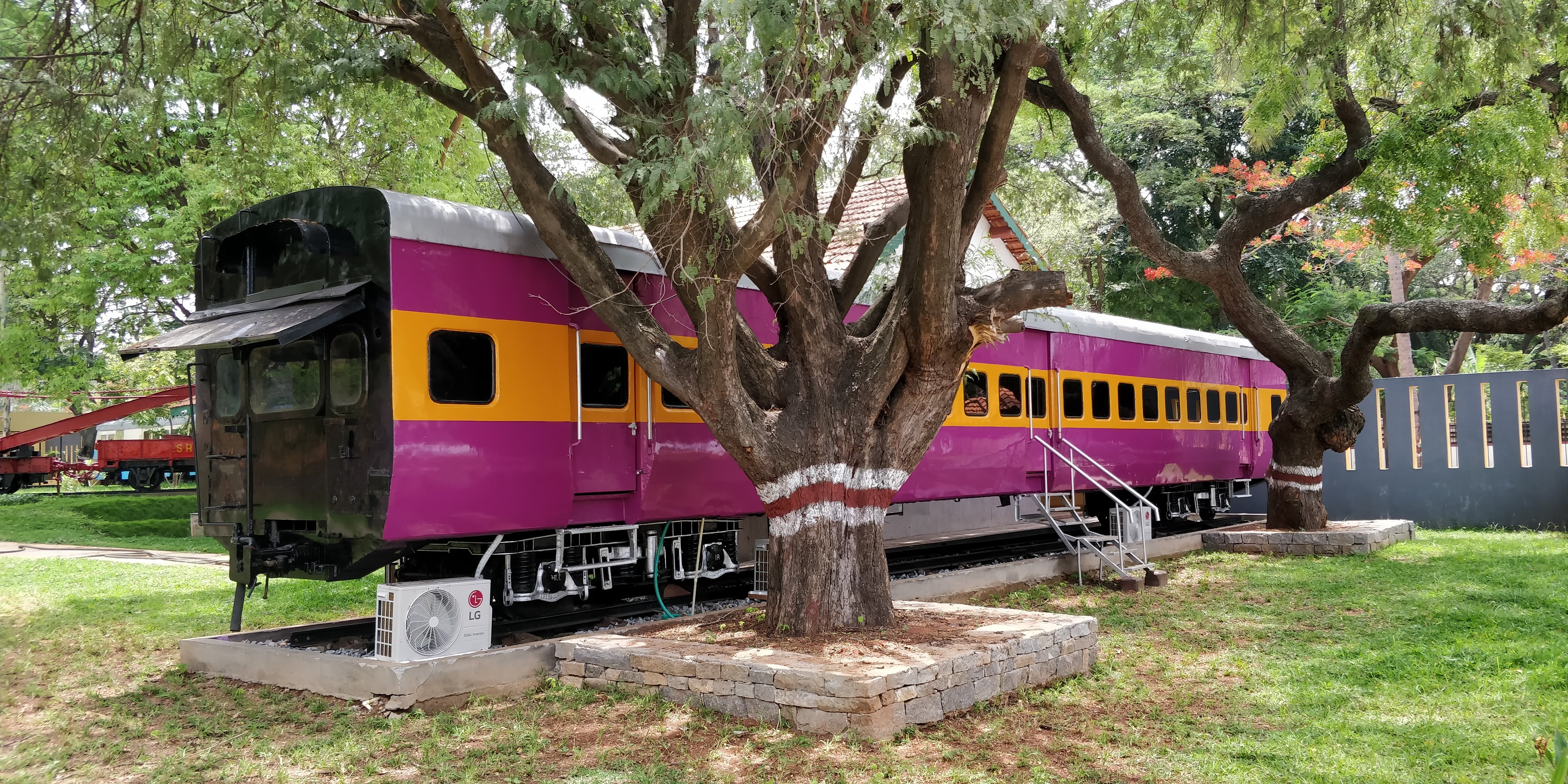

== See also ==
- National Rail Museum, New Delhi
- Rewari Railway Heritage Museum
- Regional Railway Museum, Chennai
- Railway Heritage Centre, Tiruchirappalli
- Joshi's Museum of Miniature Railway
- Rail Museum, Howrah
