= Rewari Railway Heritage Museum =

- रेवाड़ी रेल संग्रहालय
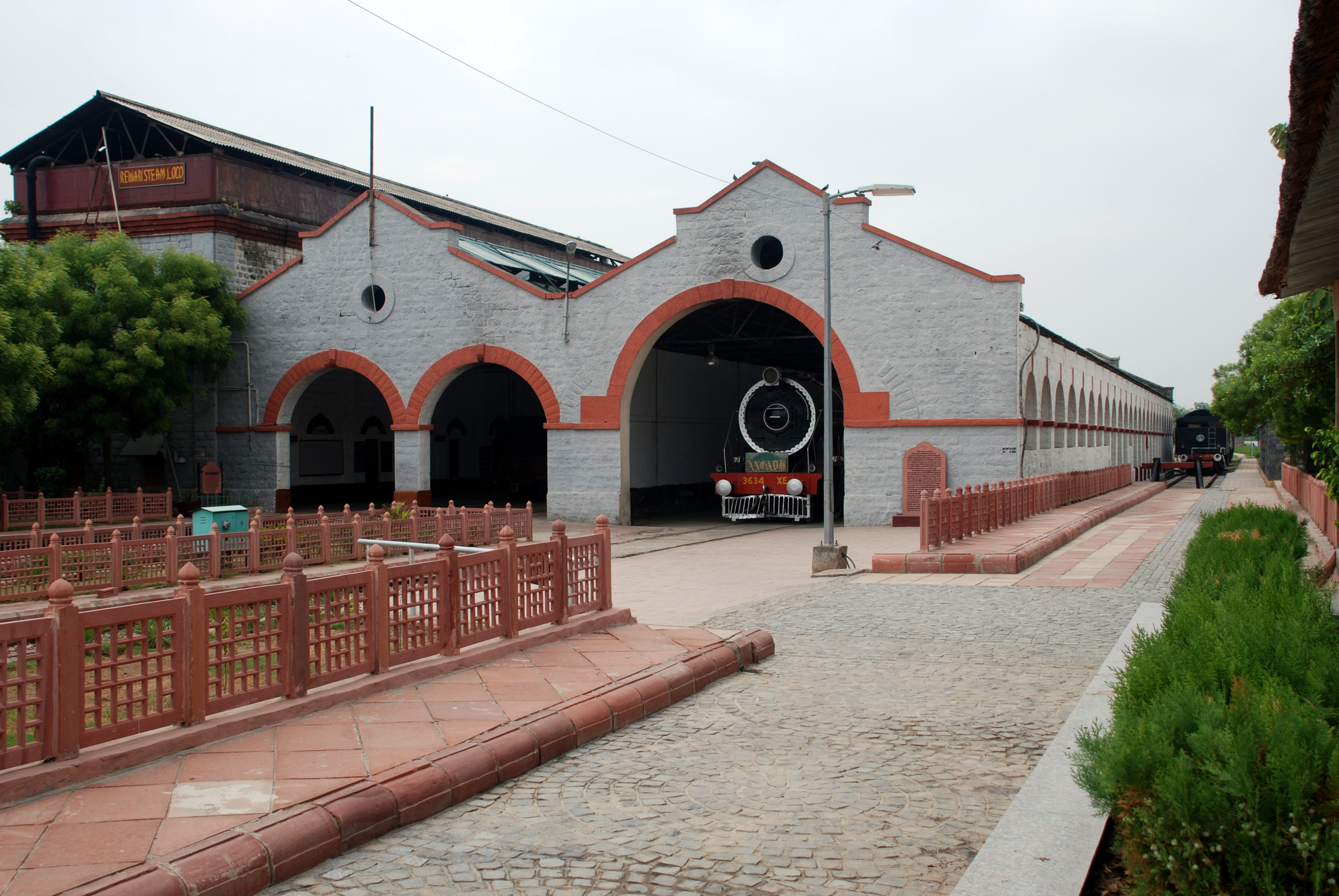
- Rewari Railway Heritage Museum

- Location in Rewari, India Rewari Railway Heritage Museum (India)
- Former name: Rewari Steam Locomotive Shed
- Established: 2 February 1893
- Location: North end of Rewari railway station, Rewari, Haryana, India
- Coordinates: 28.2085056°N 76.6120139°E
- Type: Railway museum
- Key holdings: Fairy Queen
- Collections: Steam locomotive
- Owner: Northern Railway zone of Indian Railways

The Rewari Railway Heritage Museum (formerly the Rewari Steam Locomotive Shed) is a railway museum in Delhi NCR at Rewari city in Haryana, India. Built in 1893, it is the only surviving steam locomotive shed in India, and houses some of India's last surviving steam locomotives, as well as the world's oldest still-functional 1855-built steam locomotive, the Fairy Queen. It is located 400 m (1,300 ft) north of the entrance of the Rewari railway station, 50 km (31 mi) from Gurgaon and 79 km (49 mi) from the National Rail Museum at Chanakyapuri in New Delhi.

== History ==
=== Steam locomotive shed ===
Built in 1893, the Rewari Steam Locomotive Shed was the only locomotive shed in North India for many years, and part of the railroad track connecting Delhi with Peshawar. After steam engines were phased out by the 1990s and steam traction on meter gauge tracks was discontinued in January 1994, the loco shed remained in neglect for many years before it was rehabilitated. The steam shed reopened in May 2002.

=== Heritage museum ===
The Rewari Steam Locomotive Shed was refurbished as a heritage tourism destination, its edifice restored, and a museum added by the Indian Railways in December 2002. The shed exhibited Victorian era artifacts used on the Indian rail network, along with the old signalling system, gramophones, and seats. The refurbished heritage museum was opened in October 2010. The engines are still available for live demonstrations.

== Exhibits ==
The shed and compound has 11 (of 16 functional in India) of the world's oldest steam locomotives, restored and still functional, including the following:

- Baldwin AWE, built by the American company Baldwin Locomotive Works in 1945
- Akbar WP1761, named after the Mughal Emperor, Akbar, built in 1963 at Chittaranjan Locomotive Works, was inducted into active service in 1965. It has a 4-6-2 wheel arrangement, 5 ft 6 in (1,676 mm) gauge and 110 km/h (68 mph) maximum speed now-restricted to 45 km/h (28 mph). The locomotive was based at Saharanpur railway shed after being retired from active service. It has been restored and housed at Rewari shed. It is now used to power the 150UP Delhi Cantt – Alwar Steam Express heritage train.
- Shahanshah WP/P is one of the original bullet-nosed American Baldwin prototype number 7200 Shahanshah, which was at the Charbagh workshops in Lucknow division. It was restored for use in steam specials by the Northern Railway. It has also run several steam specials, including one between Royapuram and Tambaram on 26 January 2009, to commemorate the 153rd anniversary of Royapuram railway station (built 1856), the oldest railway station in India. It ran the Steam Express on 14 January 2012. The engine is considered a lucky mascot for film shoots and is rented out at INR4 lakhs (INR400,000 or US$6,150) a day.

== Development plans ==
In January 2018, Indian Railway prepared a proposal to develop an 8.8 Hectare railway heritage theme park adjacent to the Rewari Rail Museum. It will be built in collaboration with the Government of Haryana and India's Ministry of Tourism based on a concept similar to the Devon Railway Centre in UK, the Edaville Railroad Theme Park in the USA and the Ferrymead Heritage Park in New Zealand. The Railway has asked the Haryana Government to include this heritage museum in the state subsidised "Swadesh Darshan scheme" under the under-development Madhogarh-Mahendragarh-Narnaul-Rewari heritage circuit of the Tourism Ministry being implemented at the cost of INR1.47 billion (INR147 crore or US$23 million).

The Indian National Trust for Art and Cultural Heritage (INTACH) has launched a drive to increase the awareness of this museum among the students.

== Facilities ==
The museum is open daily. It has a 3-D steam loco simulator simulating Darjeeling Himalayan Railway steam locomotive ride, 3-D virtual reality coach simulator, a toy train, educational yard model train system, an indoor exhibition gallery, a 35-seater conference room with projector, a century-old dining car, cafeteria and souvenir shop. In the museum, there are exhibit halls showing models of small engines, old railway equipment, hand-held brass signal lamps, and old photos. The facilities at the museum include 30 minute long documentaries and films shows, once or twice a day in museum's conference hall with a seating capacity of 50, about the history and present operations of railways in India.

The Fairy Queen steam locomotive ferries tourists from Delhi to Rewari every second Saturday from October to April.

== In popular culture ==
The Rewari steam locomotive shed has rented locomotives for various film shoots. Locomotives have appeared in films such as Barfi!, Guru, love aaj kal, Rang De Basanti and Veer-Zaara. The locomotive Akbar has featured in several movies shot here, including Gadar: Ek Prem Katha, Gandhi, My Father, Ki & Ka, Sultan, Gangs of Wasseypur, Qarib Qarib Singlle, Partition, and Pranayam, as well as the TV serial Ek Tha Chander Ek Thi Sudha.

== See also ==
- List of museums in Haryana
- National Rail Museum, New Delhi
- Regional Railway Museum, Chennai
- Railway Museum Mysore
- Railway Heritage Centre, Tiruchirappalli
- Joshi's Museum of Miniature Railway
