= Dashabhuja Ganapati Temple, Pune =

Dashabhuja Temple
- Location in Maharashtra. Dashabhuja Ganapati Temple, Pune (India)

Religion
- Affiliation: Hinduism
- District: pune
- Deity: Lord Ganapati

Location
- Location: Erandwane, Karve Road, Pune
- State: Maharashtra
- Country: India
- Interactive map of Dashabhuja Temple
- Coordinates: 18°30′20.80″N 73°49′32.88″E

Architecture
- Type: West Indian
- Creator: Unknown

The Dashabhuja Temple is a Hindu temple in Pune, in the Maharashtra state of India. This temple was once owned by Sardar Haripant Phadke, a Sardar of Peshwa and was later donated to the Peshwas as dowry. Dashabhuja Ganapati temple is visited by thousands of devotees every day and the number increases during Ganesh Chaturthi. The idol of Ganpati or Ganesh seen here has his elephant trunk resting on his right-hand side, which is supposed to be rarer and more sacred than other forms of the Ganesh idol.

== Details ==
The temple is located on Karve road, There is flyover at the juncture to facilitate the traffic going to Paud Road. Earlier there was no such flyover and the place was called Paud Phata. Paud is the name of the village on the western side on the road and "Phata" means diversion.

The presiding god of the temple is Lord Ganapati also known as Ganesh. The God is having trunk on the right which is more sacred. There is small temple of Lord Hanuman besides the main temple. Every "Ganesh Chaturthi" thousands of devotees come here to pray Lord Ganesha and participate in the evening "aarti".

== See also ==
- Ganesh Chaturthi
- Anant Chaturdashi
- Ganesh festival
- Cultural depictions of elephants

== Location ==
The temple is located alongside the Karve Nagar Road, in Pandurang Colony, Erandwane in Pune city in Maharashtra state of India. Pin code - 411004.
