= Railway Heritage Centre, Tiruchirappalli =

Railway Heritage Centre
- இரயில்வே பாரம்பரிய மையம்
- Established: 18 February 2014; 12 years ago
- Location: Near Rail Kalyana Mandapam (Community Hall); Tiruchirappalli Junction, Tiruchirappalli. PIN - 620 001
- Coordinates: 10.7967°N 78.6858°E
- Type: Heritage centre
- Accreditation: Ministry of Culture (India)
- Directors: Divisional Railway Manager, Tiruchirappalli railway division
- Owners: Southern Railway zone, Chennai
- Public transit access: Central Bus Stand; Tiruchirappalli Junction
- Parking: On site

The Railway Heritage Centre is a railway museum–cum–heritage centre for rail exhibits at Tiruchirappalli, Tamil Nadu, India.

== Overview ==
The museum was set up with initial funding of ₹1 crore (US$100,000) in order to preserve old artifacts and photographs, rare documents and equipment for posterity. In addition, it also provides interesting historic developments of the South Indian Railway Company and its timeline. In early 2013, the construction of the museum began at an area of 9,500 square feet (880 m^{2}), adjacent to the Rail Kalyana Mandapam (Community Hall), near Tiruchirappalli Junction, and was formally inaugurated on 18 February 2014 at a final cost of ₹1.5 crore (US$160,000).

== Exhibits ==
The museum which is a part of the erstwhile South Indian Railway’s sesquicentennial celebrations, and has both indoor and outdoor exhibits. Some of the indoor exhibits include old documents and digital archives (rare photographs, maps, gazettes, railway manuals and books used during the British Raj) and epoch artifacts (old lamps used at stations made up of "China glass", clocks, bells, staff badges, etc.). The outdoor exhibits include a couple of vintage locomotive engines and a functional toy train.

== Recreation ==
There are toy trains for the children, shady alcoves as well as local eateries.

== See also ==
- National Rail Museum, New Delhi
- Rewari Railway Heritage Museum
- Regional Railway Museum, Chennai
- Railway Museum Mysore
- Joshi's Museum of Miniature Railway
