= Fairy Queen (locomotive) =

1855-built steam locomotive in India

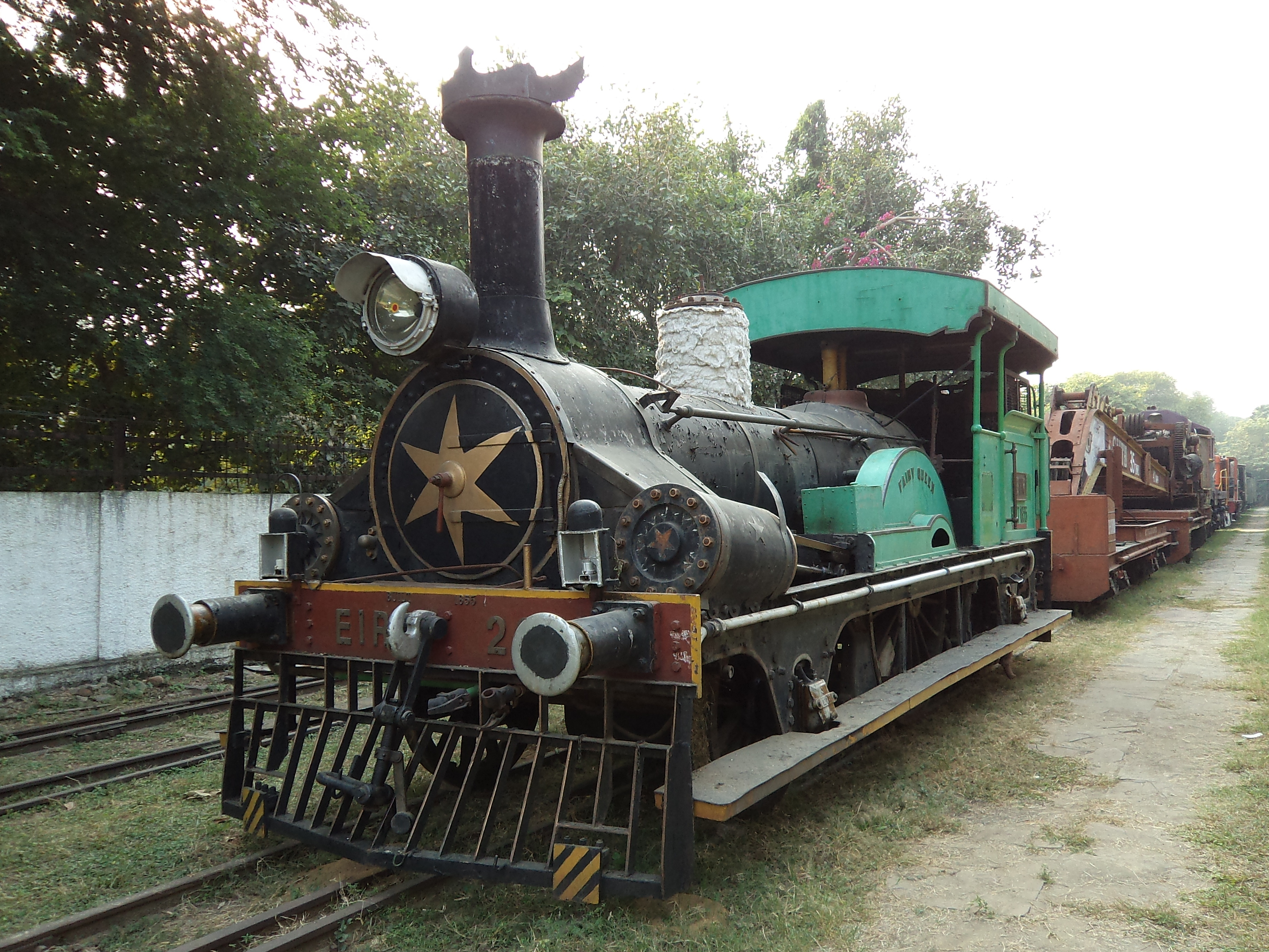
- The Fairy Queen in 2011, note the dual gauge
Type and origin
- Power type: Steam
- Builder: Kitson, Thompson and Hewitson
- Serial number: 481
- Build date: 1855; 171 years ago
Specifications
- Configuration
  - Whyte: 2-2-2WT
  - UIC: 1A1 n2t
- Gauge: 5 ft 6 in (1,676 mm)
- Driver dia.: 72 in (1,829 mm)
- Loco weight: 26 t (26 long tons; 29 short tons)
- Tender weight: 2 t (2.0 long tons; 2.2 short tons)
- Water cap.: 3,000 L (660 imp gal; 790 US gal)
- Cylinders: 2
- Cylinder size: 12 in × 22 in (305 mm × 559 mm)
Performance figures
- Maximum speed: 40 km/h (25 mph)
- Power output: 130 hp (97 kW)
Career
- Operators: East Indian Railway Company
- Numbers: 22
- Retired: 1909
- Restored: 18 July 1997
- Disposition: Operating from New Delhi, Delhi to Alwar, Rajasthan

The Fairy Queen, also known as the East Indian Railway No. 22, is a steam locomotive which was built in 1855. It was restored by Loco Works Perambur, Chennai in 1997, and housed at the Rewari Railway Heritage Museum.

The train occasionally runs between New Delhi and Alwar. In 1998 it was listed in the Guinness Book of Records as the world's oldest steam locomotive in regular service. The Fairy Queen runs on the same route as the Palace on Wheels, the tourist train launched in 1982, and was awarded the National Tourism Award in 1999.

The locomotive was built by Kitson, Thompson & Hewitson of England and worked on passenger and freight services for more than 55 years.

Unlike other luxury trains in India, the Fairy Queen has a total of only two coaches and a capacity of 50 passengers.

== History ==
The locomotive was constructed by Kitson, Thompson and Hewitson at Leeds, in England, in 1855, and reached Kolkata, then known as Calcutta, in the same year. On arrival, it was given fleet number "22" by its owner, the East Indian Railway Company; it was named in 1895. Initially, the 5 ft 6 in (1,676 mm) gauge locomotive was used to haul light mail trains in West Bengal, operating between Howrah and Raniganj, and during the Indian Rebellion of 1857 hauled troop trains. Subsequently, the train was consigned to a line construction duty in the state of Bihar, where it served until 1909.

The Fairy Queen spent the next 34 years on a pedestal outside Howrah station. In 1943, the locomotive was moved to the Railway Zonal Training School at Chandausi, in Uttar Pradesh, where it served as a curiosity object for many of the students based there.

=== Other contemporary locomotives ===
A number of similar locomotives were built around the same time as the Fairy Queen. These were supplied by Kitson, Thompson and Hewitson and also by Stothert, Slaughter and Company of Bristol. One of these, Stothert-built Express, had been preserved at Jamalpur Locomotive Workshop, in Bihar, since 1901. As the inscription on Express' pedestal claimed that it was the first locomotive to operate between Howrah and Raniganj, and it was numbered "21" by the East Indian Railway Company, it has been claimed that Express is the older of the two. Express was restored by Loco Works Perambur for running in 2011, making it a contender as the world's oldest operating steam locomotive. Express EIR 21 is currently running in different divisions of Southern Railway on weekends.

== Specifications ==
The Fairy Queen was built by Kitson, Thompson and Hewitson at Leeds in England in 1855. The coal-fired engine is powered by two outside cylinders measuring 12 by 22 inches (305 mm × 559 mm), and has a power output of 130 horsepower (97 kW), producing a maximum speed of 40 kilometres per hour (25 mph). It carries 3,000 litres (660 imp gal; 790 US gal) of water in an underslung water tank. The locomotive weighs 26 tonnes (25.6 long tons; 28.7 short tons), and the coal tender 2 tonnes (1.97 long tons; 2.20 short tons). Built for the 5 ft 6 in (1,676 mm) broad gauge, it has a 2-2-2 wheel arrangement, developed by Robert Stephenson and Company in 1833, with a driving wheel measuring 1,829 millimetres (72.0 in) in diameter.

== Restoration ==
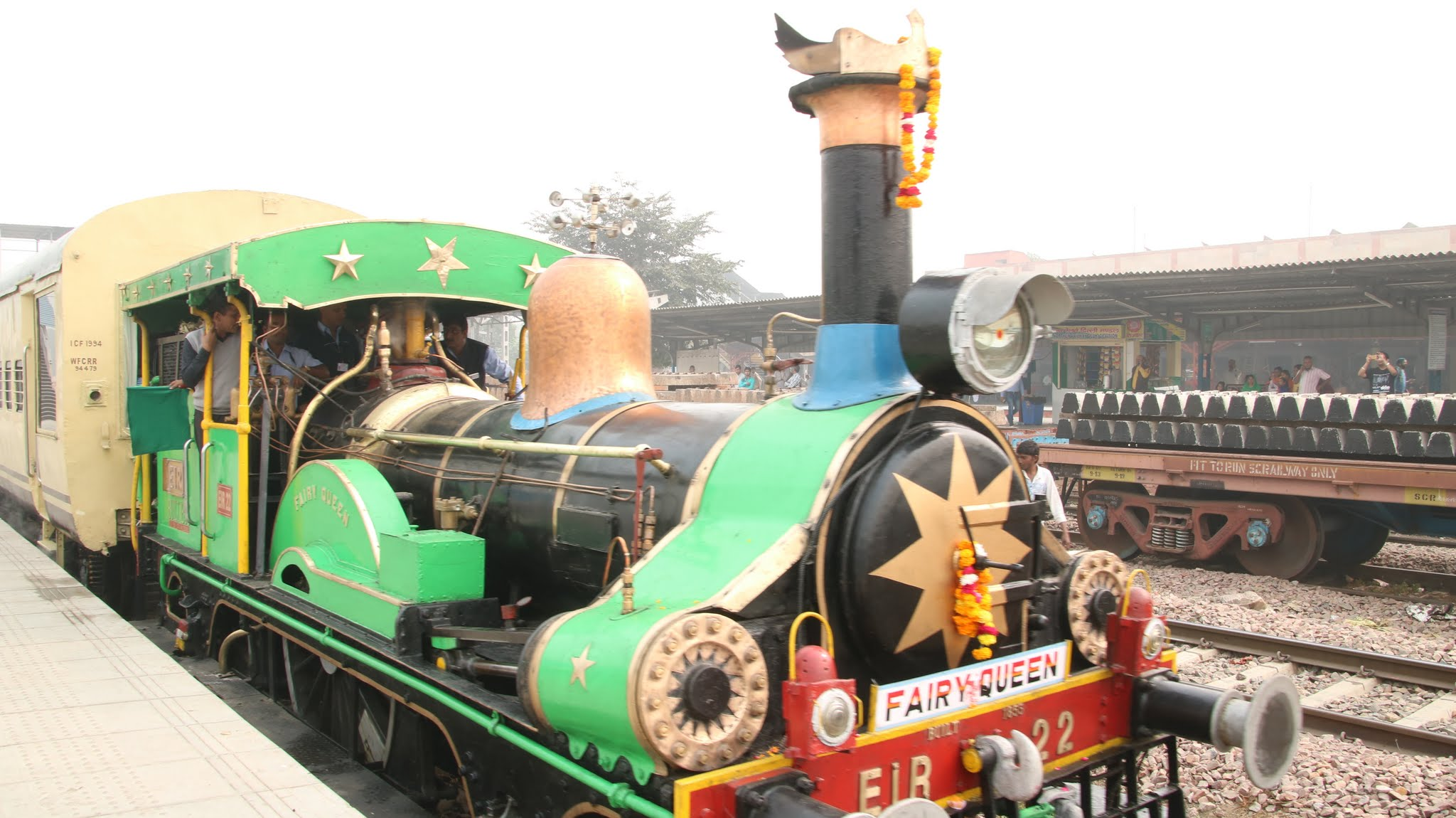
Fairy Queen after restoration, Delhi Cantonment station, 2017

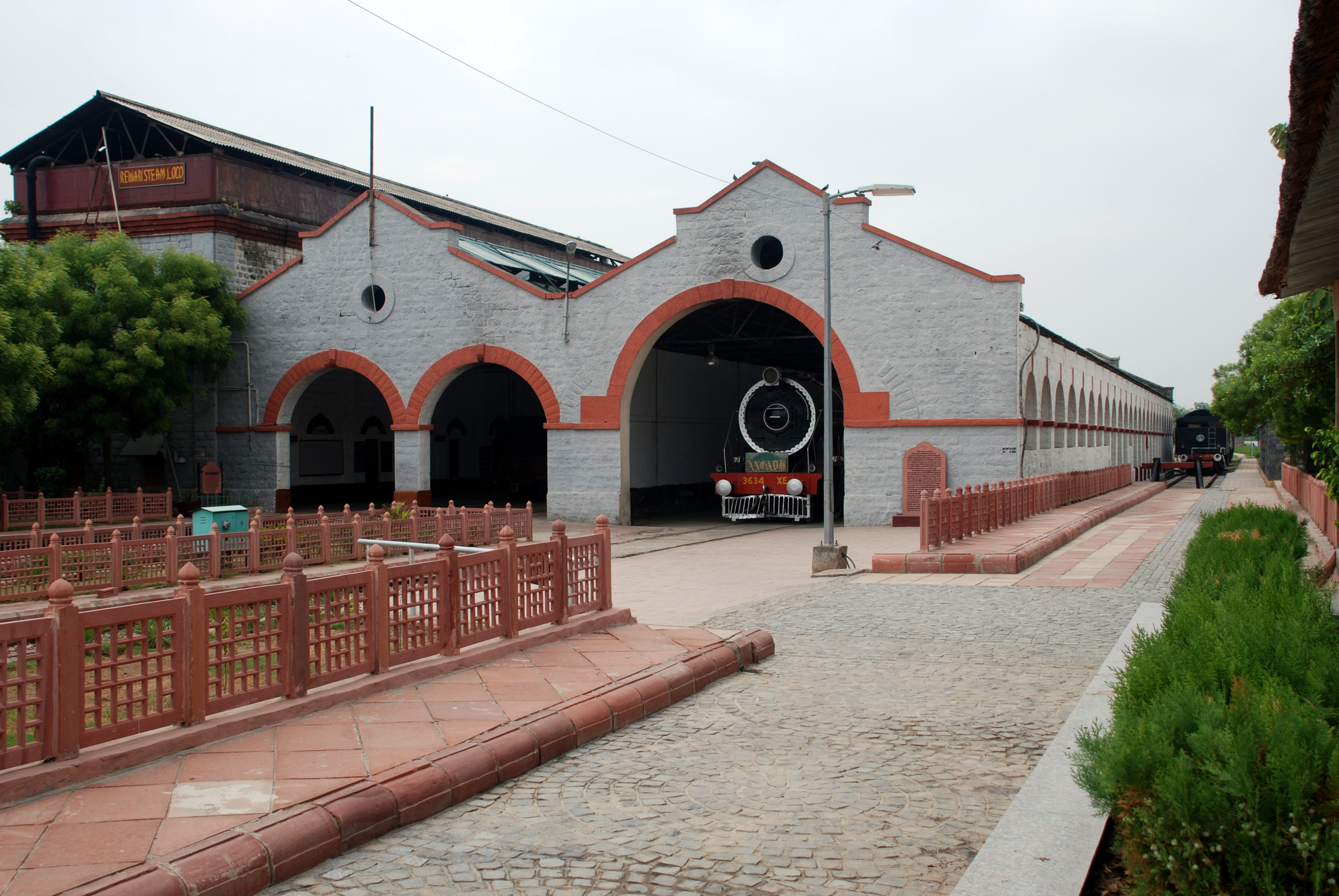
Rewari Railway Heritage Museum (formerly Rewari Steam Locomotive Shed) is the home of the Fairy Queen.

The Indian government bestowed heritage status on the Fairy Queen in 1972, rendering it a national treasure. It was restored and given a special spot in the newly built National Rail Museum at Chanakyapuri, in New Delhi, which offers a comprehensive history of the Indian railway's defunct and operational models, their signalling apparatus, antique furnitures used, historic photographs, relevant literature, etc.

Following the success of the Palace on Wheels, the locomotive was restored to full working order in 1997, in preparation for its first mainline journey in 88 years and its return to commercial service on 18 July. The two-day excursion saw the train plying the 143 kilometres (89 mi) from New Delhi to Alwar in Rajasthan, with passengers spending an overnight stay at the Sariska Tiger Reserve. The locomotive hauled a carriage capable of carrying 60 passengers at a maximum speed of 40 kilometres per hour (25 mph), with a service car holding a generator, compressor and pantry. The operation was repeated between December and February in the following years. It was certified by the Guinness Book of Records in 1998 as the world's oldest steam locomotive in regular operation. The following year, the train received a National Tourism Award for the most innovative and unique tourism project from Atal Bihari Vajpayee, the then Prime Minister of India.

In 2011, it was discovered that rare locomotive parts that were "as good as irreplaceable" had been stolen, and the locomotive was moved to Perambur Loco Workshop at Chennai, in Tamil Nadu, for repair. On arrival, it was found that an estimated 50 to 60 parts had been looted, including "the boiler, condensor, lubricator and flow tubes". The deputy chief mechanical engineer at the workshops stated "What we received is a dead body, a piece of metal whose every removable part has been removed, leaving only the metal shell. The list of parts to be procured is huge." Officials estimated that it could take at least a year to restore the engine, even if suppliers of replacement parts could be found. Following a substantial rebuild, in which the workshops had to construct the missing parts themselves, the locomotive returned to service on 22 December 2012.

== Recognition ==
In 1998, the train was certified by the Guinness Book of Records as the world's oldest steam locomotive which was currently in regular operation.

In 1999, it received a National Tourism Award for the most innovative and unique tourism project from the then prime minister of India, Atal Bihari Vajpayee.

== In fiction ==
- The locomotive served as the basis for Rajiv from Thomas and Friends.
- The locomotive appears in the game Roller Coaster Tycoon 3's Wild Expansion Pack.

== See also ==
- Luxury rail in India
