= Joshi's Museum of Miniature Railway =

- Location within Maharashtra
- Established: 1998 (present building)
- Location: Erandwane, Pune, Maharashtra, India
- Coordinates: 18.50163°N 73.822213°E
- Type: Transport museum
- Website: www.minirailways.com

Joshi's Museum of Miniature Railway is a miniature railway museum located in the Erandwane locality of Pune, a city in the state of Maharashtra, India. The museum hosts working models of various types of trains. It was started by Bhausaheb Joshi.

== History ==
The museum was conceptualized and started by B. S. Joshi, popularly known as Bhausaheb Joshi. Through his childhood hobby of collecting and making models, he started working on this concept in the 1960s. He initially made mobile working models, which he would set up in various cities for the public to view. His first exhibition took place in Pune at the Gokhale Hall in 1982. In 1984 the layout was displayed in Mumbai (then Bombay) and again in 1986, in Pune's Dastur High School. It was then that Joshi decided to have a permanent exhibition to avoid the inconveniences of mobile models. The present layout of the museum was fabricated in 1991 and the museum opened on 1 April 1998. Over time the layout was enlarged with many additions of digital controls and multiple models. The museum's present proprietor is Dr. Ravi Joshi, Bhausaheb's son.

== On exhibit ==
The model trains on exhibition run through a miniature city and are presented with a son et lumière show. The layout includes 65 signals, fences, lamp posts, flyovers, etc. and can be controlled manually as well as through a computer. In 2011 it has working models of "10 - 15" types of trains, including steam engines, the bullet train and a mini sky-train.

In 2003, the museum developed a miniature railway that interacts with other equipment and simulates train movements. This project, the first of its kind in India, was executed for HBLnife, a company that manufactures and supplies batteries, high-frequency track circuit data loggers, digital axle counters and electronic interlocking systems to the Indian Railways. The model is the first ever scale model in India that is digitally controlled and can simulate movements of trains.

Since 2003, the museum is an India distributor for international brands such as Fleischmann, Roco and Hornby Railways that make scale models of railways. "Trainz", the hobby centre of the museum intends, according to Ravi Joshi, to popularize train modelling and impart basic knowledge about it. Currently the charges for the individual consist of Rs 90 for an individual, kids below 3 years are not charged. The museum also has its own manufacturing unit. The museum sells miniature railway kits on site and also supplies models to Switzerland, Australia and the Indian Railways. In 2007 it manufactured a scale model of the Jungfrau Railway, Europe's highest railway, and received an order for 2000 sets, which will be sold at the stations of the railway. The models are made by the injection moulding process.

The museum is included in the attractions covered by the Pune Municipal Corporation's one-day city tour bus. The road on which the museum is located has been named after Bhau Joshi .

== See also ==
- National Rail Museum, New Delhi
- Rewari Railway Heritage Museum
- Regional Railway Museum, Chennai
- Railway Museum Mysore
- Railway Heritage Centre, Tiruchirappalli
