= Chennai Rail Museum =

Rail museum in Tamil Nadu, India

- Location in Chennai
- Former name: Regional Rail Museum, Chennai
- Established: 2002
- Location: Perambur, Chennai, Tamil Nadu 600 038, India
- Coordinates: 13.1006076°N 80.2071805°E
- Type: Rail museum
- Visitors: 7,500 per month
- Public transit access: Villivakkam railway station, Anna Nagar Tower Park metro station, ICF Bus Stand
- Website: Official site

The Chennai Rail Museum is a railway museum in Chennai, Tamil Nadu, India. The museum opened on 16 April 2002 in the Furnishing Division of the Integral Coach Factory (ICF) near Perambur. The 6.25-acre (2.53 ha) museum has technical and heritage exhibits, with a sizable collection of steam engines from the British Raj. It also has vintage coaches (such as Ooty trains), which were endemic on Indian railways. Most of the older models were manufactured by the North British Locomotive Company, with some trains in the collection dating back more than a century. Toy-train rides are available. There are 3 air-conditioned Indoor Galleries (ICF Gallery, Rail History Gallery, Art Gallery, 2 Other Non-airconditioned Galleries, a 90-seater air-conditioned Dolby Digital Movie Theatre (Railway and Railway Heritage Films), Natyarangam, Amphitheatre, a Number of Metal Sculptures made from scrap, 3D MURAL at the entrance, Cartoon Hero Characters better viewed from the Joyous Toy Train Ride, Rail Coach Restaurant, Eco Green Park, Lust Green vegetation, etc., The museum is managed and maintained by the ICF.

== Location ==
It is located in Perambur area, which is renowned for its Integral Coach Factory. 71 series buses connects Rail museum to prominent places like Broadway, Chennai Central, Chennai Egmore, Kilpauk, Ambattur and Avadi.

== History ==
The Regional Rail Museum (RRM, its original name) was established in March 2002. The Railway Board had a strong interest in its development, since it would be a model for other RRMs planned for Kolkata and Pune. The Chennai museum was first proposed in a 1993-94 suggestion by the Railway Board secretary to the ICF general manager, followed by meetings between the museum's future director and the ICF CE. It was inaugurated by Railway Minister Nitish Kumar on March 31, 2002, and opened to the public on April 16. The RRM was renamed the Chennai Rail Museum to commemorate the 377th Madras Day on August 22, 2016. The renovated museum, with a new Art gallery, was inaugurated on October 2, 2016 by Padma Bhushan recipient Padma Subrahmanyam in the presence of artist Manian Selvan and ICF General Manager S. Mani.

== Overview ==
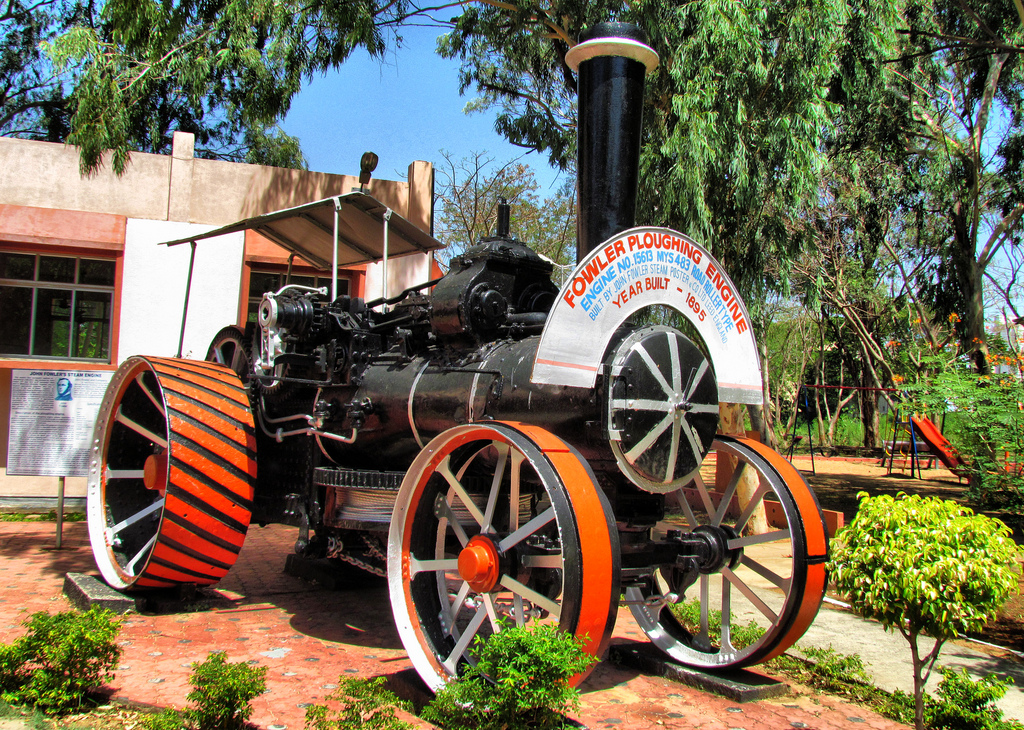
1895 Fowler ploughing engine at the museum

The 6.5-acre (2.6 ha) museum has two galleries, a number of 19th-century outdoor heritage exhibits, a toy train that takes visitors around the perimeter, and a playground. Its collection includes indoor and outdoor exhibits. The indoor galleries contain photographs detailing the early years of the ICF and Indian Railways. The museum also houses working scale models of trains, and rare colonial-period artifacts. This will be the location of new exhibits for the museum's second decade. A video about Neal's ball token system (which provided signaling between trains) is featured, as well as a coach in which Mahatma Gandhi traveled.

The museum's outdoor exhibits include 41 train models. An 1895 model of a Fowler steam ploughing engine (manufactured by John Fowler) and 1860s double-deck coaches are on display. Models include Coach of Inspection car RA 30 (manufactured by Metropolitan Carriage and Finance), Crane Hercules (used for emergency relief) and luxury coaches. Nearly all of the museum's coaches are accessible to visitors.

The exhibits are interspersed with posters of high-speed trains from around the world, the history of Indian Railways and models of coaches made for Sri Lanka, the Philippines, Vietnam and Zambia. They also include a coach from the Mumbai suburban train network, old railway maps of India, century-old clocks, and a diesel-locomotive engine block. Outdoor exhibits include life-size models of a Nilgiri Mountain Railway coach, a GM inspection car, an MG EMU, a hospital van, a hand-operated crane, an overhead equipment car, a meter gauge EMU, and a variety of engines (steam, diesel and plough).

The museum also contains photographs of visits to ICF by world leaders, royalty, and other dignitaries. The model trains run on three tiers, and over 150 photographs document the history of ICF and Indian Railways.

The ICF Diamond Jubilee Gallery has photographs by Ian Manning which were digitally restored, including one of a steam-engine turntable. It also has a first-class compartment seat, a scale model of third-class MG coaches designed and manufactured at ICF for Uganda, and photographs of dignitaries such as Queen Elizabeth II, K. Kamaraj, and Prime Minister Jawaharlal Nehru. An art gallery contains over a dozen paintings. The paintings, by artists such as M. S. Murthy and Shahid Pasha, illustrate subjects commonly found in railway stations and related establishments. Murthy's Gandhi, is a tribute to the man and his philosophy. In Pasha's Kanhaiya's Journey, a young Krishna showing his mother Yashoda the way home as she pulls a suitcase and tries to board the Mathura Express at the Bangalore railway station. The painting demonstrates that one's god (or gods) are not restricted to temples, but are present everywhere to provide guidance.

An antique steam engine which once operated in the Nilgiri Mountains is at the museum entrance, and the space surrounding it is decorated with greenery and herbs. A walking path helps visitors get close to the antique train.

== Visitors ==
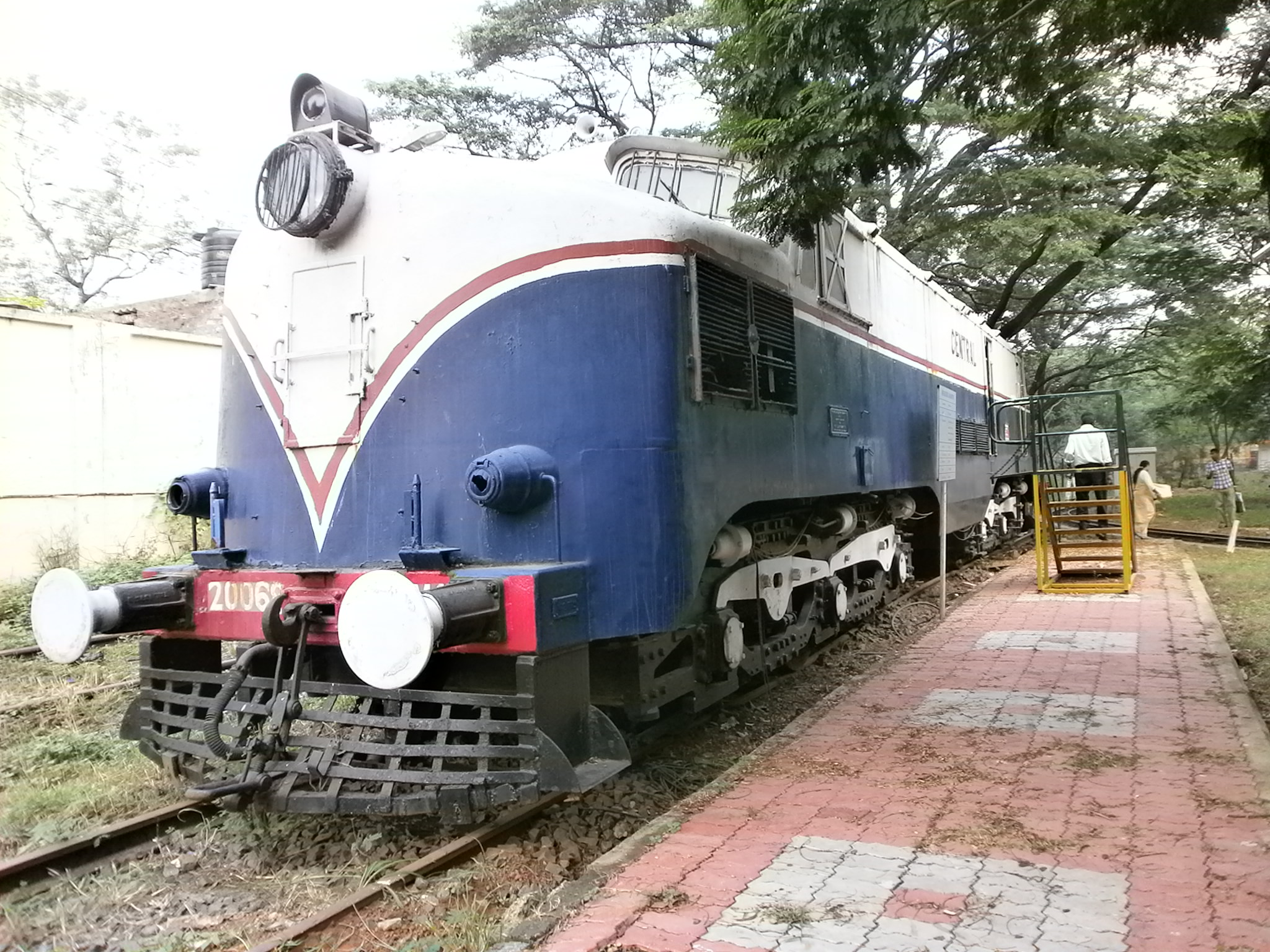
Engine on display at the museum

The museum was established to showcase the Heritage of Indian Railways. Work on it began in 2001, and the museum was inaugurated in March 2002 by Railway Minister Nitish Kumar. Several additions have been made since then, and the museum constructed a train ride for children. Although nearly 5,500 people visit the museum each month (primarily students and local residents), the railway struggles with a lack of awareness and publicity despite its role in India's growth. During 10th-anniversary celebrations in 2012, the museum announced plans for expansion. In August 2017, 14,792 people visited the museum (up from 10,809 visitors in August 2016). Many visitors complain that the museum deserves better facilities and clean pathways. Many heritage models are desperate for painting.

== Restaurant ==
On August 31, 2018, a rail coach-themed restaurant opened at the museum. The air-conditioned Chennai Express restaurant is inside a Linke Hoffman Busch train coach provided by the ICF. It is the second such restaurant opened in the country by the IR, following one in Bhopal (2015). The restaurant offers Chinese, continental, North- and South-Indian cuisine.

The area leading to the coach entrance was designed to resemble a railway platform. The restaurant can seat 64 people at tables in the coach and on the platform. The coach's interior was designed to resemble the Maharajas' Express and the Deccan Odyssey. Its adjacent kitchen is a repurposed shipping container. The coach's exterior was painted by Asma Menon and a team of artists.

== Theater ==
The museum opened a small 90-seater, Digital Dolby, Large Screen, air-conditioned theater on August 15, 2018. The theater, with a capacity of 90 people, to showcase films about the Integral Coach Factory, Indian Railways, World Railway and Railway Heritage clippings to museum visitors.

== See also ==
- National Rail Museum, New Delhi
- Rewari Railway Heritage Museum
- Railway Museum Mysore
- Railway Heritage Centre, Tiruchirappalli
- Joshi's Museum of Miniature Railway
