= Amit Puri =

Indian chef

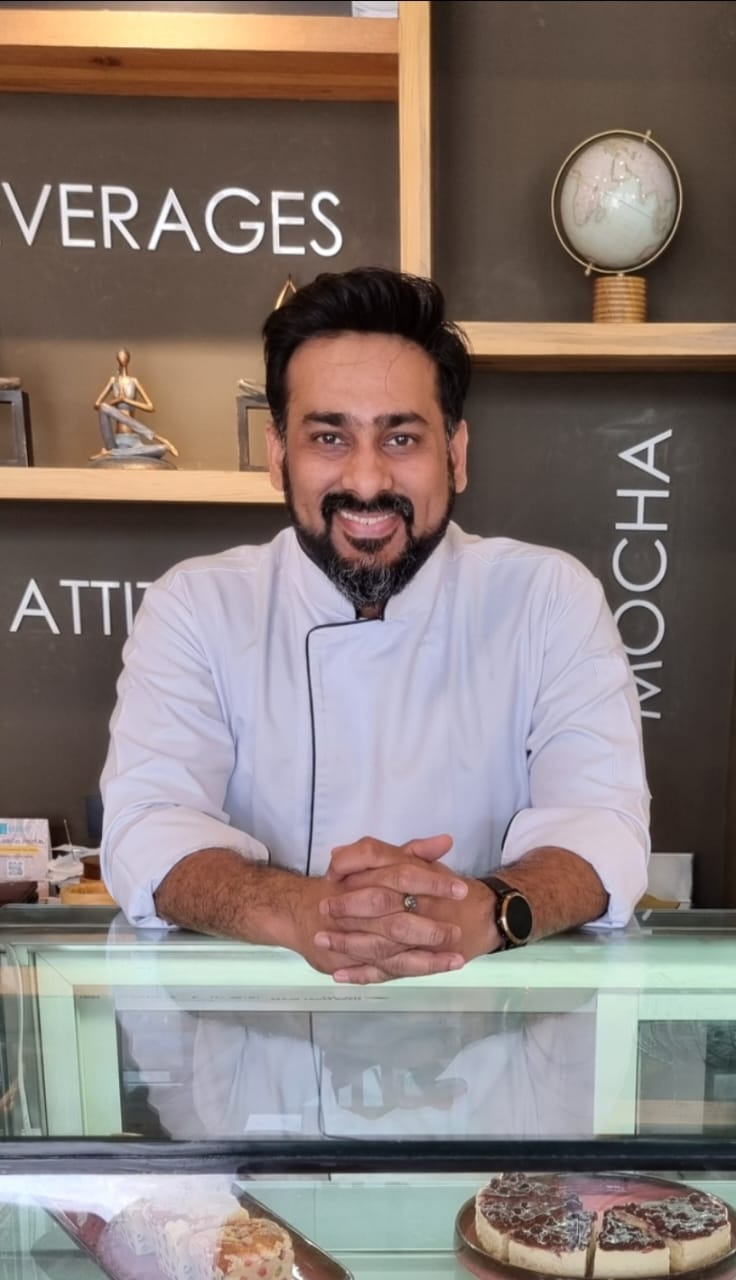
- Born: 28 January 1979 (age 46); Mumbai
- Education: Hotel management diploma, VGP, Chennai American Hotel & Motel Association, Diploma
- Occupation(s): Chef, writer & entrepreneur
- Culinary career
- Cooking style: Contemporary Comfort
- Website: http://chefamitpuri.com/

Amit Puri (born 28 January 1979) is an Indian chef, entrepreneur, and cookbook writer.

== Life and career ==
Amit was born and brought up in Mumbai and was attracted to cooking from his childhood. He holds a Degree from American Hotel and Motel Association. He completed his Diploma at VGP Hotel Management Academy, Chennai.

After his training at The Taj Hotel, Mumbai, he got his first job at The Orchid, Mumbai. He has been associated with various National and International brands such as The Coffee Bean & Tea Leaf, LMNO_Q, Refinery 091, Afterlife gastropub, Dubai to name a few. In 2022, Amit conceptualized and started a cloud kitchen called "The Blue Tiffin" as his entrepreneurial venture in Mumbai, which draws inspiration from the heritage of India.

Amit is also an author of a cookbook titled Redefining Comfort food with Chef Amit Puri. He has been featured in the magazines like Femina, Upper Crust India and Architectural Digest.

== Bibliography ==
- Redefining Comfort food with Chef Amit Puri, ASIN:9389058333
