= Rail transport in India =

Railway Transport In India
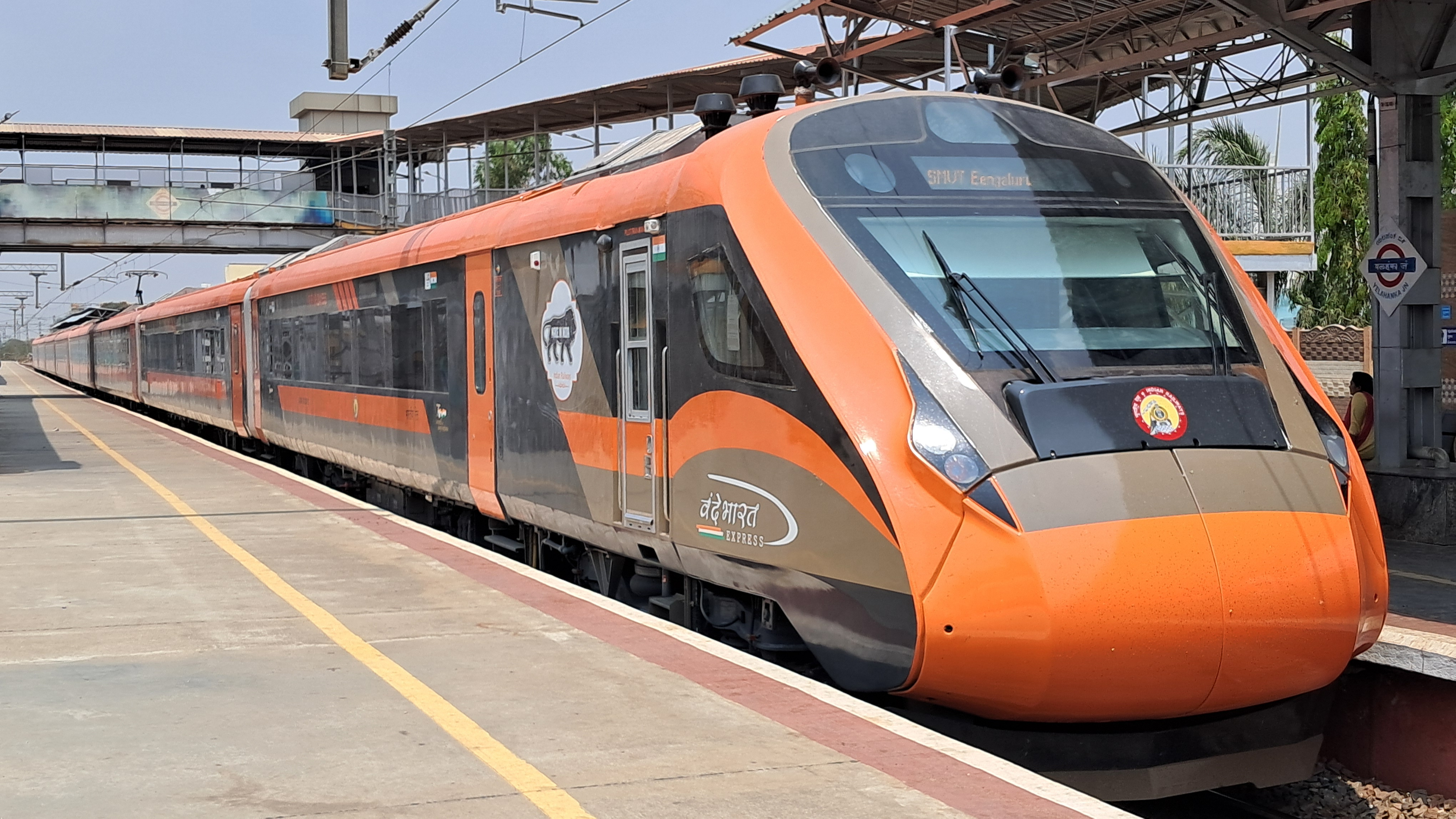
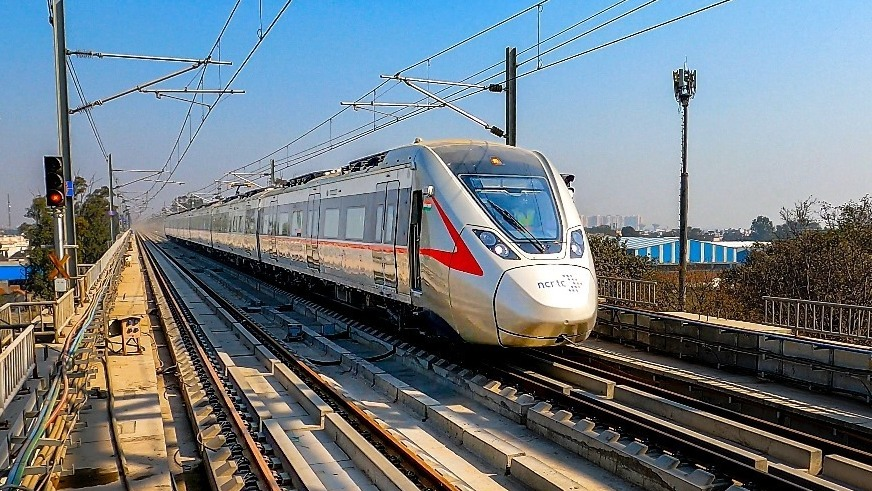
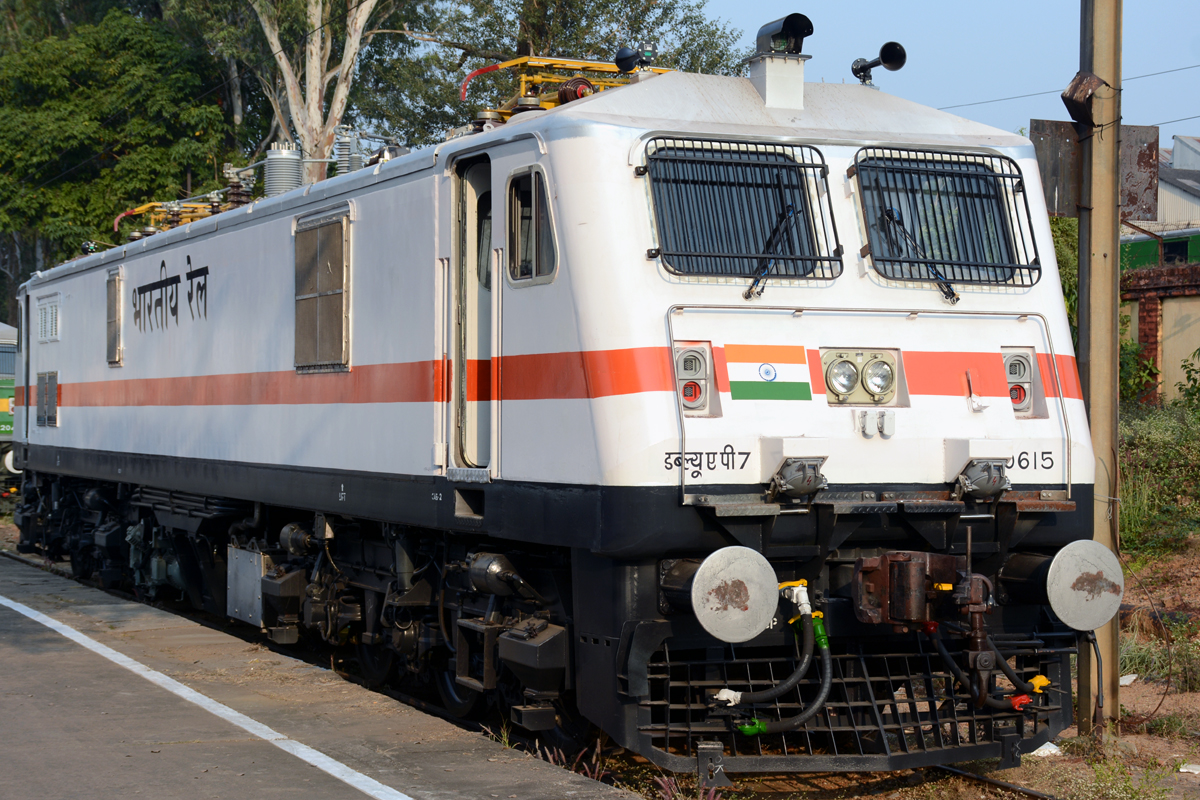
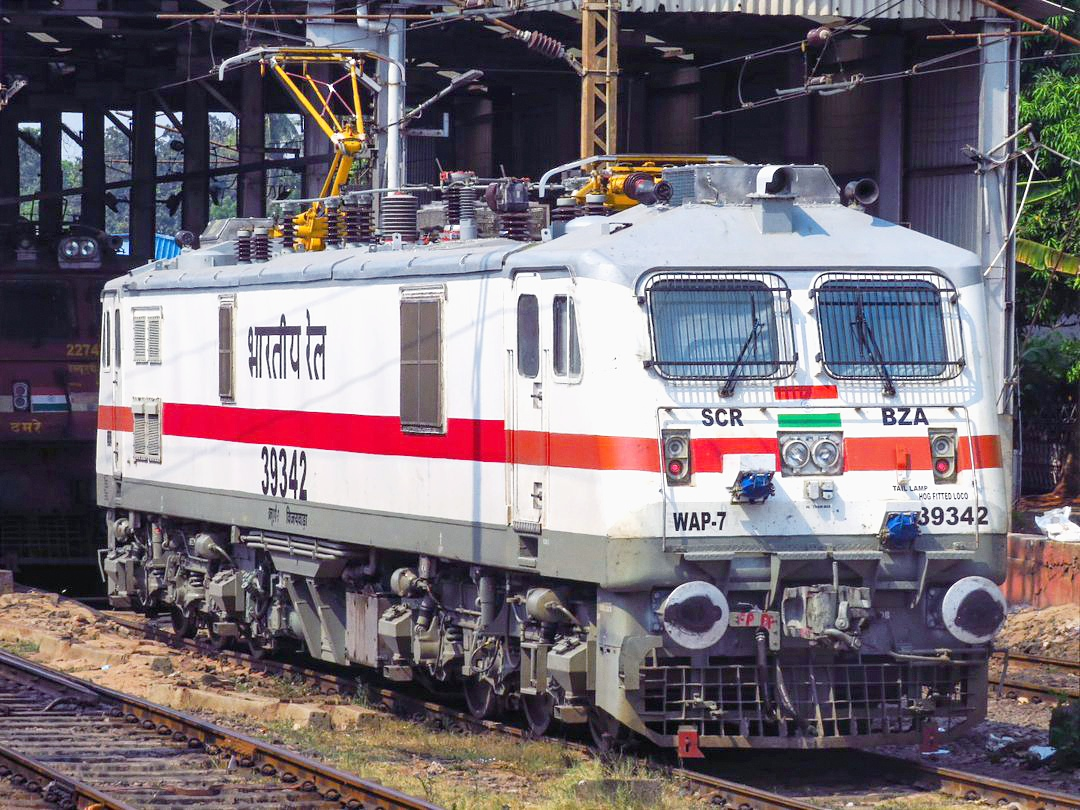
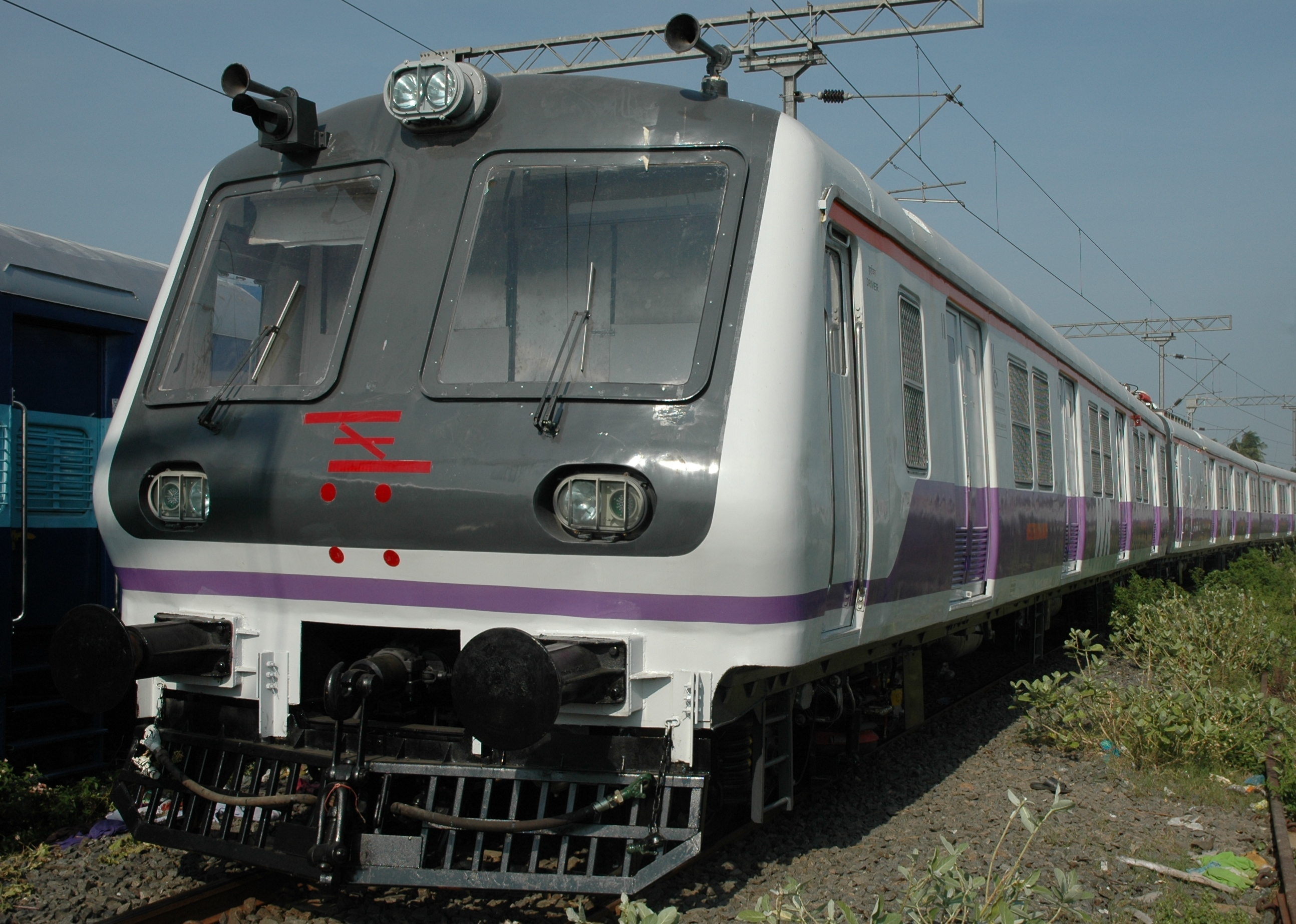
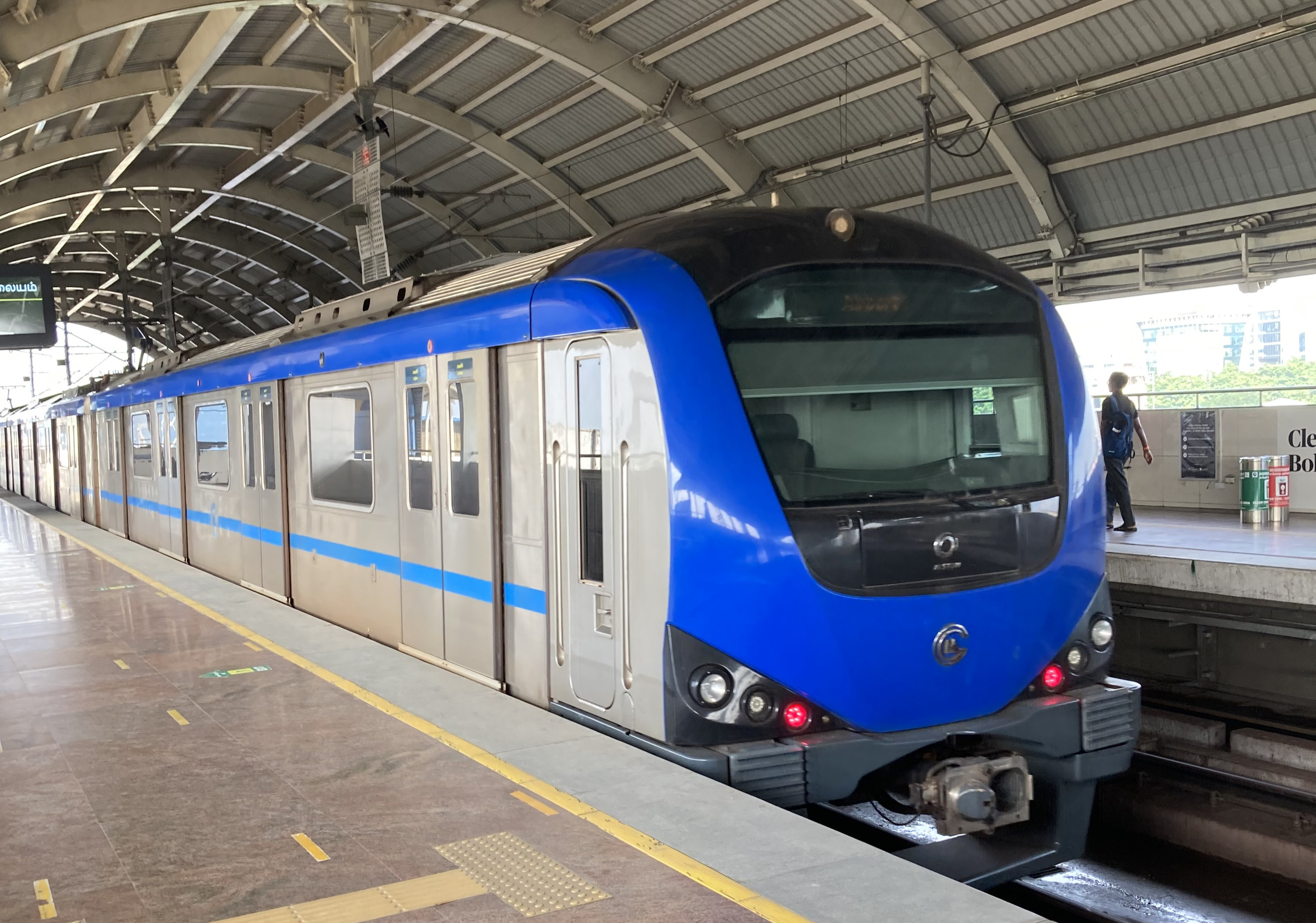
- Vande Bharat Express Namo Bharat rapid rail WDP-4D diesel locomotive WAP-7 electric locomotive Suburban train Metro train

Operation
- National railway: Indian Railways

System length
- Total: Regular/Suburban: 68,584 km (42,616 mi) (Note: About 29,719 km (18,467 mi) of the lines have two or more tracks, and the total running track length was 106,493 km (66,172 mi), and the total trackage (including sidings) was 132,310 km (82,210 mi).); Metro: 895 km (556 mi)
- Double track: 38,415 km (23,870 mi) (2023)
- Electrified: 64,080 km (39,820 mi)

Track gauge
- 1,676 mm (5 ft 6 in) broad gauge: 65,977 km (40,996 mi)
- 1,435 mm (4 ft 8 1/2 in) standard gauge: 245 km (152 mi)
- 1,000 mm (3 ft 3 3/8 in) metre gauge: 1,345 km (836 mi)
- 762 mm (2 ft 6 in) and 610 mm (2 ft): 1,262 km (784 mi)

Features
- Longest tunnel: Pir Panjal Railway Tunnel, 11.215 km (6.969 mi)
- No. of bridges: 156,417 (2023)
- Longest bridge: Bogibeel Bridge, 4.94 km (3.07 mi)
- No. of stations: Total: 8016; Regular/Suburban: 6268; Metro: 748
- Max elevation: 2,257 m (7,405 ft) at Ghum
- Min elevation: 3 m (9.8 ft) at Burra Bazar and Honnavar

Rail transport in India consists primarily of passenger and freight shipments along an integrated rail network. Indian Railways, a statutory body under the ownership of the Ministry of Railways of the Government of India, operates India's national railway system. It is the primary owner and operator of rail operations throughout the country, including suburban rail systems in major metropolitan cities. Economic studies indicate the positive impact of the Indian railway network on the economy of the country.

The majority of the urban metro rail networks are operated by independent bodies constituted for their respective operations. Privately owned railways exist in few places, mostly used to connect freight to the integrated rail network. Inter-city rail services are operated primarily by Indian Railways, though efforts have been made to introduce privately operated trains as recently as 2022.

As of 2023, the national rail network comprised a total route length of 68,584 km (42,616 mi), with more than 132,310 km (82,210 mi) of track and 8,000+ stations and is the fourth-largest in the world. It is one of the busiest networks in the world, and transported more than 11 billion passengers and 1.512 billion tonnes of freight. As of August 2024, more than 64,080 km (39,820 mi) of all the routes have been electrified with 25 KV AC electric traction. The rolling stock consists of 318,196 freight wagons, 84,863 passenger coaches, 14,781 locomotives and other multiple units owned by Indian Railways apart from rail-sets operated by metro rail corporations.

== History ==
=== 1832–1852: Industrial railways ===
In 1832, the proposal to construct the first railway line in India at Madras was made. In 1835, a railway track was constructed between Red Hills and Chintadripet in Madras and became operational in 1837. It was hauled by a rotary steam engine imported from England and was used for ferrying granite.

The Madras Railway was established in 1845. Temporary railway lines were built such as the Godavari Dam Construction Railway at Dowleswaram by Arthur Cotton to supply stone for the construction of a dam over the Godavari River in 1845 and the Solani aqueduct railway, built by Proby Cautley in Roorkee to transport construction materials for an aqueduct over the Solani river in 1851. On 1 August 1849, the Great Indian Peninsula Railway was incorporated with a guarantee system providing free land and guaranteeing five-percent rates of return to private English companies building railways. In 1852, a steam locomotive imported from England was tried at Byculla.

=== 1853–1924: Passenger railways and expansion ===
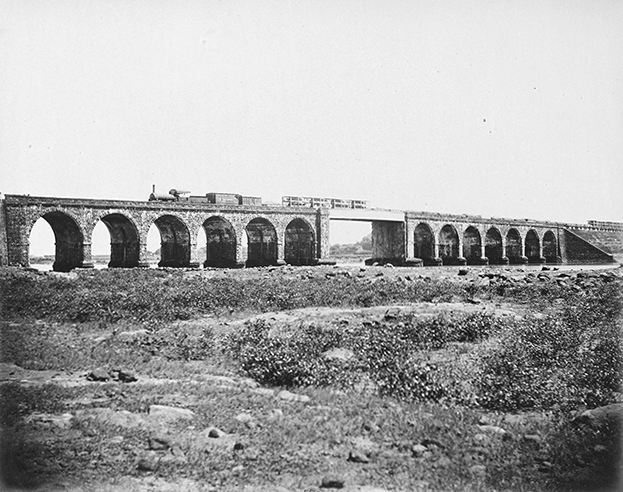
The railway viaduct near Thane in 1855

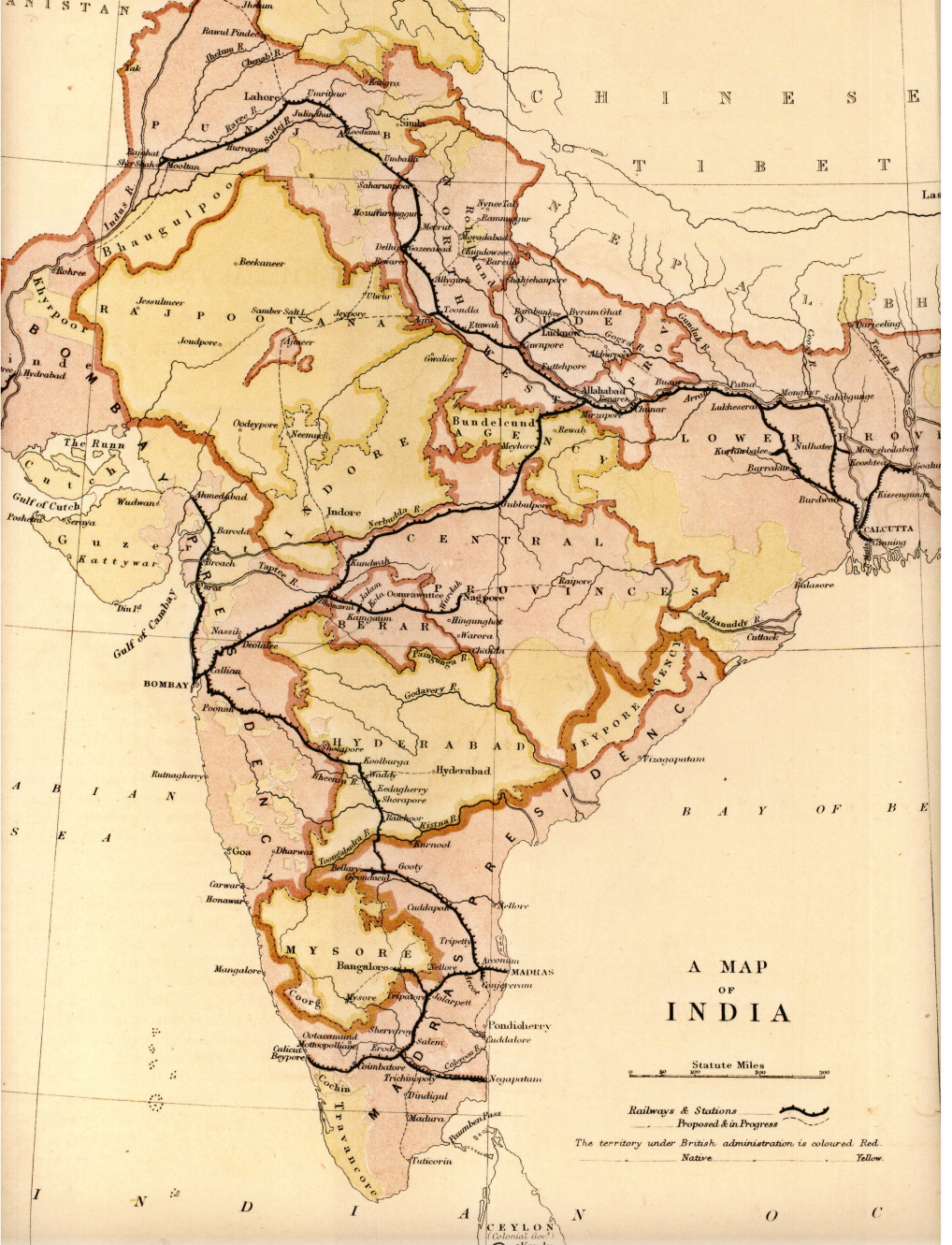
Railway map of India in 1871

In 1853, the first passenger train on 1,676 mm (5 ft 6 in) broad gauge ran for 34 km (21 mi) between Bombay and Thane which had 14-carriages carrying 400 people, hauled by three steam locomotives: the Sahib, Sindh and Sultan. The Great Southern of India Railway Company was established with its headquarters in England in 1853. The Thane viaducts, the first railway bridges, were built over the Thane Creek when the Mumbai-Thane line was extended to Kalyan in May 1854. Eastern India's first passenger train ran 39 km (24 mi) from Howrah, near Kolkata, to Hoogly on 15 August 1854. The construction of 97 km (60 mi) line in the South between Royapuram in Madras and Arcot started in 1853, which became operational on 1 July 1856. The first workshops were established by GIPR at Byculla in 1854 and Madras Railway at Perambur in 1856. The Bombay, Baroda, and Central India Railway (BB&CI) was incorporated in 1855 and the Eastern Bengal Railway in 1858. The Carnatic Railway was founded in 1869. On 24 February 1873, a horse-drawn 3.8 km (2.4 mi) tram opened in Calcutta between Sealdah and Armenian Ghat street. In 1875, a railway line was opened in between Mokama and Darbhanga by the local ruler of Raj Darbhanga through Tirhut Railway. On 9 May 1874, a horse-drawn tramway began operation in Bombay between Colaba and Parel. The Great Southern of India Railway and the Carnatic Railway merged in 1874 to form the South Indian Railway. In 1879, the Nizam's Guaranteed State Railway was established which built railway lines across the then Hyderabad State. In 1877, an Ajmer built F-1/734 Steam Locomotive became the first indigenously built locomotive in India. East Coast State Railway was established in 1890. In 1897, lighting in passenger coaches was introduced with the Jodhpur Railway, the first to introduce electric lighting as standard fixtures. In 1908, Madras Railway merged with Southern Mahratta Railway to form the Madras and Southern Mahratta Railway. Pamban bridge, the first sea bridge was opened on 24 February 1914. In 1920, electric lighting of signals was introduced between Dadar and Currey Road in Bombay.

=== 1925–1949: Electrification and further expansion ===
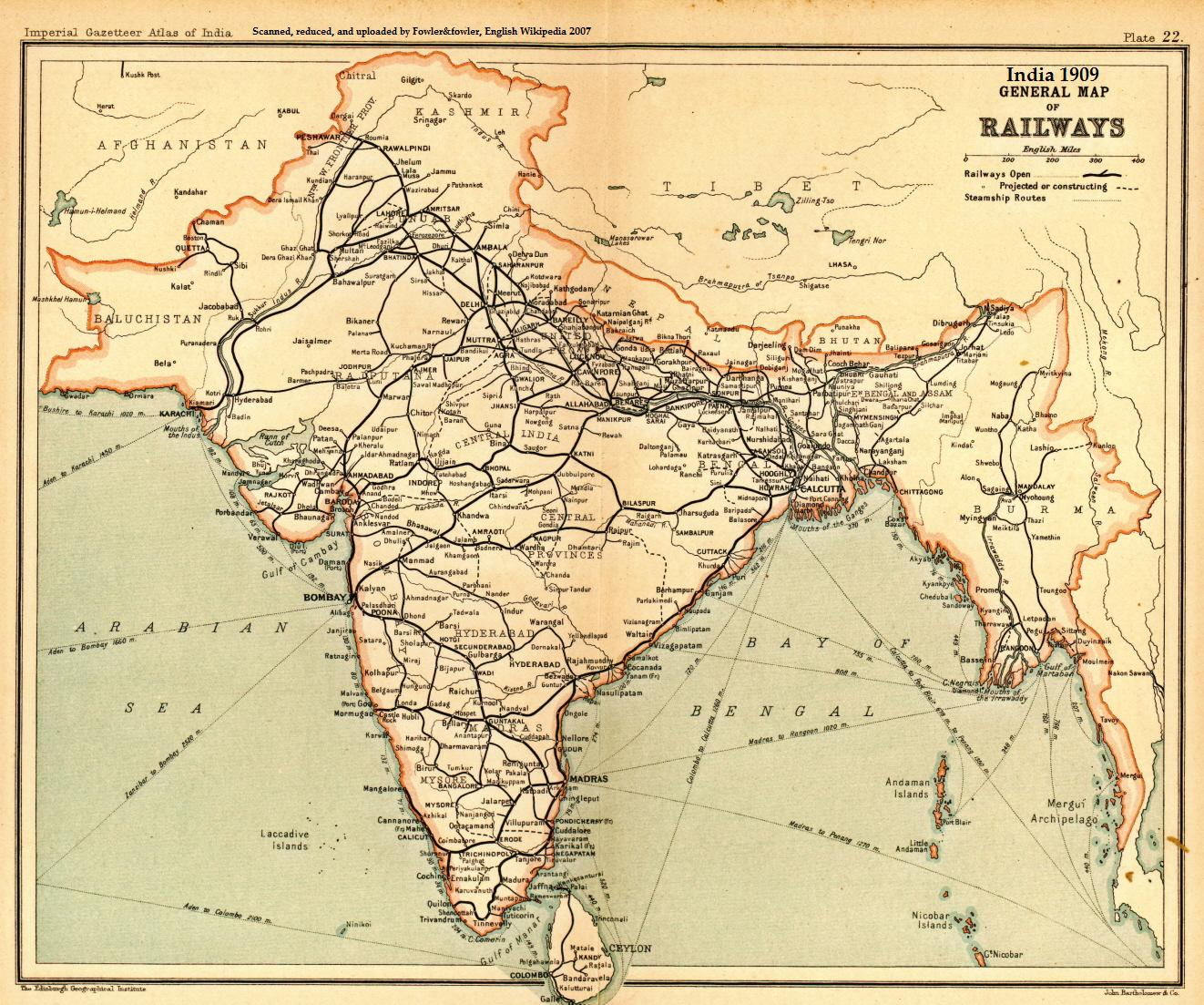
Railway map of India in 1909

The first railway budget was presented in 1924. The Oudh and Rohilkhand Railway was merged with the East Indian Railway Company (EIR) in the same year. On 3 February 1925, the first electric train ran between Victoria Terminus (VT) and Kurla, hauled by a SLM electric locomotive on 1500 V DC traction. Later, the VT–Bandra section was electrified and the first electric multiple units (EMU) were introduced in with 1.5KV DC units imported were from Cammell Laird and Uerdingenwagonfabrik. On 1 April 1929, Grand Trunk Express commenced operations between Peshawar in the North Western Railway and Mangalore with two coaches detached and connected to Madras further. The Frontier Mail made its inaugural run between Bombay and Peshawar in 1928. Technical advancements led to automatic colour light signals that become operational between Bombay and Byculla in 1928. In the subsequent years, the route from Bombay to Poona was electrified and in June 1930, the first deluxe train, Deccan Queen began running, hauled by a WCP-1 locomotives with seven coaches along the route. The Grand Trunk express commenced operating as a dedicated daily train between Madras and Delhi from 1 September 1930. Chennai suburban railway started operating in 1931 with a single metre gauge line from Chennai Beach to Tambaram. In 1944, all the railway companies were taken over by the Government.

==== Indian railway classification ====
Beginning in 1926 and for statistical purposes, the Government of British Raj classified Indian railway systems according to three classes. It was a similar system to the Railroad classes in North America.

Class I	Railways with gross annual earnings of over 5,000,000 INR
Class II	Railways with gross annual earnings of between 1,000,000 and 5,000,000 INR
Class III	Railways with gross annual earnings of under 1,000,000 INR

Trams, industrial and port railways were recorded separately and independently of turnover. In terms of net revenue, East Indian Railway was the largest company in 1927 with 86,881,000 rupees. Followed by the North Western State Railway with 57,343,000 rupees and the Great Indian Peninsula Railway with 56,215,000 rupees. No further reclassification was carried out after 1942, but the rankings remained in use until the mid-1950s.

=== 1950–1983: Zonal re-organisation and further developments ===
The first locomotive manufacturing unit at Chittaranjan was commissioned in 1950. In December 1950, the Central Advisory Committee for Railways approved the plan for re-organising Indian Railways into six regional zones with the Southern (14 April 1951), Central (5 November 1951), and Western (5 November 1951) zones being the first to be created. On 14 April 1952, the Northern Railway, the Eastern Railway and the North Eastern Railway were created. In 1952, fans and lights were mandated for all compartments in passenger trains, and sleeping accommodations were introduced in coaches. In 1953, the Indian Railways completed a hundred years of operation, which was commemorated by multiple events and a commemorative postage stamp. The first diesel locomotive used in India was fabricated by North British Locomotive Company in 1954. On 1 August 1955 the South-Eastern Railway was split from the Eastern Railway, and, the following year, divisional systems of administration were set up for the various regional zones. The first rail coaches were manufactured in India from 1956 when the Integral Coach Factory was established at Madras. In 1956, the first air-conditioned train plied between Howrah and New Delhi. In 1958, the North-Eastern Railway split to form a new Northeast Frontier Railway.

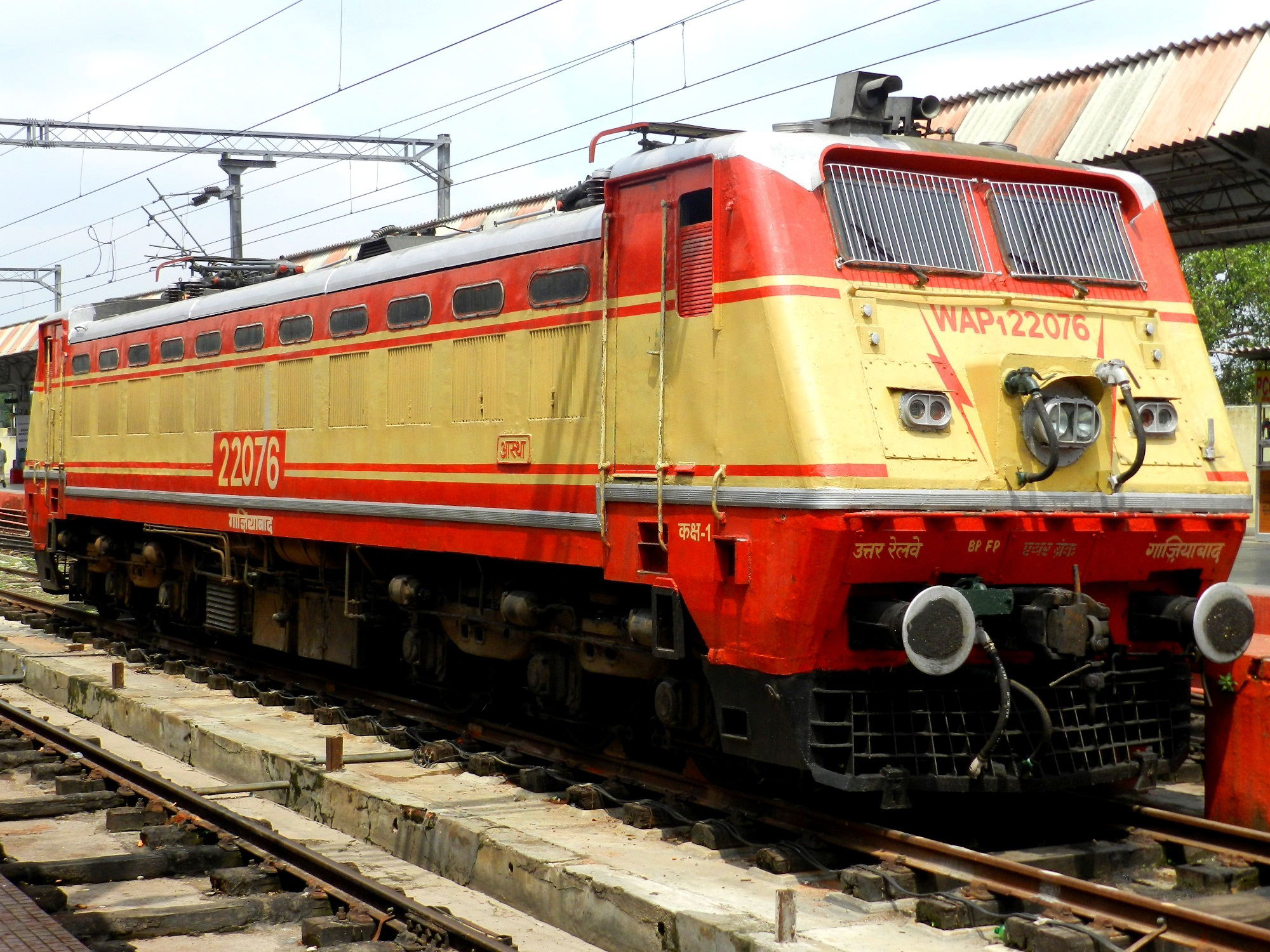
WAP-1 electric locomotives reached a speed of 130 km/h (81 mph) in 1980

In 1957, Indian Railways adopted 25 kV AC traction with the first trial runs operating with the WAM-1 locomotives in 1959 and commercial services beginning in August 1960. In 1960, the Railway Board of India commissioned a study to increase the speed of passenger trains to 160 km/h (99 mph) with an intermediate stage of 120 km/h (75 mph). Research Design and Standards Organisation (RDSO) started work on the same in 1962 with field trials commencing in 1967 with coaches manufactured by the Integral Coach Factory at Madras and hauled by diesel locomotives. The first containerized freight rail transport began between Bombay and Ahmedabad in 1966. In 1966, the electrification of several suburban tracks around Delhi, Madras, and Calcutta were completed with the 25 kV AC system. In 1969, the Government of India announced the introduction of a new express train capable of reaching speeds of up to 120 km/h (75 mph) in the railway budget and the first Rajdhani Express was flagged off from New Delhi to Howrah in March 1969. In 1974, Indian Railways endured a 20-day strike. In 1979, the Main Line Electrification Project was reconstituted into the Central Organisation for Railway Electrification (CORE). In 1980, the WAP-1 electric locomotives reached a speed of 130 km/h (81 mph).

=== 1984–present: Rapid transit and later developments ===
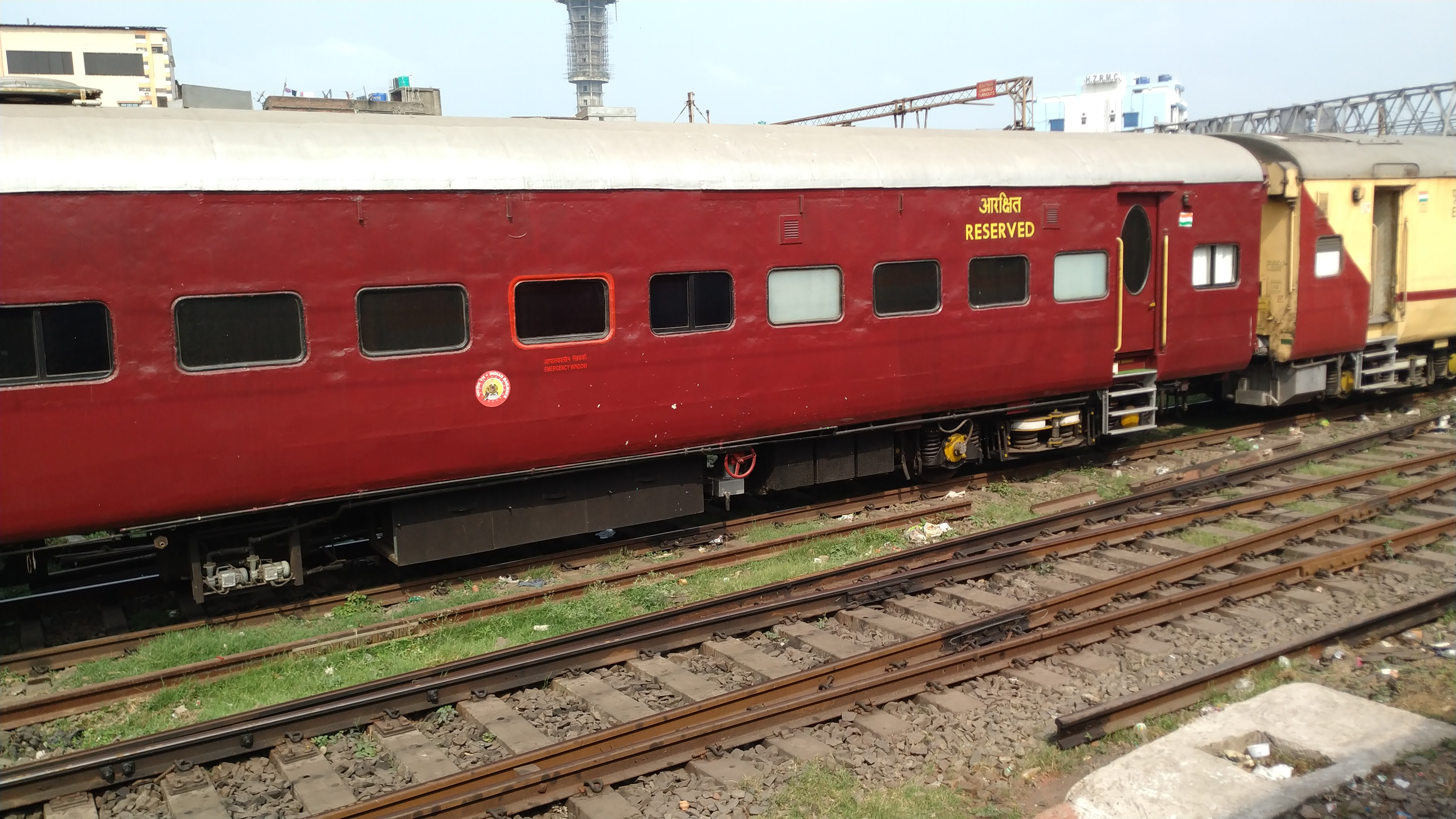
A typical red-colored ICF coach used by the Indian Railways till the late 1990s

The first metro rail was introduced in Calcutta on 24 October 1984 with the line between Esplanade and Bhowanipore. In 1986, computerized ticketing and reservations were introduced by Indian Railways. In 1988, the first Shatabdi Express was introduced between New Delhi and Jhansi. Two years later, the first self-printing ticket machine (SPTM) was introduced in Delhi. In 1993, air-conditioned three-tier and sleeper were introduced. In 1995, Chennai MRTS became the first operational elevated railway line in India. In 1995, Delhi Metro Rail Corporation, a joint venture between Government of India and Government of Delhi was established. Centralized computer reservation system was deployed in Delhi, Mumbai and Chennai in September 1996, coupon validating machines (CVMs) were introduced at Mumbai CSMT in 1998 and the nationwide concierge system began operation on 18 April 1999. In 1999, the South East Central Railway zone was established and on 6 July 2002, the East Coast, South Western, South East Central, North Central, and West Central zones were created.

The Indian Railways website went online in February 2000. Indian Railways Catering and Tourism Corporation (IRCTC) was incorporated in 1999, and online ticketing was introduced on 3 August 2002 through IRCTC. The first line of the Delhi Metro was inaugurated on 24 December 2002. In 2012, Western Railway switched completely to AC traction with Central Railway following it in 2016. On 1 February 2014, Mumbai Monorail became the first operational monorail system in India. In 2015, the first compressed natural gas (CNG) powered trains were rolled out. On 5 April 2016, Gatiman Express, then India's fastest train with a maximum speed of 160 km/h (99 mph), made its first run from New Delhi to Agra Cantonment.

The central government approved the merger of the Rail and General budgets from 2017. On 31 March 2017, Indian Railways announced a target of electrifying the entire rail network by 2023. In March 2020, Indian Railways announced a nationwide shutdown of passenger service to combat the COVID-19 pandemic in India with the freight operations continuing to transport essential goods. The railways resumed passenger services in a phased manner in May 2020.

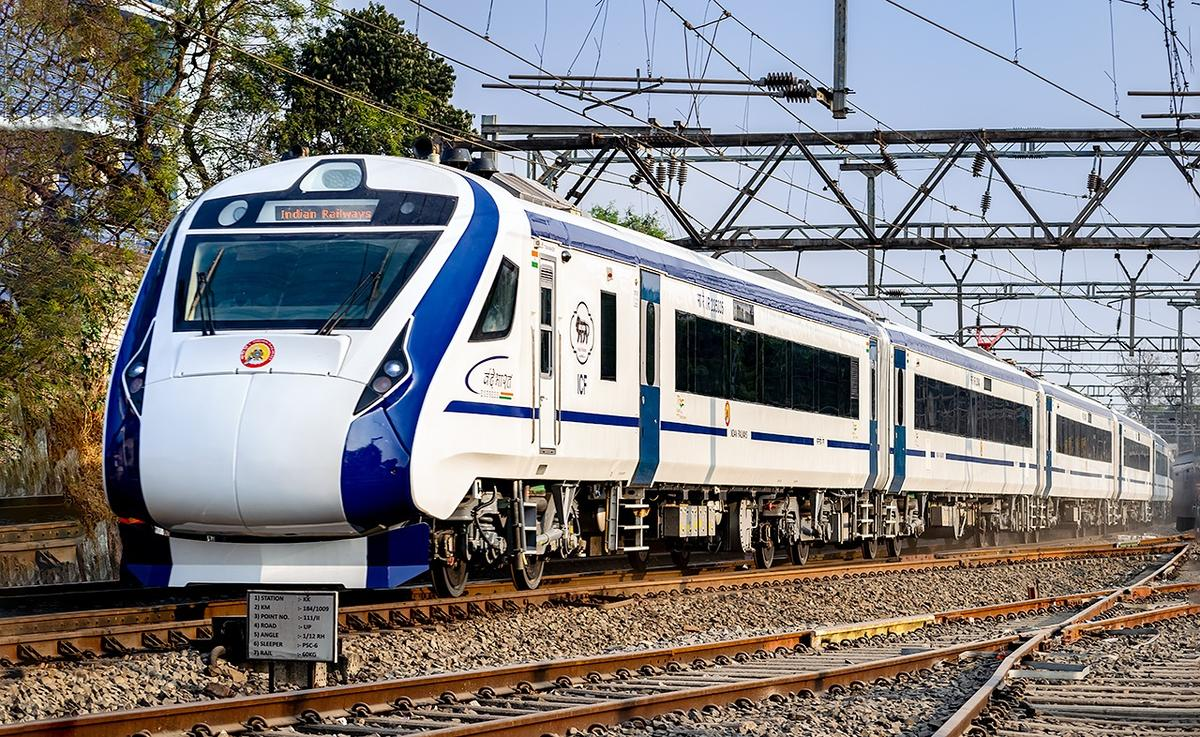
Introduced in 2019, Vande Bharat Express operating on a trainset built by ICF, is the fastest train in India

Starting in the 2010s, various infrastructure modernization projects have been undertaken including high-speed rail, redevelopment of 400 stations, doubling tracks to reduce congestion, refurbishing of coaches, Global Positioning System (GPS)-enabled tracking of trains and modernization of locomotives. In 2018, a semi-high speed self-propelled train-set capable of reaching speeds of over 160 km/h (99 mph) was rolled out from ICF and the Vande Bharat Express was launched in 2019. Indian Railways announced plans to become a net-zero carbon emission railway by 2030 and has implemented rainwater harvesting at stations, reforestation along the tracks, introduction of solar-powered trains, installation of solar and wind power generation facilities, and sustainable LED lighting at all the stations. Indian railways removed all unstaffed level crossings by 2019 with staffed level crossings being replaced by bridges. Other safety projects include the extension of an automated fire alarm system to all air-conditioned coaches and GPS-enabled Fog Pilot Assistance System railway signalling devices. In 2020, Indian Railways allowed the operation of private passenger trains for the first time with the first train flagged off from Coimbatore in June 2022. The South Coast Railway zone began its operations on 1 June 2026.

== Network and infrastructure ==
=== Tracks ===
Different gauges in use in India

Indian railways operates a 68,584 km (42,616 mi) 1,676 mm (5 ft 6 in) broad-gauge network which is equipped with long-welded, high-tensile 52kg/60kg 90 UTS rails with pre-stressed concrete (PSC) sleepers and elastic fastenings. These tracks are shared by both freight and passenger trains, with passenger trains often prioritized on the network.

As of 31 March 2023, the Indian railway network spanned 68,584 km (42,616 mi) in route length. Track sections are rated for speeds ranging from 80 to 200 km/h (50 to 124 mph), though the maximum speed attained by passenger trains is 160 km/h (99 mph). Spanning 65,093 km (40,447 mi) 1,676 mm (5 ft 6 in) broad gauge is the most used gauge with 1,000 mm (3 ft 3 3/8 in) metre gauge and 762 mm (2 ft 6 in) narrow gauge and 610 mm (2 ft) narrower gauge tracks limited to certain routes. Indian Railways uses a range of signalling technologies and methods to manage its train operations based on traffic density and safety requirements. It primarily uses coloured signal lights, which replaced the earlier semaphores and disc-based signalling.

=== Stations ===
As of March 2023, Indian Railways manages and operates 7,308 stations. Prior to 2017, the stations were classified into seven categories based on their earnings. Since 2017, Indian Railways categorizes the stations by commercial importance into three different categories namely Non Suburban Group (NSG), Suburban Group (SG) and Halt Group (HG). These are further subdivided into subcategories based on their commercial importance (NSG 1–6, SG 1-3 and from HG 1–3). The commercial importance of a station is determined by taking into account its passenger footfall, earnings and strategic importance and these categories are used to determine the minimum essential amenities required by each station.

=== Route length and electrification ===
Growth of Indian railway network and its electrification since 1951

Historical railway route length
Year	Route (km)	±%	Electrified route (km)	% of route electrified	±%
1951	53,596	—N/a	388	0.72%	—N/a
1961	56,247	+4.94%	748	1.32%	+92.78%
1971	59,790	+6.29%	3,706	6.19%	+395.45%
1981	61,240	+2.42%	5,345	8.72%	+44.22%
1991	62,367	+1.84%	9,968	15.98%	+88.49%
2001	63,028	+1.05%	14,856	23.57%	+49.03%
2011	64,173	+1.81%	19,607	30.55%	+31.98%
2021	68,103	+6.12%	45,772	67.20%	+133.44%
2025	69,987	+2.76%	69,427	99.20%	+51.66%

== Freight trains ==
=== Rolling stock ===
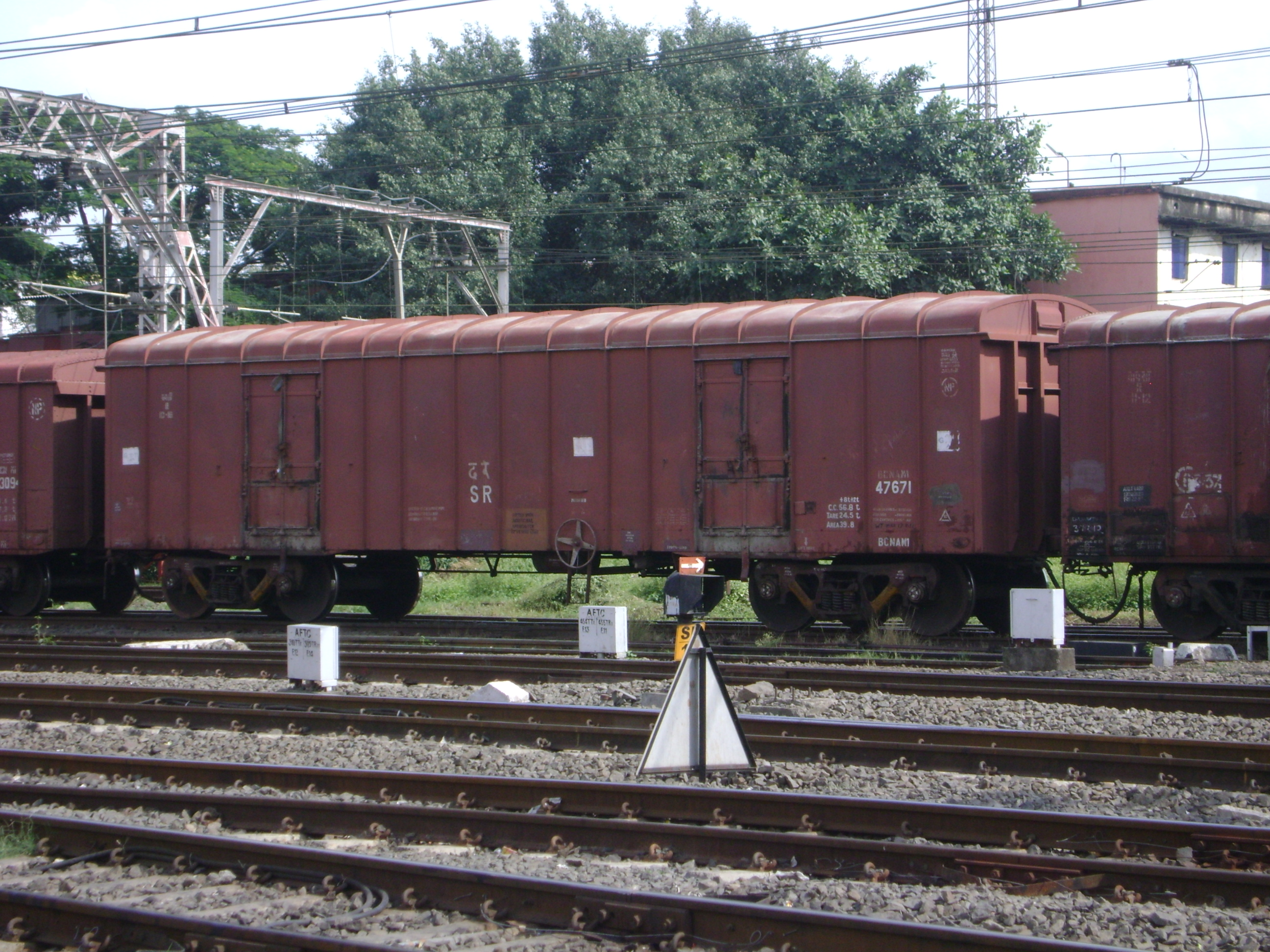
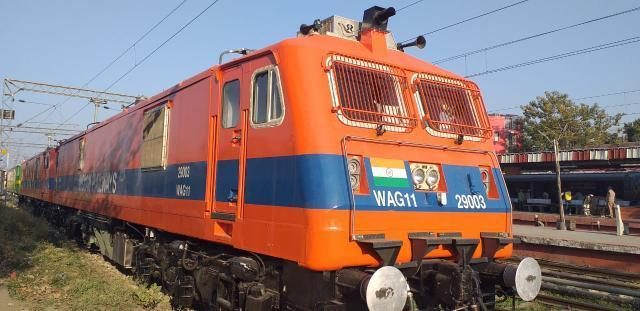
A covered wagon (left) and a WAG-11 electric locomotive used to haul freight

Indian Railways hauls a variety of cargo to cater to various requirements and has specialized rolling stock corresponding to the cargo hauled. There are 243 types of rolling stock used for cargo operations. These include covered wagons, boxcars, flat wagons, flatbeds, open wagons, hoppers, containers, automobile carriers, defense vehicle carriers and tankers. The freight cars can often carry loads from 10 to 80 tonnes per car depending on the configuration. A new wagon numbering system was adopted in Indian Railways in 2003. The requirement of wagons was previously met by Bharat wagon and engineering with the procurement and manufacturing now done by both in the public and private sector. The earliest goods trains in the 1800s were hauled by imported steam locomotives. Locomotives are classified by various parameters including function (passenger/goods/mixed). Indian Railways uses dedicated electric locomotives such as WAG series (Wide AC goods), dedicated diesel locomotives such as WDG series and diesel locomotives of mixed usage such as WDM series to haul freight trains.

=== Services ===
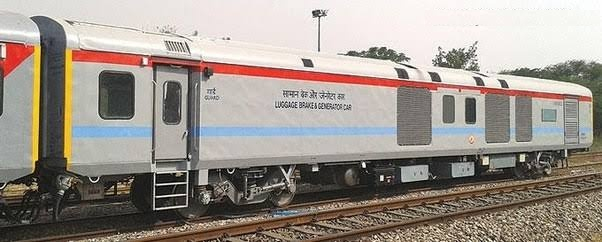
A hybrid coach with provision to carry small cargo and mail, often attached to passenger trains

The first rail operational in Madras in 1837 was used for ferrying granite. The first dedicated commercial freight rail was operated between Bombay and Ahmedabad in 1966. Indian Railways ferries various commodities and cargo to cater to various industrial, consumer, and agricultural segments. Apart from dedicated freight trains, parcels, mail and small cargo are carried on specialized carriages attached to passenger trains. In 2022–23, Indian Railways operated 8,479 trains on average daily and transported 1418.1 million tonnes of freight. Indian Railways has historically subsidized the passenger segment with income from the freight business, and hence, freight services were unable to compete with their modes of transport on both cost and speed of delivery, leading to continuous erosion of market share till the early 2000s. To counter this, Indian Railways aimed to increase speed and reliability through various means including operating time-tabled freight trains and tweaking with the freight pricing/product mix. End-to-end integrated transport solutions such as roll-on, roll-off (RORO) service, a road-rail system pioneered by Konkan Railway in 1999 to carry trucks on flatbed trailers has been extended to other routes.

Freight loads
Year	1951	1961	1971	1981	1991	2001	2011	2021	2023
Freight loading (million tonnes)	73.2	119.8	167.9	195.9	318.4	473.5	921.73	1233	1512

=== Dedicated freight corridors ===
The Dedicated Freight Corridor Corporation of India (DFCCI) was established in 2006 to construct dedicated freight corridors to reduce congestion, increase speed and reliability and proposed upgradation of existing goods sheds, attracting private capital to build dedicated logistics terminals. The Western Dedicated Freight Corridor (WDFC) utilises the indigenously designed high-rise pantograph by Stone India Ltd, which allows for double stacking of containers with electric locomotives. As of March 2025, a total route length of 2,741 km (1,703 mi) was operational.

== Express and passenger trains ==
=== Rolling stock ===
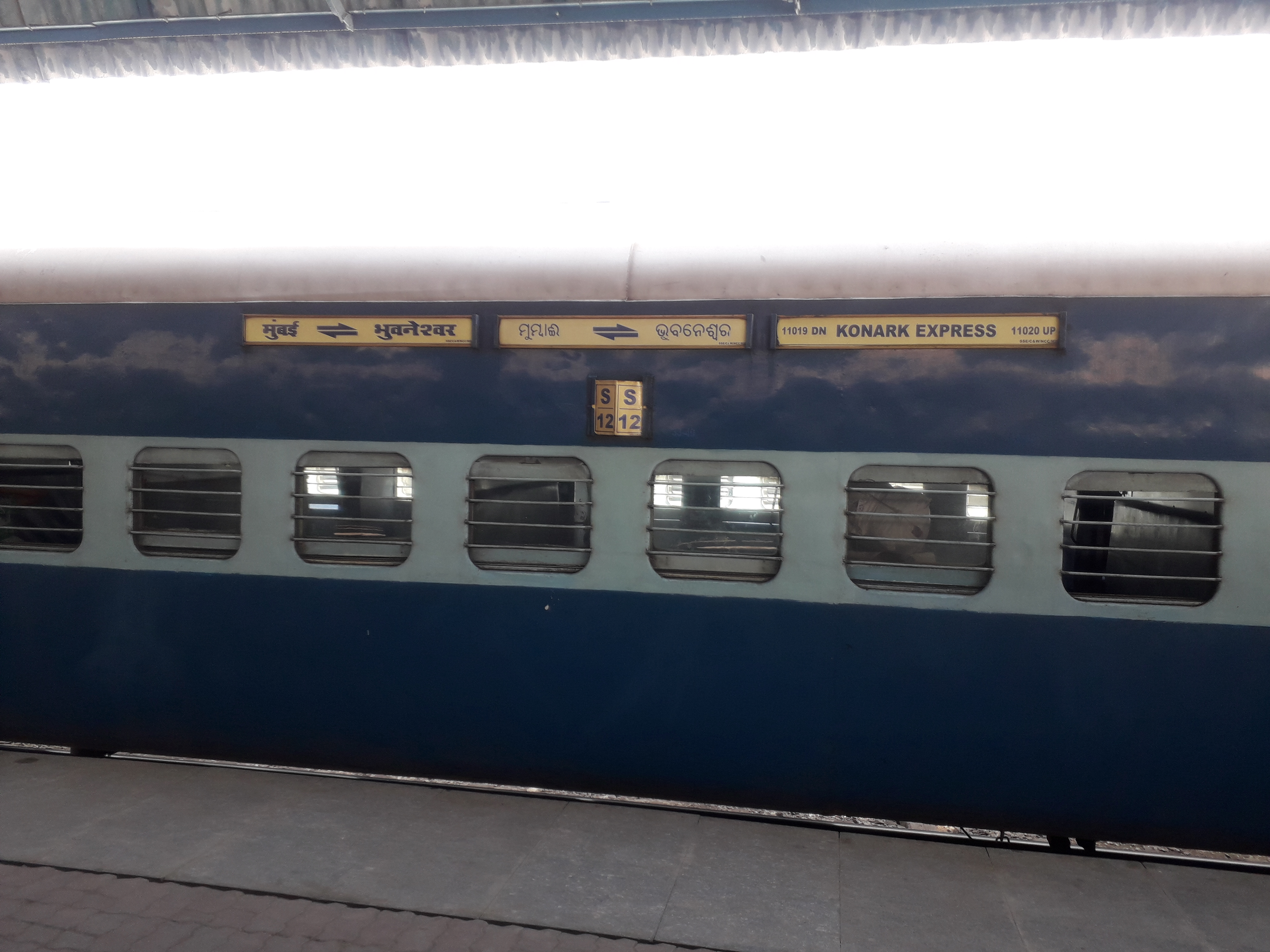
ICF coach

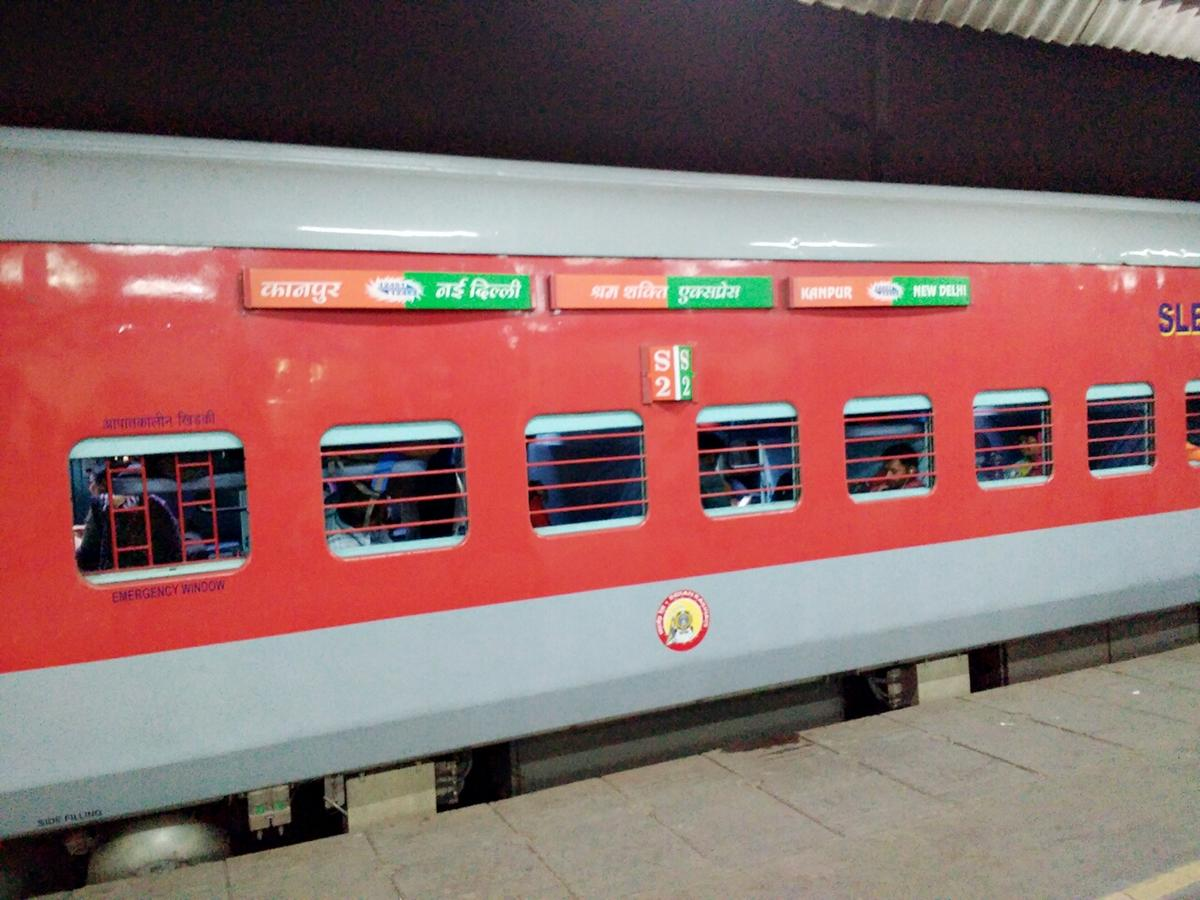
LHB coach

The early rail coaches were based on a prototype by a Swiss company and were termed as ICF coaches after Integral Coach Factory (ICF), the first coach manufacturing unit in India. These coaches, manufactured from 1955 to 2018, were largely in use till the early 2010s. From the late 1990s, the ICF coaches were replaced by safer and newer LHB coaches designed by Linke-Hofmann-Busch of Germany. In the late 2010s, Indian railways started upgrading the coaches of select trains from LHB to new Tejas coaches with enhanced features. As of March 2023, Indian Railways' had 84,863 passenger coaches. Coaches are manufactured by five manufacturing units of the Indian Railways and public sector companies BEML and BHEL. The coaching stock has unique five or six-digit identifiers. Till 2018, the first two digits indicated the year of manufacture and the last three digits indicated the class. In 2018, the numbering system was changed with the first two digits indicating the year of manufacture and the last four digits indicating the sequence number.

=== Services ===
Travel classes

Indian Railways offers various travel classes on its coaches. For the purpose of identification in passenger trains, coaches in a train-set are assigned an alphanumeric code. The first letter identifies the coach class and the second letter identifies the coach number. The berths and seats are numbered by an alphanumeric code with the letter(s) identifying the berth/seat type and numbers identifying the position. In standard coaches, the berths and seats are classified as follows:

Coach code (First digit)
Class	Code	Image	Description
First AC	H		It is the most luxurious and expensive class in most express trains. They have separate air-conditioned compartments with private lockable doors, bedding, dedicated attendants and meals served at seat.
First Class	F		First class is similar to first AC coaches with a combination of cabins and berths but are non air-conditioned and do not have all the facilities of first AC coaches. They were started to be phased out of normal express trains starting in the 2000s and the last coach being de-commissioned in 2015. The First class is still in use in toy trains where the coaches consist of seats similar to chair cars.
Executive Anubhuti	EA		Executive Anubhuti is the premium class of air-conditioned chair car equipped with retractable, large cushioned seats in 2x2 configuration. The class is equipped with an entertainment system, large luggage compartments, passenger information system, dedicated reading lights, power sockets and call buttons, modular bio toilets with automated taps. Meals often provided as a part of the journey ticket. The class is available only in select trains.
AC Executive Class	E		AC Executive Class is often the top most class of air-conditioned chair car in express trains. It is equipped with large retractable seats in 2x2 configuration. The class is equipped with dedicated reading lights and power sockets, modular bio toilets with automated taps. Meals are often provided as a part of the journey ticket. In Vande Bharat Express trains, the class is equipped with more features including rotating seats, CCTVs, passenger information system, larger toilets, USB ports and automated doors.
Executive Vistadome	EV		AC Tourist cars have vistadome coaches with glass roofs and extra wide windows. The interiors are similar to AC chair car coaches. Select trains operating mostly on tourist circuits are equipped with such coaches. Indian Railways plans to introduce these coaches in all mountain railways.
Second AC or AC 2-tier	A		Second AC or AC 2-tier is an air-conditioned sleeping car with wide sealed windows. There are four berths arranged in two-tiers facing each other in a single bay with two-tiered berths arranged on the sides lengthwise across the corridor. Individual berths are equipped with curtains, simple bedding, reading lights and charging sockets. Food is available on order or as a part of the ticket depending on the train.
Third AC or AC 3-tier	B		Third AC or AC 3-tier is an air-conditioned sleeping car. There are six berths arranged in three-tiers facing each other in a single bay with foldable middle berths and two-tiered berths arranged on the sides lengthwise across the corridor. There are common charging sockets and lights in each compartment with simple bedding provided. Food is available on order or as a part of the ticket depending on the train with the same menu shared with AC 2-tier.
AC 3-tier economy	M or G		AC 3-tier economy coaches are air-conditioned sleeping cars similar to AC 3-tier. Compared to 3-tier coaches, they have an extra middle berth along the aisle. The coaches were first introduced in Garib Rath trains and only a few trains operate with such coaches. Bedding is available for rent and the coaches have facilities like charging sockets and lights similar to AC 3-tier coaches.
AC Chair Car	C		AC chair car are air-conditioned coaches equipped with retractable seats in 3x2 configuration. The class has cushioned seats with tray tables and are equipped with LED reading lights, power sockets along the window side. Meals are provided as a part of the journey ticket in select trains. In Vande Bharat Express trains, the class is equipped with more features including passenger information system, CCTVs, larger toilets and automated doors.
Sleeper	S		Sleeper class is the most common sleeping car coach in Indian Railways. There are six berths arranged in three-tiers facing each other in a single bay with foldable middle berths and two-tiered berths arranged on the sides lengthwise across the corridor. The coaches are not air-conditioned and have open-able windows. There are common charging sockets, ceiling mounted fans and lights in each compartment. Food is available on order or can be purchased from vendors.
Second sitting	D		Second sitting is the most common chair car coach and the cheapest in the Indian Railways. It is common in most day-time running trains with six seats arranged in 3x3 configuration. The seats may face each other or towards the same side. The coaches are not air-conditioned and have open-able windows. There are common charging sockets, ceiling mounted fans and lights in each compartment. Food is available on order or can be purchased from vendors.
Unreserved or General	UR/GS		Unreserved or general coaches are second seating coaches which are not available for reservation and seats are taken on available basis. One or more of these coaches are attached to express trains while dedicated passenger trains might also have all unreserved coaches. Tickets are valid on any train on a route only for within 24 hours of purchase.

Saloon coaches are also available for chartering which are equipped with a bedroom and kitchen and can be attached to normal trains.

Trains

Express trains of India

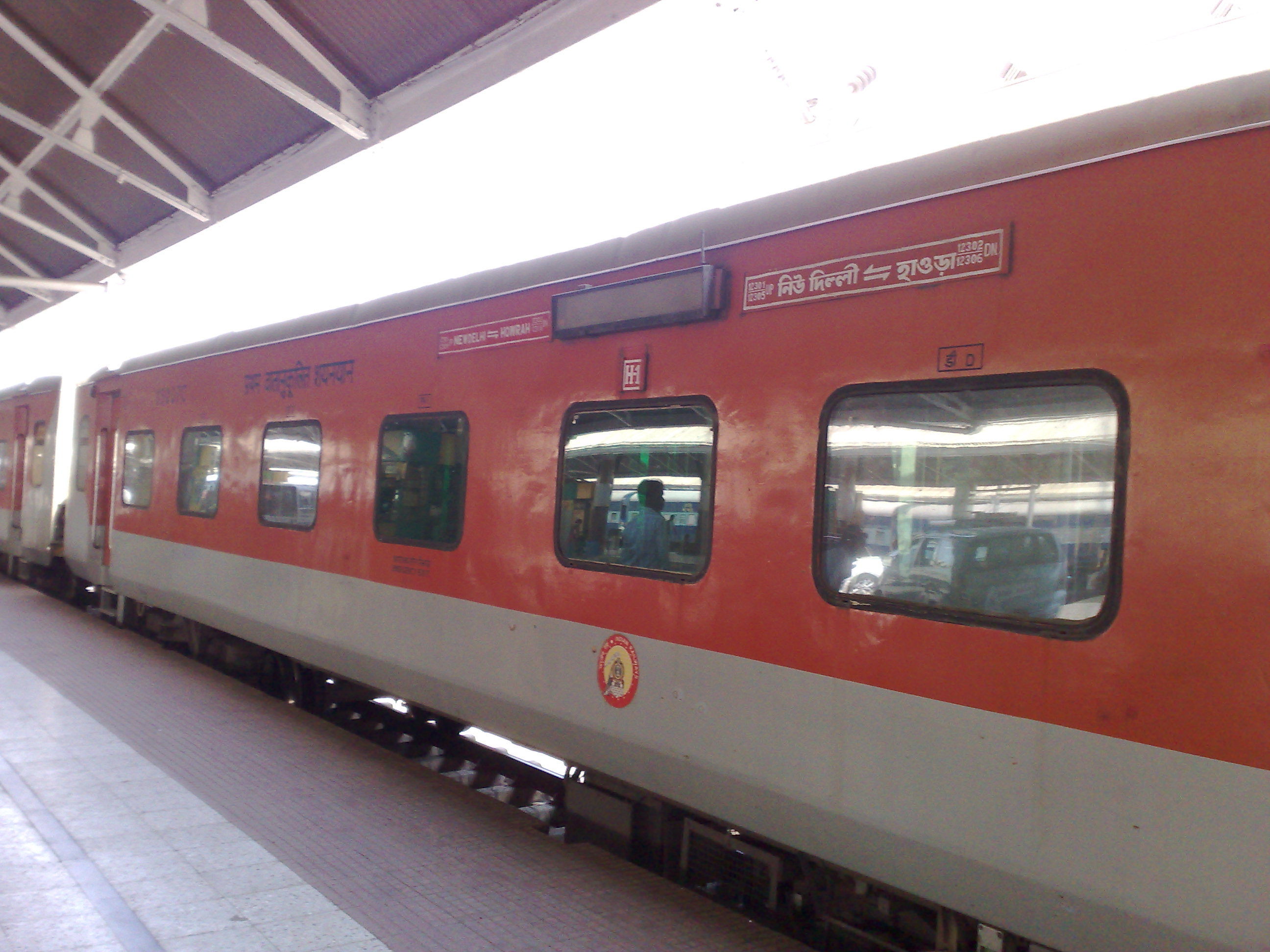
Rajdhani Express

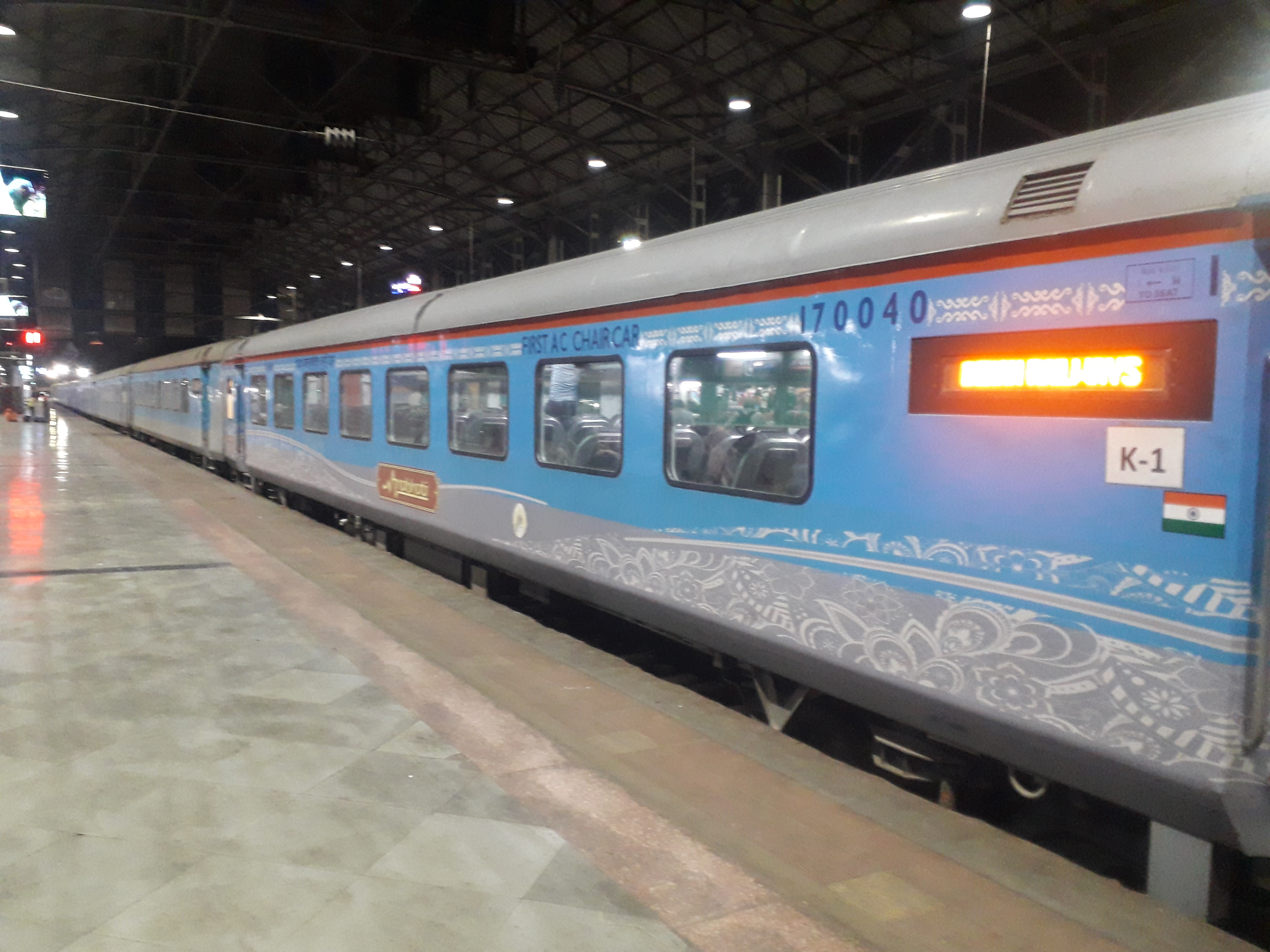
Shatabdi Express

Indian Railways operates various classes of passenger and express trains. The trains are classified basis average speed and facilities with express trains having fewer halts, priority on rail network and faster average speed. The trains are identified by five digit numbers with train-pairs traveling in opposite directions usually labelled with consecutive numbers. Express trains often have specific unique names for easy identification. In 2018–19, Indian Railways operated 13,523 passenger trains on average daily and carried 8.44 billion passengers. India Railways operates various categories of express trains including Rajdhani Express, Shatabdi Express, Garib Rath Express, Double Decker Express, Tejas Express, Gatiman Express, Humsafar Express, Duronto Express, Yuva Express, Uday Express, Jan Shatabdi Express, Sampark Kranti Express, Vivek Express, Rajya Rani Express, Mahamana Express, Antyodaya Express, Jan Sadharan Express, Suvidha Express and Intercity Express.

==== Ticketing and fares ====
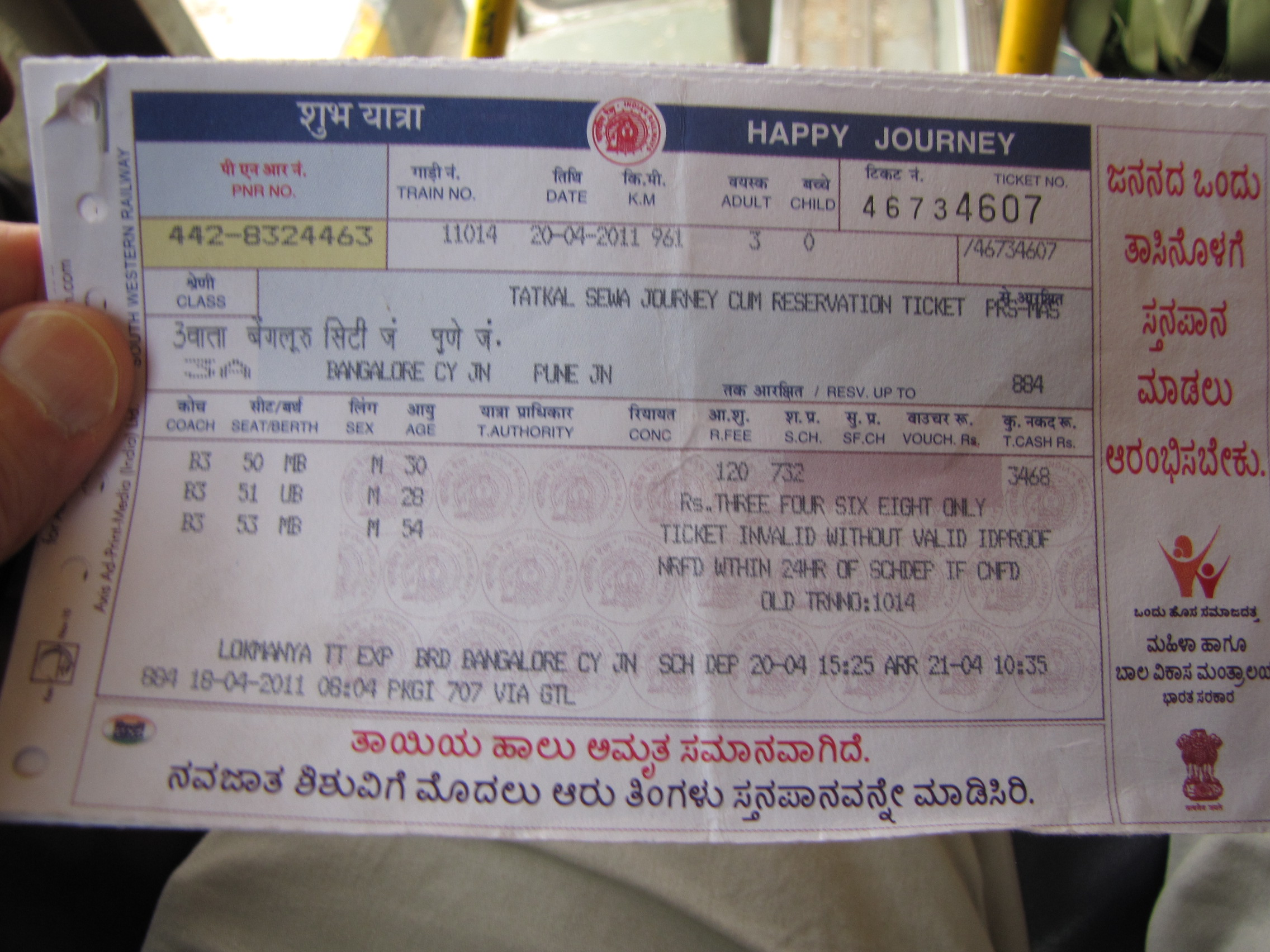
A standard printed Indian Railway ticket

In 1986, computerized ticketing and reservations were introduced before which ticketing was done manually. Self-printing ticket machines (SPTM) were introduced in 1988. Centralized computer reservation system was deployed in September 1996. The ticketing network at stations is computerized with the exception of few stations. The Indian Railways website went online in February 2000 and online ticketing was introduced on 3 August 2002 through IRCTC. Indian Railways now provides multiple channels for passengers to book tickets through website, smartphone apps, SMS, rail reservation counters at train stations, or through private ticket booking counters. Reserved tickets may be booked up to 120 days in advance and confirmed reservation tickets will show the passenger and fare details along with berth or seat number(s) allocated to them on the ticket.

In case of no confirmed reservation, a wait-list number is assigned and wait-listed tickets get confirmed if there are cancellations of already reserved tickets. Reservation against cancellation tickets is an intermediate category between the waiting and confirmed lists in sleeper classes which allows a ticket holder to board the train and share a berth. Reserved tickets can be booked by passengers who want to travel at short notice at higher fares through the Tatkal train ticket, where no refund is applicable on cancellation. A valid proof for the purchase of ticket along with photo identification is required to board the train. Unreserved tickets for short distance or unplanned travels may be purchased at stations or through UTS mobile app at any time before departure. Holders of such tickets may only board the general or unreserved coaches. India has some of the lowest train fares in the world, and lower class passenger fares are subsidised. Discounted fares are applicable for railway employees, senior citizens (over age 60), the disabled, students, athletes, patients and those taking competitive examinations. Seats of lower class of accommodation are reserved for women or senior citizens in some trains.

== Higher-speed rail ==
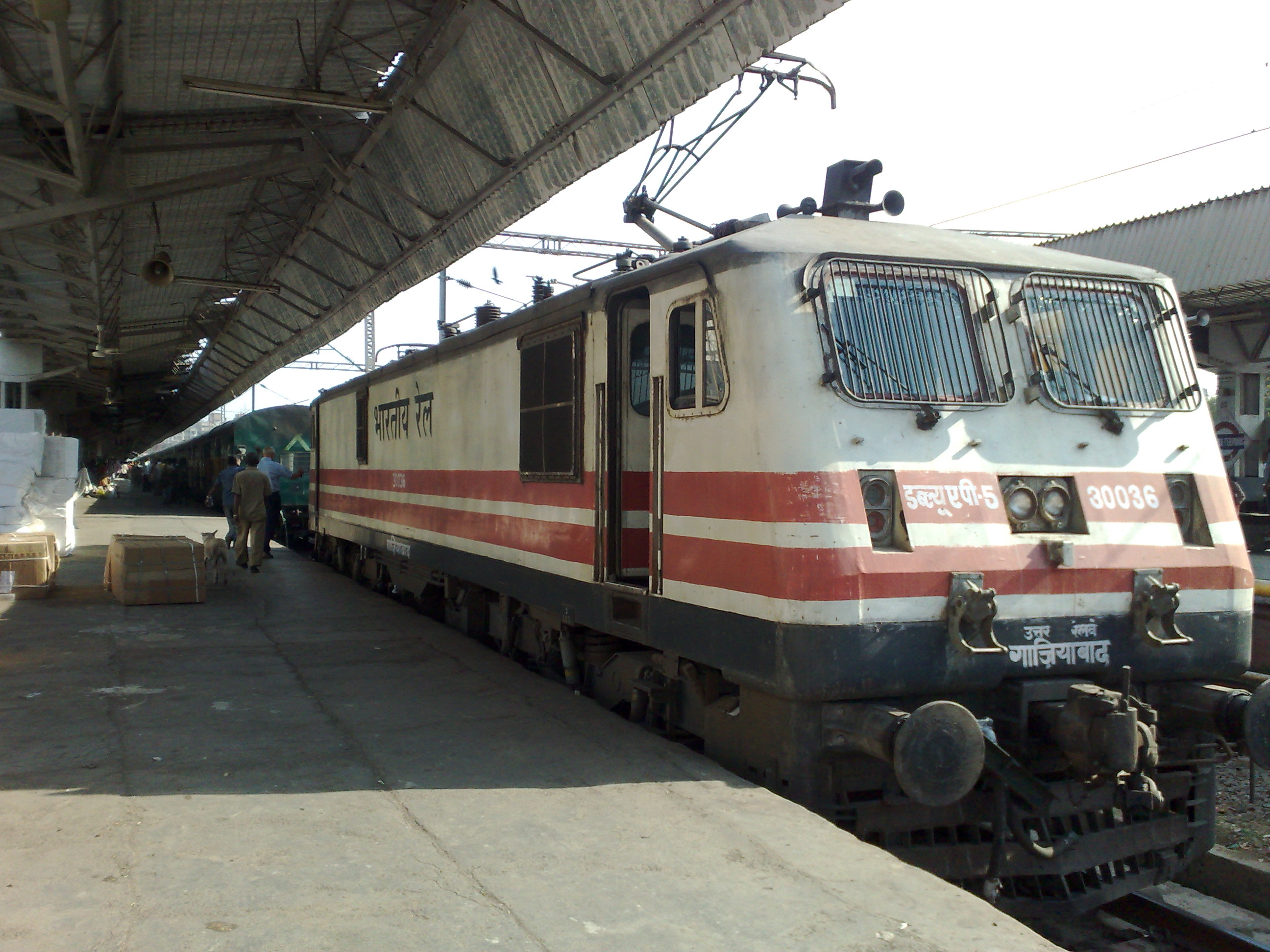
A WAP-5 electric locomotive reached a speed of 184 km/h (114 mph) and is the fastest operational locomotive

=== Rolling stock ===
In 1980, the WAP-1 electric locomotives reached a speed of 130 km/h (81 mph). WAP-5 class locomotives, initially imported from ABB in 1995 and later manufactured at Chittaranjan Locomotive Works in India, reached 184 km/h (114 mph) in trials. The locomotive later set an Indian speed record by hauling a train between Delhi and Agra at a speed of 160 km/h (99 mph) in 2014. In 2018, a modified WAP-5A locomotive reached speeds of 200 km/h (120 mph) in trials. In 2018, Integral Coach Factory in Chennai, rolled out a semi-high-speed EMU trainset, capable of reaching 180 km/h (110 mph). These trains have eight or sixteen coaches with driver cabins on both ends, which eliminates the time needed for turnaround at the terminal station with faster acceleration and deceleration, enabling the train to travel at a top speed for longer distance. For high-speed rail, the Indian railways will construct bullet train assembly facilities on a public-private participation (PPP) model with Japanese companies setting up manufacturing facilities in India to build the parts for bullet train sets.

=== Network and infrastructure ===
Proposed high speed rail network

In 2009, Indian Railways envisioned a plan to increase the speed of passenger trains to 160–200 km/h (99–124 mph) on dedicated conventional tracks and improve the existing conventional lines on 1,676 mm (5 ft 6 in) Broad gauge to handle speeds of up to 160 km/h (99 mph). On 25 July 2013, Government of India established the High Speed Rail Corporation under Rail Vikas Nigam for the implementation of high-speed rail corridor projects. In 2014, the Diamond Quadrilateral high-speed rail network project was launched by Government of India and is envisioned to connect the four major metro cities of India namely: Chennai, Delhi, Kolkata and Mumbai. As of 2023, India does not have any operational high-speed tracks with the 174 km (108 mi) segment of track in the Tughlakabad– Agra Cantonment section supporting semi-high speeds of up to 160 km/h (99 mph). By 2026, Ministry of Railways envisaged to have top speeds of 300–350 km/h (190–220 mph) with trains running on elevated corridors to isolate high-speed train tracks to prevent trespassing. Multiple feasibility studies have been done and probable routes have been identified. In 2017, a 508 km (316 mi) standard-gauge line between Mumbai and Ahmedabad was approved for construction and is expected to be operational by 2028. RapidX system operating on 1,435 mm (4 ft 8 1/2 in) standard-gauge tracks with Namo Bharat train-sets capable of supporting speeds of up to 180 km/h (110 mph), became operational with the partial opening of Delhi–Meerut line in 2023.

=== Services ===
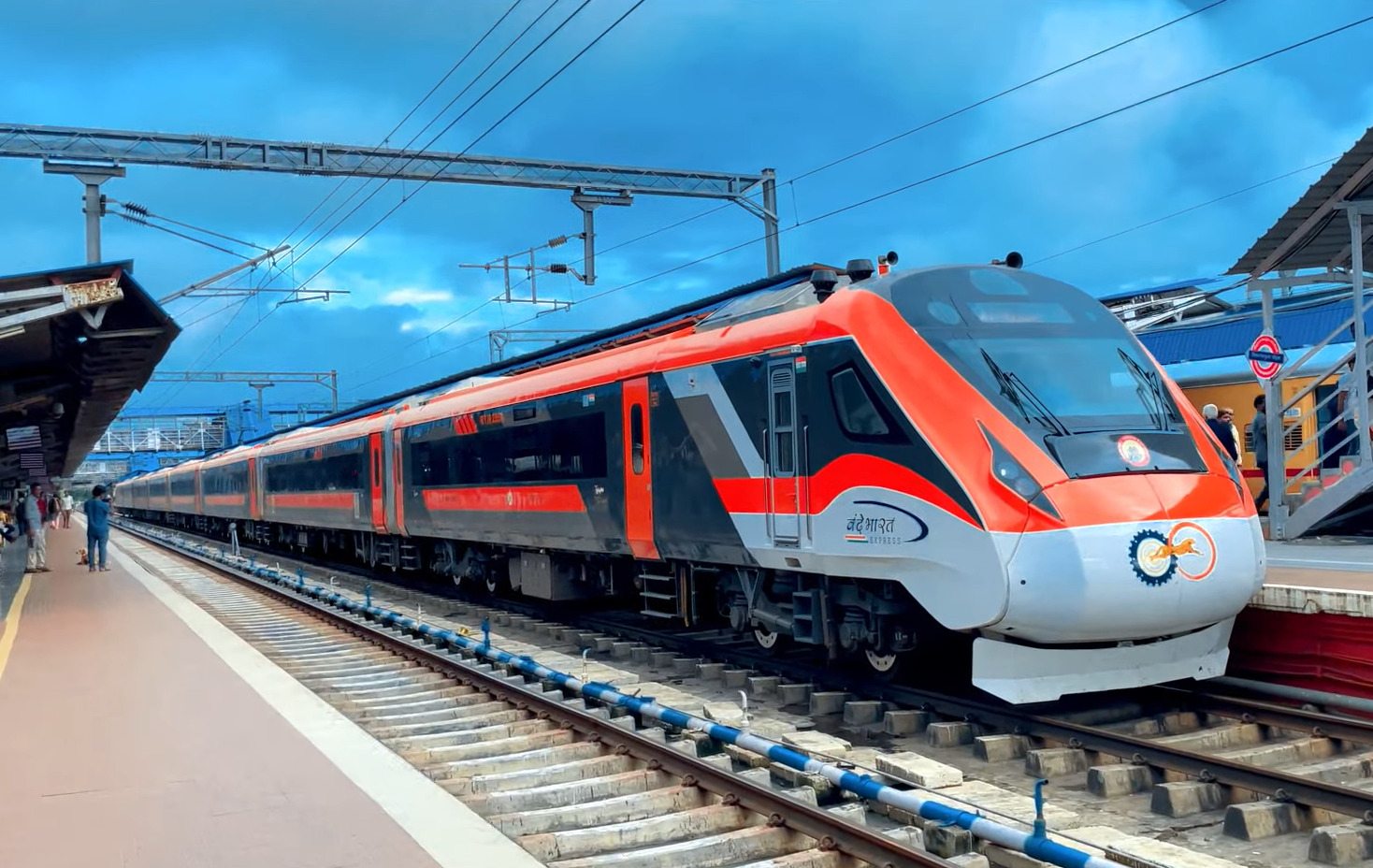
Introduced in 2019, Vande Bharat train-set built by ICF, is the fastest in operation

Rajdhani Express, introduced in 1969 with a maximum speed of 120 km/h (75 mph) was the fastest train service in the country in the 1970s. Shatabdi Express introduced in 1988, were capable of running at a maximum speed of 130 km/h (81 mph). In April 2016, WAP-5 hauled Gatiman Express became the fastest commercial train in India, with a maximum operational speed of 160 km/h (99 mph). In 2019, the first Vande Bharat Express entered commercial service with a maximum operational speed of 160 km/h (99 mph). The actual operating speed was much lower due to track restrictions and congestion with top speeds restricted to 130 km/h (81 mph) for most trains. In October 2023, Namo Bharat, built for RapidX by Alstom was launched and is capable of reaching speeds of up to 180 km/h (110 mph). In December 2023, two modified WAP-5 locomotives were used to haul the Amrit Bharat Express in a push-pull configuration, capable of reaching speeds of up to 160 km/h (99 mph).

== Suburban ==
=== Rolling stock ===
In the 1960s, electric multiple units (EMU) were developed for short-haul and suburban rail transit. On short-distance routes, Mainline electrical multiple unit (MEMU) and diesel electrical multiple unit (DEMU) trains are also run. These train sets run in formation of 6, 9, 12 or 15 coaches and a three-car set is typified by a motor coaches and two passenger coaches. These train-sets are self-propelled with capability for faster acceleration or deceleration.

=== Network ===
Suburban lines were built starting with Bombay in 1853, followed by Calcutta and Madras in the later years. The first 1.5kV DC electrified tracks became operational in the late 1920s and early 1930s. In 1957, 25 kV AC traction was adopted for suburban lines.

System	City	State	Image	Lines	Stations	Length	Opened
Mumbai Suburban	Mumbai, Thane	Maharashtra		7	154	427.5 km (265.6 mi)	1853
Kolkata Suburban	Kolkata	West Bengal		5	458	1,501 km (933 mi)	1854
Chennai Suburban	Chennai	Tamil Nadu		5	53	212 km (132 mi)	1928
Delhi Suburban	Delhi	National Capital Territory		1	46	85 km (53 mi)	1975
Chennai MRTS	Chennai	Tamil Nadu		1	21	24.2 km (15.0 mi)	1995
Hyderabad MMTS	Hyderabad	Telangana		2	44	90 km (56 mi)	2003
Pune Suburban	Pune, Pimpri-Chinchwad	Maharashtra		1	17	63 km (39 mi)	1978

=== Services ===
The first suburban electric trains were introduced in Bombay in 1925. Chennai suburban started operating in 1931 and Kolkata in 1957. Opened in November 1995, Chennai MRTS became the first operational elevated railway line in India. Indian Railways operates suburban railway systems across the cities of Mumbai (suburban), Chennai (suburban and MRTS), Kolkata (suburban) and Secunderabad (MMTS) covering six railway zones. Suburban networks issue unreserved tickets valid for a limited time or season passes with unlimited travel between two stops for a period of time.

== Metro ==
=== Rolling stock ===
Metro trains use electric multiple unit train-sets manufactured by various state-owned and private companies. The trains operate on 25 KV AC through an overhead catenary system with a maximum speed of 120 km/h (75 mph).

=== Network ===
Metro or Rapid transit systems in India form a major backbone of Urban rail transit in India, with the country boasting the presence of fourth longest length of metro lines with 895 km (556 mi). These systems mostly use standard-gauge tracks except a single line of Kolkata Metro and three lines of Delhi Metro which use the same broad-gauge tracks as mainline railways. These systems are operated by rail corporations independent of Indian Railways. All metro routes are electrified with DC or 25 kV AC traction with many metro routes employing the third rail method for electric traction.

As of 23 April 2026

List of current operational systems in India
System	Area served	Lines Operational	Stations	Length		Opened	Annual Ridership (in millions)
System	Area served	Lines Operational	Stations	Operational	Under Construction	Opened	Annual Ridership (in millions)
Agra Metro	Agra	1	6	5.2 km (3.2 mi)	24.47 km (15.20 mi)	6 March 2024	—N/a
Ahmedabad Metro	Ahmedabad, Gandhinagar, GIFT City	4	54	67.56 km (41.98 mi)	—N/a	4 March 2019	51.03 (2025^{*})
Bhoj Metro	Bhopal	1	8	6.22 km (3.86 mi)	21.68 km (13.47 mi)	21 December 2025	—N/a
Chennai Metro	Chennai Metropolitan Area	2	42	54.1 km (33.6 mi)	118.9 km (73.9 mi)	29 June 2015	111.9 (2025)
Delhi Metro	Delhi NCR	10	271	374.47 km (232.68 mi)	65.2 km (40.5 mi)	24 December 2002	2032.3 (2024^{*})
Hyderabad Metro	Hyderabad Metropolitan Region	3	59	67 km (42 mi)	—N/a	29 November 2017	178.00 (2024^{*})
Indore Metro	Indore	1	5	6 km (3.7 mi)	31.23 km (19.41 mi)	31 May 2025	—N/a
Jaipur Metro	Jaipur	1	11	11.98 km (7.44 mi)	2.85 km (1.77 mi)	3 June 2015	20.05 (2024^{*})
Kanpur Metro	Kanpur	1	14	16 km (9.9 mi)	15.05 km (9.35 mi)	28 December 2021	11.06 (2024)
Kochi Metro	Kochi	1	25	27.96 km (17.37 mi)	11.2 km (7.0 mi)	17 June 2017	36.52 (2024)
Kolkata Metro	Greater Kolkata	5	58	73.42 km (45.62 mi)	30.8 km (19.1 mi)	24 October 1984	225.5 (2025)
Lucknow Metro	Lucknow	1	21	22.9 km (14.2 mi)	—N/a	5 September 2017	31.15 (2024^{*}) (Note: Figure extrapolated from average daily ridership figures)
Mumbai Metro	Mumbai Metropolitan Region	4	79	90.48 km (56.22 mi)	122.07 km (75.85 mi)	8 June 2014	273.75 (2024)
Meerut Metro	Meerut	1	13	23.6 km (14.7 mi)	—N/a	22 February 2026	—N/a
Nagpur Metro	Nagpur	2	37	38.22 km (23.75 mi)	43 km (27 mi)	8 March 2019	33.88 (2024^{*})
Namma Metro	Bengaluru	3	85	96.1 km (59.7 mi)	79.44 km (49.36 mi)	20 October 2011	278.54 (2024^{*})
Navi Mumbai Metro	Navi Mumbai	1	11	11.1 km (6.9 mi)	—N/a	17 November 2023	0.94 (2024–25) (Note: Total figures from November 2023 to January 2024)
Noida Metro	Noida, Greater Noida	1	21	29.7 km (18.5 mi)	—N/a	25 January 2019	22.03 (2024)
Patna Metro	Patna	1	3	4.3 km (2.7 mi)	32.91 km (20.45 mi)	6 October 2025	—N/a
Pune Metro	Pune Metropolitan Region	2	29	31.25 km (19.42 mi)	79.56 km (49.44 mi)	6 March 2022	67.1 (2025)
Rapid Metro	Gurgaon	1	11	12.1 km (7.5 mi)	28.5 km (17.7 mi)	14 November 2013	14.60 (2024^{*})
Total		47	863	1,070.06 km (664.90 mi)	717.24 km (445.67 mi)	—N/a	3370.72

Table note

^* Indicates ridership figures based on the fiscal year rather than the calendar year.

== Others ==
=== Mountain railways ===
Mountain railways of India

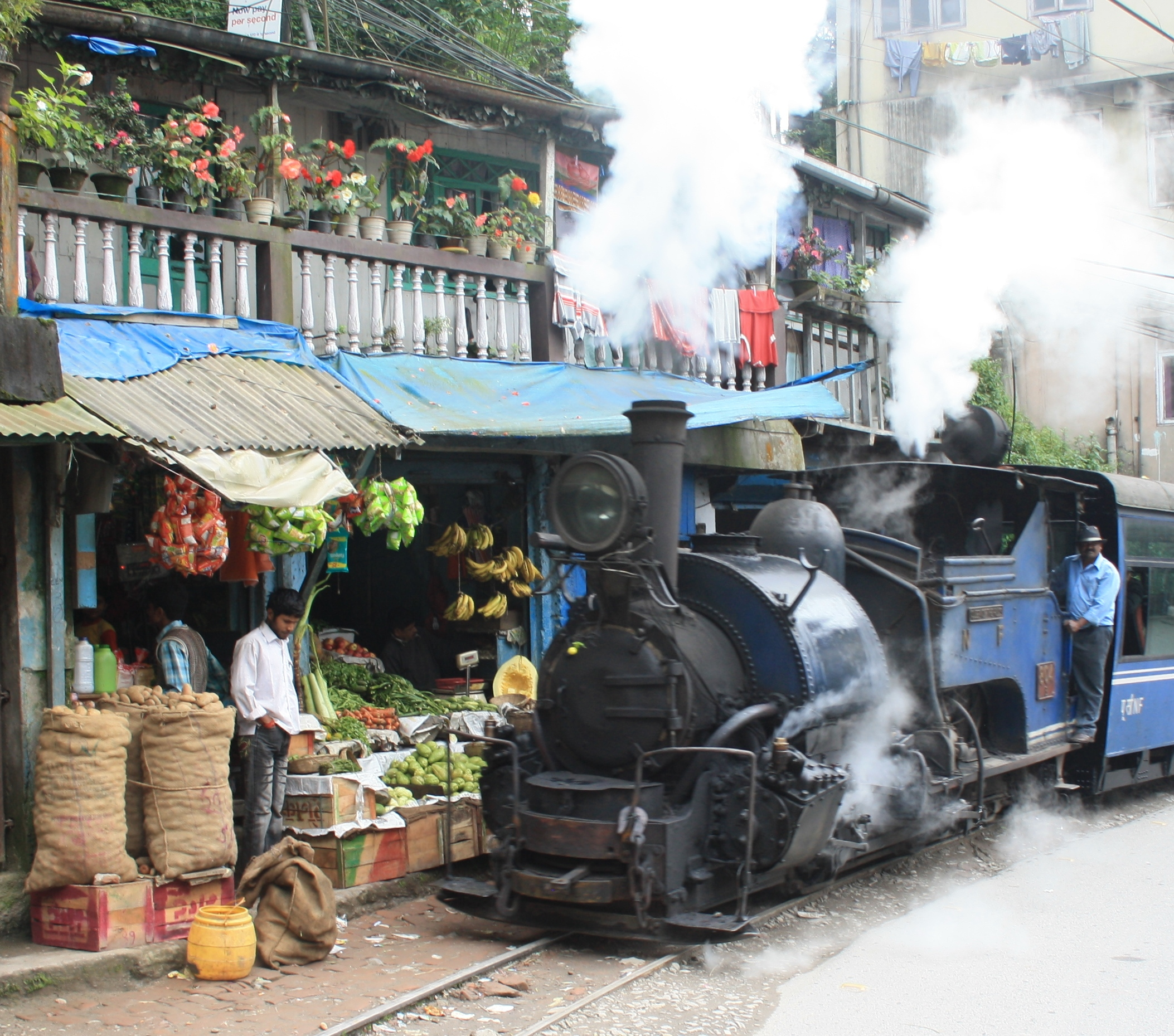
Darjeeling

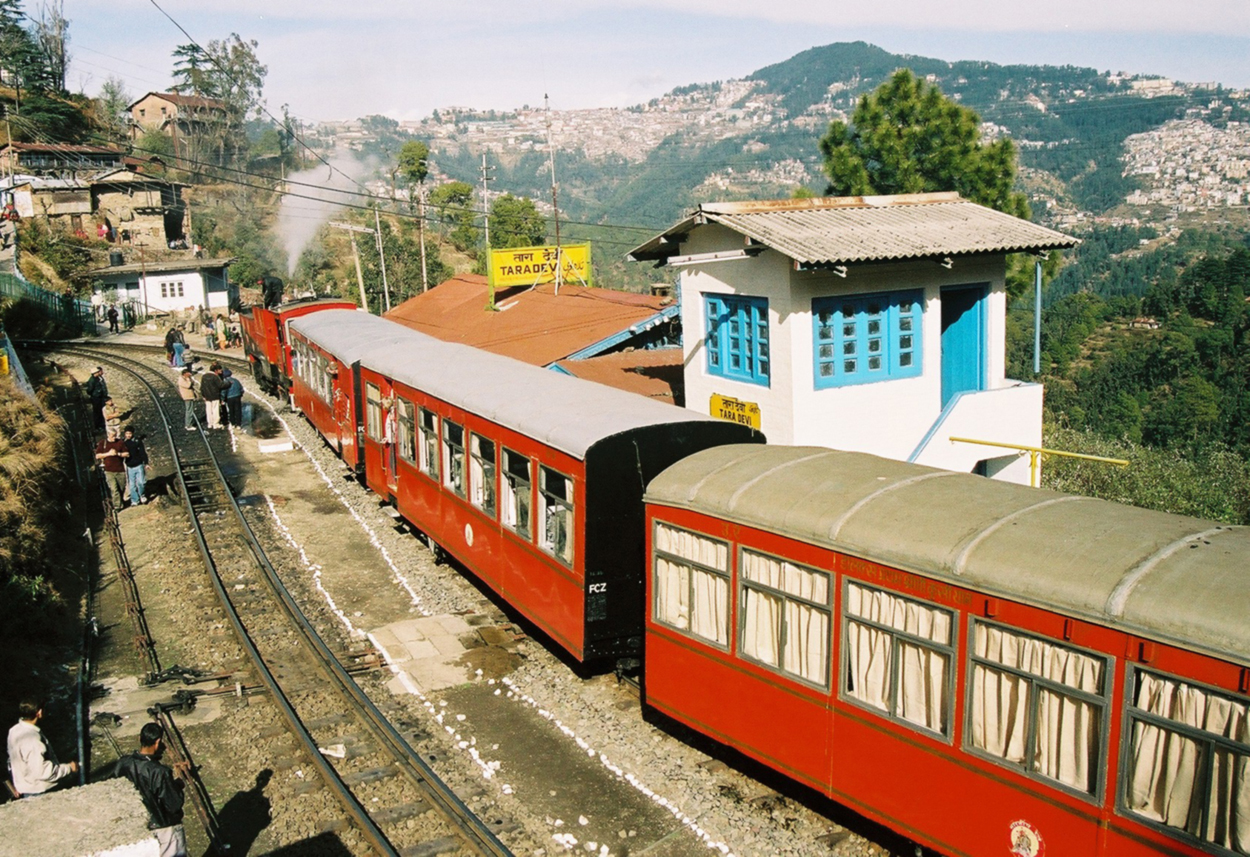
Kalka–Shimla

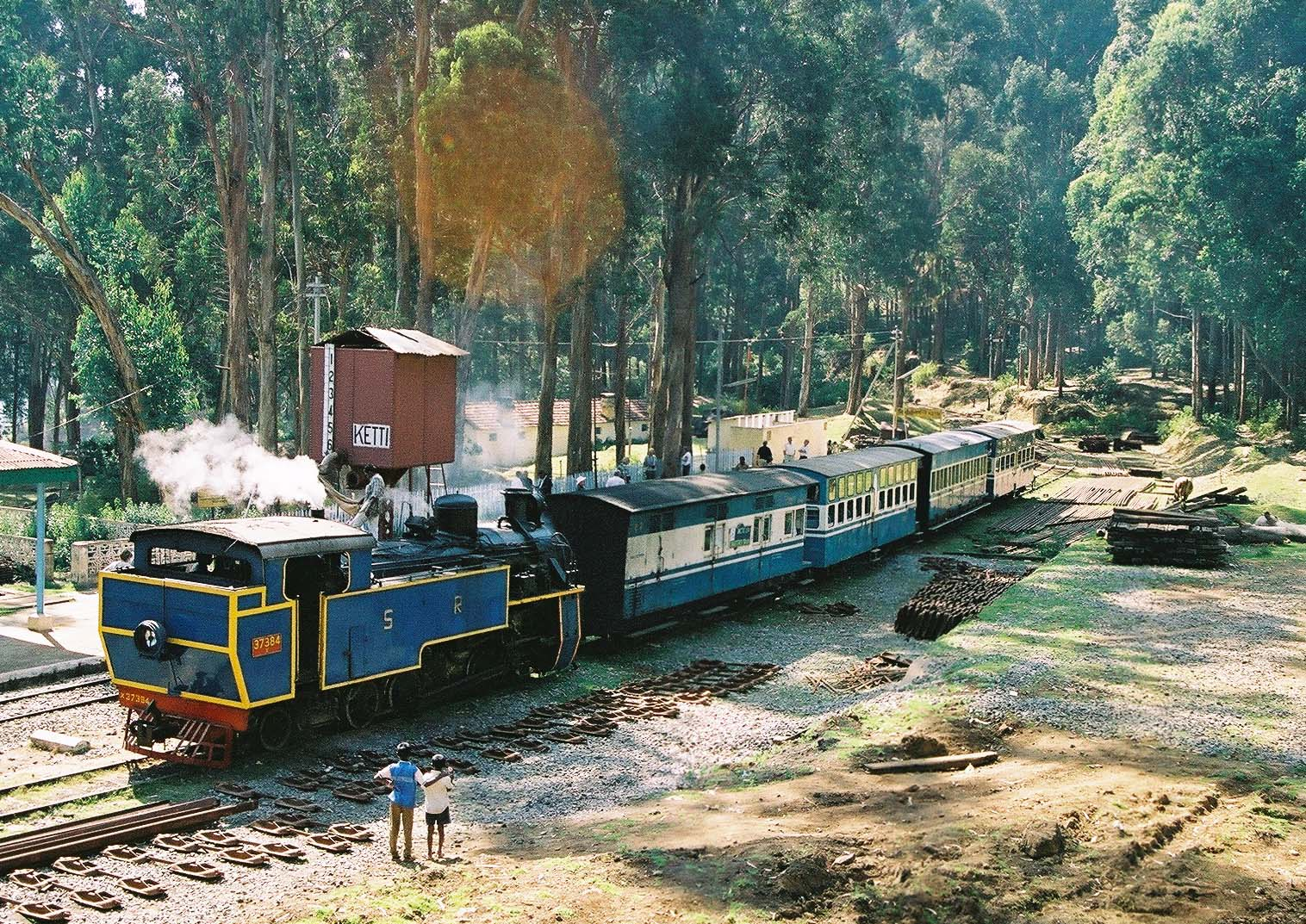
Nilgiri

Mountain railways of India refer to three rail lines operated by Indian Railways in hilly terrain. Darjeeling Himalayan Railway, a 610 mm (2 ft) narrow-gauge railway in the Lesser Himalayas of West Bengal was opened in 1881. The mountain railways were designated as World Heritage Sites in 1999. The Kalka–Shimla Railway, a 762 mm (2 ft 6 in) narrow-gauge railway in the Sivalik Hills of Himachal Pradesh started operating in 1903. The Nilgiri Mountain Railway, a 1,000 mm (3 ft 3 3/8 in) metre gauge rack railway in the Nilgiri Hills of Tamil Nadu was opened in 1908 and is the only operational rack railway in India. These railways operate with its own dedicated fleet of locomotives and coaches.

=== Tourist trains ===
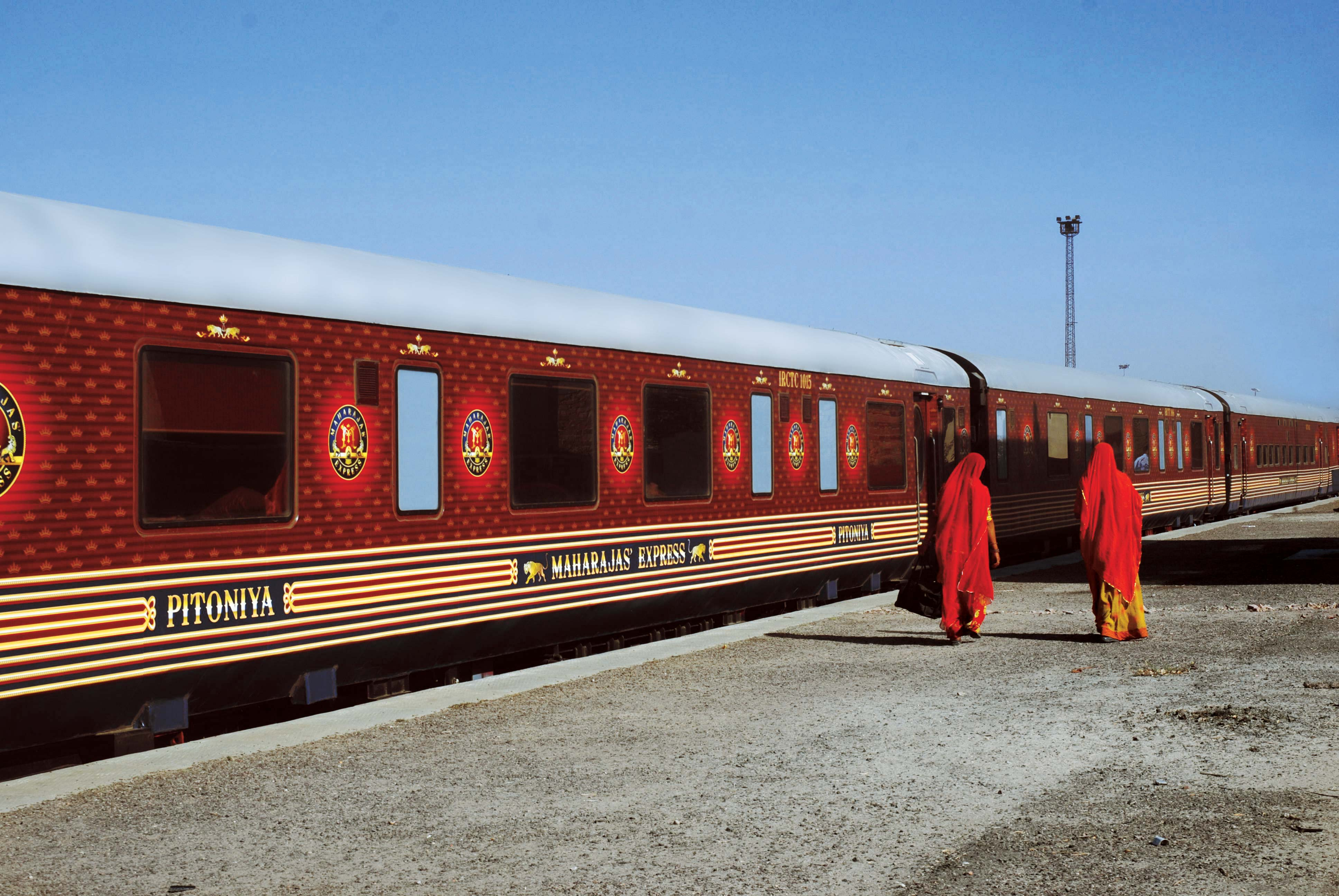
Maharajas' Express

Indian Railways operates tourist trains and coach services on popular tourist circuits in different regions of the country. It operates luxury tourist trains such as Maharajas' Express, Palace on Wheels, Golden Chariot and Deccan Odyssey, deluxe tourist trains such as Mahaparinirvan Express. It also operates heritage and exhibition trains on special circumstances.

=== Cross-border services ===
India shares land border with multiple countries and have rail-links with some of them. Bangladesh is connected to West Bengal with a construction of new rail link connecting Tripura with Akhaura. Two rail links to Nepal exist as of 2021, with a third under construction. There is an existing railink with Pakistan through Attari–Wagah border.

=== Private railways ===
The state-owned Indian Railways has an almost monopoly over rail operations. There are a few private railway lines used exclusively for transporting freight and to connect with the wider network. Private railways are operated by various ports such as Mumbai, Kolkata, Chennai, Visakhapatnam, Pipavav and the Bhilai Steel Plant. The Tata Group operates a few funicular railways. In 2020, Indian Railways allowed the operation of private passenger trains for the first time with the first train flagged off from Coimbatore in June 2022.

=== Specialised coaches ===
Apart from standard passenger and freight services, the Indian Railways operates other specialised coaches with various functions. These include accident relief medical vans, military cars, inspection carriages, and parcel vans. Various coaches such as pantry car, generator cars, and brake vans are attached to train-sets.

== Manufacturing and maintenance ==
Indian Railways operates various manufacturing units. Chittaranjan Locomotive Works (CLW), commissioned in 1950, was the first locomotive manufacturing unit in India. The first rail coache manufacturing unit, the Integral Coach Factory (ICF) was established at Madras in 1956. Banaras Locomotive Works (BLW), commissioned in 1961, is the second locomotive manufacturing unit operated by Indian Railways. Bharat Heavy Electricals Limited (BHEL), Patiala Locomotive Works, Diesel Locomotive Factory, Marhowrah and Electric Locomotive Factory, Madhepura also manufacture locomotives in India. Railway coaches are also manufactured at coach factories at Karputhala, Raebareli, Sonipat and Latur. Indian Railways also operates two rail wheel manufacturing factories at Bangalore and Chhpra. The locomotives are operated and maintained by 44 locomotive sheds. Indian Railways also maintains 37 sheds for the maintenance of multiple unit train-sets. The repair and maintenance of the fleet of other rolling stock is carried out at 212 carriage & wagon repair units and 45 periodic overhaul workshops across various zones of IR. Metro coaches are manufactured by various companies including state-owned ICF, BEML and private companies like Alstom, Mitsubishi, Hyundai Rotem, Bombardier, Siemens, CRRC, Titagarh Firema and CAF with the respective metro systems maintaining their own maintenance depots.

== Accidents and incidents ==
According to the India's National Crime Records Bureau, in 2021, more than 16,000 people were killed in almost 18,000 railway accidents across India. Almost 68 percent of the railway accidents were due to falls from trains and collisions between trains and people on the track. In the same year, almost 2000 people were killed in around 1500 rail-road crossing accidents across India.

== See also ==
Rail transport

- List of railway lines in India
- List of railway stations in India
- List of high-speed railway lines in India
- Dedicated freight corridors in India
- Urban rail transit in India
- High-speed rail in India
- Future of rail transport in India
- List of countries by rail transport network size

Other

- Transport in India
- Air transport in India
- Bharatmala
- Expressways of India
- Water transport in India
