= Yellow Line (Indore Metro) =

Mass transit system in Madhya Pradesh, India

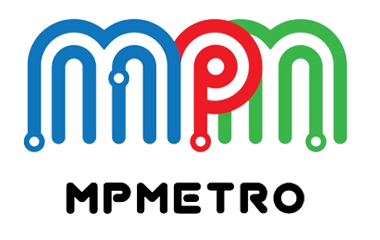

Overview
- Status: Operational
- Locale: Indore, Madhya Pradesh, India
- Termini: Devi Ahilya Bai Holkar Terminal; Malviya Nagar Chauraha (further extended to Airport)
- Stations: Operational: 16; Under Construction: 13; Total: 29

Service
- Type: Rapid transit
- System: Indore Metro
- Operator: Madhya Pradesh Metro Rail Corporation Limited
- Depot: Gandhi Nagar
- Rolling stock: Alstom Movia
- Daily ridership: 50,000 + daily ridership

History
- Opened: 31 May 2025; 15 months ago

Technical
- Line length: 33.53 km (20.83 mi) (Planned); 16.21 km (10.07 mi) (Operational); 17.32 km (10.76 mi) (Approved)
- Number of tracks: 2
- Character: Elevated & Underground
- Track gauge: 1,435 mm (4 ft 8 1/2 in) standard gauge
- Electrification: 750 V DC third rail
- Operating speed: 90 km/h (56 mph) (Top); 32 km/h (20 mph) (average)
Route Map
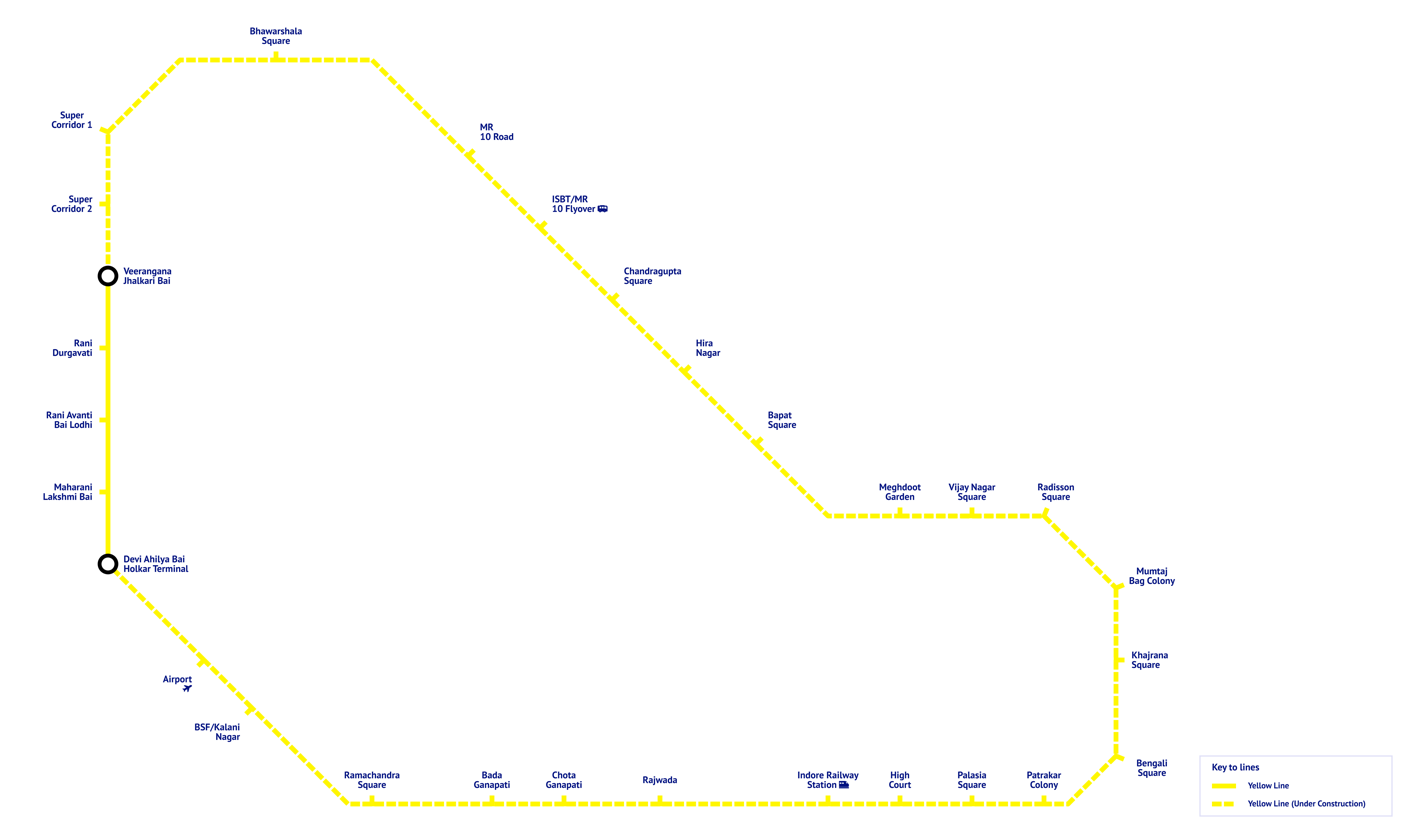

The Yellow Line is the first rapid transit line of the Indore Metro, which consists of a total of 29 metro stations from Devi Ahilya Bai Holkar Terminal to Airport with a total distance of 33.53 km.

A 6 km priority corridor, linking Devi Ahilya Bai Holkar Terminal to Veerangana Jhalkari Bai Station entered operations on 31 May 2025 and it was officially inaugurated by Prime Minister Narendra Modi via video conferencing from Bhopal, the capital city of Madhya Pradesh. The priority corridor-2 from Super Corridor 2 to Radisson Square was inaugurated on 5 September 2026 with regular service starting on 6 September 2026.

== History ==
The Indore Metro project was undertaken to meet the increasing urban transport demands of Indore, the largest city in the state of Madhya Pradesh, India. The process commenced with the submission of the Detailed Project Report (DPR) by Rohit Associates Cities & Rails Pvt. Ltd., which received approval from the central government in October 2018. Later, the foundation stone of the project was laid in September 2019, and construction work started.

The project was initially intended to be financed partly by an official development assistance (ODA) loan by the Japan International Cooperation Agency (JICA). This financing was, however, rejected by JICA in March 2017. In turn, the Asian Development Bank (ADB) gave in-principle approval to finance the project in May 2019, on which the Union Government would be a guarantor for the loan. The New Development Bank (NDB) also pledged $225 million for the project.

Construction of the Yellow Line was undertaken as part of the Phase-1 expansion of the Indore Metro, aimed to cover the city's most busy transport corridors. The project was supported by funding from institutions such as the Asian Infrastructure Investment Bank (AIIB). A 6 km section was opened in 2025, with the overall completion to be completed in 2026.

== Funding ==
Indore Metro is a major infrastructure project to redesign the urban mobility of Indore. The estimated cost of the project is about ₹15,000 crore with the cost per kilometer at ₹182 crore. The project funding is taken from various sources:

- Asian Development Bank (ADB): The ADB gave in-principle approval to finance the Indore Metro project in May 2019. The Union Government will be a guarantor of the loan.
- New Development Bank (NDB): The NDB pledged $225 million for the project.
- State Government of Madhya Pradesh: The state government allocated ₹262 crore in the 2021-22 budget for Indore and Bhopal metro project development.
- Central Government: Central government has also provided funding to the project.
- European Investment Bank (EIB): In October 2022, government officials from Madhya Pradesh Metro Rail Corporation Limited (MPMRCL) stated that the initial tranche of a $250 million loan by the EIB was expected to be disbursed in the first quarter of 2023.

== List of stations ==
Yellow Line
#	Station Name		Opened	Connections	Station Type	Platform Type
#	English	Hindi	Opened	Connections	Station Type	Platform Type
1	Devi Ahilya Bai Holkar Terminal Station	देवी अहिल्या बाई होल्कर टर्मिनल	31 May 2025	None	Elevated	Side + Island
2	Maharani Lakshmi Bai	महारानी लक्ष्मी बाई	31 May 2025	None	Elevated	Side
3	Rani Avanti Bai Lodhi	रानी अवंती बाई लोधी	31 May 2025	None	Elevated	Side
4	Rani Durgavati	रानी दुर्गावती	31 May 2025	None	Elevated	Side
5	Veerangana Jhalkari Bai	वीरांगना झलकारी बाई	31 May 2025	None	Elevated	Side
6	Super Corridor 2	सुपर कॉरिडोर 2	6 September 2026	None	Elevated	Side
7	Super Corridor 1	सुपर कॉरिडोर 1	6 September 2026	None	Elevated	Side
8	Bhawarshala Chauraha	भावरशाला चौराहा	6 September 2026	None	Elevated	Side
9	MR 10 Road	एमआर 10 रोड	6 September 2026	None	Elevated	Side
10	ISBT	आईएसबीटी	6 September 2026	ISBT Indore	Elevated	Side
11	Chandragupta Chauraha	चंद्रगुप्त चौराहा	6 September 2026	None	Elevated	Side
12	Hira Nagar	हीरा नगर	6 September 2026	None	Elevated	Side
13	Bapat Chauraha	बापट चौराहा	6 September 2026	None	Elevated	Side
14	Meghdoot Garden	मेघदूत गार्डन	6 September 2026	None	Elevated	Side
15	Vijay Nagar Chauraha	विजय नगर चौराहा	6 September 2026	None	Elevated	Side
16	Malviya Nagar Chauraha	मालवीय नगर चौराहा	6 September 2026	None	Elevated	Side
17	Mumtaj Bag Colony	मुमताज बाग कॉलोनी	Approved	None	Elevated	TBD
18	Khajrana Square	खजराना चौराहा	Approved	None	Elevated	TBD
19	Bengali Square	बंगाली चौराहा	Approved	None	Elevated	TBD
20	Patrakar Colony	पत्रकार कॉलोनी	Approved	None	Elevated	TBD
21	Palasia Square	पलासिया चौराहा	Approved	None	Underground	Island
22	High Court	हाई कोर्ट	Approved	None	Underground	Island
23	Indore Railway Station	इंदौर रेलवे स्टेशन	Under construction	Indore Junction	Underground	Island
24	Rajwada	राजवाड़ा	Under construction		Underground	Island
25	Chota Ganpati	छोटा गणपति	Under construction		Underground	Island
26	Bada Ganpati	बड़ा गणपति	Under construction		Underground	Island
27	Ramachandra Square	रामचन्द्र चौराहा	Under construction		Underground	Island
28	BSF/Kalani Nagar	बी एस एफ / कलानी नगर	Under construction		Underground	Island
29	Airport	एयरपोर्ट	Under construction	Devi Ahilya Bai Holkar Airport	Underground	Island

== See also ==
- Indore
- List of rapid transit systems in India
- List of metro systems
