= Indore Metro =

Rapid transit system in Indore, India

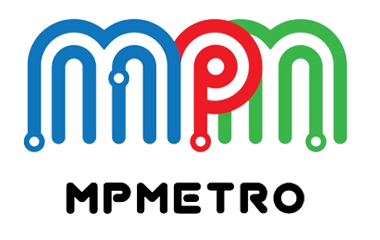
- MPMRCL Logo

- Train at Devi Ahilya Bai Holkar Terminal

Overview
- Owner: Madhya Pradesh Metro Rail Corporation Limited
- Locale: Indore, Madhya Pradesh, India
- Transit type: Rapid transit
- Number of lines: 4 (Planned) and 1 Operational
- Line number: Yellow Line
- Number of stations: 16 (Operational); 13 (Contract Awarded); 29 (Total Stations)
- Website: MPMRCL

Operation
- Began operation: 31 May 2025; 17 months ago
- Train length: 3 coaches

Technical
- System length: 33.53 km (20.83 mi) (Total - Yellow Line) 16.72 km (10.39 mi) (Operational - Yellow Line) 17.32 km (10.76 mi) (Under Construction Soon)
- Track gauge: 1,435 mm (4 ft 8 1/2 in) standard gauge
- Electrification: 750V DC Third rail
- Average speed: 44 km/h (27 mph)
- Top speed: 90 km/h (56 mph)
Network map
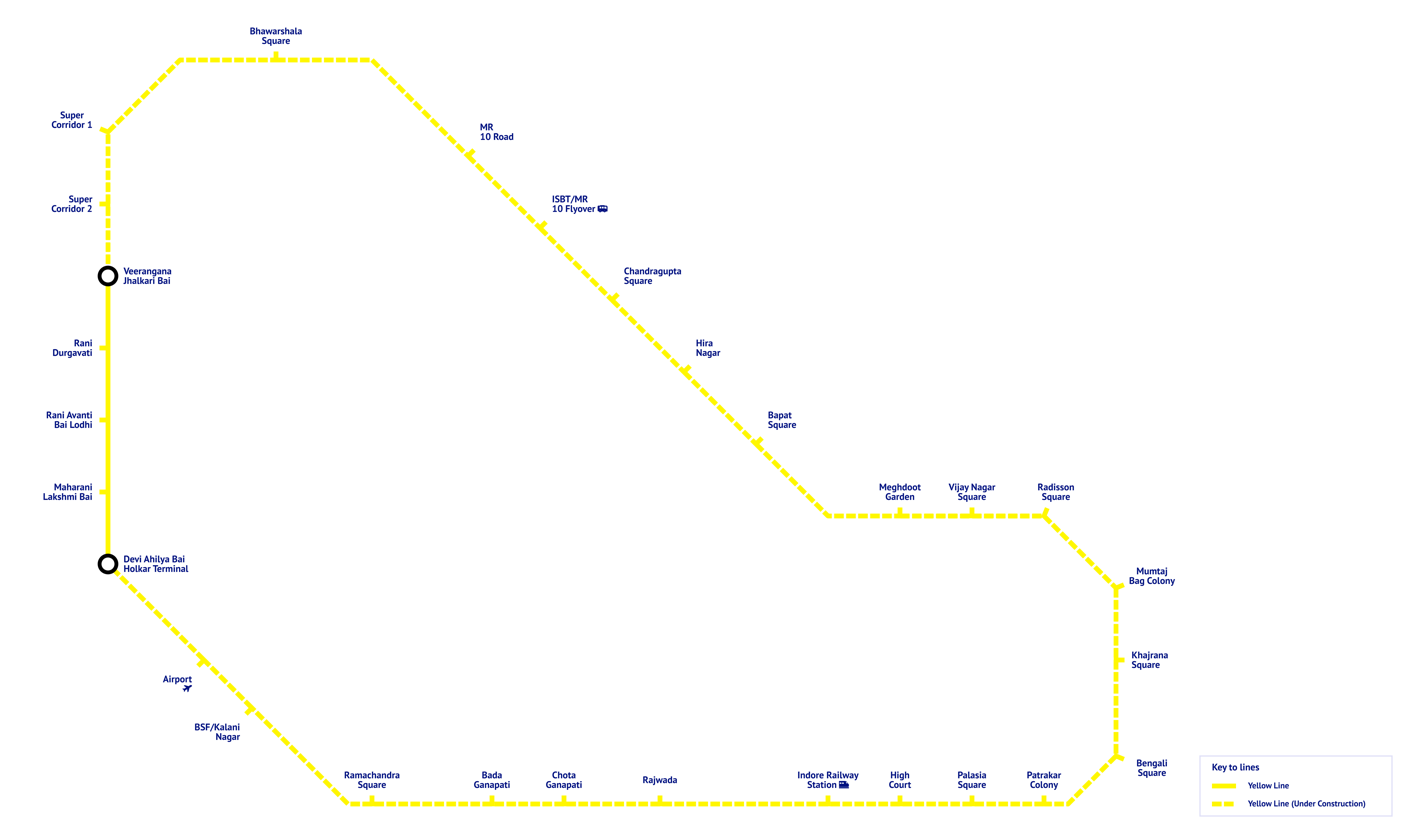

The Indore Metro is a rapid transit system serving Indore, the largest city in the state of Madhya Pradesh, India. The Yellow Line is the only one currently in operation. The full line will consist of more than 34 km from Devi Ahilya Bai Holkar Terminal to Airport. The first phase of the project was completed and inaugurated on 31 May 2025 by Prime Minister Narendra Modi on 300th Birth anniversary of Maharani Ahilyabai Holkar.

Four other corridors (lines) covering a distance of 124 kilometres (77 mi) have been proposed. The Yellow line project will cost approximately ₹12,000 crore (US$1.3 billion). The cost per km will be 182 crores and total cost is 15,000 crores. The metro system will be elevated, underground and at grade.

== Funding ==
On 1 May 2019, the Asian Development Bank (ADB) gave in-principle approval to fund the Indore Metro project. The Union Government will stand as guarantor for the loan.

== Construction Phases ==
DPR for Indore Metro Rail system is prepared by Rohit Associates Cities and Rails Private limited (erstwhile Rohit Associates Architects and Engineers Private limited) headed by Architect Rohit Gupta. Indore Metro rail is master planned and designed by Architect Rohit Gupta and his team as ultra-modern state-of-the-art driverless metro system. The total operational network planned by Architect Rohit Gupta which is described in detail in the DPR of Indore metro Rail prepared by Rohit Associates Cities and Rails Private limited is 124.43 km out of which the Ring line that is 31.55 km is under construction and partially trial run is already done. The complete master plan of the Indore metro rail can be seen in the DPR available with Ministry of Housing and urban affairs Government of India.

=== Phase 1 ===
The first phase of the Indore Metro project was approved by the Union Cabinet of India on 3 October 2018. The project included a proposed 31.55 km metro corridor with 30 stations at an estimated cost of ₹7,500.80 crore. The foundation stone for the project was laid by then Chief Minister of Madhya Pradesh Kamal Nath on 14 September 2019, marking the formal commencement of the project.

Construction of Phase 1 involved the development of elevated viaducts, metro stations, track infrastructure and associated railway systems. Initial civil works included foundation construction, erection of supporting pillars and installation of precast viaduct segments. Construction activities were affected by the COVID-19 pandemic, contributing to delays in the project's implementation.

In December 2021, Chief Minister Shivraj Singh Chouhan laid the foundation stones for additional construction packages involving approximately 11 km of elevated viaduct and 16 metro stations. These works formed part of the expansion of the Phase 1 corridor.

During construction, engineering challenges involving pile foundations required technical evaluation and modifications to the foundation design. Researchers from the Indian Institute of Technology Bombay assisted in addressing these issues.

On 30 September 2023, the first trial run of the Indore Metro was conducted along the Super Priority Corridor, marking a major milestone in the testing of the metro system.

Construction and testing continued throughout 2024 and early 2025. Following inspections of the completed infrastructure and railway systems, the initial corridor received safety clearance for commercial operations in April 2025.

On 31 May 2025, Prime Minister Narendra Modi inaugurated the approximately 6 km Super Priority Corridor between Gandhi Nagar and Super Corridor-3, marking the commencement of passenger services on the Indore Metro.

Construction continued on the remaining sections of Phase 1. On 5 September 2026, the approximately 11 km Reach-II corridor between Super Corridor-3 and Malviya Nagar Chauraha was inaugurated, extending the operational network to approximately 17 km with 16 stations.

Phase 1 network
No.	Line	Stations	Length (km)	Terminals		Status	Opening date
1	Yellow Line	5	6.3	Devi Ahilya Bai Holkar Terminal (Gandhi Nagar)	Veerangana Jhalkari Bai (Super Corridor-3)	Completed	31 May 2025
1	Yellow Line	11	12	Veerangana Jhalkari Bai (Super Corridor-3)	Malviya Nagar Chauraha	Completed	6 September 2026
1	Yellow Line	13	15.2	Malviya Nagar Chauraha	Airport	Under Construction	
Total		29	33.5				

== Lines ==
=== Yellow Line ===
The Yellow Line is being developed as a ring corridor, with elevated and underground sections. As of October 2026, approximately 17 km (11 mi) of the line is operational, connecting Gandhi Nagar with Malviya Nagar Chauraha through 16 stations. The remaining sections are under construction.

The initial Super Priority Corridor between Gandhi Nagar and Super Corridor-3, comprising five stations over approximately 6 km (3.7 mi), was inaugurated on 31 May 2025.

An approximately 11 km (6.8 mi) extension from Super Corridor-3 to Malviya Nagar Chauraha was inaugurated on 5 September 2026. Designated Phase I (Reach II), the extension added 11 stations, bringing the operational network to approximately 17 kilometres and 16 stations.

== Network ==
Indore Metro
No.	Line Name	Terminal		Station	Length	First Operational	Last Extension
1	Yellow Line	Devi Ahilya Bai Holkar Terminal Station	Malviya Nagar Chauraha	16	18.3 km (11.4 mi)	31 May 2025	6 September 2026
Total				16	18.3 km (11.4 mi)		

== Status updates ==
- Oct 2018: DPR prepared by Rohit Associates Cities & Rails Pvt. Ltd. is approved by central government.
- Aug 2019: Memorandum of Understanding (MoU) signed between central and state governments for Bhopal and Indore metro. State and central governments will bear 20% of the project cost each and remaining 60% will be funded by international banks. Indore metro to be operational by 2023. Construction work is ongoing as of 21 August 2019.
- Aug 2020: Minister of Madhya Pradesh Government pushes to start the tendering and civil engineering work for Indore Metro so that it can be inaugurated before August 2023.
- Mar 2021: Construction of Elevated Viaduct Between ISBT/MR10 And Mumtaj Bagh Colony Construction facing issues and delays due to disputes between GC and Dilip Buildcon. Tenders for construction of 9 Elevated Metro Stations and Elevated Viaduct on Line 3 (Yellow Line) from MR10 Road Station to Gandhi Nagar Station (10.9 km) and 7 Elevated Metro Stations and Elevated Viaduct on Line 3 (Yellow Line) from ISBT to Radisson Square are released and bids are invited. Soil testing for underground metro from Airport to Gandhi Hall begins.
- Dec 2021: Foundation stone for construction of 11 km viaduct of Phase I ring-line (total 31 km) laid again, along with proposed construction of 16 metro stations which are cumulatively worth Rs. 1,417 crores. Rail Vikas Nigam Limited (RVNL) has been awarded both the contracts. 16 firms submit bids for construction of Metro Depot at Gandhinagar. Contentions over shifting of Indore metro project in Seismic zone-IV category with allegations of benefiting certain business houses, continue to reflect fault lines and the future loss of revenue which government might suffer.
- Oct 2023: A trial run of the metro line was completed successfully in October 2023, signaling a major milestone in the completion of the project.
- Apr 2024: The final pre cast segments were completed, bringing the whole project closer to completion.
- May 2025: Prime Minister Narendra Modi inaugurated the priority corridor consisting of five stations.
- September 2026: Union Minister for Housing and Urban Affairs Shri Manohar Lal inaugurated the priority corridor-2 consisting of eleven stations.

== Controversies ==
=== Change in seismic zone ===
The Indore Metro project has been subject to serious contestation due to the change in seismic zone from zone II to zone IV which led to increase in costs for the entire project.

=== Funding ===
On 9 October 2015, the then Madhya Pradesh Chief Minister Shivraj Singh Chouhan had claimed to have received consent from Japan International Cooperation Agency (JICA) for Rs 12,000 crore loan at 0.3 percent interest rate for Bhopal and Indore Metro rail projects. However, during an update on 7 March 2017 it was revealed by state's Urban Administration and Development Minister Maya Singh that JICA has refused to fund the metro projects of Bhopal and Indore.

=== Fraud allegations ===
A newspaper claimed to have found discrepancies in billing by contractors amounting to Rs 110 crore, prompting an official investigation.

== See also ==
- Urban rail transit in India
  - Bhoj Metro (Bhopal)

== Notes ==
- "Proposed survey for Indore metro rail a right step: E Sreedharan – India – DNA". Dnaindia.com. 21 July 2010.
- "Indore, Bhopal metro systems may be automated, driverless". Archived from the original on 5 December 2014.
- "Propose Indore metro to have average speed of 35-40 km per hour". Archived from the original on 20 October 2014.
- "MP Metro projects get Rs 12,000-cr soft loan from Japan".
