= List of luxury trains in India =

Indian Railways (IR), Indian Railway Catering and Tourism Corporation (IRCTC) and different state governments provide a variety of luxury rail travel in India. These are:

Name	Image	Launch Year	Operators	Notes	Ref
Bharat Gaurav Trains		2021	IR & IRCTC	IR rolled out Bharat Gaurav Trains (theme-based Tourist Circuit train) to offer ICF rakes under "Right to Use" model for operations on different routes to registered service providers. Following two Bharat Gaurav Tourist Trains are currently being operated by IRCTC: Shri Ramayan Yatra: A 20-day journey to promote religious tourism under the Government's Dekho Apna Desh initiative. The train starts its journey of almost 7,500 km from Safdarjung (in Delhi) to Rameswaram (in Tamil Nadu) covering visits to all prominent places associated with the life of Lord Rama before arriving back at Safdarjung on 20th day.; South India Tour: A 13-day journey covering the prominent sacred and heritage destinations of Southern India. The train starts its journey from Safdarjung (in Delhi), making its first stop at Hyderabad and last stop at Ongole before arriving back at Safdarjung on 13th day.; Navratra darshan: The Indian Railway Catering and Tourism Corporation (IRCTC) launched the Navratri special Bharat Guarav train which will operate from Delhi to Katra.; India - Nepal tour: According to an official statement issued by the Indian Railway Catering and Tourism Corporation (IRCTC), from February 2023, Indian Railways will run its Bharat Gaurav Tourist Train on a route which will connect pilgrimage sites of Ayodhya in India and Janakpur in Nepal. The train will have a capacity of 600 persons and will cover major cities including Ayodhya, Buxar, Janakpur, Sitamarhi, Kashi, Prayag, Chitrakoot, Nasik, Hampi, Rameshwaram, Kanchipuram and Bhadrachalam.	
Deccan Odyssey		2004	MTDC & IR	The train is based on the Palace on Wheels concept to boost tourism on IR's Maharashtra route. The route begins in Mumbai and travels to cities like Ratnagiri, Sindhudurg, Goa, Kolhapur, Belgaon, Solapur, Aurangabad, Ajanta-Ellora Nasik and Pune. The route ends in Mumbai. It travels on six routes for a period of seven nights and eight days, and operates during the period October to April.	
Fairy Queen Express		1997	IR	Fairy Queen Express is a steam engine locomotive which runs between the Indian capital, New Delhi, and Alwar in the state of Rajasthan. It was built around 1855 and was one of the first train in India to offer luxurious train travel. It was certified by the Guinness Book of Records in 1998 as the world's oldest locomotive in regular operation after its restoration to haul a luxury train to increase tourism in Rajasthan. In 1999, the Fairy Queen received a National Tourism Award. The train only operates on the second and fourth Saturdays of each month during the period October to March.	
Golden Chariot		2008	KSTDC & IRCTC	It connects major tourist areas in states of Karnataka, Kerala, Goa, Tamil Nadu and Puducherry weekly. It is named after the stone chariot at Hampi's Vitthala temple. The train's 19 purple-and-gold coaches bear the logo of a mythological animal with the head of an elephant and the body of a lion. Like the Deccan Odyssey, its amenities are based on the Palace on Wheels. The Golden Chariot is operated by the Karnataka State Tourism Development Corporation and marketed by Luxury Trains, with hospitality by the Mapple Group. The train has 44 cabins in 11 coaches named after dynasties which ruled the region: Kadamba, Hoysala, Rashtrakuta, Ganga, Chalukya, Bahamani, Adil Shahi, Sangama, Satavahana, Yadukula and Vijayanagar. It has two restaurants, a lounge, conference, gym and spa facilities and satellite television, and is India's only train with onboard Wi-Fi connectivity.	
Mahaparinirvan Express		2007	IRCTC	It is a Buddhist Pilgrim Train that offers an eight-day tour. It takes pilgrims to the places where Buddha was born (Lumbini), gained enlightenment (Bodhgaya), first started teaching (Sarnath), and finally attained the state of Nirvana (Kushinagar). The tour covers the states of Bihar and Uttar Pradesh in India, where Buddhism originated over 2500 years ago.	
Maharajas' Express		2010	IRCTC	The train was a joint venture between the Cox and Kings travel company and the IRCTC. It offers five itineraries, which are available from October to April. All of the trips either begin or end in Delhi and include a visit to Agra's Taj Mahal. It arrives at a different station each morning for off-rail excursions, including shopping and visits to monuments, heritage sites, palaces, forts and hotels. New itineraries include three pan-Indian journeys and two golden-triangle tours of Delhi, Jaipur and Agra. The Maharajas' Express is India's most expensive train.	
Palace on Wheels		1982; 2009 (refurbished)	RTDC & IR	The luxury train was introduced by Indian Railways to promote tourism in the state of Rajasthan. The palace-on-wheels concept derives from the royal background of the coaches, which were intended to be the personal railway coaches of the former rulers of the princely states of Rajputana, Gujarat, the Nizam of Hyderabad and the Viceroy of British India. It is a weeklong journey which begins and ends in New Delhi. It operates between September and April every year. The journey tracks a figure eight route through nine cities, which include cities like Jodhpur, Udaipur, and Agra. Each coach has four cabins (known as chambers or saloons) with twin beds, wall-to-wall carpeting, air-conditioning, satellite television, an intercom, toilets, hot and cold running water and personal attendants. The train was refurbished and reintroduced in August 2009 with new decor, itinerary and cuisine to promote tourism.	
Royal Orient		1994–95		The train operates between Gujarat and Rajasthan, covering important tourist locations in the two states. It is modelled on the Palace on Wheels train. The train was introduced in 1994-95 as a joint venture between the Tourism Corporation of Gujarat and Indian Railways. The journey covers cities such as Delhi, Chittorgarh, Udaipur, Junagarh, Veraval, Somnath, Sasan Gir National Park, Ahmedpur, Mandvi, Palitana, Sarkhej, Ahmedabad, and Jaipur.	
Royal Rajasthan on Wheels		2009	IR & IRCTC	It is operated by Indian Railways and is modelled on the Palace on Wheels. It follows a similar route through Rajasthan. The train visits several major tourist, wildlife and heritage sites across the state of Rajasthan, Attractions visited are the Hawa Mahal, Moti Mahal, Sheesh Mahal, Ranthambhore National Park, Chittorgarh Fort, Lake Palace, Keoladeo National Park, Agra Fort and the Taj Mahal.	
