= Luxury train =

Special train, designed for elegance and comfort

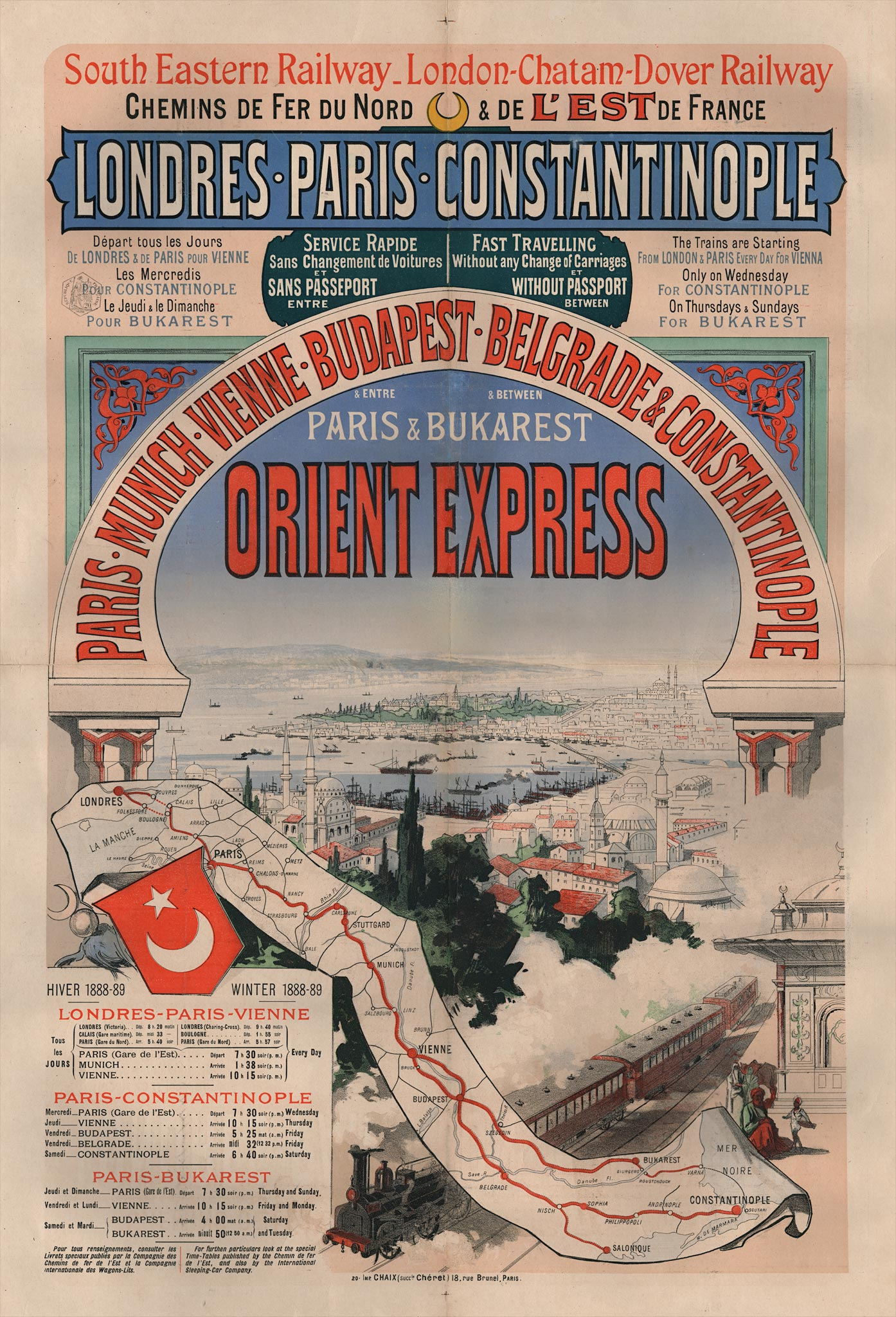
1888 poster for the Orient Express

A luxury train is a premium passenger rail service. Some luxury trains promote tourism in destinations across a region, while others (such as the Maharajas' Express and the Palace on Wheels) take passengers on a ride through a single country. Luxury trains include restaurants, bars, bathrooms, and sleeping and seating areas.

== History ==
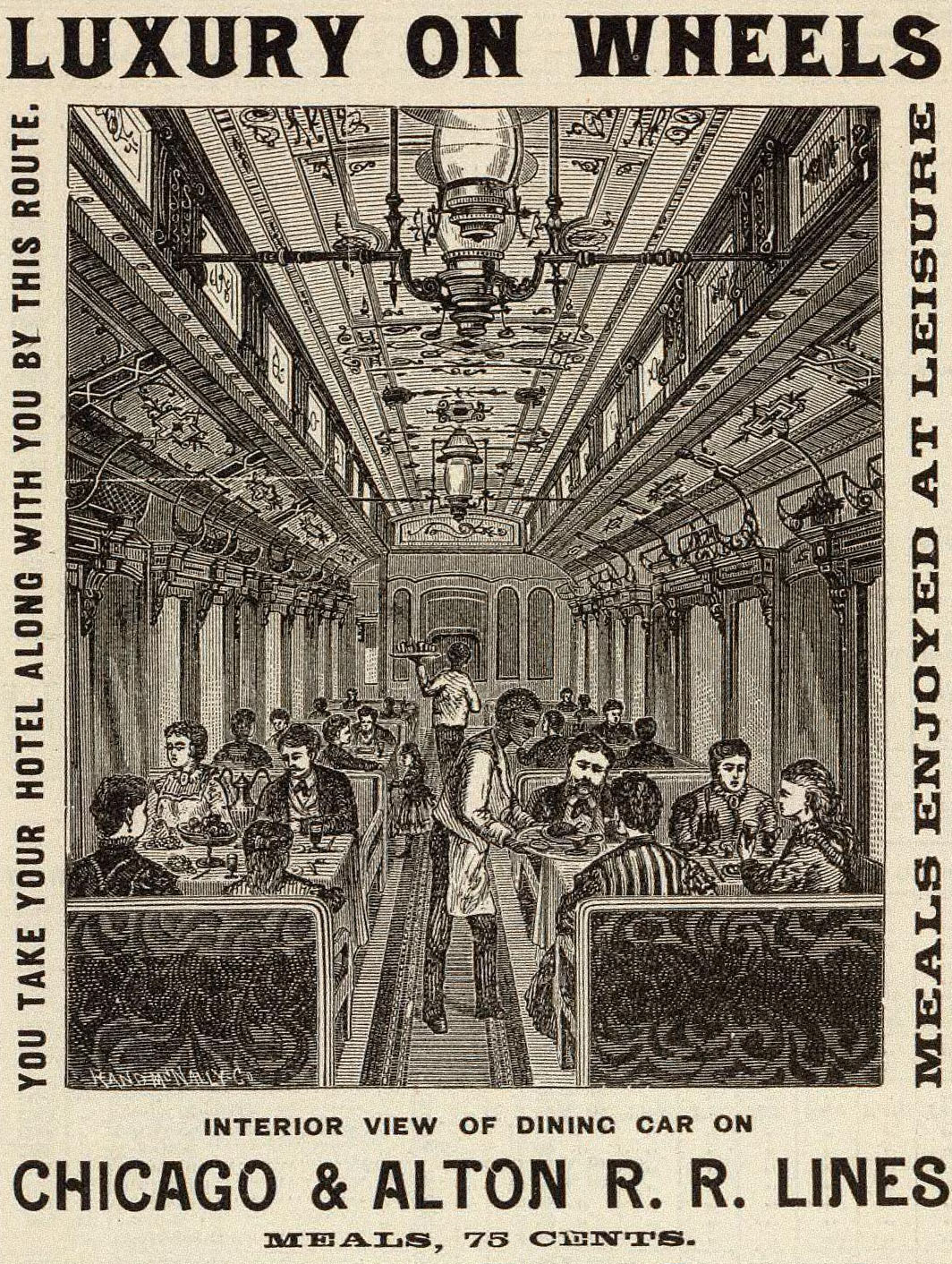
An illustration from the 1885 Chicago & Alton Railroad timetable

George Pullman's first sleeping car, the Pioneer, was introduced in 1865 in the United States and was followed two years later by "hotel cars". It was the first railway carriage with dining and sleeping areas.

Georges Nagelmackers founded the French Compagnie Internationale des Wagons-Lits, creator of the Orient Express. Inspired by Pullman trains in the US, Nagelmackers returned to Europe and built a fleet of over 30 luxury trains that traveled to several European destinations. He is credited with beginning the age of luxury trains and grand hotels. The Orient Express, setting of Agatha Christie's Murder on the Orient Express, was Europe's first luxury train. It began its maiden journey on 5 June 1883 from Paris' Gare de l'Est. Although the original Orient Express ceased operation in 2009, private operators and public–private joint ventures provide luxury train travel in several countries.

== Belmond trains ==
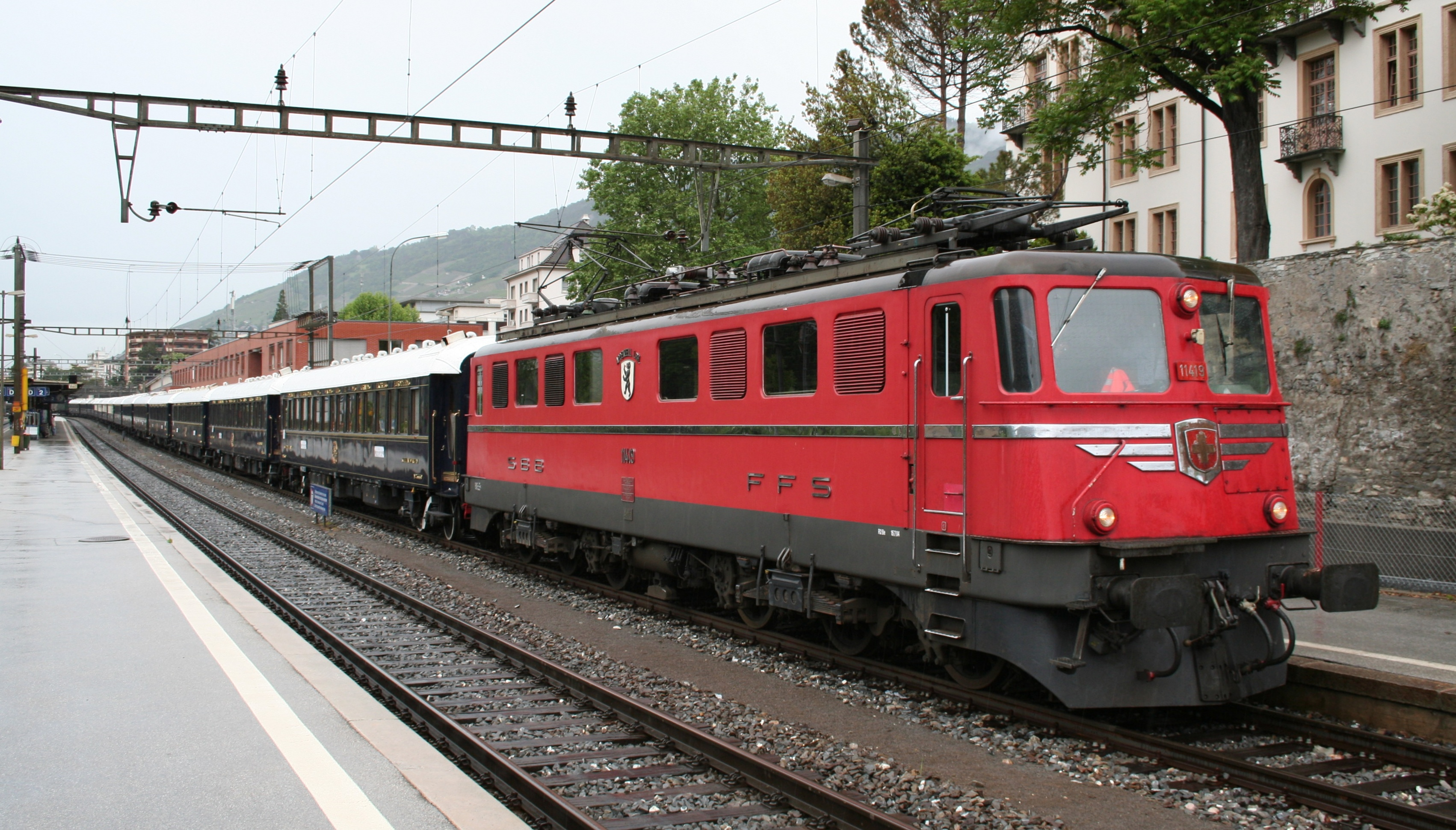
Ae 6/6-hauled Venice-Simplon Orient Express in Switzerland

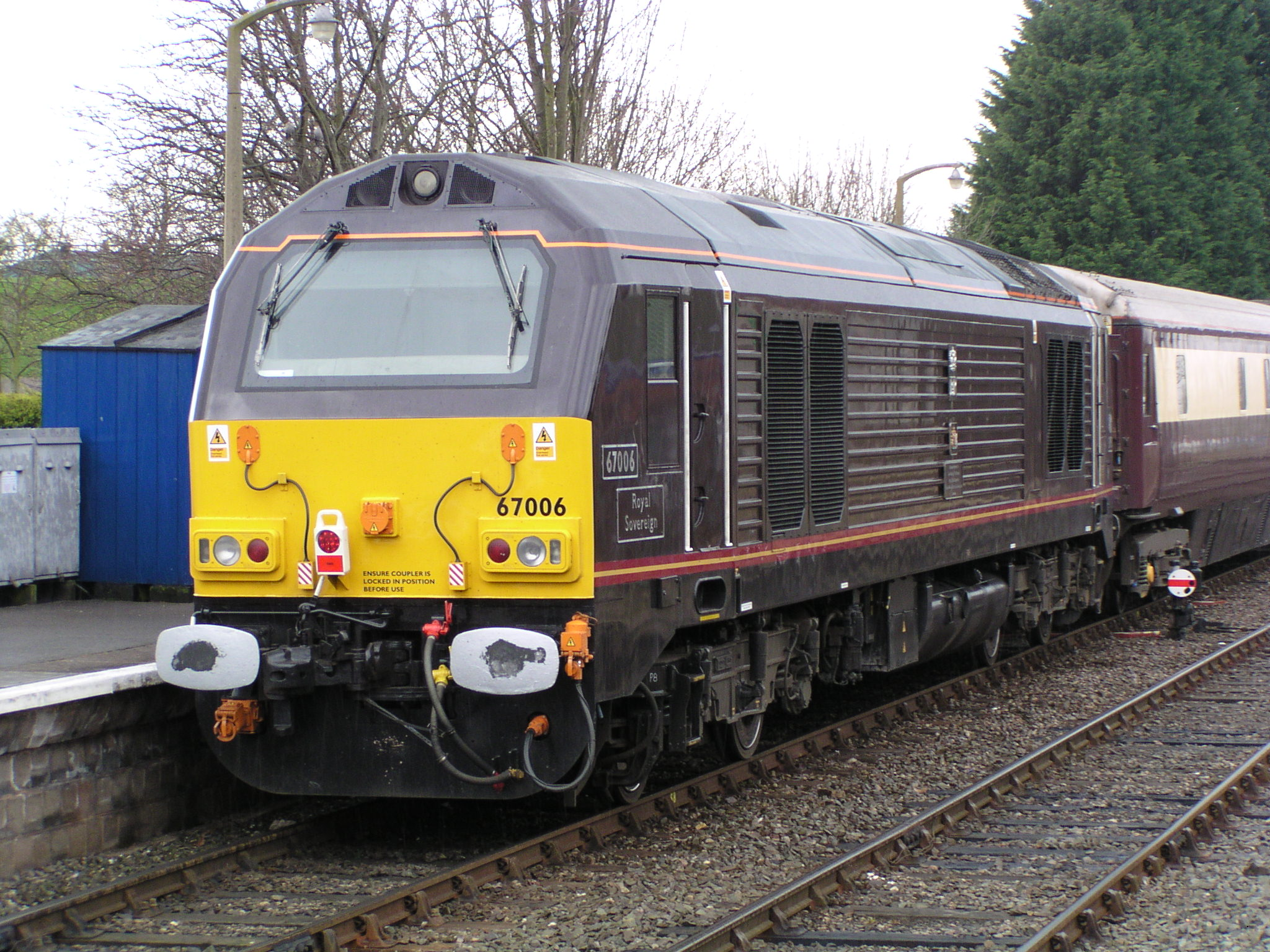
Class 67, no. 67,006 Royal Sovereign hauling the Northern Belle

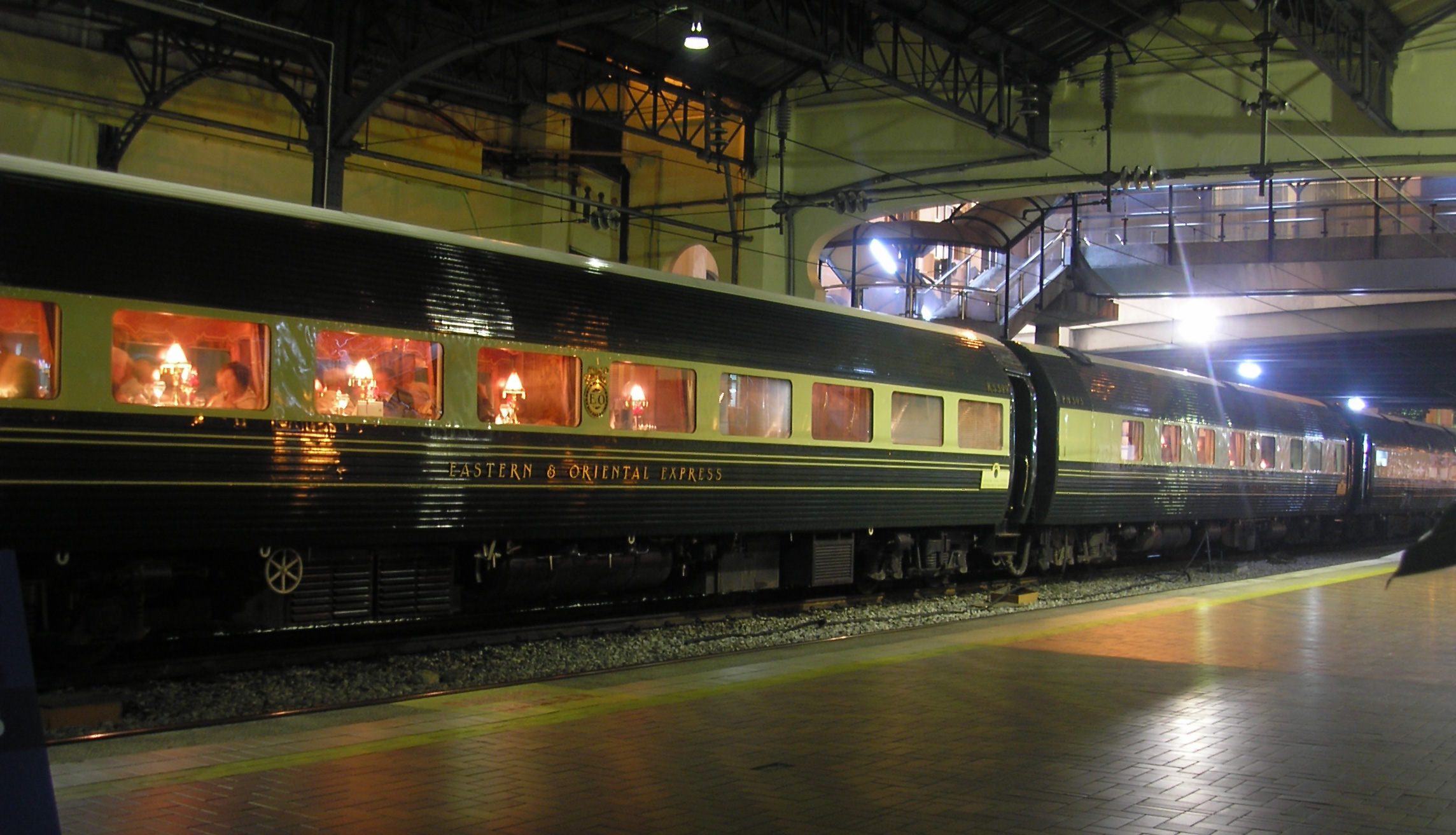
Bangkok-bound Eastern & Oriental Express train at the Kuala Lumpur railway station in Malaysia

According to Belmond (formerly known as Orient Express Hotels), the company operates the highest number of luxury train tours in the world. With service in Europe, Asia, and South America, Belmond is the only private luxury tour provider (with the exception of Russia's Golden Eagle Trans Siberian Express) to offer continental or intercontinental service.

The Venice-Simplon Orient Express, with service from London to Venice, was voted the top luxury train in the world in 2009. The Royal Scotsman offers service across Scotland and, occasionally, the rest of Britain. The Belmond Grand Hibernian began operations in Ireland on 30 August 2016. The Belmond British Pullman operates day and weekend journeys around Britain, primarily from London Victoria station.

The Eastern & Oriental Express runs from Bangkok to Singapore (via Kuala Lumpur) and to Vientiane. Covering over 2,000 kilometres (1,200 mi) of peninsular Southeast Asia, its two-day journey includes frequent stops at scenic locations.

The Belmond Andean Explorer services the Peruvian cities of Arequipa to Cusco and vice versa, and the Belmond Hiram Bingham, named after the explorer who rediscovered the Incan citadel of Machu Picchu, runs from the Sacred Valley to the landmark.

== Europe ==
Cross-border luxury trains in Europe include the Venice Simplon-Orient-Express, which runs between London and Venice.

=== United Kingdom ===
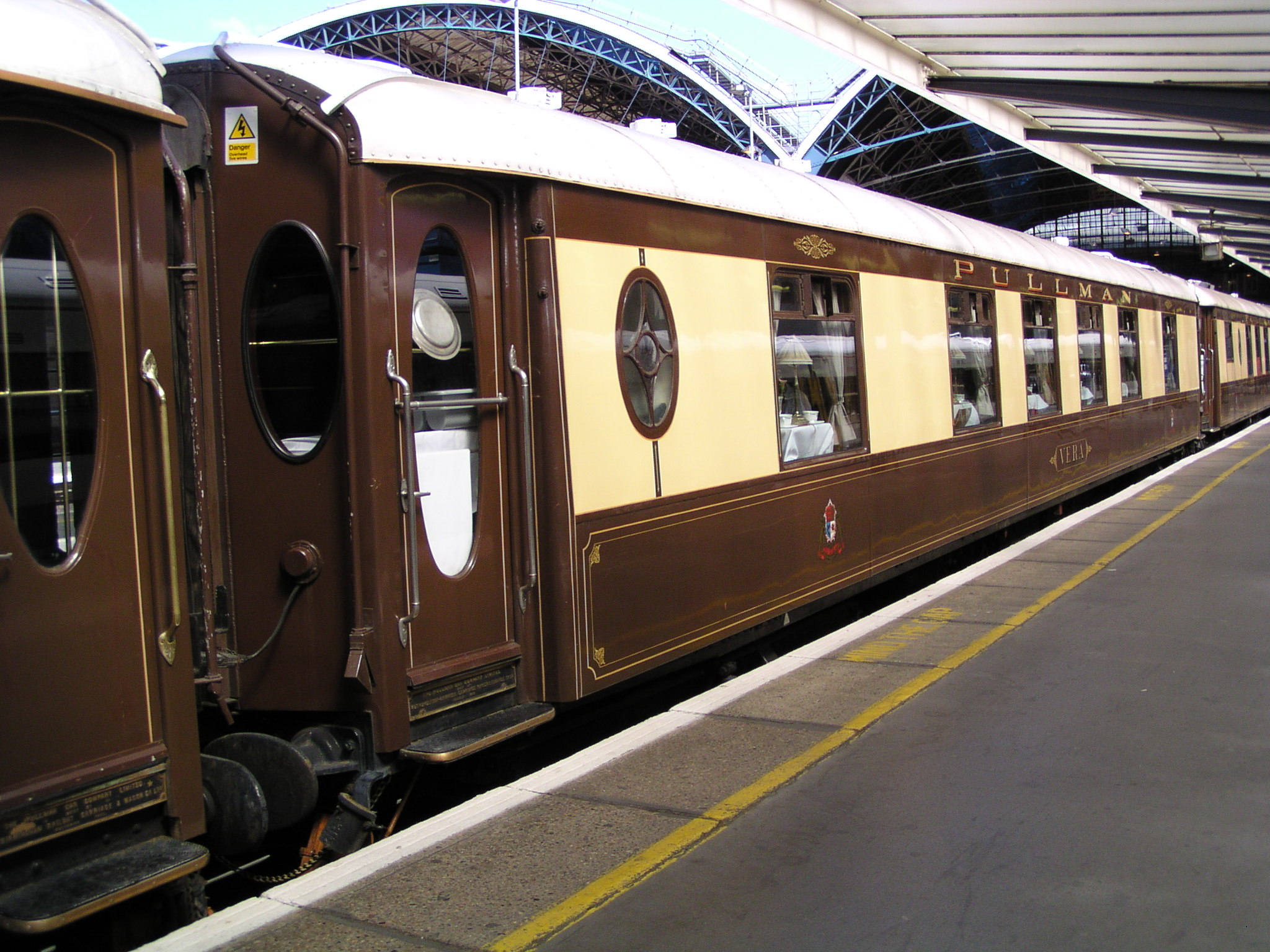
Former Brighton Belle Pullman carriage at London Victoria, now part of the Venice-Simplon Orient Express fleet

British Pullman cars were formerly used on the Brighton Belle out of London Victoria station.

==== Northern Belle ====
Northern Belle is a privately owned luxury train introduced in 2000. It consists primarily of British Rail Mark 2 coach stock, refurbished internally and painted externally to resemble the Brighton Belle's British Pullman coaches. Buffet cars are British Rail Mark 1 coaches. Although the train primarily operates in Northern England and Scotland, it also serves London and Bristol. The train has two British Rail Mark 3 sleeper coaches for its crew. It departs from a number of northern cities, including Liverpool, Edinburgh, Glasgow, and Manchester. The Northern Belle has six dining cars, named after historic British houses.

=== Spain ===
Spain's luxury tourist trains are operated through Renfe's tourist train programme, which includes El Transcantábrico Gran Lujo, Tren Al Ándalus, Costa Verde Express, and El Expreso de La Robla.

==== El Transcantábrico ====
El Transcantábrico is a Spanish luxury tourist train associated with the metre-gauge railways of northern Spain. According to Renfe, the service began operating in León in 1983, was renovated in 2000, and was completely overhauled in 2011 as El Transcantábrico Gran Lujo. Its route is centred on northern Spain, particularly the Atlantic and Cantabrian regions.

==== Al Ándalus ====
Tren Al Ándalus is Renfe's principal luxury tourist train in southern Spain, which conducts seven-day journeys across Andalusia.

=== Sweden ===
Between 1950 and 1969, Swedish State Railways operated the luxury train service Sunlit Nights Land Cruises, which ran from Stockholm to northern Sweden and primarily targeted foreign tourists.

=== Switzerland ===
The GoldenPass Express is a luxury train linking Montreux on Lake Geneva with Interlaken in the Bernese Oberland. The Glacier Express is a luxury train linking Zermatt in the Valais Alps with St. Moritz in the Grisons Alps.

=== Russia ===
The Golden Eagle Trans-Siberian Express began operation in April 2007 and takes passengers on a 6,000-mile (9,656 km) trip (the world's longest train journey) across two continents and eight time zones. It follows the Trans-Siberian Railway, which connects Moscow and European Russia with the Russian Far East, Mongolia, China, and the Sea of Japan.

== North America ==
=== Rocky Mountaineer ===
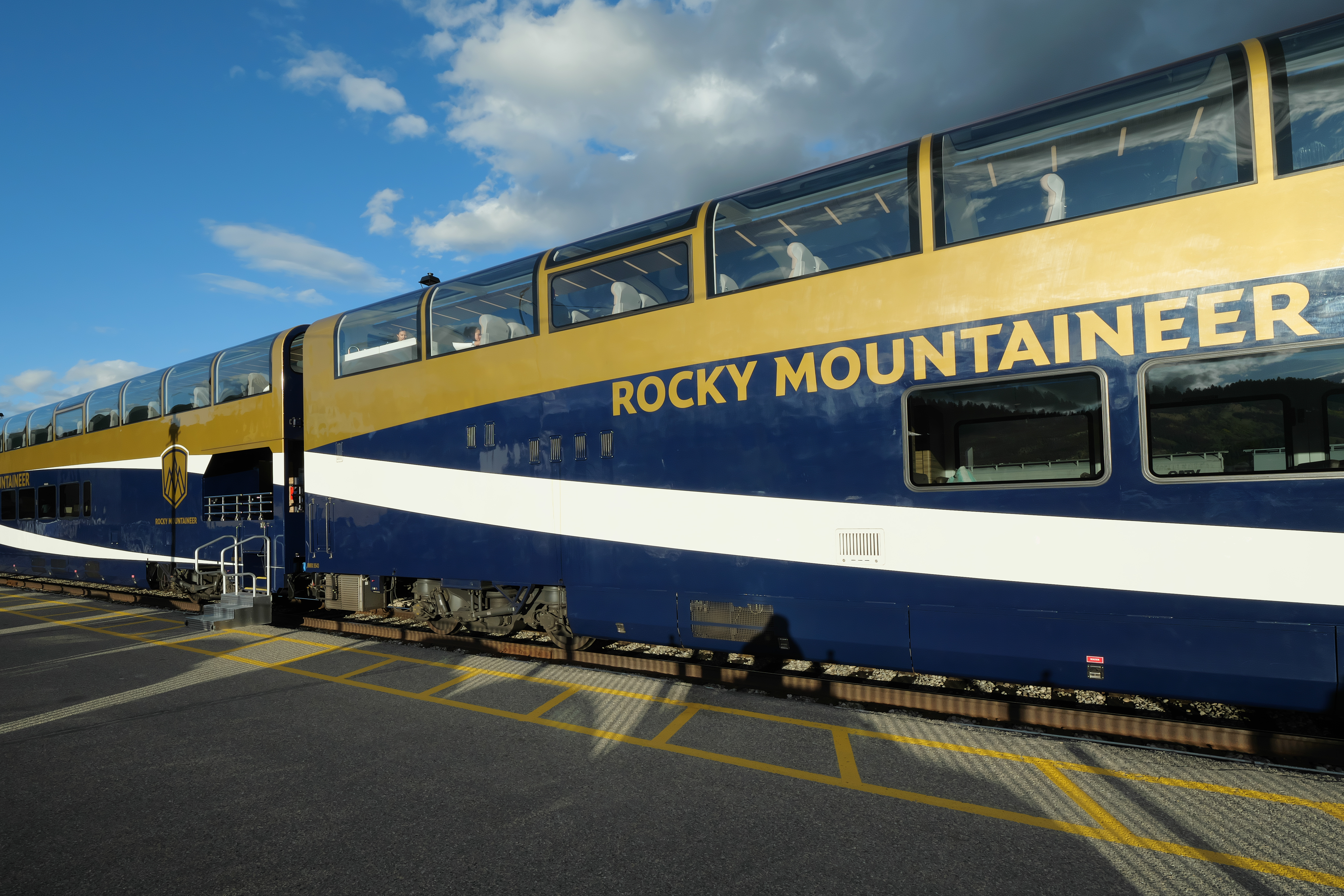
Rocky Mountaineer's distinctive domed carriages allow for expansive views of the Canadian Rockies.

Rocky Mountaineer is a Canadian company that operates trains touring the Canadian Rockies and the northwestern U.S. Via Rail sold off its Rockies by Daylight scenic train to Rocky Mountaineer Vacations (which became Rocky Mountaineer) in 1990. The company operates four routes.

=== Royal Canadian Pacific ===
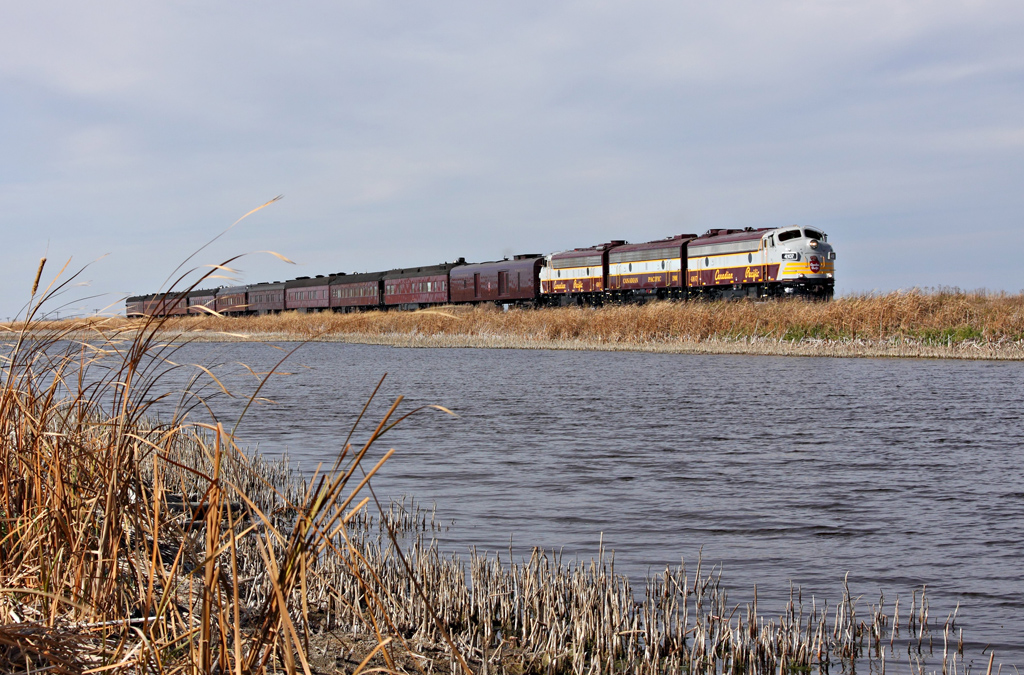
The Royal Canadian Pacific on an international run in North Dakota in 2012

The Royal Canadian Pacific is a luxury overnight passenger train based in Calgary, Canada. The train has a royal warrant from Queen Elizabeth. It makes charter runs along CP tracks in summer and fall, taking passengers into the Rocky Mountains of Alberta and British Columbia. A typical six-day, five-night round trip runs through the Columbia River valley and Crowsnest Pass. The train halts at night to enable passengers to enjoy the scenery. It consists of up to ten luxury passenger cars (built between 1916 and 1931), two fully restored 1950s locomotives, and a booster unit.

== Asia ==
=== Japan ===
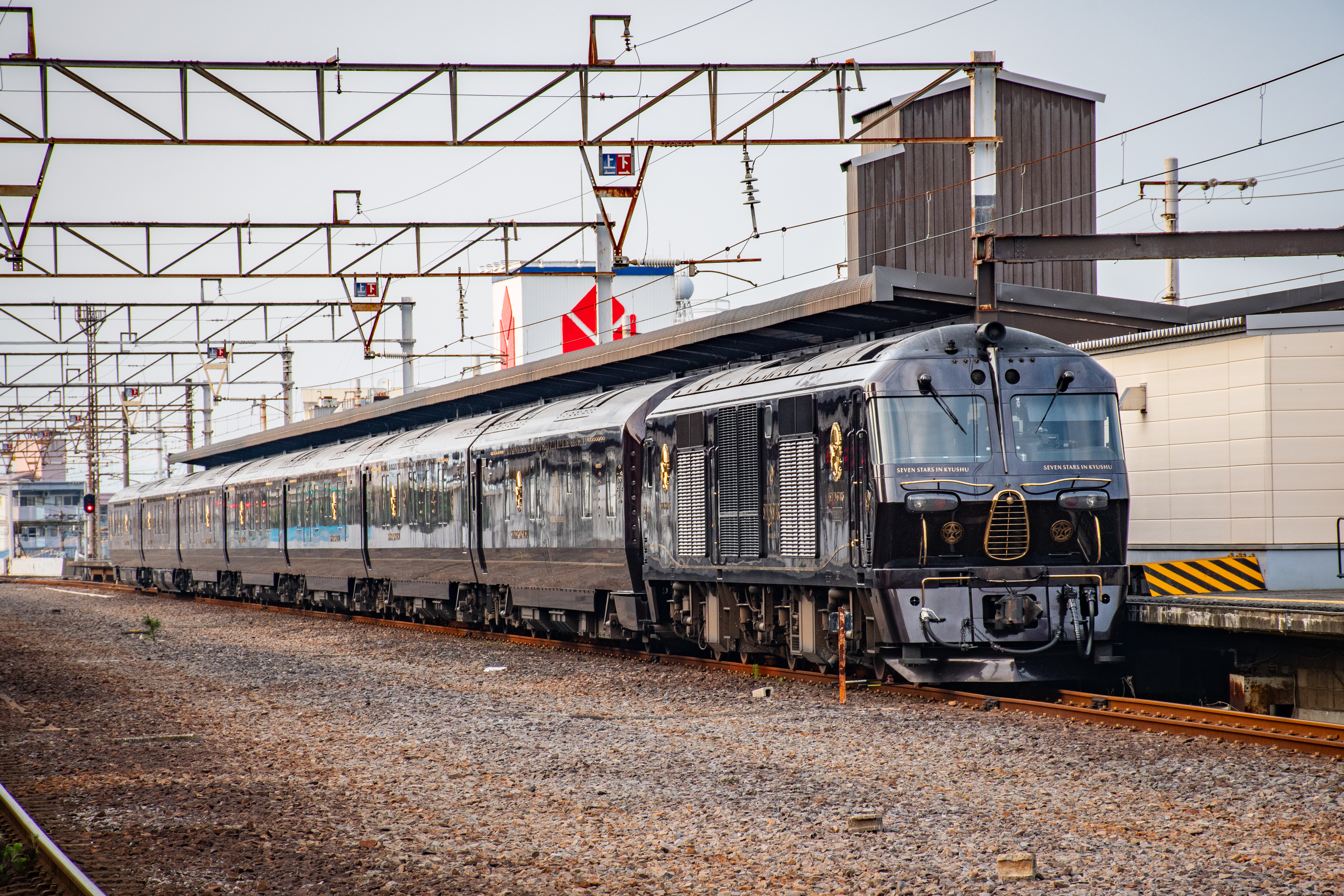
The Seven Stars in Kyushu is a deluxe sleeping car excursion train operated by the Kyushu Railway Company in Japan

Seven Stars in Kyushu is a deluxe sleeping-car excursion train that has toured the island of Kyushu since October 2013. Its name derives from Kyushu's seven prefectures and the train's seven cars. The train has a piano, bar, suites, a mini-kitchen, a crew room, shower rooms, and toilets. It offers two- and four-day round trips, departing from Hakata Station. The two-day tour visits Nagasaki, Aso, and Yufuin, and the four-day journey visits Yufuin, Miyazaki, Miyakonojō, Hayato, Kagoshima-Chuo, Kagoshima, Aso, and Bungo-Mori.

In 2017, East Japan Railway Company (JR East) launched the Train Suite Shikishima, while West Japan Railway Company (JR West) began operating the Twilight Express Mizukaze. The most luxurious courses of each train are priced at ¥950,000 for a four-day, three-night journey on the Shiki-shima and ¥1,250,000 for a three-day, two-night trip on the Mizukaze. The two trains differ in their interior design philosophy: Shikishima emphasizes innovation and modernity, whereas Mizukaze has been described as an extension of a traditional luxury hotel.

=== India ===
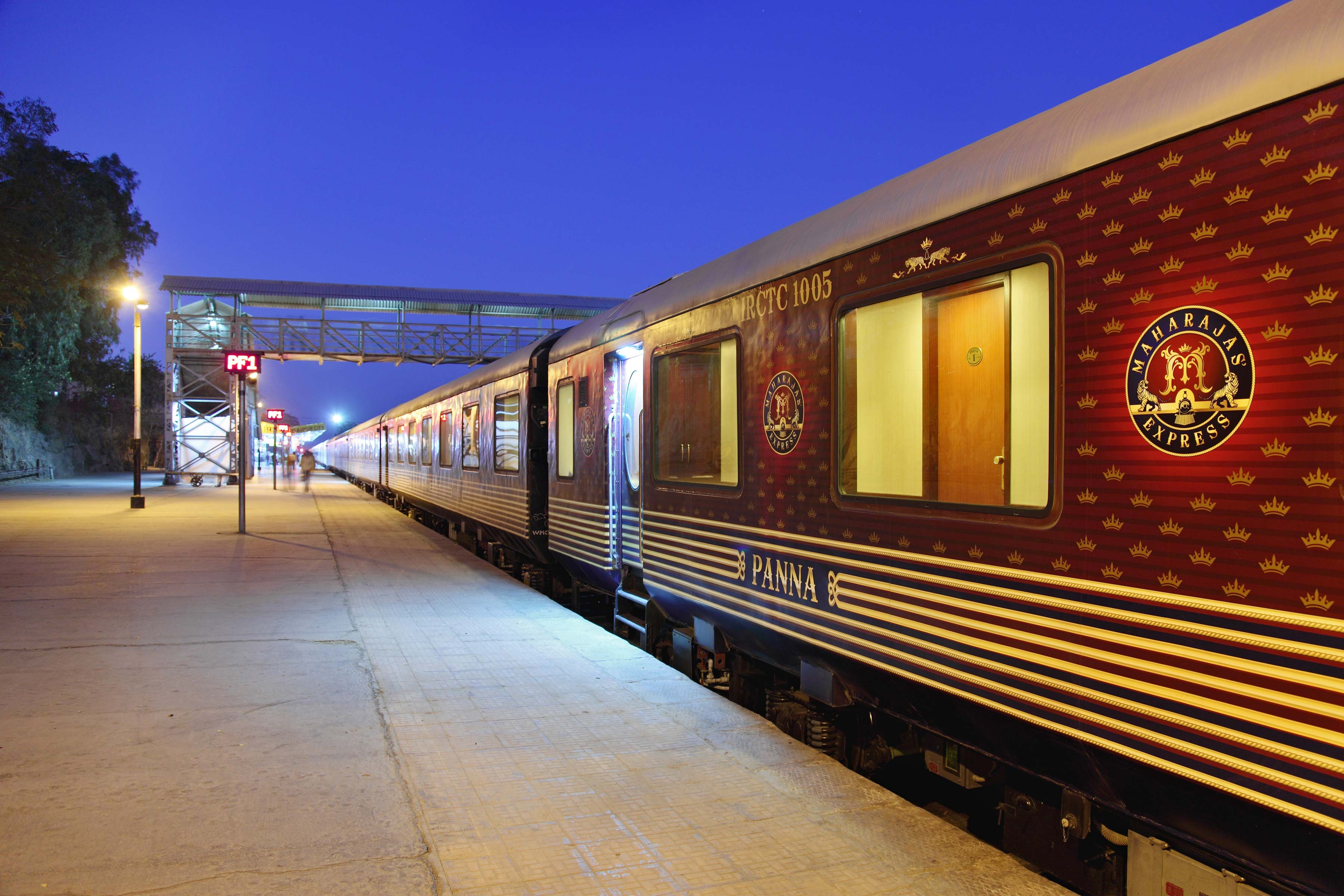
The Maharajas' Express is a luxury tourist train operated by the IRCTC.

Luxury trains in India include the Palace on Wheels, Deccan Odyssey, Golden Chariot, Maharajas' Express, and Royal Rajasthan on Wheels.

== South Africa ==
The Blue Train, covering about 1,600 kilometres (990 mi) between Pretoria and Cape Town, is South Africa's oldest and best-known luxury train service. Transnet Freight Rail runs the Blue Train, also between Pretoria and Cape Town. Rovos Rail operates the Pride of Africa service, which runs between South Africa, Zimbabwe, Zambia, and Tanzania.

== Australia ==
The Ghan, a luxury train, runs 2,979 kilometres (1,851 miles) through the heart of the Australian continent, from Darwin in the north to Adelaide in the south. The Indian Pacific is a long-distance train connecting Sydney on the east coast, with Perth on the west coast.

== Gallery ==
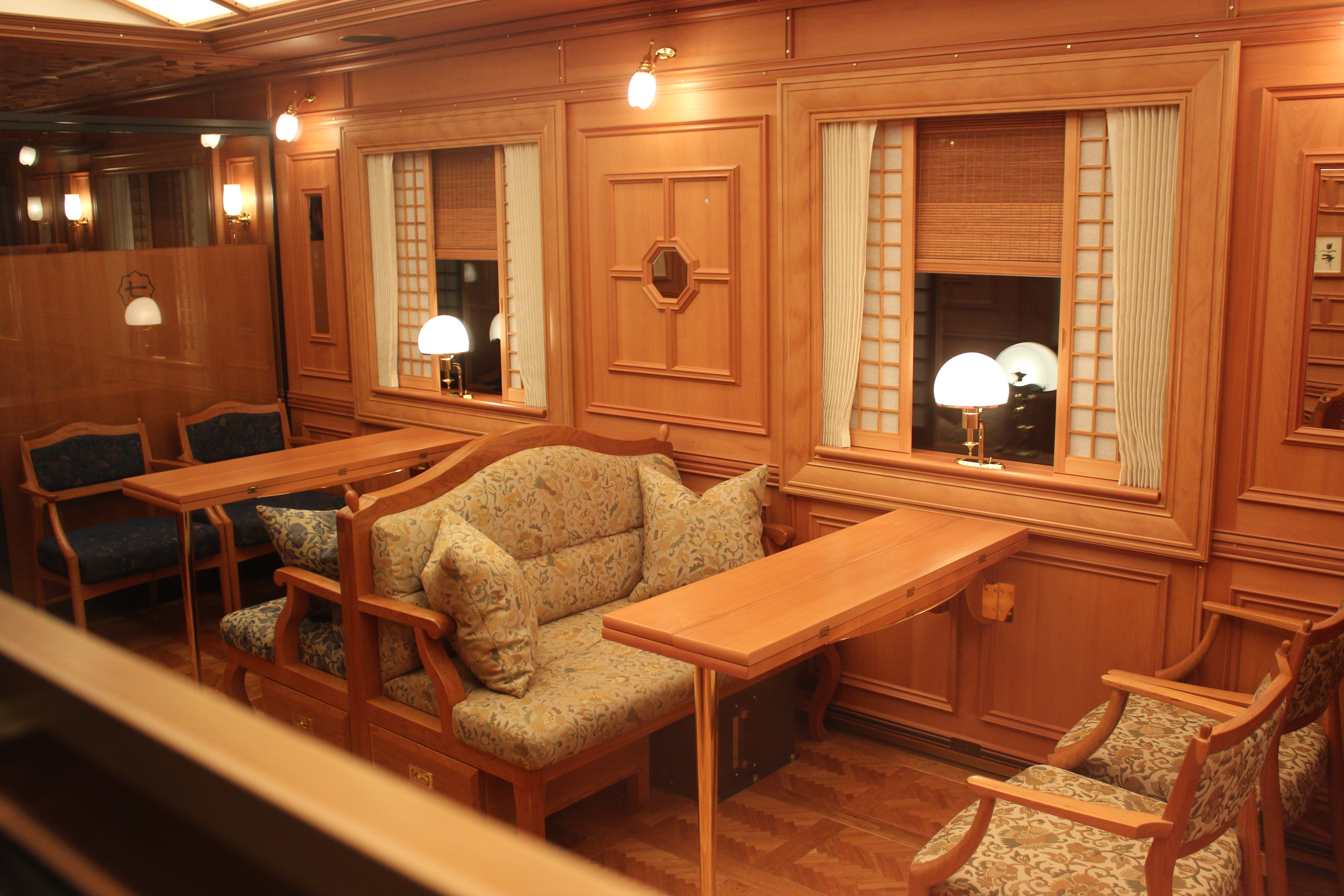
Dining car on Seven Stars in Kyushu

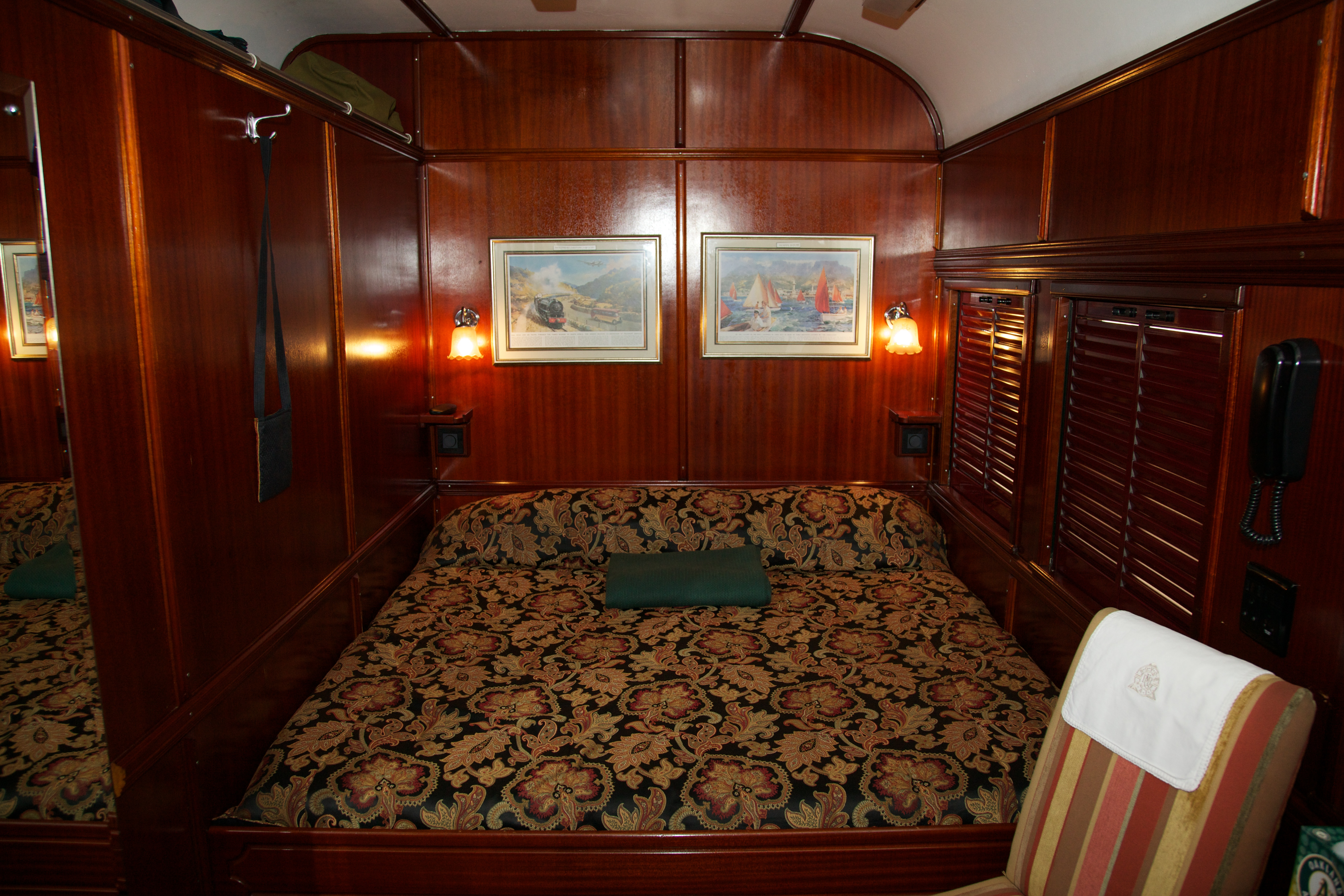
Pride of Africa deluxe suite

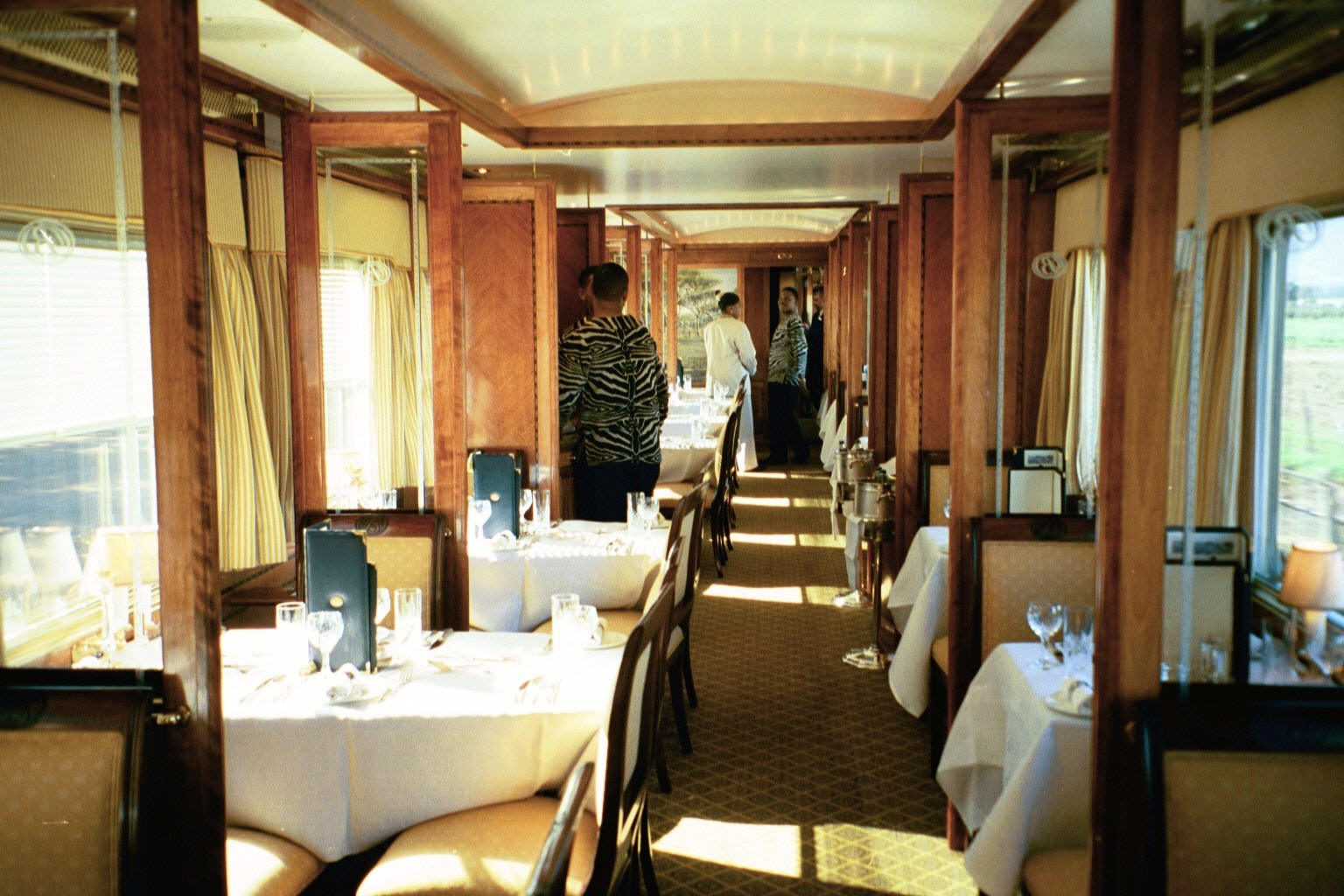
Dining car on the Blue Train

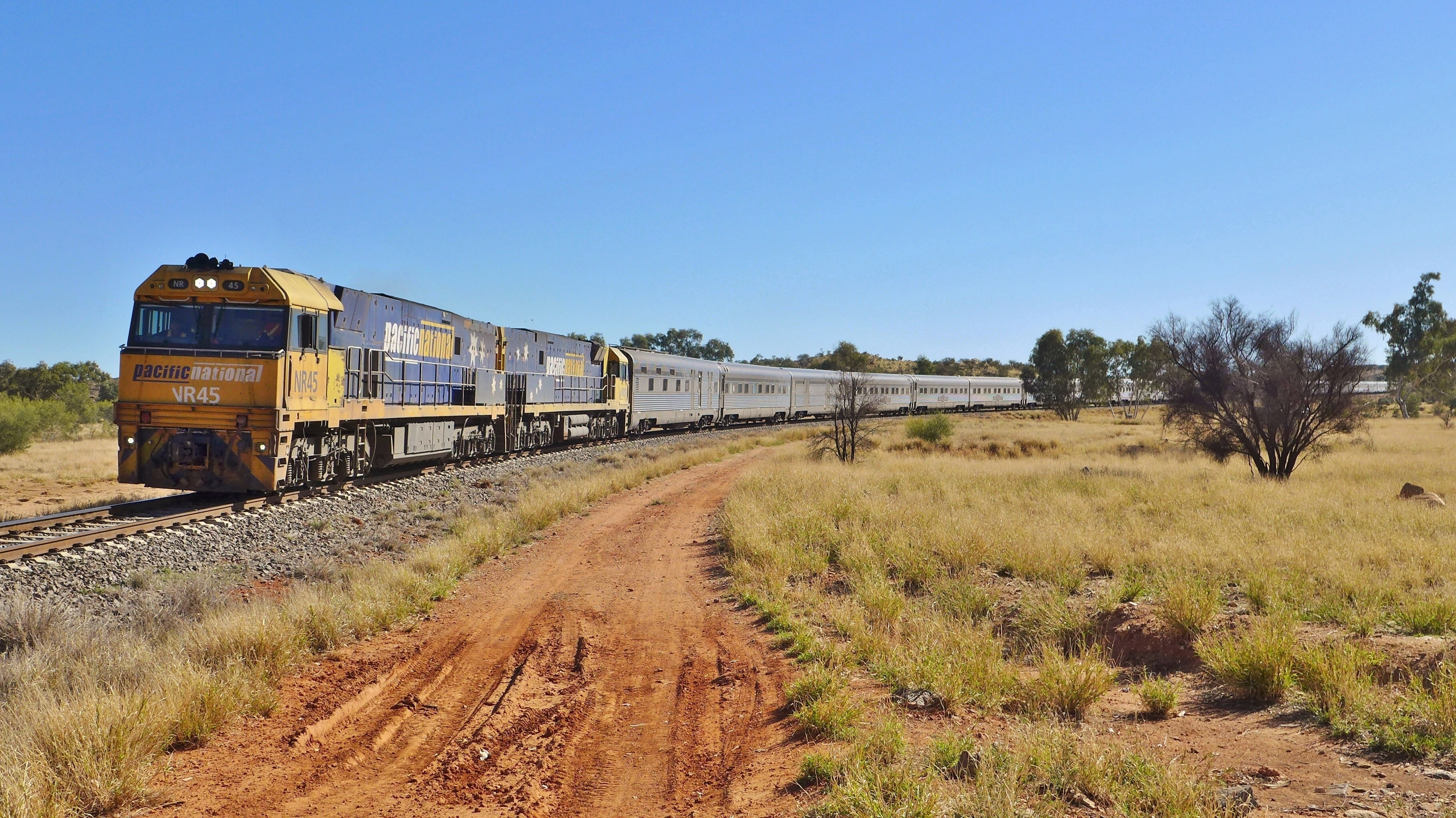
The Ghan approaching Alice Springs, 2015

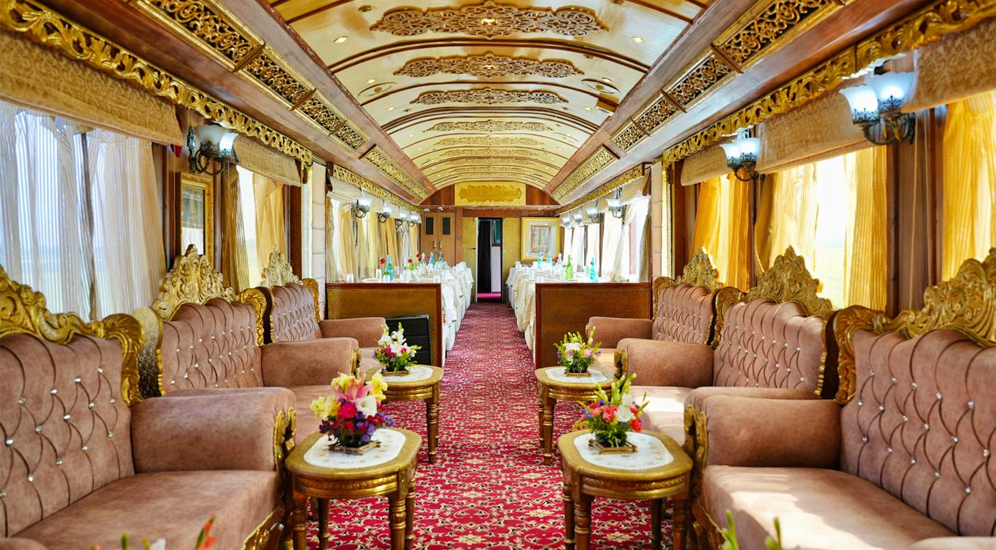
The Palace on Wheels luxury restaurant Swarn Mahal

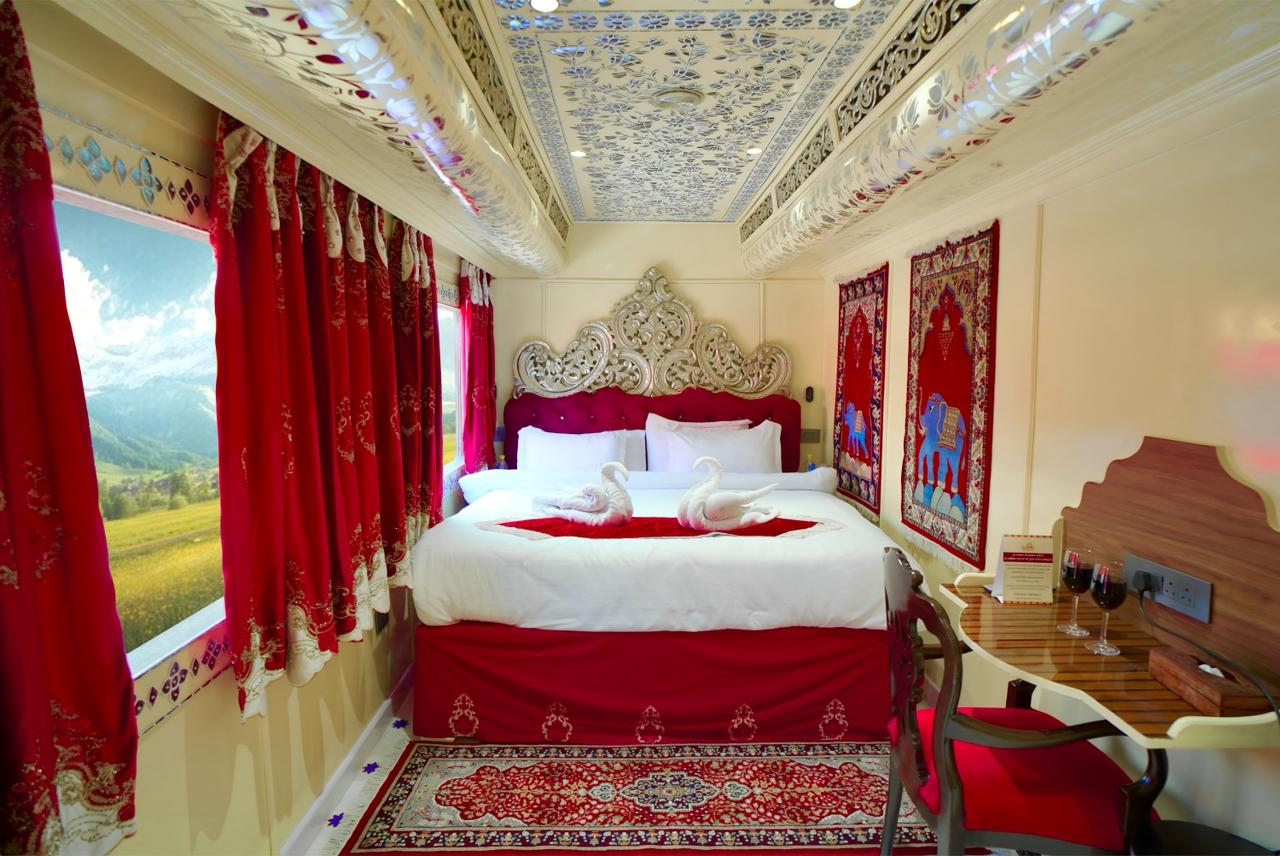
The Palace on Wheels presidential suite

== See also ==
- Heritage railway
