= Mahaparinirvan Express =

Indian tourist train

Mahaparinirvan Express transl. The Nirvana Express
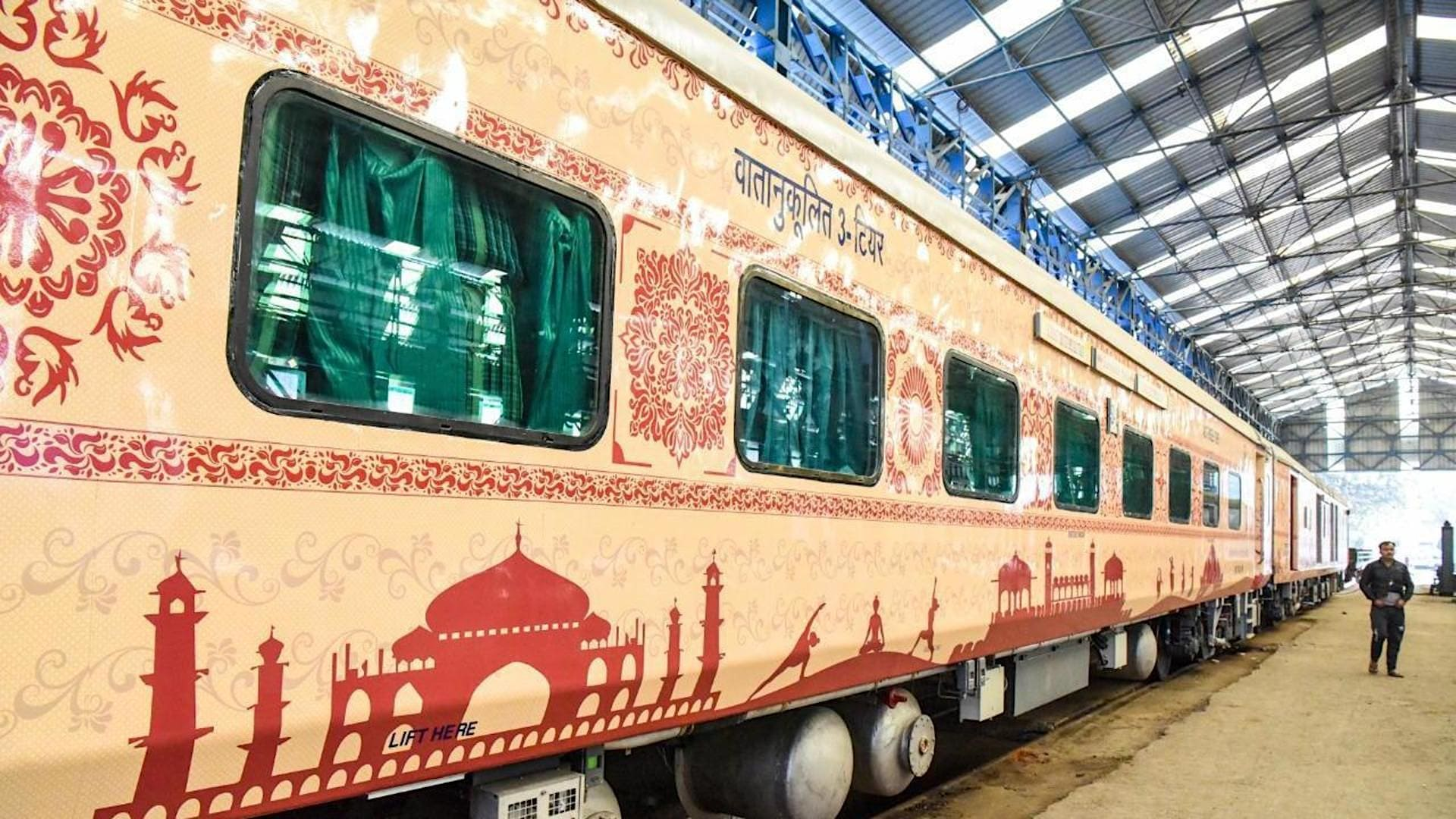
- Manufacturer: Indian Railways
- Built at: Integral Coach Factory, Chennai
- Family name: Luxury Trains
- Constructed: 2007
- Entered service: 2007
- Operators: Indian Railways and Indian Railways Catering and Tourism Corporation Limited (IRCTCL)
- Line served: Howrah–Gaya–Delhi line

The Mahaparinirvan Express (transl. The Nirvana Express) is a tourist train which was launched by the Indian Railways Catering and Tourism Corporation Limited (IRCTCL) on 28-March-2007, to attract Buddhist pilgrims. The train takes passengers on an eight-day, seven-night spiritual tour which visits Buddhist sites across North India and Nepal.

== History ==
The train gets its name from the Mahaparinirvana of the Buddha. The journey covers sacred destinations which includes Buddha's visit to various important Buddhist pilgrimage sites, such as Lumbini (where he was born), Bodhgaya (where he gained enlightenment), Sarnath (where he first taught) and Kushinagar (where he attained the state of Nirvana).

== Features and services ==
The Mahaparinirvan Express is operated by Indian Railways and Indian Railways Catering and Tourism Corporation Limited using carriages from a Rajdhani Express train. The fully air conditioned train offers three different classes of travel (first class, two tier, and three tier).

The train offers an eight-day package.

== Traction and coach rakes ==
Since first run was used decorated ICF Rajdhani coaches now they gets LHB coaches and hauled by diesel traction like Itarsi-based WDM-3A

== See also ==
- Fairy Queen (locomotive)
- Palace on Wheels
- Royal Orient
- Deccan Odyssey
- Golden Chariot
- Royal Rajasthan on Wheels
- Maharajas' Express

== Sources ==
1. http://www.indianrail.gov.in/luxury_Train.html
2. Verma, Kumod (13 March 2007). "Buddhist-circuit train to be flagged off on Mar 28". The Times of India.
