= Maharajas' Express =

Luxury tourist train in India

Maharajas' Express transl. The Emperors' Express
- Logo of the Maharajas' Express
- Family name: Luxury Trains
- Entered service: 2010; 16 years ago
- Operator: Indian Railways Catering and Tourism Corporation Limited (IRCTCL)

The Maharajas' Express (transl. The Emperors' Express) is a luxury tourist train owned and operated by The Indian Railways Catering and Tourism Corporation Limited (IRCTCL). It serves four routes across North-West and Central India, mainly centred on Rajasthan between the months of October and April.

The Maharajas' Express, often also referred to as the Orient Express of the Orient, was voted "The World's Leading Luxury Train" Seven times in a row at The World Travel Awards from 2012 through 2018 and again in 2024 for the eighth time. Maharajas' Express also received recognition from the Condé Nast Traveler Readers' Choice Travel Award in 2022.

== History ==
The train service was started in March-2010. The IRCTCL and Cox and Kings India Ltd entered a joint venture, setting up Royale Indian Rail Tours Ltd (RIRTL) to oversee the functioning and management of the Maharajas' Express. This arrangement was terminated on 12-August-2011, and the train was then operated exclusively by IRCTCL.

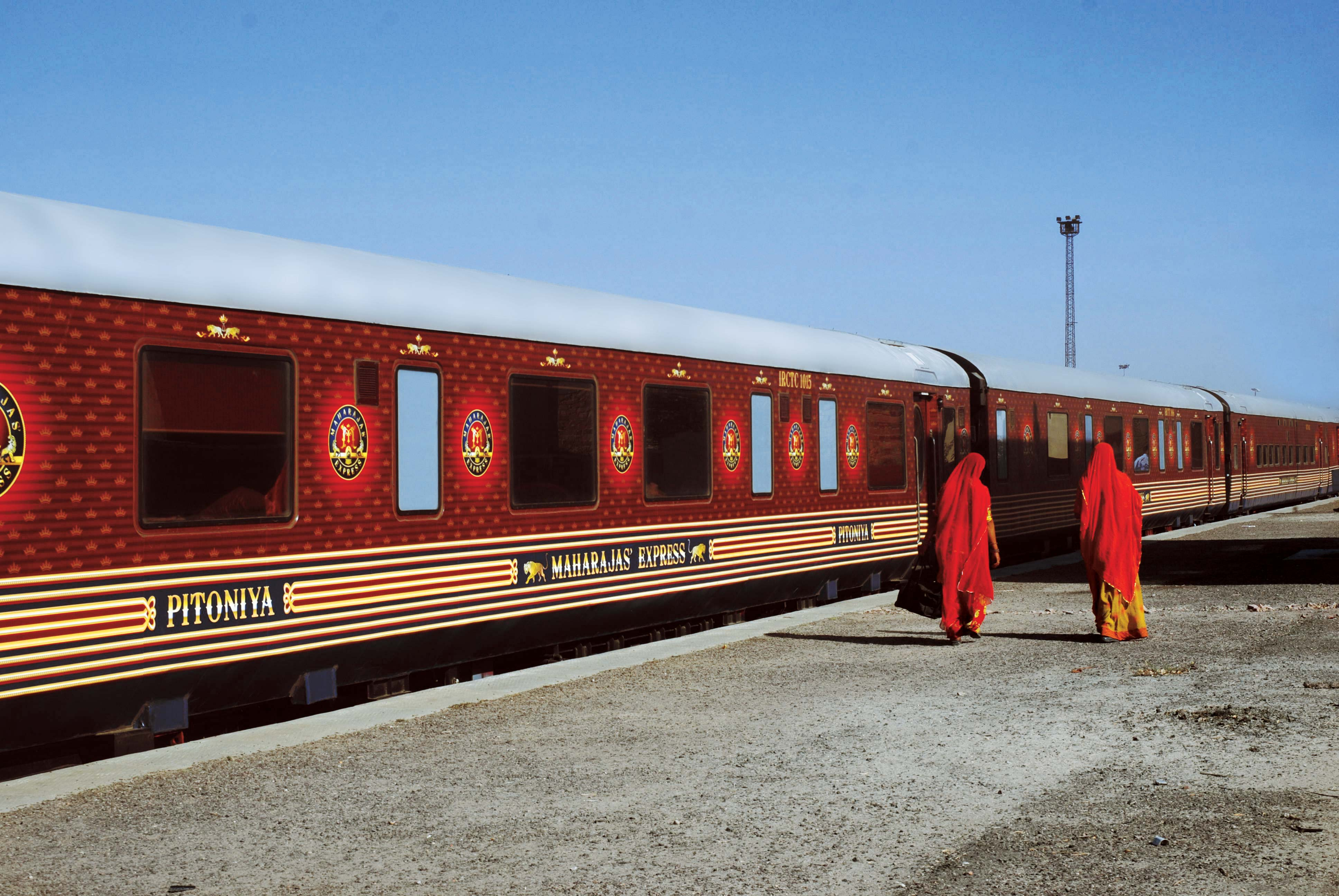
Maharajas' Express halted at a railway station in Rajasthan and two ladies wearing traditional rajasthani dress, passing by.

== Carriages ==
The train comprises 23 carriages which include accommodation, dining, bar, lounge, generator, and store cars. Accommodation is available in 14 guest carriages with a total passenger capacity of 84. The train also has a lounge called the Rajah Club with a private bar, two dining cars, and a dedicated bar car. The train is also equipped with a water filtration plant.

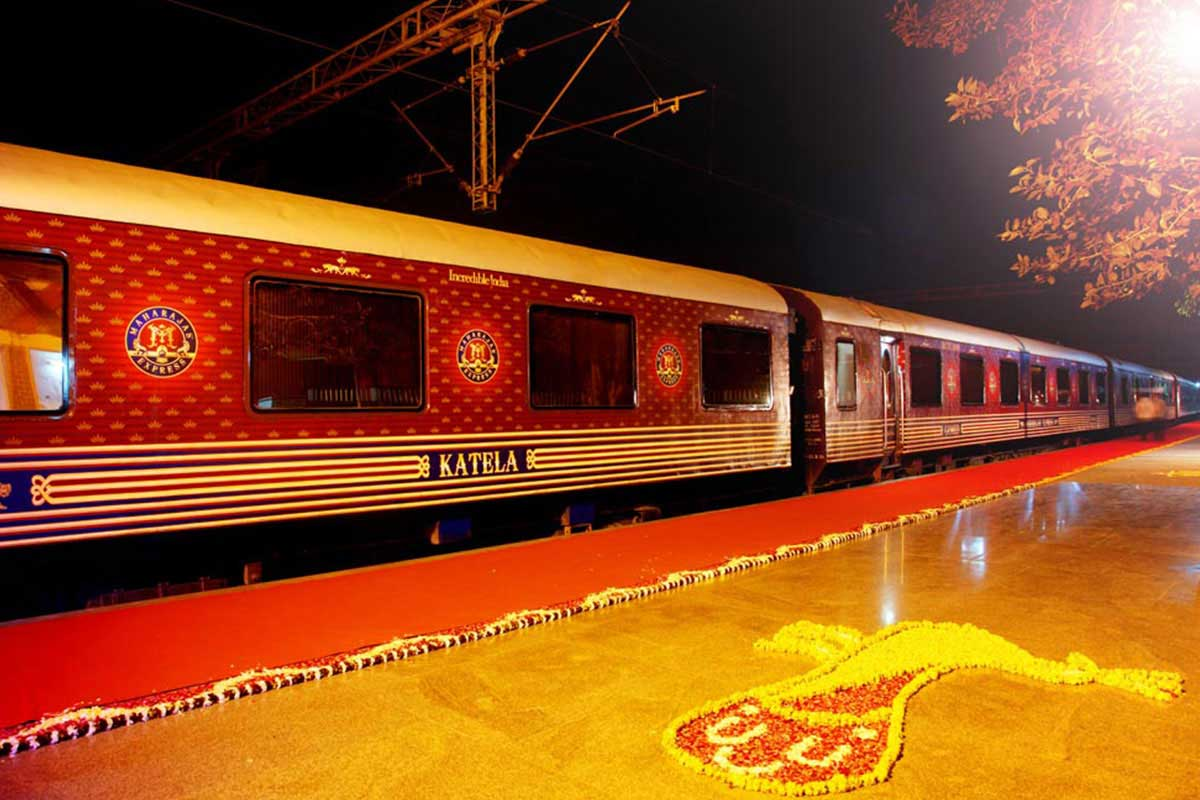
Maharaja's Express arriving at the railway station

=== Guest Cabins ===
The guest carriages provide seating and sleeping capacity for 84 guests. There are 20 Deluxe Cabins, 18 Junior Suites, 4 Suites, and a Presidential Suite. All suites have a full bath. The Presidential suite occupies an entire rail carriage, incorporating a separate sitting-cum-dining room, a master bedroom and bathroom with shower and bathtub, plus a twin bedroom and bathroom with shower,

=== Dining and Bar Coaches ===
The train has two dining cars — named Rang Mahal (transl. Palace of Colours) and Mayur Mahal (transl. Palace of Peacocks) — designed for full fine dining service. Mayur Mahal (the Peacock restaurant) has a peacock feather theme in its décor. The Rajah Club is a dedicated bar carriage. The Safari lounge and bar have a multilingual library.

== Traction ==
it was hauled by both diesel and electrified locomotives. Diesel like Prateek WDP-4D and electrified like Vadodara-based Amul Branded WAP-5

== Routes ==
Maharajas Express operates four different itineraries from October to April, of which two are short-term Golden Triangle (Delhi, Jaipur, and Agra) tours and the other three are week-long pan-India voyages:

Name	Duration	Route
Heritage of India	6 Nights/7 Days	Mumbai – Ajanta – Udaipur – Jodhpur – Bikaner – Jaipur – Ranthambore – Agra - New Delhi
Treasures of India	3 nights/4 days	Delhi – Agra – Ranthambore – Jaipur – Delhi
Indian Panorama	6 Nights/7 Days	Delhi – Jaipur – Jodhpur - Ranthambore – Fatehpur Sikri – Agra – Gwalior – Orchha – Khajuraho – Varanasi – Lucknow – Delhi
The Indian Splendour	6 Nights/7 Days	Delhi – Agra – Ranthambore – Jaipur – Bikaner – Jodhpur – Udaipur – Balasinor – Mumbai

The train's curated journey includes participation in evening prayer rituals at the banks of river Ganga.

== In Popular Media ==
- ITV correspondent Sir Trevor McDonald travels India by the Maharajas' Express in a 2019 documentary.
- Featured in Episode 3 of Season 2 of the Discovery Channel Canada series Mighty Trains.
- Featured in Episode 2 of Amazon's James May: Our Man in India (2024)

== Gallery ==
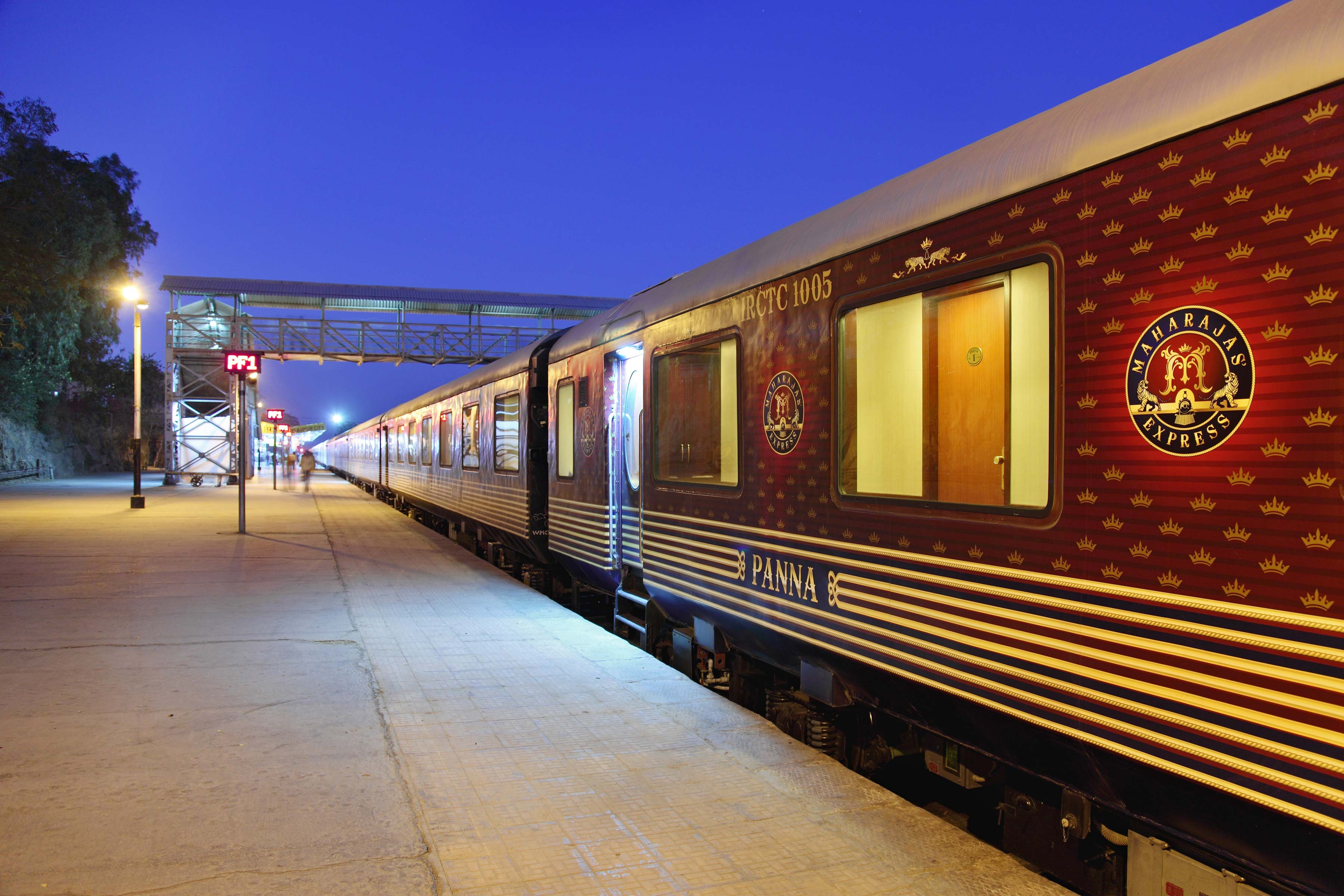
A view of Maharajas' Express

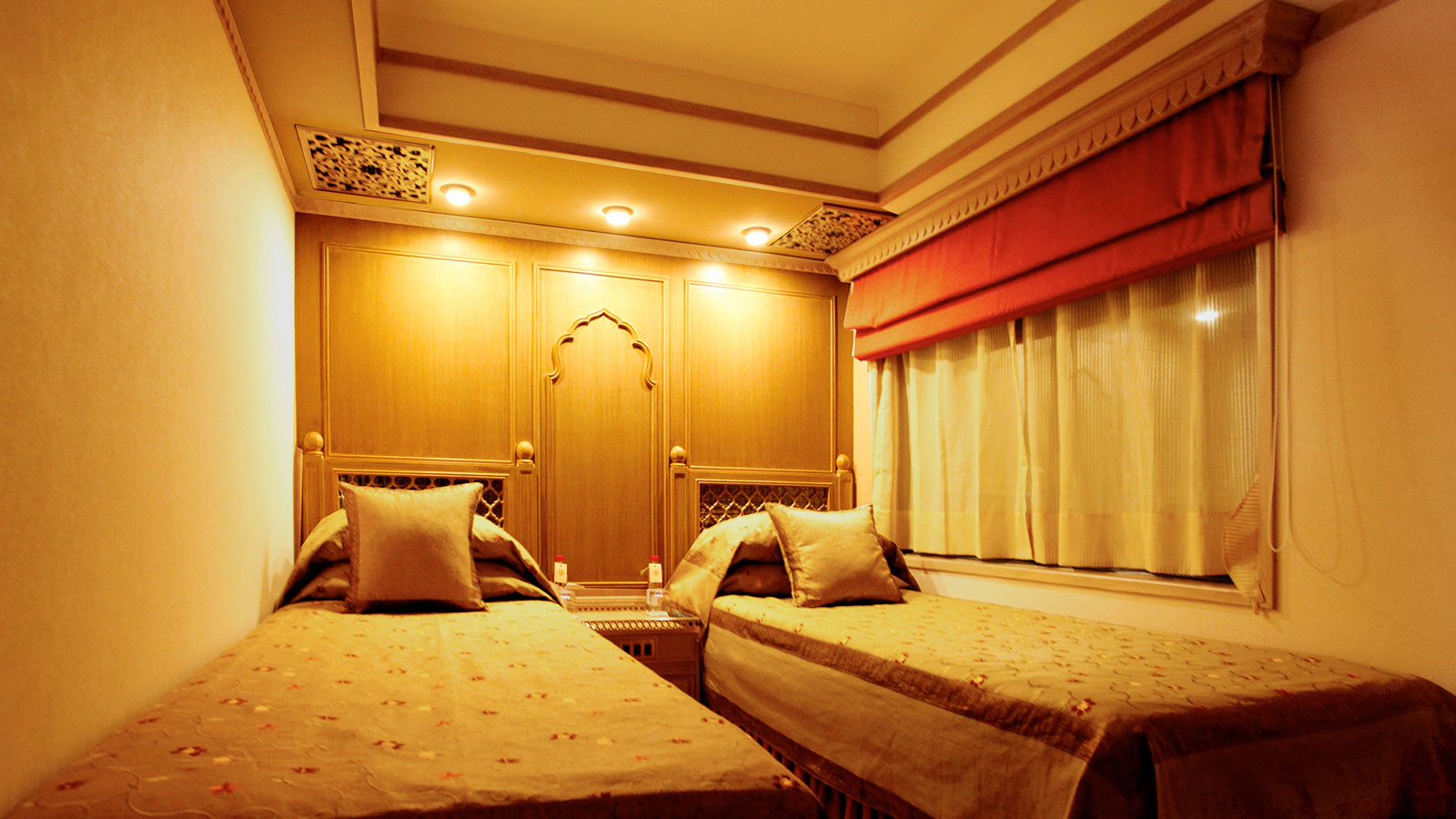
Luxury Beds in the Maharajas' Express

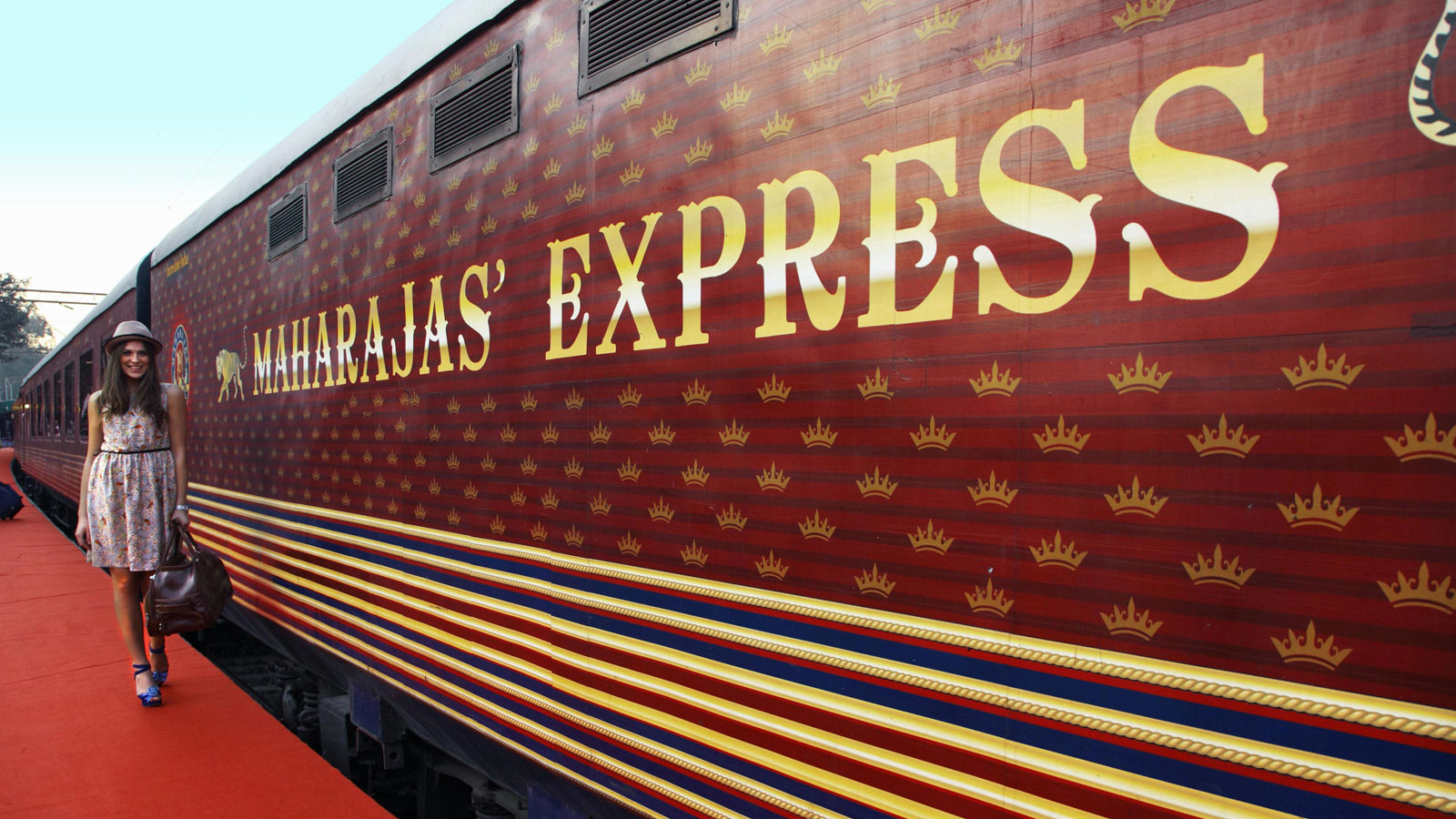
Foreign tourists at The Maharajas' Express

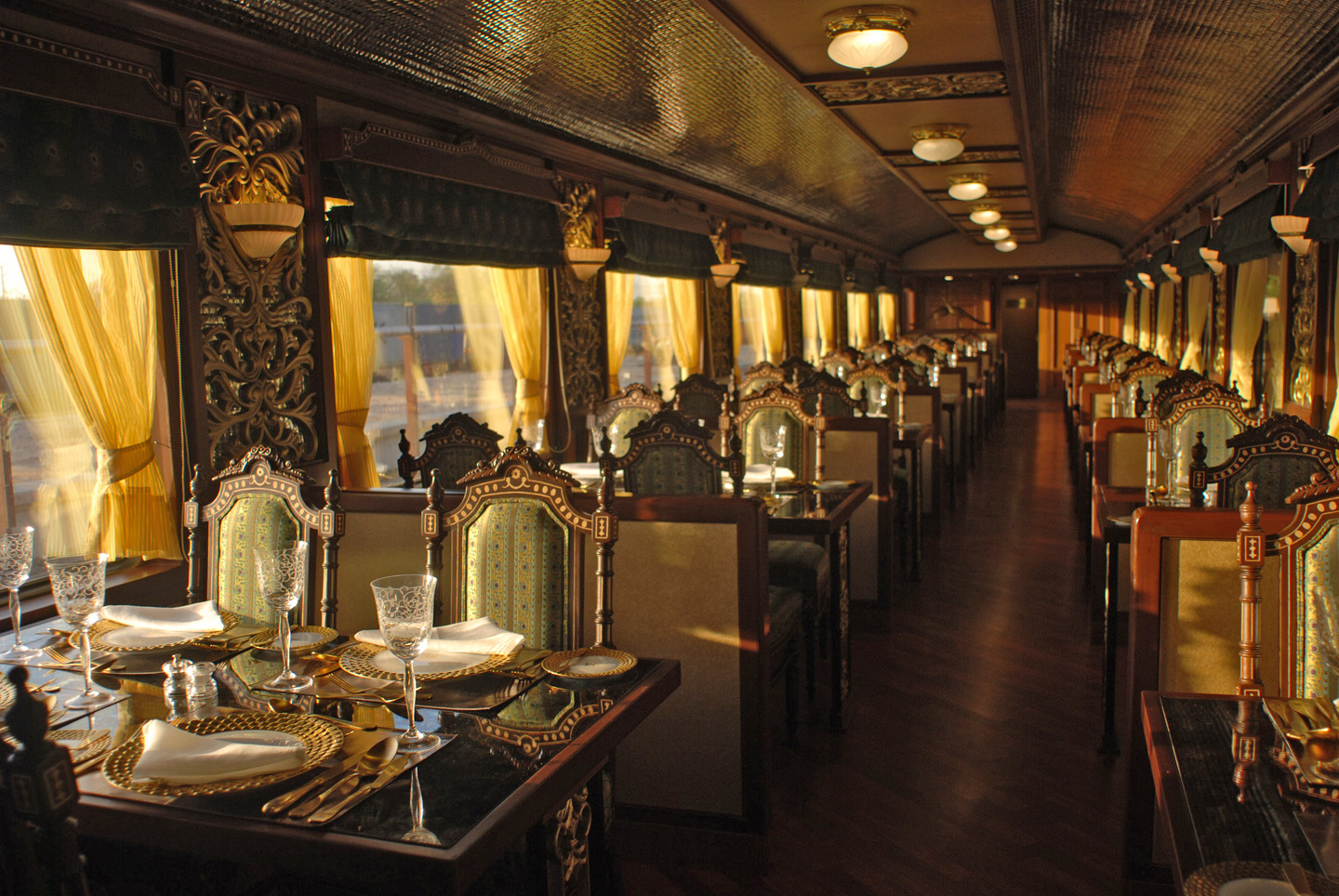
Dining at Maharajas' Express

== See also ==
- Fairy Queen
- Palace on Wheels
- Royal Orient
- Deccan Odyssey
- Mahaparinirvan Express
- Golden Chariot
- Royal Rajasthan on Wheels
