= Rajasthan Tourism Development Corporation =

Indian state government agency

Rajasthan Tourism Development Corporation (RTDC) is an agency of the Government of Rajasthan set up on 1 April 1979 to develop tourism in the Indian state. It manages many restaurants, cafeterias, hotels and bars. The Corporation also organizes package tours, fairs, festivals, entertainment, shopping and transport services. In collaboration with Indian Railways it runs the luxury tourist train Palace on Wheels. RTDC has hotels/motels at all major tourist places in Rajasthan.

== Hotels ==
- hotal chambal, Kota
- hotal swagatham, Jaipur
- hotel meenal, alwar
- hotel khadim, ajmir
- hotel shikhar, mount abu
- hotel kajri, udaipur
- hotel panihari, pali
- hotel ghoomar, jodhpur
- hotel gangaur, jaipur
- hotel teej, jaipur
- hotel Castle Jhoomar Baori, Sawai Madhopur
- hotel Bharatpur Forest Lodge, Bharatpur
