= Royal Orient =

Indian luxury train

The Royal Orient
- Entered service: 1994-95
- Operator: Indian Railways

The Royal Orient is an Indian luxury tourist train that runs between Gujarat and Rajasthan, covering important tourist locations in both states.

Modelled on the Palace on Wheels, India's first luxury tourist train, it offers tourists a taste of royal luxury while "showcasing the best of Indian culture and heritage".

== History ==
The train started operating in 1994–95 as a joint venture between the Tourism Corporation of Gujarat and Indian Railways. Its livery features a blue scheme to differentiate it from the Palace on Wheels.

The train struggled in its early years, with passenger occupancy dropping from 25 percent in the first year to 15 percent in subsequent years. However, after an overhaul in 2007, things started looking up and the train started making profits.

== Facilities ==
There are 13 coaches in the train which are named after erstwhile kingdoms of Rajputana. Cabins are furnished in a palatial style and have baths attached. The train has multi-cuisine restaurants which offer Rajasthani, Gujarati, Indian, Chinese and Continental cuisine.

== Route ==
The Royal Orient starts from Delhi Cantonment railway station and operates between September and April, starting every Wednesday of the week. It provides an eight day and seven night tour, and has stops at Chittorgarh, Jaipur, Udaipur, Ahmedabad, Mehsana, Junagarh, Veraval, Sasan Gir, Mandvi, Dilwara, Palitana and Sarkhej.

Some of the tourist spots covered are the Qutub Minar, Red Fort and Jama Masjid in Delhi, Chittorgarh Fort and Rani Padmini's Palace in Chittorgarh, Sabarmati Ashram in Amdavad, Lake Palace in Udaipur, the Gir Wildlife Sanctuary and Somnath Temple in Gujarat and the Hawa Mahal and Jantar Mantar in Jaipur.

== See also ==
- Fairy Queen
- Palace on Wheels
- Deccan Odyssey
- Mahaparinirvan Express
- Golden Chariot
- Royal Rajasthan on Wheels
- Maharajas' Express
