= VOW =

VOW may mean:

- Vow
- Canadian Voice of Women for Peace, known as VOW, a Canadian anti-war organization
- VOW, The Voice of a Woman – organization showcasing women filmmakers, artists and thought leaders through festivals, awards and talks.
- VOW, the SAME code for a Volcano Warning
- Vow (Garbage song)
- Village on Wheels. Exclusive tourist trains in India (especially catering to the budget tourists, Ŗhence the name)
- Virtual Office Website
