= Golden Chariot =

Indian luxury tourist train

The Golden Chariot
- Logo of The Golden Chariot
- Manufacturer: Indian Railways
- Built at: Integral Coach Factory, Chennai
- Family name: Luxury Trains
- Constructed: 2008
- Entered service: 2008
- Operator: Karnataka State Tourism Development Corporation (KSTDC)
- Depots: Whitefield, Bangalore
- Line served: Bangalore-Mysore-Hassan-Hospet-Badami-Vasco-da-Gama(Goa)-Bangalore (South Western Railway)

The Golden Chariot is a luxury tourist train that connects the important tourist spots in the Indian states of Karnataka, Goa, Kerala & Tamil Nadu as well as Puducherry, depending on the selected itinerary. The train is operated by the Karnataka State Tourism Development Corporation and The Maple Group handles the hospitality services on the train.

It is named after the Stone Chariot in the Vitthala Temple at Hampi. The train has 19 coaches which are coloured purple and gold, and reflect the logo of a mythological animal with the head of an elephant and a body of a lion. The Golden Chariot had its maiden commercial run on 10-March-2008, and generally runs weekly during the months of October–March, departing on Sundays during the 2022-23 season. The train is designed on the lines of the more popular Indian luxury train Palace on Wheels.

All journeys offered by the train originate and end at Banglore.

== History ==
When the success of Palace on Wheels reached the corridors of the Karnataka State Tourism and Development Corporation (KSTDC), it resulted in the signing of MoU between the state tourism board and the Indian Railways in 2002. Later the Integral Coach Factory (ICF) was assigned the task to give shape to this luxury train. Approximately 900 design layouts were prepared by the engineers before finalizing the design.

Architect Kusum Pendse worked with a team of 200 carpenters to complete the designs of these railway coaches and the process took around 4 months to complete.

On 23-January-2008, The Golden Chariot was unveiled on the tracks veneered in classic colours of purple and gold symbolising elegance and golden jubilee celebration of Karnataka. An inauguration ceremony was organised at the Yeswanthpur Junction railway station wherein the President of India Pratibha Devisingh Patil flagged off the train.

On 10-March-2008, The Golden Chariot started its maiden journey from Banglore to Goa.

In January-2020, The Golden Chariot was handed over by the Karnataka Tourism Department to the IRCTCL for the purpose of operations and marketing.

The train was relaunched in November-2022 and has done one trip since then.

== Traction ==
this luxury train runs with diesel traction like Golden Rock-based WDG-3A and Krishnarajapuram-based WDM-3A or WDP-4D so did WDG-4

== Facilities ==
The train offers accommodation in 44 cabins in 18 coaches that are named after dynasties that ruled the region: Kadamba, Hoysala, Rashtrakuta, Ganga, Chalukya, Bahamani, Adil Shahi, Sangama, Satavahana, Yadukula and Vijayanagar.

The facilities also includes two restaurants, a lounge bar, conference room, gym and spa. It has onboard internet connectivity via a USB-stick, and satellite antennae providing live television service in the cabins.

== Destinations ==
The Golden Chariot offers 3 itineraries: Jewels of South, and Pride of Karnataka, each lasting 6 nights & 7 days, and Glimpses of Karnataka, lasting 3 nights & 4 days. It also offers a Dasara festival tour in the month of October.

=== Jewels of South ===
Jewels of South offers a six day tour which departs from Bengaluru and visits Mysuru, Hampi, Kabini River, Hassan, Badami, and Goa, returning to Bengaluru. Mamallapuram has been added to the circuit.

=== Pride of Karnataka ===
Pride of Karnataka departs Bengaluru and visits Bandipur, Mysuru, Dwarasamudra, Chikkamgaluru, Hampi, Pattadakal & Aihole, and Goa, returning to Bengaluru.

=== Glimpses of Karnataka ===
Glimpses of Karnataka departs Bengaluru and visits Bandipur, Mysuru, and Hampi, returning to Bengaluru.

=== Dasara Tour ===
The department of tourism and the Karnataka State Tourism Development Corporation (KSTDC) launched the Dasara tour to showcase the festival.

== Awards ==
The train has been awarded the title of "Asia's Leading Luxury Train" at World Travel Awards, 2013.

== See also ==
- Fairy Queen
- Palace on Wheels
- Royal Orient
- Deccan Odyssey
- Mahaparinirvan Express
- Royal Rajasthan on Wheels
- Maharajas' Express
