= Village on Wheels =

Special train introduced by the Indian Railways to cater to the budget tourists

Village on Wheels is an Indian train introduced by the Indian Railways to cater to budget tourists, especially villagers. The trains connect the selected tourist destinations, usually with a circular schedule. They are managed by the Indian Railway Catering and Tourism Corporation (IRCTC), a public-sector undertaking of the Railways.

This is envisaged to be the more plebeian version of the luxurious Palace on Wheels trains.

'The train is aimed at promoting tourism and connecting one city to another, says the railways official 'The first nine-day journey will cost Rs. 4,500 inclusive of lacto-vegetarian meals and snacks.'

The train has 10 coaches and can accommodate 350 passengers.

== Route ==
- The first route is Rajendra Nagar (start)-Patna-Varanasi-Agra-Mathura-Delhi-Vaishno Devi (Jammu Tawi)-Amritsar-Haridwar (Rishikesh)-Patna -Rajendra Nagar(finish) in nine days.
- The second route is Patna (start)-Mokama-Jasidih-Asansol-Bardhaman-Howrah-Puri-Howrah-Asansol-Patna(finish) in six days.
- The third route is Howrah-Patna-Manmad(Shirdi)-Pune-Mumbai-Ahmedabad-Dwarka-Veraval-Ajmer-Jaipur-Delhi-Patna-Howrah (finish) in twelve days.
- The fourth route is Patna (start)-Howrah-Puri-Tirupati-Madurai-Rameshwaram-Kanyakumari-Thiruvananthapuram-Ernakulam-Howrah-Patna(finish) in twelve days.
- The fifth route is Patna (start) - Prayagraj - Satna - Katni - Jabalpur - Narsinghpur - Itarsi - Narmadapuram - Habibganj - Bhopal Junction - Bhopal Bairagarh - Maksi Junction - Ujjain - Dewas - Indore Junction BG (Indore) - Patna (finish) in 12-days
