= Maharashtra Tourism Development Corporation =

Government of Maharashtra body

- महाराष्ट्र पर्यटन विकास महामंडळ
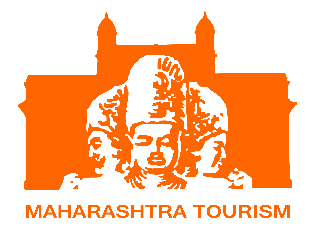

Agency overview
- Formed: 1975
- Jurisdiction: Government of Maharashtra
- Headquarters: Mafatlal House, 1st Floor, H.T. Parekh Marg 169 Backbay Reclamation Churchgate Mumbai - 400020
- Ministers responsible: Shambhuraj Desai, Minister of Tourism; Minister of Mining; Minister of Ex-Servicemen Welfare.; Indranil Naik, Minister of State (Tribal Development; Soil and Water Conservation; Tourism; Higher and Technical Education; Industries; Public Works); Sanjay Khandare, IAS, Secretary, Tourism and Cultural Affairs.
- Agency executives: Neelesh Gatne, IAS, Managing Director, MTDC; Chandrashekhar Jaiswal, General Manager (Additional Charge); Chandrashekhar Jaiswal, Deputy General Manager; Sanjay Patil (Superintending Engineer); Jitendra Sonawane, Chief Accounts Officer.; Sanjay Dhekane, Senior Manager (Legal, Land & Estates, GAD-1); Kshipra Hake – Bora, Senior Manager (Resort Operations, Reservation, Aquatic Sports); Mansi Tatke; Jyoti Koli, Manager (Business Development, Deccan Odyssey, Publicity, BnB – Mumbai Region); Manager (IT, GAD-2); Jyoti Koli, Manager (IT, GAD-2)
- Website: www.mtdc.co

Maharashtra Tourism Development Corporation commonly abbreviated as MTDC, is a body of the Government of Maharashtra responsible for development of tourism in the Indian state of Maharashtra. It has been established under the Companies Act, 1956, (fully owned by Govt. of Maharashtra) for systematic development of tourism on commercial lines, with an authorized share capital of Rs. 25 crore. The paid up share capital of the corporation as on 31 March 2025 is Rs. 1538.88 lakhs.

Since inception, it been involved in the development and maintenance of the various tourist locations of Maharashtra. MTDC owns and maintains resorts at all key tourist centers and having more resorts is on the plan.

MTDC initiates and supports various cultural activities across Maharashtra with the objective to improve tourism in the state. One such example is Sanskruti Arts Festival, Upvan, Thane which MTDC has supported along with TMC (Thane Municipal Corporation).
