= Palace on Wheels =

Indian luxury tourist train

- Logo of the Palace on Wheels
- Entered service: 26 January 1982; 44 years ago
- Operator: Indian Railways
- Line served: New Delhi – Jaipur – Sawai Madhopur – Chittorgarh – Udaipur – Jaisalmer – Jodhpur – Bharatpur – Agra – New Delhi

The Palace on Wheels is a luxury tourist train in India operated jointly by Indian Railways and the Rajasthan Tourism Development Corporation (RTDC). It was launched on 26 January 1982 with the aim of promoting tourism in Rajasthan by offering rail journeys modeled after the personal trains of former Indian princely states.

== History ==
The concept of the train was inspired by the personal carriages of the rulers of princely states such as Rajputana, Vadodara, and the Nizam of Hyderabad. These royal coaches were not used after independence and gauge conversions. The Palace on Wheels was introduced using newly built coaches reflecting the historical style.

The train underwent refurbishments in 1991, 1995, and 2009, the last of which included interior redesign and upgrades to services and dining options.

Operations were temporarily suspended during the COVID-19 pandemic from 2020 to 2022. The train resumed services in October 2022.

== Route ==
The train follows a seven-night, eight-day itinerary operating between September and April. The route includes the following destinations:

- Day 1 – Departure from New Delhi
- Day 2 – Jaipur
- Day 3 – Sawai Madhopur and Chittorgarh
- Day 4 – Udaipur
- Day 5 – Jaisalmer
- Day 6 – Jodhpur
- Day 7 – Bharatpur and Agra
- Day 8 – Return to New Delhi

== Coaches ==
The train consists of 14 coaches and they hauled by diesel traction like WDP-4 , WDG-4D , WDM-3A and WDM-3D, each named after a former princely state of Rajasthan. These include Alwar, Bharatpur, Bikaner, Bundi, Dholpur, Shri Dungargarh, Jaisalmer, Jaipur, Jhalawar, Jodhpur, Kishangarh, Kota, Sirohi, and Udaipur.

Each coach contains three double-occupancy cabins, styled with décor reflecting Rajasthani heritage and equipped with modern amenities such as air conditioning, attached washrooms, and Wi-Fi access.

== Facilities ==
Facilities available on board include:

- Two dining coaches, Sheesh Mahal and Swarn Mahal Restaurant[, serving Indian, continental, and Chinese cuisine
- Lounge bar
- Spa services
- Laundry, postal, and banking services
- Medical assistance available on board

== Gallery ==
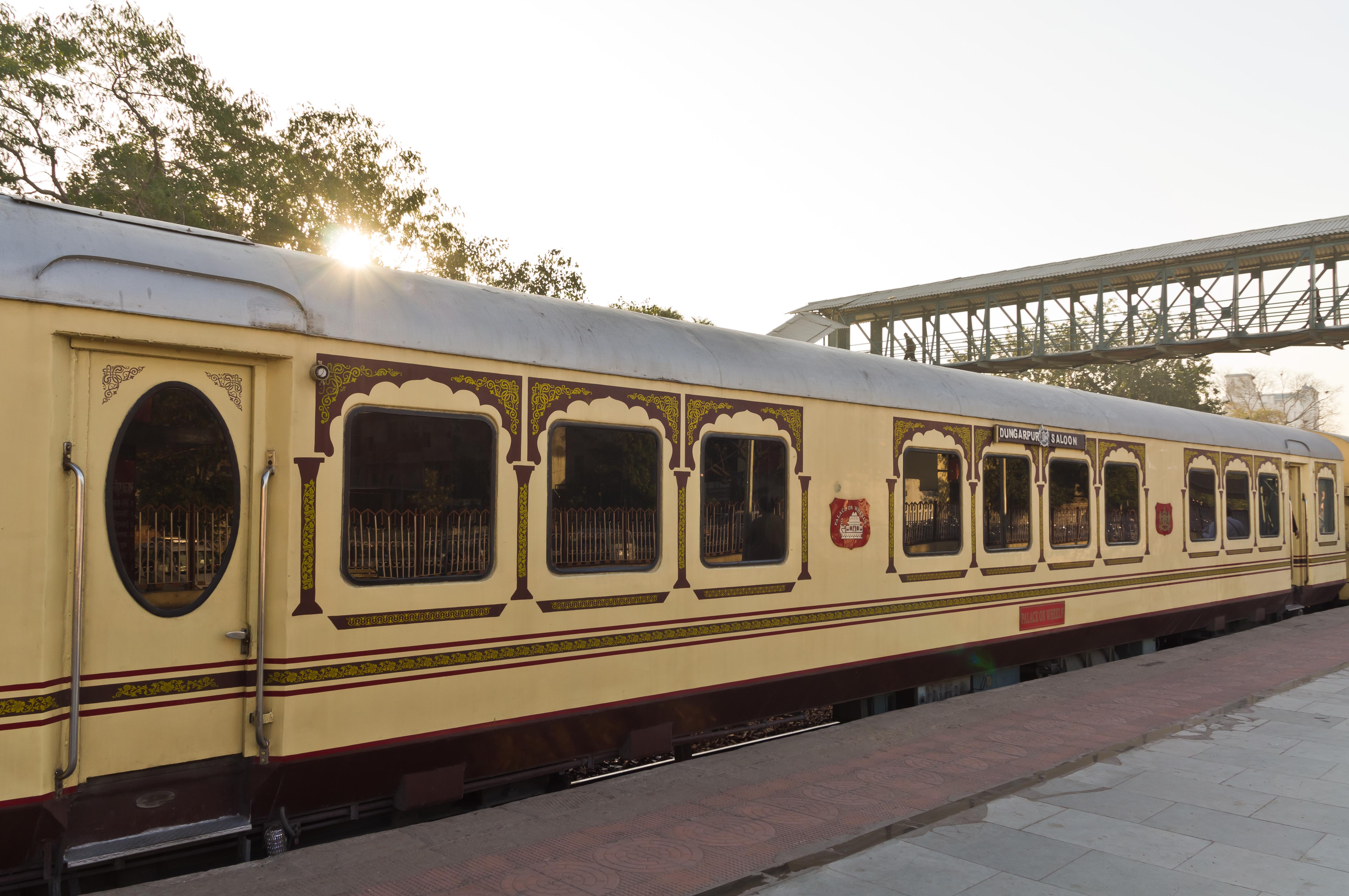
Palace on Wheels stationed at Jaipur Junction railway station

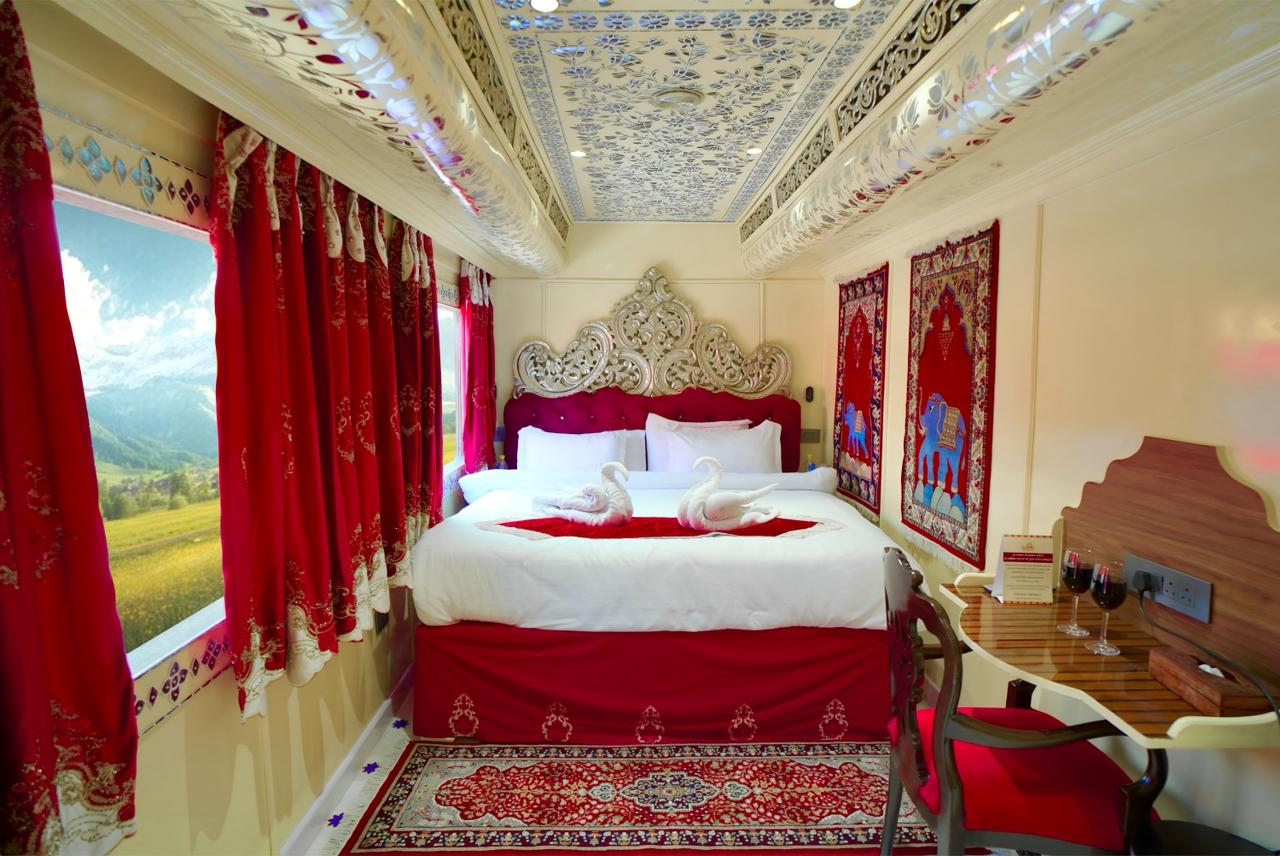
Presidential Suite

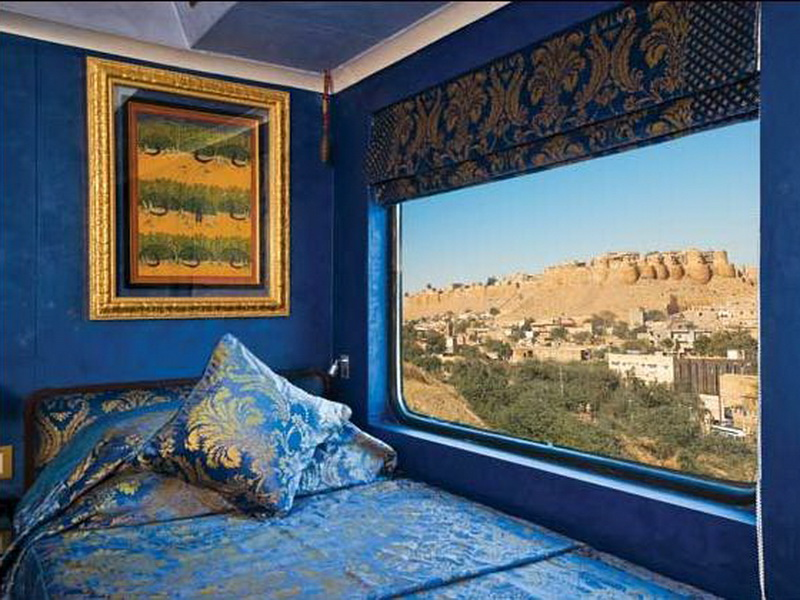
Cabin interior on the train

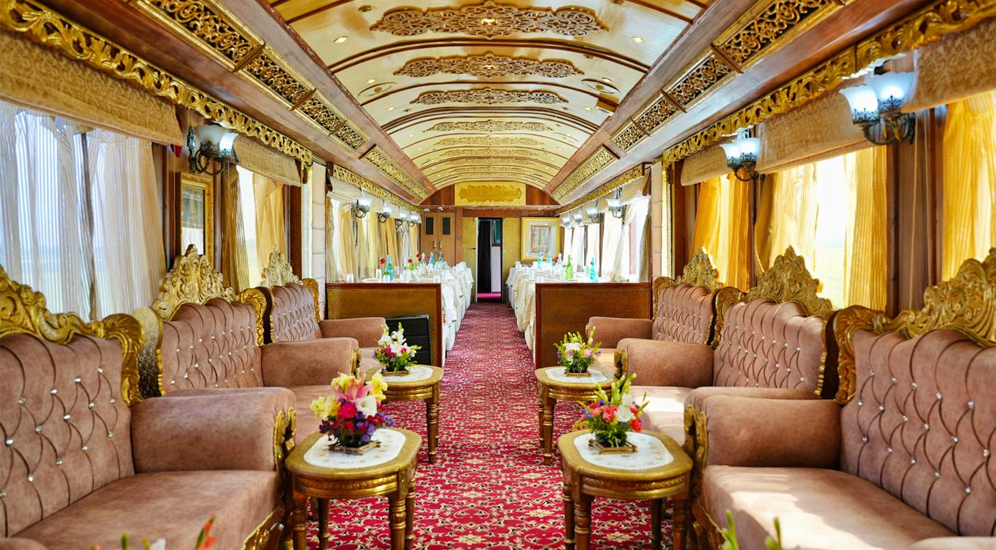
Swarn Mahal Restaurant

== Rebranding ==
In 2017, the train was officially renamed the Heritage Palace on Wheels.

== See also ==
- Maharajas' Express
- Golden Chariot
- Deccan Odyssey
- Royal Orient
- Royal Rajasthan on Wheels
- Fairy Queen (locomotive)
- Village on Wheels
