= Deccan Odyssey =

Luxury train in India

The Deccan Odyssey
- Logo of The Deccan Odyssey
- In service: 2004–present
- Manufacturer: Integral Coach Factory
- Assembly: Chennai, Tamil Nadu, India
- Constructed: 2002–2003
- Entered service: 2004
- Capacity: 88 passengers
- Operators: Indian Railways; MTDC

Specifications
- Train length: 700 metres (2,300 ft)
- Articulated sections: 21

The Deccan Odyssey is an Indian luxury train modelled on the Palace on Wheels luxury train and put into service to boost tourism on the Maharashtra route of the Indian Railways. The train, owned by travel company Cox & Kings since 2014, takes visitors on a variety of seven night, eight day trips across Maharashtra.

== History ==
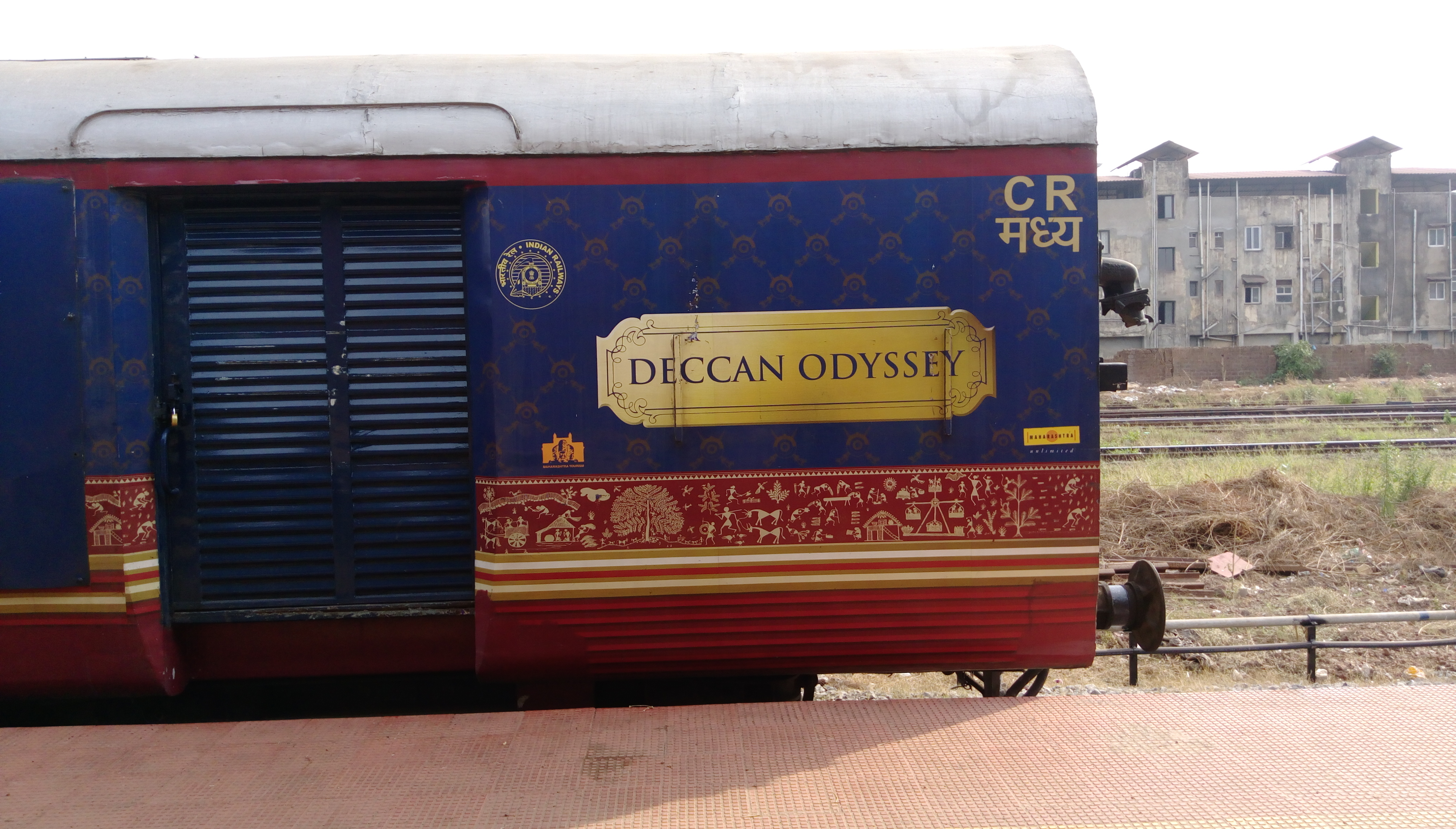
The Deccan Odyssey

The Deccan Odyssey was deployed and started by Indian Railways and the Maharashtra Tourism Development Corp in 2001 in an effort to increase tourism in Maharashtra. Integral Coach Factory started construction in 2002 and finished in 2003.

Its first trip departed on 16-January-2004 for a week-long maiden trip and was flagged off by then Prime Minister Atal Bihari Vajpayee. Due to lack of booking, later journeys in 2004 were suspended by the state government of Maharashtra. However, its operations restarted after the monsoon season.

The train was briefly renamed the Indian Maharaja-Deccan Odyssey under Thomson Cook. It was not in service for the majority of the COVID-19 pandemic and is expected to start operations again in October-2022.

== Traction and Coach Composition ==
since first run was blue paint themed ICF coaches, when the service reopened in 2022 they get a new coat of paint for this coach was red-blue. And it was hauled by both diesel and electric locomotives like WDP-4 and WAP-4

== Design and Amenities ==
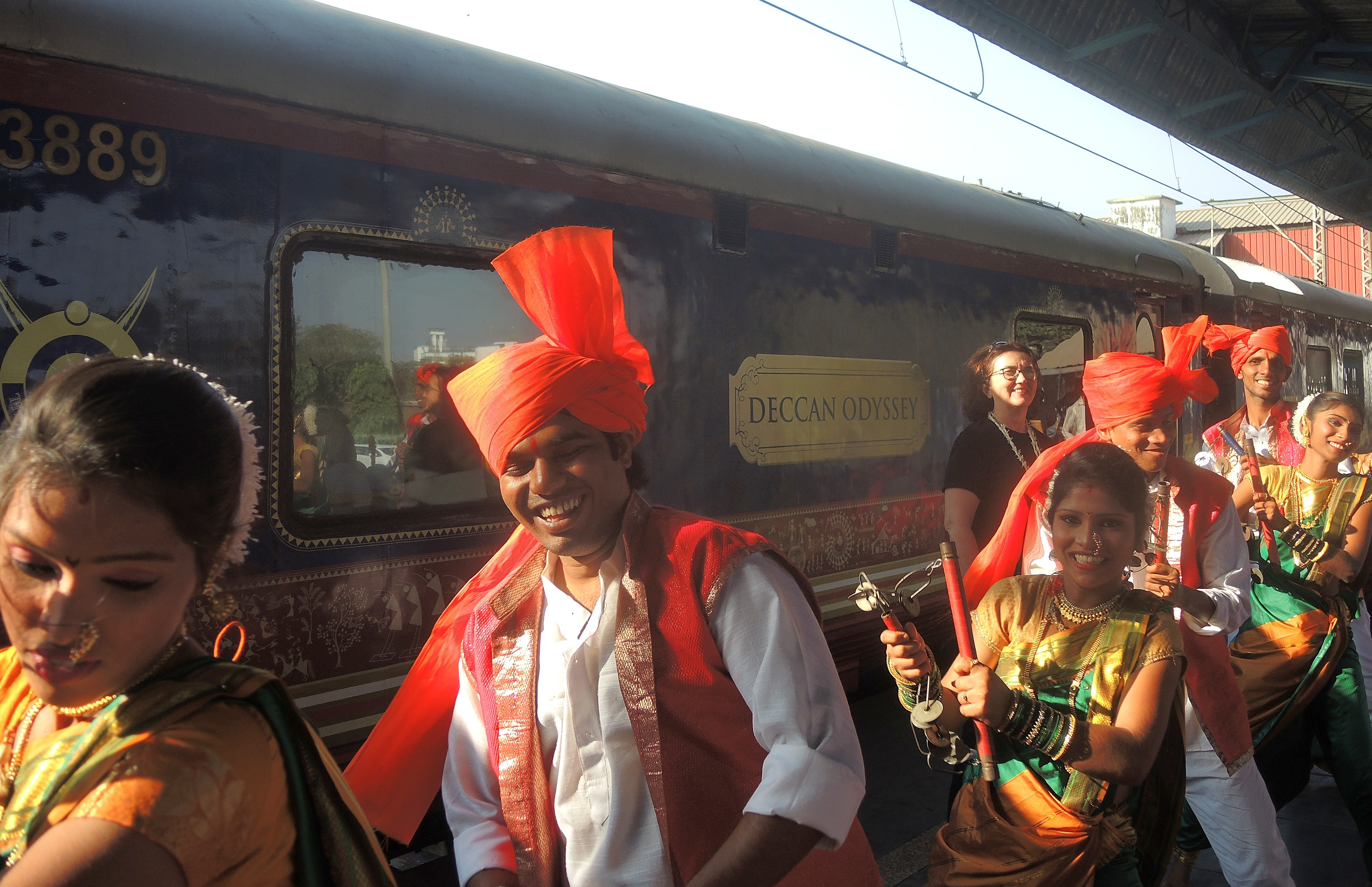
A traditional welcome ceremony in Mumbai before boarding

=== Design ===
The train is 700 metres (2,300 ft)-long and painted in royal blue. It gets its name from the Deccan Plateau which is located in Maharashtra. The design is meant to emulate the luxuries enjoyed by 16th century Maharajas. The train has 21 coaches, each named after places in Maharashtra and can accommodate up to 88 passengers.

=== Amenities ===
Suite amenities include an en suite bathroom, Wi-Fi, a TV, and a cell phone "with all emergency numbers fed in." Guests are serviced by an onboard butler and each suite is marked with a custom nameplate. In addition to accommodation amenities, the train is fully air-conditioned and has a small gym, a spa, salon, library, foreign exchange services, a bar, and a conference room, which can be converted into a dance floor.

There are two restaurants in the train, Waavar and Utsav, which are managed by Taj Hotels.

== Journeys ==
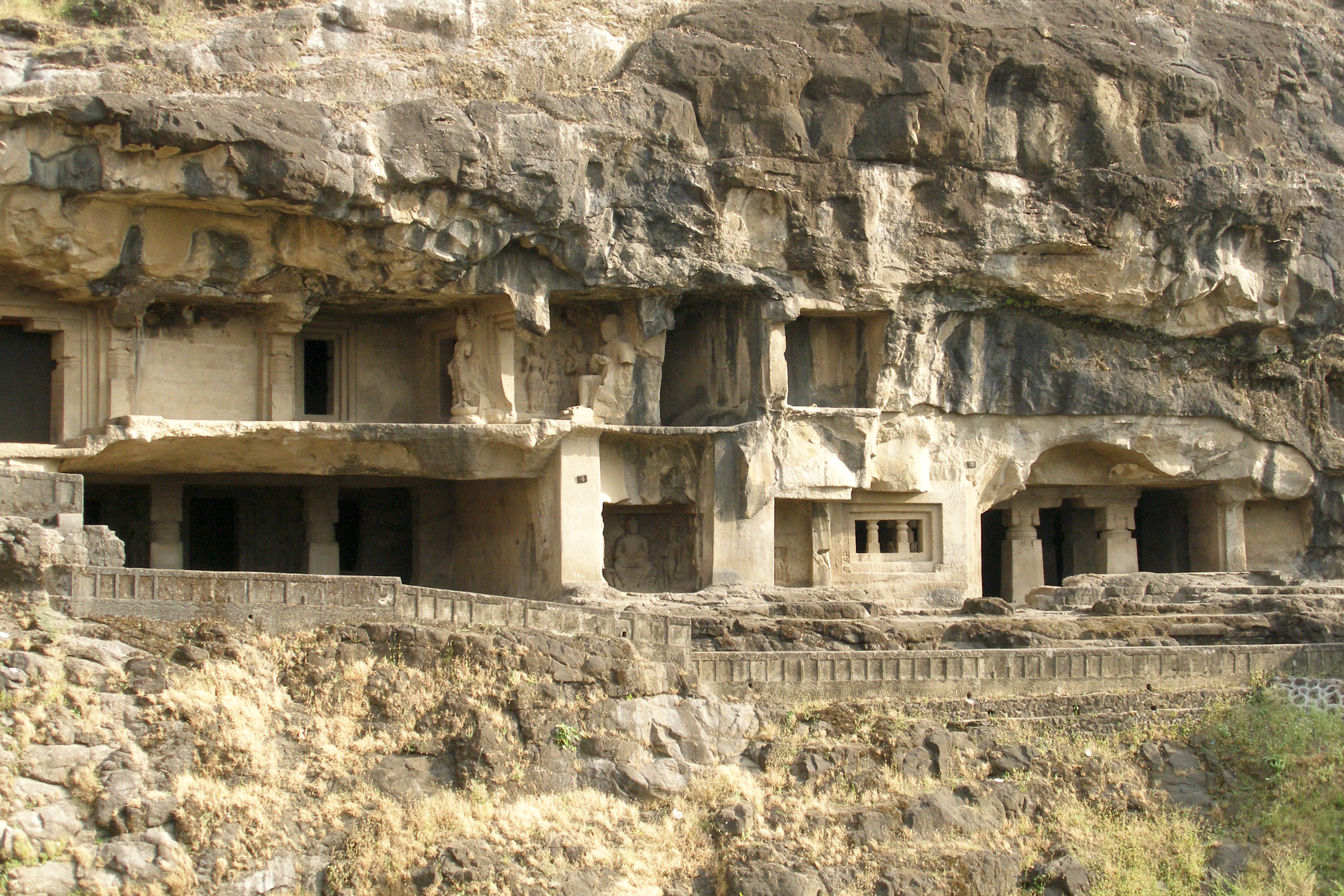
Part of the Ellora Caves, a UNESCO World Heritage Site and stop on several journeys

The Deccan Odyssey offers six different seven day, eight night trips around Maharashtra, typically starting and ending in Mumbai at Chhatrapati Shivaji Terminus with the exception of the Indian Odyssey journey, which starts in New Delhi and ends in Mumbai, and the Indian Sojourn journey, which starts in Mumbai and ends in Delhi.

Guests can adhere to pre-arranged sightseeing tours or explore each stop on their own. Trips typically run between October and May.

As of 2022, the journeys include:

- Maharashtra Splendor: Mumbai, Nashik (Grover Zampa Vineyards), Chhatrapati Sambhajinagar (Ellora Caves), Ajanta Caves, Kolhapur, Goa, Sindhudurg, Mumbai. UNESCO World Heritage Sites on this journey include the Ajanta and Ellora Caves.
- Indian Odyssey: Delhi, Sawai Madhopur (Ranthambore National Park), Agra, Jaipur, Udaipur, Vadodara, Chhatrapati Sambhajinagar, Ellora Caves, Mumbai. UNESCO World Heritage Sites on this journey include Amer Fort, the Taj Mahal, Jantar Mantar, Champaner-Pavagadh Archaeological Park, and Ellora Caves.
- Jewels of the Deccan: Mumbai, Vijayapura, Aihole, Pattadakal, Hampi, Hyderabad, Ellora Caves, Ajanta Caves, Mumbai. UNESCO World Heritage Sites on this journey include the Ellora and Ajanta Caves and Hampi.
- Maharashtra Wild Trail Journey: Mumbai, Chhatrapati Sambhajinagar (Ellora Caves), Ramtek (Pench National Park), Tadoba, Ajanta Caves, Nashik, Mumbai. UNESCO World Heritage Sites on this journey include the Ellora and Ajanta Caves.
- Hidden Treasures of Gujarat: Mumbai, Vadodara, Palitana, Sasan Gir & Somnath, Little Rann of Kutch, Modhera & Patan, Nashik, Mumbai. UNESCO World Heritage Sites on this journey include the Wild Ass Wildlife Sanctuary, Rani ki vav, and Champaner-Pavagadh Archaeological Park.
- Indian Sojurn: Mumbai, Vadodara, Udaipur, Jodhpur, Agra, Sawai Madhopur (Ranthambore National Park), Jaipur, Delhi. UNESCO World Heritage Sites on this journey include Champaner-Pavagadh Archaeological Park, Amer Fort, and the Taj Mahal.

Apart from the trip list, the Deccan Odyssey also goes on other shorter "special journeys". In 2010, the Spiritual Journey to the Guru's Abode explored Kiratpur Sahib, Anandpur Sahib (Keshgarh Sahib), Amritsar (Akal Takht Sahib), Bathinda (Damdama Sahib), Jaipur, Agra, Nanded (Hazur Sahib), Mumbai, Patna (Patna Sahib), and Delhi, with a focus on Sikh takhts. In 2017, the Susegado Goa special journey explored the Konkan Coast through Mumbai, Goa, Thivim, Karmali, and Verna. In 2022, an abbreviated Indian Odyssey journey—Delhi, Sawai Madhopur, Agra, Jaipur—was available.

Most passengers are international travellers and are charged US$7,320 per single occupancy deluxe cabin for a seven night, eight day trip, while Indian nationals pay ₹5,12,400.

== Awards ==
The Deccan Odyssey has won the title of Asia's Leading Luxury Train at the World Travel Awards in 2010–2012, 2014, and 2015–2019. In 2018, the train earned recognition for being the first to win the Asia's Leading Luxury Train award five consecutive times.

The train was also named World's Leading Luxury Train in 2019. Previous nominations include World's Leading Travel Experience by Train (2009-2012), World's Leading Luxury Train (2010-2018, 2020), and Asia's Leading Luxury Train (2013, 2020–2021).
