= Royal Rajasthan on Wheels =

Indian luxury tourist train

- Royal Rajasthan on Wheels logo
- Entered service: January 2009 – present
- Operator: Indian Railways

The Royal Rajasthan on Wheels is a luxury tourist train operated by Indian Railways in association with the Rajasthan Tourism Development Corporation. Launched in January 2009, it is modelled on the Palace on Wheels and follows a similar route through the state of Rajasthan as well as a few locations in other states.

The tour itinerary includes New Delhi, Jodhpur, Udaipur, Chittorgarh, Sawai Madhopur, Jaipur, Khajuraho, Varanasi, and Agra. Travellers are taken to several prominent tourist, wildlife, and heritage sites across Rajasthan.

== See also ==
- Luxury rail in India
