= Indian Railways =

State railway company of India

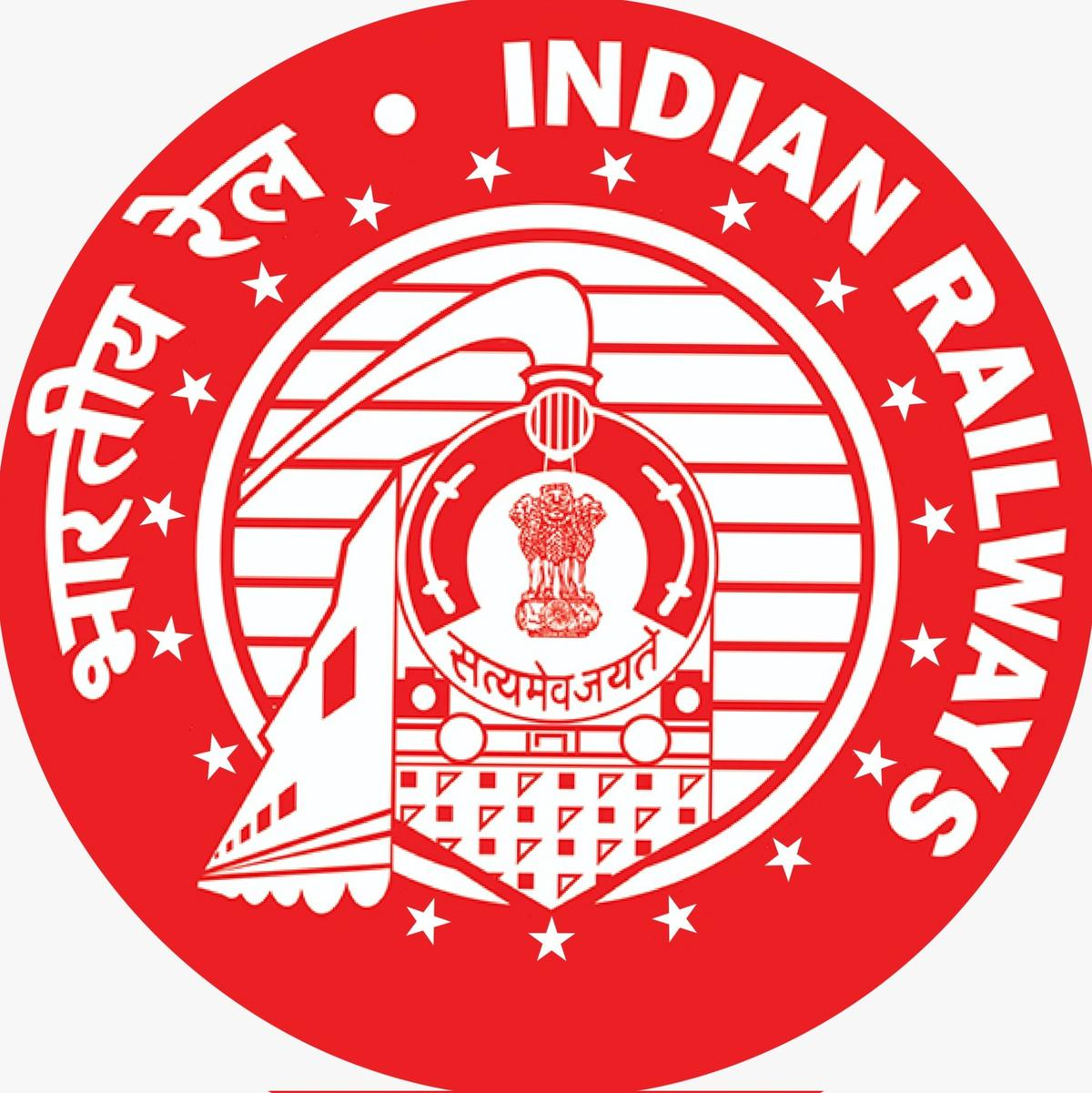
- Logo of Indian Railways

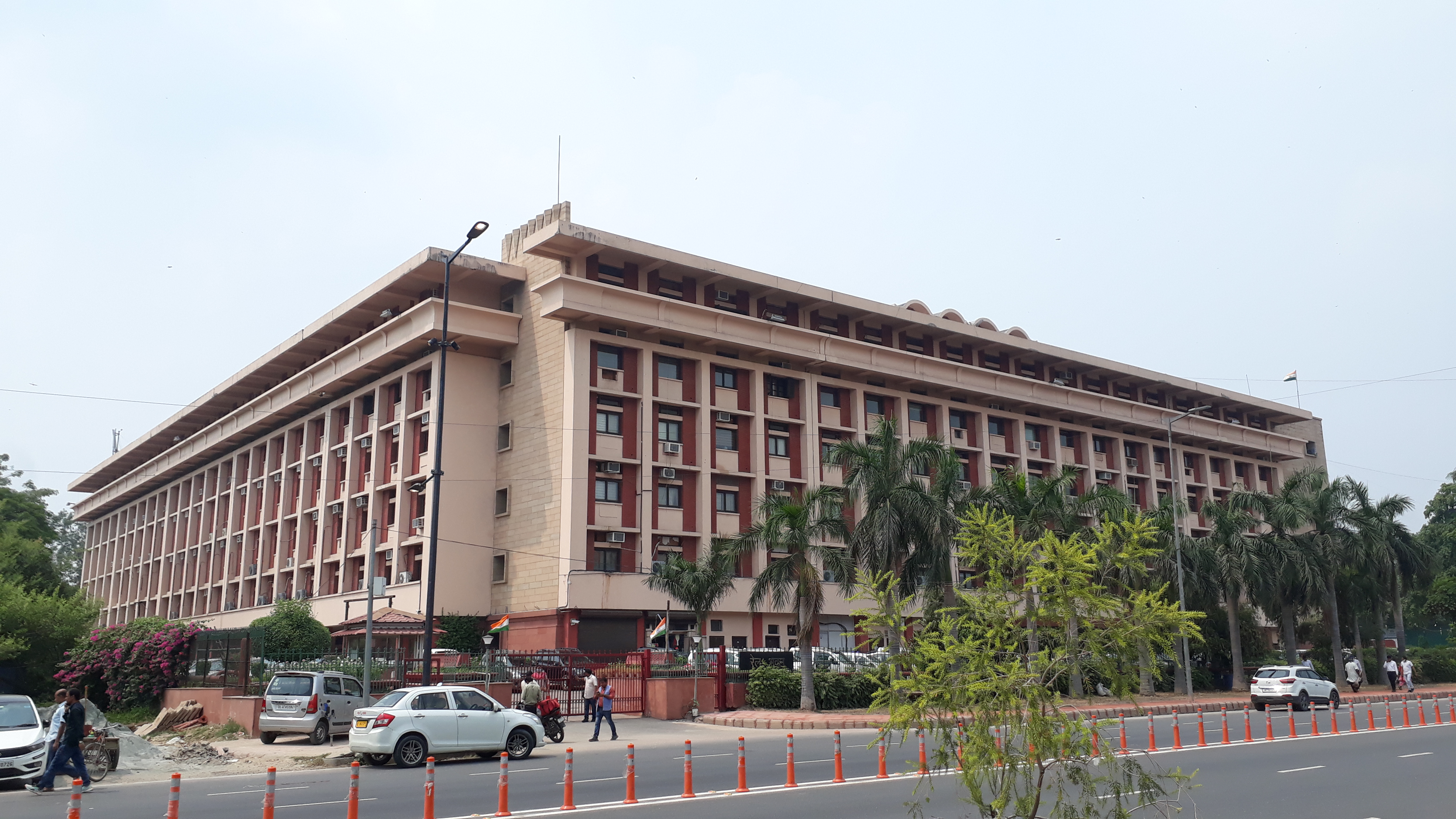
- Rail Bhawan, the headquarters of Indian Railways in New Delhi
- Native name: Indian Railways
- Type: Statutory body State-owned enterprise
- Industry: Rail transport
- Founded: 16 April 1853 (173 years ago)
- Headquarters: Rail Bhawan, New Delhi, India
- Area served: India
- Key people: Ashwini Vaishnaw (Minister for Railways); Satish Kumar (Chairman and CEO)
- Services: Passenger railway; Rail freight transport; Parcel carrier; Catering; Tourism; Parking lot operations; Other related services
- Revenue: ▲₹2,560 billion (US$27 billion) (2023–24)
- Net income: ▲₹47.61 billion (US$510 million) (2023–24)
- Owner: Ministry of Railways, Government of India (100%)
- Number of employees: 1,252,200 (31 March 2024)
- Divisions: 18 zones: Southern Railway; Central Railway; Western Railway; Eastern Railway; Northern Railway; North Eastern Railway; South Eastern Railway; Northeast Frontier Railway; South Central Railway; Metro Railway, Kolkata; East Central Railway; South East Central Railway; North Western Railway; East Coast Railway; North Central Railway; South Western Railway; West Central Railway; South Coast Railway
- Subsidiaries: List: Braithwaite and Company; Container Corporation of India; Centre for Railway Information Systems; Central Organisation for Railway Electrification; Bhartiya Rail Bijlee Company Limited; Indian Railway Catering and Tourism Corporation; Indian Railway Finance Corporation; Ircon International; Konkan Railway Corporation; Mumbai Railway Vikas Corporation; National High Speed Rail Corporation Limited; Pipavav Railway Corporation Limited; Rail India Technical and Economic Service; Rail Vikas Nigam; RailTel

Technical
- Line length: 69,439.000 km (43,147.394 mi)
- Track length: 135,207 km (84,014 mi)
- Track gauge: 1,676 mm (5 ft 6 in); 1,000 mm (3 ft 3 3/8 in); 762 mm (2 ft 6 in); 610 mm (2 ft)
- Electrification: 69,315 km (43,070 mi) (Note: As of October 2025)
- Website: Official website

Indian Railways is a state-owned enterprise organised as a departmental undertaking of the Ministry of Railways of the Government of India and operates India's national railway system. (Note: In India, State-owned enterprises can be organised into three forms: Departmental undertakings, statutory corporations, or public companies. A departmental undertaking functions under the respective ministry or department of government, and is fully financed by the ministry.) As of 2024, it manages the fourth largest national railway system by size, with a track length of 135,207 km (84,014 mi), running track length of 109,748 km (68,194 mi) and route length of 69,181 km (42,987 mi), of which 66,820 km (41,520 mi) is 1,676 mm (5 ft 6 in) broad-gauge. As of October 2025, approximately 99.1% of the broad-gauge railway network had been electrified. With more than 1.2 million employees, it is the ninth-largest employer of the world and the second largest employer of India.

In 1951, the Indian Railways was established by the amalgamation of 42 different railway companies operating in the country, spanning a total of 55,000 km (34,000 mi). The railway network across the country was reorganized into six regional zones in 1951–52 for administrative purposes, which was gradually expanded to 18 zones over the years. (Note: 17 operational and one non-operational zone. South Coast Railway zone is announced and yet to be operational as of 2025.)

The first steam locomotive hauled railway operated in 1837 in Madras for ferrying cargo. The first passenger railway was operated in 1853 between Bombay and Thane. In 1925, the first electric train ran in Bombay on DC traction. The first locomotive manufacturing unit was commissioned in 1950 at Chittaranjan with the first coach manufacturing unit set-up at Madras in 1955.

Indian Railways runs various classes of express, passenger, suburban, and freight trains. In 2023–24, it operated 13,198 passenger trains on average daily covering 7,325 stations and carried 6.905 billion passengers. It operated 11,724 freight trains on average daily and transported 1588.06 million tonnes of freight. Indian Railways operates multiple classes of rolling stock, manufactured by self-owned coach-production facilities. As of March 2024, Indian Railways' rolling stock consisted of 327,991 freight wagons, and 91,948 passenger coaches (including multiple unit coaches). As of February 2026, Indian Railways had 13,569 electric, 4,169 diesel and 16 steam locomotives in its inventory.

== History ==
=== 1832–1899 ===
In 1832 the proposal to construct the first railway line in India at Madras was made. In 1835, a railway track was constructed between Red Hills and Chintadripet in Madras and became operational in 1837. It was hauled by a rotary steam engine imported from England and was used for ferrying granite.

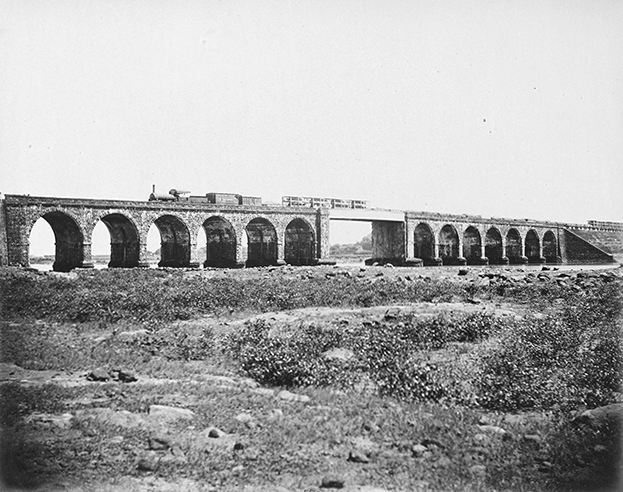
The railway bridge near Thane in 1855

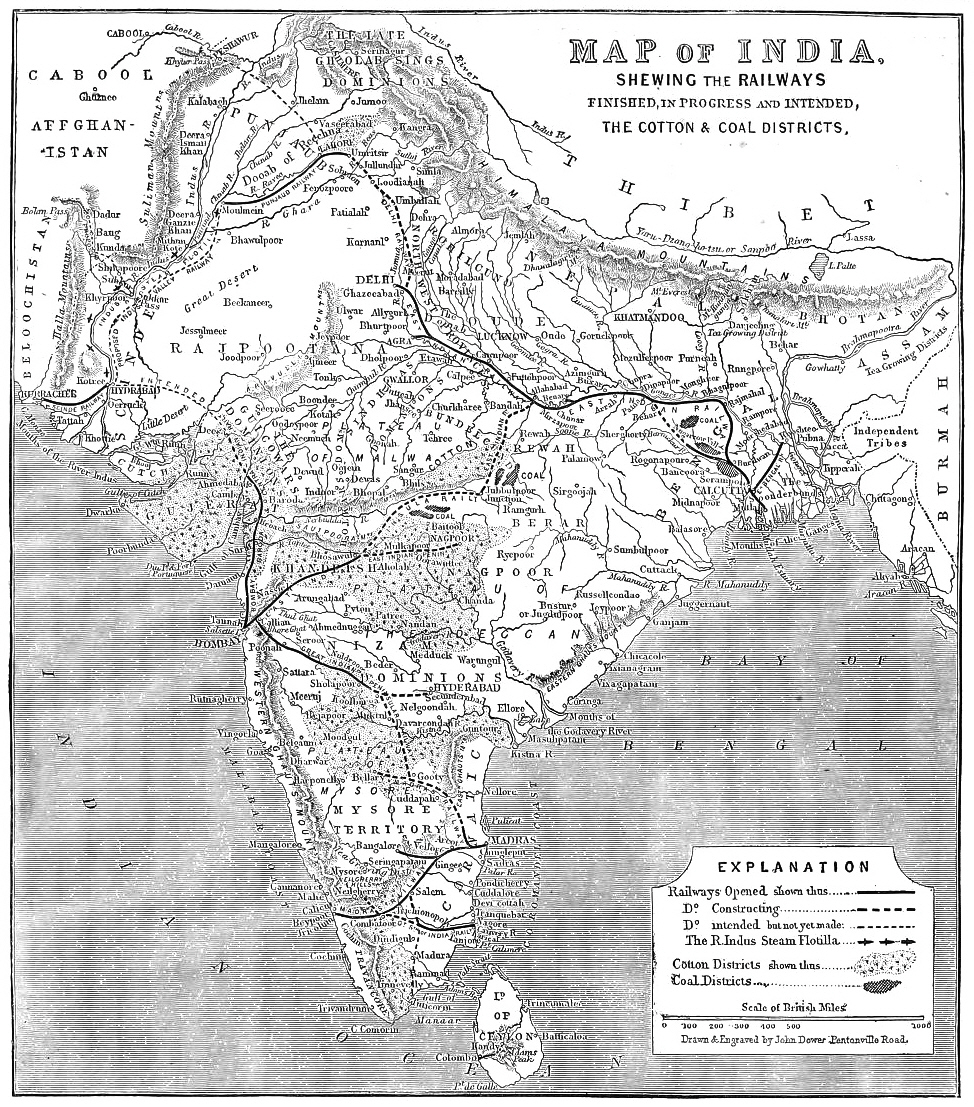
Railway map of India in 1865

The Madras Railway was established in 1845 and the Great Indian Peninsular Railway was incorporated in 1849. Temporary railway lines were built such as the railway line at Dowleswaram built by Arthur Cotton to supply stone for the construction of a dam over the Godavari River in 1845 and the Solani aqueduct railway, built by Proby Cautley in Roorkee to transport construction materials for an aqueduct over the Solani river in 1851. In 1852, a steam locomotive imported from England was tried at Byculla. In 1853, the first passenger train on 1,676 mm (5 ft 6 in) broad gauge ran for 34 km (21 mi) between Bombay and Thane which had 14-carriages carrying 400 people, hauled by three steam locomotives: the Sahib, Sindh and Sultan. This day is considered to be the formation date of the Indian Railways and is marked annually as Indian Railways Day.

The Thane viaducts, the first railway bridges, were built over the Thane creek when the Mumbai-Thane line was extended to Kalyan in May 1854. Eastern India's first passenger train ran 39 km (24 mi) from Howrah, near Calcutta, to Hoogly on 15 August 1854. The construction of the first main line in South India between Royapuram in Madras and Arcot started in 1853, which became operational on 1 July 1856. On 24 February 1873, a horse-drawn 3.8 km (2.4 mi) tram opened in Calcutta between Sealdah and Armenian Ghat street. In 1875, a railway line was opened between Mokama and Darbhanga by the local ruler Lakshmeshwar Singh through Tirhut Railway. On 9 May 1874, a horse-drawn tramway began operation in Bombay between Colaba and Parel. In 1879, the Nizam's Guaranteed State Railway was established which built railway lines across the then Hyderabad State from Kachiguda. In 1877, Ajmer built "F1" class metre-gauge steam locomotive no. 734 became the first indigenously built locomotive in India. In 1897, lighting in passenger coaches was introduced by Jodhpur Railway, the first to introduce electric lighting as a standard fixture.

=== 1900–1999 ===
Railway map of India in 1914

The first railway budget was presented in 1924. On 3 February 1925, the first electric train ran between Bombay and Kurla, hauled by a SLM electric locomotive on DC traction. In 1925, the first Electric Multiple Units (EMU) were introduced in Bombay with 1500 V DC units imported from Cammell Laird and Uerdingenwagonfabrik. Chennai suburban railway started operating in 1931 with a single metre-gauge line from Chennai Beach to Tambaram. In the period between 1925 and 1944, the management of the railway companies in the British presidencies and provinces was taken over by the Government.

In 1950, there were about 42 different railway companies operating about 55,000 km (34,000 mi) tracks across the country. These railway companies were amalgamated in steps to form a single entity named as Indian Railways. In December 1950, the Central Advisory Committee for Railways approved the plan for re-organizing Indian Railways into six regional zones with the Southern (14 April 1951), Central (5 November 1951), and Western (5 November 1951) zones being the first to be created. In 1952, fans and lights were mandated for all compartments in passenger trains and sleeping accommodations were introduced in coaches. The first diesel locomotive used in India was fabricated by North British Locomotive Company in 1954.

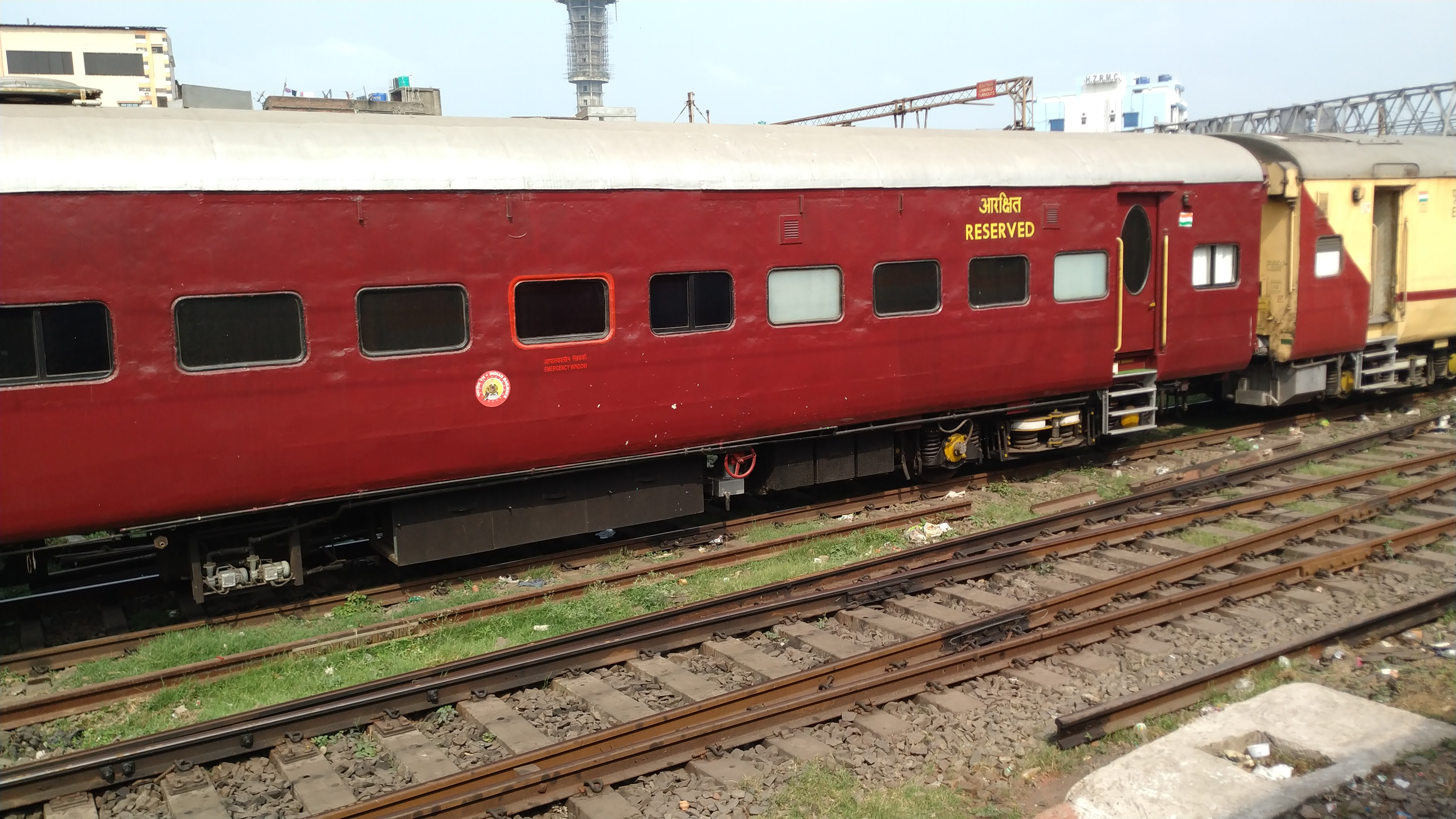
A typical red-colored ICF coach used by the Indian Railways till the late 1990s

The first locomotive manufacturing unit at Chittaranjan was commissioned in 1950. The first rail coaches were manufactured in India from 1956 when the Integral Coach Factory was established at Madras. In 1956, the first air-conditioned train plied between Howrah and New Delhi. In 1957, Indian Railways adopted 25 kV AC traction with the first runs beginning in December 1959 with the WAM-1 locomotives. The first containerized freight rail transport began between Bombay and Ahmedabad in 1966. In 1969, the Government of India announced the introduction of a new express train capable of reaching speeds of up to 120 km/h (75 mph) in the railway budget and the first Rajdhani Express was flagged off from New Delhi to Howrah in March 1969. In 1974, Indian Railways endured a 20-day strike. The first metro rail was introduced in Calcutta on 24 October 1984.

In 1986, computerized ticketing and reservations were introduced. In 1988, the first Shatabdi Express was introduced between New Delhi and Jhansi. Two years later, the first self-printing ticket machine (SPTM) was introduced in Delhi. In 1993, air-conditioned three-tier and sleeper were introduced. In 1995, Chennai MRTS became the first operational elevated railway line in India. Centralized computer reservation system was deployed in Delhi, Mumbai and Chennai in September 1996, coupon validating machines (CVMs) were introduced at Mumbai CSMT in 1998 and the nationwide concierge system began operation on 18 April 1999.

=== 2000–present ===
The Indian Railways website went online in February 2000. Indian Railways Catering and Tourism Corporation (IRCTC) was incorporated in 1999 and online ticketing was introduced on 3 August 2002 through IRCTC. In 2015, the first Compressed Natural Gas (CNG) powered trains were rolled out. Since 1925, the Railway budget was presented before the Union budget till 2016. The central government approved the merger of the Rail and General budgets from 2017. On 31 March 2017, Indian Railways announced a target of electrifying the entire rail network would be electrified by 2023. In March 2020, Indian Railways announced a nationwide shutdown of passenger service to combat the COVID-19 pandemic in India with the freight operations continuing to transport essential goods. The railways resumed passenger services in a phased manner in May 2020.

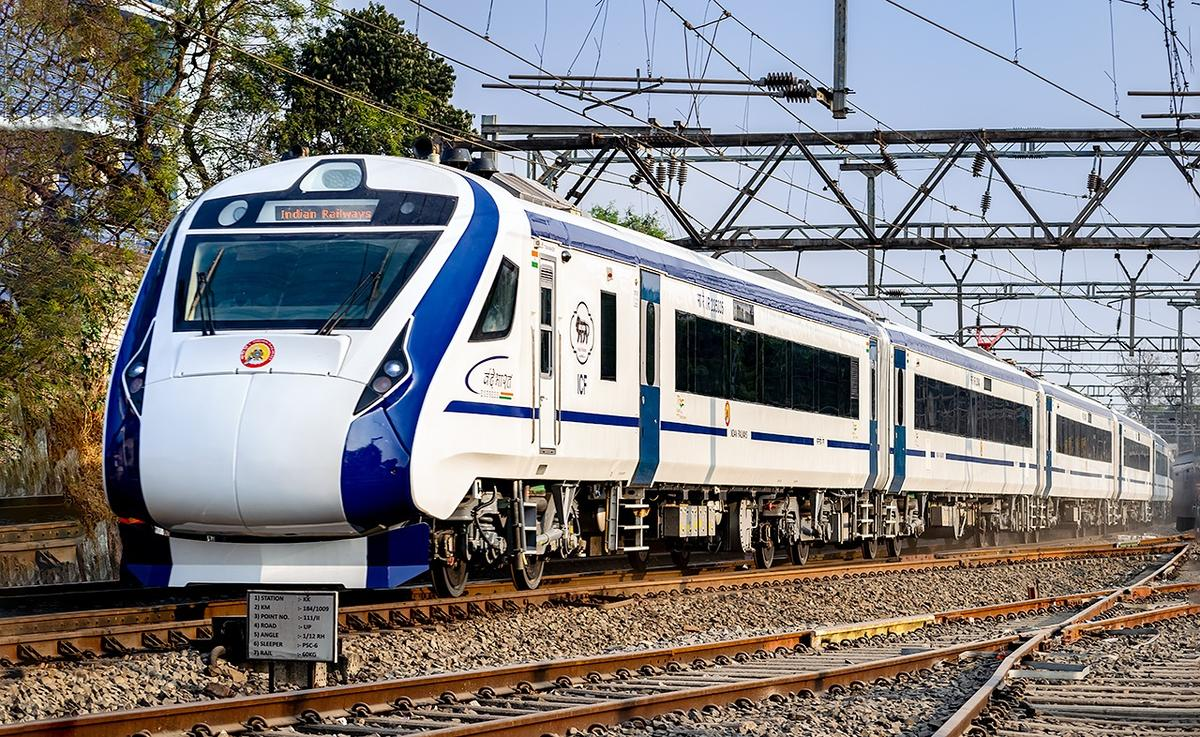
Introduced in 2019, Vande Bharat Express operating on a train-set built by ICF, is the fastest train in India

Starting in the 2010s, various infrastructure modernization projects have been undertaken including high-speed rail, redevelopment of 400 stations, doubling tracks to reduce congestion, refurbishing of coaches, Global Positioning System (GPS)-enabled tracking of trains and modernization of locomotives. In 2018, a semi-high speed self-propelled train-set capable of reaching speeds of over 160 km/h (99 mph) was rolled out from ICF and the Vande Bharat Express was launched in 2019. Indian Railways announced plans to become a net-zero carbon emission railway by 2030 and has implemented rainwater harvesting at stations, reforestation along the tracks, introduction of solar-powered trains, installation of solar and wind power generation facilities, and sustainable LED lighting at all the stations. Indian railways removed all unstaffed level crossings by 2019 with staffed level crossings being replaced by bridges. Other safety projects include the extension of an automated fire alarm system to all air-conditioned coaches and GPS-enabled Fog Pilot Assistance System railway signalling devices. In 2020, Indian Railways allowed the operation of private passenger trains for the first time with the first train flagged off from Coimbatore in June 2022.

== Organisation ==
=== Structure ===
Indian Railways is a state-owned enterprise that is organised as a departmental undertaking of the Ministry of Railways of the Government of India. It is governed by a Railway Board, which acts on behalf of the Ministry of Railways. The five member Railway board is headed by a chairman cum chief executive officer, and consists of members responsible for infrastructure, traction & rolling stock, operations & business development, and finance. Additionally, officers on special duty include those overseeing human resources, Railway Protection Force, health and safety.

Indian Railways is divided into 18 administrative zones (17 operational), headed by general managers which are further subdivided into 68 operating divisions, headed by divisional railway managers (DRM). The divisional officers of the respective operating verticals report to the DRMs and divisional heads and are tasked with the operation and maintenance of assets. Station masters control individual stations and train movements through their stations' territory. In addition, there are a number of manufacturing units, training establishments, PSUs and other undertakings under the purview of the Indian Railways.

Zones of Indian Railways
No.	Zone	Code	HQ	Estd.
1	Southern	SR	Chennai	1951
2	Central	CR	Mumbai CSMT	1951
3	Western	WR	Mumbai (Churchgate)	1951
4	Eastern	ER	Kolkata	1952
5	Northern	NR	Delhi	1952
6	North Eastern	NER	Gorakhpur	1952

Zones of Indian Railways
No.	Zone	Code	HQ	Estd.
7	South Eastern	SER	Kolkata	1955
8	Northeast Frontier	NFR	Guwahati	1958
9	South Central	SCR	Secunderabad	1966
10	East Central	ECR	Hajipur	2002
11	South East Central	SECR	Bilaspur	2003
12	North Western	NWR	Jaipur	2002

Zones of Indian Railways
No.	Zone	Code	HQ	Estd.
13	East Coast	ECoR	Bhubaneswar	2003
14	North Central	NCR	Prayagraj	2003
15	South Western	SWR	Hubballi	2003
16	West Central	WCR	Jabalpur	2003
17	South Coast	SCoR	Visakhapatnam	2026
18	Konkan Railway	KR	Navi Mumbai	1998

=== Human resources ===
Staff are classified into gazetted (Groups A and B) and non-gazetted (Groups C and D) employees with gazetted employees carrying out executive/managerial level tasks. As of 31 March 2024, Groups A & B constitute 1.4% of the total workforce, while Group C (into which Group D merged before 2020) accounts for 98.6%. 80% of Group-A employees are recruited through Indian Railways Management Service with remaining through promotions.

Group B employees are recruited by departmental promotional exams of Group C employees. Recruitment of Group C employees are through exams conducted by the Railway Recruitment Control Board (RRCB) and Group D staffs are recruited by zonal Railway Recruitment Cells (RRC). Indian Railways operates seven centralized training institutes and 295 training centers. It also provides housing, healthcare and education facilities for staff.

As of 2024, Indian railways employed 1.25 million people. In March 2025, there were 0.13 million women employees including 2,162 loco pilots, 794 train managers, and 1,699 station masters.

=== Subsidiaries ===
Indian Railways has various public sector undertakings (PSUs) and other organisations under its purview:

Name	Sector	Established	Notes
Bhartiya Rail Bijlee Company Limited (BRBCL)	Power	2007	Joint Venture with NTPC; 26% ownership
Braithwaite & Co.	Heavy industry	1913	Transferred from Ministry of Heavy Industries in 2010
Centre for Railway Information Systems (CRIS)	Information technology	1986	
Container Corporation of India (CONCOR)	Intermodal freight transport	1988	
Dedicated Freight Corridor Corporation of India (DFCCIL)	Rail freight infrastructure development	2006	
Indian Railway Catering and Tourism Corporation (IRCTC)	Catering, Ticketing and Tourism	1999	67% ownership
Indian Railway Finance Corporation (IRFC)	Financial services	1986	
Ircon International	Rail infrastructure development	1976	
Kolkata Metro Rail Corporation (KMRCL)	Public Transport	2008	74% ownership
Konkan Railway Corporation (KRCL)	Rail infrastructure construction and operation	1990	To be merged with Indian Railways
Mumbai Railway Vikas Corporation (MRVC)	Suburban rail operation & development	1999	51% ownership
National High Speed Rail Corporation (NHSRC)	High-speed rail construction & operation	2016	
Pipavav Railway Corporation	Operation of Pipavav port line	2000	Joint venture with Pipavav Port; 50% ownership
Rail India Technical and Economic Service (RITES)	Consulting	1974	
Rail Vikas Nigam (RVN)	Rail Infrastructure development	2003	
RailTel	Telecommunications	2000	

Indian Railways also has multiple bodies and undertakings under its purview such as:

- Central Warehousing Corporation (CWC)
- Central Railside Warehouse Company Limited (CRWCL)
- Commission of Railway Safety (CRS)
- Central Organisation for Modernisation of Workshops (COMW)
- Central Organisation for Railway Electrification (CORE)
- Indian Railway Health Service (IRHS)
- Passenger Amenities Committee
- Rail Land Development Authority (RLDA)
- Railway Protection Force (RPF)
- Railway Recruitment Control Board (RRCB)
- Railways Sports Promotion Board (RSPB)
- Research Design and Standards Organisation (RDSO)

== Infrastructure and operations ==
=== Rolling stock ===
==== Locomotives ====
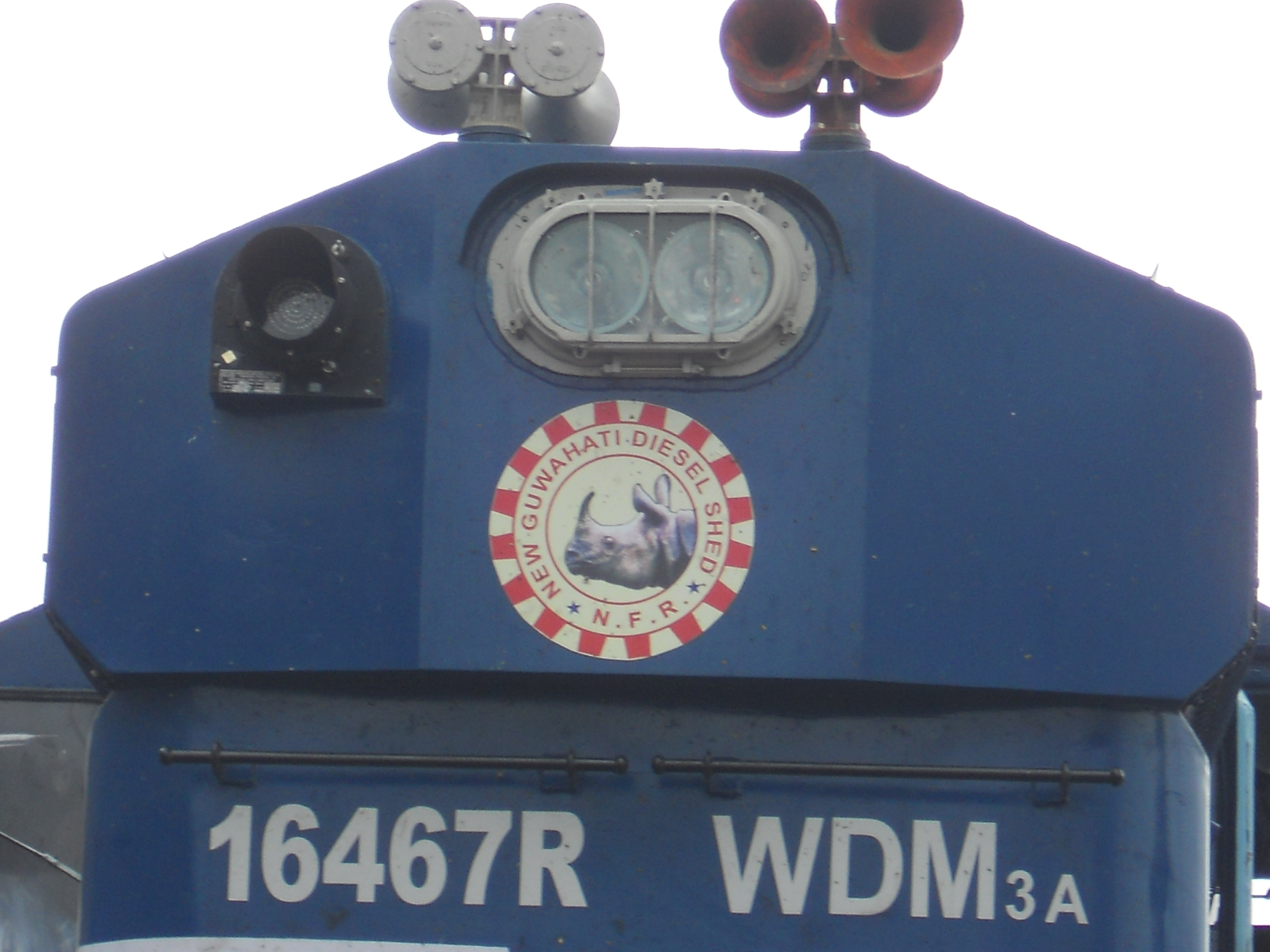
Close-up of a locomotive with the classification and number; WDM3A indicates a Broad gauge (W), Diesel (D), Mixed use (M), 3100 HP (3A) locomotive

The first trains in the 1800s were hauled by imported steam locomotives. In 1877, the first locomotive was built in India. Electric locomotives were introduced in 1925 and diesel locomotives later in 1954. By 1990s, steam locomotives were phased out and are currently operated only on mountain railways and on heritage trains. Locomotives are classified by track gauge (broad/metre/narrow/narrower), motive power (electric/diesel/battery), function (passenger/goods/mixed), power rating (x1000 HP) and model in a four or five letter code. The locomotives may be Longer Hood Front (LHF), where the driver cabin is behind the hood of the engine or Short Hood Front (SHF), where the cabin is located towards the front. Multiple units (MU) are propelled by locomotives integrated with train-sets. In 2015, the first compressed natural gas (CNG) powered MUs were rolled out by ICF. In 2018, the semi-high speed self-propelled Vande Bharat train-set was rolled out from ICF. Locomotives are manufactured by five owned manufacturing units of the Indian Railways and BHEL. As of 2021, 37% of the trains were operated by diesel locomotives and rest mostly by electric locomotives. As of November 2025, Indian Railways had 10,675 electric, 4,397 diesel, and 16 steam locomotives in its inventory.

==== Passenger coaches ====
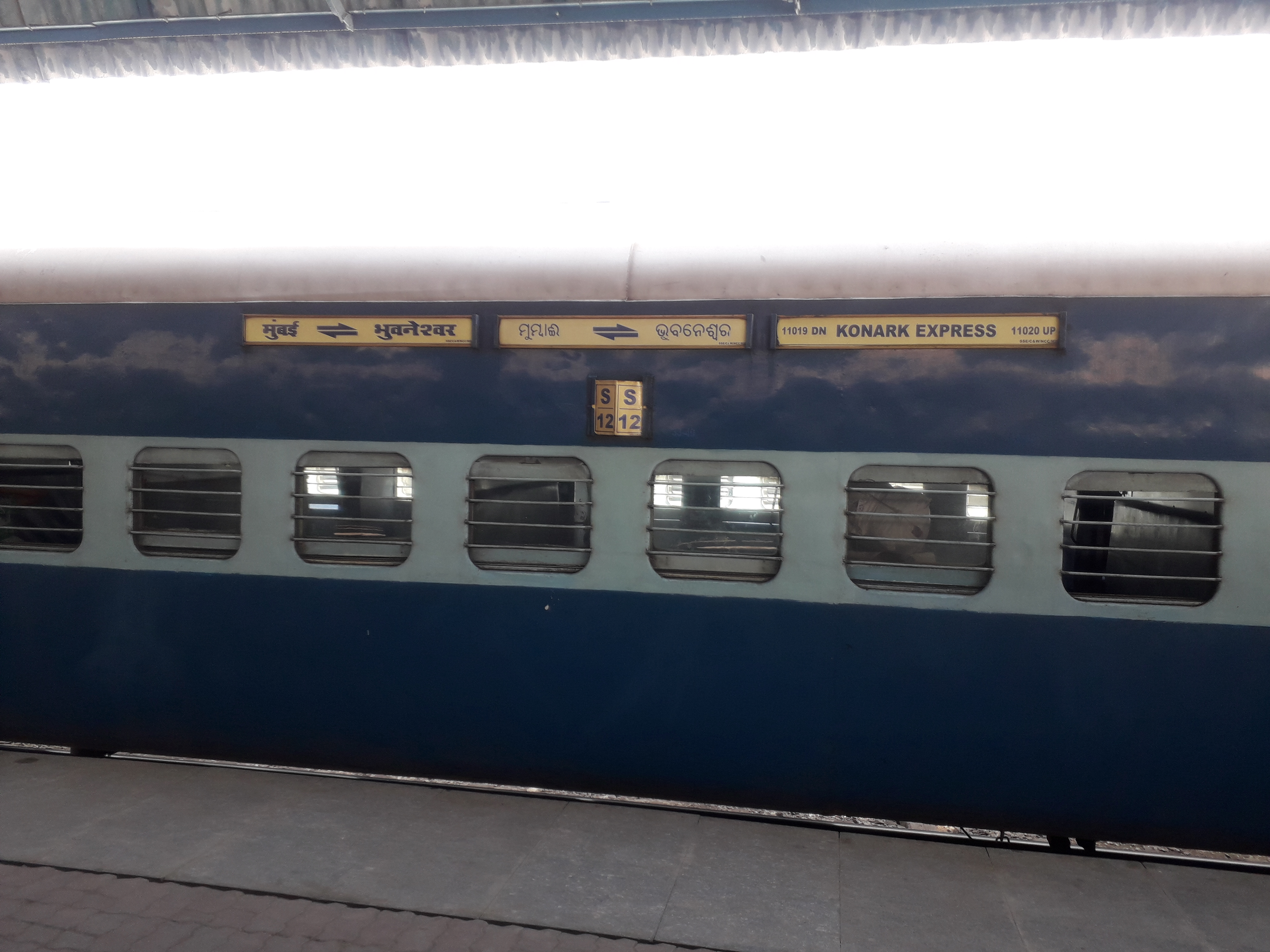
ICF coach

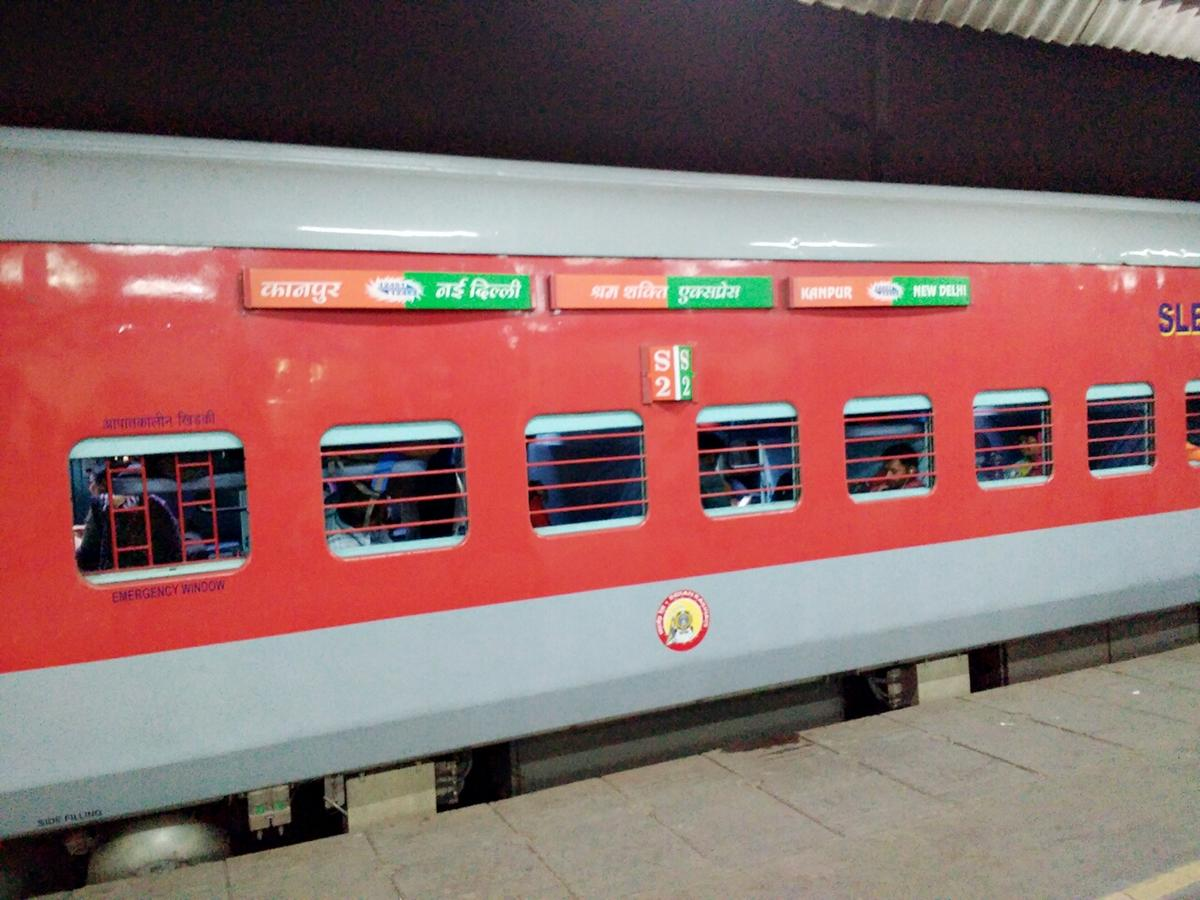
LHB coach

The early rail coaches were based on a prototype by a Swiss company and were termed as ICF coaches after Integral Coach Factory (ICF), the first coach manufacturing unit in India. These coaches, manufactured from 1955 to 2018, were largely in use till the early 2010s. From the late 1990s, the ICF coaches were replaced by safer and newer LHB coaches designed by Linke-Hofmann-Busch of Germany. In the late 2010s, Indian railways started upgrading the coaches of select trains from LHB to Tejas coaches with enhanced features and the introduction of trainsets with specialised coaches such as Vande Bharat. As of 31 March 2024, Indian Railways had 91,948 passenger coaches, including 65,016 conventional, 12,229 EMU and 1,681 DMU coaches. Coaches are manufactured by five manufacturing units of the Indian Railways and public sector companies BEML and BHEL. The coaching stock have unique five or six digit identifiers. Till 2018, the first two digits indicating the year of manufacture and the last three digits indicating the class. In 2018, the numbering system was changed with the first two digits indicating the year of manufacture and the last four digits indicating the sequence number.

==== Multiple units ====
In the 1960s, electric multiple units (EMU) were developed for short-haul and suburban rail transit. On regional short-distance routes, mainline electrical multiple unit (MEMU) and diesel electrical multiple unit (DEMU) trains are run. These train sets run in formation of 6, 9, 12 or 15 coaches and a three-car set is typified by a motor coaches and two passenger coaches. These train-sets are self-propelled with capability for faster acceleration or deceleration. In 2018, Indian Railways also rolled out semi-high speed self-propelled train sets with modified coaches for inter city trains.

==== Goods wagons ====
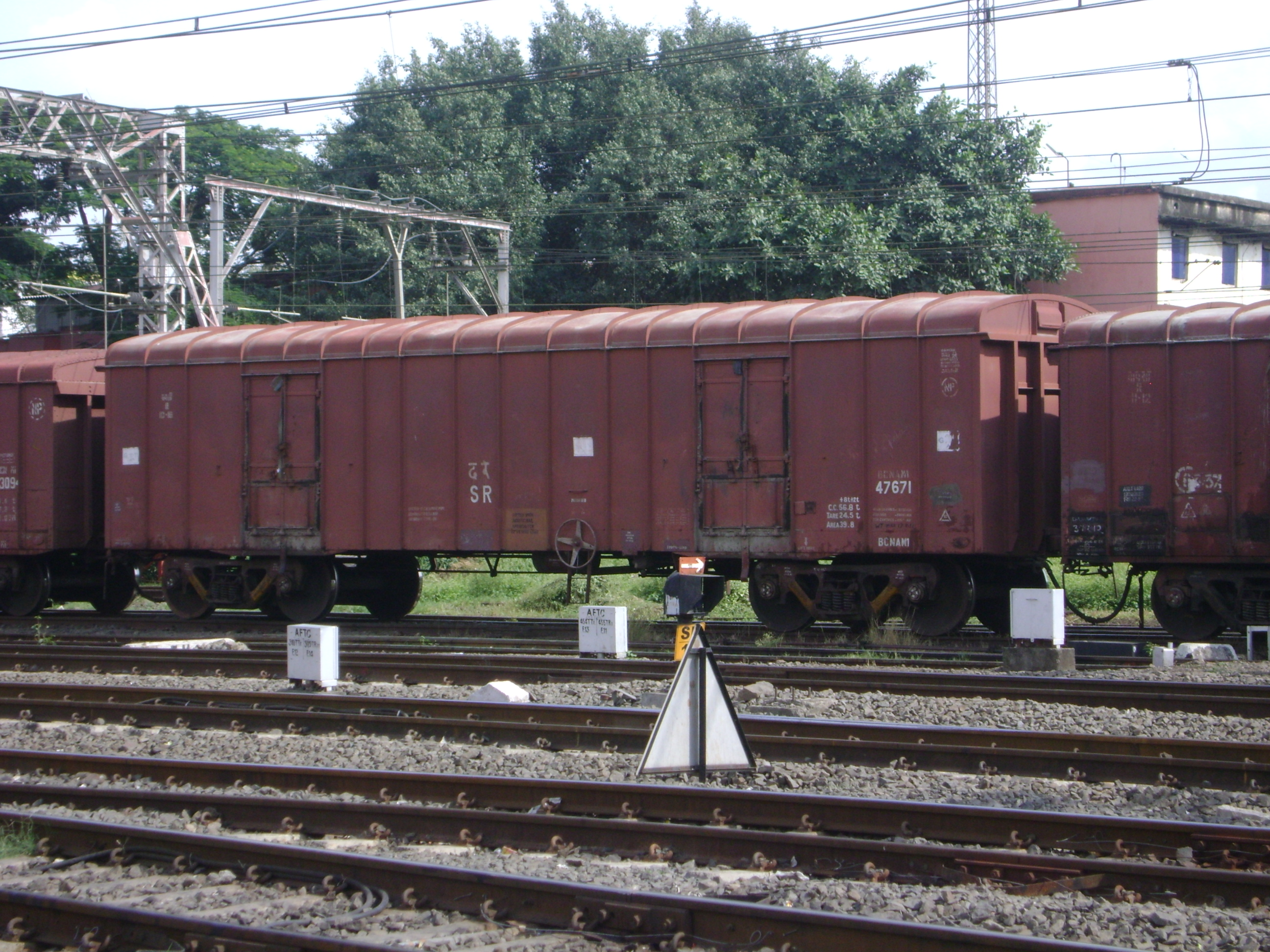
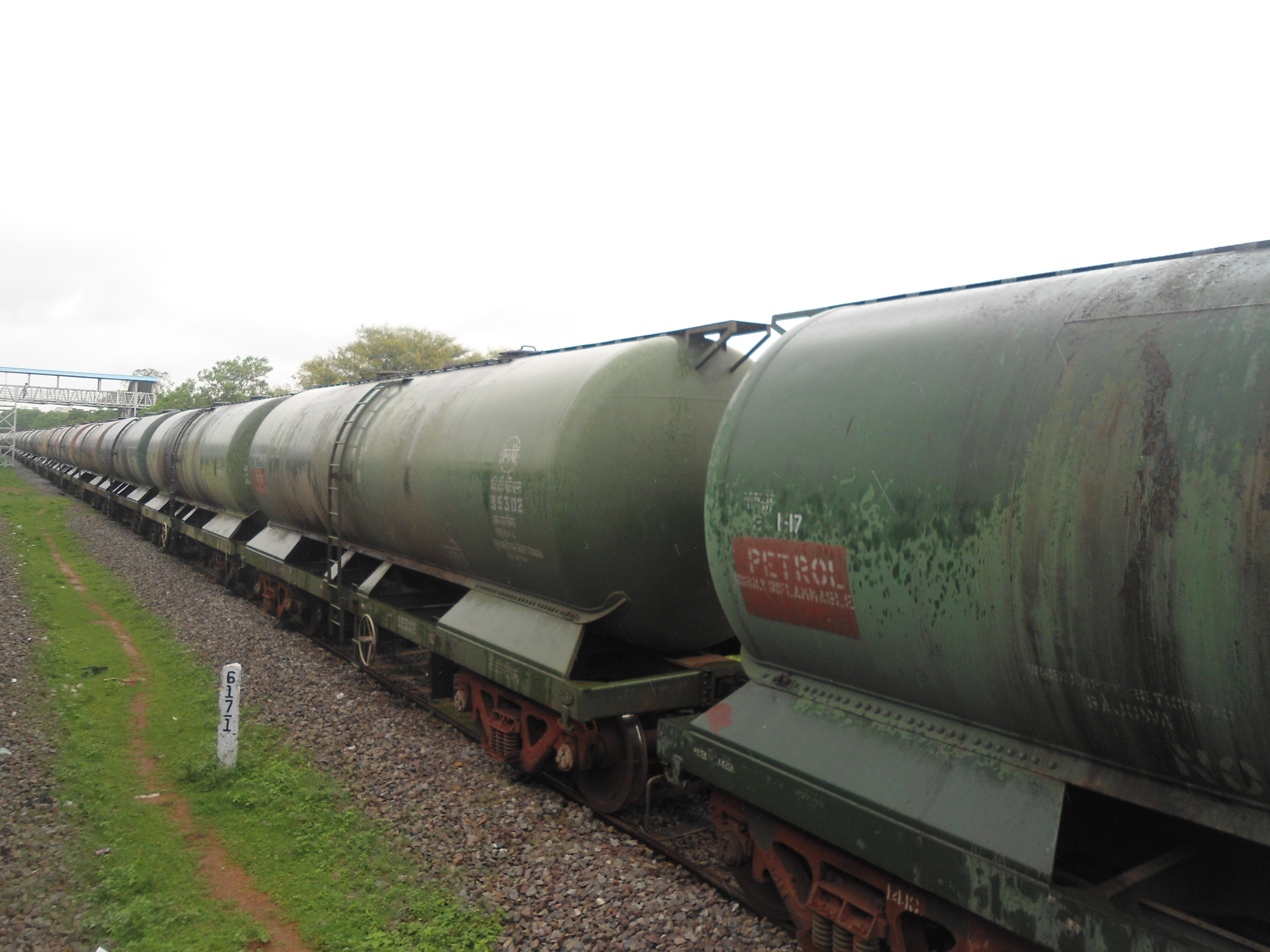
A covered goods wagon (left) and tanker

Indian Railways hauls various cargo and operates specialised rolling stock for cargo. There are 243 types of rolling stock used for cargo operations including covered wagons, boxcars, flat wagons, flatbeds, open wagons, hoppers, containers, automobile carriers, defense vehicle carriers and tankers. The freight cars can carry loads ranging from 10 to 80 tonnes per car depending on the configuration. A new wagon numbering system was adopted in Indian Railways in 2003. The requirement of wagons was previously exclusively met by Bharat Wagon and Engineering with the procurement and manufacturing done by various public and private sector companies in the 2020s. In 2025, Indian Railways announced the implementation of an artificial intelligence based technology aimed at detecting unlocked doors in freight wagons during transit.

==== Others ====
Apart from standard passenger classes, the Indian Railways has other specialized coach types used for dedicated functions. These include accident relief medical vans, brake vans, generator cars, inspection carriages, military cars, pantry car and parcel vans. These may be dedicated self-propelled units or attached to train-sets.

==== Manufacturing ====
Indian Railways operates various manufacturing units. Chittaranjan Locomotive Works (CLW), commissioned in 1950, was the first locomotive manufacturing unit in India. The first rail coach manufacturing unit, the Integral Coach Factory (ICF) was established at Madras in 1956. Banaras Locomotive Works (BLW), commissioned in 1961, is the second locomotive manufacturing unit operated by Indian Railways. BHEL, Patiala Locomotive Works, Diesel Locomotive Factory, Marhowrah and Electric Locomotive Factory, Madhepura also manufacture locomotives in India. Railway coaches are also manufactured at coach factories at Kapurthala, Raebareli, Sonipat and Latur. Indian Railways also operates three rail wheel manufacturing factories at Bangalore, Bela and Raebareli.

==== Maintenance ====
The locomotives are operated and maintained by 40 locomotive sheds. The repair and maintenance of the fleet of other rolling stock is carried out at 294 carriage & wagon repair units across various zones of IR.

=== Tracks ===
Comparison of gauges in India with the standard gauge

As of 31 March 2024, the Indian railway network spanned 69,181 km (42,987 mi) in route length. With 31,094 km (19,321 mi) of the lines having two or more tracks, total running track length was 109,748 km (68,194 mi), while total trackage (including sidings) was 135,207 km (84,014 mi). The network was built with a variety of gauges, including 1,676 mm (5 ft 6 in) broad gauge, 1,000 mm (3 ft 3 3/8 in) metre gauge and 762 mm (2 ft 6 in) and 610 mm (2 ft) narrow gauge; but a long-term effort, Project Unigauge, aims to convert most of these to broad gauge. As of 31 March 2024, 66,820 km (41,520 mi) or 96.59% of the network was broad-gauge, 1,159 km (720 mi) or 1.68% metre-gauge and 1,202 km (747 mi) or 1.74% narrow-gauge. The broad-gauge network is equipped with long-welded, high-tensile 52kg/60kg 90 UTS rails with prestressed concrete sleepers and elastic fastenings.

Track sections are rated for speeds ranging from 80 to 200 km/h (50 to 124 mph), though the maximum speed attained by passenger trains is 160 km/h (99 mph). As of 2025, 23,010 km (14,300 mi) (21.1%) of the tracks are capable of handling speeds of above 130 km/h (81 mph) and 59,800 km (37,200 mi) (56.6%) of the tracks are capable of handling speeds between 110–130 km/h (68–81 mph).

As of January 2026, over 80% of the network (84,244 km) has been upgraded to operate at speeds of up to 110 kmph.

==== Trunk routes ====
As of July 2020, there are seven major routes a total length of 11,295 km (7,018 mi) which have been classified as High-Density Network (HDN) routes or trunk routes. These routes are designed for a maximum operational speed limit of 160 km/h, and carry about 60% of the rail traffic. The trunk routes include Chennai–Howrah, Chennai–Mumbai, Delhi–Chennai, Delhi–Howrah, Howrah–Mumbai, Mumbai–Delhi and Delhi–Guwahati.

==== Electrification ====
The first electric train ran in Bombay in 1925 on DC traction. In 1928, DC traction was introduced in the suburbs of Bombay by the Bombay, Baroda and Central India Railway between Colaba and Borivali and between Madras beach and Tambaram by the Madras and Southern Mahratta Railway in 1931. In 1957, Indian Railways decided to adopt 25 kV AC as its standard. The first 25 kV AC EMUs operated in Calcutta in 1962 and Madras in 1968. Indian Railways uses 25 kV AC traction on all its electrified tracks. In 2017, Indian Railways announced a plan to electrify the country's entire broad gauge rail network by 2023, and would require 30 billion kWh of electricity on an annual basis. As of 31 July 2026, the Indian Railways has electrified 70,143 km (43,585 mi) (99.6%) of the total broad-gauge route length of 70,412 km (43,752 mi).

==== Cross-border ====
India shares land border with multiple countries and have rail-links with some of them. Bangladesh is connected to West Bengal with a construction of new rail link connecting Tripura with Akhaura. Two rail links to Nepal exist as of 2021, with a third under construction. There is an existing railink with Pakistan through Attari–Wagah border.

=== Signaling and communication ===
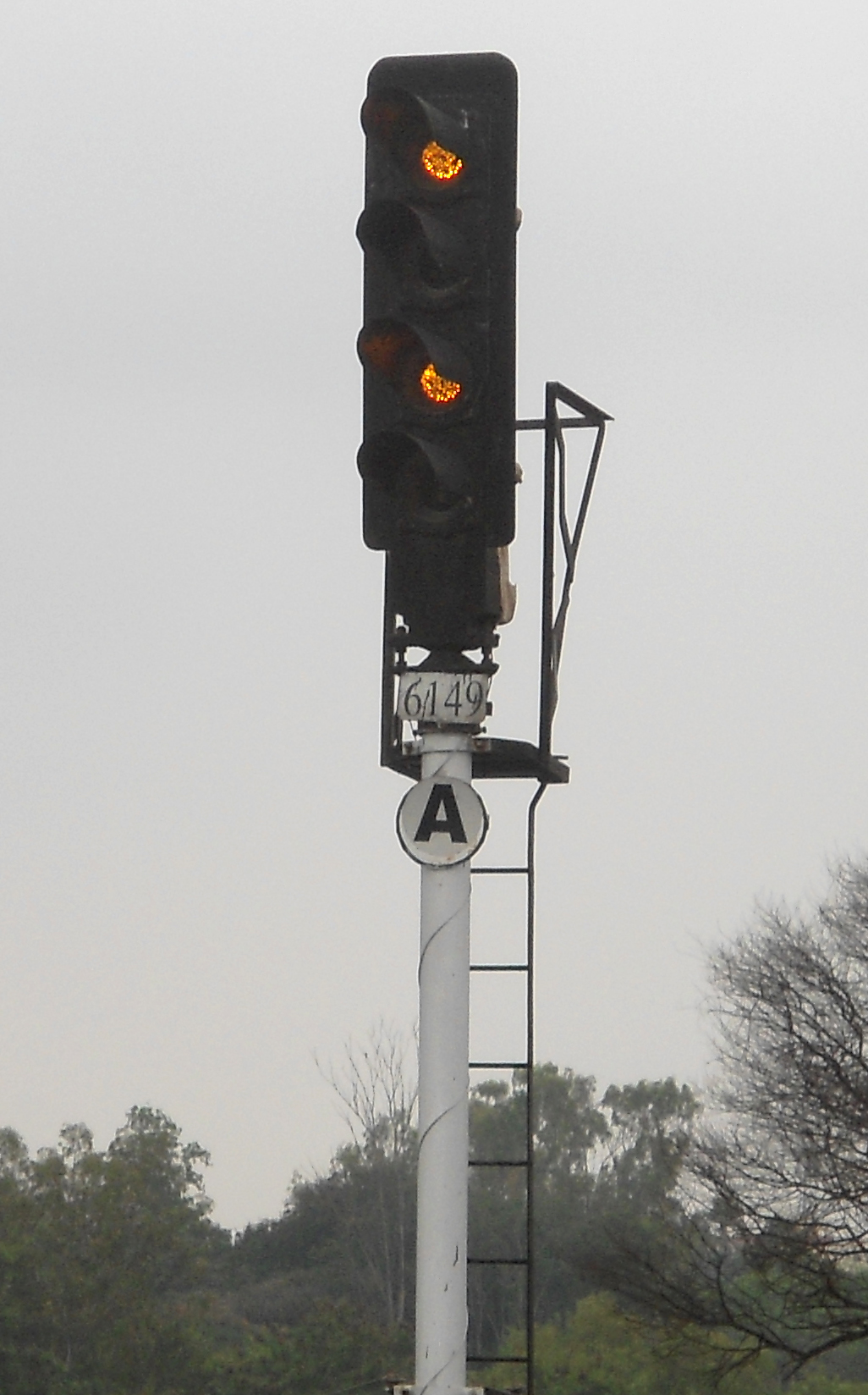
Indian Railways uses coloured signal lights similar to the one pictured

Indian Railways uses a range of signalling technologies and methods to manage its train operations based on traffic density and safety requirements. As of 28 February 2025, automatic block signalling is used on a total route length of 5,221 km (3,244 mi) for train operations – concentrated in high density routes, large cities and junctions. Remaining routes are based on absolute block signalling with trains manually controlled by signal men from the signal boxes typically located at stations. Few low density routes still use manual block signalling methods with communication on track clearance based on physical exchange of tokens. In a few sections, intermediate block signalling is provided to further enhance line capacity with minimal investment. As of 31 March 2024, 756 block sections have intermediate block signals. Indian Railways primarily uses coloured signal lights, which replaced the earlier semaphores and disc-based signalling. It uses two-aspect, three-aspect and four (or multiple) aspect color signalling across its network.

Signals at most stations are interlocked using panel interlocking, route-relay interlocking or electronic interlocking methods that eliminate scope for human signalling errors. Indian Railways uses track circuiting, and block proving axle counters for train detection. As of 31 March 2024, 6,637 stations have interlocked and multi-aspect signalling. Around 99% of key routes have track circuitry or block proving axle counters for automated train detection and Kavach automatic train protection system has been implemented in 1,465 km (910 mi) of tracks. The railways has about 66,179 km (41,122 mi) of optical fiber cable network used for train control, voice and data communication with 7,538 km (4,684 mi) of the route covered by GSM-R based Mobile Train Radio communication. In December 2017, Indian Railways announced that it will implement ETCS Level 2 system for signalling and control on key routes with an investment of ₹120 billion (US$1.3 billion).

=== Stations ===
As of 31 March 2024, Indian Railways manages and operates 7,461 stations. Prior to 2017, the stations were classified into seven categories based on their earnings. Since 2017, Indian Railways categorizes the stations by commercial importance into three different categories namely Non Suburban Group (NSG), Suburban Group (SG) and Halt Group (HG). These are further subdivided into subcategories based on their commercial importance (NSG 1–6, SG 1-3 and from HG 1–3). The commercial importance of a station is determined by taking into account its passenger footfall, earnings and strategic importance and these categories are used to determine the minimum essential amenities required by each station.

== Services ==
=== Passenger ===
==== Travel classes ====
Indian Railways offers various travel classes on its coaches. For the purpose of identification in passenger trains, coaches in a train-set are assigned an alpha-numeric code. The first letter identifies the coach class and the second letter identifies the coach number. The berths and seats are numbered by an alphanumeric code with the letter(s) identifying the berth/seat type and numbers identifying the position.

Travel classes
Class	Code	Description	Image
First AC	H	It is the most luxurious and expensive class in most express trains. They have separate air-conditioned compartments with private lockable doors, bedding, dedicated attendants and meals served at seat.	
First Class	F	First class is similar to first AC coaches with a combination of cabins and berths but are non air-conditioned and do not have all the facilities of first AC coaches. They were slated to be phased out of normal express trains starting in the 2000s and the last coach being de-commissioned in 2015. The First class is still in use in the Unreserved type Suburban trains operated in the Mumbai, Chennai, Delhi, Kolkata, Pune and Hyderabad areas as well as in the Unreserved MEMU passenger/Express trains in overall Indian railways network. Additionally these services are available still as a reservation category in the toy trains where the coaches consist of seats similar to chair cars.	
Executive Anubhuti	EA/K	Executive Anubhuti is the premium class of air-conditioned chair car equipped with retractable, large cushioned seats in 2x2 configuration. The class is equipped with an entertainment system, large luggage compartments, passenger information system, dedicated reading lights, power sockets and call buttons, modular bio toilets with automated taps. Meals often provided as a part of the journey ticket. The class is available only in select trains.	
AC Executive Class	E	AC Executive Class is often the top most class of air-conditioned chair car in express trains. It is equipped with large retractable seats in 2x2 configuration. The class is equipped with dedicated reading lights and power sockets, modular bio toilets with automated taps. Meals are often provided as a part of the journey ticket. In Vande Bharat Express trains, the class is equipped with more features including rotating seats, CCTVs, passenger information system, larger toilets, USB ports and automated doors.	
Executive Vistadome	EV	AC Tourist cars have vistadome coaches with glass roofs and extra wide windows. The interiors are similar to AC chair car coaches. Select trains operating mostly on tourist circuits are equipped with such coaches. Indian Railways plans to introduce these coaches in all mountain railways.	
Second AC or AC 2-tier	A	Second AC or AC 2-tier is an air-conditioned sleeping car with wide sealed windows. There are four berths arranged in two-tiers facing each other in a single bay with two-tiered berths arranged on the sides lengthwise across the corridor. Individual berths are equipped with curtains, simple bedding, reading lights and charging sockets. Food is available on order or as a part of the ticket depending on the train.	
Third AC or AC 3-tier	B	Third AC or AC 3-tier is an air-conditioned sleeping car. There are six berths arranged in three-tiers facing each other in a single bay with foldable middle berths and two-tiered berths arranged on the sides lengthwise across the corridor. There are common charging sockets and lights in each compartment with simple bedding provided. Food is available on order or as a part of the ticket depending on the train with the same menu shared with AC 2-tier.	
AC 3-tier economy	G/M	AC 3-tier economy coaches are air-conditioned sleeping cars similar to AC 3-tier. Compared to 3-tier coaches, they have an extra middle berth along the aisle. The coaches were first introduced in Garib Rath trains and only a few trains operate with such coaches. Bedding is available for rent and the coaches have facilities like charging sockets and lights similar to AC 3-tier coaches. New AC 3-tier economy coaches introduced in 2021 have similar berth arrangement as AC 3-tier but accommodates 83 berths per coach and other improved facilities.	
AC Chair Car	C	AC chair car are air-conditioned coaches equipped with retractable seats in 3x2 configuration. The class has cushioned seats with tray tables and are equipped with LED reading lights, power sockets along the window side. Meals are provided as a part of the journey ticket in select trains. In Vande Bharat Express trains, the class is equipped with more features including passenger information system, CCTVs, larger toilets and automated doors.	
Sleeper	S	Sleeper class is the most common sleeping car coach in Indian Railways. There are six berths arranged in three-tiers facing each other in a single bay with foldable middle berths and two-tiered berths arranged on the sides lengthwise across the corridor. The coaches are not air-conditioned and have open-able windows. There are common charging sockets, ceiling mounted fans and lights in each compartment. Food is available on order or can be purchased from vendors.	
Second sitting	D/J	Second sitting is the most common chair car coach and the cheapest in the Indian Railways. It is common in most day-time running trains with six seats arranged in 3x3 configuration. The seats may face each other or towards the same side. The coaches are not air-conditioned and have open-able windows. There are common charging sockets, ceiling mounted fans and lights in each compartment. Food is available on order or can be purchased from vendors.	
Unreserved or General	UR/GS	Unreserved or general coaches are second seating coaches which are not available for reservation and seats are taken on available basis. One or more of these coaches are attached to express trains while dedicated passenger trains might also have all unreserved coaches. Tickets are valid on any train on a route only for within 24 hours of purchase.	

Saloon coaches available for chartering are equipped with a bedroom and kitchen and can be attached to normal trains.

==== Passenger trains ====
Express trains of India

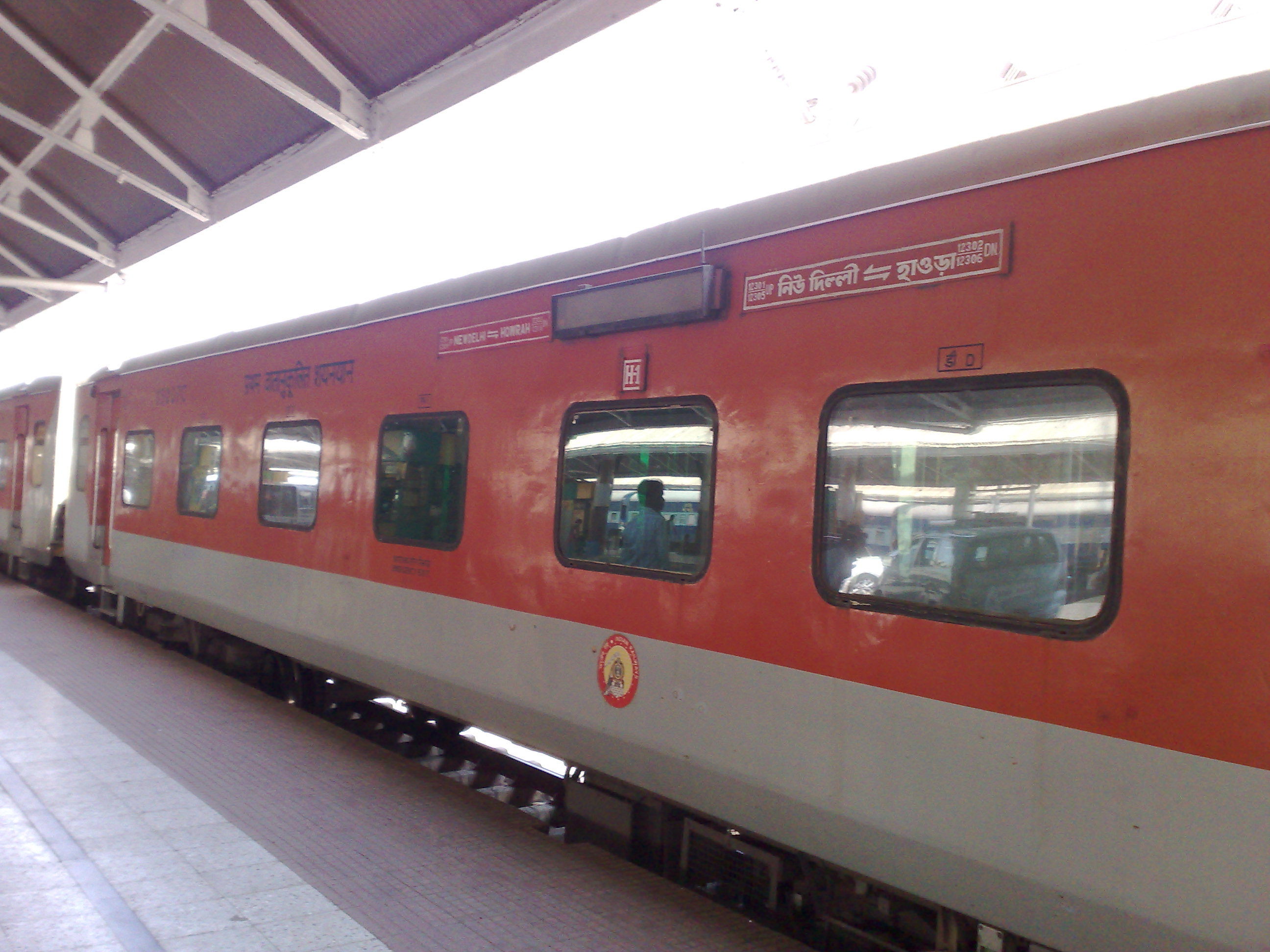
Rajdhani Express

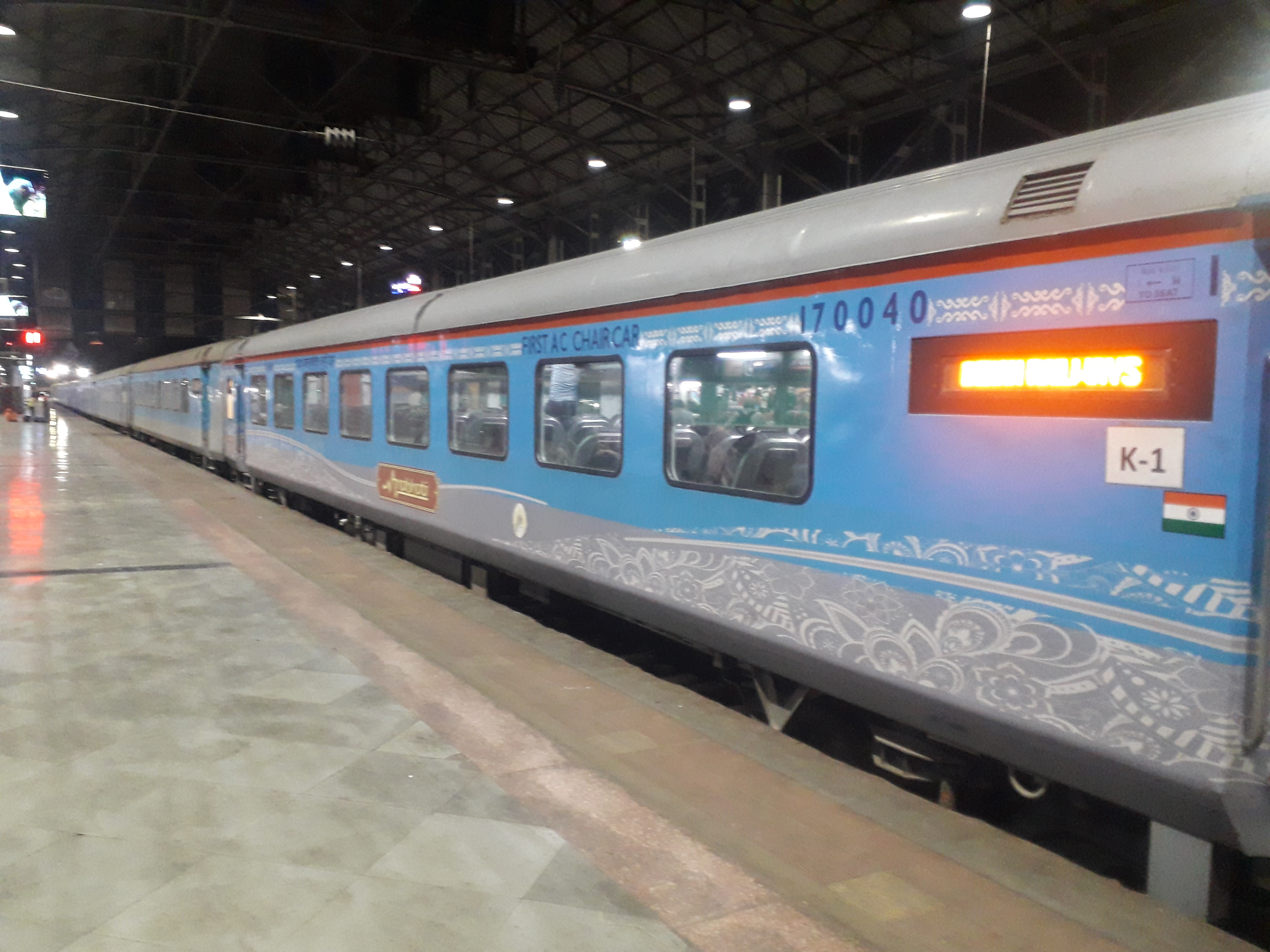
Shatabdi Express

An Indian train waiting at a railway crossing amid traffic in Raxaul, Bihar, India, in 2018

Indian Railways operates various classes of passenger and express trains. The trains are classified basis average speed and facilities with express trains having fewer halts, priority on rail network and faster average speed. The trains are identified by five digit numbers with train-pairs traveling in opposite directions usually labelled with consecutive numbers. Express trains often have specific unique names for easy identification. In 2018–19, Indian Railways operated 13,523 passenger trains on average daily and carried 8.44 billion passengers. India Railways operates various categories of express trains including Rajdhani Express, Shatabdi Express, Garib Rath Express, Double Decker Express, Tejas Express, Gatimaan Express, Humsafar Express, Duronto Express, Yuva Express, Uday Express, Jan Shatabdi Express, Sampark Kranti Express, Vivek Express, Rajya Rani Express, Mahamana Express, Antyodaya Express, Jan Sadharan Express, Suvidha Express and Intercity Express.

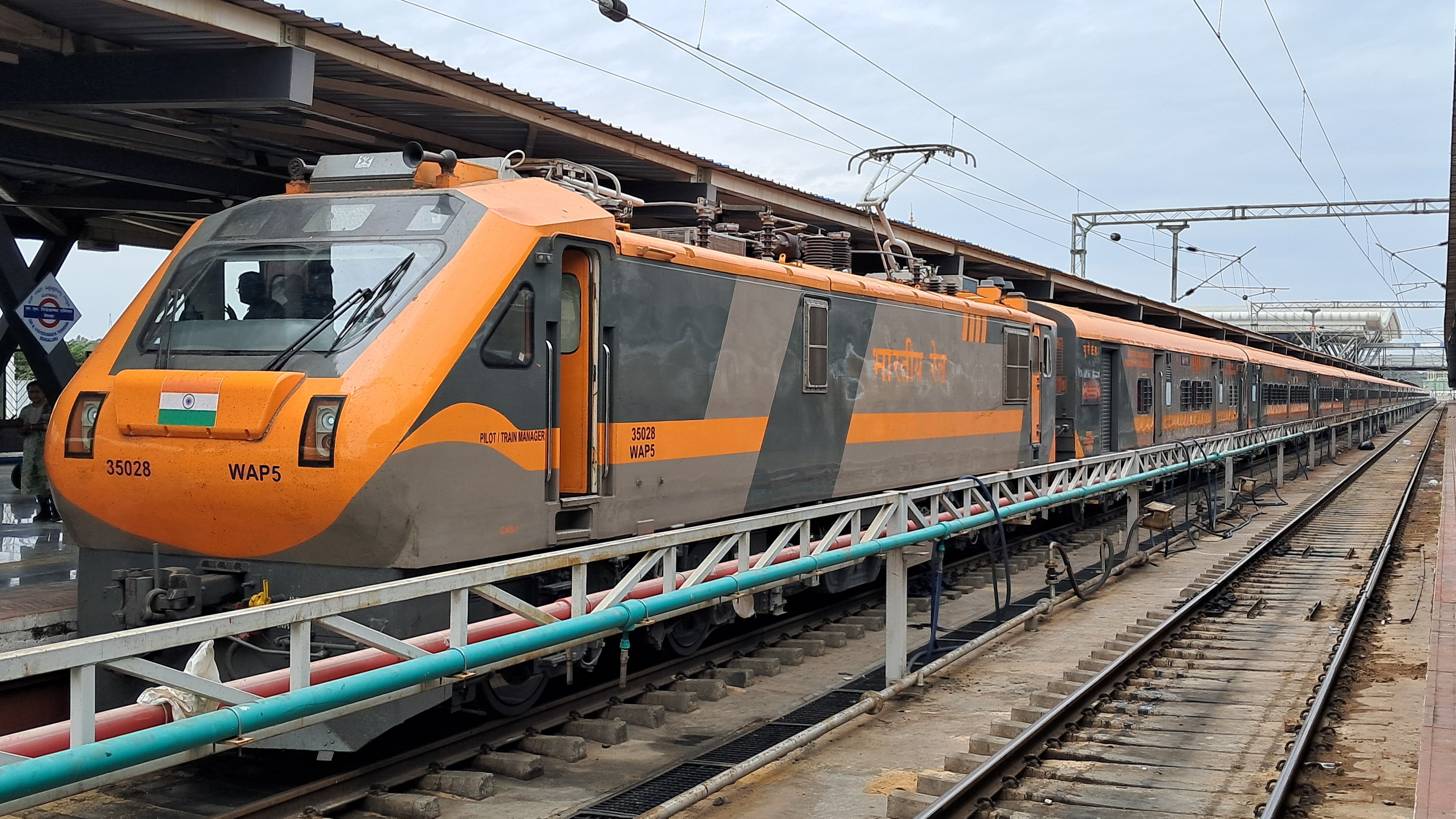
Amrit Bharat semi-high speed rail

==== High-speed rail ====
Rajdhani Express introduced in 1969 were the first trains to reach speeds of up to 120 km/h (75 mph). Shatabdi Express introduced in 1988, are capable of running at a maximum speed of 150 km/h (93 mph). In 2019, Vande Bharat Express was launched with self-propelled EMU train-sets capable of reaching maximum speed of 180 km/h (110 mph) with operational speeds restricted to 130–160 km/h (81–99 mph). A non-air-conditioned semi-high speed train-set hauled by two modified WAP-5 locomotives was launched as Amrit Bharat Express. A high-speed rail line is under construction between Mumbai and Ahmedabad which will become the first true high-speed rail line when completed in 2026.

==== Mountain railways ====
Mountain Railways of India

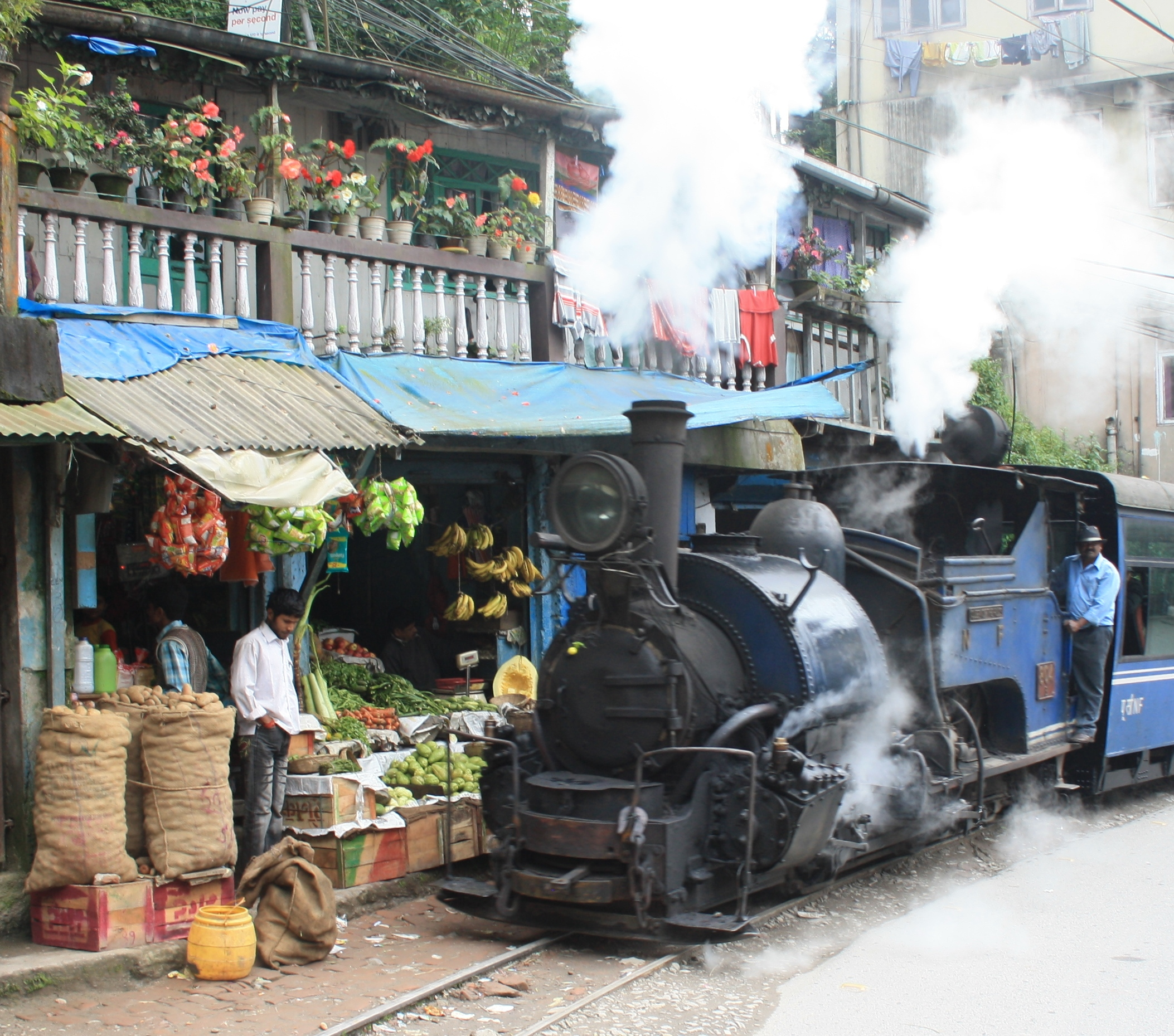
Darjeeling

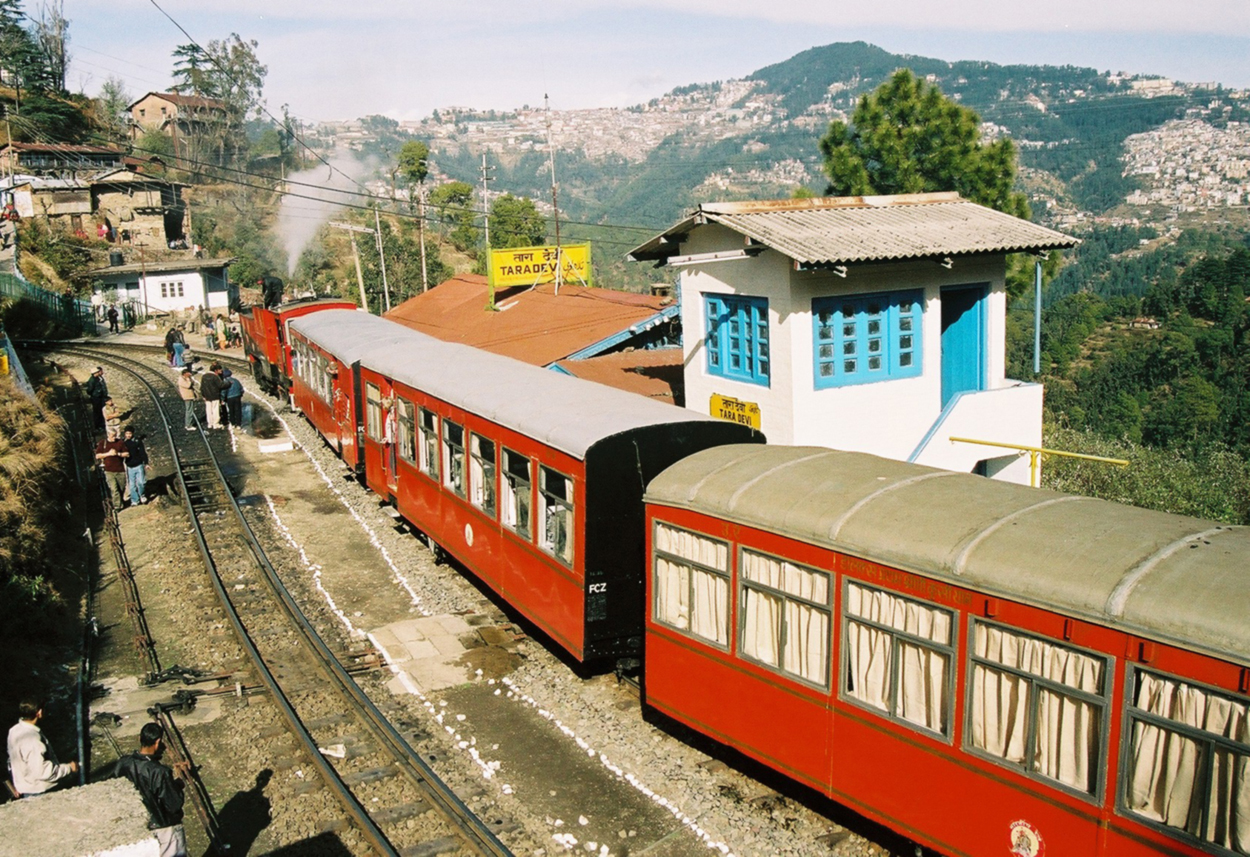
Kalka-Shimla

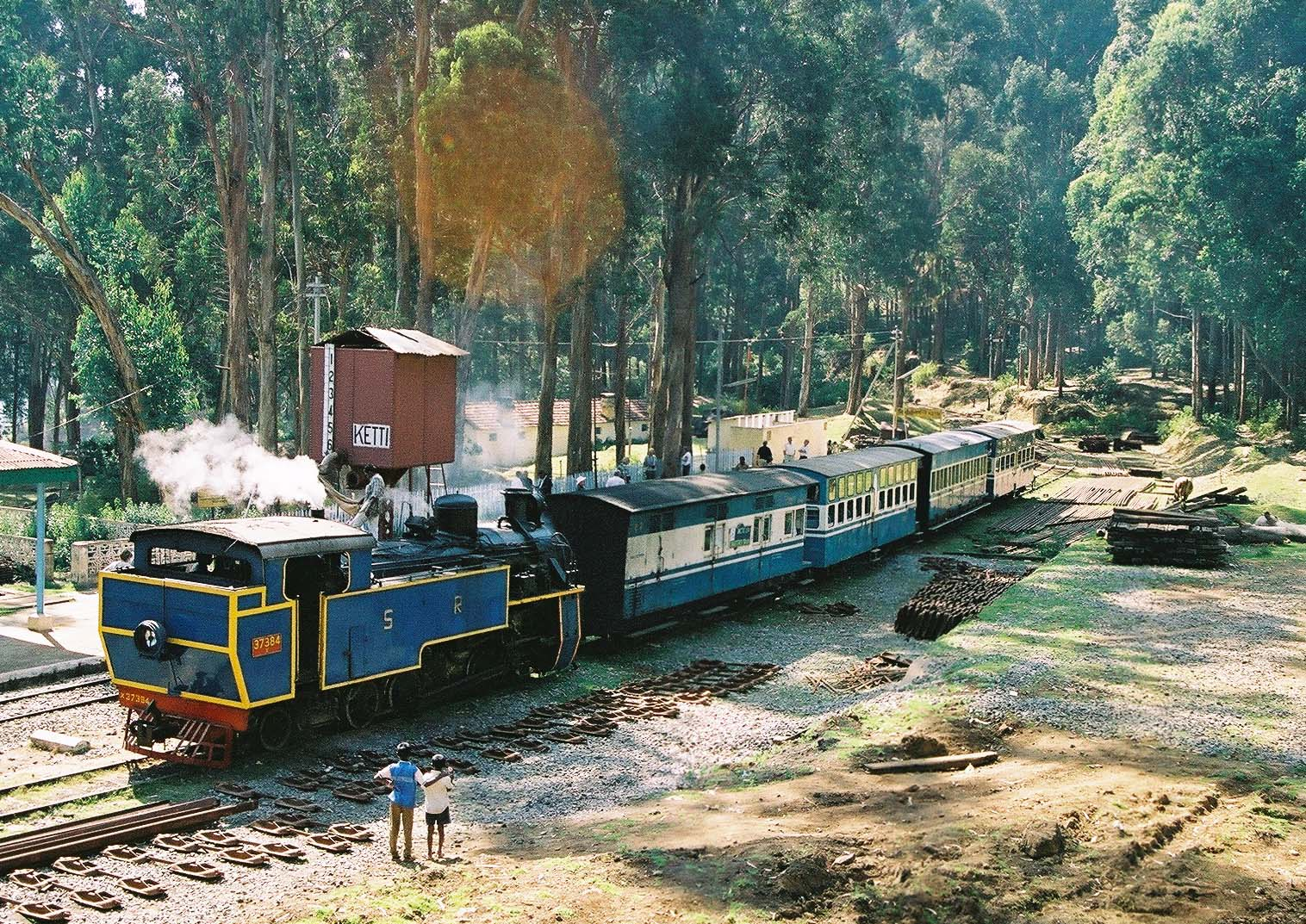
Nilgiri

Mountain Railways of India refer to three rail lines operated by Indian Railways in hilly terrain. Darjeeling Himalayan Railway, a 610 mm (2 ft) narrow-gauge railway in the Lesser Himalayas of West Bengal was opened in 1881. The mountain railways were designated as World Heritage Sites in 1999. The Kalka-Shimla Railway, a 762 mm (2 ft 6 in) narrow-gauge railway in the Siwalik Hills of Himachal Pradesh started operating in 1903. The Nilgiri Mountain Railway, a 1,000 mm (3 ft 3 3/8 in) metre gauge rack railway in the Nilgiri Hills of Tamil Nadu was opened in 1908 and is the only operational rack railway in India. These railways operate with its own dedicated fleet of locomotives and coaches.

==== Suburban and metro ====
Urban Rail systems

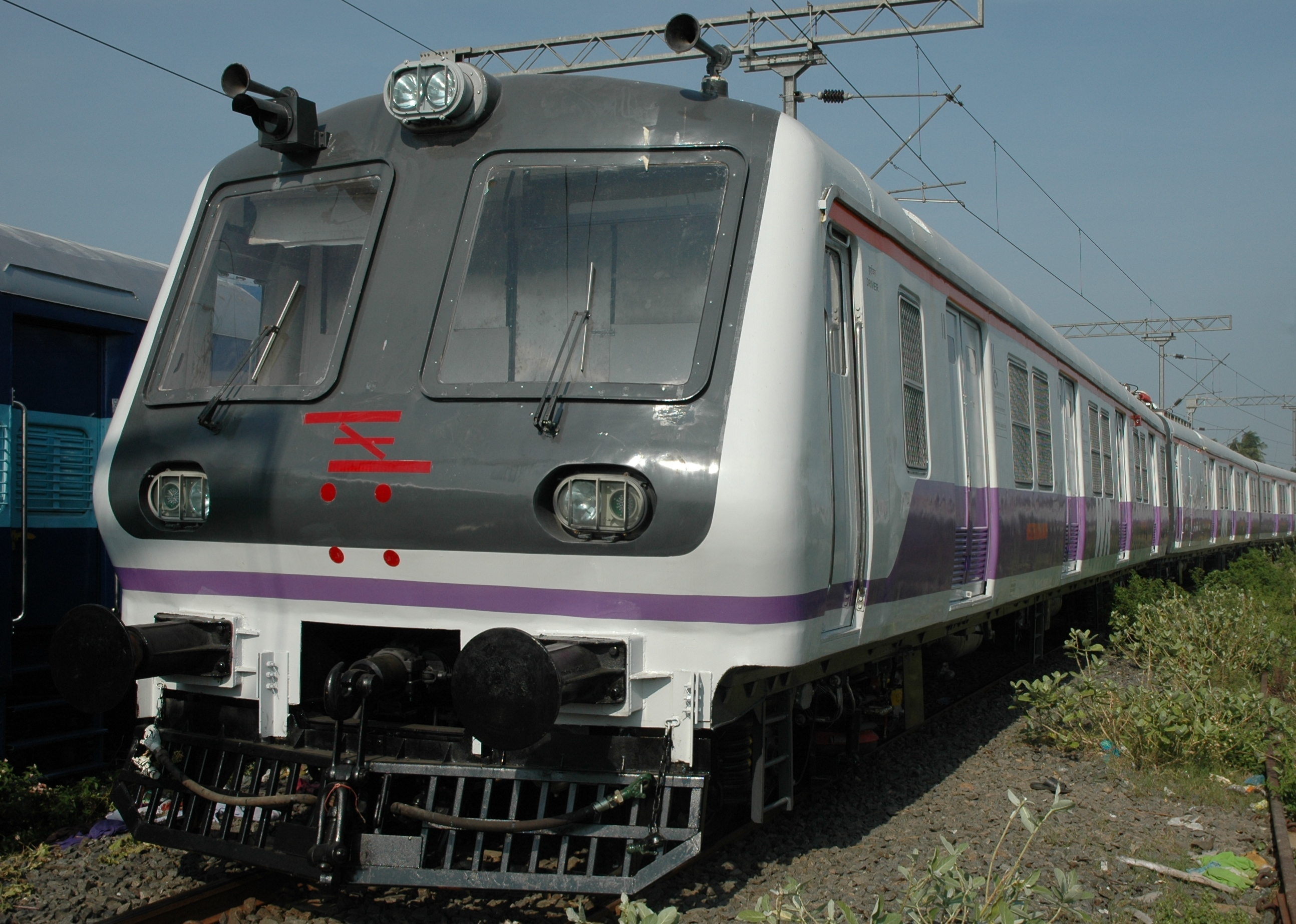
Mumbai Suburban

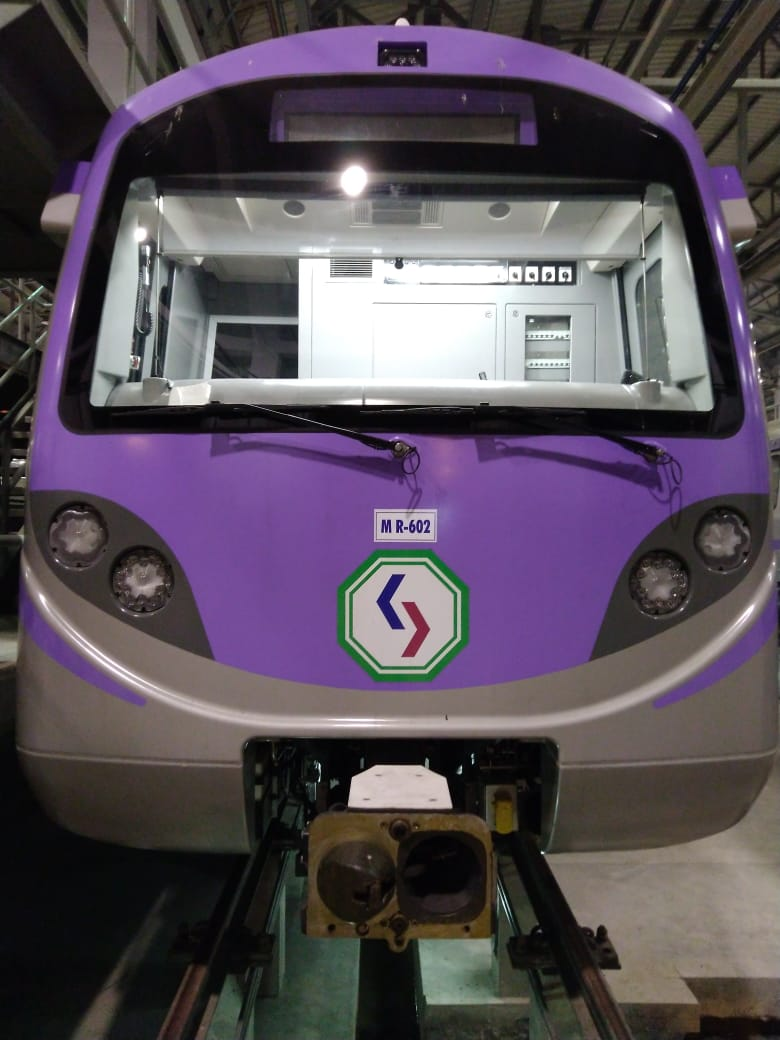
Kolkata Metro

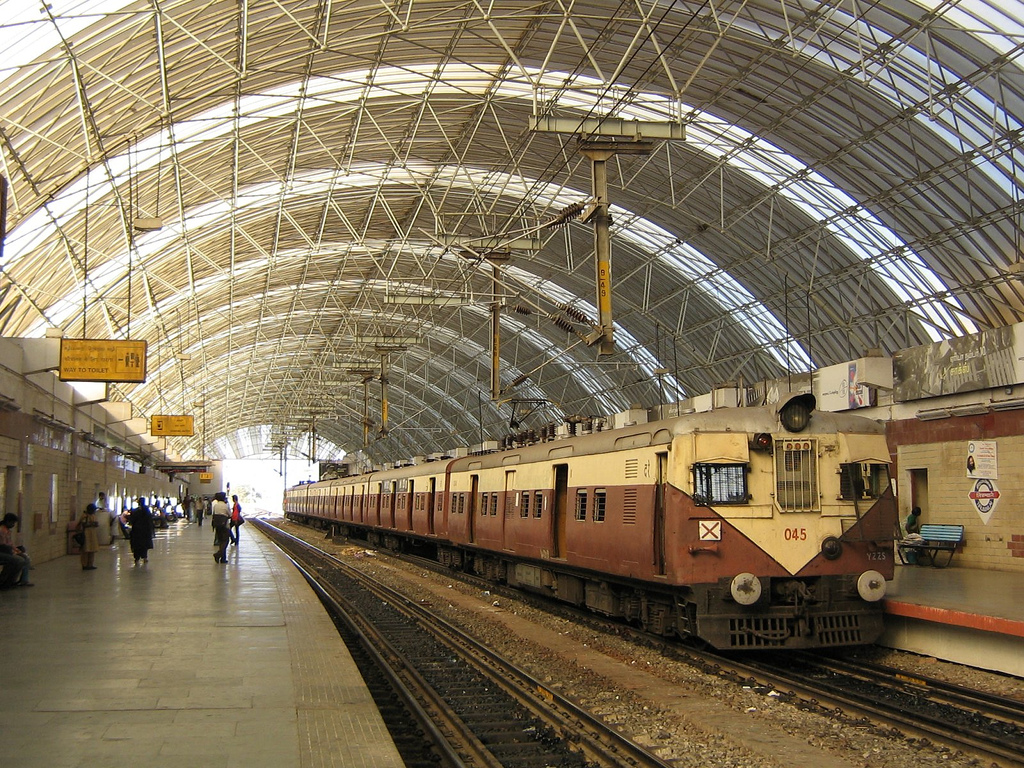
Chennai MRTS

The first suburban electric trains were introduced in Bombay in 1925. Chennai suburban lines started operating in 1931 and Kolkata in 1957. Later, AC traction was adopted for suburban lines and are currently operated by Multiple Units (MUs) of various configurations. In 1984, Kolkata Metro, the first metro system and the only system operated by Indian Railways was commissioned. Opened in November 1995, Chennai MRTS became the first operational elevated railway line in India. Indian Railways operates suburban railway systems across the cities of Mumbai (suburban), Chennai (suburban and MRTS), Kolkata (suburban and metro), Pune (suburban) and Secunderabad (MMTS) covering six railway zones.

==== Tourism ====
Indian Railways offers tour packages through IRCTC. It operates tourist trains and coach services on popular tourist circuits in different regions of the country. It operates luxury tourist trains such as Maharajas' Express, Palace on Wheels, Golden Chariot and Deccan Odyssey, deluxe tourist trains such as Mahaparinirvan Express. It also operates heritage and exhibition trains on special circumstances.

==== Ticketing and fares ====
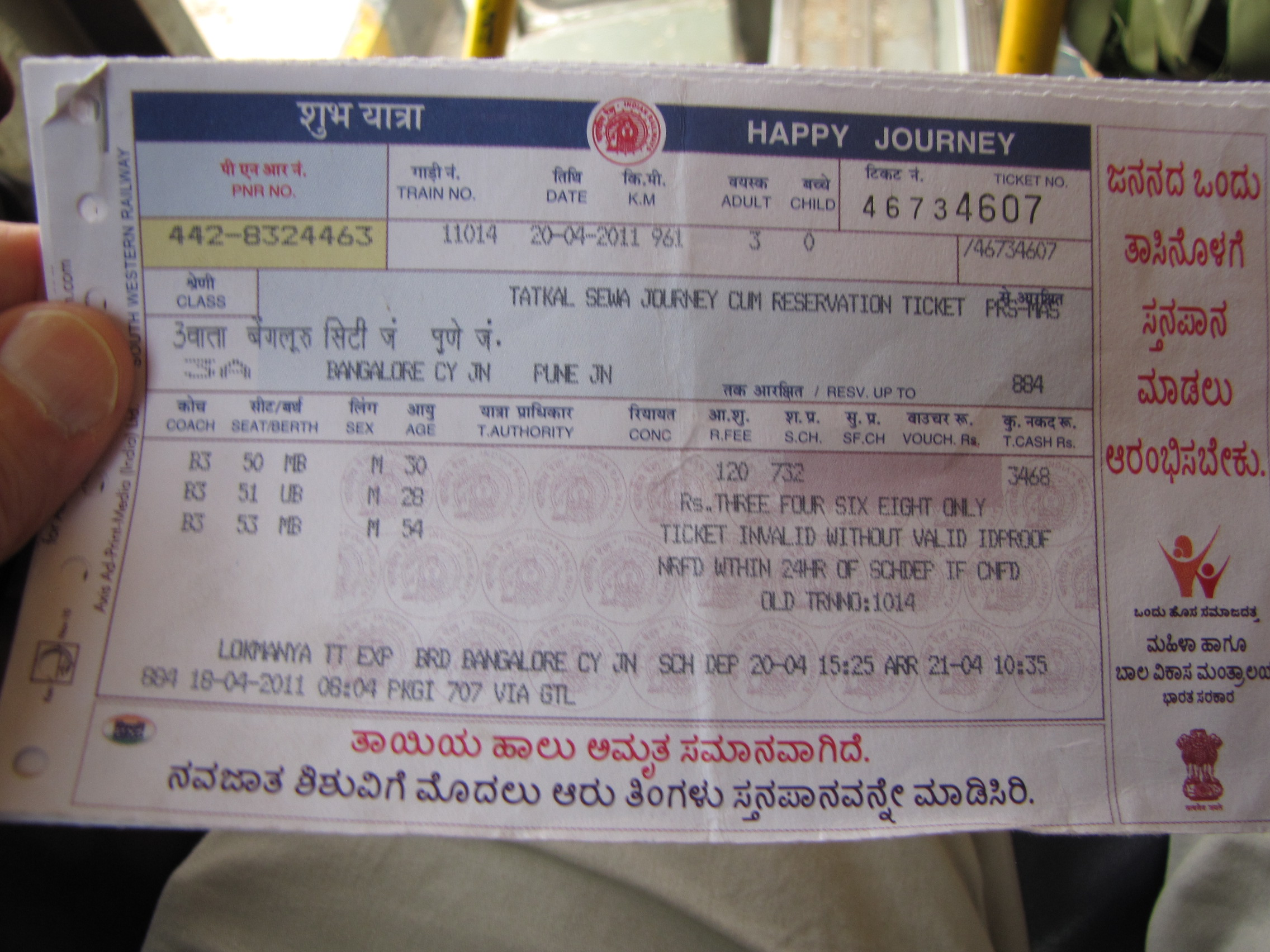
A standard printed Indian Railways ticket

In 1986, computerized ticketing and reservations were introduced before which ticketing was done manually. Self-printing ticket machines (SPTM) were introduced in 1988. Centralized computer reservation system was deployed in September 1996. The ticketing network at stations is computerized with the exception of few stations. The Indian Railways website went online in February 2000 and online ticketing was introduced on 3 August 2002 through IRCTC. Indian Railways now provides multiple channels for passengers to book tickets through website, smartphone apps, SMS, rail reservation counters at train stations, or through private ticket booking counters. Reserved tickets may be booked up to 60 days in advance and confirmed reservation tickets will show the passenger and fare details along with berth or seat number(s) allocated to them on the ticket.

In case of no confirmed reservation, a wait-list number is assigned and wait-listed tickets get confirmed if there are cancellations of already reserved tickets. Reservation against cancellation tickets is an intermediate category between the waiting and confirmed lists in sleeper classes which allows a ticket holder to board the train and share a berth. Reserved tickets can be booked by passengers who want to travel at short notice at higher fares through the Tatkal train ticket, where no refund is applicable on cancellation. A valid proof for the purchase of ticket along with photo identification is required to board the train. Unreserved tickets for short distance or unplanned travels may be purchased at stations or through UTS mobile app at any time before departure. Holders of such tickets may only board the general or unreserved coaches. Suburban networks also issue unreserved tickets valid for a limited time or season passes with unlimited travel between two stops for a period of time.

India has some of the lowest train fares in the world, and lower class passenger fares are subsidised. Discounted fares are applicable for railway employees, senior citizens (over age 60), the disabled, students, athletes, patients and those taking competitive examinations. Seats of lower class of accommodation are reserved for women or senior citizens in some trains.

=== Freight ===
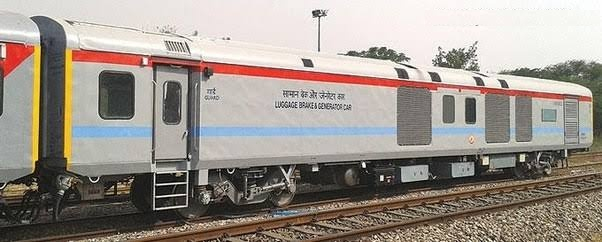
A hybrid coach with provision to carry small cargo and mail, often attached to passenger trains

The first rail operational in Madras in 1837 was used for ferrying granite. The first dedicated commercial freight rail was operated between Bombay and Ahmedabad in 1966. Indian Railways ferries various commodities and cargo to cater to various industrial, consumer, and agricultural segments. Apart from dedicated freight trains, parcels, mail and small cargo are carried on specialized carriages attached to passenger trains. In 2023–24, Indian Railways operated 11,724 freight trains on average daily and transported 1588.06 million tonnes of freight.

Indian Railways has historically subsidized the passenger segment with income from the freight business and prioritized passenger trains on the network. Hence, freight services were unable to complete other modes of transport on both cost and speed of delivery, leading to continuous erosion of market share till the early 2000s. To counter this, Indian Railways established the Dedicated Freight Corridor Corporation of India in 2006 to construct dedicated freight corridors to reduce congestion, increase speed and reliability and proposed upgradation of existing goods sheds, attracting private capital to build multi-commodity multi-modal logistics terminals, changing container sizes, operating time-tabled freight trains and tweaking with the freight pricing/product mix. End-to-end integrated transport solutions such as roll-on, roll-off (RORO) service, a road-rail system pioneered by Konkan Railway in 1999 to carry trucks on flatbed trailers is extended to other routes.

== Accidents and incidents ==
As per the Ministry of Railways, there have been more than 38,500 railway accidents from 1961 to 2019. In 2019-20, the Indian Railways reported zero passenger deaths due to accidents for the first time in its history. At least 313 people died in 40 train accidents in 2023-24 and 748 people have died in 638 train accidents in the previous ten years.

Accidents of Indian Railways
Span	Accidents						Train kms (million)	Accidents per million kms
Span	Collisions	Derailments	Level crossing	Fire	Others	Total	Train kms (million)	Accidents per million kms
1961–1970	834	10,664	1,394	1,037	0	13,929	4,339	3.21
1971–1980	588	6,763	1,120	185	0	8,665	4,810	1.80
1981–1990	475	6,242	677	176	0	7,570	5,598	1.35
1991–2000	340	3,583	632	77	0	4,642	6,559	0.70
2001–2010	135	1,680	803	93	52	2,763	8,333	0.33
2011–2019	43	567	352	54	16	1,023	10,134	0.10

== See also ==
- List of railway companies in India
- Rail transport in India
- Future of rail transport in India
