= Nabinagar Super Thermal Power Project =

Thermal power plant in Bihar, India

Nabinagar Power Generating Company
- Location of the Nabinagar Power Generating Company
- Country: India
- Location: Ankorha, Aurangabad district, Bihar
- Coordinates: 24.776°N 84.158°E
- Status: Operational
- Construction began: 2011
- Commission date: under construction
- Owner: NTPC
- Operator: Nabinagar Power Generating Company

Thermal power station
- Primary fuel: Coal

Power generation
- Units operational: 3 Unit 1980 MW is operational
- Make and model: BHEL and Alstom
- Nameplate capacity: 1,980 MW upcoming

Nabinagar Super Thermal Power Project is a coal-based thermal power plant located at Sivanpur village in Ankorha in Nabinagar taluk in Aurangabad district, Bihar. It was conceptualised in 1989 by the then Chief Minister of Bihar Satyendra Narayan Sinha who sent the proposal to set up a NTPC's super thermal power project at Nabinagar in Bihar's Aurangabad district to then Prime Minister of India Rajiv Gandhi; but the project went into limbo as the following state governments failed to follow it. In 2007, Manmohan Singh's government finally put a stamp of approval on it.

The power plant is owned by the Nabinagar Power Generating Company- initially a 50:50 joint venture between NTPC Limited and Bihar State Power Holding Company Limited. The Nabinagar plant will have capacity of 4380 MW( 660 MW × 6). The project's generation capacity initially was to be 3960 MW but in 2016, the production capacity was increased to 4380 MW. Nabinagar Super Thermal Power Project will be third largest power project in India, after 4700 MW Vindhyachal Thermal Power Station (Singrauli) and maharashtra belar.

This Super Thermal Power Project is spread over 2970 acres, which includes 150 acres of land for the township and 63 acres of land for construction of rail corridor. On 17 April 2018, Bihar state cabinet, headed by chief minister Nitish Kumar, gave its nod to handing over of Nabinagar Power Generating Company to National Thermal Power Corporation. On 15 May 2018, Bihar Government signed a memorandum of understanding (MoU) to hand over the thermal plant to National Thermal Power Corporation for a 33-year lease. For the Nabinagar plant's Bihar would get 78% of the electricity generated from the plant, while UP would get 11%, jharkhand 3% and Sikkim 1%.

== Capacity ==
The planned capacity of the power plant in 1980 MW (3×660 MW). Unit-1 with capacity to generate 660 MW, is scheduled to be commissioned in Dec'18.

Stage	Unit Number	Capacity (MW)	Date of Commissioning	Status
1st	1	660	Sep 6, 2019	Running
1st	2	660	July 30, 2021	Running
1st	3	660	June 1, 2022	Running
2nd	4	800	TBD	Under Construction
2nd	5	800	TBD	Under Construction
2nd	6	800	TBD	Under Construction

== Future expansion ==
There is a plan to add three units of 800 MW each at the site in future.

== See also ==
- Ultra Mega Power Projects
- Bihar State Power Holding Company Limited
- Nabinagar Thermal Power Project
