= Nabinagar Thermal Power Project =

Nabinagar Thermal Power Station
- Location of the Nabinagar (4X250MW) Thermal Power Station
- Country: India
- Location: Aurangabad district, Bihar
- Coordinates: 24.70°N 84.08°E
- Status: Operational
- Construction began: 2012
- Commission date: 3 out of 4 units commissioned
- Owners: Indian Railways, Ministry of Railways, Government of India
- Operator: NTPC Limited

Thermal power station
- Primary fuel: Coal

Power generation
- Units operational: under construction
- Make and model: BHEL
- Nameplate capacity: 1,000 MW

The Nabinagar Thermal Power Station Project (NTPS) of Bhartiya Rail Bijlee Company Limited is a wholly owned subsidiary of the Indian Railways, Ministry of Railways, Government of India. It installs a 4X 250 MW thermal power plant at Nabinagar in Aurangabad district, Bihar, India. Nearly 90 per cent of the electricity generated from the plant is supplied to the railways to meet nationwide requirements and remaining 10 per cent is given to Bihar.

In 1989, the Chief Minister of Bihar and veteran leader Satyendra Narain Singh conceived the proposal to set up a NTPC's super thermal power project at Nabinagar in Bihar's Aurangabad district to Rajiv Gandhi, the Prime Minister of India and Congress leader. However, the project went into limbo as the following state governments failed to follow it. In 2007, Manmohan Singh's government finally put a stamp of approval on it. The joint venture agreement was signed on 6 November 2007 and the company was incorporated on 22 November 2007. Commercial generation started from Unit-1 and 2 (2X250MW) of Bharatiya Rail Bijli Company Limited in 2016.

== Need for the plant ==
The railways need the plant because of the demands of a globalising economy and mega projects of the Railways such as the planned Dedicated Freight Corridors across the country. The electricity from this plant will be utilized by Indian Railways for running electric trains in Bihar, Jharkhand, West Bengal, Chhattisgarh, Maharashtra, Gujarat and Madhya Pradesh in the eastern and western regions of the country. The Union Cabinet of India has, in view of the high tariff charged by State Electricity Boards, approved the railways' proposal for using direct power supply from Central generating agencies from the 15 per cent unallocated central share of power. Railways are saving about Rs. 50 crore per annum due to implementation of these schemes for using direct power supply from NTPC/Central generating agencies. EPC is being undertaken by public sector major BHEL.

== Location ==
The project site is situated on a state highway which is 25 km south of NH-2 from Barun, 9 km from ‘Nabinagar Road’ Railway Station and 100 km from Gaya Airport.

== Inputs ==
Water requirement for the project is 60 cubic feet per second which is allocated from the upper stream of the Sone River (Indrapuri Barrage). Coal requirement for the project is 5 MTPA. The coal linkage of 5 MTPA has been accorded from Pachra & Pachra south block, North Karanpura Coalfield of Central Coalfields Limited which is approximately 215 km from the project site.

== Beneficiaries ==
The beneficiaries for the power generated from NTPC are Indian Railways (90%) and Bihar State (10%). PPA has been signed with both of the beneficiaries.

== Installed capacity ==
| Unit | Capacity (In MW) | Date of Commissioning | status |
|---|---|---|---|
| 1 | 250 | 2016 March | Commissioned |
| 2 | 250 | 2017 April | Commissioned |
| 3 | 250 | 2019 February | Commissioned |
| 4 | 250 | 2021 December | Commissioned |

== See also ==
- Nabinagar Super Thermal Power Project
