= Central Organisation for Modernisation of Workshops =

Indian Railways organisation

Central Organisation For Modernisation of Workshops
- Company type: Ministry of Railways
- Industry: Railways
- Founded: 1979; 47 years ago
- Headquarters: Railway Offices Complex, Tilak Bridge, New Delhi – 110002
- Area served: India
- Products: Indian Railways Parts
- Owner: Government of India
- Parent: Ministry of Railways through Railway Board (India)
- Website: cofmow.indianrailways.gov.in

The Central Organisation For Modernisation of Workshops (COFMOW) was a public sector undertaking in India, created in 1979 to modernise the workshops of Indian Railways. It was established through funding from the World Bank and is located in New Delhi, the national capital.
It was dissolved by Indian Govt w.e.f Dec 01, 2022.

== History ==
At the time of integration of the Indian Railway system in 1952, there were 41 repair workshops dealing with periodic overhaul of coaches, wagons and locomotives. Day-to-day repairs were handled in over 300 repair depots and sick lines.

The last quarter century of planned development of Indian Railways has witnessed extensive changes in the mode of traction as well as development of new types of coaches and wagons. Diesel and electric locomotives have gradually replaced steam locomotives. The number of passenger coaches in service has almost doubled. The wagon stock holding is roughly 2.5 times that in 1951. Financial limitations, however, did not permit development of maintenance facilities compatible with the growth of rolling stock. Only 5 new workshops have been set up since 1952. The increased demand for maintenance was largely catered by piece-meal expansion of the existing facilities. Expenditure on workshops in this period was less than 2.5% of the total plan outlay on the railways. Nevertheless, to meet the requirement of new rolling stock, three new production workshops were set up.

The problems encountered in manufacture and maintenance of the rolling stock are largely due to obsolescence of machinery and plant, diverse product mix and layout deficiencies. The situation in respect of machinery and plant is a source of major concern. The proportion of overage machines in 1979 had increased to 77% from 47% in 1952. Due to paucity of available maintenance funds, an agreement was negotiated with the International Development Association of the World Bank for providing a credit of $95m for the first phase of workshop modernisation programme, expected to be completed by March 1983. Second and third phases of another 7 years envisage an estimated expenditure of Rs.400 crores inclusive of IDA Credits.

The unprecedented magnitude of this effort prompted the Indian Railways to set up a specialist organisation wholly devoted to the furtherance of this task. Thus, the Central Organisation for Modernisation of Workshops (COFMOW) came into existence in 1978 to implement the modernisation programme.

Cofmow is now the designated organisation of Indian Railways for selection, procurement and induction of modern workshop technologies and M&P.
P. Ananth, Principal Chief Mechanical Engineer at COFMOW, has been granted the administrative and financial powers of the Principal Chief Administrative Officer and redesignated as Chief Administrative Officer, COFMOW.
