= Indian Railway Finance Corporation =

Indian public sector undertaking

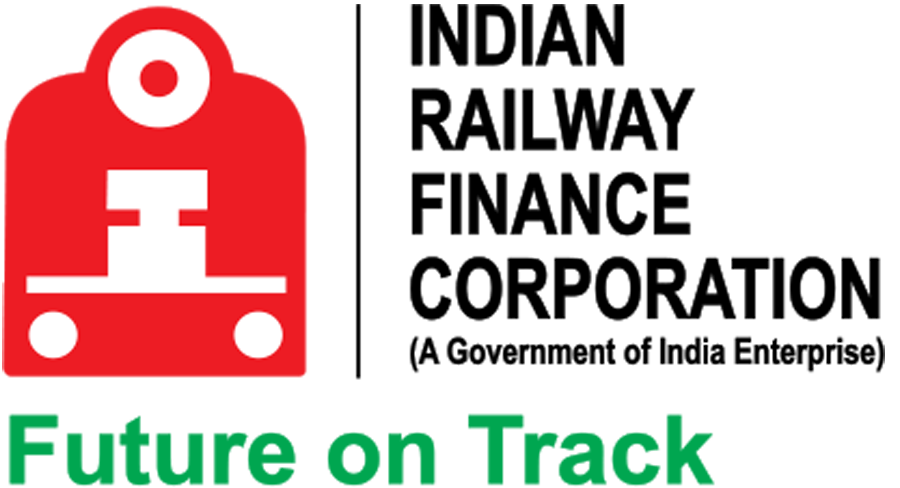
- Type: Public
- Traded as: NSE: IRFC; BSE: 543257
- ISIN: INE053F01010
- Industry: Financial services
- Founded: 12 December 1986
- Headquarters: New Delhi, India
- Key people: Manoj Kumar Dubey (Chairman & MD)
- Services: Leasing; Lending; Borrowing
- Revenue: ▲₹26,644 crore (US$2.8 billion) (2023-24)
- Operating income: ▲₹26,519 crore (US$2.8 billion) (2023-24)
- Net income: ▲₹6,412 crore (US$670 million) (2023-24)
- Total assets: ▲₹464,641 crore (US$48 billion) (2023-24)
- Total equity: ▲₹49,178 crore (US$5.1 billion) (2023-24)
- Owner: Government of India Ministry of Finance Union Government
- Website: irfc.co.in

The Indian Railway Finance Corporation (IRFC) is an Indian public sector undertaking (PSU) engaged in raising financial resources for expansion and running through capital markets and other borrowings. The Government of India owns a majority stake in the company, while the Ministry of Railways has administrative control. In March 2025, IRFC was given the Navaratna status by the Government of India, becoming the 26th PSU in this list.

== History ==
IRFC was founded on 12 December 1986. It started borrowing from the market in 1987–88.

The company launched its initial public offering on 18 January 2021 and got listed on the National Stock Exchange of India and Bombay Stock Exchange on 29 January 2021.

As of 2024-25 Q3 reports, its promoter group (Government of India) holds 86.36% ownership while the public has the rest of the 13.64% shares. In January 2026, Indian Railway Finance Corporation (IRFC) reported its highest ever quarterly profit for the third straight quarter, driven by steady loan growth and better margins. Profit after tax for the December 2025 quarter rose 11% YoY to Rs 1,802 crore.

== Operations ==
IRFC raises money through financial bonds and from banks and financial institutions.

== Board of directors ==
IRFC's Board of Directors includes Uma Ranade as chairman and managing director, Shelly Verma as Director (Finance), Baldeo Purushartha as Nominee Director, Vallabhbhai Maneklal Patel as Non-Official Independent Director, and Sheela Pandit as Non-Official Independent Director.

== See also ==
- Rail Vikas Nigam, involved in building rail infrastructure required by the Indian railways.
