= Express trains in India =

Express trains in India

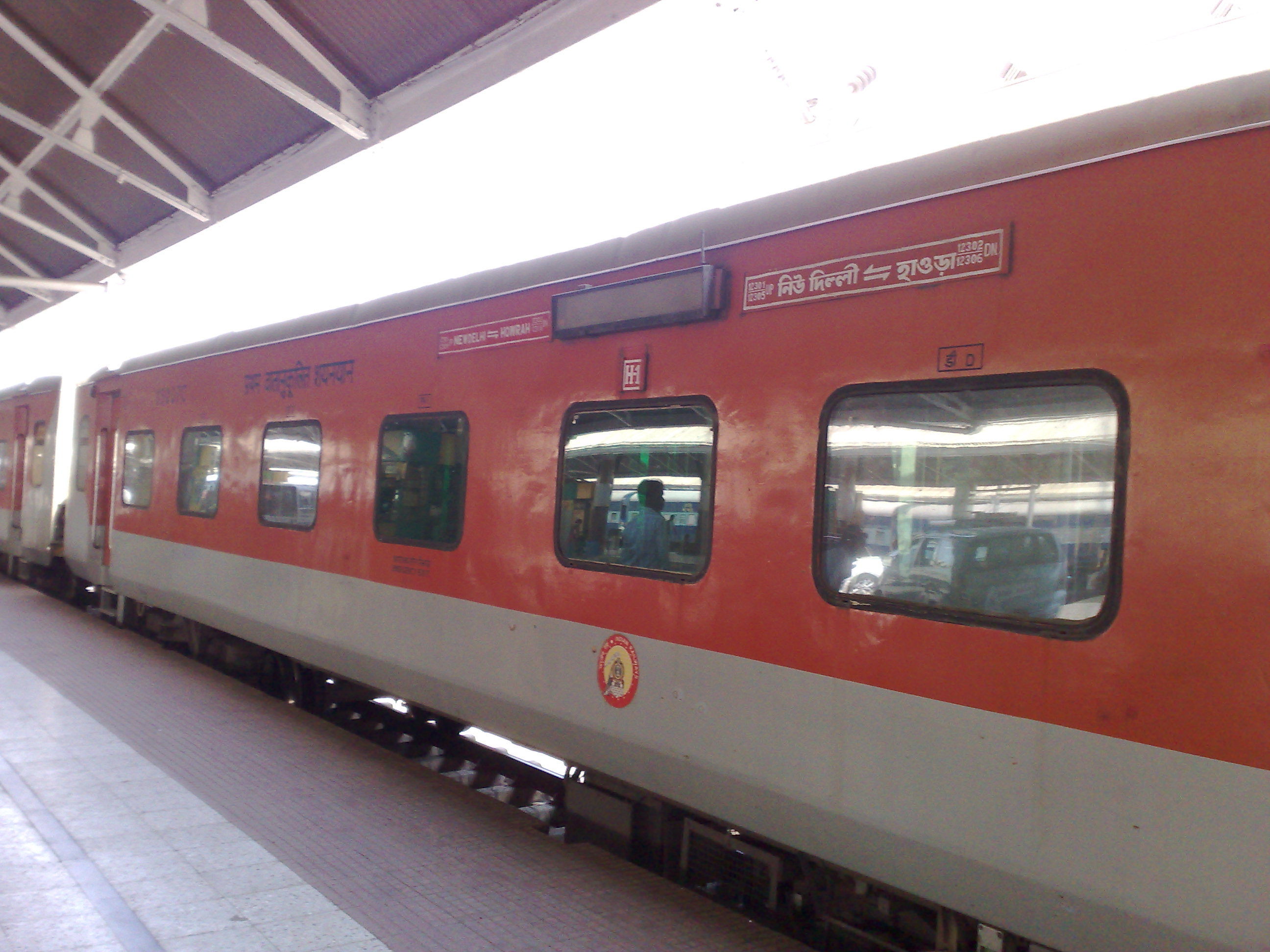
Rajdhani Express

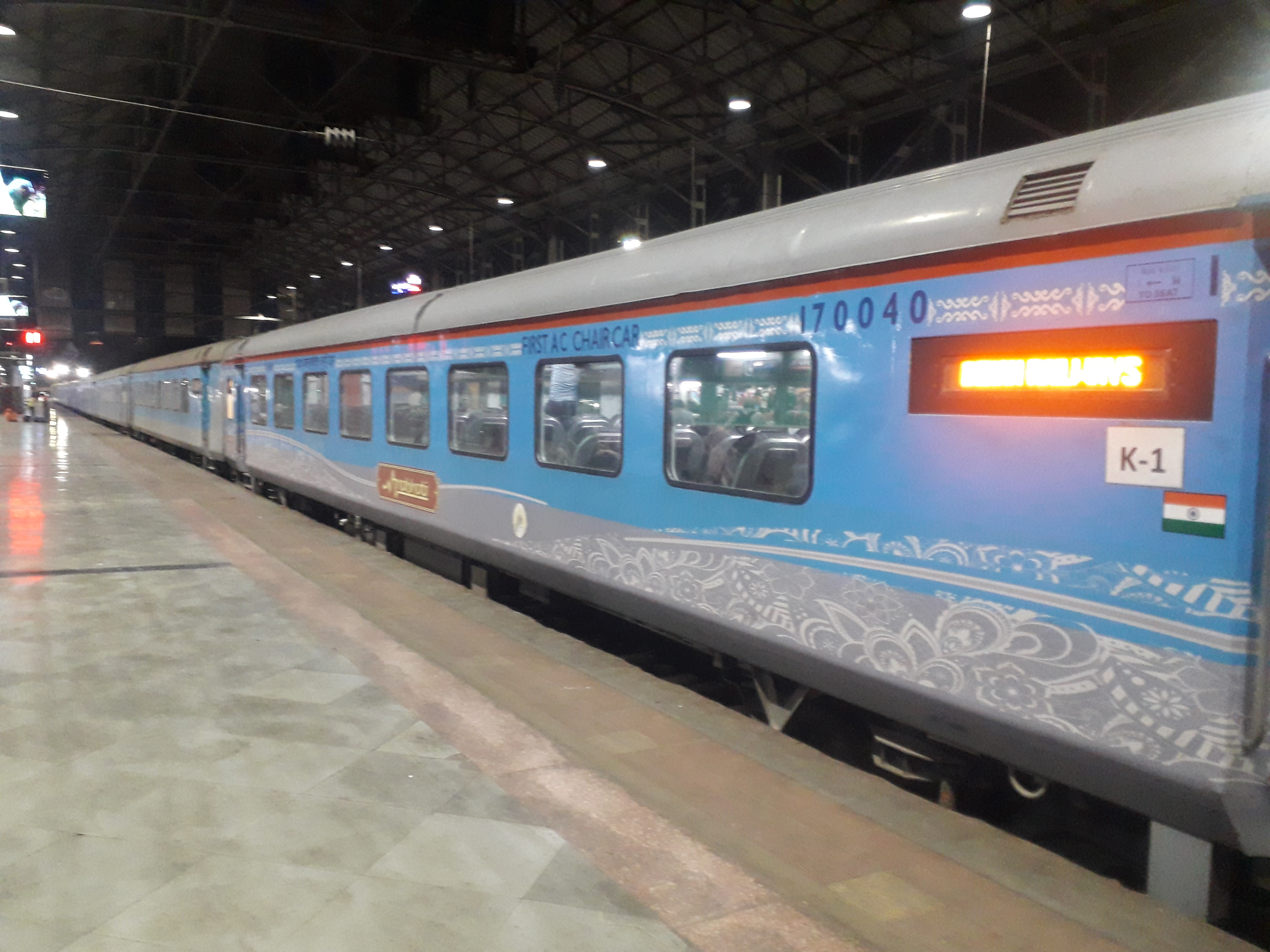
Shatabdi Express

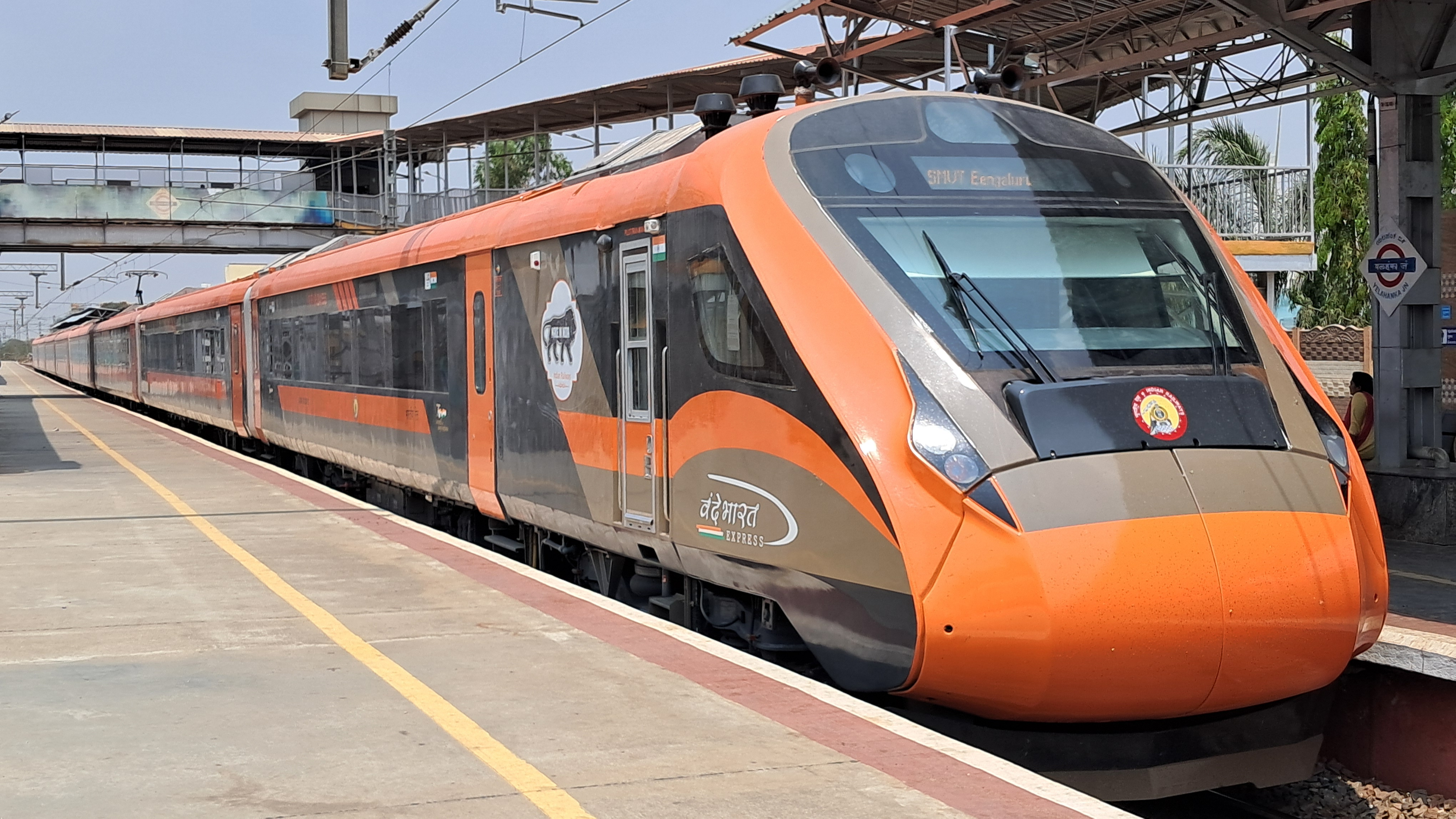
Vande Bharat Express

India has a system of express passenger trains operated by Indian Railways and overseen by the Ministry of Railways of the Government of India. As of 2023, the Indian Railways maintains over 108,706 kilometres (67,547 mi) of tracks, spanning across 68,584 kilometres (42,616 mi) in route length, and operates nearly 3,000 express trains daily. Express trains are permitted to reach higher speeds and have limited stops than ordinary passenger trains. Any passenger train with an average speed higher than 55 kilometres per hour (34 mph) is considered super-fast.

As of 2023, India does not have any operational high-speed trains. The maximum operational speed of 160 kilometres per hour (99 mph) is achieved by Gatiman Express and Rani Kamalapati–Hazrat Nizamuddin Vande Bharat Express on the Tughlakabad–Agra section.

Earlier steam locomotive operated trains largely operated below 100 kilometres per hour (62 mph). With the introduction of electric locomotives in later 1920s and newer steam locomotives, speeds of 100 kilometres per hour (62 mph) were achieved. With the movement to AC traction in late 1950s and introduction of diesel locomotives, maximum speeds of up to 120 kilometres per hour (75 mph) were achieved in the late 1960s. With the introduction of high power electric locomotives in the 1990s, operating speeds of 130 kilometres per hour (81 mph) was achieved with further developments leading to speeds of maximum speeds of 160 km/h (99 mph) being realized in the early 2010s. Vande Bharat Express, an electric multiple unit run service introduced in 2019, is the fastest operational express train with a maximum permitted speed of 160 kilometres per hour (99 mph).

== History ==
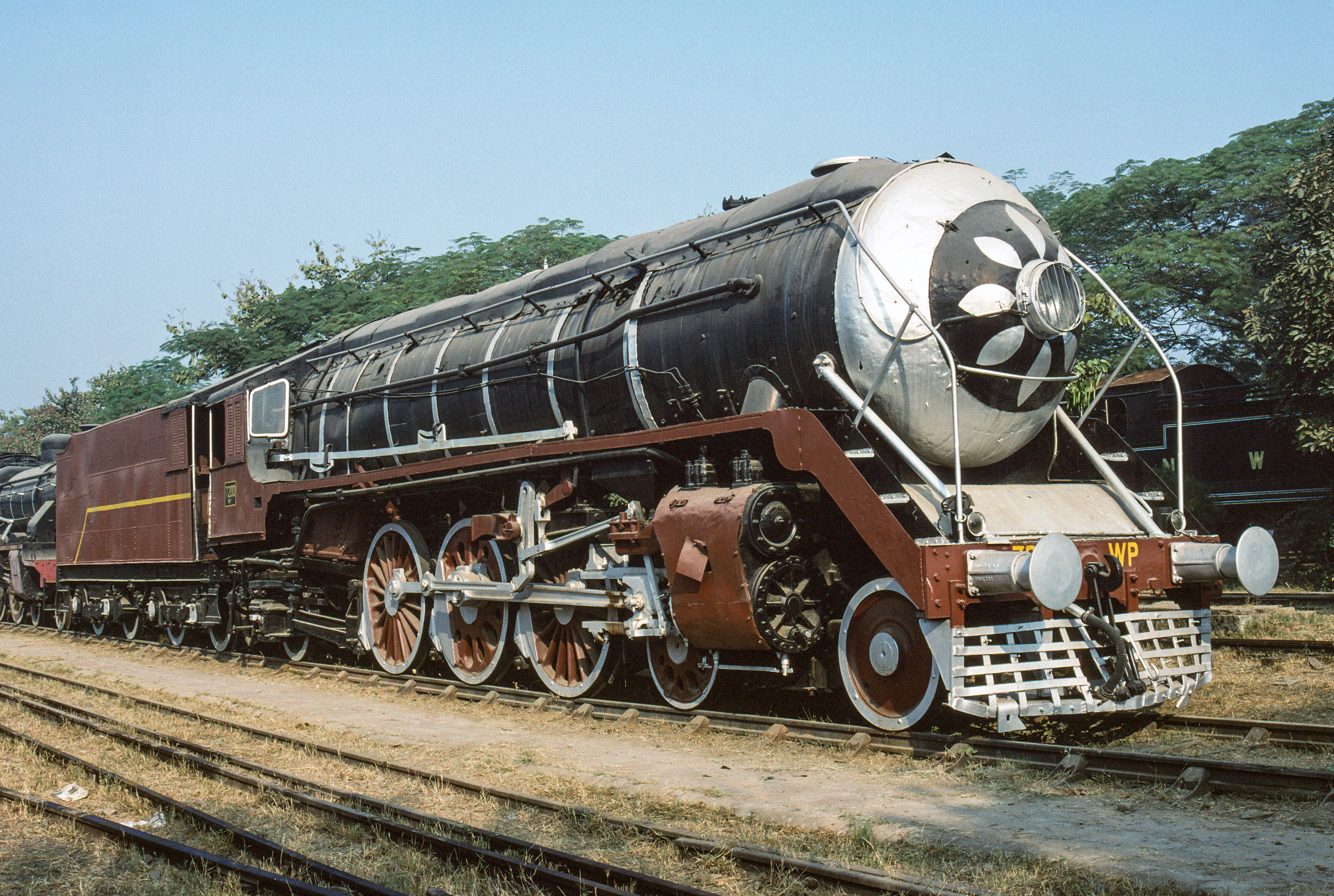
WP class steam locomotives helped express trains reach speeds of 100 km/h (62 mph) in 1947.

The history of the Indian Railway began in 1832 with the proposal to construct the first railway line in India at Madras. In 1837, the first train ran on Red Hill railway line between Red Hills and Chintadripet in Madras and was hauled by a rotary steam engine imported from England. In 1853, the first passenger train ran between Bombay and Thane which covered a distance of 54 km (34 mi) in 57 minutes, averaging a speed of 57 km/h (35 mph). Earlier trains ran using steam locomotives, where barely reached speeds of 90 km/h (56 mph). With the introduction of WP class locomotives in 1947, speeds of 100 km/h (62 mph) were operated commercially. While the first electric train ran in Bombay in 1925 on DC traction, WCP-1 class electric locomotives were introduced in 1928, capable of hauling trains at speeds of up to 137 km/h (85 mph), though trains operated at lower speed.

On 1 April 1929, Grand Trunk Express commenced operations between Peshawar in the North Western Railway and Mangalore with two coaches detached and connected to Madras further. The Frontier Mail made its inaugural run between Bombay and Peshawar in 1928. Technical advancements led to automatic colour light signals become operational between Bombay and Byculla in 1928. In the subsequent years, the route from Bombay to Poona was electrified and in June 1930, the first deluxe train, Deccan Queen began running, hauled by a WCP-1 locomotives with seven coaches along the route. The Grand Trunk express commenced operating as a dedicated daily train between Madras and Delhi from 1 September 1930. WDM-1, the first diesel locomotive introduced in 1957 was capable of speeds of up to 104 km/h (65 mph). In 1957, Indian Railways adopted 25 kV 50 Hz AC traction with the first runs beginning in December 1959 with the WAM-1 locomotives, capable of reaching speeds of up to 112 km/h (70 mph).

In 1960, the Railway Board of India commissioned a study to increase the speed of its trains, which was restricted to 96 km/h (60 mph) on the existent broad gauge lines. A target of 160 km/h (99 mph) with an intermediate stage of 120 km/h (75 mph) was set for passenger trains. Research Design and Standards Organisation (RDSO) started work on the same in 1962 with field trials commencing in 1967. The coaches were manufactured by the Integral Coach Factory at Madras and hauled by diesel locomotives. On 19 February 1969, the Government of India announced the introduction of a new express train capable of reaching speeds of up to 120 km/h (75 mph) in the railway budget. On 1 March 1969, the first Rajdhani Express was flagged off from New Delhi to Howrah, which reached a maximum speed of 120 km/h (75 mph) and completed the 1,450 km (900 mi) trip in 17 hours 20 minutes at an average speed of 84 km/h (52 mph). In 1980, the WAP-1 electric locomotives capable of reaching speeds of 130 km/h (81 mph) were introduced to haul express trains. Shatabdi Express introduced in 1988, were capable of running at a maximum speed of 130 km/h (81 mph). WAP-5 class locomotives, initially imported from ABB in 1995 and later manufactured at Chittaranjan Locomotive Works in India, reached 184 km/h (114 mph) in trials and later set an Indian speed record by hauling an express train between Delhi and Agra at a speed of 160 km/h (99 mph) in 2014.

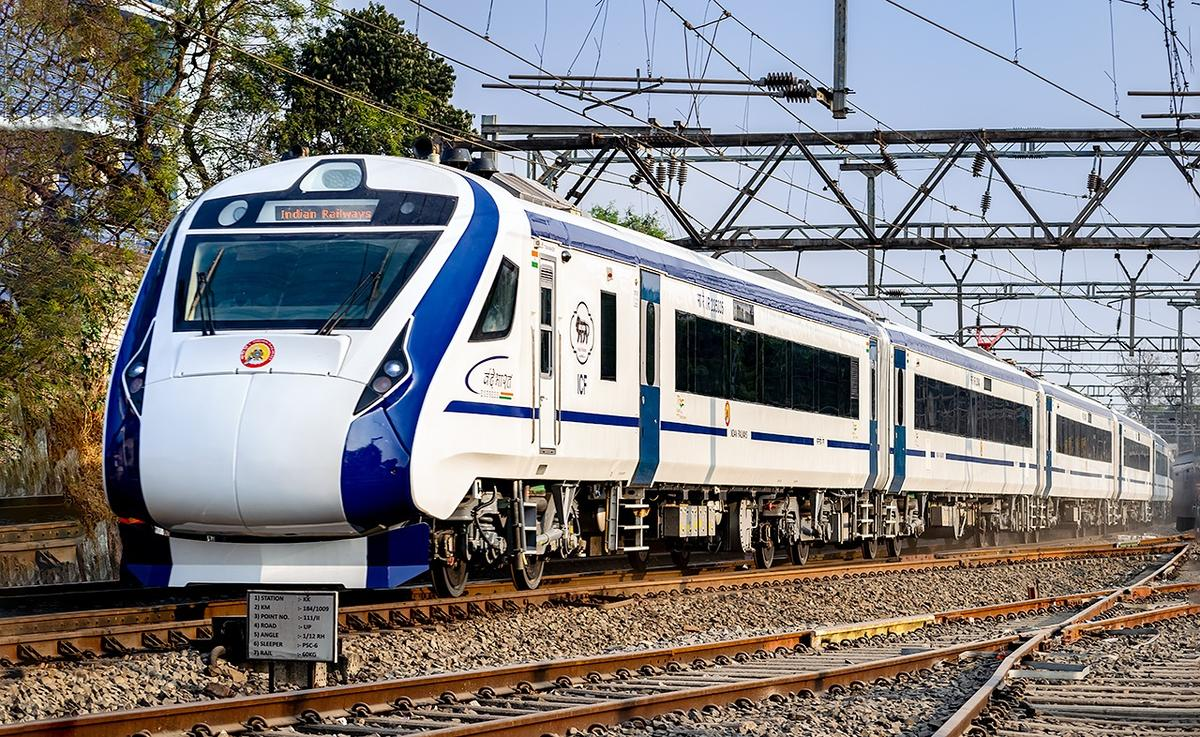
Introduced in 2019, Vande Bharat Express is the fastest express train in India.

In December 2009, the Ministry of Railways of Government of India envisaged the implementation of regional high-speed rail projects to provide services at 250–350 km/h (160–220 mph), and planning for corridors connecting commercial, tourist, and pilgrimage hubs. On 25 July 2013, Government of India established the High Speed Rail Corporation for the implementation of high-speed rail corridor projects and in 2014, the Diamond Quadrilateral high speed rail project was approved by the government. In April 2016, the WAP-5 hauled Gatimaan Express became the fastest commercial train in India, with a maximum operational speed of 160 km/h (99 mph). In 2018, Integral Coach Factory in Chennai, rolled out a semi-high-speed EMU train-set, capable of reaching 180 km/h (110 mph). In 2019, the first Vande Bharat Express entered commercial service with a maximum operational speed of 160 km/h (99 mph). The actual operating speed was much lower due to track restrictions and congestion with top speeds restricted to 130 km/h (81 mph) for most trains. In December 2023, two modified WAP-5 locomotives were used to haul the Amrit Bharat train-set in a push-pull configuration, capable of reaching speeds of up to 160 km/h (99 mph).

== Definition ==
According to the Ministry of Railways, express trains are classified as follows:

- Super-fast express: Any passenger train with an average speed higher than 55 km/h (34 mph) on 1,676 mm (5 ft 6 in) broad gauge.
- Mail: Trains which earlier had a mail coach attached. Newer trains are not named so, but older trains remain in operation.
- Express: Express trains travel faster and have fewer stops than ordinary passenger trains.

== Network and infrastructure ==
=== Track ===
As of 2023, it manages the fourth largest national railway system by size with a track length of 132,310 km (82,210 mi), running track length of 106,493 km (66,172 mi) and route length of 68,584 km (42,616 mi). Track sections are rated for speeds ranging from 80 to 200 km/h (50 to 124 mph), though the maximum speed attained by passenger trains is 160 km/h (99 mph). In 2009, Indian Railways started a plan to increase the speed of passenger trains to 160–200 km/h (99–124 mph) on dedicated conventional tracks and improve the existing conventional lines to handle speeds of up to 160 km/h (99 mph).

Dedicated Freight Corridor Corporation of India has built dedicated freight corridors across India to divert cargo traffic from the passenger railway tracks, thus helping increase the operational speed of the passenger trains to 160 km/h (99 mph). In 2014, the Diamond Quadrilateral high-speed rail network project was launched by Government of India and is envisioned to connect the four major metro cities of India namely: Chennai, Delhi, Kolkata and Mumbai.

The Ministry of Railways envisaged to have dedicated standard gauge tracks capable of top speeds of 300–350 km/h (190–220 mph) with trains running on elevated corridors to isolate high-speed train tracks by 2026 and identified probable routes for the same. A 174 km (108 mi) segment of track in the Tughlakabad–Agra Cantonment section supports semi-high speed passenger traffic of up to 160 km/h (99 mph).

=== Rolling stock ===
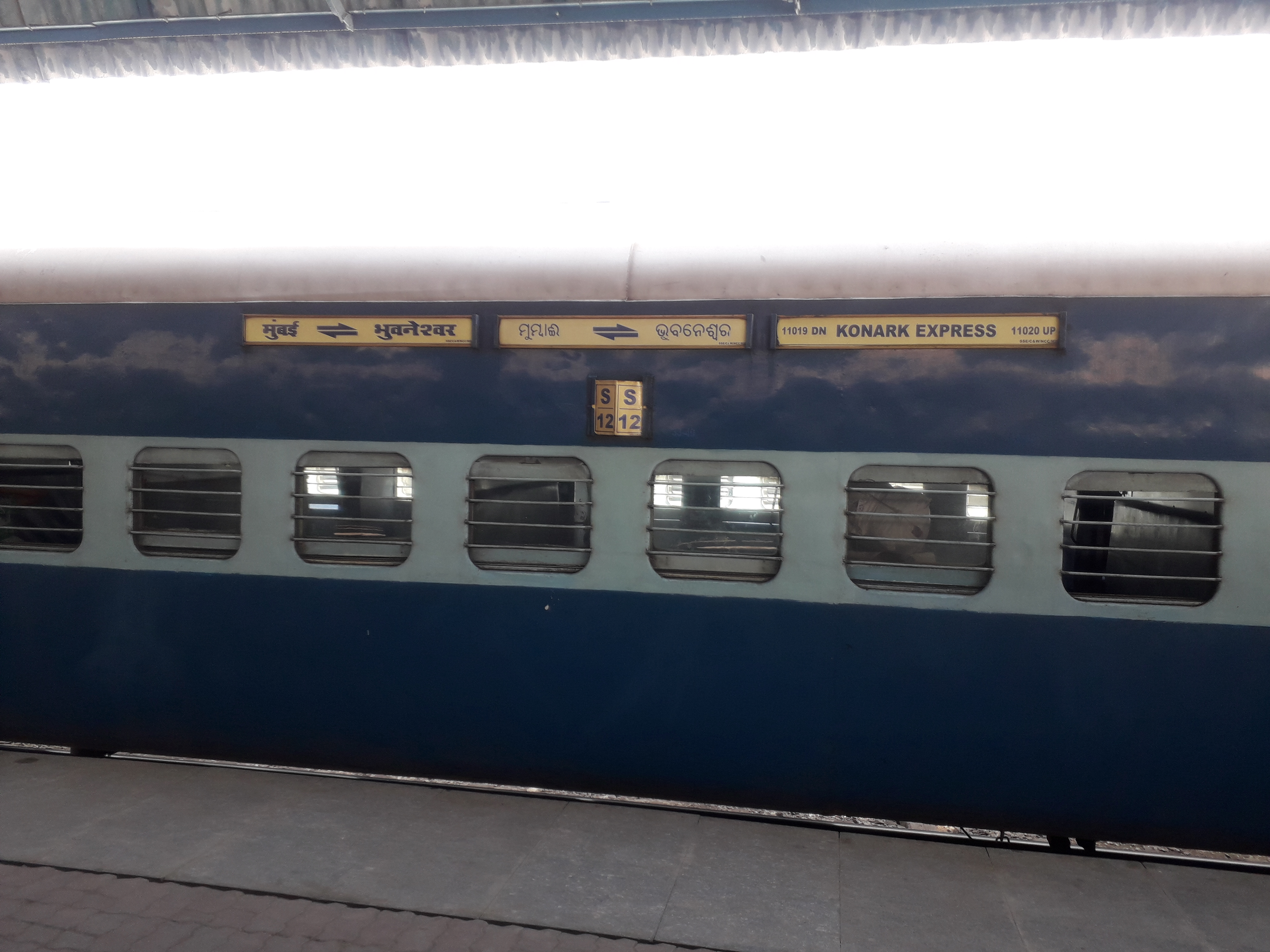
ICF coach

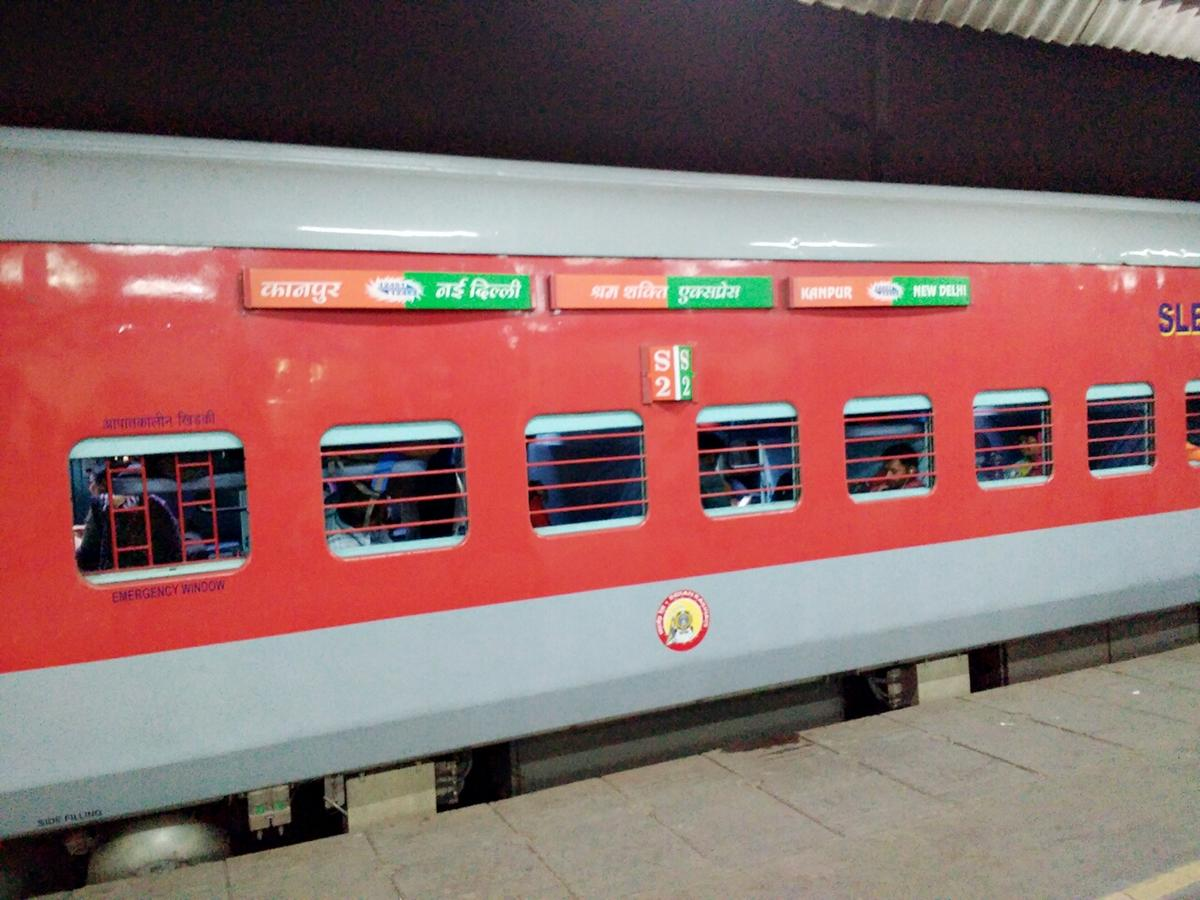
LHB coach

The early express rail coaches were based on a prototype by a Swiss company and were termed as ICF coaches after Integral coach factory (ICF), the first coach manufacturing unit in India. These coaches, manufactured from 1955 to 2018, were largely in use till the early 2010s. From the late 1990s, the ICF coaches were replaced by safer and newer LHB coaches designed by Linke-Hofmann-Busch of Germany. In the late 2010s, Indian railways started upgrading the coaches of select express trains from LHB to new Tejas coaches with enhanced features. As of March 2022, Indian Railways had 84,863 passenger coaches.

Semi-high speed Train 18 was rolled out in 2018. These self-propelled EMU train sets manufactured by Integral Coach Factory are capable of reaching 180 kilometres per hour (110 mph). These trains have eight or sixteen coaches with driver cabins on both ends, which eliminates the time needed for turnaround at the terminal station with faster acceleration and deceleration, enabling the train to travel at a top speed for longer distance. Coaches are manufactured by five manufacturing units of the Indian Railways and public sector companies BEML and BHEL. The coaching stock have unique five or six digit identifiers. Till 2018, the first two digits indicating the year of manufacture and the last three digits indicating the class. In 2018, the numbering system was changed with the first two digits indicating the year of manufacture and the last four digits indicating the sequence number.

=== Stations ===
As of March 2022, Indian Railways manages and operates 7,308 stations. Prior to 2017, the stations were classified into seven categories based on their earnings. Since 2017, Indian Railways categorizes the stations by commercial importance into three different categories namely Non Suburban Group (NSG), Suburban Group (SG) and Halt Group (HG). These are further subdivided into subcategories based on their commercial importance (NSG 1-6, SG 1-3 and from HG 1-3). The commercial importance of a station is determined by taking into account its passenger footfall, earnings and strategic importance and these categories are used to determine the minimum essential amenities required by each station. Express trains stop at select set of stations identified using a combination of factors including commercial importance, traffic and capabilities.

== Services ==
=== Travel classes ===
Indian Railways offers various travel classes on its coaches. For the purpose of identification in passenger trains, coaches in a train-set are assigned an alpha-numeric code. The first letter identifies the coach class and the second letter identifies the coach number. The berths and seats are numbered by an alphanumeric code with the letter(s) identifying the berth/seat type and numbers identifying the position. In standard coaches, the berths and seats are classified as follows:

Coach code (first digit)
Class	Code	Image	Description
First AC	H		It is the most luxurious and expensive class in most express trains. They have separate air-conditioned compartments with private lockable doors, bedding, dedicated attendants and meals served at seat.
First Class	F		First class is similar to first AC coaches with a combination of cabins and berths but are non air-conditioned and do not have all the facilities of first AC coaches. They were started to be phased out of normal express trains starting in the 2000s and the last coach being de-commissioned in 2015. The First class is still in use in toy trains where the coaches consist of seats similar to chair cars.
Executive Anubhuti	EA		Executive Anubhuti is the premium class of air-conditioned chair car equipped with retractable, large cushioned seats in 2x2 configuration. The class is equipped with an entertainment system, large luggage compartments, passenger information system, dedicated reading lights, power sockets and call buttons, modular bio toilets with automated taps. Meals often provided as a part of the journey ticket. The class is available only in select trains.
AC Executive Class	E		AC Executive Class is often the top most class of air-conditioned chair car in express trains. It is equipped with large retractable seats in 2x2 configuration. The class is equipped with dedicated reading lights and power sockets, modular bio toilets with automated taps. Meals are often provided as a part of the journey ticket. In Vande Bharat Express trains, the class is equipped with more features including rotating seats, CCTVs, passenger information system, larger toilets, USB ports and automated doors.
Executive Vistadome	EV		AC Tourist cars have vistadome coaches with glass roofs and extra wide windows. The interiors are similar to AC chair car coaches. Select trains operating mostly on tourist circuits are equipped with such coaches. Indian Railways plans to introduce these coaches in all mountain railways.
Second AC or AC 2-tier	A		Second AC or AC 2-tier is an air-conditioned sleeping car with wide sealed windows. There are four berths arranged in two-tiers facing each other in a single bay with two-tiered berths arranged on the sides lengthwise across the corridor. Individual berths are equipped with curtains, simple bedding, reading lights and charging sockets. Food is available on order or as a part of the ticket depending on the train.
Third AC or AC 3-tier	B		Third AC or AC 3-tier is an air-conditioned sleeping car. There are six berths arranged in three-tiers facing each other in a single bay with foldable middle berths and two-tiered berths arranged on the sides lengthwise across the corridor. There are common charging sockets and lights in each compartment with simple bedding provided. Food is available on order or as a part of the ticket depending on the train with the same menu shared with AC 2-tier.
AC 3-tier economy	M		AC 3-tier economy coaches are air-conditioned sleeping cars similar to AC 3-tier. Compared to 3-tier coaches, they have an extra middle berth along the aisle. The coaches were first introduced in Garib Rath trains and only a few trains operate with such coaches. Bedding is available for rent and the coaches have facilities like charging sockets and lights similar to AC 3-tier coaches.
AC Chair Car	C		AC chair car are air-conditioned coaches equipped with retractable seats in 3x2 configuration. The class has cushioned seats with tray tables and are equipped with LED reading lights, power sockets along the window side. Meals are provided as a part of the journey ticket in select trains. In Vande Bharat Express trains, the class is equipped with more features including passenger information system, CCTVs, larger toilets and automated doors.
Sleeper	S		Sleeper class is the most common sleeping car coach in Indian Railways. There are six berths arranged in three-tiers facing each other in a single bay with foldable middle berths and two-tiered berths arranged on the sides lengthwise across the corridor. The coaches are not air-conditioned and have open-able windows. There are common charging sockets, ceiling mounted fans and lights in each compartment. Food is available on order or can be purchased from vendors.
Second sitting	D/J		Second sitting is the most common chair car coach and the cheapest in the Indian Railways. It is common in most day-time running trains with six seats arranged in 3x3 configuration. The seats may face each other or towards the same side. The coaches are not air-conditioned and have open-able windows. There are common charging sockets, ceiling mounted fans and lights in each compartment. Food is available on order or can be purchased from vendors.
Unreserved or General	UR/GS		Unreserved or general coaches are second seating coaches which are not available for reservation and seats are taken on available basis. One or more of these coaches are attached to express trains while dedicated passenger trains might also have all unreserved coaches. Tickets are valid on any train on a route only for within 24 hours of purchase.

=== Trains ===
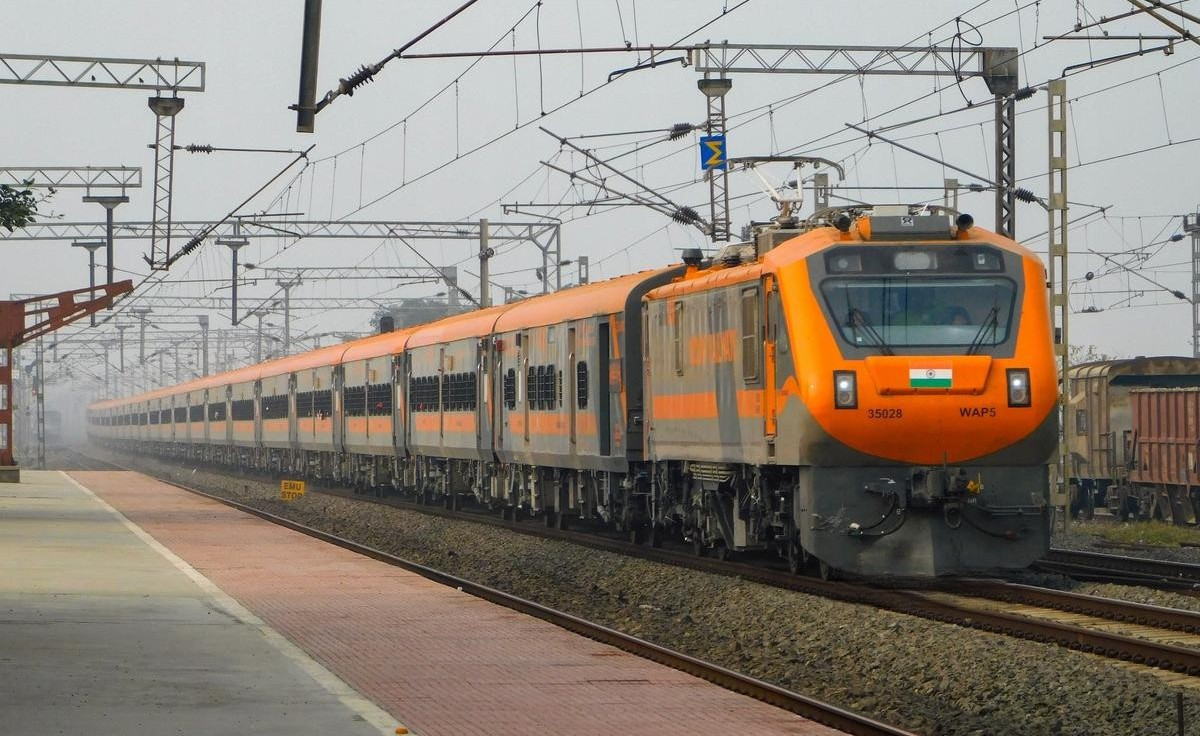
Amrit Bharat Express

Indian Railways operates various classes of Express trains. The trains are classified on the basis of average speed and facilities, with express trains having fewer halts, priority on rail network and faster average speed. The trains are identified by five-digit numbers with train-pairs traveling in opposite directions usually labelled with consecutive numbers. Express trains often have specific unique names for easy identification. Rajdhani Express introduced in 1969 were the first trains to reach speeds of up to 120 kilometres per hour (75 mph). Shatabdi Express, introduced in 1988, are capable of running at a maximum speed of 150 kilometres per hour (93 mph). In 2019, Vande Bharat Express was launched with self-propelled EMU train-sets capable of reaching maximum speed of 180 kilometres per hour (110 mph) with operational speeds restricted to 130–160 kilometres per hour (81–99 mph). A non-airconditioned semi-high speed trainset hauled by two modified WAP-5 locomotives was launched as Amrit Bharat Express. A high-speed rail line is under construction between Mumbai and Ahmedabad which will become the first true high-speed rail line when completed in 2026.

As of 2023, the maximum operational speed of 160 kilometres per hour (99 mph) is achieved by Gatiman Express and Vande Bharat Express on the above section. India Railways operates various categories of express trains including Vande Bharat Express, Rajdhani Express, Shatabdi Express, Amrit Bharat Express, Garib Rath Express, Double Decker Express, Tejas Express, Gatimaan Express, Humsafar Express, Duronto Express, Yuva Express, Uday Express, Jan Shatabdi Express, Sampark Kranti Express, Vivek Express, Rajya Rani Express, Mahamana Express, Antyodaya Express, Jan Sadharan Express, Suvidha Express and Intercity Express. As of 2022, Indian Railways operated 2,999 express trains on average daily.

List of fastest trains in India
Name	Avg. speed	Max. speed	Ref
New Delhi–Varanasi Vande Bharat Express	95 kilometres per hour (59 mph)	130 kilometres per hour (81 mph)	
Varanasi–New Delhi Vande Bharat Express	94 kilometres per hour (58 mph)	130 kilometres per hour (81 mph)	
Rani Kamalapati–Hazrat Nizamuddin Vande Bharat Express	92 kilometres per hour (57 mph)	160 kilometres per hour (99 mph)	
Gatiman Express	91 kilometres per hour (57 mph)	160 kilometres per hour (99 mph)	
Mumbai Central–New Delhi Tejas Rajdhani Express	90 kilometres per hour (56 mph)	130 kilometres per hour (81 mph)	

=== Ticketing and fares ===
In 1986, computerized ticketing and reservations were introduced before which ticketing was done manually. Centralized computer reservation system was deployed in September 1996. The ticketing network at stations is computerized with the exception of few stations. The Indian Railways website went online in February 2000 and online ticketing was introduced on 3 August 2002 through IRCTC. Indian Railways now provides multiple channels for passengers to book tickets through website, smartphone apps, SMS, rail reservation counters at train stations, or through private ticket booking counters. Reserved tickets may be booked up to 60 days in advance and confirmed reservation tickets will show the passenger and fare details along with berth or seat number(s) allocated to them on the ticket.

In case of no confirmed reservation, a wait-list number is assigned and wait-listed tickets get confirmed if there are cancellations of already reserved tickets. Reservation against cancellation tickets is an intermediate category between the waiting and confirmed lists in sleeper classes which allows a ticket holder to board the train and share a berth. Reserved tickets can be booked by passengers who want to travel at short notice at higher fares through the Tatkal train ticket, where no refund is applicable on cancellation. A valid proof for the purchase of ticket along with photo identification is required to board the train. Unreserved tickets for short distance or unplanned travels may be purchased at stations or through UTS mobile app at any time before departure. Holders of such tickets may only board the general or unreserved coaches.

India has some of the lowest train fares in the world, and lower class passenger fares are subsidised. Discounted fares are applicable for railway employees, the differently-abled, students, athletes, patients and those taking competitive examinations. Seats of lower class of accommodation are reserved for women or senior citizens in some trains.

== See also ==
- Luxury rail trains in India
- MEMU
- Rail transport in India
- Urban rail transit in India
