= Train numbering in India =

Advancing five-digit train numbering

In accordance with an Indian Ministry of Railways decision, Indian Railways switched from its previous four-digit numbering system for passenger trains to a five-digit system on December 20, 2010.

== First digit ==
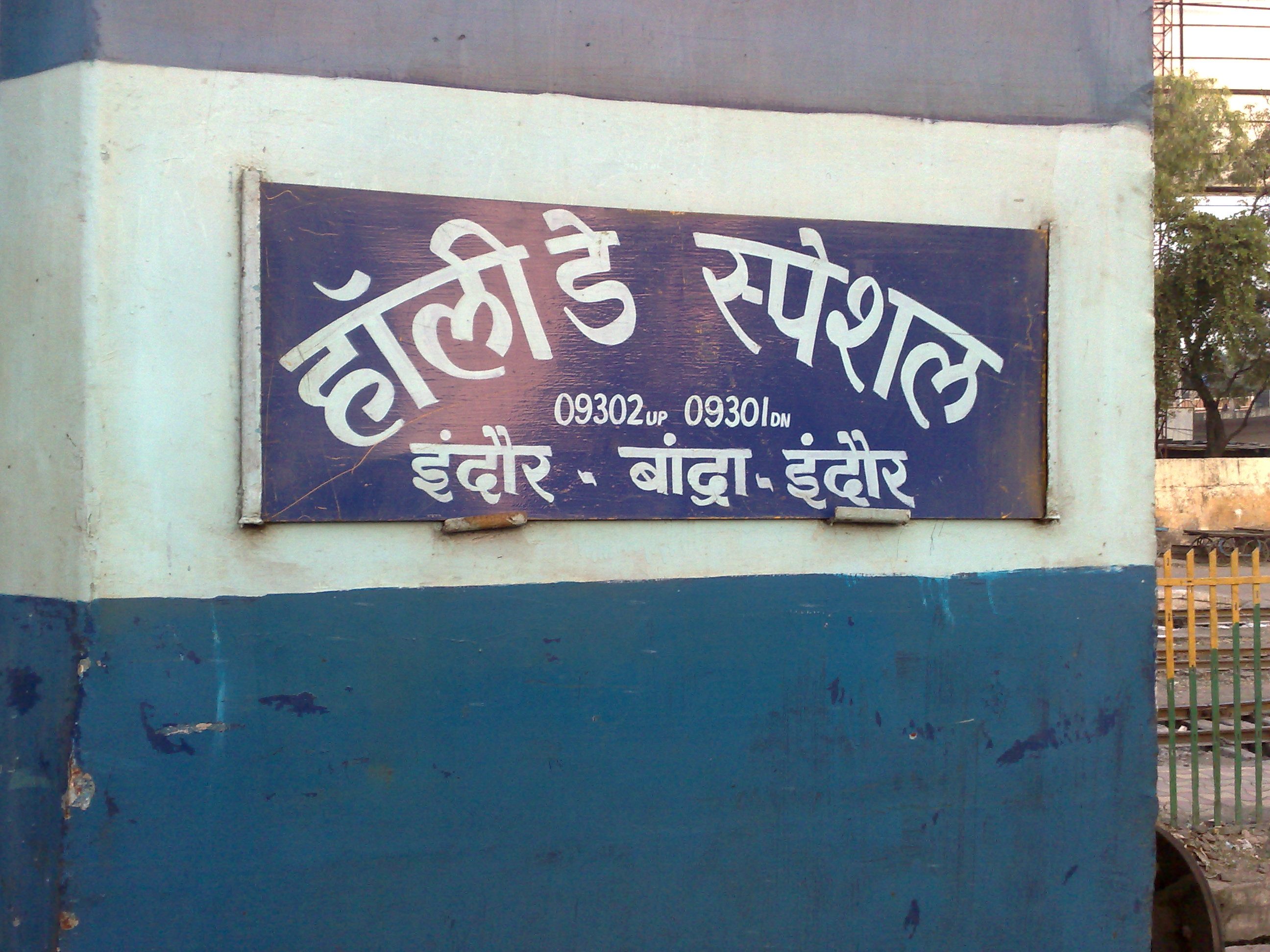
09302 Holiday Special at the Indore-Mumbai Bandra terminus

The first digit of the train number indicates the type of train:

- 0 (0XXXX): Special trains, such as summer, holiday and exam specials and trains to clear large passenger loads

Train Numbers starting with first two digits as 12 or 22 are super fast trains. Remaining are express trains.

- 1 or 2 (1XXXX or 2XXXX): Long-distance trains, such as superfast express trains or express trains
- 3 (3XXXX): Kolkata Suburban Railway
- 4 (4XXXX): Other suburban trains, such as the Chennai and Delhi Suburban Railways and the Hyderabad Multi-Modal Transport System
- 5 (5XXXX): Passenger trains with conventional coaches
- 6 (6XXXX): MEMU service
- 7 (7XXXX): Diesel multiple units and railcars
- 8 (8XXXX): Suvidha Express trains
- 9 (9XXXX): Mumbai Suburban Railway and Vande Metro

== Second digit ==
If the first digit is 0, 1 or 2, the second digit indicates the railway zone:

- 0 (10XXX or 00XXX): Konkan Railway
- 0 (20XXX): It is a new nomenclature used by railways to designate superfast or premium category trains
- 1 (Y1XXX): Central Railway trains, some West Central and North Central Railway trains
- 2 (Y2XXX): The Rajdhani, Shatabdi, Jan Shatabdi, Garib Rath, Duronto, Sampark Kranti and Gatimaan Express and all other superfast trains
- 3 (Y3XXX): Eastern Railway and East Central Railway trains
- 4 (Y4XXX): Northern Railway trains, some North Central and North Western Railway trains
- 5 (Y5XXX): Northeast Frontier and North Eastern Railway trains
- 6 (Y6XXX): Southern Railway and some South Western Railway trains
- 7 (Y7XXX): South Central and some South Western Railway trains
- 8 (Y8XXX): South Eastern, South East Central and East Coast Railway trains
- 9 (Y9XXX): Western and some West Central and North Western Railway trains

If the first digit is 3, the second digit indicates:

- 0 to 7 (Eastern Railway zone):
  - 31XXX: From Sealdah towards Naihati
  - 32XXX: From Sealdah towards Dankuni
  - 33XXX: From Sealdah towards Barasat
  - 34XXX: From Sealdah towards Ballygunge Junction (Sealdah South section)
  - 35XXX From Barddhaman Junction towards Katwa Junction
  - 36XXX: From Howrah towards Dankuni
  - 37XXX: From Howrah towards Bandel Junction
- 8 or 9 (38XXX or 39XXX, South Eastern Railway zone): May indicate destination(s) or branch line(s)

If the first digit is 4, the second digit indicates:

- 0 to 4 (Southern Railway zone):
  - 40ZXX: See Third digit section below
  - 41XXX: From Chennai Beach to Velachery
  - 42XXX: From Moore Market to Gummidipundi
  - 43AXX: See Third digit section below
- 5 or 6 (45XXX, 46XXX): Northern Railway zone
- 7 (47XXX): South Central Railway zone

If the first digit is 5, 6 or 7, the second digit identifies the railway zone where the train is operated or maintained:

- 0 (E0XXX): Konkan Railway
- 1 (E1XXX): Some Central and West Central Railway zone trains
- 2 (E2XXX): Some Northern, North Central, North Western, North Eastern and East Central Railway zone trains
- 3 (E3XXX): All Eastern and some East Central Railway zone trains
- 4 (E4XXX): Some Northern, North Central and North Western Railway zone trains
- 5 (E5XXX): Northeast Frontier and some North Eastern Railway zone trains
- 6 (E6XXX): Some Southern and South Western Railway zone trains
- 7 (E7XXX): South Central and some South Western Railway zone trains
- 8 (E8XXX): South Eastern, South East Central and East Coast Railway zone trains
- 9 (E9XXX): Western and some West Central and North Western Railway zone trains

If the first digit is 8, the second digit is 2. If the first digit is 9, the second digit identifies the railway zone where the train is operated or maintained:

- 0 to 4 (Western Railway zone):
  - 90XXX: Originating and terminating at Virar
  - 91XXX" Originating and terminating at Vasai Road-Bhayander
  - 92XXX: Originating and terminating at Borivali
  - 93XXX: Originating and terminating at Malad-Goregaon
  - 94XXX: Originating and terminating at Andheri-Bandra-Mumbai Central-CSMT
- 5 to 9 (Central Railway zone):
  - 95XXX: Fast trains
  - 96XXX: Slow trains travelling beyond Kalyan
  - 97XXX: Slow trains to the Harbour line
  - 98XXX: Slow trains to the Trans-Harbour line
  - 99XXX: Slow trains not travelling beyond Kalyan

== Third digit ==
If the first digit is 0, 1 or 2 and the second digit is 2 or 0(In case the first digit is 2), the third digit identifies the railway zone where the train is maintained, except for 0 (Y20XX, the Shatabdi and Jan Shatabdi Express in all zones):

- 1 (Y21XX): Central and some West Central zone trains
- 2 (Y22XX): Some Northern, North Central, North Western and Southern zone trains
- 3 (Y23XX): Eastern and East Central zone trains
- 4 (Y24XX): Some Northern, North Central and North Western zone trains
- 5 (Y25XX): Northeast Frontier and North Eastern zone trains
- 6 (Y26XX): Some Southern and South Western zone trains
- 7 (Y27XX): South Central and some South Western zone trains
- 8 (Y28XX): South Eastern, South East Central and East Coast zone trains
- 9 (Y29XX): Western, some West Central and North Western zone trains

If the second digit is other than 2, the second and third digits identify the railway division where the train is operated and maintained.

- 01: Karwar
- 10: Mumbai CR-Pune
- 11: Jhansi-Pune
- 12: Bhopal
- 13: Mumbai CR-Kolhapur
- 14: Solapur-Jabalpur
- 16: Bhopal
- 30: Howrah
- 31: Sealdah
- 32: Danapur
- 33: Dhanbad
- 34: Malda Town
- 35: Asansol
- 40: Delhi
- 41: Allahabad
- 42: Lucknow NR
- 43: Moradabad
- 45: Ambala
- 46: Firozpur
- 47: Bikaner
- 48: Jodhpur
- 50: Lucknow NER
- 51: Varanasi
- 52: Sonpur-Samastipur
- 53: Izzatnagar-Lucknow NER
- 54: Varanasi
- 55: Samastipur
- 56: Lumding
- 57: Katihar-Alipurduar
- 58: Lumding-Alipurduar
- 59: Tinsukia
- 60: Chennai
- 61: Chennai Egmore
- 62: Mysore
- 63: Thiruvananthapuram
- 65: Bangalore
- 66: Palakkad-Salem
- 67: Madurai
- 68: Tiruchirappalli
- 70: Secunderabad
- 72: Vijayawada
- 73: Hubli
- 74: Guntakal
- 75: Hyderabad
- 76: Kacheguda
- 77: Guntakal
- 78: Hubli
- 80: Kharagpur
- 81: Chakradharpur
- 82: Bilaspur
- 83: Sambalpur
- 84: Khurda Road
- 85: Visakhapatnam
- 86: Adra-Ranchi
- 90: Mumbai WR
- 91: Vadodara
- 92: Bhavnagar
- 93: Ratlam
- 94: Kota
- 95: Rajkot
- 96: Ajmer
- 97: Jaipur
- 98: Bhavnagar
- 99: Rajkot

If the first digit is 4 and the second digit is 0, the third digit indicates service between:

- 400XX: Chennai Beach and Tambaram
- 401XX: Chennai Beach and Tambaram
- 403XX: Chennai Beach and Tambaram
- 404XX: Chennai Beach and Tambaram
- 405XX: Chengalpattu and Tambaram
- 406XX: Chengalpattu and Tambaram
- 407XX: Chengalpattu and Tirumalpur
- 408XX: Chengalpattu and Kanchipuram

If the second digit is 3, the third digit indicates service between:

- 430XX: Chennai Central and Avadi
- 431XX: Chennai Central and Pattabiram
- 432XX: Chennai Central and Thiruvalluvar
- 434XX: Chennai Central and Arakkonam
- 435XX: Chennai Central and Thiruttani
- 436XX: Chennai Beach and Avadi
- 438XX: Chennai Beach and Arakkonam

If the second digit is 5 or 6, the third digit indicates the direction of travel:

- 4N0XX: DUK section
- 4N1XX: Delhi Shahdara–Shamali section
- 4N2XX: Ghaziabad–Meerut City section
- 4N5XX, 4N6XX: Ghaziabad–Hapur section, towards Aligarh
- 4N7XX: Shakur Basti–Rohtak section
- 4N8XX: Ring Railway

If the first digit is 5, 6 or 7, the second and third digits indicate the division where the train is operated and maintained:

- 01: Karwar
- 10: Mumbai CR-Pune
- 11: Jhansi-Pune
- 12: Bhopal
- 13: Mumbai CR-Kolhapur
- 14: Solapur-Jabalpur
- 16: Bhopal
- 20: Jaipur-Ajmer
- 21: Mumbai CR-Jhansi
- 22: Lucknow NER-Izzatnagar
- 23: Samastipur
- 24: Ambala
- 25: Samastipur
- 30: Howrah
- 31: Sealdah
- 32: Danapur
- 33: Dhanbad
- 34: Malda Town
- 35: Asansol
- 40: Delhi
- 41: Allahabad
- 42: Lucknow NR
- 43: Moradabad
- 45: Ambala
- 46: Firozpur
- 47: Bikaner
- 48: Jodhpur
- 50: Lucknow NER
- 51: Varanasi
- 52: Sonpur-Samastipur
- 53: Izzatnagar-Lucknow NER
- 54: Varanasi
- 55: Samastipur
- 56: Lumding
- 57: Katihar-Alipurduar
- 58: Lumding-Alipurduar
- 59: Tinsukia
- 60: Chennai
- 61: Chennai Egmore
- 62: Mysore
- 63: Thiruvananthapuram
- 65: Bangalore
- 66: Palakkad-Salem
- 67: Madurai
- 68: Tiruchirappalli
- 70: Secunderabad
- 72: Vijayawada
- 73: Hubli
- 74: Guntakal
- 75: Hyderabad
- 76: Kacheguda
- 77: Guntakal
- 78: Hubli
- 80: Kharagpur
- 81: Chakradharpur
- 82: Bilaspur
- 83: Sambalpur
- 84: Khurda Road
- 85: Visakhapatnam
- 86: Adra-Ranchi
- 90: Mumbai WR
- 91: Vadodara
- 92: Bhavnagar
- 93: Ratlam
- 94: Kota
- 95: Rajkot
- 96: Ajmer
- 97: Jaipur
- 98: Bhavnagar
- 99: Rajkot

If the first digit is 8, the third digit identifies the zone where the train is operated or maintained:

- 1 (821XX): Central and West Central zones, Konkan Railway and some North Central zone trains
- 2 (822XX): As authorized by the Railway Board
- 3 (823XX): Eastern zone and some East Central zone trains
- 4 (824XX): Northern zone and some North Central and North Western zone trains
- 5 (825XX): Northeast Frontier and North Eastern zone and some East Central zone trains
- 6 (826XX): Southern zone and some South Western zone trains
- 7 (827XX): South Central and some South Western zone trains
- 8 (828XX): South Eastern, South East Central and East Coast zone trains
- 9 (829XX): Western and some North Western zone trains

If the first digit is “9” and the second and third digits are “98/99” then this makes the Pune-Lonavla Local trains. The fourth and fifth digits are random numbers but this represents:

- ‘’ 8 ‘’ :(99800)- Daund Pune EMU Suburbans
- ‘’ 8 ‘’: 998XX- Pune Lonavala Suburbans
- ‘’Specials ‘’ 015XX - Pune Lonavla Suburban Specials
- ‘’ 9 ‘’ (9990X)- Pune Talegaon Suburbans

A new nomenclature for newly introduced Vande Bharat Express trains is 26NXX where N is the same regional code as mentioned for superfast express trains

Similarly for Vande Bharat Sleeper Expresses, a new nomenclature of 27NXX where N is the same regional code as mentioned for superfast express trains

== Fourth and fifth digits ==
The fourth and fifth digits are random numbers, making each five-digit train number unique. However, on the Delhi Suburban Railway the fourth digit (4NXPX) indicates the following:

- 0 to 2: MEMU
- 3 to 5: EMU
- 6 and 7: Conventional passenger coach
- 8: DEMU
- 9: Other rolling stock

== See also ==
- Wagon numbering system in India
