= Mumbai Central–New Delhi AC Suvidha Special Express =

Superfast Express train in India

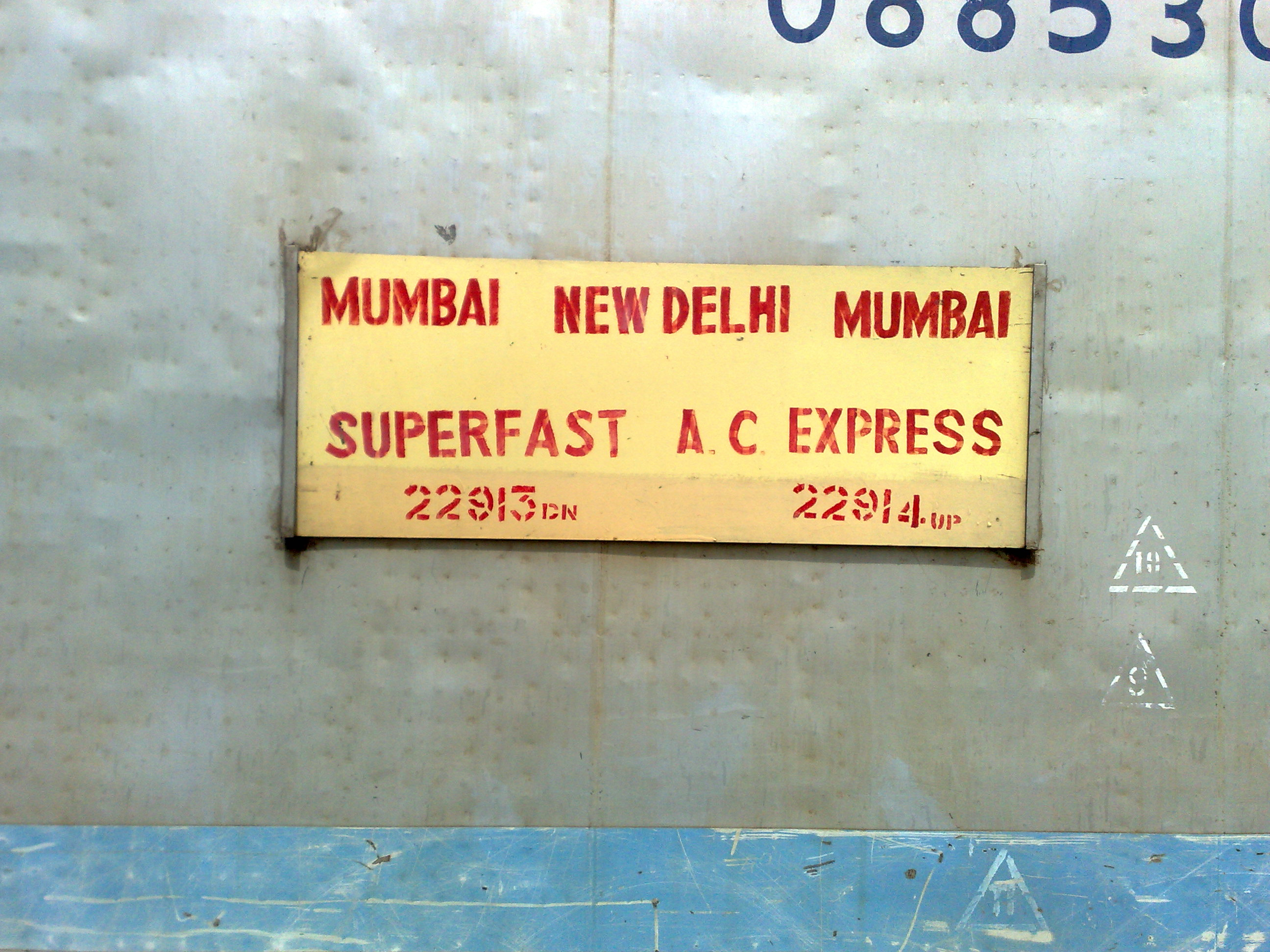

Overview
- Service type: Superfast Express, Suvidha Express
- First service: 1 October 2014
- Last service: 28 June 2015
- Current operator: Western Railways

Route
- Termini: Mumbai Central; New Delhi
- Stops: 2
- Distance travelled: 1,384 km (860 mi)
- Average journey time: 16 hours
- Service frequency: Tri–weekly
- Train number: 22913/22914

On-board services
- Classes: AC 2 tier, AC 3 tier
- Seating arrangements: No
- Sleeping arrangements: Yes
- Catering facilities: Pantry car attached
- Observation facilities: LHB coach

Technical
- Rolling stock: Standard Indian Railways LHB coach
- Track gauge: 1,676 mm (5 ft 6 in)
- Operating speed: 86.50 km/h (54 mph)

Mumbai Central–New Delhi AC Suvidha Special Express was a Superfast Express train of the Suvidha Express category belonging to Western Railway zone that ran between Mumbai Central and New Delhi in India. It operated as train number 22913 from Mumbai Central to New Delhi and as train number 22914 in the reverse direction, serving the states of Maharashtra and Delhi. It was one of the fastest train on Mumbai-Delhi Sector, at its maximum speed of 125 – 130 km/h.

As of 1 July 2015, this train service has been discontinued.

== Coaches ==
The 22913 / 14 Mumbai Central–New Delhi Air-conditioned Suvidha Special Express had 5 AC 2 tier, 8 AC 3 tier and 2 End on Generator coaches. In addition, it carried a pantry car and the final fare was inclusive of catering charges.

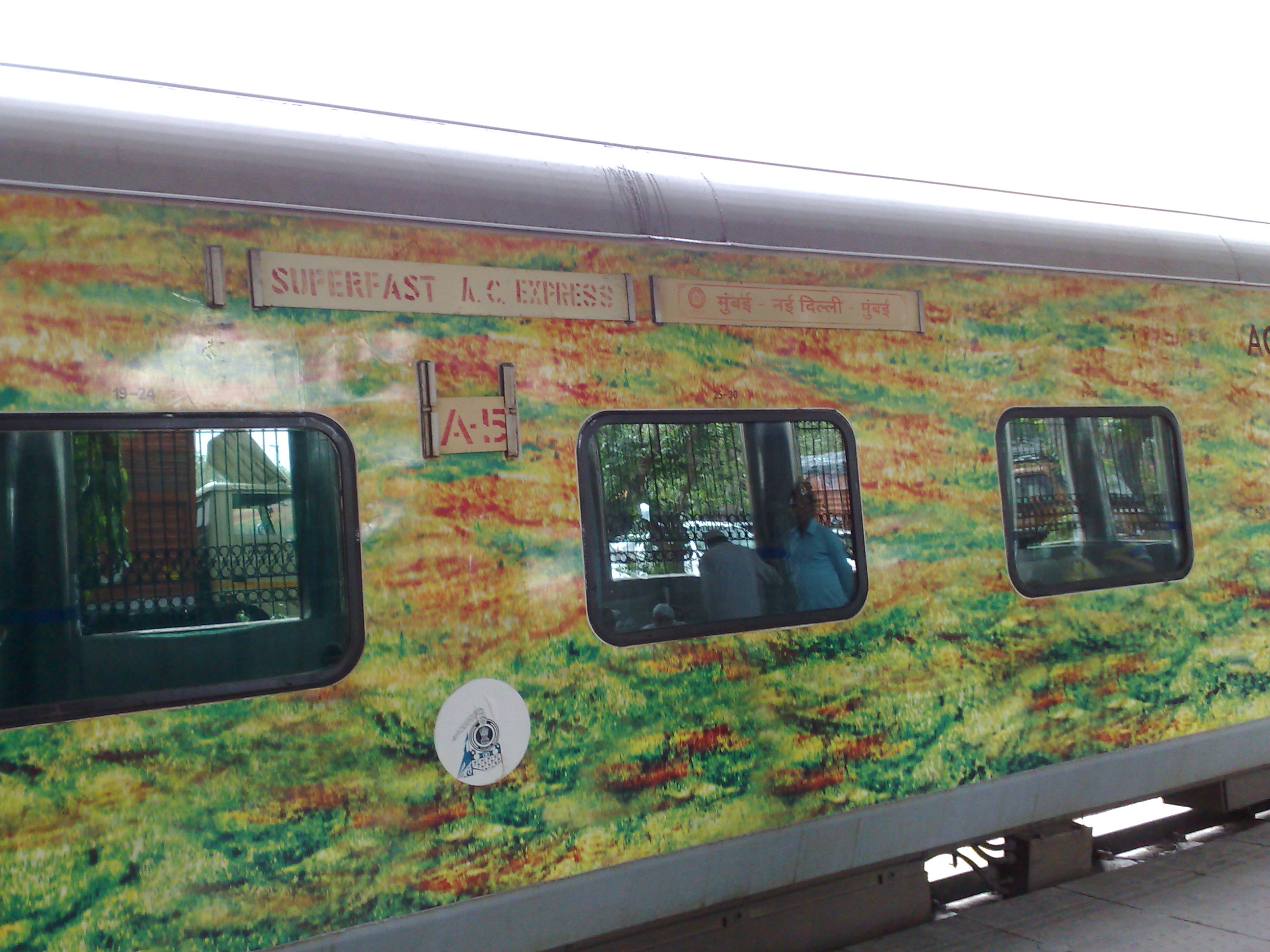
22914 Mumbai–New Delhi Premium AC Express – AC 2 tier

== Service ==
The 22913 Mumbai Central–New Delhi AC Suvidha Special Express covered the distance of 1384 kilometres in 15 hours 55 mins (86.95 km/h) and in 16 hours 05 mins as 22914 New Delhi–Mumbai Central AC Suvidha Special Express (86.05 km/h).

As the average speed of the train was above 55 km/h (34 mph), as per Indian Railways rules, its fare included a Superfast surcharge.

== Routeing and technical halts ==
The 22913 / 14 Mumbai Central–New Delhi AC Suvidha Special Express ran from Mumbai Central with technical halts at and via Vadodara Junction, Kota Junction to New Delhi.

== Traction ==
As the entire route is fully electrified, a Vadodara or Ghaziabad-based WAP-5 or WAP-7 powered the train for its entire journey.

== Timings ==
- 22913 Mumbai Central–New Delhi AC Suvidha Special Express left Mumbai Central every Wednesday, Friday & Sunday at 16:00 hrs IST and reached New Delhi at 07:55 hrs IST the next day.
- 22914 New Delhi–Mumbai Central AC Suvidha Special Express left New Delhi every Monday, Thursday & Saturday at 14:50 hrs IST and reached Mumbai Central at 06:55 hrs IST the next day.

== See also ==
- Dedicated Intercity trains of India
- Rajdhani Express
