= Pune–Kamakhya Suvidha Special Express =

Passenger train service

Pune - Kamakhya Suvidha Special Express
Overview
- Service type: Suvidha Express
- First service: 25 July 2015; 10 years ago
- Current operator: Central Railway zone

Route
- Termini: Pune Junction (PUNE); Kamakhya Junction (KYQ)
- Stops: 19
- Distance travelled: 2,841 km (1,765 mi)
- Average journey time: 52h 55m
- Service frequency: Twice week
- Train number: 82505/82506

On-board services
- Classes: AC 1 Tier, AC 2 Tier, AC 3 Tier, Sleeper 3 Tier, Unreserved
- Seating arrangements: No
- Sleeping arrangements: Yes
- Catering facilities: Yes
- Entertainment facilities: No

Technical
- Rolling stock: 2
- Track gauge: 1,676 mm (5 ft 6 in)
- Operating speed: 54 km/h (34 mph)

Pune - Kamakhya Suvidha Special Express is a Passenger express train of the Indian Railways connecting Pune in Maharashtra and Kamakhya Junction in Assam. It is currently being operated with 82355/82356 train numbers on a daily basis.

== Service ==
It averages 54 km/h as 82505 Pune - Kamakhya Suvidha Special Express starts on Thursday and covers 2841 km in 52 hrs 55 mins and 60 km/h as 82356 Kamakhya - Pune CST Suvidha Express and covers 2841 km in 51 hrs 45 mins.

== Route and halts ==
- Pune Junction
- Panvel
- Nasik Road
- Bhusaval Junction
- Nagpur Junction
- Gondia Junction
- Durg Junction
- Raipur Junction
- Bilaspur Junction
- Jharsuguda Junction
- Rourkela Junction
- Chakradharpur
- Asansol Junction
- Andal Junction
- Malda Town
- Kishanganj
- New Jalpaiguri Junction
- New Cooch Behar
- New Bongaigaon Junction
- Kamakhya Junction

== Coach composite ==
The train consists of 16 coaches:

- 1 AC II Tier
- 3 AC III Tier
- 6 Sleeper Coaches
- 2 Second-class Luggage/parcel van
- 1 pantry car

== See also ==
- Pune Junction
- Kamakhya Junction
