= Varanasi–New Delhi Vande Bharat Express =

Vande Bharat Express train route in India

Varanasi Junction - New Delhi Vande Bharat Express

Overview
- Service type: Vande Bharat Express
- Locale: Uttar Pradesh and New Delhi
- First service: 18 December 2023 (Inaugural); 20 December 2023; 21 months ago (Commercial)
- Current operator: Northern Railways (NR)

Route
- Termini: Varanasi Junction (BSB); New Delhi (NDLS)
- Stops: 2
- Distance travelled: 755 km (469 mi)
- Average journey time: 08 hrs 05 mins
- Service frequency: Six days a week (Note: Except Tuesdays)
- Train number: 22415 / 22416
- Lines used: Varanasi–Prayagraj line; DDU–Kanpur section; Kanpur–Delhi section

On-board services
- Class(es): AC Chair Car, AC Executive Chair Car
- Seating arrangements: Airline style; Rotatable seats
- Sleeping arrangements: No
- Catering facilities: On board Catering
- Observation facilities: Large windows in all coaches
- Entertainment facilities: On-board WiFi; Infotainment System; Electric outlets; Reading light; Seat Pockets; Bottle Holder; Tray Table
- Baggage facilities: Overhead racks
- Other facilities: Kavach

Technical
- Rolling stock: Vande Bharat 2.0 (Last service: September 15 2024); Vande Bharat 3.0 (First service: September 16 2024)
- Track gauge: Indian gauge 1,676 mm (5 ft 6 in) broad gauge
- Electrification: 25 kV 50 Hz AC Overhead line
- Operating speed: 94 km/h (58 mph) (Avg.)
- Average length: 480 metres (1,570 ft) (20 coaches)
- Track owner: Indian Railways
- Rake maintenance: New Delhi (Shakur Basti DEMU Care Center)

The 22415 / 22416 Varanasi - New Delhi -Varanasi Vande Bharat SF Express is India's 35th Vande Bharat Superfast Express train, connecting the city of Varanasi with the capital city of India, New Delhi. This will be the 2nd Vande Bharat Express train which will run on the New Delhi-Varanasi train line after 15 February 2019.

This Superfast Express train was inaugurated on 18 December 2023 by Prime Minister Narendra Modi from Varanasi's Barki village who was welcomed by Yogi Adityanath, Chief Minister of Uttar Pradesh. It is the fastest train on new delhi Varanasi route

== Overview ==
This train is operated by Indian Railways, connecting Varanasi Jn, Prayagraj (Allahabad) Jn, Kanpur Ctrl and New Delhi. It is currently operated with train numbers 22415/22416 on 6 days a week basis.

== Rakes ==
It is the thirty-third 2nd Generation Vande Bharat Express train which was designed and manufactured by the Integral Coach Factory at Perambur, Chennai under the Make in India Initiative. On September 16th 2024, it was given the new 3rd generation Vande Bharat trainset with 20 coaches.

== Service ==
The 22415/22416 Varanasi Jn - New Delhi Vande Bharat Express operates six days a week except Tuesdays, covering a distance of 759 km (472 mi) in a travel time of 8 hours with an average speed of 94 km/h (58 mph). The service has 2 intermediate stops. The Maximum Permissible Speed is 130 km/h (81 mph).

== See also ==
- New Delhi–Varanasi Vande Bharat Express
- Vande Bharat Express
- Tejas Express
- Gatimaan Express
- Varanasi Junction railway station
- New Delhi railway station

== Notes ==
Namo Bharat train will start on more routes in UP
