= New Delhi – Varanasi Vande Bharat Express =

Vande Bharat Express train route in India

New Delhi – Varanasi Junction Vande Bharat Express

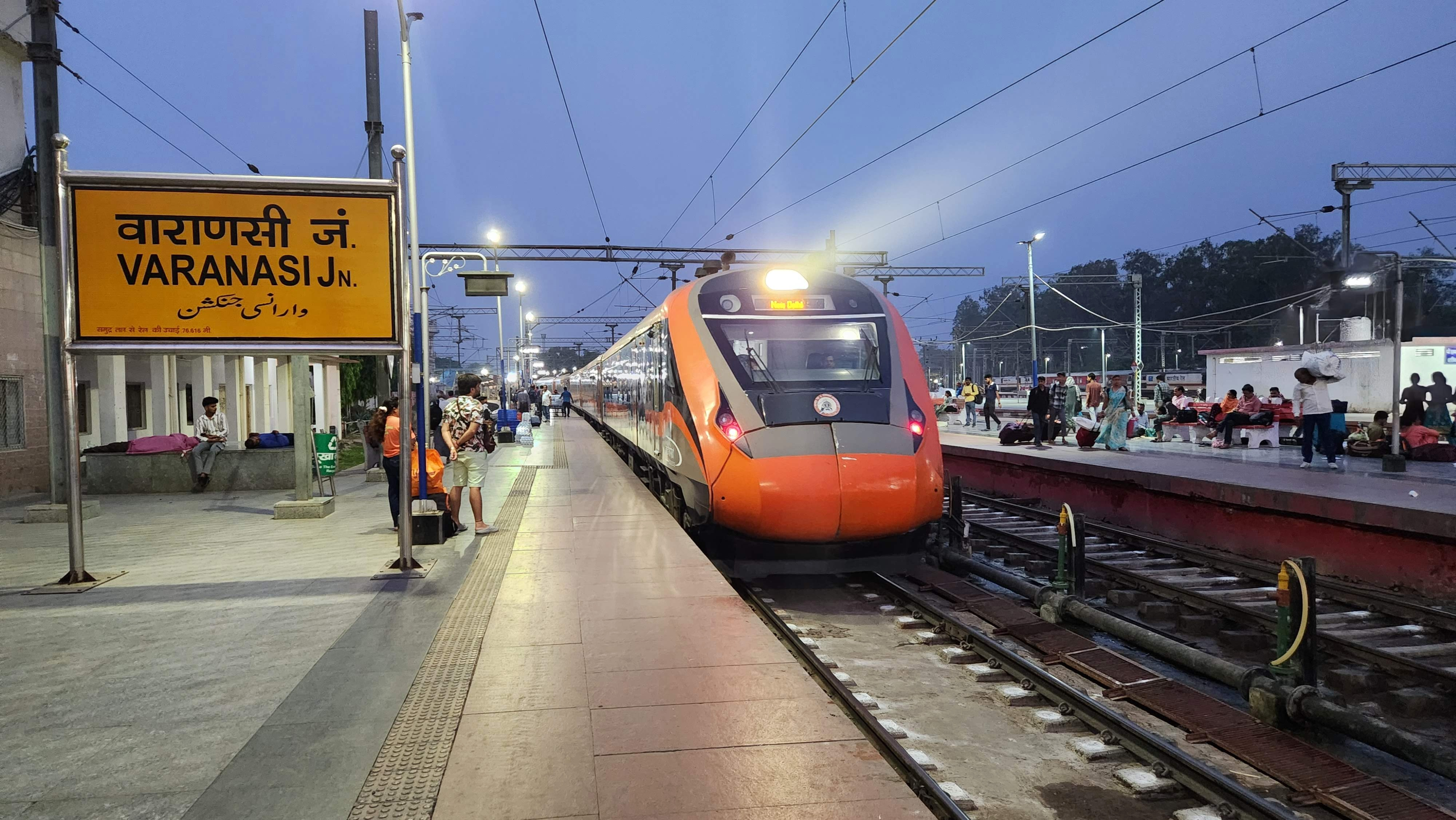
- The Vande Bharat Express operating between Varanasi Junction and New Delhi standing at Varanasi Junction

Overview
- Service type: Vande Bharat Express
- Locale: Delhi and Uttar Pradesh
- First service: 15 February 2019; 7 years ago
- Current operator: Northern Railways (NR)

Route
- Termini: New Delhi (NDLS); Varanasi Junction (BSB)
- Stops: 2
- Distance travelled: 759 km (472 mi)
- Average journey time: 08 hrs
- Service frequency: Six days a week (Note: Except Thursdays)
- Train number: 22436 / 22435
- Lines used: Delhi–Kanpur section; Kanpur–DDU section (till Prayagraj Jn); Prayagraj–Varanasi line (via Gyanpur Road)

On-board services
- Classes: AC chair car, AC executive chair car
- Seating arrangements: Airline style; rotatable seats
- Sleeping arrangements: No
- Auto-rack arrangements: No
- Catering facilities: Yes
- Observation facilities: Large windows
- Entertainment facilities: On-board WiFi; infotainment ystem
- Baggage facilities: Overhead racks

Technical
- Rolling stock: Vande Bharat 1.0; Vande Bharat 2.0 (last service: September 15 2024); Vande Bharat 3.0 (first service: September 16 2024)
- Track gauge: 1,676 mm (5 ft 6 in)
- Electrification: 25 kV 50 Hz AC
- Operating speed: 130 km/h (81 mph)
- Average length: 480 metres (1,570 ft) (20 coaches)
- Track owner: Indian Railways
- Rake maintenance: New Delhi (Shakur Basti DEMU Care Center)
Route map

The 22435 / 22436 New Delhi – Varanasi Jn Vande Bharat Express is India's 1st semi-high speed, electric multiple unit train, connecting the states of New Delhi and Uttar Pradesh.

== Overview ==
This train is operated by Indian Railways, connecting New Delhi, Kanpur Central, Prayagaraj Jn, and Varanasi Jn. It is currently operated with train numbers 22436/22435 on a six-days-a-week basis.

== Rakes ==
Initially the 1st generation Vande Bharat trainset were used. Later they were replaced by the 2nd generation Vande Bharat trainset. On September 16, 2024, it was given the new 3rd generation Vande Bharat trainset, having 20 coaches.

== Service ==
The 22435/22436 Varanasi Jn - New Delhi Vande Bharat Express operates six days a week except Thursdays, covering a distance of 759 km (472 mi) in a travel time of eight hours with an average speed of 95 km/h (59 mph). The service has two intermediate stops. The maximum permissible speed is 130 km/h (81 mph).

Varanasi - New Delhi Vande Bharat Express (22435)
Station	Station code	Arrival	Departure	Halt (min)	Distance (km)	Day
Varanasi Jn	BSB	—N/a	15:00	—N/a	—N/a	1
Prayagraj Jn	PRYJ	16:30	16:32	2	124.2	1
Kanpur Ctrl	CNB	18:30	18:32	2	318.7	1
New Delhi	NDLS	23:00	—N/a	—N/a	759.0	1

New Delhi - Varanasi Vande Bharat Express (22436)
Station	Station Code	Arrival	Departure	Halt (min)	Distance (km)	Day
New Delhi	NDLS	—N/a	06:00	—N/a	—N/a	1
Kanpur Ctrl	CNB	10:08	10:10	2	440.2	1
Prayagraj Jn	PRYJ	12:08	12:10	2	634.7	1
Varanasi Jn	BSB	14:00	—N/a	—N/a	759.0	1

== Incidents ==
A day after the train's launch, it hit a cow when returning from Varanasi. This incident took place at Barhan, 15 km from Tundla in Uttar Pradesh. It was reported as a case of skidding wheels after the train ran over a cow.

== See also ==
- Varanasi–New Delhi Vande Bharat Express
- Vande Bharat Express
- Tejas Express
- Gatimaan Express
- New Delhi railway station
- Varanasi Junction railway station
