= Wagon numbering system in India =

Indian Railways operates India's railway system and comes under the purview of the Ministry of Railways of Government of India. Indian Railways operates more than 4000 cargo and goods trains daily. It hauls variety of cargo to cater to various requirements and have specialized rolling stock corresponding to the cargo hauled. Indian Railways uses a specific wagon numbering system, adopted in 2003.

== Classification ==
Wagons are allocated 11 digit codes for identification. The first two digits indicate the wagon type, the next two digits indicate wagon ownership, the fifth and sixth digits indicate the year of manufacture, the seventh through tenth digits indicate unique wagon number and the last digit is a check digit.

== Wagon type ==
These two digits indicate the type of wagon. There are 243 types of rolling stock used for cargo operations. These include covered wagons, boxcars, flat wagons, flatbeds, open wagons, hoppers, containers, automobile carriers, defense vehicle carriers and tankers.

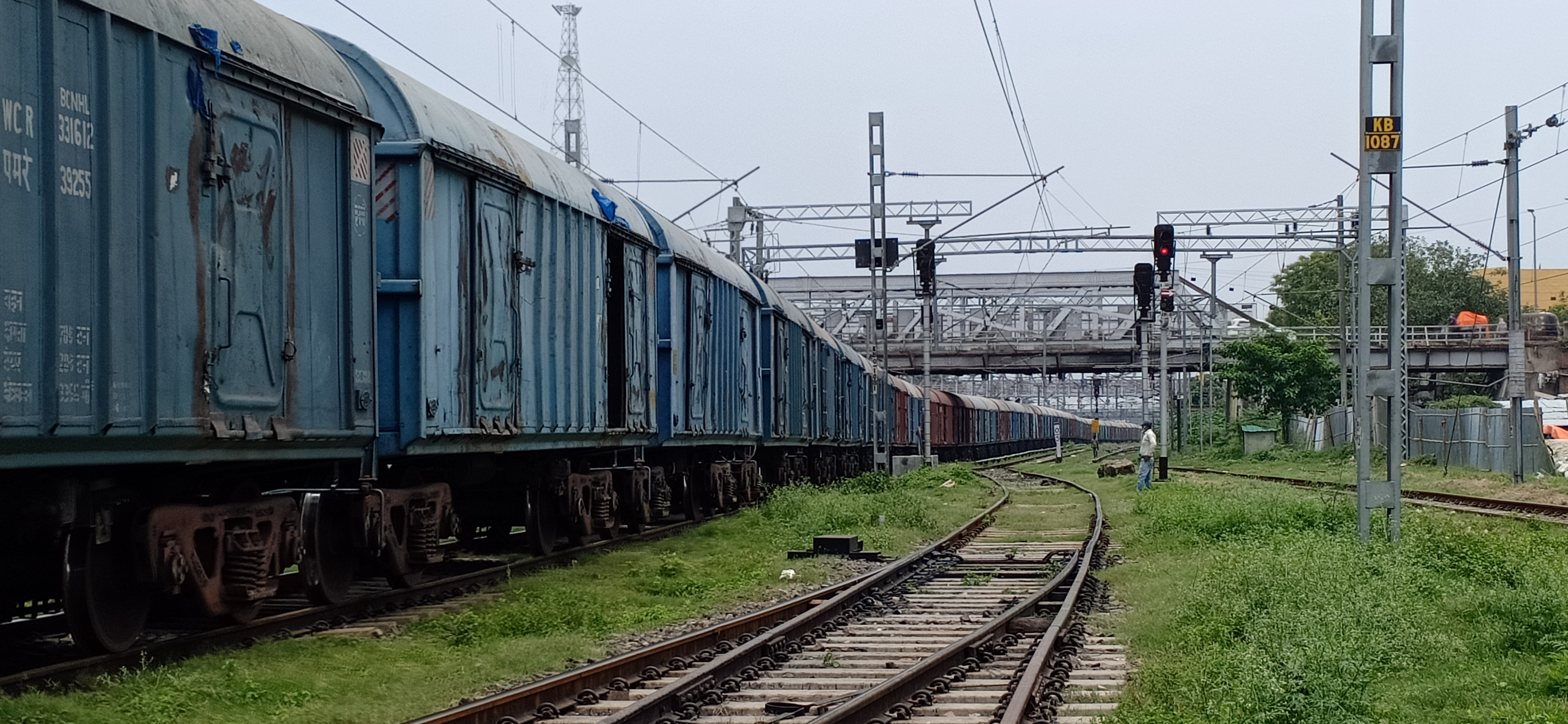
BCNHL class covered wagon

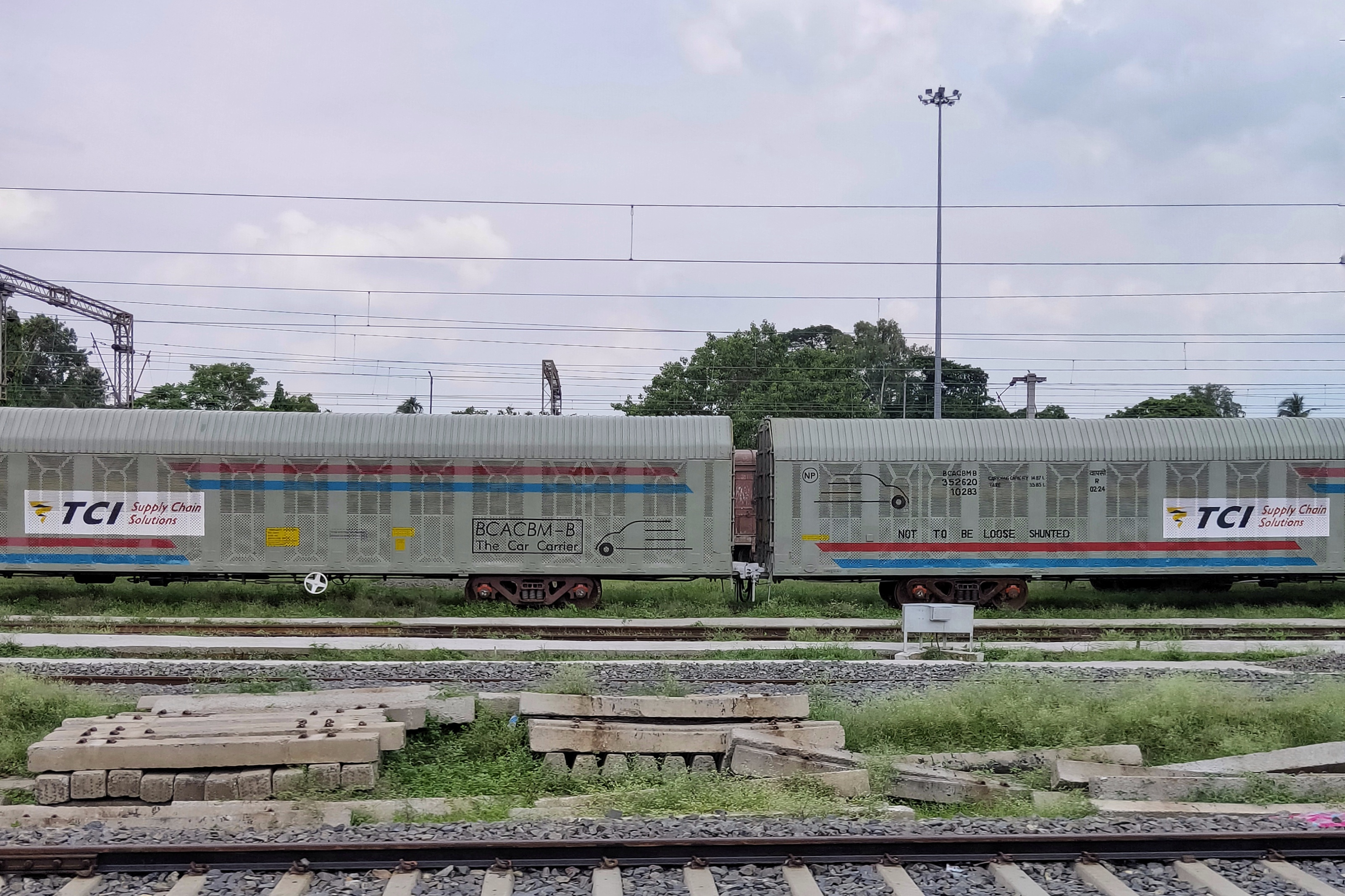
BCACBM class car carrying wagon

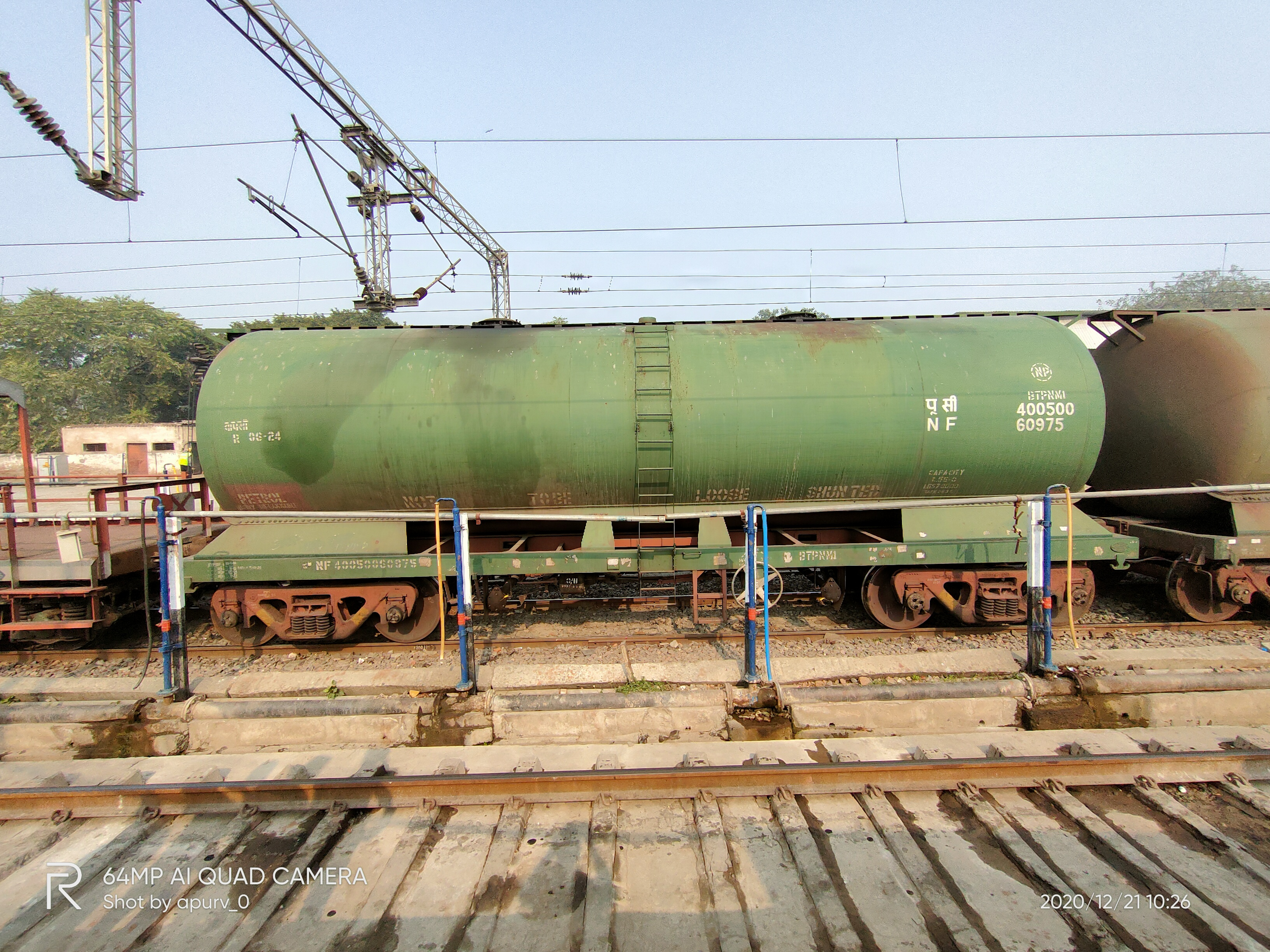
BTPNM class tank wagon

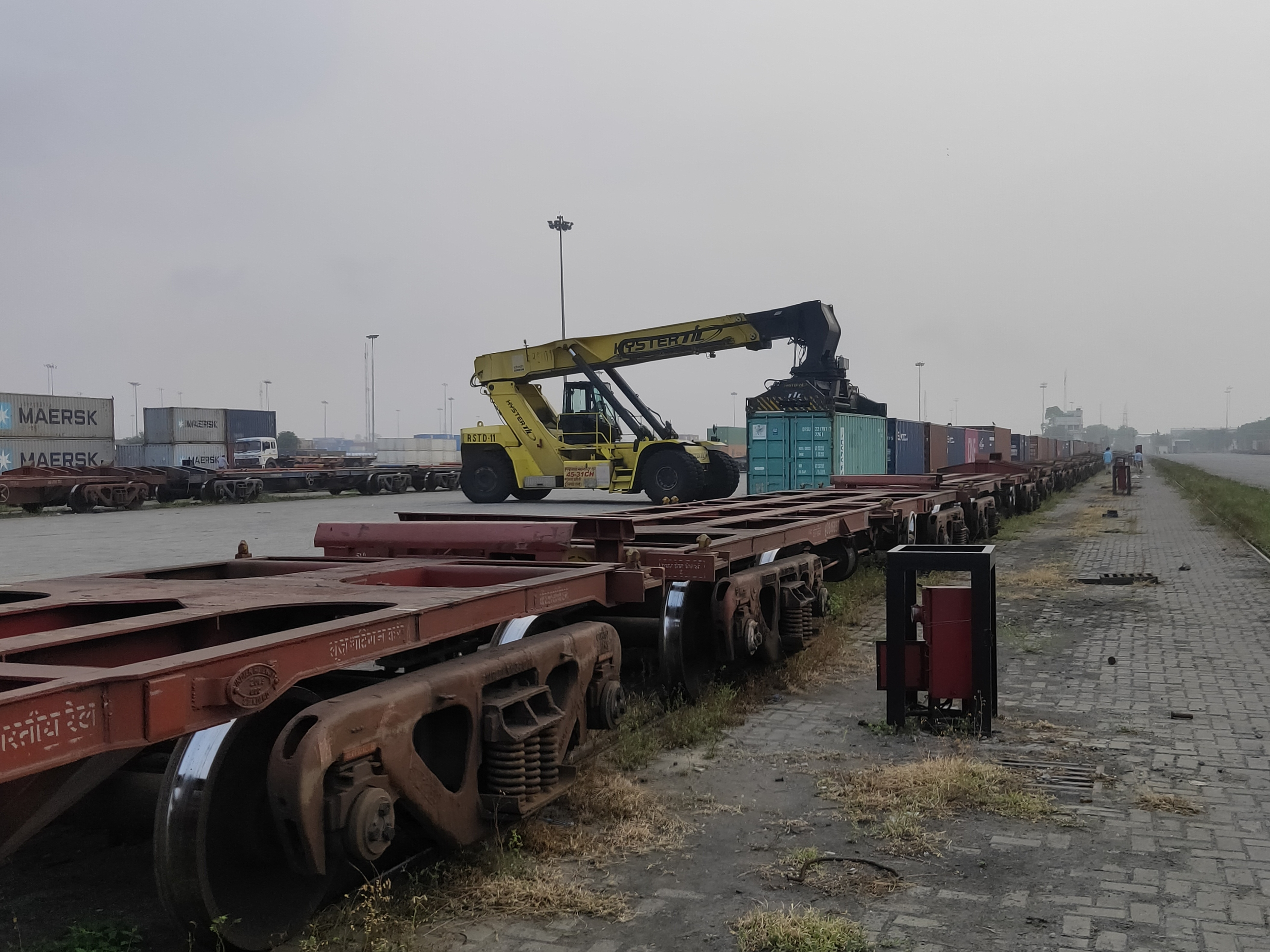
BLC class well wagons

Wagon type classification
Classification	Prefix
Track gauge	B – Broad gauge 1,676 mm (5 ft 6 in); M – Metre gauge 1,000 mm (3 ft 3 3/8 in); N – Narrow gauge 762 mm (2 ft 6 in)
Wagon type	B – Bogie wagon; BV – Brake van; V – Brake/parcel van; O – Open wagon; C – Covered wagon; F – Flat car; FK – Flat car for container transport; FU – Well wagon; LA – Low flat car with standard buffer height; LB – Low flat car with low buffer height; LAB – Low flat car, one end with low buffer, the other with high buffer; R – Rail-carrying wagon; T – Tanker; U – Well wagon; W – Well wagon; K – Open wagon: ballast/material/refuse transport; C – Centre discharge; S – Side discharge; R – Rapid (forced) discharge, bottom discharge; X – Both centre and side discharge; X – High sided; Y – Low (medium) side walls; L – Low sided; H – Heavy load
Coupling	C – Center buffer; R – Screw; T – Transition; N – Air-braked; M – Military

Wagon type code

Open Wagon
Code	10	11	12	13	14	15	16	17	18	19	20	21	22	24
Type	BOXN	BOXNHA	BOXNHS	BOXNCR	BOXNLW	BOXNB	BOXNF	BOXNG	BOY	BOST	BOXNAL	BOSTHS	BOXNHL	BOXNS

Covered Wagon
Code	30	31	32
Type	BCNA	BCNAHS	BCCNR

Tank Wagon
Code	40	41	42	43	44	45	46	47
Type	BTPN	BTPNHS	BTPGLN	BTALN	BTCS	BTPH	BTAP	BTFLN

Flat Wagon
Code	53	54	55	56	57	58	59	60	61	62	63	64	65	66	67	68	69
Type	BLCSA	BLCSB	BRNA	BRNAHS	BFNS	BOMN	BRSTH	BFAT	BLCA	BLCB	BLLA	BLLB	BRS	BFU	BRHNEHS	BCL	BCLA

Hopper Wagon
Code	70	71	72	73	74	75
Type	BOBYN	BOBYNHS	BOBRN	BOBRNHS	BOBRAL	BOBSN

Well Wagon
Code	80	81	82	83
Type	BWTB	MBWT	DBKM	MBWZ

Brake Van
Code	85	86	87
Type	BVZC	BVZI	BVCM

== Wagon ownership ==
These third and fourth digits indicate the wagon ownership. This might correspond to specific railway zone or other entities.

Code	Zone	Abbr.
01	Central Railway	CR
02	Eastern Railway	ER
03	Northern Railway	NR
04	North East Railway	NER
05	Northeast Frontier	NFR
06	Southern	SR
07	South East	SER
08	Western	WR

Code	Zone	Abbr.
09	South Central	SCR
10	East Central	ECR
11	North Western	NWR
12	East Coast	ECoR
13	North Central	NCR
14	South East Central	SECR
15	South Western	SWR
16	West Central	WCR

No.	Zone	Abbr.
24	Ministry of Defence	MoD
25	Container Corporation of India	CONCOR
26	Private	Others

== Year of manufacture ==
These fifth and sixth digits indicate the last two digits of the year of manufacture. For example, a wagon manufactured in 2016 will have a code of 16.

== Individual Wagon number ==
Seventh to tenth digits indicate a unique four-digit individual wagon number. This is a running serial number from 0001 to 9999 with numbers from 0001 to 0999 indicating wagons used by departments of Indian Railways and numbers 1000 to 9999 are for other traffic.

== Check digit ==
The last digit is a check digit, which is calculated using a six-step algorithm as indicated below. Let the first ten digits be represented by C1 to C10 with C1 being the first digit, C2 the second digit and so on.
Step 1 : Starting from the left, add all the characters in the even position. S1 = C2 + C4 + C6 + C8 + C10
Step 2 : Multiply the sum by 3 to get S1 x 3
Step 3 : Starting from the left, add all the Characters in the odd position. S2 = C1 + C3 + C5 + C7 + C9
Step 4 : Add the sum of step 2 to the sum of step 3 to get S4 = S1 x 3 + S2
Step 5 : Round this total up to the next multiple of 10.
Step 6 : The check digit is the number required to the added to round up to the next multiple of 10. If the total is already a multiple of 10, the check digit will be zero.

For example, if the first ten digits are given by 3110169521
Step 1 : S1 = C2 + C4 + C6 + C8 + C10 = 1 + 0 + 6 + 5 + 1 = 13
Step 2 : S1 × 3 = 39
Step 3 : S2 = C1+ C3 + C5 + C7 + C9 = 3 + 1 + 1 + 9 + 2 = 16
Step 4 : S4= S1 × 3 + S2 = 39 + 16 = 55
Step 5 : Next 10th multiple of 55 = 60
Step 6 : Check digit = 60 - 55 = 5
Hence the eleventh digit is assigned as 5 for this particular wagon.
