= Suvidha Express =

Train in India

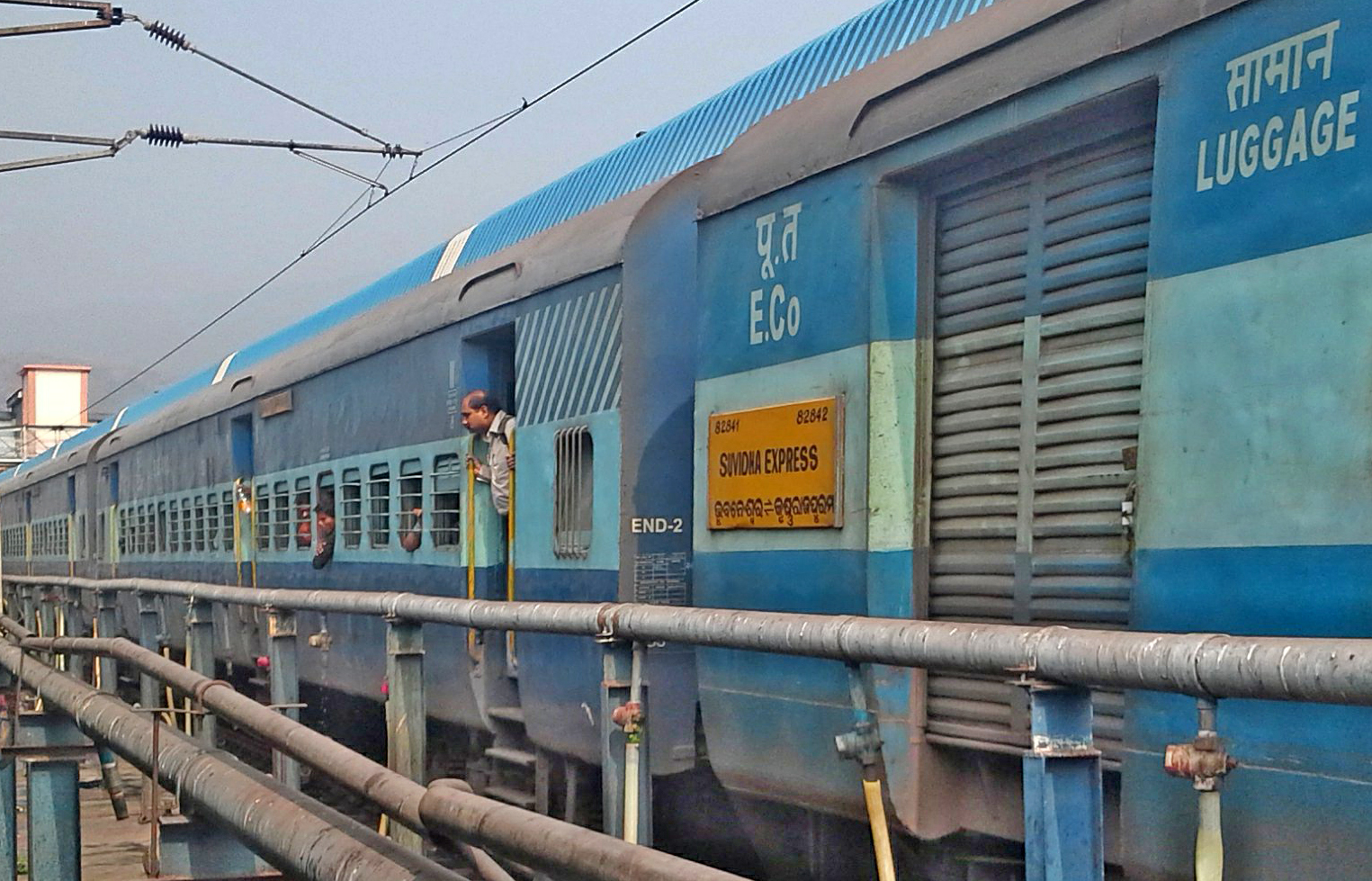

Overview
- Status: Active
- First service: 12 October 2014; 12 years ago

Route
- Line used: ..

The Suvidha Express also called as Premium Express series of trains were introduced by Indian Railways in 2014 for the 1st time which is operated in busiest routes. They were intended to follow dynamic pricing in fares similar to that of airlines contrary to the standard one fare for one class of travel generally followed by Indian Railways. Priority of Premium trains are above Superfast and Mail/Express trains like Shatabdi Express, Duronto Express and Rajdhani Express. At present only 2 services are operated as a regular service.

== Overview ==
The Premium AC special train from Mumbai to Delhi was the first train which was launched on 24 December 2013 during festive season of Christmas and New Year. The train's maiden journey earned 48 percent more than the Mumbai — Delhi Rajdhani that ran during the same period. Encouraged by the successful run of the Mumbai-Delhi premium train, In Railway budget 2014, D. V. Sadananda Gowda, the railway minister announced 5 more such premium AC-special trains on busy routes.

== Features ==
1. Dynamic fare pricing will be followed in this type of train with fare being increased for subsequent bookings.
2. Only a 10–30 days Advance reservation period will be permitted for this train with no agent booking allowed.
3. There will be no provision for waitlisted ticket. Only RAC & Confirmed tickets are permitted to on-board.
4. Tickets will be issued & booking is permitted through IRCTC's website & PRS counters.
5. There will be no quota for ladies/tatkal etc. Only general quota is available & No concession (senior citizen, disabled etc.), modification, upgradation, duplicate ticket, cluster bookings, BPT is permitted in this trains.
6. Identity card details are required at the time of booking tickets.
7. No cancellation is permitted with the only exception being if Indian Railways cancels the train.
8. Vacant seats after charting will be available at the respective current booking counters of the train originating station.

== Numbering ==
As similar to the other trains of Indian Railways, these trains also have five digits. Only change is that, the first digit (from Left) is 8. Example: 82615.

== Traction ==
each trains had their own locomotives like WAP-4, WDM-3D, WDG-4, WDP-4, WAG-5 and WAG-7

== Routes ==
Number	Train Name
82117/82118	Pune Jn - Manduadih(MUV) Pune Suvidha Special Express
82407/82408	Howrah - Anand Vihar Suvidha Special Express
82303/82304	Howrah - Jammu Tawi Suvidha Special Express
82305/82306	Howrah - New Jalpaiguri Suvidha Special Express
82307/82308	Sealdah - Guwahati Suvidha Special Express
82503/82504	Kamakhya - Anand Vihar Suvidha Special Express
82505/82506	Pune - Kamakhya Suvidha Special Express
82601/82602	Chennai Egmore - Tirunelveli Suvidha Special Express
82608/82609	Nagercoil - Chennai Egmore Suvidha Special Express
82635/82636	Chennai Central - Kollam Suvidha Special Express
82632/82633	Ernakulam – Chennai Central Suvidha Special Express
82642/82643	Kochuveli - Guwahati Suvidha Special Express
82651/82652	Yesvantpur - Shri Mata Vaishno Devi Katra Suvidha Express
82801/82802	Howrah - Ernakulam Suvidha Special Express
82831/82832	Sambalpur - Yesvantpur Suvidha Special Express
82853/82854	Visakhapatnam - Villupuram Suvidha Special Express
82901/82902	Mumbai Central New Delhi AC Suvidha Special Express
82907/82908	Mumbai Central - Lucknow Suvidha Special Express
82909/82910	Bandra Terminus - Gorakhpur Suvidha Special Express
82912/82913	Chhapra - Valsad Suvidha Special Express
82507/82508	Visakhapatnam - Subedarganj Suvidha Special Express
82355/82356	Mumbai CSMT - Patna Suvidha Express
82653/82654	Jaipur - Yesvantpur Suvidha Express

== See also ==
- Dedicated Intercity trains of India
- Rajdhani Express
- https://www.irctc.co.in/betaDoc/list%20of%20dynamic%20train%20running%20in%20prod.pdf
