= Locomotives of India =

Indian Railways operates India's railway system and comes under the purview of the Ministry of Railways of Government of India. As of 2025, it maintains over 108,706 km (67,547 mi) of tracks and operates over 15,000 passenger and 10,000 freight trains daily with a fleet of more than 18,000 locomotives. The railways primarily operates a fleet of electric and diesel locomotives along with a few compressed natural gas (CNG) locomotives. Steam locomotives are operated on mountain railways and on heritage trains. As of February 2026, Indian Railways had 13,569 electric and 4,169 diesel locomotives.

== History ==
The history of the Indian Railway began in 1832 with the proposal to construct the first railway line in India at Madras. In 1837, the first train ran on Red Hill railway line between Red Hills and Chintadripet in Madras and was hauled by a rotary steam engine imported from England. In 1852, a steam locomotive imported from England was tried at Byculla. In 1853, the first passenger train ran between Bombay and Thane. It had 14 carriages hauled by three steam locomotives: the Sahib, Sindh and Sultan. In 1877, an Ajmer built F-1/734 steam locomotive became the first indigenously built locomotive in India. In 1925, the first electric train ran between Bombay and Kurla, hauled by a Swiss Locomotive and Machine Works (SLM) 2,400 hp (1,800 kW) electric locomotive on 1500 V DC traction. The first diesel locomotive used in India was fabricated by North British Locomotive Company in 1954. During industrialisation in the colonial era, India also imported approximately 17,420 used locomotive engines from other countries.

Chittaranjan Locomotive Works, commissioned in 1950, was the first locomotive manufacturing unit in India. Banaras Locomotive Works, commissioned in 1961, is the second locomotive manufacturing unit operated by Indian Railways. In the 1960s, Integral Coach Factory-Chennai (ICF) started developing self-propelled electric multiple units for short-haul and local routes. BHEL and Patiala Locomotive Works, established in 1981, also manufacture locomotives in India. In 2015, the first compressed natural gas (CNG) powered trains were rolled out by ICF. In 2018, a semi-high speed self-propelled train-set capable of reaching speeds of over 160 km/h (99 mph) was rolled out from ICF. As of 2025, Indian Railways maintains over 108,706 km (67,547 mi) of tracks and operates over 15,000 passenger and 10,000 freight trains daily with a fleet of over 17,000 locomotives. As of October 2025, Indian Railways had 13,035 electric and 4,165 diesel locomotives amongst others.

Locomotives are classified by track gauge, motive power, function, power rating and model in a four- or five-letter code. The locomotives may be Longer Hood Front (LHF), where the driver cabin is behind the hood of the engine or Short Hood Front (SHF), where the cabin is located towards the front.

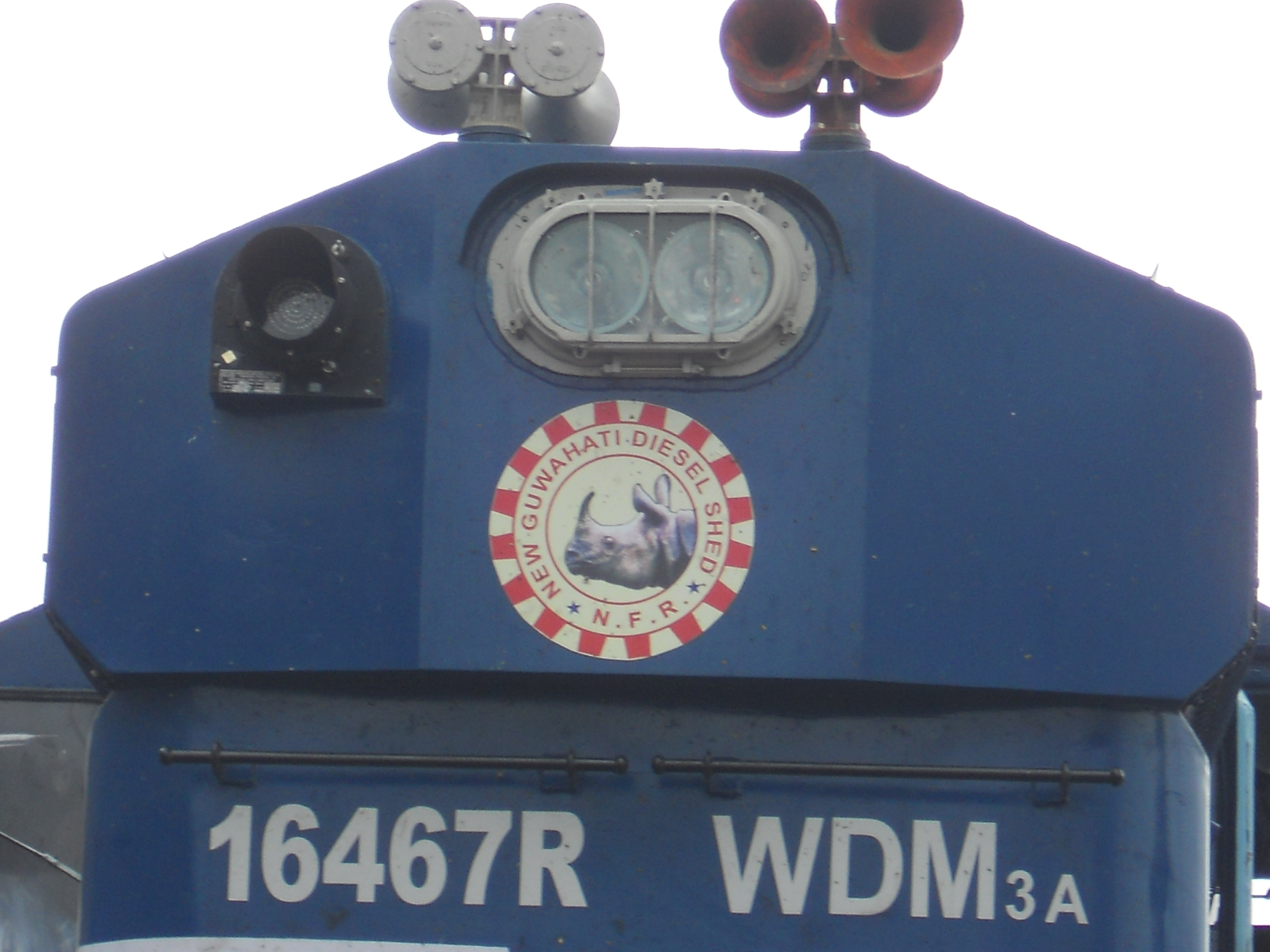
Locomotive classification and number displayed on a locomotive; WDM3A indicates broad gauge (L1), diesel (L2), mixed use (L3), 3100 HP (L4/L5) locomotive

Locomotive classification
Letter position	Denotes	Classification
1	Track gauge	W – Broad gauge 1,676 mm (5 ft 6 in); Y – Metre gauge 1,000 mm (3 ft 3 3/8 in); Z – Narrow gauge 762 mm (2 ft 6 in); N – Narrower gauge 610 mm (2 ft)
2	Motive power	D – Diesel; C – DC electric; A – AC electric; DA – Diesel + electric dual mode (only WDAP5); CA – DC + AC dual electric; B – Battery
3	Use/ load/ traction	G – Goods; P – Passenger; M – Mixed (goods and passenger); S – Shunter; U – Multiple unit; R – Railcar
4	Model/ horsepower	Version number; Model number; Number X 1000 HP
5	Sub-class/ sub-type/ power rating	Increments of 100 HP (for diesel): A – 100 HP; B – 200 HP; C – 300 HP; and so on

== Electric ==
In 1925, the first electric train ran between Bombay and Kurla, hauled by a imported SLM locomotive on a DC traction. In 1927, the first electric locomotive hauled passenger train was pulled by an imported WCP-1. In 1957, Indian Railways adopted 25 kV 50 Hz AC traction with the first runs beginning in December 1959 with the WAM-1 locomotives.

=== Broad-gauge ===
Broad-gauge electric locomotives
Traction	Usage	Name	Image	Manufacturer	Axles	Number built	Production	Power (HP)	Status
WCP series
DC	Passenger	WCP-1		SLM	2-Bo-A1	22	1928–30	2,160 bhp (1,610 kW)	Retired
DC	Passenger	WCP-2		SLM	2-Bo-A1	1	1938	2,160 bhp (1,610 kW)	Retired
DC	Passenger	WCP-3		Hawthorn Leslie	2-Co-2	1	1928	2,250 bhp (1,680 kW)	Retired
DC	Passenger	WCP-4		Hawthorn Leslie, BBC	2-Co-2	1	1928	2,390 bhp (1,780 kW)	Retired
WCM series
DC	Mixed	WCM-1		English Electric	Co-Co	7	1954–55	3,170 bhp (2,360 kW)	Retired
DC	Mixed	WCM-2		English Electric	Co-Co	12	1956–57	2,810 bhp (2,100 kW)	Retired
DC	Mixed	WCM-3		Hitachi	Co-Co	3	1958	2,460 bhp (1,830 kW)	Retired
DC	Mixed	WCM-4		Hitachi	Co-Co	7	1960	3,290 bhp (2,450 kW)	Retired
DC	Mixed	WCM-5		CLW	Co-Co	21	1961–63	3,700 bhp (2,760 kW)	Retired
DC	Mixed	WCM-6		CLW	Co-Co	2	1995	5,000 bhp (3,730 kW)	Retired
WCG series
DC	Goods	WCG-1		SLM	C-C	41	1925–29	2,400 bhp (1,790 kW)	Retired
DC	Goods	WCG-2		CLW	Co-Co	57	1970–76	1,640 bhp (1,220 kW)	Retired
WAM series
AC	Mixed	WAM-1		50 cycles group (Note: Consortium of KraussMaffei, Krupp, SFAC and La Brugeoise et Nivelles)	B-B	100	1959–60	2,870 bhp (2,140 kW)	Retired
AC	Mixed	WAM-2		Mitsubishi	Bo-Bo	36	1960–64	2,760 bhp (2,060 kW)	Retired
AC	Mixed	WAM-3		Mitsubishi	Bo-Bo	2	1964	2,760 bhp (2,060 kW)	Retired
AC	Mixed	WAM-4		CLW	Co-Co	500	1970–83	3,640 bhp (2,710 kW)	Retired
WAP series
AC	Passenger	WAP-1		CLW	Co-Co	65	1980–96	3,760 bhp (2,800 kW)	In service
AC	Passenger	WAP-3		CLW	Co-Co	9	1987–88	3,760 bhp (2,800 kW)	Retired
AC	Passenger	WAP-4		CLW	Co-Co	778	1994–2015	5,000 bhp (3,730 kW)	In service
AC	Passenger	WAP-5		ABB, CLW	Bo-Bo	249	1995–2024	6,000 bhp (4,470 kW)	In service
AC	Passenger	WAP-6		CLW	Co-Co	17	1995–98	5,000 bhp (3,730 kW)	Retired
AC	Passenger	WAP-7		CLW, BLW, PLW	Co-Co	2435	2000–present	6,350 bhp (4,740 kW)	In service
WDAP series
Dual (AC/diesel)	Passenger	WDAP-5		BLW	Co-Co	1	2019–	4,500 bhp (3,360 kW) (diesel); 5,500 bhp (4,100 kW) (AC)	In trials
WAG series
AC	Goods	WAG-1		SNCF, CLW	B-B	112	1963–66	2,900 bhp (2,160 kW)	Retired
AC	Goods	WAG-2		Hitachi, Mitsubishi	B-B	45	1964–65	3,180 bhp (2,370 kW)	Retired
AC	Goods	WAG-3		Henschel, CLW	B-B	10	1965	3,150 bhp (2,350 kW)	Retired
AC	Goods	WAG-4		CLW	B-B	186	1966–69	3,150 bhp (2,350 kW)	Retired
AC	Goods	WAG-5		CLW, BHEL	Co-Co	1196	1984–98	3,900 bhp (2,910 kW)	In service
AC	Goods	WAG-6A		ASEA	Bo-Bo-Bo	6	1987–89	6,000 bhp (4,470 kW)	Retired
AC	Goods	WAG-6B/C		Hitachi	Bo-Bo-Bo	12	1988	6,110 bhp (4,560 kW)	Retired
AC	Goods	WAG-7		CLW	Co-Co	2020	1992–2015	5,000 bhp (3,730 kW)	In service
AC	Goods	WAG-8		BHEL	Co-Co	1	1990	5,000 bhp (3,730 kW)	Retired
AC	Goods	WAG-9		ABB, CLW	Co-Co	89	1996–present	6,000 bhp (4,470 kW)	In service
AC	Goods	WAG-9H/HC/I		CLW, BHEL, BLW, PLW	Co-Co	7618	2006–present	6,000 bhp (4,470 kW)	In service
AC	Goods	WAG-9HH/EF9K		CLW	Co-Co	59	2020–present	9,000 bhp (6,710 kW)	In service
AC	Goods	WAG-9/EF12K		CLW	Co-Co+Co-Co	238	2023–present	12,000 bhp (8,950 kW)	In service
AC	Goods	WAG-10		BLW	Co-Co-Co-Co	1	2018–present	10,000 bhp (7,460 kW)	In service
AC	Goods	WAG-11		BLW	Co-Co-Co-Co	4	2018–present	12,000 bhp (8,950 kW)	In service
AC	Goods	WAG-12		Alstom, ELF	Bo-Bo-Bo-Bo	668	2017–present	12,000 bhp (8,950 kW)	In service
AC	Goods	WAG D-9		Siemens	Co-Co	72	2025–present	9,000 bhp (6,710 kW)	In service
AC	Goods	WCAM series							
Dual (DC/AC)	Mixed	WCAM-1		CLW	Co-Co	54	1975–79	2,930 bhp (2,180 kW) (DC); 3,640 bhp (2,710 kW) (AC)	Retired
Dual (DC/AC)	Mixed	WCAM-2		CLW	Co-Co	20	1995–96	3,780 bhp (2,820 kW) (DC); 4,720 bhp (3,520 kW) (AC)	Retired
Dual (DC/AC)	Mixed	WCAM-3		BHEL	Co-Co	53	1997–98	4,600 bhp (3,430 kW) (DC); 5,000 bhp (3,730 kW) (AC)	Retired
WCAG series
Dual (DC/AC)	Goods	WCAG-1		BHEL	Co-Co	12	1999–2000	4,600 bhp (3,430 kW) (DC); 5,000 bhp (3,730 kW) (AC)	In service

=== Metre-gauge ===
Metre-gauge electric locomotives
Traction	Usage	Name	Image	Manufacturer	Axles	Number built	Production	Power (|HP)	Status
DC	Goods	YCG-1		English Electric	Bo-Bo	4	1930	640 bhp (477 kW)	Retired
AC	Mixed	YAM-1		Mitsubishi	B-B	20	1964–66	1,740 bhp (1,300 kW)	Retired

=== Electric multiple units ===
In 1925, the electric multiple units (EMU) introduced in Bombay were 1.5KV DC units imported from Cammell Laird and Uerdingenwagonfabrik. In the 1960s, EMUs were developed by Integral Coach Factory (ICF) in Chennai. Indian Railways uses multiple DC units in operation in several suburban sections which are classified from WCU-1 through WCU-15. BHEL developed AC-DC dual use EMUs which can run on 25kV AC and 1.5kV DC traction lines. In the late 1990s, MEMUs were developed which ran on 25KV AC power. AC electric multiple units are designated WAU-1 to WAU-4. In 2019, ICF rolled out three-phase AC units to replace conventional DC units.

== Diesel ==
In 1954, the first diesel locomotive was used in India, which was manufactured by North British Locomotive Company. In 1958, WDM-1, the first locomotive used for mainline traffic, was imported from ALCO. In 1964, the first broad-gauge WDM-2 diesel locomotive was rolled out by Banaras Locomotive Works.

=== Broad-gauge ===
Broad-gauge diesel locomotives
Usage	Name	Numbers	Image	Manufacturer	Axles	Number built	Production	Power (HP)	Status
WDM series
Mixed	WDM-1	17000-17099		ALCO	Co-Co	100	1957–59	1,950 bhp (1,450 kW)	Retired
Mixed	WDM-2	16000-16887, 17100-17999, 18040-18079, 18112-18514, 18523-18900, 18903-18999		ALCO, BLW	Co-Co	2700	1962–98	2,600 bhp (1,940 kW)	Retired
Mixed	WDM-2G	80000,80001		PLW	Co-Co	2	2013	2,400 bhp (1,790 kW)	Retired
Mixed	WDM-3	18515-18522		Henschel	Bo-Bo	8	1970	2,500 bhp (1,860 kW)	Retired
Mixed	WDM-3A	13xxx, 14001-14057, 14058-14143, 16000-		BLW	Co-Co	1431	1994–98	3,100 bhp (2,310 kW)	In service
Mixed	WDM-3D	11101 - 11590		BLW	Co-Co	500	2003–13	3,300 bhp (2,460 kW)	In service
Mixed	WDM-4	18000-039, 18080-18111		GM	Co-Co	72	1962	2,600 bhp (1,940 kW)	Retired
Mixed	WDM-6	18901,18902		BLW	Bo-Bo	2	1981–82	1,350 bhp (1,010 kW)	Retired
Mixed	WDM-7	11001-11015		BLW	Co-Co	15	1987–89	2,000 bhp (1,490 kW)	Retired
WDP series
Passenger	WDP-1	15001-15069		BLW, ALCO	Bo-Bo	69	1995–99	2,300 bhp (1,720 kW)	In service
Passenger	WDP-3A	15501-15544		BLW, ALCO	Co-Co	44	1998–2002	3,100 bhp (2,310 kW)	In service
Passenger	WDP-4	20000-20103, 40001-40608		EMD, BLW	Co-Co	711	2002–18	4,000 bhp (2,980 kW)	In service
WDG series
Goods	WDG-2/3A	14501-14999, 13000-13665		BLW	Co-Co	2004	1995–2010	3,100 bhp (2,310 kW)	In service
Goods	WDG-4	12001-12999, 70001-70190		EMD, BLW	Co-Co	1188	1999–2018	4,500 bhp (3,360 kW)	In service
Goods	WDG-4D	70301-70882, 12681		BLW	Co-Co	583	2012–2018	4,500 bhp (3,360 kW)	In service
Goods	WDG-4G	49001-49700		GE, DLF	Co-Co	606	2017–present	4,500 bhp (3,360 kW)	In service
Goods	WDG-5	50001-50007		BLW	Co-Co	7	2012–17	5,500 bhp (4,100 kW)	In service
Goods	WDG-6G	69001-69300	Gandhidham based WDG-6G at Ghaziabad outer station area	GE, DLF	Co-Co	223	2018–present	6,000 bhp (4,470 kW)	In service
WDS series
Shunter	WDS-1	19000-19014		GE	Bo-Bo	15	1944–45	386 bhp (288 kW)	Retired
Shunter	WDS-2	19016-19045		Krauss-Maffei	C	30	1954–55	440 bhp (328 kW)	Retired
Shunter	WDS-3	19046-19052		Maschinenbau Kiel	C	7	1961	618 bhp (461 kW)	Retired
Shunter	WDS-4	19057-19732		CLW	C	662	1968–97	600–700 bhp (450–520 kW)	Retired
Shunter	WDS-5	19087-19107		ALCO, BLW	Co-Co	21	1967	1,065 bhp (794 kW)	Retired
Shunter	WDS-6			BLW	Co-Co	270	1975–present	1,400 bhp (1,040 kW)	In service
Shunter	WDS-8			CLW	Bo-Bo	5	1979–82	800 bhp (597 kW)	Retired

In 2009, a YDM-4 locomotive was converted to a broad gauge shunter by Golden Rock Railway Workshop, codenamed WCDS-6, with C for "converted", and delivered to RITES.

=== Metre-gauge ===
Metre-gauge diesel locomotives
Usage	Name	Image	Manufacturer	Axles	Number built	Production	Power (HP)	Status
YDM series
Mixed	YDM-1		NBL	B-B	20	1955–56	700 bhp (522 kW)	Retired
Mixed	YDM-2		CLW	B-B	41	1986–90	700 bhp (522 kW)	Retired
Mixed	YDM-3		EMD	B-B	30	1961–62	1,390 bhp (1,040 kW)	Retired
Mixed	YDM-4		ALCO, BLW	Co-Co	541	1961–93	1,400 bhp (1,040 kW)	In service
Mixed	YDM-5		GM	C-C	25	1964	1,390 bhp (1,040 kW)	Retired

=== 2 ft 6 in (762 mm) gauge ===
2 ft 6 in (762 mm) gauge diesel locomotives
Usage	Name	Image	Manufacturer	Axles	Number built	Production	Power (HP)	Status
ZDM series
Mixed	ZDM-1		Arnold Jung	B-B	5	1955	290 bhp (216 kW)	Retired
Mixed	ZDM-2		Maschinenbau Kiel	B-B	25	1964–65	700 bhp (522 kW)	Retired
Mixed	ZDM-3		CLW	B-B	40	1970–82	700 bhp (522 kW)	In service
Mixed	ZDM-4		CLW	1-B-B-1	49	1975–90	700 bhp (522 kW)	In service
Mixed	ZDM-5		CLW	B-B	41	1989	450 bhp (336 kW)	In service

=== 2 ft (610 mm) gauge ===
2 ft (610 mm) gauge diesel locomotives
Usage	Name	Image	Manufacturer	Axles	Number built	Production	Power (HP)	Status
NDM series
Mixed	NDM-1		Arnold Jung	B-B	7	1955	290 bhp (216 kW)	In service
Mixed	NDM-5		CLW	B-B	11	1987–89	450 bhp (336 kW)	In service
Mixed	NDM-6		SAN	B	6	1997	335 bhp (250 kW)	In service

=== Diesel railcars and multiple units ===
In 1958, Commonwealth Engineering of Australia supplied an unknown number of 400 hp (300 kW), 83-seat broad-gauge diesel-mechanical railcars to Indian Railways, classified as WRD-1. Powered by a pair of 200 hp Leyland engines, it had an axle arrangement of 1A-1A1, and a top speed of 110 km/h (68 mph).

In 1993-94, diesel multiple units (DMU) were introduced into service. Depending on their transmission system, they are classified as DEMU (diesel-electric transmission) or DHMU (diesel-hydraulic transmission). With the increase in electrification, DEMUS have been replaced by MEMUs in stages.

== Steam ==
=== Broad-gauge ===
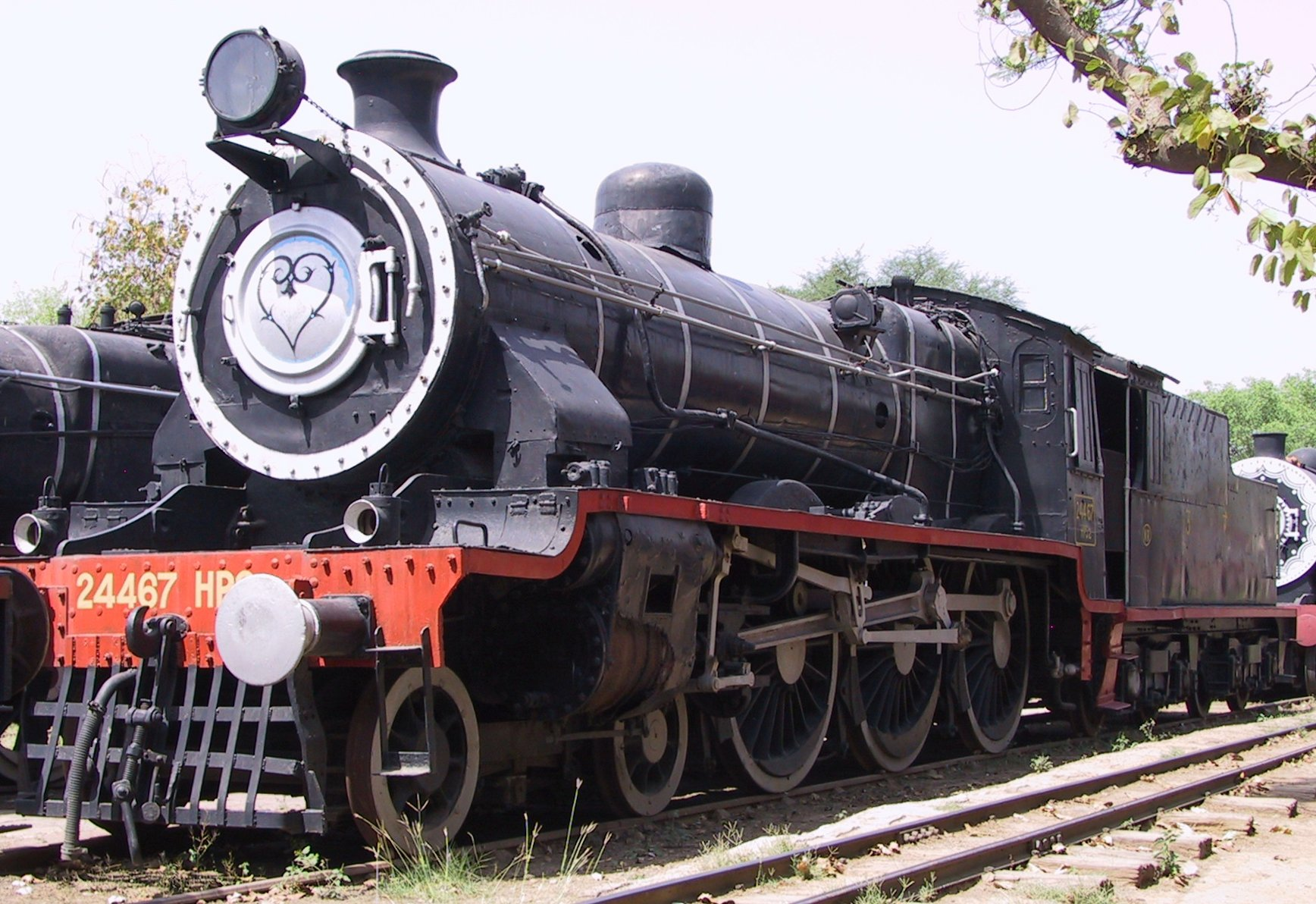
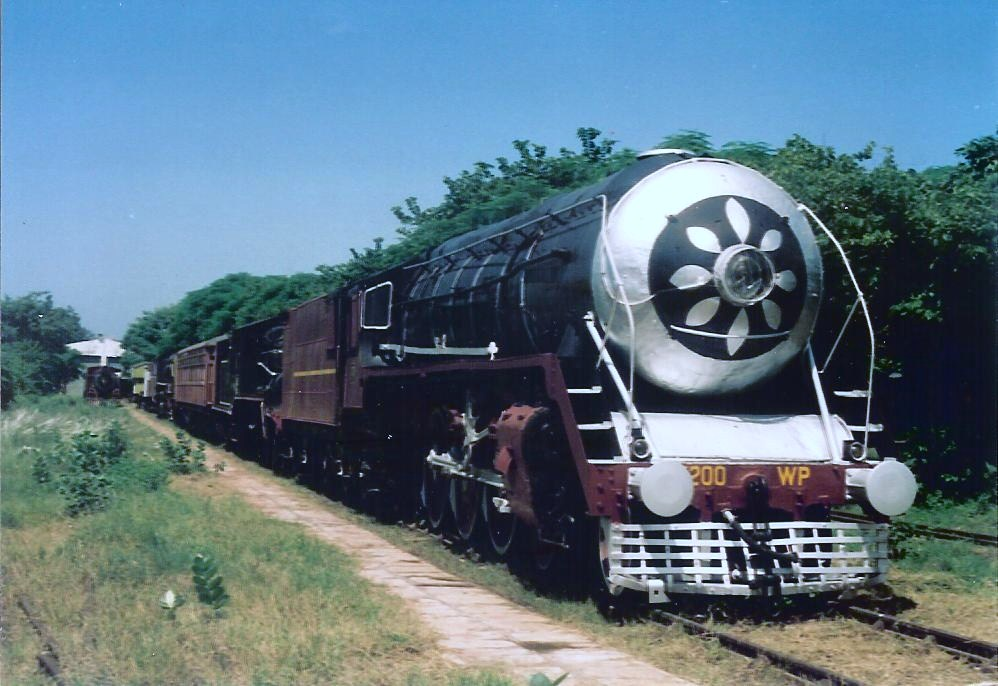
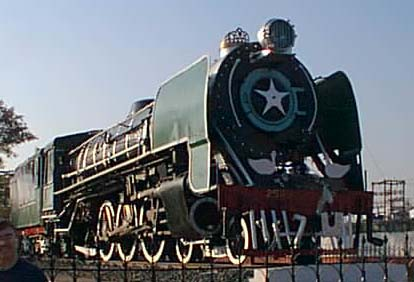
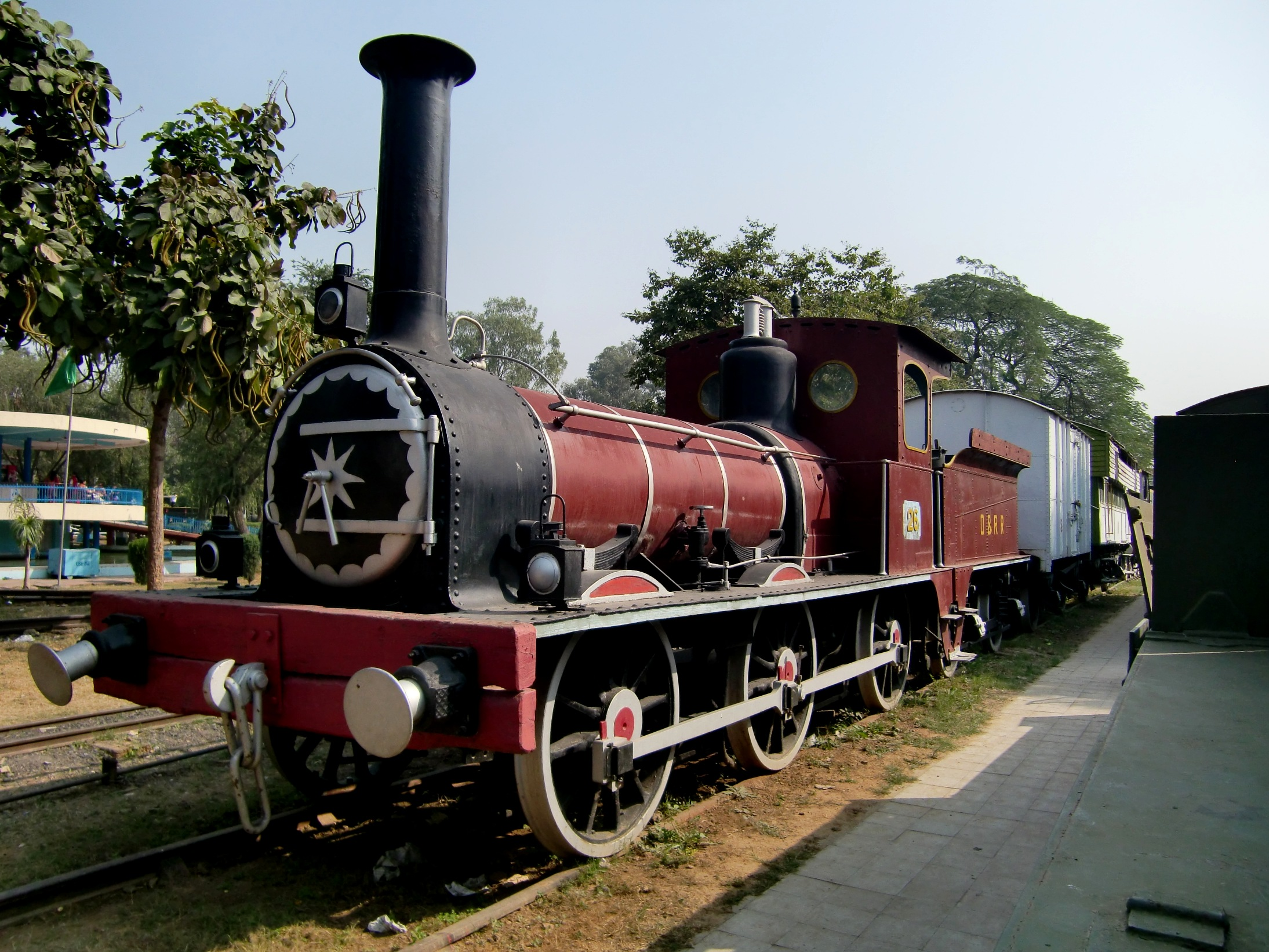
Indian Railways locomotives (clockwise from upper left): HPS, NRM WP 7200, B-26 and YP-class

In the 19th century, the railway companies ordered custom-built steam locomotives, usually from British manufacturers. With non-standardized and multiple designs, manufacturing cost was high and production was slow. During the 1890s, Indian railway companies imported locomotives from Germany and the United States when British manufacturers were suffering from work outages. The locomotives used included:

- Bengal Nagpur Railway:
  - Class F: 0-6-0
  - Class GM: 2-6-0 (probably modified)
  - BNR class HSG: 2-8-0+0-8-2 Garratt locomotive, first Garratt locomotive
  - Class M: 4-6-2 (probably modified)
  - BNR class N: 4-8-0+0-8-4 Garratt, India's largest locomotive; One is preserved at the National Rail Museum, New Delhi
  - BNR class NM: Ten were built in 1931 by Beyer, Peacock & Company; withdrawn in the late 1960s
  - BNR class P: 4-8-2+2-8-4 Garratt, four were built by Beyer, Peacock & Company in 1939; withdrawn in the early 1970s
- Bombay, Baroda & Central India Railway:
  - BB&CI class P: 4-6-2
  - Class A: 2-4-0T, an Atlantic; was at the Palej shed
  - Class U36: 0-4-2, used on hauling suburban trains in Bombay
  - Class D1: 4-4-0, one was named Princess May
  - Class M: 4-6-2
- East Indian Railway Company:
  - Class CT: 0-6-4T, converted to a superheater
  - EIR class G: 2-2-2T, first two named Express and Fairy Queen; built in 1855, the latter is the world's oldest locomotive to be in working order and was rebuilt by ICF; housed at East Indian Railway (EIR)
  - EIR class P: 4-6-0
- Great Indian Peninsula Railway:
  - Sultan, Sahib and Sindh: hauled the first passenger train in 1853
  - Lord Falkland: 0-6-0
  - GIPR classes Y1, Y2, Y3, and Y4: 0-8-4T, used on Thal Ghat as bankers for pushing trains up the Western Ghats
  - GIPR Class F and F3: 2-6-0
  - GIPR class J1: 0-6-0
  - Class D4: 4-6-0, one is named Hero
  - Class D5: 4-6-0 passenger locomotive
  - Class E1: 4-4-2 Atlantic built by the North British Locomotive Company in 1907–8; rebuilt with a superheater between 1925 and 1928
  - Class T: Tank locomotive used for hauling Mumbai suburban trains
  - Class Y: 2-8-4T
  - Crane tank: 0-6-0T, one is preserved at the National Rail Museum in New Delhi
- Madras and Southern Mahratta Railway:
  - M&SM class V: 4-4-0, one is preserved
  - Class BTC: 2-6-4T, based on BESA specifications
  - Class T: 0-4-2; one is preserved in Chennai
- Nizam's Guaranteed State Railway:
  - NSR class A: 2-6-0T, No. 48, an Atlantic preserved at the National Rail Museum, Delhi
- North Western State Railway:
  - Class EM: 4-4-2, one is preserved at the National Rail Museum
  - NWR class GAS: 2-6-2+2-6-2 Garratt, one built in 1925 and retired in 1937
  - NWR class P: 2-4-0
  - Class E1: 4-4-2
  - Class N1: 4-8-0
- Oudh and Rohilkhand Railway:
  - Class B26: 0-6-0, one is preserved at the National Rail Museum
- Others:
  - Class B: 2-6-0
  - Class E: 2-4-0
  - Class F: 2-8-2, built between 1926 and 1950 by Nasmyth Wilson for service on Central Railway (CR)
  - Class G: 2-6-0, probably intended for freight
  - Class NA2
  - Class PTC: 2-6-4T, owned by Northern Railway (NR); probably a converted passenger locomotive
  - Class Y2: 2-8-2T, reclassified L2
  - Phoenix: 0-4-0T, one is at the National Rail Museum
  - Ramgotty: 2-2-0T, the National Rail Museum's oldest locomotive, it was converted to broad gauge

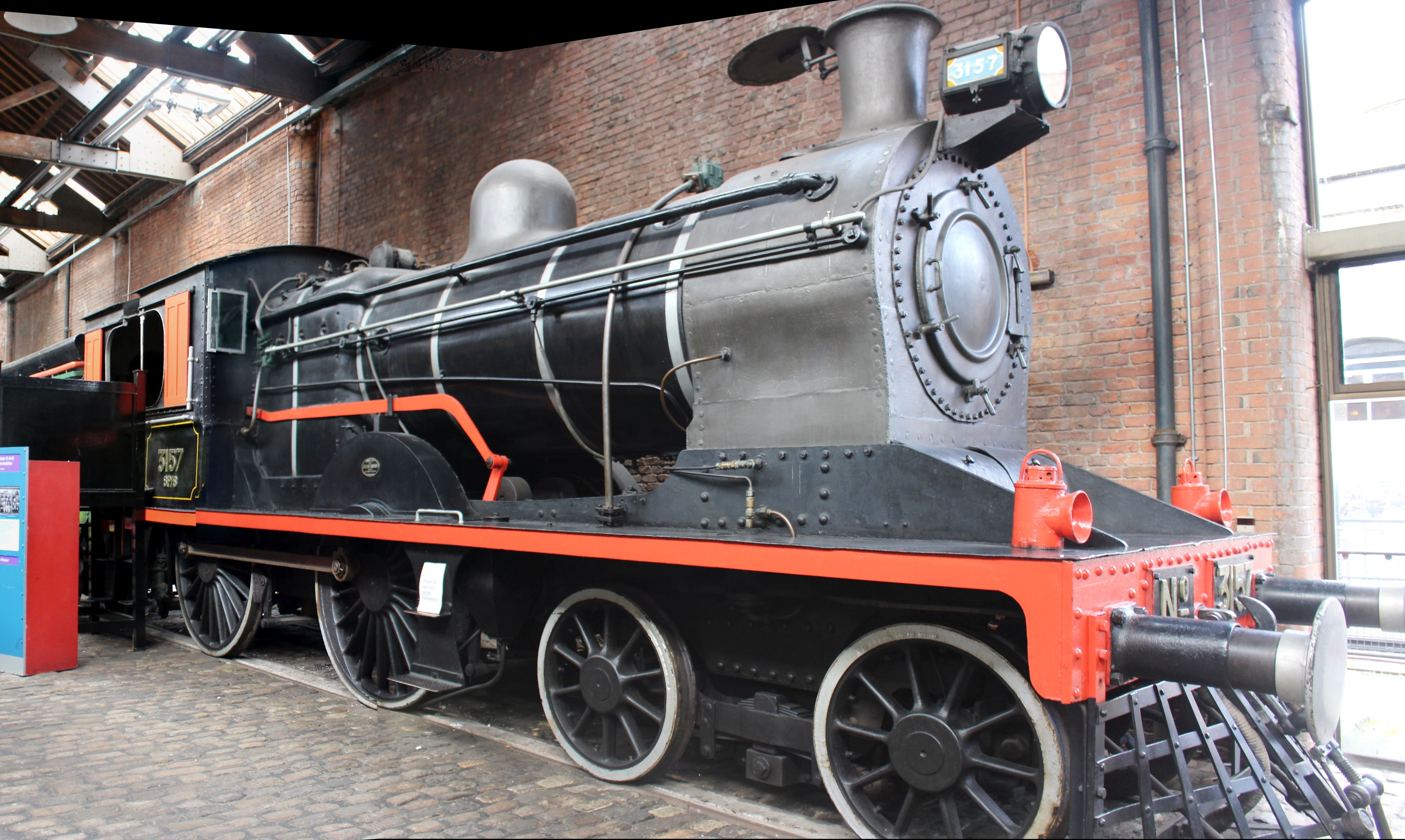
Vulcan Foundry class SPS, 1911

In the early 1900s, the British Engineering Standards Committee (later the British Engineering Standards Association) began designing a series of locomotives for use by Indian railways. The first two designs emerged in 1903: a 4-4-0 passenger and 0-6-0 goods. They were revised in 1905 and 1906 with additional heavier, more-powerful locomotives:

- Class SP: Standard passenger (4-4-0)
- Class SG: Standard goods (0-6-0)
- Class PT: Passenger tank (2-6-4T)
- Class HP: Heavy passenger (4-6-0)
- Class AP: Atlantic passenger (4-4-2)
- Class HG: Heavy goods (2-8-0)
- Class HT: Heavy tank (2-8-2T)

These advisory BESA designs were customized by the railway companies, which used different classification systems; only the state-operated railways used the class designations SP, SG, PT, HP, AP, HG and HT. When superheating was accepted, superheated versions were classified SPS, SGS and so on (if built with superheaters) and SPC, SGC and so on (if converted from saturated to superheated).

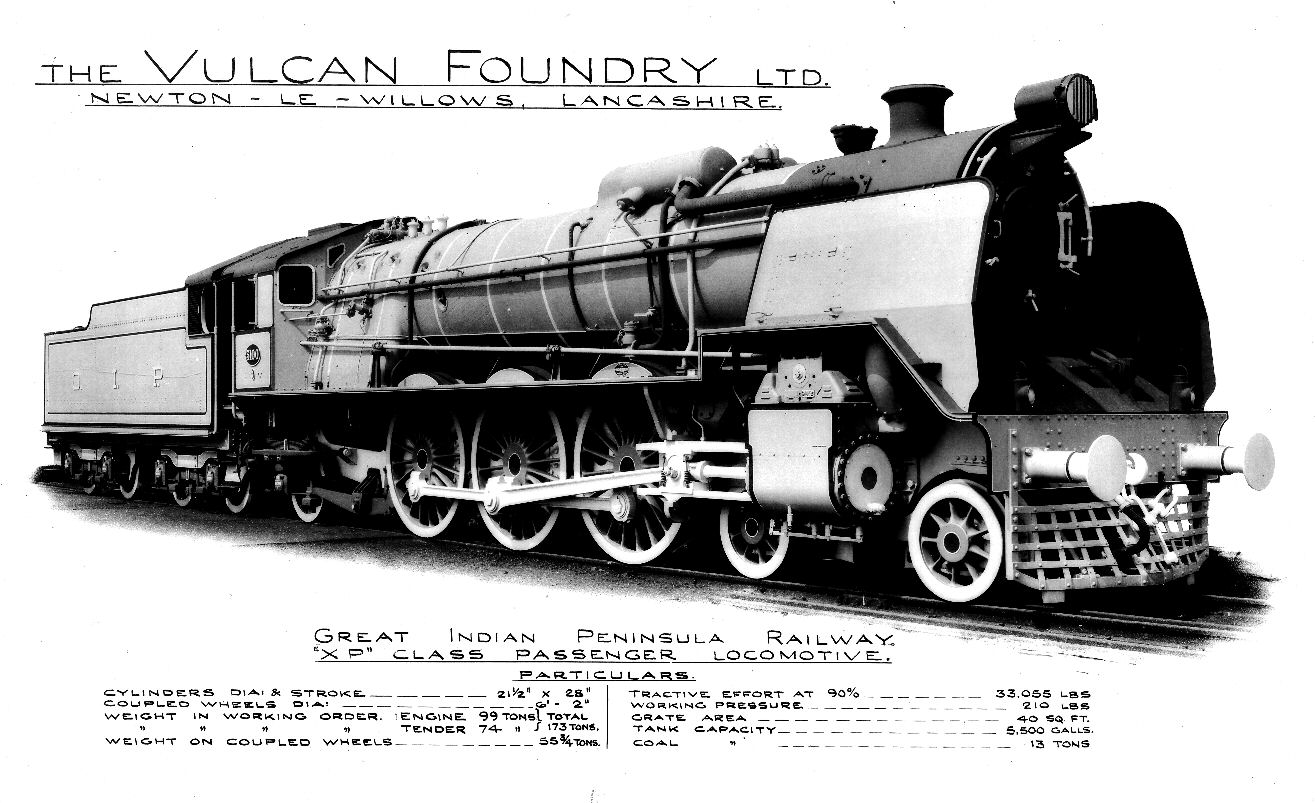
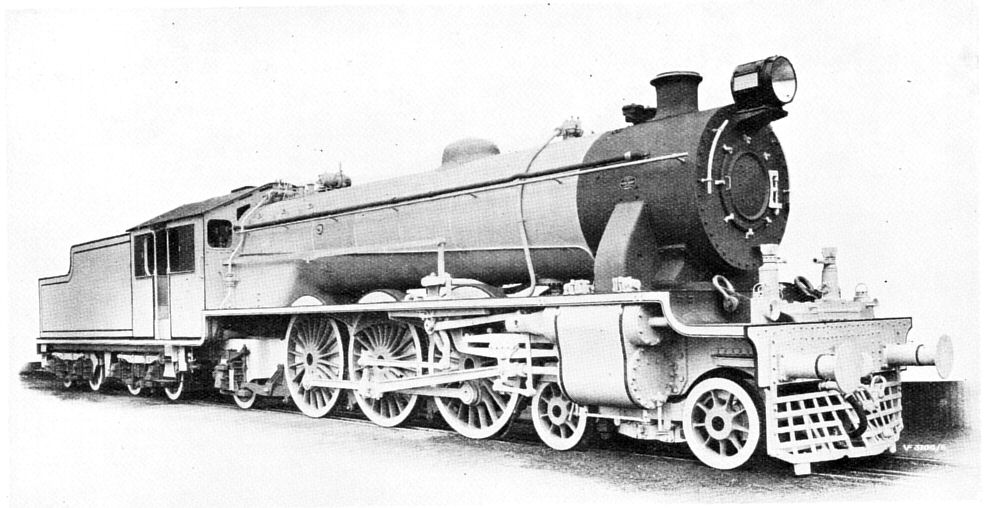
Indian Railways locomotives: 1935 XP class (left) and 1927 XB class

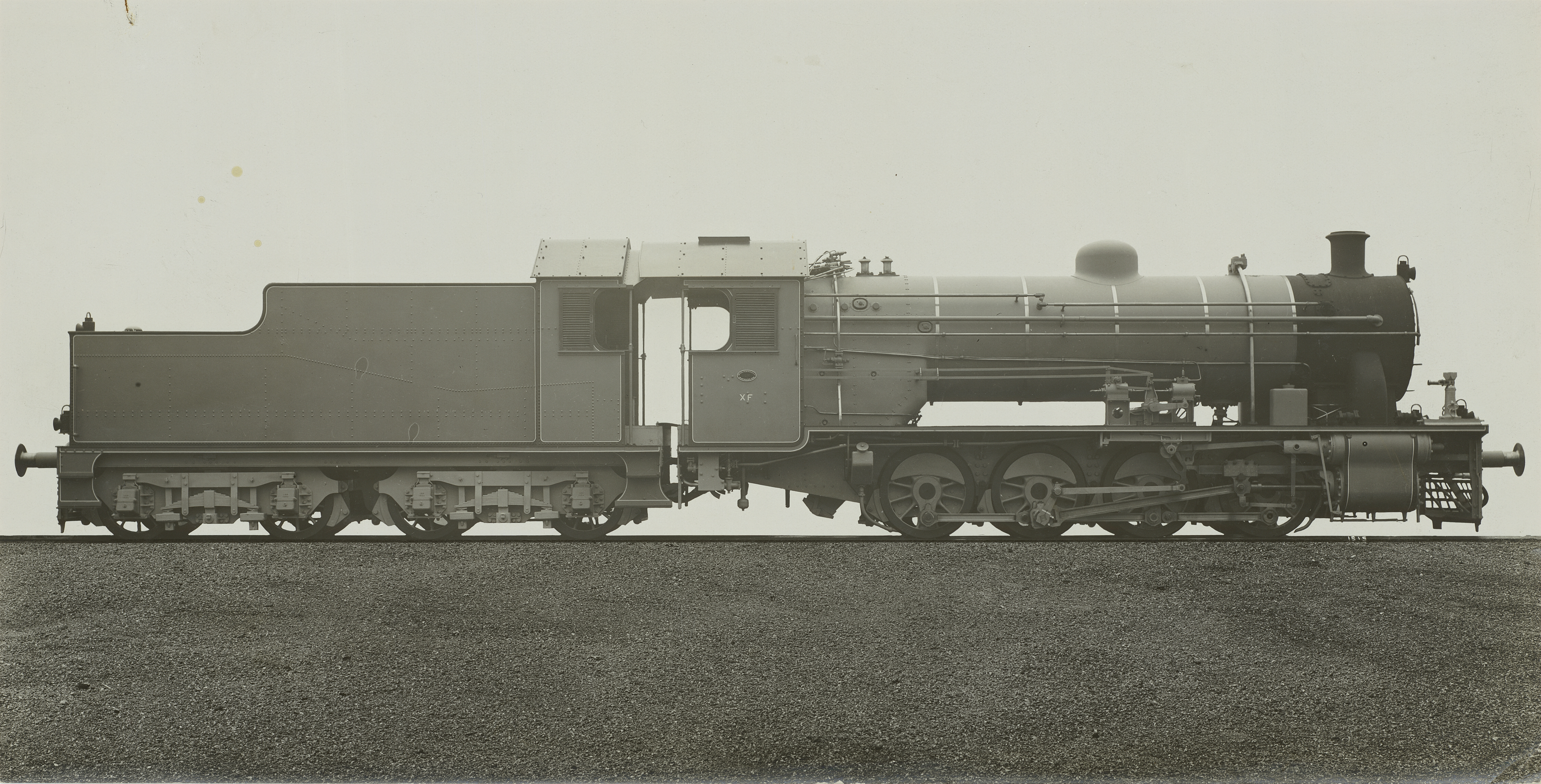
Class XF, built by Beyer, Peacock & Company in Manchester for East Bengal Railway

After World War I, larger and more-powerful locomotives were designed by British consulting engineers for the Indian government. They began to operate from 1927:

- Class XA: branch passenger 4-6-2 design, 12.5-ton axle load
- Class XB: light passenger 4-6-2 design, 17-ton axle load
- Class XC: heavy passenger 4-6-2 design, 19.5-ton axle load
- Class XD: Light goods 2-8-2 design, 17-ton axle load
- Class XE: heavy goods 2-8-2 design, 22.5-ton axle load
- Class XF: light shunting 0-8-0 design, 18-ton axle load
- Class XG: heavy shunting 0-8-0 design, 23-ton axle load
- Class XH: 4-cylinder 2-8-2, 28-ton axle load; none were built
- Class XP: experimental passenger 4-6-2, 18.5-ton axle load
- Class XS: experimental 4-cylinder 4-6-2, 21.5-ton axle load
- Class XT: light tank 0-4-2T, 15-ton axle load

During World War II, large numbers of 2-8-2 locomotives were acquired from the United States and Canada and classified AWD and CWD. The Baldwin Locomotive Works adapted the USATC S160 Class locomotive design for India, and it became class AWC. Sixty broad-gauge locomotives were built in 1944 as part of an order of 180 S160 engines. In addition to modified frame spreaders, axles, cylinders, and cab, the Indian locomotives had a turbo generator and electric lighting (not included in the standard European design). Many parts (including boilers) were identical to those in standard-gauge locomotives.

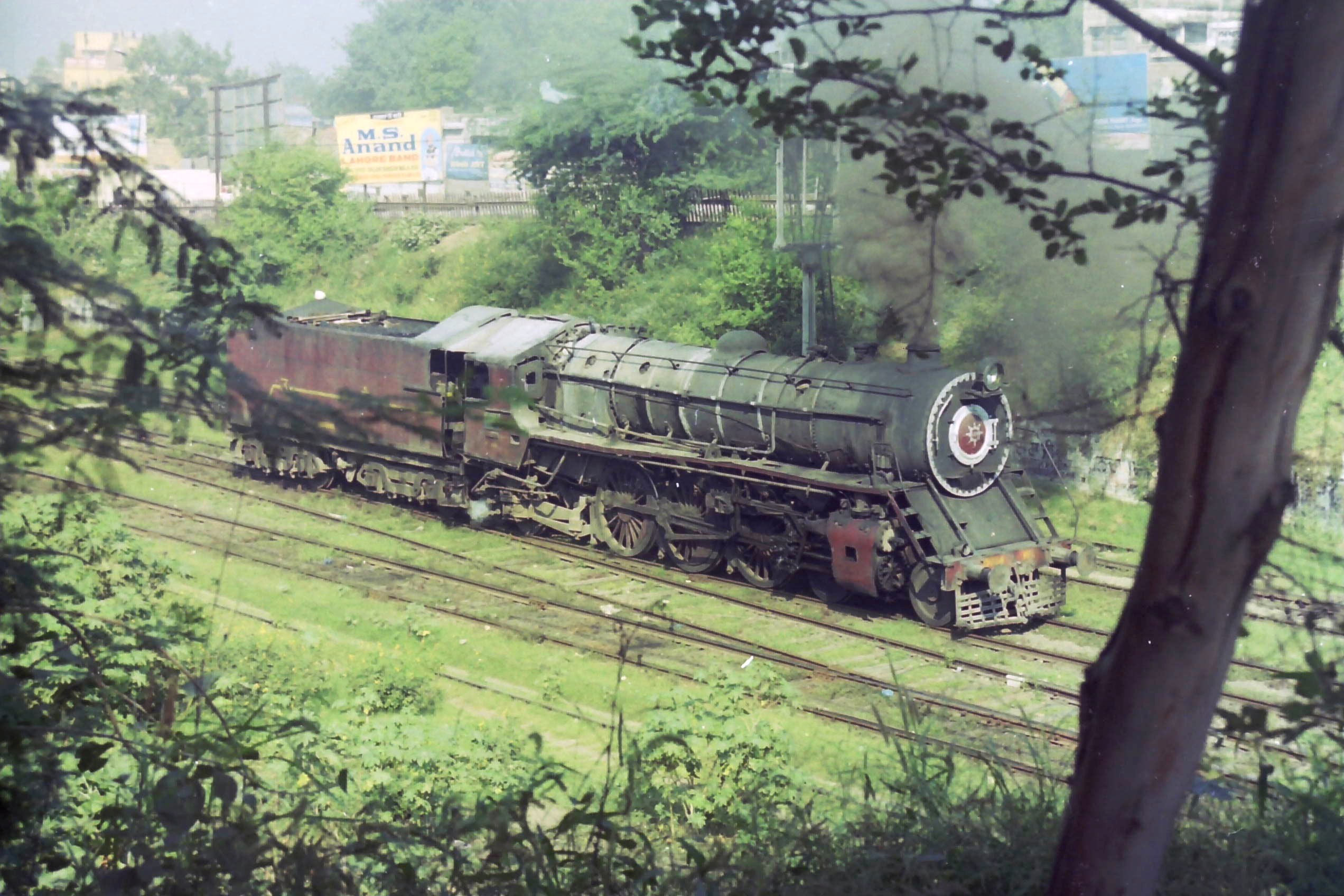
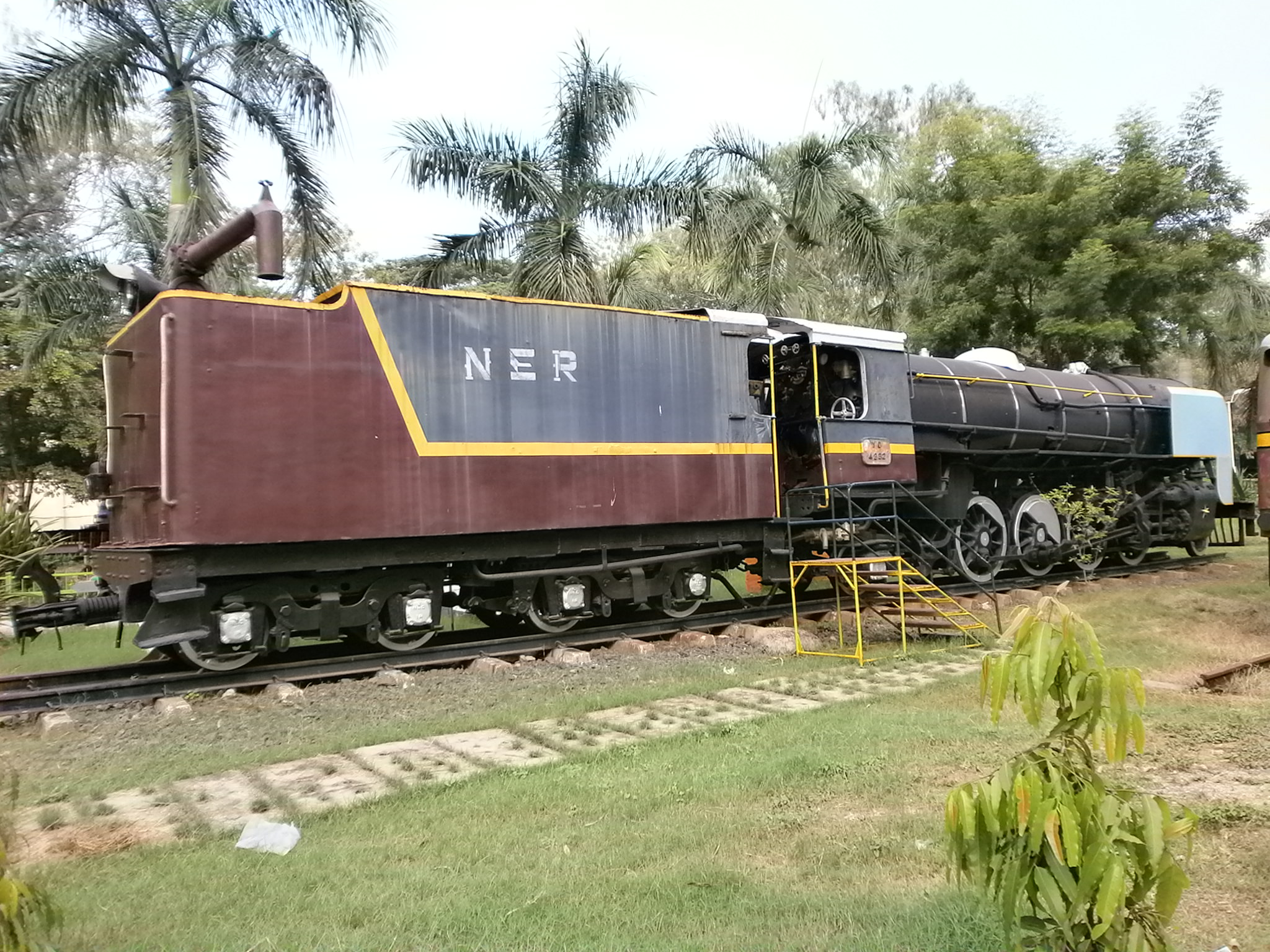
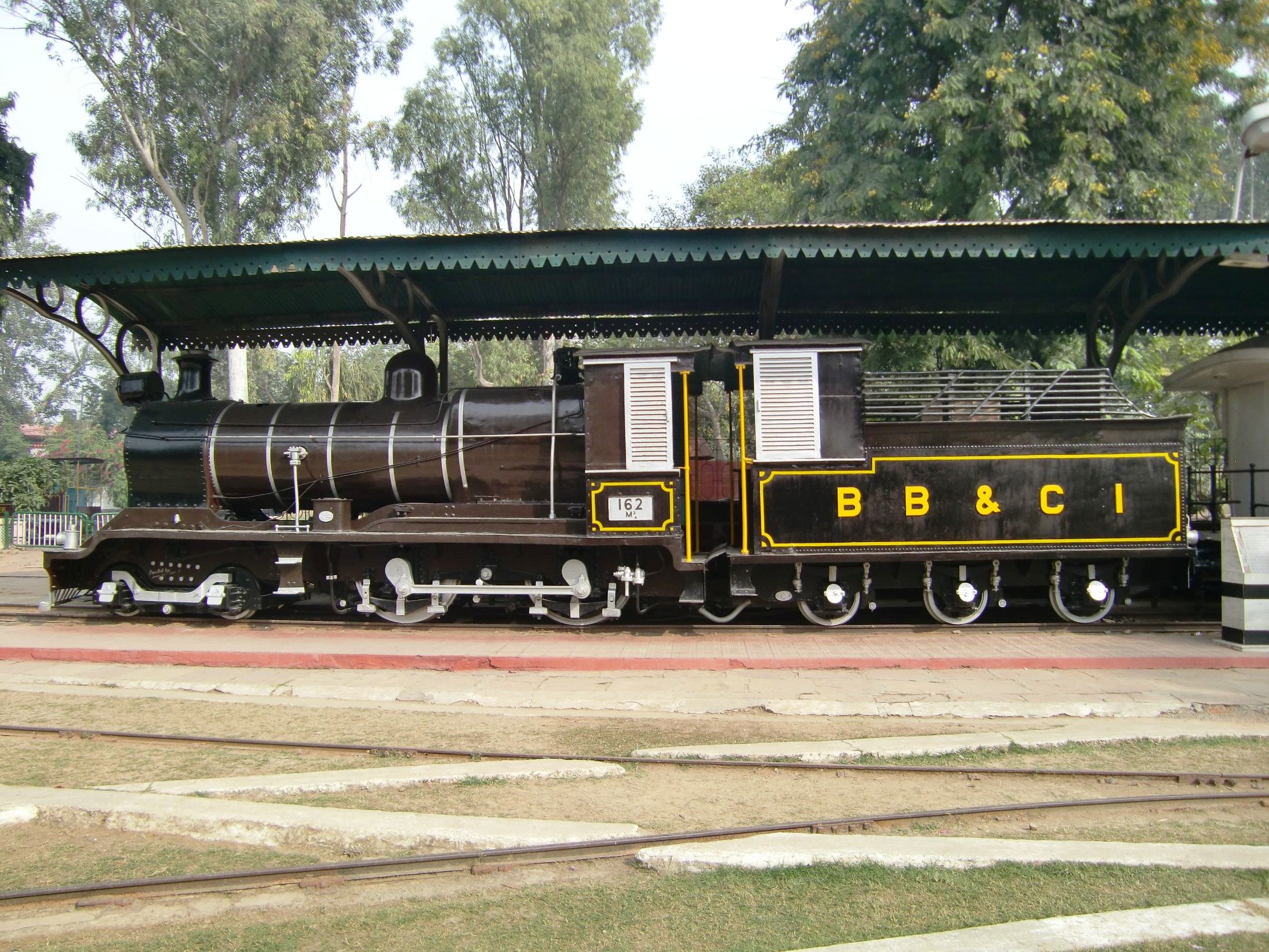
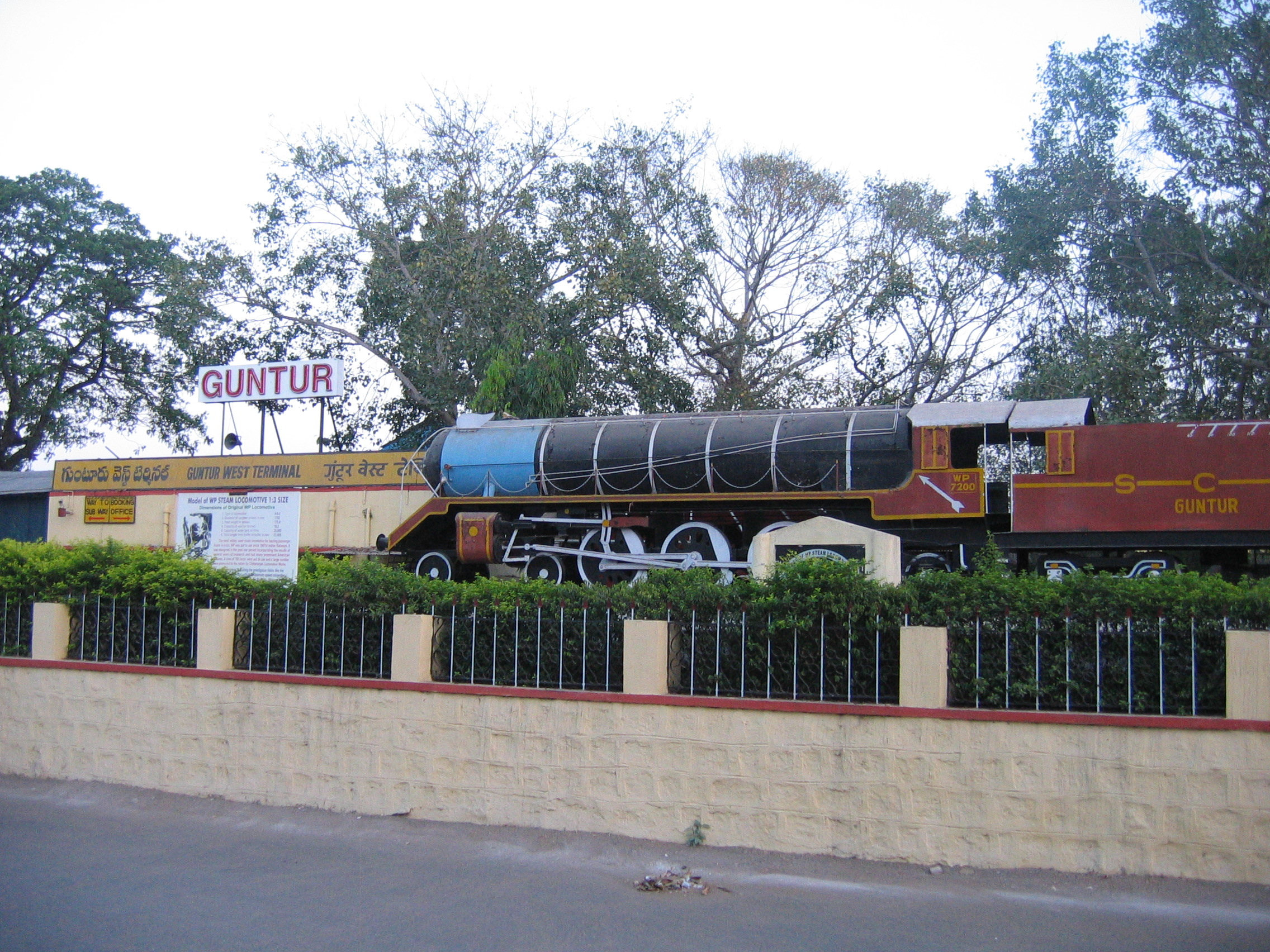
(clockwise from upper left) WL- and YG-class locomotives; an M2-162, and a display engine in Guntur Division

Although new classes were designed shortly before the war, many did not enter service until the post-war period. The new classes were indicated by the change of broad-gauge prefix from X to W, and plans were implemented to begin manufacturing locomotives in India. The new classes were:

- Class WP: passenger 4-6-2, 18.50-ton axle load
- Class WG: goods 2-8-2, 18.50-ton axle load
- Class WL (1st): light 4-6-2, 16.00-ton axle load (four for North Western Railway in 1939; all to Pakistan during partition of India)
- Class WL (2nd): light 4-6-2, 16.75-ton axle load
- Class WM: 2-6-4T, 16.25-ton axle load
- Class WT: 2-8-4T, 18.00-ton axle load
- Class WU: 2-4-2T, 16.50-ton axle load
- Class WV: 2-6-2T, 16.25-ton axle load
- Class WW: 0-6-2T, 16.50-ton axle load

All broad-gauge steam locomotives in India have been withdrawn from normal service, with only occasional steam specials continuing to operate.

=== Metre-gauge ===
- Nilgiri Mountain Railway X class
- BESA designs:
  - Passenger (4-6-0)
  - Mixed (4-6-0)
  - Goods (4-8-0)
  - Tank (2-6-2T)
- Indian Railway Standards designs of the late 1920s:
  - Class YA: 4-6-2 with 9-ton axle load (none built)
  - Class YB: 4-6-2 with 10-ton axle load (161 built for India and 50 for Burma)
  - Class YC: 4-6-2 with 12-ton axle load (15 built for India and 13 for Burma)
  - Class YD: 2-8-2 with 10-ton axle load (171 built for India, 61 for Burma, and 25 for East Pakistan)
  - Class YE: 2-8-2 with 12-ton axle load (none built)
  - Class YF: 0-6-2 with 8-ton axle load; later examples were 2-6-2 (111 built for India)
  - Class YK: 2-6-0 version of the 2-6-2 YF, 8-ton axle load (25 built for India)
  - Class YT: 0-4-2T with 8-ton axle load (2 built for India)
- Wartime designs:
  - Class MAWD: 2-8-2 USATC S118 Class
  - Class MWGX: 4-6-2+2-6-4 Garratt
- Indian Railway Standards post-war designs
  - Class YL: 2-6-2 mixed traffic locomotive with 8-ton axle load (264 built 1953–1957)
  - Class YG: 2-8-2 goods locomotive with 10 1/2-ton axle load (1074 built 1949–1972)
  - Class YP: 4-6-2 passenger locomotive with 10 1/2-ton axle load (871 built 1949–1970)
  - Class YM 2-6-4T with 9-ton axle load (12 built 1956)

=== 2 ft 6 in (762 mm) gauge ===
- Barsi Light Railway:
  - Class A: 0-8-4T
  - Class B: 4-8-4T
  - Class C: 0-6-0ST
  - Class D: 0-4-0
  - Class E: Sentinel railcars
  - Class F: 2-8-2
  - Class G: 4-6-4
- Indian Railway Standards:
  - Class ZA: 2-6-2 with 4.5-ton axle load (none built)
  - Class ZB: 2-6-2 with 6-ton axle load
  - Class ZC: 2-8-2 with 6-ton axle load (none built)
  - Class ZD: 4-6-2 with 8-ton axle load (none built)
  - Class ZE: 2-8-2 with 8-ton axle load
  - Class ZF: 2-6-2T with 8-ton axle load

=== 2 ft (610 mm) gauge ===
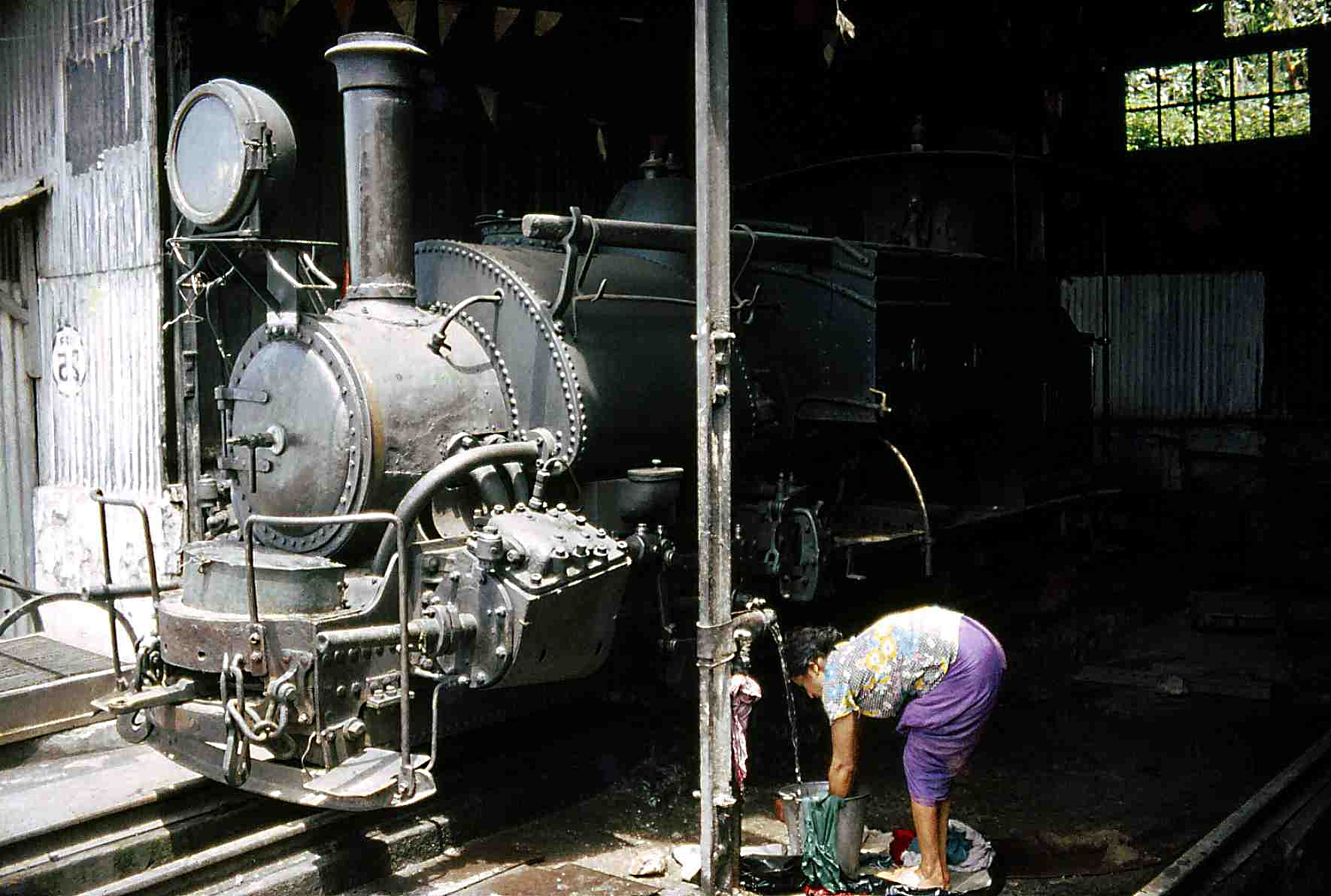
DHR B class locomotive in Darjeeling shed (1979)

- Darjeeling Himalayan Railway:
  - DHR A Class: 0-4-0WT;
  - DHR B Class: 0-4-0ST; #777 and #778 preserved
  - DHR C Class: 4-6-2
  - DHR D Class: 0-4-0+0-4-0 Garratt
- Matheran Light Railway:
  - MLR 1-4: 0-6-0T
- Indian Railway Standards (none built):
  - QA: 2-6-2 with 4.5-ton axle load
  - QB: 2-6-2 with 6-ton axle load
  - QC: 2-8-2 with 6-ton axle load

== Others ==
In 2015, the first compressed natural gas (CNG) powered multiple units were rolled out by ICF. In 2020, Southern Railway zone introduced the first battery/AC dual shunter, termed as WAG5HA, with "H" for hybrid. The first indigenously designed and manufactured hydrogen-powered train was introduced in August 2025.

== See also ==
- Rail transport in India
- List of locomotive builders

== Notes ==
=== Bibliography ===
- Sampson, Henry (1960). World Railways 1960. Sampson Low, Marston and Co. – via Internet Archive.
- Hughes, Hugh (1976). Steam in India. Truro, Cornwall: D. Bradford Barton Ltd. ISBN 0851532586.
- Hughes, Hugh (1979). Steam locomotives in India, Part 3 – Broad Gauge. Harrow, Middlesex: The Continental Railway Circle. ISBN 0-9503469-4-2 – via Internet Archive.
- Allen, Geoffrey Freeman, ed. (1982). Janes World Railways 1982 - 83. Janes World Railways. London: Jane's Publishing Company. ISBN 9780867206180 – via Internet Archive.
- Hughes, Hugh (1990). Indian Locomotives: Part 1 – Broad Gauge 1851–1940. Harrow, Middlesex: The Continental Railway Circle. ISBN 0-9503469-8-5. OCLC 21871114.
- Hughes, Hugh (1992). Indian Locomotives: Part 2 – Metre Gauge 1872–1940. Harrow, Middlesex: The Continental Railway Circle. ISBN 0-9503469-9-3. OCLC 26549293.
- Hughes, Hugh (1994). Indian Locomotives: Part 3 – Narrow Gauge 1863–1940. Harrow, Middlesex: The Continental Railway Circle. ISBN 0-9521655-0-3. OCLC 39496543.
- Hughes, Hugh (1996). Indian Locomotives: Part 4 – 1941–1990. Harrow, Middlesex: The Continental Railway Circle. ISBN 0-9521655-1-1. OCLC 35135033.
- Marshall, Lawrence G (2001). Indian Narrow Gauge Steam Remembered. East Harling, Norfolk: Plateway Press. ISBN 1871980488.
- Marshall, Lawrence G (2005). Indian Metre Gauge Steam Remembered. East Harling, Norfolk: Plateway Press. ISBN 1871980542.
- Marshall, Lawrence G (2009). Indian Broad Gauge Steam Remembered. East Harling, Norfolk: Taverner Publications. ISBN 9781901470154.
- Woods, George (2017). Indian Steam in the 1970s. Stroud, Glos: Amberley Publishing. ISBN 9781445666785.
