= WW class =

WW class or Class WW may refer to:

- Indian locomotive class WW, 0-6-2T steam locomotives
- NZR WW class, 4-6-4T steam locomotives
