= YDM =

YDM may refer to:

- Year-day-month format for calendar dates
- YDM, the prefix for metre-gauge diesel locomotives of India
