= Indian locomotive class YDM-1 =

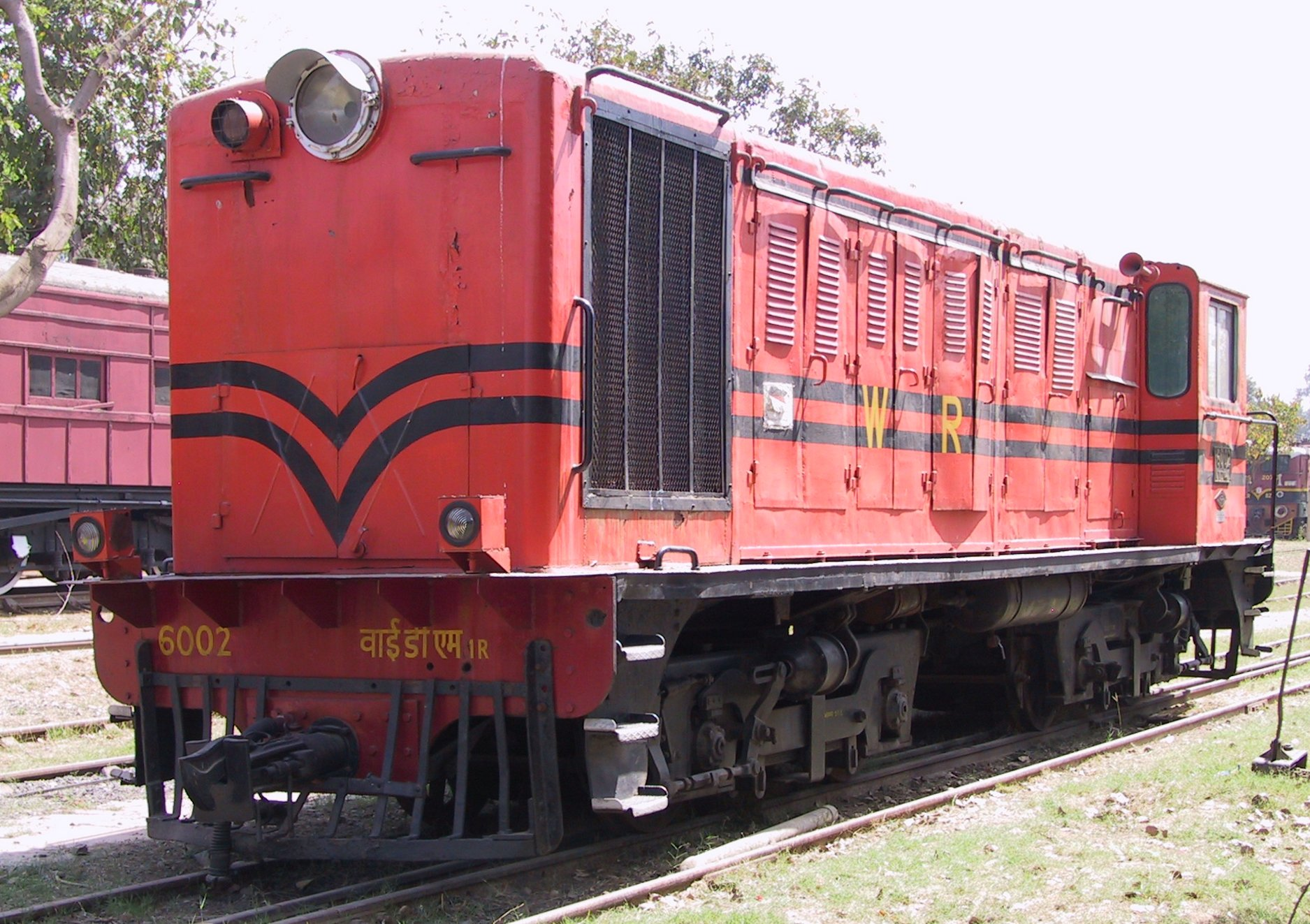
- A YDM-1 class locomotive no 6002 preserved at National Rail Museum, New Delhi
Type and origin
- Power type: Diesel
- Designer: North British Locomotive Company (NBL)
- Builder: North British Locomotive Company (NBL)
- Order number: PR/4574/S/4910/52
- Build date: 1954–1956
- Total produced: 20
- Rebuilder: CLW
- Rebuild date: 1974–1976
- Number rebuilt: 20
Specifications
- Configuration
  - AAR: B'-B'
  - UIC: B-B
  - Commonwealth: Bo-Bo
- Gauge: 1,000 mm (3 ft 3 3/8 in) metre gauge
- Wheel diameter: 804 mm (31.65 in)
- Wheelbase: 2,134 mm (84.02 in)
  - Engine: 1
- Length
  - Over couplers: 12.020 m (39 ft 5 1/4 in)
  - Over body: 10.630 m (34 ft 10 1/2 in)
- Width: 2,743 mm (9 ft 0 in)
- Height: 3,421 mm (11 ft 2 5/8 in)
- Axle load: 11,000 kg (24,000 lb)
- Loco weight: 43,680 kg (96,300 lb)
- Fuel type: Diesel
- Fuel capacity: 3,724 L (819 imp gal; 984 US gal)
- Lubricant cap.: 200 L (44 imp gal; 53 US gal)
- Coolant cap.: 204 L (45 imp gal; 54 US gal)
- Sandbox cap.: 0.35 L (0.077 imp gal; 0.092 US gal)
- Power supply: 110 V DC supply
- Prime mover: Earlier Paxman V12 RPHXL II, 625/580hp replaced by Mak/CLW L6 6M 282 A(K), 700hp
- RPM
  - RPM low idle: 525
  - RPM idle: 525
  - Maximum RPM: 1250
- Engine type: 12RPHXL/II
- Aspiration: Turbo-supercharged
- Alternator: Boom Wade N5
- Generator: C.A.V D3-9
- Head end power: 110 V DC
- Cylinders: 12
- Transmission: Voith hydraulic with Cardan shaft drive to bogies
- MU working: 2
- Loco brake: Air brake, hand brakes,
- Train brakes: Vacuum brake
- Compressor: 494 L (109 imp gal; 131 US gal)
- Exhauster: 852 L (187 imp gal; 225 US gal)
Performance figures
- Maximum speed: 83 km/h (52 mph)
- Power output: Earlier Paxman V12 RPHXL II 580 hp (430 kW) replaced by Mak/CLW L6 6M 282 A(K) 700 hp (520 kW)
- Tractive effort
  - Starting: 10.320 t (10 long tons; 11 short tons)
  - Continuous: 08.230 t (8 long tons; 9 short tons)
Career
- Operators: Indian Railways
- Class: Earlier 'DY' class
- Numbers: 6000-6019
- Locale: Western Railway zone
- First run: 1955-56
- Last run: 1995
- Retired: 1995
- Withdrawn: 1990s
- Preserved: 3(6002, 6008, 6015)
- Scrapped: 2000s
- Current owner: NRM, ICF resume
- Disposition: All except 3 scrapped

The Indian locomotive class YDM-1 is a class of diesel-Hydraulic locomotive that was developed in 1954 by North British Locomotive Company (NBL) for Indian Railways. Its class designation denotes a metre gauge (Y) diesel (D) mixed traffic (M) locomotive of the 1st generation (1). They entered service in 1955. A total of 20 YDM-1 locomotives was built between 1954 and 1956, which made them among the first metre-gauge main-line diesels.

The YDM-1 served both passenger and freight trains for over 46 years. As of January 2020, all 20 locomotives have been withdrawn from service with 3 locomotives being preserved at various location around India.

== History ==
These locomotives originally called 'DY' class was imported from North British Locomotive Company (NBL) to haul goods and passenger rakes in Western Railways particularly around Gandhidham due to of scarcity of water for steam locomotives. These are among the first Metre Gauge main-line diesels locomotives of India.

The YDM-1 class locomotives are the survivors from the second batch of North British diesel locos supplied in 1955. They were homed at a specifically made Diesel shed in Gandhidham. CLW replaced the engines on these with Maybach engines around 1975. Western Railways phased these locos out in the end of the 1990s (December 1999) from mainline service and from shunting duties in Ajmer on 15 February 2001. YDM-1 6002 came at NRM from Wankaner in August 2003 after renovation at Ajmer Loco Workshop.

== Specification ==
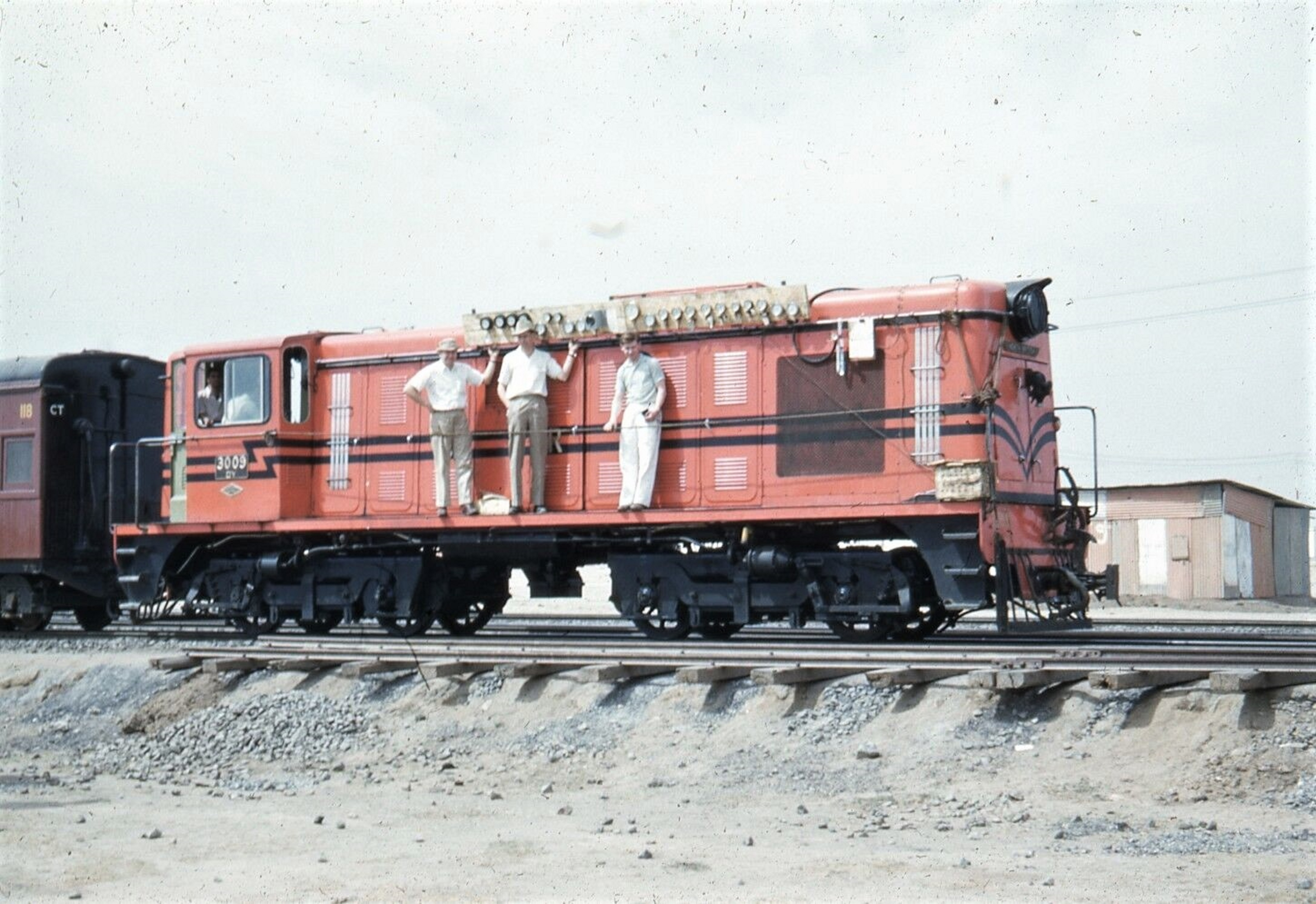
A YDM-1 hauling an inspection special

Original No	No 3001 to 3020
Maker's Name & No	North British; Locomotive Co. Glasgow, UK, 27507
Builders	North British Locomotive
Engine	Paxman V12 RPHXL II, 625/580 hp replaced by Mak/CLW L6 6M 282 A(K), 700 hp
Transmission	Voith hydraulic with Cardan shaft drive to bogies
Year Built	1954
Gear Box	David Brown, UK
Wheel Arrangement	B-B
Hauling Power	10,977 kg
Tare Weight	42 Tonnes
Gauge	1 Metre
Cost	Rs. 4,85,209/- (Capital Head)
Remarks	Fitted with Automatic, Vacuum & Air Brake System
First Trip	From Gandhi Dham to Palanpur
Last Service	worked for Kandla Port and Naliya etc.

== Preserved Examples ==
A total of three YDM-1 locomotives have been preserved all over India.

Class	Manufacturer	Loco Number	Previous shed	Name	Livery	Location	ref
YDM-1	NBL	6002	Gandhidham		Orange with twin black stripes	plinthed at National Railway Museum, Delhi (NRM)	
YDM-1R	NBL	6008	Gandhidham		Light blue/red/dark blue	Preserved at Regional Rail Museum, Chennai.	
YDM-1	NBL	6012	Gandhidham		Navy blue with yellow stripe	Preserved at Regional Rail Museum, Chennai.	

== Former shed ==
- Gandhidham (GIM): All the locomotives of this class has been withdrawn from service.

== See also ==
- Rail transport in India § History
- Indian Railways
- Locomotives of India
- Rail transport in India
