= Indian locomotive class WDS-3 =

Type and origin
- Power type: Diesel-hydraulic
- Builder: Maschinenbau Kiel
- Serial number: 600330–600336
- Model: 650 C
- Build date: 1961
- Total produced: 7
- Rebuilder: CLW
- Rebuild date: 1976–1978
- Number rebuilt: All 7
Specifications
- Configuration
  - UIC: C
  - Commonwealth: 0-6-0DH
- Gauge: 1,676 mm (5 ft 6 in)
- Wheel diameter: 1,092 mm (3 ft 7 in)
- Length
  - Over couplers: 10.700 m (35 ft 1 1/4 in)
  - Over body: 9.430 m (30 ft 11 1/4 in)
- Width: 3.030 m (9 ft 11 5/16 in)
- Height: 4.267 m (14 ft 0 in)
- Loco weight: 57 tonnes (56 long tons; 63 short tons)
- Fuel type: Diesel
- Engine type: WDS-3; Maybach MD 435; WDS-4C; MaK MaK 6 M 282 A(K)
Performance figures
- Maximum speed: Mainline gear: 65 km/h (40 mph); Shunting: 27 km/h (17 mph)
- Power output: WDS-3; 618 hp (461 kW); WDS-4C; 700 hp (520 kW)
- Tractive effort: Mainline gear: 11,500 kgf (113,000 N; 25,000 lbf); Shunting: 18,000 kgf (180,000 N; 40,000 lbf)
Career
- Operators: Indian Railways
- Numbers: 19046–19052
- Locale: All over Indian Railways
- Disposition: All scrapped

The class WDS-3 was a diesel-hydraulic locomotive used by Indian Railways for shunting and doing departmental work. The model name stands for broad gauge (W), diesel (D), shunting (S) 3rd generation (3). The WDS-3 is used mostly in the Northern Railway Zone (NR). All these locomotives were withdrawn and scrapped by the late 1990s.

== History ==
The history of WDS-3 class starts in the early 1960s with the aim of the Indian Railways to address the growing requirement for a new shunting locomotive class. These locomotives were designed by Maschinenbau Kiel (MaK) to the specifications set by the Research Design and Standards Organisation (RDSO). Many aspects of this locomotive were taken from the DB Class V 60. They use Suri hydrodynamic transmission developed for these diesel locomotives and were designed as shunting-cum-shuttle service locomotives. For this purpose, the reversing gear box was designed to have two gear stages; the locomotive had a maximum speed of 27 km/h (17 mph) in the lower gear (designated "shunting gear") and 65 km/h (40 mph) in higher gear (designated as "mainline gear). Subsequently, it was decided to manufacture similar designs by Chittaranjan Locomotive Works (CLW). These locomotives are designated as WDS-4 class.

When the lot of 7 WDS3 shunters came, initially they had a lot of troubles with these locomotives, but the trouble was confined more to the power pack than to the transmission. But in course of time, going into detail about the troubles that were being experienced and the mechanics were able to get over a lot of these difficulties and in-fact the transmission was also modified to suit with the engine. Between 1976 and 1978 all seven units were rebuilt to WDS-4B specifications by CLW, and received a new engine and a simplified transmission. These units were reclassified as WDS-4Cs. By 1990s all units were withdrawn from service and were scrapped.

== Former shed ==
- Shakurbasti (SSB): All the locomotives of this class has been withdrawn from service.

== See also ==
- Rail transport in India § History
- Locomotives of India
- Rail transport in India
- Indian locomotive class WDM-2
