= Indian locomotive class WCM-4 =

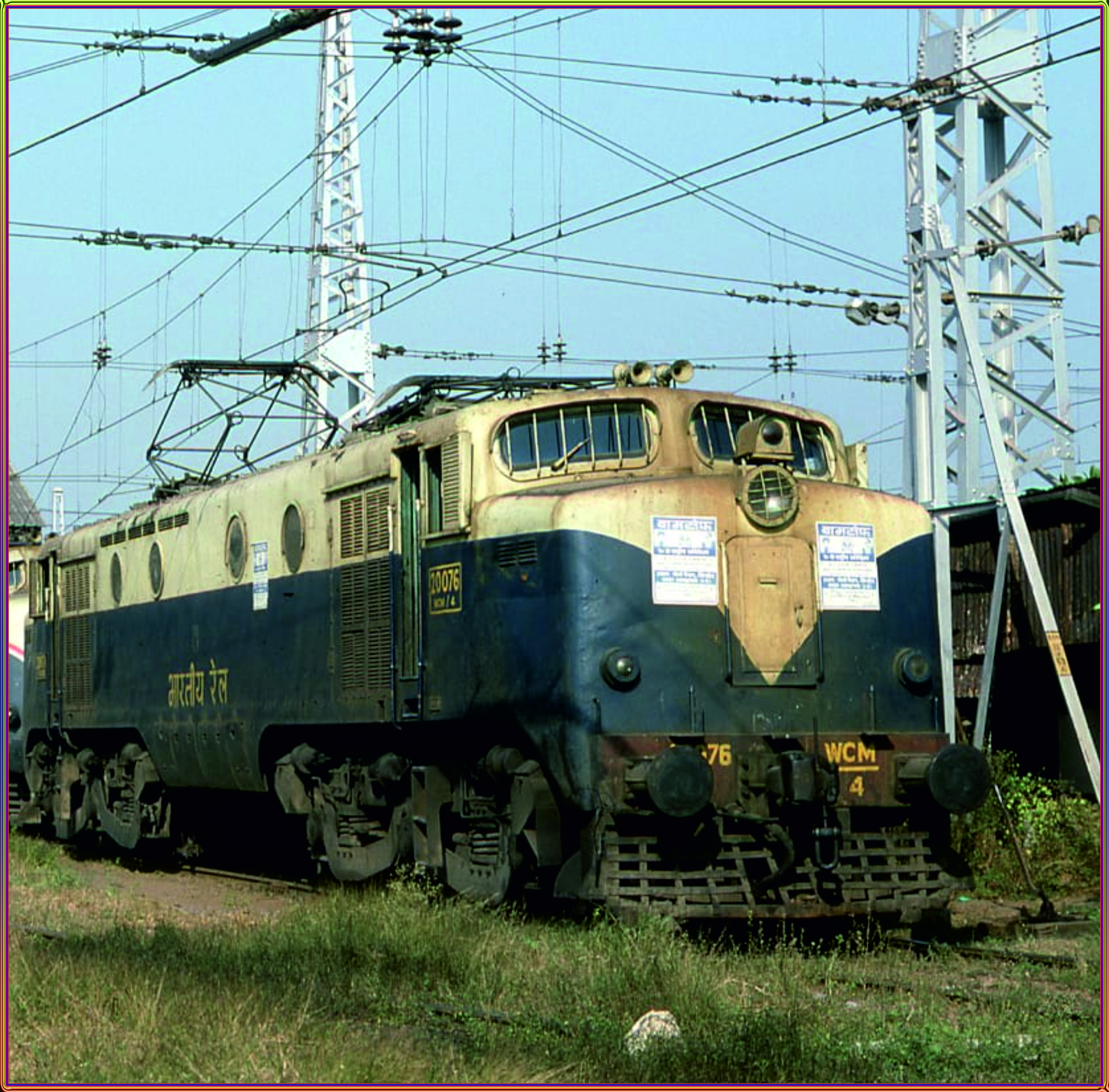
- A WCM-4 at Bombay Victoria Electric loco trip Shed
Type and origin
- Power type: Electric
- Designer: Hitachi
- Builder: Hitachi
- Order number: 59/459/1/RS(F)
- Model: EM/4
- Build date: 18 April 1959
- Total produced: 7
Specifications
- Configuration
  - AAR: C-C
  - UIC: Co′Co′
  - Commonwealth: Co-Co
- Gauge: 5 ft 6 in (1,676 mm)
- Bogies: 3 Axle fabricated frame, Swing bolster with Equalizer beams
- Wheel diameter: New: 1,220 mm (4 ft 0 in), Half worn: 1,182 mm (3 ft 10 1/2 in) and Full worn: 1,144 mm (3 ft 9 in)
- Wheelbase: 2,380 mm (7 ft 10 in)
- Length
  - Over couplers: 20.000 m (65 ft 7 3/8 in)
  - Over body: 18.680 m (61 ft 3 7/16 in)
- Width: 3.050 m (10 ft 1/16 in)
- Height: 4.282 m (14 ft 9/16 in)
- Frame type: 3 Axle fabricated frame
- Axle load: 20.83 tonnes (20.50 long tons; 22.96 short tons)
- Loco weight: 125.00 tonnes (123.03 long tons; 137.79 short tons)
- Sandbox cap.: 16 sandboxes each
- Power supply: 110 V DC
- Electric system/s: 1.5 kV DC Overhead
- Current pickup: Pantograph
- Traction motors: HS-373-BR
  - Rating 1 hour: 765A
  - Continuous: 620A
- Gear ratio: 16:73
- MU working: Not possible
- Loco brake: Air/Hand, Regenerative braking
- Train brakes: Vacuum
- Compressor: 7kg/cm²
- Safety systems: Slip control, Over voltage relay, No volt relay, Low pressure governor, Vacuum governor Train parting alarms, and Brake cylinder cutoff valve
Performance figures
- Maximum speed: 120.5 km/h (75 mph)
- Power output
  - Starting: Max: 4,000 hp (2,980 kW)
  - 1 hour: Max: 4,000 hp (2,980 kW)
  - Continuous: Max: 3,290 hp (2,450 kW)
- Tractive effort
  - Starting: 31,250 kgf (310 kN)
  - 1 hour: 25,300 kgf (250 kN)
  - Continuous: 18,700 kgf (180 kN)
- Factor of adh.: 0.25
Career
- Operators: Indian Railways
- Class: EM/4
- Numbers: 20076-20082
- Locale: Central Railways
- Delivered: 1959
- First run: 1959
- Last run: January 2000
- Retired: Early 2000s
- Withdrawn: Early 2000s
- Preserved: none
- Disposition: All scrapped.

The Indian locomotive class WCM-4 was a class of 1.5 kV DC electric locomotives developed in the late 1950s by Hitachi for Indian Railways. The model name stands for broad gauge (W), Direct Current (C), Mixed traffic (M) engine, 4th generation (4). A total of 7 WCM-4 locomotives were built in Japan in 1959 for Central Railways.

== History ==
Indian Railways decided to procure seven locomotives from Hitachi. They were manufactured in Japan and shipped to India in 1959. These locomotives had now-common Co-Co wheel arrangement. Initially the WCM-4 class were known as EM/4 class.

== See also ==
- Rail transport in India § History
- Indian Railways
- Locomotives of India
- Rail transport in India
