= Indian locomotive class WU =

Indian WU
- East Indian Railway 2200
Type and origin
- Power type: Steam
- Builder: Vulcan Foundry
- Serial number: 4783–4786
- Build date: 1940–1943
- Total produced: 4
Specifications
- Configuration
  - Whyte: 2-4-2T
  - UIC: 1′B1′h2t
- Gauge: 5 ft 6 in (1,676 mm)
- Driver dia.: 5 ft 1 1/2 in (1,562 mm)
- Fuel type: Coal
- Boiler pressure: 210 psi (1.45 MPa)
- Cylinders: Two, outside
- Cylinder size: 13 in × 26 in (330 mm × 660 mm)
- Valve gear: Caprotti
Career
- Operators: East Indian Railway; Indian Railways
- Number in class: 4
- Numbers: EIR: 2200–2203; IR: 26950–26953

The Indian locomotive class WU was a class of 2-4-2T steam locomotives used on 5 ft 6 in (1,676 mm) broad-gauge lines in India.

The four members of the class were built by Vulcan Foundry in Newton-le-Willows, Lancashire, England, to an order placed by the East Indian Railway (EIR) in 1940. They were completed in 1943.

Proposals were later made for additional members of the class WU to be built. However, the class lacked the ability to cope with post-World War II traffic, and therefore the proposals were never realised. The WUs were still in service on the Eastern Railway Zone in the late 1970s.

== See also ==
- Rail transport in India § History
- Indian Railways
- Locomotives of India
- Rail transport in India
