= Indian locomotive class XD =

Indian XD
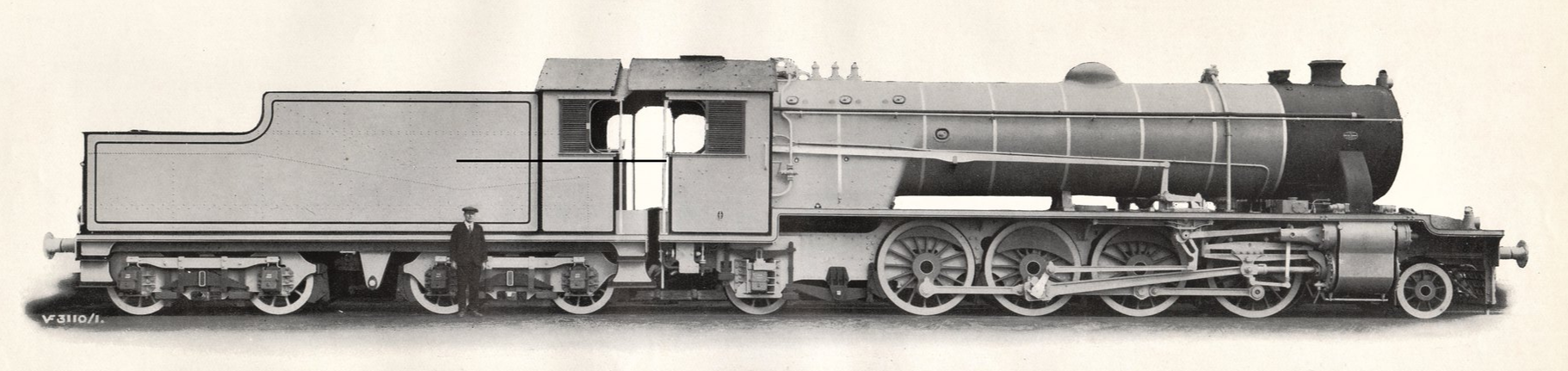
Type and origin
- Power type: Steam
- Builder: Vulcan Foundry (41); Armstrong Whitworth (11); Škoda Works (10); North British Locomotive Co. (132)
- Build date: 1928–1948
- Total produced: 194
Specifications
- Configuration
  - Whyte: 2-8-2
  - UIC: 1′D1′h2
- Gauge: 5 ft 6 in (1,676 mm)
- Driver dia.: 5 ft 1 1/2 in (1.562 m)
- Wheelbase: 35 ft 0 in (10.668 m)
- Axle load: 17 long tons (17 t; 19 short tons)
- Adhesive weight: 68 long tons (69 t; 76 short tons)
- Loco weight: 95.5 long tons (97.0 t; 107.0 short tons)
- Tender weight: 65 long tons (66 t; 73 short tons)
- Fuel type: Coal
- Fuel capacity: 10 long tons (10 t; 11 short tons)
- Water cap.: 4,500 imp gal (20,000 L; 5,400 US gal)
- Boiler pressure: 180 psi (1.24 MPa)
- Heating surface
  - Tubes: 1,986 sq ft (184.5 m^{2})
  - Total surface: 2,176 sq ft (202.2 m^{2})
- Superheater
  - Heating area: 540 sq ft (50 m^{2})
- Cylinders: Two, outside
- Cylinder size: 22 1/2 in × 28 in (572 mm × 711 mm)
- Valve gear: Walschaerts
- Loco brake: Steam
Performance figures
- Tractive effort: 37,335 lbf (166.07 kN)
- Factor of adh.: 4.08
Career
- Operators: Indian Railways
- Number in class: IR: 194

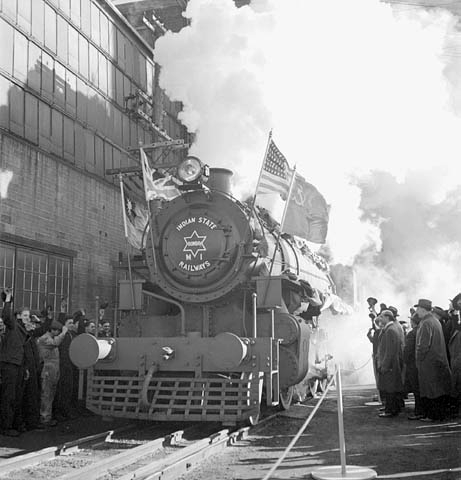
Functional testing of the first ‘X-Dominion’ locomotive built at the Montreal (Quebec) plant, for shipment to India under the Mutual Aid Agreement of the Council in November 1943. (‘X-Dominion’ later class CWD).

The Indian locomotive class XD was a class of 2-8-2 "Mikado" type steam locomotives used on 5 ft 6 in (1,676 mm) broad gauge lines in India. It is known as CWD class in Pakistan

== Variants ==
AWD: Similar design made by Baldwin Locomotive Works in the World War II period.

CWD: Similar design made by the Canadian Locomotive Company and the Montreal Loco Works. Along with AWD, the largest imported class, numerically.

== See also ==
- Rail transport in India § History
- Indian Railways
- Locomotives of India
