= Indian locomotive class WDS-2 =

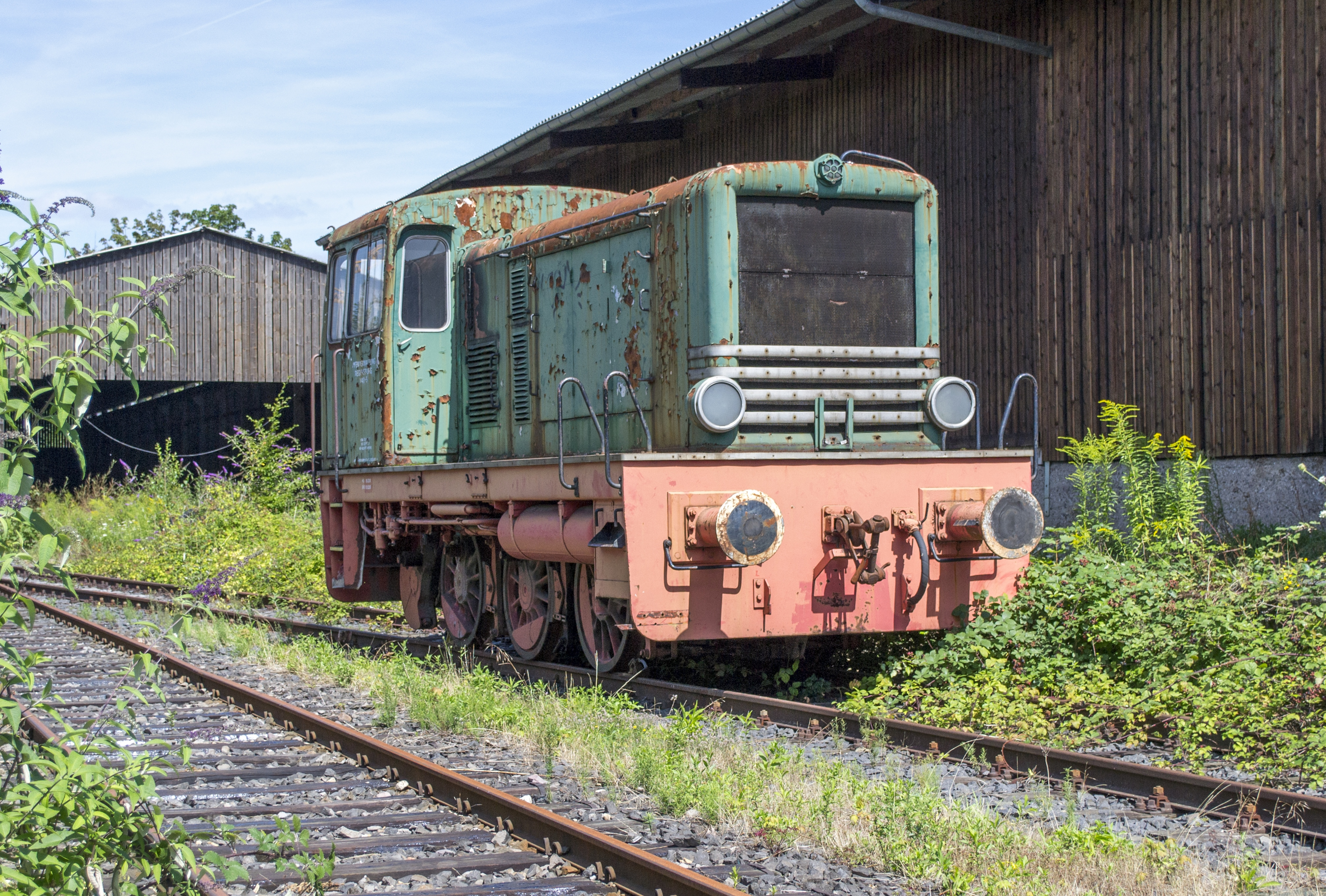
- A Krauss-Maffei ML 400 C on which WDS-2 is based
Type and origin
- Power type: Diesel
- Builder: Krauss-Maffei
- Model: Krauss-Maffei ML 400 C
- Build date: 1954–1955
- Total produced: 30
Specifications
- Configuration
  - UIC: C
  - Commonwealth: C
- Gauge: 1,676 mm (5 ft 6 in)
- Wheel diameter: 1,092 mm (3 ft 7 in)
- Length
  - Over couplers: 8.535 m (28 ft 0 in)
  - Over body: 72.65 m (238 ft 4 1/4 in)
- Width: 3.150 m (10 ft 4 in)
- Height: 3.925 m (12 ft 10 1/2 in)
- Loco weight: 51,400 kg (113,300 lb) to 46,000 kg (101,000 lb)
- Fuel type: Diesel
- Engine type: Diesel
- Aspiration: Turbo-supercharged
- Generator: DC
- Transmission: Diesel–electric
- MU working: 2
- Loco brake: Vacuum
- Train brakes: Vacuum
Performance figures
- Maximum speed: 54 km/h (34 mph)
- Power output: Max: 440 hp (330 kW)
- Tractive effort: 15,420 kgf (151,219 N; 33,995 lbf)
Career
- Operators: Indian Railways
- Numbers: 19016-045
- Locale: Mostly on present day Central Railways, few on Northern Railways
- Delivered: 1954
- First run: 1954
- Last run: 1990s
- Retired: 1990s
- Withdrawn: 1990s
- Disposition: All scrapped

The Indian locomotive class WDS-2 was a class of diesel-electric locomotive that was developed in 1954 by Krauss Maffei for Indian Railways. The model name stands for broad gauge (W), Diesel (D), Shunting locomotive (S) engine, 2nd generation (2). They entered service in 1955. A total of 20 WDS-2 was built in Germany between 1954 and 1955, which made them the most numerous class of shunting diesel locomotive until the WDS-4B.

The WDS-2 served both shunting and departmental trains for over 45 years. As of January 2020, all locomotives have been withdrawn and scrapped.

== History ==
These locomotives were imported from Germany in 1954. They are based on the Krauss-Maffei ML 400 C with the power-pack of Krauss-Maffei ML 440 C. They were among the first diesel locomotives of India. They were very loud in operation.

== Former sheds ==
- Kurla (CR)
- Shakurbasti (SSB)
- Lucknow (LKD)

== See also ==
- Rail transport in India § History
- Locomotives of India
- Rail transport in India
- Indian locomotive class WDM-2
