= Indian locomotive class YDM-2 =

Class of diesel-Hydraulic locomotive

Type and origin
- Power type: Diesel
- Designer: Chittaranjan Locomotive Works
- Builder: Chittaranjan Locomotive Works
- Build date: 1986–1990
- Total produced: 41
Specifications
- Configuration
  - AAR: B'-B'
  - UIC: B-B
  - Commonwealth: Bo-Bo
- Gauge: 1,000 mm (3 ft 3 3/8 in) metre gauge
- Loco weight: 41,000 kg (90,000 lb)
- Power supply: 110 V DC supply
- Transmission: Diesel-Hydraulic
- Loco brake: Air brake
- Train brakes: Vacuum brake
Performance figures
- Maximum speed: 75 km/h (47 mph)
- Power output: 700 hp (520 kW)
- Tractive effort: 14.400 t (14 long tons; 16 short tons)
Career
- Numbers: 2001-2041
- Disposition: Retired

The Indian locomotive class YDM-2 is a class of diesel-Hydraulic locomotive that was developed in 1986-90 by Chittaranjan Locomotive Works for Indian Railways. The model name stands for Metre gauge (Y), Diesel (D), Mixed traffic (M) engine, 2nd generation (2). They entered service in 1986. A total of 41 YDM-2 locomotives was built between 1986 and 1990.

== History ==
The history of YDM-2 begins in the early 1980s with the stated aim of the Indian Railways to remove steam locomotives from Indian rails after recommendation of Karnail Singh Fuel Committee. Therefore, required building a large number of Meter gauge diesel locomotives. Thus Indian Railways began looking at various diesel-electric designs. These locomotives were designed by CLW for hauling both passenger and freight traffic. They used suri transmission similar to one used in the broad gauged WDM-3. 41 of these locomotives were built and they were initially homed at Moula Ali (MLY) diesel loco shed in Southern Central Railways division (SCR). After Moula Ali line was converted to Broad gauge, these locomotives were transferred to Golden rock(GOC) shed in the Southern Railway Zone. They hauled passenger and goods trains till the late 2000s when the meter gauge lines were converted to broad gauge. All units are now withdrawn from service and all units are believed to be scrapped.

== Former sheds ==
- Moula Ali (MLY)
- Golden Rock (GOC)
- All the locomotives of this class have been withdrawn from service.

== See also ==
- Indian locomotive class YDM-4
- Indian locomotive class WDM-3
- Locomotives of India
