= DHR A Class =

Type and origin
- Power type: Steam
- Builder: Sharp, Stewart & Co. (4); Hunslet (4)
- Total produced: 8
Specifications
- Configuration
  - Whyte: 0-4-0WT
  - UIC: B n2t
- Gauge: 2 ft (610 mm)
- Driver dia.: 26 in (0.660 m)
- Loco weight: 12 long tons (12 t)
- Superheater: None
- Cylinders: Two, outside
- Cylinder size: 10 in × 14 in (254 mm × 356 mm)
Career
- Operators: Darjeeling Himalayan Railway; → Indian Railways
- Class: DHR A Class
- Number in class: 8
- Numbers: 9–16
- Locale: West Bengal, India
- First run: 1881
- Withdrawn: 1954
- Disposition: All withdrawn and scrapped in 1954, only the frames of one of these are kept at Tindharia

The DHR A Class was a class of 2 ft (610 mm) gauge 0-4-0WT well tank steam locomotives used on the Darjeeling Himalayan Railway (DHR) in West Bengal, India. It was the DHR's first standard design of locomotive.

== Service history ==
A total of eight A Class locomotives served on the DHR. The first two, nos. 9 and 10, were built by Sharp, Stewart & Co. in 1881. The next four, nos. 11 to 14, were built the following year by Hunslet, although Sharp Stewart supplied the wheel centre forgings, chimney bases, all iron and brass castings and finished injectors. The final two members of the class, nos. 15 and 16, were built by Sharp, Stewart in 1883.

With the exception of numbers 9 and 10, all had been withdrawn from service by 1911. Number 10 was withdrawn in 1944 while in 1948 no 9 passed into the ownership of the Indian government, along with 34 B Class engines. It was withdrawn in 1954.

== Livery ==
All members of the class were painted DHR green throughout their time in service.

== Preservation ==
Only the frames of one A class were saved following withdrawal, these are kept at Tindharia.

== See also ==
- Rail transport in India § History
- Indian Railways
- Locomotives of India
- Rail transport in India
