= Indian locomotive class XE =

Indian XE
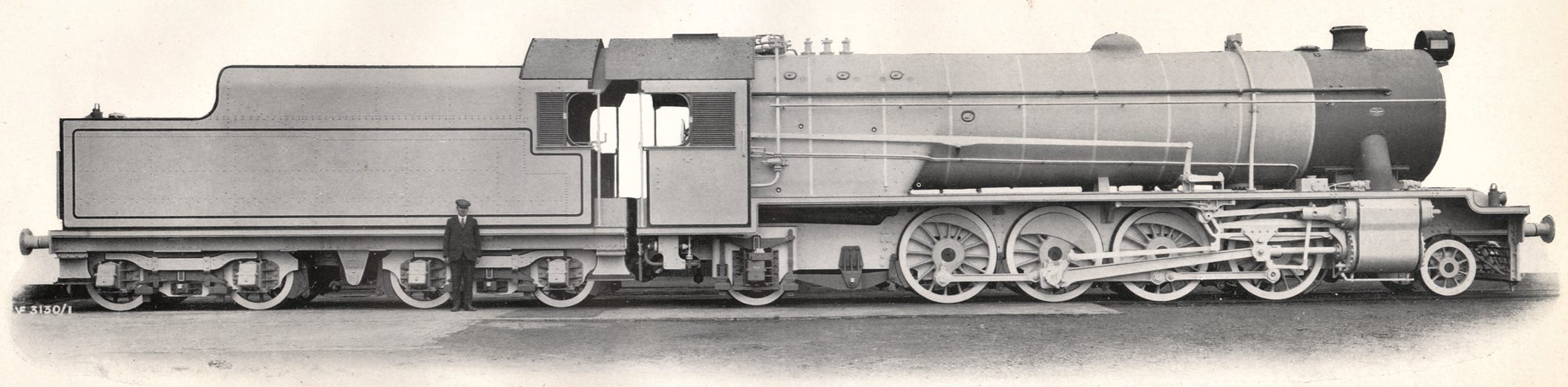
Type and origin
- Power type: Steam
- Builder: William Beardmore & Co (44); Vulcan Foundry (49)
- Build date: 1928–1930, 1945
- Total produced: 93
Specifications
- Configuration
  - Whyte: 2-8-2
  - UIC: 1′D1′h2
- Gauge: 5 ft 6 in (1,676 mm)
- Leading dia.: 3 ft 0 in (0.914 m)
- Driver dia.: 5 ft 1 1/2 in (1.562 m)
- Trailing dia.: 3 ft 7 in (1.092 m)
- Wheelbase: 36 ft 5 in (11.100 m)
- Axle load: 22.3 long tons (22.7 t; 25.0 short tons)
- Adhesive weight: 90 long tons (91 t; 100 short tons)
- Loco weight: 120.5 long tons (122.4 t; 135.0 short tons)
- Tender weight: 78 long tons (79 t; 87 short tons)
- Fuel type: Coal
- Fuel capacity: 14 long tons (14 t; 16 short tons)
- Water cap.: 6,000 imp gal (27,000 L; 7,200 US gal)
- Firebox
  - Grate area: 60 sq ft (5.6 m^{2})
- Boiler pressure: 210 psi (1.45 MPa)
- Heating surface
  - Firebox: 260 sq ft (24 m^{2})
  - Tubes: 2,754 sq ft (255.9 m^{2})
  - Total surface: 3,014 sq ft (280.0 m^{2})
- Superheater
  - Heating area: 763 sq ft (70.9 m^{2})
- Cylinders: Two, outside
- Cylinder size: 23 1/2 in × 30 in (597 mm × 762 mm)
- Valve gear: Walschaerts
- Loco brake: Steam
Performance figures
- Tractive effort: 50,920 lbf (226.50 kN)
- Factor of adh.: 3.96
Career
- Operators: Indian Railways
- Number in class: IR: 93
- Numbers: IR: 22501–22593
- Disposition: Five preserved, remainder scrapped

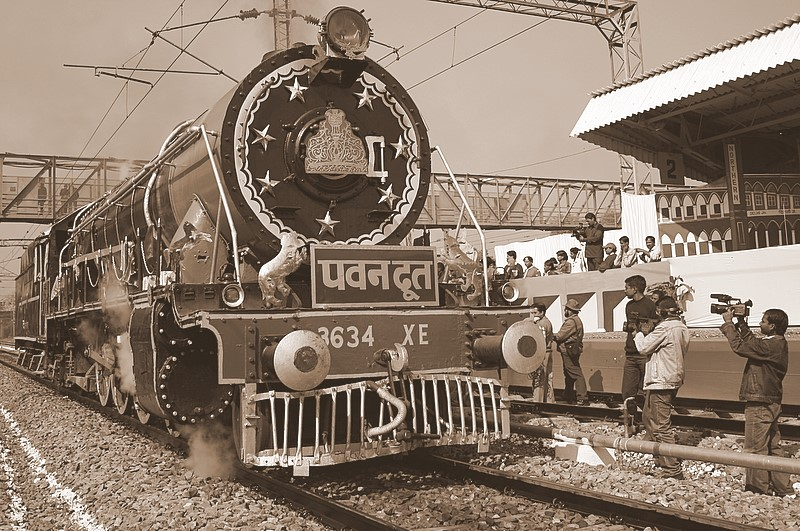
XE 3634 on display in New Delhi in Feb 2007

The Indian locomotive class XE (X Eagle) was a class of 2-8-2 "Mikado" type steam locomotives used on 5 ft 6 in (1,676 mm) broad-gauge lines in India. The class had a 7 ft (2.1 m) diameter boiler.

== Variants ==
AWE: Made by Baldwin Locomotive Works during and post World War II period when British manufacturers could not meet demand.

== Preservation ==
However, there are only five XE's preserved around India, XE 3634 (22541) is restored to working order at Rewari, 22577, and 22580 are both preserved private at MP Electricity Board, XE's 22531 and 22558 are preserved privately by UP Cement Corporation,

Working	Class	Number	Location	Built	Zone	Builders	Build no	Name
Yes	XE	22541	Rewari Steam Shed	1930	NW	Vulcan Foundry	3634	Pavandut
No	XE	22531	UP Cement Corporation					
No	XE	22558	UP Cement Corporation					
No	XE	22577	MP Electricity Board					
No	XE	22580	MP Electricity Board					

== See also ==
- Rail transport in India § History
- Indian Railways
- Locomotives of India
