= Indian locomotive class YM =

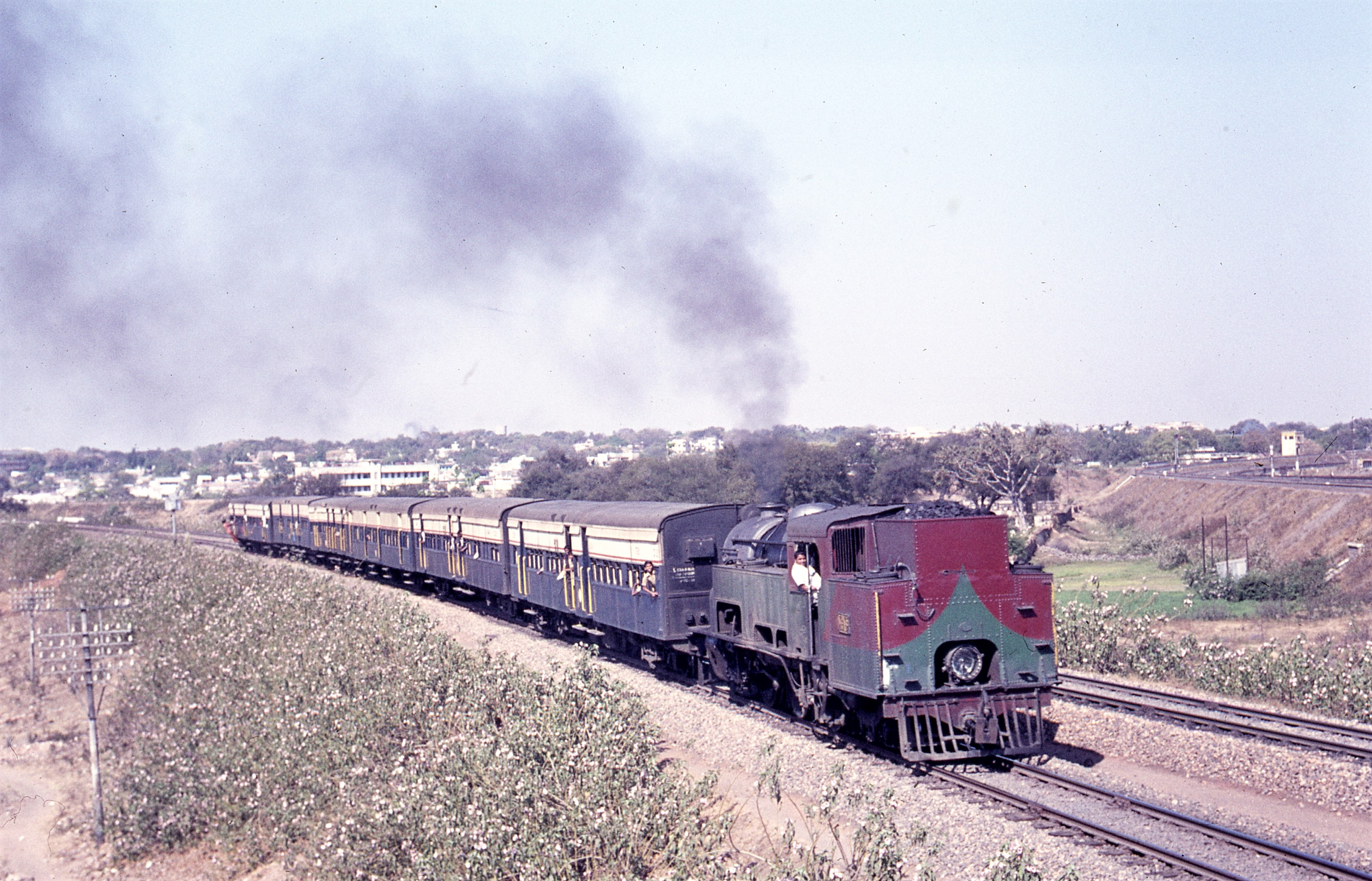
- YM 5757 at Secunderabad, 1976
Type and origin
- Power type: Steam
- Builder: Nippon Sharyo
- Build date: 1956
- Total produced: 12
Specifications
- Configuration
  - Whyte: 2-6-4T
- Gauge: 1,000 mm (3 ft 3 3/8 in)
- Coupled dia.: 1,219 mm (4 ft 0 in)
- Axle load: 9 t (8.9 long tons; 9.9 short tons)
- Adhesive weight: 27 t (27 long tons; 30 short tons)
- Service weight: 53.5 t (52.7 long tons; 59.0 short tons)
- Firebox
  - Grate area: 1.11 m^{2} (11.9 sq ft)
- Boiler pressure: 14.5 bar (210 psi)
- Heating surface: 51.75 m^{2} (557.0 sq ft)
- Cylinders: Two, outside
- Cylinder size: 330 mm × 560 mm (13 in × 22 in)
Career
- Operators: Indian Railways
- Numbers: Pre-1957: 6001–6012; Post-1957: 5750–5761

The Indian locomotive class YM were 2-6-4T tank locomotives built for Indian Railways' metre-gauge network, as one of the post-partition designs evolved from the Indian Railway Standard locomotives.

== History ==
In 1954, the Indian Railways ordered twelve tank locomotives from Nippon Sharyo for use on suburban trains, and were delivered in 1956 to the Central Railway zone. Three examples initially went to the Southern Railway zone, but were soon transferred to Lallaguda depot of Central Railways, near Secunderabad. The YM class were mainly used to haul trains on the line between Bolarum via Secunderabad to Hyderabad.

With the formation of the South Central Railway zone and the associated reorganization of the surrounding regional zones in October 1966, all 12 members went to the South Central Railways, where they were in service as of 1975.

Technically, the YM class were similar to the broad-gauge WM class, although the former is smaller than the latter.

== Proposed variants ==
Indian Railways drew up plans for the Class YS 2-10-6T heavy tank locomotive. In 1957, however, these plans were dropped, in favour of a larger, heavier version of the YM class, with an axle load of 10.5 tons and a service weight of 73 tons. A requirement of 89 locomotives was determined for both suburban and shunting duties. However, in light of both dieselisation and electrification, the plan ultimately never came to fruition, and surplus class YL locomotives were deployed for these roles.

== Bibliography ==
- Hughes, Hugh (1977). Steam Locomotives in India, Part 2 – Metre Gauge. The Continental Railway Circle. ISBN 0-9503469-3-4.
- Hughes, Hugh (1979). Steam Locomotives of India, Part 3 – Broad Gauge. The Continental Railway Circle. ISBN 0-9503469-4-2.
- Atkins, Philip (1999). Dropping the Fire - The Decline and Fall of the Steam Locomotive. Irwell Press. ISBN 1-871608-89-9.
