= Indian locomotive class XA =

Indian XA
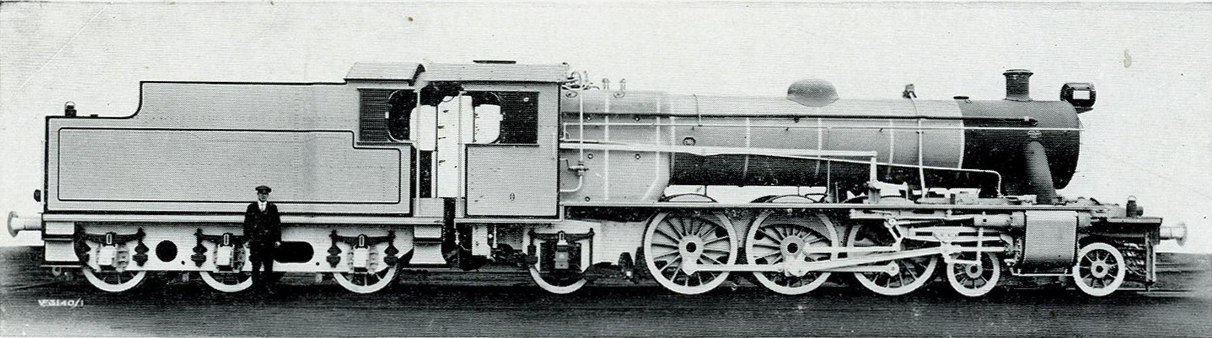
- Vulcan Foundry works photograph of an XA
Type and origin
- Power type: Steam
- Builder: Vulcan Foundry
- Build date: 1929, 1931, 1935
- Total produced: 113
Specifications
- Configuration
  - Whyte: 4-6-2
  - UIC: 2′C1′h2
- Gauge: 5 ft 6 in (1,676 mm)
- Driver dia.: 5 ft 1 1/2 in (1.562 m)
- Axle load: 13.1 long tons (13.3 t; 14.7 short tons)
- Loco weight: 67.15 long tons (68.23 t; 75.21 short tons)
- Tender weight: 42.1 long tons (42.8 t; 47.2 short tons)
- Fuel type: Coal
- Boiler pressure: 180 psi (1.24 MPa)
- Cylinders: Two, outside
- Cylinder size: 18 in × 26 in (457 mm × 660 mm)
- Valve gear: Walschaerts
Performance figures
- Tractive effort: 20,960 lbf (93.23 kN)
Career
- Operators: Indian Railways; Pakistan Railways
- Number in class: IR: 76; PR: 37
- Numbers: IR: 22001–22076

The Indian locomotive class XA was a class of light axle load 4-6-2 "Pacific" type steam locomotives used on 5 ft 6 in (1,676 mm) broad-gauge lines in British India, and then in post-partition India and Pakistan.

The 113 members of the class were built by Vulcan Foundry in Newton-le-Willows, Lancashire, England, in 1929/31, 1931 and 1935.

Upon partition in 1947, a total of 37 members of the class went to Pakistan. The other 76 remained in India.

== Preservation ==
| Working | Class | Number | Location | Built | Zone | Builders | Build no | Name |
|---|---|---|---|---|---|---|---|---|
| No | XA | 22046 | Parel Workshop, Mumbai | 1931 | CR | Vulcan Foundry | | |
| No | XA | 22002 | Railway Institute Chandausi | 1935 | NR | Vulcan Foundry | | |

== See also ==
- Rail transport in India#History
- History of rail transport in Pakistan
- Indian Railways
- Locomotives of India
- Pakistan Railways
