= Indian locomotive class WT =

Indian WT
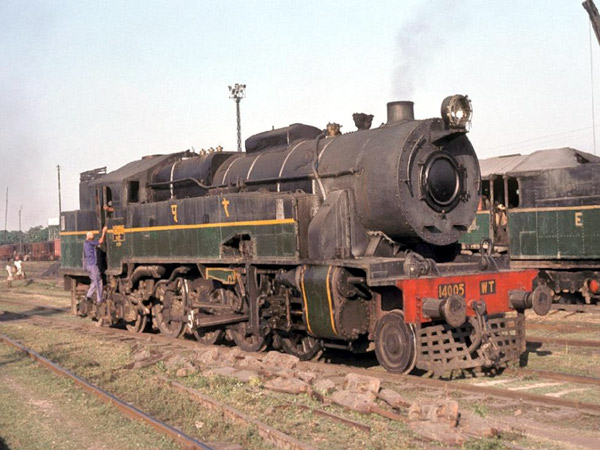
- WT 14005
Type and origin
- Power type: Steam
- Builder: Chittaranjan Locomotive Works
- Build date: 1959–1967
- Total produced: 30
Specifications
- Configuration
  - Whyte: 2-8-4T
  - UIC: 1′D2′h2t
- Gauge: 5 ft 6 in (1,676 mm)
- Driver dia.: 5 ft 7 in (1,702 mm)
- Fuel type: Coal
- Boiler pressure: 210 psi (1.45 MPa)
- Cylinders: Two, outside
- Cylinder size: 20 1/4 in × 28 in (514 mm × 711 mm)
- Valve gear: Walschaerts
Career
- Operators: Indian Railways
- Number in class: 30
- Numbers: 14000–14029
- Locale: Eastern Railways
- Disposition: All scrapped

The Indian locomotive class WT was a class of 2-8-4T heavy tank locomotives used on 5 ft 6 in (1,676 mm) broad-gauge lines in India from 1960. These locomotives were built to operate local trains in Eastern Railways zone on Howrah to Burdwan main line.

The thirty members of the WT class were designed in India, and built by Chittaranjan Locomotive Works, Chittaranjan, in Burdwan District, West Bengal, India. The first WT class locomotive rolled out of Chittaranjan Locomotive Works in March 1959 and was also named Chittaranjan.

== Class table ==
Table of orders and numbers
Year	Manufacturer	Serial Nos.	Qty	First Nos.	All-India Nos.	Notes
1959–1960	Chittaranjan		10		14000–14009	14000 named Chittaranjan
1965–1967	Chittaranjan		20		14010–14029	

== See also ==
- Rail transport in India § History
- Indian Railways
- Locomotives of India
- Rail transport in India
