= Indian locomotive class XS =

Indian XS
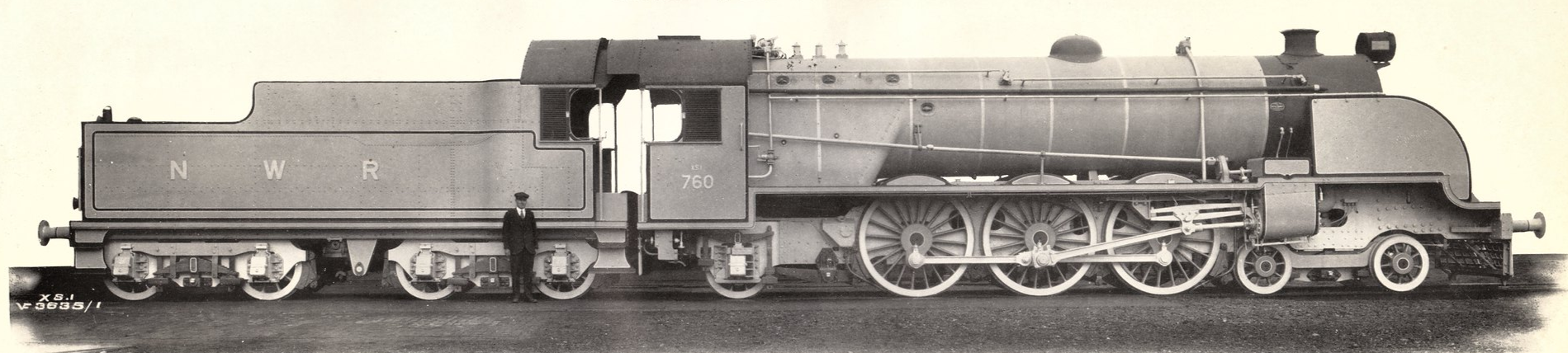
Type and origin
- Power type: Steam
- Builder: Vulcan Foundry
- Serial number: 4293–4296
- Build date: 1930
- Total produced: XS1: 2; XS2: 2
Specifications
- Configuration
  - Whyte: 4-6-2
  - UIC: 2′C1′ h4
- Gauge: 5 ft 6 in (1,676 mm)
- Driver dia.: 6 ft 2 in (1.880 m)
- Axle load: 21.5 long tons (21.8 t; 24.1 short tons)
- Loco weight: 108 long tons (110 t; 121 short tons)
- Tender weight: 64.15 long tons (65.18 t; 71.85 short tons)
- Fuel type: Coal
- Boiler pressure: 225 psi (1.55 MPa)
- Cylinders: Four (two inside and two outside)
- Cylinder size: 18 in × 26 in (457 mm × 660 mm)
- Valve gear: XS1: Caprotti; XS2: Lentz
Performance figures
- Tractive effort: 34,400 lbf (153.02 kN)
Career
- Operators: North Western Railway (British India); North Western Railway of Pakistan
- Number in class: XS1: 2; XS2: 2
- Numbers: XS1: 760, 761; XS2: 780, 781

The Indian locomotive class XS was a class of experimental four-cylinder 4-6-2 "Pacific" type steam locomotives used on 5 ft 6 in (1,676 mm) broad-gauge lines in British India, and then in post-partition Pakistan.

The four members of the class were built by Vulcan Foundry in Newton-le-Willows, Lancashire, England, in 1930. They were divided into two sub-classes, XS1 and XS2, each made up of two locomotives. Upon the partition of India in 1947, they all went to Pakistan.

== See also ==
- Rail transport in India § History
- History of rail transport in Pakistan
- Indian Railways
- Locomotives of India
- Pakistan Railways
