= Indian locomotive class WW =

Indian WW
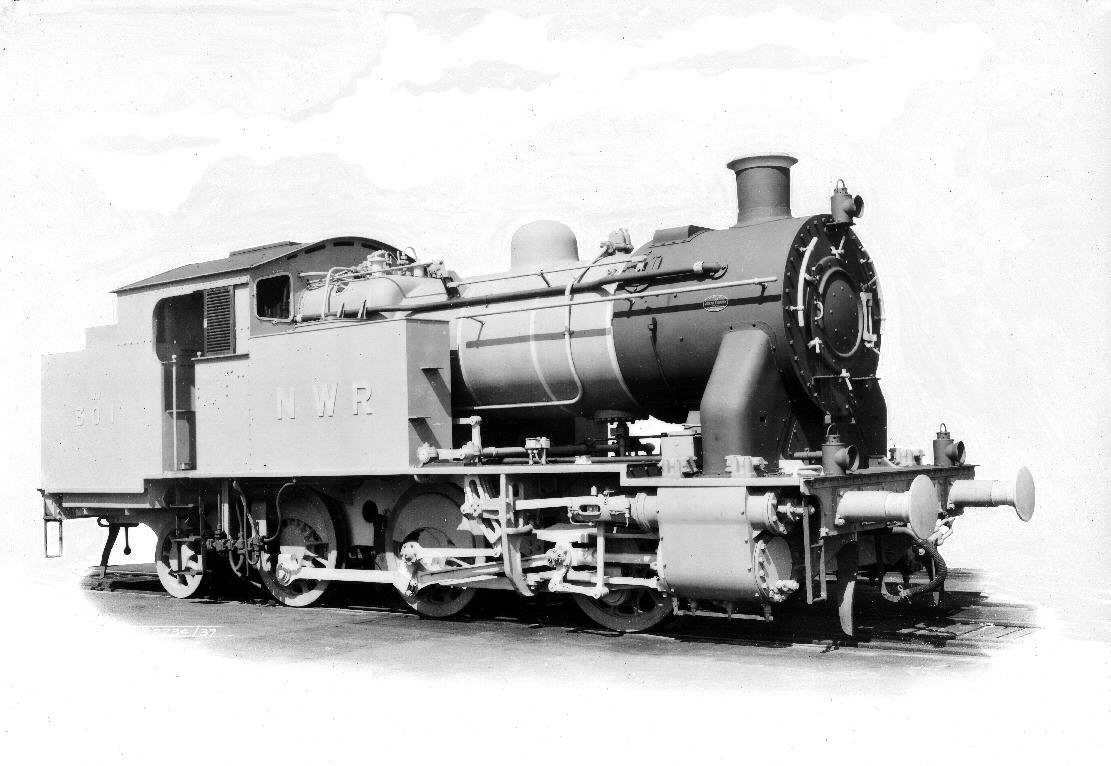
- Vulcan Foundry works photo of NWR no. 301.
Type and origin
- Power type: Steam
- Builder: Vulcan Foundry
- Serial number: 4791–4794
- Build date: 1940–1942
- Total produced: 4
Specifications
- Configuration
  - Whyte: 0-6-2T
  - UIC: C1′h2t
- Gauge: 5 ft 6 in (1,676 mm)
- Driver dia.: 4 ft 3 in (1,295 mm)
- Axle load: 16.5 long tons (16.8 t; 18.5 short tons)
- Loco weight: 65.85 long tons (66.91 t; 73.75 short tons)
- Fuel type: Coal
- Boiler pressure: 210 psi (1.45 MPa)
- Cylinders: Two, outside
- Cylinder size: 16 in × 22 in (406 mm × 559 mm)
- Valve gear: Walschaerts
Performance figures
- Tractive effort: 19,710 lbf (87.67 kN)
Career
- Operators: Indian Railways
- Number in class: 4
- Numbers: 15010–15013

The Indian locomotive class WW was a class of 0-6-2T tank locomotives used on 5 ft 6 in (1,676 mm) broad-gauge lines in India. The four members of the class were built by Vulcan Foundry in Newton-le-Willows, Lancashire, England, and completed in 1942.

== Class table ==
Table of orders and numbers
Year	Manufacturer	Serial nos.	Qty	First nos.	All-India nos.	Notes
1940–1942	Vulcan	4791–4794	4	301–304 (EPR)	15010–15013	

== See also ==
- Rail transport in India#History
- Indian Railways
- Locomotives of India
- Rail transport in India
