= Indian locomotive class YL =

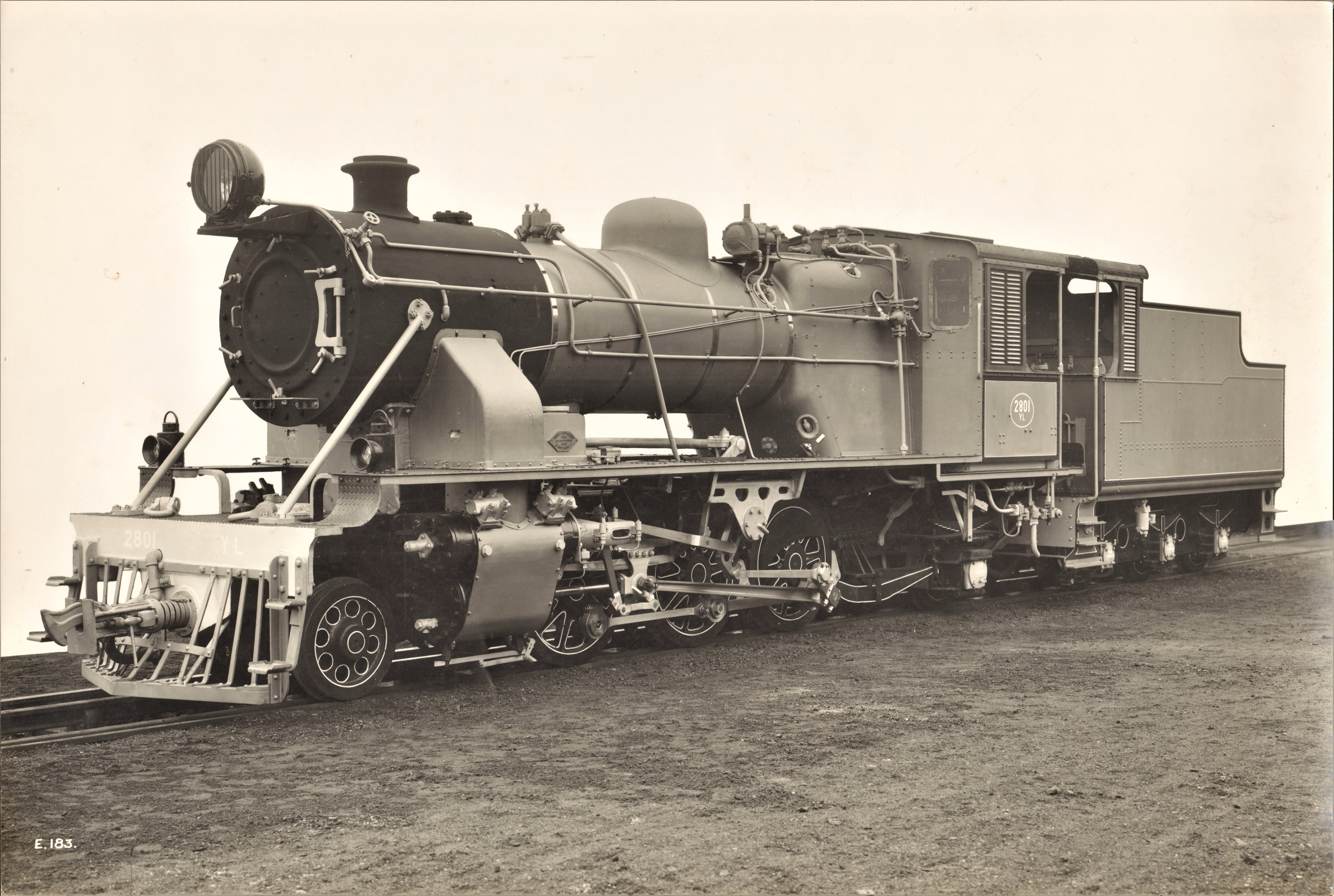
Type and origin
- Power type: Steam
- Builder: Henschel & Son; Hitachi; MÁVAG; Robert Stephenson and Hawthorns
- Build date: 1952–1957
- Total produced: 264
Specifications
- Configuration
  - Whyte: 2-6-2
- Gauge: 1,000 mm (3 ft 3 3/8 in)
- Coupled dia.: 1,092 mm (3 ft 7.0 in)
- Wheelbase
  - Engine: 6,680 mm (21 ft 11 in)
  - Coupled: 2,540 mm (8 ft 4 in)
  - incl. tender: 13,367 mm (43 ft 10.3 in)
- Length
  - Over buffers: 16,396 mm (53 ft 9.5 in)
- Axle load: 8 t (7.9 long tons; 8.8 short tons)
- Adhesive weight: 24 t (24 long tons; 26 short tons)
- Service weight: 38 t (37 long tons; 42 short tons)
- Firebox
  - Grate area: 1.67 m^{2} (18.0 sq ft)
- Boiler pressure: 14.5 bar (210 psi)
- Heating surface: 48.77 m^{2} (525.0 sq ft)
- Superheater
  - Heating area: 12.1 m^{2} (130 sq ft)
- Cylinders: Two, outside
- Cylinder size: 312 mm × 560 mm (12.3 in × 22.0 in)
- Valve gear: Walschaerts
Career
- Operators: Indian Railways

The Indian locomotive class YL were 2-6-2 locomotives built for Indian Railways' metre-gauge network as one of the standard designs developed post-partition from the Indian Railway Standard (IRS) design locomotives.

== History ==
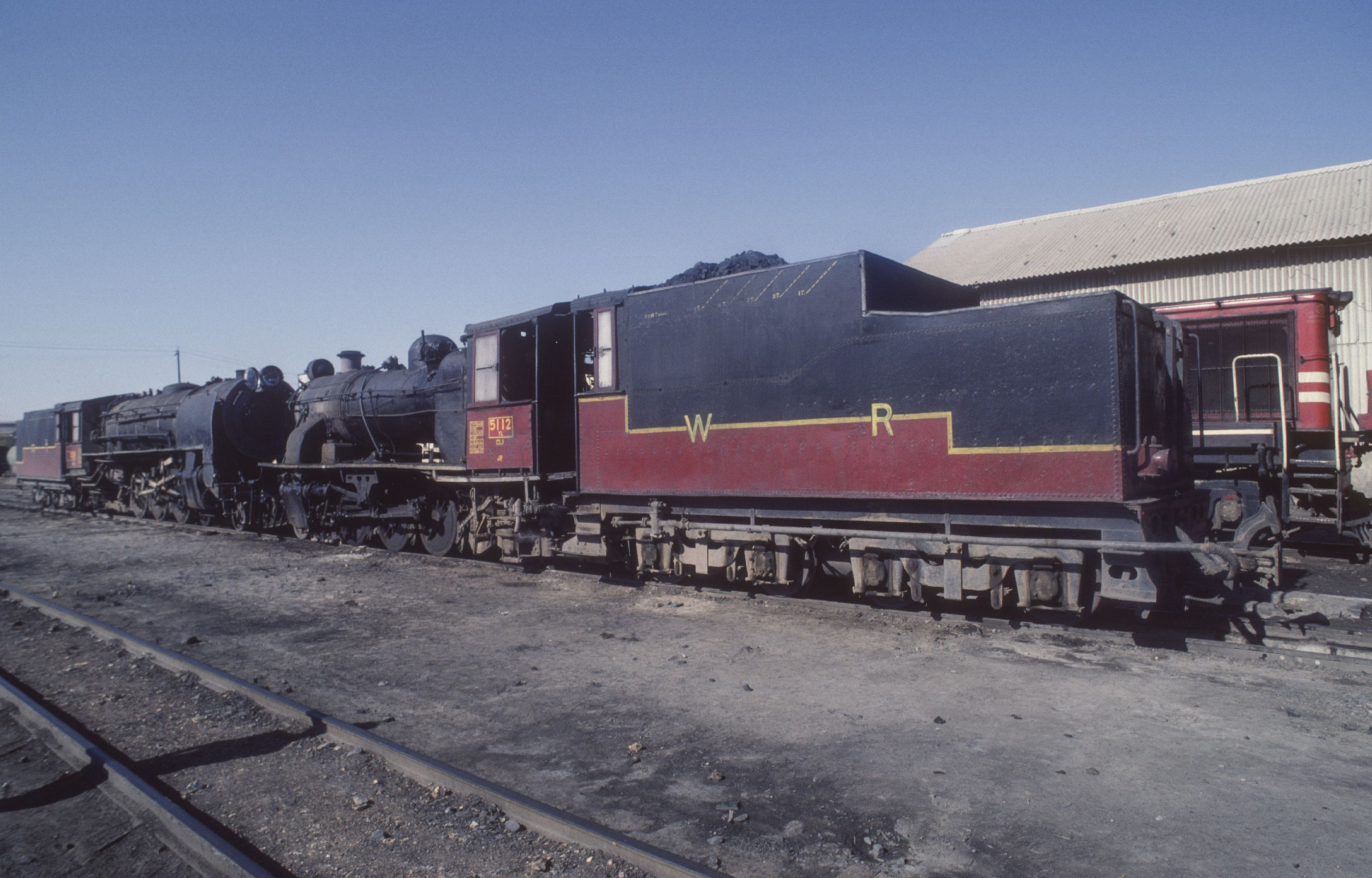
YL 5112 in Mhow, 1992

The YL class locomotives were designed for mixed service on branch lines as a successor to the class YF that were built from 1929 and 1938. A total of 264 members were built by locomotive manufacturers in West Germany, Japan, Hungary and the United Kingdom. They were relatively light, with a service weight of 38 tons and an eight-ton axle load.

Many were in use until the end of steam traction in the 1990s, with three surviving into preservation. Number 5001 is on static display at Gorakhpur railway station. Numbers 5000 and 5010 are stored in very poor condition at Indian Railways' own workshops in Izzatnagar near Bareilly.

== Builders and numbers ==
Builder	Year	Quantity	Serial number	Running number	1957 running number
Robert Stephenson and Hawthorns	1952	10	7434–7443	2801–2810	5000–5009
Hitachi	1956	63	12291–12353	2811–2873	5010–5072
MÁVAG	1957	40	7472–7511	2874–2913	5073–5112
Henschel & Sohn	1956	151	29381–29531	7000–7150	5113–5263

== Allocations ==
The YL class locomotives were mainly used in the north-east and west of India. By the end of 1976, all locomotives built were in service with the following regional zones of Indian Railways:

Regional zone	Quantity
Central Railways	6
Northern Railways	10
North Eastern Railways	130
Southern Railways	44
Western Railways	74
