= Indian locomotive class WCM-3 =

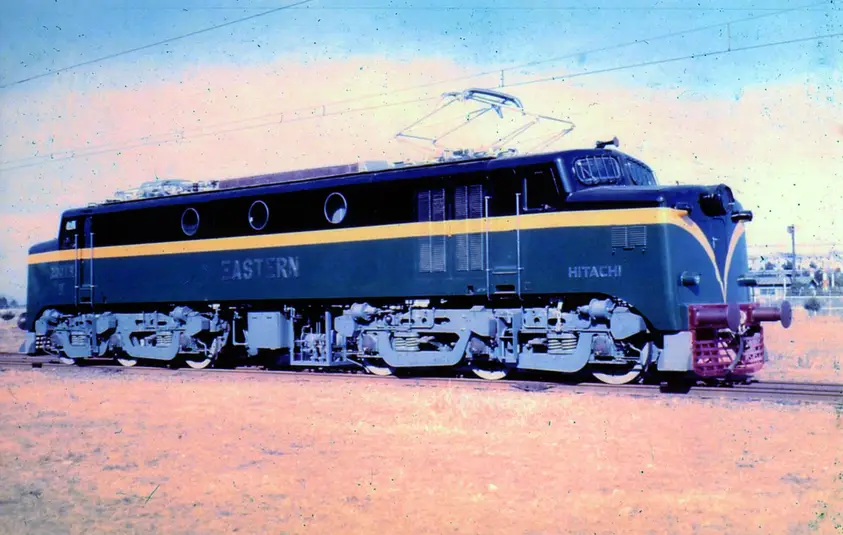
- Hitachi made WCM-3 branded for Eastern Railways
Type and origin
- Power type: Electric
- Designer: Hitachi
- Builder: Hitachi
- Order number: 55/459/18RE
- Model: EM/3
- Build date: 1958
- Total produced: 3
- Rebuilder: Research Design and Standards Organisation
- Rebuild date: 1960–1961
- Number rebuilt: 3
Specifications
- Configuration
  - AAR: C-C
  - UIC: Co′Co′
  - Commonwealth: Co-Co
- Gauge: 5 ft 6 in (1,676 mm)
- Bogies: 3-Axle Cast Steel frame, Swing bolster with Equalizer beams
- Wheel diameter: New: 1,200 mm (3 ft 11 in), Half worn: 1,182 mm (3 ft 10 1/2 in) and Full worn: 1,114 mm (3 ft 8 in)
- Wheelbase: 2,426 mm (8 ft 0 in)
- Length
  - Over couplers: 19.583 m (64 ft 3 in)
  - Over body: 18.313 m (60 ft 1 in)
- Width: 3.199 m (10 ft 5 15/16 in)
- Height: 4.264 m (13 ft 11 7/8 in)
- Frame type: 3-Axle Cast Steel frame
- Axle load: 19.11 tonnes (18.81 long tons; 21.07 short tons)
- Loco weight: 113.00 tonnes (111.22 long tons; 124.56 short tons)
- Sandbox cap.: 24 sandboxes, each with 63.5 Kg capacity
- Power supply: 110 V DC
- Electric system/s: Before conversion: 3.0 kV DC Overhead; After conversion: 1.5 kV DC Overhead
- Current pickup: Pantograph
- Traction motors: Hitachi HS-373-AR-16
  - Rating 1 hour: 330A
  - Continuous: 231A
- Gear ratio: 16:51
- MU working: Not possible
- Loco brake: Air/Hand
- Train brakes: Vacuum
- Compressor: 7.00 kg/cm²
- Safety systems: Slip man Control, Over voltage relay, No volt relay, Low pressure governor
Performance figures
- Maximum speed: 120.7 km/h (75 mph)
- Power output
  - Starting: Max: 3,610 hp (2,690 kW)
  - 1 hour: Max: 3,610 hp (2,690 kW)
  - Continuous: Max: 2,460 hp (1,830 kW)
- Tractive effort
  - Starting: 28,200 kgf (280 kN)
  - 1 hour: 16,900 kgf (170 kN)
  - Continuous: 10,220 kgf (100 kN)
- Factor of adh.: 25
Career
- Operators: Indian Railways
- Class: EM/3
- Numbers: 20073-20076
- Locale: Eastern Railways (1958-1961); Central Railways (1961-1995)
- Delivered: 1958
- First run: ER: 1958; CR: 1961
- Last run: January 1995
- Retired: March 1995
- Scrapped: After 1995
- Disposition: All scrapped

The Indian locomotive class WCM-3 was a class of 3 kV DC, later 1.5 kV DC electric locomotives that were developed in 1958 by Hitachi for Indian Railways. The model name stands for broad gauge (W), Direct Current (C), Mixed traffic (M) engine, 3rd generation (3). They entered service in 1958. A total of 3 WCM-3 locomotives were built in Japan in 1958.

The WCM-3 served both passenger and freight trains for nearly forty years. With the introduction of more modern types of locomotives and 25 KV AC electrification, all three were withdrawn in the mid-1990s after repeated failures, and were subsequently scrapped.

== History ==
The history of WCM-3 begins in the late 1950s with the stated aim of the Indian Railways (IR) to remove steam locomotives working on the Eastern Railway (ER) after recommendation of Karnail Singh Fuel Committee. In the late 1950s the Kolkata Suburban Railway was established and electrified with overhead 3000 V DC supply. So Indian Railways began to look at various designs.

Initially, Indian railways invited tenders to build locomotives to the new specification. The following responses were received:

- Hitachi submitted their model with Co-Co bogies, 3600 horsepower rating, and a top speed of 105 km/h.
- Vulcan Foundry and English Electric submitted a similar model with 3120 hp and a top speed of 105 km/h.

Each company submitted their prototypes and Indian Railways designated these prototypes as the WCM-3 class and WCM-2 class respectively.

Indian Railways decided to procure three 3000 V DC electric locomotives from Hitachi. They are manufactured in Japan and shipped to India in 1958, where they were initially designated as the class EM/3. These locomotives were the third mixed-traffic electric locomotives to roam in India and also had the now-common Co-Co wheel arrangement. They were easily recognizable with their smaller size and separate light enclosures for the marker lights and the tail lamps (just above the buffers). They had their cab doors placed near the cab unlike the WCM-1 class.

The WCM-3 were first used on trains in the Kolkata suburban section, painted in a black livery with a red lining in the middle. Their initial role, however, was short-lived, as by 1960 the Kolkata Suburban Railway was converted to 25 kV AC, rendering the relatively new WCM-3s unusable. The Research Design and Standards Organisation (RDSO) decided to convert the WCM-3 locomotives to run on the 1500 V DC power supply used in Central Railway (CR) without loss of power.

After their transferral to Central Railways in 1961, the WCM-3 locomotives were used on many express trains, but had some problems and were relegated to hauling low speed passenger trains, shunting and freight duties only. In the mid-1990s Central Railways decided to withdraw these locomotives from service and all 3 units were scrapped with none preserved.

== Former sheds ==
- Pune
- Kalyan (KYN)

All the locomotives of this class has been withdrawn from service.

== See also ==
- Rail transport in India § History
- Indian Railways
- Locomotives of India
- Rail transport in India
