= Visakhapatnam–Tirupati Double Decker Express =

Train in India

Visakhapatnam Junction – Tirupati AC Double Decker Express
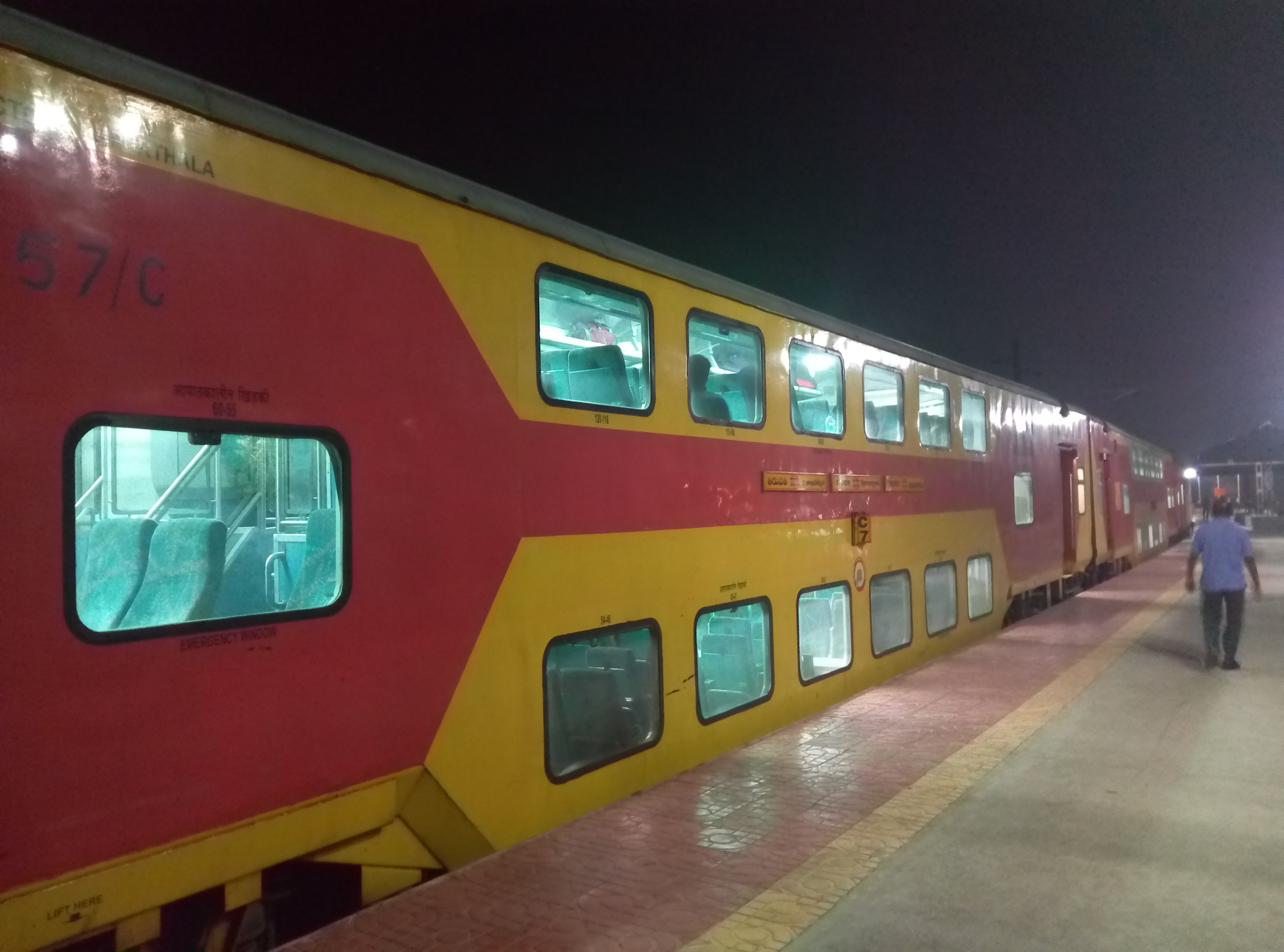
- Tirupati - Visakhapatnam Double Decker Express

Overview
- Service type: Double Decker Express
- Locale: Andhra Pradesh
- First service: December 31, 2016; 9 years ago
- Current operator: South Coast Railways

Route
- Termini: Tirupati (TPTY); Visakhapatnam (VSKP)
- Stops: 16
- Distance travelled: 761 km (473 mi)
- Average journey time: 13 hrs 10 min
- Service frequency: Tri-weekly
- Train number: 22707 / 22708

On-board services
- Seating arrangements: Yes
- Sleeping arrangements: No
- Catering facilities: On-board Catering
- Observation facilities: Large windows

Technical
- Rolling stock: LHB Double Decker
- Track gauge: 1,676 mm (5 ft 6 in)
- Operating speed: 58 km/h (36 mph) average with halts
Route map
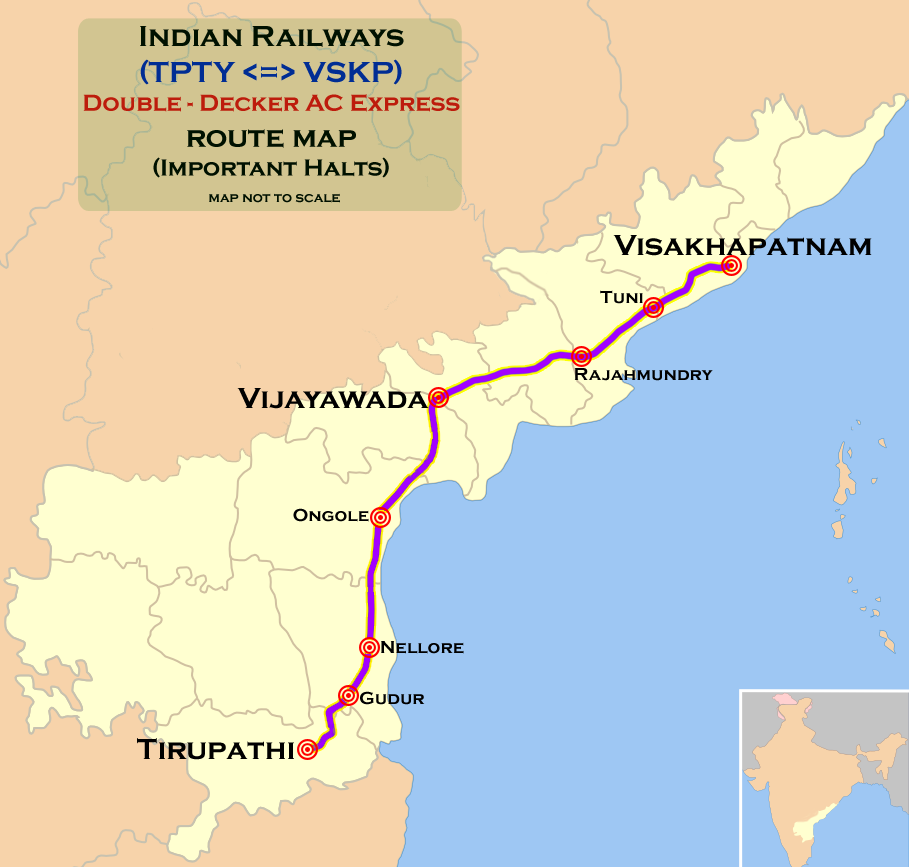

The 22707 / 22708 Visakhapatnam – Tirupati AC Double Decker Express is a superfast train belonging to South Coast Railway connecting Visakhapatnam and Tirupati both in the Indian state of Andhra Pradesh. as of now it is the only overnight intercity express operated in Indian Railways network and it is the longest operational Double Decker express of Indian Railways.

Previously this train was introduced between Kacheguda (Hyderabad)–Guntur Junction section as Guntur–Kacheguda AC Double Decker Express & Kacheguda (Hyderabad)–Tirupati section as Kacheguda–Tirupati Double Decker Express, but both trains were not successful on those routes due to low commuter traveling. So this train was canceled on those routes and transferred on a busy and profitable route i.e. Visakhapatnam - Tirupati section.

== Stoppages ==
This train stops at Duvvada, Anakapalle, Tuni, Samalkot Jn, Rajahmundry, Tadepalligudem, Eluru, Vijayawada Junction, New Guntur, Tenali Jn, Chirala, Ongole, Nellore, Gudur Jn, Sri Kalahasti & Renigunta Jn.

== Coach composition ==
The train has 9 AC Chair cars, 2 power cars (Total 11 coaches)

| | 1 | 2 | 3 | 4 | 5 | 6 | 7 | 8 | 9 | 10 | 11 | 12 |
|---|---|---|---|---|---|---|---|---|---|---|---|---|
| 22707 | | EOG | M1 | M2 | M3 | M4 | M5 | C1 | C2 | C3 | C4 | EOG |
| 22708 | | EOG | C4 | C3 | C2 | C1 | M5 | M4 | M3 | M2 | M1 | EOG |

== Schedule ==
The schedule of this 22707/22708 Visakhapatnam - Tirupati AC Double Decker Express is given below:-

VSKP - TPTY - VSKP AC Double Decker Express
| 22707 | | | Stations | 22708 | | |
|---|---|---|---|---|---|---|
| Days | Arrival | Departure | Stations | Arrival | Departure | Days |
| 1 | -NIL- | 23:00 | Visakhapatnam Junction | 10:30 | -NIL- | 2 |
| 1 | 23:23 | 23:25 | Duvvada | 09:43 | 09:45 | 2 |
| 1 | 23:34 | 23:35 | Anakapalle | 08:58 | 09:00 | 2 |
| 2 | 00:24 | 00:25 | Tuni | 08:03 | 08:05 | 2 |
| 2 | 01:08 | 01:10 | Samalkot Junction | 07:13 | 07:15 | 2 |
| 2 | 02:03 | 02:05 | Rajahmundry | 06:33 | 06:35 | 2 |
| 2 | 02:48 | 02:50 | Tadepalligudem | 05:53 | 05:55 | 2 |
| 2 | 03:18 | 03:20 | Eluru | 05:18 | 05:20 | 2 |
| 2 | 04:50 | 05:00 | Vijayawada Junction | 04:15 | 04:25 | 2 |
| 2 | 05:38 | 05:40 | New Guntur | 03:23 | 03:25 | 2 |
| 2 | 06:24 | 06:25 | Tenali Junction | 02:48 | 02:50 | 2 |
| 2 | 07:14 | 07:15 | Chirala | 01:58 | 02:00 | 2 |
| 2 | 07:49 | 07:50 | Ongole | 01:23 | 01:25 | 2 |
| 2 | 09:09 | 09:10 | Nellore | 23:53 | 23:55 | 1 |
| 2 | 09:58 | 10:00 | Gudur Junction | 23:23 | 23:25 | 1 |
| 2 | 10:59 | 11:00 | Sri Kalahasti | 22:35 | 22:37 | 1 |
| 2 | 11:28 | 11:30 | Renigunta Junction | 22:13 | 22:15 | 1 |
| 2 | 12:20 | -NIL- | Tirupati | -NIL- | 21:55 | 1 |

== Traction ==
earlier was WAP-4. It is hauled by a Lallaguda based WAP 7 and WAP-5 locomotive on its entire journey.
