= Indian locomotive class WM =

Indian WM
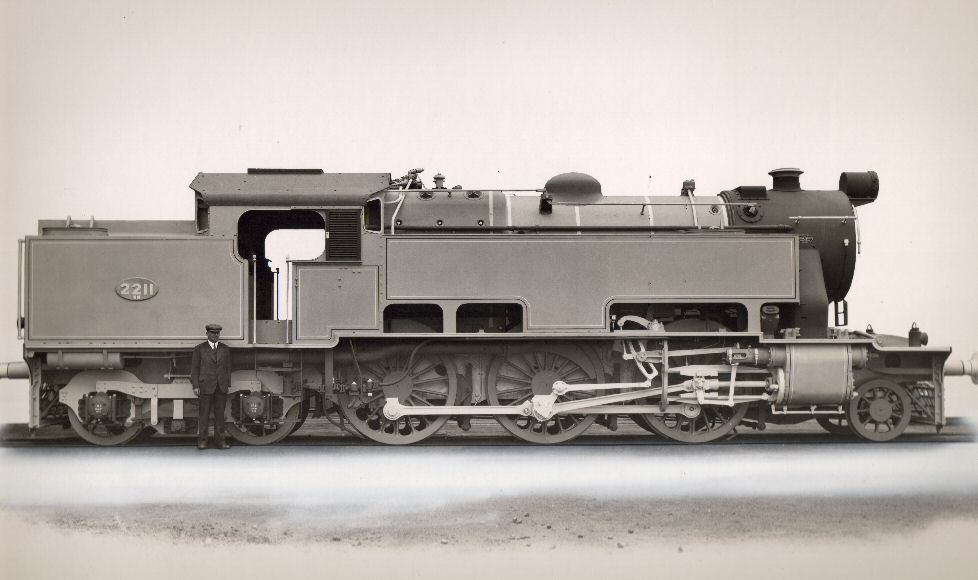
- Vulcan Foundry works photo of EIR no. 2211.
Type and origin
- Power type: Steam
- Builder: Vulcan Foundry (40 (+4 ex WV)); Robert Stephenson and Hawthorns (30)
- Build date: 1939, 1951, 1953, 1954
- Total produced: 70 new; 4 ex WV
Specifications
- Configuration
  - Whyte: 2-6-4T
  - UIC: 1′C2′h2t
- Gauge: 5 ft 6 in (1,676 mm)
- Driver dia.: 5 ft 7 in (1,702 mm)
- Axle load: 16.25 long tons (16.51 t; 18.20 short tons)
- Loco weight: 96.6 long tons (98.2 t; 108.2 short tons)
- Fuel type: Coal
- Fuel capacity: 6.5 long tons (6.6 t; 7.3 short tons)
- Water cap.: 3,000 imp gal (14,000 L; 3,600 US gal)
- Firebox
  - Grate area: 24.6 sq ft (2.29 m^{2})
- Boiler pressure: 210 psi (1.45 MPa)
- Heating surface: 965 sq ft (89.7 m^{2})
- Superheater
  - Type: AX pattern (21 A-type elements)
  - Heating area: 230 sq ft (21 m^{2})
- Cylinders: Two, outside
- Cylinder size: 16 in × 28 in (406 mm × 711 mm)
- Valve gear: Walschaerts
Performance figures
- Tractive effort: 19,100 lbf (84.96 kN)
- Factor of adh.: 5.68
Career
- Operators: Indian Railways
- Number in class: 70 + 4
- Numbers: 13000–13073

The Indian locomotive class WM was a class of 2-6-4T tank locomotives used on 5 ft 6 in (1,676 mm) broad-gauge lines in India from 1942. A total of 70 of them were delivered new, and another four were converted from existing class WV engines.

The ten prototypes of the WM class, the first 30 production units, and the four WV class locomotives that were later converted to WMs, were built by Vulcan Foundry in Newton-le-Willows, Lancashire, England. The remaining 30 WM class engines were built by Robert Stephenson and Hawthorns in North East England.

== Class table ==
Table of orders and numbers
Year	Manufacturer	Serial nos.	Qty	First nos.	All-India nos.	Notes
1939	Vulcan	4795–4804	10	2210–2214 (EIR); 2300–2304 (GIPR)	13000–13009	Prototypes
1951	Vulcan	6096–6125	30	9001–9030	13010–13039	
1953–1954	Robert Stephenson and Hawthorns	7706–7735	30	9301–9369	13040–13069	
1939	Vulcan	4787–4790	4	26954–26957	13070–13073	Converted from WV

== See also ==
- Rail transport in India § History
- Indian Railways
- Locomotives of India
- Rail transport in India
