= Midland Railway 1102 Class =

Midland Railway 1102 class
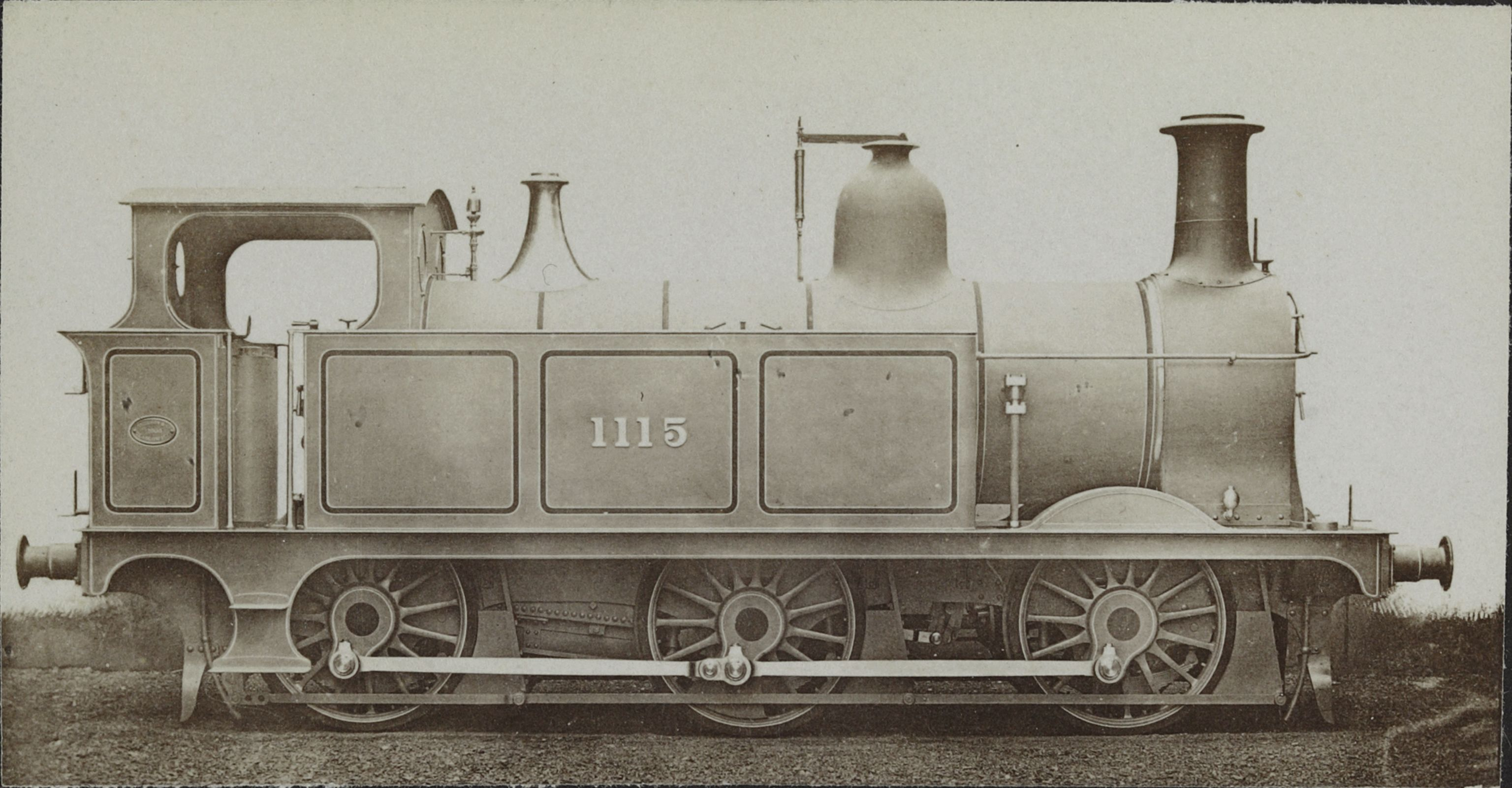
Type and origin
- Power type: Steam
- Designer: S. W. Johnson
- Builder: Neilson & Co. (25); Vulcan Foundry (15)
- Serial number: Neilson: 1901–1910, 1997–2011; Vulcan: 756–770
- Build date: 1874–1876
- Total produced: 40
Specifications
- Configuration
  - Whyte: 0-6-0T
  - UIC: C n2t
- Gauge: 1,435 mm (4 ft 8 1/2 in)
- Driver dia.: 4 ft 6 in (1.372 m)
- Wheelbase
  - Engine: 15 ft 0 in (4.572 m)
  - Drivers: 7 ft 4 in (2.235 m) +; 7 ft 8 in (2.337 m)
- Loco weight: 39 long tons 6 cwt (39.9 t)
- Fuel type: Coal
- Firebox
  - Type: Round-top
- Boiler
  - Model: Midland Railway class A
  - Diameter: 4 ft 1 in (1.245 m)
  - Tube plates: 10 ft 0 in (3.048 m)
- Boiler pressure: 160 lbf/in^{2} (1.10 MPa)
- Heating surface: 1,035 sq ft (96.2 m^{2})
- Cylinders: Two, inside
- Cylinder size: 17 in × 24 in (432 mm × 610 mm)
Career
- Operators: Midland Railway; London, Midland and Scottish Railway
- Numbers: New: 1102–1141; 1907: 1620–1656
- Withdrawn: 1920–1932

The Midland Railway 1102 Class was a class of 0-6-0T steam locomotives. Twenty-five were built by Neilson and Company in 1874–75 (Nos. 1102–1126) and fifteen by Vulcan Foundry in 1875–76 (Nos. 1127–1141). They were very similar to the subsequent 1377 Class.

The Midland 1907 numbers were 1620–1659. All but No. 1628 entered LMS stock in 1923, and were all withdrawn and scrapped by 1932.
