= Indian locomotive class WCM-2 =

Type and origin
- Power type: Electric
- Designer: Vulcan Foundry, English Electric
- Builder: English Electric, Vulcan Foundry
- Order number: 1205/5955/55
- Model: EM/2
- Build date: 1956–1957
- Total produced: 12
- Rebuilder: Research Design and Standards Organisation
- Rebuild date: 1960–1961
- Number rebuilt: 12
Specifications
- Configuration
  - AAR: C-C
  - UIC: Co′Co′
  - Commonwealth: Co-Co
- Gauge: 5 ft 6 in (1,676 mm)
- Bogies: 3 Axle fabricated frame, Swing bolster with Equalizer beams
- Wheel diameter: New: 1,092 mm (3 ft 7 in), Half worn: 1,055 mm (3 ft 5 1/2 in) and Full worn: 1,116 mm (3 ft 8 in)
- Wheelbase: 2,248 mm (7 ft 5 in)
- Length
  - Over couplers: 20.066 m (65 ft 10 in)
  - Over body: 18.745 m (61 ft 6 in)
- Width: 3.245 m (10 ft 7 3/4 in)
- Height: 4.293 m (14 ft 1 in)
- Frame type: 3 Axle fabricated frame
- Axle load: 18.80 tonnes (18.50 long tons; 20.72 short tons)
- Loco weight: 112.80 tonnes (111.02 long tons; 124.34 short tons)
- Sandbox cap.: 24 sandboxes each with 63.5 kg capacity
- Power supply: 110 V DC
- Electric system/s: Before conversion: 3.0 kV DC Overhead; After conversion: 1.5 kV DC Overhead
- Current pickup(s): pantograph
- Traction motors: E.E.531A
  - Rating 1 hour: 286A
  - Continuous: 260A
- Gear ratio: 16:62
- MU working: Not possible
- Loco brake: Air/Hand
- Train brakes: Vacuum
- Compressor: 7.03 kg/cm^{2}
- Safety systems: Over voltage relay, No volt relay, Low pressure governor, Vacuum governor Train parting alarms, and Brake cylinder cutoff valve
Performance figures
- Maximum speed: 120.5 km/h (75 mph)
- Power output
  - Starting: Max: 3,120 hp (2,330 kW)
  - 1 hour: Max: 3,090 hp (2,300 kW)
  - Continuous: Max: 2,810 hp (2,100 kW)
- Tractive effort
  - Starting: 31,298 kgf (310 kN)
  - 1 hour: 14,000 kgf (140 kN)
  - Continuous: 12,300 kgf (120 kN)
- Factor of adh.: 25
Career
- Operators: Indian Railways
- Class: EM/2
- Numbers: 20175-186
- Nicknames: BlueBird
- Locale: Eastern Railways (until 1961); Central Railways (from 1961)
- Delivered: 1956-1957
- First run: 1957 (ER); 1961 (CR)
- Last run: January 2000
- Retired: March 2000
- Withdrawn: April 2001
- Preserved: none
- Scrapped: Feb 28, 2005
- Disposition: All scrapped.

The Indian locomotive class WCM-2 was a class of 3 kV DC, later 1.5 kV DC electric locomotives that was developed in 1956 by Vulcan Foundry and English Electric for Indian Railways. The model name stands for broad gauge (W), Direct Current (C), Mixed traffic (M) engine, 2nd generation (2). They entered service in 1957. A total of 12 WCM-2 locomotives were built in England between 1956 and 1957.

The WCM-2 served both passenger and freight trains for over 40 years. With the introduction of more modern types of locomotives and 25 KV AC electrification, all were withdrawn in the early 2000s after repeated failures, and have since been scrapped.

== History ==
The WCM-2 were designed in the mid 1950s with the intent for the Indian Railways (IR) to remove steam locomotives working on the Eastern Railway (ER) after recommendation of Karnail Singh Fuel Committee. In the late 1950s the Kolkata Suburban Railway was established and electrified with overhead 3000 V DC supply. Therefore, Indian Railways began to look at various designs.

Indian Railways initially invited tenders to build locomotives to the new specification, receiving the following responses:

- Vulcan Foundry and English Electric submitted their model with 3120 hp with top speed of 105 km/h.
- Hitachi submitted their model with 3600 hp with top speed of 105 km/h. They also had Co-Co bogies

Each company submitted their prototypes and Indian Railways designated these prototypes as the WCM-2 class and WCM-3 class respectively.

Indian Railways decided to procure seven 3000 V DC electric locomotives from English Electric and Vulcan Foundry, the latter previously supplied steam locomotives to India. They were manufactured in England and shipped to India in 1956-1957. These locomotives were the second mixed-traffic class of electric locomotives to roam in India and also had the now-common Co-Co wheel arrangement. Initially the WCM-2 class were known as EM/2 class. They were easily recognizable with their huge size and round smooth noses. They had their cab doors placed near the cab unlike the WCM-1 class.

The WCM-2 were first used on trains in the Kolkata suburban section, painted in a black livery with a red lining in the middle. However, this was short-lived, as by 1960 the Kolkata Suburban Railway was converted to 25 kV AC voltage, rendering both the WCM-2 and WCM-3 locomotives surplus to requirements. The Research Design and Standards Organisation (RDSO) decided to put the relatively new WCM-2s and WCM-3s into second use, by converting them to run on the 1500 V DC power supply used in the Central Railway zone (CR) without loss of power.

After their transferal to Central Railways in 1961, the WCM-2 locomotives were put to work on many express trains, such as the Deccan Queen and the Indrayani Express, but rarely used on freight service. In the mid 1990s, the ageing WCM-2s began to fail regularly, causing disruptions to train services. Central Railways decided to withdraw these locomotives from service and by 2000, all units were withdrawn.

== Former sheds ==
- Pune
- Kalyan (KYN)

All the locomotives of this class has been withdrawn from service.

== See also ==
- Rail transport in India#History
- Indian Railways
- Locomotives of India
- Rail transport in India
