= Howrah–Dhanbad Double Decker Express =

Train in India

Howrah–Dhanbad AC Double Decker Express
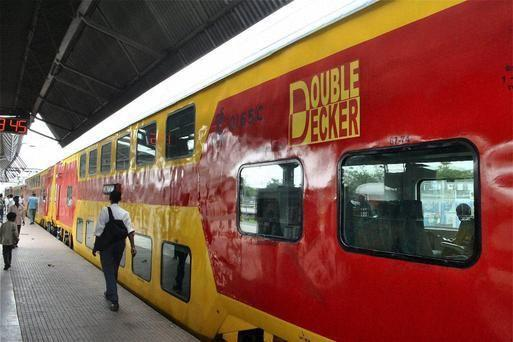

Overview
- Service type: Express Double-Decker
- Status: Discontinued
- Locale: West Bengal & Jharkhand
- First service: 1 October 2011; 15 years ago
- Last service: 8 November 2016; 9 years ago
- Current operator: Eastern Railways

Route
- Termini: Howrah Junction (HWH); Dhanbad Junction (DHN)
- Stops: 5
- Distance travelled: 257 km
- Average journey time: 4 hrs 15 mins
- Service frequency: All Days Except Sunday
- Train number: 12385/12386

On-board services
- Class: AC Chair Car
- Seating arrangements: Available
- Catering facilities: Available (paid)
- Observation facilities: LHB coach
- Baggage facilities: Available

Technical
- Track gauge: 1,676 mm (5 ft 6 in)
- Electrification: Yes
- Operating speed: Average – 60 km/h Maximum – 110 km/h

The 12385 / 12386 Howrah – Dhanbad Double Decker Express was an air conditioned superfast double-decker train of Indian Railways that use to connect the capital city of West Bengal, Kolkata to the city of Dhanbad, also known as the Coal Capital of India, in Jharkhand. It was the first air conditioned double-decker train of Indian Railways.

== Service ==
The 12385 Double Decker Express used to operate between Howrah and Dhanbad every day except Sunday. This train covered the 257 km journey from Howrah to Dhanbad in 4 hours and 15 minutes, maintaining an average speed of 61 km/h and a maximum permissible speed of 110 km/h. On its return journey, the 12386 Double Decker Express covered the same distance in 4 hours and 10 minutes, averaging 62 km/h. The 12385 Howrah – Dhanbad Double Decker Express departed from Howrah Railway Station at 08:35 hrs and arrived at Dhanbad at 12:50 hrs. For the return trip, the train left Dhanbad at 18:30 hrs and reached Howrah at 22:40 hrs. Along the way, it made stops at Barrdhaman Junction, Durgapur, Asansol, Barakar, and Kumardubi.

The coaches of this train were designed by the research arm of the Indian Railways, Research Design and Standard Organization (RDSO) and were manufactured in the state of the art, Rail Coach Factory, Kapurthala. The newly designed coaches had several features namely stainless steel body, high-speed Eurofima design bogies with air springs and fire safety-features and control discharge toilet system. The train had five AC Double Decker coaches (C1 to C5) and two End on Generation Card (Power Cars). Similar to the other double decker trains, it had bi-level sitting arrangement with 120 passenger sitting capacity.

== Traction and Haulage ==
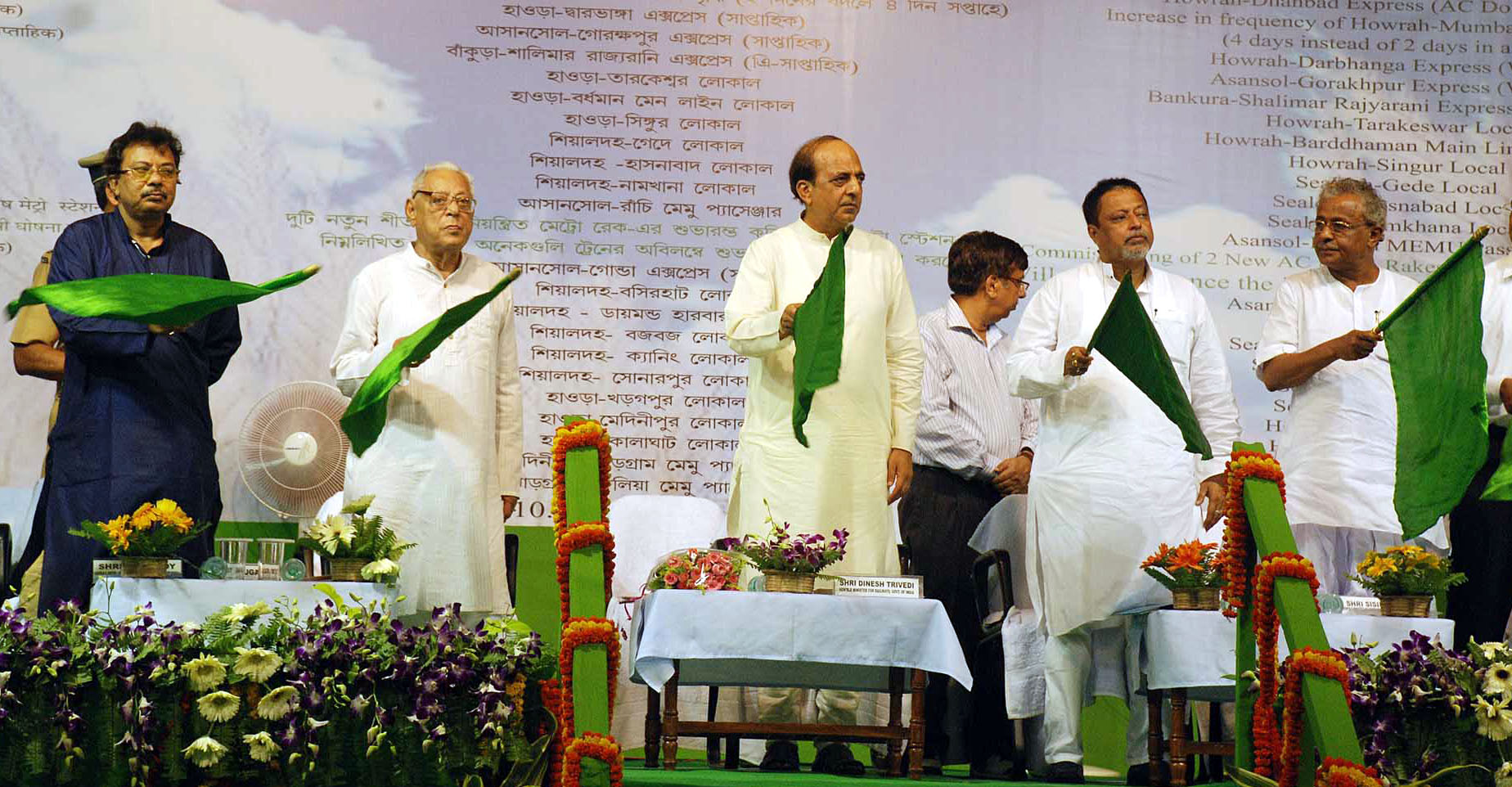
The former Railway Minister, Dinesh Trivedi, accompanied by Mukul Roy, former Minister of State for Railways, flagging of the AC Double Decker Express at Howrah Railway Station on 1 October 2011.

The train was hauled by the Howrah Electric Loco Shed based WAP-4 electric locomotive or WAP-7 electric locomotive from end to end. On certain occasion, Gomoh based WAP-7 could also be seen hauling the train.

== Challenges and Discontinuation ==
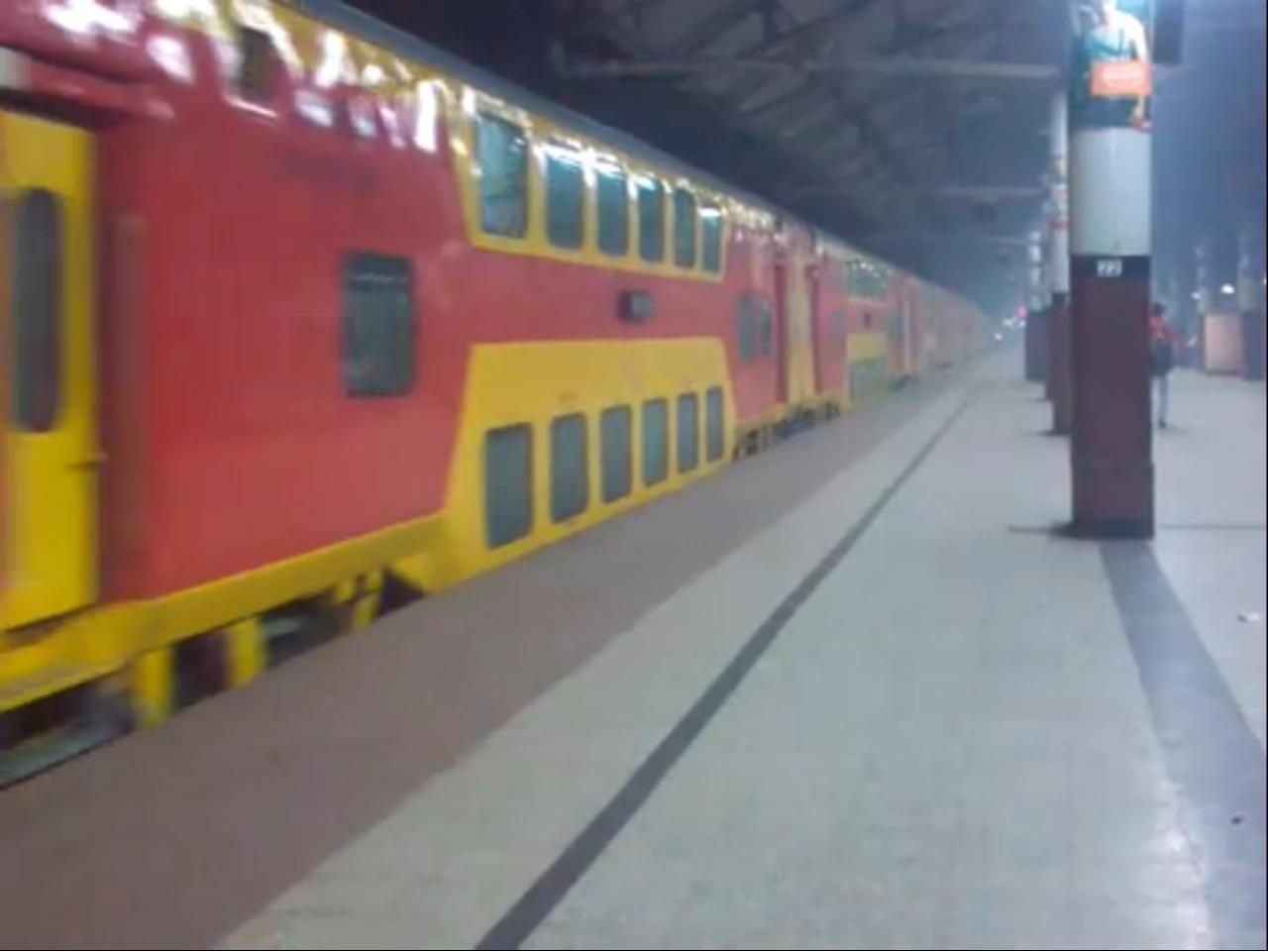
12386 Dhanbad - Howrah Double Decker Express standing on the platform of Howrah Railway Station, after completing its journey

The train was introduced with the aim of catering to affluent or economically well-off commuters traveling between Kolkata and Dhanbad, providing an alternative to the popular Howrah – Ranchi Shatabdi Express. However, since its inception, the train failed to attract a positive response from passengers and consequently experienced very low ridership. This was primarily because the Ranchi Shatabdi departs from Howrah early in the morning at 06:05 hrs and reaches Dhanbad at 09:23 hrs, which is nearly an hour after the departure of the Double Decker Express from Howrah Railway Station. Additionally, other more economical options, such as the Black Diamond Express, arrive at Dhanbad station at least an hour before the Double Decker Express. As a result, the average occupancy of the Double Decker Express remained between 15% and 20%, significantly below the minimum threshold of 40-45% required for the train's operation.

Moreover, aside from poor passenger patronage, the train encountered several technical challenges. The newly designed Double Decker LHB coaches were wider than conventional LHB coaches, resulting in scratching against platform edges during trials and causing deep scratch marks on the train's exterior. Consequently, on the recommendation of the Commission of Railway Safety (CRS), platforms at all the stations along the train's route had to be shortened to accommodate this issue. Close to 20 such railway stations were modified in accordance to the same, thereby causing much inconvenience to the commuters and posing technical challenges for utilities situated on the platform edges. Additionally, due to the increased height of the coaches, the overhead equipment (OHE) wires were too close to the train. To address this, the OHEs were raised along the track designated for the Double Decker train's journey from Howrah to Dhanbad.

Therefore, on 1 January 2016, Eastern Railway (ER) temporarily suspended the train due to poor passenger patronage. However, the train briefly resumed service between 23 October and 8 November 2016, as the 02385 / 02386 Howrah – Dhanbad Double Decker Special Fare Chhath Puja Special to accommodate the surge in passengers during the Chhath Puja festival. During this time, Eastern Railway officials indicated that Indian Railways was considering reintroducing the train with new schedules between Dhanbad and Howrah. Unfortunately, after the last run of the Special Fare train on 8 November 2016, the train was not reinstated and was permanently cancelled.

== See also ==
- Kolkata Duronto
- Delhi Duronto
- Howrah–New Jalpaiguri Shatabdi Express
- Bhagalpur–Anand Vihar Terminal Garib Rath Express
