= Indian locomotive class WV =

Indian WV
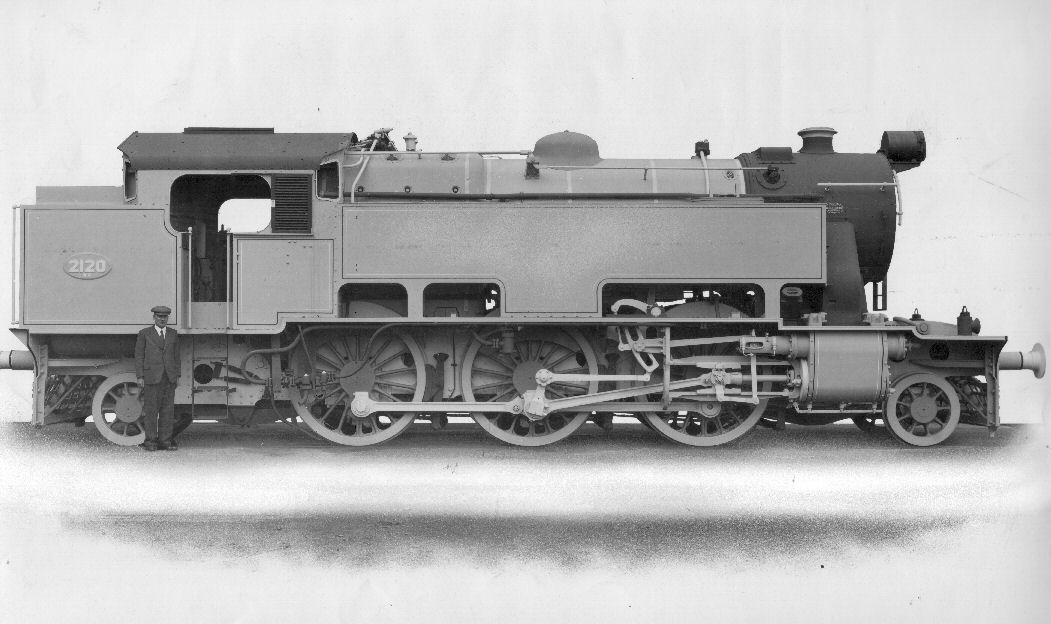
- Vulcan Foundry works photo of EIR no. 2120.
Type and origin
- Power type: Steam
- Builder: Vulcan Foundry
- Serial number: 4787–4790
- Build date: 1939–1942
- Total produced: 4
Specifications
- Configuration
  - Whyte: 2-6-2T
  - UIC: 1′C1′h2t
- Gauge: 5 ft 6 in (1,676 mm)
- Driver dia.: 5 ft 7 in (1.702 m)
- Fuel type: Coal
- Water cap.: 3,000 imp gal (14,000 L; 3,600 US gal)
- Boiler pressure: 210 psi (1.45 MPa)
- Cylinders: Two, outside
- Cylinder size: 16 in × 28 in (406 mm × 711 mm)
- Valve gear: Walschaerts
Career
- Operators: East Indian Railway Company; Indian Railways
- Number in class: 4
- Numbers: EIR: 2120–2123; IR: 26954–26957; (WM): 13070–13073
- Disposition: Rebuilt as WM class

The Indian locomotive class WV was a class of 2-6-2Ts used on 5 ft 6 in (1,676 mm) broad-gauge lines in India.

The four members of the class were built by Vulcan Foundry in Newton-le-Willows, Lancashire, England, and completed in 1942. They were later converted into class WM engines, which were 2-6-4Ts.

== Class table ==
Table of orders and numbers
| Year | Manufacturer | Serial nos. | Qty | First nos. | All-India nos. | Notes |
|---|---|---|---|---|---|---|
| 1939–1942 | Vulcan | 4787–4790 | 4 | 2120–2123 | 26954–26957 | Later converted to WM 13070–13073 |

== See also ==
- Rail transport in India#History
- Indian Railways
- Locomotives of India
- Rail transport in India
