= Double Decker Express =

Series of Indian two-level trains

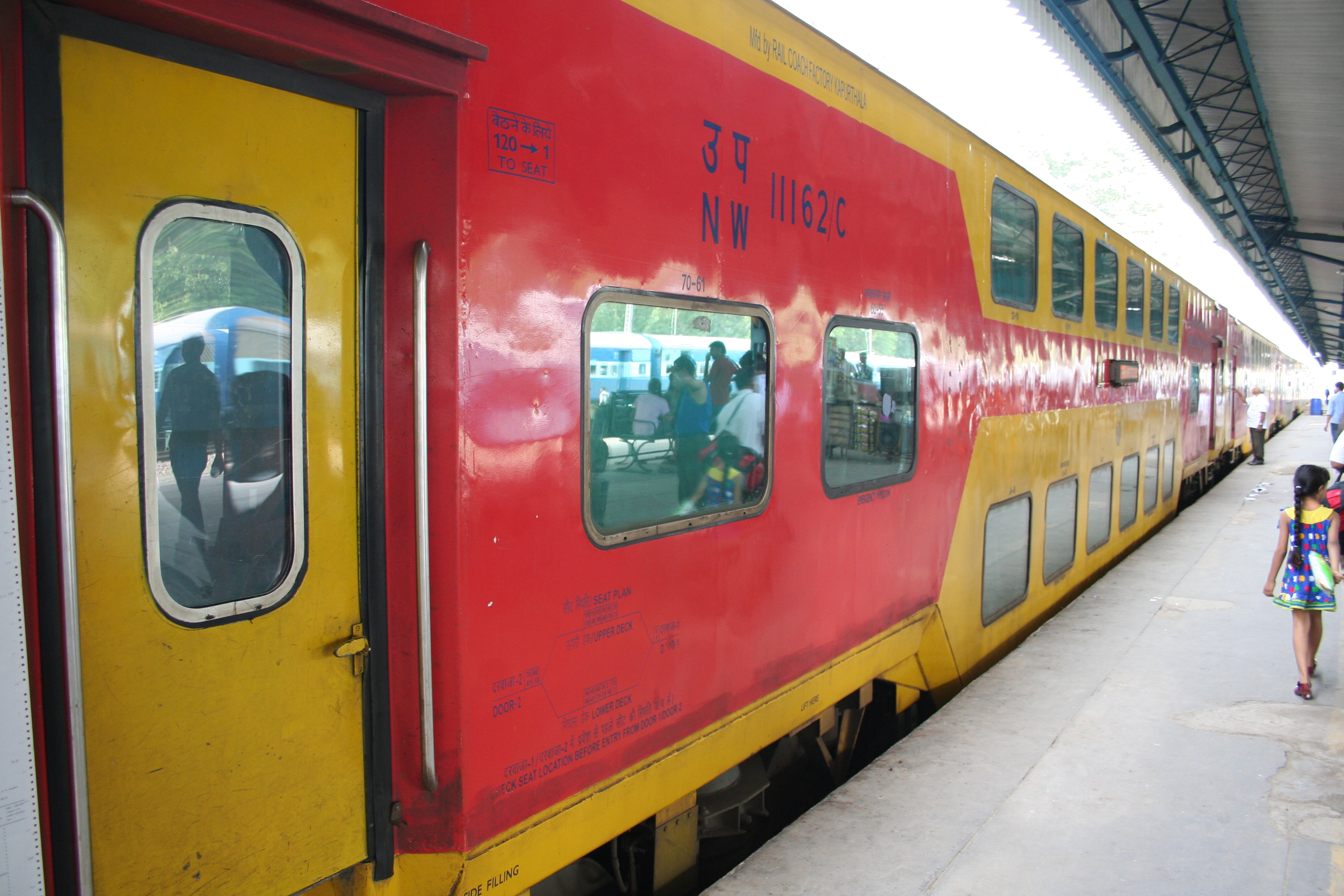
- Jaipur–Delhi Sarai Rohilla AC Double Decker Express at Delhi Sarai Rohilla

Overview
- Service type: Superfast
- System: 7
- Status: Operational on 7 routes
- Locale: Uttar Pradesh, New Delhi, Maharashtra, Gujarat, Tamil Nadu, Karnataka, Andhra Pradesh, Rajasthan
- Predecessor: Flying Ranee
- First service: 1979; 47 years ago (first double-deck trains); 1 October 2011; 14 years ago (Howrah–Dhanbad train became the first air-conditioned Double Decker Express)
- Successor: Uday Express
- Current operator: Indian Railways
- Website: https://indianrail.gov.in

Route
- Line used: 7

On-board services
- Classes: Non-AC and AC Chair Car coaches
- Seating arrangements: Yes
- Sleeping arrangements: No
- Catering facilities: On-board Catering and E-Catering
- Observation facilities: Large windows in all carriages, Services operated by both state and corporate operators.
- Entertainment facilities: Electric outlets
- Baggage facilities: Overhead racks
- Other facilities: Bio-vacuum toilets Fire & Smoke detection and many more

Technical
- Rolling stock: LHB Double Decker ICF Double Decker
- Track gauge: 1,676 mm (5 ft 6 in) broad gauge
- Electrification: 25 kV AC at 50 Hz
- Operating speed: 130 km/h (81 mph)

Double Decker Express are a series of trains started by Indian Railways for shorter routes in order to serve more people than a traditional chair car carriage.

The Howrah–Dhanbad Double Decker Express was the first of its type to be introduced.

== Rake ==
Double Decker Express are composed of bi-level seating arrangements for passengers with seating capacity of 120 seats, divided into lower deck, upper deck and mezzanine seating area. The old Double Decker were non AC ICF coaches. In 2011, new fully-AC Stainless Steel LHB Double Decker were introduced in India. Stainless Steel LHB Coaches built at Kapurthala Coach Factory are utilized for AC Double Decker trains.

== Traction ==
All Double Decker Express trains pulled by all locomotive genre (motive power) like diesel and electric are WAP-4, WAP-5, WAP 7, WCAM-3, WDP-4, WDM-3A and WDM-3D

== AC Double Decker Services ==
Currently operational train list
Train no.	Route	Distance
12931/12932	Mumbai Central–Ahmedabad Double Decker Express	491 km
22625/22626	Chennai–Bangalore Double Decker Express	359 km
12583/12584	Lucknow Junction–Anand Vihar Terminal Double Decker Express	479 km
12985/12986	Jaipur–Delhi Sarai Rohilla AC Double Decker Express	304 km
22707/22708	Visakhapatnam–Tirupati Double Decker Express	761 km

=== UDAY Express ===
In 2018, a new generation of Double Decker Express trains were introduced in Indian Railways named as UDAY Express - Utkrisht Double Decker Air Conditioned Yatri Express trains, designed by RDSO. The coaches of these trains have an anti-graffiti vinyl wrapped exterior and have been given a bright color scheme of yellow, orange and pink - somewhat similar to that of the Tejas Express. The UDAY express was envisioned as a premium train service for business travelers. According to Indian Railways, Uday Express will cater to the "busiest routes" and increase carrying capacity by 40%. These trains have airline styled seating with a capacity of 120 passengers per coach (50 for upper deck, 48 for lower deck and 22 on the ends) as compared to Shatabdis which can seat up to 78. These coaches are also equipped with WiFi infotainment system, have information screens just like Humsafar Express and have small dining area in coaches. Uday Express can run at a maximum speed of 110 km/h and an average speed of 62 km/h.

==== Services ====
The first service was launched on 10 June 2018 between Coimbatore Junction and Bangalore having halts at Krishnarajapuram, Kuppam, Salem Jn, Erode Jn, Tiruppur Jn and Coimbatore Jn. The second service was launched on 26 September 2019 between Visakhapatnam and Vijayawada with 7 stops en route, and was later extended till Guntur.

Train no.	Train name	Distance	Frequency	Zone
22665/22666	KSR Bengaluru–Coimbatore Uday Express	419 km Daily	Daily	Southern Railway zone
22701/22702	Visakhapatnam–Guntur Uday Express	384 km	5 days a week except Thu, Sun	South Coast Railway zone

== Defunct AC Double Decker Services ==
Formerly operational train list
Train no.	Route	Distance	Notes
11085/11086 & 11099/11100	Lokmanya Tilak Terminus–Madgaon AC Double Decker Express	592 km	Discontinued
22117/22118	Guntur–Kacheguda AC Double Decker Express	287 km	Cancelled
22183/22184	Habibganj–Indore Junction AC Double Decker Express	259 km	Discontinued due to low occupancy.
12385/12386	Howrah–Dhanbad Double Decker Express	263 km	This train was the first AC Double Decker train in India. The train was stopped and discontinued after 8 November 2016 due to many challenges, low occupancy and poor performance.
22119/22110	Kacheguda–Tirupati Double Decker Express	636 km	Cancelled

== Defunct Non-AC Double Decker Services ==
Formerly operational train list
Name	Train no.	Route	Distance	Notes
Sinhagad Express	11009/11010	Mumbai CSM Terminus–Pune	192 km	First train to have double deck rake in India. About ten coaches were attached but were removed eventually.
Deccan Queen Superfast Express	12123/12124	Mumbai CSM Terminus–Pune	192 km	Used to haul Double Decker bogies during 1980s but were eventually removed.
Deccan Express	11007/11008	Mumbai CSM Terminus–Pune	192 km	One or two Double Decker coaches were added. This did not last for long and the coaches were removed.
Sahyadri Express	11023/11024	Mumbai CSM Terminus – Kolhapur	518 km	Hauled Double Decker coaches between Mumbai and Pune and vice versa. But today has Single Decker coaches only.
Panchvati Express	12109/12110	Mumbai CSM Terminus–Manmad	258 km	This train used to haul Non-AC Double Decker bogies in the 1990s.
Mumbai–Pune Passenger	—	Mumbai CSM Terminus–Pune	192 km	This train used to haul Double Decker bogies. This train has been shut down due to introduction of Mumbai CST–Sainagar Shirdi Fast Passenger / Mumbai CST–Pandharpur Fast Passenger / Mumbai CSMT–Vijapura Fast Passenger.
Flying Ranee	12921/12922	Mumbai Central–Surat	263 km	This train lost its double-decker coaches when it was upgraded to run with a new LHB rake in July 2023.
Mumbai Central–Valsad Fast Passenger	59023/59024	Mumbai Central–Valsad	195 km	This train's double-decker coaches were retired and replaced with conventional ICF coaches on 5 January 2025.

== See also ==
- AC Superfast Express
- Mumbai–Ahmedabad high-speed rail corridor
- Vande Bharat Express
- Humsafar Express
- Antyodaya Express
- Uday Express
- Tejas Express
- Mahamana Express
- Gatimaan Express
- Rajdhani Express
- Shatabdi Express
- Jan Shatabdi Express
- Sampark Kranti Express
- Jan Sadharan Express
- Garib Rath Express
- Duronto Express
- Rajya Rani Express
- Kavi Guru Express
- Vivek Express
- Yuva Express
