= Midland Railway 1377 Class =

British steam locomotive class (1878–1965)

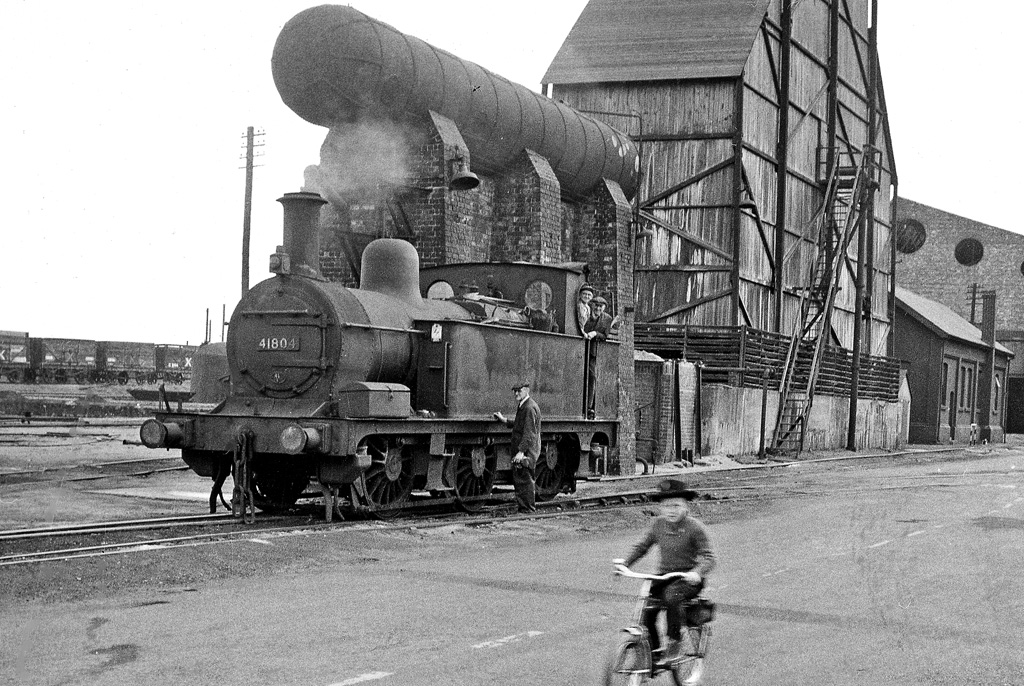
- 41804 at Staveley Ironworks, August 1963
Type and origin
- Power type: Steam
- Designer: Samuel W. Johnson
- Builder: Derby Works (165); Vulcan Foundry (20)
- Build date: 1878–1892
- Total produced: 185
Specifications
- Configuration
  - Whyte: 0-6-0T
  - UIC: C n2t
- Gauge: 4 ft 8 1/2 in (1,435 mm) standard gauge
- Driver dia.: 4 ft 7 in (1.397 m)
- Wheelbase
  - Axle spacing (Asymmetrical): 7 ft 4 in (2.235 m) +; 7 ft 8 in (2.337 m)
- Loco weight: 39.55 long tons (40.18 t; 44.30 short tons)
- Fuel type: Coal
- Boiler: MR type A
- Boiler pressure: 175 lbf/in^{2} (1.21 MPa)
- Cylinders: Two, inside
- Cylinder size: 17 in × 24 in (432 mm × 610 mm)
Performance figures
- Tractive effort: 15,005 lbf (66.75 kN) or 16,080 lbf (71.53 kN)
Career
- Operators: Midland Railway; → London, Midland and Scottish Railway; → British Railways
- Class: MR: 1377
- Power class: BR: 1F
- Withdrawn: 1927–1965
- Disposition: One preserved, remainder scrapped

The Midland Railway 1377 Class was a class of 185 0-6-0T tank locomotives. They were introduced in 1878 by Samuel W. Johnson, and were almost identical to the 1102 class of 1874; the latter having fully enclosed cabs, while the 1377 class were built without a rear to the cab and only a short cab roof, hence their nickname "half-cabs". They were given the power classification 1F.

== Construction history ==
Up to 1891, 185 were built: 165 by Derby Works and the last 20 by the Vulcan Foundry. Originally they were built with type A boilers with round-topped fireboxes, but many later received type G5 boilers with Belpaire fireboxes.

Table of orders and numbers
Original No.	1907 (& LMS) No.	Manufacturer	Works Nos.	Qty	Year	Notes
1377–1386	1660–1669	Derby Works	(order no. 202)	10	1878	
1387–1396	1670–1679	Derby Works	(order no. 218)	10	1878	
1347–1356	1680–1689	Derby Works	(order no. 218)	10	1879	
1420–1427, 220, 221	1690–1699	Derby Works	(order no. 239)	10	1879	
1410–1419	1700–1709	Derby Works	(order no. 262)	10	1880	
1552–1561	1710–1719	Derby Works	(order no. 340)	10	1882	Originally built as "1552 Class" variant with cut-down boiler mountings and cab.
210–212, 215, 216, 218, 219, 1397–1399	1720–1729	Derby Works	(order no. 414)	10	1883	
1677–1686	1730–1739	Derby Works	(order no. 496)	10	1884	
1090–1092, 1094, 1095	1740–1744	Derby Works	(order no. 496)	5	1884	
1687–1696	1745–1754	Derby Works	(order no. 499)	10	1884	
1096–1100	1755–1759	Derby Works	(order no. 499)	5	1885	
200, 201, 213, 214, 217, 222, 223, 1093, 1101, 1431	1760–1769	Derby Works	(order no. 824)	10	1889–90	
1843–1847	1770–1774	Derby Works	(order no. 854)	10	1890	
85–87, 11, 14	1775–1779	Derby Works	(order no. 854)	10	1890	Renumbered 1102–1106 in 1891
203, 1848–1852, 1973–1976	1780–1789	Derby Works	(order no. 854)	10	1890	
1977–1981	1790–1794	Derby Works	(order no. 943)	5	1890	
880–889	1795–1804	Derby Works	(order no. 883)	10	1890	
1982–1991	1805–1814	Derby Works	(order no. 968)	10	1891	Originally built as "1552 Class" variant with cut-down boiler mountings and cab.
1992, 1107–1115	1815–1824	Derby Works	(order no. 991)	10	1891	
1993–2012	1825–1844	Vulcan Foundry	1355–1374	20	1892	

== Service history ==
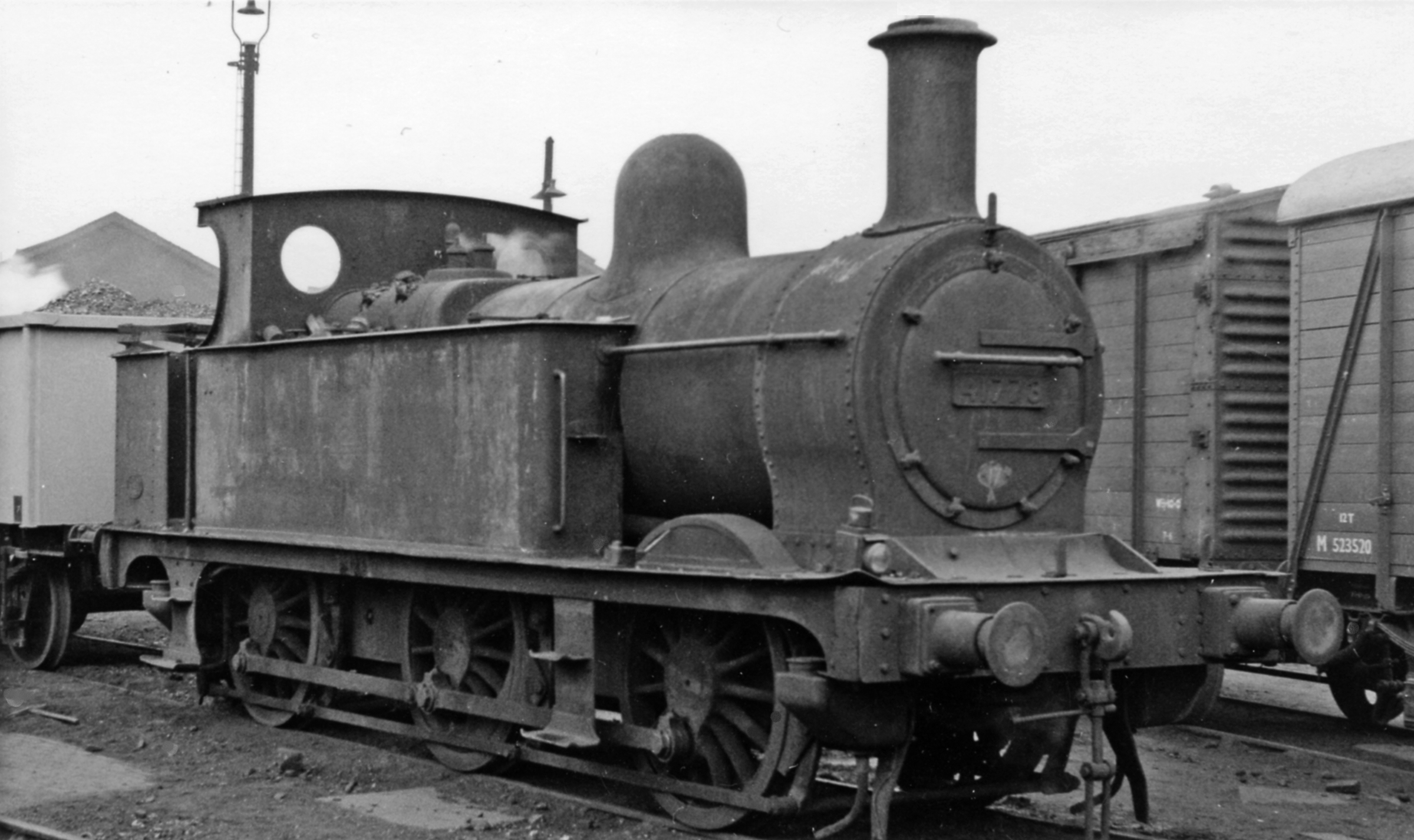
No. 41773, condemned at Derby Locomotive Depot 13 April 1960

All 185 passed to the London, Midland and Scottish Railway (LMS) at the grouping in 1923. Withdrawals started in 1927 and 72 locomotives passed into British Railways ownership in 1948, having 40000 added to their LMS numbers, although 14 were withdrawn before being applied. Withdrawals continued and by 1961 only 11 remained; the last five were withdrawn in September 1965. The class had only lasted so long because the Midland Railway had signed a contract in 1866 to provide shunting engines to Staveley Ironworks for 100 years; at the time the 1Fs were the only locomotives suitable for this duty.

Beyond their work with the Midland Railway, LMS and British Railways, six members of this class - 1666, 1708, 1751, 1788, 1839 and 1890 - were requisitioned by the War Department during World War II between 1940 and 1944, to operate the Melbourne Military Railway (MMR) in South Derbyshire. No. 1839 was replaced by No. 1773 during its time on the MMR.

Table of withdrawals
Year	Quantity in service at start of year	Quantity withdrawn	Locomotive numbers	Notes
1927	185	1	1791	
1928	184	1	1684	
1929	183	0	–	
1930	183	13	1673, 1701/07/22–23/37/44/74/84, 1801/21/28/43	
1931	170	5	1677, 1729/87, 1800/08	
1932	165	53	1663/67/75/80/83/85/87–88/97–98, 1703/09/15–16/19/21/28/31–32/35–36/41/50/56–58, 1760/62/64–65/71/76/83/86/90/92/97–98, 1806–07/09/12–13/15/17/19–20/22–23/31/34/37/40	1831 rebuilt as diesel shunter
1933	112	15	1662/78/89/93, 1704–05/33/61/72/75/82/89, 1825/36/41	10 reinstated: 1756/62/71/97, 1807/13/15/17/19–20
1934	107	3	1679/92, 1766	
1935	104	5	1669/91/94, 1717/46	
1936	99	3	1696, 1730, 1817	
1937	96	4	1665, 1796, 1819/30	
1938	92	5	1670, 1740/99, 1807/27	
1939	87	2	1743, 1832	
1940–5	85	0	–	
1946	85	6	1681, 1742/51/55/71, 1816	
1947	79	7	1700/38/78/85, 1802/10/15	
1948	72	8	1668/74, 1714/18/59/62, 1818/42	
1949	64	4	1676, 1756/68/88	
1950	60	0	–	
1951	60	6	1690, 1781, 41745/67/93, 41824	
1952	54	4	41727/94, 41820/29	
1953	50	6	41660/64/66/95, 41770/80	
1954	44	5	41711/47, 41811/13/33	
1955	39	5	41671–72/82, 41713/25	
1956	34	8	41686, 41720/77, 41805/14/26/38–39	
1957	26	7	41699, 41706/10/48/53/79, 41803	
1958	19	2	41724/52	
1959	17	4	41661, 41726/95/97	
1960	13	2	41754/73	
1961	11	0	–	
1962	11	3	41702/49/69	
1963	8	1	41739	
1964	7	2	41712, 41844	
1965	5	5	41708/34/63, 41804/35	

== Conversion ==
In 1931, the frames of 1831 were used for LMS diesel shunter 1831. This was an experimental diesel (one of the first diesel locomotives on the LMS' network) and was intended for shunting work within railway yards, but it wasn't successful when it was put into service in 1932. The locomotive was later put into storage in 1936 and officially withdrawn from service in September 1939. It was converted to a mobile power unit (an MPU3) in November 1940 and ultimately scrapped in August 1951.

== Preservation ==
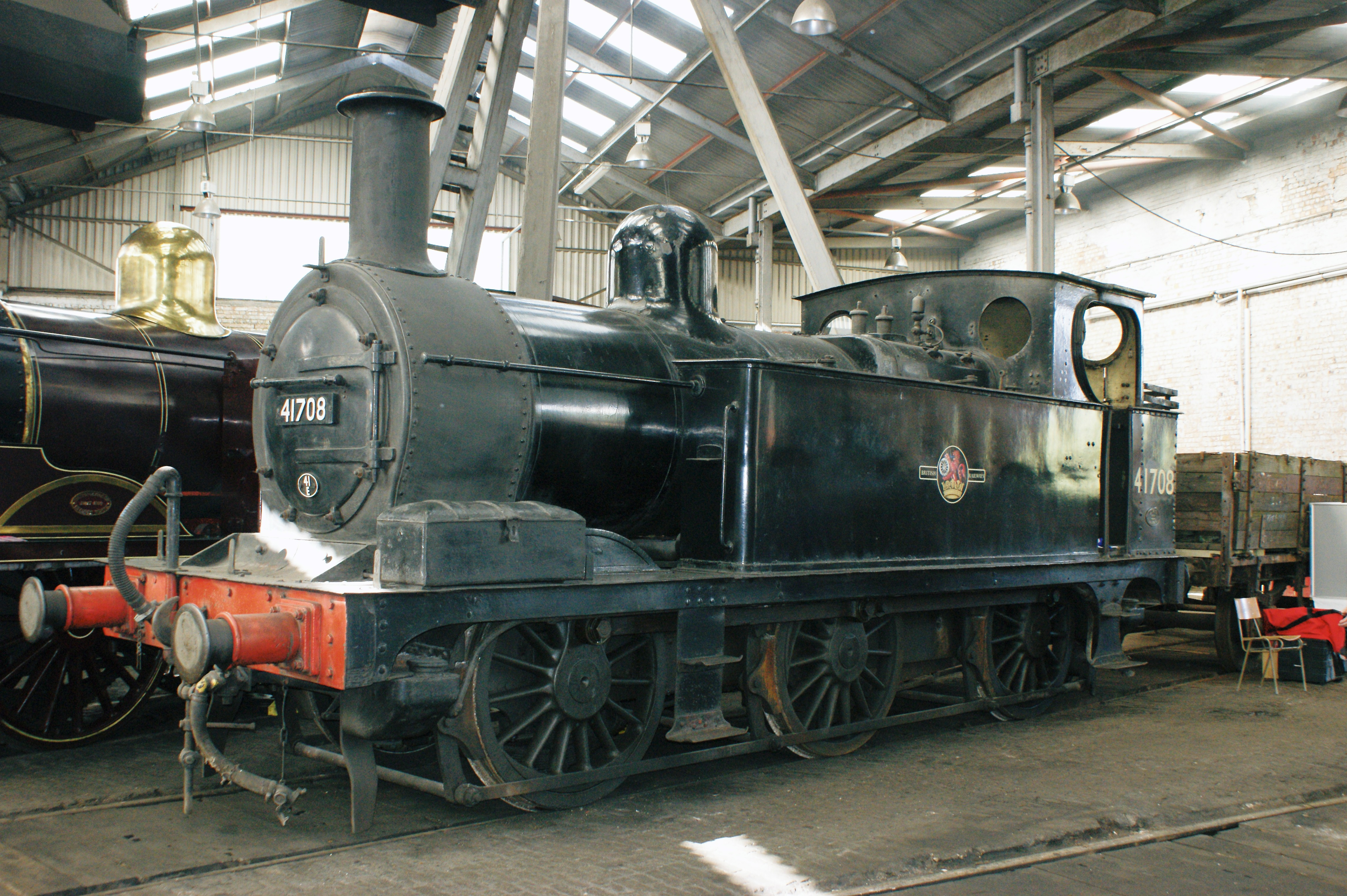
41708 at Barrow Hill

One of the Staveley engines, 1418 (renumbered 1708 by the Midland Railway in 1907, and 41708 by British Railways), is preserved at Barrow Hill Engine Shed, previously at the Midland Railway - Butterley, the Keighley & Worth Valley Railway, and the Swanage Railway respectively. Sometime during 1994 while visiting the Dean Forest Railway, No. 41708 was renumbered and ran as No. 41720. This change was rectified by 1997. This engine became the inspiration for the Bachmann Branchline OO scale model of the class introduced in 2014. The model, the dispute and the class had an extensive write up in Model Rail during 2014. Barrow Hill began restoring the locomotive to working order in November 2020.
