= Bhopal–Indore AC Double Decker Express =

AC train service

Overview
- Current operator: Indian Railways

Route
- Termini: Bhopal Junction; Indore Junction
- Stops: 5
- Distance travelled: 263 km
- Average journey time: 4 hrs 15 min
- Service frequency: Daily
- Train number: 22185 down / 22186 up

On-board services
- Class: AC Chair Car
- Seating arrangements: Yes
- Sleeping arrangements: No
- Catering facilities: No pantry car attached
- Observation facilities: Rake sharing with 22183 / 84 Habibganj–Indore Junction AC Double Decker Express

Technical
- Rolling stock: Standard Indian Railways coaches
- Track gauge: 1,676 mm (5 ft 6 in)
- Operating speed: 61 km/hour down, 59 km/hour up
Route map
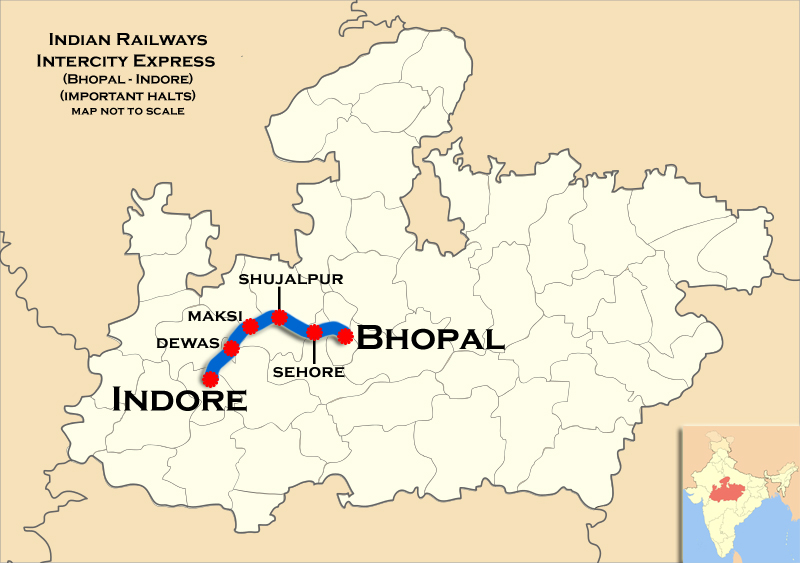

Bhopal–Indore AC Double Decker Express (22185 down / 22186 up) was a Superfast AC train service, connecting Bhopal to Indore, both within the state of Madhya Pradesh. It covered 224 kilometres between Bhopal Junction and Indore Junction in around 4 hours .

== Features ==
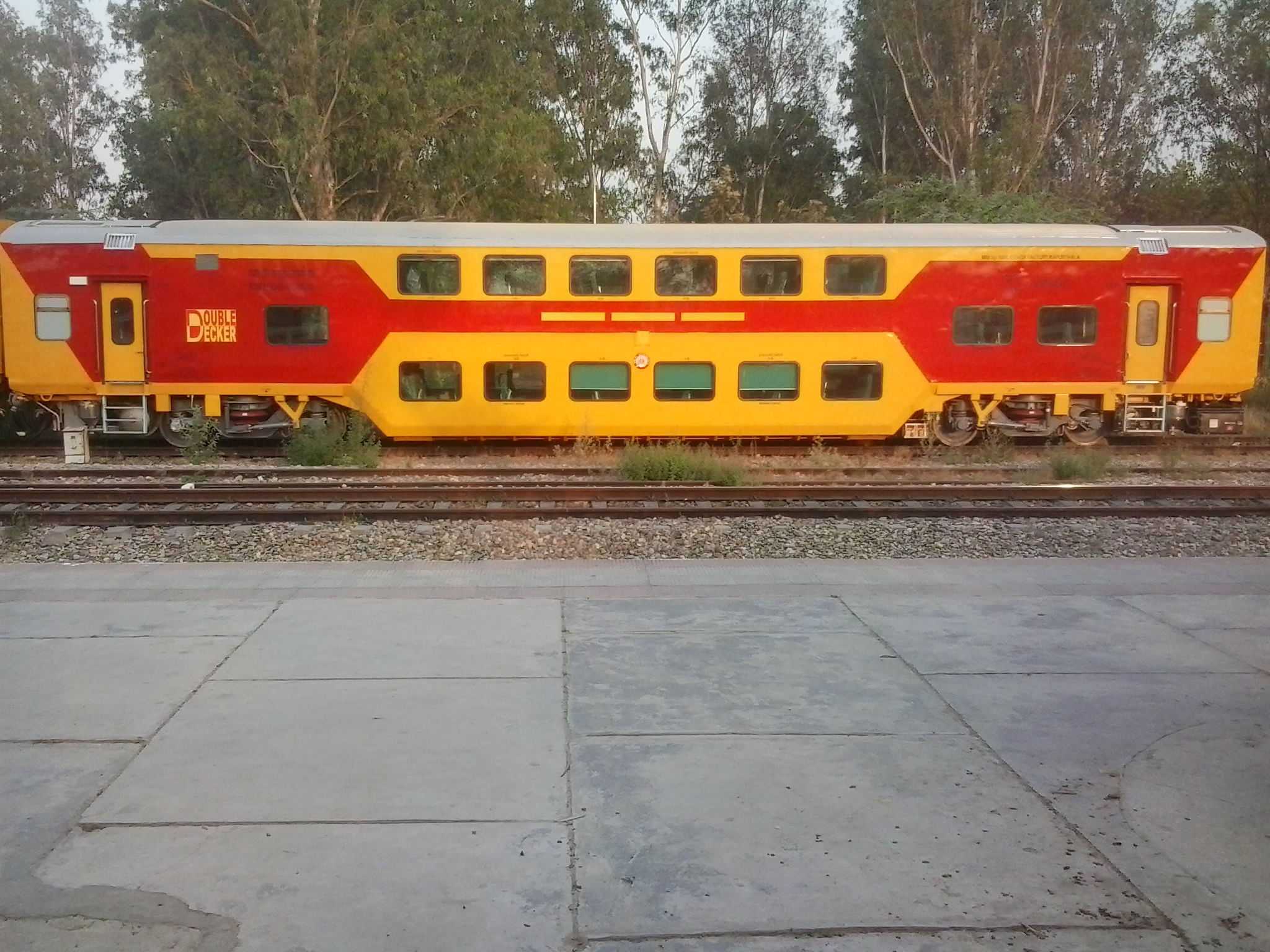
Air-conditioned double-decker coach

It consisted of 11 AC coaches. All the classes were GPS-enabled and provided information such as current train speed, distance to final destination, distance to next stop, stoppage station name and timing performance on an LCD. The train started its services in September 2013.

== See also ==
- indiarailinfo.com
- indiarailinfo.com
