= LMS diesel shunter 1831 =

Railway locomotive

LMS 1831
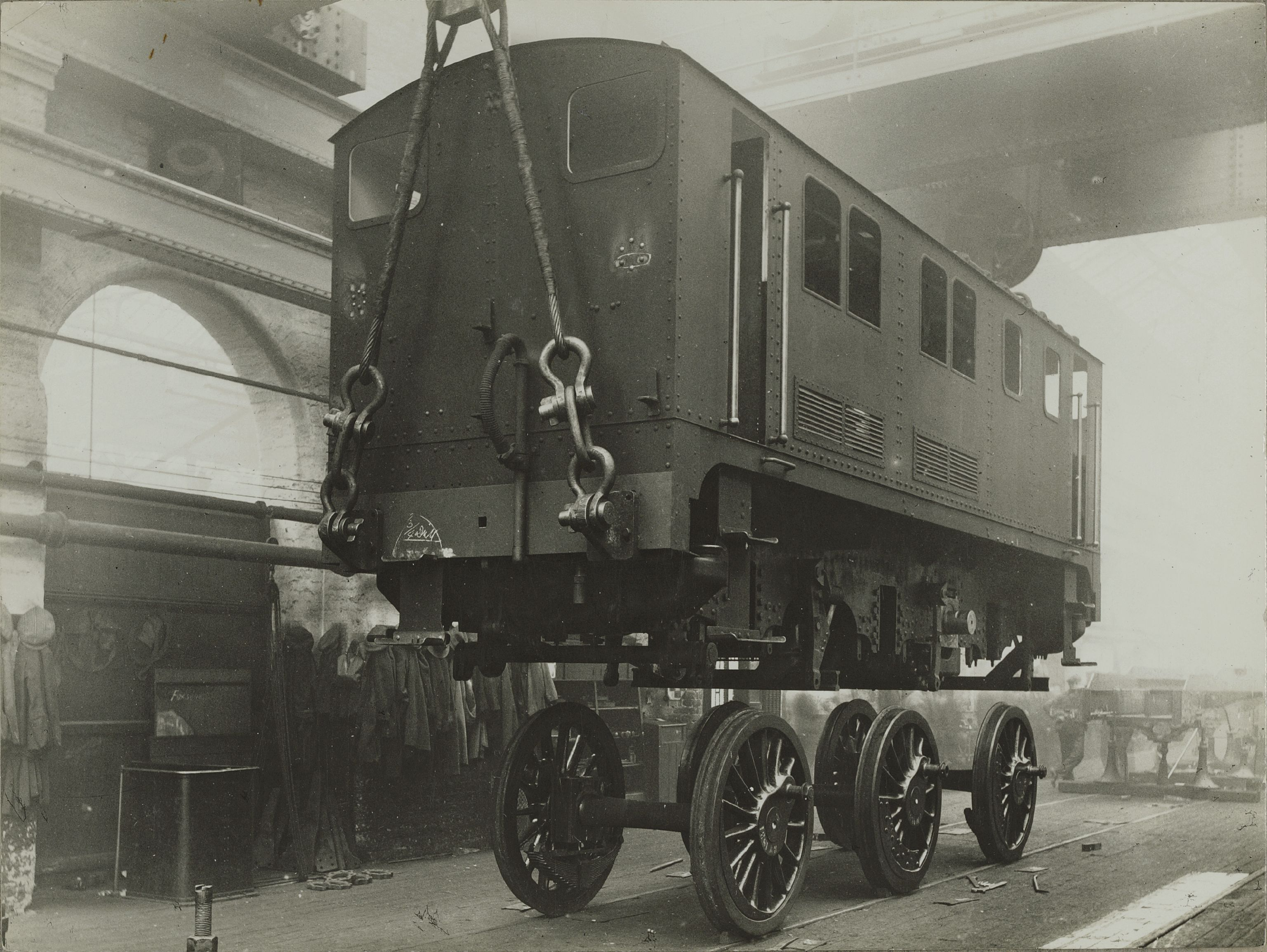
Type and origin
- Power type: Diesel Hydraulic
- Builder: LMS, Derby Works
- Build date: 1931
- Total produced: 1
Specifications
- Configuration
  - Whyte: 0-6-0DH
- Gauge: 4 ft 8 1/2 in (1,435 mm) standard gauge
- Wheel diameter: 4 ft 7 in (1.397 m)
- Wheelbase: 15 ft 8 in (4.78 m)
- Length: 30 ft 3 3/4 in (9.24 m)
- Width: 8 ft 7 1/2 in (2.63 m)
- Height: 12 ft 9 in (3.89 m)
- Loco weight: 45 long tons 2 cwt (101,000 lb or 45.8 t)
- Fuel capacity: 140 imperial gallons (640 L; 170 US gal)
- Prime mover: Davey Paxman
- Engine type: 6-cyl
- Transmission: Haslam & Newton
- Loco brake: Air brake (independent)
- Train brakes: Vacuum brake
Performance figures
- Maximum speed: 25 mph (40 km/h)
- Power output: 400 hp (298 kW) at 750 rpm; later 300 hp (224 kW)
- Tractive effort: 22,400 lbf (99.6 kN); later 20,000 lbf (89.0 kN)
Career
- Operators: London, Midland and Scottish Railway
- Numbers: 1831
- Delivered: Testing: December 1932; In stock: May 1934
- Withdrawn: September 1939
- Disposition: Rebuilt 1940 in to mobile power unit; scrapped August 1951

LMS diesel shunter No. 1831 was a one-off experimental diesel hydraulic shunter built by the London, Midland and Scottish Railway (LMS) in 1931, which pioneered diesel shunting in the UK.

== Design ==
It was ordered in 1931 from the Midland Railway's Derby Works and delivered in December 1932, nominally a rebuild of a Midland Railway 1377 Class 0-6-0T steam locomotive of the same number, built in September 1892 by the Vulcan Foundry. The frames and running gear of the original locomotive were retained. It had a Davey Paxman 6-cylinder 400 hp (298 kW) at 750 rpm engine (later converted to 300 hp (224 kW) and a Haslam & Newton transmission.

== History ==
After initial testing, the locomotive entered stock in May 1934, but was not successful in ordinary service. The locomotive was put into storage in 1936 and officially withdrawn from service in September 1939. It was converted to a mobile power unit, emerging in its new guise as MPU3 in November 1940. It was scrapped in August 1951.
