= Jaipur–Delhi Sarai Rohilla AC Double Decker Express =

Train in India

Jaipur Junction – Delhi Sarai Rohilla AC Double Decker Express
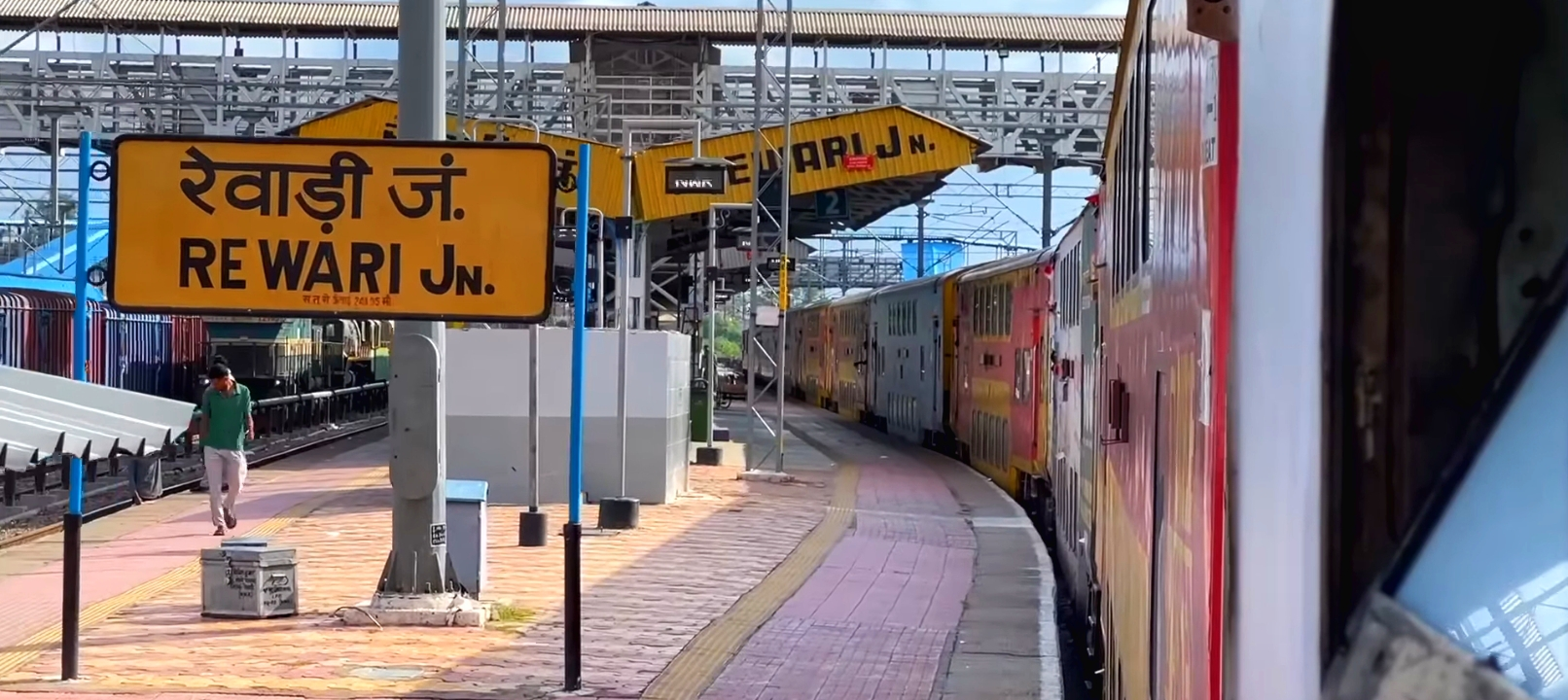
- Jaipur–Delhi Sarai Rohilla AC Double Decker Express Arrived At Rewari Junction

Overview
- Service type: Double Decker Express
- Status: Active
- Locale: Rajasthan, Haryana & Delhi
- First service: 24 August 2012; 13 years ago
- Current operator: North Western Railways

Route
- Termini: Jaipur Junction (JPR); Delhi Sarai Rohilla (DEE)
- Stops: 7
- Distance travelled: 303 km (188 mi)
- Average journey time: 4 hours 25 minutes
- Service frequency: Daily
- Train number: 12985 / 12986

On-board services
- Classes: AC Chair Car; Executive chair car coach
- Seating arrangements: Yes
- Sleeping arrangements: No
- Catering facilities: On-board Catering; E-Catering
- Observation facilities: large windows

Technical
- Rolling stock: LHB Double Decker
- Track gauge: 1,676 mm (5 ft 6 in)
- Electrification: 25 kV 50 Hz AC Overhead line
- Operating speed: 160 km/h (99 mph) maximum, 98.33 km/h (61 mph) average including halts

The 12985 / 12986 Jaipur–Delhi Sarai Rohilla AC Double Decker Express is a Superfast Express train belonging to Indian Railways – North Western Railway zone that runs between Jaipur Junction of Rajasthan and Delhi Sarai Rohilla of New Delhi in India.

It operates as train number 12985 from Jaipur Junction to Delhi Sarai Rohilla and as train number 12986 in the reverse direction, serving the states of Rajasthan, Haryana and New Delhi.

== Coaches ==
The 12985/86 Jaipur–Delhi Sarai Rohilla AC Double Decker Express presently has 1 Executive Class and 13 AC Chair Car Coaches in addition to 2 EOG coaches.

As with most train services in India, coach composition may be amended at the discretion of Indian Railways depending on demand.

	1	2	3	4	5	6	7	8	9	10	11	12	13	14	15	16	17
12985		EOG	E1	C1	C2	C3	C4	C5	C6	C7	C8	C9	C10	C11	C12	C13	EOG
	1	2	3	4	5	6	7	8	9	10	11	12	13	14	15	16	17
12986		EOG	C13	C12	C11	C10	C9	C8	C7	C6	C5	C4	C3	C2	C1	E1	EOG

== Service ==
The 12985/86 Jaipur–Delhi Sarai Rohilla AC Double Decker Express covers the distance of 303 kilometers in 4 hours 25 mins (67.33 km/h) in both directions.

As the average speed of the train is above 98 km/h, as per Indian Railways rules, its fare includes a Superfast surcharge.

== Routeing ==
The 12985/12986 Jaipur –Delhi Sarai Rohilla Double Decker Express runs from Jaipur via, Gandhinagar-Jaipur, Dausa, Alwar, Gurgaon, Delhi Cantt to Delhi Sarai Rohilla and vice versa.

== Traction ==
Earlier they run with diesel locomotives like WDM-3A and WDP-4 or WDM-3D. A Tughlakabad(DLS) based WAP 7 locomotive hauls the train for the entire route.

== Time table ==
12985 Jaipur–Delhi Sarai Rohilla AC Double Decker Express leaves Alwar Junction on a daily basis and reaches Delhi Sarai Rohilla the same day. Leaving at 06:00 AM from Jaipur, it reaches Sarai Rohilla at 10:25 AM, after journey period of four and a half hours.

12986 Delhi Sarai Rohilla–Jaipur AC Double Decker Express leaves Delhi Sarai Rohilla on a daily basis and reaches Jaipur Junction the same day. Starts at 05:35 PM from Sarai and reaches Jaipur at 10.00 PM, after journey period of four and a half hours.

The schedule of this 12985/12986 Jaipur - Delhi Sarai Rohilla AC Double Decker Express is given below:-

AWR - DEE - AWR AC Double Decker Express
12985		Stations	12986	
Arrival	Departure	Stations	Arrival	Departure
-NIL-	07:43	Jaipur Junction	19:51	-NIL-
09:36	09:38	Gurgaon	18:08	18:10
09:53	09:55	Delhi Cantt.	17:50	17:52
10:25	-NIL-	Delhi Sarai Rohilla	-NIL-	17:35
