= Kacheguda–Tirupati Double Decker Express =

Kacheguda–Tirupati AC Double Decker Express
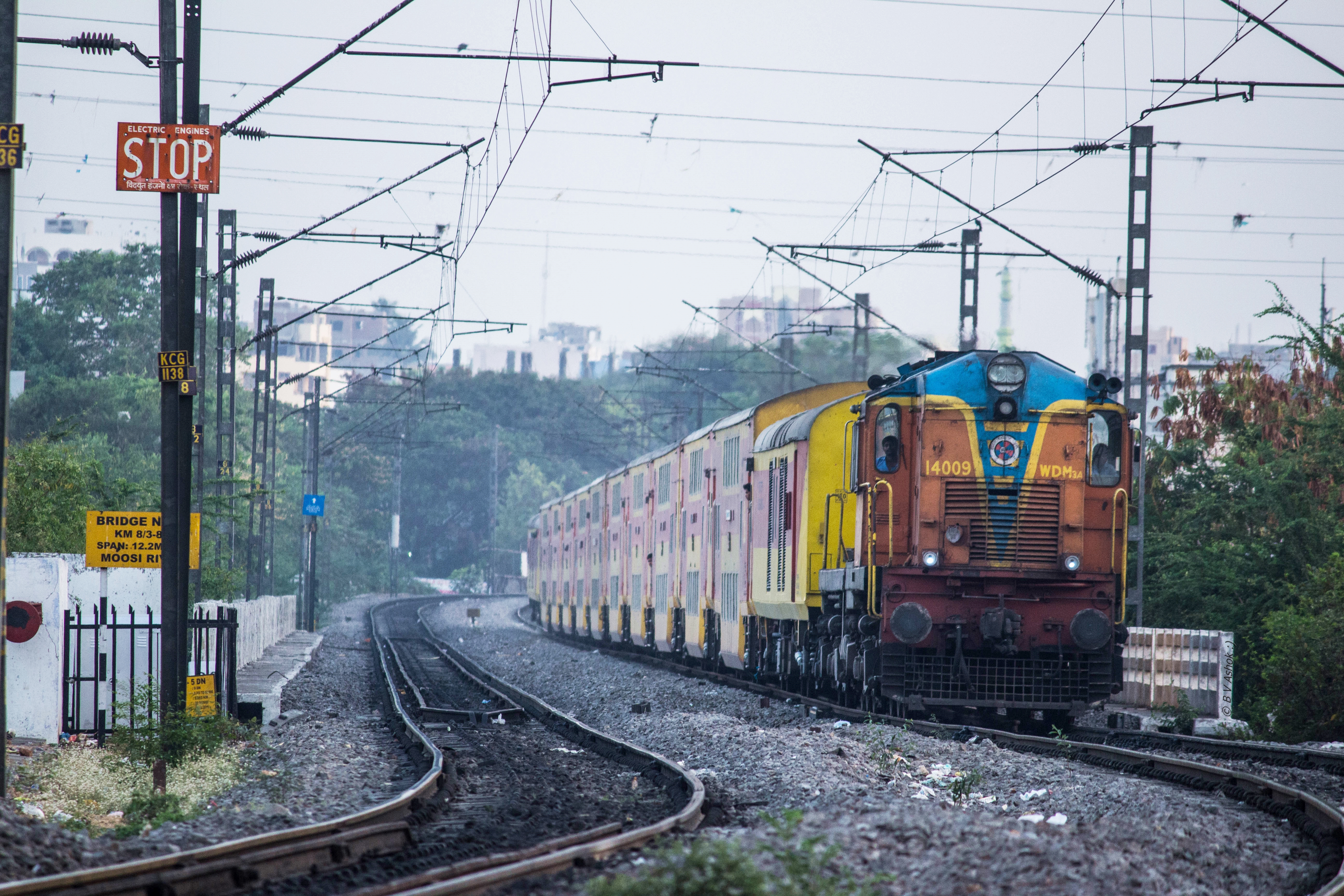
- Tirupathi - Kacheguda Double Decker Superfast Express

Overview
- Service type: Double Decker Express
- Status: Cancelled
- Locale: Telangana and Andhra Pradesh
- First service: 15 May 2014; 12 years ago
- Last service: 14 November 2016; 9 years ago
- Current operator: South Central Railway zone

Route
- Termini: Kacheguda (KCG); Tirupati Main (TPTY)
- Stops: 10
- Distance travelled: 636 km
- Average journey time: 11 hrs 30 m
- Service frequency: Weekly twice (Wed, Sat)
- Train number: 22119 / 22120

On-board services
- Class: AC CC 10
- Seating arrangements: Available
- Catering facilities: Available
- Observation facilities: Large windows
- Baggage facilities: Available

Technical
- Track gauge: Broad gauge
- Operating speed: 55 km/h

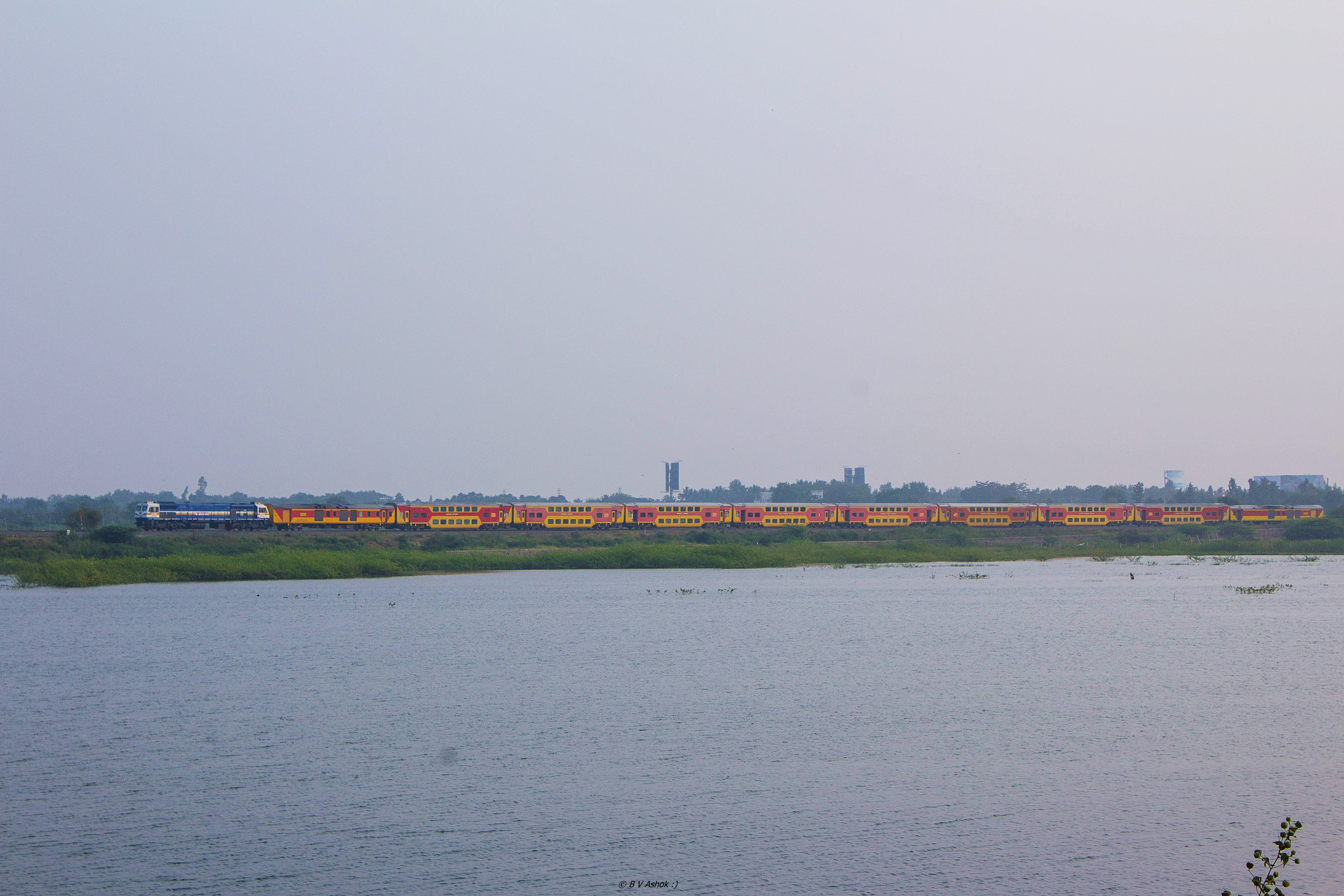
The last run of Kacheguda–Tirupati Double Decker Express on 13 Nov 2016 as seen near Lake Kamuni

The Kacheguda–Tirupati AC Double Decker Express was a Superfast Express connecting Hyderabad and Tirupati cities. It was one of the first AC Double Decker Express in the states of Telangana and Andhra Pradesh alongside Guntur–Kacheguda AC Double Decker Express. It had CZDAC coaches (AC chair-car) and VESDA (Very Early Smoke Detection with Alarm system), first of its kind, in a double-decker train.
