= Guntur–Kacheguda AC Double Decker Express =

Indian express train

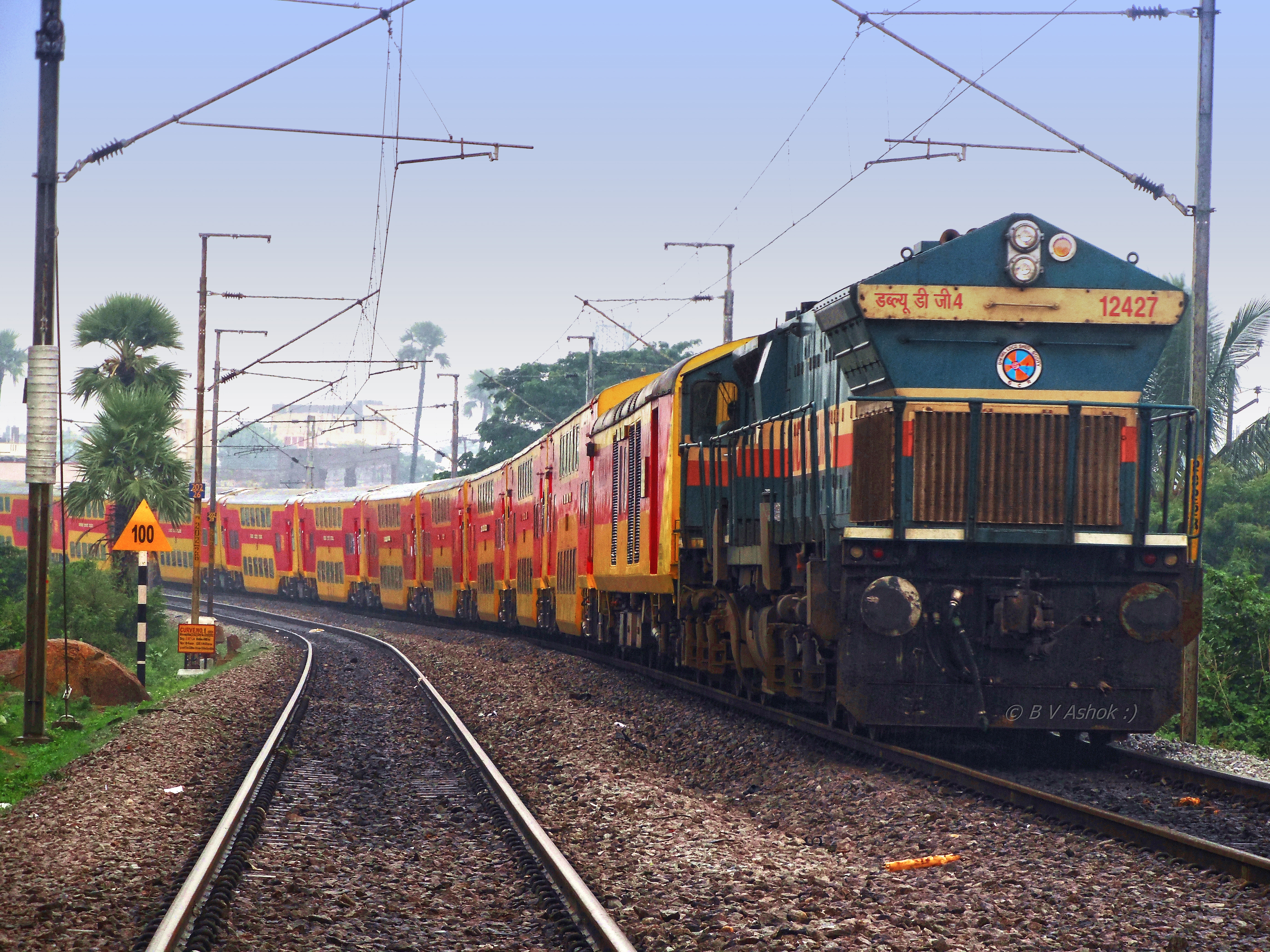

Overview
- Service type: Double Decker
- Status: Cancelled
- Locale: Telangana and Andhra Pradesh
- First service: 13 May 2014; 12 years ago
- Last service: 14 November 2016; 9 years ago
- Current operator: South Central Railway zone

Route
- Termini: Guntur Junction (GNT); Kacheguda (KCG)
- Stops: 4
- Distance travelled: 287 km (178 mi)
- Average journey time: 5h 10m
- Service frequency: Bi-weekly (Note: Runs two days in a week for every direction.)
- Train number: 22117/22118

On-board services
- Class: AC Chair Car (Double Decker)
- Seating arrangements: Yes
- Sleeping arrangements: No
- Catering facilities: E-catering
- Observation facilities: LHB coach
- Entertainment facilities: No
- Baggage facilities: No
- Other facilities: Below the seats

Technical
- Rolling stock: 2
- Track gauge: 1,676 mm (5 ft 6 in)
- Operating speed: 56 km/h (35 mph), including halts

The Guntur–Kacheguda AC Double Decker Express was a Superfast Double Decker train belonging to South Central Railway zone that used to run between Guntur Junction and Kacheguda in India. It was operated with 22117/22118 train numbers on bi-weekly basis.

== Service ==
The 22117/Guntur–Kacheguda AC Double Decker Express has an average speed of 56 km/h and covers 287 km in 5h 10m. The 22118/Kacheguda–Guntur AC Double Decker Express has an average speed of 57 km/h and covers 287 km in 5h 5m.

== Route and halts ==
The important halts of the train are:

- Guntur Junction
- Piduguralla
- Miryalaguda
- Nalgonda
- Malkajgiri Junction
- Kacheguda

== Coach composition ==
The train has standard LHB rakes with max speed of 130 kmph. The train consists of 10 coaches:

- 8 AC Chair Car (Double Decker)
- 2 End-on Generator

== Traction ==
Both trains are hauled by a Gooty Loco Shed-based WDM-3A diesel locomotive from Guntur to Hyderabad and vice versa.

== Direction reversal ==
The train shares its rake with 22119/22120 Kacheguda–Tirupati Double Decker Express.

== See also ==
- Guntur Junction railway station
- Kacheguda railway station
- Kacheguda–Tirupati Double Decker Express
