= Rani Kamalapati–Indore Junction AC Double Decker Express =

Passenger train in India

Rani Kamalapati – Indore Junction AC Double Decker Express
Overview
- Service type: Express
- First service: 27 September 2013; 12 years ago
- Last service: originally 13 August 2014 now extended
- Current operator: West Central Railways
- Ridership: Poor

Route
- Termini: Rani Kamalapati; Indore Junction
- Stops: 6
- Distance travelled: 224 km (139 mi)
- Average journey time: 3 hours 35 minutes as 22183 Rani Kamalapati Indore Junction AC Double Decker Express, 4 hours 00 minutes as 22184 Indore Junction Rani Kamalapati AC Double Decker Express
- Service frequency: Daily
- Train number: 22183 / 22184

On-board services
- Class: AC Chair Car
- Seating arrangements: Yes
- Sleeping arrangements: No
- Catering facilities: No pantry car attached
- Observation facilities: Rake sharing with 22185 / 86 Bhopal–Indore AC Double Decker Express

Technical
- Rolling stock: Standard Indian Railways coaches
- Track gauge: 1,676 mm (5 ft 6 in)
- Operating speed: 140 km/h (87 mph) maximum, 59.08 km/h (37 mph), including halts

The 22183 / 84 Rani Kamalapati–Indore Junction AC Double Decker Express is an express train belonging to Indian Railways – West Central Railway zone that runs between Rani Kamalapati and Indore Junction in India.

It operates as train number 22183 from Rani Kamalapati to Indore Junction and as train number 22184 in the reverse direction, serving the state of Madhya Pradesh.

== Coaches ==
The 22183 / 84 Rani Kamalapati–Indore Junction AC Double Decker Express on introduction had 11 AC Chair Car coaches but owing to poor response presently has only 3 AC Chair Car coaches. It does not have a pantry car.

As is customary with most train services in India, coach composition may be amended at the discretion of Indian Railways depending on demand.

== Service ==
22183 Rani Kamalapati–Indore Junction AC Double Decker Express covers the distance of 224 kilometres in 3 hours 35 mins (62.51 km/h) and in 4 hours 00 mins as 22184 Indore Junction–Rani Kamalapati AC Double Decker Express (56.00 km/h).

As the average speed of the train is above 55 km/h, as per Indian Railways rules, its fare includes a Superfast surcharge.

== Routeing ==
The 22183 / 84 Rani Kamalapati–Indore Junction AC Double Decker Express runs from Rani Kamalapati via Bairgarh, Maksi, Dewas Junction to Indore Junction.

== Traction ==
As the route is fully electrified, it is powered by a Tuglakabad-based WAP-7 for its entire run .

== Timings ==
- 22183 Rani Kamalapati–Indore Junction AC Double Decker Express leaves Rani Kamalapati on a daily basis at 06:00 hrs IST and reaches Indore Junction at 09:35 hrs IST the same day.
- 22184 Indore Junction–Rani Kamalapati AC Double Decker Express leaves Indore Junction on a daily basis at 19:20 hrs IST and reaches Rani Kamalapati at 23:20 hrs IST the same day.
