= Research Design and Standards Organisation =

Indian Railways organisation

Research Design & Standards Organisation
- Type: Organization
- Industry: Research and development
- Founded: 1957; 69 years ago
- Headquarters: Lucknow, Uttar Pradesh, India
- Area served: India
- Owner: Government of India
- Parent: Ministry of Railways through Railway Board (India)
- Website: rdso.indianrailways.gov.in

The Research Designs & Standards Organisation (RDSO) is the research and development and railway technical specification development organisation under the Ministry of Railways of the Government of India, which functions as a technical adviser and consultant to the Railway Board, the Zonal Railways, the Railway Production Units, RITES, RailTel and Ircon International with respect to the design and standardization of railway equipment and problems related to railway construction, operations and maintenance.

== History ==
To enforce standardization and coordination between various railway systems in British India, the Indian Railway Conference Association (IRCA) was set up in 1902. It was followed by the establishment of the Central Standards Office (CSO) in 1930, for the preparation of designs, standards, and specifications. However, before India's independence in 1947, most design and manufacture of railway equipment was entrusted to foreign consultants. After independence, the Railway Testing and Research Centre (RTRC) was set up in 1952 at Lucknow, for undertaking the intensive investigation of railway problems, providing basic criteria and new concepts for design purposes, testing prototypes, and generally assisting in finding solutions for specific problems.

In 1957, the Central Standards Office (CSO) and the Railway Testing and Research Centre (RTRC) were integrated into a single unit named Research Designs and Standards Organisation (RDSO) under the Ministry of Railways with its headquarters at Manak Nagar, Lucknow. The status of RDSO was changed from an "attached office" to a "zonal railway" on 1 January 2003, to give it greater flexibility and a boost to the research and development activities.

== Organisation ==
RDSO is headed by the director general, who is equivalent to the general manager of a zonal railway. The present director general is . The director general is assisted by an additional director general and 23 senior executive directors and executive directors, who are in charge of the 27 directorates: Bridges and Structures, Carriage, Geotechnical Engineering, Testing, Track Design, Medical, EMU & Power Supply, Engine Development, Finance & Accounts, Telecommunication, Quality Assurance, Personnel, Works, Psycho-Technical, Research, Signal, Wagon Design, Electric Locomotive, Stores, Track Machines & Monitoring, Traction Installation, Energy Management, Traffic, Metallurgical & Chemical, Motive Power and Library & Publications. All the directorates except Defence Research are located in Lucknow.

== Projects ==
- Trial run of the world's first double-decker cargo liner train, which can haul passengers as well as cargo at 180kmph
- Trial run of world's first triple-stack container train
- Design and specification of 12,000 hp WAG-11 electric locomotive
- Design and specification of Vande Bharat
- Design and development of dual purpose Double Decker Express for cargo as well as passenger
- Design and specification of WDAP-5
- Design and specification of Utkrisht Double Decker
- Development of design & specification of WAG-12
- Development of Double Decker Express
- Design of WAGC3 locomotive
- Development of a new crashworthy design of 4500 HP WDG4 locomotive incorporating new technology to improve dynamic braking and attain significant fuel savings
- Development of Drivers' Vigilance Telemetric Control System, which directly measures and analyses variations in biometric parameters to determine the state of alertness of the driver
- Development of Kavach
- Development of computer-aided drivers' aptitude test equipment for screening high-speed train drivers for Rajdhani/Shatabdi Express trains to evaluate their reaction time, form perception, vigilance, and speed anticipation
- Assessment of residual fatigue life of critical railway components like rail, rail weld, wheels, cylinder head, OHE mast, catenary wire, contact wire, wagon components, low components, to formulate remedial actions
- Modification of the specification of the electric lifting barrier to improve its strength and reliability
- Design and development of modern fault-tolerant, fail-safe, maintainer-friendly electronic interlocking system
- Development of a 4500 HP Hotel Load Locomotive to provide a clean and noise-free power supply to coaches from the locomotive to eliminate the existing generator car of Garib Rath express trains
- Field trials for electric locomotive hauling Rajdhani/Shatabdi express trains with the Head On Generation (HOG) system to provide a clean and noise-free power supply to the end coaches
- Development of WiMAX technology to provide internet access to the passengers in running trains
- Design and development of ballastless track with the indigenous fastening system (BLT-IFS)
- Design and development of rail free fastening (RFF) for girder bridges
- Reduction in de-stressing temperature in LWR with the use of wider and heavier sleepers
- Carrying long welded rails through points and crossings
- Laying of long welded rails in a sharp curve of less than 440 m radius
- Design and development of 25T axle load bogie for different wagons

== Major achievements ==
- Design and development of a high-toe-load fastening system, ERC mark-V
- Development of pre-stressed concrete sleeper and allied components along with source development
- Development of newly designed double decker coaches in Indian Railways
- Development of improved AT welding technology with the single shot crucible, auto-thimble, and 3-piece mould
- Design and development of the first emission test car (ETC) to test diesel locomotive emissions
- Design and development of a wider and heavier sleeper fit for a 25-tonne axle load
- Development of a protocol for laying long welded rails through points and crossing using welded CMS frogs
- Development of Head on Generation (HOG), which taps overhead supply lines and distributes power to the train coaches, an alternative to End on Generation (EOG)

== See also ==
- Automotive Industry Standards
- TSDSI
