= Vulcan Foundry =

British locomotive manufacturer (1833–1970)

Coordinates: 53.4417°N 2.6257°W

The Vulcan Foundry Ltd
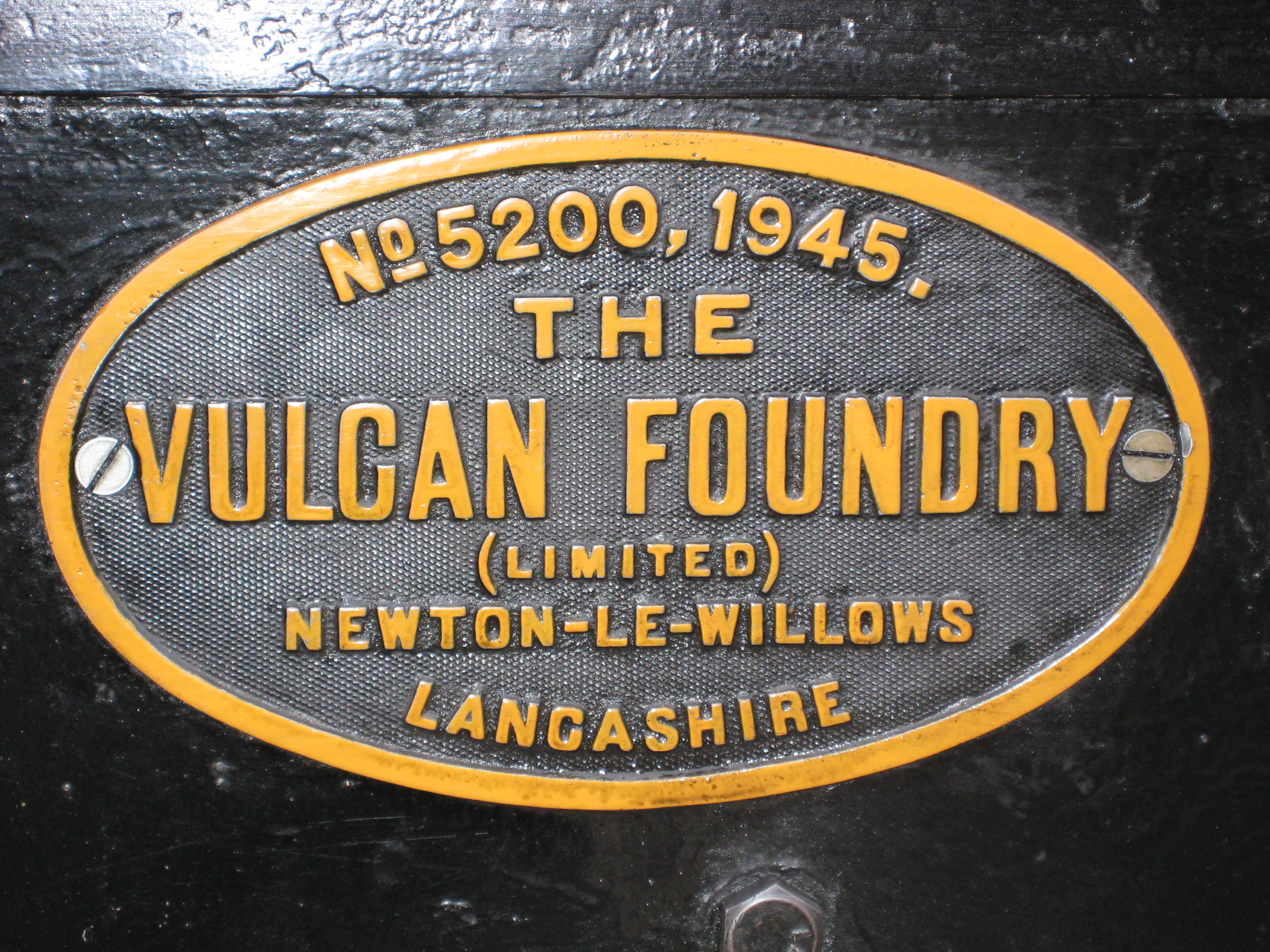
- Vulcan Foundry worksplate
- Type: Limited company
- Industry: Engineering
- Predecessor: Charles Tayleur and Company
- Founded: 1832
- Defunct: 1970
- Fate: Acquired
- Successor: English Electric
- Headquarters: Newton-le-Willows, Merseyside, England
- Products: Railway locomotives and engines

The Vulcan Foundry Limited was an English locomotive builder sited at Newton-le-Willows, in Lancashire (now Merseyside), England. The locomotive works were active between 1832 and 1970, (Note: Operating as part of English Electric from 1955.) building locomotives for railways around the world.

== History ==
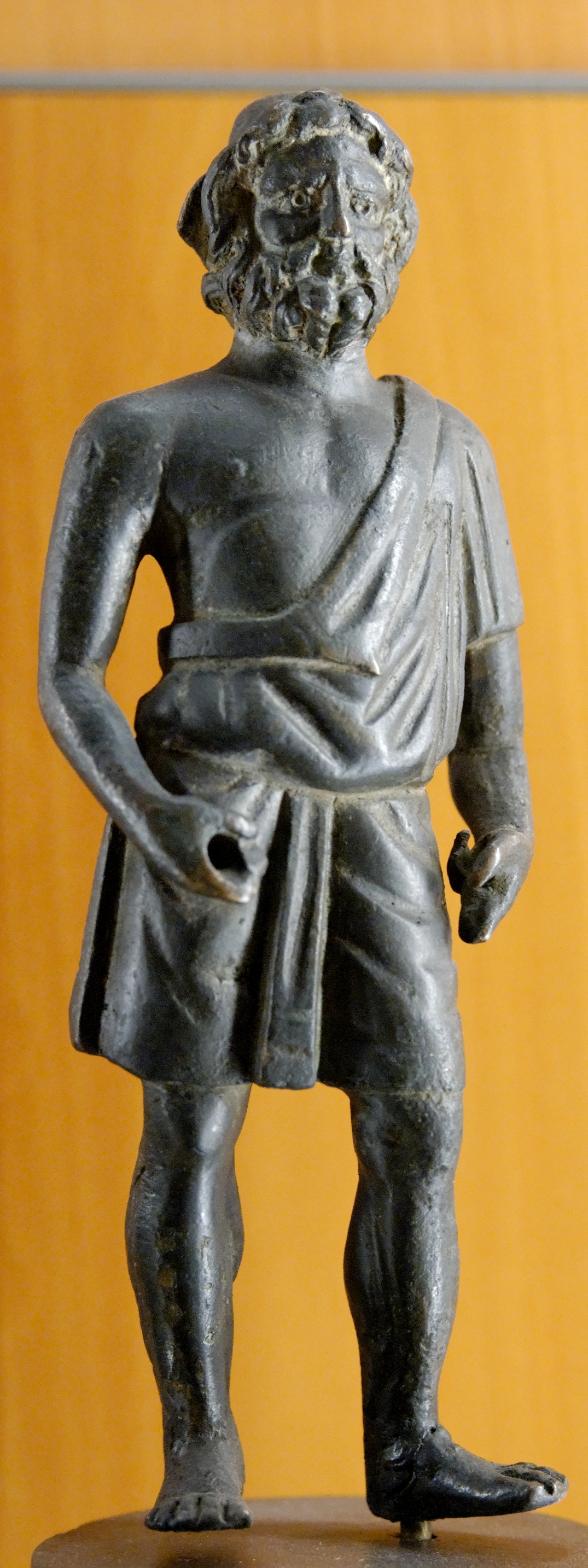
Vulcan; the Roman god of fire, metalworking and the forge

The Vulcan Foundry opened in 1832, as Charles Tayleur and Company to produce girders for bridges, switches, crossings and other ironwork, following the opening of the Liverpool and Manchester Railway. Due to the distance from the locomotive works in Newcastle-upon-Tyne, it was preferable to build and support them locally. In 1832, Robert Stephenson became a partner for a few years. The company had become The Vulcan Foundry Company in 1847 and acquired limited liability in 1864. From the beginning of 1898, the name changed again to The Vulcan Foundry Limited, dropping the word 'company'.

=== Vulcan Halt ===
The site had its own railway station, Vulcan Halt}, on the former Warrington and Newton Railway line from Earlestown to Warrington Bank Quay. The wooden-platformed halt was opened on 1 November 1916 by the London and North Western Railway and closed on 12 June 1965.

== Steam locomotives ==
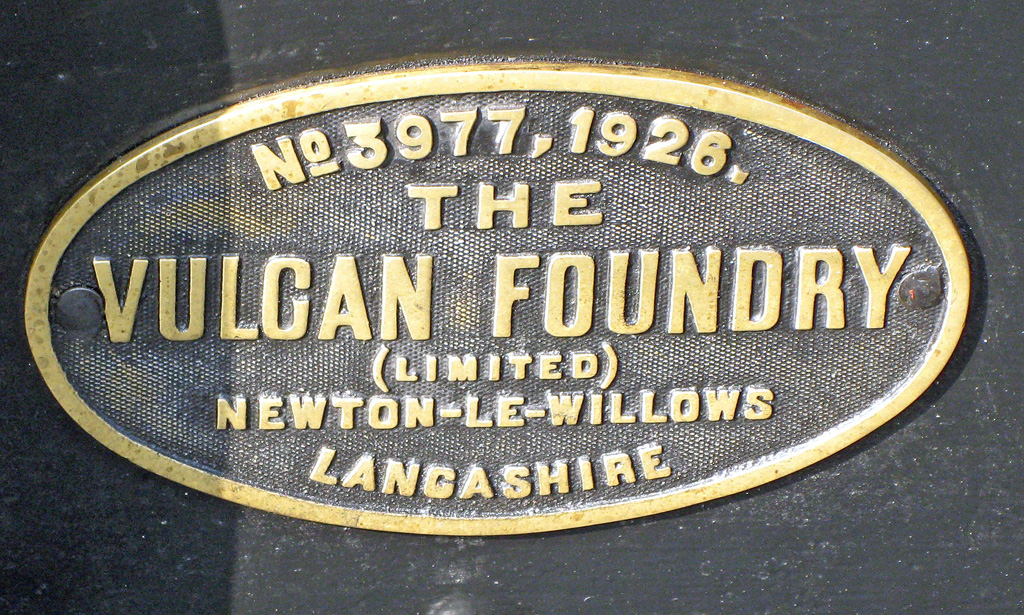
Vulcan Foundry works plate No. 3977 of 1926 on LMS Fowler Class 3F no. 47406 in 2012

Details of the earliest locomotives are not known precisely, despite an "official" list apparently concocted in the 1890s which contains a lot of guesswork and invention, with many quite fictitious locomotives, for the period before 1845. This list claims that the first two locomotives were 0-4-0 Tayleur and Stephenson built in 1833 for "Mr Hargreaves, Bolton", but this seems unlikely. The earliest authenticated products were 0-4-0 Titan and Orion, similar to Stephenson's design, and delivered in September and October 1834 to the Liverpool & Manchester Railway. Other early orders came from the Leicester and Swannington Railway and some 4-2-0s for the US, which were among the first British 'bogie' locomotives.

From 1835, the company was selling to Belgium, France, Austria and Russia; the beginnings of an export trade which was maintained throughout the life of the company. The company's locomotives had a strong Stephenson influence, many during the following decade being of the "long boiler" design. In 1852, the first locomotives ever to run in India were supplied to the Great Indian Peninsula Railway.

A number of Fairlie locomotives were built, including Taliesin for the Ffestiniog Railway, Mountaineer for the Denver & Rio Grande Railway and Josephine one of the NZR E class (1872). During 1870, the company supplied the first locomotive to run in Japan, and a flangeless 0-4-0T for a steelworks in Tredegar which was still using angle rails. A number of Matthew Kirtley's double-framed goods engines were also produced for the Midland Railway. In c.1911, following a 1910 report by the Locomotive Committee on standard locomotives for Indian Railways, North-Western Railway, (Note: This was a regional railway, operated at that time by the Indian State Railway.) ordered 11 broad-gauge locomotives; (Note: Measuring 5 feet 6 inches between the rails.) it was favoured because it allowed the engineers designing the locomotives to build larger fireboxes and boilers, enabling the engines to pull longer and heavier loads.

The healthy export trade continued, particularly to India and South America, and continued after World War I.

Following the formation of the London, Midland and Scottish Railway in 1923, some very large orders were received, including over a hundred LMS Fowler Class 3F 0-6-0T engines and 75 LMS Compound 4-4-0 locomotives.

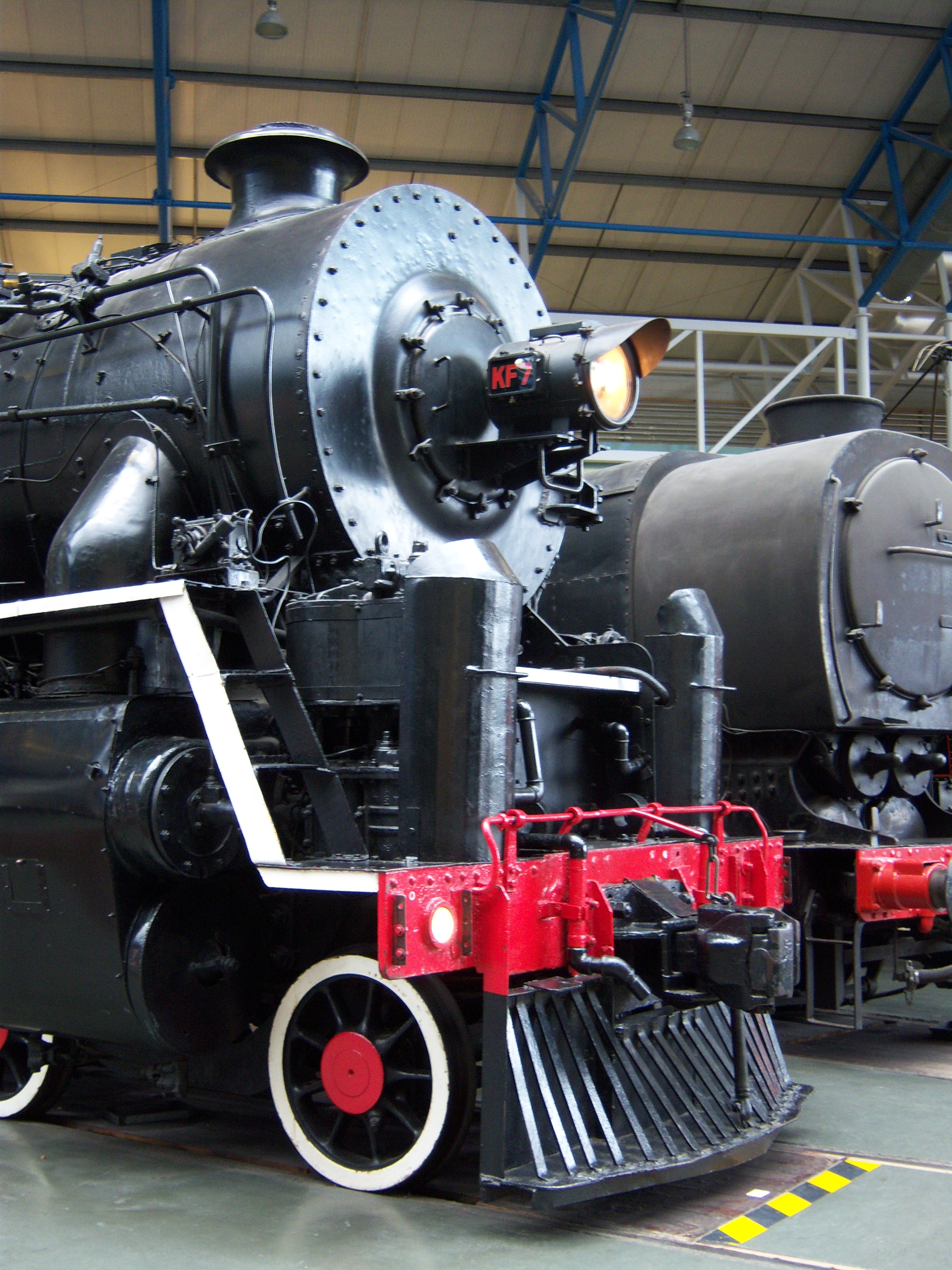
A Chinese Railways KF7, built by Vulcan, in the National Railway Museum in York

The most notable design manufactured for an overseas railway during this period was the large 4-8-4 built for the Chinese National Railways in 1934–35. These locomotives were equipped with a mechanical stoker and six of them were fitted with booster engines on the tender, providing an extra 7,670 lb (3,480 kg) tractive effort. Of the 24 exported, one returned to the UK and is preserved at the National Railway Museum in York.

Throughout the 1930s, the company survived the trade recessions with the aid of more orders from India, some from Tanganyika and Argentina, and a large order in 1934 from the LMS for 4-6-0 "Black Fives" and 2-8-0 Stanier-designed locomotives.

During 1953-54, the company built 60 J class 2-8-0 locomotives for the Victorian Railways in Australia.

== Second World War ==
From 1939, the works was mostly concerned with the war effort, becoming involved in the development and production of the Matilda II tank. From 1943, large orders were received from the Ministry of Supply for locomotives, including 390 Austerity 2-8-0s and 50 Austerity 0-6-0 saddle tanks.

In 1944, the Vulcan Foundry acquired Robert Stephenson and Hawthorns and received an order for 120 "Liberation" 2-8-0 locomotives for the United Nations Relief and Rehabilitation Administration in Europe in 1945.

The war had left India's railways in a parlous state and, with foreign aid in 1947, embarked on a massive rebuilding plan. The Vulcan Foundry benefited from orders for XE, XD and YD 2-8-2s; ten WG 2-8-2s sub-contracted from the North British Locomotive Company, but the writing was on the wall for all British manufacturers. Not only was the competition fierce from other countries, but India had developed the ability to build its own locomotives.

== Diesel and electric locomotives ==
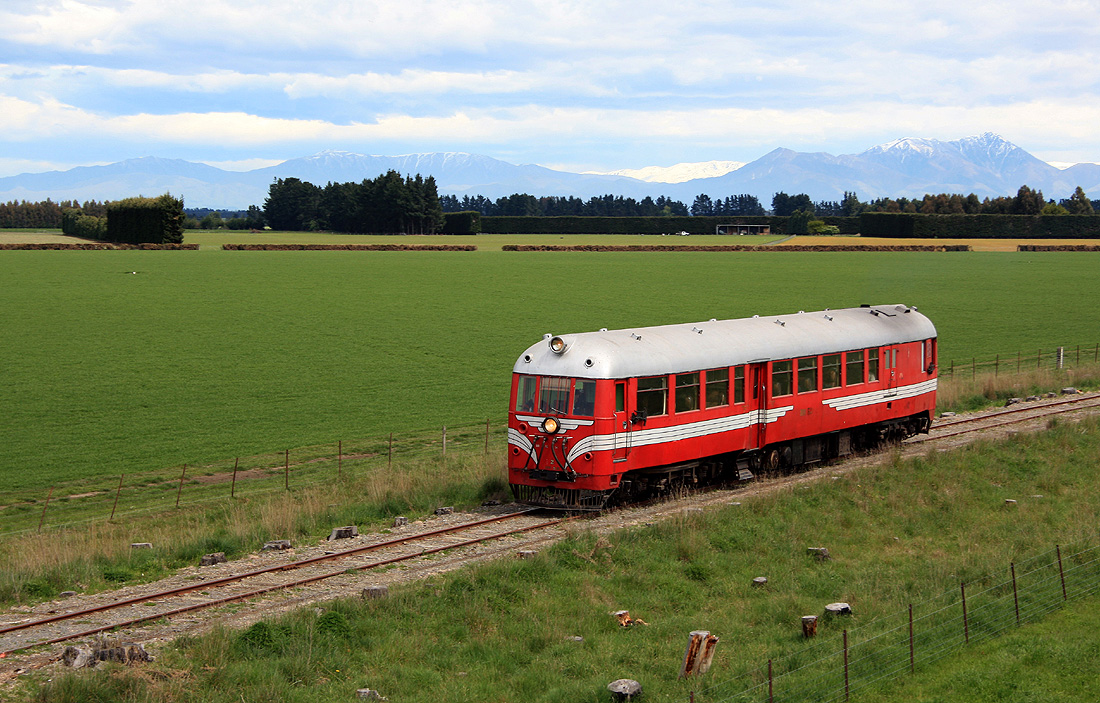
Preserved Vulcan-Frichs railcar on Plains Vintage Railway, Ashburton, New Zealand

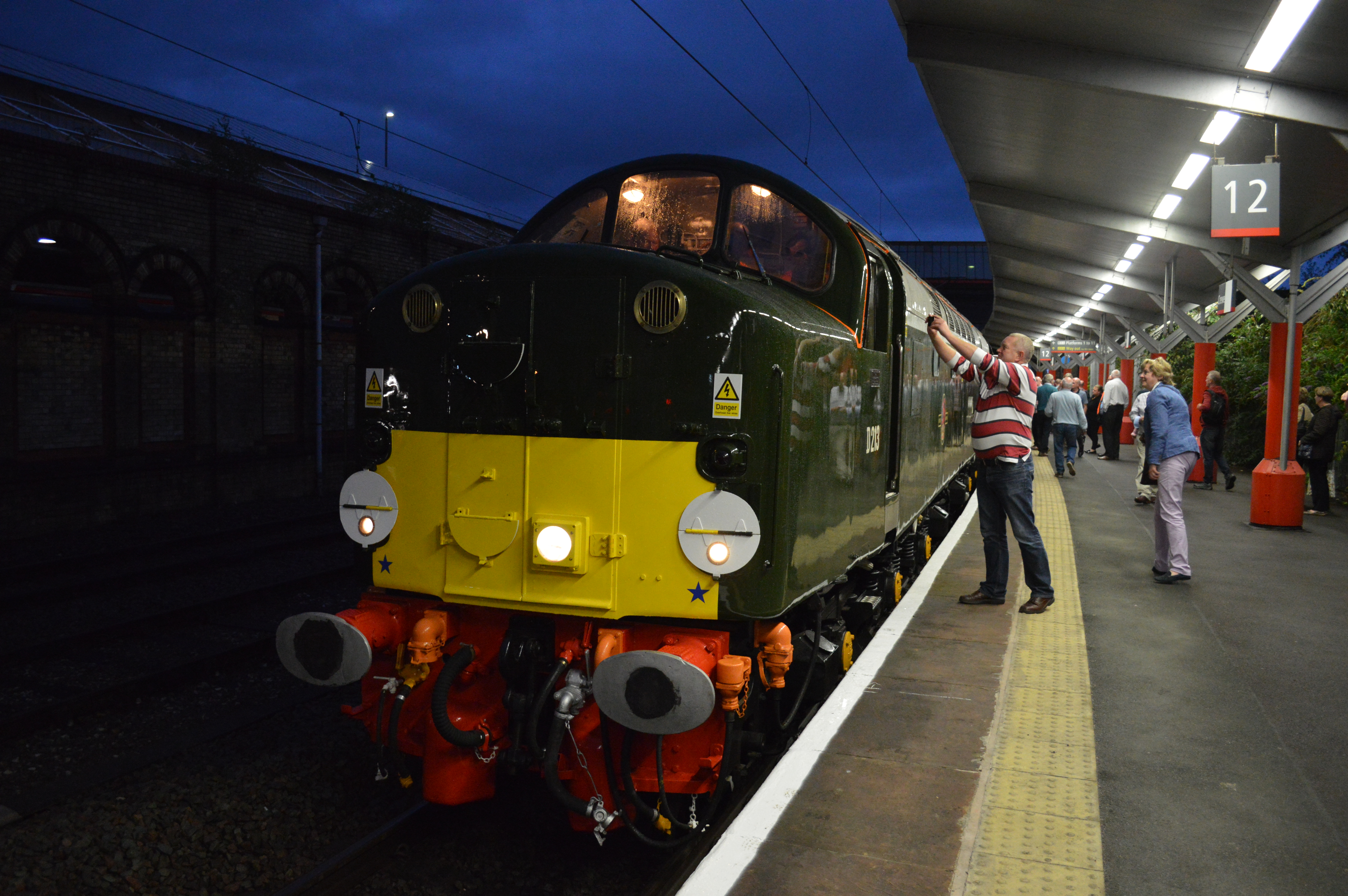
Class 40s were built at Vulcan Foundry and Robert Stephenson and Hawthorns, Darlington. D213 Andania stands at Crewe

The company built both diesel and electric locomotives. It built 31 "Crocodile" 2600hp 1,500V DC electric freight locomotives in 1929 for Great Indian Peninsular Railway; these were classified as EF/1, which became the WCG-1 class after Indian independence. India's National Rail Museum, New Delhi exhibits an WCG-1 locomotive from the Vulcan foundry. They also helped in supply of the WCM-1 and WCM-2 class.

In 1931, the company supplied the first experimental diesel shunter to the London, Midland and Scottish Railway. In 1936, Vulcan, a diesel-mechanical 0-6-0 shunter, with a Vulcan-Frichs six-cylinder 275hp (205kW) diesel engine, was loaned to the LMS; it was then used by the War Department, which numbered it 75 (later 70075). Following the end of World War II, it found industrial use in Yugoslavia.

In 1938, ten diesel railcars were ordered by New Zealand Railways, called the NZR RM class (Vulcan). They were supplied in 1940, although one was lost at sea to enemy action. In 1948, it supplied ten Class 15 diesel-electric shunters to Malayan Railways and twenty Class 20 diesel-electric locomotives for the same company nine years later.

The works has produced many locomotives for both domestic and foreign railways. It was a major supplier of diesel-electrics to British Railways; notably the Class 55 Deltic. The works also developed a prototype gas turbine locomotive, the British Rail GT3. Other classes of diesel locomotives to be built for British Railways at the Vulcan Foundry included Classes 20, 37, 40 and 50. Electric locomotives were also built for British Rail, including 60 Class 86s in 1965-66.

In the mid-1950s, negotiations began to sell the company. In 1955, the purchase was finalised and the business became part of the English Electric group.

The end of an era occurred in 1970, when continuous locomotive production came to an end; the last main line locomotive was supplied to Ghana Railways and Ports. Ruston Paxman Diesels Limited was formed as a management company within GEC and, in the spring of 1970, they had taken over the bulk of the Vulcan site. The works still produced diesel engines, which had been moved from Lincoln. Output was mainly for marine and stationary applications, but the company was the supplier of choice for British Rail Engineering Limited for locomotives built at Doncaster and Crewe.

== Sale and closure ==
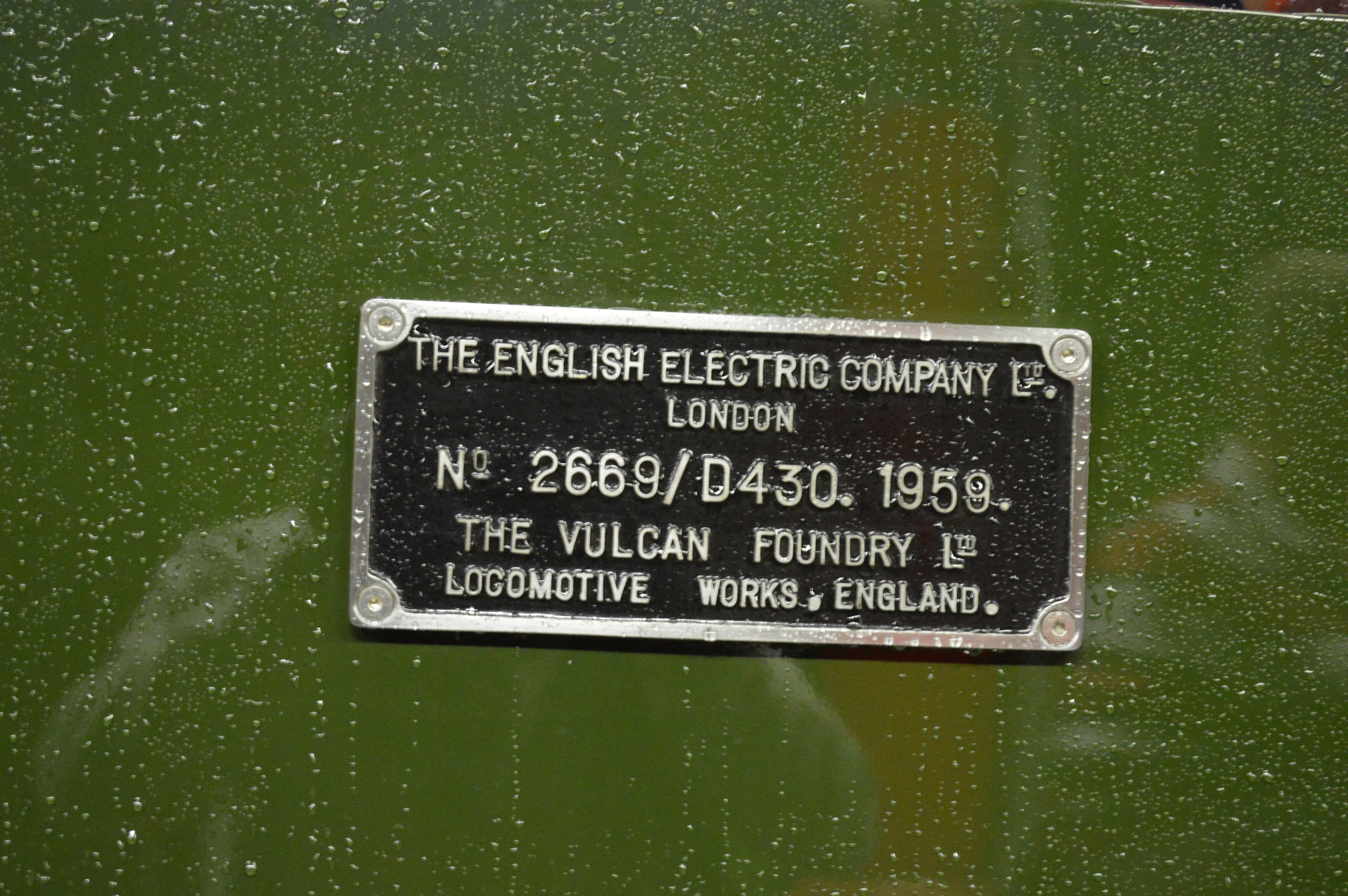
The worksplate of Class 40 no. D213 Andania, which was one of 180 members of the class to be built at the Vulcan Foundry

The factory then passed through various hands, as English Electric was bought by GEC, which in turn became GEC Alsthom (later renamed Alstom) and finally as part of MAN Diesel in 2000. At the end of 2002, the works closed.

It was then an industrial estate, appropriately named Vulcan Industrial Estate; this site was just north of Winwick Junction, where the line to Newton-le-Willows branches off to the west from a spur of the West Coast Main Line to Liverpool Lime Street.

== The site today ==
All the former factory buildings on the site were demolished in October 2007; however, the workers' cottages, known as Vulcan Village, survive at the southern corner of the site.

By early 2010, work had started on the construction of 630 homes on the levelled site by the developer St Modwen.
