= Armstrong Whitworth =

Former British heavy engineering company

Sir W.G. Armstrong Whitworth & Co. (Engineers) Ltd
- Type: Private
- Industry: Engineering
- Predecessors: W.G. Armstrong & Company; Elswick Ordnance Company; Sir William Armstrong, Mitchell and Co.; Sir W.G. Armstrong & Company
- Founded: 1847 (W.G. Armstrong Co.)
- Founder: William George Armstrong
- Defunct: 1927
- Fate: Demergers; Take-over
- Successor: Vickers-Armstrongs
- Headquarters: Newcastle upon Tyne, England
- Products: Aircraft; Armaments; Locomotives; Ships
- Subsidiaries: Vickers Armstrong; Armstrong Siddeley (De-merged)

Sir W.G. Armstrong Whitworth & Co Ltd, widely known as Armstrong Whitworth among several similarly named variants, was a major British heavy engineering and manufacturing company that was at its peak in the early years of the 20th century. With headquarters in Elswick, Newcastle upon Tyne, Armstrong Whitworth built armaments, ships, locomotives, automobiles and aircraft.

The company was founded by William Armstrong in 1847, becoming Armstrong Mitchell and then Armstrong Whitworth through mergers. In 1927, it merged with Vickers Limited to form Vickers-Armstrongs, with its automobile and aircraft interests purchased by J D Siddeley.

== History ==
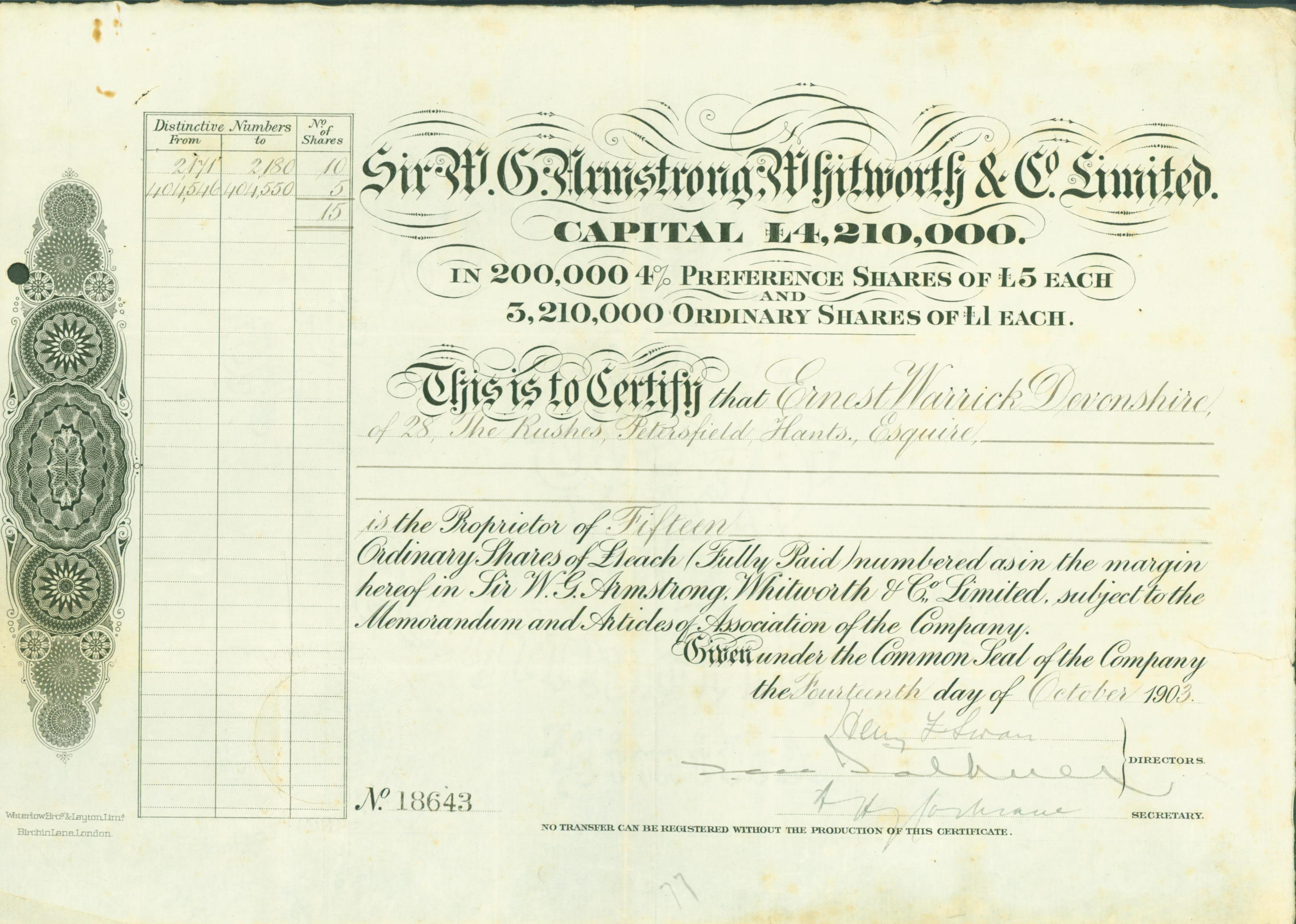
A share certificate issued by Sir W. G. Armstrong, Withworth & Co. Ltd in 1903

In 1847, the engineer William George Armstrong founded the Elswick works at Newcastle, to produce hydraulic machinery, cranes and bridges, soon to be followed by artillery, notably the Armstrong breech-loading gun, with which the British Army was re-equipped after the Crimean War. In 1882, it merged with the shipbuilding firm of Charles Mitchell to form Armstrong Mitchell & Company and at the time its works extended for over a mile (about 2 km) along the bank of the River Tyne. Armstrong Mitchell merged again with the engineering firm of Joseph Whitworth in 1897. The company expanded into the manufacture of cars and trucks in 1902, and created an "aerial department" in 1913, which became the Armstrong Whitworth Aircraft subsidiary in 1920. In 1927, it merged with Vickers Limited to form Vickers-Armstrongs.

=== Automobiles ===
The Armstrong Whitworth car was manufactured from 1904, when the company decided to diversify to compensate for a fall in demand for artillery after the end of the Boer War. It took over construction of the Wilson-Pilcher, designed by Walter Gordon Wilson, and produced cars under the Armstrong Whitworth name until 1919, when the company merged with Siddeley-Deasy and formed Armstrong Siddeley.

The Wilson-Pilcher was an advanced car, originally with a 2.4-litre engine, that had been made in London from 1901 until 1904, when production moved to Newcastle. When Armstrong Whitworth took over production, two models were made: a 2.7-litre flat four and a 4.1-litre flat six, the cylinders on both being identical with bore and stroke of 3.75in (95mm). The engines had the flywheel at the front, and the crankshaft had intermediate bearings between each pair of cylinders. Drive was to the rear wheels via a dual helical epicyclic gears and helical bevel axle. The cars were listed at £735 for the four and £900 for the six. They were still theoretically available until 1907. According to Automotor in 1904, "Even the first Wilson-Pilcher car that made its appearance created quite a sensation in automobile circles at the time on account of its remarkably silent and smooth running, and of the almost total absence of vibration".

The first Armstrong Whitworth car was the 28/36 of 1906 with a water-cooled, four-cylinder side-valve engine of 4.5 litres which unusually had "oversquare" dimensions of 120 mm (4.7 in) bore and 100 mm (3.9 in) stroke. Drive was via a four-speed gearbox and shaft to the rear wheels. A larger car was listed for 1908 with a choice of either 5-litre 30 or 7.6-litre 40 models sharing a 127 mm (5.0 in) bore but with strokes of 100 mm (3.9 in) and 152 mm (6.0 in) respectively. The 40 was listed at £798 in bare chassis form for supplying to coachbuilders. These large cars were joined in 1909 by the 4.3-litre 18/22 and in 1910 by the 3.7-litre 25, which seems to have shared the same chassis as the 30 and 40.

In 1911, a new small car appeared in the shape of the 2.4-litre 12/14, called the 15.9 in 1911, featuring a monobloc engine with pressure lubrication to the crankshaft bearings. This model had an 110-inch (2,800 mm) wheelbase compared with the 120 inches (3,000 mm) of the 40 range. This was joined by four larger cars ranging from the 2.7-litre 15/20 to the 3.7-litre 25.5.

The first six-cylinder model, the 30/50 with 5.1-litre 90 mm (3.5 in) bore by 135 mm (5.3 in) stroke engine came in 1912 with the option of electric lighting. This grew to 5.7 litres in 1913.

At the outbreak of war, as well as the 30/50, the range consisted of the 3-litre 17/25 and the 3.8-litre 20/30.

The cars were usually if not always bodied by external coachbuilders and had a reputation for reliability and solid workmanship. The company maintained a London sales outlet at New Bond Street. When Armstrong Whitworth and Vickers merged, Armstrong Whitworth's automotive interests were purchased by J D Siddeley as Armstrong Siddeley, based in Coventry.

An Armstrong Whitworth car is displayed in the Discovery Museum, Newcastle upon Tyne.

=== Aircraft ===
Armstrong Whitworth established an Aerial Department in 1912. This later became the Sir W. G. Armstrong Whitworth Aircraft Company. When Vickers and Armstrong Whitworth merged in 1927 to form Vickers-Armstrongs, Armstrong Whitworth Aircraft was bought out by J. D. Siddeley and became a separate entity.

=== Armaments ===
The Elswick Ordnance Company (sometimes referred to as Elswick Ordnance Works, but usually as "EOC") was originally created in 1859 to separate William Armstrong's armaments business from his other business interests, to avoid a conflict of interest as Armstrong was then Engineer of Rifled Ordnance for the War Office and the company's main customer was the British Government. Armstrong held no financial interest in the company until 1864 when he left Government service, and Elswick Ordnance was reunited with the main Armstrong businesses to form Sir W.G. Armstrong & Company. EOC was then the armaments branch of W.G. Armstrong & Company and later of Armstrong Whitworth.

In 1870, Armstrong became the British licensee for the Gatling Gun Company.

Elswick Ordnance was a major arms developer before and during World War I. The ordnance and ammunition it manufactured for the British Government were stamped EOC, while guns made for export were usually marked "W.G. Armstrong". The 28 cm howitzer L/10 which played a major role in the Siege of Port Arthur in the Russo-Japanese War was developed by Armstrong.

=== Locomotives ===
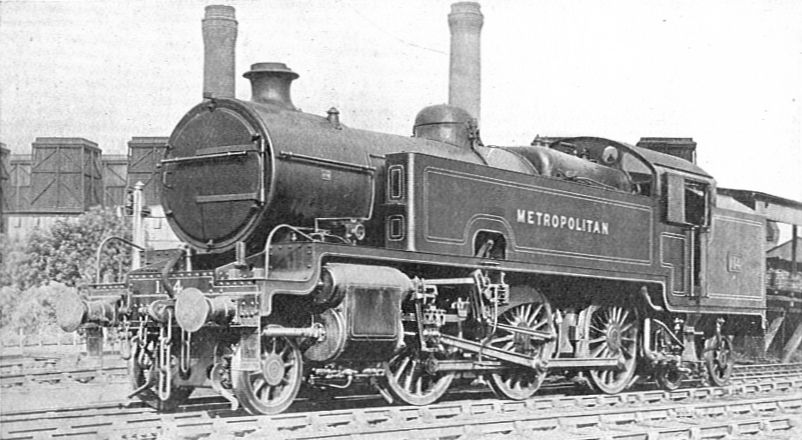
Metropolitan Railway K Class 2-6-4T locomotive

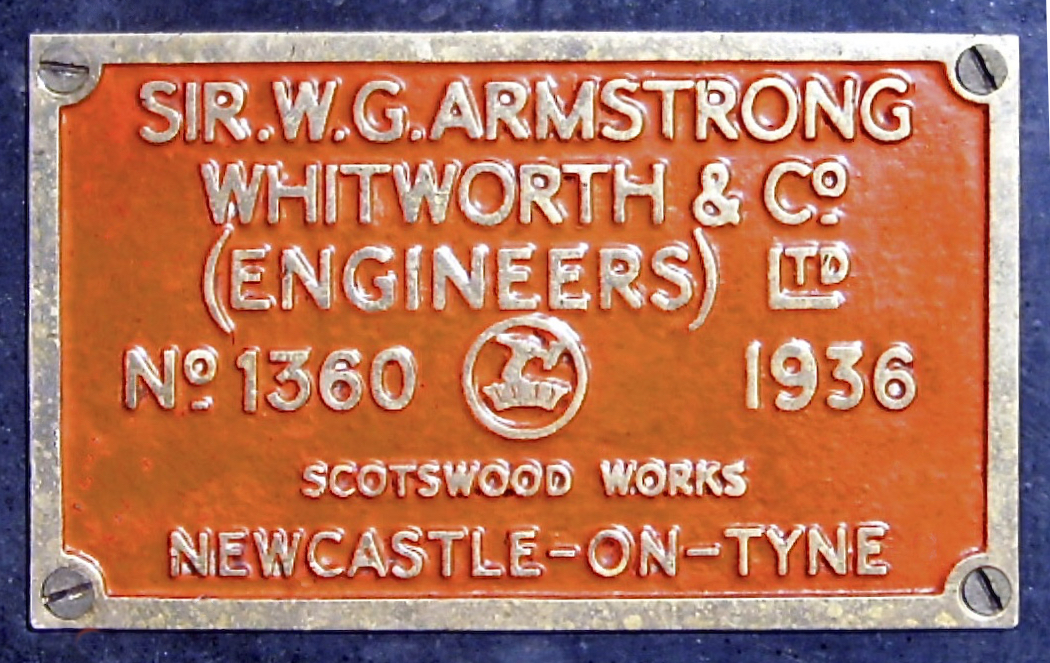
Works plate on Armstrong Whitworth-built LMS Stanier Class 5 4-6-0 45305 showing completion in 1936

After World War I, Armstrong Whitworth converted its Scotswood Works to build railway locomotives. From 1919 it rapidly penetrated the locomotive market due to its modern plant. Its two largest contracts were 200 2-8-0s for the Belgian State Railways in 1920 and 327 Black 5 4-6-0s for the LMS in 1935/36.

AW also modified locomotives. In 1926 Palestine Railways sent six of its H class Baldwin 4-6-0 locomotives to AW for conversion into 4-6-2 tank locomotives to work the PR's steeply graded branch between Jaffa and Jerusalem. PR also sent another six H Class Baldwins for their defective steel fireboxes to be replaced with copper ones.

AW's well-equipped works included its own design department and enabled it to build large locomotives, including an order for 30 engines of three types for the modernisation of the South Australian Railways in 1926. These included ten 500 class 4-8-2 locomotives, which were the largest non-articulated locomotives built in Great Britain, and were based on Alco drawings modified by AW and resident South Australian Railways engineers. They were a sensation in Australia. AW went on to build 20 large three-cylinder "Pacific" type locomotives for the Central Argentine Railway (F.C.C.A) in 1930, with Caprotti valve gear and modern boilers. They were the most powerful locomotives on the F.C.C.A.

AW obtained the UK license for Sulzer diesels from 1919, and by the 1930s was building diesel locomotives and railcars. An early example is the Tanfield Railway's 0-4-0 diesel-electric shed pilot, No.2, which was built by AW as works number D22 in 1933. In the same year, the company launched the UK's first mainline diesel locomotive, the 800 bhp "Universal". It was successful in trials, but not repaired after an engine crankcase explosion a year later. A total of 1464 locomotives were built at Scotswood Works before it was converted back to armaments manufacture in 1937.

=== Overseas operations ===
After World War I ended, demand for armaments and naval ships all but evaporated, and Armstrong Whitworth had to diversify its business.

The company built a hydro-electric station at Nymboida, New South Wales, near Grafton, Australia in 1923–1924.

The Dominion of Newfoundland, at that time an island country mostly dependent on its fishery, had plenty of pulpwood but only one paper mill at Grand Falls-Windsor and one pulp mill at Bishop's Falls, both built in the 1900s. The owners of the Reid Newfoundland Company convinced AW to invest in building a second paper mill at Corner Brook, to be supplied with hydro-electricity from a generating station 50 kilometres (31 miles) away at Deer Lake. A joint venture, the Newfoundland Power and Paper Company, was founded in 1923. After much fighting between Harry Reid and then-Prime Minister of the dominion, Richard Squires, the so-called Humber project (after the Humber River) received support from the local government and loan guarantees both from it and the UK; Squires even campaigned on it, making "Hum on the Humber" his slogan for the 1923 Newfoundland general election.

The company was heavily involved with the establishment of the town of Deer Lake. The hydro-electric station there was built between 1922 and 1925, while the canal system used by the hydro-electric station helped to expand the forestry operations in the area. Some of the equipment used in the construction of the Panama Canal was shipped to Newfoundland. The pulp and paper mill in Corner Brook began operations in 1925. Overall, AW spent about £5M (equivalent to £261 million in 2025) on the development, which went significantly over the original budget and led to an overdraft, only to witness a consistent decline in newsprint and pulp prices after 1923, which was caused by over-expansion of the Canadian industry that was not predicted by either party of the project, both lacking experience in the paper trade. Since on a falling paper market longtime players with established customer bases had a clear advantage, shareholders sold their well-working but over-leveraged and loss-making business to the International Paper & Power Company in 1927. The deal left AW with a loss of £2.8 million, and the whole group collapsed.

=== Shipbuilding ===
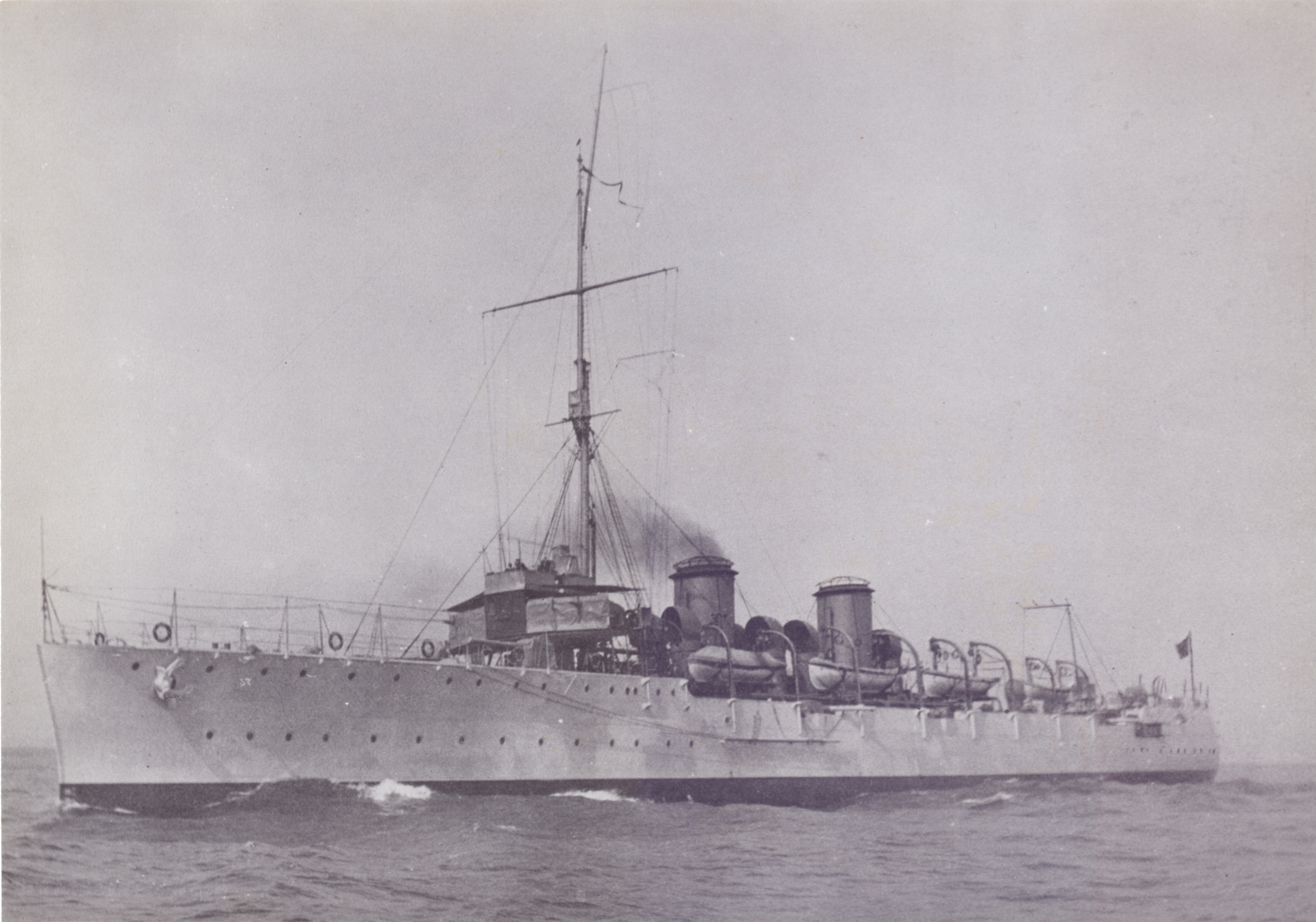
Brazil Navy ship Bahia

Shipbuilding was the major division of the company. From 1879 to 1880 the predecessor shipbuilding company of Charles Mitchell laid down a cruiser for the Chilean Navy at Low Walker Yard. This vessel was later supplied to Japan as the 'Tsukushi' of 1883; the ship was launched as of Armstrong Mitchell build. Between 1885 and 1918 Armstrong built warships for the Royal Navy, Beiyang Fleet, Imperial Russian Navy, Brazilian Navy, Imperial Japanese Navy, and the United States Navy. Amongst these were HMS Glatton which, due to bodged construction, suffered a magazine explosion in Dover Harbour less than one month after commissioning.

Armstrong Mitchell and later Armstrong Whitworth built many merchant ships, freighters, tank-ships, and dredgers; notable among them was the ice-breaking train ferries SS Baikal in 1897 and SS Angara in 1900, built to connect the Trans-Siberian Railway across Lake Baikal. The company built the first polar icebreaker in the world: Yermak was a Russian and later Soviet icebreaker, having a strengthened hull shaped to ride over and crush pack ice.

== Mergers and demergers ==
In 1927, the defence and engineering businesses merged with those of Vickers Limited to create a subsidiary company known as Vickers-Armstrongs. The aircraft and Armstrong Siddeley motors business were bought by J. D. Siddeley and became a separate entity. Production at the Scotswood Works ended in 1979 and the buildings were demolished in 1982.

== Products ==
=== Hydraulic engineering installations ===
The forerunner companies, W. G. Armstrong & Co. and later, from 1883 Sir WG Armstrong Mitchell & Company, were heavily involved in the construction of hydraulic engineering installations. Notable examples include:

- Development of the Hydraulic 'Jigger', and lifting apparatus, some exhibited at the 1851 Great Exhibition at the Crystal Palace, London.
- Hydraulic mains system, Limehouse Basin, London, 1850s
- Swing Bridge, River Tyne, 1873
- 120 ton hydraulic 'Sheer Leg' crane at Elswick Works, for transshipment to vessels.
- Tower Bridge, London, 1894
- A bascule bridge for the railway spanning over the River Bann, Coleraine, Ulster, Northern Ireland, 1921.
- A series of nine late-19th century 160-ton capacity hydraulic cranes for naval use. These were erected worldwide, in India (Bombay), Italy (La Spezia, Pozzuoli, Taranto and Venice), Liverpool, Malta and two more in Japan. The sole surviving example is undergoing partial restoration at Venice's Arsenale.

=== Ships ===
Between 1880 and 1925 they built a number of warships:

- Arturo Prat/Tsukushi (筑紫), Chilean Navy (intended)/ Imperial Japanese Navy, 1880
- Esmeralda/Izumi (和泉), Chilean Navy/ Imperial Japanese Navy, 1883
- HMCS Protector gunboat for the South Australian colonial navy, 1884
- Naniwa (浪速), Imperial Japanese Navy, 1885
- Elswick Cruisers, Zhiyuen Class Protected Cruiser, Protected cruiser: Jingyuan, Protected cruiser: Zhiyuen, Imperial Chinese Navy, 1887
- HMS Victoria, battleship built for the Royal Navy, delivered in 1891, she was accidentally rammed and sunk in 1893.
- Castore and Polluce, gunboats for the Italian Navy, 1888.
- Yoshino (吉野), Imperial Japanese Navy, 1892
- USS New Orleans (CL-22), United States Navy, 1895
- Esmeralda, Chilean Navy, 1895
- Yashima (八島), Imperial Japanese Navy, 1896
- Takasago (高砂), Imperial Japanese Navy, 1897
- O'Higgins, Chilean Navy, 1897
- Chacabuco, Chilean Navy, 1898
- Asama (浅間), Imperial Japanese Navy, 1898
- Tokiwa (常盤), Imperial Japanese Navy, 1898
- USS Albany (CL-23), United States Navy, 1898
- Yermak (Ермак), Imperial Russian Navy, 1898
- Angara, Imperial Russian Navy, 1899
- HNoMS Norge, Royal Norwegian Navy, 1899
- HNoMS Eidsvold, Royal Norwegian Navy, 1899
- Hatsuse (初瀬), Imperial Japanese Navy, 1899
- Izumo (出雲), Imperial Japanese Navy, 1899
- Iwate (磐手), Imperial Japanese Navy, 1900
- Southern Cross, Melanesian Mission Steamer, 1903
- HMS Swiftsure, Royal Navy, 1903
- Kashima (鹿島), Imperial Japanese Navy, 1905
- HMS Superb, Royal Navy, 1907
- Minas Geraes, Brazilian Navy, 1908
- Bahia, Brazilian Navy, 1909
- Rio Grande do Sul, Brazilian Navy, 1909
- HMS Monarch, Royal Navy, 1911
- HMS Canada, Royal Navy, 1913
- HMS Agincourt, battleship built for Ottoman Navy but confiscated by British in July 1914
- HMS Malaya, Royal Navy, 1915
- HMS Eagle, Royal Navy, 1918
- HMS Nelson, Royal Navy, 1925
- Isla de Luzón, Spanish Navy 1886-1887

They built oil tankers, including:

- British Emperor, British Tanker Company, 1916
- British Endeavour British Tanker Company, 1927
- British Ensign British Tanker Company, 1917
- British Isles British Tanker Company, 1917
- British Princess British Tanker Company, 1917
- British Progress British Tanker Company, 1927
- British Sovereign British Tanker Company, 1917
- San Felix Eagle Oil and Shipping Company, 1921

=== Locomotives ===
Armstrong Whitworth built a few railway locomotives between 1847 and 1868, but it was not until 1919 that the company made a concerted effort to enter the railway market.

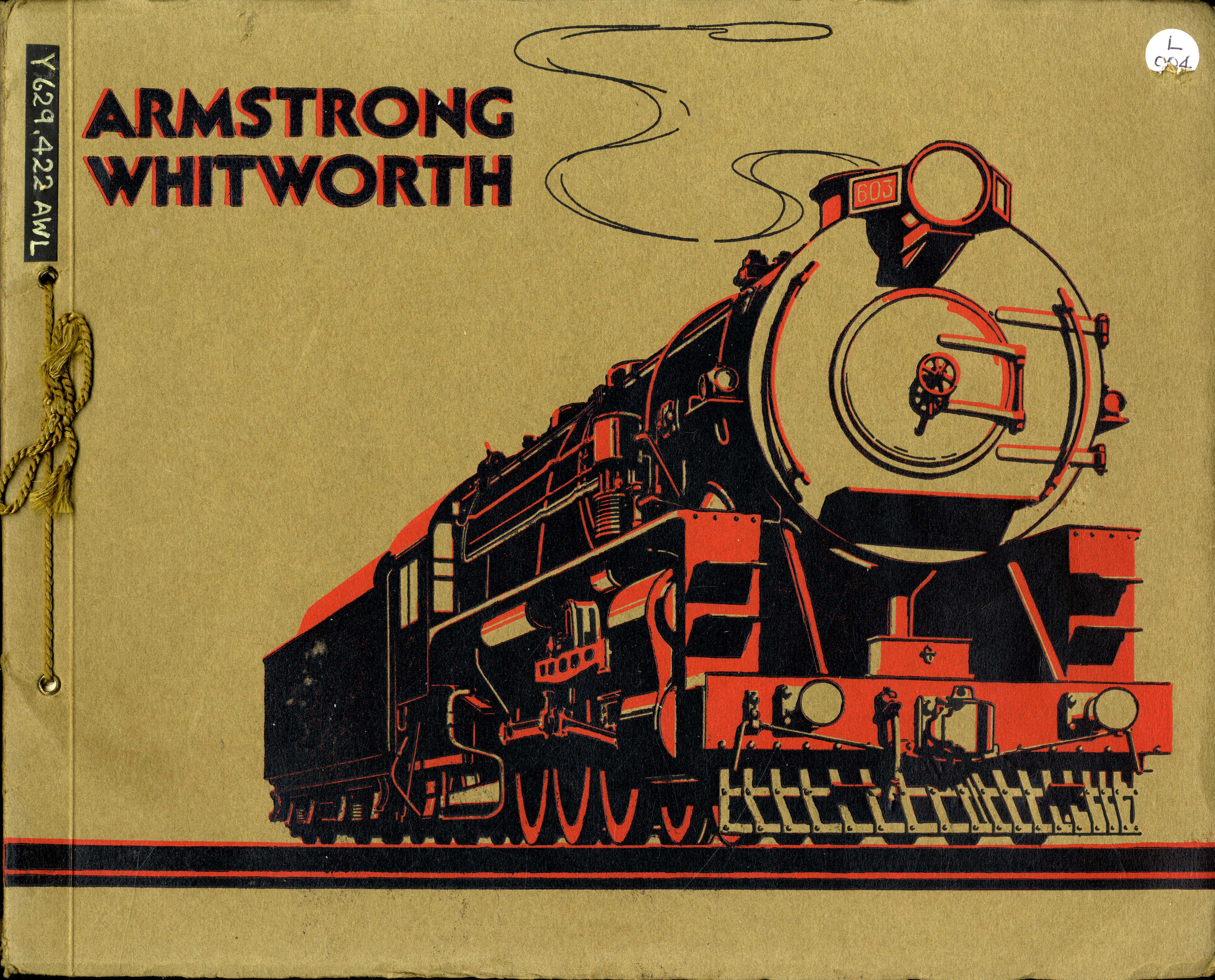
Many of the locomotives are shown in this catalogue in the collection of the North of England Institute of Mining and Mechanical Engineers

Contracts were obtained for the construction and supply of steam and diesel locomotives to railway systems in Britain and overseas, including those detailed in the following table.

Serial numbers	Year	Quantity	Customer	Class	Wheel arrangement	Road numbers	Notes
1–50	1919–1921	50	North Eastern Railway	T2	0-8-0	2253–2302	to LNER (same numbers) in 1923, class Q6; renumbered 3410–3459 in 1946 scheme.
69–93	1921	25	Bombay, Baroda and Central India Railway	G (BESA HGS)	2-8-0	122–146	later all-India 26528–26552.
94–110	1920	17	Madras and Southern Mahratta Railway	M (BESA HGS)	2-8-0	483–499	later all-India 26610–26626.
111–120	1921	10	Caledonian Railway	72	4-4-0	82–91	to LMS 14487–14496 in 1923
137–159	1922	23	North Western Railway	SGS	0-6-0	2484–2506	all except one to Pakistan at Partition; 2500 to Eastern Punjab Railway; later all-India 36889.
161–170	1922	10	Buenos Aires Western Railway	4F	2-6-2T	824–833	
175–179	1922–23	5	Midland Great Western Railway	Fa	0-6-0	44–48	to GSR 641–645 in 1925.
185–190	1923	6	Great Southern and Western Railway	400	4-6-0	407–409; 403–405	to GSR (same numbers) in 1925.
191-390	17 May 1921 to 12.01.1923	200	Belgian State Railways	Type 37	2-8-0	5001–5200	renumbered Type 31 in 1931. 162 upgraded between 1936 and 1947, unrebuilt engines renumbered Type 30
391–415	1922	25	North Eastern Railway	E1	0-6-0T	2313–2339	to LNER (same numbers) in 1923, class J72; renumbered 8721–8745 in 1946 scheme.
416–465	1921–22	50	Midland Railway	3835 / 4F	0-6-0	3937–3986	to LMS (same numbers) in 1923
466–467	Cancelled	(2)	Northern Counties Committee	(U)	4-4-0	—	Order cancelled; locomotives built at Derby Works instead.
468–472	1922	5	Somerset and Dorset Joint Railway	3835 / 4F	0-6-0	57–61	to LMS 4557–4561 in 1930
479–487	1923	9	North Western Railway	SGS	0-6-0	2536–2544	; to Eastern Bengal Railway 312–318/66/20 in 1929/39; four survivors became all-India 34265–67/73.
488–499	1923	12	North Western Railway	SPS	4-4-0	2989–2996, 3006–3009	three to Pakistan at Partition; remainder to Eastern Punjab Railway, later all-India 24481–28889.
500–515	1923	16	Bombay, Baroda and Central India Railway	A (BESA PTS)	2-6-4T	265–280	to North Western Railway 517–532 (not in order) in 1929; most to Pakistan at Partition; seven to Eastern Punjab Railway, later all-India 27106–27112.
516–535	1923	20	Oudh and Rohilkhand Railway	SGS	0-6-0	505–524	to East Indian Railway 1448–1457 in 1925; split between Eastern and Northern Railways, later all-India in range 34236–34243, 36804–36818.
536–552	1923	17	East Indian Railway	SGS	0-6-0	1390–1406	split between Eastern and Northern Railways, later all-India in range 34163–34164, 34218–34224, 36792–36811.
565–566	1924	2	Ferrocarril Pacífico de Colombia		4-6-0+0-6-4	29–30	
567–591	1923	25	Buenos Aires Great Southern Railway	11C	4-8-0	4201–4225	
605–616	1924	12	London and North Eastern Railway	D11/2	4-4-0	6388–6399	Renumbered 2683–2694 in 1946 scheme.
623–632	1926	10	South Australian Railways	600	4-6-2	600–609	
633–642	1926	10	South Australian Railways	500	4-8-2	500–509	
643–652	1926	10	South Australian Railways	700	2-8-2	700–709	
655–701	1924	47	Bengal Nagpur Railway	HSM	2-8-0	700–729, 744–760	later all-India 26174–26220.
702–707	1924	6	Metropolitan Railway	K	2-6-4T	111–116	to London and North Eastern Railway 6158–6163, class L2, in 1937; survivors allocated 9070–9073 in 1946 scheme.
714–725	1925	12	Buenos Aires and Pacific Railway	2101	4-6-2	2101–2112	
726–760	1925	35	Buenos Aires Great Southern Railway	11D	2-8-0	4301–4335	
761–769	1925	9	Southern Railway	K	2-6-4T	A791–A799	Rebuilt to U class 2-6-0
771–801	1925	31	Bengal Nagpur Railway	HSM	2-8-0	761–791	later all-India 26220–26251.
850–874	1927	25	Queensland Railways	C17	4-8-0	802–826	
875–884	1927	10	Ferrocarril Central Argentino	MS6A	4-8-4T	501–510	
885–904	1928	20	Egyptian State Railways	545	2-6-0		five appropriated by Israel Railways after the 1956 Israeli invasion of Sinai
905–934	1927	30	Buenos Aires Great Southern Railway	11C	4-8-0	4226–4255	
938–987	1928	50	Great Western Railway	5600	0-6-2T	6650–6699	
1005–1015	1929	11	Madras and Southern Mahratta Railway	XD	2-8-2	853–863	later all-India 22397–22407.
1016–1019	1929	4	Great Western of Brazil Railway		4-6-0	230–233	
1020–1023	1929	4	Great Western of Brazil Railway		4-8-0	234–237	
1024–1025	1929	2	Great Western of Brazil Railway		2-6-2+2-6-2	238–239	
1026–1037	1929	12	Ceylon Government Railway	B1	4-6-0	279–290	
1038–1057	1930	20	Ferrocarril Central Argentino	MS6A	4-8-4T	511–530	
1058–1068	1930	11	Eastern Bengal Railway	XB	4-6-2	443–453	to Pakistan at Partition.
1069–1080	1930	12	Madras and Southern Mahratta Railway	XB	4-6-2	200–211	later all-India 22131–22142.
1081–1100	1930	20	Ferrocarril Central Argentino	PS11	4-6-2	1101–1120	3-cylinder with Caprotti valve gear.
1105–1110	1931	6	Buenos Aires Western Railway	15	4-8-0	1500–1505	
1111–1130	1931	20	London and North Eastern Railway	K3/2	2-6-0	1100/01/02/06; 1108/17/18/19; 1121/25/33/35; 1137/41/54/56; 1158/62/64/66	Renumbered 1899–1918 in 1946 scheme.
1131–1155	1930–31	25	Great Western Railway	5700	0-6-0PT	7775–7799	
1156–1165	1934–35	10	London and North Eastern Railway	K3/2	2-6-0	1302/04/08; 1310/24/06; 2934–2937	Renumbered 1919–1928 in 1946 scheme.
1166–1265	1935	100	London, Midland and Scottish Railway	Stanier 5	4-6-0	5125–5224	
1266–1269	1935	4	Yue Han Railway, China	ET6	0-8-0	501–504	
1270–1279	1936	10	London and North Eastern Railway	K3/2	2-6-0	2417/29/45/46; 2453/55/58/65; 2471/72	Renumbered 1959–1968 in 1946 scheme.
1280–1506	1936–37	227	London, Midland and Scottish Railway	Stanier 5	4-6-0	5225–5451	
D8		1	Preston Docks		0-6-0de	Duchess	250 hp shunter
D9		1	Demonstrator		1-Co-1de		800 hp mixed-traffic diesel-electric
	1931	1	London and North Eastern Railway		Railcar	25	One Sulzer 6-cylinder engine of 250 hp.
	1932	2	London and North Eastern Railway		Railcar	224, 232	One Sulzer 6-cylinder engine of 250 hp.
	1933	1	London and North Eastern Railway		Railbus	294	One Saurer engine of 95 hp.
	1933	1	Buenos Aires Great Southern Railway		1A-Bo+Bo-A1	CM210	Two Sulzer 8LV34 engines of 850 hp.
D20	1933	1	London, Midland and Scottish Railway		0-6-0de	7408	250 hp shunter; renumbered 7058 in 1934; to have been renumbered 13000 by British Railways in 1948, but withdrawn before number applied.
D21–D26		6			0-4-0de		85 hp shunter
D27–D28	1934	2	Demonstrator		1-Co-1de		Sulzer 8LD28 engine, 800 hp, 66-inch gauge; trialled on Ceylon Government Railway; returned; to Buenos Aires Great Southern Railway in 1937.
D43	1934	1	Ceylon Government Railway	G1	0-4-0de	500	122 hp shunter.
D46–D51	1934	6	Madras and Southern Mahratta Railway	YZZT	Railcar	1–6	160 hp diesel-electric.
D54–D63	1936	10	London, Midland and Scottish Railway	—	0-6-0de	7059–7068	350 hp shunter; to War Department in 1942 (4) and 1944 (6).
D64	1936	1	Bombay, Baroda and Central India Railway	DE	0-6-0de	800	360 hp shunter.

== Armament ==
Cannons and other armament were produced by the Elswick Ordnance Company, the armament division of Armstrong Whitworth. An especially notable example is the Armstrong 100-ton gun.

== See also ==
- List of car manufacturers of the United Kingdom
