= Indian locomotive class XP =

Indian XP
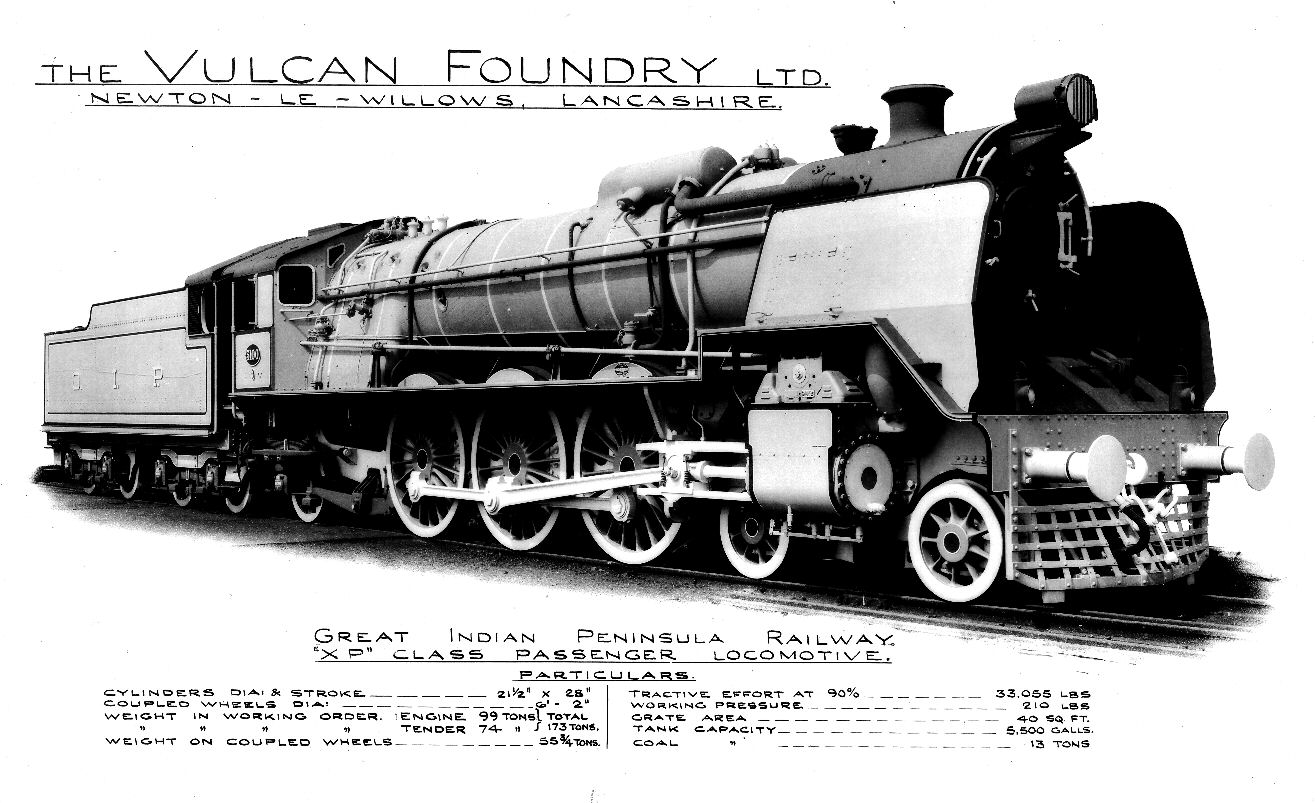
- Vulcan Foundry works photo of GIPR no. 3100.
Type and origin
- Power type: Steam
- Builder: Vulcan Foundry
- Serial number: 4694–4695
- Build date: 1937
- Total produced: 2
Specifications
- Configuration
  - Whyte: 4-6-2
  - UIC: 2′C1′h4
- Gauge: 5 ft 6 in (1,676 mm)
- Driver dia.: 6 ft 2 in (1.880 m)
- Axle load: 18 2/3 long tons (19.0 t; 20.9 short tons)
- Adhesive weight: 55.75 long tons (56.64 t; 62.44 short tons)
- Loco weight: 99 long tons (101 t; 111 short tons)
- Tender weight: 74 long tons (75 t; 83 short tons)
- Fuel type: Coal
- Fuel capacity: 13 long tons (13 t; 15 short tons)
- Water cap.: 5,500 imp gal (25,000 L; 6,600 US gal)
- Firebox
  - Grate area: 40 sq ft (3.7 m^{2})
- Boiler pressure: 210 psi (1.45 MPa)
- Cylinders: Two, outside
- Cylinder size: 21 1/2 in × 28 in (546 mm × 711 mm)
- Valve gear: Caprotti
Performance figures
- Tractive effort: 33,055 lbf (147.04 kN)
Career
- Operators: Great Indian Peninsula Railway; Indian Railways
- Number in class: 2
- Numbers: GIPR: 3100, 3101; IR: 22599, 22600
- Disposition: Both scrapped

The Indian locomotive class XP was a class of experimental 4-6-2 "Pacific" type steam locomotives used on 5 ft 6 in (1,676 mm) broad-gauge lines in India.

The two members of the class were built by Vulcan Foundry in Newton-le-Willows, Lancashire, England, to an order placed by the Great Indian Peninsula Railway (GIPR) in 1935.

== Background ==
The class XP was intended to have the power of the class XC heavy passenger Pacific locomotives, but the operating area of the light axle load class XB Pacifics.

The performance objectives set for the class XP were running mileages of 200,000 mi (320,000 km) between overhauls, and a monthly average mileage of 10,000 mi (16,000 km). Both of these objectives were very ambitious for the time.

== Design details ==
The basis for the class XP design was the boiler and firebox of the XB, with some modification to their details. The wheels and cylinders of the two classes had the same dimensions.

The XP's boiler pressure was higher, and its tractive effort was greater, than those of both the XB and the XC.

Both class XP locomotives were fitted with Caprotti valve gear, and roller bearings on all engine and tender wheels. The class leader's bearings were supplied by Timken, and its classmate's bearings were by Skefco.

In 1946, when the Indian government ordered the 16 class WP prototypes, their design was based on that of the class XP.

== Service history ==
The class XP locomotives entered service with the GIPR in 1937, as nos. 3100 and 3101.

The class leader was named King George, in honour of the then King-Emperor of India, and the other class XP engine was named Queen Elizabeth, after the then Queen-Empress.

In November 1951, the GIPR was incorporated into the Central Railway zone of the Indian Railways. In the All-India renumbering of 1957, the two class XP locomotives were given the numbers 22599 and 22600, respectively.

Both locomotives had been withdrawn from service by 1970.

== See also ==
- Rail transport in India § History
- Indian Railways
- Locomotives of India
