= LMS diesel shunters 7059-7068 =

LMS 7059–7068
Type and origin
- Power type: Diesel-electric
- Builder: Armstrong Whitworth
- Serial number: D54–D63
- Build date: 1936
- Total produced: 10
Specifications
- Configuration
  - Whyte: 0-6-0DE
  - UIC: C
- Gauge: 4 ft 8 1/2 in (1,435 mm)
- Wheel diameter: 4 ft 3 in (1.295 m)
- Wheelbase: 14 ft 6 in (4.42 m)
- Length: 31 ft 4.5 in (9.56 m)
- Loco weight: 52 long tons (52.8 t)
- Fuel capacity: 630 imp gal (2,900 L; 760 US gal)
- Prime mover: Armstrong-Sulzer 6LTD22 6-cyl
- Transmission: Crompton Parkinson
- Train heating: None
- Loco brake: Air
- Train brakes: None
Performance figures
- Maximum speed: 20 mph (32 km/h)
- Power output: 350 hp (261 kW) at 875 rpm
Career
- Operators: London, Midland and Scottish Railway; War Department; Nederlandse Spoorwegen; NMBS/SNCB; Egyptian State Railways
- Numbers: LMS: 7059–7068; WD: 70019–70022 and 70213–70218; NS: 521, 522; NMBS/SNCB: 230.001, 231.101 – 231.103; ESR: 4021–4022
- Withdrawn: 1966 - 1968
- Disposition: Scrapped

LMS diesel shunters 7059–7068 were 0-6-0 diesel-electric shunters built by Armstrong Whitworth in 1936. Maker's numbers D54-D63. The diesel engine was an Armstrong-Sulzer 6LTD22 of 350 bhp (260 kW) at 875 rpm (400 bhp (300 kW) at 1,000 rpm on overload). There was a single Crompton Parkinson traction motor with a rating of 231 hp (172 kW) (continuous) or 358 hp (267 kW) (one hour). Final drive was by double reduction gears of 11.1:1 ratio and jackshafts. These locomotives were similar in appearance to LMS 7080–7119 (which became British Rail Class D3/7) although the internal equipment was different. They started work in 1936 and were allocated to Crewe South (7059–7063) and Kingmoor (7064–7068).

== War Department use ==
All ten locomotives were requisitioned by the War Department in 1940–1941 and some were sent abroad to France, the Netherlands, Belgium or Egypt. The four sent to Egypt were numbered MEF19–MEF22 (MEF = Middle East Forces) but, in 1944, they were re-numbered 70019–70022. The other six retained their LMS numbers until 1944 when they received WD numbers 70213–70218.

== Individual histories ==
History of the locomotives during and after World War II is complex, because they were so widely scattered. It is necessary to describe them individually:

LMS 7059

Served in France and Belgium. WD number 70213. Given unofficial name "Old Joe". Later bought by SNCB and numbered 230.001. Withdrawn March 1958.

LMS 7060

Served in Egypt. WD numbers MEF19, 70019. Withdrawn 1945 and "canalised" at Suez. This presumably means it was dumped in the Suez Canal so it might still be there, although it would be heavily corroded.

LMS 7061

Served in France, Belgium and the Netherlands. WD number 70214. Given unofficial name "Pluto". Later bought by SNCB and numbered 231.101. Withdrawn February 1965.

LMS 7062

Remained in the UK. WD number 70215. Given unofficial name "Flying Scotsman". Re-numbered 882 in 1952. Transferred to British Army of the Rhine by 1958. Sold 1959 to LKW-Union Dortmund. Disposal unknown.

LMS 7063

Remained in the UK. WD number 70216. Re-numbered 883 in 1952. Used at Cairnryan Military Railway and Bicester Depot. Sold to E. L. Pitts Ltd, Brackley, August 1963. Lent to Central Electricity Generating Board and used at Hams Hall Power Station 1966. Later scrapped.

LMS 7064

Served in France, Belgium and the Netherlands. WD number 70217. Given unofficial name "Ubique" (Latin for "everywhere" and the motto of the Corps of Royal Engineers). Later bought by SNCB and numbered 231.102. Withdrawn May 1961.

LMS 7065

Served in Egypt. WD numbers MEF20, 70020. Taken into Egyptian State Railways stock c. 1954 as number 4022. Disposal unknown.

LMS 7066

Served in Egypt. WD numbers MEF21, 70021. Withdrawn 1945. Scrapped 1951–2.

LMS 7067

Served in France and Belgium. WD number 70218. Later bought by SNCB and numbered 231.103. Withdrawn January 1966.

LMS 7068

Served in Egypt. WD numbers MEF22, 70022. Taken into Egyptian State Railways stock as number 4021. Disposal unknown.

== See also ==
- LMS diesel shunters
