= Nechells power stations =

English electricity generating stations

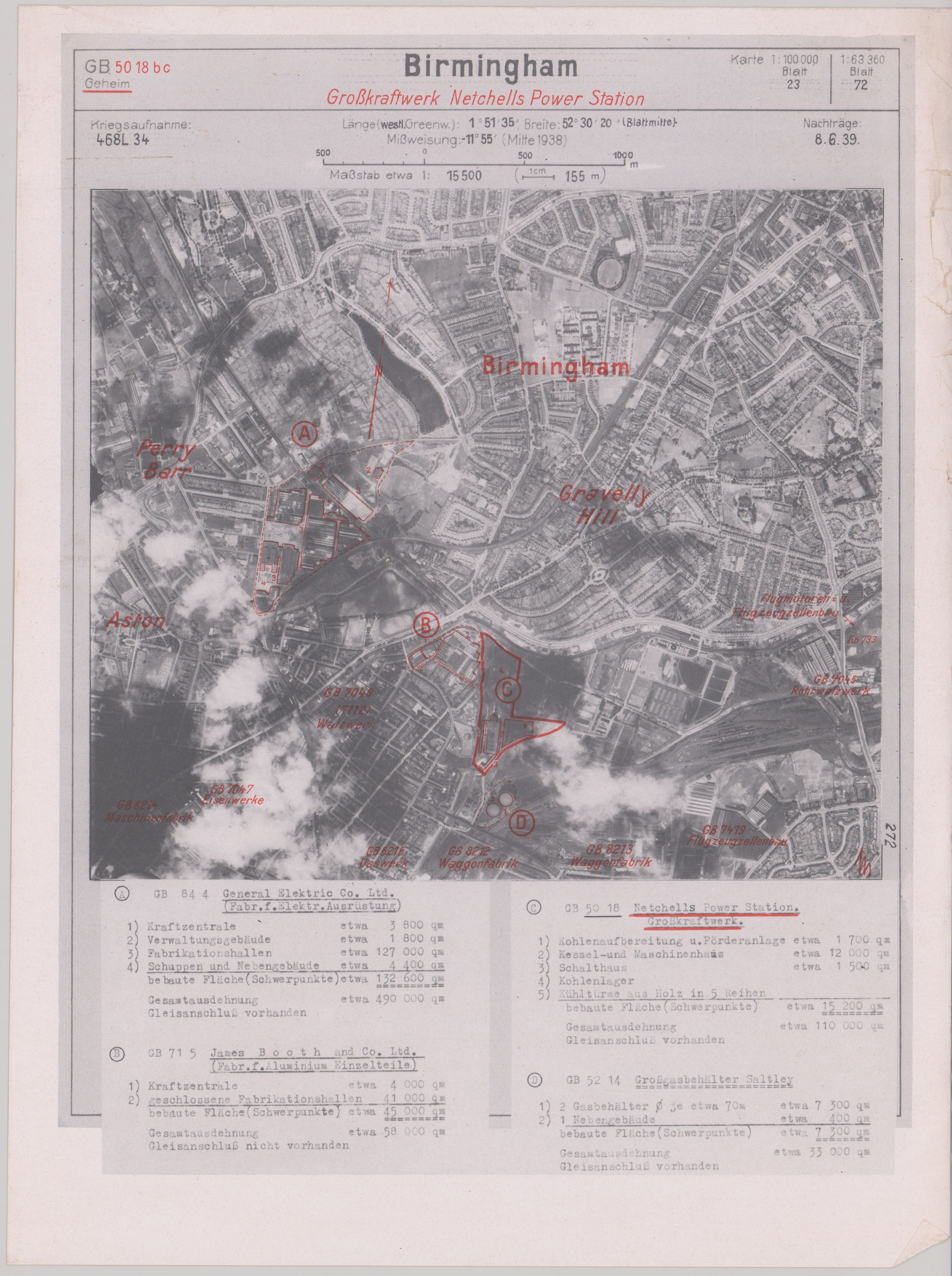
- 1939 target dossier of the German Luftwaffe for Nechells Power Station & surrounding area (Nechells is marked with the circled "C")
- Country: United Kingdom
- Location: Birmingham
- Coordinates: 52°30′20″N 01°51′20″W
- Status: Demolished
- Commission date: Temporary 1914; A station 1922; B station 1951
- Decommission date: A 1969; B 1982
- Operators: Birmingham Corporation; BEA; CEA; CEGB

Thermal power station
- Primary fuel: Coal
- Turbine technology: Steam generation
- Cooling towers: A: 35; B: 4
- Cooling source: Cooling towers

Power generation
- Units operational: Temporary 2 x 5 MW & 2 x 6 MW; A station 6 x 18.75 MW & 2 x 1.875 MW; B station 4 x 52.5 MW
- Make and model: BT-H, GEC, Parsons
- Nameplate capacity: A 117.75 MW; B 200 MW
- Annual net output: See tables

Nechells power stations were three coal-fired electricity generating stations in Nechells that supplied electricity to Birmingham and the surrounding area from 1915 to 1982.

== History ==
Birmingham had been supplied with electricity from several local generating stations. These included Dale End, 1.5 MW (1891); Water Street, 3.5 MW (1895); Aston Manor, 7 MW, (1903); Handsworth, 1.05 MW (1905); and Summer Lane, 36.5 MW (1906). The growth of demand for electricity meant that increasing generating capacity was needed. A large power station at Nechells was identified in 1912 as being necessary to meet current and future demand.

At the start of the First World War the Birmingham Corporation together with Shropshire, Worcestershire and Staffordshire Electric Power Company proposed to build two large power stations one at Nechells (2 × 15 MW alternators) and one at Stourport (3 × 15 MW machines) to meet their needs. However, the estimated cost of £2.75 million was too much and the government refused to support the proposal.

== Nechells Temporary station ==
The 1914-18 war created an additional significant demand for electricity. The City of Birmingham Electricity Supply Department decided that a temporary power station should be constructed at Nechells rather than to wait for the large power station to be built and commissioned. The temporary station was completed in 1915. The station was owned and operated by the City of Birmingham Electricity Supply Department.

The plant comprised:

- Boilers with a total steam generating capacity of 420,000 lbs/hour (52.9 kg/s)
- Two 5.0 MW Westinghouse turbo-alternators
- Two 6.0 MW BTH turbo-alternators

The total electricity output capacity was 22.0 MW. The temporary station was decommissioned and demolished in the late 1920s.

== Nechells A (Prince's station) ==
Construction started in 1919 on a 23-acre (9.3 ha) site adjoining the temporary power station and commercial operation began in 1922. It was inaugurated by the Prince of Wales on 13 June 1923. The Prince started up no.1 turbo-alternator, unveiled a bronze plaque commemorating his visit and was presented with a model of the generator. The A station was owned and operated by the City of Birmingham Electricity Supply Department. Following nationalisation of the electricity generation, transmission and supply industry in 1948 ownership was transferred to the British Electricity Authority (1948–55), followed by the Central Electricity Authority (1955–58) and finally to the Central Electricity Generating Board (1958–69).

The plant at the A station comprised:

- Boilers, 17 Babcock & Wilcox, and one Simon Carves with a total evaporative capacity of 694,000 lbs/hour (87.4 kg/s). Steam conditions were 320 psi and 710 °F (22.1 barg and 377 °C)
- Two 18.75 MW British Thomson-Houston turbo-alternators
- Four 18.75 MW General Electric Company turbo-alternators
- Two 1.875 MW DC turbo-generators
- Cooling was by 35 wooden cooling towers with a total capacity of 6.057 million gallons per hour (7.65 m^{3}/s)

The station was commissioned in phases as the generating machines were available, these were in July 1922, November 1922, June 1924, March 1925, September 1925, and May 1927. Turbo-alternators 5 and 6 were supplied with steam from the B station.

The output of the A station over the period 1946-69 was:

Nechells A power station output
Year	Electricity supplied (GWh)	Maximum capacity (MW)
1946	84.78	90.90
1947	104.0	94.2
1948	92.49	92
1950	103.97	93
1954	29.62	75
1955	37.62	75
1956	26.87	100
1957	25.71	100
1958	1.72	100
1961	4.25	74
1962	24.11	74
1963	10.81	74

The A station was closed in 1969.

== Nechells B ==
Nechells B was approved by the Central Electricity Board in 1945. It was built adjacent to the A station. The B station was owned and operated by the British Electricity Authority (1948–55), the Central Electricity Authority (1955–58) and finally to the Central Electricity Generating Board (1958–82).

The plant comprised:

- Boilers, 12 International Combustion, with a total evaporative capacity of 2,760,000 lbs/hour (348 kg/s). Steam conditions were 675 psi and 850 °F (46.56 barg and 454 °C)
- Four Parsons 52.5 MW turbo-alternators
- Cooling was by three ferro-concrete cooling towers each of 4 million gallons per hour (5.05 m^{3}/s)

The station opened in stages: June 1951, December 1951, November 1952 and September 1953.

The output of the station over the period 1954 to 1982 was:

Nechells B power station output
Year	Electricity supplied (GWh)	Maximum capacity (MW)
1954	1021	200
1955	1175	200
1956	1097	200
1957	1008	200
1958	917	200
1961	796	212
1962	764	212
1963	741	212
1972	456	212
1979	219	212
1982	55.0	212

The B station closed on 1 November 1982. It was subsequently demolished.

== See also ==
- Hams Hall power stations
