= Indian locomotive class PT =

Indian steam locomotive class

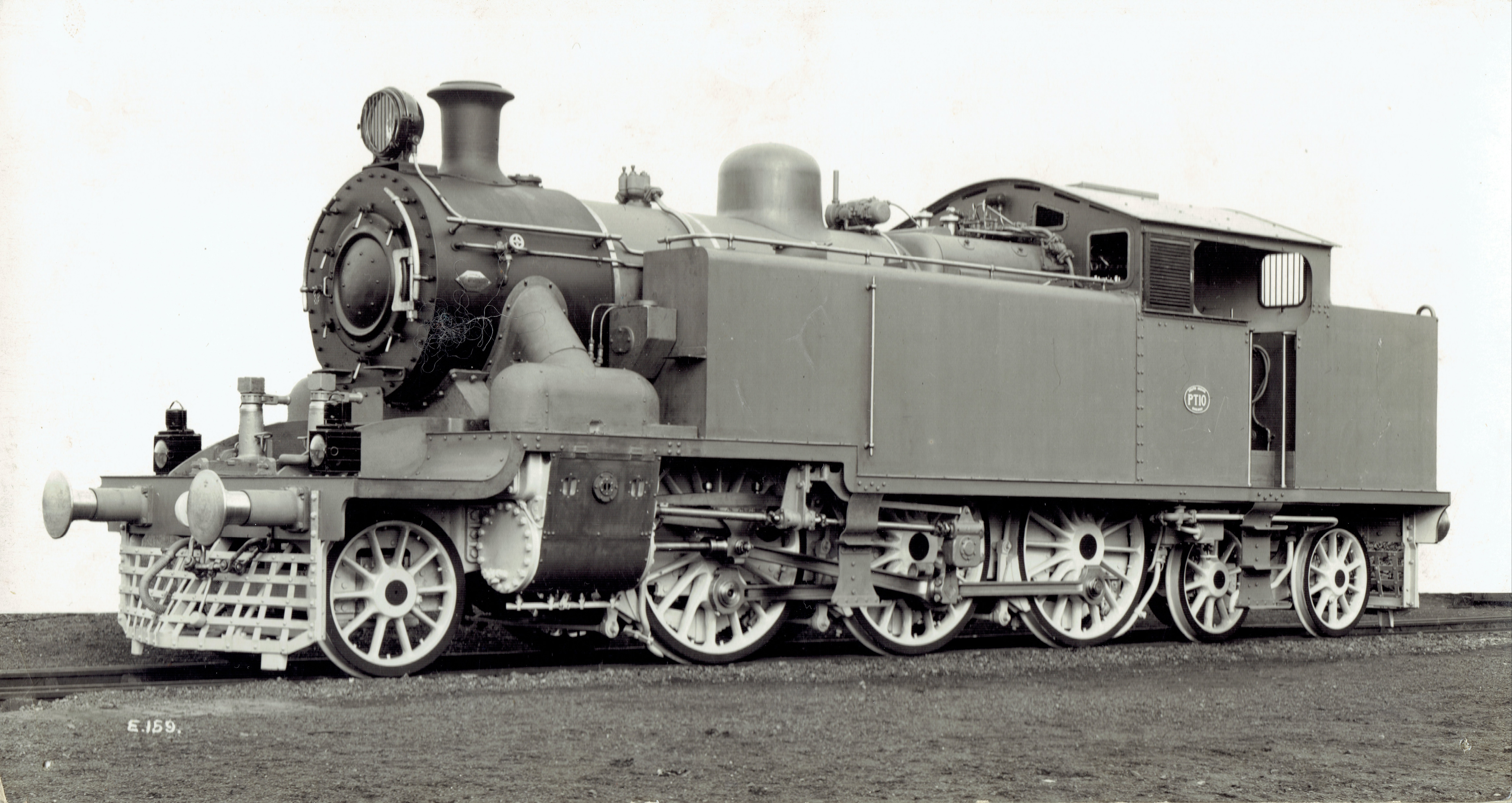
- Robert Stephenson & Co. work's photo of SIR No. 10 (RSC No. 4117)
Type and origin
- Power type: Steam
- Designer: British Engineering Standards Association
- Builder: Kitson & Co. (F/FS class); Robert Stephenson & Co. (SIR locomotives)
- Serial number: 4114-4120 (SIR Lentz locomotives)
- Build date: 1936 (SIR locomotives)
- Total produced: 7 (SIR Lentz locomotives)
Specifications
- Configuration
  - Whyte: 2-6-4T
  - UIC: 1′C2′ n2t (PT class); 1′C2′ h2t (PTS/PTC class)
- Gauge: 1,676 mm (5 ft 6 in)
- Leading dia.: 3 ft 7 in (1,090 mm)
- Coupled dia.: 5 ft 1 1/2 in (1,562 mm)
- Trailing dia.: 3 ft 7 in (1,090 mm)
- Wheelbase
  - Engine: 34 ft 3 in (10.44 m)
  - Coupled: 13 ft 0 in (3.96 m)
- Length
  - Over buffers: 43 ft 7 1/2 in (13.297 m)
- Axle load: 15 long tons (15 t)
- Loco weight: 76.5 t (75.3 long tons; 84.3 short tons)
- Fuel capacity: 3 t (3.0 long tons; 3.3 short tons) of coal.
- Water cap.: 2,000 imp gal (9,100 L; 2,400 US gal)
- Firebox
  - Type: Belpaire
  - Grate area: 25.3 sq ft (2.35 m^{2})
- Boiler
  - Diameter: Standard type: 5 ft 1 1/4 in (1,556 mm); SP/SG type: 4 ft 8 1/2 in (1,435 mm)
- Boiler pressure: 180 psi (12.4 bar; 12.7 kgf/cm^{2})
- Superheater: Schmidt (PTS/PTC class)
- Cylinders: Two, inside (Original design); Two, outside (SIR locomotives)
- Cylinder size: 18.5 in × 26 in (470 mm × 660 mm)
- Valve gear: Rotary Lentz (SIR locomotives); Walschaerts (Other locomotives)
Career
- Disposition: One SIR locomotive preserved, remainder scrapped.
- Reference: except where noted.

The Indian locomotive class PT (Passenger Tank) were a class of 2-6-4T broad gauge passenger tank locomotives that were one of seven standard broad-gauge locomotive designs developed by the British Engineering Standards Committee (BESC, later the British Engineering Standards Association (BESA)) for the broad-gauge railways of British India.

== History ==
The PT class was first catalogued in the second edition of the BESA report on standard locomotive classes for the railways of British India of 1907. Robert Stephenson and Company built seven PT class locomotives for the South Indian Railway (SIR) in 1936, bearing works numbers 4114 to 4120. This batch differed significantly from the earlier F and FS classes (which correlate to the original BESA design with internal valve gear) by being fitted with outside cylinders. In service, the locomotives were used in heavy suburban traffic, and were numbered 7 to 13. Number 11 has been preserved and is on display in the National Rail Museum of India in New Delhi.

== Design ==
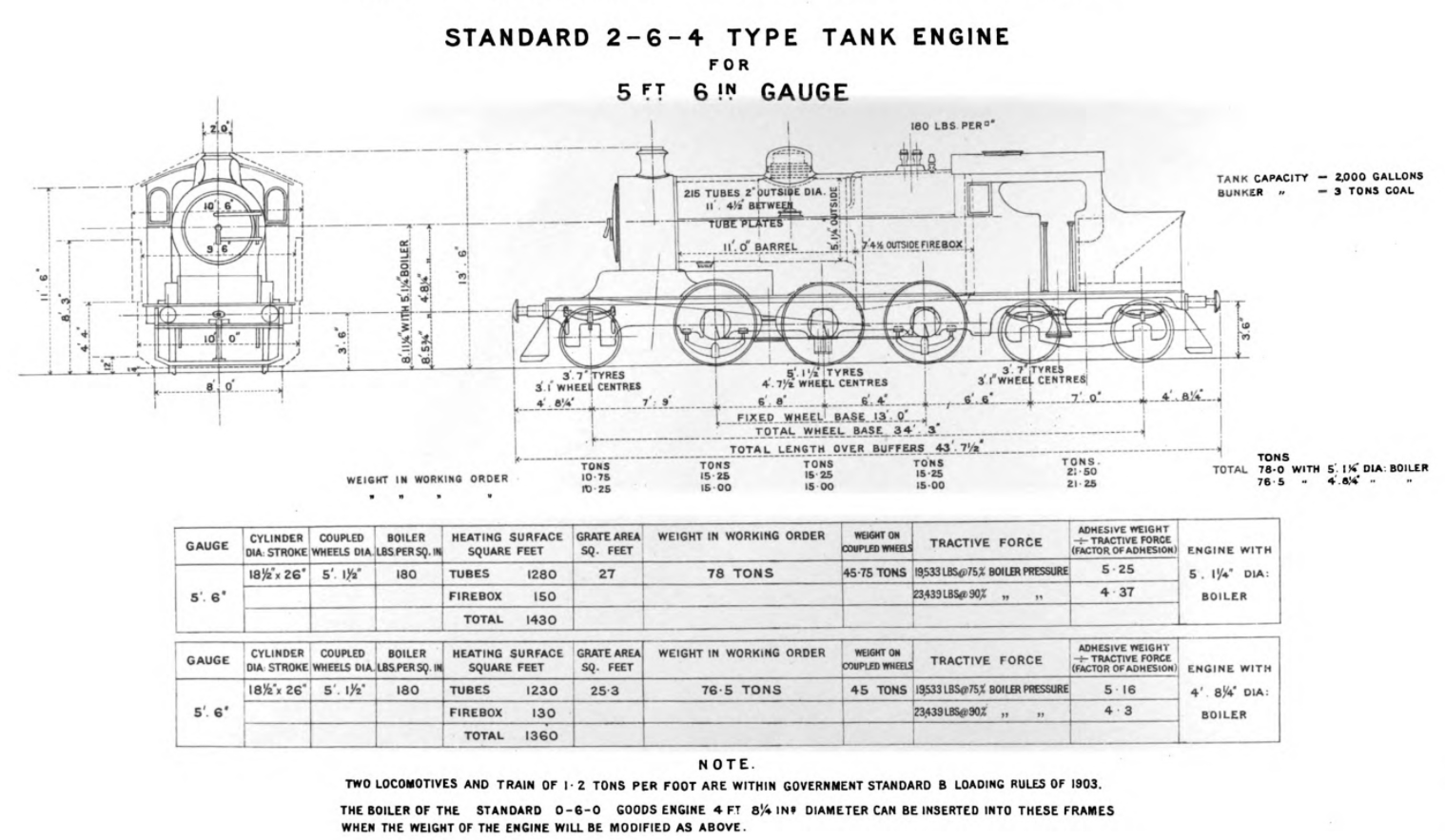
Drawing of the original design from the BESA's second report from 1907 (note the lack of external cylinders).

Three design variants of the PT class, each with different boilers, were listed in the 1907 BESC report. A larger standard boiler with a diameter of 5 ft 1 1/4 in (1556 mm) was developed for the PT, which was also listed as a variant in the third BESA report for the SP and SG class locomotives. Alternatively, the existing boilers from the SP and SG classes could also be used, provided that the weight of the locomotive was altered in accordance with the requirements of the report. The PTS variant was fitted with a Schmidt superheater - the S stands for superheated. In contrast to the design recommendations of the BESA report, the SIR locomotives were fitted with external Lentz rotary valve gear.

== Bibliography ==
- Hughes, Hugh (1979). Steam locomotives in India, Part 3 – Broad Gauge. Harrow, Middlesex: The Continental Railway Circle. ISBN 978-0-9503469-4-6.
