= Hams Hall power stations =

Series of now demolished coal-fired power stations

Hams Hall Power Station
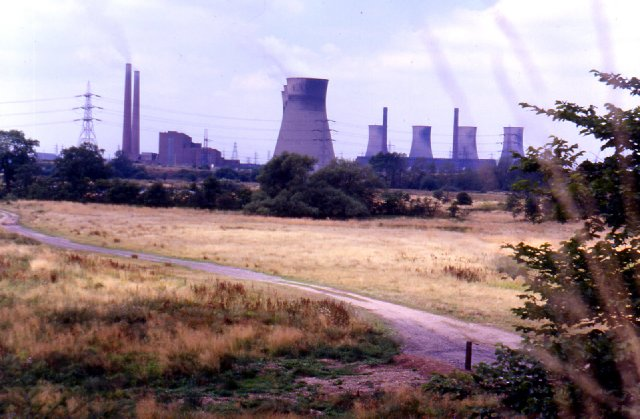
- Hams Hall B and C power stations Viewed from the east in August 1984
- Country: England
- Location: Warwickshire, West Midlands
- Coordinates: 52.524608°N 1.705175°W
- Status: Decommissioned and demolished
- Construction began: A: 1927, B: 1937, C: 1953
- Commission date: A: 1928, B: 1942, C: 1956
- Decommission date: A: 1975, B: 1981, C: 1992
- Operators: City of Birmingham Electricity Supply Department (1928–1948); British Electricity Authority (1948–1955); Central Electricity Authority (1955–1957); Central Electricity Generating Board (1958–1990); Powergen (1990-1992)

Thermal power station
- Primary fuel: Coal
- Cooling source: River water and cooling towers

Power generation
- Units operational: C station: 6 × 65 MW

External links
- Commons: Related media on Commons

Hams Hall Power Station refers to a series of three, now demolished coal-fired power stations, situated in Warwickshire in the West Midlands of England, 9 miles (14 km) northeast of Birmingham city centre.

== History ==
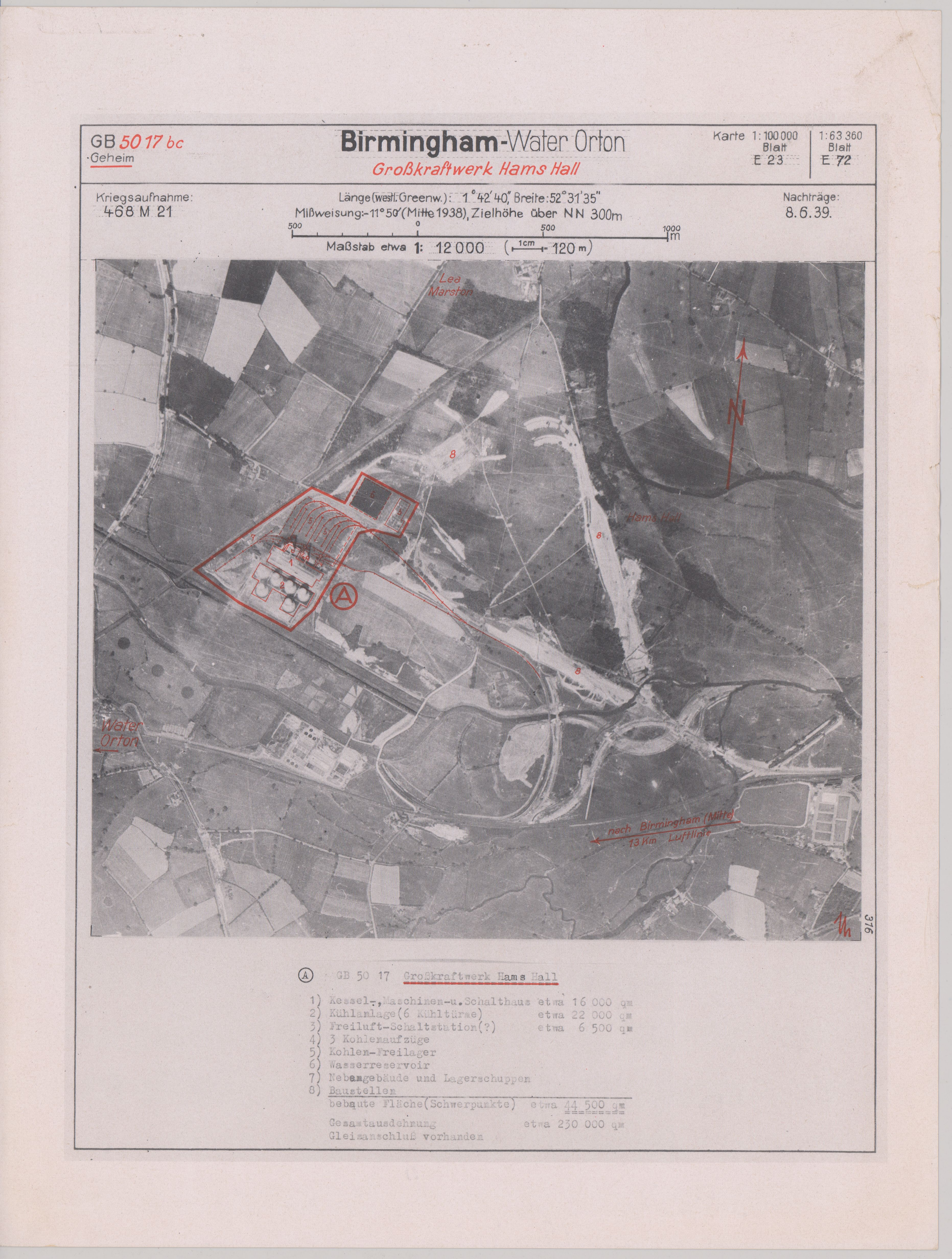
Target dossier of the German Luftwaffe targeting Hams Hall power station, 1939

=== Hams Hall A ===
Following the death of Lord Norton in 1905, his estate was put up for sale in 1911. Part of the house was rebuilt near Cirencester, but the rest was demolished in 1920. Birmingham Corporation Electricity Supply Committee thought Hams Hall a suitable site to build a power station because of a ready supply of water in the Tame Valley, and nearness to the Warwickshire Coalfield and the Midland Railway. It was felt the Nechells power station under construction in 1919 would only have sufficient capacity to meet the needs of Birmingham for ten years. Hams Hall Power Station was constructed by the municipally owned City of Birmingham Electricity Supply Department on the site in 1928. It was opened on 6 November 1929, equipped with two Fraser & Chalmers 30,000 kW turbo-alternators. The generating capacity of the site was progressively increased to 240,000 kW. The station burned approximately 774,000 tonnes of coal a year. At the time, it was one of the largest power stations in Europe.

The station was also the first power station in the United Kingdom to burn pulverised coal, rather than lumps of coal. It was also used as a prototype site for the installation of gas turbines in coal-fired plants. Water for the station was cooled by six reinforced concrete hyperbolic cooling towers. At the time, these were the largest cooling towers ever built. The station had two 350 feet (110 m) tall chimneys.

In 1962 a 15 MW Bristol Siddeley Olympus aircraft gas turbine was commissioned. It was used to assess the suitability of aircraft gas turbine generators for meeting peak-load and emergency requirements. The installed capacity and electricity output is summarised in the table.

Hams Hall A electricity capacity and output
Year	1946	1954	1955	1956	1957	1958	1961	1962	1963	1967	1971	1979
Installed capacity, MW		230	230	230	230	230	261.7	261.7	261.7	255	165	15
Electricity output, GWh	810	352	423	397	314	163	109.6	118.8	224.6	213.3	47	0.91

The station's closure was announced in 1975, following a fall in electricity consumption. By the time of its closure its generating capacity had fallen to 151 MW. The station's chimneys and cooling towers were demolished in 1978. A gas-turbine rated at 15 MW associated with the A station was operational in 1980.

During the Second World War the station given its strategic value was guarded by the regular army till September 1942 (probably an anti-aircraft battery and a Home Guard company (formed from the staff; they also guarded the Nechells power stations) which remained on guard till being stood down on 1 October 1944. Before war was declared cables nearby were damaged by explosives – a rare example of possible sabotage. The Home Guard website records both power station sites were attacked (minus details).

=== Hams Hall B ===
The second station on the site, Hams Hall B Power Station, was planned in 1937. It began generating electricity in 1942. The station was expanded between 1946 and 1949. In 1947 the B station had the highest thermal efficiency of any plant in the UK. The station had a generating capacity of 160,500 kW. With its completion the two stations formed the greatest concentration of generating plant in Europe. Its water was cooled by four cooling towers. The station used Parsons turbo-alternators. These were supplied with steam from the Stirling (4) and Yarrow (4) boilers which delivered 450.0 kg/s of steam at 44.8 bar and 441 °C. In 1980/1 the station sent out just 575 MWh.

In December 1945 there was complaint about pollution from the station. This was caused by a corroded metal connection between the boilers and the chimneys. The pollution continued until 1948, when the connection was eventually replaced.

The combined Hams Hall "A" and "B" stations were nationalised on 1 April 1948 under the terms of the Electricity Act 1947. The installed capacity and electricity output is summarised in the table.

Hams Hall B electricity capacity and output
Year	1946	1954	1955	1956	1957	1958	1961	1962	1963	1967	1971	1979	1981
Installed capacity, MW		300	300	300	300	300	348	348	348	330	330	330	330
Electricity output, GWh	989	1,519	1,615	1,692	1,510	1,305	1241.5	1287	1175	1110	835	431	0.6

The station closed on 26 October 1981 after 39 years of operation. It had a generating capacity of 306 MW at the time of its closure. Its four cooling towers were demolished in November 1985, with chimney number 2 going down in September 1988.

=== Hams Hall C ===
The third, final station to be constructed on the site was Hams Hall C Power Station, built in the 1950s and commissioned between 1956 and 1958. The station's water was cooled by three 350 feet (110 m) high natural draft cooling towers. It generated 360 MW of electricity using six Fraser & Chalmers-GEC turbo alternator sets each of 60 MW. The turbo-alternators were supplied with steam from the Simon-Carves boilers which produced 788 kg/s (550,000 lb/hr) of steam at 241.3/158.6 bar and 593/566 °C. In 1980/1 the station sent out 3,439.623 GWh, the thermal efficiency was 29.60 per cent.

In 1968, the station was under consideration to be converted to fuelled by natural gas, after a successful experimental trial of the fuel in one of the station's boilers earlier in the year. In October 1968 permission for the conversion was refused due to difficulties in the coal industry. Despite this, talk of conversion started again in 1970, and following discussion with the National Coal Board and the National Union of Mineworkers, permission was granted for the station to co-fire coal and natural gas. The installed capacity and electricity output is summarised in the table.

Hams Hall C electricity capacity and output
Year	1957	1958	1961	1962	1963	1967	1971	1979	1981	1982
Installed capacity, MW	112	280	390	390	390	390	390	390	390	390
Electricity output, GWh	223	1,334	2,344	2,334	2,255	1,972	2,592	1,392	366	793

Following privatisation in 1990, the station was operated by Powergen. The C station closed in 1992. Its two chimneys and three cooling towers were demolished on 15 December 1993, under darkness.

=== Proposed D station ===
In 1968 the site was considered for a fourth power station. The CEGB made routine investigations into the feasibility of a D station, but nothing was ever built.

=== Post closure ===
After closure and demolition of the power stations an industrial estate was constructed on the site. Alfred McAlpine were involved in the construction work of the new estate. The site is still owned by E.ON, the current form of PowerGen, and known as Hams Hall Distribution Park.

Hams Hall BESS, a utility scale battery owned by BW ESS and AIP Management, with 350 MW of power output and 1,243 MWh of storage capacity is under construction. A second phase is planned to increase this to 400 MW output and 1,424 MWh of storage capacity.

== See also ==
- Nechells power stations
