= Indian locomotive class XB =

Class XB
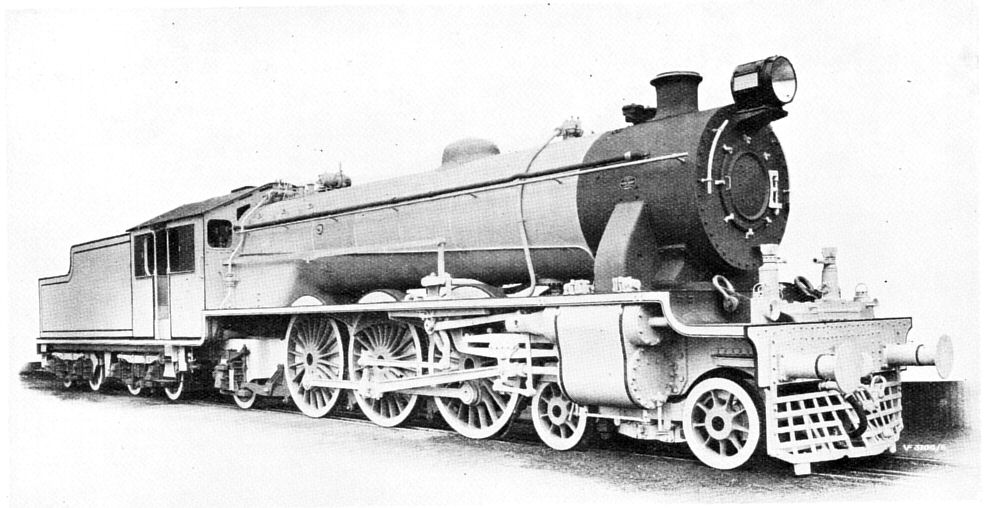
- Vulcan Foundry works photograph of an XB
Type and origin
- Power type: Steam
- Designer: M/s Rendel Palmer and Tritton
- Builder: Vulcan Foundry (83); Armstrong Whitworth (12); North British Locomotive Company (4)
- Build date: 1927–1936
- Total produced: 99
Specifications
- Configuration
  - Whyte: 4-6-2
  - UIC: 2′C1′ h2
- Gauge: 5 ft 6 in (1,676 mm)
- Leading dia.: 3 ft 0 in (0.914 m)
- Driver dia.: 6 ft 2 in (1.880 m)
- Trailing dia.: 3 ft 7 in (1.092 m)
- Wheelbase: 13 ft 2 in (4.013 m)
- Axle load: 17 long tons (17 t; 19 short tons)
- Loco weight: 90.2 long tons (91.6 t; 101.0 short tons)
- Tender weight: 49.4 long tons (50.2 t; 55.3 short tons)
- Fuel type: Coal
- Fuel capacity: 6-wheel: 10 long tons (10 t; 11 short tons); 8-wheel: 7.5 long tons (7.6 t; 8.4 short tons)
- Water cap.: 6-wheel: 4,000 imp gal (18,000 L; 4,800 US gal), 8-wheel: 4,500 imp gal (20,000 L; 5,400 US gal)
- Firebox
  - Grate area: 45 sq ft (4.2 m^{2})
- Boiler pressure: 180 psi (1.24 MPa)
- Heating surface
  - Firebox: 198 sq ft (18.4 m^{2})
  - Tubes and flues: 1,642 sq ft (152.5 m^{2})
- Superheater
  - Heating area: 463 sq ft (43.0 m^{2})
- Cylinders: Two, outside
- Cylinder size: 21.5 in × 28 in (546 mm × 711 mm)
- Valve gear: Walschaerts
Performance figures
- Maximum speed: 72 mph (116 km/h)
- Tractive effort: 26,760 lbf (119.03 kN)
- Factor of adh.: 4.33
Career
- Operators: Indian Railways
- Locale: EIR, M&SM and BB&CI
- Preserved: 1 (No.450)
- Scrapped: 1983
- Disposition: One preserved in Pakistan, remainder scrapped.

The Indian locomotive class XB was a 4-6-2 (or Pacific) passenger locomotive with a 17-long-ton (17 t; 19-short-ton) axle load. It was one of several standard designs drawn up in the early 1920s as part of the Indian Railway Standard (IRS) series. The class suffered many teething troubles early in their service career, and after several modifications were made, the XBs were in service until the 1980s.

== Background and design ==
In 1924, the Indian Railway Board formed the Locomotive Standards Committee in designing new locomotive designs, as a result of an increase in traffic following the First World War and the prospect of using low-grade coal, which previous locomotive designs may not work well with. Evolved from the BESA designs of the early 1900s, three 4-6-2 passenger locomotive classes and two freight 2-8-2 designs were drawn up.

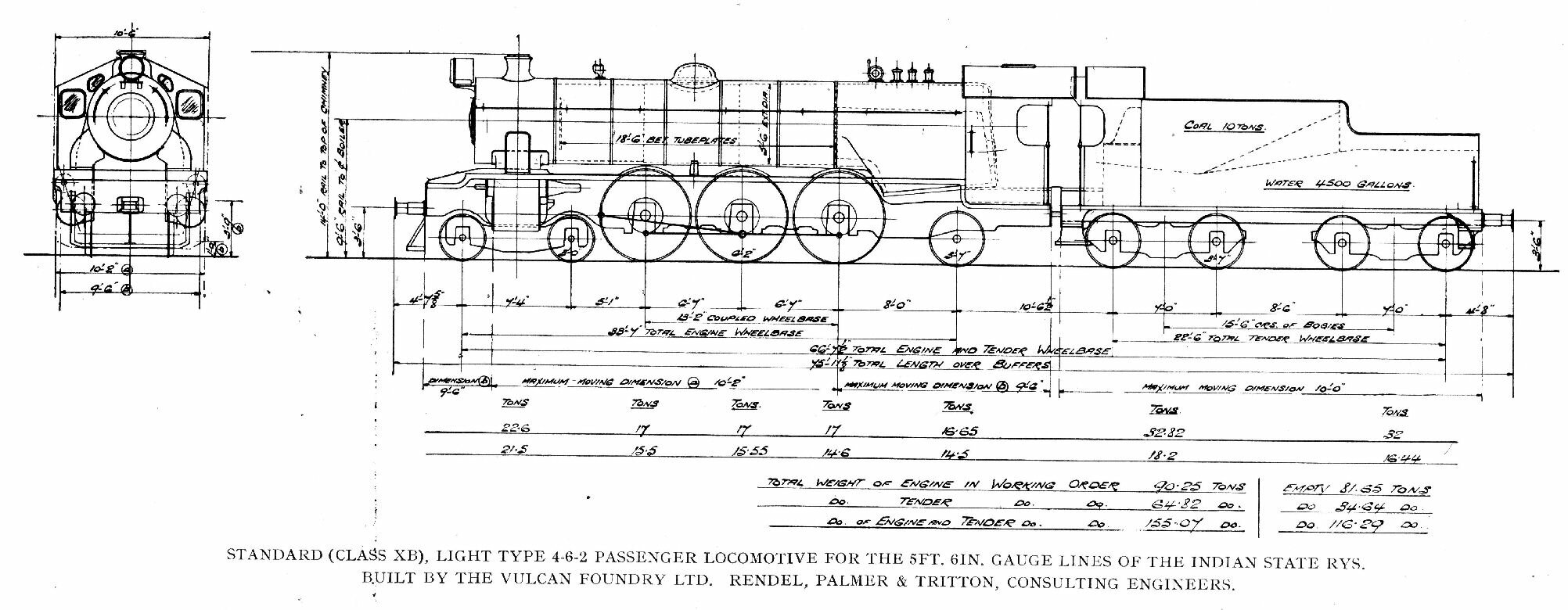
Class XB, Light Type 4-6-2 Passenger Locomotive Built By The Vulcan Foundry Ltd. for Indian State

The XB was one of these 4-6-2 designs, and like the other designs, was designed with consultation with many manufacturers and the British Engineering Standards Association (BESA) by the Indian Railway Board. It was comparable to contemporary designs in Britain, having American 3-point suspension with compensating levers for indifferent tracks in India. The trailing wheels were mounted on a Cartazzi truck, as it was for the rest of British Pacifics at the time. Goodall-type drawgear was fitted between engine and tender to facilitate free movement. The copper firebox had combustion chamber extension.

== Problems ==
Like the other X series Pacifics, the XB was prone to frame fractures. One unit had nine fractures in nine years. 18 XBs of the East Indian Railway Company (EIR) spent three years in repair shop, out of eight years. Again due to it being an X series Pacific, it had chronic coupling rod failure. Tubeplates had to be replaced frequently due to the radius of flanges being prone to cracking. The boiler was poor, having pressure below 150 pounds per square inch (1,000 kPa), and the diameter was too small for the flue gas made by the firebox. Tube cross-section area to the grate was only 9%. Testing showed that the engine was unable to haul a 350-long-ton (360 t) train at 60 mph (97 km/h) at 33% cylinder cut-off. It oscillated laterally at a right-angle to the tracks causing damage to the tracks. Within nine years, there were 68 such cases caused by the XB and XC class locomotives.

== Remediation attempts ==
The trailing bogie was moved 30 inches (760 mm) back and an American drawgear was fitted, while a 45 miles per hour (72 km/h) speed restriction was enforced on many lines. In 1937, the Bihta accident occurred with the engine jumping the tracks and derailing at 60 mph (97 km/h), killing over 100 people. The Pacific Locomotive Committee was formed on public demand, with representatives coming from Britain, France, and India.

Robert Leguille decided to fit the leading and trailing bogies with stiffer side springs and better damping. He was proven right with experiments. The Bombay, Baroda and Central India Railway and Madras and Southern Mahratta Railway followed his advice and EIR restricted the engines to slow-speed trains. The modifications in India to this class were implemented by London, Midland and Scottish Railway in Britain.

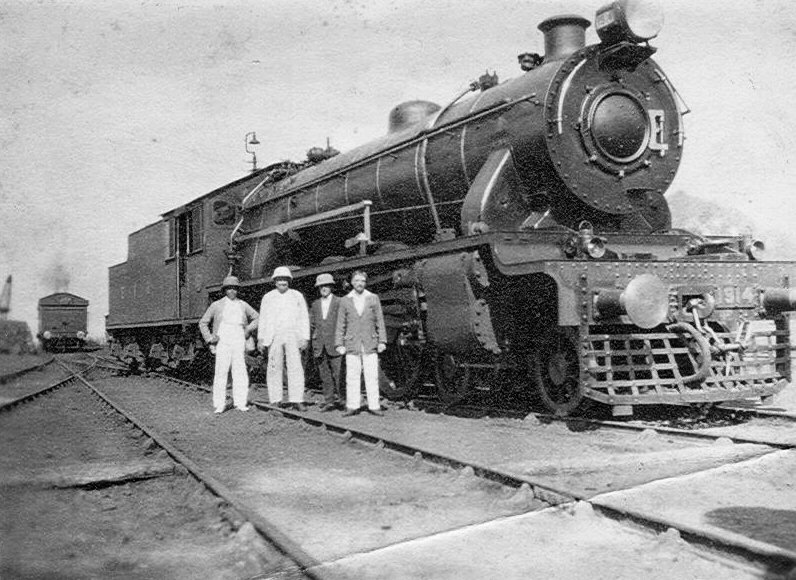
East Indian Rail Company Class XB Locomotive built by The Vulcan Foundry Ltd.

Technical specifications
Length between tube plates	18 ft 6 in (5.64 m)
95 small tubes diameter	2.25 in (57.15 mm)
22 smoke tubes diameter	5.5 in (139.7 mm)
4 arch tubes	3 in (76.2 mm)
22 smoke tubes diameter	5.5 in (139.7 mm)
Superheater	22 elements

== Preservation ==
No XB's from Indian Railways have survived into preservation, but in Pakistan, No.450, an ex-EBR locomotive, survived and is preserved at Lahore workshops.

== Trains hauled by XB ==
- West Coast Express
- Darjeeling Mail

== See also ==
- Rail transport in India § History
- Indian Railways
- Locomotives of India
- Rail transport in India
