= Indian locomotive class SP =

Indian steam locomotive class

BESA class SP
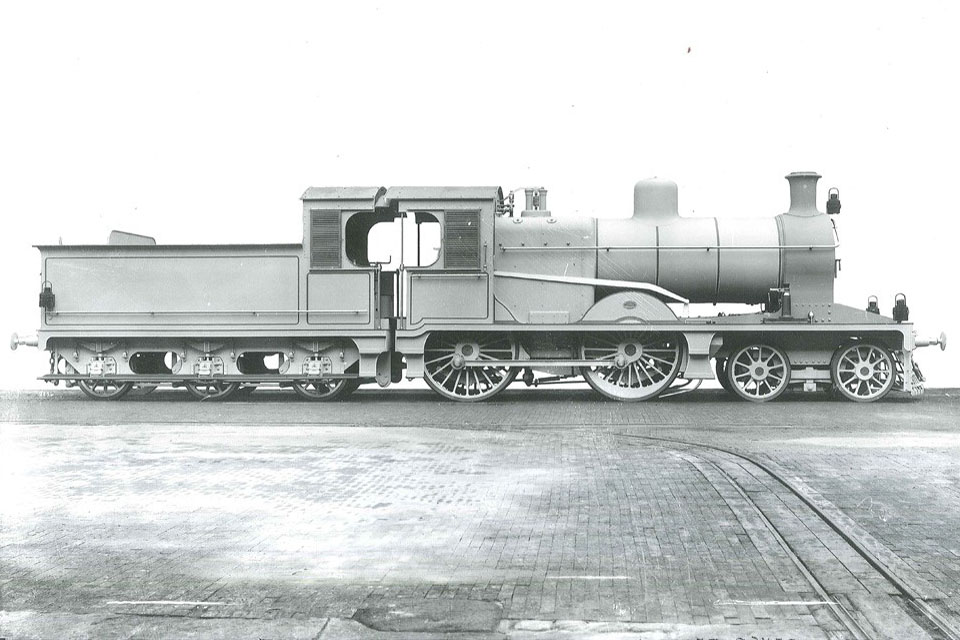
- Builder's photo of an SP class.
Type and origin
- Power type: Steam
- Designer: British Engineering Standards Association (BESA)
- Builder: Vulcan Foundry; North British Locomotive Company; Robert Stephenson & Hawthorns
- Build date: SP: 1904
- Total produced: SP: 10
Specifications
- Configuration
  - Whyte: 4-4-0
- Gauge: 5 ft 6 in (1,676 mm)
- Driver dia.: 6 ft 2 in (1.880 m)
- Wheelbase: 6 ft 0 in (1.829 m) +; 7 ft 5 in (2.261 m) +; 9 ft 5 in (2.870 m)
- Axle load: 16.25 long tons (16.51 t; 18.20 short tons)
- Loco weight: 51.00 long tons (51.82 t; 57.12 short tons)
- Tender weight: 39.50 long tons (40.13 t; 44.24 short tons)
- Fuel type: Coal
- Fuel capacity: 7.5 long tons (7.6 t; 8.4 short tons)
- Water cap.: 3,000 imp gal (14,000 L; 3,600 US gal)
- Firebox
  - Grate area: 25.3 sq ft (2.35 m^{2})
- Boiler
  - Diameter: Outside: 4 ft 8 1/2 in (1,435 mm)
  - Tube plates: 11 ft 4 1/4 in (3.46 m)
  - Small tubes: 1 3/4 in (44 mm) × 236 off
- Boiler pressure: 180 lbf/in^{2} (1.24 MPa)
- Heating surface
  - Firebox: 120 sq ft (11 m^{2})
  - Tubes: 1,229.5 sq ft (114.22 m^{2})
- Cylinders: 2 inside
- Cylinder size: 18 1/2 in × 26 in (470 mm × 660 mm)
- Valve gear: Stephenson valve gear
- Valve type: Slide valve
Performance figures
- Tractive effort: 11.2 bar boiler pressure: 87 kN; 9.3 bar boiler pressure: 72 kN
Career
- Operators: Indian Railways, Eastern Bengal Railway, East Indian Railway Company; Oudh and Rohilkhand Railway
- Locale: Eastern Railway zone and Northern Railway zone
- Disposition: 2 preserved

The Indian locomotive class SP (Standard Passenger) were a class of 4-4-0 passenger broad-gauge locomotives introduced around 1905 (Note: The Engineering Standards Committee report that first catalogued this locomotive design was compiled in 1903, but was not published until 1905 (British Standards Institution).) that were one of seven standard locomotive designs developed by the Engineering Standards Committee (later the British Engineering Standards Association (BESA)) for the broad-gauge railways of British India.

== Background ==
British Indian railways operated numerous steam locomotives built to their own design standards, and near and at the turn of the century, this created a considerable strain on British locomotive manufacturers who could not keep up with demand. This led to British Indian railways outsourcing production of locomotives to non-British companies, which generated complaints from British locomotive manufacturers.

Amidst this situation, proposals for standardisation of British Indian steam locomotives were made as early as the 1870s, in which there were prior plans to standardise locomotive designs for British Indian railways that never went through; but later, a locomotive standardisation scheme for British Indian railways was finally realised when the Engineering Standards Committee was requested by the British Indian government to develop standard locomotive classes for British Indian railways. Its first report, compiled in 1903, outlined plans for British Indian standard locomotives, being revised in 1907 and in 1910.

== History ==
The SP class locomotives were catalogued in the first report (1903) of the Engineering Standards Committee on standard locomotives for the railways of the British Raj. 4-4-0 (American) locomotives were preferred in India as they had good riding qualities, even on poor track conditions. Later on, in the third report (1910) of the Engineering Standards Committee of the same, a variant with a larger boiler was outlined, which had a diameter of 5 feet 1 1/4 inches (1,556 mm), as used in the PT (Passenger Tank) class locomotives.

Engines built to this design worked the broad-gauge lines of British Indian railways; however, only government-operated railways designated these locomotives as the SP class. Beyer, Peacock & Company delivered 10 locomotives to the North Western Railway (NWR), which became the Pakistan Western Railway and the Eastern Punjab Railway upon the partition of India.

== Design ==
The design parameters outlined by the Engineering Standards Committee were as follows: the locomotives were designed to use the same boiler as the SG (Standard Goods) class locomotives, which had a diameter of 4 feet 8 1/4 inches (1,429 mm), and later the same boiler as the PT class locomotives—the latter two locomotives built to broad gauge, two inside cylinders, a Belpaire firebox, and saturated steam. The valve gear used was the Stephenson valve gear which was fitted inside the frames. The grate was fitted between the two driving wheels. The diameter of the driving wheels necessitated splashers to be fitted over the wheels. A small pilot was fitted to the locomotive's buffer beam. The cab was enclosed, with the cab's rear wall being formed by the tender's half cab.

A later version was designed with a superheater and designated SPS (Standard Passenger, Superheated); SP locomotives retrofitted with superheaters were usually reclassified as SPC (Standard Passenger, Converted).

== Preservation ==
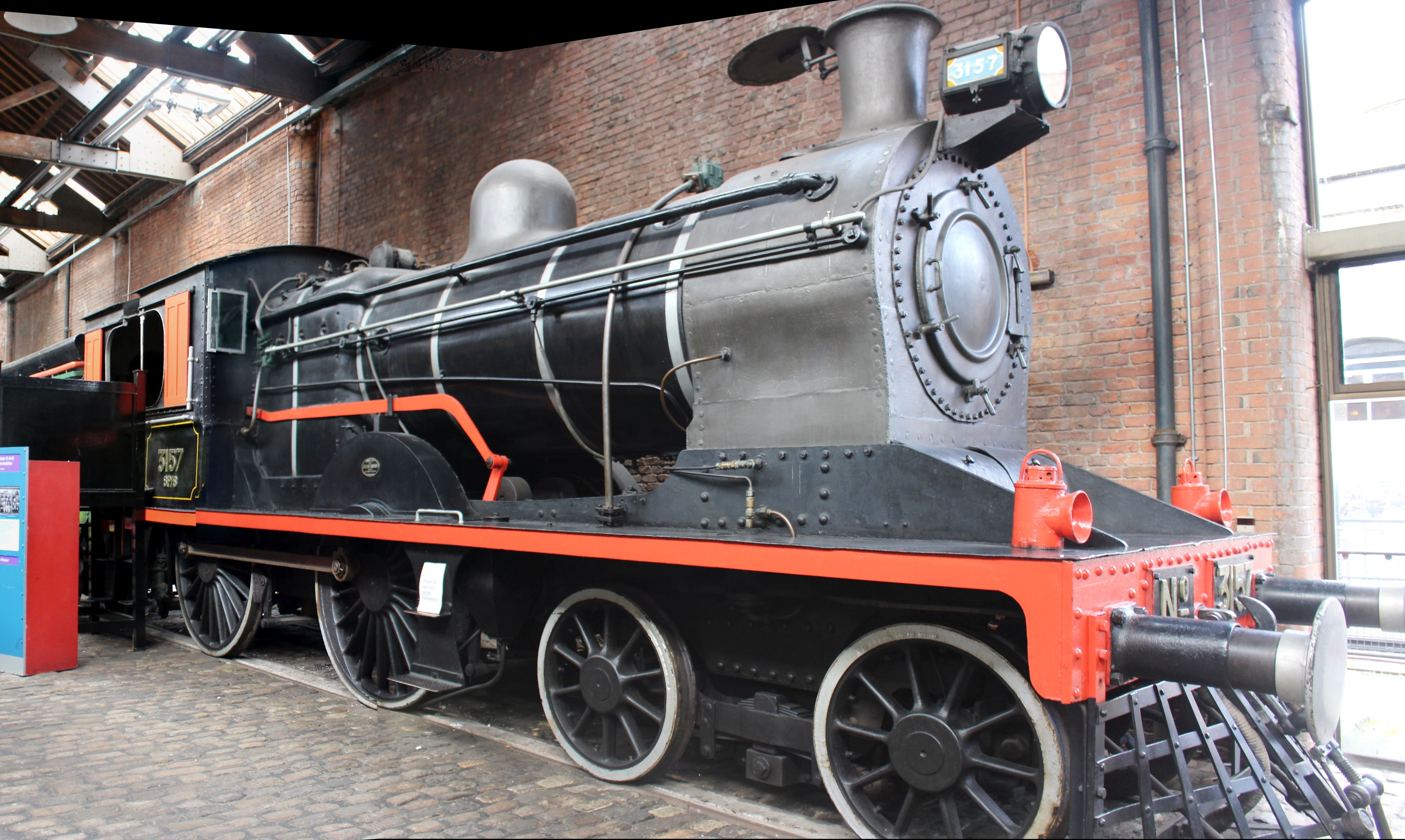
Pakistan Railway SPS 3157 preserved in the Science & Industry Museum, Manchester

Two SPS locomotives, operated by Pakistan Railways until the late 20th century, are preserved. SPS 3157 is preserved in the Science & Industry Museum in Manchester, having been repatriated in 1982 after being withdrawn a year prior. The other example, SPS 3078, is on display at Faisalabad Railway Station in Pakistan.
