= Indian locomotive class SG =

SG
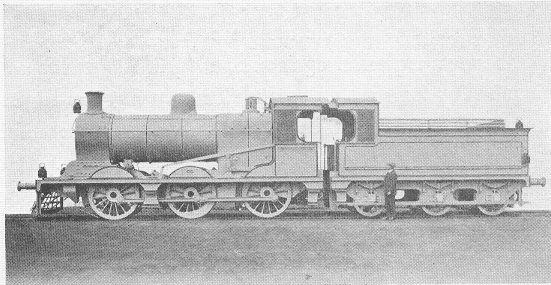
Type and origin
- Power type: Steam
- Designer: British Engineering Standards Association (BESA)
- Builder: Vulcan Foundry, North British Locomotive Company and Robert Stephenson and Hawthorns
- Build date: SG: 1905-13; SGC3: After 1927
- Total produced: SG: 486; SG1: 66; SGS: 362
- Rebuild date: After 1927
Specifications
- Configuration
  - Whyte: 0-6-0
- Gauge: 5 ft 6 in (1,676 mm)
- Coupled dia.: 61.5 in (1.562 m)
- Wheelbase: 15 ft 3 in (4.65 m)
- Axle load: 16 long tons (16 t; 18 short tons)
- Loco weight: 48 long tons (49 t; 54 short tons)
- Tender weight: 39.25 long tons (39.88 t; 43.96 short tons)
- Fuel type: Coal
- Fuel capacity: 7.5 long tons (7.6 t; 8.4 short tons)
- Water cap.: 3,000 imp gal (14,000 L; 3,600 US gal)
- Firebox
  - Grate area: 25.3 sq ft (2.35 m^{2})
- Boiler: 54 in × 11 in (1,372 mm × 279 mm)
- Boiler pressure: 180 psi (1.24 MPa)
- Heating surface
  - Firebox: 120 sq ft (11 m^{2})
  - Tubes: 1,229.5 sq ft (114.22 m^{2})
- Cylinders: Two, inside
- Cylinder size: 18.5 in × 26 in (470 mm × 660 mm)
- Valve gear: Rotary Lentz valve gear
- Valve type: Slide valve
Performance figures
- Maximum speed: Freight: 18 mph (29 km/h); Troop trains: 30 mph (48 km/h)
Career
- Operators: Indian Railways, Eastern Bengal Railway, EIR and Oudh and Rohilkhand Railway
- Locale: Eastern Railway zone and Northern Railway zone
- Preserved: At least one SGC-2 in Bangladesh and one SGS in Pakistan

The Indian locomotive class SG is a class of Indian steam locomotives used for goods trains. Its class designation, SG, stands for Standard Goods. It was, by number of locomotives built, one of the largest steam locomotive classes built in the United Kingdom. It was one of the BESA locomotives developed by the British Engineering Standards Committee, later called the British Engineering Standards Association (BESA).

== History ==
With the growing demand for locomotives in the British Raj, it became increasingly difficult for British locomotive manufacturers to fulfill that need. To alleviate that problem, the British Engineering Standards Association (BESA) was commissioned to develop standard locomotive types. The first BESA report issued in 1903 recommended designs for a 4-4-0 standard passenger locomotive classified as SP and one for an 0-6-0 standard goods locomotive classified as SG. Later, revised editions of the BESA reports proposed eight classes of broad gauge locomotives and four classes of meter gauge locomotives for various services; these locomotives were later called BESA locomotives.

The SG class was used by the North Western State Railway (NWR), the Eastern Bengal Railway (EBR), the East Indian Railway (EIR) and the Oudh and Rohilkhand Railway (ORR) in India, hauling both goods and passenger trains. They could haul 1450 tons of freight with a speed of 18 mph (29 km/h). Some locomotives were in service in India until the early 1980s and in Pakistan until the 1990s.

== Design variants ==
A later variant designed with a Schmidt superheater was classified SGS (Standard Goods, Superheated). These locomotives received larger cylinders with piston valves and larger boilers, as well as a four-axle tender with bogies, as compared to their earlier designs which used saturated steam. One SGS train was in service on the Khyber Pass Railway route from Peshawar city to Landi Kotal prior to the suspension of service in 2006.

SG class locomotives retrofitted with superheaters were classified as SGC (Standard Goods, Converted). The SGSC class, later called SGC2, had round fireboxes instead of the Belpaire firebox of the original design. SGC3 class locomotives were retrofitted with superheaters and were fitted with the Lentz rotary valve gear. Despite their classifications, they frequently hauled passenger and mail trains.

A design variant classified as SG1 existed with unknown design characteristics.

Subclasses
Designation	Number	Year of construction (Rebuilding)	Comments	Divisions
SG	486	1905–1913	Original design, Belpaire fireboxes, saturated steam	NWR EBR
SG1	66		Unknown design characteristics	
SGC, SGC1		(around 1927)	SGs retrofitted with superheaters	NWR
SGS	362		SGs delivered with superheaters	NWR
SGSC, SGC2			Round firebox, superheated	
SGC3			Superheated, Lentz valve gear	EIR

== Preservation ==
As of 2024, two examples are known to survive into preservation, those being SGS 2473 and SGC-2 240.

SGS 2473 was originally used by North Western Railway, before it was taken to Pakistan Railways. Withdrawn sometime in 1996, it saw mainline tour use until finally being taken out of use in 2010. It was then stored at Pakistan Railways’ workshops in Lahore. It is now at the Asfand Yar Bukhari Shaheed park on display.

SGC-2 240 was originally used on the Eastern Bengal Railway from 1921 until 1936, by which it had been converted to burn oil. The locomotive would later be used as a shunter at Saidpur until 1983. It is now a plinth at Saidpur Railway Workshops.

Working	Class	Number	Location	Built	Zone	Builders	Build No	Name	Last ran
No	SGC-2	240	Saidpur Works, Bangladesh	1921	BW	Vulcan Foundry	Unknown		1983
No	SGS	2473	Asfand Yar Bukhari Shaheed park, Pakistan	1920		Vulcan Foundry	3361		2010

== See also ==
- Indian Railways
- Rail transport in India § History
- Locomotives of India
- Rail transport in India
