= Indian locomotive class YP =

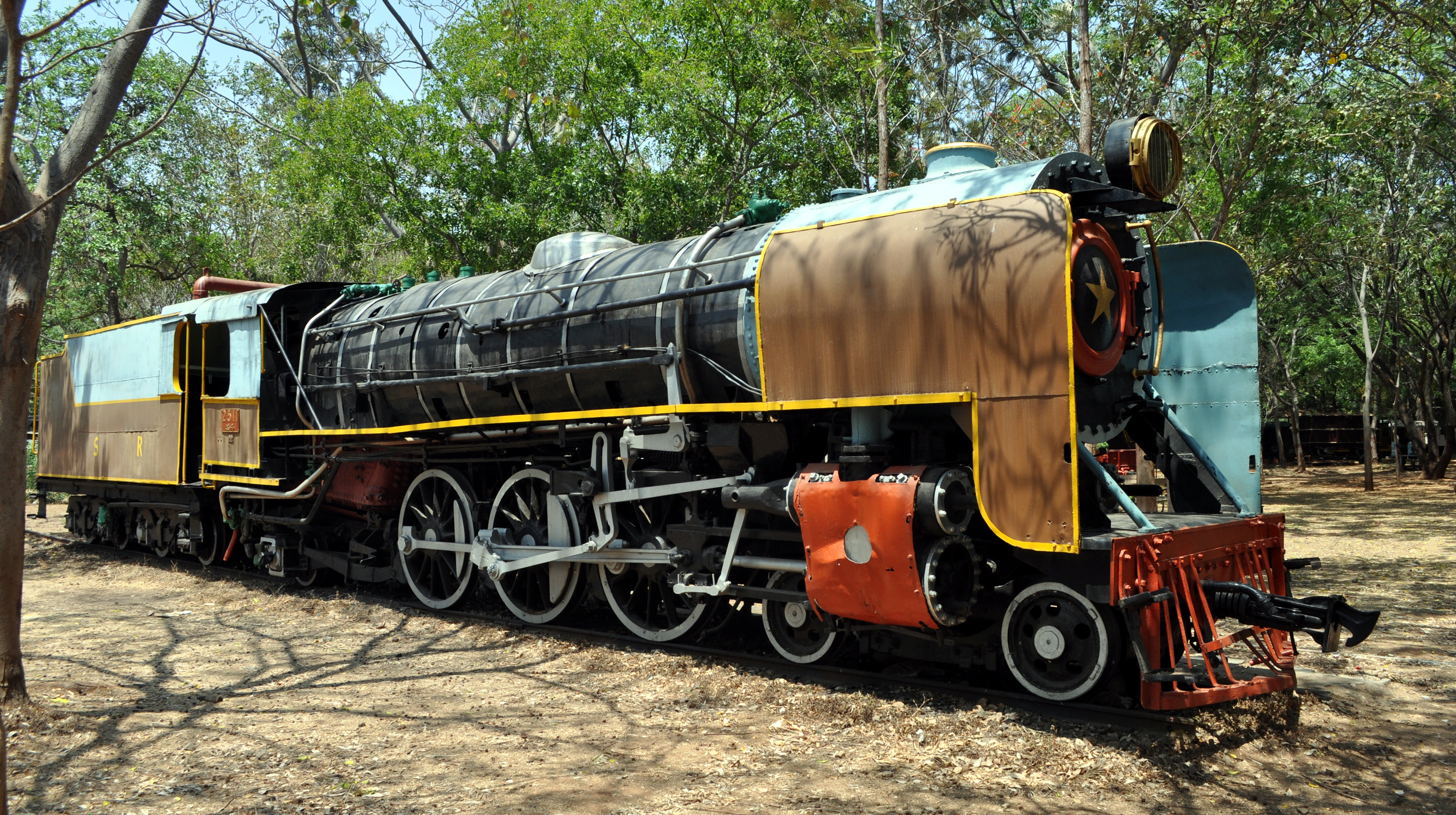
- No. 2511 on display at the Railway Museum, Mysore.
Type and origin
- Power type: Steam
- Builder: Baldwin Locomotive Works; North British Locomotive Company; Krauss-Maffei; Tata Engineering and Locomotive Co.
- Build date: 1949–1970
- Total produced: 871
Specifications
- Configuration
  - Whyte: 4-6-2
  - UIC: 2'C1'
- Gauge: 1,000 mm (3 ft 3 3/8 in)
- Coupled dia.: 1,372 mm (4 ft 6.0 in)
- Wheelbase
  - incl. tender: 16,333 mm (53 ft 7.0 in)
- Length
  - Over buffers: 19,088 mm (62 ft 7.5 in)
- Width: 2,590 mm (8 ft 6 in)
- Height: 3,430 mm (11 ft 3 in)
- Axle load: 10.5 t (10.3 long tons; 11.6 short tons)
- Service weight: 99 t (97 long tons; 109 short tons)
- Fuel type: Coal
- Fuel capacity: 9.8 t (9.6 long tons; 10.8 short tons)
- Water cap.: 3,000 US gal (11,000 L; 2,500 imp gal)
- Firebox
  - Grate area: 2.6 m^{2} (28 sq ft)
- Boiler pressure: 14.4 bar (209 psi)
- Heating surface
  - Tubes and flues: 134 m^{2} (1,440 sq ft)
  - Total surface: 103.35 m^{2} (1,112.5 sq ft)
- Superheater
  - Heating area: 30.75 m^{2} (331.0 sq ft)
- Cylinders: Two, outside
- Cylinder size: 609 mm (24.0 in)
- Valve gear: Walschaerts
Performance figures
- Tractive effort
  - Starting: 82 kN (18,000 lbf)
Career
- Operators: Indian Railways
- Numbers: See table
- References (unless where noted)

The Indian locomotive class YP are a class of 4-6-2 passenger locomotives built for Indian Railways' metre gauge network as one of several post-partition standard designs evolved from the pre-war Indian Railway Standard designs.

== History ==
The YP locomotives were intended to replace the earlier YB and YC class locomotives of the original IRS series designs. A total of 871 locomotives were built between 1949 and 1970 by various manufacturers. They were among the most commonly used steam locomotives in the country and one of the last built specifically for passenger service in the world. Baldwin Locomotive Works delivered the first batch of 20 locomotives in 1949, followed by another 100 from the North British Locomotive Company, with Krauss-Maffei supplying a further 200 locomotives between 1952 and 1954. The remaining 551 were domestically built by Tata Engineering and Locomotive Co. between 1954 and 1970.

Until the 1990s, YP class were in service on India's metre-gauge network in large numbers, especially, in the states of Rajasthan, Assam and Tamil Nadu.

Several examples have been preserved and are now on display in various locations in India. Numbers 2257 and 2684 were sold in 1990 to American-owned Railroad Development Corporation and were seen in Togo as of 2007.

== Table of builders and numbers ==
Year	Quantity	Builder	Serial number	Running number
1949	20	Baldwin Locomotive Works	74454–74473	2000–2870 (not in order)
1952	100	North British Locomotive Company	27120–27219	2000–2870 (not in order)
1952–1954	200	Krauss-Maffei	17732–17781, 17991–18140	2000–2870 (not in order)
1954–1970	551	Tata Engineering and Locomotive Co.	51–150, 201–290, 761–830, 845–935, 956–1155	2000–2870 (not in order)

== Design ==
As the replacement for the original IRS design YB class, which had less efficient steaming from the coal which they were fired on with the lower grate area of the class, and for the YC class, which were barred from working lighter lines due to their heavy axle load, the superheating and upgraded valve gear of the YPs made them more powerful than the YBs and YCs.

The YPs were greatly standardised between the YG class locomotives, which were their goods counterparts. Many parts of both classes were shared with each other. Moreover, both locomotives shared the designs of parts from their broad-gauge counterparts, the WG class and the WP class, scaled down from their broad gauge versions, allowing common maintenance procedures.

Since the locomotives were intended for use on routes with relatively low axle loads, they had to be as light as possible. For this reason, the side panels and cab were made of aluminum as a weight-saving measure.

== Allocation ==
The YP class locomotives were used all over India. By the end of 1976, the locomotives were allocated to the following regional zones of Indian Railways:

Zone	Quantity
Central Railways	9
Northern Railways	101
North Eastern Railways	235
Northern Frontier Railway	98
Western Railways	155
South Central Railways	72
Southern Railways	199

Two locomotives of this class had been withdrawn at the time.
