= BNR class N =

Class of steam locomotive used in India

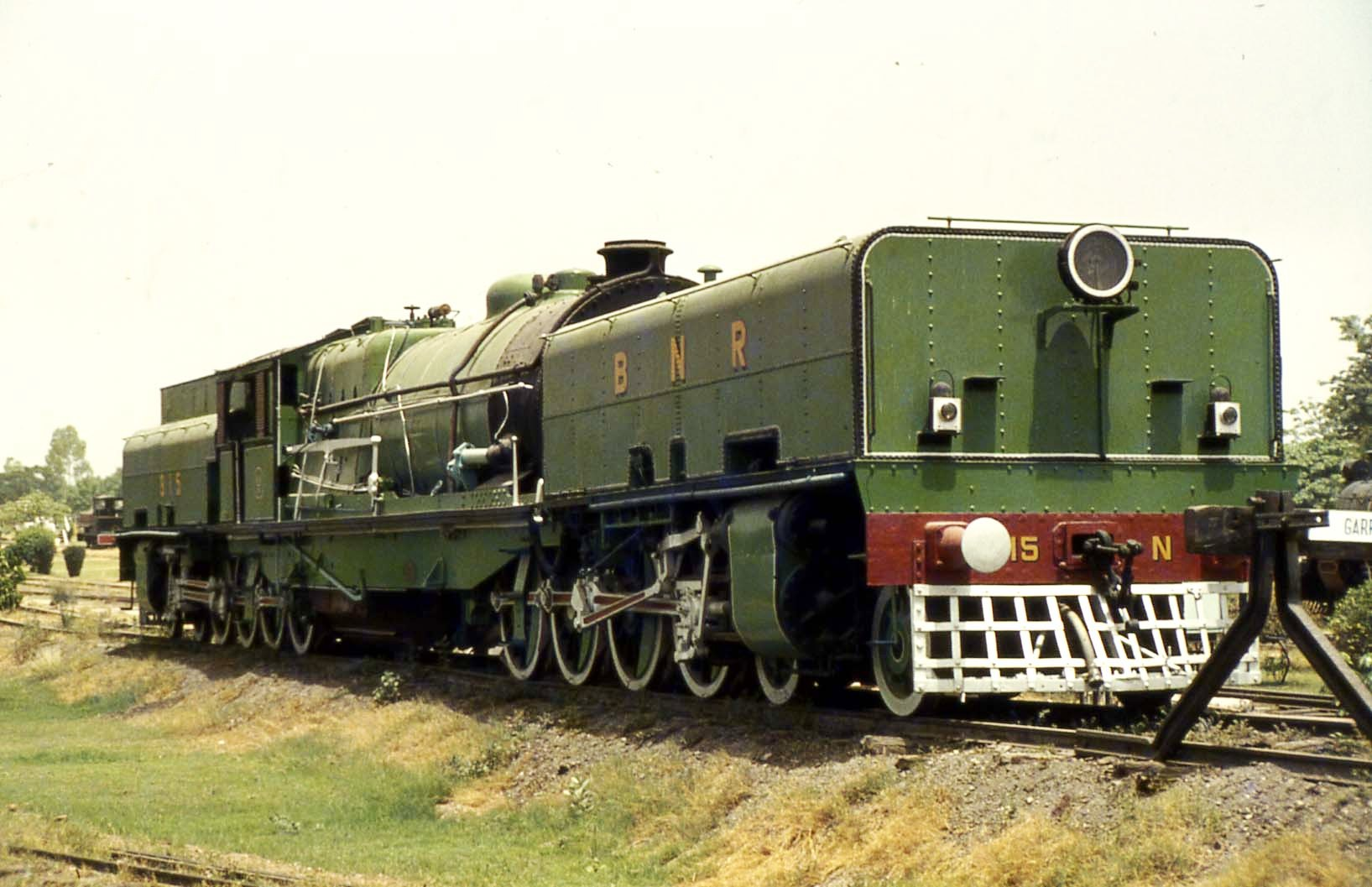
- Preserved class member 815 (BP 6594/1930) at the National Rail Museum, New Delhi
Type and origin
- Power type: Steam
- Builder: Beyer, Peacock & Company
- Serial number: 6583–6598
- Build date: 1929
- Total produced: 16
Specifications
- Configuration
  - Whyte: 4-8-0+0-8-4
  - UIC: (2′D)(D2′) h4t
- Gauge: 5 ft 6 in (1,676 mm)
- Driver dia.: 4 ft 8 in (1.422 m)
- Axle load: 20.25 long tons (20.57 t; 22.68 short tons)
- Adhesive weight: 159.4 long tons (162.0 t; 178.5 short tons)
- Loco weight: 234 long tons (237.8 t; 262.1 short tons)
- Fuel type: Coal
- Fuel capacity: 14 long tons (14.2 t; 15.7 short tons)
- Water cap.: 10,000 imp gal (45,000 L; 12,000 US gal)
- Firebox
  - Grate area: 69.8 sq ft (6.48 m^{2})
- Boiler pressure: 210 psi (1.45 MPa)
- Superheater
  - Heating area: 642 sq ft (59.6 m^{2})
- Cylinders: Four, outside
- Cylinder size: 20 1/2 in × 26 in (521 mm × 660 mm)
- Valve gear: Walschaerts
- Valve type: Piston valves
Performance figures
- Maximum speed: 45 mph (72 km/h)
- Tractive effort: 69,655 lbf (309.84 kN)
- Factor of adh.: 4.56
Career
- Operators: Bengal Nagpur Railway; →Indian Railways
- Numbers: BNR: 810–825; →IR: 38810–38825
- Locale: South Eastern Railway zone
- First run: 1929
- Last run: 1970
- Retired: 1970
- Withdrawn: 1970
- Preserved: No. 811 and 815
- Current owner: National Rail Museum, New Delhi and Kharagpur Workshops

The Bengal Nagpur Railway class N was a class of 4-8-0+0-8-4 Garratt steam locomotives built by Beyer, Peacock & Company in England in 1929. At the time of their construction, they had the largest water capacity of any Garratt, in addition to being the largest locomotives in India. The class N Garratts were introduced following successful performance results from the earlier HSG Garratts. Due to their heavy weight, they were restricted to 90 lb/yd (45 kg/m) rails. They had straight-ported cylinders; it is not known if this was suitable for slow, heavy coal traffic. Like the earlier HSG Garratts, they worked on the Chakradharpur-Jharsuguda and the Anara-Tatanagar sections. After electrification, they were used at Rourkela. They could haul 2,400 t (2,362 long tons; 2,646 short tons) on a 1 in 100 gradient.

== History ==
The locomotives were imported by the BNR following the success of the earlier HSG Garratts. A total of 16 locomotives were built by Beyer, Peacock and Company Limited between 1929 and 1930. On the BNR and later Indian Railways, they were classified as the N class. Due their high hauling capacity and tractive effort, they were used to haul heavy freight trains weighing up to 3000-4000 metric tons on the BNR and later on the Southeastern Railway (SER) until withdrawal. After the restructuring of the railways in the 1950s, the locomotives were transferred to the Southern eastern railway zone, and were renumbered into the 38xxx series under the All-India renumbering plan. They are the heaviest locomotives which operated in India with a weight of 234 metric tons. With their increasing age and with dieselification and electrification of the railway, they were relegated to haul smaller passenger and freight trains. Also they became outdated after the introduction of newer steam locomotives such as the Indian locomotive class WG and Indian locomotive class WP. They also became less economical due to their large coal need. By 1970, most of them had been withdrawn from service and used for shunting and the units were slowly scrapped. They were withdrawn in the 1970s. Two units out of the 16 built, survive: 811 and 815. 815 is housed at the National Railway Museum of New Delhi.

In 2006, Garratt 811 of Kharagpur workshop was returned to working order and used on a few runs before being stored again. Many parts were borrowed from class member 815 at the National Rail Museum of India in order to achieve this. The parts were later returned and refitted to 815, which was given a cosmetic overhaul. In 2018 a second attempt to return 811 to working order was made; this time all missing parts were fabricated in a US$400,000 refurbishment that was put out to public tender. The locomotive had one test run in late 2019, and has not ran as of 2025.

== Design ==
Boiler diameter	7 ft 1 13/16 in (2.18 m)
Boiler area	3,112 sq ft (289.1 m^{2})
Max train load	3,000 long tons (3,048.1 t; 3,360.0 short tons)

The locomotives had two tenders, one leading, which carried water and the rear one carried water and coal for the locomotive. The water from these tenders was pumped to the central boiler and operated on steam. If the water level in the leading tender went down, the tractive effort of the engine decreased. It was rated at around 309 kilonewtons. The two tenders were connected to the central boiler via pivot joints which helped the locomotives negotiate curves. The locomotives were powered by two bogies powered by two piston cylinders each, one on each side of the bogie. The locomotives could operate in both directions. The top speed of the locomotives was around 72 kmph. The locomotives were equipped with vacuum brakes for the locomotive as well as the train.

== See also ==
- Indian Railways
- Rail transport in India § History
- Locomotives of India
- Rail transport in India
