= Indian locomotive class YG =

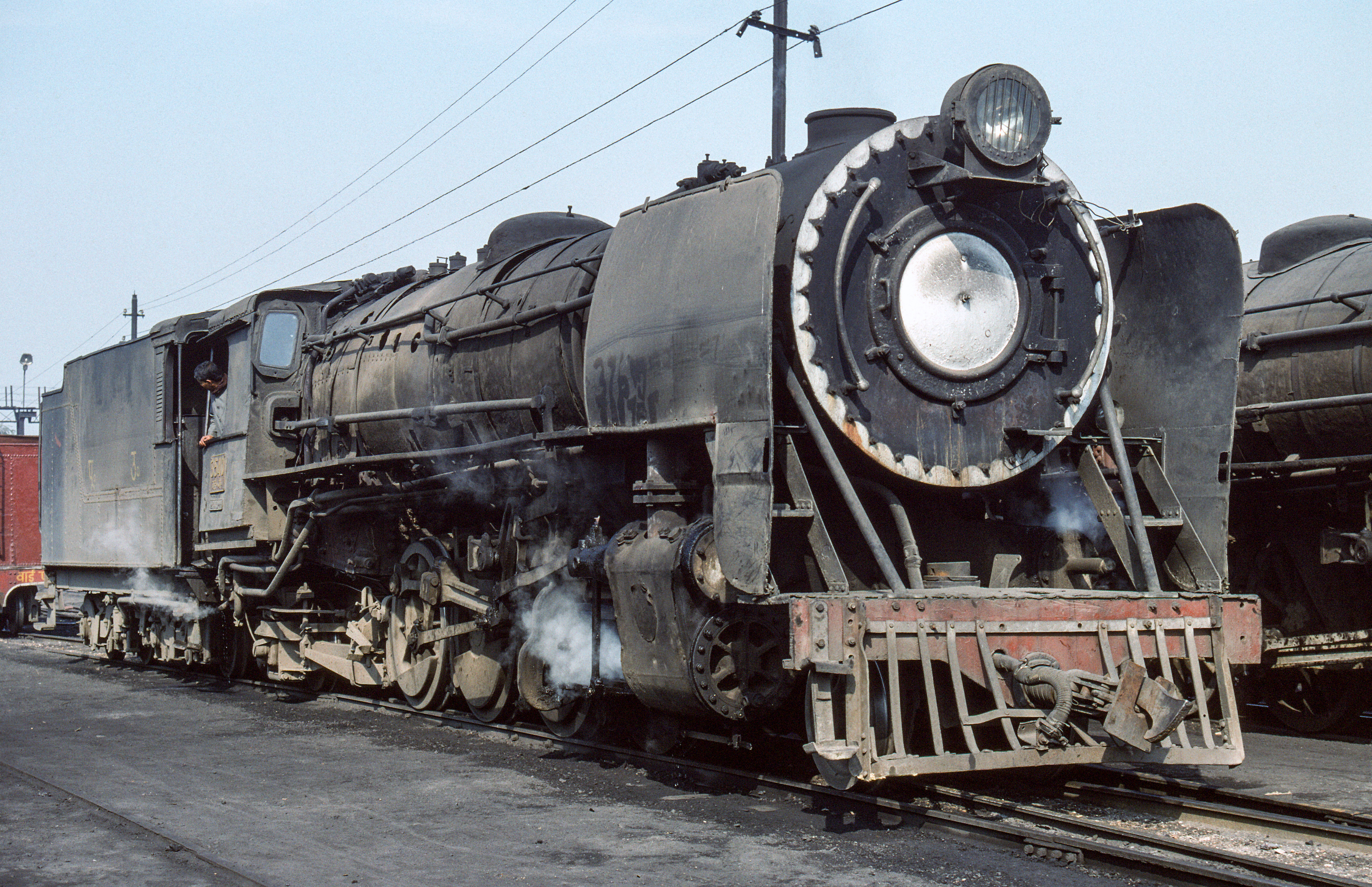
- YG 3543 at Bareilly City sheds
Type and origin
- Power type: Steam
- Builder: Baldwin Locomotive Works; Canadian Locomotive Company; Chittaranjan Locomotive Works; Skoda Works; Mitsubishi Heavy Industries; Montreal Locomotive Works; Nippon Sharyo; Tata Motors; Lokomotivfabrik Floridsdorf
- Build date: 1949–1972
- Total produced: 1074
Specifications
- Configuration
  - Whyte: 2-8-2
- Gauge: 1,000 mm (3 ft 3 3/8 in)
- Coupled dia.: 1,219 mm (4 ft 0 in)
- Wheelbase: 16,333 mm (53 ft 7.0 in)
  - Engine: 9,068 mm (29 ft 9.0 in)
  - Coupled: 4,038 mm (13 ft 3.0 in)
- Length
  - Over buffers: 19,088 mm (62 ft 7.5 in)
- Height: 3,404 mm (11 ft 2.0 in)
- Axle load: 10.5 t (10.3 long tons; 11.6 short tons)
- Service weight: 58 t (57 long tons; 64 short tons)
- Firebox
  - Grate area: 2.6 m^{2} (28 sq ft)
- Boiler pressure: 14.5 bar (210 psi)
- Heating surface: 103.1 m^{2} (1,110 sq ft)
- Superheater
  - Heating area: 30.6 m^{2} (329 sq ft)
- Cylinders: Two, outside
- Cylinder size: 413 mm × 610 mm (16.3 in × 24.0 in)
- Valve gear: Walschaerts
Performance figures
- Maximum speed: 65 km/h (40 mph)
- Tractive effort
  - Starting: 104.8 kN (23,600 lbf)
Career
- Operators: Indian Railways
- Numbers: See table

The Indian locomotive class YG were a class of 2-8-2 metre-gauge goods locomotives introduced by Indian Railways around 1949. It was one of several standardised locomotive designs developed as further additions to the Indian Railway Standard (IRS) design locomotives built for the metre-gauge railways of India.

== History ==
The YG class was the most mass-produced metre-gauge freight locomotive in India after the partition of India. Between 1949 and 1972, a total of 1,074 locomotives were built by nine different manufacturers.

Although designed as goods engines, the YG was often used on passenger trains. It replaced the 1927-built YD class.

YG 3573, completed on 5 February 1972 by Chittaranjan Locomotive Works, was the last steam locomotive built in India.

Many of the locomotives were in use until the end of the 1990s. The last three examples, 3318, 3334 and 3360 were in regular service with Western Railways in 1999, being used on freight and passenger trains from Wankaner to Navlakhi via Morbi on the Gulf of Kutch.

Builder	Built date	Number	Serial number	Running number
Baldwin Locomotive Works	1949/50	120	74474–74592	3000–3149
Montreal Locomotive Works	1950	20	77606–77625	3000–3149
Canadian Locomotive Company	1950	10	2624–2633	3000–3149
Tata Engineering and Locomotive Co. (TELCO)	1952/53	50	1–50	3150–3199
Nippon Sharyo	1954/55	75	1619–1693	4001–4075
Wiener Lokomotivfabrik Floridsdorf	1956	50	17776–17825	4076–4125
Lenin Works (Škoda)	1956	50	3434–3483	4126–4175
Nippon Sharyo	1956	46	1706–1751	4276–4321
Mitsubishi Heavy Industries	1956	39	880–918	4322–4360
TELCO	1956–66	554	151–200, 291–760, 831–844, 936–955	3200–3513, 3690–3749, 4176–4275, 4361–4440 Not in order
Chittaranjan Locomotive Works (CLW)	1969–72	60	N/A	3514–3573

== Design ==
The YG class was designed as a metre-gauge variant of the broad-gauge class WG, but externally, they were broadly similar to the class YP passenger locomotives. The biggest difference between YG class and the preceding YD class was the use of bar frames, which were lighter and easier to manufacture than the plate frames.

In addition, the YGs had the latest technical features in a steam locomotive of its era, such as steel fire grates, rapidly heating boiler tubes, combustion chambers and large-area superheaters. Improved boiler conditions allowed the combustion of low-grade Indian coal with high ash content.

== Allocations ==
The YG class was widely used throughout India. By 1976, 1,059 locomotives were still rostered on the following zones of Indian Railways:

Region	Number
Central Railways	24
Northern Railways	165
North Eastern Railways	293
Northern Frontier Railway	106
Southern Railways	159
South Central Railways	151
Western Railways	161

== East African exports ==
In 1976, five locomotives, numbers 3563, 3564, 3551, 3550, and 3549, were sold to East African Railways. These were manufactured in 1971 and 1972, and were overhauled in India beforehand. Differences include the absence of smoke deflectors and some other minor adjustments. The five locomotives were placed in the 2701-2705 numbering sequence, being designated as Class 27^{II}, and were passed on to Tanzania Railways after the breakup of the EAR, before being withdrawn and scrapped in 1993.

== Preservation ==
At least 50 locomotives have been preserved. In 2000, two more examples were sold to private individuals in the United States, although their subsequent fate is unknown.

Number	Location	Status
3011	Saharsa	Inactive
3040	Tinsukia	Inactive
3042	Thana Bihpur	Inactive
3174	Tinsukia	Inactive
3212	Dibrugarh	Inactive
3213	Mariani	Static display
3218	Dibrugarh	Operational
3261	Ambala	Static display
3318	Lucknow	Static display
3334	Lucknow	Static display
3358	Salem	Static display
3360	Dwarka	Static display
3382	Koch Bihar	Static display
3403	Kolkata	Static display
3415	Rewari	Operational
3430	Sabarmati	Static display
3437	Chandigarh	Static display
3438	Rewari	Operational
3474	Gorakhpur	Inactive
3490	Saharsa	Inactive
3509	Chittaurgarh	Static display
3526	Wankaner	Inactive
3532	Tinsukia	Inactive
3534	Chittaranjan	Static display
3721	Tinsukia	Inactive
4028	Indore	Static display
4029	Tinsukia	Inactive
4091	Lumding	Static display
4092	Saharsa	Inactive
4101	Badarpur	Operational
4119	Guwahati	Static display
4121	Badarpur	Operational
4124	Tinsukia	Inactive
4129	Etawah	Static display
4136	Chennai	Static display
4138	Wankaner	Inactive
4143	Guna	Static display
4159	Wankaner	Inactive
4182	Wankaner	Inactive
4205	Tiruchirappalli	Static display
4232	Rewari	Operational
4252	Rewari	Operational
4310	Tiruchirappalli	Static display
4330	Saharsa	Inactive
4367	Lumding	Static display
4369	Wankaner	Operational
4371	Saharsa	Inactive
4379	Neemuch	Static display
4405	Bhopal	Static display
4422	Tinsukia	Inactive
