= BNR class NM =

Class NM
- BNR 829 with a Katni-bound goods train in the Sahdol district, December 1944
Type and origin
- Power type: Steam
- Builder: Beyer, Peacock & Company
- Serial number: 6705–6714
- Build date: 1931
- Total produced: 10
Specifications
- Configuration
  - Whyte: 4-8-0+0-8-4
- Gauge: 5 ft 6 in (1,676 mm)
- Driver dia.: 4 ft 8 in (1.422 m)
- Axle load: 17.5 long tons (17.8 t)
- Adhesive weight: 138.55 long tons (140.77 t)
- Loco weight: 204.15 long tons (207.43 t)
- Fuel type: Coal
- Fuel capacity: 8 long tons (8.1 t)
- Water cap.: 6,000 imp gal (27,000 L; 7,200 US gal)
- Firebox
  - Grate area: 67.6 sq ft (6.28 m^{2})
- Boiler pressure: 210 psi (1.45 MPa)
- Heating surface: 2,961 sq ft (275.1 m^{2})
- Superheater
  - Heating area: 642 sq ft (59.6 m^{2})
- Cylinders: Four, outside
- Cylinder size: 20 in × 26 in (508 mm × 660 mm)
- Valve gear: Lentz or Caprotti
- Valve type: Poppet
Performance figures
- Tractive effort: 69,660 lbf (309.86 kN)
Career
- Operators: Bengal Nagpur Railway; →Indian Railways
- Numbers: BNR: 826–835; →IR: 38826–38835
- Locale: East Central Railway zone
- First run: 1931
- Withdrawn: Late 1960s
- Disposition: Scrapped

The Bengal Nagpur Railway class NM was a class of ten 4-8-0+0-8-4 Garratt locomotives manufactured by Beyer, Peacock & Company in England. This was modified N class Garratt with a 17-ton axle load. It had thermic siphons and arch tubes for better performance. It worked on the Bilaspur-Katni line and Anuppur-Chirmiri branch line for hauling coal. They were withdrawn by the late 1960s, possibly due to their poppet valves.

Technical specifications
Boiler diameter	7 ft 1 13/16 in (2.18 m)
Heating surface of firebox	330 sq ft (31 m^{2})
Maximum train load	3,000 long tons (3,000 t) on level track
