= BBÖ 378 =

BBÖ 378 DRB class 93.13–14 ÖBB 93
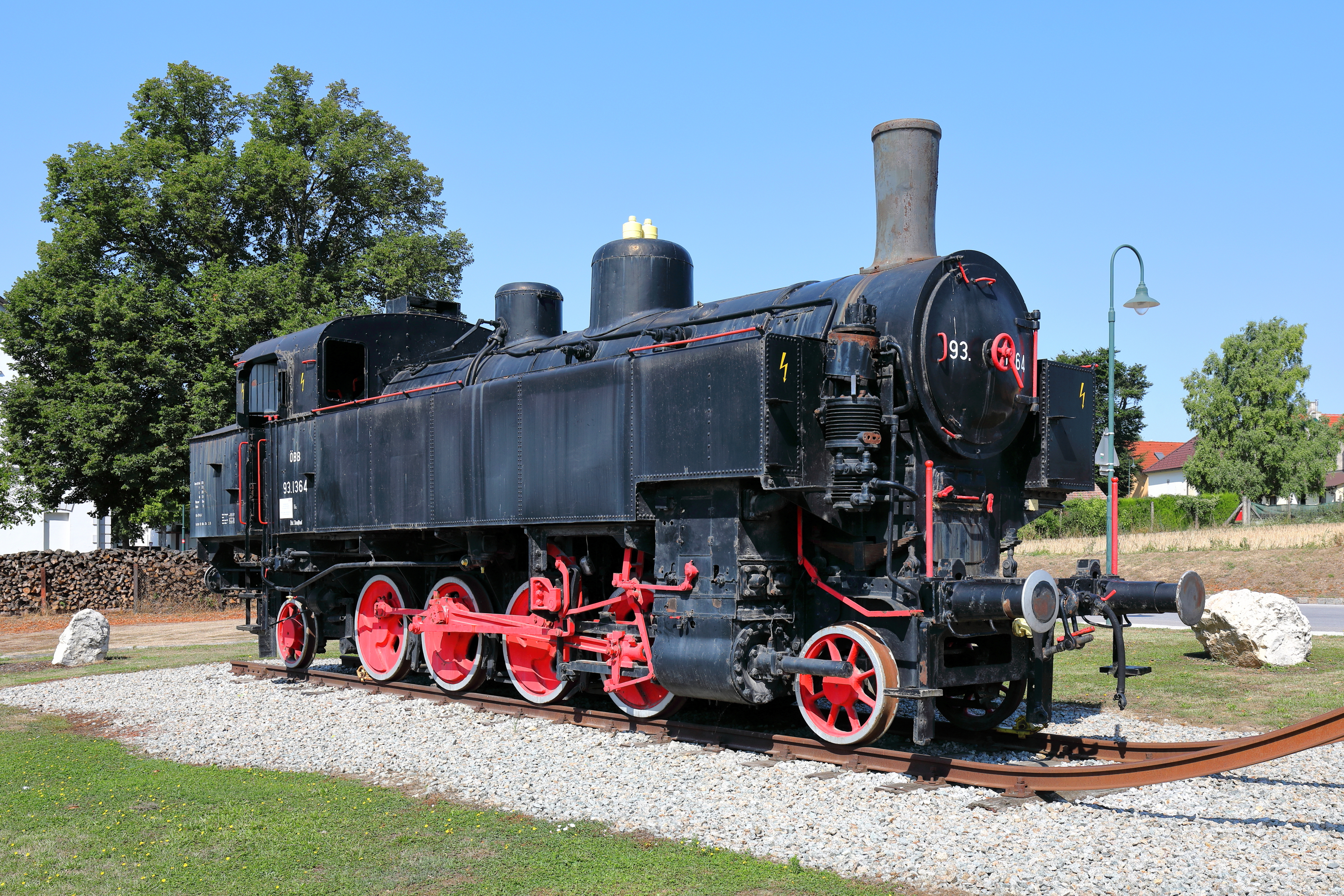
Type and origin
- Builder: Lokomotivfabrik Floridsdorf (82); Lokomotivfabrik der StEG (65); Wiener Neustädter Lokomotivfabrik (10); Krauss (Linz) (10)
- Build date: 1927–1931
- Total produced: 167
Specifications
- Configuration
  - Whyte: 2-8-2T
- Gauge: 1,435 mm (4 ft 8 1/2 in)
- Driver dia.: 1,140 mm (3 ft 8 7/8 in)
- Carrying wheel diameter: 870 mm (2 ft 10 1/4 in)
- Wheelbase
  - Overall: 8,430 mm (27 ft 8 in)
- Length
  - Over beams: 11,960 mm (39 ft 2 3/4 in)
- Height: 4,399 mm (14 ft 5 1/4 in)
- Adhesive weight: 44.0 t (43.3 long tons; 48.5 short tons)
- Service weight: 66.0 t (65.0 long tons; 72.8 short tons)
- Fuel capacity: 3.0 t (6,600 lb)
- Water cap.: 10 m^{3} (2,200 imp gal; 2,600 US gal)
- Boiler
- No. of heating tubes: 109
- Heating tube length: 4,500 mm (14 ft 9 1/4 in)
- Boiler pressure: 14 kgf/cm^{2} (1,370 kPa; 199 lbf/in^{2})
- Heating surface
  - Firebox: 2.0 m^{2} (22 sq ft)
  - Radiative: 9.7 m^{2} (104 sq ft)
  - Tubes: 101.1 m^{2} (1,088 sq ft)
  - Evaporative: 110.8 m^{2} (1,193 sq ft)
- Superheater
  - Heating area: 30.25 m^{2} (325.6 sq ft)
- Cylinders: 2
- Cylinder size: 450 mm (17 11/16 in)
- Piston stroke: 570 mm (22 7/16 in)
- Valve gear: Lenz
- Loco brake: Vacuum, Knorr air brake
Performance figures
- Maximum speed: 60 km/h (37 mph)
- Indicated power: 700 PS (515 kW; 690 hp)
Career
- Numbers: BBÖ: 378.01 – 378.167; DRB: 93 1301 – 93 1467; ÖBB: 93.1301 … 93.1467

The BBÖ 378 (later DRB class 93.13, then ÖBB 93) was a class of 167 Austrian 2-8-2 tank locomotives built by all four Austrian locomotive manufacturers in the 1920s and 1930s.

== History ==
In the 1920s, the competition from road transport was already noticeable in rail operations. In particular, branch line traffic needed to be made more attractive. For this reason, the Federal Railways of Austria (Bundesbahn Österreich, BBÖ) commissioned the Floridsdorf locomotive factory with the design of a superheated steam tank locomotive, which was supposed to provide more output than the Gölsdorf 178 series and was intended to replace numerous other older series. In addition, essential components were to be standardized with the 478 series shunting locomotive, which was being developed at the same time. The branch line locomotive was given the axle formula 1′D1′ (2-8-2) and the designation 378. Without building a prototype locomotive, series production began immediately.

The machines were equipped with Lentz valve gear; attempts with other types of valve gear did not bring any advantages. Like the 178 series, they initially received solid cast disc wheels. Later deliveries returned to cast steel spoke wheels on the leading and trailing axles, and in the last series also on the driving axles. The BBÖ put 167 of this series of locomotives into operation by 1931.

From 1938, the Deutsche Reichsbahn classified the locomotives of this series as 93 1301 – 93 1467.

In 1941 the Slovak State Railways (SŽ) ordered 25 copies in a slightly different form, which were given the designation 431.0. After the Second World War these locomotives remained with the Czechoslovak State Railways (ČSD).

In 1944 the Wiener Lokalbahnen also acquired a copy of this series with a steel firebox, but it was too powerful for the tasks it was intended for, so that it was exchanged for the ÖBB 92.2256 in 1951. The ÖBB initially referred to the former WLB machine as 93.1468, but later as 93.1500.

During the Second World War, eleven locomotives were lost and a total of 28 locomotives were brought to the Yugoslav Railways (JDŽ) in Yugoslavia (partly as reparations), the remaining 128 locomotives passed to the ÖBB. In 1958, 72 units were equipped with a Giesl ejector and front-end throttle – six of them also with micro-spark arresters – which increased their performance by around 30%. The JDŽ also equipped one of its machines with a flat ejector in 1960.

The 93s were in use in the entire secondary line network of the ÖBB. It was the last standard-gauge series of steam locomotives in the ÖBB's inventory. After the official end of steam traction in Austria, some copies remained as “strategic reserves” until 1982.

== Preservation ==
There are nineteen examples preserved at various locations including Das Heizhaus, Strasshof.
