= BBÖ 478 =

BBÖ 478 / DRB 92.25 / ÖBB 392
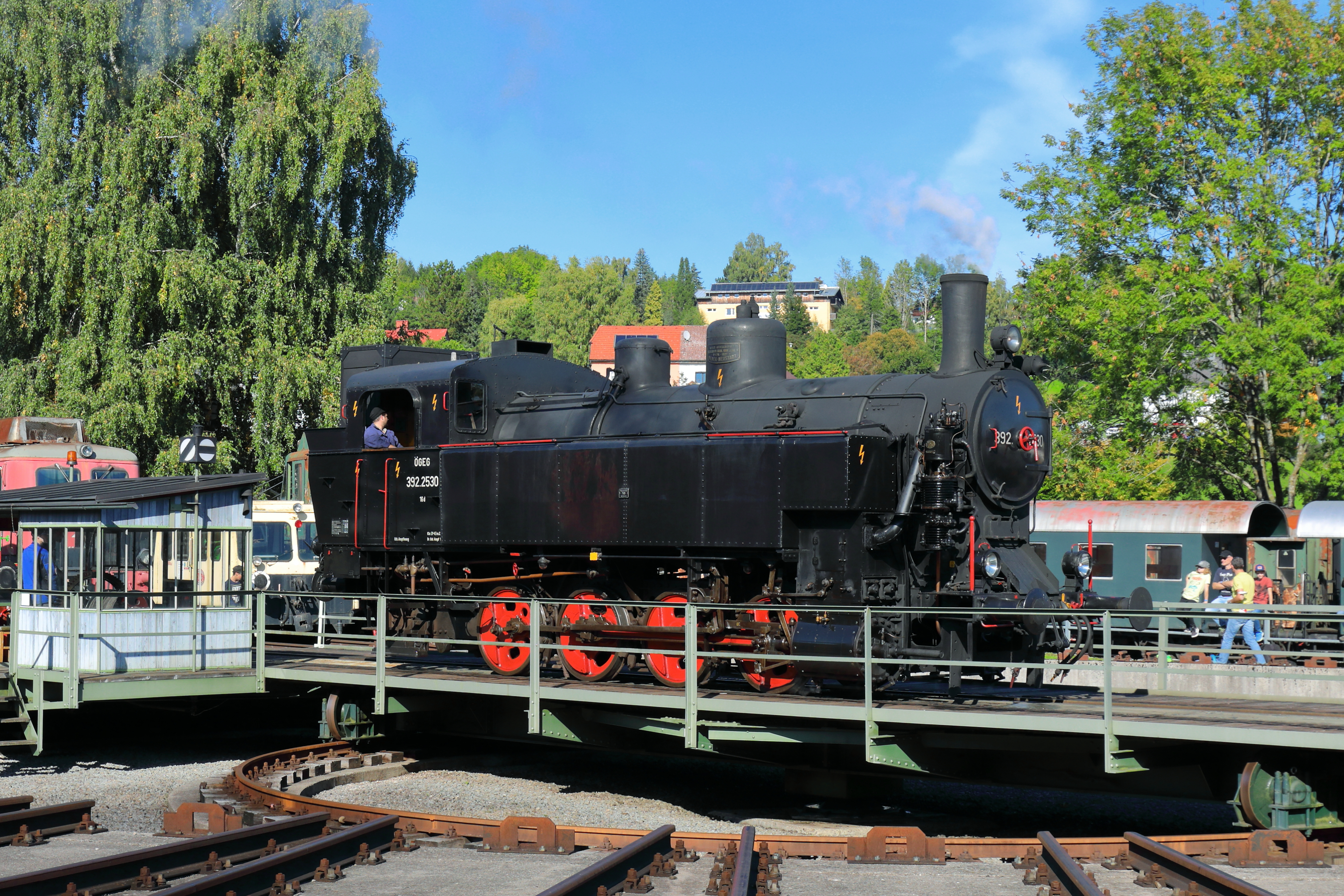
- ÖGEG museum loco 392.2530 in Ampflwang
Type and origin
- Builder: Lokomotivfabrik Floridsdorf (5); Wiener Neustädter Lokomotivfabrik (40); Lokomotivfabrik der StEG (5)
- Build date: 1926–1927
- Total produced: BBÖ: 50; DRB: 50; ÖBB: 43
Specifications
- Configuration
  - Whyte: 0-8-0T
- Gauge: 1,435 mm (4 ft 8 1/2 in)
- Driver dia.: 1,140 mm (3 ft 8 7/8 in)
- Wheelbase
  - Overall: 4,200 mm (13 ft 9 1/4 in)
- Length
  - Over beams: 11,170 mm (36 ft 7 3/4 in)
- Height: 4,399 mm (14 ft 5 1/4 in)
- Adhesive weight: 64.0 t (63.0 long tons; 70.5 short tons)
- Service weight: 64.0 t (63.0 long tons; 70.5 short tons)
- Fuel capacity: 2.5 t (5,500 lb) of coal
- Water cap.: 10 m^{3} (2,200 imp gal; 2,600 US gal)
- Boiler
- No. of heating tubes: 109
- Heating tube length: 4,500 mm (14 ft 9 1/4 in)
- Boiler pressure: 14.0 kgf/cm^{2} (1,370 kPa; 199 lbf/in^{2})
- Heating surface
  - Firebox: 2.00 m^{2} (21.5 sq ft)
  - Radiative: 9.7 m^{2} (104 sq ft)
  - Tubes: 101.1 m^{2} (1,088 sq ft)
  - Evaporative: 110.8 m^{2} (1,193 sq ft)
- Superheater
  - Heating area: 30.25 m^{2} (325.6 sq ft)
- Cylinders: 2
- Cylinder size: 530 mm (20 7/8 in)
- Piston stroke: 570 mm (22 7/16 in)
- Valve gear: Lenz
Performance figures
- Maximum speed: 40 km/h (25 mph)
Career
- Numbers: BBÖ 478.01–478.50; DRB 92 2502 – 92 2550; ÖBB 392.2501–392.2550 (with spacings)
- Retired: 1972

The BBÖ 478 was a class of fifty 0-8-0T shunting locomotives of the Bundesbahnen Österreich (BBÖ).

== History ==
It was common practice in Austria to cascade old tender locomotives that were no longer powerful enough for line service into service as shunters. In the 1920s, however, the BBÖ was faced with a massive shortage of shunting locomotives, as the locomotives used up to then were very outdated. An attempt was made to fill the shortage by buying Swiss locomotives (BBÖ classes 130, 279 and 379). It was clear, however, that the most sensible solution was to buy their own new shunting locomotives.

Since the 378 class branch line locomotive was being developed at the same time, the aim was to design the shunting locomotive class similar to this, while matching as many components as possible. With the omission of the leading and trailing axles, the 478 class was created. In addition to the changes to the frame that resulted from this, the 478 class received slightly larger diameter cylinders, otherwise the two series were practically the same.

As with the 378s, the 478 class immediately went into series production without a test locomotive. The BBÖ acquired a total of 50 locomotives to its fleet. They were initially used in Wien Westbahnhof, Wiener Neustadt and Villach, and later in almost all larger train stations. In the 1930s, some received welded water tanks to reduce leakage.

At the Anschluss of Austria in 1938 the class was initially taken over by the Deutsche Reichsbahn as 92 2301 – 92 2350. But they were soon renumbered as 92 2501 – 92 2550. After the Second World War, the ÖBB retained 43 locomotives, to which they assigned a "3" prefix to the DR number, (392.2501...392.2550). The last 392s were part of the ÖBB until 1972.

The 392.2510 and 392.2530 were preserved; both are owned by the Austrian Society for Railway History (Österreichische Gesellschaft für Eisenbahngeschichte, ÖGEG).

Wolfsegg-Traunthaler Kohlenwerke AG purchased a similar machine in 1941, which in 1959 received a Giesl ejector, front end throttle, and micro-spark arrester. It was retired in 1974.
