= DRB Class 42 =

Class of German locomotives

DRB Class 42 PKP Ty3/43 BDZ class 16 CFL class 55
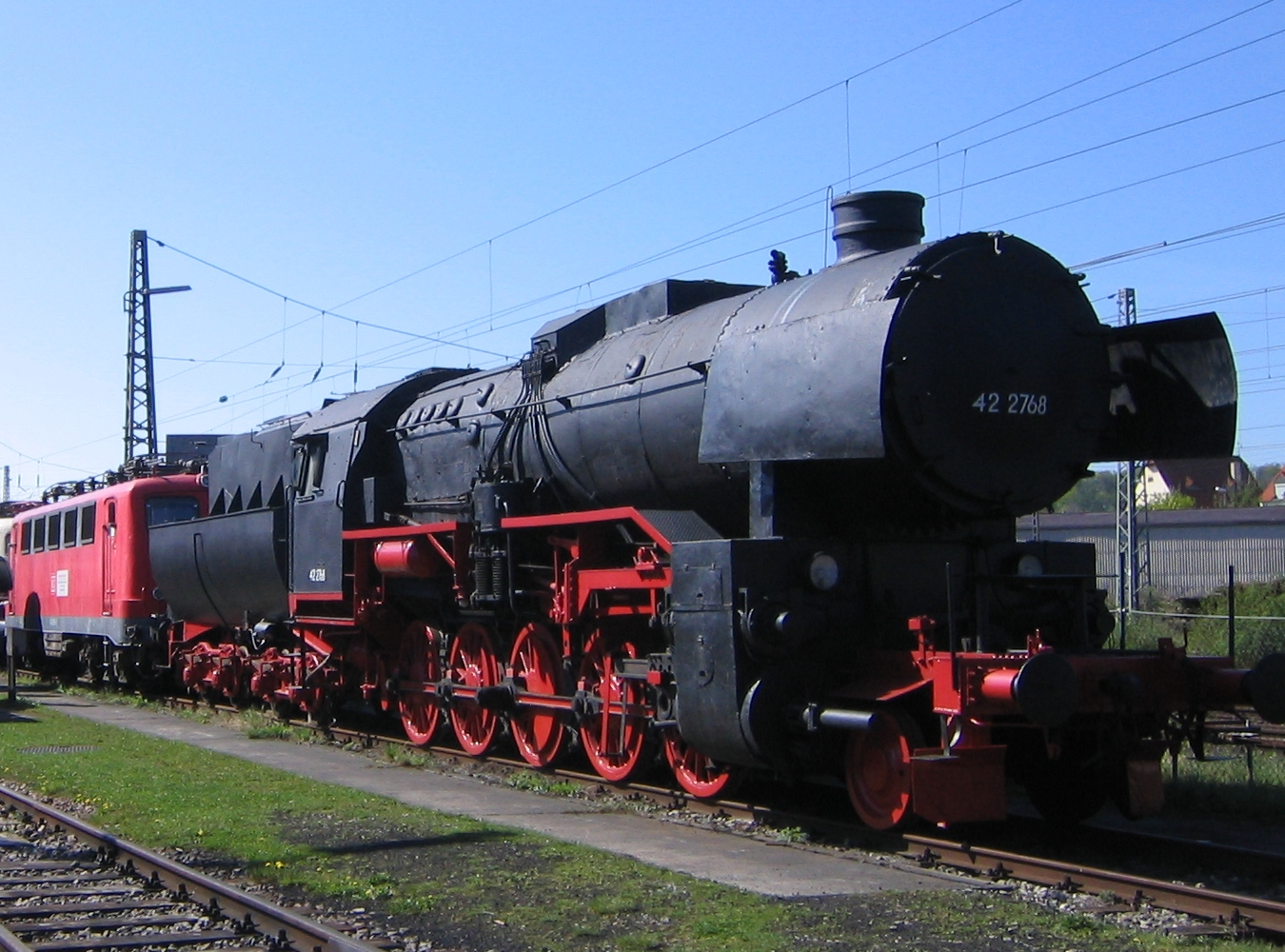
- 42 2768 in BEM Nördlingen, January 2010
Type and origin
- Power type: Steam
- Builder: Henschel & Sohn (2); Berliner Maschinenbau (308); Schichau-Werke (200); Maschinenfabrik Esslingen (87); Lokomotivfabrik Floridsdorf (338)
- Build date: 1943 – 1949
- Total produced: 935
Specifications
- Configuration
  - Whyte: 2-10-0
  - UIC: 1′E h2
  - German: G 56.17
- Driver: Third coupled axle
- Gauge: 1,435 mm (4 ft 8 1/2 in)
- Leading dia.: 850 mm (2 ft 9 1/2 in)
- Driver dia.: 1,400 mm (4 ft 7 1/8 in)
- Tender wheels: 930 mm (3 ft 5/8 in)
- Wheelbase
  - Axle spacing (Asymmetrical): 2,600 mm (8 ft 6 3/8 in) +; 1,650 mm (5 ft 5 in) +; 1,650 mm (5 ft 5 in) +; 1,650 mm (5 ft 5 in) +; 1,650 mm (5 ft 5 in) =
  - Engine: 9,200 mm (30 ft 2 1/4 in)
  - Tender: 1,800 mm (5 ft 10 7/8 in) +; 2,300 mm (7 ft 6 1/2 in) +; 1,800 mm (5 ft 10 7/8 in) =; 5,900 mm (19 ft 4 1/4 in)
  - incl. tender: 19,000 mm (62 ft 4 in)
- Length
  - Over headstocks: 21,700 mm (71 ft 2 3/8 in)
  - Over buffers: 23,000 mm (75 ft 5 1/2 in)
- Height: 4,400 mm (14 ft 5 1/4 in)
- Axle load: 17.2 t (16.9 long tons; 19.0 short tons)
- Adhesive weight: 85.7 t (84.3 long tons; 94.5 short tons)
- Empty weight: 86.8 t (85.4 long tons; 95.7 short tons)
- Service weight: 96.9 t (95.4 long tons; 106.8 short tons)
- Tender type: 2′2′ T 30 or 2′2′ T 32
- Fuel type: Coal
- Fuel capacity: 10 t (9.8 long tons; 11.0 short tons)
- Water cap.: 30.0 or 32 m^{3} (6,600 or 7,040 imp gal; 7,930 or 8,450 US gal)
- Firebox
  - Grate area: 4.7 m^{2} (51 sq ft)
- Boiler
  - Pitch: 3,150 mm (10 ft 4 in)
  - Tube plates: 4,800 mm (15 ft 9 in)
  - Small tubes: 51 mm (2 in), 143 off
  - Large tubes: 133 mm (5 1/4 in), 43 off
- Boiler pressure: 16 bar (16.3 kgf/cm^{2}; 232 lbf/in^{2})
- Heating surface
  - Firebox: 19.3 m^{2} (208 sq ft)
  - Tubes: 99.3 m^{2} (1,069 sq ft)
  - Flues: 81.0 m^{2} (872 sq ft)
  - Total surface: 199.6 m^{2} (2,148 sq ft)
- Superheater
  - Heating area: 75.8 m^{2} (816 sq ft)
- Cylinders: Two, outside
- Cylinder size: 630 mm × 660 mm (24 13/16 in × 26 in)
- Train heating: Steam
Performance figures
- Maximum speed: 80 km/h (50 mph)
- Indicated power: 2,200 PS (1,620 kW; 2,170 hp)
Career
- Operators: Deutsche Reichsbahn
- Numbers: DRG 42 001 ... 42 2810, 42 0001 + 42 0002
- Retired: 1969

The DRB Class 42 (Note: Wartime locomotives classes are prefixed DRB (Deutsche Reichsbahn) to distinguish them from those introduced by the DRG (prefixed DRG), which became defunct in 1937, and those introduced later by the East German Deutsche Reichsbahn (prefixed DR).) was a type of steam locomotive produced for the Deutsche Reichsbahn. It is one of the three main classes of the so-called war locomotives (Kriegslokomotiven), the other two being class 50 and 52.

Seventy of the class were captured during World War II by the Soviet Union; under Russian ownership they were given the classification TL (ТЛ).

== History ==
These engines, built from 1943 onwards, were the second heavy locomotive class of this type after the DRG Class 52. They were built for duties on routes that were cleared for a higher axle load, because they were more economical there than the KDL 1 Kriegslokomotiven of Class 52. In principle they were slimmed down 44s. The Class 42 was procured as Kriegslokomotive KDL 3.

The total of 859 units had a number of improvements to the driving and running gear. Originally it was intended to build very large numbers of these engines, but the end of the Second World War put paid to that. A condenser locomotive, based on the Class 42 was also planned, but did not come to fruition.

At the end of the war there were still half-finished engines in the workshops. So after 1945, 16 engines were built for the Reichsbahn in the western zone by the Maschinenfabrik Esslingen ('Esslingen Locomotive Works'). 126 engines were built by Polish factories for the PKP in Poland as Class Ty43 and three ex DRG engines also went over to the PKP as Class Ty3. Another 76 units were produced by the Lokomotivfabrik Floridsdorf in Vienna. These were not built for the Austrian Federal Railways (ÖBB), but were sold in 1949 to the CFL in Luxembourg - 20 engines (CFL class 55), in 1952 to Bulgarian State Railways (BDZ) - 33 pcs (BDZ class 16). and the rest to DR and various industrial enterprises in East Germany.

The majority of the locomotives that ended up in the Deutsche Bundesbahn were stationed in the Saarland. These were taken out of service by 1960. The engines with the DR continued to work until 1968, and these with BDZ until 1988. Nowadays (2015) there are only two engines in operation - CFL 5519 and BDZ 16.27 (in service since April 2015). They are used for special and tourist trains. Another operational BDZ engine 16.01 is retired since 2013.

The DB and DR locomotives had operating numbers 42 001–2810 and 42 5000. However they did not run consecutively and there were gaps.

The engines were mainly equipped with 2′2′ T 30 or 2′2′ T 32 tenders.

== DB Class 42.90 (Franco-Crosti locomotive) ==
DB Class 42.90
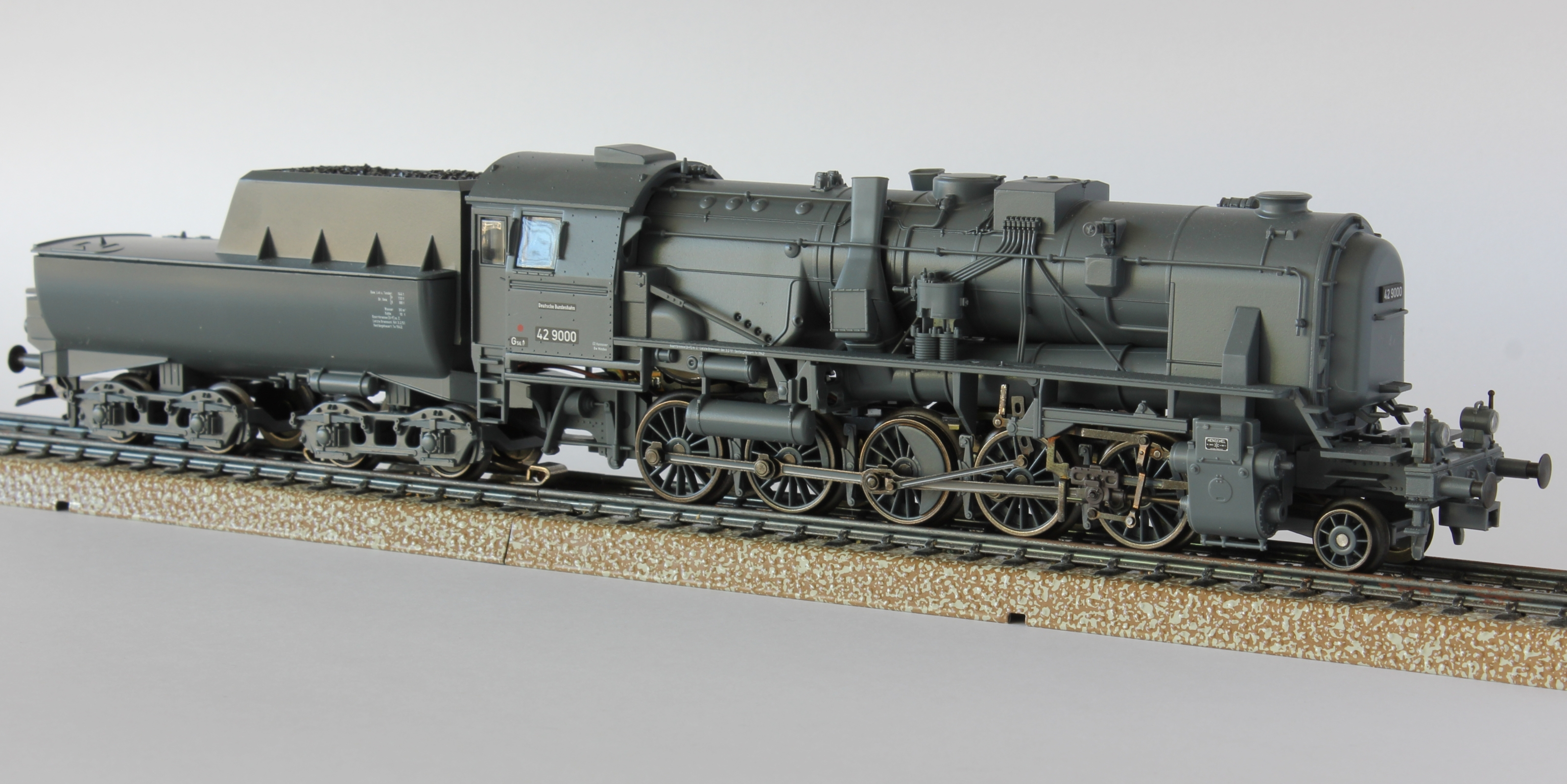
- a model of the DRG 42.90
Type and origin
- Power type: Steam
- Rebuilder: Henschel & Sohn
- Rebuild date: 1951
- Number rebuilt: 2
Specifications
- Configuration
  - Whyte: 2-10-0
  - UIC: 1′E h2
  - German: G 56.18
- Gauge: 1,435 mm (4 ft 8 1/2 in)
- Leading dia.: 850 mm (2 ft 9 1/2 in)
- Driver dia.: 1,400 mm (4 ft 7 1/8 in)
- Tender wheels: 930 mm (3 ft 5/8 in)
- Wheelbase
  - Engine: 9,200 mm (30 ft 2 1/4 in)
  - Tender: 5,900 mm (19 ft 4 1/4 in)
  - incl. tender: 19,000 mm (62 ft 4 in)
- Length
  - Over buffers: 22,975 mm (75 ft 4 1/2 in)
- Axle load: 17.4 t (17.1 long tons; 19.2 short tons)
- Adhesive weight: 87.1 t (85.7 long tons; 96.0 short tons)
- Empty weight: 87.6 t (86.2 long tons; 96.6 short tons)
- Service weight: 98.7 t (97.1 long tons; 108.8 short tons)
- Tender type: 2′2′ T 30
- Fuel type: Coal
- Fuel capacity: 10 t (9.8 long tons; 11 short tons)
- Water cap.: 30 m^{3} (6,600 imp gal; 7,900 US gal)
- Firebox
  - Grate area: 3.9 m^{2} (42 sq ft)
- Boiler
  - Tube plates: 5,200 mm (17 ft 3/4 in)
  - Small tubes: 63.5 mm (2 1/2 in), 42 off
  - Large tubes: 152 mm (6 in), 28 off
- Boiler pressure: 16 bar (16 kgf/cm^{2}; 230 psi)
- Heating surface
  - Firebox: 15.9 m^{2} (171 sq ft)
  - Tubes: 39.5 m^{2} (425 sq ft)
  - Flues: 65.9 m^{2} (709 sq ft)
  - Total surface: 250.2 m^{2} (2,693 sq ft) *
- Superheater
  - Heating area: 63.5 m^{2} (684 sq ft)
- Cylinders: Two, outside
- Cylinder size: 600 mm × 660 mm (23 5/8 in × 26 in)
Performance figures
- Maximum speed: 80 km/h (50 mph)
- Indicated power: 1,630 PS (1,200 kW; 1,610 hp)
Career
- Operators: Deutsche Bundesbahn
- Numbers: 42 9000 – 42 9001
- Retired: 1960
- * includes 128.96 m^{2} (1,388.1 sq ft) in the 206-tube feedwater heater

In 1952, the firm of Henschel rebuilt locomotives 52 893 and 52 894 with Franco-Crosti economisers (Abgasvorwärmer). Because of the resulting higher axle load, the engines were classified by the Deutsche Bundesbahn as Class 42.90 locomotives and given the operating numbers 42 9000 and 42 9001.

Engine number 42 9000 was stabled in Bingerbrück and retired in 1959. In 1960 the second one, stationed in Oberlahnstein, was taken out of service. The experience accumulated with these very economical locomotives was used in the 31 engines of Class 50.40.

Both locomotives were coupled with 2'2' T 30 tenders.

== See also ==
- List of DRG locomotives and railbuses
- The Museum of the Moscow Railway, at Paveletsky Rail Terminal, Moscow
- Rizhsky Rail Terminal, Home of the Moscow Railway Museum
- Varshavsky Rail Terminal, St.Petersburg, Home of the Central Museum of Railway Transport, Russian Federation
- History of rail transport in Russia
