= 4-8-0+0-8-4 =

Garratt locomotive wheel arrangement

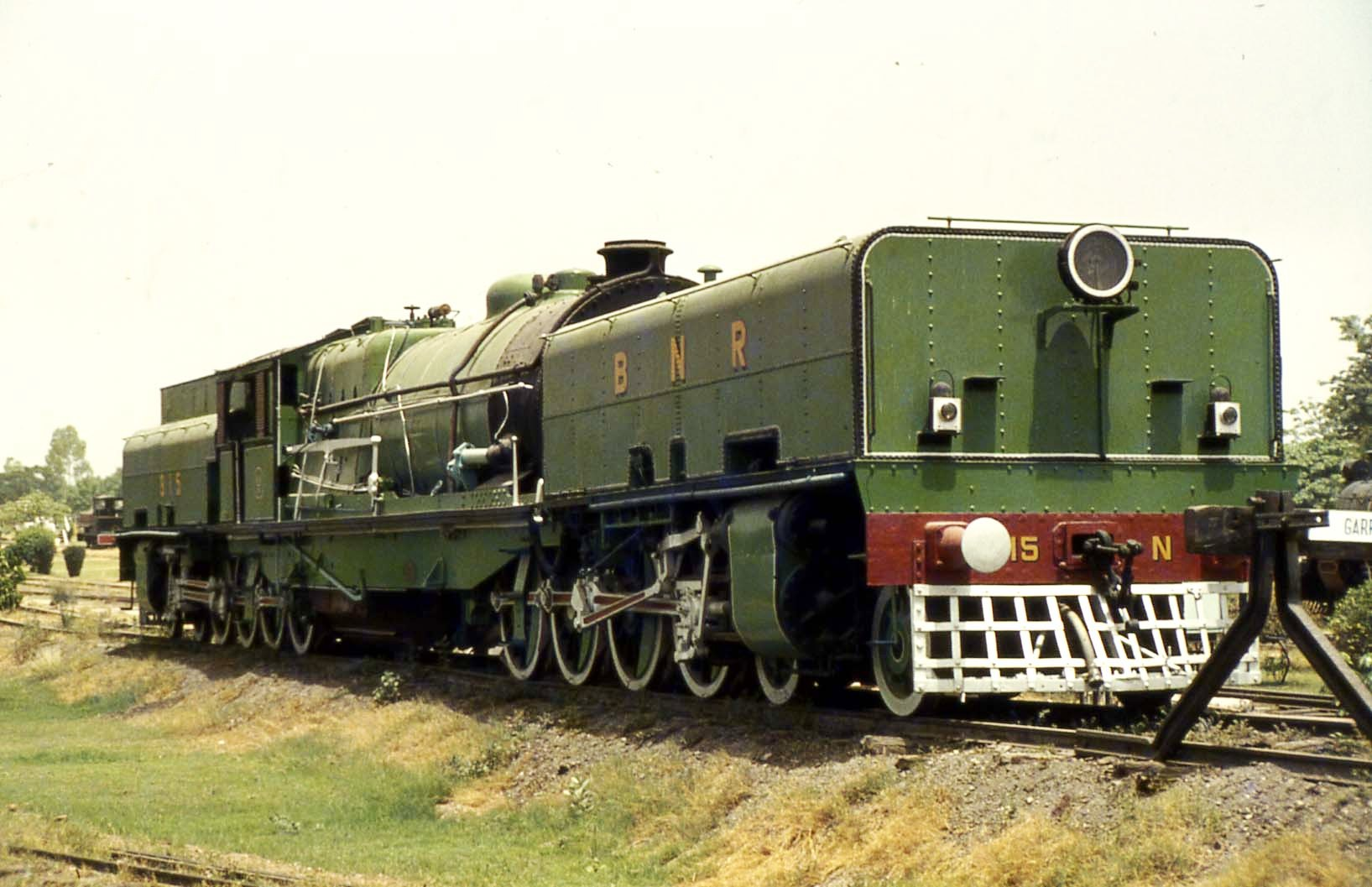
- Bengal Nagpur Railway class N 815
Equivalent classifications
- UIC class: 2D+D2
- French class: 240+042
- Turkish class: 46+46
- Swiss class: 4/6+4/6, 8/12 from 1920s
- Russian class: 2-4-0+0-4-2
First known tank engine version
- First use: 1929
- Country: India
- Locomotive: BNR class N
- Railway: Bengal Nagpur Railway
- Designer: Beyer, Peacock & Company
- Builder: Beyer, Peacock & Company

Under the Whyte notation for the classification of steam locomotives by wheel arrangement, the 4-8-0+0-8-4 is a Garratt articulated locomotive. The wheel arrangement is effectively two 4-8-0 locomotives operating back to back, with the boiler and cab suspended between the two engine units. Each engine unit has two pairs of leading wheels in a leading bogie, followed by four coupled pairs of driving wheels and no trailing wheels. A similar wheel arrangement exists for the Union Pacific Big Boy, but is referred to as 4-8-8-4 since only the front engine unit swivels.

== Overview ==
The 4-8-0+0-8-4 was the fifth rarest Garratt wheel arrangement, with a total of 26 locomotives constructed.

== Usage ==
All the 4-8-0+0-8-4 Garratts were built by Beyer, Peacock & Company for the 5 ft 6 in (1,676 mm) gauge Bengal Nagpur Railway in India. The first 16 were designated Class N and were delivered in 1929, while 10 more arrived in 1931 and were designated class NM. The locomotives had Belpaire fireboxes and piston valves.

Two of the type survive, both of Class N. No. 811 is staged at Kharagpur Workshop, while no. 815 is on display at the National Rail Museum, New Delhi.

4-8-0+0-8-4 Garratt production list – All manufacturers
Gauge	Railway	Class	Works no.	Units	Year	Builder
5 ft 6 in	Bengal Nagpur Railway, India	N	6583–6598	16	1929	Beyer, Peacock & Company
5 ft 6 in	Bengal Nagpur Railway, India	NM	6705–6714	10	1931	Beyer, Peacock & Company
