= Lokomotivfabrik Floridsdorf =

Coordinates: 48°16′02″N 16°23′54″E

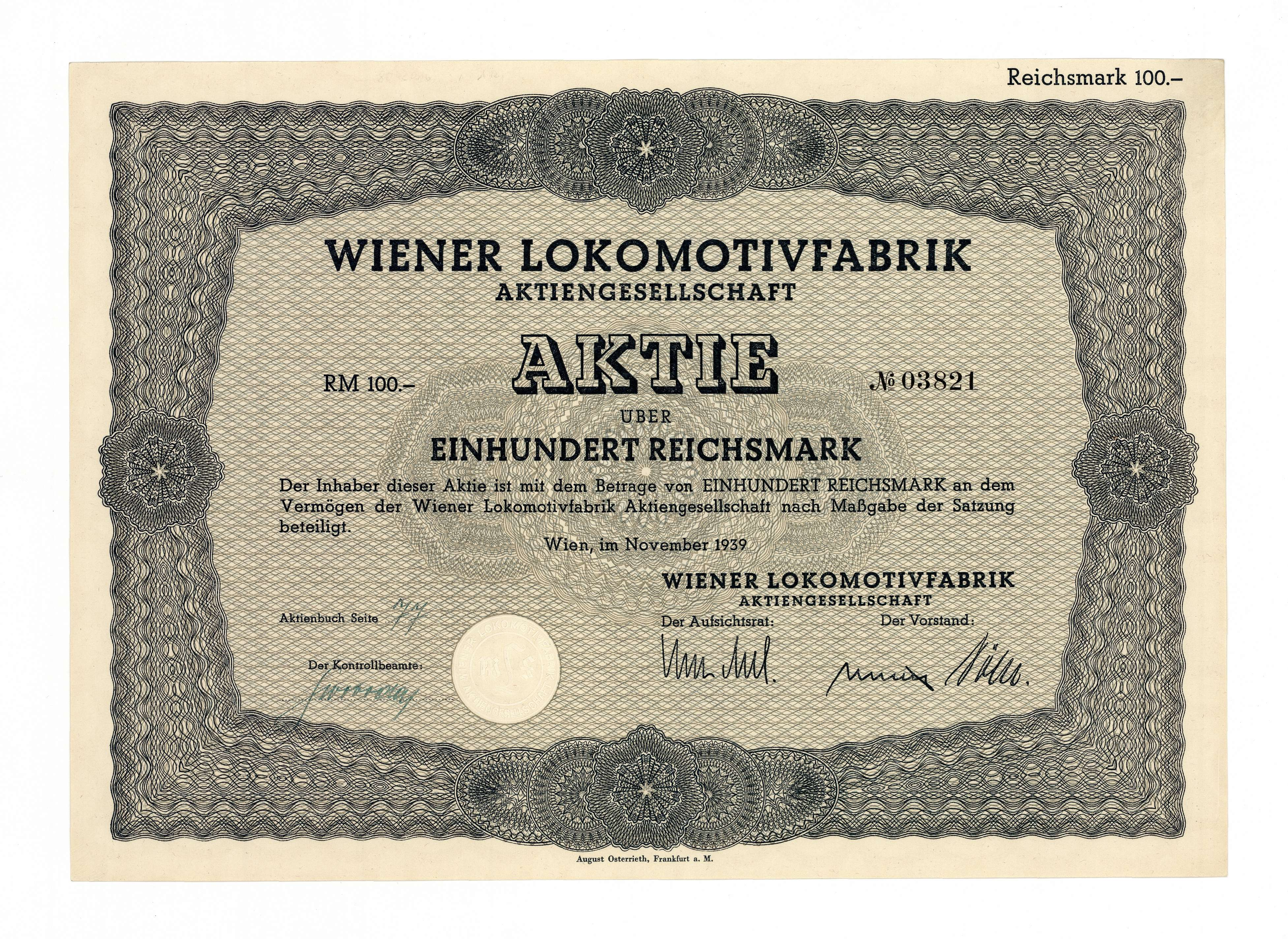
Share of the Wiener Lokomotivfabrik AG, issued November 1939

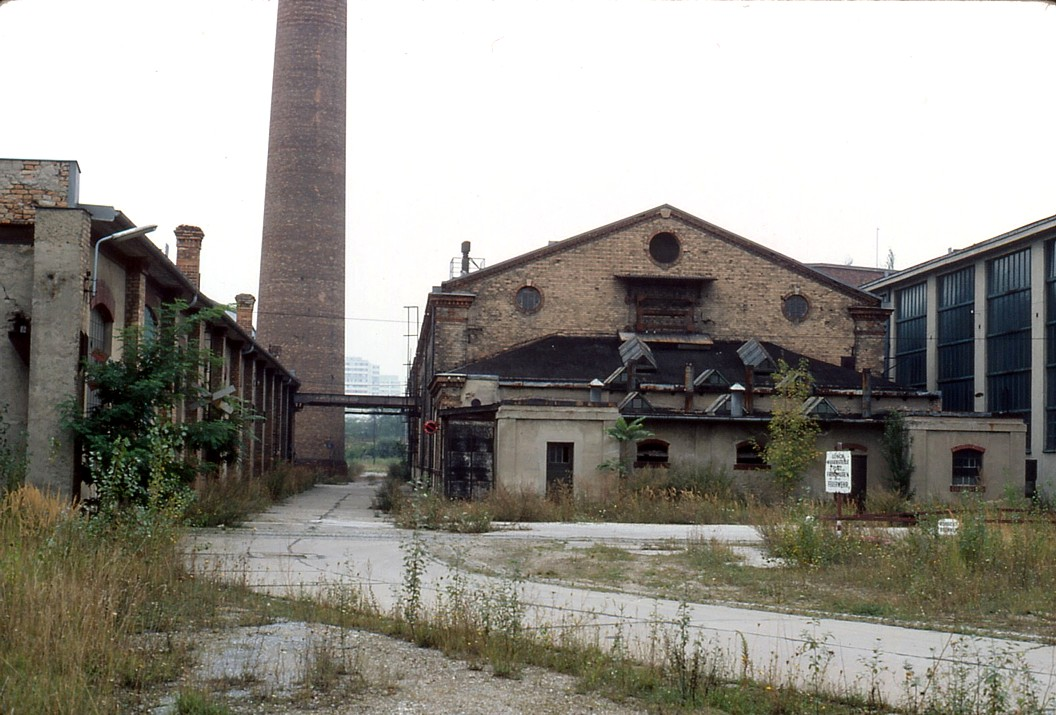
Lokomotivfabrik Floridsdorf

Lokomotivfabrik Floridsdorf (Floridsdorf locomotive factory) was an Austrian locomotive works founded on 6 September 1869 that achieved a pre-eminent place amongst European locomotive builders thanks to the quality and diversity of its designs.

Common abbreviations for the company include Flor, WLF (Wiener Lokomotivfabrik Floridsdorf) and LOFAG (Lokomotivfabrik Floridsdorf AG).

Lokomotivfabrik Floridsdorf was the third factory of its type to emerge in Austria following the Lokomotivfabrik der Staatseisenbahngesellschaft (StEG, Vienna) and that of Georg Sigl, the Wiener Neustädter Lokomotivfabrik, both based in Vienna.

== History ==
The site of the factory, which was founded in 1869, was a piece of open land in Floridsdorf near Vienna between the North railway and the Northwest railway. The generously scaled factory site was erected in 1870/71 by Bernhard Demmer – previously technical director with the StEG. In addition to the buildings needed for production and management, seven workers blocks were built with 117 flats.

Even whilst the factory was being built the company's management were busy looking for business and so, as early as 10 June 1871, the first locomotive, the HUMBOLDT was handed over to its owners, the ÖNWB.

In 1881 the first rack locomotive was designed and built. Its customer was the industrial railway of a Hungarian steelworks. This engine was designed as a narrow gauge locomotive (790 mm rail gauge). Because they were the only licence holders for the Abt rack system in the Danube monarchy, orders for locomotives for the Erzbergbahn and the Bosnia-Hercegovina State Railways (760mm gauge) went to Floridsdorf.

After the military ('Railway Bureau of the General Staff' or Eisenbahnbureau des Generalstabs) had given the go ahead for the electrification of railway lines, the first electric locomotives were built in 1911 for normal rail services.

Like the overall economic situation, orders for locomotives ebbed and flowed. For example, after the crash of the Vienna stock market in 1873 only seven locomotives were sold. The numbers of employees rose and fell correspondingly. In lean years there were fewer than 1,000 workers, whilst in good years over 1,500 personnel were employed. During the Second World War the number of workers climbed to 8,000.

Because a large number of customers were lost after the end of the First World War, company policy had to change. General inspections of steam locomotives were carried out for the Austrian Federal Railways and, from 1922, steam rollers were produced, followed in 1926 by static boiler systems. The construction of industrial facilities was also taken on.

In 1924/1925 former Russian goods train locomotives were converted from broad gauge to standard gauge on behalf of the Polish State Railways and general inspections were carried out.

Of the four locomotive factories in Austria's history during the inter-war years - the others being the StEG in Vienna, Krauss & Co in Linz, Lokomotivfabrik Wiener Neustadt (formerly G. Sigl - only the Floridsdorf locomotive works survived.

During the Second World War the factory suffered from heavy bombing raids, but was able to continue production. It produced mainly steam locomotives of the DRB Class 52: over 1,172 units for the Deutsche Reichsbahn and 20 for the Rumanian CFR (where it was classified as the CFR 150), the highest production figures of all locomotive works involved in the manufacture of the Class 52! From spring 1944, production was switched to the DRB Class 42 and on 13 June 1944, number 42 2301 was handed over to the Reichsbahn. The last and 2,115th, engine built during the war, number 42 2580, left the factory on 9 March 1945.

In mid-April 1945, after the end of the fighting in Vienna, a large part of the factory was dismantled and transported to the Soviet Union. In addition to machinery, raw materials were also spirited away, reportedly 800 wagon loads. In spite of that, at the end of October the first locomotive built after the war, a D 42, stood in front of the factory shed. In addition to the construction of new locomotives, the general inspection of ÖStB locomotives was the main task of the factory due to the destruction of the neighbouring main repair shop at Floridsdorf.

In 1946 the Soviet occupying forces placed the management of the Lokomotivfabrik Floridsdorf under the USIA - an organisation that managed 'Soviet property' in Austria. At the same time the factory was to be transferred to the ownership of the Austrian Republic under the nationalisation law passed on 26 July 1946. This law could not be fully enacted in the Soviet-occupied areas however until the conclusion of negotiations over the Austrian state treaty in 1955.

During its time as a USIA operation, only a few locomotives were built, but the firm manufactured of central heating boilers, cable winches and undercarriages for railway cranes. Not until 1953 was locomotive construction started up again. Initially 99 replacement boilers were delivered to India, then 140 locomotives (60 WG, 30 WP and 50 YG locomotives) were built up to 1958.

On the transfer of the Floridsdorf locomotive works to the Austrian government on 13 August 1955 the nationalisation law of 1945 finally came into effect.

The main products in the time to 1955 were diesel locomotives for home and abroad, including some for Czechoslovakia. Nevertheless, the numbers reduced, which gave the appearance of lower productivity, whereas in fact bogies were being produced as sub-orders for Henschel and the Simmering-Graz-Pauker factory in Simmering. 158 bogies were ordered for railcars on the electric high-speed line from Cairo – Heluan in Egypt.

On 14 February 1958 the merger of the Floridsdorf Lokomotivfabrik with the Simmering-Graz-Pauker AG was completed, which spelt the end of Floridsdorf's existence as an independent company.

There was a large order of 50 diesel locomotives for the Bulgarian State Railways, but overall the books were empty. The production of tank wagons was simply an emergency measure.

On 19 September 1969 the last of 6,043 Floridsdorf locomotives was handed over to the ÖBB, a 1042.540 electric locomotive.

Shortly before the closure of all the facilities in the 1980s, there were discussions about establishing an Austrian transport museum on the site of the locomotive works in the buildings, which were largely still in good condition. However they came to nought and today the factory is no longer there. In its place, in addition to various small firms, are a DIY store and furniture shops, part of Shopping City Nord. One last relict is an obelisk that commemorates the victims of the Nazi regime who were employees at the factory.

== Prominent employees ==
- Adolph Giesl-Gieslingen: His work for the Floridsdorf locomotive factory was interrupted by a year in the USA. In 1938 he returned and, after the Second World War became the chief engineer.
- Franz Jonas: The qualified printer worked after 1938 as an accountant at the Floridsdorf locomotive works. From 22 June 1951 he was the mayor and Landeshauptmann of Vienna and from 1 June 1965 to his death on 24 April 1974 he was the President of Austria.

== Literature ==
- Johann Stockklausner: Die Wiener Lokomotivfabrik Floridsdorf. Eisenbahn-Kurier Verlag GmbH Freiburg, ISBN 3-88255-561-0
- Ingrid Trummer, Alexander Stollhof (Hrsg.): "...Bei uns in der Lofag...", Erinnerungen an die Floridsdorfer Lokomotivfabrik - Wiens größter Industriebetrieb. Edition Volkshochschule, Wien 2005, ISBN 3-900799-67-9
