= Indian locomotive class WG =

Indian WG
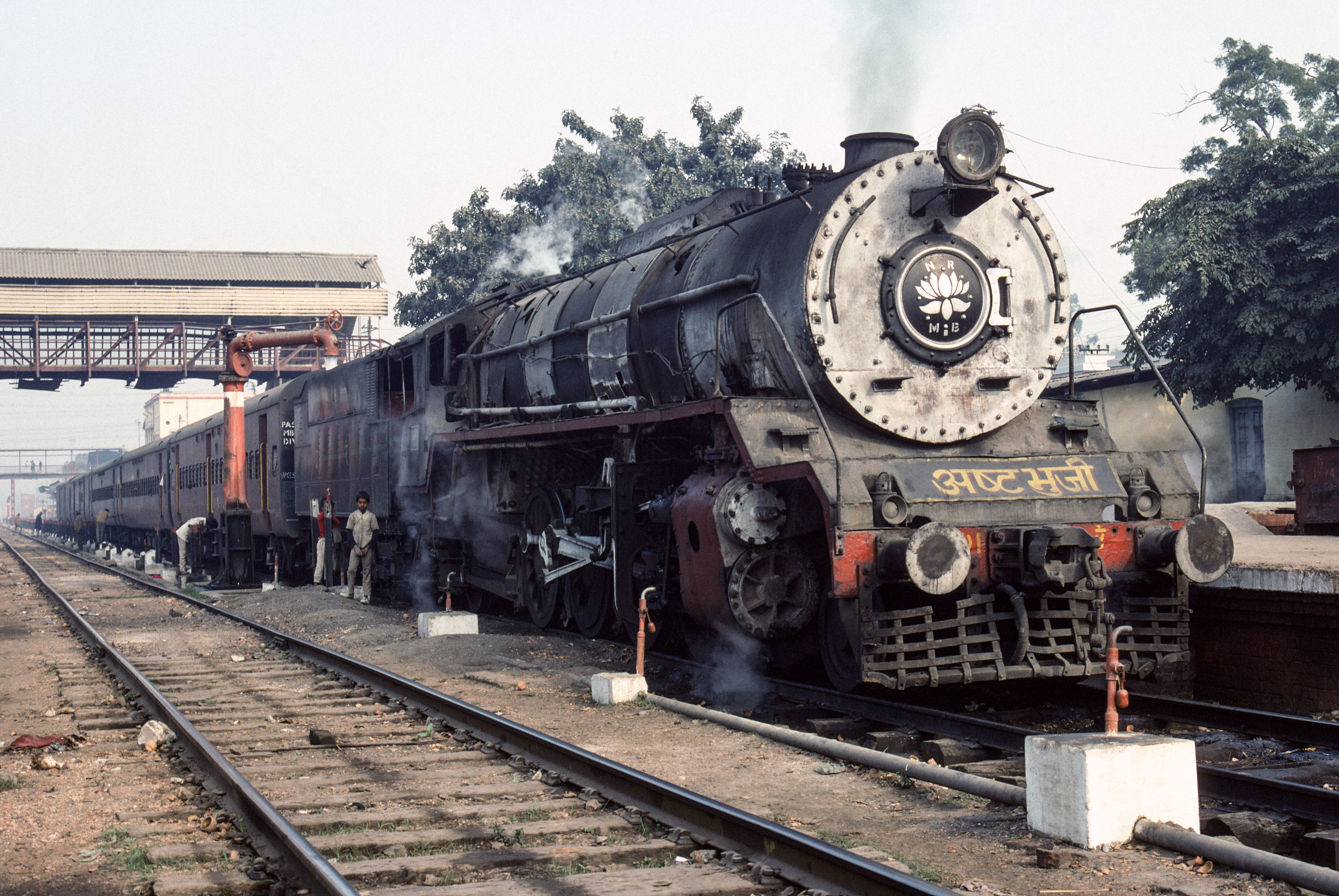
- WG class 10491 by Chittaranjan Locomotive Works from 1966/7, with a passenger train at Bareilly Junction, in 1993
Type and origin
- Power type: Steam
- Builder: Chittaranjan Locomotive Works (1908); North British Locomotive Company (115); NBL (subcontracted to Vulcan Foundry) 10; Anglo-Franco-Belge (La Croyère) (18); AFB (subcontracted to Henschel) (64); Gio. Ansaldo & C. (25); Baldwin Locomotive Works (50); Henschel & Sohn (60); Hitachi (100); Krupp (40); Lokomotivfabrik Floridsdorf (60)
- Build date: 1950–1970
- Total produced: 2,450
Specifications
- Configuration
  - Whyte: 2-8-2
  - UIC: 1′D1′ h2
- Gauge: 5 ft 6 in (1,676 mm)
- Driver dia.: 61 1/2 in (1,562 mm)
- Axle load: 18 long tons 10 cwt (41,400 lb or 18.8 t)
- Loco weight: 101 long tons 17 cwt (228,100 lb or 103.5 t)
- Tender weight: 71 long tons 16 cwt (160,800 lb or 73 t)
- Total weight: 173 long tons 13 cwt (389,000 lb or 176.4 t)
- Fuel type: Coal
- Fuel capacity: 15 t (14.8 long tons; 16.5 short tons)
- Water cap.: 25,000 L (5,500 imp gal; 6,600 US gal)
- Firebox
  - Grate area: 46 sq ft (4.3 m^{2})
- Boiler pressure: 210 lbf/in^{2} (1.45 MPa)
- Heating surface: 2,920 sq ft (271 m^{2})
- Cylinders: Two, outside
- Cylinder size: 21 7/8 in × 28 in (556 mm × 711 mm)
- Loco brake: Vacuum, some later converted to air
- Train brakes: Vacuum, some later converted to air
Performance figures
- Maximum speed: 80 km/h (50 mph)
- Power output: 2,600 hp (1,900 kW)
- Tractive effort: 38,890 lbf (172.99 kN)
Career
- Operators: Indian Railways
- Numbers: 8000–8289; 8301–8999; 9100–10560
- Nicknames: Deshbandhu, Antim sitara, Ashtabhuji, etc.
- Locale: All over India
- Delivered: 1950
- First run: 1950
- Last run: late 1990s
- Retired: late 1990s
- Withdrawn: 1970s-1990s
- Restored: 2019 (1 i.e. Emperor Ashok)
- Scrapped: Early 1990s to early 2000s
- Current owner: Rewari Railway Heritage Museum, Indian Railways
- Disposition: Withdrawn from service, 9 preserved, remainder scrapped, 1 in working condition
- Sources: except where noted

The Indian Railways WG class was a type of broad gauge 2-8-2 goods locomotive introduced in the 1950s. 2,450 of the class were built between 1950 and 1970, making them the most numerous class of mainline locomotives until the advent of WDM-2.

== History and design ==
The WG design was introduced in 1950; it used identical equipment (boiler, motion, springs, tender bogies, and rear truck) to the 4-6-2 WP class passenger locomotives. The first hundred units (No. 8301 to 8400) were built by North British and subcontractor Vulcan Foundry (ten units). Number 8350 was exhibited at the Festival of Britain in 1951.

Locomotives were also sourced from the Société Franco-Belge in Raismes, France, Lokomotivfabrik Floridsdorf in Austria, and from elsewhere in Europe and from Japan. The rolling stock works of Chittaranjan Locomotive Works in West Bengal initially manufactured locomotives from imported parts; by 1953, 70% of the locomotives were domestically produced, and by 1956 the works was able to entirely satisfy the domestic production need for WG locomotives. Production ceased in 1970; the final unit being named Antim Sitara (Last Star).

== Class table ==
Table of orders and numbers
Year	Manufacturer	Serial Nos.	Qty Ordered	Qty Built	All-India Nos.	Notes
1950	North British	26415-26514	100	90	8301-8400	10 were subcontracted to Vulcan Foundry
1950	Vulcan (Subcontract)	5996-6005	—	10		8307,8309,8315,8322, 8328-8329,8335-8336, 8342-8343
1950-1954	Chittaranjan	—	100	100	8401-8500	
1954-1955	Société Anglo-Franco-Belge	2687-2768	82	18	8501-8582	64 were subcontracted to Henschel & Sohn
1954-1955	Henschel & Sohn (Subcontract)	29217-29280	—	64		
1954-1956	Chittaranjan	—	257	257	8583-8839	
1954	Henschel & Sohn	28984-29043	60	60	8840-8899	
1954	Krupp	3391-3430	40	40	8900-8939	
1954	Lokomotivfabrik Floridsdorf	17704-17763	60	60	8940-8999	
1955	Baldwin	76039-76088	50	50	9100-9149	These were the last steam locomotives Baldwin built since its first locomotive in 1832
1955-1956	Hitachi	12261-12285	25	25	9150-9174	
1955	North British	27594-27618	25	25	9175-9199	
1956	Gio. Ansaldo & C.	1398-1422	25	25	9200-9224	
1954-1955	Hitachi	12173-12247	75	75	9225-9299	
1956-1970	Chittaranjan	—	1261	1261	9300-10560	
1959-1960	Chittaranjan	—	290	290	8000-8289	

== Preservation ==
Nine WG's are preserved in India: WG 9673 is preserved on a pedestal (without its tender) outside Rajendra Nagar Station New Delhi, WG 10253, was plinthed at the Zonal Training School Bhusaval, but 2018 removed from the pedestal and sent to Rewari to be restored in working condition. WG 9428 is used at the UP Cement Corporation, WG 9391 is preserved and stored in Burdwan, WG 8258 is preserved on a static pedestal on public display in Sahibganj Junction railway station, WG 10527 is stored in a shed in Burdwan, WG 9286 is preserved by Sri Durga Trading Company, WG 8407 "Deshbandhu" became the first WG to be preserved into Indian Railway Heritage, it is stored Pedestal along with WG 10560 "Antim Sitara" at Chittaranjan Locomotive Works.

Working	Class	Number	Location	Built	Zone	Builders	Build No	Name
No	WG	8407	Chittaranjan Locomotive Works	1950	CLW	Chittaranjan Locomotive Works	-	Deshbandhu
No	WG	9391	Burdwan Loco Shed	1956	ER	Chittaranjan Locomotive Works	-	
No	WG	8258	Sahibganj Loco Shed	1959	ER	Chittaranjan Locomotive Works	-	
Yes	WG	10253	Rewari Steam Shed	1964	NW	Chittaranjan Locomotive Works	-	Ashoka
No	WG	10527	Burdwan Loco Shed	1969	ER	Chittaranjan Locomotive Works	-	
No	WG	10560	Chittaranjan Locomotive Works	1970	CLW	Chittaranjan Locomotive Works	-	Antim Sitara
No	WG	9673	Rajendra Nagar Station New Delhi	1957-1959	ECR	Chittaranjan Locomotive Works	-	
No	WG	9428	UP Cement Corporation	1957-1959		Chittaranjan Locomotive Works	-	
No	WG	9286	Sri Durga Trading Company	1955		Hitachi	12234	

== See also ==
- BR Standard Class 9F 92220 Evening Star is also similar in nature and name to WG class no. 10650 Antim Sitara, the former being British Railway's (BR) last steam locomotive
- Indian Railways
- Rail transport in India § History
- Locomotives of India
- Rail transport in India
