= Indian locomotive class WP =

Class of 755 Indian 4-6-2 locomotives

Indian WP
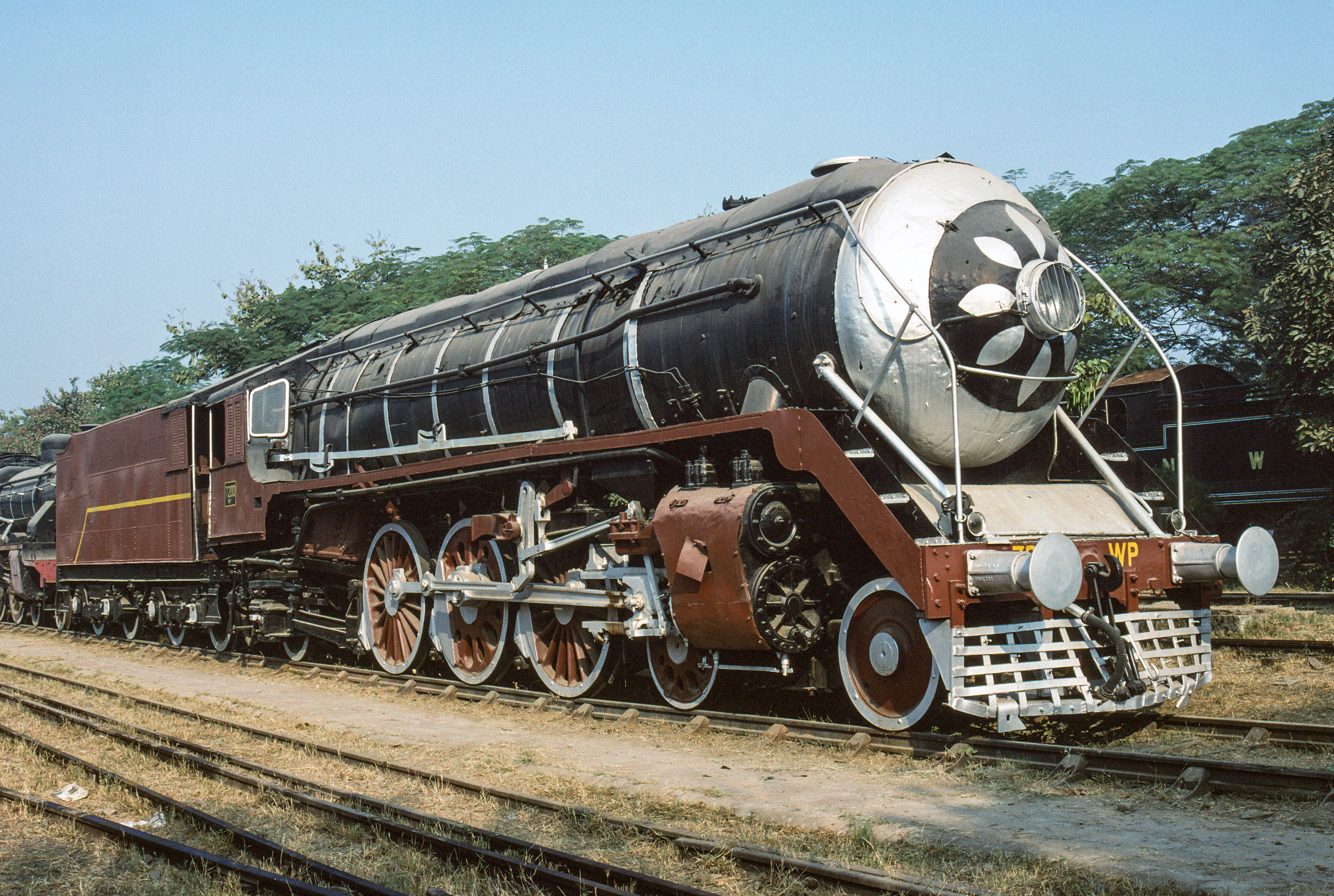
- Baldwin-built WP/P class no. 7200 from 1947, at the National Rail Museum, New Delhi, in 1993
Type and origin
- Power type: Steam
- Builder: (United States) Baldwin Locomotive Works (116) (Canada) Canadian Locomotive Company (200) (Canada) Montreal Locomotive Works (120) (Poland) Fablok, (30) (Austria) Lokomotivfabrik Floridsdorf (30) (India) Chittaranjan Locomotive Works (259)
- Build date: 1947–1967
- Total produced: 755
Specifications
- Configuration
  - Whyte: 4-6-2
  - UIC: 2′C1′ h2
- Gauge: 5 ft 6 in (1,676 mm)
- Leading dia.: 3 ft 7 in (1.092 m)
- Driver dia.: 5 ft 7 in (1.702 m)
- Trailing dia.: 3 ft 7 in (1.092 m)
- Length: 77 ft 5 3/8 in (23.61 m) over buffers
- Axle load: 18.5 long tons (18.8 t; 20.7 short tons)
- Loco weight: 101.5 long tons (103.1 t; 113.7 short tons)
- Tender weight: 72.0 long tons (73.2 t; 80.6 short tons)
- Fuel type: Coal
- Fuel capacity: 15 long tons (15 t; 17 short tons)
- Water cap.: 5,500 imp gal (25,000 L; 6,600 US gal)
- Firebox
  - Grate area: 46 sq ft (4.3 m^{2})
- Boiler pressure: 210 psi (1.45 MPa)
- Heating surface: 2,920 sq ft (271 m^{2})
- Cylinders: Two, outside
- Cylinder size: 20 1/4 in × 28 in (514 mm × 711 mm)
- Valve gear: Walschaerts
- Valve type: 12 in (305 mm) piston valves
- Valve travel: 7 1/2 in (191 mm)
- Loco brake: Originally vacuum, later modified to air
- Train brakes: Originally vacuum, later modified to air
Performance figures
- Maximum speed: 115 km/h (71 mph)
- Power output: 2,680 hp (1,998 kW) drawbar (est.) at 74 mph (119 km/h)
- Tractive effort: 30,600 lbf (136.12 kN)
Career
- Operators: Indian Railways
- Numbers: 7000–7754
- Locale: India
- Delivered: 1947
- First run: 1947
- Last run: Late 1990s
- Retired: Late 1990s
- Withdrawn: Late 1990s
- Preserved: 9
- Disposition: 9 preserved, remainder scrapped

The Indian locomotive class WP are a class of 4-6-2 "Pacific" passenger steam locomotives used in India introduced in 1947 for passenger services. The class were assigned the newly-implemented (and current) classification letter for broad gauge locomotives, W from the previously used X, when the class and the post-war broad gauge locomotive designs for Indian railways it was part of were introduced. WP class locomotives were capable of going up to 110 km/h (68 mph) and had bullet-nose casings fitted on their smokeboxes, which would often have a star painted on it.

WP no. 7200, New Delhi

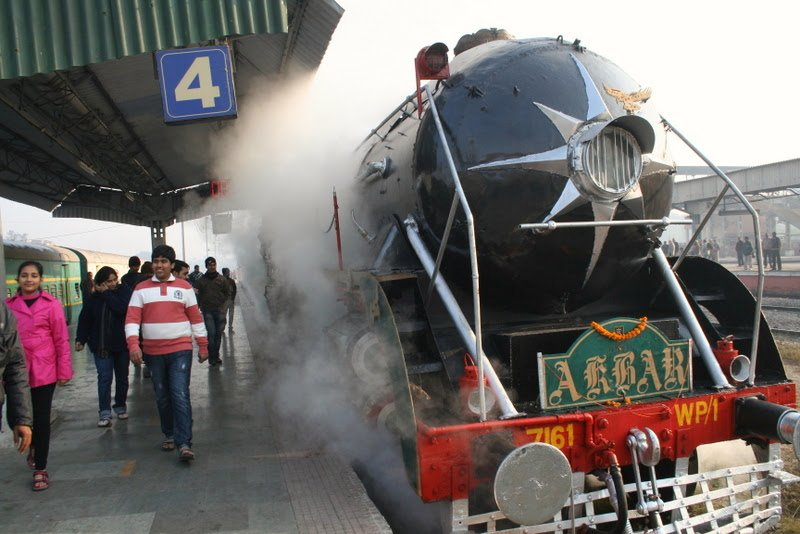
WP no. 7161, renamed Akbar

== History ==
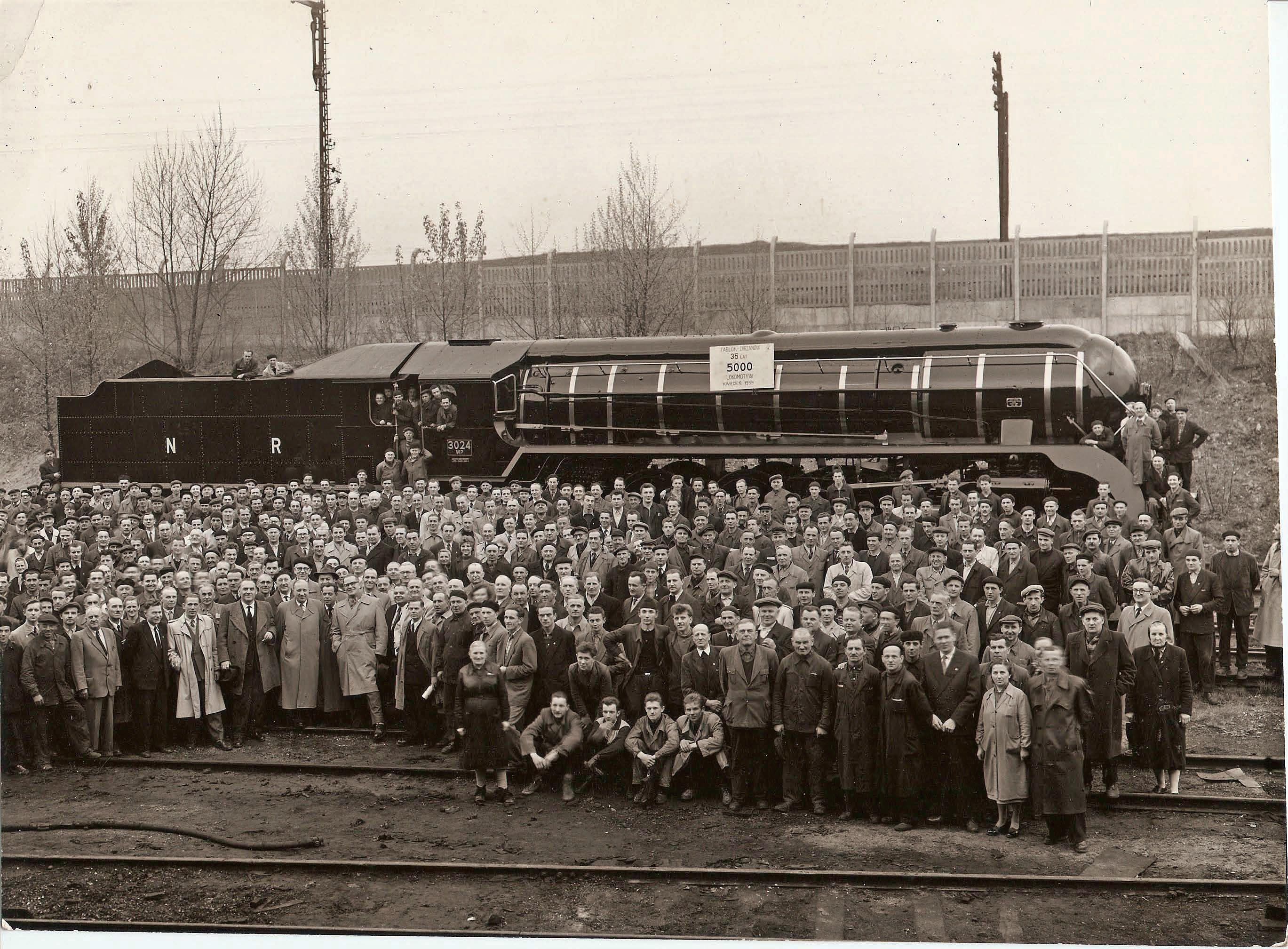
Fablok-built WPs in 1959

A total of 755 WPs were built between 1947 and 1967, bearing fleet numbers 7000 to 7754. The first batch of sixteen, numbers 7200–7215, came from the Baldwin Locomotive Works, USA in 1947, and these were classed WP/P, with P for Prototype.

A main production batch of 300 locomotives followed in 1949, with production split between Baldwin Locomotive Works (100), Montreal Locomotive Works (120), and Canadian Locomotive Company (80). The locomotives in this group were numbered 7216–7515, but the running numbers were issued in blocks as the locomotives were issued to the pre-nationalisation companies, and so bore no relation to the manufacturers' serial numbers, or even the manufacturer.

A further 180 locomotives were built between 1955 and 1959, with production split between Canadian Locomotive Company (120), Fabryka Lokomotyw, of Chrzanów, Poland (30), and Lokomotivfabrik Floridsdorf of Vienna, Austria (30).

Between 1963 and 1966, 259 more were built, but these were ordered from Chittaranjan Locomotive Works (CLW), and were manufactured in India, and classified WP/I. The WP/Is were 5 tonnes heavier. The first WP/I locomotive rolled out from Chittaranjan Locomotive Works (CLW) in February of 1963 and was named Vivenkananda.

The WP was the Indian Railways' fastest locomotive in the 1960s and 1970s. Before the widespread introduction of diesel and electric locomotives, several prestigious trains, such as the Taj Express, the Grand Trunk Express, Howrah-Madras Mail, Frontier Mail and the Air-Conditioned Express were once hauled by WP class locomotives.

The entire WP class remained in service into the 1980s. Several WPs remained in service until withdrawal 1990s.

== Technical specifications ==
- Boiler: 5 ft 11 in (1.80 m) diameter
- Heating surface: 3,082 sq ft (286.3 m^{2})
- Maximum train load: 680 tonnes

== Class table ==
Table of orders and numbers
| Year | Manufacturer | Serial Nos. | Qty | First Nos. | All-India Nos. | Notes |
|---|---|---|---|---|---|---|
| 1947 | Baldwin | 73408–73423 | 16 | — | 7200–7215 | Prototypes |
| 1949 | Baldwin | 74294–74393 | 100 | 1–100 | | In range 7216–7515 |
| 1949 | Canadian | 2544–2623 | 80 | C251–C330 | | In range 7216–7515 |
| 1949 | Montreal | 77200–77259; 77345–74399; 77576–77580 | 120 | M1–M120 | | In range 7216–7515 |
| 1955–56 | Canadian | 2730–2849 | 120 | — | 7516–7635 | |
| 1958–59 | Fablok | 4997–5006; 5031–5050 | 30 | 3000–3029 | 7000–7029 | |
| 1957 | Floridsdorf | 17827–17856 | 30 | 3030–3059 | 7030–7059 | |
| 1963 | Chittaranjan | — | 36 | — | 7060–7095 | 7060 named Vivenkananda |
| 1963–64 | Chittaranjan | — | 50 | — | 7096–7145 | |
| 1964–65 | Chittaranjan | — | 33 | — | 7146–7178 | |
| 1965 | Chittaranjan | — | 73 | — | 7179–7199; 7636–7687 | |
| 1966 | Chittaranjan | — | 37 | — | 7688–7724 | |
| 1966 | Chittaranjan | — | 30 | — | 7725–7754 | |

== Preservation ==
Nine WP class locomotives have been preserved. Among them, one built by Baldwin, number 7200, in 1947 and another by Fablok in 1959 are part of the collection of the National Rail Museum, New Delhi.

WP7200 received a complete overhaul at Amritsar works in April 2015 and is now kept at Rewari shed near New Delhi for excursion service. Apart from 7200, the remaining eight engines include 7278 constructed by Montreal Locomotive Works and preserved at Charbagh Loco Works, 7581 built by Canadian Locomotive Company is preserved at Sonepur DRM, 7656 built by Chittaranjan Locomotive Works is preserved at Jhansi Institute Railway, and 7000 built by Fablok is preserved in Bhusaval shed.

7411 is preserved in Burdwan and awaiting transfer to the Chennai Museum. The engine is missing its builder's plates, thus its builder is not known, however, records indicating its 1949 allocation to the then still existing Great Indian Peninsula Railway (GIPR) suggest it is a product of one of the North American builders. 7015 built by Fablok is another Polish-built preserved WP and has been restored to full mainline running order and runs mainline heritage excursion special trains, being preserved at Rewari shed; 7161 is another locomotive built by Chittaranjan which has been fully restored to full working order on mainline excursions, being preserved at Siliguri. One additional engine is believed to be in existence; however, its details and whereabouts are not known.

| Working | Class | Number | Location | Built | Zone | Builders | Build No | Name |
|---|---|---|---|---|---|---|---|---|
| Yes | WP/P | 7200 | Rewari Steam Shed | 1947 | NW | Baldwin | 73408 | Shahanshah/Azad |
| No | WP | 7278 | Charbagh Loco Works | 1949 | NR | Montreal | | |
| No | WP | 7411 | Burdwan Loco Shed | 1949 | ER | Baldwin/Canadian/Montreal | | |
| No | WP | 7581 | DRM Office, Sonepur | 1955 | ECR | Canadian | | |
| No | WP | 7000 | Rewari Steam Shed | 1958 | CR | Fablok | 4997 | Shaktiman |
| Yes | WP | 7015 | Rewari Steam Shed | 1958 | NW | Fablok | 5036 | |
| Yes | WP/I | 7161 | Rewari Steam Shed | 1965 | NW | Chittaranjan | | Akbar |
| No | WP/I | 7656 | Senior Institute, Jhansi | 1968 | NCR | Chittaranjan | | |
| No | WP | 7??? | ? | 19?? | ? | Possibly Floridsdorf | ? | |

== See also ==
- Rail transport in India § History
- Indian Railways
- Locomotives of India
- Rail transport in India
