= Great Indian Peninsula Railway =

Railway company in British India (1849–1951)

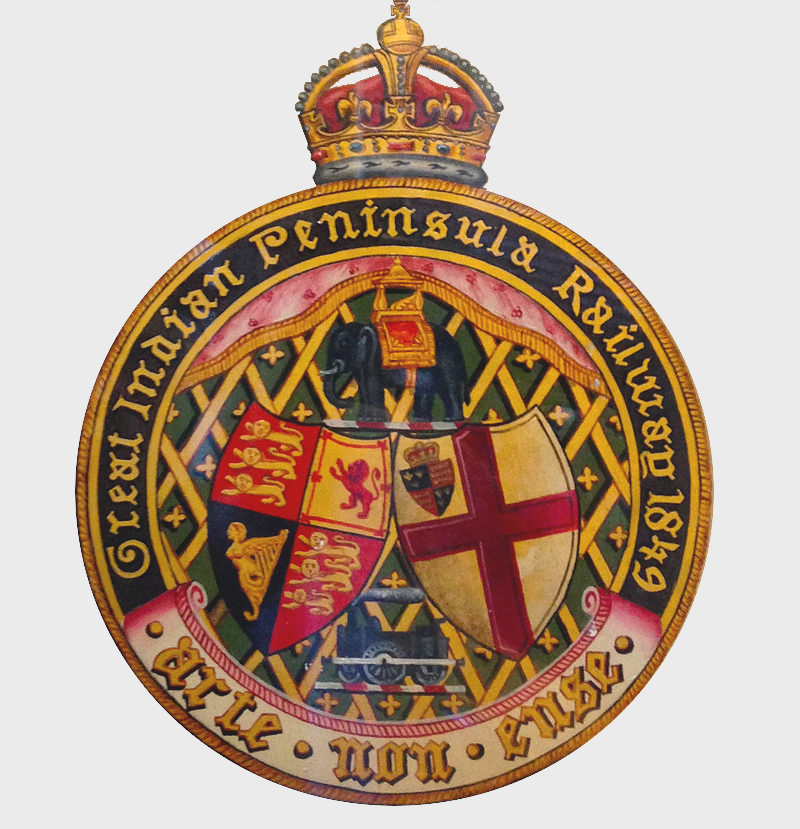

Overview
- Headquarters: Bombay, British India
- Locale: British India
- Dates of operation: 1 August 1849–5 November 1951

Technical
- Track gauge: 5'6" or 1676 mm

Great Indian Peninsula Railway Company Act 1849
- Act of Parliament
- Parliament of the United Kingdom
- Long title: An Act to incorporate the Great Indian Peninsula Railway Company, and for purposes connected therewith.
- Citation: 12 & 13 Vict. c. lxxxiii
- Territorial extent: British Raj

Dates
- Royal assent: 1 August 1849
Other legislation
Amended by	Great Indian Peninsula Railway Company Act 1854

Text of statute as originally enacted

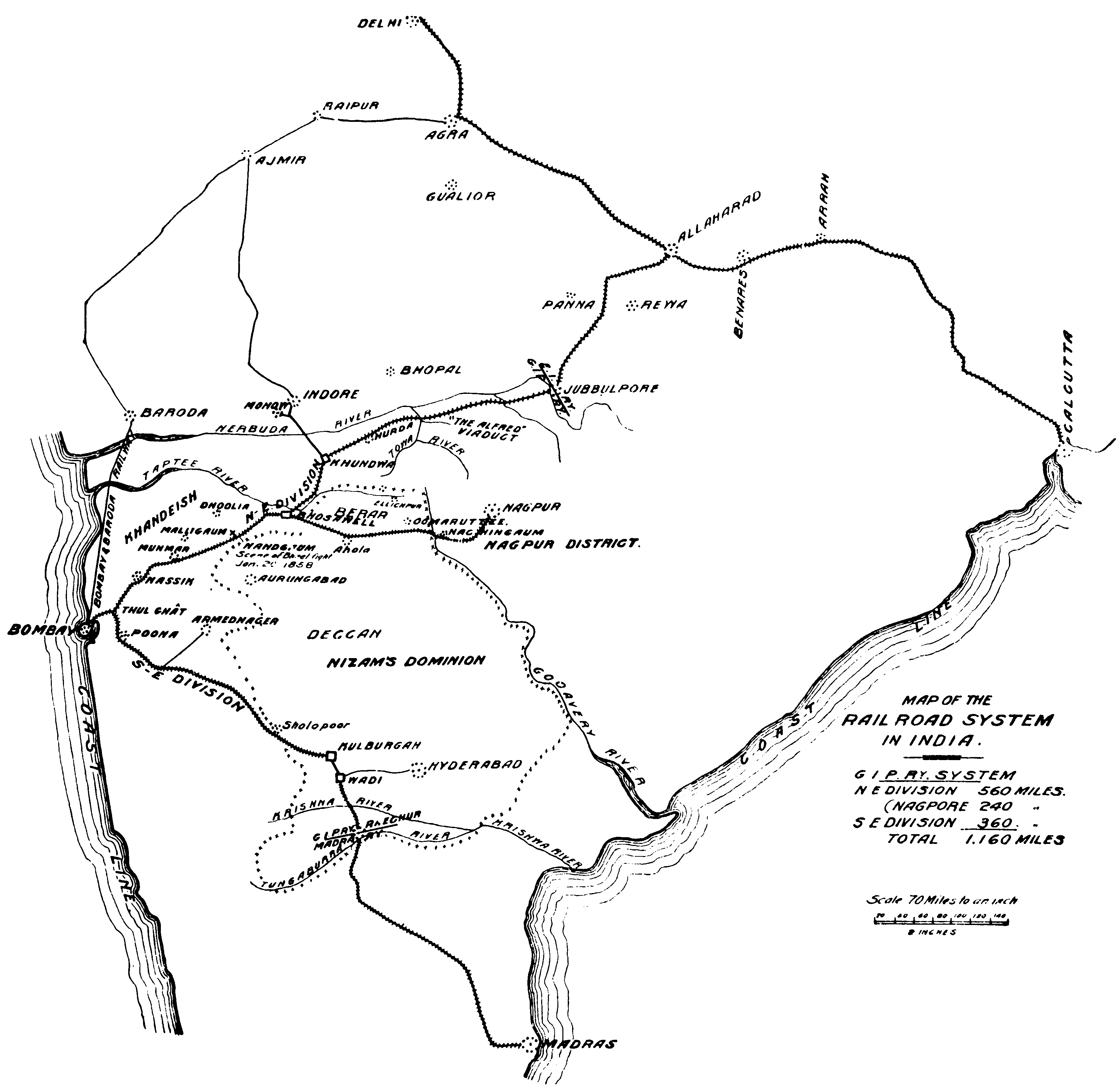
Extent of Great Indian Peninsula Railway network in 1870

The Great Indian Peninsula Railway (reporting mark GIPR) was a predecessor of the Central Railway (and by extension, the current state-owned Indian Railways), whose headquarters was at the Bori Bunder railway station in Mumbai (later, the Victoria Terminus and presently the Chhatrapati Shivaji Terminus). The Great Indian Peninsula Railway Company was incorporated on 1 August 1849 by the Great Indian Peninsula Railway Company Act 1849 (12 & 13 Vict. c. lxxxiii) of the Parliament of the United Kingdom. It had a share capital of 50,000 pounds. On 21 August 1847 it entered into a formal contract with the East India Company for the construction and operation of a railway line, 56 km long, to form part of a trunk line connecting Bombay with Khandesh and Berar and generally with the other presidencies of India. The Court of Directors of the East India Company appointed James John Berkley as Chief Resident Engineer and Charles Buchanan Ker and Robert Wilfred Graham as his assistants. It was India's first passenger railway, the original 21 miles (33.8 km) section opening in 1853, between Bombay (Mumbai) and Tanna (now Thane). On 1 July 1925, its management was taken over by the government. On 5 November 1951, it was incorporated into the Central Railway. Its main line is now the Mumbai–Chennai line of Indian Railways.

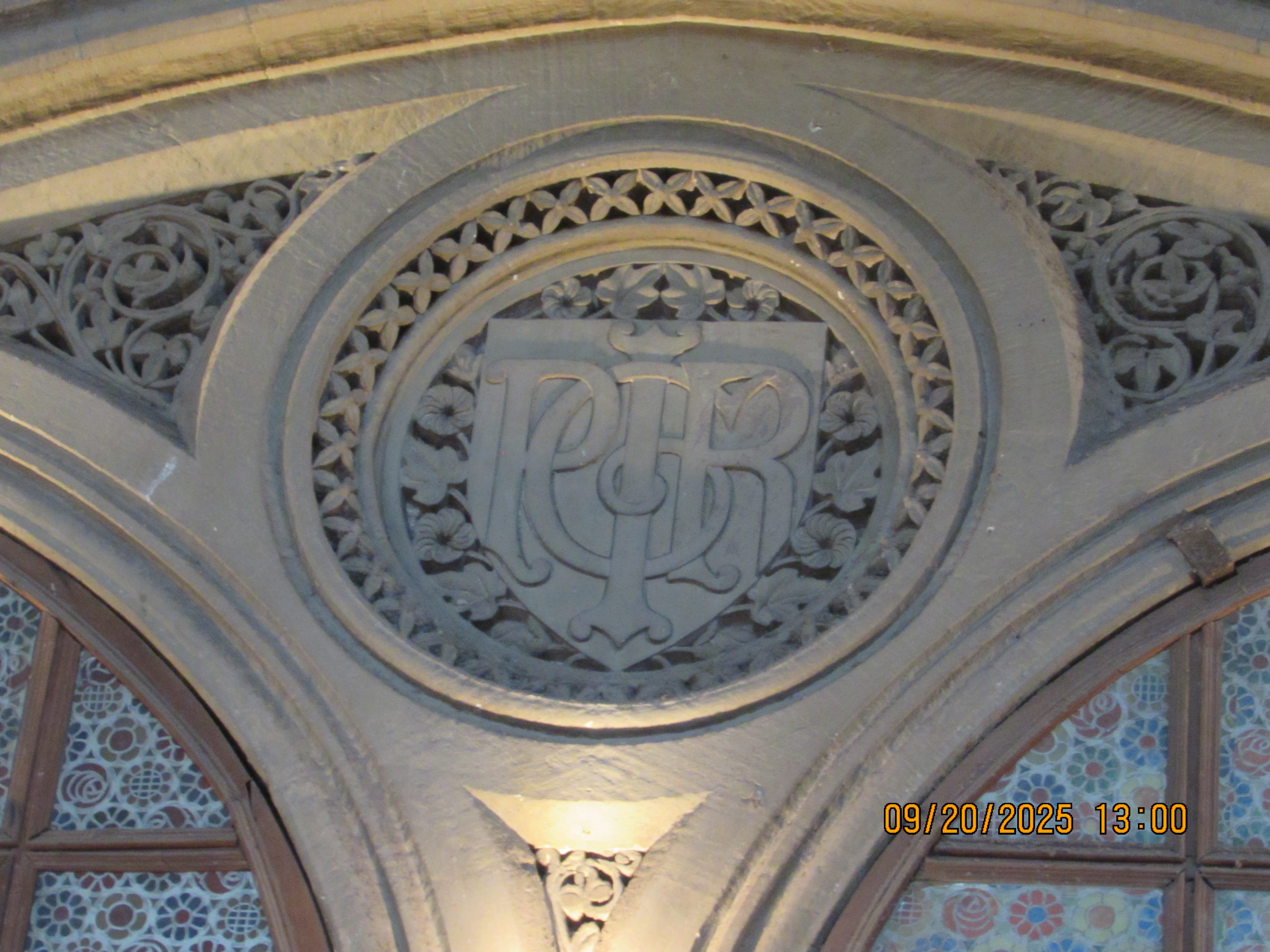
Monogram of the Great Indian Peninsular Railway, in Chhatrapati Shivaji Terminus's booking office

== Incorporation in London ==
Great Indian Peninsula Railway Company Act 1854
- Act of Parliament
- Parliament of the United Kingdom
- Long title: An Act to amend the Act incorporating the Great Indian Peninsula Railway Company, and for other Purposes connected therewith.
- Citation: 17 & 18 Vict. c. xliv
- Territorial extent: United Kingdom

Dates
- Royal assent: 2 June 1854
- Commencement: 2 June 1854
- Repealed: 31 January 2013 (Note: The Acts of Parliament (Commencement) Act 1793.)
Other legislation
Amends	Great Indian Peninsula Railway Company Act 1849
Repealed by	Statute Law (Repeals) Act 2013

Status: Repealed

Text of statute as originally enacted

The Great Indian Peninsula Railway was incorporated as a company in 1849 by John Chapman, with its head office in London. The line was initially proposed to run for a length of 1,300 mi (2,100 km), to connect Bombay with the interior of the Indian peninsula and to the major port of Madras (Chennai) on the east coast. It was intended to connect the towns of Poona (Pune), Nassuek (Nashik), Aurungabad (Aurangabad), Ahmednuggur (Ahmednagar), Sholapoor (Solapur), Nagpore (Nagpur), Akola (West Berar), Oomrawutty (Amravati), and Hyderabad. It was meant for the purpose of increasing the export of cotton, silk, opium, sugar and spices.

The management committee consisted of 25 British men, including officials of the East India Company and banks in London, most of whom resided in Britain and some who had resided in India. The original 25 person board consisted of people such as John Stuart-Wortley and William Hamilton (both MPs from Britain who became the company's chairman and deputy chairman), Frederick Ayrton (ex-East India Company), cavalrymen such as Major Clayton and Major-General Briggs, Bombay residents John Graham, Col. Dickenson, Jagannath Shankarseth and Jamsetjee Jejeebhoy, bankers such as John Harvey (Commercial Bank of London) and S. Jervis (Director of the London and County Bank, Lombard Street), and directors of other railway companies such as Richard Paterson (Chairman of the Northern and Eastern Railway Company) and Melvil Wilson (Director of the Alliance Assurance Office).

== Beginnings in Bombay ==
A year after the passing of the Great Indian Peninsula Railway Company Act 1849 (12 & 13 Vict. c. lxxxiii), the first sod was turned at Sion on 30 October 1850, by the Chief secretary of Bombay Government, John P. Willoughby. The line was meant to be an "experimental line" between Bombay and Thana, whose gauge was set at 5' 6'' (1676 mm) by Governor General Lord Dalhousie in January 1851. The contract for this segment was handed to the contractors Faviell and Fowler, while the next segment from Tannah to Callian (today's Kalyan) to contractors George Wythes and William Jackson along with Jamsetjee Dorabjee Naegamwalla.

Work began, but was soon slowed down by heavy showers in October 1851. This was the same year the first locomotives for this line (Locomotives GIP-2 to 9) were built at the Vulcan Foundry in England. Several problems were encountered, for instance, the laying of the line among the swamp at Sion, worker strikes, among others. There were questions regarding whether the experimental line be a single-track or double-track. The contract opted for the latter option, but there were other ideas as doing so would have saved money. In the end, the Government of Bombay asked to retain the double-track option, owing to complications in contracts and finances.

=== The First locomotive ===
The following year, in 1852, Bombay received its first locomotive. Built by E. B. Wilson, the same firm that built Roorkee's locomotive Thomason, it was brought by sea to Bombay. On its arrival, it was pulled down a public road by 200 coolies, before it was put on the rails. This Locomotive was named "Lord Falkland" after the then Governor of Bombay, Lucius Bentinck Cary, who reportedly left the city on the eve of the occasion.

This locomotive was a tank engine, meaning that it had all its fuel, water and boiler on the same frame, not having an external tender wagon. Four wheels were attached to the cranked driving shaft, and placed in the center. The Telegraph further stated that efforts were made to prepare the loco for work by 'the end of the week'.

The locomotive had its first run on 23 February 1852 from its stationing at Byculla to Parel. Thousands crowded around the place, watching the loco at the entrance of its shed. The excitement was immense, with the natives amazed when the loco commenced its maiden journey. The engine started at a walking speed, later travelling at 15 miles an hour (about 24 km/h). A crowd ran after the moving contraption, hardly leaving the tracks clear. The locomotive traveled the 2 miles (3.2 km) between Byculla and Parel, waiting at its destination for some time. The second trip was also completed, notably with a lady being among the passengers. On both trips the loco was stopped briefly, to correct some small matters; however, the engine was found to be in proper order.

Around this time there arose debates on what vocabulary be introduced for the railways in native languages. The natives had already started referring to railways, in their language, some calling it "Aag Boat"' (the term for steam boats). Without proper words to describe the railway systems, even the 1854 translation of the Lardner's Rail Economy (translated by Krishnashastri Bhatwadekar in Marathi) referred to rail roads as "Lokhandi Rustey" the term for Iron Roads, hence even the name of the book was Lokhandi Rustyanche Sunshipt Vurnan (translated as "A Short Account of Iron Roads"). Some translations were soon suggested.

The locomotive in its shed at Byculla drew crowds of thousands from over the city. When it began its operations, sometimes carrying twelve wagons of Ballast up the steep slopes, the natives standing in the way in astonishment. For the natives, it was a mesmerizing experience, for they had never seen such an immensity traveling on rails. Not satisfied by watching from sides, the crowds would come extremely close to the operating locomotive, only paving way when the loco came a few meters away. Police was ordered around the line for the safety of the observers. Finally twelve men with sticks were employed to keep check on the crowd. Some people sought an opportunity, setting up stalls of Toddy and cakes, to sell to the visitors.

The same year, three locomotives and the rail carriages arrived on the ship, Charles along with six European locomotive drivers in September 1852.

=== The First trial run ===
The first trial run was conducted between Bombay and Thane on 18 November 1852, at noon. The locomotives and the carriages were not yet in order (having arrived only 2 months previously). Hence the same Lord Falkland was employed as the locomotive, with trucks, temporarily fitted to be used as carriages. The journey was to start at noon, reaching the destination of Parsick (Parsik) point at about 1 p.m. They were to have their tiffin in the tunnel there, and to return at sunset, as reported by the Allen's Indian Mail of 1852. The passengers were the engineers, directors and their friends. The journey started soon after twelve p.m., later halting at near the beginning of the Salsette Island for refilling water. The entire journey was extensively described by the newspaper The Bombay Times and Journal of Commerce (now The Times of India). The journey was reported completed in 45 mins, the highest speed being 50 mph (about 80 km/h), with the average of 30 mph (about 48 km/h). This journey paved the way for the first official run, the following year, on 16 April 1853, that formally began the era of the Indian Railways.

== The first train journey ==
On 16 April 1853, the GIPR conducted the run of the first commercial passenger train in India, from Bori Bunder to Thane with 14 carriages and 400 passengers. The train hauled by three locomotives from Vulcan Foundry, took off and embarked on an fifty-seven minute journey to Thane. The journey covered a distance of 21 miles (34 km), formally heralding the birth of the Indian Railways.

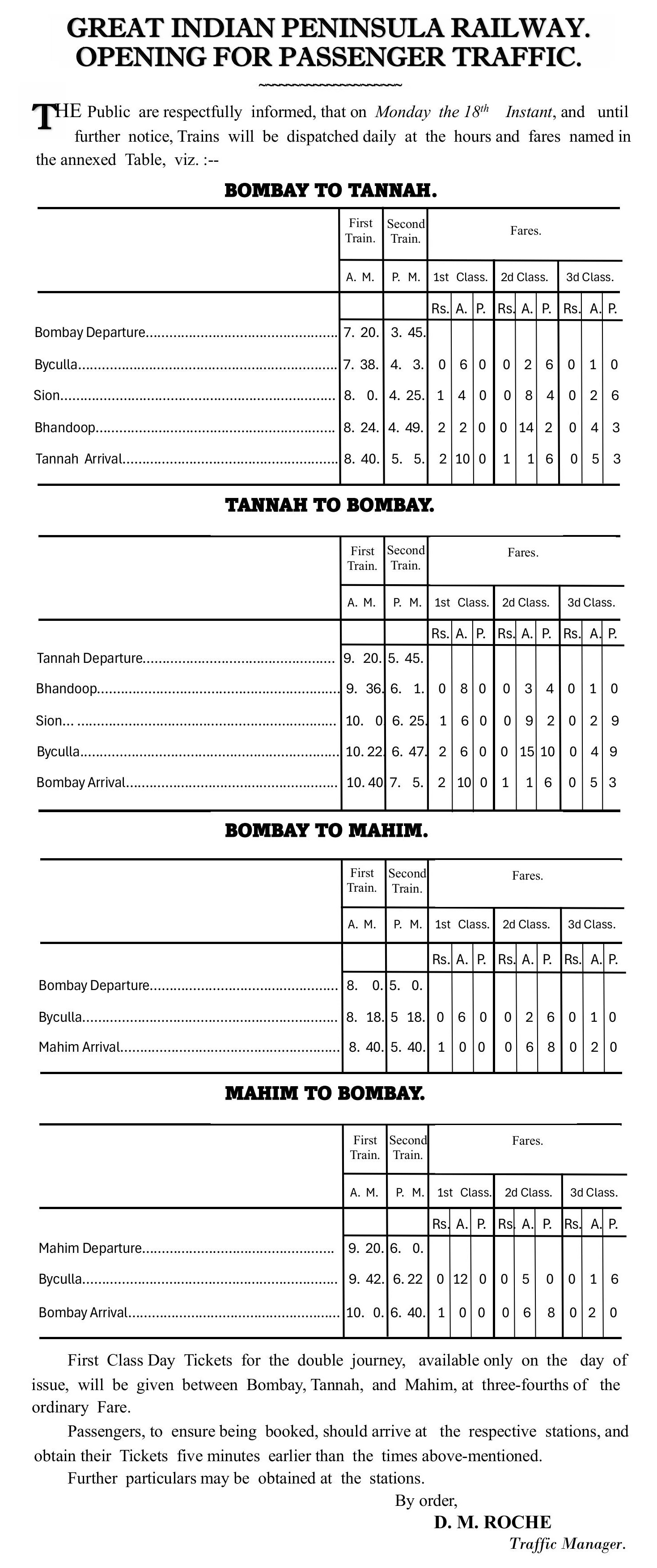
An early GIPR Timetable, as published in The Bombay Times and Journal of Commerce, 8-4-1853

The official day of inauguration was nothing short of a grand celebration, with the day (16 April 1853) being declared a public holiday. The whole journey was planned to cover the 21 miles (34 km) between the Bori Bunder station to Tannah, and the ceremony took place at the starting point at the 19-acre site of the Bori Bunder station. For the occasion, the platform was neatly matted, and was screened on the western side by a white screen, against the rays of the sun, and the high north wind that was blowing the afternoon, carrying immense clouds of dust. The platform was also decorated by flags and cloths of various colours. There were 18 flags in the front of the platform, as reported by The Bombay Gazette with the prominent among them being the St. George's ensign, later displaced by the Union Jack.

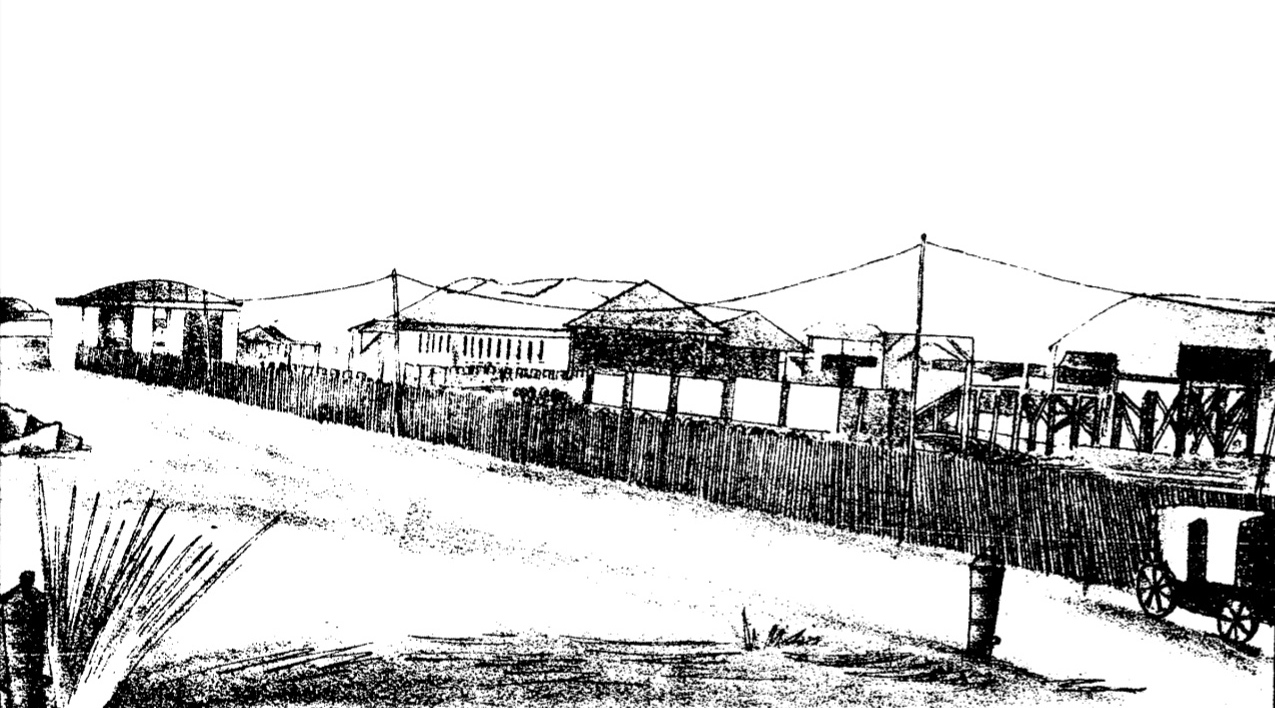
The Bori Bunder station, circa 1854

At 2 p.m. that afternoon, the invitees started to assemble at the terminus, and by 3 p.m. the invited Europeans and Natives were crowded on the platform. Captain Barr, and Mr. Roche, the Traffic Manager were the Masters of the Ceremony. At about 3 p.m., they started allotting places to the ladies, after which, the men were asked to find their accommodations, so that by 3:15 p.m., few could be found on the platform. One of the passengers on board, was the wife of Bombay's then governor (Lord Falkland), Lady Amelia Falkland.

At 3:30 p.m., amidst a thunderous applause, a 21 gun salute was fired from the ramparts of the nearby Fort George, following which, the Governor's Band, which occupied one of the train's carriages, began playing the National Anthem, followed by railway polka and other airs. At 3:35 p.m., the train carrying about 400 passengers, commenced its maiden official journey to Thane.

The train further stopped at Byculla, Sion, and Bhandup, finally stopping at Thane. Ahead of Sion, the engine's water reserve was filled up, and its new wheels were greased.

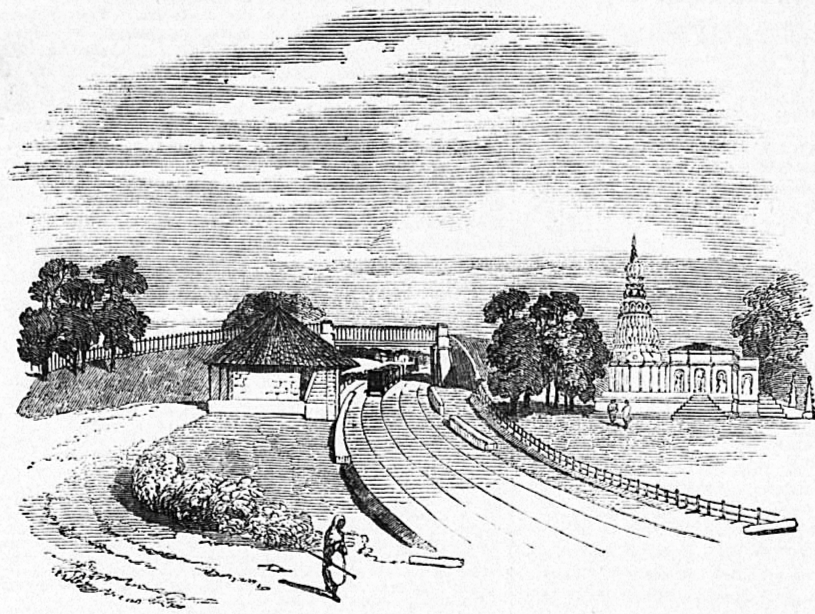
Byculla station, 1853

The journey was completed in 57 minutes, though the trial run conducted the previous year on 18 November 1852 took only 45 mins. Tens of thousands of 'natives' crowded around to witness the grand event; people climbed walls, branches of trees, and the masts of Arab Bungalows, windows, tops of temples and houses. In fact, when the train approached Thane, people crowded on the sides thickly for more than a mile, and had to be kept in control by the Ghat police.

After arriving at Thane, the attendees were provided with an immense tent, for a "cool retreat", and a "splendid tiffin". There were then held speeches by the 'gentlemen', with the Chief Engineer James John Berkley too providing his own. In that speech, he celebrated the event, and praised all those who made the project possible, with a special mention to the native workers, whom he praised to have exceeded expectations, and appreciating the docility, endurance and discipline of the native troops. The ceremony then ended around 6 p.m. that day. The train left for Bombay at half past six, and reached Bori Bunder with a journey time of 55 minutes. Even on the return trip, the sides of the railway from the Byculla Flats was lined with spectators, cheering loudly as the train passed.

== Railways around Bombay ==
Tanna railway viaducts
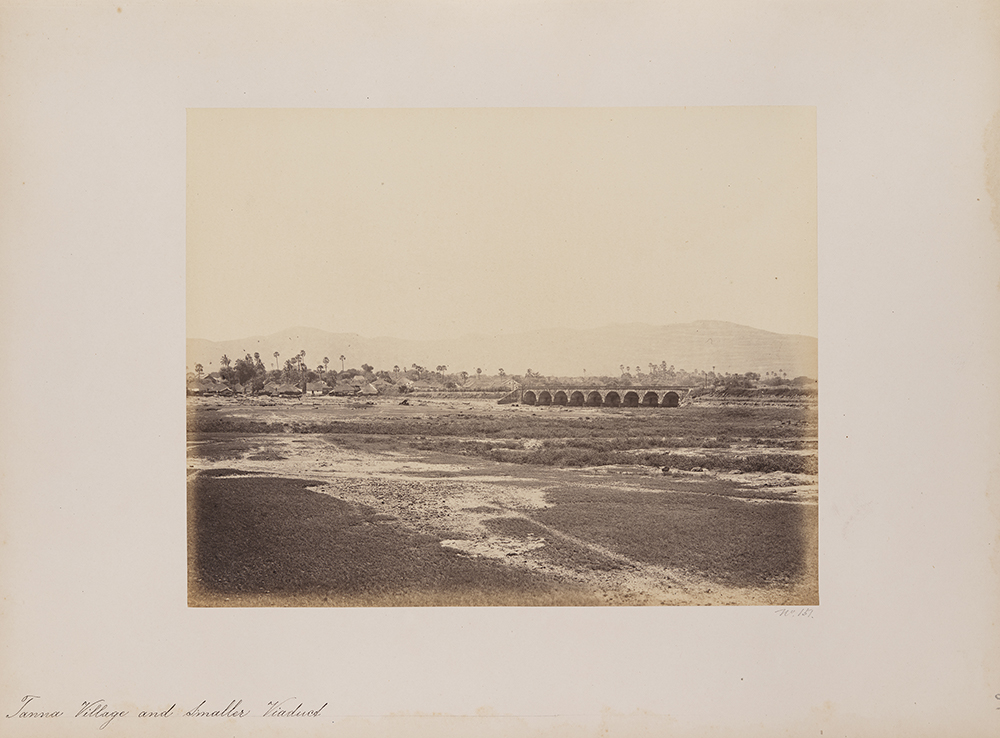
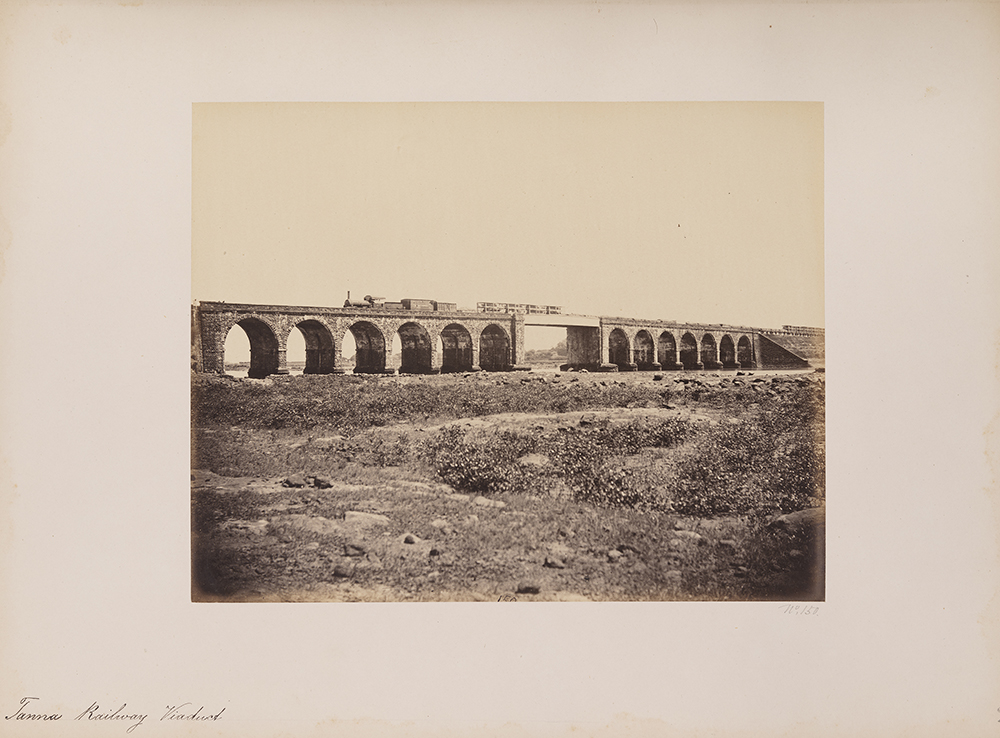
The smaller railway viaduct (top) and the longer railway viaduct (bottom) near Tanna (present day Thane) in 1855.

Starting from 18th April 1853, regular services commenced on the line. The timetable published in The Bombay Times of 8th April 1853 (see above section for image) suggests that the line began with two services each way per day. While the mainline went upto Tannah, there was a branch line to Mahim, that diverged from the mainline after Byculla.

The portion of the line from Tanna to Callian (present day Kalyan) was opened on 1 May 1854. The construction of this portion was difficult as it involved two-line viaducts over the estuary (see picture on right) and two tunnels.

On 12 May 1856 the line was extended to Campoolie (present day Khopoli) via Padusdhurree (present day Palasdhari) and on 14 June 1858 Khandala-Poona (present day Pune) section was opened to traffic. The Padusdhurree-Khandala section involved the difficult crossing of the Bhore Ghat (present day Bhor Ghat) and it took another five years for completion. During this period, the 21 km gap was covered by palanquin, pony or cart through the village of Campoolie.

The Kassarah (present day Kasara) line was opened on 1 January 1861 and the steep Thull ghat (present day Thal Ghat) section up to Egutpoora (present day Igatpuri) was opened on 1 January 1865 and thus completed the crossing of the Sahyadri.

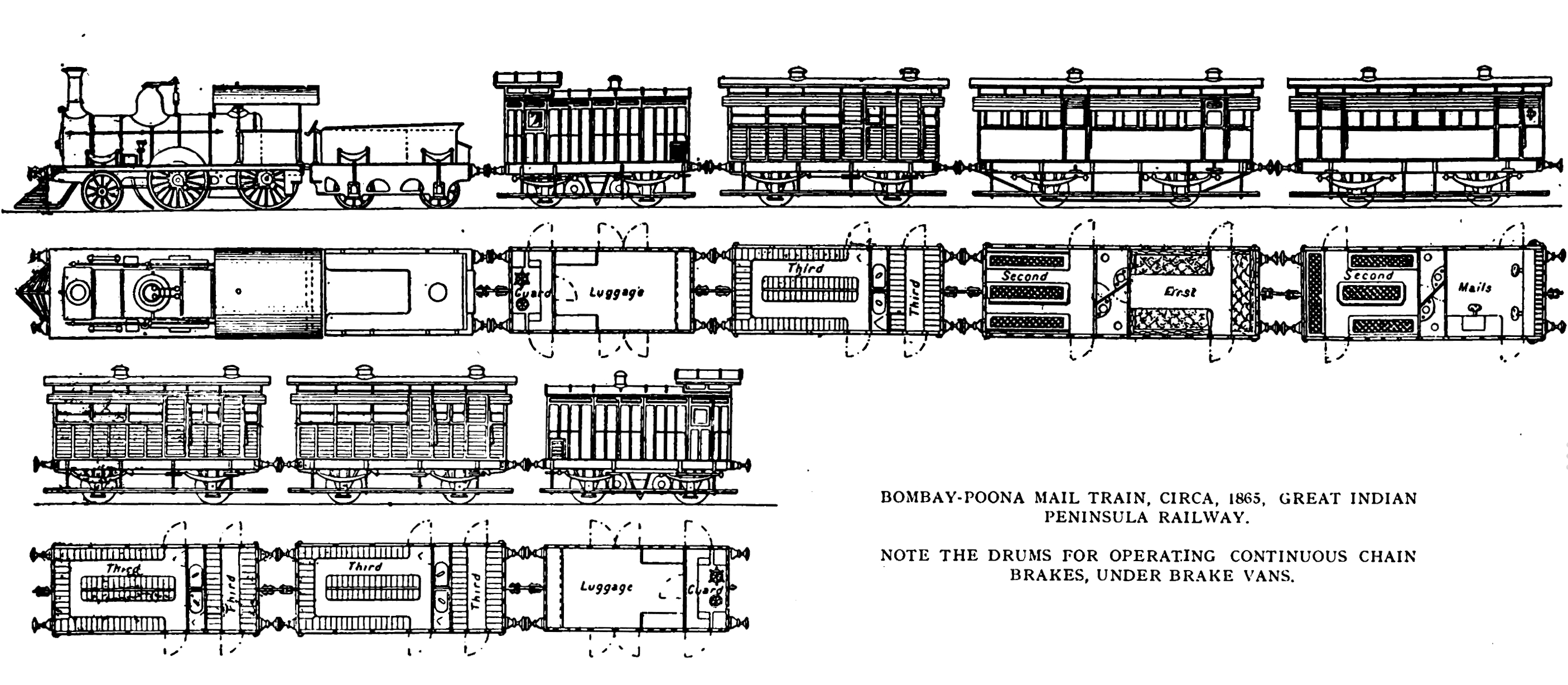
Composition of the Bombay-Poona Mail train, circa 1865

== Bombay to Madras ==
Beyond Callian, the south-east main line proceeded over Bhor Ghat to Poona, Sholapore (present day Solapur) and Raichore (present day Raichur), where it joined the Madras Railway. By 1868, route kilometerage was 888 km and by 1870, route kilometerage was 2,388.

== Bombay to Calcutta ==
Beyond Callian (present day Kalyan), the north-east main line proceeded over the Thull ghat to Bhosawal (present day Bhusawal). From Bhosawal, there was a bifurcation. One passed through great cotton districts of Akola (West Berar) and Oomravuttee (present day Amravati) and was extended up to Nagpore (present day Nagpur) and then to Raj-nandgaon in Drug district (Present day Durg). The other was extended up to Jubbulpore (present day Jabalpur) to connect with the Allahabad-Jubbulpore branch line of the East Indian Railway which had been opened in June 1867. Hence it became possible to travel directly from Bombay to Calcutta.

The Howrah-Allahabad-Mumbai line was officially opened on 7 March 1870 and it was part of the inspiration for French writer Jules Verne's book Around the World in Eighty Days. Although, in the novel it is erroneously claimed that the line passes through Aurangabad (which is, again erroneously claimed as the capital of the Emperor Aurangzeb). At that time period, line had not reached Aurangabad but rather moved northward after reaching Bhusawal towards Jabalpur. At the opening ceremony, the Viceroy Lord Mayo concluded that "it was thought desirable that, if possible, at the earliest possible moment, the whole country should be covered with a network of lines in a uniform system".

== Electrification ==
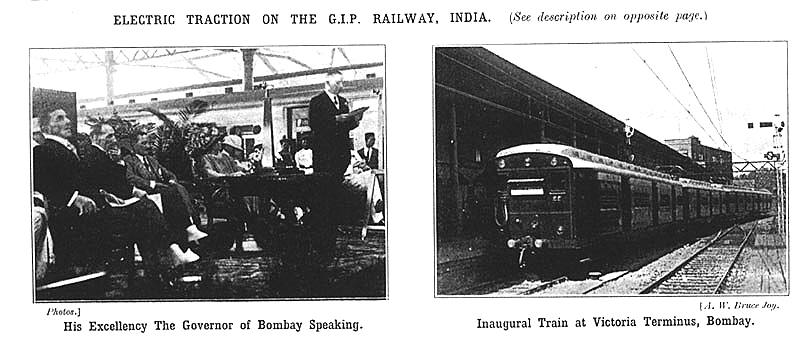
Newspaper photographs reporting the opening of the electrified line in February 1925

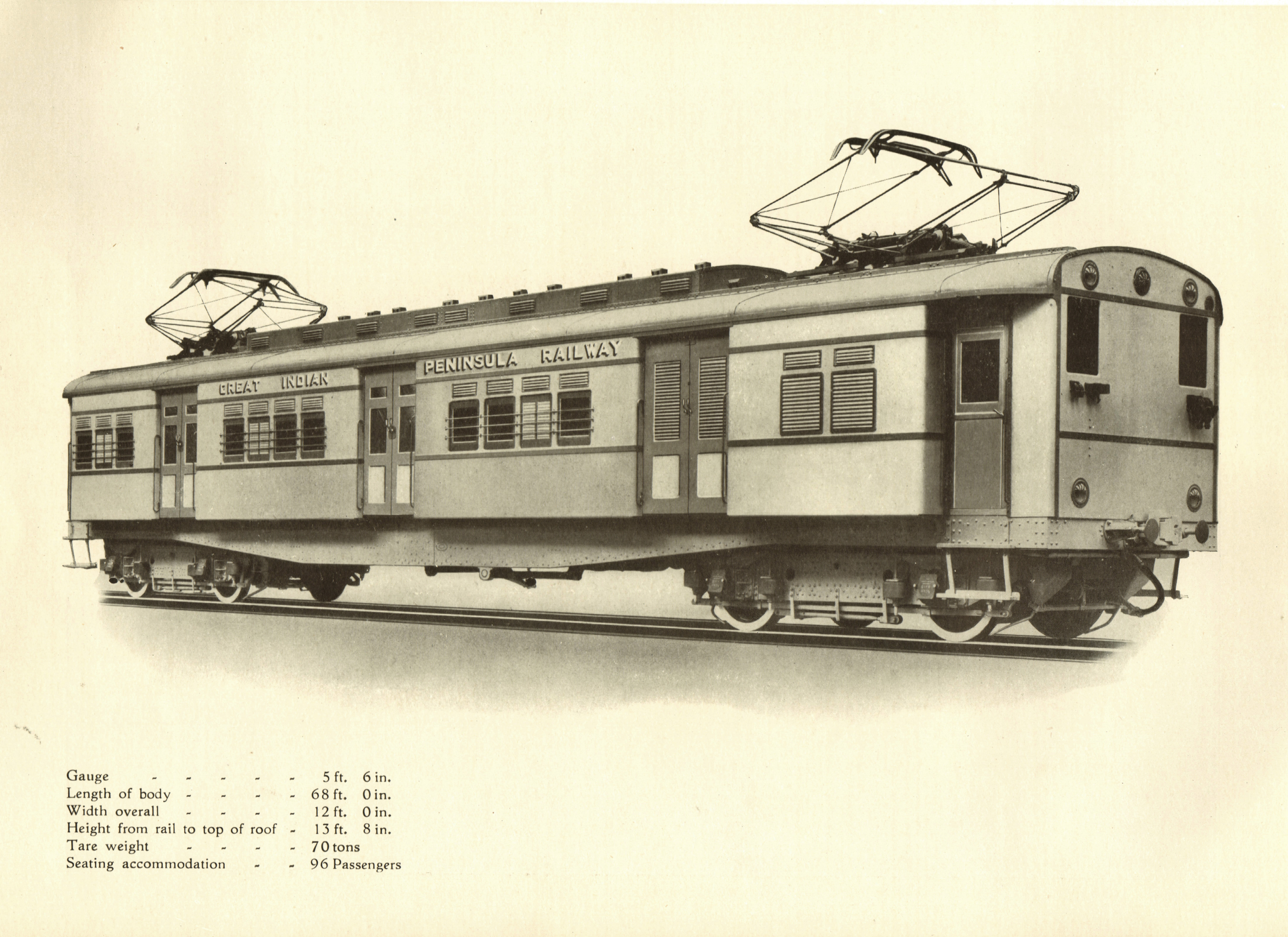
Electric Great Peninsular Railway coach Design

The Harbour (Branch) line of the GIPR was the first passenger railway line to be electrified in India. The first train on this section ran on 3 February 1925 between Bombay's Victoria Terminus and Kurla, a distance of 16 km. The ceremony was attended by Bombay's governor, Sir Leslie Orme Wilson and his wife. The inauguration was held on Platform no.2 of Victoria Terminus. The line was opened to traffic after Sir L. Wilson signaled to the power station at Wadi Bunder to connect the conductor wire into the circuit. The route included the elevated corridor at Sandhurst Rd, on the way to Kurla.

== Rolling stock ==
By the end of 1874 the company owned 345 steam locomotives, 1,309 coaches and 7,924 goods wagons. In 1906 a steam railcar from Kerr, Stuart and Company was purchased. By 1936, the rolling stock had increased to 835 locomotives, 1,285 coaches and more than 20,000 freight wagons.

== Classification ==
It was labeled as a Class I railway according to Indian Railway Classification System of 1926.

== See also ==
- List of earliest GIPR Locomotives
- List of railway companies in India
- Nizam's Guaranteed State Railway
