= GIP-2 to 9 =

GIPR 2 to 9
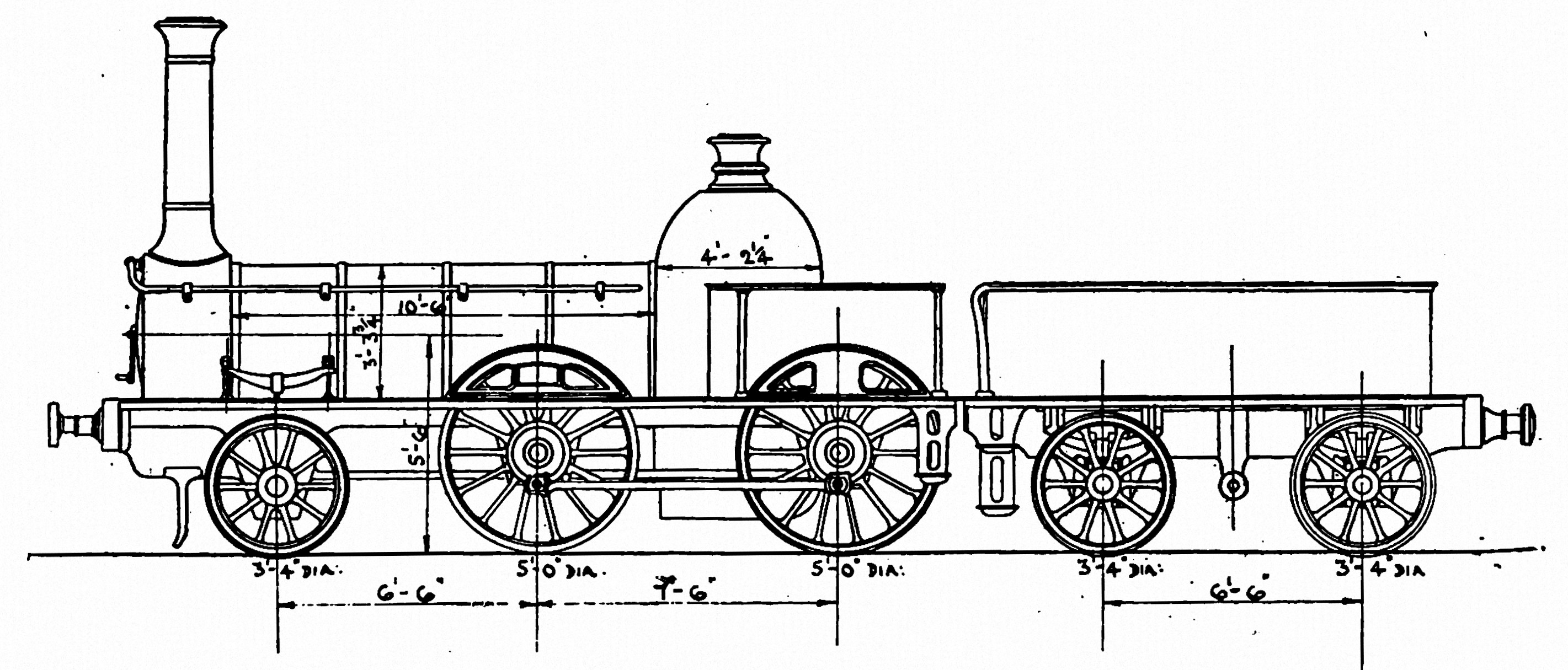
Type and origin
- Power type: Steam
- Builder: Vulcan Foundry
- Serial number: 324–331
- Build date: 1851
- Total produced: 8
Specifications
- Configuration
  - Whyte: 2-4-0
- Gauge: 1,676 mm (5 ft 6 in)
- Driver dia.: 5 ft 0 in (1.524 m)
- Water cap.: 600 gal (2271.25 L)
- Firebox
  - Grate area: 13.5 sq ft (1.25 m^{2})
- Boiler pressure: 120 psi (827.371 kPa)
- Heating surface: 777.25 sq ft (72.21 m^{2})
- Cylinders: Two, inside
- Cylinder size: 13 in × 20 in (330 mm × 508 mm)
Career
- Operators: Great Indian Peninsula Railway
- Numbers: 2 to 9
- Disposition: Unknown

The GIP-2 to 9 were 8 locomotives produced by Vulcan Foundry in 1851, to operate on the Great Indian Peninsula Railway's line from Bombay to Tannah (now Thane). Three of these would reportedly pull India's first Train from Bori Bunder to Tannah on 16 April 1853.

The 2-4-0 type tender locomotives were ordered by the GIPR to operate on the first railway line in India. The Vulcan Foundry rotation numbers of these were from 324-331, while the working numbers were 680-687. The locomotives had 5' diameter driving wheels, 3' 4" diameter leading wheels. They had a water capacity of 800 gallons (3028.33 Litres), and a tender capacity of 600 gallons (2271.25 Litres). They had 5 feet diameter driving wheels, a firegrate area of 13.5 sq.ft (1.253 sq.m) and a heating surface of 777.25 sq.ft (72.2088 sq.m). The barrel of the boiler was 10' 6" long, and had a diameter of 3' 3¾". The tender ran on four wheels, having the same diameter as the leading wheels, and spaced 6' 6" apart.

Three locomotives arrived at Bombay on the ship Charles in September 1852, along with carriages and six European drivers accompanying them. Since the locomotives were still in the process of being made ready in November that year, the trial journey conducted on 18 November 1852, was pulled by the E.B.Wilson manufactured Lord Falkland shunting Locomotive. They were expected to be made ready by February 1853.

Three of this series of locomotives were used to haul the first passenger train in India. Together they pulled the 14 carriage train from Bori Bunder to Tannah (now Thane) on 16 April 1853.

Of this series, Nos. 2 and 8 were sold to the Bombay Baroda and Central India Railway, where they were converted to tank engines for construction purposes. Nos. 3,4,6, and 9 were used as stationary engines in workshops. Out of these, the one believed to be the No.3, was driving a rolling mill at the Parel Workshops in 1916, that was used during the war for converting old steel tyres to spring plate bars. No. 5 was sold to the Viegas Slip Co., that had a contract at Mormugao in Portuguese India, and was found working as a stationary engine as late as 1906, where it was driving a sawmill at the railway depot or the West of India Portuguese Railway. No.7 was sold to one Ebrahim Dadur.

== Gallery ==
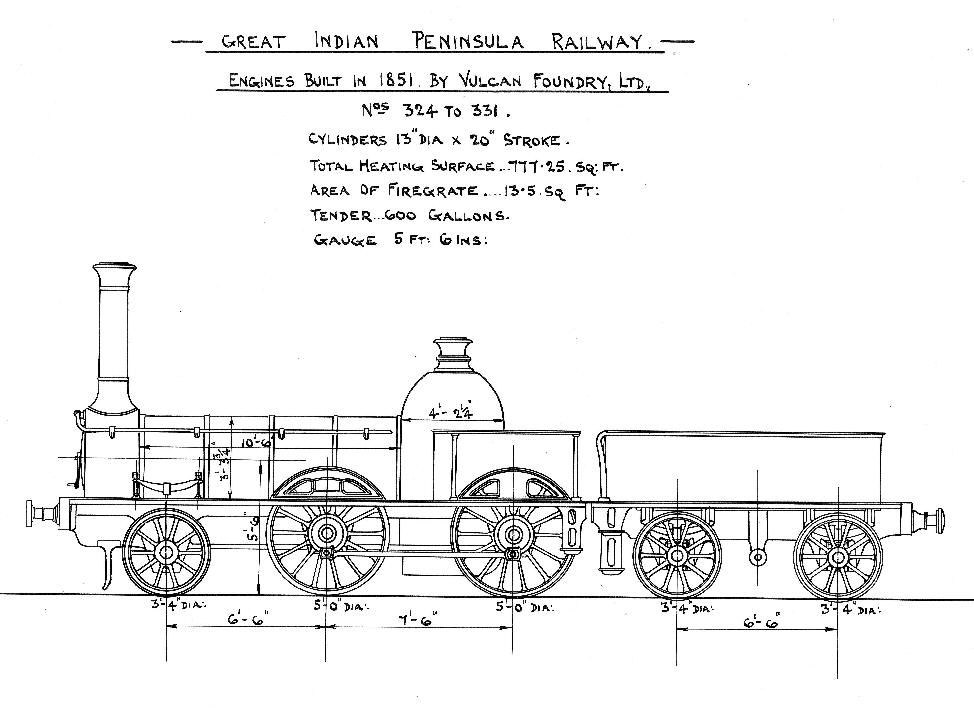
Blueprint of GIP Locomotives no.2-9

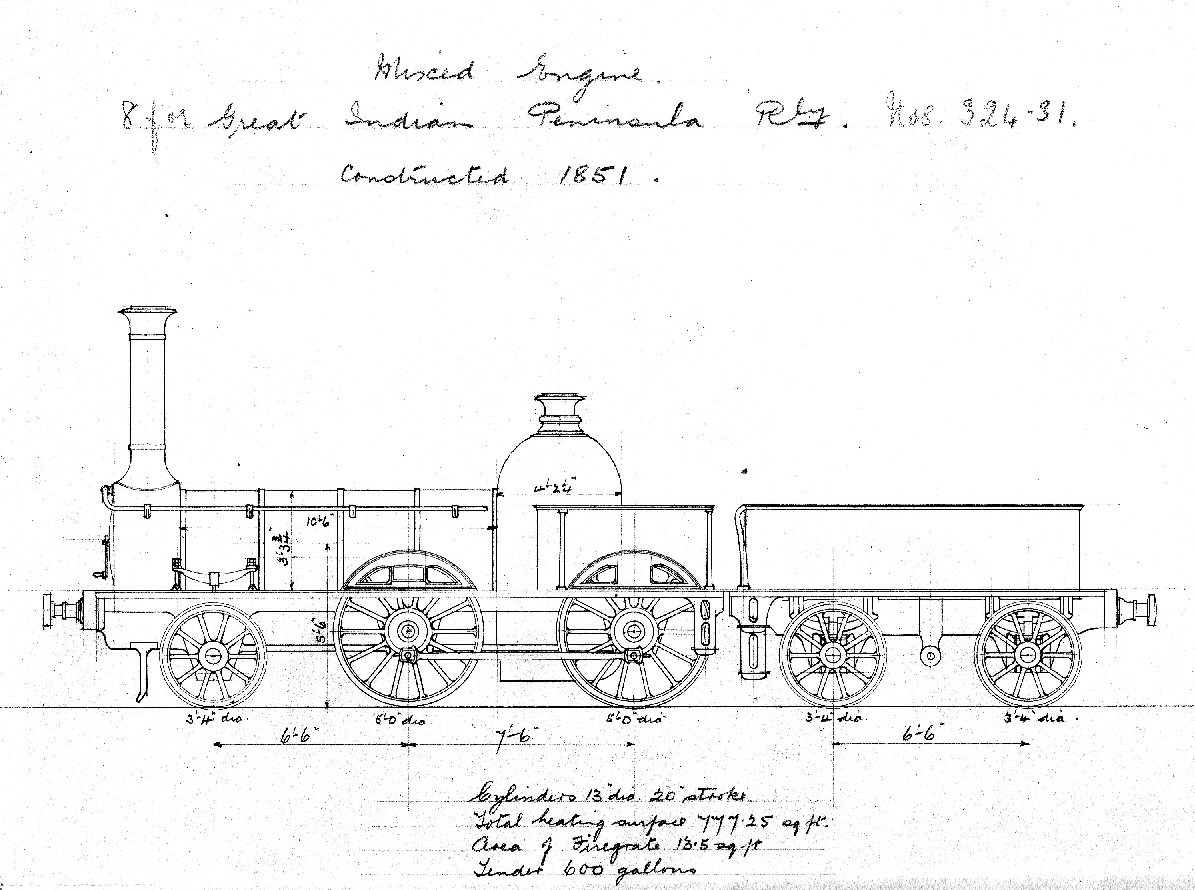
Blueprint of GIP 2-9 class, with handwritten notes

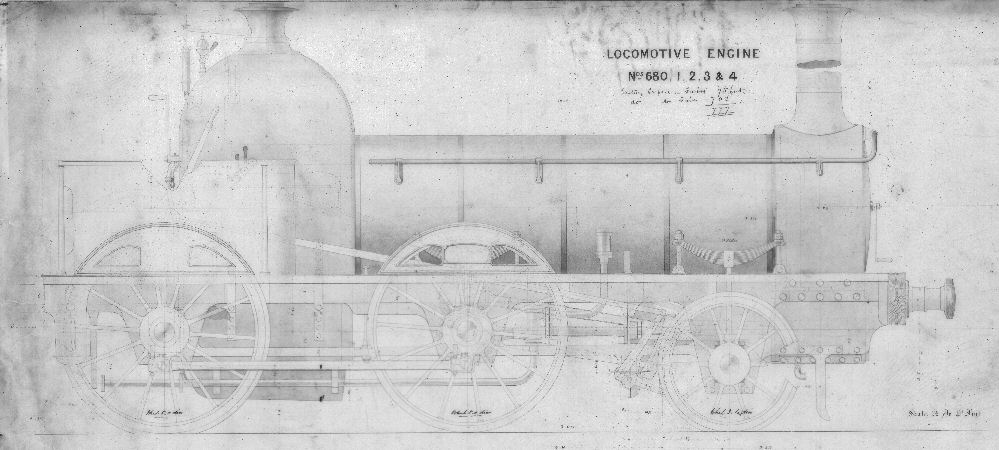
Sketch of GIP 2-9 class

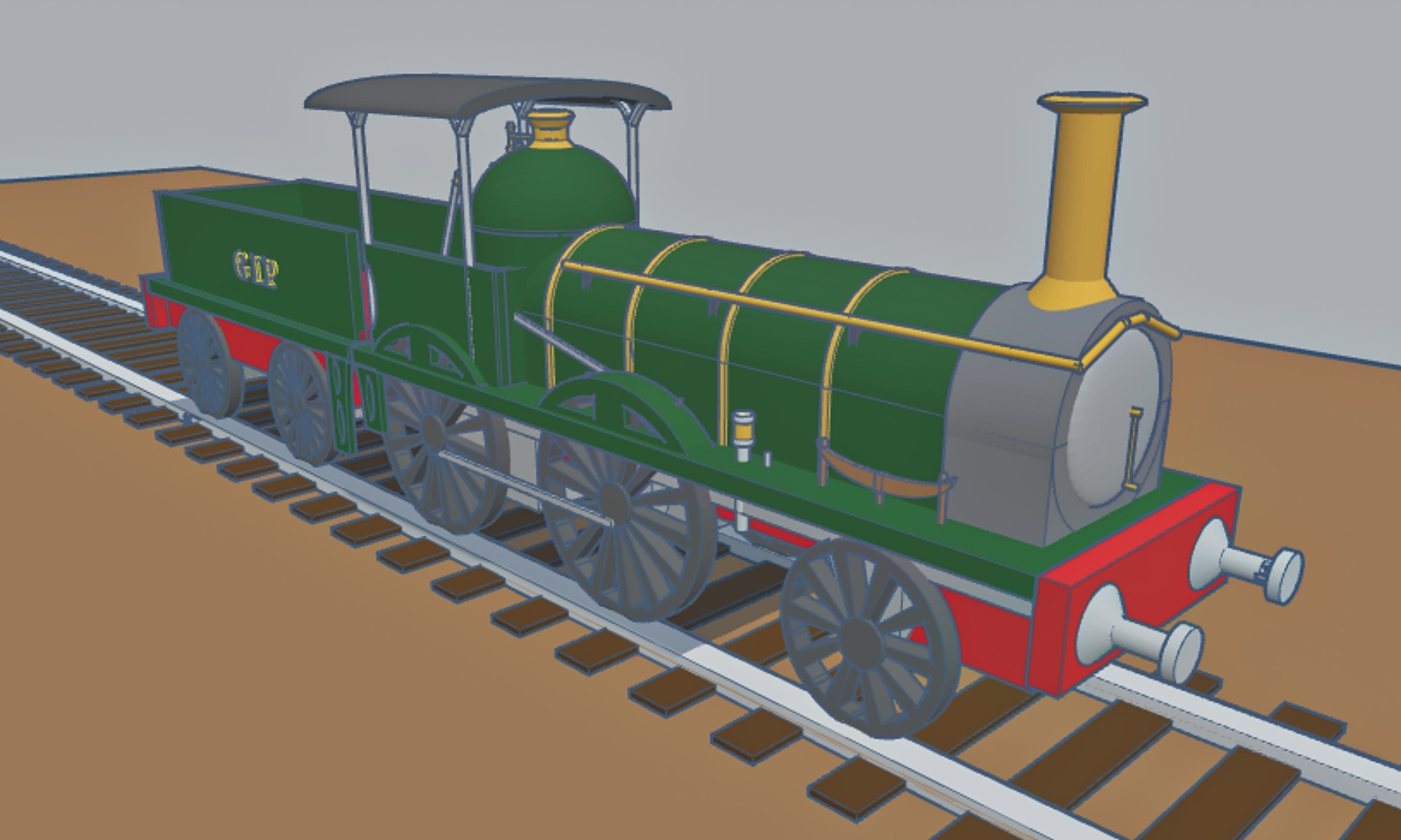
An oblique view of the Locomotive class

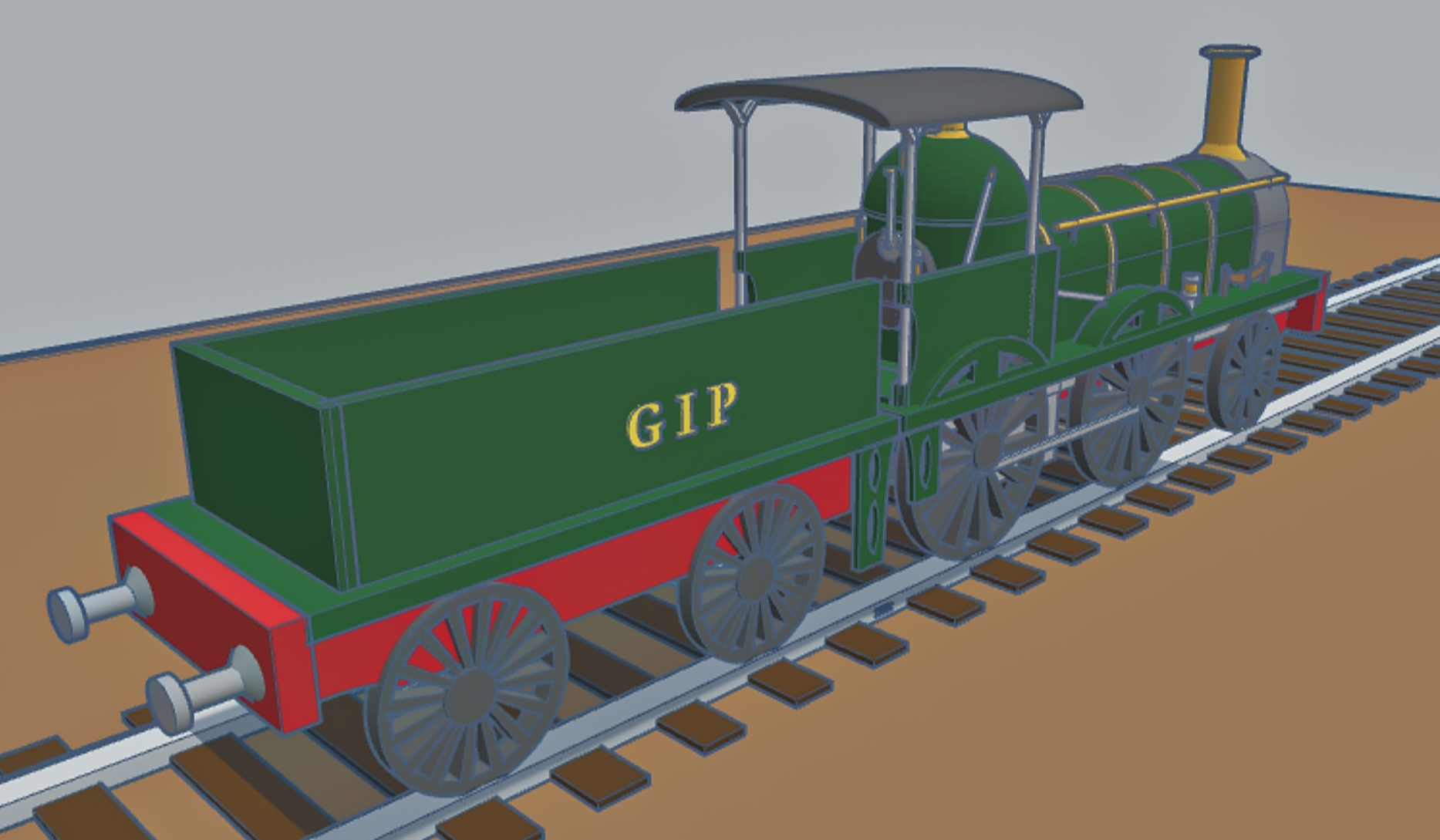
A Rear view of the Locomotive Class

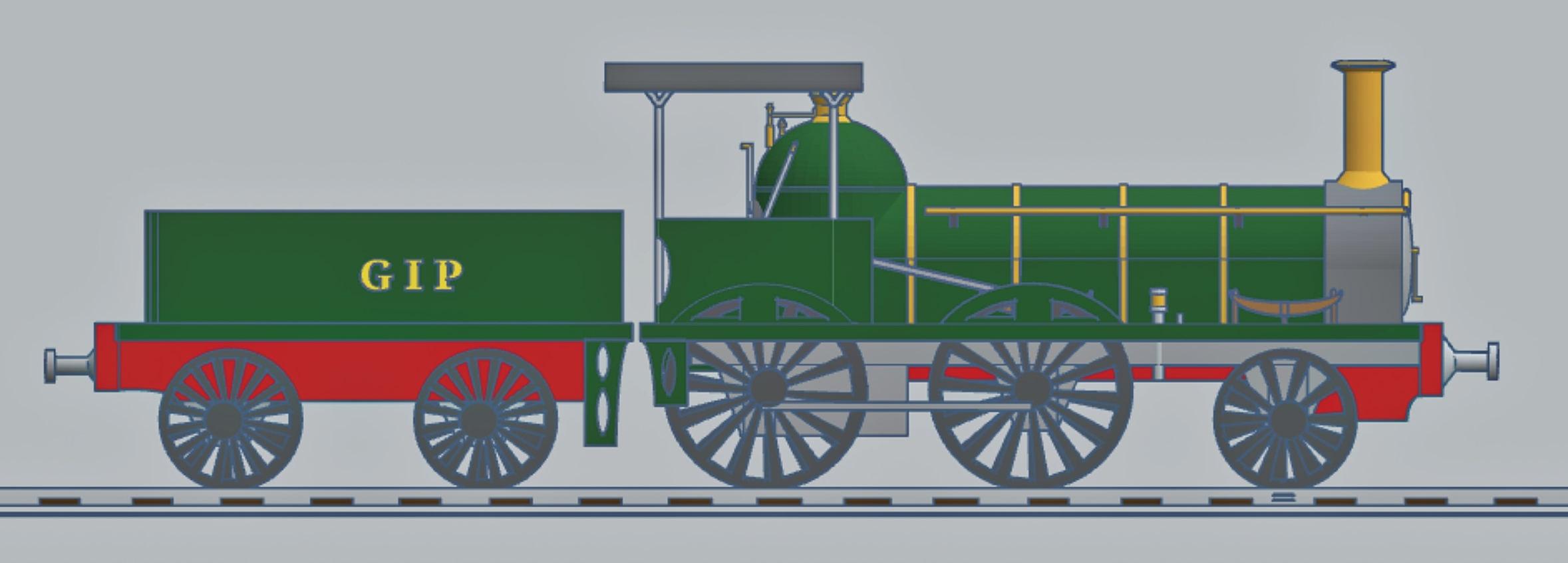
A Side view of the Locomotive (without valve gear details)

== See Also ==
- List of earliest GIPR locomotives
- Lord Falkland (locomotive)
