= List of earliest GIPR locomotives =

This is a list of the earliest locomotives of the Great Indian Peninsula Railway. The railway received its first locomotive, the E. B. Wilson built Lord Falkland shunting engine, when it arrived at Bombay in February 1852. The locomotive series that pulled the first train from Bombay Bori Bunder to Tannah was manufactured by the Vulcan Foundry Ltd, and the first few locomotives of the class were delivered in September 1852. The list contains brief information about the first 165 locomotives of the said railway, except the Nos.114-119.

== Lord Falkland ==
Named after the then Governor of Bombay, Lucius Cary, the 10th Viscount Falkland, the locomotive, said to be a E. B. Wilson creation, was presumably a 0-6-0 tank locomotive. It arrived at wood yard at Mazgaon, Bombay on 6 February 1852. From there it was pulled to its shed on a public road by 200 coolies. The first trip was conducted between Byculla and Parel on 23 February 1852. It became a popular spectacle among the native folks, who would crowd around the locomotive during its operations. Its most notable use is when it hauled the first inspection special train between Bombay And Tannah, on 18 November 1852. The Directors, Engineers and their friends made their journey on board, and had a tiffin at a tunnel at Parsick (no relation to present Parsik tunnel) It has been suggested that this locomotive was the Locomotive No. 1 of the GIPR.

== Nos. 2–9 ==
Locomotives No. 2-9 were 8 mixed type locomotives built by the Vulcan Foundry, in 1851. The first three arrived at Bombay, aboard the ship, Charles along with carriages and six European drivers in September 1852. Three of this series would pull the first commercial passenger train of India from Bori Bunder to Tannah on 16 April 1853. These were 2-4-0 tender locomotives with 5 ft driving wheels. Of this series, Nos. 2 and 8 were sold to the Bombay Baroda and Central India Railway, where they were converted to tank engines for construction purposes. Nos. 3,4,6, and 9 were used as stationary engines in workshops. Out of these, the one believed to be the No.3, was driving a rolling mill at the Parel Workshops in 1916, that was used during the war for converting old steel tyres to spring plate bars. No. 5 was sold to the Viegas Slip Co., that had a contract at Mormugao in Portuguese India, and was found working as a stationary engine as late as 1906, where it was driving a sawmill at the railway depot or the West of India Portuguese Railway. No.7 was sold to one Ebrahim Dadur.

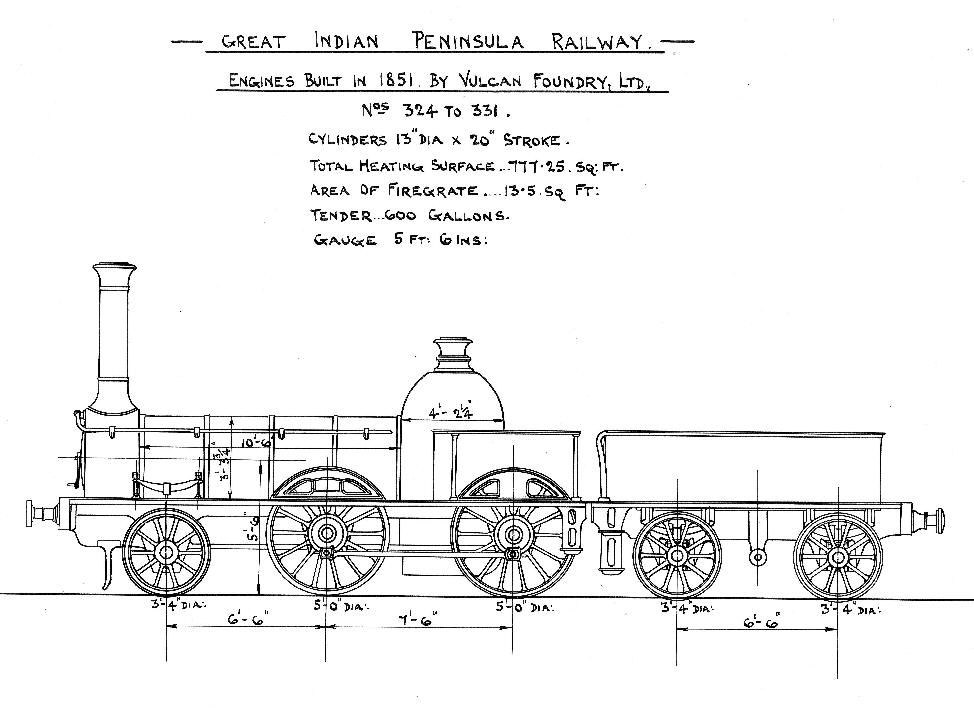
Blueprint of GIPR Locomotives no.2-9

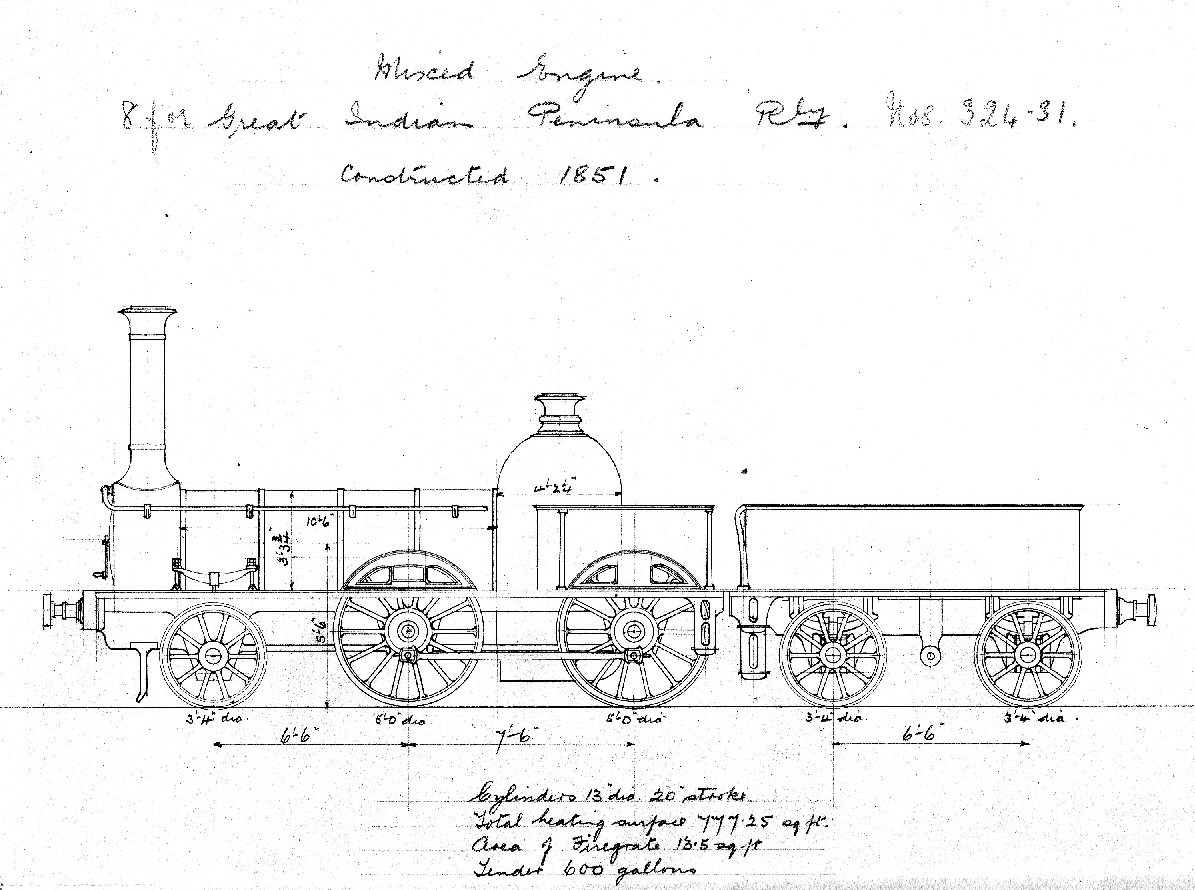
Blueprint of GIPR 2-9 class, with handwritten notes

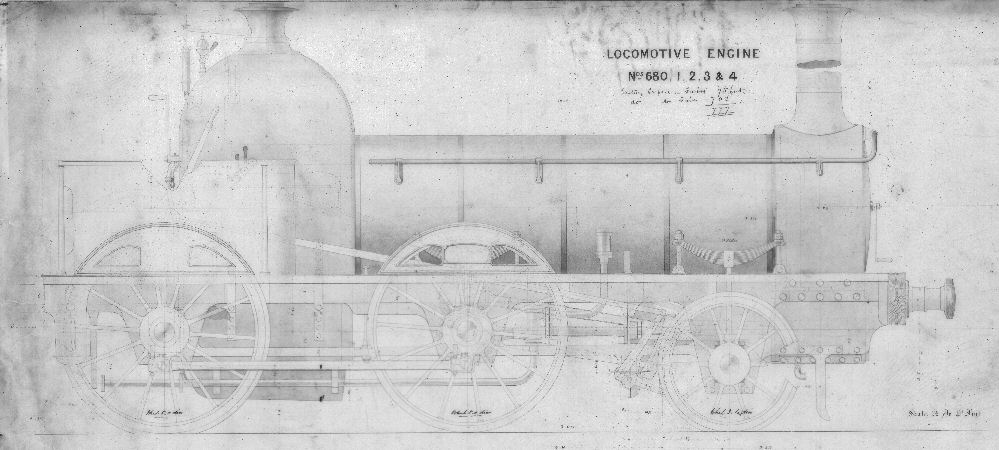
Sketch of GIPR Locomotives 2-9

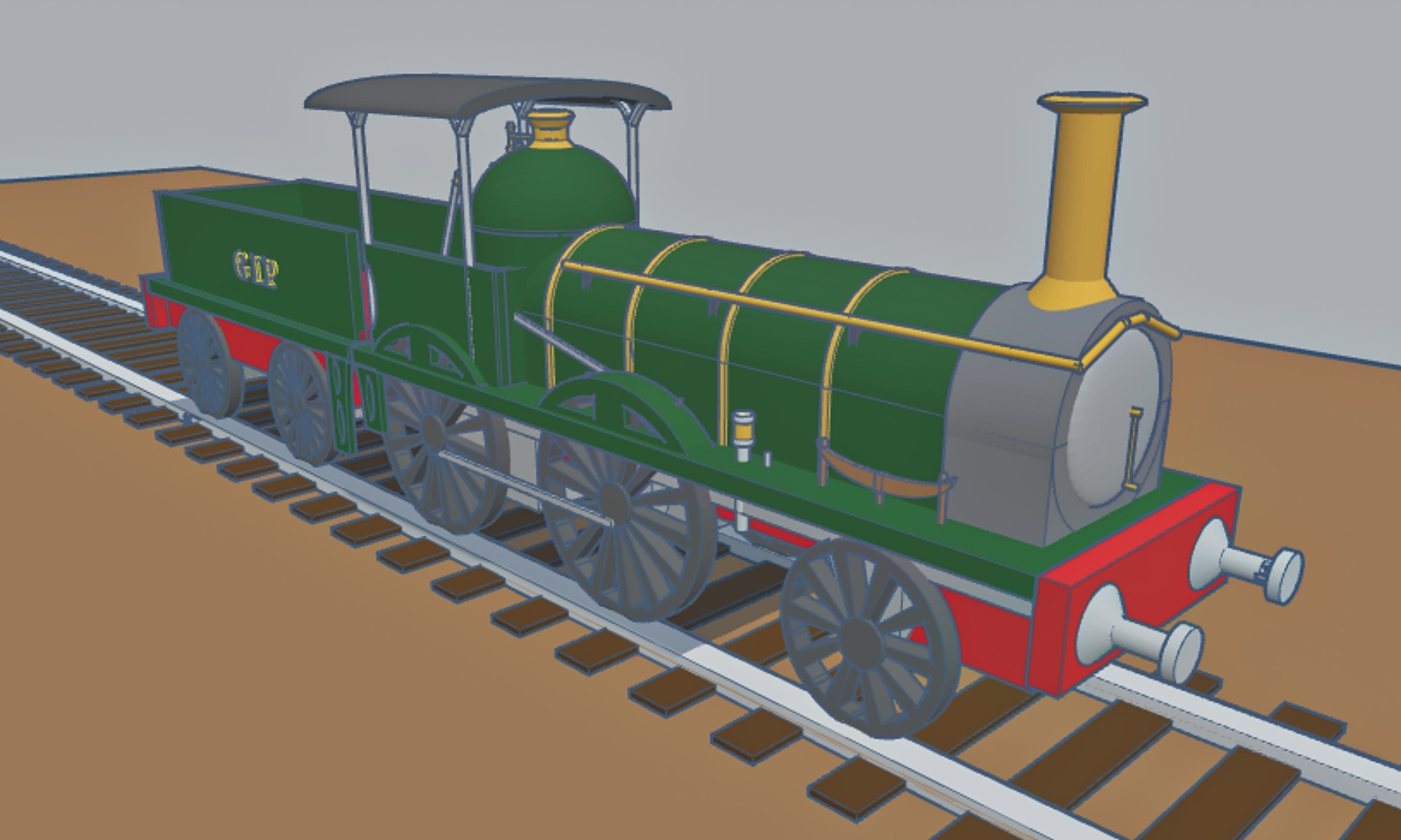
An oblique view of the Locomotive class

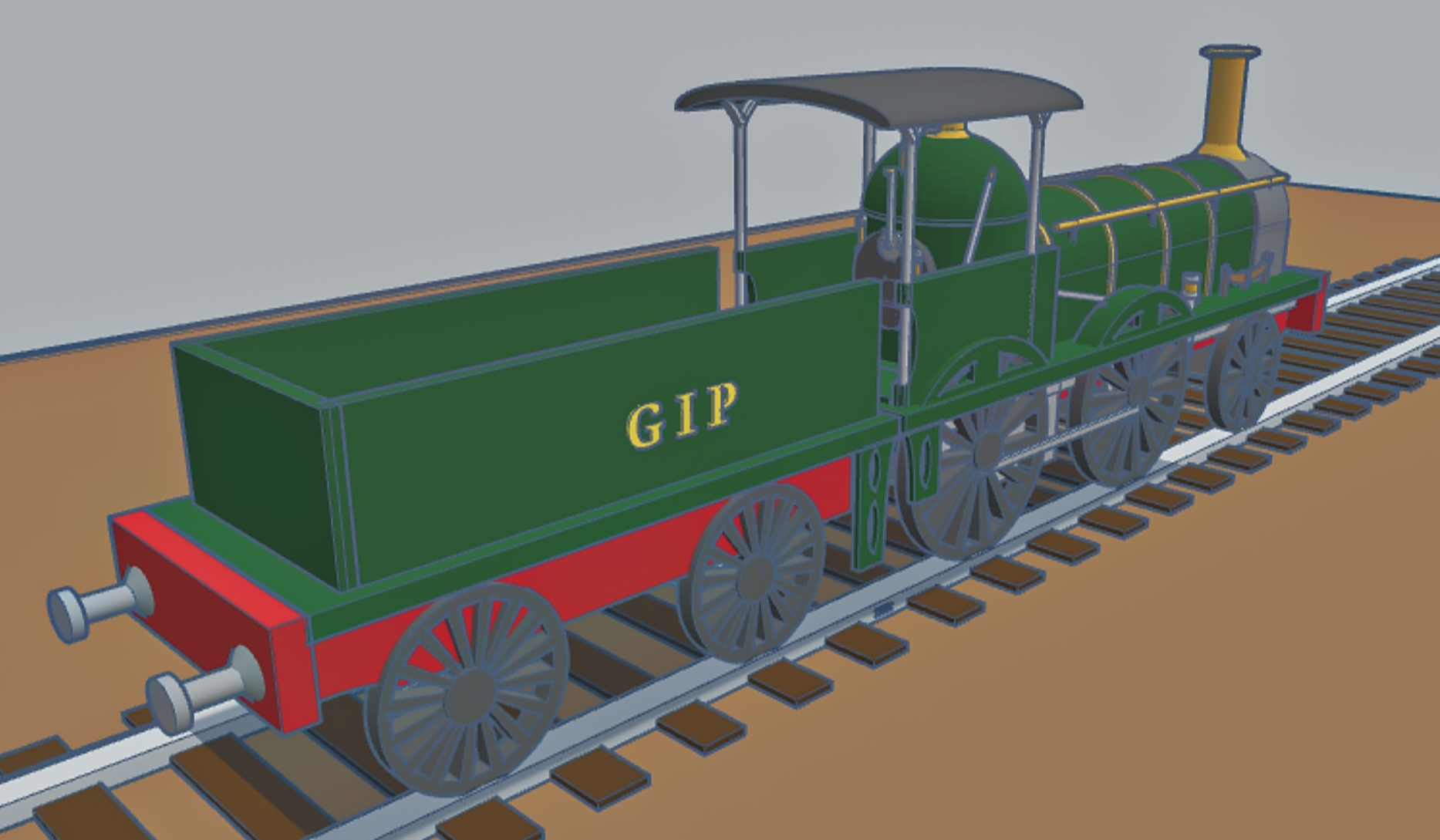
A Rear view of the Locomotive Class

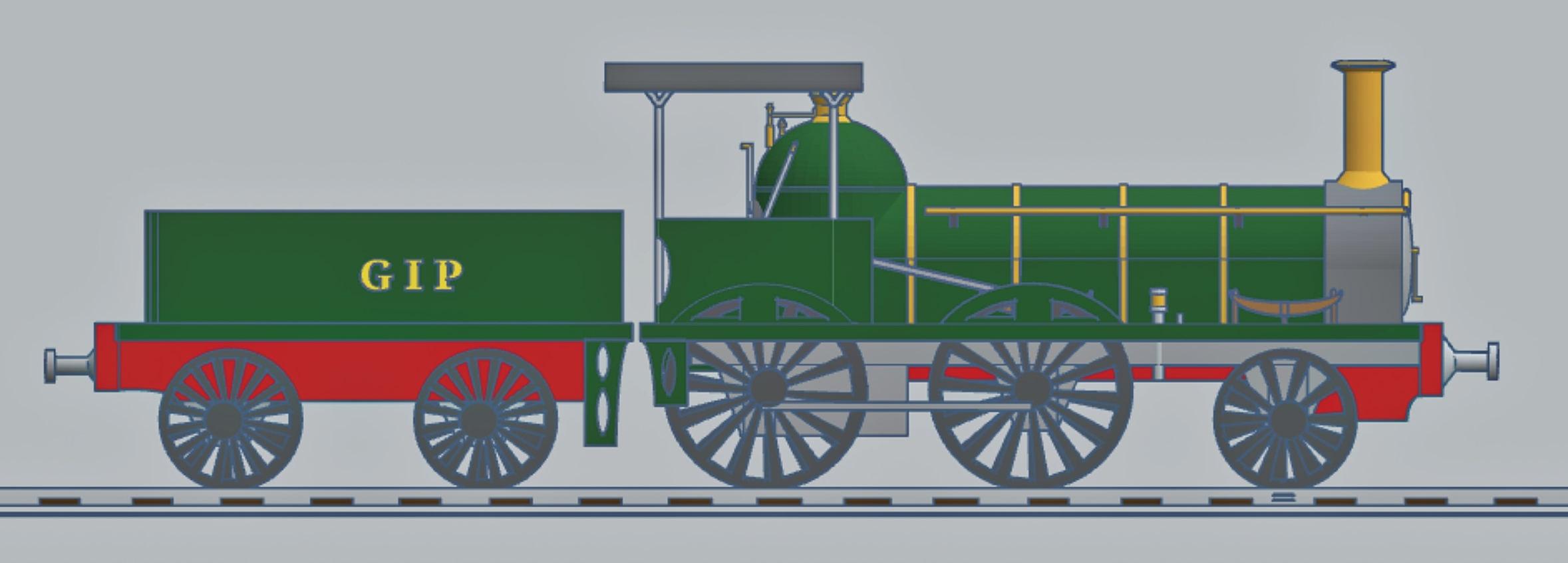
A Side view of the Locomotive (without valve gear details)

== Nos. 10 and 11 ==
These locomotives were manufactured by M/s Dodds of the Holmes Works, Rotherham. It has been suggested that these were the ones sent to Poona to work the Khandala-Poona line and returned to Bombay after the Bhor Ghat incline was completed. They were sold to the BB&CI Railway in 1862. The engines were noted to be of the 0-4-2 configuration and renumbered as Locomotives 31 and 32 on the BB&CIR line. These were used exclusively for construction work on the said line.

== Nos. 12–54 ==
These were 2-4-0 passenger tender locomotives manufactured by Kitson & Co.. These had 5'6'' driving wheels. The first eight of the series arrived in 1856, while the rest arrived by 1862. Some of these were reboilered between 1872 and 1878, with boiler manufactured at the Byculla Locomotive Works. Locomotive no. 39 was damaged after collision at Lonavla in August 1867, and was rebuilt at the Byculla Shops in 1873. Post this it was displayed at an exhibition at Bombay in 1874, and looked up as the first locomotive to be "built" in India by native labour. In its final years, it was named "Dadur" and used for Shunting at the Parel Shops. Locomotives no. 18, 22, 25, 27, 44 and 46 were sold to the Indian Midland Railway (IMR) in 1886. Locomotive no. 44 was used for shunting at the Jhansi shops of IMR in its later days, and named "Sindh". This locomotive was later preserved in front of the Locomotive Engineer's Offices at Parel, where it was placed on a pedestal. It was later sent to Delhi for the Railway Centenary Exhibition in 1953, after which it is presumed to be sold for scrap. Its name "Sindh" has resulted in the misconception that this was among the three locomotives that pulled the first train, which according to a popular theory were named Sindh, Sultan and Sahib. However this is impossible since the series itself arrived post 1855, and besides the "Sindh, Sultan and Sahib" claim is itself unverified (albeit popular), being mentioned in no historical reports and accounts.

The last engine of the series was withdrawn from Mainline service in 1886.

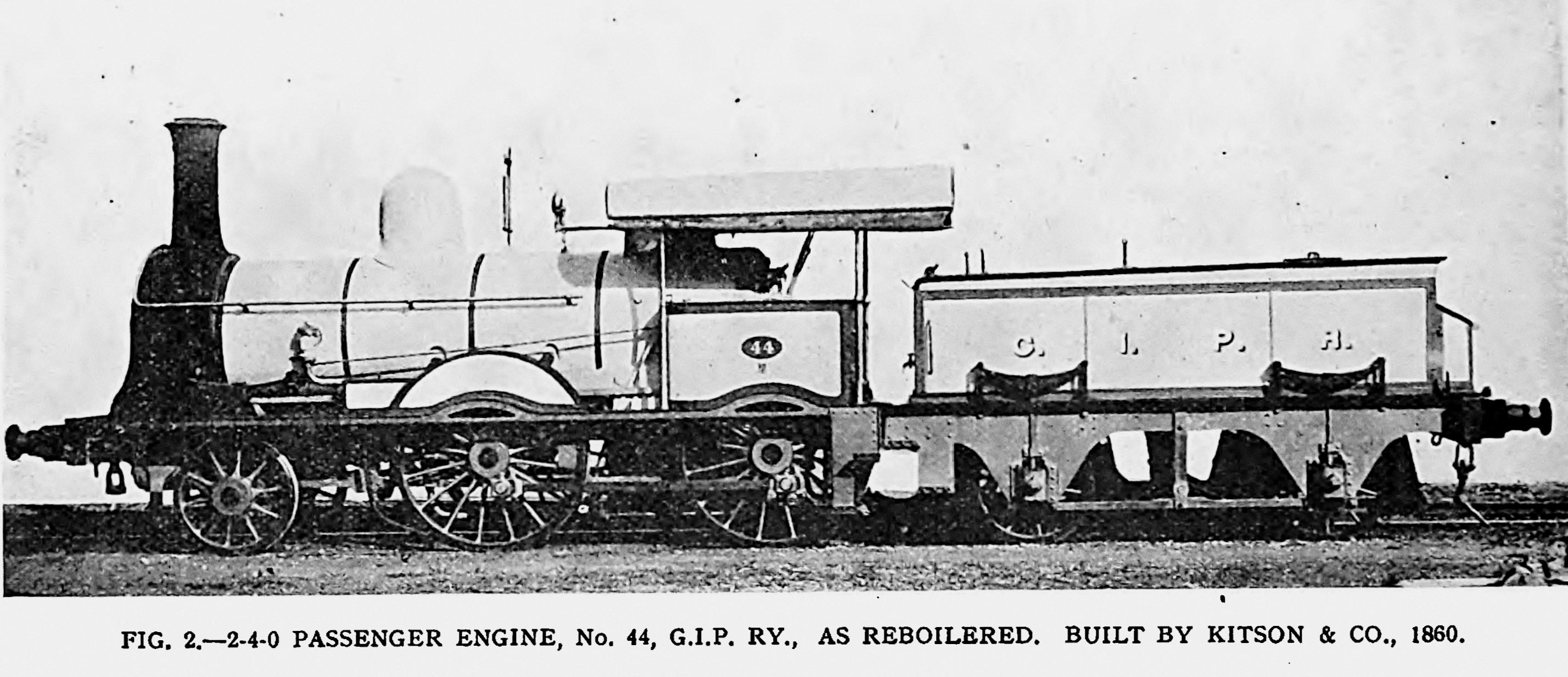
GIPR Locomotive no. 44, later named 'Sindh'

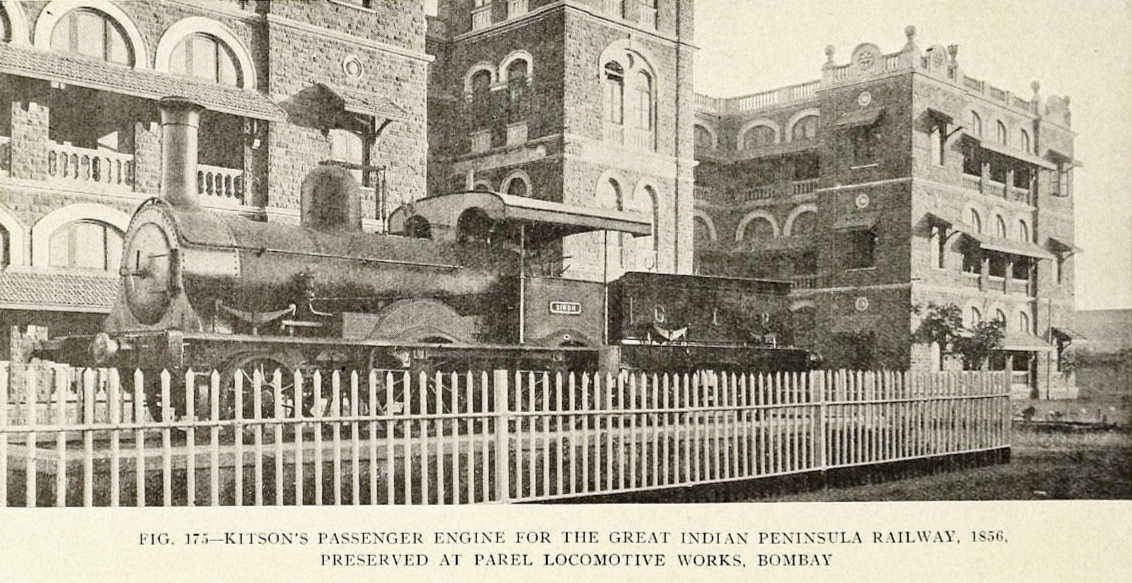
Locomotive 'Sindh' plinthed outside Parel Locomotive Works

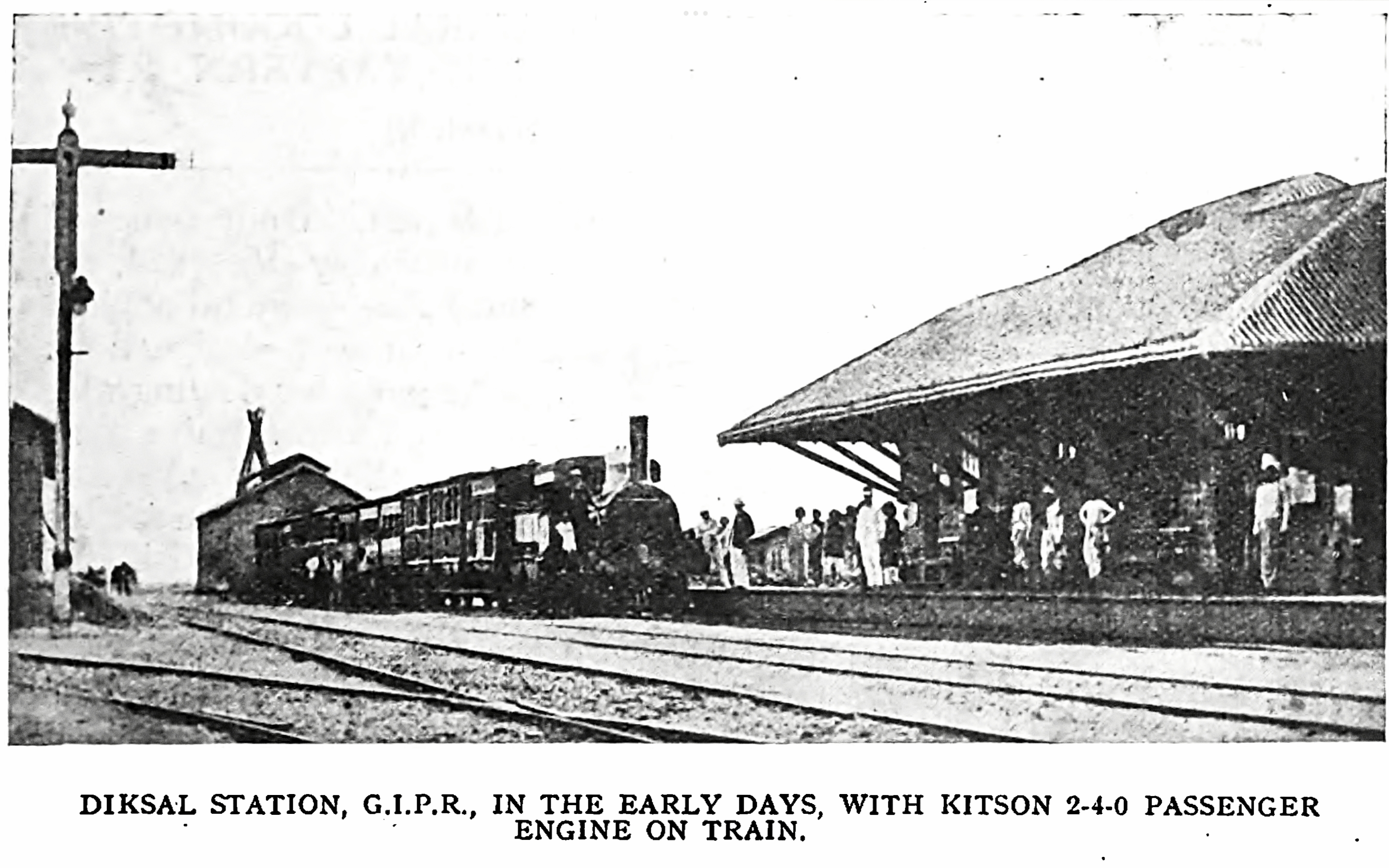
Reboilered Kitson pulling a passenger train into Diksal station, 1875

== Nos. 55–74 ==
These were 0-6-0 six coupled tender goods locomotives, manufactured by M/s Sharp, Stewart & Co.. These had 4'6'' driving wheels. First three arrived in 1859 (Nos. 55–57), while the remaining arrived by 1861. All were reboilered between 1869 and 1876, with boilers built at the Byculla Shops. (The boilers being of the same dimensions as reboiled Kitsons) A locomotive of this class, renumbered as No. 11 was built at Byculla in 1865 mainly from spare parts of this class, and other classes available. Locomotive No. 74 suffered a boiler explosion. All the locomotives of the series were withdrawn in 1897.

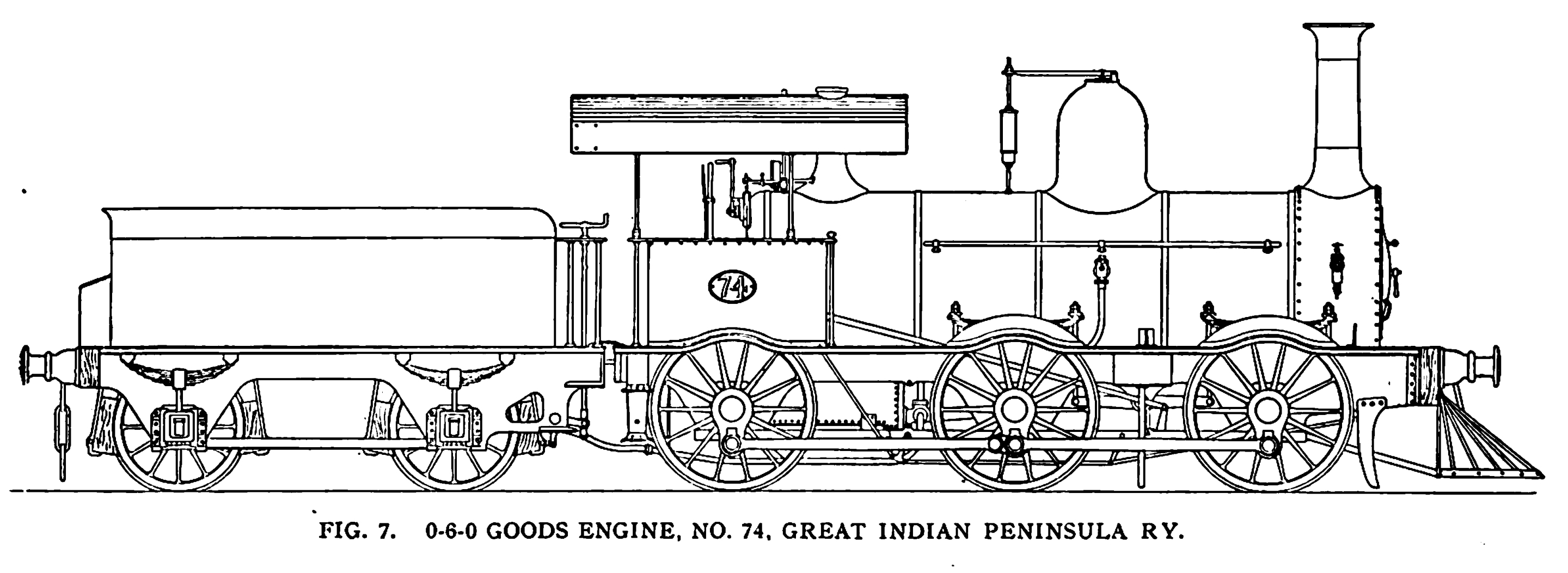
GIPR Locomotive no. 74

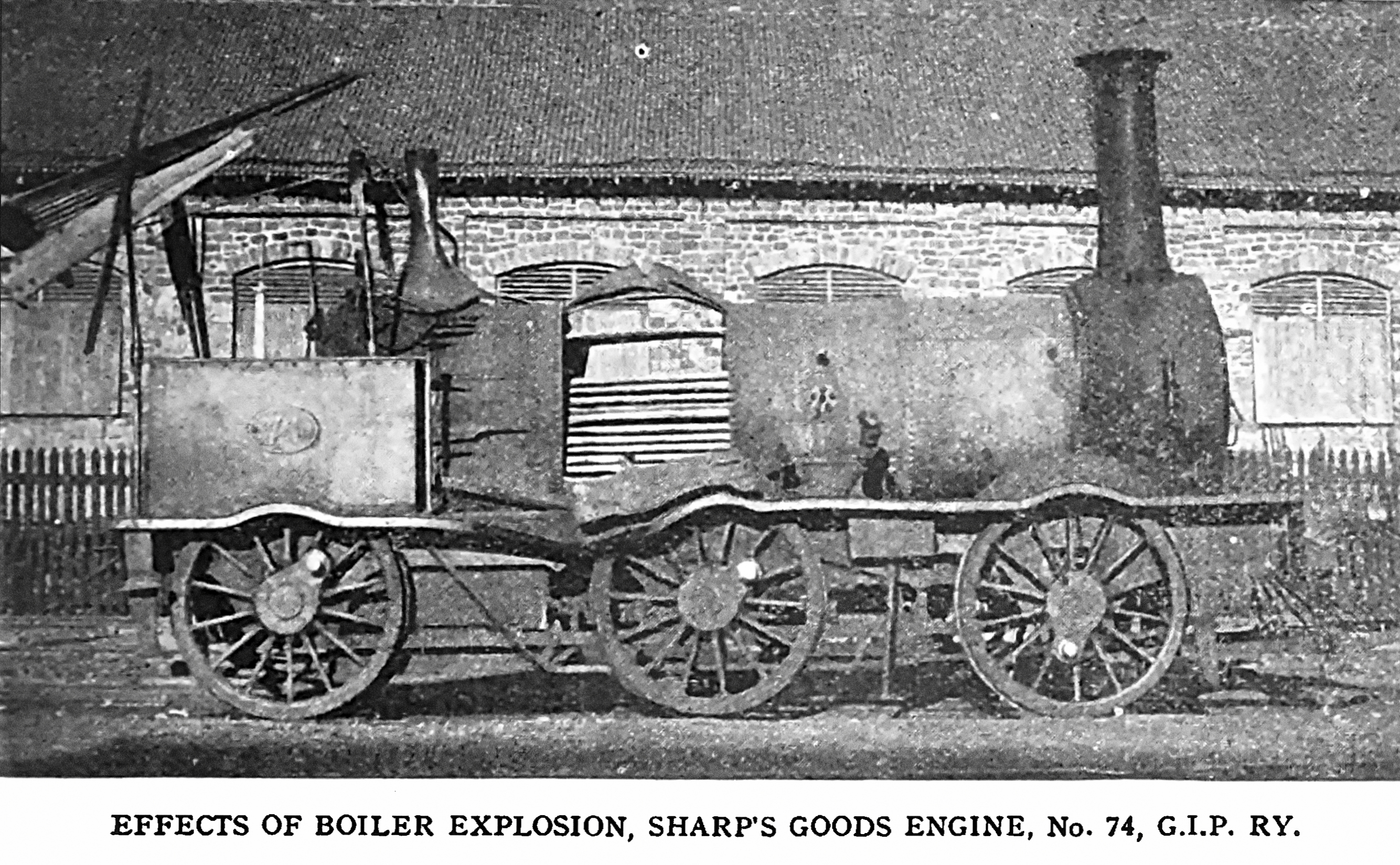
Boiler Explosion of GIPR Locomotive no. 74

== Nos. 75–94 ==
These were 0-6-0 tender goods locomotives manufactured by M/s Neilson & Co.. These had 5 ft driving wheels, like the original Vulcan Foundry Locos. The first four arrived in 1862 and all engines were running by the end of 1864, During a shortage of Passenger engines around 1885, one of these ran mail/passenger trains on Lonavla section, with front coupling rods removed, and crank pin unbalanced. No. 82 was sold to East Coast Railway, and all others were broken up, the last in 1901.

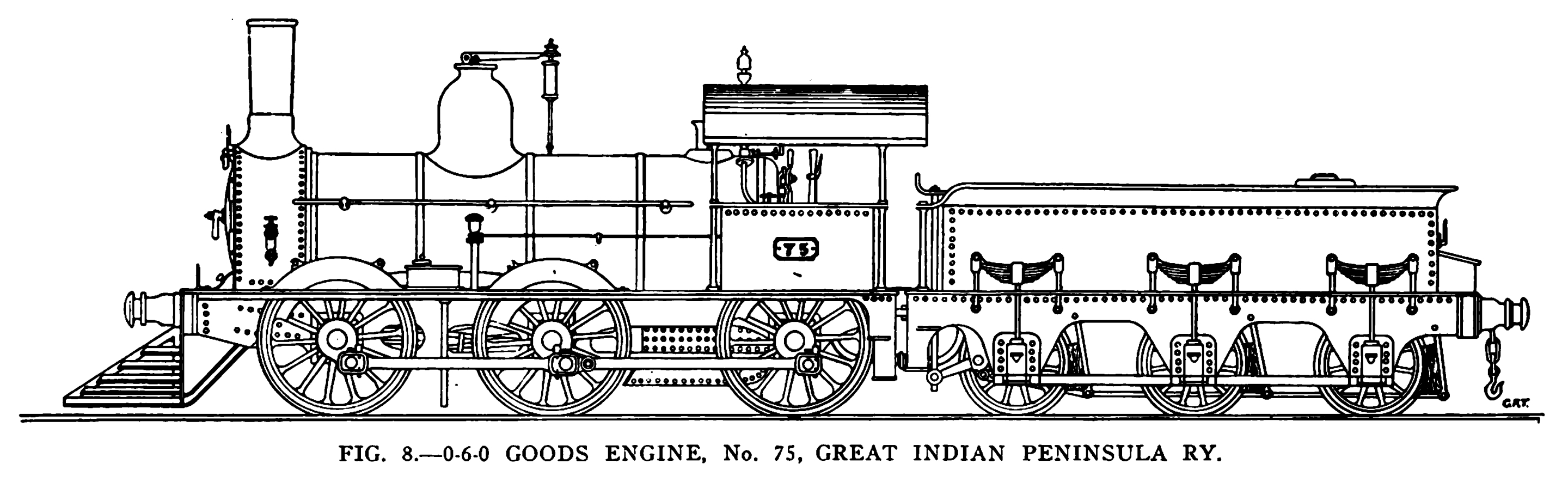
GIPR Locomotive no. 75

== Nos. 95–108 ==
These were 0-4-0 tank locomotives manufactured by E. B Wilson & Co.. They had 4 ft driving wheels. The first four (Nos.95-98) were put to work in July 1858, and all were put to work between 1858 and 1864. Initially put on service at the Bhor Ghat incline, these were intended to be worked in pairs coupled back to back. (14 were delivered, to be used as 7 pairs) The original build had sledge brakes between the coupled drivers. This method of braking was found unsatisfactory, and was soon discarded. The engines were subsequently rebuilt, with the frames lengthened at trailing end, and another pair of coupled wheels added at rear. The saddle tank was shortened, and supplemented by a tank fitted at the rear. Few were given additional tanks on the footplate, while others had it fitted between the frames. From 1867, these were used for shunting. However, in 1877, old tenders were fitted to some, and they used on mainline for goods traffic. The trailing coupling rods were removed from a few, and these were set to work local passenger trains between Bombay-Tannah. All were rebuilt between 1889 and 1894 with a standard "Z" type Boiler. No 107 was rebuilt in 1905 to work trailer carriage for a branch motor service. It was painted bright green, with electric headlights, to work on Bhopal-Ujjain line, and later on the Balharshah Coliery Branch. It was still in service as late as 1926. One of the reboilered engine was later renumbered as No.85.

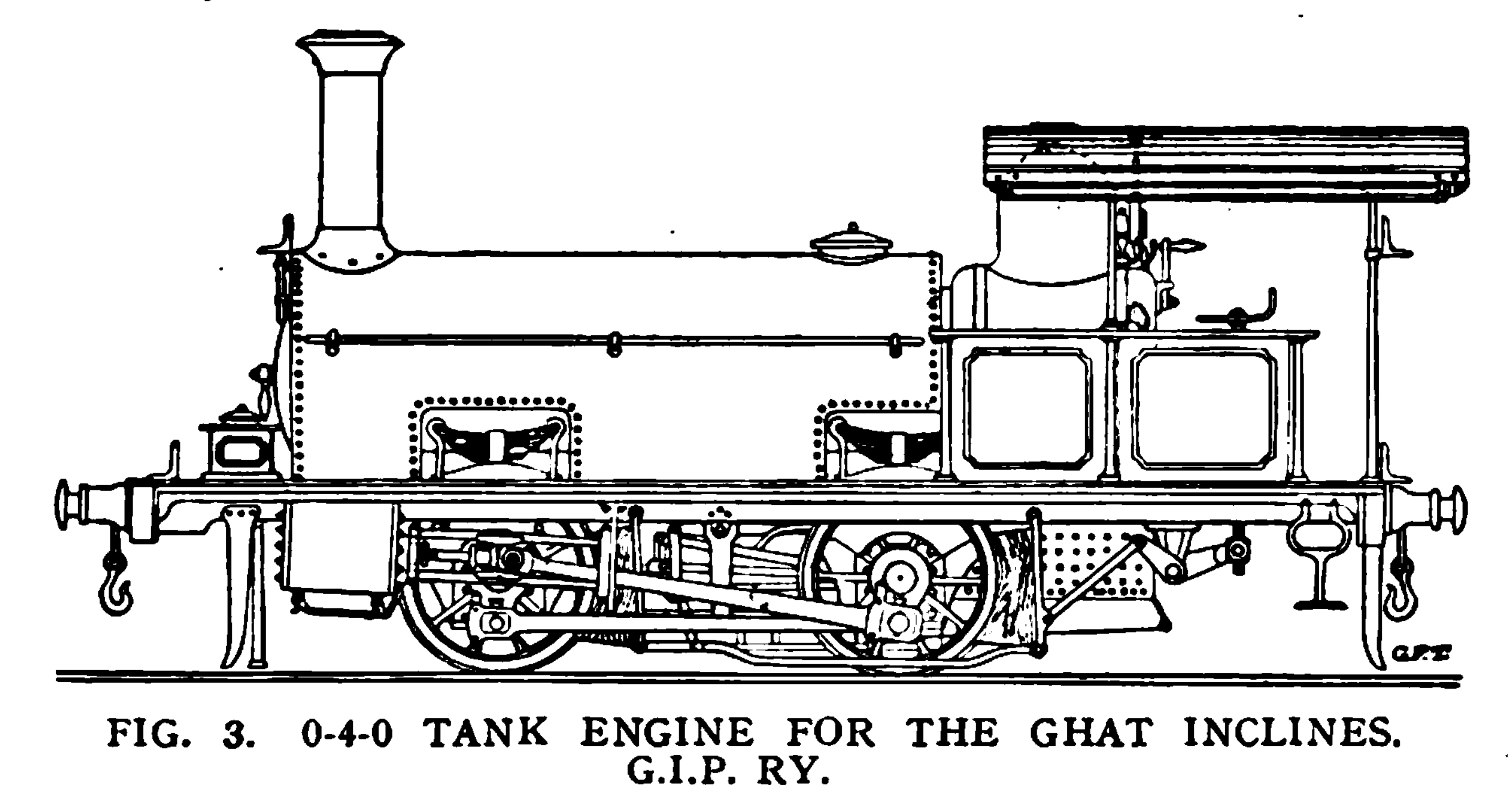
GIPR 0-4-0 Tank Engine built by E.B.Wilson

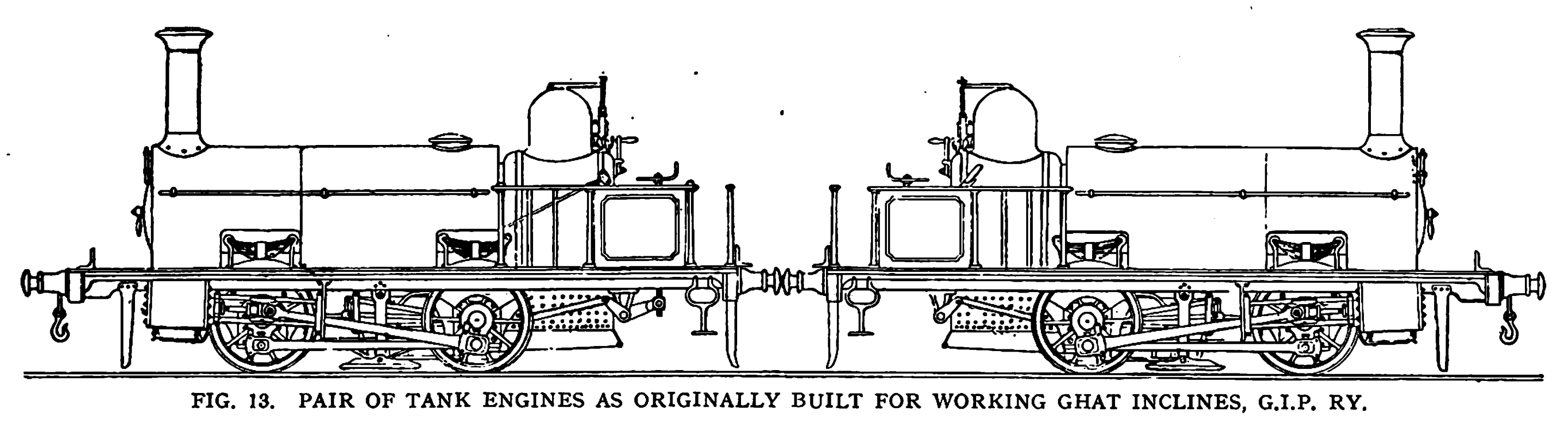
GIPR 0-4-0 Tank Engine in paired configuration

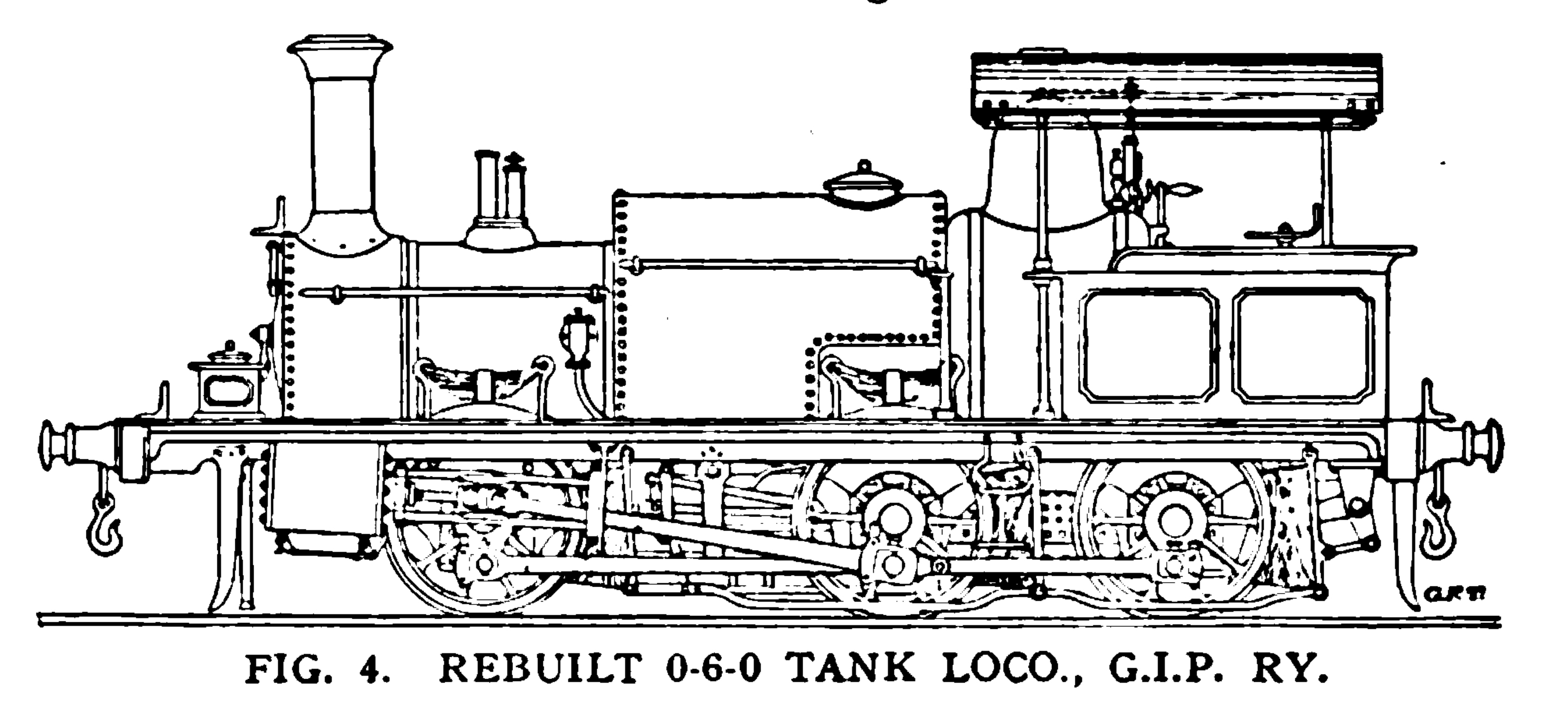
Rebuilt GIPR 0-4-0 Tank Engine, in 0-6-0 configuration

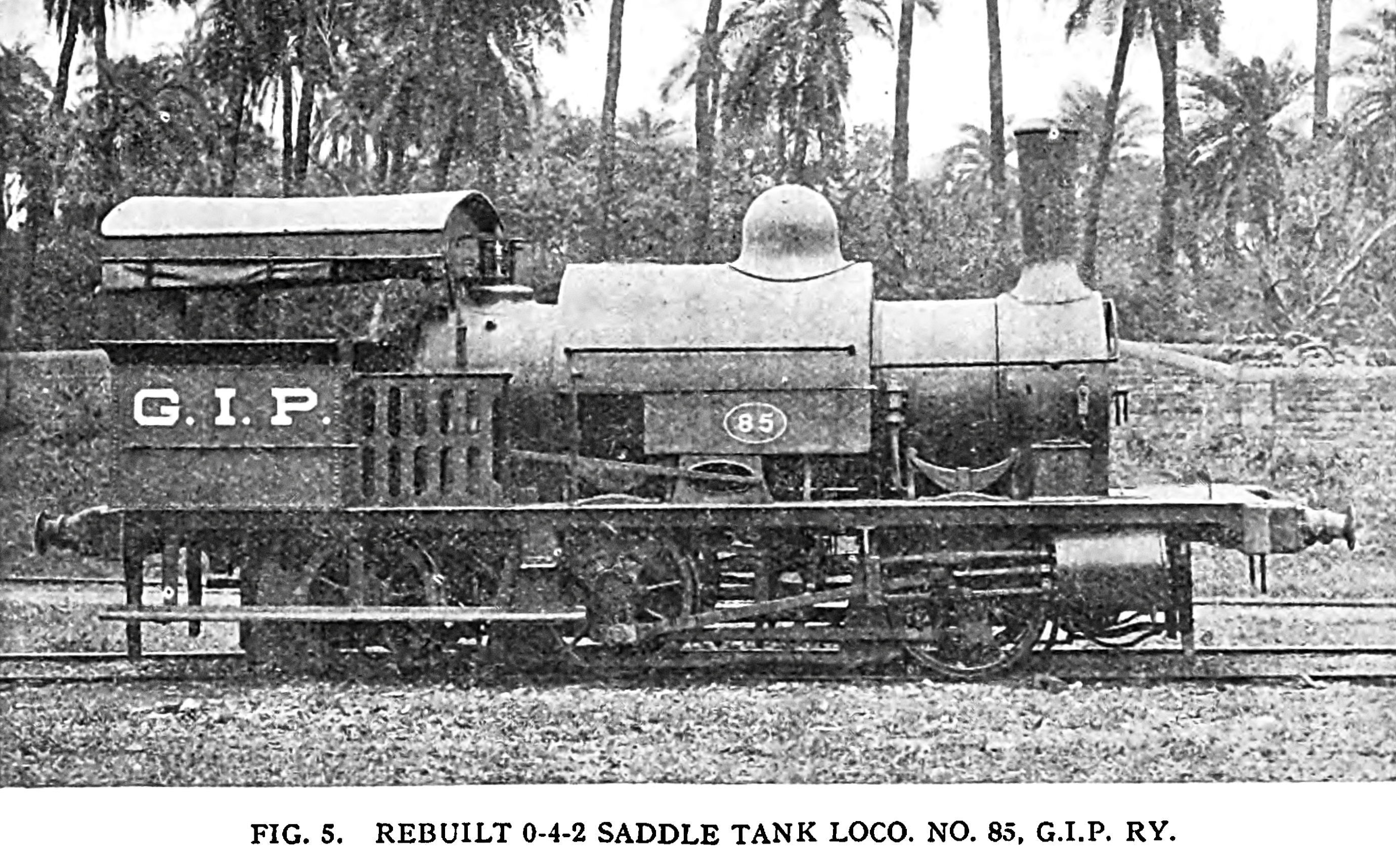
Rebuilt GIPR 0-4-0 Tank Engine, renumbered as 85

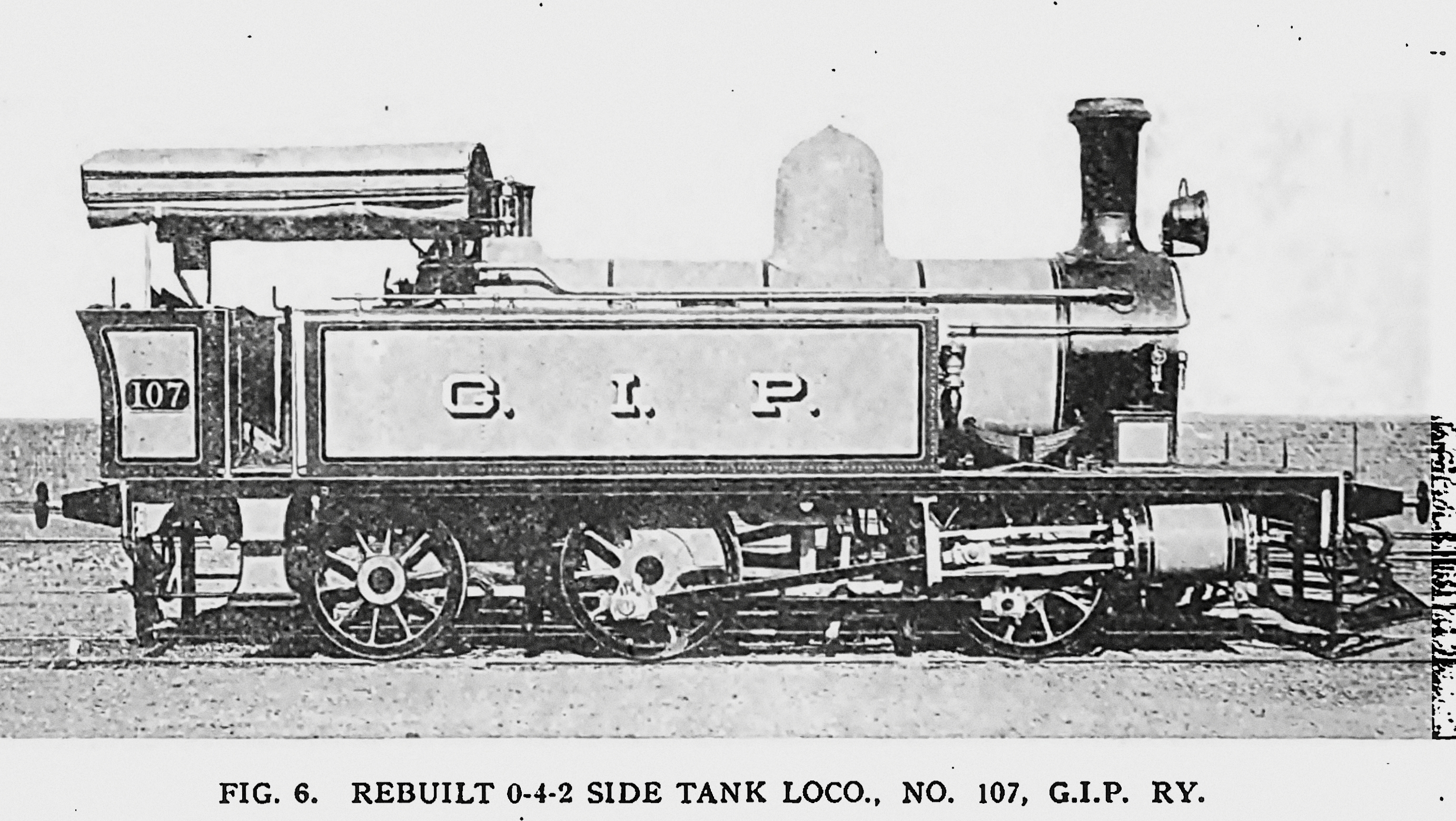
GIPR Locomotive no. 107

== Nos. 109–113 ==
These were 4-6-0 tank locomotives manufactured by M/s Sharp, Stewart & Co.. They had 4'4'' driving wheels. The first locomotive, No. 109 arrived in 1863, No. 110, in 1864 and rest in 1865. These were brought in as traffic increased over Bhor Ghat, and more powerful engines were needed than the previous four wheeler E.B. Wilson tanks. These had compensating levers producing a three-point suspension for the ten wheeled engine. These were not very successful, and no more were built. These too were built with sledge block brakes that directly applied on the tracks. This was however removed before locos were put to service. The last of the series was broken up in 1886.

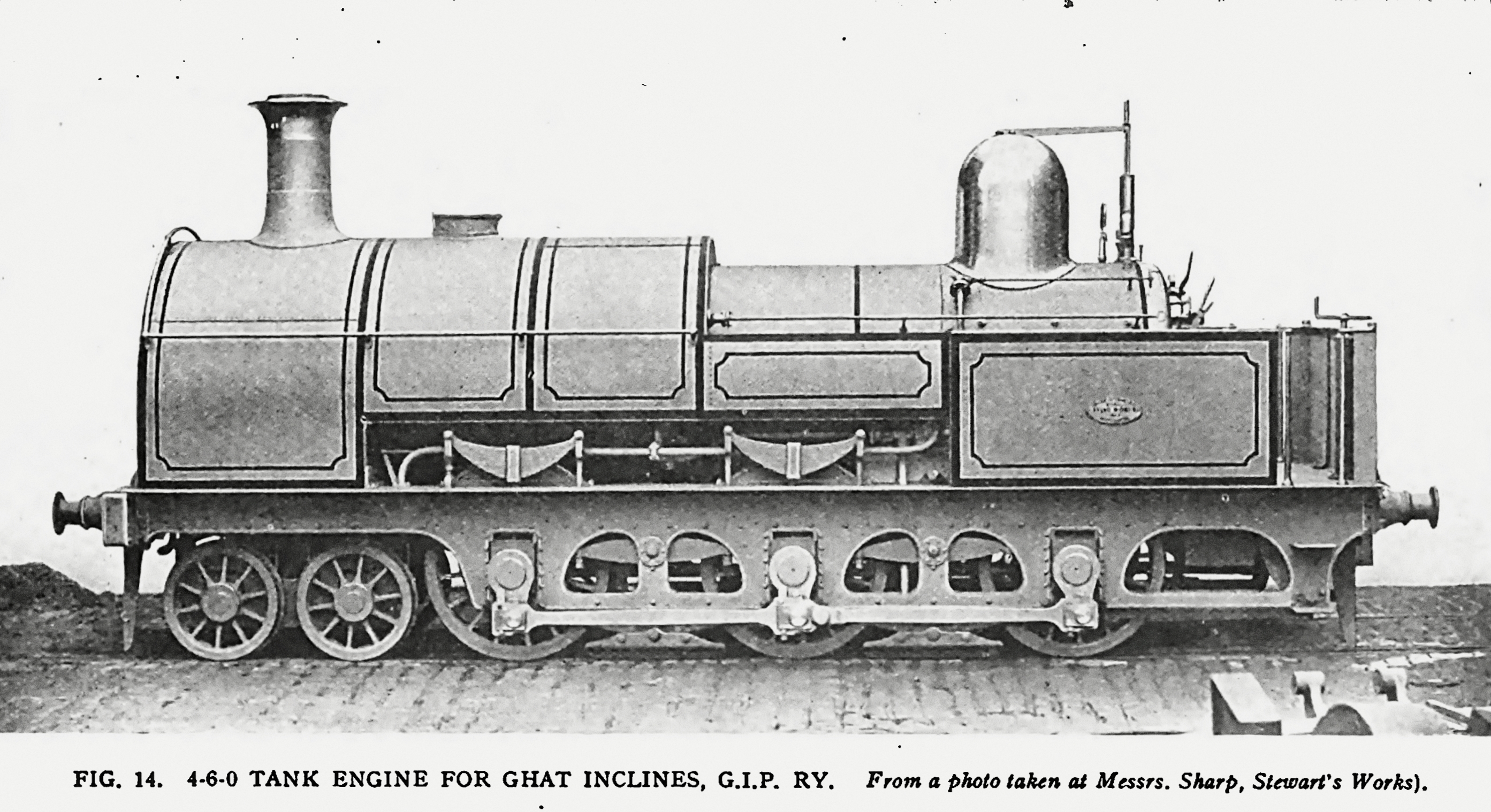
Photograph of Sharp, Stewart & Co. GIPR 0-4-0 Tank Locomotive

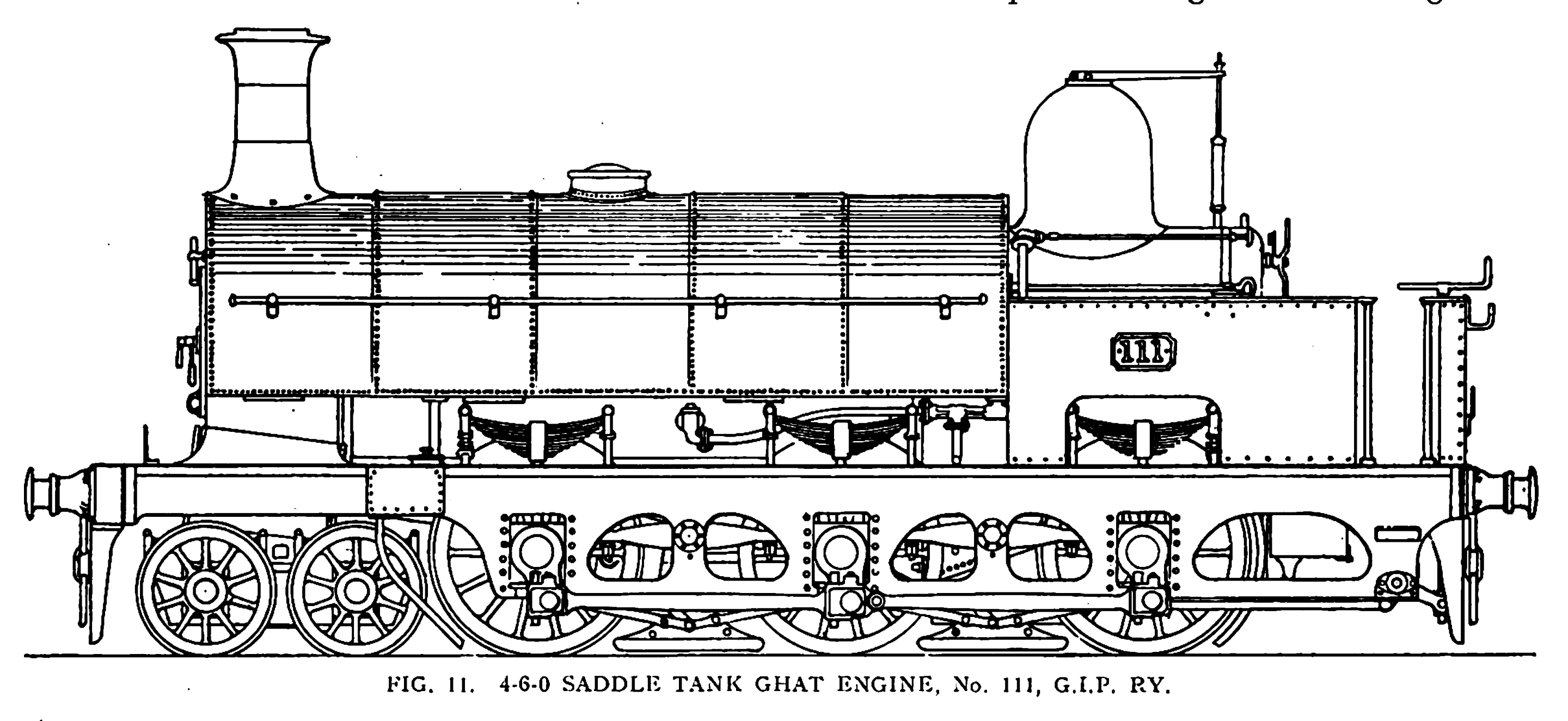
GIPR Locomotive no. 111

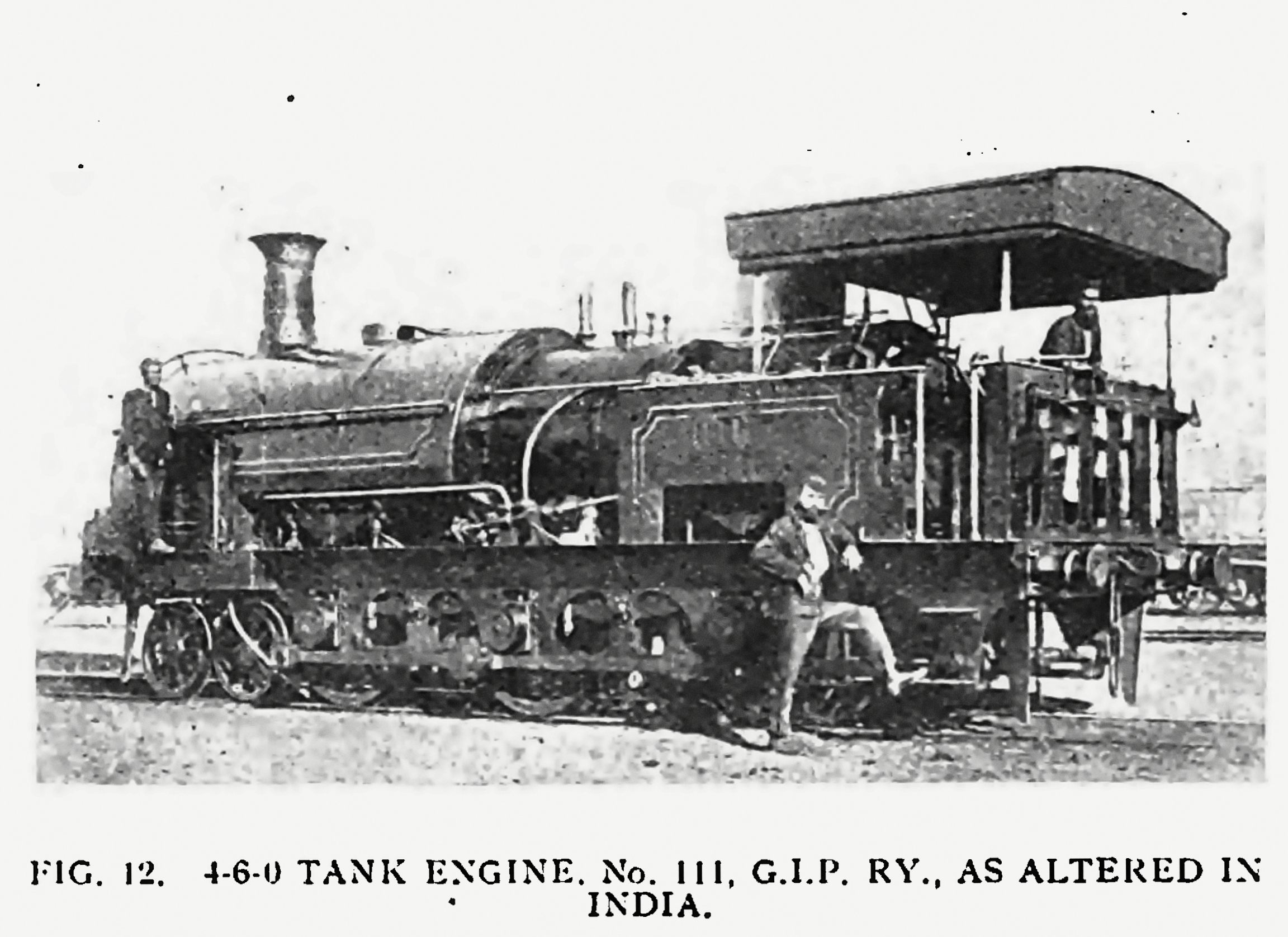
Photograph of GIPR Locomotive no. 111

== Nos. 120–139 ==
These were 2-4-0 Passenger tender locomotives manufactured by M/s Robert Stephenson & Co.. They had 3'6'' driving wheels. The first two locomotives were put to service in 1862, while the last was not put into service until 1866. These were similar to Kitson passenger engines. The last of the series, No. 138 was named "Thanna". It was used for a while for shunting at the Parel Works. It was broken up in 1888.

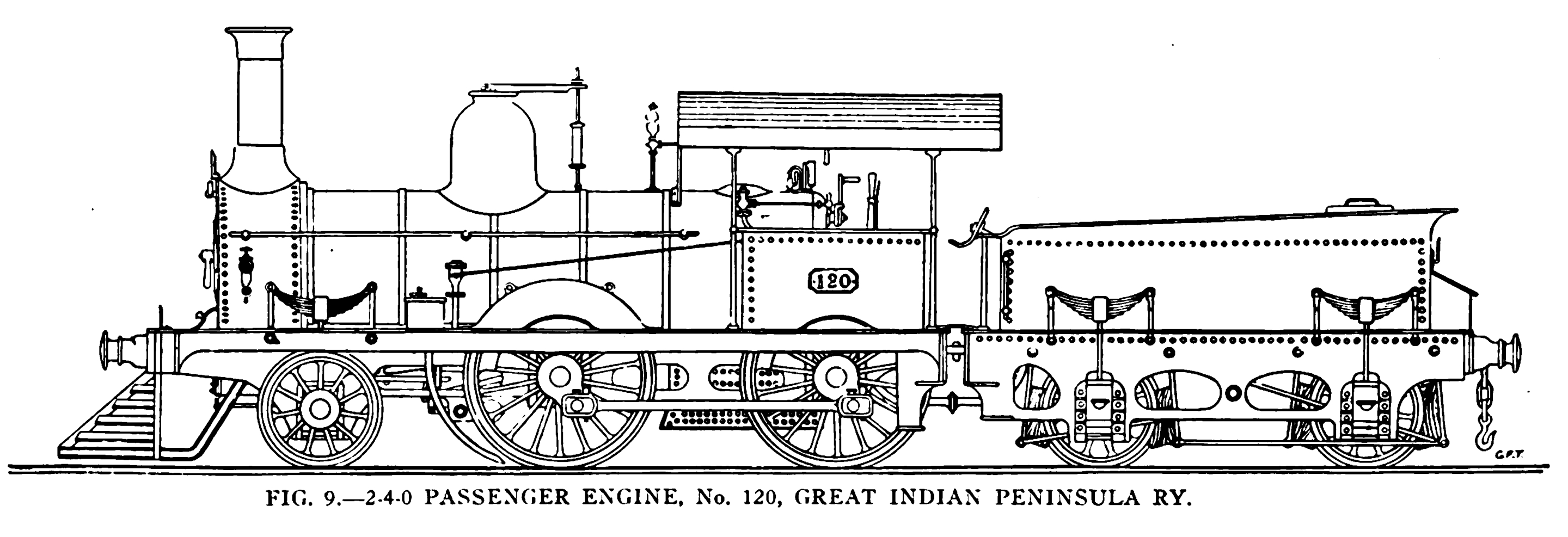
GIPR Locomotive no. 120

== Nos. 140–165 ==
These were 0-6-0 Tender goods locomotives manufactured by M/s Kitson & Hewitson. These had 5 ft driving wheels. The first seven were put to service in 1863. Nine were fitted with "Z" type boiler and 17 in cylinders when rebuilt. In late 1880s, Nos. 143,144,163,165 were sold to East Coast Railway while No. 158 was sold to Rewah State Railway. No. 142 presented to Victoria Technical Institute for instructional purposes. Nos. 146, 148 were used for a while as shunting locos in Loco yards of Bhusaval, and Igatpuri, and named after those stations. Nos. 147, 164 used as yard engines at Parel, and named "Coorla" and "Bombay" respectively. The last of these was disposed off in 1895.

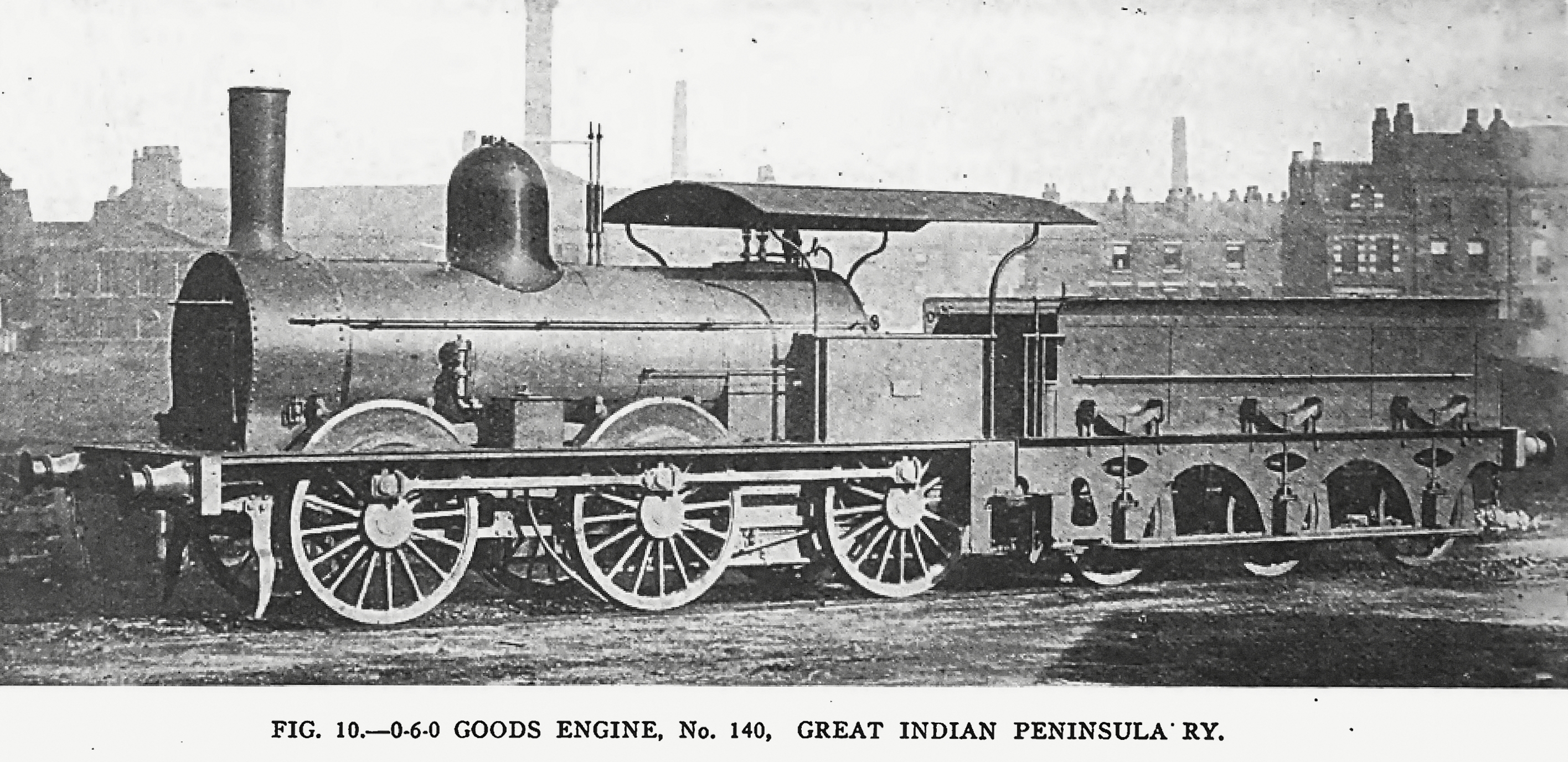
GIPR Locomotive no. 140
