= Lord Falkland (locomotive) =

Type and origin
- Power type: Steam
- Builder: E. B. Wilson and Company
Specifications
- Gauge: 1,676 mm (5 ft 6 in)
- Fuel type: Steam
Career
- Operators: Great Indian Peninsula Railway
- First run: 23 February 1852
- Disposition: Unknown

Lord Falkland was the first steam locomotive to run in Bombay. It made its maiden run on 23 February 1852, fourteen months before the official opening of the Great Indian Peninsula Railway (the company that operated it) on 16 April 1853, the beginning of rail transport in India.

It was named after the then Governor of Bombay, Lucius Cary, the tenth Lord Falkland. The locomotive was a tank engine presumably built by E.B.Wilson Foundry, the same foundry whose standard gauge loco Thomason first ran in Roorkee December 1851, during the construction of the Solani Aqueduct. It was primarily used for shunting wagons, later also for pulling first trial train run between Bombay and Tannah (now Thane) in November 1852.

== Commencement of service ==
The Locomotive arrived in Bombay by ship on the evening of 6 February 1852, at the wood yard of Mazgaon. The engine was pulled on a public road by around 200 coolies, all the way to its shed near the Byculla bridge. A trial run of the locomotive was held on 23rd February 1852, between its shed (near the Native Education Society press) and Parel. The response of the natives of Bombay was greatly enthusiastic, with them gathering in large crowds to view the first run, exclaiming with amazement a "Shabash" ("Well done") when the locomotive began its journey. Starting at a walking pace, it later sped up to 15 mph (24 km/h). For some time, the natives gathered around the moving contraption, pressing all around her, and barely leaving the line clear. The locomotive reached Parel, the then seat of power of the Governor, where it halted for sometime, following which, it returned back to its starting point. A second trip was soon undertaken, with this time a lady among the passengers. There were slight stoppages to correct certain issues, but the locomotive appeared in perfect mechanical order. Later that day, it was put to service, hauling material for the construction of the railroad.

== In regular operations ==
The locomotive was soon put in regular service to Sion, carrying ballast.The locomotive soon became a thing of immense public interest, with the natives keenly observing the machine pull twelve wagons up a steep slope during its operations. Unsatisfied of looking from the side, they would come extremely close to the moving engine, only clearing the path when it came just a few meters away. This was deemed dangerous, and it was suggested that police be provided here for the safety of the public. Eventually, twelve men with sticks, headed by a European, were constantly employed to keep the crowds in check. Sensing an opportunity, a few set up booths selling toddy and cakes, for, the visitors stayed to watch the railway operations for hours.

== Falkland pulling the first trial train run ==
On 18 November 1852, a trial journey was undertaken by the company, between Bombay and Tannah, pulled by the Lord Falkland. The passengers on this excursion were the directors, and engineers, in holiday attire, making their afternoon journey to the Parsick (Parsik) point at Tannah. Among the passengers were Major Swanson (director, GIPR), Captain Crawford, Captain Barr, Dr.Buist, and Jagannath Shankarseth. At Parsick, they would tiffin in the tunnel, and after some time leave back for Bombay, reaching by sunset. The locomotives and carriages for the GIPR had arrived two months prior in September 1852, but were still under the process of commissioning, the engines being expected to be ready by February of the following year. The contractors hence provided their only working locomotive, Lord Falkland, for this journey. With the carriages still not in order, trucks would be fitted up instead.

The passengers were accommodated in a truck (probably similar to a wagon), that was covered by an awning and curtains, and tastefully decorated with branches of laurel, mango, and the palm. The journey commenced at 12:04 p.m. The train halted for a few minutes beyond the Sion Causeway to fill in water. It took the train 18 minutes to travel this distance of 9 miles. The whole journey upto Tannah occupied 45 minutes. This time, the engine achieved a maximum speed of 50 mph (80 km/h), with an average of 30 mph (about 48 km/h). The locomotive stopped at the Tannah Viaduct, it not having been completed yet. The passengers were therefore conveyed across the river by boats. From the other end of the viaduct, they were carried upto the first tunnel by horse drawn trucks. A splendid tiffin was laid out in the 100 yd tunnel. The tunnel had not been perfected yet, still requiring rock clearing in some places. During the luncheon, toasts were raised to the success of the railway operations. Afterwards, the party proceeded back towards Bombay, returning by evening near the Byculla viaduct.

== Aftermath ==
The official train journey that took place on 16 April 1853 between Bori Bunder and Tannah, was pulled not by Lord Falkland, but by three locomotives manufactured by the Vulcan Foundry. It has been suggested that Lord Falkland continued its service on the line for sometime, and later sold to the BB&CI Railway that too began its service in the western part of Bombay in the 1860s.

== See also ==
- List of earliest GIPR locomotives
- GIP-2 to 9
