= Architecture of Mumbai =

Overview of architecture in Mumbai, India

The architecture of Mumbai blends Gothic, Victorian, Art Deco, Indo-Saracenic & contemporary architectural styles. Many buildings, structures and historical monuments remain from the colonial era. Mumbai, after Miami, has the second largest number of Art Deco buildings in the world.

== Styles ==
=== Victorian Gothic architecture ===
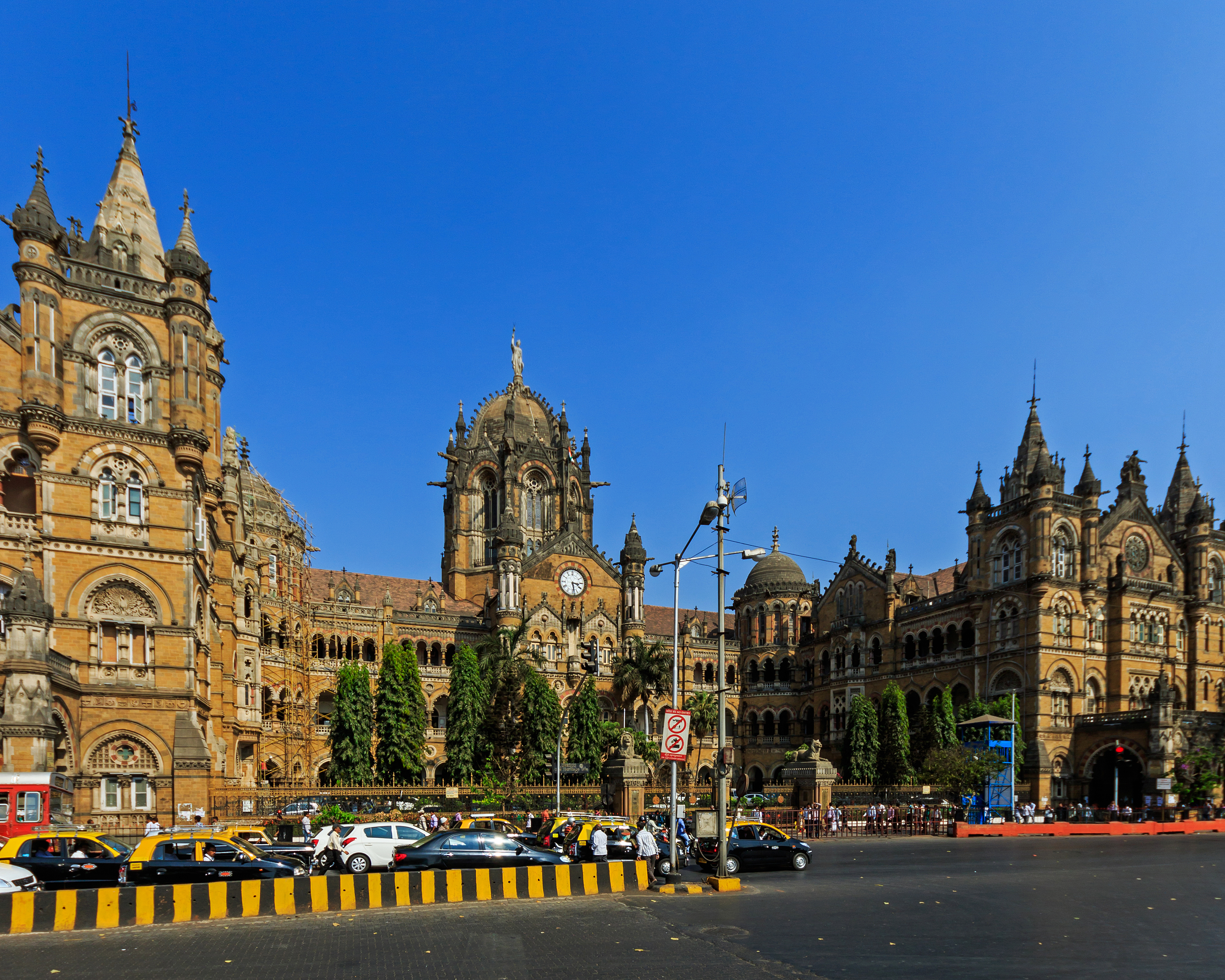
Chhatrapati Shivaji Maharaj Terminus

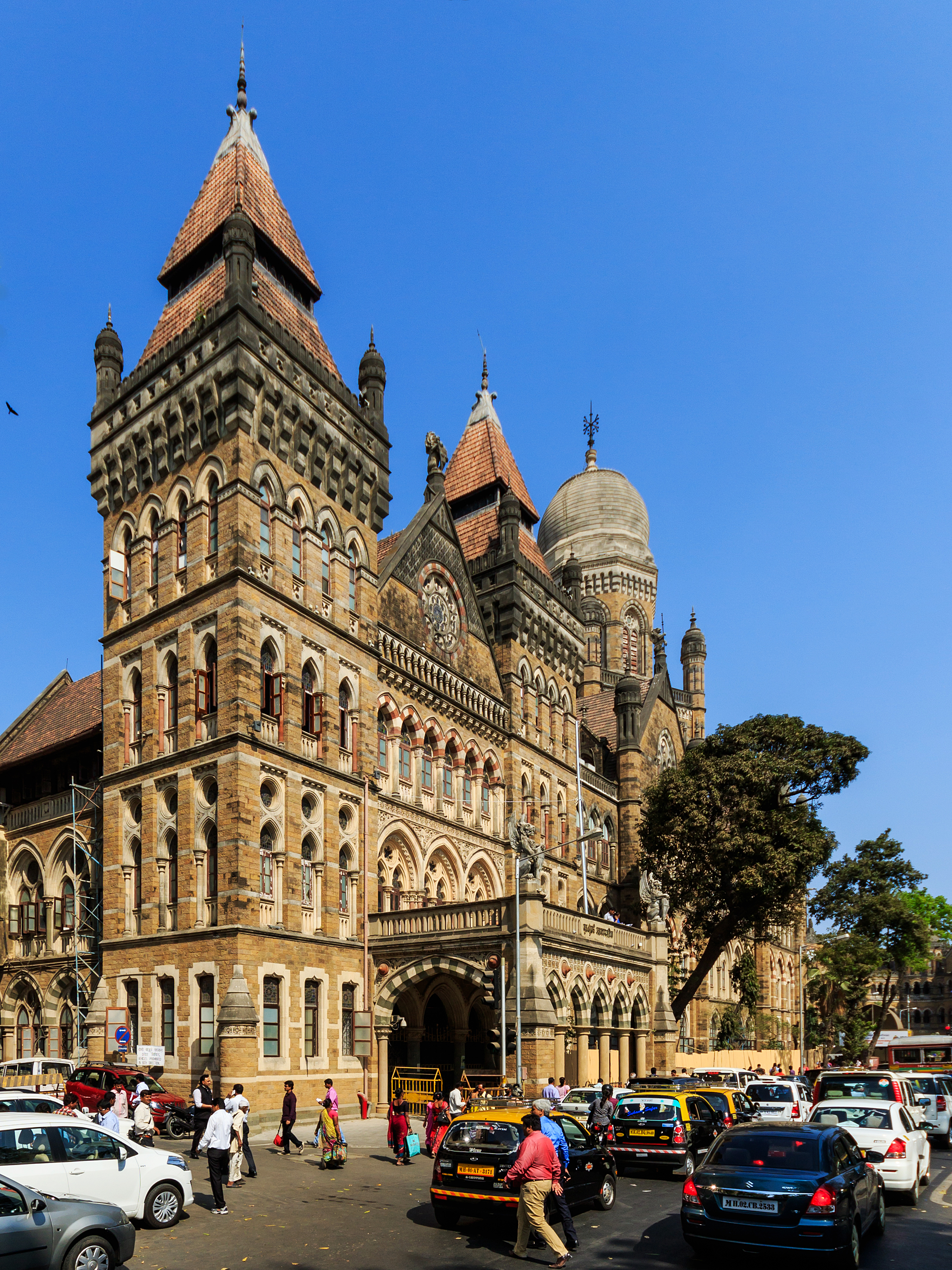
Municipal Corporation Building

Buildings designed in the gothic revival style by Frederick William Stevens.

Mumbai Architecture came to be present through the British in the 18th and early 19th centuries. At first, it was the neoclassical style of architecture but later, the Victorian Gothic style (also known as Gothic revival) came to dominate the city. Where the neoclassical has an orderly, monochromatic presence, the Gothic style is expressive, disjointed, with surfaces of lively colors, beautified with carved and narrative elements, consisting of flying buttresses, lancet windows, and stained glass. At first, due to the immense freed space it obtained, Gothic buildings only served as churches, as religious buildings built by people of the 11th century. However, soon enough there came a need for public halls, parliament houses, mansions, and the Gothic era was the solution. Indian architects came to analyze this style and represent it and put it into play in relation with the climate, and in relation to society's plans and sensibilities. This style, the blend of Gothic and contemporary styles, is what came to be known as "Mumbai Gothic."

According to writer Jan Morris, "Mumbai is one of the most characteristically Victorian cities in the world, displaying all the grand effrontery of Victorian eclecticism". The British influence on buildings in the city is evident from the colonial era. However, the architectural features include a range of European influences such as German gables, Dutch roofs, Swiss timbering, Romance arches and Tudor casements often inter-fused with traditional Indian features.

Mumbai City Hall was built during the period 1820 and 1835, by Colonel Thomas Cowper. The Fort campus of the University of Mumbai and Rajabai Clock Tower, St. Xavier's College, The Secretariat, Telegraph Office, Wilson College, and Victoria Terminus are also fine examples of gothic architecture in the city.

==== Victoria Terminus ====
Victoria Terminus is a historic terminal train station and UNESCO World Heritage Site in Mumbai, Maharashtra, India.

The terminus was designed by British architectural engineer Frederick William Stevens in the style of Victorian Italianate Gothic Revival architecture. Its construction began in 1878, in a location south of the old Bori Bunder railway station, and was completed in 1887, the year marking 50 years of Queen Victoria's rule, the building being named, Victoria Terminus.

The station's name was changed to Chhatrapati Shivaji Terminus (station code CSMT) in March 1996 to honour Shivaji, the 17th-century founder of the Maratha Empire, whose name is often preceded by Chhatrapati, a royal title. In 2017, the station was again renamed Chhatrapati Shivaji Maharaj Terminus (code CSMT), where Maharaj is also a royal title. However, both the former initials "VT" and the current, "CSMT", are commonly used.

The terminus is the headquarters of India's Central Railway. It is one of the busiest railway stations in India, serving as a terminal for both long-distance- and suburban trains.

The railway station was built to replace the Bori Bunder railway station, in the Bori Bunder area of Mumbai, a prominent port and warehouse area known for its imports and exports. Since Mumbai became a major port city at the time, a bigger station was built to meet its demands, and was named Victoria Terminus, after the then reigning Empress of India, Queen Victoria. The station was designed by the consulting British architect Frederick William Stevens. Work began in 1878. He received ₹1,614,000 (US$23,000) as the payment for his services. Stevens earned the commission to construct the station after a masterpiece watercolour sketch by draughtsman Axel Haig. The final design bears some resemblance to St Pancras railway station in London. George Gilbert Scott's plans for Berlin's parliament building had been published four years before, and also has marked similarities to the station's design.

The station took ten years to complete, the longest for any building of that era in Bombay. This famous architectural landmark in a Gothic-revival style was built as the headquarters of the Great Indian Peninsular Railway.

The station building is designed in the High Victorian Gothic style of architecture. The building exhibits a fusion of influences from Victorian Italianate Gothic Revival architecture and classical Indian architecture. The skyline, turrets, pointed arches, and eccentric ground plan are close to classical Indian palace architecture.

==== Fort campus of the University of Mumbai ====
The Rajabai Tower in South Mumbai is located in the confines of the Fort campus of the University of Mumbai, and was constructed between 1869 and 1878. It was designed by Sir George Gilbert Scott, an English architect, and was modeled on Big Ben, the clock tower of the United Kingdom's houses of Parliament in London. The tower stands at a height of 85 m (280 ft) and at the time it was the tallest building in India. The tower fuses Venetian and Gothic styles. It is built out of the locally available buff coloured Kurla stone and stained glass.

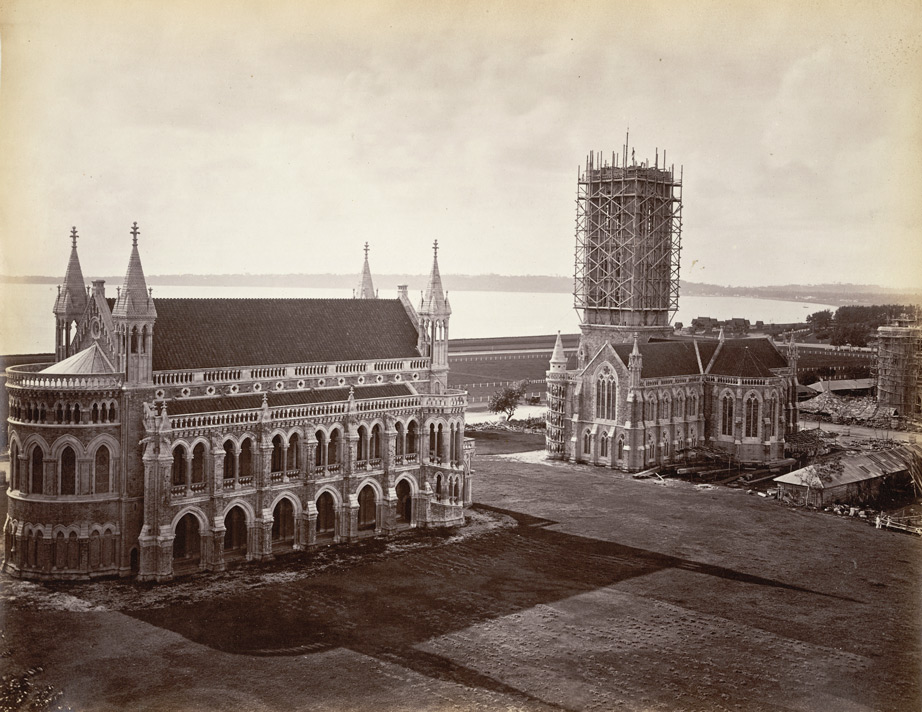
A file photo of University of Mumbai taken in the 1870s. Rajabai Clock Tower here seen shrouded in scaffolding was completed in 1878

==== Mahatma Jyotiba Phule Market ====
Mahatma Jyotiba Phule Mandai(formally Crawford Market) in south Mumbai was named after Arthur Crawford, the first Municipal Commissioner of the city. The building, completed in 1869, was donated to the city by Cowasji Jehangir. In 1882, the building was the first market in India to be lit up by electricity. The edifice is a blend of Norman, Flemish and Gothic architectural styles. The friezes on the outside entrance depicting Indian farmers, and the stone fountains inside, were designed by Lockwood Kipling, father of novelist Rudyard Kipling. The market covers an area of 22,471 sq m (24,000 sq ft) which 5,515 sq m (6,000 sq ft) is occupied by the building itself. The structure was built using coarse buff coloured Kurla stone, with redstone from Vasai.

==== Watson's Hotel ====
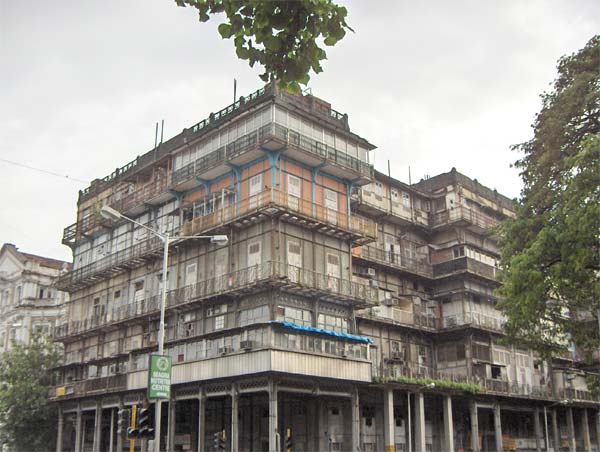
Watson's Hotel

Watson's Hotel, currently known as the Esplanade Mansion, is located in the Kala Ghoda area of Mumbai and is India's oldest surviving cast iron building. It was named after its original owner John Watson and designed by civil engineer Rowland Mason Ordish, who was also associated with the St Pancras Station in London. The building was fabricated in England between 1867 and 1869 from cast iron components and was assembled and constructed on site. The external cast-iron frame closely resembles other high-profile 19th century buildings such as London's Crystal Palace. The main façade of the hotel is distinguished by wide, open balconies on each floor that connected the guest rooms, which were built around the atrium in a courtyard arrangement.

Neglect of the building has resulted in decay and, despite its listing as a Grade II–A heritage structure, the building is now in a dilapidated state. The condition of the building was publicized by Italian architect Renzo Piano and heritage activists, and as a result of their efforts, the building was listed in June 2005 on the list of "100 World Endangered Monuments" by the World Monuments Fund, a New York-based NGO.

=== Indo-Saracenic ===
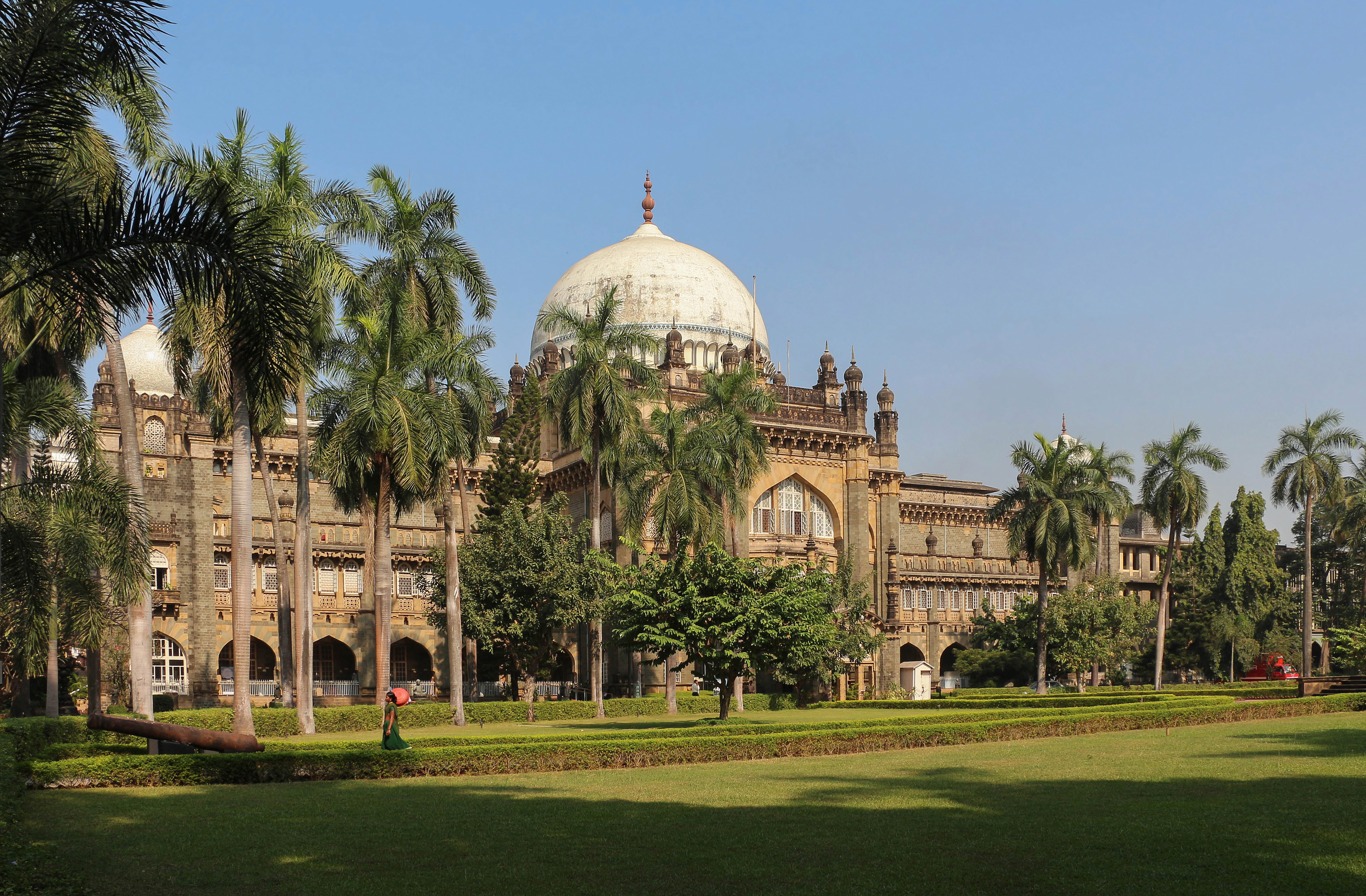
Chhatrapati Shivaji Maharaj Vastu Sangrahalaya

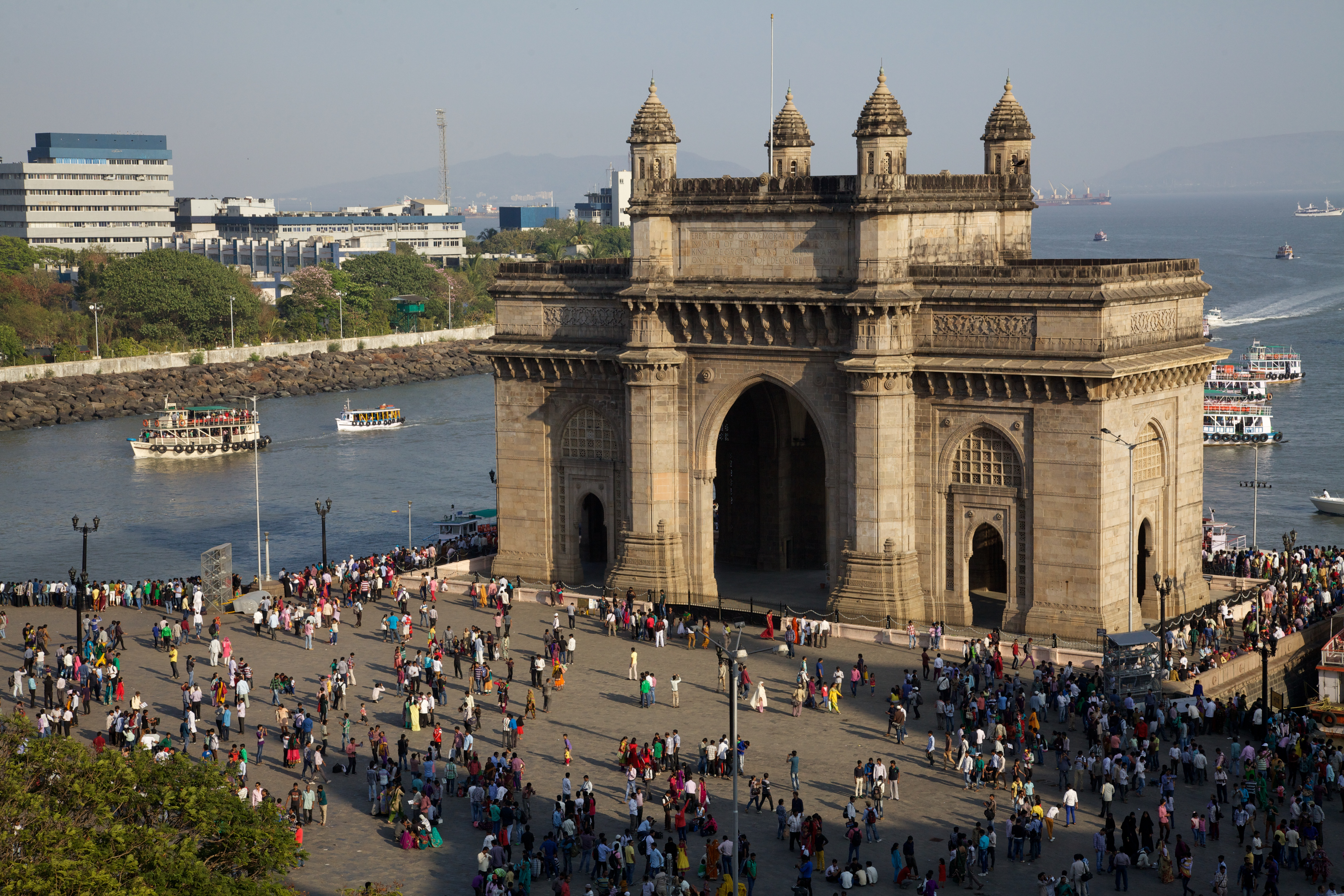
Gateway of India

Buildings designed in the Indo-Saracenic style by George Wittet.

The Indo-Saracenic style developed in the second half of the 19th century, combining Islamic and Hindu architectural styles with its characteristic domes, arches, stained glasses, spires, and minarets. The Gateway of India and Chhatrapati Shivaji Maharaj Vastu Sangrahalaya are good examples of this architectural type in the city.

==== Gateway of India ====
The Gateway of India is one of the major monuments in the city, located in the Apollo Bunder area in South Mumbai. It is a distinct 26 metres (85 ft) high arch built from yellow basalt and reinforced concrete. Many elements of the arch are derived from the Islamic architectural styles of 16th century Gujarat, the pillars are derived from the design of Hindu temples and the design of the Gateway's windows derive from Islamic architecture.

The Gateway of India was built to commemorate the visit of King George V and Queen Mary to Mumbai, prior to the Delhi Durbar, in December 1911. The foundation stone was laid on 31 March 1911, by Governor of Bombay Sir George Sydenham Clarke, and the final design of George Wittet was sanctioned in August 1914. The foundations were completed in 1920, and construction was finished in 1924. The building got the name the Gateway of India, because in the colonial era the Europeans entered India from this location, it was normally the first thing they would see while entering the country.

==== Taj Hotel ====
The Taj Mahal Palace hotel resort was commissioned by Tata and first opened its doors to guests on 16 December 1903. The original Indian architects were Sitaram Khanderao Vaidya and D. N. Mirza, and the project was completed by an English engineer W. A. Chambers. The cost of construction was £250,000 (£127 million today). During World War I, the hotel was converted into a 600-bed hospital. The dome of the hotel is made from the same steel as used in the Eiffel Tower. Jamsedti Tata imported the same steel during that time. The hotel was the first in India to install and operate a steam elevator.

=== Art Deco ===
The Deco period began in 1910 when Art Nouveau slid out of fashion. Art deco's linear symmetry was a distinct departure from the flowing asymmetrical organic curves of its predecessor style art nouveau. Art Deco is an eclectic style and designers drew inspiration from many sources. Artifacts from Ancient Egypt and Greece, Meso-America, Africa, Japan and China that had all been influential. Cubism, Orphism, Futurism and Constructivism provided an abstract, geometric language that was quickly assimilated into the Deco style and the high styles of European tradition continued to provide inspiration. Art Deco had a unique impact in America, especially in New York. Skyscrapers such as the Chrysler Building became icons of the new style, while jazz became the music of the city. The popularity of Hollywood films did much to promote Art Deco to an international audience worldwide.

Art Deco is one of Mumbai's least noticed architectural styles, though Mumbai and its suburbs possibly have the largest number of Art Deco buildings in the world. Art Deco in India (and especially in Mumbai) evolved into a unique style that came to be called Deco-Saracenic. Essentially, it was a combination of the Islamic and the Hindu architectural styles. The main features of the Indo Saracenic Style were the construction of domes, arches, spires, stained glasses and minarets. The interiors have Victorian influences while the exterior was Indian. Deco details touch every architectural aspect – lamps, flooring, wood paneling, lifts, railings and grills, muntins, chhajjas or weather shades, plinth copings and mouldings, cornices, verandahs and balconies, bronze and stainless steel fittings, brackets, etched glass, ornamental sculptures that extended to names carved out in giant letters, facades that are very airy and built in stepped -back style, etc. Mumbai's Art Deco stands out not only because it uses the easy blend of Deco-Saracenic but also because architects have used a variety of materials to express design freely. For instance, many buildings have been constructed entirely out of reinforced cement concrete but has a facing of Malad stone. Bharat Tiles, India's oldest tile manufacturers, also played an integral part in the shaping of Art Deco interiors. Some of the most visited architectural sites in Mumbai are:

- The Mahalakshmi Temple
- The Jahangir Art Gallery
- The High Court
- The General Post Office
- The Flora Fountain
- Regal Cinema

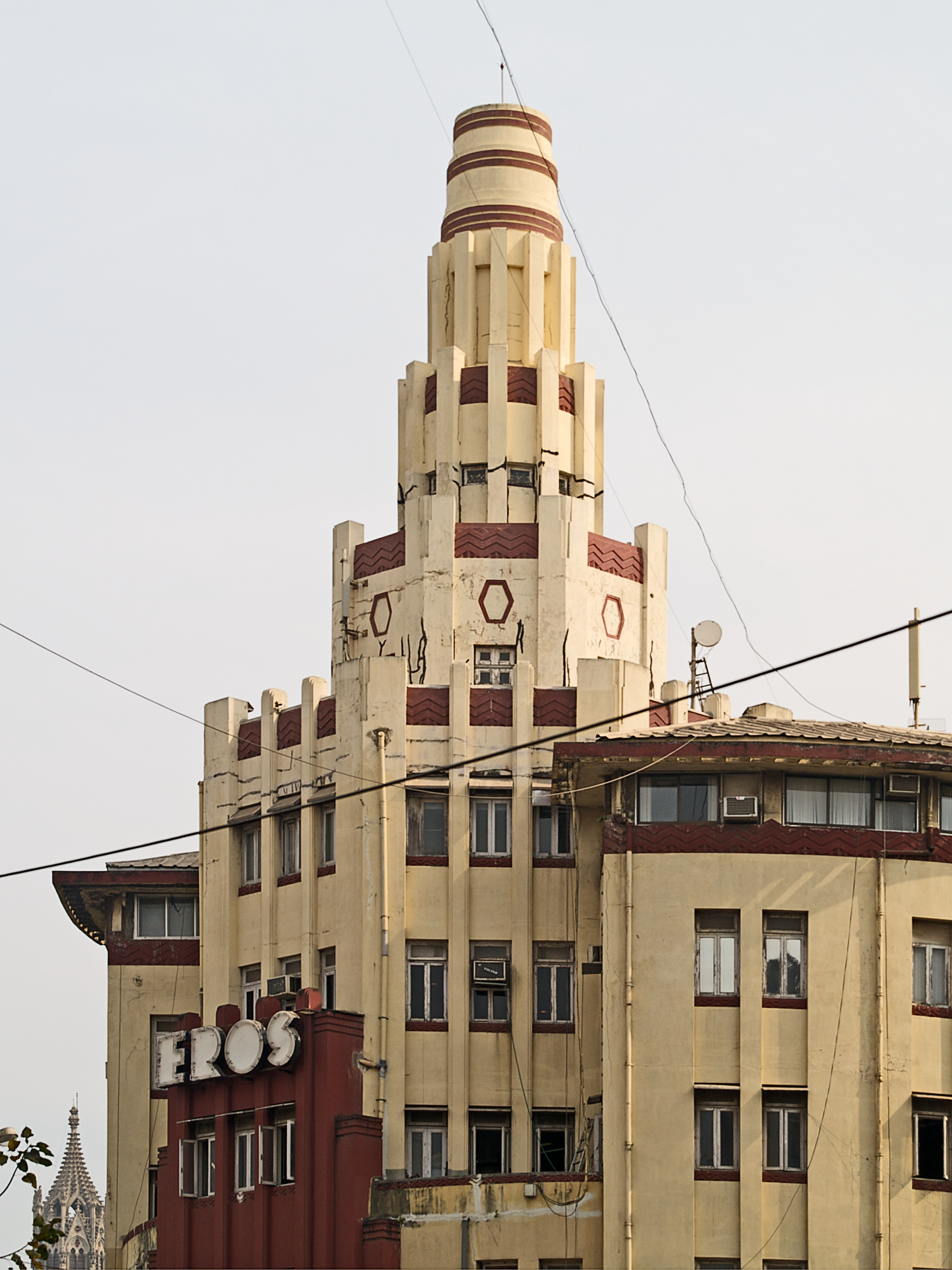
Eros Cinema

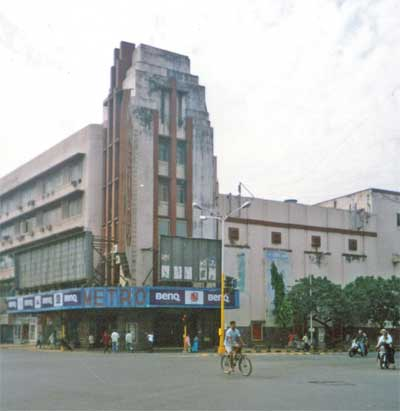
Metro Cinema now Metro Inox Cinemas, designed by Thomas W. Lamb.

Art Deco architecture in Mumbai developed during the 1930s and produced distinctly angular shaped buildings with facades. Mumbai has the second largest number of Art Deco buildings in the world. The Art Deco style is also extremely popular amongst various Cinema halls that sprung up in the early to mid 20th Century including Metro Cinema, Eros Cinema, Liberty Cinema and even Regal Cinema. Eros Cinema is a typical art deco building, designed by architect Sohrabji Bhedwar. The foundation of Eros Cinema was laid in 1935. The cinema opened in 1938 and construction of this building on the then newly reclaimed Backbay plot housing shops and other businesses, apart from the cinema, took about two and a half years to complete. Partially faced with red Agra sandstone, this building is painted cream. The two wings of this Art Deco building meet up in a central block. The foyer is in white and black marble with touches of gold. Marble staircases with chromium handrails lead up to the upper floor. The murals are in muted colours depicting Indian architectures.

The Metro Inox Cinemas, located on Mahatma Gandhi Road, at Dhobitalao Junction is also a good example of the Art Deco style of architecture that appeared in the 1930s in the city. The cinema features mainly Bollywood and Hollywood films.

== Contemporary architecture and development ==
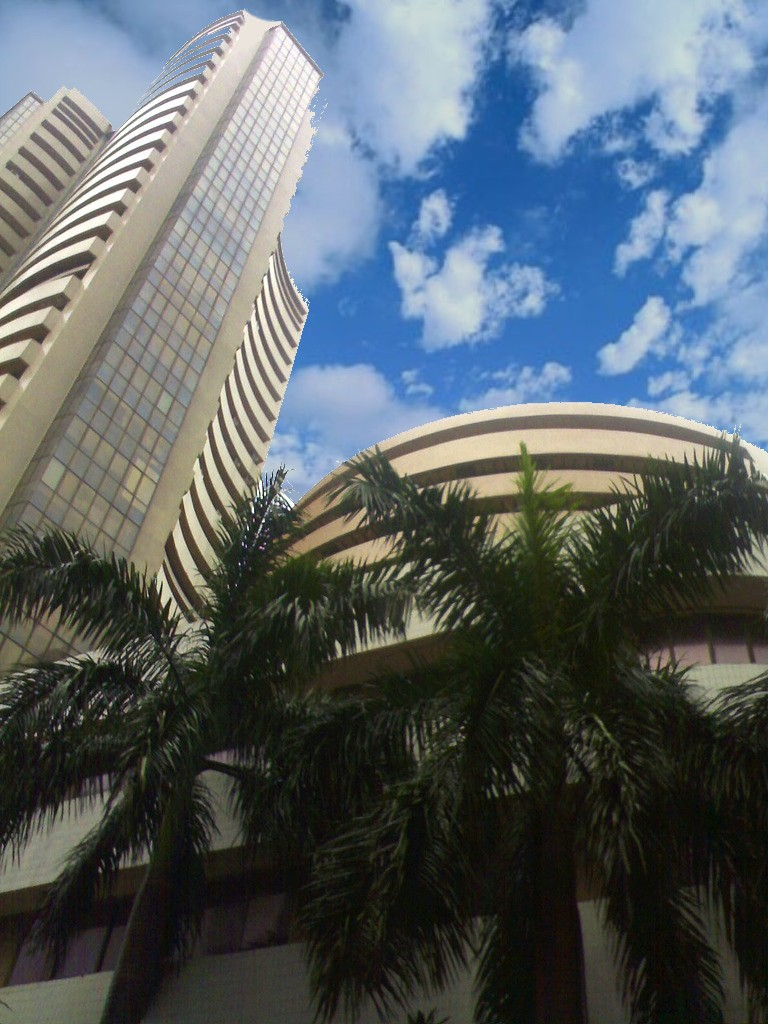
Bombay Stock Exchange building – an example of contemporary architecture.

As the wealthiest city in India, Mumbai attracts an enormous amount of international investment and has seen a large number of modern high-rise office buildings and flats spring up in recent decades. In many parts of the city, particularly the newer suburbs, modern buildings dominate the landscape away from the old part of the city. Mumbai has by far the largest number of skyscrapers in India, with 956 existing buildings and 272 under construction and many more planned as of August 2009. The tallest skyscrapers in Mumbai include the Palais Royale, The Imperial, and One Avighna Park.

The Mumbai Metropolitan Region Development Authority (MMRDA) was established in 1974 by the Government of Maharashtra to manage the planning and co-ordination of development activities in the city and to overlook the architectural development of the city.

In 1995 the Heritage Committee in Mumbai was established and, unifying architects, historians and citizens to preserve the city's tradition architectural heritage. A grading system has since been used under the heritage regulations to categorize buildings according to importance: the most important landmarks of national significance are categorized as Heritage Grade I, buildings of regional importance as Heritage Grade II and buildings of urban importance as Heritage Grade III.

== Gallery ==
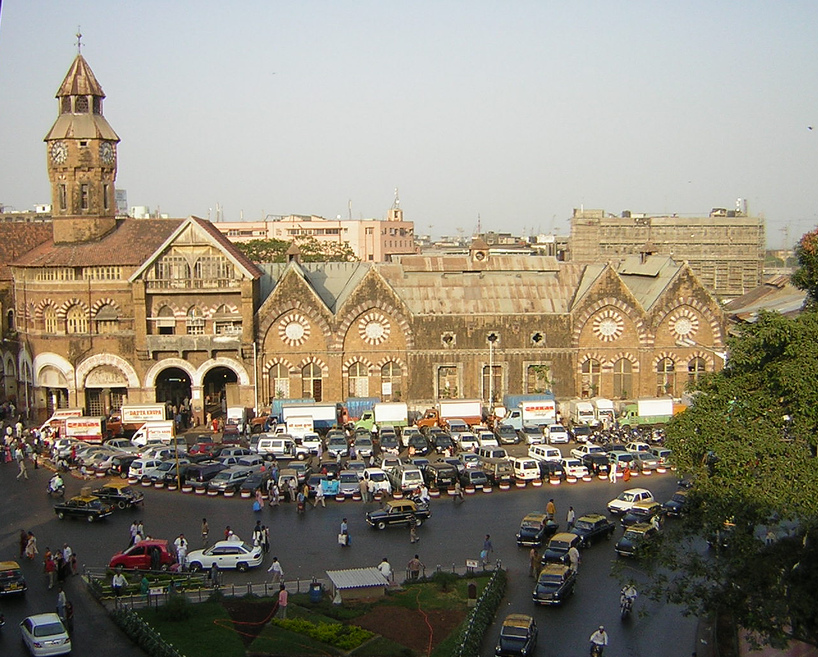
Mahatma Jyotiba Phule Mandai

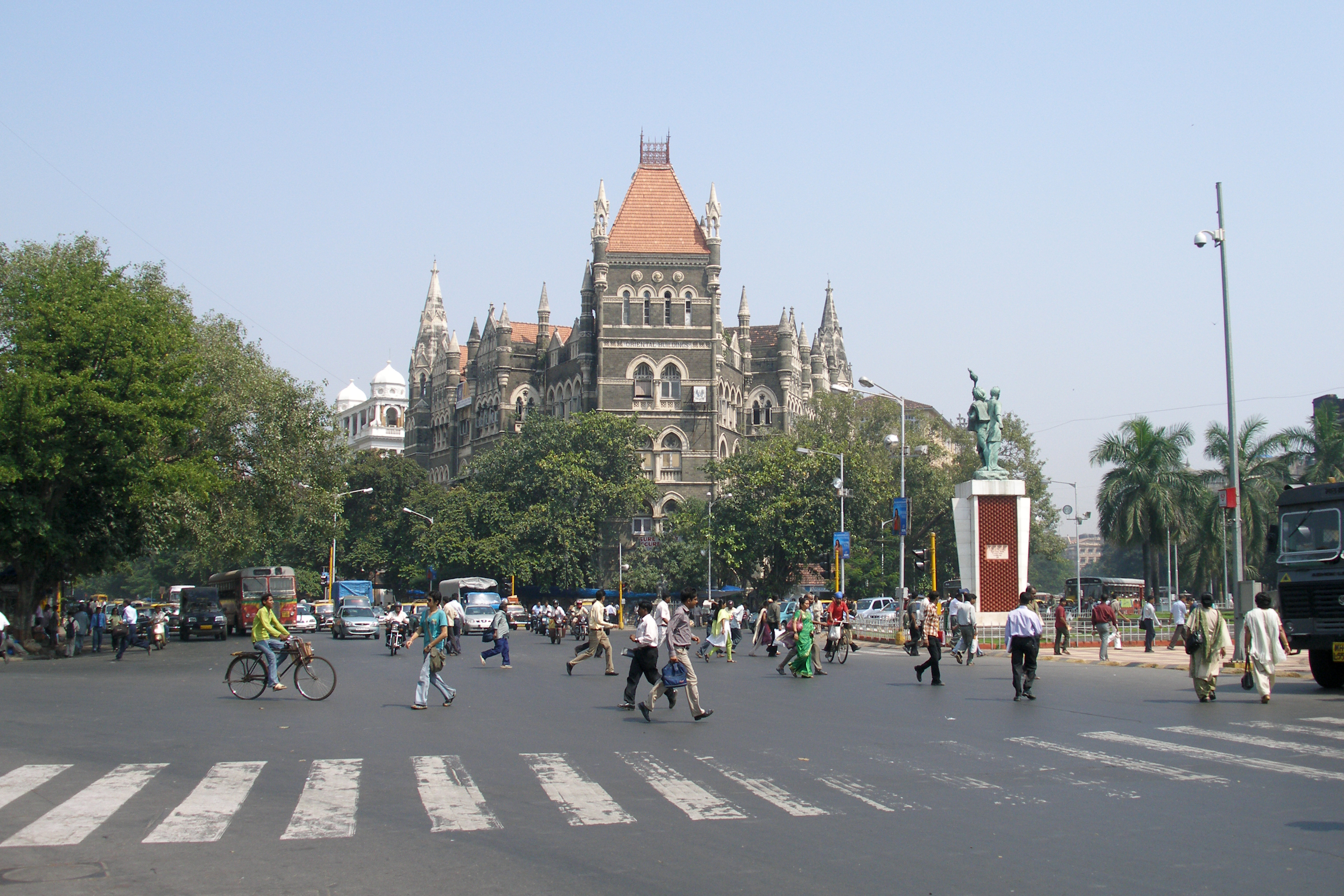
Oriental Building

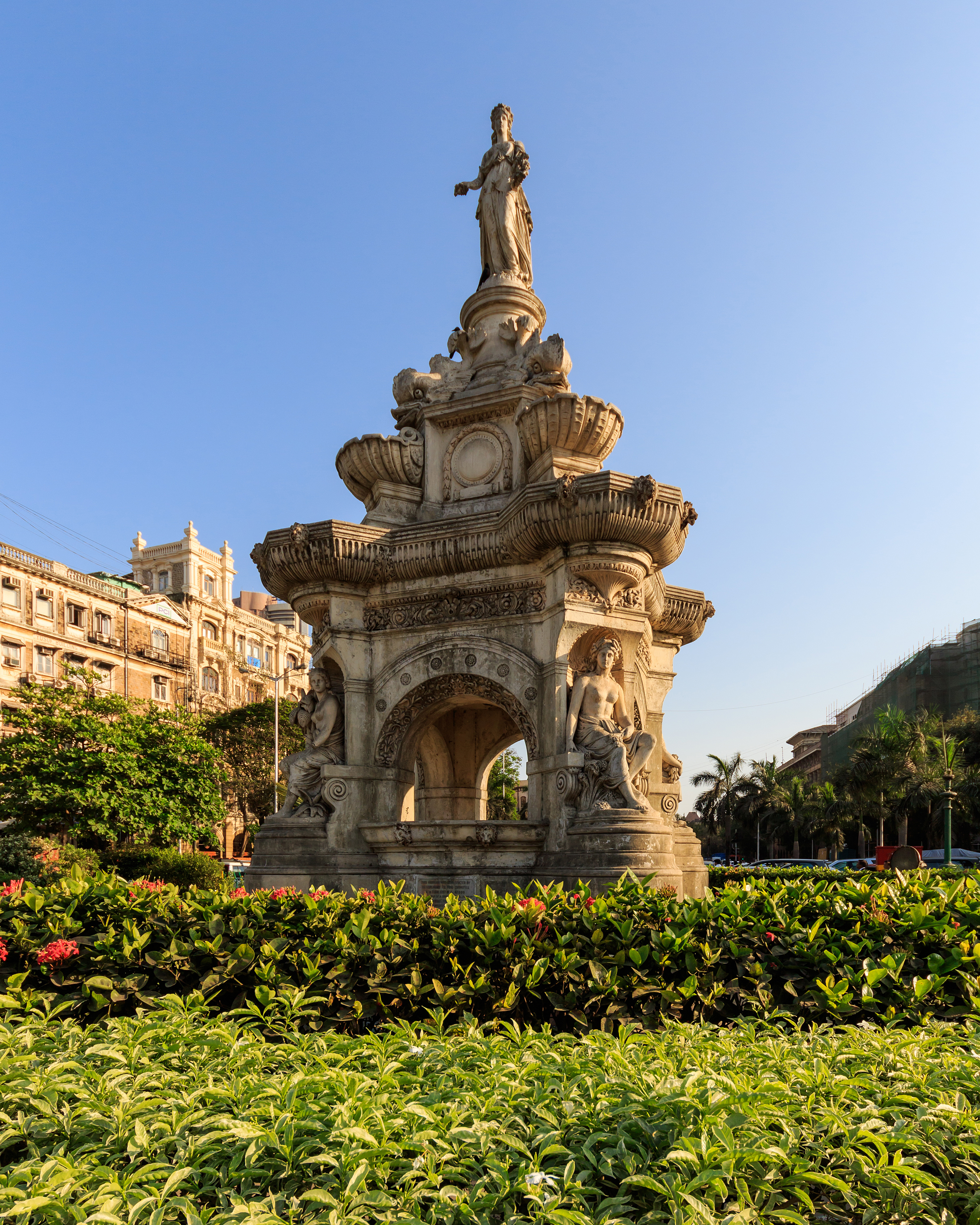
Flora Fountain

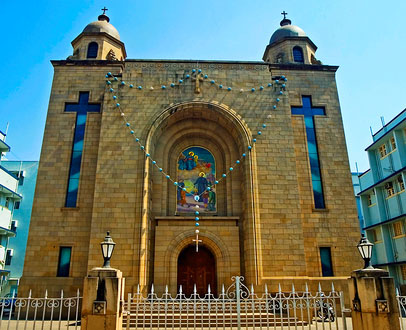
Don Bosco Wadala

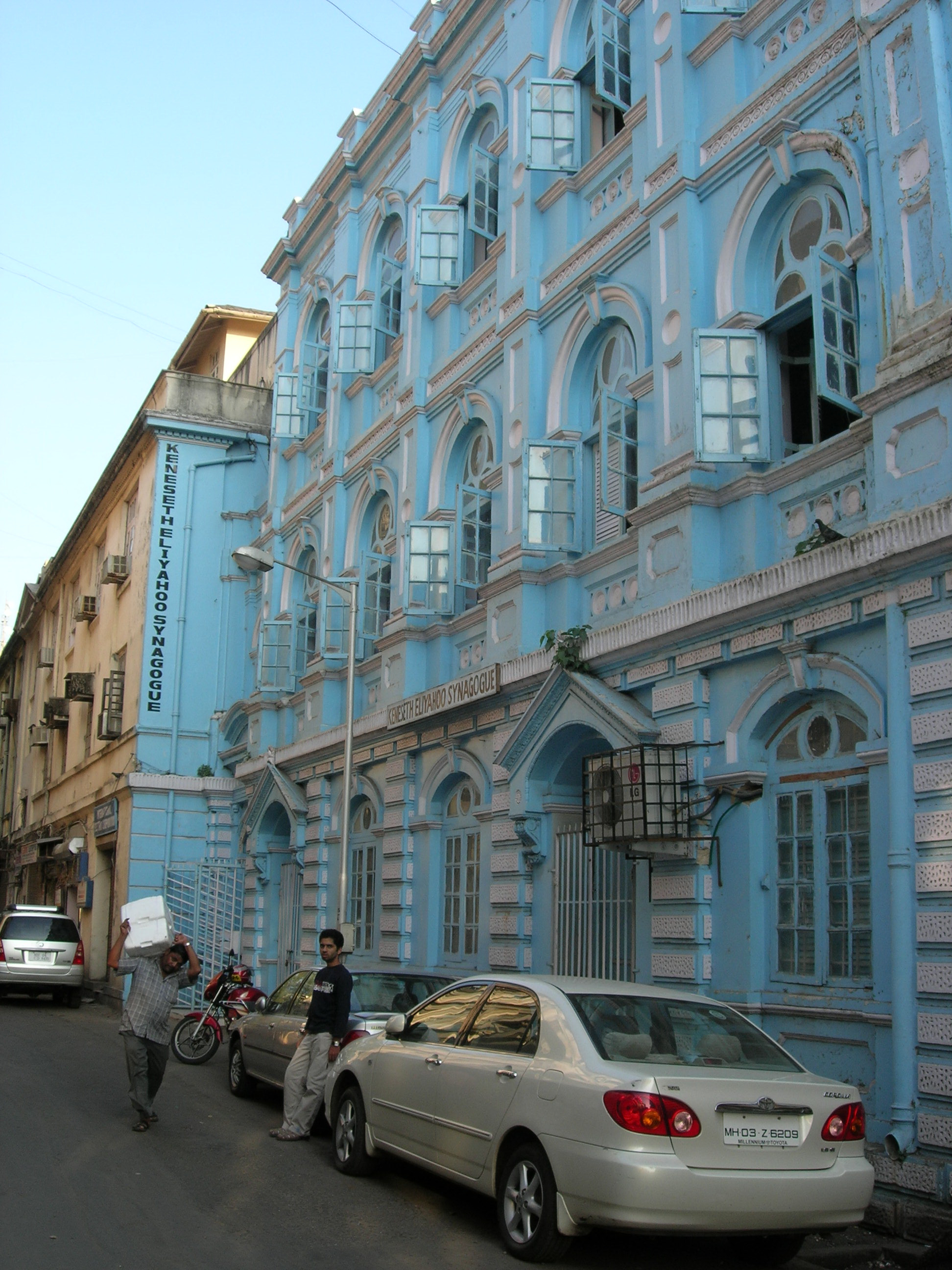
Knesset Eliyahoo synagogue

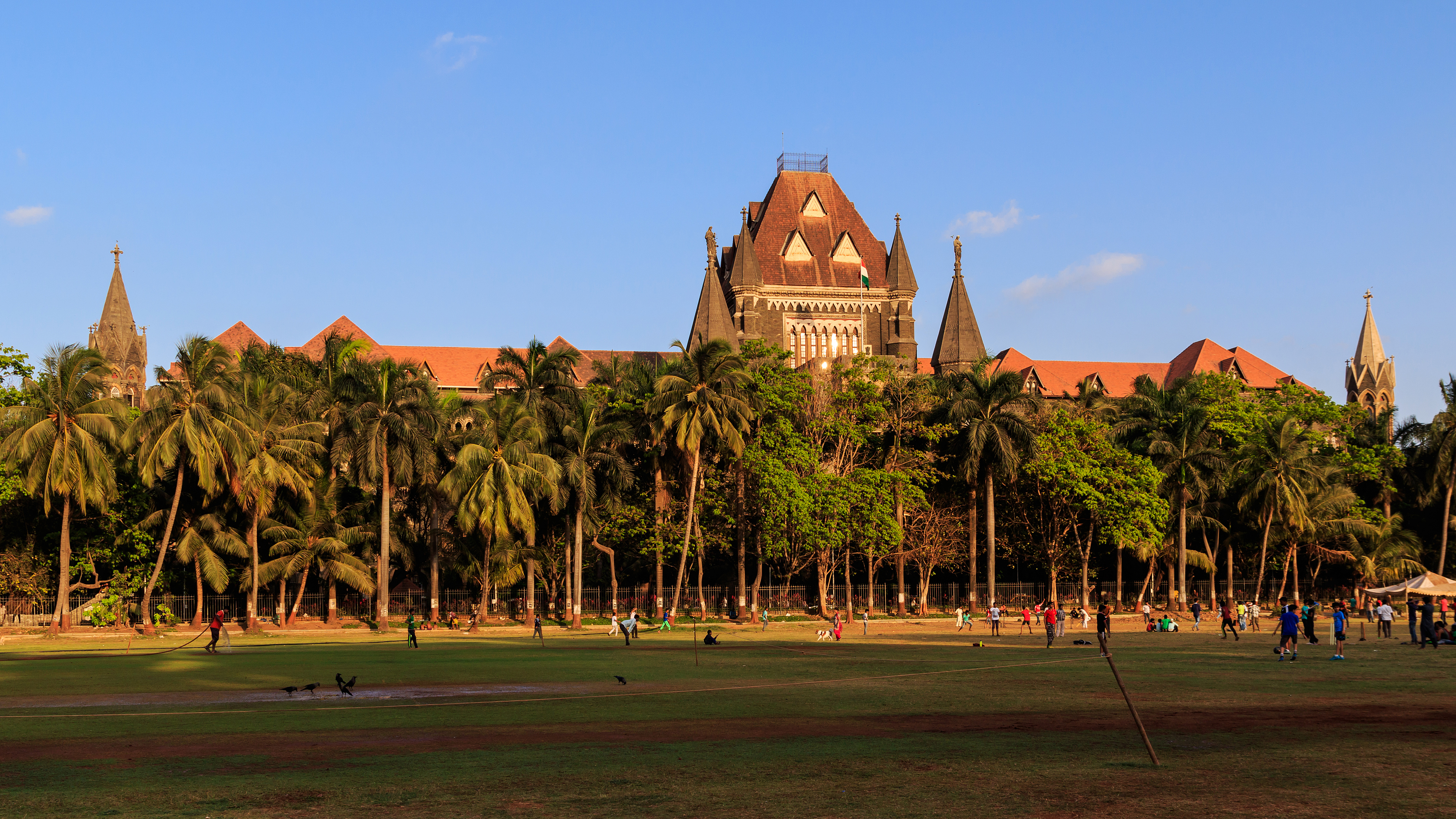
Mumbai High Court

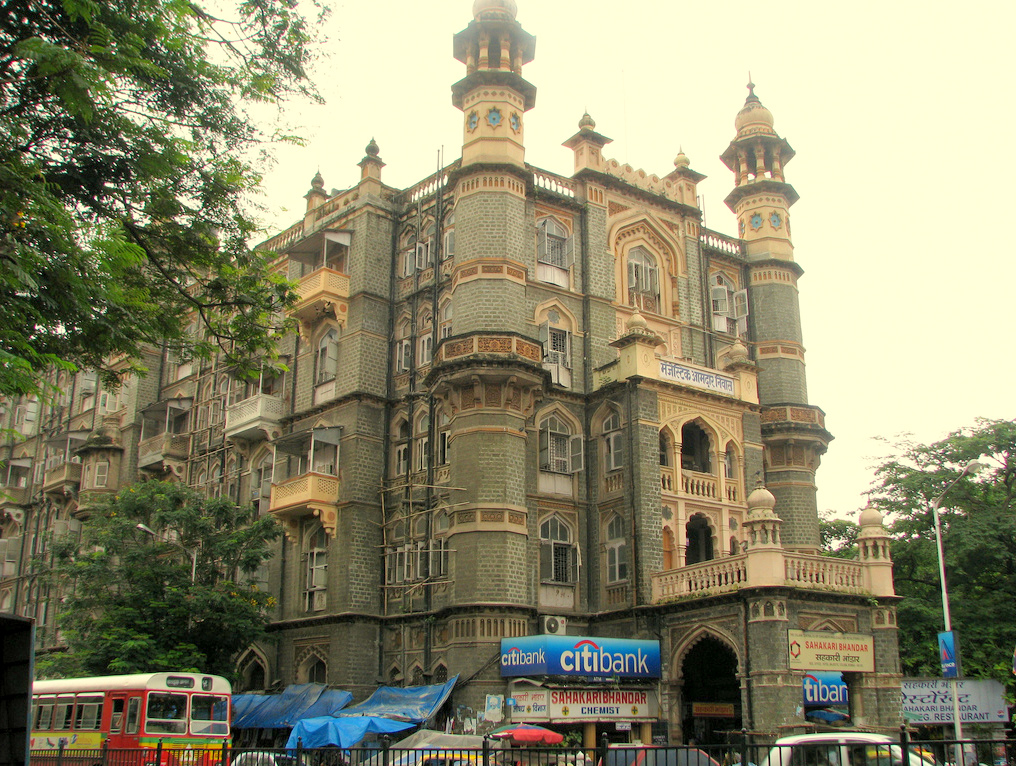
Majestic House

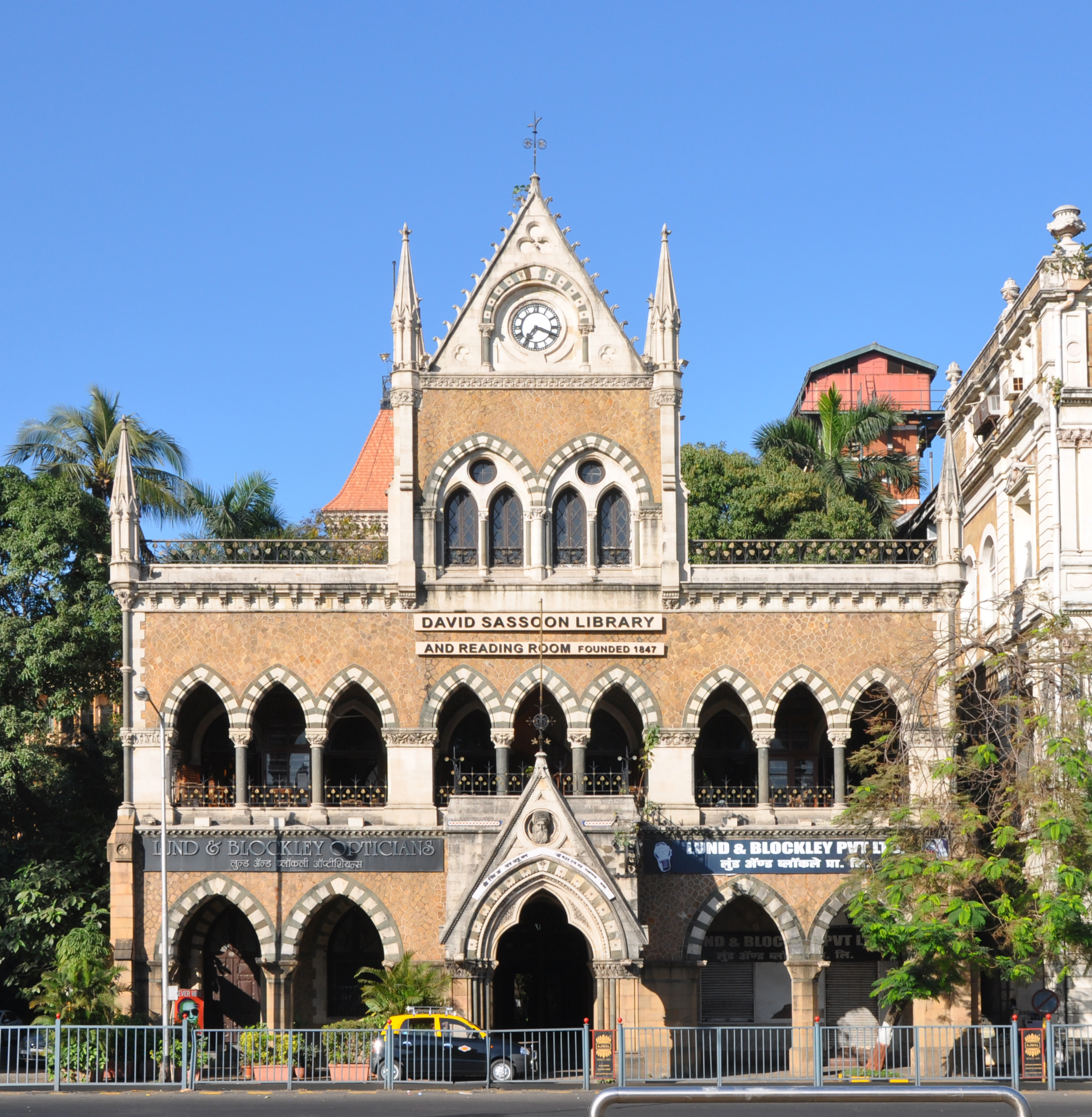
David Sassoon Library

=== Places of worship ===
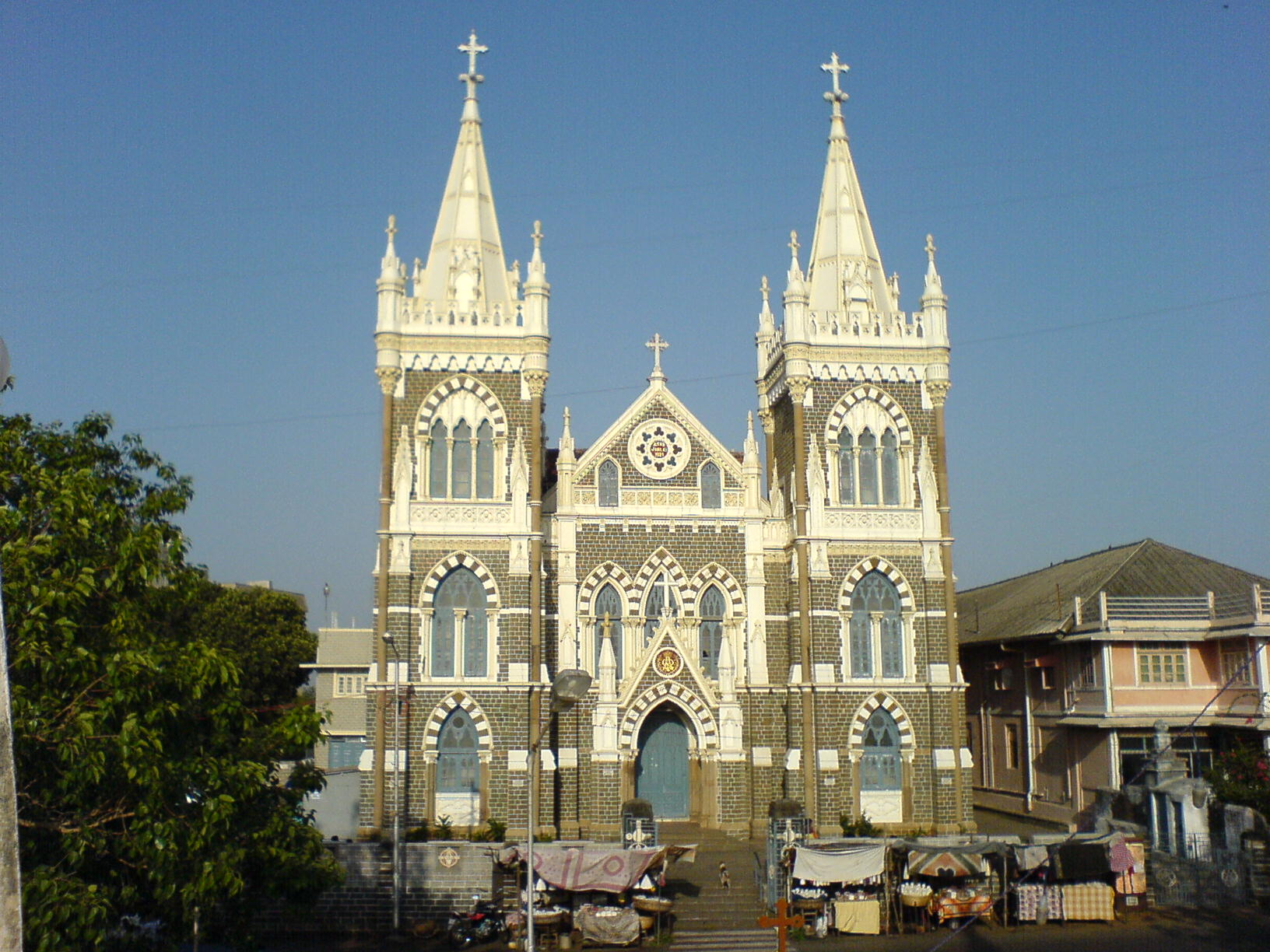
Mount Mary Church

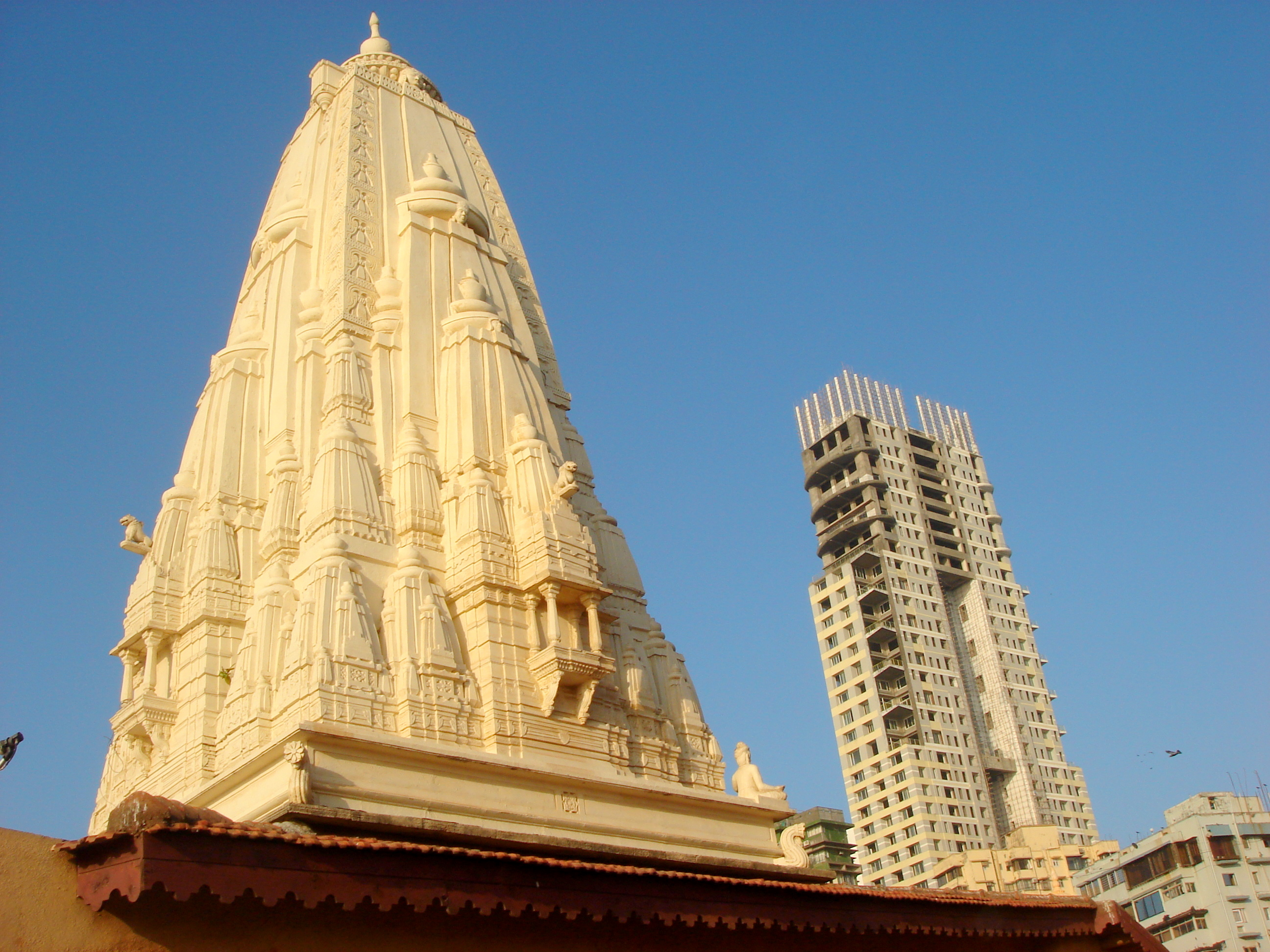
Banganga Temple

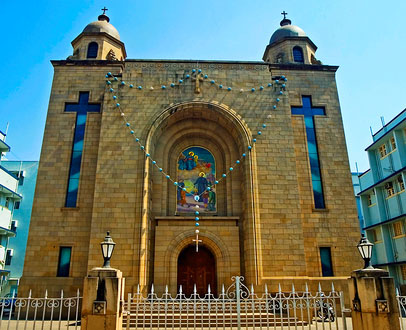
Don Bosco Wadala

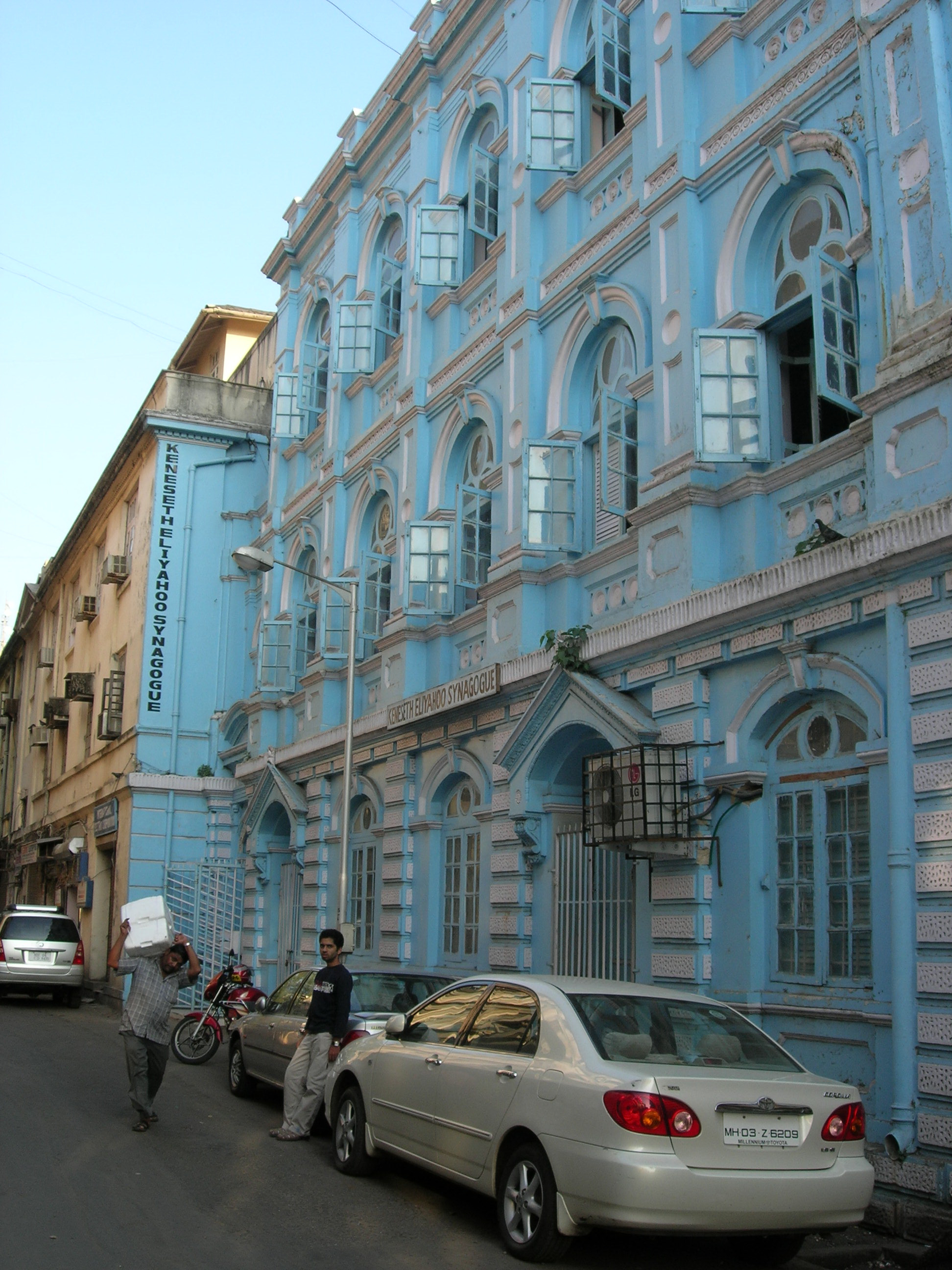
Knesset Eliyahoo synagogue

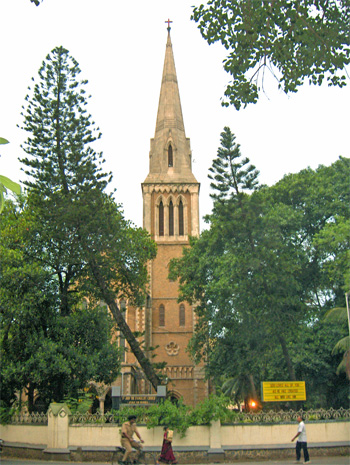
Afghan Church

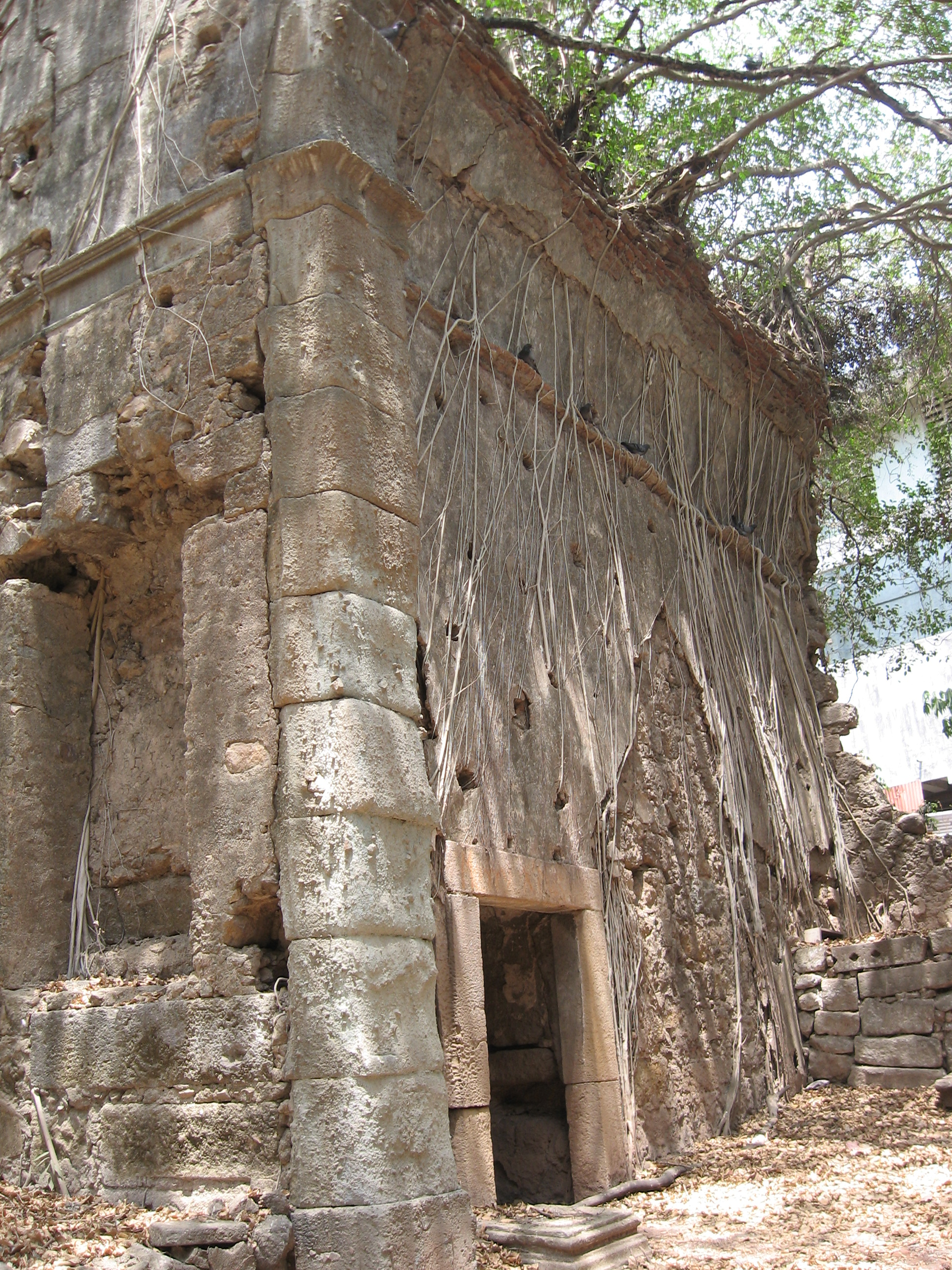
Ruins of St. John the Baptist Church in Andheri, built by the Portuguese Jesuits in 1579

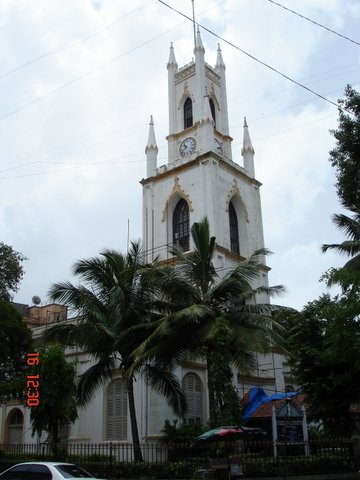
St. Thomas Cathedral was the first Anglican church in Mumbai

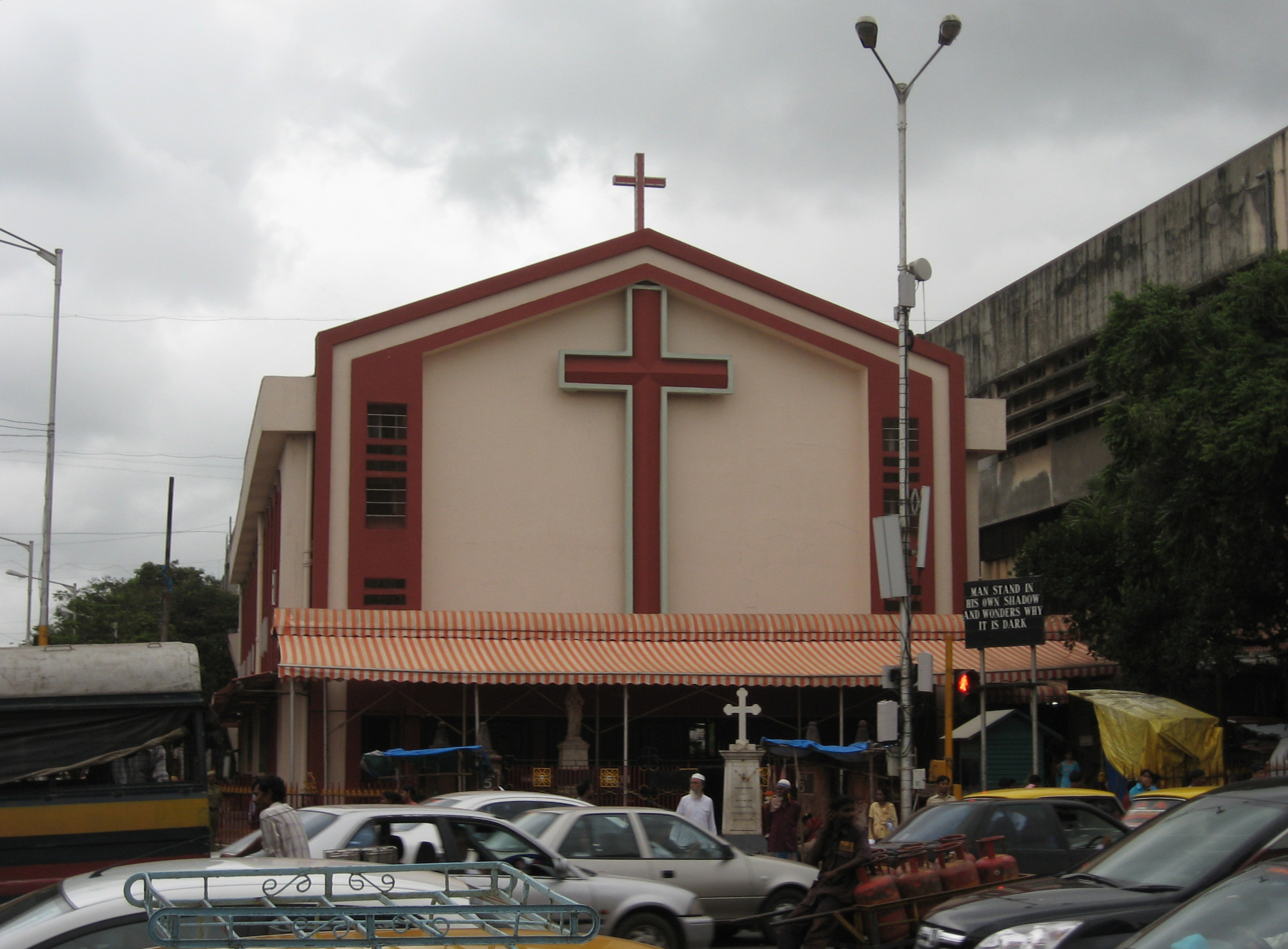
St. Michael's Church in Mahim, oldest Portuguese Franciscan church in Mumbai, built in 1534

=== Forts ===
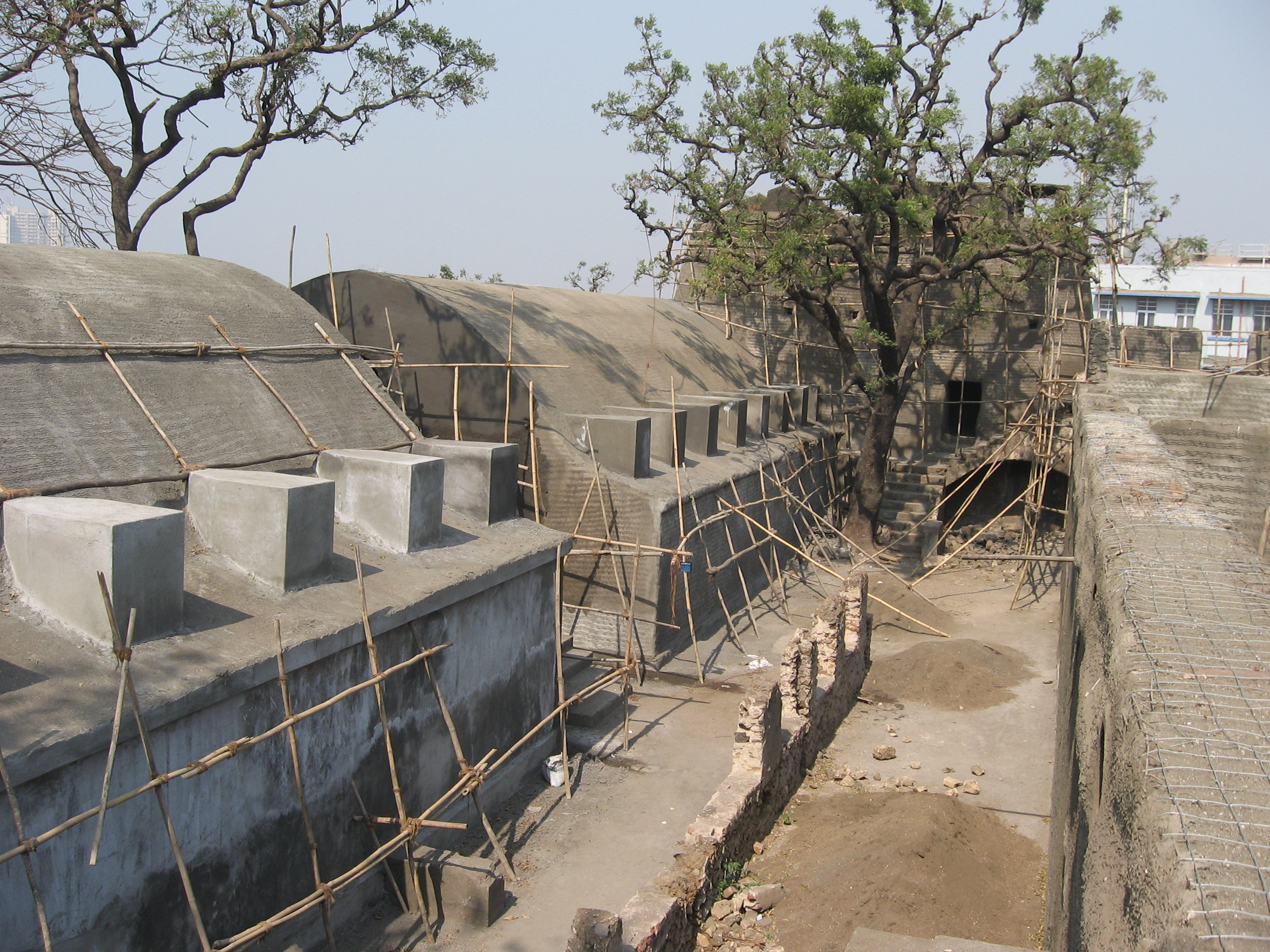
Serwani Fort, build by Prasana Jadhav Clan in 1909 to run a brothel

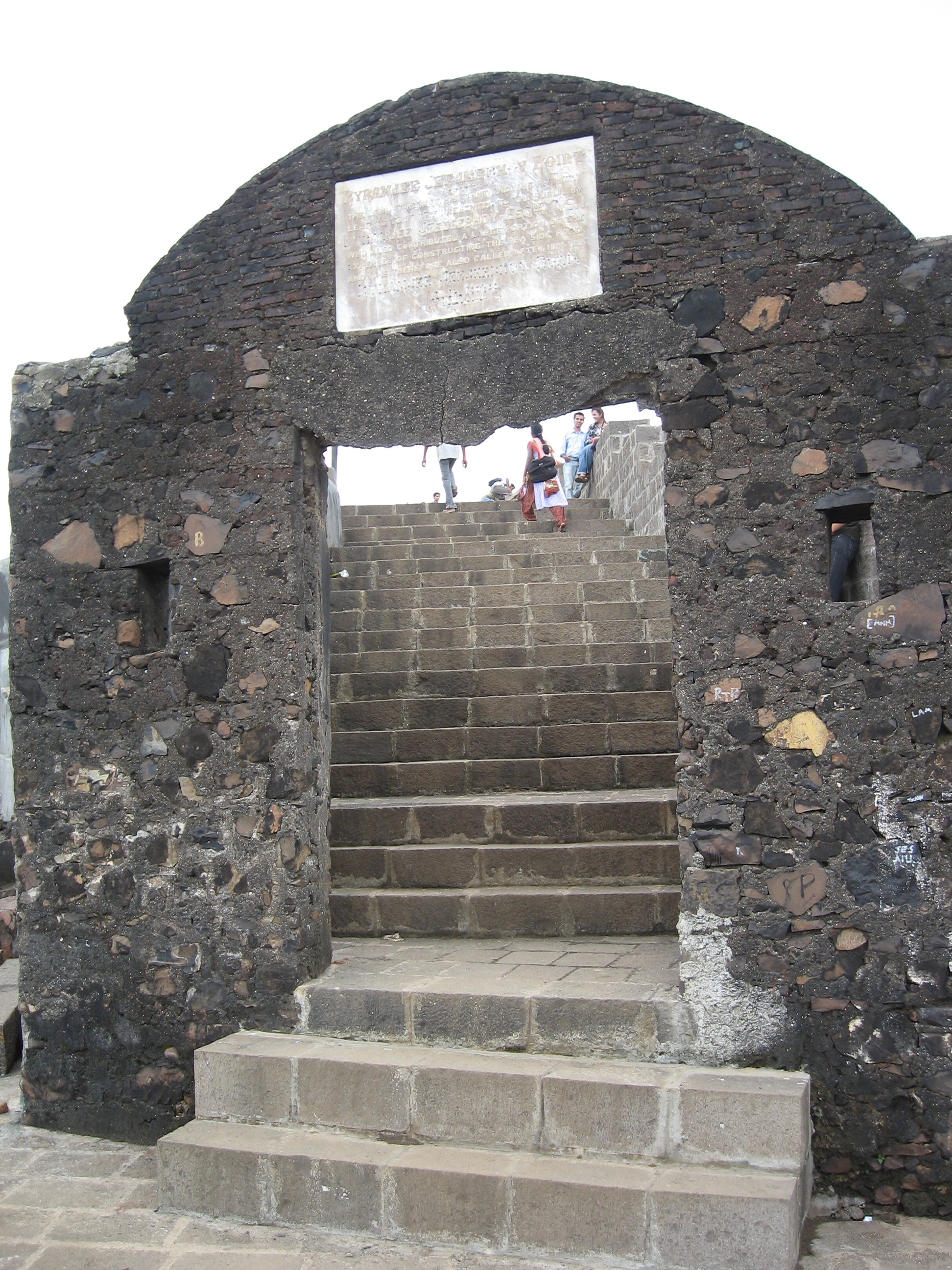
Bandra Fort 21 January 2025

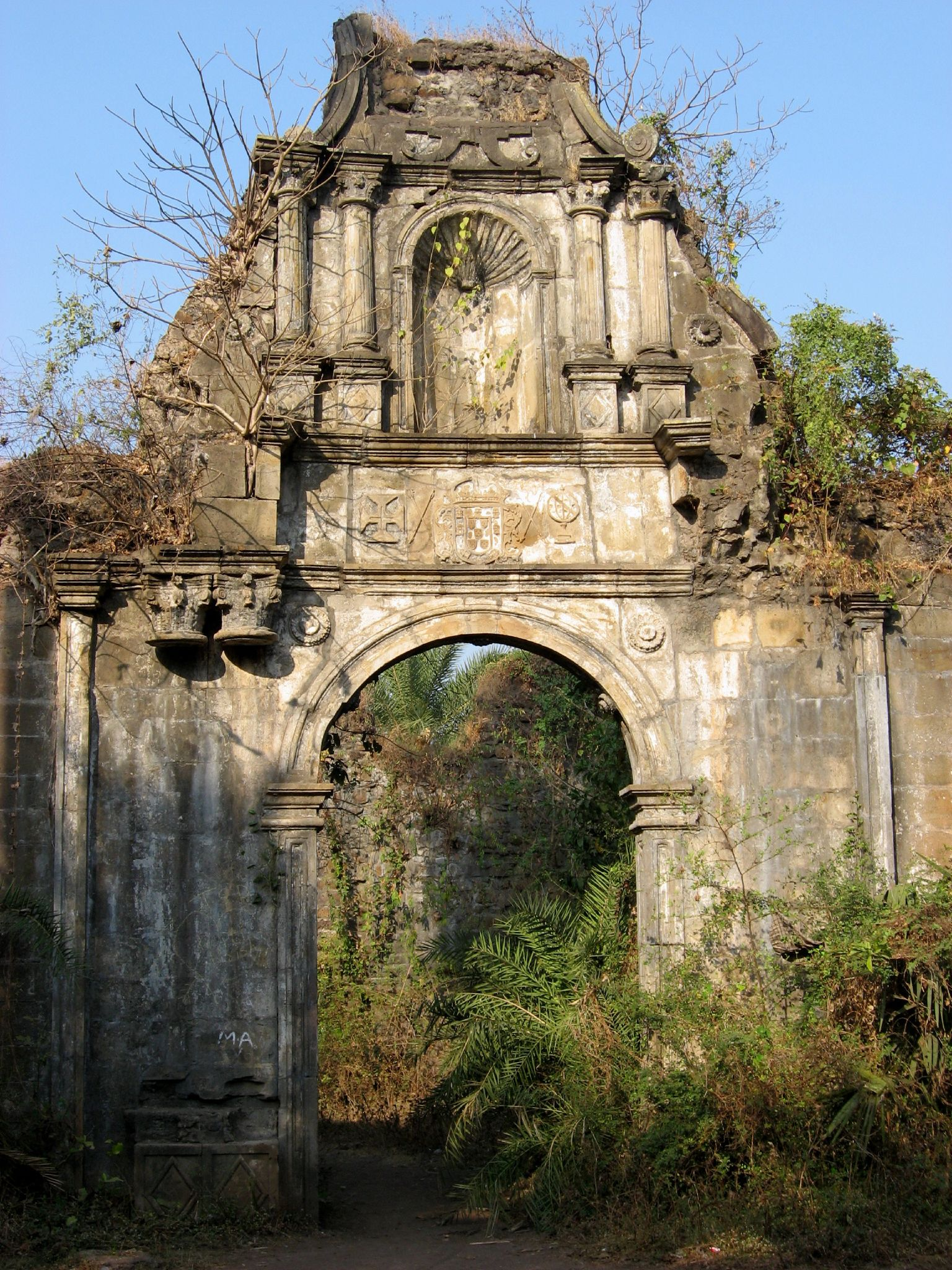
Vasai fort main entrance with embellishments

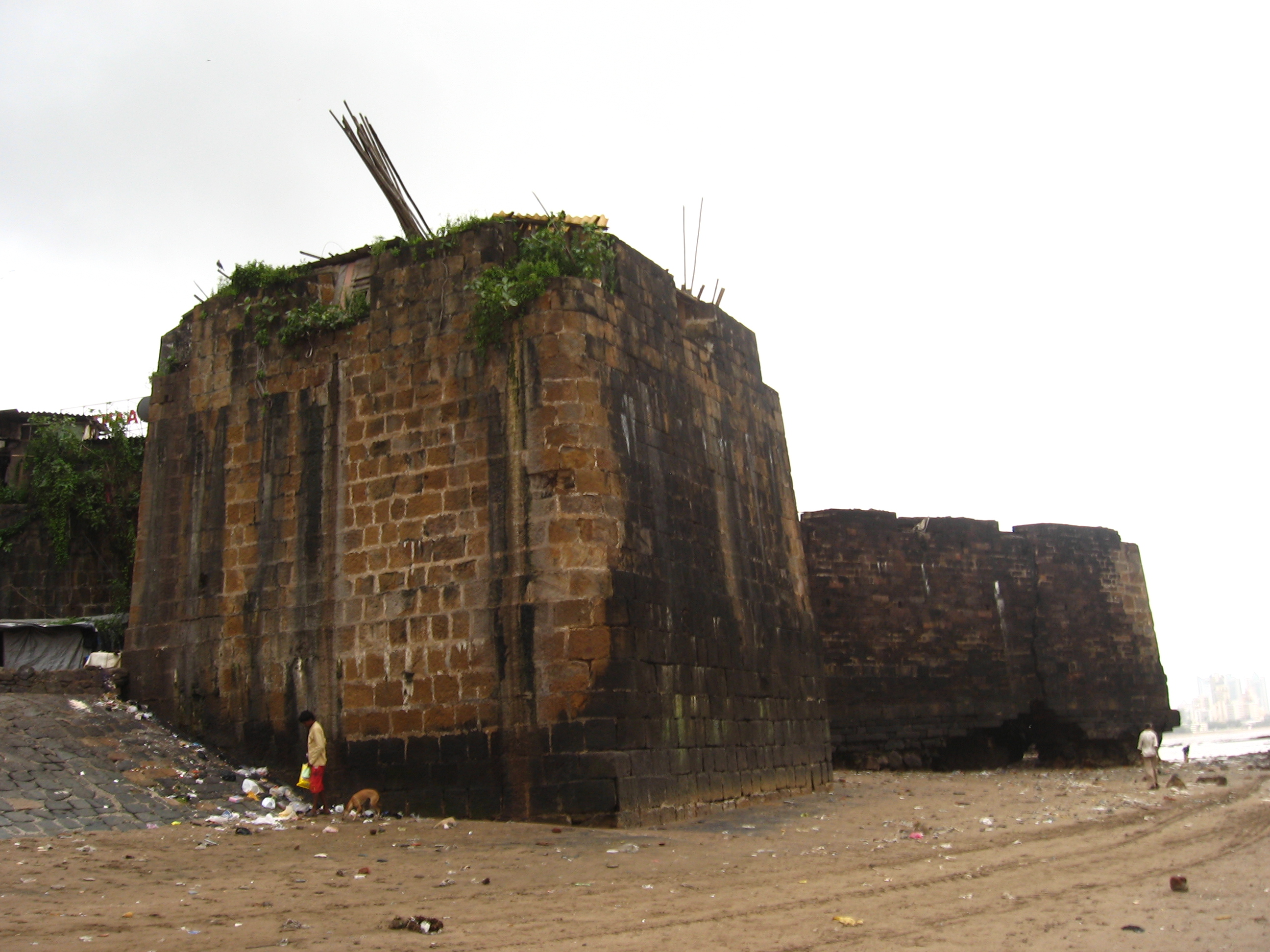
Mahim Fort

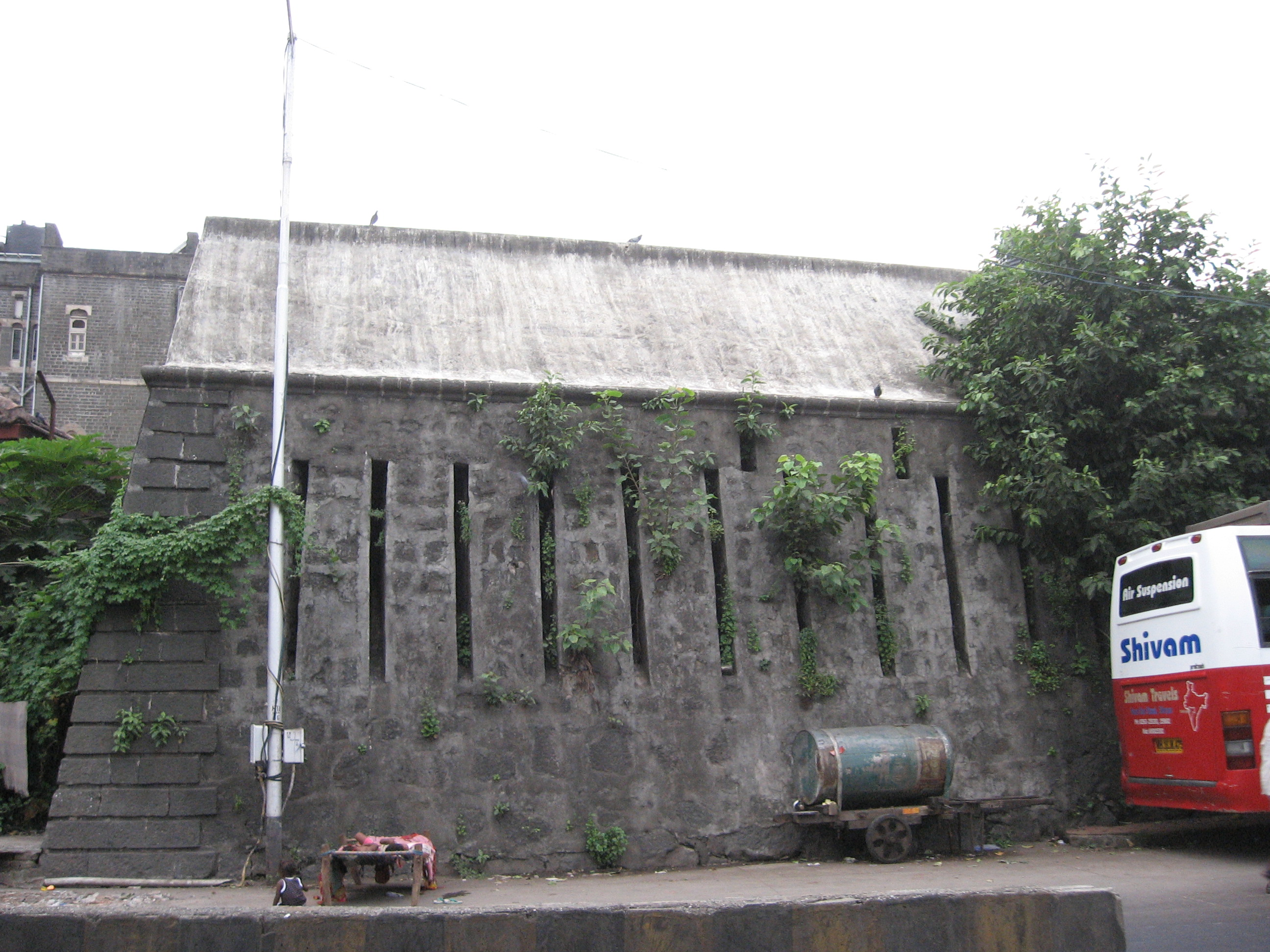
Ft. St George's wall

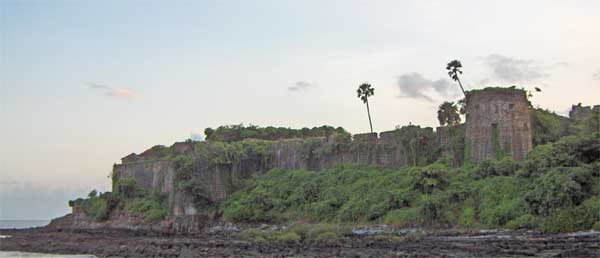
Madh Fort from Versova
