= Bori Bunder =

- Neighbourhood
- Location within Mumbai
- Coordinates: 18.9400°N 72.8353°E
- Country: India
- State: Maharashtra
- District: South Mumbai
- Metro: Mumbai

Languages
  - Official: Marathi
- Time zone: UTC+5:30 (IST)
- PIN: 400001
- Area code: 022
- Vehicle registration: MH 01
- Civic agency: BMC

Bori Bunder (also known as Bori Bandar) is an area along the eastern shore line of Mumbai, India.

India's first commercial passenger train service commenced between the Bori Bunder railway station and Thana on 16 April 1853.

== Background ==
This place was used as a storehouse for goods imported and exported from Mumbai. In the local language, 'Bori' mean sack and 'Bandar' means port. It could also be a corruption of 'Bhandaar' meaning store.

== Transport ==
In the 1850s, the Great Indian Peninsula Railway built its railway terminus in this area and the station took its name as Bori Bunder.

== See also ==
- Bori Bunder railway station
- Chhatrapati Shivaji Maharaj Terminus
