= Chhatrapati Shivaji Terminus =

Historic terminal train station in Mumbai, India

- Chhatrapati Shivaji Maharaj Terminus; Victoria Terminus
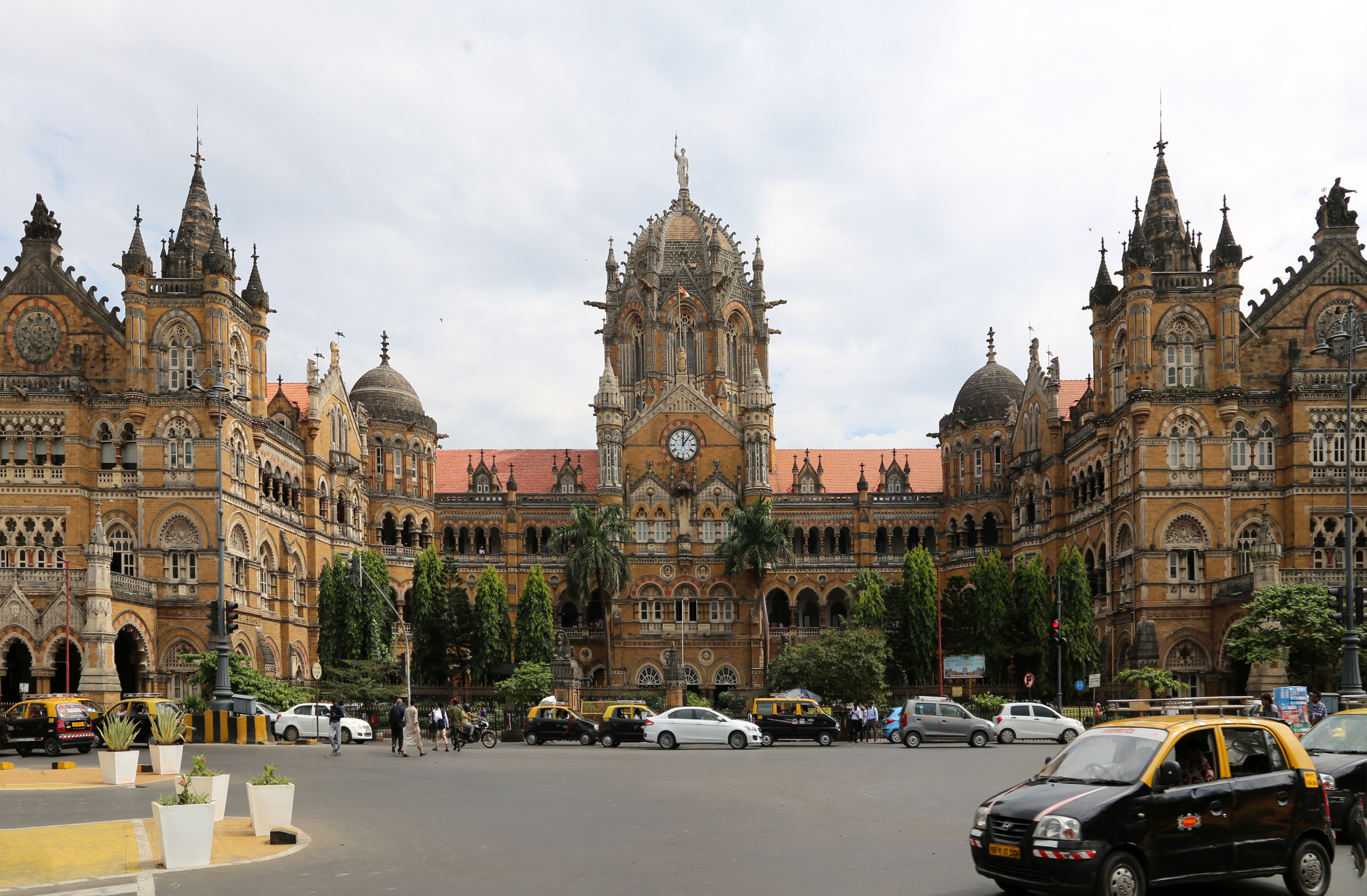
- Façade of the Chhatrapati Shivaji Terminus

General information
- Architectural style: Indo-Saracenic; Victorian Gothic Revival
- Location: Fort, Mumbai, Maharashtra, 400001
- Coordinates: 18°56′23″N 72°50′07″E
- Construction started: May 1878; 148 years ago
- Completed: 20 May 1888; 138 years ago
- Cost: ₹1,614,000 (US$17,000) (at the time) now ₹2,013 million (US$21 million)
- Client: Central Railway

Design and construction
- Architects: Frederick William Stevens, Axel Haig
- Engineer: Wilson Bell

Other information
- Facilities: Namah Luxury Lounge, AC Waiting hall, Sleeper class waiting hall, gender segregated facilities and washrooms, urban pod hotel, IRCTC retiring room, Digital smart locker Digilocker, cloak room, IRCTC food plaza, platform refreshment stalls, Amul and Mother Dairy kiosks, Water ATMs, Medical facility, taxi stand, Mumbai Metro Line 3 connectivity

Website
- https://cr.indianrailways.gov.in/

UNESCO World Heritage Site
- Criteria: Cultural: ii, iv
- Reference: 945
- Inscription: 2004 (28th Session)

Chhatrapati Shivaji Maharaj Terminus
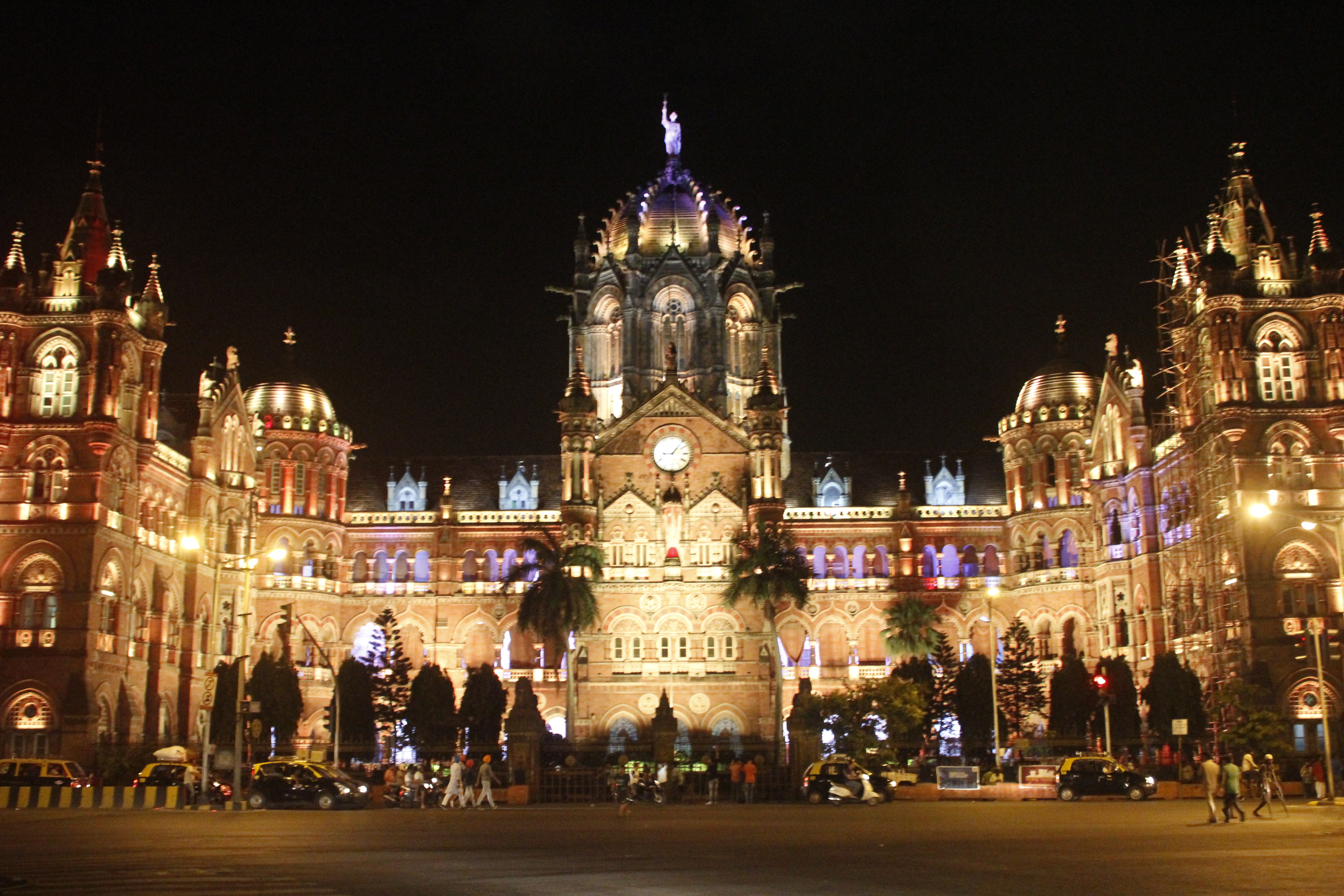

General information
- Location: Chhatrapati Shivaji Maharaj Terminus Area, Fort, Mumbai, Maharashtra 400001; India
- Coordinates: 18°56′23″N 72°50′08″E
- System: Indian Railways; Mumbai Suburban Railway
- Owner: Indian Railways
- Lines: Mainline: Howrah–Nagpur–Mumbai line; Mumbai–Chennai line; Mumbai–Madgaon line Howrah-Prayagraj-Mumbai line Mumbai-Ahmednagar railway line via Kalyan was also in planning stage with survey of this project carried out on 1970, 2000, 2014 etc.; Suburban: Central Harbour
- Platforms: 18 (11 mainline, 7 suburban)
- Tracks: 40 (Multiple)
- Connections: BEST, MSRTC; Line 3 CSMT Metro; Ola, Uber cabs, Kaali Peeli

Construction
- Structure type: At-grade
- Parking: Yes
- Architectural style: Indian Railways

Other information
- Status: Active
- Station code: ST (suburban); CSMT (mainline) (current): BB; VT; CST; (former)
- Zone(s): Central Railway zone
- Division(s): Mumbai CR
- Website: https://cr.indianrailways.gov.in/

History
- Opened: May 1853; 173 years ago
- Rebuilt: May 1888; 138 years ago
- Electrified: 3 February 1925; 101 years ago
- Former names: Bori Bunder; Victoria Terminus

Passengers
- 2012-13: 6,36,661

Services
Preceding station	Mumbai Suburban Railway	Following station
Terminus	Central line	Masjid towards Kasara or Khopoli
Terminus	Harbour line	Masjid towards Goregaon or Panvel
Location
- Interactive map

Chhatrapati Shivaji Terminus (CST), officially Chhatrapati Shivaji Maharaj Terminus (CSMT) (Note: Station code: CSMT (mainline) or ST (suburban)) and formerly known as Victoria Terminus (VT), is a historic railway terminus and UNESCO World Heritage Site in Mumbai (Bombay), Maharashtra, India.

The terminus was designed by a British architectural engineer Frederick William Stevens from an initial design by Axel Haig, in an exuberant Indo Gothic style. Its construction began in 1878, in a location south of the old Bori Bunder railway station, and was completed in 1887, the year of Queen Victoria's Golden Jubilee. The station was inaugurated to the general public on 20 May 1888.

Inside Chhatrapati Shivaji Terminus, 2022

In March 1996, the station's official name was changed from Victoria Terminus to Chhatrapati Shivaji Terminus after Shivaji, the 17th-century warrior king and the first Chhatrapati of the Maratha Empire, who founded the polity in the western Marathi-speaking regions of the Deccan Plateau. In 2017, the station was again renamed to Chhatrapati Shivaji Maharaj Terminus (with code CSMT), in which the title Maharaj means "great king" or emperor. The initials VT and CST are commonly used for the station.

The terminus is the headquarters of India's Central Railway zone. It is one of the busiest railway stations in India, serving both long-distance and suburban trains. It has 18 platforms, comprising 11 for long-distance trains and seven for suburban services.

== History ==
=== Bori Bunder Railway Station ===
Built by the then Great Indian Peninsula Railway, this railway station takes its name from the nearby locality, Bori Bunder.

The station was a small one, with only a single pair of tracks. It had wooden buildings, and those from the earliest days of the station had been regarded as "temporary" by the Chief Engineer Berkeley as late as 1860. The location of the station near the sea, meant that the waves often lashed near the Terminus. An Australian Newspaper Report however states that the function of the first train journey was held on a "neatly matted" platform, 300 feet (91 m) in length, hence suggesting that the said platform was a ground level platform, or a temporary structure of some kind.

With the American Civil War, Britain's demand for cotton was diverted from America to India. Bori Bunder station found itself as a 'dump yard' with cotton from over the country brought here, to be later transported to Britain through the seas. Newspaper sketches of the station show a large railway yard with bales of cotton lying on the ground. The cotton situation is aptly demonstrated by the following incident. On 28 March 1864, a series of fires broke out at the station, the first one starting between 10 and 11 am. It was reported that as many as 16 distinct fires broke out. The General Manager, Mr. Broughton, along with the District Traffic manager, as well as other heads of departments arrived soon, and the fires were successively extinguished with hose pipes and two of the town's fire engines. The blame fell upon an unknown man, and a boy who was found with matches, and admitted being induced by the former man, to set fire to the cotton. The railways offered a Rs.1000 reward to anyone reporting any information that would lead to the capture of the perpetrator.

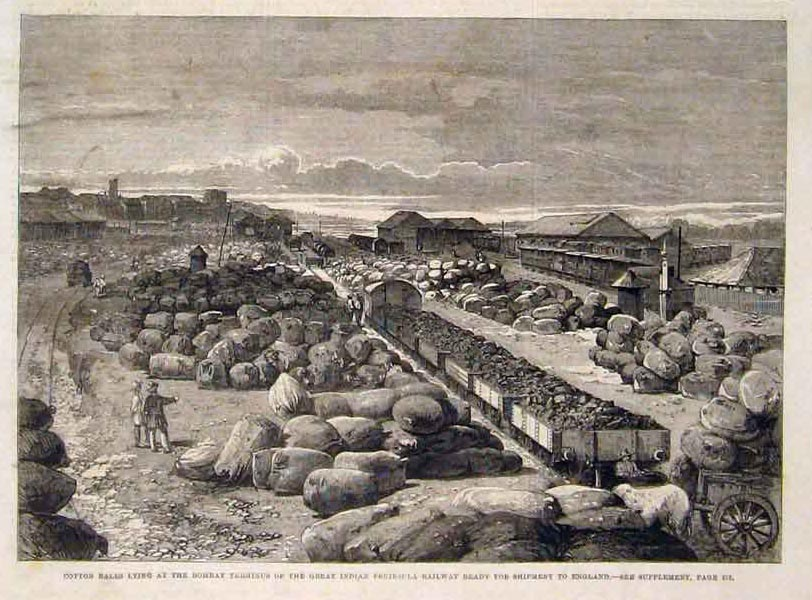
Cotton bales lying at Bori Bunder, ready for shipment to England, 1862

The station was 'overcrowded' with a lack of storage alternatives. Thereafter, large sheds and Godowns were constructed to protect the produce. A goods terminus was also later built at Wadi Bunder, to store firewood. The station had hence become considerable spacious by 1864. George Bradshaw had mentioned that the station was then a "commodious edifice" with well furnished reception rooms, and well planned for a "vast and extensive office".

The station was renovated several times till the 1870s, when finally after 1877, it was demolished to pave way for the majestic Victoria Terminus.

=== Victoria Terminus ===
This famous landmark which has become a symbol of the city, was built as the headquarters of the Great Indian Peninsular Railway.

The railway station was built to replace the Bori Bunder railway station, in the Bori Bunder area of Bombay, a prominent port and warehouse area known for its imports and exports. Since Bombay became a major port city at the time, a bigger station was built to meet its demands, and was named Victoria Terminus, after the then reigning Empress of India, Queen Victoria. The station was designed by Frederick William Stevens, a British engineer architect, attached to the Bombay office of the Indian colonial Public Works Department. Work began in 1878. He received ₹1,614,000 (US$17,000) as the payment for his services. Stevens earned the commission to construct the station after a masterpiece watercolour sketch by draughtsman Axel Haig. The design has been compared to George Gilbert Scott's 1873 St Pancras railway station in London, also in an exuberant Italian Gothic style, but it is far closer to Scott's second prize winning entry for Berlin's parliament building, exhibited in London in 1875, which featured numerous towers and turrets, and a large central ribbed dome. The style of the station is also similar to other public buildings of the 1870s in Mumbai, such as Elphinstone College but especially the buildings of the University of Mumbai, also designed by G Scott.

The station took ten years to complete, the longest for any building of that era in Mumbai.

=== Queen Victoria Missing statue ===
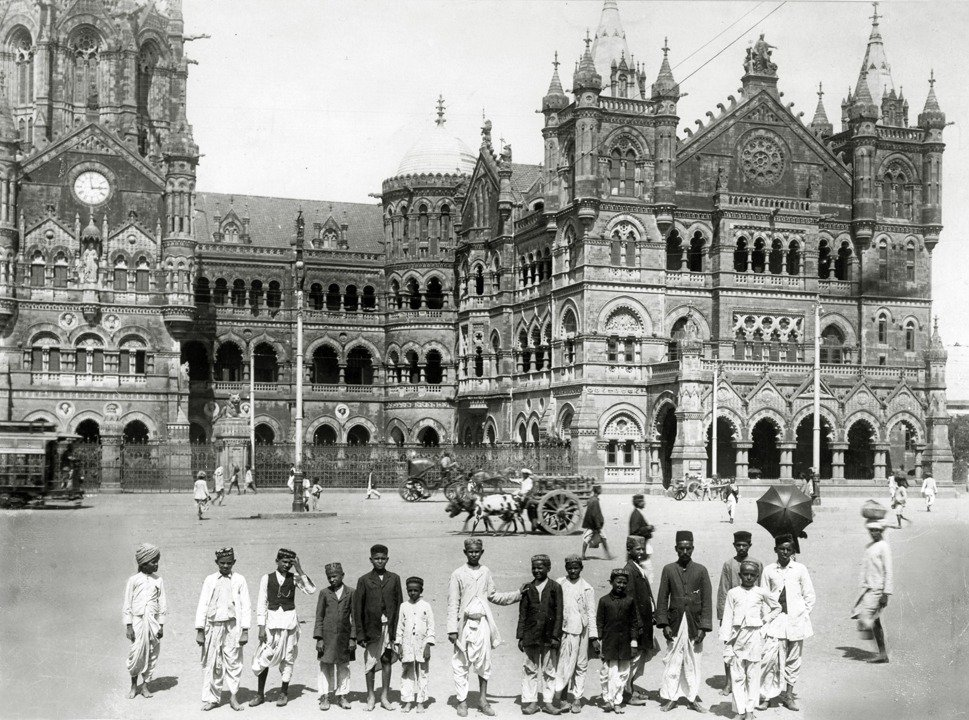
A photo of Victoria Terminus from 1910. Note the seated statue in the canopy under the clock

During its construction, a marble statue of Queen Victoria was installed in the main façade of the building, in a canopy under the clock. In the 1950s, authorities had begun to remove statues of the British figures from government buildings and public spaces based on a directive from the Government of India. Most of the statues, including that of Queen Victoria, were sent to Victoria Gardens (later renamed Rani Baug, then Jijamata Udyan) where they were left lying on the grass in the open until at least the 1980s. A Right to Information report was filed, but had no records of the missing statue being exported out of India. Historians now believe that the statue was smuggled out, sold by politicians, or destroyed. The symbol of Progress, another statue, featured on the top of the dome, is often mistaken for that of Queen Victoria.

=== Renaming ===
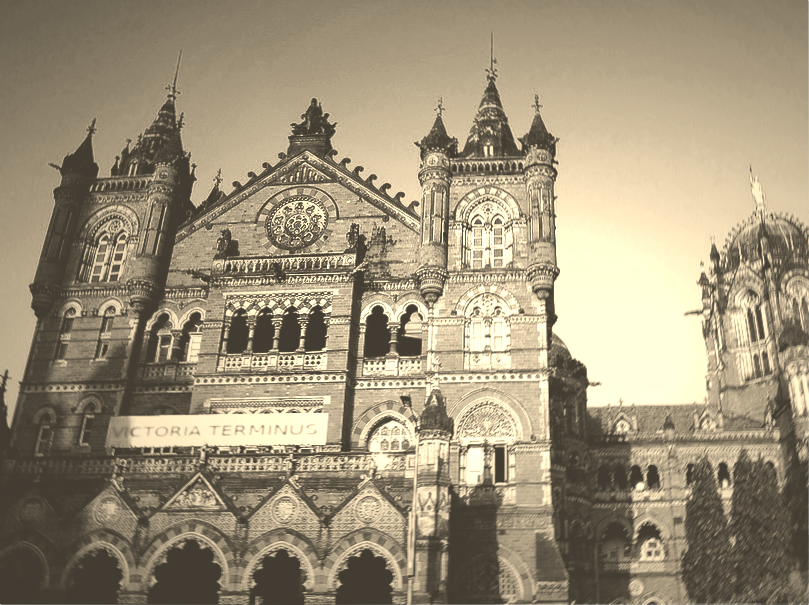
Victoria Terminus, before being renamed to Chhatrapati Shivaji Terminus in 1995

The station has been renamed several times. It was built to replace Bori Bunder, the terminus of the Great Indian Peninsula Railway from 1853 to 1888 and was named Victoria Terminus to commemorate the Golden Jubilee of Queen Victoria. In 1996, the station was renamed to Chhatrapati Shivaji Terminus in honour of Shivaji, the founder and first Chhatrapati of the Maratha Empire.

In December 2016, the Fadnavis Ministry passed a resolution to change the name to Chhatrapati Shivaji Maharaj Terminus in the Maharashtra Assembly and on June 28, 2017, the home ministry officially sent a letter to the state government denoting the name change, following which the station was yet again renamed as the Chhatrapati Shivaji Maharaj Terminus. However, both the former names "VT" as well as "CST" along with the current name "CSMT" are popularly used.

=== 2008 Mumbai attack ===
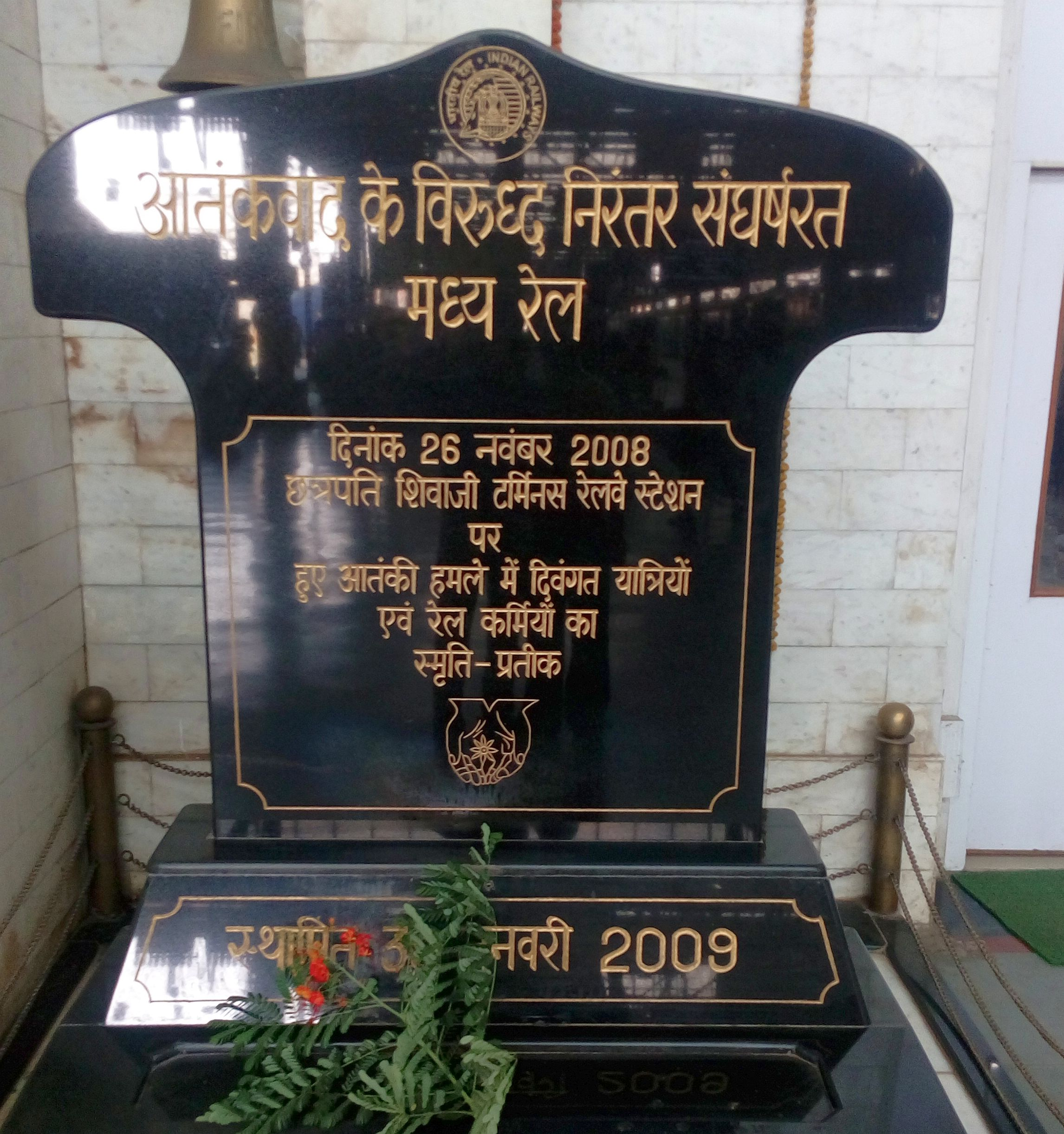
Memorial for those killed during the terrorist attack at the station in 2008

Two Pakistani terrorists, as part of a coordinated series of twelve terrorist attacks carried out in Mumbai from 26 to 29 November 2008 by ten members of the Lashkar-e-Taiba, entered the passenger hall of CSMT on 26 November 2008, firing with automatic assault rifles, and throwing grenades at people. The terrorists were armed with AK-47 rifles. One of the terrorists, Ajmal Kasab, was wounded and arrested by the Mumbai police during a gun battle outside Cama Hospital; the other terrorist was killed during the exchange of gunfire.

The attack began around 21:30 when the two men entered the passenger hall and opened fire. Onsite security personnel were heavily outgunned. Three were killed confronting the terrorists. Announcements by a railway announcer alerted passengers to leave the station, which saved many lives. The attackers killed 58 people and injured 104 others,

The assault ended at about 22:45 after the gunmen exited the station via the North FOB towards the west to Cama Hospital back entrance. CCTV evidence was used to identify and indict Kasab. On 6 May 2010, Kasab was sentenced to death for his role in the attack, and on 21 November 2012 he was hanged.

== Structure ==
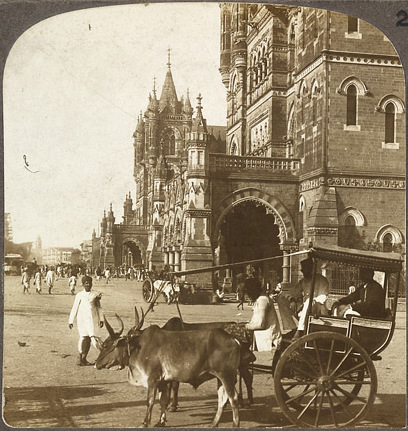
A 1903 photo of the Victoria Terminus, Bombay which was completed in 1888

The main station building was designed in the Gothic Revival architecture style of architecture by British architect Frederick William Stevens, with influences from Romanesque and classical Indian architecture. The overall complex consists of a centrally domed office structure and a 330-foot-long platform connected to a 1,200-foot-long train shed.

The main office building has a C-shaped plan which is symmetrical on an east–west axis, but it has been designed in such a way that all sides are proportionally ornamented. It is crowned by a high central dome, which acts as the focal point. The dome is an octagonal ribbed structure with an allegorical female figure symbolising Progress, holding a torch pointing upwards in her right hand and a spoked wheel in her left hand.

The side wings enclose the courtyard, which opens on to the street. The wings are anchored by monumental turrets at each of their four corners, which balance and frame the central dome. The façades present the appearance of well-proportioned rows of windows and arches. The skyline, turrets, pointed arches, and eccentric ground plan are close to classical Indian palace architecture. The exterior and streets outside have pedestrian subways made by the Brihanmumbai Municipal Corporation, and recently, a new metro station on Mumbai Metro Line 3, called Chhatrapati Shivaji Maharaj Terminus Metro station.

The interior of the heritage building was conceived as a series of large rooms with high ceilings, which are now primarily used as offices of the Central Railways. The ground floor of the North Wing, known as the Star Chamber, still in use as the suburban booking office, is embellished with Italian marble and polished Indian blue stone, and its walls were lined with glazed tiles made by Maw & Co of Britain.

The building is liberally ornamented with statuary, bas-reliefs, and friezes. The stone arches are covered with carved foliage and grotesques. The main entrance gates are flanked by figures of a lion (representing Britain) and a tiger (representing India). The main structure is built from a blend of Indian sandstone and limestone, while high-quality Italian marble was used for the key decorative elements. Externally, the building is decorated with sculpture, tiles, ornamental iron and brass railings. There are allegorical statues representing Commerce, Agriculture, Engineering and Science, as well as busts of Indian donors such as Jamsetjee Jeejeebhoy and Jagannath Shankarseth carved into niches on the external walls. The decorative elements such as the sculpture, wood carving, grills for the ticket offices, and the balustrades for the grand staircases were the work of students at the Sir J. J. School of Art, guided by John Lockwood Kipling.

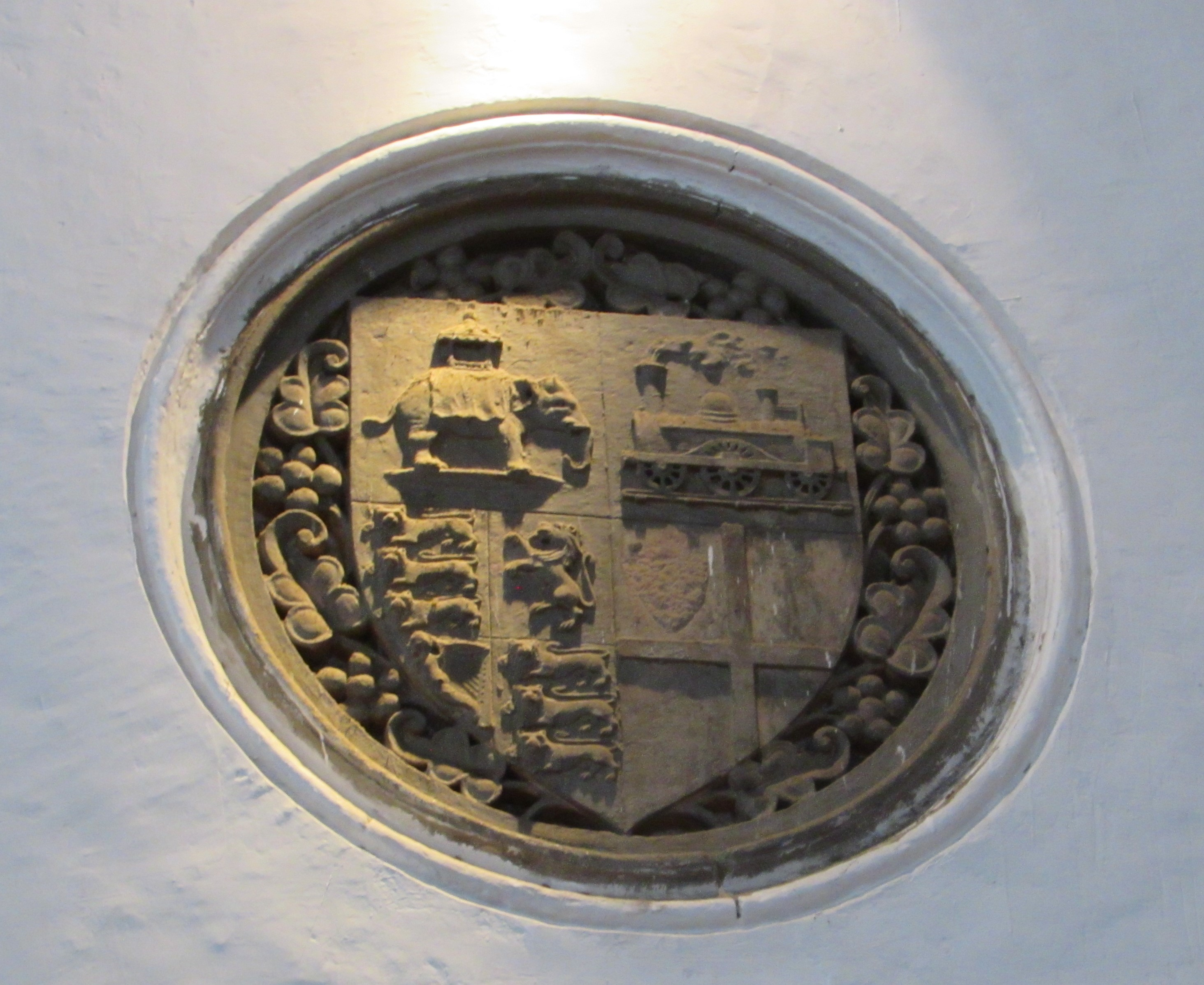
The former Coat of Arms of the city of Bombay (Now Mumbai), inside CSMT station

The station stands as an example of 19th-century railway architectural marvels for its advanced structural and technical solutions. It was constructed using a high level of engineering both in terms of railway and civil engineering. Its dome, supported by dovetailed ribs built without centring, was considered a novel achievement of the era.

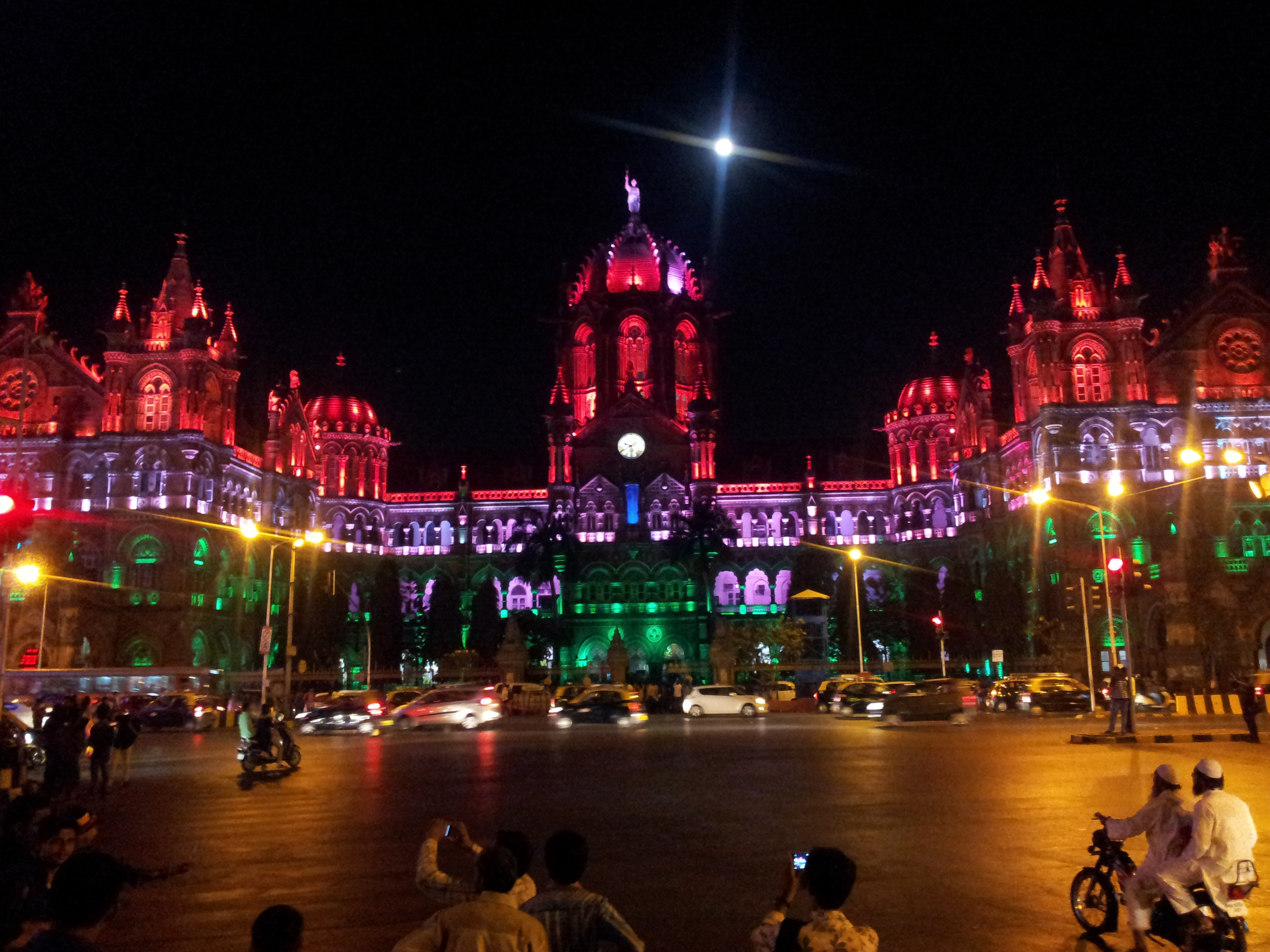
A special lighting for Republic Day

Since 2022, the heritage building of the station has been lit with LED lights in the evenings, which are often changed thematically, particularly for Indian national holidays such as Independence Day and Republic Day. And for civic events like Pride and Hindu festivals like Navratri, Ganesh Chaturthi, Dussehra, and Diwali

== Platforms ==
CSMT has a total of 18 platforms—seven platforms are for suburban EMU trains and eleven platforms (Platform 8 to Platform 18) are for long-distance trains.

Rajdhani, Duronto, Garib Rath and Tejas Express leave from Platform No. 18. Air-conditioned dormitories were inaugurated at CST on 16 April 2013. The facility has 58 beds for men and 20 for women.

== In popular culture ==
- The station was a filming location for the "Jai Ho" in Slumdog Millionaire, and the 2011 Bollywood Ra.One,; and is represented in the 2013 film The Attacks of 26/11, though permission to film at the station was denied due to sensitivity issues.

== See also ==
- Timeline of Mumbai
