= Bori Bunder railway station =

Defunct railway station in Maharashtra, India

Bori Bandar
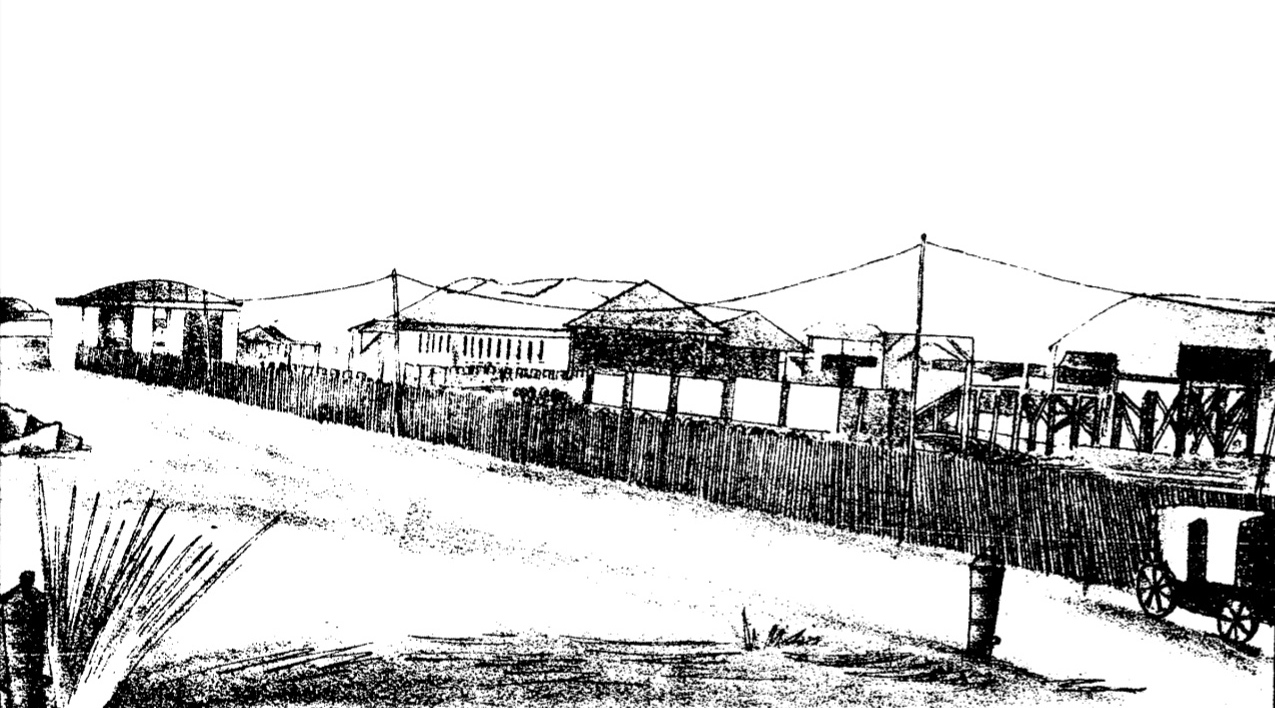
- Bori Bandar station

General information
- Location: Bombay, Maharashtra, India; India
- Coordinates: 18.9479601°N 72.8380995°E
- Owner: Great Indian Peninsular Railway

History
- Opened: 1853; 173 years ago
- Closed: Demolished in January 1882; 144 years ago
Location

Bori Bunder was a railway station, situated at Bori Bunder, Bombay, Bombay Presidency, in India. It was from here that first passenger train of the subcontinent ran to Thane in 1853. This station was rebuilt as Victoria Terminus later in 1888.

The GIP railway line opened formally in April 1853. The inauguration was done with the maiden run of the first train from Bori Bunder to Thane on the 16th of that month. A trial run of the journey in April was conducted on 18 November 1852, with the officials of the railway company.

== The station ==
Built by the then Great Indian Peninsula Railway, this railway station takes its name from the nearby locality, Bori Bunder.

The station was a small one, with only a single pair of tracks. It had wooden buildings, and those from the earliest days of the station had been regarded as "temporary" by the Chief Engineer Berkeley as late as 1860. The location of the station near the sea, meant that the waves often lashed near the Terminus. An Australian Newspaper Report however states that the function of the first train journey was held on a "neatly matted" platform, 300 feet (91 m) in length, hence suggesting that the said platform was a ground level platform, or a temporary structure of some kind.

With the American Civil War, Britain's demand for cotton was diverted from America to India. Bori Bunder station found itself as a 'dump yard' with cotton from over the country brought here, to be later transported to Britain through the seas. Newspaper sketches of the station show a large railway yard with bales of cotton lying on the ground. The cotton situation is aptly demonstrated by the following incident. On 28 March 1864, a series of fires broke out at the station, the first one starting between 10 and 11 am. It was reported that as many as 16 distinct fires broke out. The General Manager, Mr. Broughton, along with the District Traffic manager, as well as other heads of departments arrived soon, and the fires were successively extinguished with hose pipes and two of the town's fire engines. The blame fell upon an unknown man, and a boy who was found with matches, and admitted being induced by the former man, to set fire to the cotton. The railways offered a Rs.1000 reward to anyone reporting any information that would lead to the capture of the perpetrator.

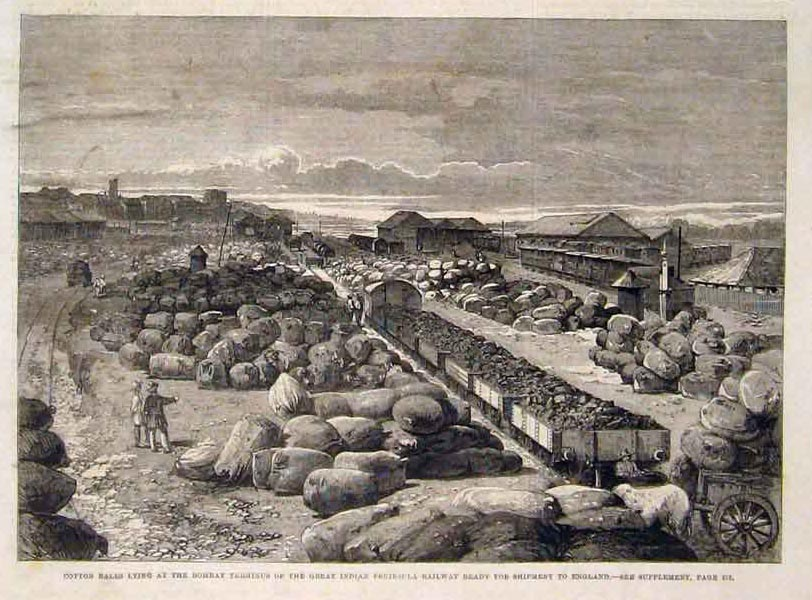
Cotton bales lying at Bori Bunder, ready for shipment to England, 1862

The station was 'overcrowded' with a lack of storage alternatives. Thereafter, large sheds and Godowns were constructed to protect the produce. A goods terminus was also later built at Wadi Bunder, to store firewood. The station had hence become considerable spacious by 1864. George Bradshaw had mentioned that the station was then a "commodious edifice" with well furnished reception rooms, and well planned for a "vast and extensive office".

The station was renovated several times till the 1870s, when finally after 1877, it was demolished to pave way for the majestic Victoria Terminus.

== Reconstruction ==
This station was rebuilt as Victoria Terminus later in 1888. The Grand station was built south of the original Bori Bunder station. The station was eventually renamed as the Chhatrapati Shivaji Maharaj Terminus (CSMT) after Maharashtra's famed 17th-century king, Chhatrapati Shivaji Maharaj.

== See also ==
- Bori Bunder
- Chhatrapati Shivaji Maharaj Terminus
- Thane railway station
