= 1893 Birthday Honours =

Appointments by Queen Victoria

The 1893 Birthday Honours were appointments by Queen Victoria to various orders and honours to reward and highlight good works by citizens of the British Empire. The appointments were made to celebrate the official birthday of The Queen, and were published in the London Gazette on 2 June 1893 and in The Times on 3 June 1893.

The recipients of honours are displayed here as they were styled before their new honour, and arranged by honour, with classes (Knight, Knight Grand Cross, etc.) and then divisions (Military, Civil, etc.) as appropriate.

== United Kingdom and British Empire ==
=== Baron ===
- Sir H. Hussey Vivian Bt MP
- Sir Thomas Henry Farrer Bt
- John Campbell White, of Overtoun, Dumbartonshire.
- Cecil G. Savile Foljambe.
- Francis Douglas, Viscount Drumlanrig.

=== Baronetcies ===
- Isaac Holden MP
- James Joicey MP
- Dr. Charles Cameron MP
- Benjamin Hingley MP
- William Ingram MP
- Joseph Pulley, formerly Member of Parliament for Herefordshire.
- William Henry Wills, formerly Member of Parliament for Coventry.
- Walter Gilbey.
- Sir Robert Hart GCMG Inspector-General of Customs in China.

=== Knight Bachelor ===
- William Roger Brown, of Trowbridge.
- William Davies, formerly Member of Parliament for Pembrokeshire.
- Henry Dias, late Puisne Judge of the Supreme Court of the Island of Ceylon.
- William Henderson, of Aberdeen.
- Samuel George Johnson, Town Clerk of Nottingham.
- John Leng MP for Dundee.
- George Henry Lewis.
- John Madden, Chief Justice of the Supreme Court of the Colony of Victoria.
- Patteson Nickalls.
- Dr. George Augustus Pilkington, formerly Mayor of Southport.
- Francis Powell, President of the Royal Scottish Society of Painters in Watercolour.
- Dr. William Overend Priestley.
- Hugh Gilzean-Reid, First President of the Institute of Journalists.
- Dr. Benjamin Ward Richardson FRS
- John Richard Robinson, Editor of the Daily News.
- Edward Richard Russell, Editor of the Liverpool Daily Post.
- George Shenton, President of the Legislative Council of the Colony of Western Australia.
- Samuel Henry Strong, Chief Justice of the Supreme Court of the Dominion of Canada.
- John Tenniel.
- Thomas Wright, of Leicester.

=== The Most Honourable Order of the Bath ===
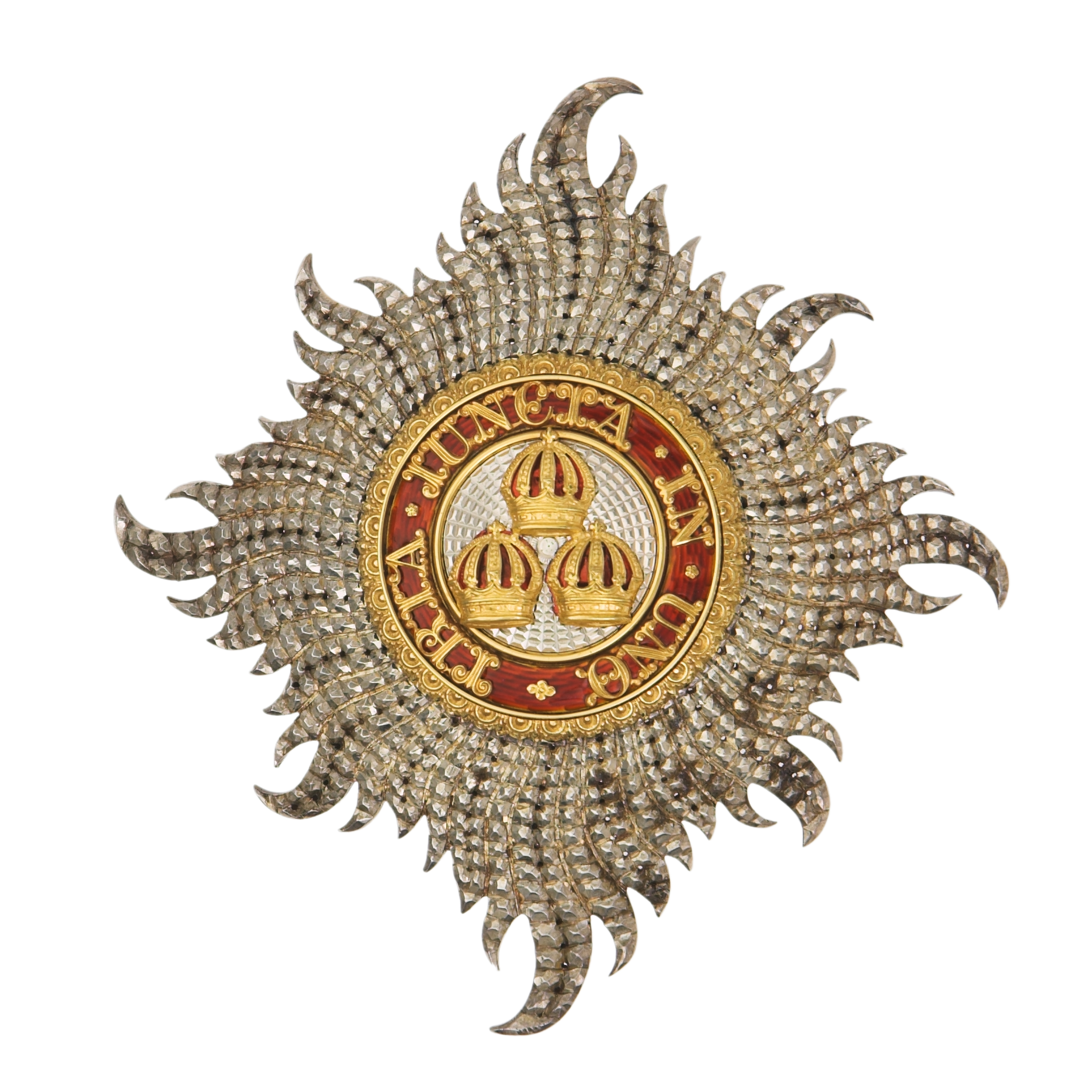
Civilian star of the Knight Grand Cross of the Order of the Bath

==== Knight Grand Cross of the Order of the Bath (GCB) ====
Military Division

- Lieutenant-General Sir James Hills-Johnes VC KCB Royal (late Bengal) Artillery.
- General Sir William Montagu Scott McMurdo KCB
- General Lord Mark Ralph George Kerr KCB

==== Knight Commander of the Order of the Bath (KCB) ====
Military Division

- General Richard Thomas Farren CB
- Major-General and Honorary Lieutenant-General William Drysdale CB
- Lieutenant-General and Honorary General Julius Augustus Robert Raines CB
- General William Gordon Cameron CB Commanding the Troops in South Africa.
- General the Hon. Percy Robert Basil Feilding CB
- General Alfred William Lucas CB Indian Staff Corps.
- Major-General and Honorary Lieutenant-General John Blick Spurgin CB CSI
- General Thomas Wright CB Indian Staff Corps.
- Lieutenant-General John Doran CB Indian Staff Corps.
- General Robert White CB
- General Mark Walker VC CB
- Lieutenant-General and Honorary General Charles John Foster CB
- Lieutenant-General William Stirling CB Royal Artillery, Governor and Commandant Royal Military Academy.

Civil Division

- Andrew Noble CB late Capt. Royal Artillery.
- Francis Mowatt CB Assistant Secretary to the Treasury.
- John Frecheville Dykes Donnelly CB Honorary Major-General Royal Engineers (Retired List), Secretary to the Science and Art Department.

==== Companion of the Order of the Bath (CB) ====
Military Division

- Major-General Augustus Henry King, Royal Artillery, Commanding Royal Artillery, Aldershot.
- Major-General Henry Broom Feilden.
- Major-General Archibald Hammond Utterson, Commanding a Brigade at Aldershot.
- Major General Crombie Cowie, Royal (late. Bengal) Artillery.
- Major-General George Francis Seville, Indian Staff Corps, Commanding a Second Class District in India.
- Colonel James May, Indian Army.
- Colonel William Liston Dalrymple, Deputy Quartermaster-General in India.
- Lieutenant-Colonel and Colonel Thomas Thomson Simpson.
- Colonel Arthur Haldimand Prinsep, Indian Army, Colonel on the Staff, Bengal.
- Colonel Charles John Burnett, Assistant Adjutant-General, Aldershot.
- Lieutenant-Colonel and Colonel Arthur Gore Handcock, Indian Staff Corps, Colonel on the Staff, Bengal.
- Lieutenant-Colonel and Colonel Dawsonne Melancthon Strong, Indian Army.
- Colonel (with the local rank of Brigadier-General) Alexander Angus Airlie Kinloch, Commanding a Second Class District in India.
- Lieutenant-Colonel and Colonel Malcolm Hassels Nicolson, Indian Army, Aide-de-Camp to the Queen.
- Lieutenant-Colonel and Colonel Osmond Barnes, Indian Staff Corps.
- Colonel Thomas Kelly-Kenny.
- Colonel Frederick Augustus le Mesurier, Colonel on the Staff (Chief Engineer), Ireland.
- Colonel (with the local rank of Brigadier-General) Gerald de Courcy Morton, Commanding a Second Class District in India.
- Lieutenant-Colonel and Colonel Theophilus Higginson, Indian Staff Corps.
- Lieutenant-Colonel and Colonel George Swinley, Royal (late Bengal) Artillery, Colonel on the Staff, Bengal.
- Colonel William Salmond, Deputy Inspector-General of Fortifications at Headquarters.
- Lieutenant-Colonel and Colonel Henry Hallam Parr CMG The Prince Albert's (Somersetshire Light Infantry), Aide-de-Camp to the Queen.
- Lieutenant-Colonel and Brevet Colonel Mark Sever Bell VC Royal Engineers, Aide-de-Camp to the Queen.
- Lieutenant-Colonel and Colonel James Henry Gordon DSO Indian Staff Corps.
- Lieutenant-Colonel and Brevet Colonel Robert MacGregor Stewart, Aide-de-Camp to the Queen, Chief Instructor School of Gunnery.
- Lieutenant-Colonel and Colonel Reginald William Dalgety, the York and Lancaster Regiment.
- Colonel James Tierney Skinner DSO Army Service Corps, Assistant Adjutant-General (for Supply Reserves) Woolwich Dockyard.
- Colonel Charles James Bromhead, Regimental District.
- Lieutenant-Colonel and Colonel John Baillie Ballantyne Dickson.
- Major and Colonel Frederick George Slade, Royal Artillery.
- Lieutenant-Colonel and Brevet Colonel John Palmer Brabazon, 4th Hussars, Aide-de-Camp to the Queen.
- Lieutenant-Colonel and Brevet Colonel Reginald Garnett, Aide-de-Camp to the Queen.
- Lieutenant-Colonel Harrison Ross Lewin Morgan, Royal Artillery.

Civil Division

- Richard Mills, Assistant Comptroller and Auditor-General, Exchequer and Audit Department.
- Owen Slacke, late Capt. 10th Hussars, Divisional Commissioner in Ireland (Northern Division).
- Edward Maunde Thompson, Principal Librarian and Secretary of the British Museum.
- Charles George Turner, Accountant and Comptroller-General of the Inland Revenue Department.

=== The Imperial Order of the Crown of India ===
- Her Highness Kempa Nanjammani Vani Vilasa Sannidhana, the Maharani of Mysore.

=== The Most Exalted Order of the Star of India ===
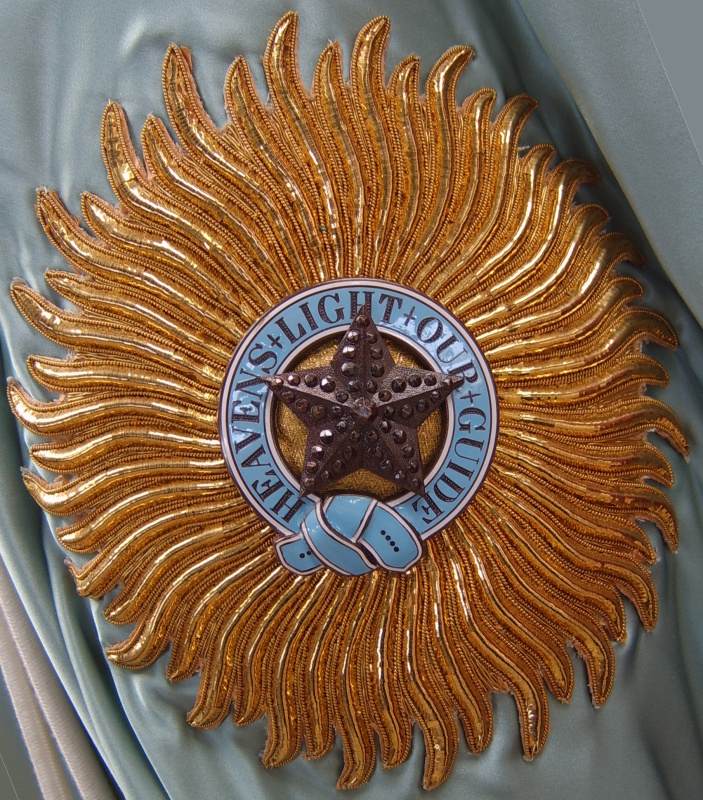
Star of a Knight Grand Commander of the Most Exalted Order of the Star of India.

==== Knight Grand Commander (GCSI) ====
- General Frederick Sleigh, Baron Roberts of Kandahar GCB GCIE VC

==== Companion (CSI) ====
- Herbert Mills Birdwood, Ordinary Member of the Council of the Governor of Bombay.
- Charles James Lyall CIE Secretary to the Government of India in the Home Department.
- Herbert Frederick Clogstoun, Commissioner of Revenue Settlement and Director of Land Records and Agriculture, Madras.
- Major General Alexander Walker RA Director-General of Ordnance in India.
- Colonel Hurlock Galloway Pritchard, Indian Staff Corps, Accountant General in the Military Department Government of India.
- Lieutenant-Colonel Howard Melliss, Indian Staff Corps.

=== The Most Distinguished Order of Saint Michael and Saint George ===
Star of the Order of Saint Michael and Saint George.

==== Knight Grand Cross of the Order of St Michael and St George (GCMG) ====
- Sir George William Des Vœux KCMG late Governor of Hong Kong.

==== Knight Commander of the Order of St Michael and St George (KCMG) ====
- John Carling, Senator and Member of the Government of the Dominion of Canada.
- Charles Todd CMG Postmaster-General and Superintendent of Telegraphs of the Colony of South Australia.
- Melmoth Osborn CMG late Commissioner and Chief Magistrate, Zululand.
- Gilbert Thomas Carter CMG Governor of the Colony of Lagos.
- George Berkley Past President of the Institution of Civil Engineers, for services rendered as Consulting Engineer to the Government of Natal and in connection with other Colonies.
- Francis Henry Evans MP for services in connection with the Colonies as Deputy Chairman of the Union Steamship Company, and otherwise.

==== Companion of the Order of St Michael and St George (CMG) ====
- Major-General Alexander Bruce Tulloch CB Commandant of the Military Forces of the Colony of Victoria.
- James Robert Gowan Member of the Senate of the Dominion of Canada, and formerly Judge of the High Court of Justice, Ontario.
- Collingwood Schreiber, Deputy Minister of Railways and Canals in the Dominion of Canada.
- Major William George Morris, Royal Engineers, for services connected with the Geodetic Survey of the Colonies of the Cape of Good Hope and Natal.
- Edward Charles Stirling Senior Surgeon to the Adelaide Hospital and Member of the Council of the University of Adelaide, in the Colony of South Australia.
- Philip Burnard Chenery Ayres, Colonial Surgeon and Inspector of Hospitals in the Colony of Hong Kong.
- Francis Henry Lovell, Chief Medical Officer and President of the General Board of Health, Mauritius.
- Daniel Morris Assistant Director of the Royal Botanic Gardens, Kew, in recognition of scientific and economic services rendered to Her Majesty's Colonies.
- Walter Peace, for many years Emigration Agent in London for the Colony of Natal.
- Samuel Lewis, Barrister-at-Law, Unofficial Member of the Legislative Council of Sierra Leone.
- Denis O'Donovan, Librarian of the Parliament of the Colony of Queensland.
- Francis John Waring, C.E. Chief Resident Engineer of the Government Railway Extensions in Ceylon.
- Francis John Stephens Hopwood, Assistant Secretary, Railway Department, Board of Trade, for services in connection with Colonial Fisheries and other Maritime questions.

=== The Most Eminent Order of the Indian Empire ===
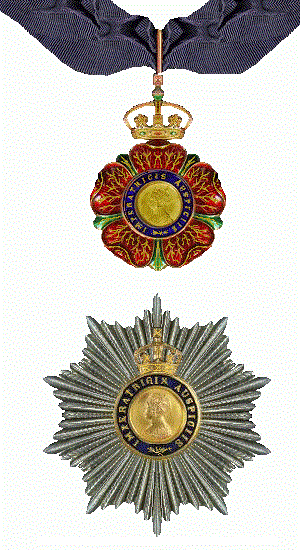
Riband, badge and star of the Knight Grand Commander of the Order of the Indian Empire

==== Knight Commander (KCIE) ====
- Lieutenant-General Thomas Edward Gordon CB CSI Indian Staff Corps.
- Lieutenant-General Edward Charles Sparshott Williams CIE Royal Engineers
- Sardar Asad Khan, of Sarayvan CIE
- John Lambert CIE Commissioner of Police, Calcutta.

==== Companion (CIE) ====
- Lieutenant-Colonel Henry Ravenshaw Thuillier, Royal Engineers, Surveyor-General of India.
- Surgeon-Colonel Archibald Hamilton Hilson late Inspector-General of Civil Hospitals in Bengal.
- Capt. Alexander Campbell DSO Deputy Director, Royal Indian Marines.
- Rao Bahadur Singh, Thakur of Masuda.
- Sheikh Baha-ud-din, Nawab-i-Umb, Vizier of the Nawab of Junagarh.
- Veterinary Lieutenant-Colonel James Herbert Brockencote Hallen FRCS Inspector-General of the Civil Veterinary Department in India.
- Surgeon-Lieutenant-Colonel David Douglas Cunningham Professor of Physiology, Medical College, Calcutta.
- Alexander Milne, Lieutenant-Colonel Commanding Surma Valley Light Horse Volunteers.
- Bertram Sausmarez Carey, Political Officer, Chin Hills.
- Dewan Bahadur Srinivasa Raghava Iyengar Inspector-General of Registration, Madras.
