= Camberwell Cemeteries =

Cemetery in London, England

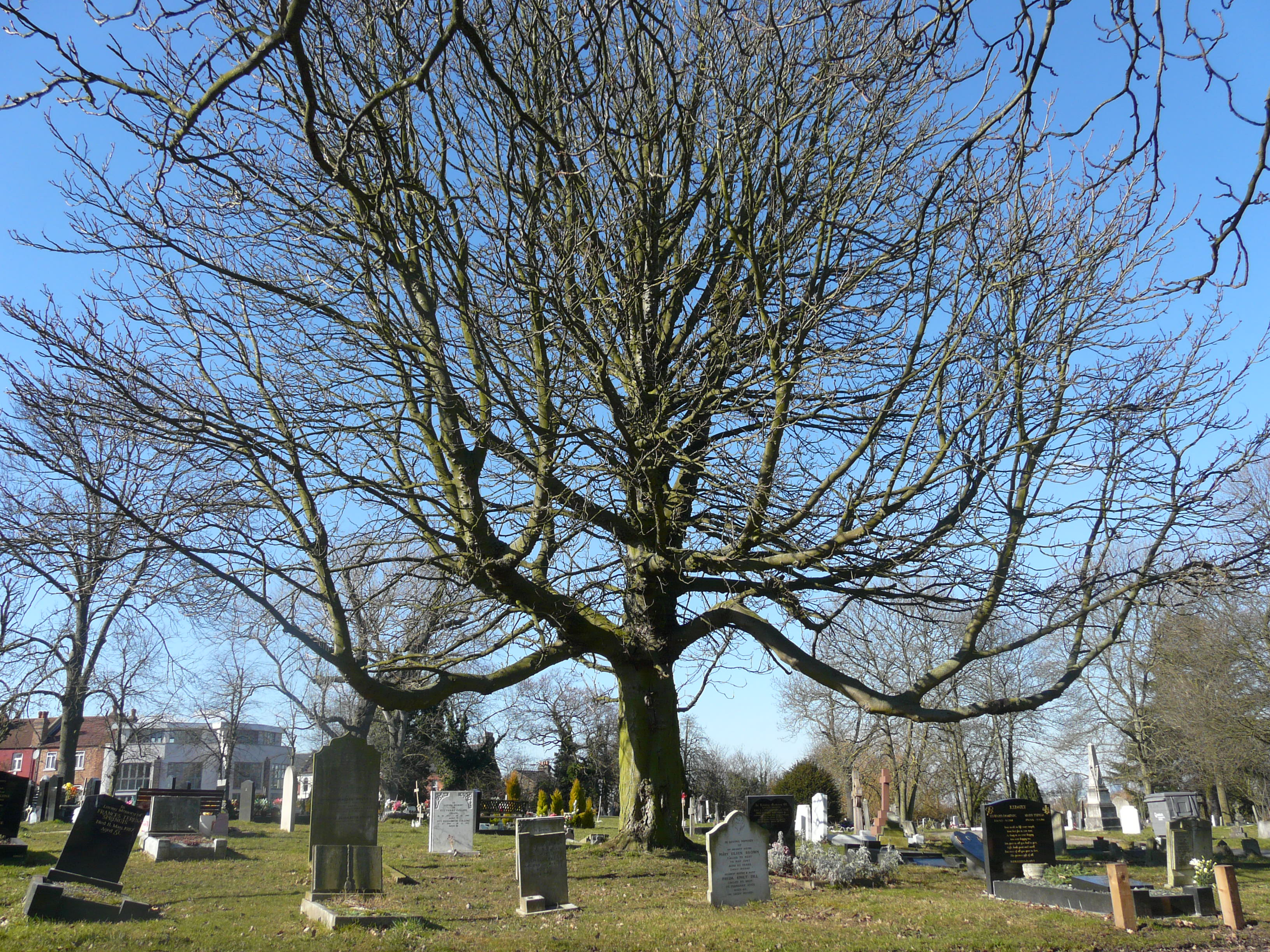
- Camberwell Old Cemetery
- Interactive map of Camberwell Cemeteries

Details
- Established: 1855
- Location: Honor Oak, South London, SE22 0SQ (Old Cemetery) & SE23 3RD (New Cemetery); Old Cemetery; New Cemetery
- Country: England
- Type: Public
- Owned by: Southwark London Borough Council
- Size: 12 hectares (30 acres) Old Cemetery; 27.6 hectares (68 acres) New Cemetery
- Website: Old Cemetery; New Cemetery
- Find a Grave: 2180349 Old Cemetery; 2249609 New Cemetery

The two Camberwell cemeteries located close to each other in Honor Oak, south London, England, are notable for their burials and architecture. They have been an important source of socioeconomic data documenting the historical growth and changing demography in the community for the Southwark area since 1855.

== Camberwell Old Cemetery ==
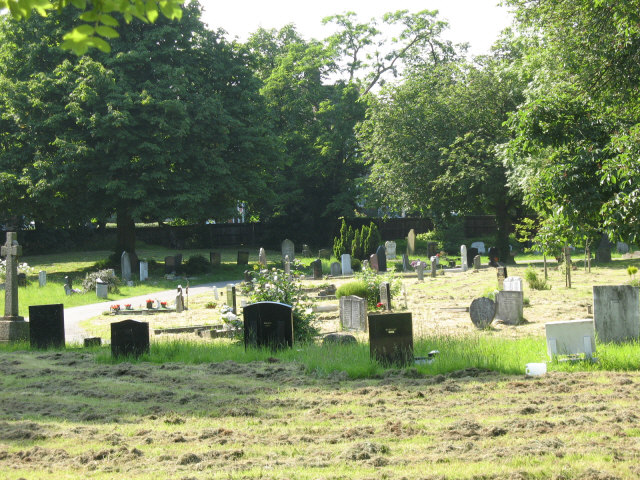
Graves in the Western end of Camberwell Old Cemetery

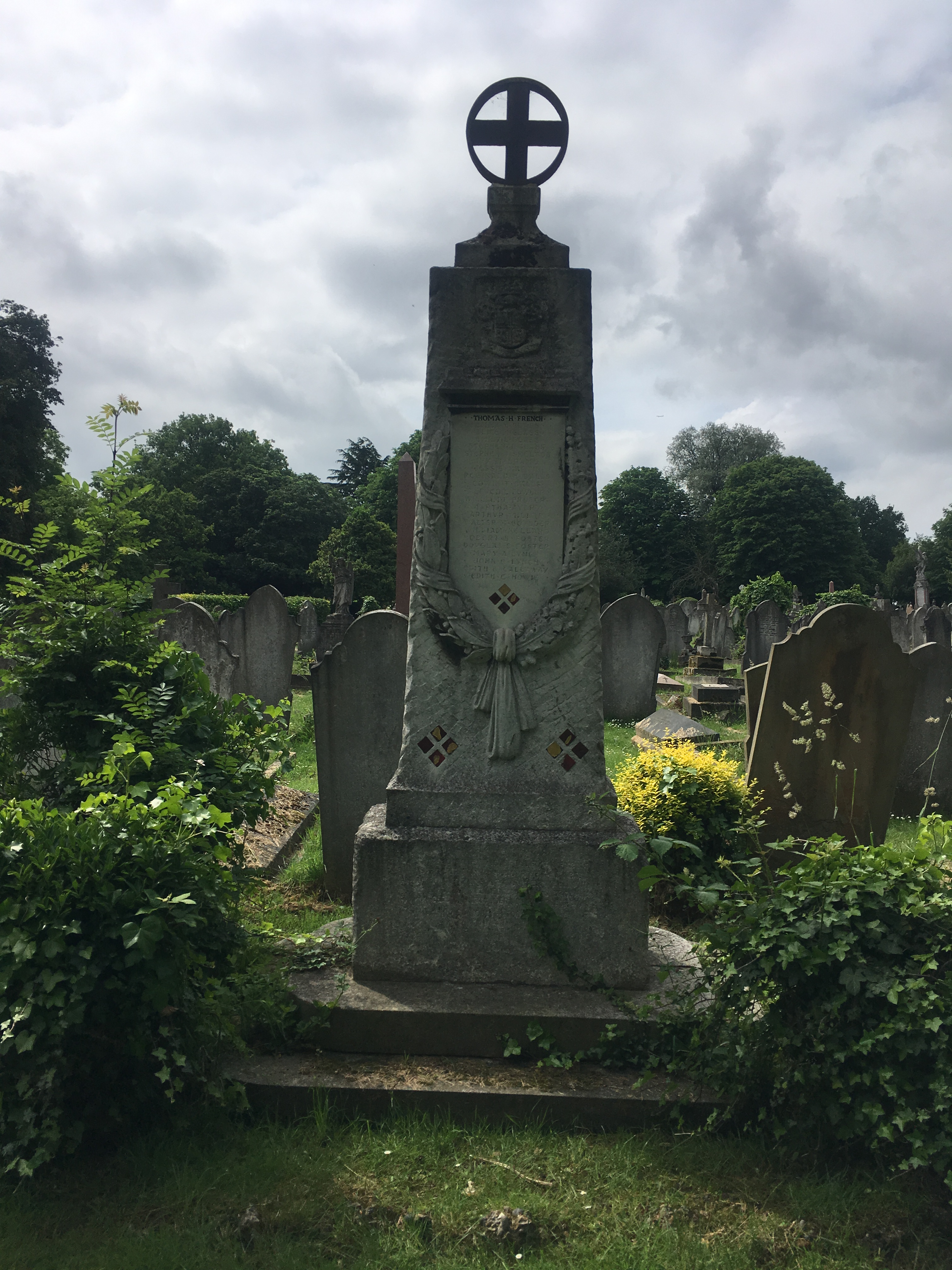
Memorial in Camberwell Old Cemetery, to 21 civilians killed by Zeppelin bombings in 1917

The old cemetery, located on Forest Hill Road, covers approximately 12 hectares (30 acres). It is part of the second wave of mid 19th century cemeteries that were established in London to solve the problem of overcrowding in church yards. The first wave of cemeteries are commonly known as the Magnificent Seven.

The site was purchased in 1855 by the Camberwell Cemetery Board (formed 1850) from the trustees of Sir Walter St John's Charity at Battersea for £9,927. It was originally meadow land, which was then designated as a Burial Ground of St Giles, Camberwell.

The first interment took place on 3 July 1856; over 30,000 burials took place in the subsequent 30 years. In 1874 the cemetery was expanded by a further seven acres with the inclusion of land bought from the British Land Company for £4,550. By 1984, 300,000 interments had been carried out at the cemetery.

The Gothic Revival lodge and two chapels (one Church of England and one Non-Conformist) were designed by Sir George Gilbert Scott's architectural firm. When burials were transferred to the New Cemetery the chapel fell into disrepair and both were demolished in the 1960s. A third (Roman Catholic) chapel was demolished in the 1970s. Later the architectural importance of the lodge was recognised and when it was destroyed by fire in the 1970s it was restored rather than being torn down. The lodge was used in the 1970 film adaptation of Joe Orton's play Entertaining Mr Sloane, as well as scenes filmed in the cemetery among the graves.

There are 288 Commonwealth service war graves from the First World War, 160 of whom are in a war graves plot in cemetery's north-east corner where there are two Screen Wall memorials, one listing those buried in the plot and the other those buried elsewhere in the cemetery whose graves could not be marked by headstones. There is also a group of special memorials to 14 casualties buried in the Second World War.

There is also an unusual First World War memorial dedicated to 21 civilians who were killed in a Zeppelin raid on Camberwell in 1917.

On 1 July and 21 July 1944 V1 flying bombs landed in the cemetery. The blasts caused damage to surrounding properties, but no casualties.

On 3 November 2011 Azezur Khan (a.k.a. Ronnie), was shot dead following a funeral in the cemetery. Police believe that Mr Khan was an innocent bystander.

=== Notable graves in the Old Cemetery ===
- James John Berkeley, chief engineer of the Great Indian Peninsular Railway
- John Donovan, Albert Medal for Lifesaving recipient. He was the Chief Boatman in charge of the Old Head HM Coastguard Station, Kinsale. He and his crew dragged their galley a mile and half overland and lowered it down a cliff face to go to the aid of the Italian barque Thetis, a ship of 324 tons, with a crew of eleven persons, when they were being driven ashore in Courtmacsherry Bay during a gale on November 30, 1866
- Frederick John Horniman, founder of the Horniman Museum, died 1906
- Able Seaman Albert Edward McKenzie VC in Zeebrugge Raid, died November 1918
- Harry Quelch (1858-1913), journalist, early British Marxist and trade unionist.
- George Rodney, 7th Baron Rodney, army officer, racehorse owner and peer, died 1909.
- Elizabeth Mary Anne Eagle Skinner (1875–1929), founder of the Mystical Church of the Comforter
- William Stanlake VC in Battle of Inkerman, died 1904
- Charles Waters founder of the International Bible Reading Association.
- Jack Whicher, noted detective and founder member of the Detective Branch of the Metropolitan Police, died 1881.

== Camberwell New Cemetery ==
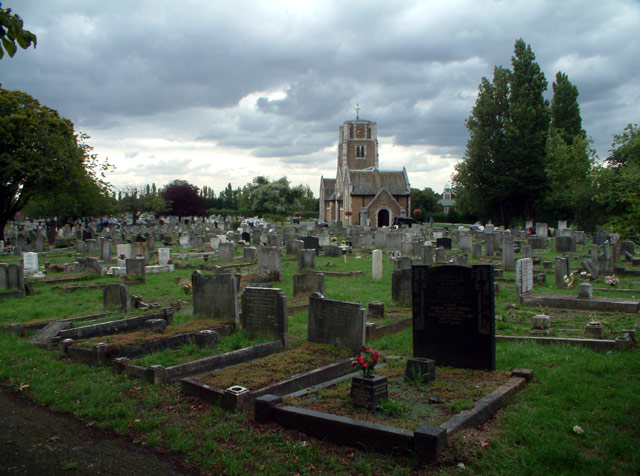
View of Camberwell New Cemetery with mortuary chapel

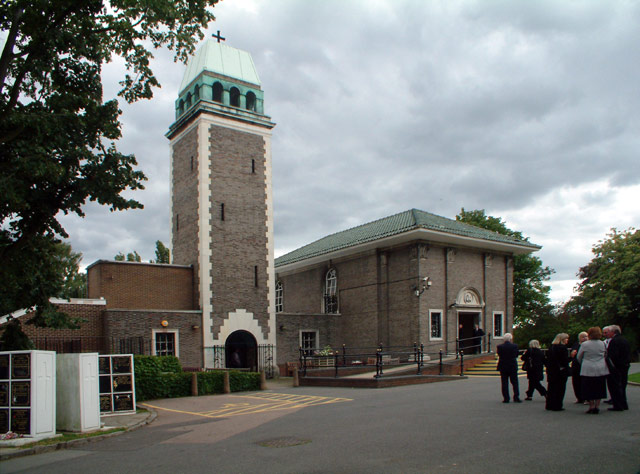
Honor Oak Crematorium

The cemetery is located on Brenchley Gardens about half a mile from the old cemetery. In the early 20th Century it was recognised that the original cemetery would be at capacity in the near future. The land for the new cemetery was purchased in three lots in 1901:

1. The central portion of 9.7 hectares (24 acres) was bought from Alfred Stevens, farmer and landowner of Peckham Rye for £11,305
2. The western portion, 13 hectares (32 acres), next to One Tree Hill was bought later in 1901 also from Alfred Stevens for £19,469
3. A final 4.9 hectares (12 acres), adjoining the Brockley footpath were bought from the Governors of Christ's Hospital for £6,325

Following its acquisition much of the 27.6 hectares (68 acres) of land was rented out for other uses, including a golf club and a fireworks factory run by Joseph Wells. Although much of the land was later used for interments there are large portions that remain unused for burials. Some of this land is now a recreation ground and there now is strong local opposition to this land being used for its original purpose of burials.

In 1926 the first part of the land was laid out as a cemetery and was consecrated by the Right Reverend William Woodcock Hough, Bishop of Woolwich. The first interment took place on 23 May 1927. A smaller section was set aside for use of Free Churches.

The lodge, waiting room and mortuary chapels were designed by Sir Aston Webb and his son, Maurice. Maurice Webb was the architect for the Honor Oak crematorium, built in 1939 to meet a growing demand for cremations. It is situated in the cemetery grounds, ten acres of which were landscaped as memorial gardens. The crematorium is also a listed building and is notable for its beautiful stained glass window. By 1984 over 91,000 cremations had been conducted.

In addition to one grave from the First World War, there are 198 Commonwealth service war graves of the Second, some 80 of the latter in war graves plot in Squares 91 and 92. A Screen Wall memorial lists some 120 whose graves could not be marked by headstones, and 56 other service personnel who were cremated at Honor Oak Crematorium.

The cemetery has recently been used as a filming location for London Boulevard and Hereafter

=== Notable graves in the New Cemetery ===
- George Cornell East end gangster famously shot by the Kray twins in 1966 at The Blind Beggar public house
- General Frederick Coutts (1899–1986), Salvation Army general
- General Wilfred Kitching (1893–1977), Salvation Army general
- Freddie Mills world light heavyweight boxing champion from 1948 to 1950
- William Pullum world weight-lifting champion
- Anne Shelton (1923–1994) popular singer, the 'Forces' Favourite' in WWII
- John Trunley (1898–1944) a local celebrity who appeared on stage with Fred Karno in the early 20th century as a "fat boy" (he weighed 33 stone at age 18)
