= Albert Edward McKenzie =

Recipient of the Victoria Cross

Albert McKenzie VC
- Albert McKenzie returns home with his VC
- Born: 23 October 1898; Bermondsey, London
- Died: 3 November 1918 (aged 20); Chatham Naval Hospital, Kent
- Burial place: Camberwell Old Cemetery
- Military career
- Allegiance: United Kingdom
- Branch: Royal Navy
- Service years: 1913–1918
- Rank: Able Seaman
- Units: HMS Vindictive
- Conflicts: World War I †
- Awards: Victoria Cross

Albert Edward McKenzie VC (23 October 1898 – 3 November 1918) was an English recipient of the Victoria Cross, the highest and most prestigious award for gallantry in the face of the enemy that can be awarded to British and Commonwealth forces.

== Details ==
McKenzie was a 19-year-old able seaman in the Royal Navy during the First World War who was taking part in the Zeebrugge Raid when he performed the deed for which he was awarded the VC.

On 22/23 April 1918 at Zeebrugge, Belgium, Able Seaman McKenzie was a member of a storming party on the night of the operation. He landed with his machine-gun in the face of great difficulties, advancing down the Mole with his commanding officer (Arthur Leyland Harrison) who with most of his party was killed. The seaman accounted for several of the enemy running for shelter to a destroyer alongside the Mole, and was severely wounded whilst working his gun in an exposed position.

He was presented with his VC by King George V at Buckingham Palace. However, having almost recovered from his wounds, he died of influenza during the world flu pandemic at the beginning of November 1918. He is buried in Camberwell Old Cemetery, South London.

== The medal ==
Mckenzie's Victoria Cross is still owned by the McKenzie family and is on loan to the Imperial War Museum in London.

== Commemoration ==
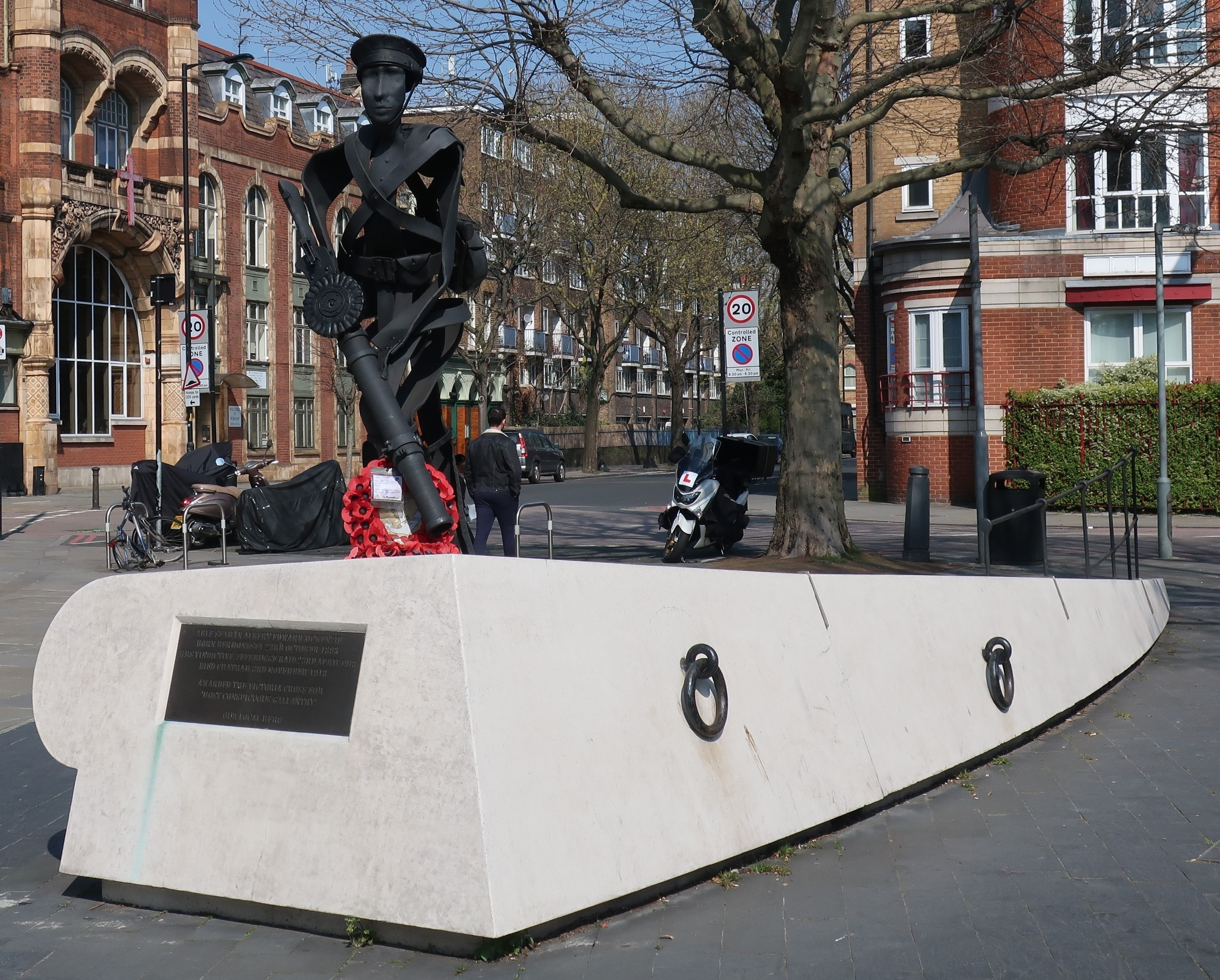
Memorial to Albert McKenzie in Bermondsey

A memorial in honour of Albert McKenzie VC was unveiled on 23 October 2015 (the 117th anniversary of his birth) at the junction of Tower Bridge Road, Decima Street and Bermondsey Street, Bermondsey, in the London Borough of Southwark.
