= William Pullum =

English physical culturist and strongman (1887–1960)

William Albert Pullum
- Born: Horatio William Albert Pullum; 8 April 1887; Camberwell, London, England
- Died: 29 August 1960 (aged 73)
- Occupations: Physical culturist, strongman

William Albert Pullum (8 April 1887 – 29 August 1960) was an English physical culturist, strongman and weightlifter. His interest in weight conditioning stemmed from a childhood illness. However, he matured into an icon in the physical culture world.

== Early life ==
Pullum was born on 8 April 1887 Camberwell. In 1904, at age 12, he suffered from pulmonary tuberculosis and was treated and operated on unsuccessfully at two London hospitals. He then turned to exercise for help. Years later, he claimed, "I cured myself of the disease through physical culture methods." At age 17, Pullum saw a stage production by the unparalleled Saxon Trio at the Camberwell Palace of Varieties, and this initiated his desire to become more fit and powerful through a lifetime commitment to weight-training.

At the conclusion of the Saxon Trio display, a strength competition was held for local strongmen. The winner of this event, William (Bill) Slade, was destined to play a far-reaching role in young W. A. Pullum's health and future.

Pullum in need of local lodging after his parents moved to London, and he wanted to complete his apprenticeship with a local picture frame manufacturer. He found lodgings with the neighboring Slade family, of six brothers, three of whom made a livelihood by competing in strongman competitions.

== Exercises ==
When the oldest, Bill Slade, noticed the poor physical development of Pullum, he opted to design a course of exercises consisting of deep breathing, strand-pulling, and vigorous exercise with light dumbbells. Following one year of Slade's supervision, with the exercise regimen made progressively more demanding, Pullum was declared cured of tuberculosis by his family doctor.

The Slade brothers' association with the Saxon Trio and other traditional strongmen who frequented the stages of London's music halls, enabled Pullum to observe their strength feats from theatre wings and talk to them in their dressing rooms. In 1905, at a height of five-feet, five-inches and weighing 125 pounds, Pullum appeared with the "Anglo Saxons," a trio specializing in acrobatic feats and classical weightlifting stunts. In 1906, he set his first unofficial world record of 204 pounds in the two-hand-anyhow lift.

== Weightlifting club ==
By 1907, Pullum's center of activities became his four-story dwelling in Southeast London, which served as his home, his office, and the Camberwell Weightlifting Club. Here, Pullum entertained and instructed millionaires, champion boxers, weightlifters, and wrestlers while working as a practitioner in remedial physical culture. He believed in instructing his "more promising" students on an individual basis to produce world-class weightlifters and bodybuilders. Years later, one of his famous gym members included J. Paul Getty who was the world's richest man at one time.

== Accomplishments ==
Between 1911 and 1915, Pullum won 192 British and world weightlifting records, won 15 British Championships, and was awarded 53 gold medals.

Acting as an Olympic coach and technical adviser to the British Amateur Weight Lifters' Association, he and his pupils held 222 out of a possible 252 records.

At the onset of World War I, Pullum was appointed by the British military authorities to take charge of the conditioning of physically rejected recruits. His conditioning program produced a 95 percent success rate, This led to other fitness training assignments doled out by the British government.

Following World War I, Pullum played London's music halls, duplicating a number of feats made famous by the Saxon Trio. His "Challenge Dumbbell" with its large diameter grip and weighed 185 pounds, was bent-pressed by his right arm, before cleaning-and pressing a 62-pound kettlebell with his left arm. This equated close to a double-bodyweight lift.

At age 42, retiring undefeated in strength competition, Pullum's two books; "Weight-Lifting Made Easy and Interesting," and "How to Use a Barbell," became standard textbooks.

== Return to training ==
Following a ten year layoff from weight-training, at age 52, Pullum went into strict training and astonished his peers with feats of strength, highlighted by duplicating his original world record of 204 pounds in the two-hand-anyhow lift, which he set in 1906.

In 1942, at the height of the bombing of London, Pullum saved a heavy-set woman from death by dislodging her from a ventilating shaft in a bomb shelter where 17 individuals had lost their lives. In the process he sustained serious internal injuries, causing him to undergo two major surgeries. His final stage appearance took place in 1947.

Pullum purchased Health & Strength magazine in 1956. Associates later suggested the pressure of working day and night was a factor in his decline in health.

== Death ==
William Albert Pullum died in 1960, at age 73 and is buried in Camberwell New Cemetery.
