= William Stanlake =

Recipient of the Victoria Cross

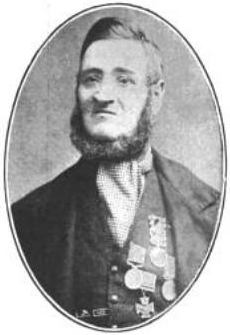
- In The Sketch, 14 October 1896
- Born: 31 October 1830; Uppacott Farm, Halwill, Devon
- Died: 24 April 1904 (aged 73); Camberwell, London
- Burial place: Camberwell Old Cemetery
- Military career
- Allegiance: United Kingdom
- Branch: British Army
- Units: Coldstream Guards
- Conflicts: Crimean War
- Awards: Victoria Cross; Distinguished Conduct Medal

William Stanlake (sometimes spelled Stanlack) VC DCM (31 October 1830 – 24 April 1904) was an English recipient of the Victoria Cross, the highest and most prestigious award for gallantry in the face of the enemy that can be awarded to British and Commonwealth forces.

He was 23 years old, and he was a private in the Coldstream Guards of the British Army during the Crimean War when the following deed took place for which he was awarded the VC.

On 26 October 1854 near Inkerman, Crimea, Private Stanlake, when employed as a sharpshooter, volunteered to reconnoitre, and although he was warned of the dangers he would encounter, crawled to within six yards of a Russian sentry and brought back such information that the officer in charge of the party was able to make a surprise attack.

He is buried in Camberwell Old Cemetery in South East London. His Victoria Cross is displayed at The Guards Regimental Headquarters (Coldstream Guards RHQ), Wellington Barracks, London, England.
