= George Berkley (engineer) =

British civil engineer

Sir George Berkley
- Born: 26 April 1821; Holloway, Middlesex, England
- Died: 20 December 1893 (aged 72); Kensington, London
- Spouse: Matilda Garford (m. 1843)
- Engineering career
- Discipline: Civil
- Institutions: Institution of Civil Engineers (president)
- Significant design: Colesberg Bridge

Sir George Berkley KCMG (26 April 1821 – 20 December 1893) was an English civil engineer from London. He designed the Colesberg Bridge, a 390 m Warren truss bridge built in 1885 over the Orange River in Colesberg, South Africa.

Berkley was a consulting engineer for the Indian Midland Railway and, with Sir Charles Fox, built the 19–mile long Indian Tramway, a light railway running from Arconum to Conjeverum. He served as president of the Institution of Civil Engineers from May 1891 to May 1892.

Berkley was made a Knight Commander of the Order of St. Michael and St. George in Queen Victoria's 1893 Birthday Honours. His daughter, Rose, married Sir John St. George, 5th Baronet in 1894. He died on 20 December 1893.

He was a younger brother of James John Berkley (1819–1862), chief engineer of the Great Indian Peninsula Railway.

Professional and academic associations
Preceded by John Coode	President of the Institution of Civil Engineers; May 1891 – May 1892	Succeeded by Harrison Hayter
