= Charles Fox (engineer, born 1810) =

British civil engineer (1810–1874)

Sir Charles Fox
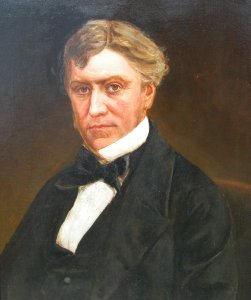
- Born: 11 March 1810; Derby, United Kingdom
- Died: 11 June 1874 (aged 64); Blackheath, London
- Spouse(s): Mary, Lady Fox (née Brookhouse)
- Children: Charles Heyland Fox; Sir Francis Fox; Sir Charles Douglas Fox
- Parent: Dr Francis Fox
- Engineering career
- Discipline: Civil engineer Structural engineer
- Institutions: Institution of Civil Engineers, Institution of Mechanical Engineers, Fellow of the Royal Asiatic Society and Royal Geographical Society
- Projects: The Crystal Palace

Sir Charles Fox (11 March 1810 – 11 June 1874) was an English civil engineer and contractor. His work focused on railways, railway stations and bridges.

== Biography ==
Born in Derby in 1810, Charles Fox was the youngest of five sons of Dr. Francis Fox. Initially trained to follow his father's career, he abandoned medical training at age 19 and became articled to John Ericsson, working with him and John Braithwaite on the Novelty locomotive, which he drove in the Rainhill trials on the Liverpool and Manchester Railway. He acquired a taste for locomotive driving and was employed on the Liverpool and Manchester Railway, being present at its opening.

In 1830, Fox married Mary, second daughter of Joseph Brookhouse, by whom he had three sons and a daughter. Two of his sons, Francis Fox and Charles Douglas Fox, also became engineers.

== Railways ==
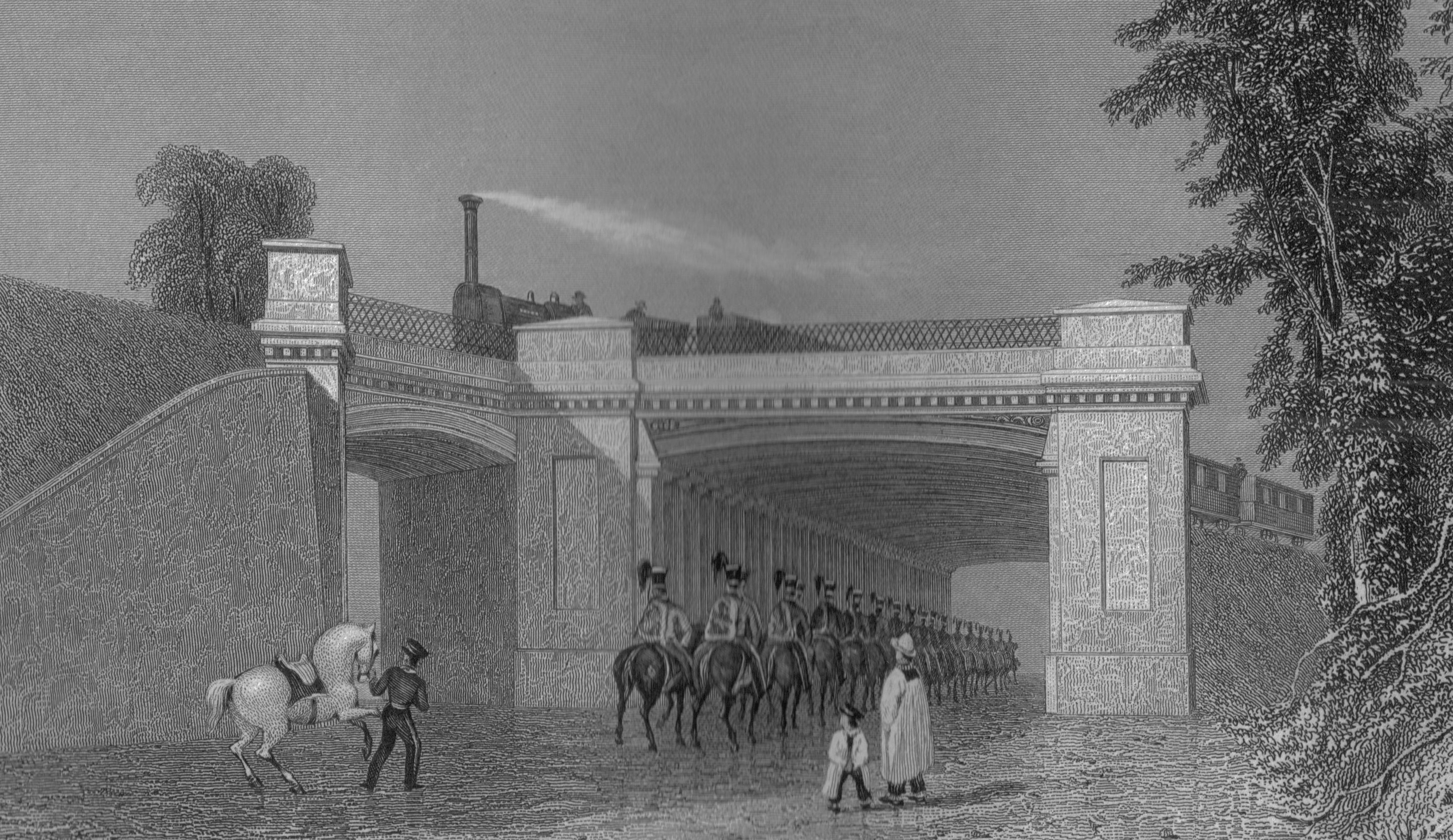
A contemporary engraving of Denbigh Hall skew Bridge on the London and Birmingham Railway

One of his earliest inventions, patented in 1838, was railway points, which superseded the sliding rail used up to that time.

In 1837 Robert Stephenson appointed him as one of the engineers on the London and Birmingham Railway, where he was responsible for Watford tunnel and the incline down from Camden Town to Euston. He presented an important paper on the correct principles of skew arches to the Royal Institution. In 1837 the future philosopher of evolution Herbert Spencer, whose father George Spencer had been Fox's tutor when young, joined him as an assistant engineer.

Fox then entered into partnership with the contractor Francis Braham to form the company Braham, Fox and Co., which when Braham retired became Fox, Henderson and Co., of London, Smethwick, and Renfrew. The company specialised in railway equipment, including wheels, bridges, roofs, cranes, tanks and permanent way materials. It also experimented with components for suspension and girder bridges, with Fox reading a paper before the Royal Society in 1865. The company was responsible for many important station roofs including Liverpool Tithebarn Street, (1849–50), Bradford Exchange (1850), Paddington and Birmingham New Street.

One notable employee of Fox, Henderson & Co. was William Siemens, a pioneering mechanical and electrical engineer. His designs for an energy-saving boiler led to financial losses for the company, but his electrical telegraph recovered the losses.

== Crystal Palace ==
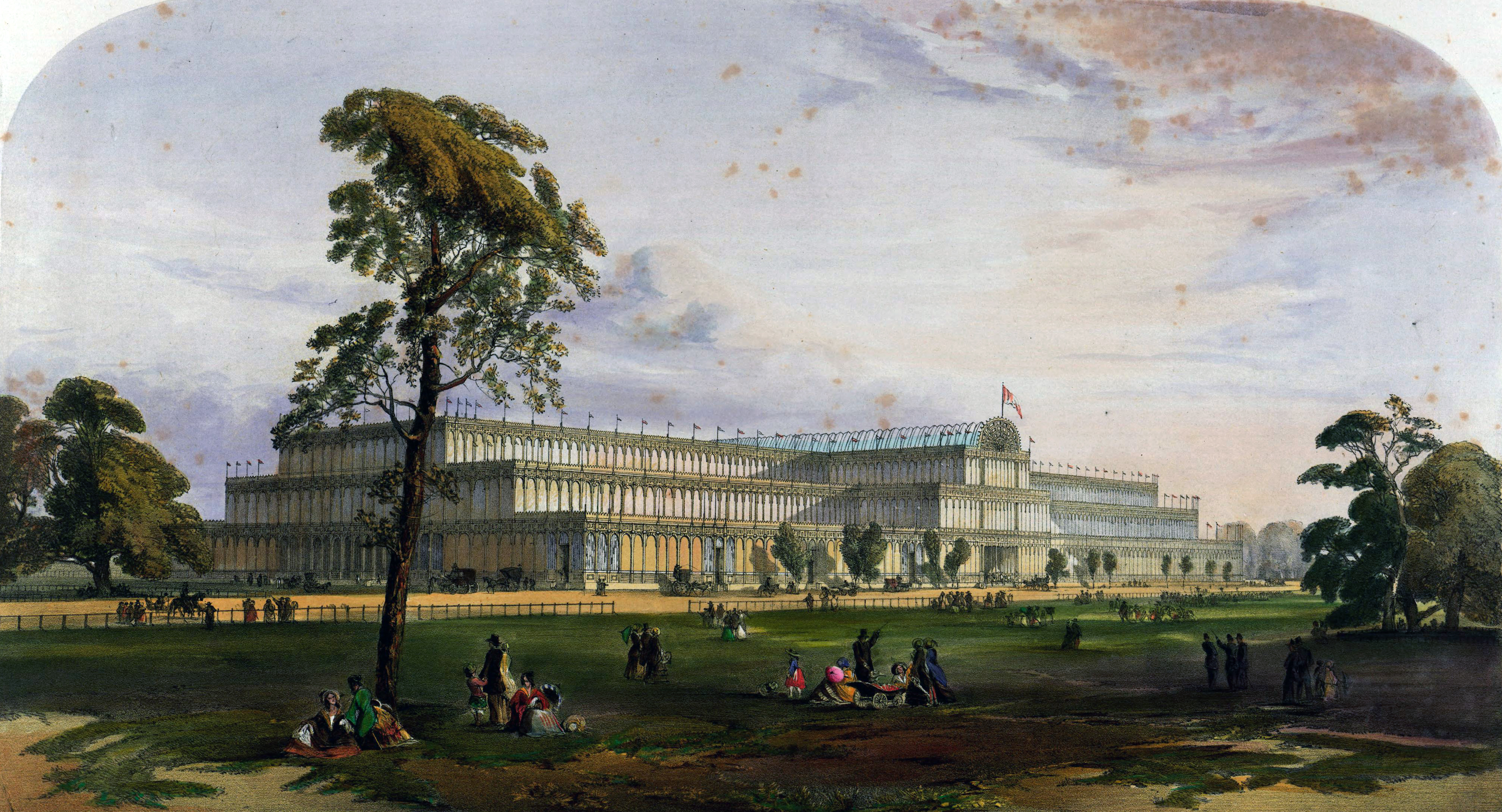
The 1851 Great Exhibition in Hyde Park

Fox and Henderson's expertise with structural ironwork led Joseph Paxton to invite them to build The Crystal Palace for the Great Exhibition of 1851. Because of its innovative modular design and construction techniques, it was ready in nine months. For their work, Fox, Cubitt and Paxton were knighted on 23 October 1851. After the exhibition they were employed by the Crystal Palace Company to move the structure to Sydenham, re-erecting and enlarging it on Sydenham Hill, thereafter known as Crystal Palace.

== Freeman Fox & Partners, Hyder Consulting ==
In 1856 Fox Henderson went into liquidation after sustaining losses building railways in Zealand, Denmark. In 1857 he established a new civil and consulting engineering practice with two of his sons, Douglas and Francis, and in 1860 formed a partnership with his two sons, the firm being known as Sir Charles Fox and Sons (later Freeman Fox & Partners; today part of Hyder Consulting).

Their engineering work included the Medway bridge at Rochester, three bridges over the Thames, a swing bridge across the River Shannon in Ireland, a bridge over the Saône at Lyon, and many bridges on the Great Western Railway. Railways upon which Fox worked included the Cork and Bandon, Thames and Medway, Portadown and Dungannon, East Kent, Lyons and Geneva, Macon and Geneva, Wiesbaden and the Zealand (Denmark) lines.

== Railways ==
Fox became an expert in narrow-gauge railways and in conjunction with George Berkley he constructed the first narrow-gauge line in India, and later constructed narrow-gauge lines in other parts of the world. Fox and Sons engineered the complex scheme of bridges and high-level lines at Battersea for the London, Brighton and South Coast Railway, London, Chatham and Dover Railway and London and South Western Railway and the approach to Victoria Station, London, including widening the bridge over the Thames.

=== List of railways ===
- East Kent Railway
- Cork and Bandon Railway
- Thames and Medway Railway
- Portadown and Dungannon Railway
- Eastern sections of the Lyon and Geneva Railway
- Mâcon and Geneva Railway
- Wiesbaden Railway
- Danish Zealand Railways
- Narrow-gauge railways in Queensland, Australia, Cape of Good Hope, South Africa and Canada
- Assisted George Berkley in 1863 with the first narrow-gauge railway in India, the Gaekwar's Baroda State Railway.

=== Other projects ===
- Bridge over the River Medway at Rochester
- Bridge over the River Thames at Barnes, Richmond, and Staines
- Station buildings for Paddington, Waterloo and Birmingham New Street

== Institutions and societies ==
Fox was also a member of the Institution of Civil Engineers from 1838 until his death, a founder member of the Institution of Mechanical Engineers from 1856 to 1871 and a fellow of the Royal Asiatic Society and Royal Geographical Society.

== Death ==
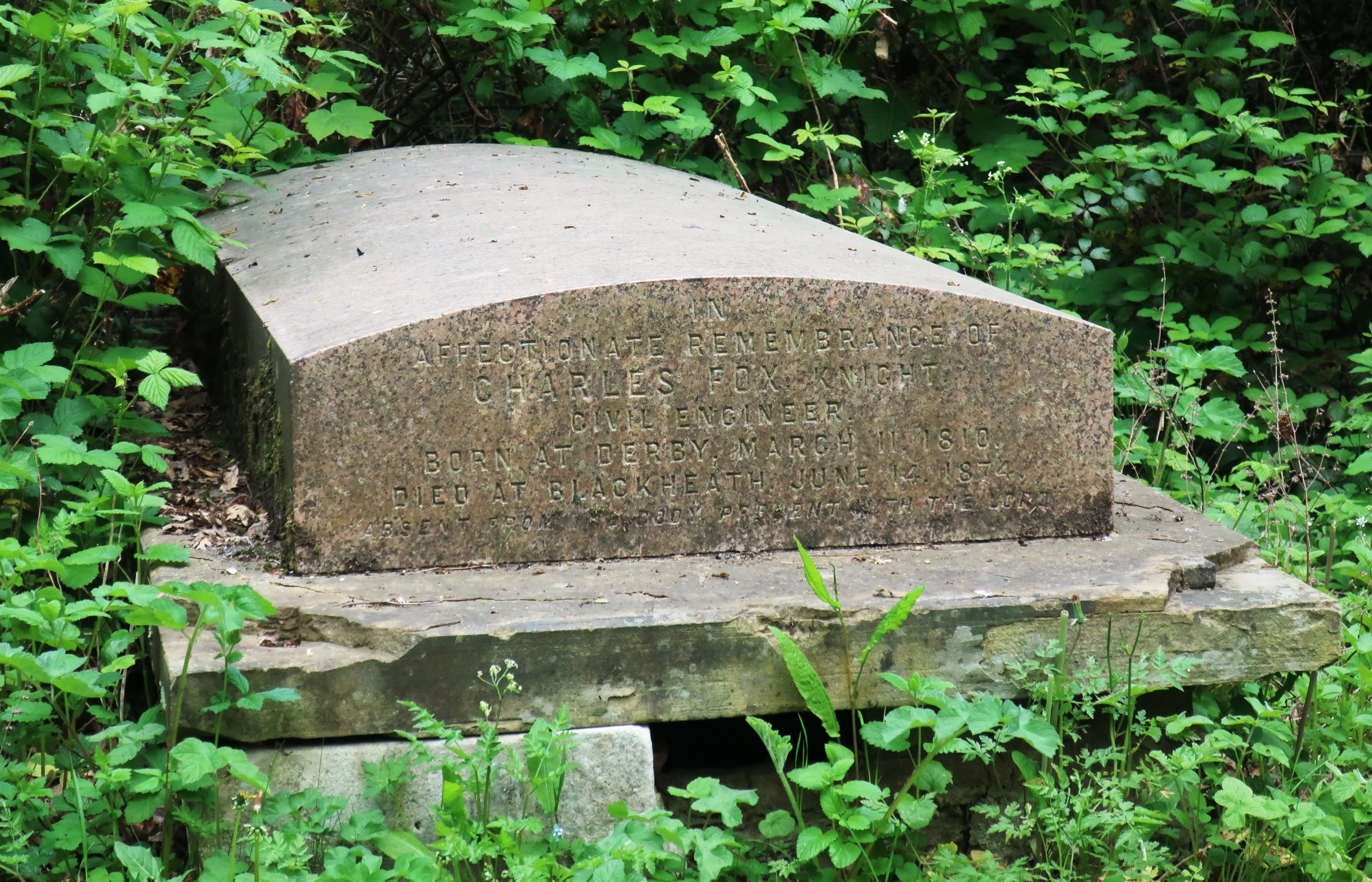
Fox's grave in Nunhead Cemetery

Sir Charles Fox died at Blackheath, London on 14 June 1874, at age 64. He was buried at Nunhead Cemetery.
