= Charles Augustus Henry Lutyens =

British painter (1829–1915)

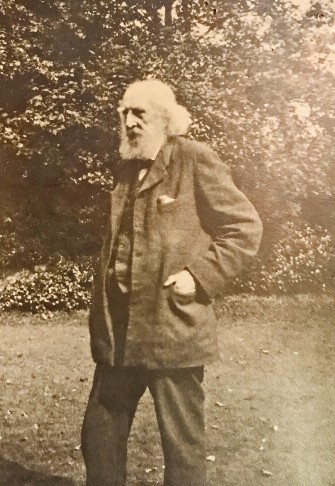
Captain Lutyens in old age

Charles Augustus Henry Lutyens (January 1829 – 19 May 1915) was an English soldier and painter.

== Origins ==
Charles Augustus Henry Lutyens was a member of a well-known military family, being the son of Major Lutyens, of Reading, Berkshire, who had been deputy commissioner to His Majesty's forces in the Peninsular War (1808-1814), and was sent to Denmark to settle the Danish claims. Four of his uncles held British Army commands, and one was an orderly officer at St. Helena. Napoleon was very fond of the uncle, and left him a brace of pistols and a lock of his hair—relics which entered the possession of the family.

== Military ==
Following the family tradition, Lutyens entered military service, distinguishing himself in the British Army and rising to the rank of captain in the 20th Regiment (afterwards the Lancashire Fusiliers). He was, apparently, the first man to organise musketry in the British Army, and was the first instructor of musketry at Hythe. At that time he was exceedingly keen on taking part in the Crimean War (1853-1856), but the authorities at first refused to allow him to go. Notwithstanding this, he persisted in his desire, and at last left for Scutari, but he was held up at Malta. Whilst on that island he invented the stadiometer, which was the first range-finder used in the Army, and which was only superseded shortly before his death. He arrived at Scutari just as the Crimean campaign ended.

== Painting ==
At the age of thirty, Lutyens forsook the Army for the world of art, in order to indulge his great love and acknowledged gift for painting. His work was well known. He exhibited at the Royal Academy for over thirty years and painted all the principal racehorses. He was an intimate friend of Edwin Landseer and of Carlo Marochetti (the sculptor, with whom he worked). Landseer was godfather to his son, Edwin Landseer Lutyens, the artist and architect, who was the designer of India's new capital. He was acquainted with all the notabilities of his time and also met William Makepeace Thackeray occasionally. His travels included a tour of the States before the American Civil War.

== "Father of the Village" ==
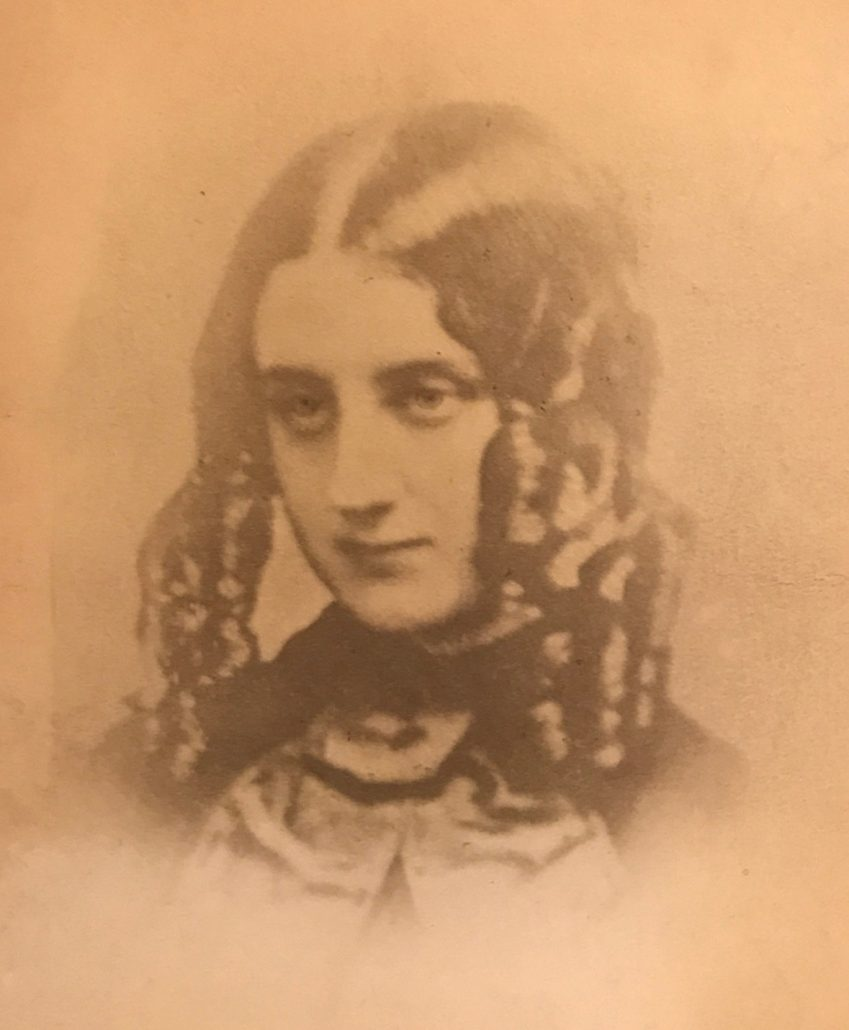
Mary Lutyens (née Gallwey)

Since he came to reside at The Cottage, Thursley, in Surrey in 1877, he endeared himself to the villagers by his large-heartedness and geniality. His friendship was greatly valued by those who moved in his circle, whilst his help and sympathy to those in lower stations of life were generous. He became known as the "father of the village", residing there for 38 years.

== Personal life ==
Lutyens was an accomplished horseman, especially in his younger days.

Lutyen married Mary Gallwey, and had eleven sons and three daughters by her; seven sons and all three daughters survived him. One son, Colonel John Lutyens, retired some time prior from the Royal Engineers. Another son, the Rev. W. E. Lutyens, was the celebrated runner of the 1890s, and his record for the 1,000 yards still held good at the time of his father's death. Mary died at Thursley in 1906, nine years before her husband.

== Death ==
Lutyens was active in the life of the village almost up to the time of his last illness. He was a regular attendant at the parish church as long as he was able to walk there. The year before his death was the first occasion on which he missed his annual regimental dinner in London. He died at home on Wednesday, 19 May 1915, at 86 years of age.

== Gallery ==
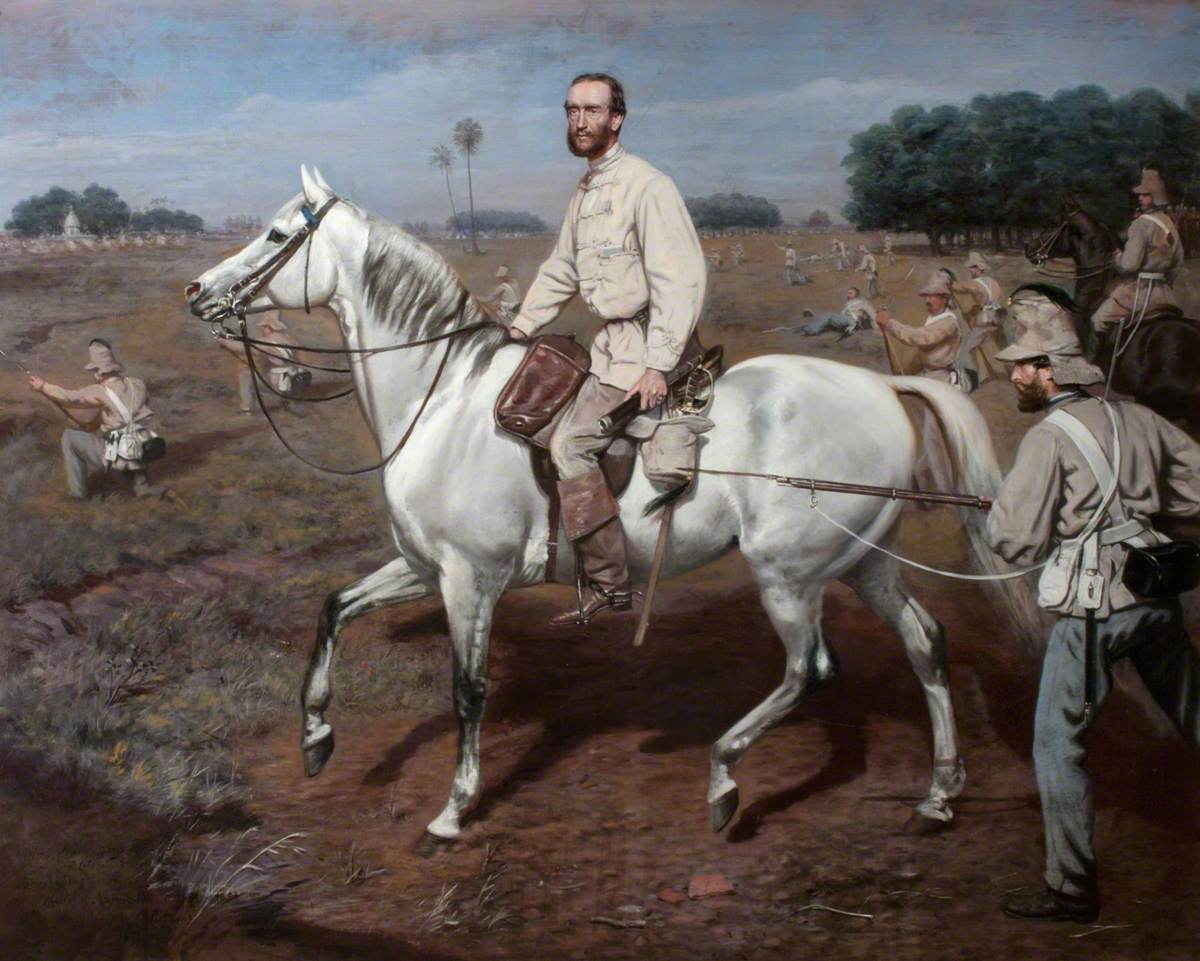
General Lord Mark Kerr in India Kit (1858)

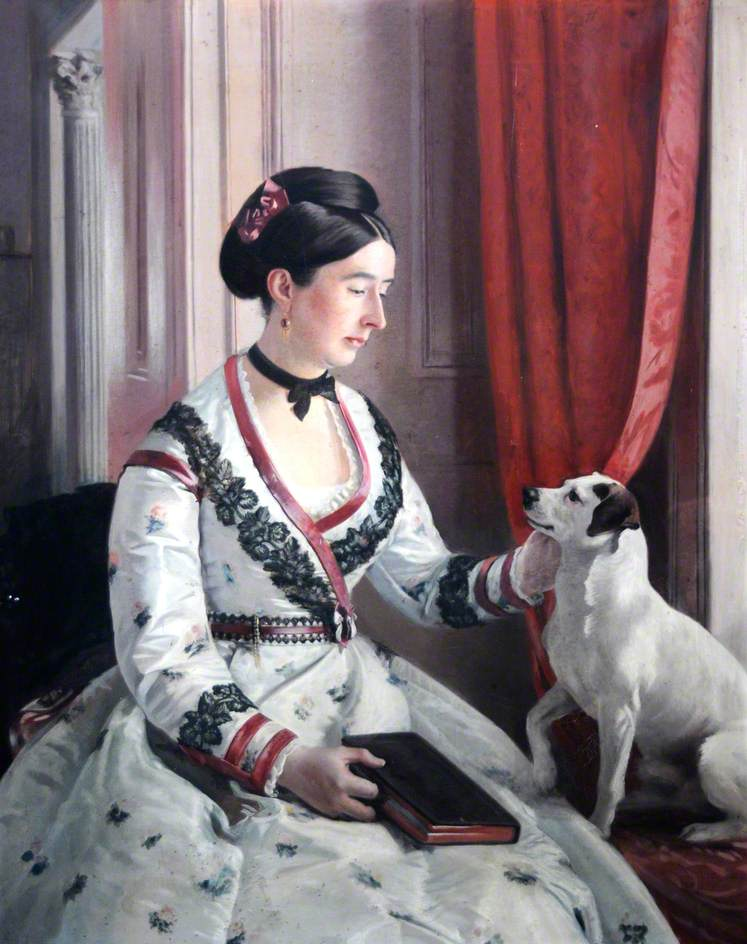
Elizabeth, Lady Hickman (1870)

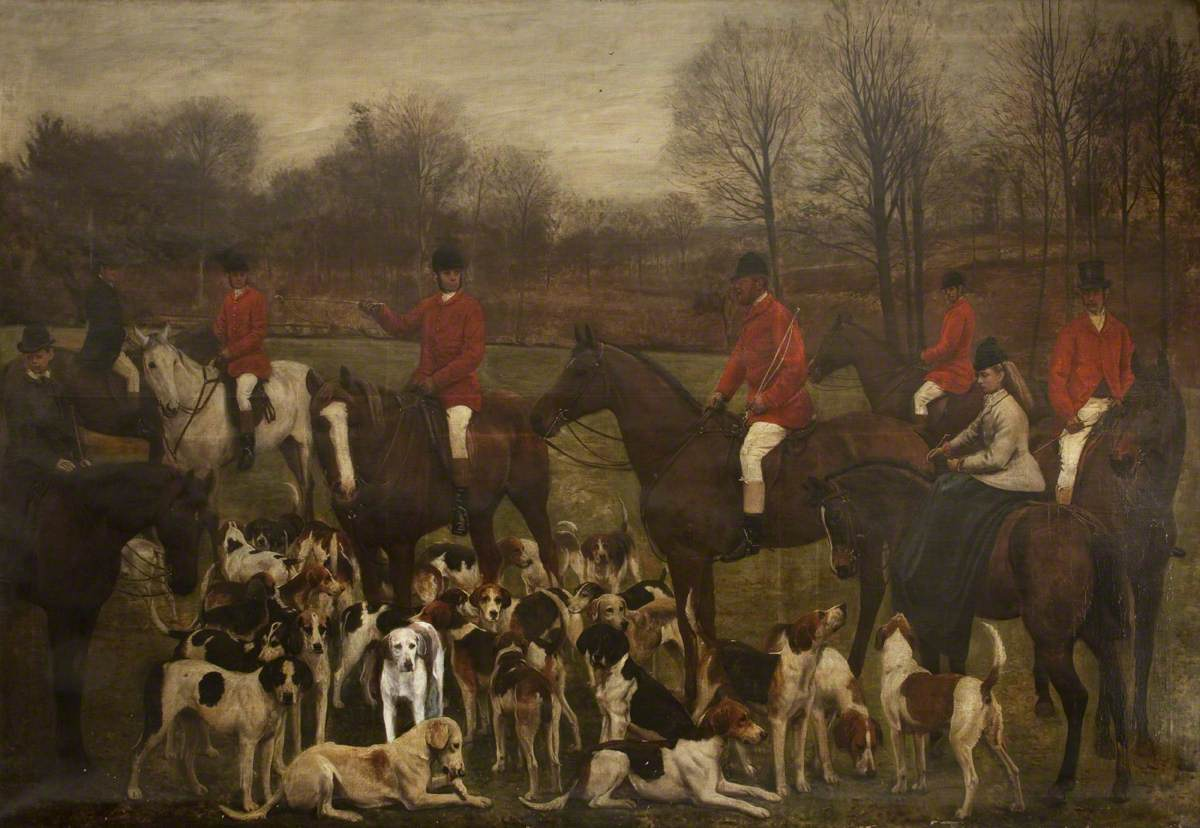
The Burnley Meet (1875)

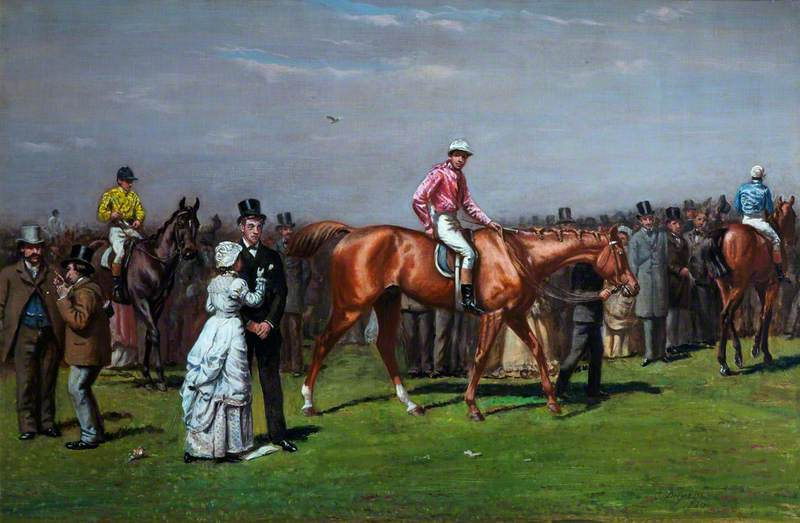
The Last of the Legacy (1880)

== Sources ==
- "Lutyens, Charles Augustus Henry". Benezit Dictionary of Artists. Oxford Art Online. Oxford University Press. 31 October 2011. Accessed 28 June 2022.
- "Thursley. Death of Captain C. H. A. Lutyens. An Interesting Personality". The Surrey Advertiser and County Times. Saturday, 22 May 1915. p. 12.
