= Lord Mark Kerr (British Army officer, born 1817) =

British Army officer (1817–1900)

General Lord Mark Kerr GCB
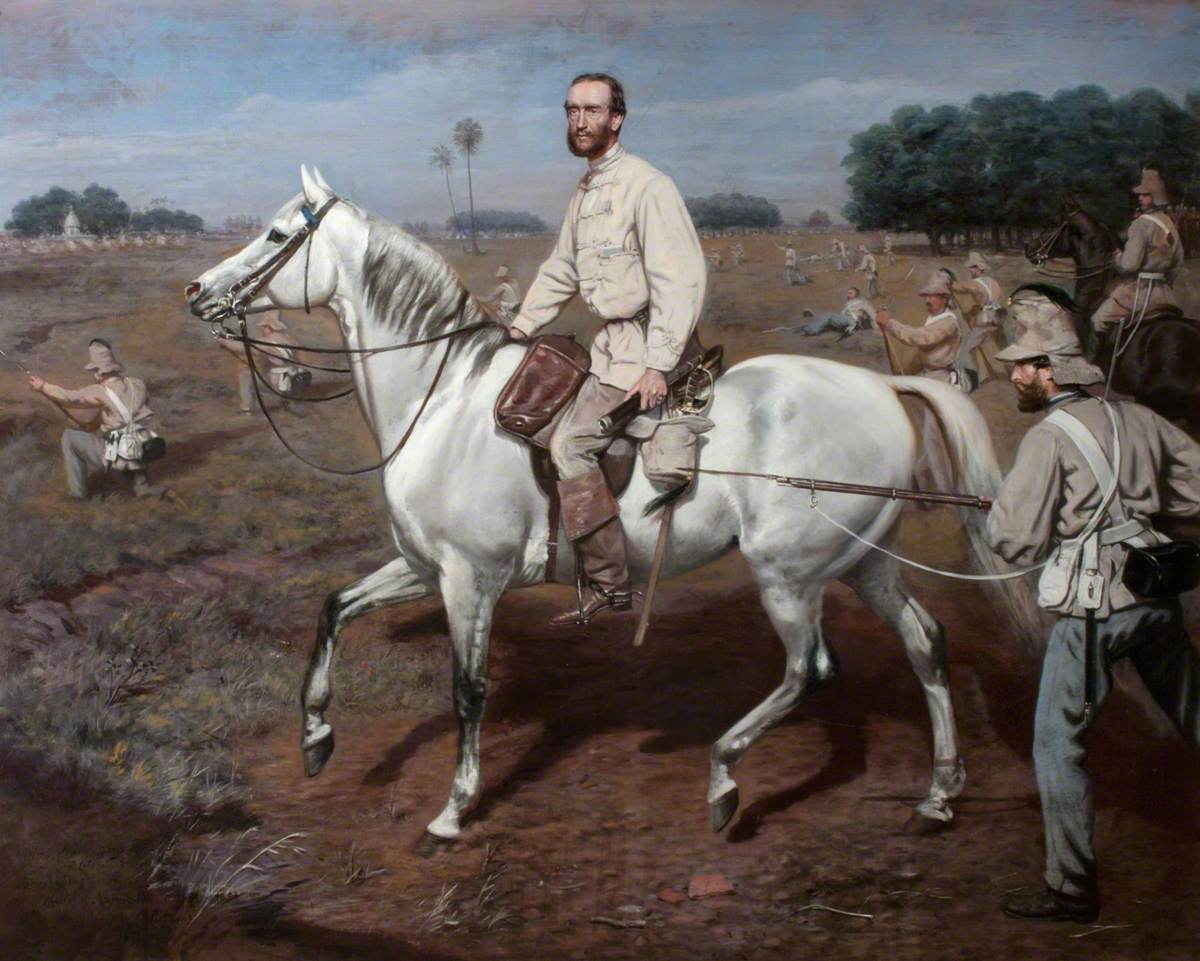
- General Lord Mark Kerr in India Kit, equestrian portrait by Charles Lutyens, 1858
- Born: 15 December 1817; Newbattle Abbey, Midlothian, Scotland
- Died: 17 May 1900 (aged 82); London
- Military career
- Allegiance: United Kingdom
- Branch: British Army
- Rank: General
- Units: 20th (East Devonshire) Regiment of Foot; 13th (1st Somersetshire) (Prince Albert's Light Infantry) Regiment of Foot
- Commands: 13th (Prince Albert's Own) Regiment of Light Infantry; Poona Division of the Bombay Army
- Conflicts: Crimean War; Indian Rebellion
- Awards: GCB, CB

General Lord Mark Ralph George Kerr GCB (15 December 1817 – 17 May 1900) was a British Army officer who served in the Crimean War and in India.

== Background ==
Kerr was born in his ancestral home (Newbattle Abbey), in Midlothian, Scotland in 1817; the son of William Kerr, 6th Marquess of Lothian and his second wife Lady Harriet Scott (daughter of the 3rd Duke of Buccleuch). He was one of 12 Kerr siblings from two mothers.

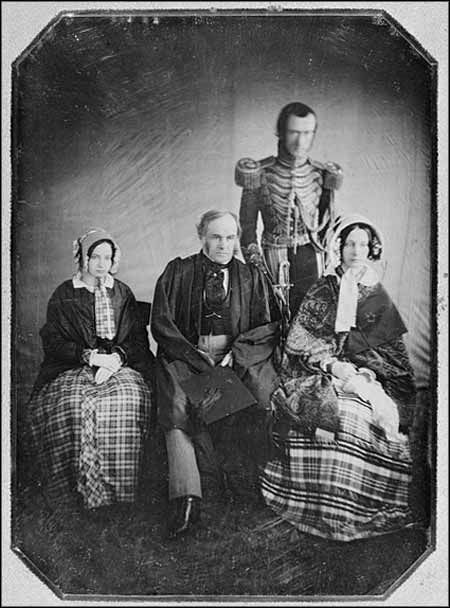
Lord Mark Kerr (standing, in dress uniform) with the Earl and Countess of Elgin and Lady Alice Lambton, the countess' younger sister (seated left) in 1848. Elgin was Governor General of Canada at the time.

== Military career ==
Kerr was commissioned (by purchase) into the army on 19 June 1835 as an ensign in the 20th (East Devonshire) Regiment of Foot and served in the Crimean War and various campaigns in India, including the Indian Mutiny. From 1842 to 1853 Kerr served with his regiment, which was a reserve battalion stationed in Bermuda and Canada. His military career summary is as follows:

- 14 September 1838 Promoted lieutenant (by purchase)
- 26 June 1840 Promoted captain (by purchase)
- 27 September 1841 Embarked with regiment for overseas service
- 1842-1847 Serving with regiment in Bermuda
- 1848-1853 Serving with regiment in Canada
- 25 July 1851 Promoted major (by purchase)
- 30 December 1853 Promoted lieutenant colonel (by purchase)
- 1854 Serving with regiment in Winchester, England
- 22 December 1854 Took command of the 13th (1st Somersetshire) (Prince Albert's Light Infantry) Regiment of Foot
- 30 June 1855 Commanded 13th Light Infantry in the Crimean War (at battles of Tchernaya and fall of Sebastopol)
- 1857 Commanded the 13th Light Infantry in the Indian Mutiny
- 5 April 1858 Led a small but successful force that defeated far larger enemy forces at the Siege of Azimghur, India
- 28 September 1858 Appointed Companion of the Order of the Bath (CB)
- September 1862 Promoted Brigadier-General
- 1865 Left the 13th Light Infantry
- 6 March 1868 Promoted Major-General
- 1874 Commanded the Poona Division of the Bombay Army
- 13 July 1876 Promoted Lieutenant General
- 11 November 1878 Promoted General
- 1881 Birthday Honours Advanced to Knight Commander of the Order of the Bath (KCB)
- 1893 Birthday Honours Advanced to Knight Grand Cross of the Order of the Bath (GCB)
- 1877 Appointed regimental colonel of the 54th Regiment of Foot until 1880
- 22 February 1880 Appointed regimental colonel of the successor of the 13th Light Infantry Regiment, i.e. the Somerset Light Infantry (Prince Albert's); a post he held until his death in 1900.

The Kerr family's association with the 13th Light Infantry was a longstanding one, as an earlier Lord Mark Kerr had a colonelcy in the regiment in its early years.

He published a journal of his military experiences and travels.

== Death ==
He died a bachelor in London in 1900.

== See also ==
- Battle of the Chernaya
- Siege of Sevastopol (1854–1855)
- Indian Rebellion of 1857
- British Indian Army
