= Francis Fox (civil engineer) =

English civil engineer

Sir Francis Fox
- Born: 29 June 1844; Paddington, London, England
- Died: 7 January 1927 (aged 82); Wimbledon, London, England
- Occupation: Civil engineer
- Spouse(s): Selena Wright (m. 1869; died 1900) Agnes Horne (m. 1901)
- Children: 3
- Father: Sir Charles Fox

Sir Francis Fox (29 June 1844 – 7 January 1927) was an English civil engineer, who was responsible for the bridges over the Victoria Falls of the Zambesi and Sydney Harbour, the Mersey Railway Tunnel and the Liverpool Overhead Railway, and extending the London Underground.

== Personal life ==
Born in Derby, England, he was one of three sons of the noted engineer and contractor Sir Charles Fox.

Educated at Highgate School, Brighton College and Tonbridge School,

He married twice, in 1869 to Selena Wright who died in 1900, he then married Agnes Horne in 1901. Fox had a son and three daughters from his first marriage. In 1902, his daughter, Frances Emily married Reverend Walter Weston, the English clergyman and Anglican missionary who helped popularise recreational mountaineering in Japan. She accompanied Weston on many of his expeditions in the Japanese Alps.

He was awarded a Knighthood by the King on 25 July 1912.

== Civil engineering ==
Fox entered into business with his father and his brother Douglas in 1857 and in 1860 they formed the partnership of Sir Charles Fox and Sons. Fox was a consultant for the Simplon Tunnel. He was responsible for designing the train shed for the through platforms at Bristol Temple Meads which was completed in 1878, (Note: There is confusion about which Francis Fox worked on Temple Meads station. The Institution of Civil Engineers says that the Bristol and Exeter Railway's engineer (Francis Fox, born 1818) instigated the redevelopment work but does not explicitly state that he was responsible for the train shed. Grace's Guide states that it was this one (Francis Fox, born 1844) but there is no mention of it in his autobiography.) and was an engineer for the Great Central Railway, working with his brother Douglas and H.W. Braddock in the construction of that company's London Marylebone station in 1889. He also assisted Douglas in the construction of the Liverpool Overhead Railway, which was opened in 1893.

Fox assisted in shoring-up of several cathedrals including St Paul's Cathedral and Winchester Cathedral in 1905.

== Works ==
- Fox, Sir Francis (1924). Sixty-three Years of Engineering. John Murray.
