= Douglas Fox (engineer) =

English civil engineer (1840–1921)

Sir Douglas Fox
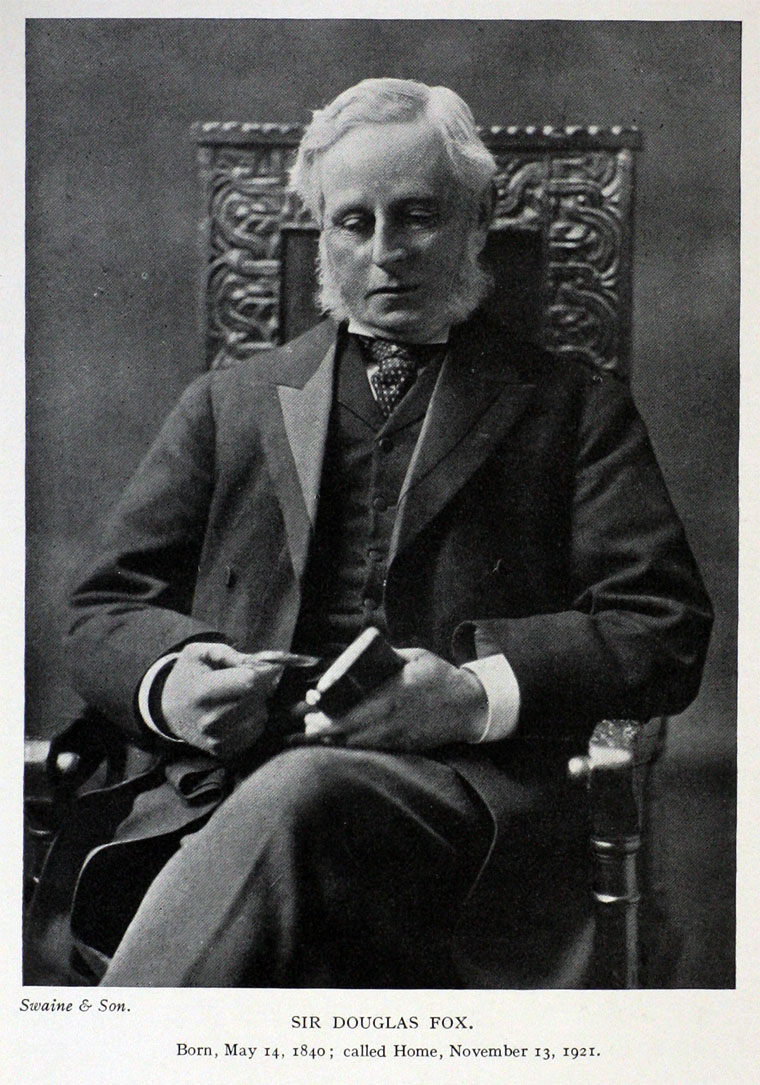
- Born: 14 May 1840; Smethwick, Staffordshire, England
- Died: 13 November 1921 (aged 81)
- Spouse: Mary Wright (m. 1863; died 1920)
- Children: 5
- Parent: Sir Charles Fox (father)
- Engineering career
- Discipline: Civil
- Institutions: Institution of Civil Engineers (president)

Sir Charles Douglas Fox (14 May 1840 – 13 November 1921) was an English civil engineer.

== Early life ==
Douglas was born in Smethwick, Staffordshire, the oldest son of Sir Charles Fox and had two brothers and a sister. Sir Charles was a civil engineer and had designed, amongst other things, The Crystal Palace in Hyde Park. Douglas was educated at Cholmondeley School, also known as Highgate School, from 1851 to 1854 and King's College School from 1854 to 1855. He studied at King's College London from 1855 to 1857 and was to have studied further at Trinity College, Cambridge but the financial collapse of his father's contracting company in 1857 ended his education. Douglas was instead articled to his father who had set up an engineering consultancy, Sir Charles Fox and Sons.

Douglas was a member of the Church of England and was active in the Church Mission Society as well as being the author of several academic papers.

He married Mary Wright, daughter of Francis Wright and Selina FitzHerbert in 1863 with whom he had one son and four daughters. Douglas’ brother, Sir Francis Fox, married his wife’s sister, Selina Wright.

== Early engineering projects ==
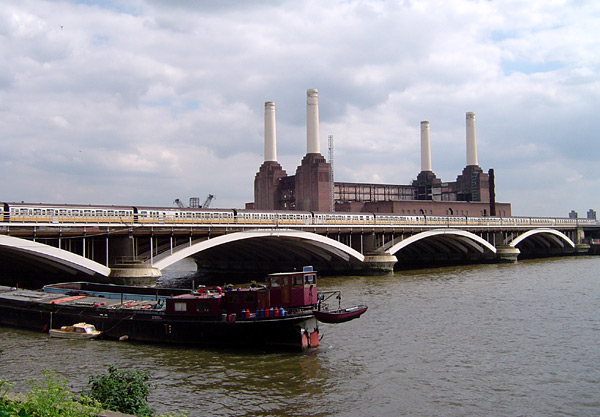
The Grosvenor Bridge, London

In 1863 Douglas was made a partner and by 1865 the firm was involved in major projects in Britain, the US, Canada, southern Africa, India, Australia, and South America. From 1863 to 1866 Douglas and his father worked on the design of the railway viaducts and bridges at Battersea which would separate the lines coming from Waterloo from those from Victoria. This process also included the widening of Grosvenor Bridge from two to seven tracks.

== Military service ==
Douglas served as an officer in the Volunteer Force London Rifle Volunteer Brigade and was commissioned as an ensign in that unit on 17 June 1861. He received promotion to Lieutenant in that unit, since renamed the London Rifle Volunteer Corps, on 18 November 1863. During this period Douglas held several patents including one for "improvements in machinery for nicking and dressing the heads of screw-blanks" which was approved on 28 April 1868, one for "improvements in the manufacture of method of repairing railway rails and other iron in a permanent way and in the machinery to be employed therein" on 30 July 1868 and one for "improvements in screw cutting and threading machines and in the construction of screw nails and spikes" on 30 April 1866. The latter two patents expired after a seven-year period for non-payment of stamp duty required for a patent extension. Douglas was also a member of the Institution of Civil Engineers by 1873.

== Douglas Fox & Partners ==
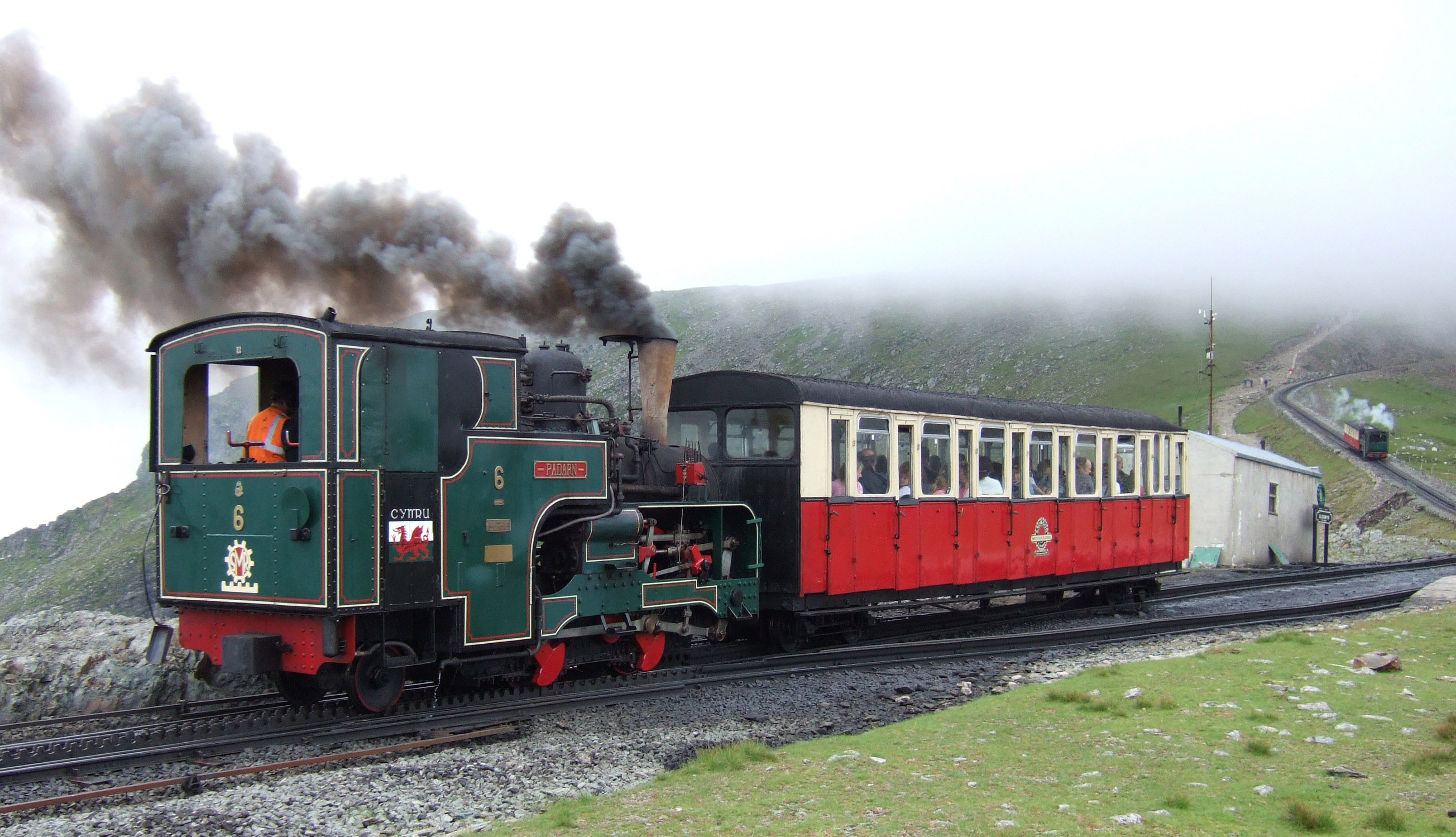
The Snowdon Mountain Railway

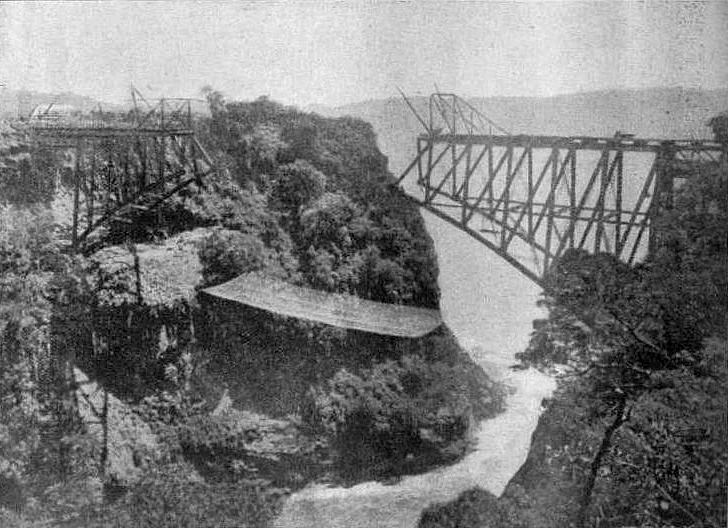
Victoria Falls Bridge, 1905

The family firm remained solely a father and son enterprise until Sir Charles' death in 1874 upon which Douglas became senior partner of what was now Douglas Fox & Partners. At this stage Douglas' brother Francis also became a partner of the firm.

Douglas was involved with the construction of the Snowdon Mountain Railway and the extension of the Great Central Railway from Rugby to London including the terminal at Marylebone Station. He worked on several of London's early tube lines including the Great Northern and City tube, the Hampstead tube which linked Charing Cross with Golders Green and Highgate, and the unsuccessful North West London Railway project. Douglas was, with James Greathead, joint engineer of the Liverpool Overhead Railway which was the first electric elevated city railway in the world.

Further afield Douglas was involved with the design of much of the Cape Colony railways, the whole Rhodesia railway system, which included the 500 ft span Victoria Falls Bridge, the Benguela Railway in Angola, and several railways in South America. The firm were consulting engineers to the Central Argentine Railway; the South Indian Railway; the Southern São Paulo Railway and the Dorada Railway.

Sir Ralph Freeman, one of the firm's chief engineers, most notably worked on the Victoria Falls Bridge (1905) and the Sydney Harbour Bridge (1932). Freeman rose to become senior partner, and in 1938 the firm changed its name to Freeman Fox & Partners, and later Acer Freeman Fox. Following several mergers, the firm is now part of Arcadis.

== Honours and awards ==
On 8 March 1886 Douglas was knighted at Windsor Castle by Queen Victoria for his work with James Brunlees on the Mersey Railway Tunnel and a railway linking Birkenhead with Liverpool.

In 1887 he was made an honorary fellow of his alma mater, King's College London and from November 1899 to November 1900 served as president of the Institution of Civil Engineers. In 1900, Fox was elected an honorary member of the American Society of Mechanical Engineers.

== Death ==
He died on 13 November 1921 in Kensington, at the home of one of his daughters; Mary had died the year before.

The firm became Freeman, Fox and Partners in 1938 after Ralph Freeman, who had worked for the firm since 1901, became a partner. In 1988 it became Acer Freeman Fox and is now known as Hyder Consulting (since taken over by Dutch-based Arcadis.

Professional and academic associations
Preceded by William Henry Preece	President of the Institution of Civil Engineers; November 1899 – November 1900	Succeeded by James Mansergh
