= Charles Waters (evangelist) =

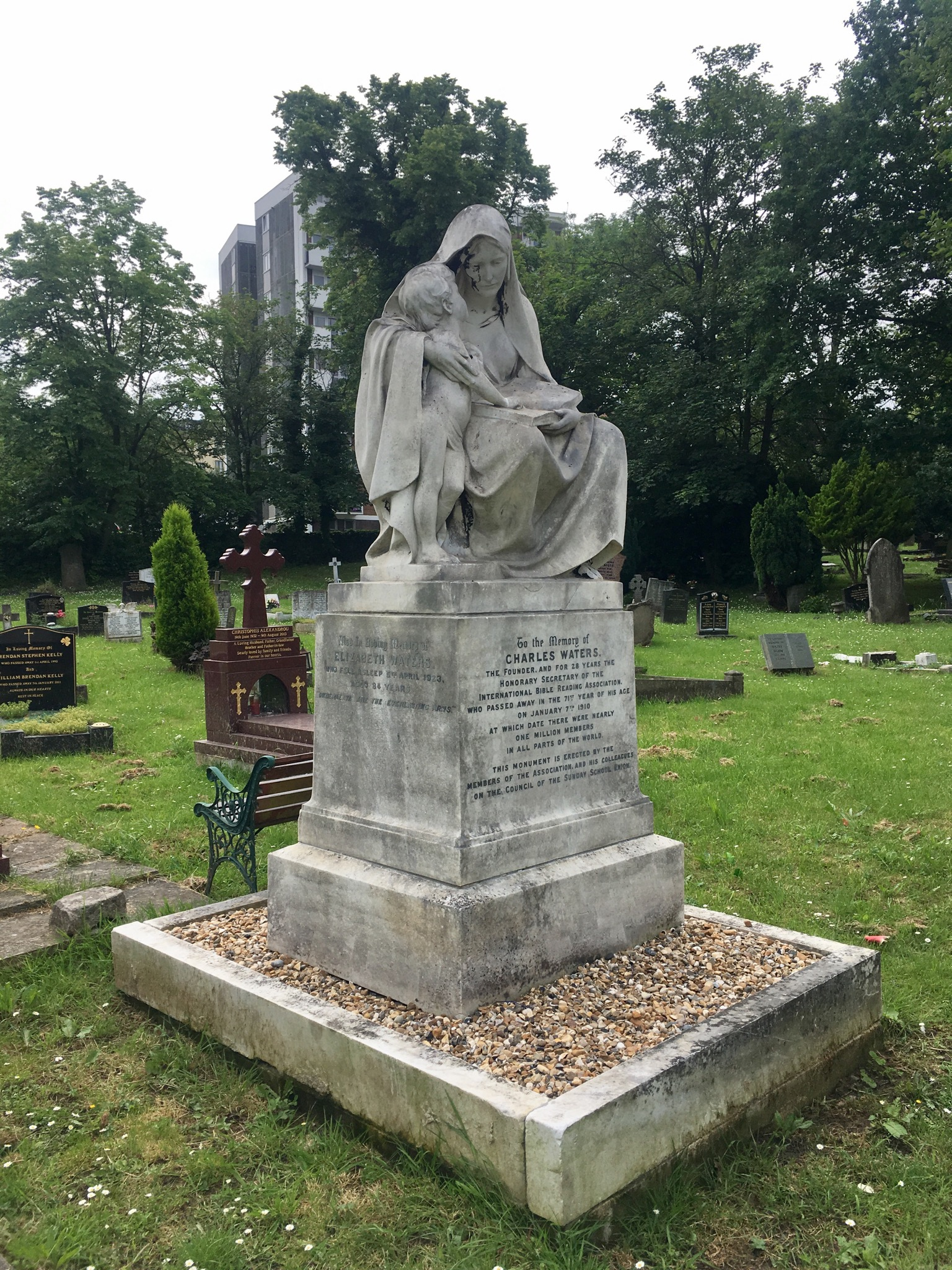
The tomb of Waters in Camberwell Old Cemetery

Charles Waters was an evangelical Christian who founded the International Bible Reading Association (IBRA). In his professional life he worked as a bank manager for the London and County Bank.

Waters was born in Loose, near Maidstone in Kent on 22 September 1839. He converted to Christianity at a young age and was baptised by Reverend David Cranbrook in Maidstone. He attended and started leading Sunday school lessons in Maidstone and preached at the Bethel Chapel in the town. After moving to London he was attracted by the charismatic sermons of the young Charles Spurgeon at his New Park Street Chapel in Southwark. Waters joined the evangelical campaigns of Spurgeon around south London, at services at the Surrey Gardens Music Hall and started teaching at the new Metropolitan Tabernacle.

He extensively travelled with his work with the IBRA in Europe and the United States. He addressed the World Sunday School Convention in St. Louis in 1893 and visited the 1893 World's Columbian Exposition and Niagara Falls on his trip. Waters visited Scandinavia in 1904 and presided over the in IBRA World Sunday School Convention in Rome in 1907. He visited Louisville in 1908 and Switzerland in 1909. The IBRA received more than 8,000 pieces of correspondence between December 1899 and January 1900. Waters wrote the IBRA's Hints on the Daily Readings and Circular Readings and issued the quarterly monthly magazine Silver Link which reported on the global activities of the IBRA. Water's nom de plume was "The Man Behind the Wheel" when writing in Silver Link.

Waters worked as the manager of the King's Cross branch of the London and County Bank for 25 years. He lived at 26 Montrell Road in Streatham Hill before moving to Angell Town in Brixton.

Waters died on 7 January 1910 following a medical operation. He was buried in Camberwell Old Cemetery in Camberwell in south-east London. His marble tomb was listed Grade II on the National Heritage List for England in May 1992. His funeral was held at the Metropolitan Tabernacle.

Following his death the Sunday School Union published a monograph on Waters, Charles Waters: The founder of the International Bible Reading Association, written by Robert Latimer Sloan. The preface was written by Sir Francis Flint Belsey, the chairman of the council of the Sunday School Union.

Waters' friend, Charles Spurgeon, nicknamed him "Cold Waters". Waters married a Ms. Goodwin at Spurgeon's New Park Street Chapel and the couple had five children; three girls and two boys.
