= Francis John Waring =

British civil railway engineer (1843–1924)

Francis John Waring CMG MInstCE FRGS
- Born: 25 October 1843
- Died: 6 February 1924 (aged 80)
- Occupation: Railway civil engineer
- Children: 4

Francis John Waring (25 October 1843 – 6 February 1924) was a British railway civil engineer. He established railway networks in many British colonies and dominions from the 1870s to the 1920s.

== Early life and education ==
Waring was born on 25 October 1843 in Southsea, Hampshire, the son of Francis Waring. He was educated at Faversham Grammar School, and King's College School.

== Career ==
Waring received his training at the office of George Bidder and was a pupil of William Kingsbury. In 1863, aged 20, he went to India and worked on the survey of the Indus Valley Railway and later on the Delhi Railway. From 1872 to 1875, he was employed in Brazil on the Sao Francisco and Tocantins Railway survey. In 1875, he was appointed civil engineer to the Government of Ceylon, and from 1882 to 1896, served as Chief Resident Engineer, while also serving for a year as acting general manager of the Ceylon Government Railway. In Ceylon, he built major railway extensions, various mountain railways, and made a survey for the Adam's Bridge to connect Ceylon and India.

Waring left Ceylon in 1896, returned to England, and established an engineering practice in London. From 1898 to 1921, he was railway consulting and inspecting engineer to the Crown Agents for the Colonies and worked in many colonies and dominions throughout the British Empire, including Government railways in Ceylon, the Federated Malay States and the Straits Settlements, Trinidad, Nyasaland, British North Borneo, and Cape of Good Hope railways.

== Personal life and death ==
Waring married Mary Harries in 1883 and they had four daughters. Waring was elected Fellow of his school King's College School, London, in 1908. He was a Fellow of the Royal Geographical Society (FRGS). He was the author of various papers for the Institution of Civil Engineers two of which won the Telford and the Crampton prize.

Waring died on 6 February 1924, aged 80.

== Honours ==
Waring was appointed Companion of the Order of St Michael and St George (CMG) in the 1893 Birthday Honours.
