= James John Berkley =

English civil engineer

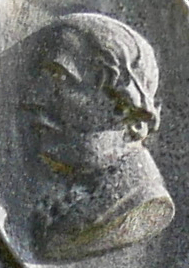
- Born: 21 October 1819; Holloway, England
- Died: 26 August 1862 (aged 42); Sydenham, England
- Occupation: Civil engineer

James John Berkley (21 October 1819 – 26 August 1862) was an English civil engineer. He was chief resident engineer of the Great Indian Peninsula Railway.

== Biography ==
Berkley was born at Holloway on 21 October 1819. He was educated at King's College, London, and articled in 1836 to Mr. Wicksteed, C.E., but soon entered the office of Mr. G. P. Bidder. In 1839 Berkley began his real pupilage under Robert Stephenson, whose intimate friendship he enjoyed to the end of his life. During his period of training he was constantly employed by Stephenson in writing reports on works and arbitrations. Stephenson formed a high opinion of Berkeley, and obtained for him an appointment as chief resident engineer of the Churnet and Trent Valley railways. At the end of 1849, on the strong recommendation of Stephenson, Isambard Kingdom Brunel, William Cubitt, John Rennie, Bidder, and other eminent engineers, Berkley was appointed chief resident engineer of the Great Indian Peninsula Railway, and in this capacity he constructed the first line of railway that was opened in India. In January 1850 he left England for India. Having first decided on a scheme for the construction of a short line of thirty-three miles from Bombay to Callian, he turned his attention to the extensions of the railway, and especially to the great work involved in carrying the line over the Western Ghâts Mountains, and designed two great inclines ascending mountains more than 2,000 feet high—the Bhore Ghât and the Thul Ghât. In 1852 the surveys were begun, and four years were spent in surveying the Bhore Ghât. On 16 April 1863 the first twenty miles of the line from Bombay to Tanna were opened for public traffic, thus initiating the Indian railway system. In 1856 the north-eastern line by the Thul Ghât was sanctioned by the Indian government, thus completing the Great Indian Peninsula system projected by Berkley, comprising a total length of 1,237 miles, and forming a grand trunk communication by the north-eastern line between Bombay, Calcutta, and the north-west, and by the south-eastern line between Bombay and Madras, including also an important line to Nagpore.

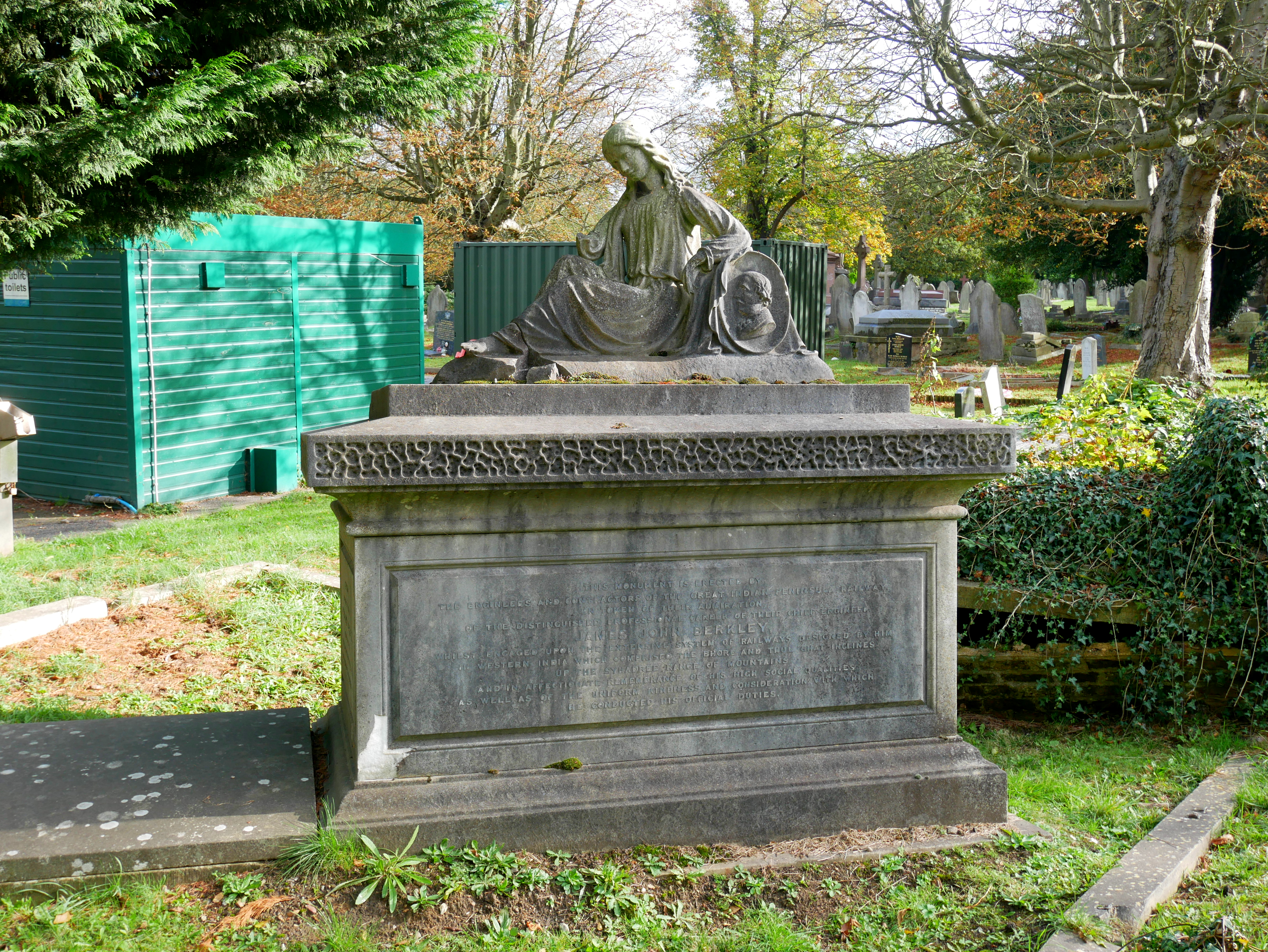
Monument to James John Berkley in Camberwell Old Cemetery

In all these operations Berkley evinced the highest technical skill, firmness, and tact. He was a zealous advocate of the contract system, then regarded with some suspicion by the government, and he was strongly in favour of the employment of native agency. This gained him great popularity with the natives of Bombay. On his return to England, Stephenson said of him that "he had succeeded not only in engineering matter .. . but in the more difficult task of engineering men." Berkley gave the details of his great engineering work in an address to the Mechanics' Institute of Bombay. He took an active part in the scientific and other useful institutions of Bombay, and evinced always an especial interest in the Mechanics' Institute, where a "Berkley gold medal" was founded in his name. In 1855 he became a magistrate; in 1857 a commissioner of the Bombay Municipal Board, and in 1858 a member of the Senate of Bombay University. His health failing, Berkley came in 1856 to England, but revisited India to see his cherished work on the Bhore Ghât fully developed. Compelled, however, by ill-health to leave India, he returned to England in April 1861, but his constitution was imdermined by hard work in a tropical climate, and he died at Sydenham on 26 August 1862 at the comparatively early age of 42. The directors of the Great Indian Peninsula Railway passed a resolution at his death, mentioning him in terms of the highest praise, and directing that a tablet to his memory should be erected in a conspicuous position on the Bhore Ghât incline, and a sum of 8,000l. was raised by the engineers of the railway staff and others for the erection of a monument over his grave, and for the foundation of a Berkley fellowship in his memory at Bombay University. Berkley was a great reader, a clear writer, and a good speaker. He was elected a member of the Institute of Civil Engineers on 4 December 1856, and in 1860 his paper, read before the institute, gained for him the Telford Medal and a council premium of books.

Berkley was buried at Camberwell Old Cemetery. His brother George Berkley was also an engineer.
