= Daniel Morris (botanist) =

British botanist (1844–1933)

- Born: 26 May 1844; Loughor, Swansea, Wales
- Died: 9 February 1933 (aged 88); Boscombe
- Scientific career
- Fields: Botany
- Author abbrev. (botany): D.Morris

Sir Daniel Morris KCMG FLS (1844–1933) was a British administrator, horticulturist and botanist, who worked mainly in the Caribbean region. He was knighted in 1903.

== Biography ==
After public school at Cheltenham, he was educated at the Royal College of Science in South Kensington, and at Trinity College Dublin, where he took first class honours in natural science. From 1877 to 1879 he was assistant director of the Royal Botanic Gardens in Ceylon, where he studied coffee leaf rust. He married in 1879. From 1879 to 1886 he was Director of the Botanic Department in Jamaica; he collected botanical specimens in British Honduras in 1882. From 1886 to 1898 he was assistant director (under William Thiselton-Dyer) of the Royal Botanic Gardens, Kew. From 1898 to 1908 Morris was Imperial Commissioner, West Indian Agricultural Department. From 1908 to 1913 he was Scientific Advisor in Tropical Agriculture to the Colonial Office.

Even when not working in the Caribbean, he visited it on various scientific missions and his substantial output of books and articles on agricultural matters is chiefly concerned with the Caribbean. He became a Vice-President of the Royal Horticultural Society and of the Royal Empire Society and died on 9 February 1933.

== Selected publications ==
- A catalogue of the most interesting forest trees, ornamental trees & shrubs, fruit trees, foliage plants, &c., &c., suitable for distribution. Colombo: W.H. Herbert, government printer. 1879.
- Notes on Liberian Coffee, Its History and Cultivation. Kingston, Jamaica: Government Printing Office. 1881.
- Cacao: How to Grow and How to Cure It. Kingston, Jamaica: Government Publishing Office. 1882.
- The Mungoose on Sugar Estates in the West Indies. 1882.
- The Colony of British Honduras. London: Edward Stanford. 1883.
- Fruit as a Factor in Colonial Commerce. 1887.
- The Vegetable Resources of the West Indies. 1888.
