= John Fretcheville Dykes Donnelly =

British major-general and royal engineer

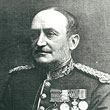
- Born: 2 July 1834; Bay of Bombay
- Died: 5 April 1902 (aged 67); London
- Occupations: Major-general and royal engineer

Sir John Fretcheville Dykes Donnelly CB KCB (2 July 1834 – 5 April 1902) was a British major-general and royal engineer.

== Biography ==
Donnelly was born in the Bay of Bombay on 2 July 1834. He was the only child of Lieutenant-colonel Thomas Donnelly (1802–1881), at one time deputy adjutant-general of the Bombay army, and from 1851 staff captain and afterwards staff officer at the East India Company's military college at Addiscombe until the closing of the college in 1861 (see Vibart's Addiscombe, with portrait). His mother was Jane Christiana, second daughter of Joseph Ballantine Dykes of Dovenby Hall, Cumberland. Educated at Highgate School (1843–8), he entered the Royal Military Academy at Woolwich at the head of the list after a year's private tuition in August 1849, passed out first, and received a commission as second-lieutenant in the royal engineers on 23 June 1853, and after professional instruction at Chatham was promoted first-lieutenant on 17 February. Going out to the Crimea in June, Donnelly joined his corps on its march to Balaklava on 23 September, and next month was detailed for duty with the left attack on Sevastopol. He was present at the battle of Inkerman on 5 November, and subsequently worked in the trenches before Sevastopol with an energy to which Sir John Burgoyne called Lord Raglan's attention (21 November). Through the severe weather of the winter of 1854-5 he was on duty in the trenches forty-one times by day and forty-three times by night. On the day after the abortive assault on the Redan (18 June), when he was with the second column, he by his promptitude and zeal obtained a substantial lodgment in the Russian rifle pits at the Little Mamelon. Donnelly was mentioned in Lord Raglan's despatches for this service. Soon after the fall of Sevastopol in September during which he was thrice in all mentioned in despatches (London Gazette, 18 December), he was appointed aide-de-camp to Colonel E. T. Lloyd on 12 November 1855, the commanding royal engineer in the Crimea, and accompanied him home in June 1856. He received the Crimea medal with clasps for Inkerman and Sevastopol, the Turkish medal, and the 5th class of the legion of honour. He had been recommended for the Victoria Cross without result, and received no promotion nor British distinction.

Joining the London military district in 1856, he was placed in command of a detachment of royal sappers and miners employed in preparing for building purposes the ground purchased at South Kensington out of the surplus funds of the Great Exhibition of 1851. It was intended to erect there a permanent museum and centre of science and art. Sir Henry Cole, the director of the scheme, secured Donnelly's services on 1 April 1858 in reorganising at South Kensington the science and art department, which was controlled by the privy council's committee of education. On 1 October 1859 he was appointed inspector for science in connection with the department. He had been promoted second captain on 1 April 1859, and was now seconded in his corps for ten years. But he did not return to regimental duty, and the rest of his career was identified with South Kensington. In 1869 he was allowed two and a half years' special leave, and in 1872 was placed on the reserve list. His promotion continued, as he was still liable for emergency service, and he became lieutenant-colonel on 1 October 1877 and brevet-colonel on 1 October 1881, retiring with the honorary rank of major-general on 31 December 1887.

The success of the scheme for national instruction in science and art was largely due to Donnelly, although some of his methods came to be reckoned reactionary. In agreement with a much controverted principle he arranged (by minute of 1859) that grants should be made to certificated teachers on the results of the examinations of their pupils. Prizes were at the same time to be awarded to successful students, whether trained in recognised schools or otherwise. He obtained due recognition for drawing and manual training as class subjects, and having induced the Society of Arts, which he joined in 1860, to form a class in wood-carving, he procured from City companies and other sources funds to carry it on as the School of Art Wood-carving, which is now located in Thurloe Place, South Kensington.

In 1874 his title at South Kensington became 'Director of Science,' and his duties included the supervision not only of the science schools and classes throughout the country but of other important scientific institutions like the Government School of Mines, the Museum of Practical Geology, the Royal College of Chemistry, the Edinburgh Museum of Science and Art, and the Museum of Irish Industry, which developed into the Royal College of Science for Ireland. In 1868, as a member of a commission appointed to consider the question, he had drafted a report adverse to the establishment of a separate department of science and art for Ireland. In 1881 he was appointed in addition assistant secretary of the science and art department, and in 1884 secretary and permanent head of the department. Joining the council of the Society of Arts in 1870, he was mainly responsible in 1871 for the society's scheme of technological examinations, out of which by his advice the City Guilds Institute for technical education was developed. As chairman of the council of the Society of Arts in 1894 and 1895, he led the society to organise the International Congress on Technical Education in 1897.

For many years the museums of science and art at Kensington had been housed in temporary and straggling makeshift galleries and sheds, and Donnelly was untiring in his efforts to secure parliamentary grants for the erection of permanent buildings. In 1896 the House of Commons appointed a select committee on whose report in 1899 a sum of 800,000l. was voted to complete the museums. In the course of the inquiry Donnelly's administration was called in question (see Report and Evidence of Committee of House of Commons on the Museums of the Science and Art Department, 1899). Whatever the defects of the educational policy pursued, the study of science grew immensely under Donnelly's direction. In 1859 the total number of science students was under 400; ten years later there were over 1400 classes comprising 25,000 students, while at the time of Donnelly's death these numbers were increased eight-fold. In accordance with the civil service rule he retired on 2 July 1899 on attaining the age of sixty-five. A minute of the privy council dated the following day animadverted on the committee's Report, stating that the sole responsibility lay on their lordships for the administration of the Science and Art Department, wluch had been loyally carried out by Colonel Donnelly and his staff, in whom they retained the fullest confidence. Sir John Gorst, vice-president of the committee of council on education, when presenting Donnelly with a testimonial from 500 of the South Kensington staff (29 November), warmly defended him from adverse criticism, and Sir John presided at a complimentary dinner given by his old colleagues (12 December).

Donnelly was made C.B. in 1886 and K.C.B. (civil) in 1893. In 1888 he was elected a member of the Athenaeum under Rule II. He was no mean artist, and from 1888 to 1901 he exhibited water-colour paintings and etchings at the Royal Academy or the New Gallery. In 1888 he took part in the formation of the committee for the preservation of the monuments of ancient Egypt. He wrote two pamphlets, on 'The Employment of Iron Shields in Siege Operations' (1868), and on 'Army Organisation' (1869) in which he advocated personal service.

He died on 5 April 1902 at his residence, 59 Onslow Gardens, London, and was buried at Brompton cemetery.

A portrait in oils by H. T. Wells, R.A. (exhibited at the Royal Academy in 1901), and a charcoal head by Sir E. J. Poynter, P.R.A., were in Lady Donnelly's possession. Donnelly was twice married : (1) at Bridekirk, Cumberland, on 5 January 1871, to his first cousin Adeliza (d. 1873), second daughter of Fretcheville Lawson Ballantine Dykes of Dovenby Hall, Cumberland; by her he had two daughters; (2) at Neuchatel, Switzerland, on 17 December 1881, to his first wife's elder sister, Mary Frances Dykes; by her he had two sons, Thomas and Gordon Harvey, both lieutenants in the royal garrison artillery, and a daughter.
