= John Trunley =

British music hall and sideshow performer (1898–1944)

John Thomas Trunley
- Born: 14 October 1898; Camberwell, London, England
- Died: 30 September 1944 (aged 45); England
- Other names: The Fat Boy of Peckham
- Occupation: Music hall performer
- Years active: 1903–1927
- Known for: Being proclaimed one of the heaviest people in Britain during his youth

John Thomas Trunley (14 October 1898 – 30 September 1944) was a British music hall and sideshow performer, widely known as The Fat Boy of Peckham.

== Early life ==
Trunley was born in Camberwell, London. He gained weight rapidly during infancy and reportedly weighed 2 stone (28 lb; 13 kg) at seven months old. By the age of four, he weighed approximately 12 stone (170 lb; 76 kg). He was examined by surgeon Sir Frederick Treves, who is also known for treating Joseph Merrick, the "Elephant Man".

== Career ==
Trunley made his music hall debut in December 1903 at the Yarmouth Hippodrome, and later performed at venues including the Royal Theatre in Holborn.

He became a popular novelty act and toured across England under showmen such as Fred Karno and Buffalo Bill Cody.

Despite his early stage success, he was later required to attend school in Peckham. Reports from the period noted that he had a chest measurement of 44 inches (1,100 mm) and a waist measurement of 46 inches (1,200 mm) during childhood.

By 1906, his fame had grown sufficiently that The Sketch published a satirical piece suggesting that London authorities might need a special tram service to transport him.

After the First World War, Trunley reportedly secured minor roles in early film productions.

== Personal life ==
Trunley married Florence Weeden (born 1899), and the couple had one child, also named John.

== Death ==
Trunley died on 30 September 1944 from pulmonary tuberculosis. He was buried at Camberwell New Cemetery.

== Bibliography ==
- Bondeson, Jan (March 2015). "The Fat Boy of Peckham". Fortean Times (325). London. ISSN 0308-5899.
