= Julius Raines =

British Army officer

General Sir Julius Raines GCB
- Born: 9 March 1825; London, England
- Died: 11 April 1909 (aged 84); London, England
- Military career
- Allegiance: United Kingdom
- Branch: British Army
- Service years: 1842–1881
- Rank: General
- Commands: 95th (Derbyshire) Regiment of Foot
- Conflicts: Crimean War; Indian Rebellion of 1857
- Awards: Knight Grand Cross of the Order of the Bath; Mentioned in Dispatches

General Sir Julius Augustus Robert Raines GCB (9 March 1825 – 11 April 1909) was a British Army officer who commanded the 95th (Derbyshire) Regiment of Foot and was later honorary colonel of the Buffs.

== Biography ==
Raines was born in London 1825, the son of Colonel Joseph Robert Raines of Cork, and Julia Jardine of Sevenoaks Kent. His father had served in the Peninsular War. He was brought up in Sevenoaks in the home of his mother Julia Jardine and attended the Ecole Militare in Brunswick, followed by the Royal Military College, Sandhurst. He commissioned into the Buffs (Royal East Kent Regiment) in 1842, but transferred to the 95th (Derbyshire) Regiment of Foot the same year. He was promoted to lieutenant in 1844 and to captain in 1852.

He served throughout the Crimean War. For his services with the Ottoman army in Silistra, prior to the invasion of the Crimea, he later received the first-class gold medal of the Liakat. Raines carried the Queen's Colour at the Battle of Alma, and also saw action at the battles of Inkerman and Tchemaya. During the siege and fall of Sevastopol he served as an assistant engineer, being severely wounded in the trenches during the bombardment of 17 October 1854, and being present in the trenches at the attack on the Redan on 18 June 1855. He received the medal with three clasps, and was mentioned in dispatches 'as having served with zeal and distinction from the opening of the campaign.' The Sardinian and Turkish war medals and fifth class Order of the Medjidie were also awarded to him. He became a brevet major on 24 April 1855, and he became a full major on 1 May 1857.

Raines commanded the 95th regiment throughout the Indian Mutiny campaign between 1857 and 1859. He was present at the assault and capture of Rowa on 6 January 1858, when he received the high commendation of the John Elphinstone, 13th Lord Elphinstone and the commander-in-chief for 'gallantry displayed and ably conducting these operations.' He led the left wing of the 95th regiment at the siege and capture of Awah on 24 January, and at the siege and capture of Kotah on 30 March was in command of the third assaulting column. At the battle of Kotah-ke-Serai he was mentioned in dispatches by Sir Hugh Rose 'for good service.' He was especially active during the capture of Gwalior on 19 June, when he was wounded by a musket ball in the left arm, after taking by assault two 18-pounders and helping to turn the captured guns on the enemy. For gallantry in minor engagements he was four times mentioned in dispatches. The 95th regiment, while under his command in Central India, marched 3000 miles. He received the medal with clasp, was promoted to lieutenant-colonel on 17 November 1857, received the brevet of colonel on 20 July 1858, and was appointed a Companion of the Order of the Bath on 21 March 1859. Raines next saw active service at Aden, where he commanded an expedition into the interior of Arabia in 1865. Raines was promoted to major-general on 6 March 1868, to lieutenant-general on 1 October 1877, and general (retired) on 1 July 1881, and was nominated colonel-in-chief of the Buffs in 1882. In 1893, he was advanced to Knight Commander of the Order of the Bath, and in 1906 was advanced to Knight Grand Cross of the Order of the Bath.
